= What Makes You Country Tour =

2018 concert tour by Luke Bryan

- Tour by Luke Bryan
- Promotional poster
- Location: North America, Australia
- Associated album: What Makes You Country
- Start date: February 16, 2018
- End date: October 26, 2018
- Legs: 3
- No. of shows: 51

Luke Bryan concert chronology
- Huntin', Fishin' and Lovin' Every Day Tour (2017); What Makes You Country Tour (2018); Sunset Repeat Tour (2019)

The What Makes You Country Tour was the sixth headlining concert tour by American country music artist Luke Bryan. In support of his sixth studio album What Makes You Country (2017), it began on February 18, 2018, in Springfield, Missouri, and concluded on October 26, 2018, in Detroit, Michigan. Stadium dates included Sam Hunt and played historic venues such as Boston's Fenway Park, Chicago's Wrigley Field, and the tour was the first country concert to be held at Los Angeles's Dodger Stadium.

== Setlist ==
This set list represents the September 8, 2018, show in Dallas, it does not represent the full-length of the tour.

1. "Country Girl (Shake It for Me)"
2. "Huntin', Fishin' and Lovin' Every Day"
3. "I Don't Want This Night to End"
4. "This Is How We Roll"
5. "All My Friends Say"
6. "Light It Up"
7. "Someone Else Calling You Baby"
8. "Most People Are Good"
9. "Kiss Tomorrow Goodbye"
10. "Sunrise, Sunburn, Sunset"
11. "What Makes You Country"
12. "Kick the Dust Up"
13. "Strip It Down"
14. "Drunk on You"
15. "Crash My Party"
16. "Home Alone Tonight" / "Do I"
17. "Girls Like You" _{(Maroon 5 cover)}
18. "Good Directions" _{(Billy Currington cover)}
19. "Dixieland Delight" _{(Alabama cover)}
20. "Drink a Beer"
21. "Roller Coaster"
22. "Play It Again"
23. "Rain Is a Good Thing"
24. "Move"
25. "That's My Kind of Night"

== Tour dates ==
Date	City	Country	Venue	Opening act(s)
North America leg 1
February 16, 2018	Springfield	United States	JQH Arena	Kip Moore; The Cadillac Three
February 17, 2018	Evansville	United States	Ford Center	Kip Moore; The Cadillac Three
February 18, 2018	Louisville	United States	KFC Yum! Center	Kip Moore; The Cadillac Three
February 22, 2018	State College	United States	Bryce Jordan Center	Kip Moore; The Cadillac Three
February 23, 2018	Atlantic City	United States	Boardwalk Hall	Kip Moore; The Cadillac Three
February 24, 2018	Charlottesville	United States	John Paul Jones Arena	Kip Moore; The Cadillac Three
March 9, 2018	Lafayette	United States	Cajundome	Brothers Osborne; Granger Smith Feat. Earl Dibbles Jr.
March 10, 2018	New Orleans	United States	Smoothie King Center	Brothers Osborne; Granger Smith Feat. Earl Dibbles Jr.
Australia
March 16, 2018	Sydney	Australia	Qudos Bank Arena	Dustin Lynch
March 20, 2018	Melbourne	Australia	Rod Laver Arena	Dustin Lynch
North America leg 2
March 23, 2018	Honolulu	United States	Neal S. Blaisdell Center	Brothers Osborne
March 24, 2018	Honolulu	United States	Neal S. Blaisdell Center	Brothers Osborne
April 6, 2018	Albuquerque	United States	Isleta Amphitheater	Granger Smith Feat. Earl Dibbles Jr.
April 7, 2018	Laughlin	United States	Laughlin Event Center	—
May 31, 2018	Toronto	Canada	Rogers Centre	Sam Hunt; Jon Pardi; Morgan Wallen; DJ Rock
June 2, 2018	East Rutherford	United States	MetLife Stadium	Sam Hunt; Jon Pardi; Morgan Wallen; DJ Rock
June 14, 2018	Columbia	United States	Merriweather Post Pavilion	Jon Pardi; Morgan Wallen
June 15, 2018	North Lawrence	United States	Clay's Park CountryFest	Jon Pardi; Morgan Wallen
June 16, 2018	Cincinnati	United States	Great American Ball Park	Sam Hunt; Jon Pardi; Morgan Wallen; DJ Rock
June 21, 2018	West Palm Beach	United States	Coral Sky Amphitheatre	Jon Pardi; Morgan Wallen
June 22, 2018	Jacksonville	United States	Jacksonville Veterans Memorial Arena	Jon Pardi; Morgan Wallen
June 23, 2018	Tampa	United States	Raymond James Stadium	Sam Hunt; Jon Pardi; Morgan Wallen; DJ Rock
June 28, 2018	Raleigh	United States	Coastal Credit Union Music Park	Jon Pardi; Morgan Wallen
June 29, 2018	Charlotte	United States	PNC Music Pavilion	Jon Pardi; Morgan Wallen
June 30, 2018	Pittsburgh	United States	Heinz Field	Sam Hunt; Jon Pardi; Morgan Wallen; DJ Rock
July 6, 2018	Boston	United States	Fenway Park	—
July 14, 2018	Calgary	Canada	Scotiabank Saddledome	Tim Hicks
July 20, 2018	Monticello	United States	Great Jones County Fair	Morgan Wallen
July 21, 2018	Minneapolis	United States	Target Field	Sam Hunt; Jon Pardi; Morgan Wallen; DJ Rock
July 25, 2018	Stateline	United States	Lake Tahoe Outdoor Arena	Morgan Wallen
July 28, 2018	Los Angeles	United States	Dodger Stadium	Sam Hunt; Jon Pardi; Morgan Wallen; DJ Rock
August 1, 2018	Rogers	United States	Walmart Arkansas Music Pavilion	Jon Pardi; Morgan Wallen
August 2, 2018	Omaha	United States	CenturyLink Center	Jon Pardi; Morgan Wallen
August 4, 2018	Denver	United States	Sports Authority Field at Mile High	Sam Hunt; Jon Pardi; Morgan Wallen; DJ Rock
August 17, 2018	Syracuse	United States	Lakeview Amphitheater	Jon Pardi; Morgan Wallen
August 18, 2018	Bristow	United States	Jiffy Lube Live	Jon Pardi; Morgan Wallen
August 19, 2018	Saratoga Springs	United States	Saratoga Performing Arts Center	Jon Pardi; Morgan Wallen
August 24, 2018	Noblesville	United States	Ruoff Home Mortgage Music Center	Jon Pardi; Morgan Wallen
August 25, 2018	St. Louis	United States	Busch Stadium	Sam Hunt; Jon Pardi; Morgan Wallen; DJ Rock
August 26, 2018	Kansas City	United States	Sprint Center	Jon Pardi; Morgan Wallen
September 1, 2018	Chicago	United States	Wrigley Field	Sam Hunt; Jon Pardi; Carly Pearce; DJ Rock
September 6, 2018	San Antonio	United States	AT&T Center	Jon Pardi; Carly Pearce
September 7, 2018	The Woodlands	United States	Cynthia Woods Mitchell Pavilion	Jon Pardi; Carly Pearce
September 8, 2018	Dallas	United States	Dos Equis Pavilion	Jon Pardi; Carly Pearce
September 13, 2018	Rapid City	United States	Rushmore Plaza Civic Center	Jon Pardi; Carly Pearce
September 14, 2018	Billings	United States	Rimrock Auto Arena at MetraPark	Jon Pardi; Carly Pearce
September 19, 2018	Missoula	United States	Big Sky Brewing Company	Jon Pardi; Carly Pearce
September 20, 2018	Nampa	United States	Ford Idaho Center	Jon Pardi; Carly Pearce
September 21, 2018	West Valley City	United States	USANA Amphitheatre	Jon Pardi; Carly Pearce
October 11, 2018	Portland	United States	Moda Center	Jon Pardi; Carly Pearce
October 12, 2018	Auburn	United States	White River Amphitheatre	Jon Pardi; Carly Pearce
October 13, 2018	Vancouver	Canada	BC Place	Sam Hunt; Jon Pardi; Carly Pearce; DJ Rock
October 25, 2018	Rochester	United States	Blue Cross Arena	Jon Pardi; Carly Pearce
October 26, 2018	Detroit	United States	Ford Field	Sam Hunt; Jon Pardi; Carly Pearce; DJ Rock

=== Box office score data ===
Venue	City	Attendance	Gross
Scotiabank Saddledome	Calgary	11,398 / 11,398 (100%)	$1,597,190
Great Jones County Fair	Monticello	11,475 / 12,057 (95%)	$952,425
Target Field	Minneapolis	36,078 / 36,385 (99%)	$2,921,581
Lake Tahoe Outdoor Arena	Stateline	6,748 / 6,748 (100%)	$773,401
Dodgers Stadium	Los Angeles	44,939 / 44,939 (100%)	$3,654,968
CenturyLink Center	Omaha	11,513 / 15,114 (76%)	$802,373
Sports Authority Field	Denver	51,756 / 60,328 (86%)	$3,759,849
Lakeview Amphitheater	Syracuse	18,763 / 19,142 (98%)	$1,081,957
Jiffy Lube Live	Bristow	21,738 / 22,637 (96%)	$1,083,893
Saratoga Performing Arts Center	Saratoga Springs	17,377 / 25,060 (69%)	$912,575
Ruoff Home Mortgage Music Center	Noblesville	24,425 / 24,425 (100%)	$1,170,997
Busch Stadium	St. Louis	36,255 / 38,051 (95%)	$2,235,151
Sprint Center	Kansas City	10,894 / 11,876 (92%)	$771,056
Wrigley Field	Chicago	40,013 / 40,013 (100%)	$3,217,012
AT&T Center	San Antonio	11,384 / 12,494 (91%)	$799,776
Dos Equis Pavilion	Dallas	17,446 / 20,000 (87%)	$884,426
Rimrock Auto Arena	Billings	7,723 / 7,723 (100%)	$709,405
USANA Amphitheatre	Salt Lake City	18,859 / 19,500 (97%)	$926,577
Total		398,784 / 427,890 (93%)	$28,254,612

== Personnel ==
- Michael Carter – band leader, electric guitar
- Jason Faussett – acoustic guitar, piano
- James Cook – bass guitar
- Kent Slucher – drums
- Kevin Arrowsmith – fiddle, electric guitar
- Dave Ristrum – banjo
