= Huntin', Fishin' and Lovin' Every Day Tour =

2017 concert tour by Luke Bryan

- Tour by Luke Bryan
- Promotional poster
- Location: North America
- Start date: May 5, 2017
- End date: October 27, 2017
- Legs: 1
- No. of shows: 46
- Box office: $9,224,066

Luke Bryan concert chronology
- Kill the Lights Tour (2016–17); Huntin', Fishin' and Lovin' Every Day Tour (2017); What Makes You Country Tour (2018)

The Huntin', Fishin' and Lovin' Every Day Tour was the fifth headlining concert tour by American country music artist Luke Bryan. It began on May 5, 2017, in Nashville Tennessee, and concluded on October 28, 2017, in San Bernardino, California.

== Background ==
Bryan announced tour in January 2017, by posting a video of him playing Duck Hunt. He sits down on his couch wearing camouflage and says "let's hunt us up some opening acts." Whenever he would shoot at a duck, he would call out a potential opening act. For the ducks he would hit, it would show the face of the opening act who will be going on tour with him. In pixel, the end shot of the video shows the tour name and pictures of Bryan and his opening acts.

== Show ==
Bryan opens the show with "Move" and past hits, "That's My Kind of Night" and "Kick the Dust Up". When it comes time for "Fast", the audience is treated to photos of Bryan's family that are shown on screen. Some of them are from Bryan's wedding to his wife Caroline. Bryan begins and ends "Fast" with just himself and his guitar. At one point of the show Bryan and his band moves to b-stage for the intimate portion of the concert. There he begins to play the piano. At the b-stage Bryan cover's Alabama's "Mountain Music" and Neil Diamond's "Sweet Caroline", then follows up with his slowed down hit "Strip It Down". In Nashville, Little Big Town's Kimberly Fairchild made a special appearance to perform her and Bryan's single, "Home Alone Tonight". Afterwards they sung Little Big Town's hit single "Girl Crush" together. Bryan ends the night with "I Don't Want This Night" and "Country Girl (Shake It for Me)".

== Opening acts ==
- Lauren Alaina
- Craig Campbell
- Adam Craig
- Brett Eldredge
- Seth Ennis
- Granger Smith

== Setlist ==
The setlist at the opening Nashville show:

1. "Move"
2. "That's My Kind of Night"
3. "Kick the Dust Up"
4. "Rain Is a Good Thing"
5. "Fast"
6. "Crash My Party"
7. "Kiss Tomorrow Goodbye"
8. "I See You"
9. "Roller Coaster"
10. "All My Friends Say"
11. "Mountain Music" (Alabama cover)
12. "Caroline" (Barry Manilow cover)
13. "Strip It Down"
14. "Drink a Beer"
15. "Home Alone Tonight"
16. "Girl Crush" (Little Big Town cover, performed only in Nashville, and with Little Big Town's Karen Fairchild)
17. "Huntin', Fishin' and Lovin' Every Day"
18. "I Don't Want This Night to End"
19. "Country Girl (Shake It for Me)"

== Tour dates ==
Date	City	Country	Venue	Attendance	Revenue
North America leg 1
May 5, 2017	Nashville	United States	Bridgestone Arena	30,272 / 30,272	$1,623,862
May 6, 2017	Nashville	United States	Bridgestone Arena	30,272 / 30,272	$1,623,862
May 12, 2017	Bristow	United States	Jiffy Lube Live	20,630 / 22,565	$923,630
May 13, 2017	Hartford	United States	Xfinity Theatre	23,589 / 24,421	$986,321
May 18, 2017	Moline	United States	iWireless Center	16,525 / 20,416	$1,131,644
May 19, 2017	Moline	United States	iWireless Center	16,525 / 20,416	$1,131,644
June 1, 2017	Cincinnati	United States	Riverbend Music Center	20,337 / 20,337	$810,336
June 3, 2017	Maryland Heights	United States	Hollywood Casino Amphitheatre	18,602 / 18,602	$843,501
June 9, 2017	North Little Rock	United States	Verizon Arena	9,157 /10,567	$573,018
June 10, 2017	Tulsa	United States	BOK Center	8,772 / 11,502	$615,891
June 15, 2017	Alpharetta	United States	Verizon Wireless Amphitheatre	33,493 / 36,492	$1,715,863
June 16, 2017	Alpharetta	United States	Verizon Wireless Amphitheatre	33,493 / 36,492	$1,715,863
June 17, 2017	Alpharetta	United States	Verizon Wireless Amphitheatre	33,493 / 36,492	$1,715,863
June 23, 2017	Hershey	United States	Hersheypark Stadium	—	—
June 24, 2017	Mansfield	United States	Xfinity Center	—	—
June 25, 2017	Columbia	United States	Merriweather Post Pavilion	—	—
July 13, 2017	Bethel	United States	Bethel Woods Center for the Arts	—	—
July 15, 2017	Cleveland	United States	Progressive Field	—	—
July 16, 2017	Holmdel	United States	PNC Bank Arts Center	—	—
July 21, 2017	Kansas City	United States	Sprint Center	—	—
August 1, 2017	Anchorage	United States	Sullivan Sports Arena	—	—
August 2, 2017	Anchorage	United States	Sullivan Sports Arena	—	—
August 12, 2017	Syracuse	United States	Lakeview Amphitheater	—	—
August 17, 2017	Virginia Beach	United States	Veterans United Home Loans Amphitheater	—	—
August 18, 2017	Charlotte	United States	PNC Music Pavilion	—	—
August 19, 2017	Raleigh	United States	Coastal Credit Union Music Park	—	—
August 24, 2017	Canandaigua	United States	CMAC	—	—
August 25, 2017	Darien	United States	Darien Lake Performing Arts Center	—	—
August 26, 2017	Saratoga Springs	United States	Saratoga Performing Arts Center	—	—
August 27, 2017	Wantagh	United States	Northwell Health at Jones Beach Theater	—	—
September 6, 2017	Scranton	United States	The Pavilion	—	—
September 8, 2017	Philadelphia	United States	Citizens Bank Park	—	—
September 9, 2017	Burgettstown	United States	KeyBank Pavilion	—	—
September 15, 2017	Noblesville	United States	Klipsch Music Center	—	—
September 16, 2017	Tinley Park	United States	Hollywood Casino Amphitheatre	—	—
September 21, 2017	Austin	United States	Austin360 Amphitheater	—	—
September 22, 2017	The Woodlands	United States	Cynthia Woods Mitchell Pavilion	—	—
September 23, 2017	Dallas	United States	Starplex Pavilion	—	—
October 12, 2017	Concord	United States	Concord Pavilion	—	—
October 13, 2017	Wheatland	United States	Toyota Amphitheatre	—	—
October 14, 2017	Mountain View	United States	Shoreline Amphitheatre	—	—
October 19, 2017	Albuquerque	United States	Isleta Amphitheater	—	—
October 21, 2017	West Valley City	United States	USANA Amphitheatre	—	—
October 26, 2017	Phoenix	United States	Ak-Chin Pavilion	—	—
October 27, 2017	Chula Vista	United States	Mattress Firm Amphitheatre	—	—
October 28, 2017	San Bernardino	United States	San Manuel Amphitheater	—	–
Total				181,377 / 195,174	$9,224,066
