= List of number-one country singles of 2016 (Canada) =

Canada Country was a chart published weekly by Billboard magazine.

This 50-position chart lists the most popular country music songs, calculated weekly by airplay on 31 country music stations across the country as monitored by Nielsen BDS. Songs are ranked by total plays. As with most other Billboard charts, the Canada Country chart features a rule for when a song enters recurrent rotation. A song is declared recurrent if it has been on the chart longer than 30 weeks and is lower than number 20 in rank.

These are the Canadian number-one country singles of 2016, per the BDS Canada Country Airplay chart.

Note that Billboard publishes charts with an issue date approximately 7–10 days in advance.

Key
†	Indicates best charting country single of 2016.

Issue date	Country Song	Artist	Ref.
January 2	"Die a Happy Man"	Thomas Rhett	
January 9	"Die a Happy Man"	Thomas Rhett	
January 16	"Die a Happy Man"	Thomas Rhett	
January 23	"Die a Happy Man"	Thomas Rhett	
January 30	"Die a Happy Man"	Thomas Rhett	
February 6	"Home Alone Tonight"	Luke Bryan featuring Karen Fairchild	
February 13	"Home Alone Tonight"	Luke Bryan featuring Karen Fairchild	
February 20	"Break on Me"	Keith Urban	
February 27	"Break on Me"	Keith Urban	
March 5	"Break on Me"	Keith Urban	
March 12	"Heartbeat"	Carrie Underwood	
March 19	"Heartbeat"	Carrie Underwood	
March 26	"Heartbeat"	Carrie Underwood	
April 2	"Drunk on Your Love"	Brett Eldredge	
April 9	"Confession"	Florida Georgia Line	
April 16	"Drunk on Your Love"	Brett Eldredge	
April 23	"Snapback"	Old Dominion	
April 30	"Think of You"	Chris Young featuring Cassadee Pope	
May 7	"Think of You"	Chris Young featuring Cassadee Pope	
May 14	"Somewhere on a Beach"	Dierks Bentley	
May 21	"Somewhere on a Beach"	Dierks Bentley	
May 28	"Humble and Kind"	Tim McGraw	
June 4	"T-Shirt"	Thomas Rhett	
June 11	"Huntin', Fishin' and Lovin' Every Day"	Luke Bryan	
June 18	"Huntin', Fishin' and Lovin' Every Day"	Luke Bryan	
June 25	"Wasted Time"	Keith Urban	
July 2	"Came Here to Forget"	Blake Shelton	
July 9	"H.O.L.Y."	Florida Georgia Line	
July 16	"H.O.L.Y."	Florida Georgia Line	
July 23	"H.O.L.Y."	Florida Georgia Line	
July 30	"H.O.L.Y."	Florida Georgia Line	
August 6	"Record Year" †	Eric Church	
August 13	"Record Year" †	Eric Church	
August 20	"Record Year" †	Eric Church	
August 27	"Different for Girls"	Dierks Bentley featuring Elle King	
September 3	"Different for Girls"	Dierks Bentley featuring Elle King	
September 10	"Different for Girls"	Dierks Bentley featuring Elle King	
September 17	"Different for Girls"	Dierks Bentley featuring Elle King	
September 24	"Different for Girls"	Dierks Bentley featuring Elle King	
October 1	"Different for Girls"	Dierks Bentley featuring Elle King	
October 8	"You Look Like I Need a Drink"	Justin Moore	
October 15	"Setting the World on Fire"	Kenny Chesney featuring Pink	
October 22	"Setting the World on Fire"	Kenny Chesney featuring Pink	
October 29	"It Don't Hurt Like It Used To"	Billy Currington	
November 5	"Move"	Luke Bryan	
November 12	"Move"	Luke Bryan	
November 19	"May We All"	Florida Georgia Line featuring Tim McGraw	
November 26	"Autograph"	Dallas Smith	
December 3	"May We All"	Florida Georgia Line featuring Tim McGraw	
December 10	"Blue Ain't Your Color"	Keith Urban	
December 17	"Blue Ain't Your Color"	Keith Urban	
December 24	"Blue Ain't Your Color"	Keith Urban	
December 31	"Dirty Laundry"	Carrie Underwood	

== See also ==
- 2016 in music
- List of number-one country singles of 2016 (U.S.)
