= List of Billboard number-one country songs of 2016 =

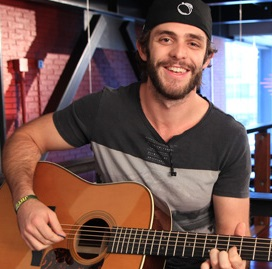
Thomas Rhett topped both charts throughout the month of January.

Hot Country Songs and Country Airplay are charts that rank the top-performing country music songs in the United States, published by Billboard magazine. Hot Country Songs ranks songs based on digital downloads, streaming, and airplay not only from country stations but from stations of all formats, a methodology introduced in 2012. Country Airplay, which was published for the first time in 2012, is based solely on country radio airplay, a methodology which had previously been used for several decades for Hot Country Songs. In 2016, nine different songs topped the Hot Country Songs chart and 40 different songs topped Country Airplay in 52 issues of the magazine.

In the first issue of Billboard of the new year, Thomas Rhett was at number one on both charts with "Die a Happy Man". On Hot Country Songs, the song would continue to hold the top spot through the issue of Billboard dated March 19, finishing with a total of 17 weeks at number one. The song spent six consecutive weeks atop Country Airplay, twice as long as any other song in 2016. Additionally, it was the longest run at number one on Billboard's airplay-based country chart since 2008. The longest run at number one on the Hot Country Songs during the year was 18 weeks, achieved by the song "H.O.L.Y." by Florida Georgia Line. This figure was also the highest total number of weeks spent in the top spot by any act, as no act achieved more than one chart-topper during the year. On the airplay listing, ten acts reached the top spot with more than one song; Luke Bryan and Florida Georgia Line each achieved three number ones during the year. Rhett's total of seven weeks at number one was the highest for any act.

In the issue of Billboard dated October 8, the song "Forever Country", credited to Artists of Then, Now and Forever, achieved the rare feat of entering the chart at number one. The song, a one-off collaboration between 30 country stars from various eras released to mark the 50th Annual Country Music Association Awards, was only the third track to enter at the top spot in the history of the Hot Country Songs listing. A number of acts achieved their first number ones in 2016. Pop/rock singer P!nk gained a number one with her first song to appear on the country charts when she was featured on Kenny Chesney's song "Setting the World on Fire", which topped both charts. Six other acts gained their first number ones on the Country Airplay chart, beginning with Granger Smith, who topped the chart in February with "Backroad Song". Two female vocalists gained their first country number ones as featured vocalists on songs by more established male stars: Cassadee Pope with Chris Young on "Think of You", and Elle King with Dierks Bentley on "Different for Girls". The other first-time chart-toppers were Chris Lane with "Fix", Jon Pardi with "Head Over Boots", and the duo LoCash with "I Know Somebody". Additionally, Karen Fairchild made her first appearance at number one under her own name when she was featured on Luke Bryan's song "Home Alone Tonight", although she had previously reached the top spot as a member of the group Little Big Town. At the end of the year, Keith Urban's "Blue Ain't Your Color" was at number one on Hot Country Songs, and Brett Eldredge topped Country Airplay with "Wanna Be That Song".

== Chart history ==
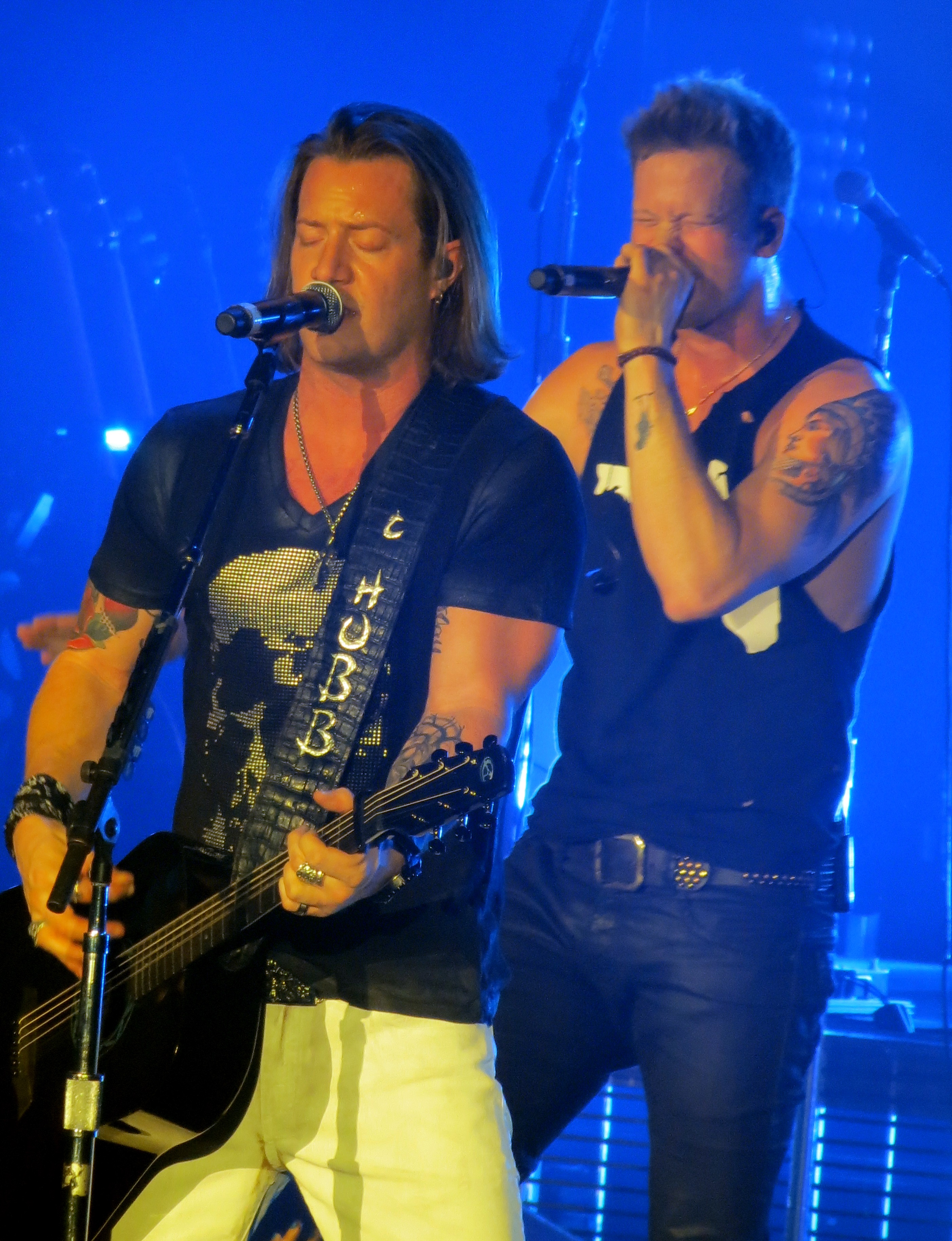
"H.O.L.Y." by Florida Georgia Line spent 18 consecutive weeks at number one on Hot Country Songs.

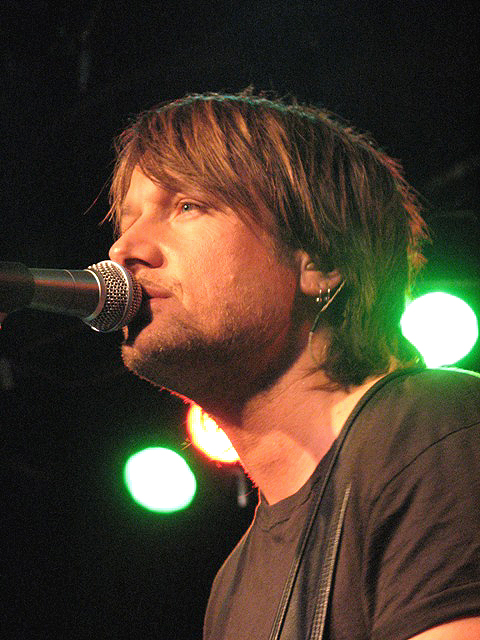
Keith Urban ended the year at number one on Hot Country Songs.

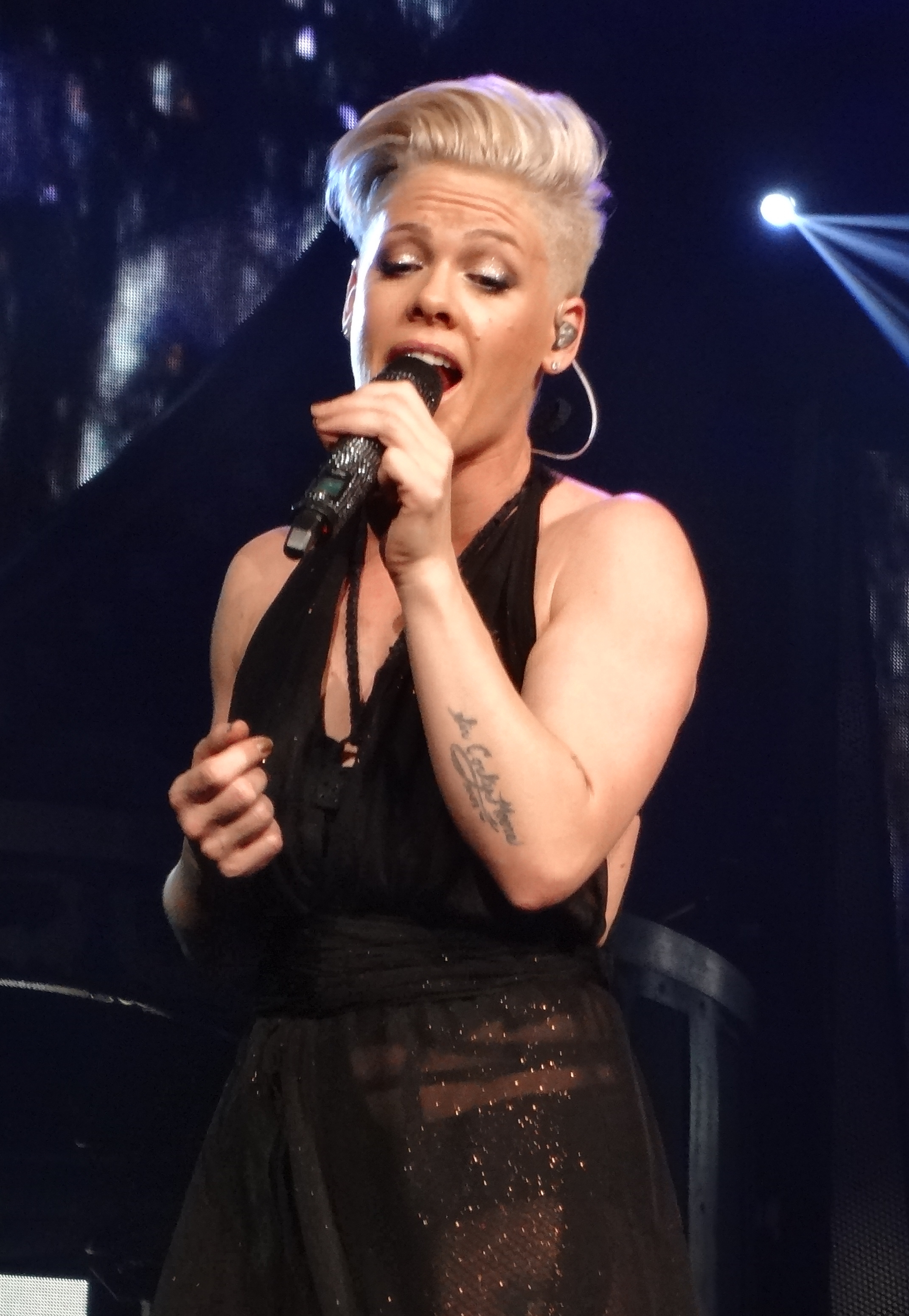
Pop/rock singer P!nk collaborated with Kenny Chesney on the chart-topper "Setting the World on Fire".

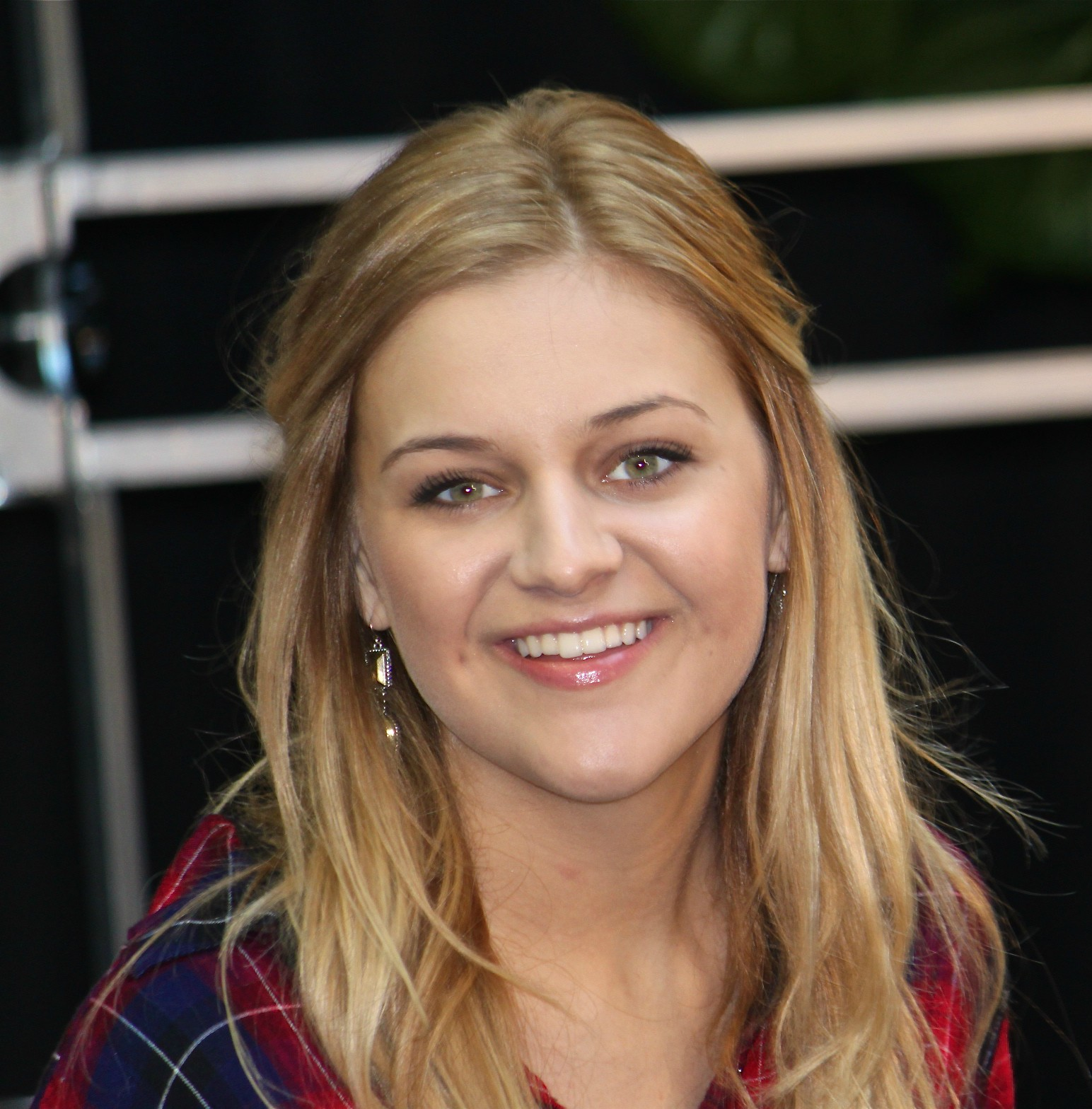
Kelsea Ballerini had two number ones on the Country Airplay chart in 2016.

Chart history
Issue date	Hot Country Songs			Country Airplay		
Issue date	Title	Artist(s)	Ref.	Title	Artist(s)	Ref.
January 2	"Die a Happy Man"	Thomas Rhett		"Die a Happy Man"	Thomas Rhett	
January 9	"Die a Happy Man"	Thomas Rhett		"Die a Happy Man"	Thomas Rhett	
January 16	"Die a Happy Man"	Thomas Rhett		"Die a Happy Man"	Thomas Rhett	
January 23	"Die a Happy Man"	Thomas Rhett		"Die a Happy Man"	Thomas Rhett	
January 30	"Die a Happy Man"	Thomas Rhett		"Die a Happy Man"	Thomas Rhett	
February 6	"Die a Happy Man"	Thomas Rhett		"Die a Happy Man"	Thomas Rhett	
February 13	"Die a Happy Man"	Thomas Rhett		"Home Alone Tonight"	Luke Bryan featuring Karen Fairchild	
February 20	"Die a Happy Man"	Thomas Rhett		"Home Alone Tonight"	Luke Bryan featuring Karen Fairchild	
February 27	"Die a Happy Man"	Thomas Rhett		"Backroad Song"	Granger Smith	
March 5	"Die a Happy Man"	Thomas Rhett		"Dibs"	Kelsea Ballerini	
March 12	"Die a Happy Man"	Thomas Rhett		"Break on Me"	Keith Urban	
March 19	"Die a Happy Man"	Thomas Rhett		"We Went"	Randy Houser	
March 26	"You Should Be Here"	Cole Swindell		"Heartbeat"	Carrie Underwood	
April 2	"You Should Be Here"	Cole Swindell		"Beautiful Drug"	Zac Brown Band	
April 9	"You Should Be Here"	Cole Swindell		"You Should Be Here"	Cole Swindell	
April 16	"You Should Be Here"	Cole Swindell		"You Should Be Here"	Cole Swindell	
April 23	"Humble and Kind"	Tim McGraw		"You Should Be Here"	Cole Swindell	
April 30	"Somewhere on a Beach"	Dierks Bentley		"I Like the Sound of That"	Rascal Flatts	
May 7	"Somewhere on a Beach"	Dierks Bentley		"Confession"	Florida Georgia Line	
May 14	"Somewhere on a Beach"	Dierks Bentley		"Think of You"	Chris Young duet with Cassadee Pope	
May 21	"H.O.L.Y."	Florida Georgia Line		"Somewhere on a Beach"	Dierks Bentley	
May 28	"H.O.L.Y."	Florida Georgia Line		"Somewhere on a Beach"	Dierks Bentley	
June 4	"H.O.L.Y."	Florida Georgia Line		"Mind Reader"	Dustin Lynch	
June 11	"H.O.L.Y."	Florida Georgia Line		"Came Here to Forget"	Blake Shelton	
June 18	"H.O.L.Y."	Florida Georgia Line		"T-Shirt"	Thomas Rhett	
June 25	"H.O.L.Y."	Florida Georgia Line		"Humble and Kind"	Tim McGraw	
July 2	"H.O.L.Y."	Florida Georgia Line		"Huntin', Fishin' and Lovin' Every Day"	Luke Bryan	
July 9	"H.O.L.Y."	Florida Georgia Line		"Wasted Time"	Keith Urban	
July 16	"H.O.L.Y."	Florida Georgia Line		"Wasted Time"	Keith Urban	
July 23	"H.O.L.Y."	Florida Georgia Line		"Lights Come On"	Jason Aldean	
July 30	"H.O.L.Y."	Florida Georgia Line		"Church Bells"	Carrie Underwood	
August 6	"H.O.L.Y."	Florida Georgia Line		"H.O.L.Y."	Florida Georgia Line	
August 13	"H.O.L.Y."	Florida Georgia Line		"Record Year"	Eric Church	
August 20	"H.O.L.Y."	Florida Georgia Line		"Fix"	Chris Lane	
August 27	"H.O.L.Y."	Florida Georgia Line		"Head Over Boots"	Jon Pardi	
September 3	"H.O.L.Y."	Florida Georgia Line		"From the Ground Up"	Dan + Shay	
September 10	"H.O.L.Y."	Florida Georgia Line		"Make You Miss Me"	Sam Hunt	
September 17	"H.O.L.Y."	Florida Georgia Line		"American Country Love Song"	Jake Owen	
September 24	"Peter Pan"	Kelsea Ballerini		"Peter Pan"	Kelsea Ballerini	
October 1	"Peter Pan"	Kelsea Ballerini		"Different for Girls"	Dierks Bentley featuring Elle King	
October 8	"Forever Country"	Artists of Then, Now & Forever		"You Look Like I Need a Drink"	Justin Moore	
October 15	"Forever Country"	Artists of Then, Now & Forever		"It Don't Hurt Like It Used To"	Billy Currington	
October 22	"Setting the World on Fire"	Kenny Chesney featuring P!nk		"It Don't Hurt Like It Used To"	Billy Currington	
October 29	"Setting the World on Fire"	Kenny Chesney featuring P!nk		"I Know Somebody"	LoCash	
November 5	"Setting the World on Fire"	Kenny Chesney featuring P!nk		"Setting the World on Fire"	Kenny Chesney featuring P!nk	
November 12	"Setting the World on Fire"	Kenny Chesney featuring P!nk		"Move"	Luke Bryan	
November 19	"Blue Ain't Your Color"	Keith Urban		"Move"	Luke Bryan	
November 26	"Blue Ain't Your Color"	Keith Urban		"Middle of a Memory"	Cole Swindell	
December 3	"Blue Ain't Your Color"	Keith Urban		"A Little More Summertime"	Jason Aldean	
December 10	"Blue Ain't Your Color"	Keith Urban		"May We All"	Florida Georgia Line featuring Tim McGraw	
December 17	"Blue Ain't Your Color"	Keith Urban		"May We All"	Florida Georgia Line featuring Tim McGraw	
December 24	"Blue Ain't Your Color"	Keith Urban		"Song for Another Time"	Old Dominion	
December 31	"Blue Ain't Your Color"	Keith Urban		"Wanna Be That Song"	Brett Eldredge	

== See also ==
- 2016 in music
- List of artists who reached number one on the U.S. country chart
- List of number-one country albums of 2016 (U.S.)
- List of number-one country singles of 2016 (Canada)
