= Tailgates & Tanlines =

Studio album by Luke Bryan
- Released: August 9, 2011
- Studios: Blackbird Studio, Starstruck Studios, House of Blues and The Mix Mill (Nashville, Tennessee)
- Genre: Country
- Length: 47:43
- Label: Capitol Records Nashville
- Producers: Jeff Stevens (all tracks); Mark Bright (track 1)

Luke Bryan chronology
Doin' My Thing (2009)	Tailgates & Tanlines (2011)	Crash My Party (2013)

Singles from Tailgates & Tanlines
- 1. "Country Girl (Shake It for Me)" Released: March 14, 2011; 2. "I Don't Want This Night to End" Released: September 5, 2011; 3. "Drunk on You" Released: February 13, 2012; 4. "Kiss Tomorrow Goodbye" Released: August 6, 2012

Professional ratings
Review scores
Source	Rating
AllMusic	link
Slant Magazine	link

Tailgates & Tanlines is the third studio album by American country music artist Luke Bryan. It was released on August 9, 2011 by Capitol Records Nashville. Bryan co-wrote eight of the album's thirteen tracks, including its first single, "Country Girl (Shake It for Me)." American Songwriter called Tailgates & Tanlines "a soundtrack for fun and sun, along with an instantaneous cure for the summertime blues." The song "Too Damn Young" was originally recorded by Julie Roberts on her 2006 album Men & Mascara.

== Commercial performance ==
Tailgates & Tanlines debuted at number two on the US Billboard 200 chart and number one on the Top Country Albums chart, selling 145,295 copies in its first week. It was Luke Bryan's best-selling album until it was surpassed by Crash My Party in April 2015. As of April 2017, the album has sold 2,570,700 copies in the US. On September 5, 2017, the album was certified quadruple platinum by the Recording Industry Association of America (RIAA) for selling over four million copies in the United States.

In Canada, the album debuted at number six on the Canadian Albums Chart. The album was certified by Music Canada for sales of over 80,000 copies in Canada.

== Track listing ==
No.	Title	Writer(s)	Length
1.	"Country Girl (Shake It for Me)"	Luke Bryan; Dallas Davidson	3:45
2.	"Kiss Tomorrow Goodbye"	Bryan; Jeff Stevens; Shane McAnally	3:23
3.	"Drunk on You"	Rodney Clawson; Chris Tompkins; Josh Kear	3:33
4.	"Too Damn Young"	Arlis Albritton; Casey Koesel	3:36
5.	"I Don't Want This Night to End"	Bryan; Davidson; Rhett Akins; Ben Hayslip	3:40
6.	"You Don't Know Jack"	McAnally; Erin Enderlin	3:16
7.	"Harvest Time"	Bryan; Clawson	3:27
8.	"I Know You're Gonna Be There"	Bryan; Ashley Gorley	3:36
9.	"Muckalee Creek Water"	Bryan; Patrick Jason Matthews	3:56
10.	"Tailgate Blues" (featuring Ashton Shepherd on backing vocals)	Brent Cobb; Neil Medley	3:43
11.	"Been There, Done That"	Bryan; Rachel Thibodeau	4:29
12.	"Faded Away"	Bryan; Michael Carter	3:48
13.	"I Knew You That Way"	Jay Clementi; Radney Foster	3:32

== Personnel ==
- Luke Bryan – lead vocals
- Mark Bright – keyboards
- Mike Rojas – acoustic piano, organ
- J. T. Corenflos – electric guitar
- Kenny Greenberg – electric guitar
- Jeff King – electric guitar
- Brent Mason – electric guitar
- Adam Shoenfeld – electric guitar
- Ilya Toshinsky – acoustic guitar, banjo, mandolin
- John Willis – acoustic guitar
- Rob Ickes – dobro
- Paul Franklin – pedal steel guitar
- Steve Hinson – pedal steel guitar
- Mike Brignardello – bass
- Jimmie Lee Sloas – bass
- Greg Morrow – drums
- Eric Darken – percussion
- Joe Spivey – fiddle, mandolin
- Clare Dunn – backing vocals
- Georgia Middleman – backing vocals
- Ashton Shepherd – backing vocals (10)
- Russell Terrell – backing vocals
- Rachel Thibodeau – backing vocals

=== Production ===
- Mark Bright – co-producer (1)
- Jeff Stevens – co-producer (1), producer (2-13)
- Mills Logan – recording
- Derek Bason – mixing, additional recording
- Jody Stevens – additional recording
- Chris Ashburn – recording assistant, mix assistant
- Tom Frietag – recording assistant
- Mike Rooney – recording assistant
- Brien Sager – recording assistant
- Ted Wheeler– recording assistant
- Jed Hackett – digital editing
- Adam Ayan – mastering at Gateway Mastering (Portland, Maine) (1)
- Hank Williams – mastering at MasterMix (Nashville, Tennessee) (2-13)
- Mike "Frog" Griffith – production assistant
- Scott Johnson – production assistant
- Joanna Carter – art direction
- Wendy Stamberger – package design
- Kristin Barlowe – photography
- Michelle Hall – art production
- Lee Moore – wardrobe
- Debra Williams – grooming

== Charts ==
=== Weekly charts ===
Chart (2011–14)	Peak position
Australian Country Albums (ARIA)	23
Canadian Albums (Billboard)	6
UK Country Albums (Official Charts)	7
US Billboard 200	2
US Top Country Albums (Billboard)	1
Chart (2018)	Peak position
Australian Albums (ARIA)	64

=== Year-end charts ===
Chart (2011)	Position
US Billboard 200	61
US Top Country Albums (Billboard)	14
Chart (2012)	Position
US Billboard 200	6
US Top Country Albums (Billboard)	2
Chart (2013)	Position
US Billboard 200	33
US Top Country Albums (Billboard)	8
Chart (2014)	Position
US Billboard 200	112
US Top Catalog Albums (Billboard)	7
Chart (2015)	Position
US Billboard 200	162
Chart (2017)	Position
US Top Country Albums (Billboard)	61

=== Decade-end charts ===
Chart (2010–2019)	Position
US Billboard 200	49
US Top Country Albums (Billboard)	7

=== Singles ===
Year	Single	Peak chart positions			
Year	Single	US Hot Country	US Country Airplay	US	CAN
2011	"Country Girl (Shake It for Me)"	4	—	22	50
2011	"I Don't Want This Night to End"	1	—	22	48
2012	"Drunk on You"	1	—	16	28
2012	"Kiss Tomorrow Goodbye"	3	1	29	46
"—" denotes releases that did not chart

== Certifications ==
Region	Certification	Certified units/sales
Canada (Music Canada)	Platinum	80,000^{^}
United States (RIAA)	5× Platinum	5,000,000^{‡}
^{^} Shipments figures based on certification alone.^{‡} Sales+streaming figures based on certification alone.
