= Farm Tour =

Annual concert series by Luke Bryan

- Tour by Luke Bryan
- Associated album: Varies
- Start date: September 28, 2010

Farm Tour is a concert series put on by Luke Bryan at the beginning of October every year. Bryan came up with the concept as a way of giving back to the local farming communities, with the proceeds from the concerts going to charities and creating scholarships for students from farming families to attend local community colleges.

Preceding the 2016 Farm Tour, the extended play Farm Tour... Here's to the Farmer was released by Bryan.

== Tour dates ==
Date	City	Country	Venue	Opening Acts
2010
September 28, 2010	Valdosta	United States	Coffee Weed Plantation	N/A
September 29, 2010	Statesboro	United States	Hurricane Branch Plantation	N/A
September 30, 2010	Carrollton	United States	VFW Fairgrounds	N/A
October 1, 2010	Macon	United States	Luther Williams Field	N/A
2011
September 29, 2011	Clemson	United States	Clemson University	N/A
September 30, 2011	Athens	United States	Tucker Plantation	N/A
October 1, 2011	Macon	United States	Luther Williams Field	N/A
October 5, 2011	Statesboro	United States	Longneedle Farm	N/A
October 6, 2011	Valdosta	United States	Coffee Weed Plantation	N/A
October 7, 2011	Carrollton	United States	VFW Fairgrounds	N/A
2012
October 3, 2012	Claxton	United States	Longneedle Farm	The Peach Pickers; Chanice Neal; Cole Swindell
October 4, 2012	Clemson	United States	Campus Beach	The Peach Pickers; Chanice Neal; Cole Swindell
October 5, 2012	Auburn	United States	Adams Farm	The Peach Pickers; Chanice Neal; Cole Swindell
October 6, 2012	Valdosta	United States	Valdosta State University	The Peach Pickers; Chanice Neal; Cole Swindell
October 10, 2012	Villa Rica	United States	University of West Georgia	The Peach Pickers; Chanice Neal; Cole Swindell
October 11, 2012	Colbert	United States	Tucker Plantation	The Peach Pickers; Chanice Neal; Cole Swindell
October 12, 2012	Tallahassee	United States	Florida State University	The Peach Pickers; Chanice Neal; Cole Swindell
October 13, 2012	Macon	United States	Midway at Central City Park	The Peach Pickers; Chanice Neal; Cole Swindell
2013
October 2, 2013	Statesboro	United States	Perry's Field	Chanice Neal; Cole Swindell; The Peach Pickers
October 3, 2013	Athens	United States	Wild Winds Farms	Chanice Neal; Cole Swindell; The Peach Pickers
October 4, 2013	Columbia	United States	Culler Farms	Chanice Neal; Cole Swindell; The Peach Pickers
October 5, 2013	Macon	United States	Midway at Central City Park	Chanice Neal; Cole Swindell; The Peach Pickers
October 9, 2013	Villa Rica	United States	V-Plex	Chanice Neal; Cole Swindell; The Peach Pickers
October 10, 2013	Auburn	United States	Ingram Farms	Chanice Neal; Cole Swindell; The Peach Pickers
October 11, 2013	Tallahassee	United States	Tallahassee Automobile Museum	Chanice Neal; Cole Swindell; The Peach Pickers
October 12, 2013	Valdosta	United States	Valdosta Wake Compound	Chanice Neal; Cole Swindell; The Peach Pickers
2014
October 1, 2014	Knoxville	United States	Maple Lane Farms	Cole Swindell; The Peach Pickers; Chanice Neal; DJ Rock
October 2, 2014	Auburn	United States	Ingram Farms	Cole Swindell; The Peach Pickers; Chanice Neal; DJ Rock
October 3, 2014	Tallahassee	United States	Cross Creak Place	Cole Swindell; The Peach Pickers; Chanice Neal; DJ Rock
October 4, 2014	Gainesville	United States	Whitehurst Cattle Company	Cole Swindell; The Peach Pickers; Chanice Neal; DJ Rock
October 8, 2014	Statesboro	United States	Perry Field	Cole Swindell; The Peach Pickers; Chanice Neal; DJ Rock
October 9, 2014	Athens	United States	Meldon Farm	Cole Swindell; The Peach Pickers; Chanice Neal; DJ Rock
October 10, 2014	Columbia	United States	Culler Farms	Cole Swindell; The Peach Pickers; Chanice Neal; DJ Rock
October 11, 2014	Macon	United States	Midway at Central City Park	Cole Swindell; The Peach Pickers; Chanice Neal; DJ Rock
2015
September 30, 2015	Fort Wayne	United States	M& J Farms	The Peach Pickers; Chris Janson; Chancie Neal; DJ Rock
October 1, 2015	Lexington	United States	Talon Farm & Winery	The Peach Pickers; Chris Janson; Chancie Neal; DJ Rock
October 2, 2015	Knoxville	United States	Maple Lane Farms	The Peach Pickers; Chris Janson; Chancie Neal; DJ Rock
October 3, 2015	Columbia	United States	Culler Farms	The Peach Pickers; Chris Janson; Chancie Neal; DJ Rock
October 7, 2015	Starkville	United States	Holtcamp Farms	Sam Hunt; Chris Janson; Chancie Neal; DJ Rock
October 8, 2015	Tuscaloosa	United States	Twin Creek Farms	Sam Hunt; Chris Janson; Chancie Neal; DJ Rock
October 9. 2015	Macon	United States	Midway at Central City Park	Sam Hunt; Chris Janson; Chancie Neal; DJ Rock
October 10, 2015	Valdosta	United States	MJ Taylor Farms	Sam Hunt; Chris Janson; Chancie Neal; DJ Rock
2016
October 5, 2016	Gaston	United States	Culler Farms	Chris Janson; The Peach Pickers; Granger Smith; Jon Langston
October 6, 2016	Greenback	United States	Maple Lane Farms	Chris Janson; The Peach Pickers; Granger Smith; Jon Langston
October 7, 2016	Elizabethtown	United States	Highland Farms	Chris Janson; The Peach Pickers; Granger Smith; Jon Langston
October 8, 2016	Monroeville	United States	Spangler Farms	Chris Janson; The Peach Pickers; Granger Smith; Jon Langston
October 12, 2016	Batesville	United States	FT Farms	Chris Janson; The Peach Pickers; Granger Smith; Jon Langston
October 13, 2016	Prairie Grove	United States	Ogden Ranch	Chris Janson; The Peach Pickers; Granger Smith; Jon Langston
October 14, 2016	Centralia	United States	Stowers Farm	Chris Janson; The Peach Pickers; Granger Smith; Jon Langston
October 15, 2016	Effingham	United States	Mid America Motorworks	Chris Janson; The Peach Pickers; Granger Smith; Jon Langston
2017
September 28, 2017	Lincoln	United States	Benes Farm	Jon Pardi; Adam Craig; The Peach Pickers; Jon Langston; DJ Rock
September 29, 2017	Baldwin City	United States	Don-Ale Farms	Jon Pardi; Adam Craig; The Peach Pickers; Jon Langston; DJ Rock
September 30, 2017	Boone	United States	Ziel Farm	Jon Pardi; Adam Craig; The Peach Pickers; Jon Langston; DJ Rock
October 6, 2017	Fort Wayne	United States	Spangler Farms West	Jon Pardi; Adam Craig; The Peach Pickers; Jon Langston; DJ Rock
October 7, 2017	Edinburg	United States	Ayers Family Farm	Jon Pardi; Adam Craig; The Peach Pickers; Jon Langston; DJ Rock
October 8, 2017	Centralia	United States	Stowers Farm	Jon Pardi; Adam Craig; The Peach Pickers; Jon Langston; DJ Rock
2018
September 27, 2018	Irwin	United States	Ayers Family Farm	Chase Rice; Jon Langston; The Peach Pickers; DJ Rock
September 28, 2018	Pesotum	United States	Atkins Farm	Chase Rice; Jon Langston; The Peach Pickers; DJ Rock
September 29, 2018	Boone	United States	Ziel Farm	Chase Rice; Jon Langston; The Peach Pickers; DJ Rock
October 4, 2018	Archer	United States	Whitehurst Cattle Company	Chase Rice; Jon Langston; The Peach Pickers; DJ Rock
October 5, 2018	North Augusta	United States	Misty Morning Farms	Chase Rice; Jon Langston; The Peach Pickers; DJ Rock
October 6, 2018	Ringgold	United States	Doug Yates Farm	Chase Rice; Jon Langston; The Peach Pickers; DJ Rock
2019
September 26, 2019	Marshall	United States	Statz Bros. Farm	Cole Swindell; Mitchell Tenpenny; The Peach Pickers; DJ Rock
September 27, 2019	Richland	United States	Stafford Farms	Cole Swindell; Mitchell Tenpenny; The Peach Pickers; DJ Rock
September 28, 2019	Pleasantville	United States	Miller Family Farms	Cole Swindell; Mitchell Tenpenny; The Peach Pickers; DJ Rock
October 3, 2019	Louisburg	United States	MC Farms	Cole Swindell; Mitchell Tenpenny; The Peach Pickers; DJ Rock
October 4, 2019	Douglass	United States	Flying B Ranch	Cole Swindell; Mitchell Tenpenny; The Peach Pickers; DJ Rock
October 5, 2019	Norman	United States	Adkins Farm	Cole Swindell; Mitchell Tenpenny; The Peach Pickers; DJ Rock
