= What Makes You Country =

Studio album by Luke Bryan
- Released: December 8, 2017
- Studios: Sound Stage Studios, Starstruck Studios and The Office (Nashville, Tennessee)
- Genre: Country
- Length: 51:32
- Label: Capitol Records Nashville
- Producers: Jeff Stevens; Jody Stevens

Luke Bryan chronology
Farm Tour... Here's to the Farmer (2016)	What Makes You Country (2017)	Born Here Live Here Die Here (2020)

Singles from What Makes You Country
- 1. "Light It Up" Released: August 23, 2017; 2. "Most People Are Good" Released: January 8, 2018; 3. "Sunrise, Sunburn, Sunset" Released: May 29, 2018; 4. "What Makes You Country" Released: October 22, 2018

What Makes You Country is the sixth studio album by American country music artist Luke Bryan. It was released on December 8, 2017 by Capitol Records Nashville. The album includes the singles "Light It Up", "Most People Are Good", "Sunrise, Sunburn, Sunset", and the title track.

== Critical reception ==
The Guardian reviewer Alexis Petridis rated the album 3 out of 5 stars, stating that "you'd have a hard time arguing that What Makes You Country doesn't feature some pretty bulletproof songwriting. If it sounds like mainstream pop in a pickup truck, that's partly because the melodies and structure are up to the standard of the best stuff pumped out by Swedish hit manufacturers." A mixed-to-positive review came from Variety writer Chris Willman, who wrote that the album "suggests that Bryan has zero interest in fixing what ain't broke. It's a 15-song guidebook to What Makes Him Successful, filled with good-time drinking, better-time sex, a little bit of family, and no particular sadness that can't be cured as soon as a certain ex-girlfriend texts back."

== Commercial performance ==
What Makes You Country debuted at number one on the US Billboard 200 with 108,000 album-equivalent units, of which 99,000 were pure album sales in its first week, giving Bryan his fourth US number-one album. On March 6, 2019, the album was certified gold by the Recording Industry Association of America (RIAA) for combined sales and album-equivalent units of over 500,000 units in the United States. As of April 2019, the album has sold 363,700 copies in the United States.

In Australia, the album entered at number six on the ARIA Albums Chart, becoming his second to reach the top 10 there after Kill the Lights (2015).

== Track listing ==
No.	Title	Writer(s)	Length
1.	"What Makes You Country"	Luke Bryan; Dallas Davidson; Ashley Gorley	3:55
2.	"Out of Nowhere Girl"	Bryan; Davidson; Gorley	3:38
3.	"Light It Up"	Bryan; Brad Tursi	2:57
4.	"Most People Are Good"	David Frasier; Ed Hill; Josh Kear	3:41
5.	"Sunrise, Sunburn, Sunset"	Zach Crowell; Ryan Hurd; Chase McGill	3:36
6.	"Bad Lovers"	Davidson; Kyle Fishman; Justin Wilson	3:36
7.	"Drinking Again"	David Lee Murphy; Brad Warren; Brett Warren	3:45
8.	"Land of a Million Songs"	Bryan; Jeff Stevens; Jody Stevens	3:31
9.	"Like You Say You Do"	Bryan; Gorley; Michael Carter	3:40
10.	"Hooked on It"	Bryan; Davidson; Murphy	3:17
11.	"She's a Hot One"	Carter; McGill	2:55
12.	"Hungover in a Hotel Room"	Rodney Clawson; Kear; Chris Tompkins	3:54
13.	"Pick It Up"	Bryan; Clawson; Matt Dragstrem	2:59
14.	"Driving This Thing"	Rhett Akins; Ben Hayslip; Jody Stevens	2:56
15.	"Win Life"	Clawson; Ross Copperman; Nicolle Galyon	3:12
Total length:			51:32

Vinyl Bonus Track
No.	Title	Length
16.	"I Can't Even"	2:48

== Personnel ==
Adapted from AllMusic

- Luke Bryan – lead vocals
- Mike Rojas – keyboards, acoustic piano, Rhodes electric piano, Wurlitzer electric piano, Hammond B3 organ, synthesizers, Mellotron
- Jody Stevens – programming, electric guitars
- J.T. Corenflos – electric guitars
- Kenny Greenberg – electric guitars, slide guitar
- Danny Rader – acoustic guitars, banjo, bouzouki, resonator guitar, ganjo, mandolin, tres
- Jimmie Lee Sloas – bass
- Greg Morrow – drums, percussion
- Perry Coleman – backing vocals
- Emily Weisband – backing vocals

=== Production ===
- Brian Wright – A&R
- Jeff Stevens – producer
- Jody Stevens – producer
- Derek Bason – recording, mixing
- Chris Small – recording assistant, mix assistant
- Adam Ayan – mastering at Gateway Mastering & DVD (Portland, Maine)
- Scott Johnson – production assistant
- Karen Naff – art direction
- Aaron Strickland – design
- Jim Wright – photography
- Lee Moore – wardrobe stylist
- Paula Turner – grooming
- Kerri Edwards with KPentertainment and Red Light Management – management

== Charts ==
=== Weekly charts ===
Chart (2017)	Peak position
Australian Albums (ARIA)	6
Canadian Albums (Billboard)	5
New Zealand Heatseeker Albums (RMNZ)	2
Swiss Albums (Schweizer Hitparade)	68
US Billboard 200	1
US Top Country Albums (Billboard)	1

=== Year-end charts ===
Chart (2018)	Position
Australian Country Albums (ARIA)	6
US Billboard 200	54
US Top Country Albums (Billboard)	6

Chart (2019)	Position
Australian Country Albums (ARIA)	22
US Top Country Albums (Billboard)	36

Chart (2020)	Position
Australian Country Albums (ARIA)	31

Chart (2021)	Position
Australian Country Albums (ARIA)	47

== Certifications ==
Region	Certification	Certified units/sales
Canada (Music Canada)	Gold	40,000^{‡}
United States (RIAA)	Platinum	1,000,000^{‡}
^{‡} Sales+streaming figures based on certification alone.
