= Farm Tour... Here's to the Farmer =

EP by Luke Bryan
- Released: September 23, 2016
- Genre: Country
- Length: 17:27
- Labels: Capitol Nashville; Row Crop
- Producers: Luke Bryan; Dallas Davidson; Ashley Gorley

Luke Bryan chronology
Kill the Lights (2015)	Farm Tour... Here's to the Farmer (2016)	What Makes You Country (2017)

Farm Tour... Here's to the Farmer is the eighth extended play (EP) by American country music singer Luke Bryan. It was released on September 23, 2016, by Capitol Nashville.

== Background ==
The extended play was released prior to Bryan's eighth annual Farm Tour concert series, held in October of every year. It was his first release to accompany the Farm Tour.

== Critical reception ==
Stephen Thomas Erlewine of AllMusic rated the EP three-and-a-half stars out of five, writing that Here's to the Farmer is "a bright, sentimental little record, one that feels more like the old Luke Bryan than the spangly, modern 2015 album Kill the Lights." Billy Dukes of Taste of Country described the EP as "a slice-of-life album that paints beautiful images of the American heartland," and wrote that "Bryan's storytelling is honest and his moral compass pointed true north during each song." Chuck Dauphin of Sounds Like Nashville voiced his appreciation for the more traditional country style of Here's to the Farmer, writing that "it makes for a little bit different appreciation of an artist, and shows another side of what he can do." He also said that the EP was "one of his most entertaining [bodies of work] in quite a while."

== Commercial performance ==
Farm Tour... Here's to the Farmer debuted at number four on the US Billboard 200 chart with 34,000 units, including 32,000 in traditional album sales, making it Bryan's ninth top 10 on the albums chart. It also debuted at No. 1 on the Top Country Albums chart.

== Track listing ==
Farm Tour... Here's to the Farmer
No.	Title	Writer(s)	Length
1.	"I Do All My Dreamin' There"	Craig Wiseman; Jim McCormick	3:39
2.	"Here's to the Farmer"	Luke Bryan; Michael Carter; Chase McGill	3:31
3.	"Love Me in a Field"	Bryan; Rodney Clawson; Matt Dragstrem	2:57
4.	"You Look Like Rain"	Tony Lane; Bobby Hamrick; Marti Dodson	3:55
5.	"Southern Gentleman"	Bryan; Dallas Davidson; Ashley Gorley	3:25
Total length:			17:27

== Charts ==
=== Weekly charts ===
Chart (2016)	Peak position
Canadian Albums (Billboard)	9
New Zealand Heatseekers Albums (RMNZ)	5
US Billboard 200	4
US Top Country Albums (Billboard)	1

=== Year-end charts ===
Chart (2016)	Position
US Top Country Albums (Billboard)	58
