= Clint Ford =

American actor

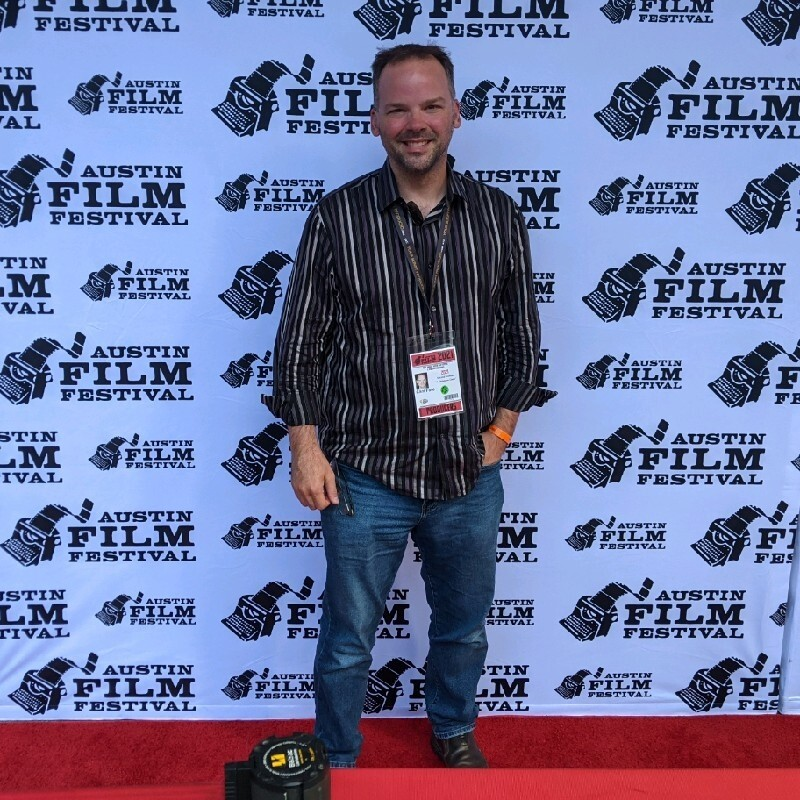
- Ford at the 2021 Austin Film Festival
- Born: January 27, 1976 (age 50); Fort Worth, Texas, U.S.
- Occupations: Writer; actor; voice artist
- Years active: 1998–present
- Notable credit(s): Star Trek Online; Dragon Ball Z Fruits Basket; Beet the Vandel Buster; B't X
- Spouse: Sarah L. Kirch
- Children: 4
- Website: http://clintford.com

Clint Ford (born January 27, 1976) is an American screenwriter, actor, voice-over artist, and novelist. He is best known for his portrayal as the Klingon M'ven, of the Great House of Martok, in the video game, Star Trek Online. Ford is also known for his work in the American dubs of Japanese anime series, such as Yû yû hakusho, Blue Gender, and Dragon Ball Z.

== Early life ==
Ford was born in Fort Worth and was raised in Bedford, Texas, and Longview, Texas. He studied Theatre Arts and Creative Writing at Western Kentucky University in Bowling Green, Kentucky. Upon his return to Texas, he lent his writing and vocal talents to the Radio Disney Network for several years.

== Career ==
Ford's first on-camera appearance was in the 1995 television series, The Hot Plate. His film debut was in the 2000 film, Stingray.

Over the years, he has written several scripts for film and television.

Ford is also known as the voice of several well-known novelty items manufactured by Gemmy Industries between 2004 and 2007, such as The Butler, Dr. Shivers, The All-Seeing Zultan, and Buck The Animated Trophy.

In 2013, Ford published his first novel, Cope.

In 2018, Ford wrote the prequel screenplay for the 13th installment of the Friday the 13th franchise, reported in November 2018 by Ain't It Cool News.

== Personal life ==
Ford currently resides in North Richland Hills, Texas, with his wife and four children.

== Filmography ==
=== Television ===
Year	Title	Role	Media	Notes
1995	The Hot Plate	Dennis	Television	Credited as "Slappy Greene"
2003	Third Coast Comedy	Featured player	Television	Various sketches

=== Film ===
Year	Title	Role
2000	Stingray	Mark/Carl

=== Animation ===
Year	Title	Role	Media	Notes
2006	B't X	Tepp	Television	Pilot only
2004–2005	Beet the Vandel Buster	Zande	Television	
2002–2006	Yû yû hakusho	Butler	Television	
2001	Fruits Basket	Additional voices	Television	
1999–2000	Lupin the 3rd	Soldier	Television	
1989–2003	Dragon Ball Z	Additional voices	Television	
1999–2017	One Piece	Vasco Shot	Television	

=== Video games ===
Year	Title	Roles
2013	Star Trek Online	M'ven / Commander Maiek / Nin-Yan / Used Ship Salesman / Klingon Bar Patron 2

== Bibliography ==
- Ford, Clint (2013). Cope. Dallas: Amazon. ISBN 978-1-49433-111-5.
