= What Makes You Country (song) =

Single by Luke Bryan

from the album What Makes You Country
- Released: October 22, 2018
- Genre: Country
- Length: 3:55
- Label: Capitol Nashville
- Songwriters: Luke Bryan; Dallas Davidson; Ashley Gorley
- Producers: Jeff Stevens; Jody Stevens

Luke Bryan singles chronology
"Sunrise, Sunburn, Sunset" (2018)	"What Makes You Country" (2018)	"Knockin' Boots" (2019)

"What Makes You Country" is a song co-written and recorded by American country music singer Luke Bryan. It was released in October 2018 as the fourth single and title track from his 2017 album of the same name. Bryan wrote this song with Dallas Davidson and Ashley Gorley.

== Content ==
Taste of Country writer Courtney Carr described the song as "an anthem of appreciation that celebrates the many, many different types of people who identify as country. In the song, Bryan makes it clear that we shouldn’t be worrying about what makes someone 'country'; rather, we should be celebrating our own unique lives." The song is an anthem with a central theme of identifying with country lifestyles.

Bryan performed the song at the 52nd Annual Country Music Association Awards on November 14, 2018, with accompaniment from Lindsay Ell, Ashley McBryde, Chris Janson, Luke Combs, Jon Pardi, and Cole Swindell.

== Charts ==
"What Makes You Country" peaked at number 2 on the Billboard Country Airplay chart (having been blocked from number one by Luke Combs' "Beautiful Crazy"), and at number 7 on the Hot Country Songs chart, becoming Bryan's first single to miss number one on either chart since "Country Girl (Shake It for Me)" peaked at number 4 in 2011, thus ending a streak of eighteen consecutive number one singles for him. It did, however, reach number one on the Billboard Canada Country chart.

=== Weekly charts ===
Chart (2018–2019)	Peak position
Canada Hot 100 (Billboard)	80
Canada Country (Billboard)	1
US Billboard Hot 100	54
US Country Airplay (Billboard)	2
US Hot Country Songs (Billboard)	7

=== Year-end charts ===
Chart (2019)	Position
US Country Airplay (Billboard)	38
US Hot Country Songs (Billboard)	52

== Certifications ==
Region	Certification	Certified units/sales
United States (RIAA)	Platinum	1,000,000^{‡}
^{‡} Sales+streaming figures based on certification alone.
