= Big Mouth Billy Bass =

Animatronic singing prop

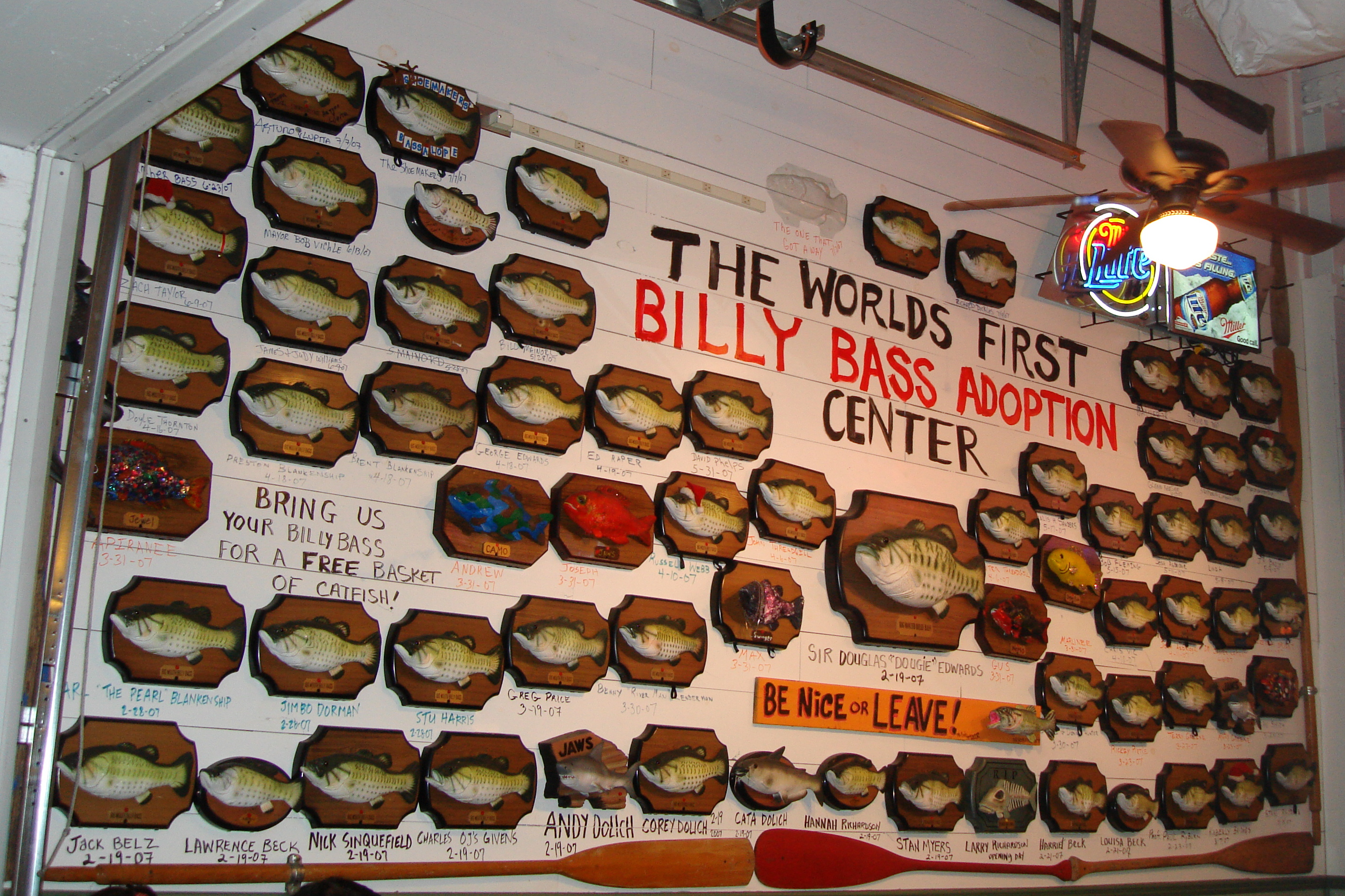
- Type: Novelty animatronic
- Company: Gemmy Industries
- Country: United States
- Availability: 1999–present
- Materials: Latex rubber, plastic
- Features: Motion detection, singing fish

Big Mouth Billy Bass is an animatronic singing prop, representing a largemouth bass, invented by Gemmy Industries in 1998. They became popular in the late 1990s to early 2000s.

== Gemmy Industries ==
Gemmy Industries (/ˈdʒɛmi/) is an American novelty manufacturing company, best known for its animatronic and inflatable characters. It is currently headquartered in Coppell, Texas. Founded in 1984, the company originally began producing ballpoint pens. Gemmy eventually ventured into novelty manufacturing, and in 2000, it achieved success with the Big Mouth Billy Bass. Following that success, the company began predominantly making animatronic figures focused on the Christmas and Halloween seasons. The company distributes products internationally, especially to the United Kingdom and Japan.

== Design and features ==
The fish is made of a soft polyvinyl chloride with an internal plastic mechanical skeleton. At first glance, the product appears to be a mounted game fish. The item was conceived by a Gemmy Industries product development vice president following his visit to a Bass Pro Shop. The mounted fish turns its head, wiggles its tail on the trophy plaque, and sings cover songs, such as "Don't Worry, Be Happy" (1988) by Bobby McFerrin; and "Take Me to the River" (1974) by Al Green. Teenie Hodges, who co-wrote "Take Me to the River" with Green, said in a 2013 interview that he received more royalties from Big Mouth Billy Bass sales than from any other recordings of the song.

On the original prototype, the unit activated by a motion sensor, designed to startle a passerby. In production, an additional button was added.

== Spin-offs and other versions ==
There have been many variants of Big Mouth Billy Bass produced by Gemmy. These use different types of game fish and aquatic animals. Variants include Big Mouth Billy Bones (a skeleton fish that sings "Bad to the Bone" by George Thorogood and the Destroyers), Travis the Singing Trout (a rainbow trout that sings "Do Wah Diddy Diddy" by Jeff Barry and Ellie Greenwich; and "Rock the Boat" by The Hues Corporation), Cool Catfish (a catfish that sings "Bad to the Bone"), Rocky the Singing Lobster (a lobster that sings "Sea Cruise" by Frankie Ford and "Rock the Boat"), Lucky the Lobster (a lobster that sings "Do Wah Diddy Diddy" and "Rock the Boat"), Willy (a trout that sings "Do Wah Diddy Diddy" and "Rock the Boat"), and Frankie the Fish (a blue cod fish from a McDonald's Filet-O-Fish commercial that sings an original song called "Give Me Back That Filet-O-Fish" plus a remix).

The concept was later adapted into a large mounted deer head, known as Buck – the Animated Trophy (voiced by Clint Ford) as well as a medium-sized mounted bear head.

On December 7, 1999, a special holiday version of the Big Mouth Billy Bass was released. The fish had a Santa hat on his head and a ribbon with a sleigh bell on his tail. An anniversary edition followed in 2014.

A version from 2000 features a great white shark which plays John Williams's theme from Jaws and a cover of Bobby Darin's version of "Mack the Knife".

In 2001, a version named "Big Mouth Billy Bass Superstar" was released. This spin-off features Billy Bass standing upright on a base with a microphone in his hand. The first version sang "Stayin' Alive" and "Act Naturally", and a later revised version replaced "Stayin' Alive" with "I Will Survive". An exclusive version was sold only in France, with the songs "Don't Worry Be Happy" and "I Will Survive".

In 2018, Gemmy Industries partnered with Amazon to create an Amazon Alexa-enabled version of the animatronic. This variant pairs with any Amazon Echo device through Bluetooth, and it will move its mouth when responding to Alexa commands. It also shakes its tail when playing music through Amazon Music but does not lip sync to songs. When not connected to an Alexa device, the fish sings an original song titled "Fishin' Time" when its red button is pushed.

In late 2021, TikTok user Kevin Heckart hacked a Big Mouth Billy Bass to not only lip-sync to any voice track or song, but to also dance via head and tail movements to whatever song is played through any smart speaker connections. Heckart later made a similar hack to the Cool Catfish and Frankie the Fish by the same company along with Loftus International's Tommy Trout as well as an orange Chinese knockoff of the Big Mouth Billy Bass 15th Anniversary Edition in mid-2022, all of them synced to an Amazon Alexa playing Nathan Evans's cover of The Wellerman.

A remake of the original Big Mouth Billy Bass was released in 2021. This new version cut "Don't Worry Be Happy" by Bobby McFerrin for Luke Bryan's 2015 "Huntin', Fishin' and Lovin' Every Day" in addition to Talking Heads' 1978 iteration of "Take Me to the River".

In August 2024, a Billy Bass-inspired "As seen on TV" product called "Trumpy Trout", an animatronic trout head that resembles Donald Trump, was released. When activated, Trumpy Trout repeated fish-themed parody phrases of familiar Trump pastiches, such as "I'm building a new pond, and the bass will pay for it."

As part of Green Day's Dookie Demastered, a 30th-anniversary edition of their third studio album Dookie in which each song appeared on a separate novelty format, "Basket Case" was released on a Big Mouth Billy Bass rechristened the "Big Mouth Billie Bass". Big Mouth Billie Bass was given out on a drawing, along with the rest of the album, October 11. The project was a collaboration with Los Angeles art studio BRAIN.

In early 2025, a video showing two prototype 25th Anniversary versions of Billy Bass was found. The video shows two versions of Billy Bass, one being a standard version, singing "Take Me To The River" and a re-recording of "I Will Survive", and a Christmas version, singing "Fancy Like Christmas" and a parody of "Jingle Bells". As of February 2026, neither prototype has been released.

Also in 2025, a 25th Anniversary Billy Bass was released, but only in Canada. It sings a parody of "Rockin' Robin".

== In popular culture ==
It was reported that Elizabeth II had a Big Mouth Billy Bass displayed on the grand piano of Balmoral Castle. The Netflix drama The Crown incorrectly depicts Prince Andrew giving it to her as a birthday present in 1997.

The success of the Big Mouth Billy Bass has led to several pop culture appearances, including product placements. Some of the device's notable appearances include The Simpsons, The Magicians, Family Guy, The Sopranos, King of the Hill, WALL-E, VeggieTales, The Pirates! Band of Misfits, The Office, Peppa Pig, What We Do in the Shadows, The Act of Killing, We Bare Bears, Solar Opposites, Big City Greens, King Tweety, Arthur, Zig & Sharko, Barbie, Phineas and Ferb, The Electric State and Toy Story 5.
