= Kill the Lights (Luke Bryan album) =

Studio album by Luke Bryan
- Released: August 7, 2015
- Studios: Ocean Way Nashville, Starstruck Studios and The Office (Nashville, Tennessee)
- Genre: Country
- Length: 46:35
- Label: Capitol Records Nashville
- Producers: Jeff Stevens; Jody Stevens

Luke Bryan chronology
| Crash My Party (2013) | Kill the Lights (2015) | Farm Tour... Here's to the Farmer (2016) |

Singles from Kill the Lights
- 1. "Kick the Dust Up" Released: May 19, 2015; 2. "Strip It Down" Released: August 4, 2015; 3. "Home Alone Tonight" Released: November 23, 2015; 4. "Huntin', Fishin' and Lovin' Every Day" Released: March 14, 2016; 5. "Move" Released: July 25, 2016; 6. "Fast" Released: November 28, 2016

Kill the Lights is the fifth studio album by American country music artist Luke Bryan. It was released on August 7, 2015 by Capitol Records Nashville. The album's lead single, "Kick the Dust Up", was released to country radio on May 19, 2015. "Strip It Down" was released as the second single from the album on August 4, 2015. The album's third single, "Home Alone Tonight", was released to country radio on November 23, 2015. The album's fourth single, "Huntin', Fishin' and Lovin' Every Day" released to country radio on March 14, 2016. The album's fifth single, "Move" released to country radio on July 25, 2016. All five singles reached number one on the Billboard Country Airplay chart, making Bryan the first country music artist ever to have five number one singles from two albums apiece. In November 2016, the album's sixth single, "Fast", was sent to country radio. With "Fast" also reaching number one in April 2017, Bryan became the first artist in the chart's history to achieve six number one singles from one album. Kill the Lights garnered more positive reviews from music critics than Bryan's previous albums. The album debuted at number one on the US Billboard 200 chart, moving 345,000 album-equivalent units in the week ending of August 13.

== Critical reception ==
Professional ratings
Aggregate scores
| Source | Rating |
|---|---|
| Metacritic | 69/100 |
Review scores
| Source | Rating |
| AllMusic | 4/5 stars |
| Billboard | 3.5/5 stars |
| Entertainment Weekly | B |
| Nash Country Weekly | B |
| New York Daily News | 2/5 stars |
| The Oakland Press | B |
| PopMatters | 7/10 stars |
| Rolling Stone | 3/5 stars |
| Spin | 6/10 |
| USA Today | 3/4 stars |

Kill the Lights has received mostly positive reviews from music critics. At Metacritic, which assigns a "weighted average" rating out of 100 from selected independent ratings and reviews from mainstream critics, the album received a Metascore of 69/100, based on nine reviews, indicating "generally favorable" reviews. Stephen Thomas Erlewine of AllMusic rates the album four stars conveying: "Kill the Lights winds up feeling happy and generous, an inclusive record that plays to teenage desires as effectively as memories of an adolescence left behind." The publication Billboard rates the album three and a half stars, and Jewly Hight commenting: "the fact that Kill the Lights features a pensive, black-and-white cover shot – the rare photo in which he's not smiling even a little – is a hint: He isn't simply going about his business-as-usual fun on this album." Brian Mansfield rates the album three stars out of four at USA Today proffering: "The hits are fine, but that's the guy who's really worth getting to know." Maura Johnston gives the album a positive review on behalf of The Boston Globe suggesting: "Bryan might have broken up with spring break, but crashing pop's party will probably offer him just as good a time."

The Oakland Press's Gary Graff rates the album a B submitting: "Bryan has found his lane, and he doesn't mess with it on 'Kill The Lights,' a characteristically likable collection of friendly come-ons, lost love laments and sentimental odes to gravel roads and car rides to the nearest big town...It's solid from start to finish, refining what fans know and, mostly, love about Bryan's music and ensuring that his career lights will continue to shine for the foreseeable future." Dave Heaton rates the album a seven for PopMatters espousing: "So bro-country this is, in that the women are shadows and might be figments of the man's imagination." Entertainment Weekly's Madison Vain rates the album a B asserting: "Considering Crash's success, messing with the formula on Kill the Lights would be a calculated risk. And Lights is nothing if not calculating." The magazine Nash Country Weekly's Bob Paxman rates the album a B claiming: "Kill the Lights isn't consistently pleasing, but it does represent a progression and evolution from Luke's previous material." The Plain Dealer's Chuck Yarborough rates the album a B− claiming: "It's a new phase. And a welcome one." Glenn Gamboa from Newsday rates the album a B+ surmising: "Experimenting is good, but sometimes sticking to what you know is even better."

Rolling Stone's Will Hermes rates the album three stars believing: "Bryan's fifth studio album is well-turned Nashville radio bait, trite yet undeniable, sure to drive up bar tabs in 50 states and beyond." The publication Spin rates the album a six out of ten, and has Brad Shoup claiming: "Kill the Lights sees him both at an apex and a crossroads". Jim Faber rates the album two stars for the New York Daily News criticizing: "He serves up several ballads, which salute hunting, fishing, and scarecrows...None are particularly convincing, given the anchor-man blandness of Bryan's vocals." Mikael Wood offering a mixed review at the Los Angeles Times suggesting: "Yet Bryan, never a particularly flexible singer, sounds even more wooden than usual in these tracks; for the first time, this 39-year-old father of two seems a bit embarrassed here, which threatens to topple the whole enterprise. If he's not having fun, how are we supposed to?" The New York Times' Jon Caramanica gives a review pondering: "Mr. Bryan's fifth studio album, is his most mature, and almost studiously un-fun...Mr. Bryan is trading in his youthful vim for something more measured...For just a few seconds in each one, he hit that slow gyration of the hips that he's known for, and he looked like a man at peace."

== Commercial performance ==
Upon its release, Kill the Lights and Compton by Dr. Dre were poised to make their entries at the top of the US Billboard 200 chart; each of those has sold over 300,000 units. In the issue of August 29, the album debuted atop the chart, selling 345,000 album-equivalent units (including 320,000 pure album sales) in the week ending August 13. As a result, this became Bryan's third number-one album on the chart, and the third-biggest selling week for an album in 2015 (behind If You're Reading This It's Too Late by Drake and To Pimp a Butterfly by Kendrick Lamar, respectively). As it combined with Compton — which sold 295,000 equivalent units (276,000 traditional album sales) and entered the chart at number 2 in the same issue, the two albums have earned 640,000 units overall. This marked the first time two albums have garnered at least 294,000 units since December 2014. In addition, Kill the Lights also debuted at number one on the US Billboard Top Country Albums chart, making this Bryan's sixth album in his career to ever reach the position. The following week, music industry forecasters predicted that Kill the Lights could spend its second consecutive week atop the chart, with about 90,000 units sold in the week ending August 20. On the chart dated September 5, the album held the top spot for two weeks, selling 99,000 equivalent units. This made it the first country music album to stay more than one week at the top position since 2013 (following his Crash My Party in 2013, which spent its second and final week atop the chart in the issue of September 7, 2013).

In late-2015, the album became the tenth highest-selling album of the year in the US, having sold 851,000 copies. The album was certified Platinum by the RIAA on February 8, 2016. In July 2016, the album reached its million sales mark in the US, becoming Bryan's fourth album to do so. The album was certified 2× platinum on July 17, 2017, by the RIAA. As of November 2017, the album has sold at least 1,195,100 copies in the US.

In Canada, the album entered the Canadian Albums Chart at number 2, selling 22,000 copies in its debut week. That was the second biggest country music debut of 2015, behind Yoan Garneau's Yoan.

== Track listing ==
Kill the Lights — Standard version
| No. | Title | Writer(s) | Length |
|---|---|---|---|
| 1. | "Kick the Dust Up" | Dallas Davidson; Chris DeStefano; Ashley Gorley | 3:10 |
| 2. | "Kill the Lights" | Luke Bryan; Jody Stevens; Jeff Stevens | 2:59 |
| 3. | "Strip It Down" | Bryan; Jon Nite; Ross Copperman | 4:01 |
| 4. | "Home Alone Tonight" (featuring Karen Fairchild) | Jody Stevens; Cole Taylor; Jaida Dreyer; Tommy Cecil | 3:10 |
| 5. | "Razor Blade" | Jeff Hyde; Ryan Tyndell; Rodney Clawson | 3:41 |
| 6. | "Fast" | Bryan; Clawson; Luke Laird | 3:26 |
| 7. | "Move" | Bryan; Michael Carter; Jay Clementi | 3:47 |
| 8. | "Just Over" | Chase McGill; Brad Tursi; Jessie Jo Dillon | 3:13 |
| 9. | "Love It Gone" | Jody Stevens; Clementi | 3:38 |
| 10. | "Way Way Back" | Bryan; Gorley; Clawson | 3:19 |
| 11. | "To the Moon and Back" | Tom Douglas; Hillary Lindsey; Tony Lane | 3:58 |
| 12. | "Huntin', Fishin' and Lovin' Every Day" | Bryan; Davidson; Rhett Akins; Ben Hayslip | 4:38 |
| 13. | "Scarecrows" | Gorley; Trevor Rosen; Shane McAnally | 3:38 |
| Total length: | | | 46:38 |

Kill the Lights — Deluxe Edition (Digital/Streaming; Target exclusive CD)
| No. | Title | Writer(s) | Length |
|---|---|---|---|
| 14. | "Corner Booth" | Bryan; Cole Swindell; Jimmy Robbins | 3:20 |
| 15. | "Little Boys Grow Up and Dogs Get Old" | Bryan; Lane | 3:44 |
| 16. | "Buddies" | Bryan; Davidson | 3:29 |
| Total length: | | | 57:11 |

== Personnel ==
Adapted from AllMusic:

- Luke Bryan – vocals
- Mike Rojas – acoustic piano, synthesizers, Hammond B3 organ
- Jeff Stevens – keyboards, electric guitar, backing vocals
- Jody Stevens – keyboards, programming, acoustic guitar, electric guitar, banjo, backing vocals
- J.T. Corenflos – electric guitar
- Kenny Greenberg – electric guitar
- Adam Shoenfeld – electric guitar
- Ilya Toshinsky – acoustic guitar, electric guitar, banjo, bouzouki, mandolin
- Eddy Dunlap – pedal steel guitar
- Mark Hill – bass
- Jimmie Lee Sloas – bass
- Shannon Forrest – drums
- Greg Morrow – drums
- Aubrey Haynie – fiddle, mandolin
- Perry Coleman – backing vocals
- Hillary Lindsey – backing vocals
- Jenifer Wrinkle – backing vocals
- Karen Fairchild – vocals (track 4)

=== Production ===
- Brian Wright – A&R
- Jeff Stevens – producer
- Jody Stevens – producer
- Derek Bason – recording, mixing
- Chris Small – recording assistant, digital editing
- Adam Ayan – mastering at Gateway Mastering (Portland, Maine)
- Scott Johnson – production assistant
- Karen Naff – art direction
- Wendy Stamberger – design
- Jim Wright – front cover and back cover photography, booklet photos (pages 3, 4 & 12)
- Carlos Ruiz – booklet photos (pages 6, 9 & 10)
- Paula Turner – grooming
- Lee Moore – wardrobe
- Kerri Edwards with KPentertainment – management
- Red Light Management – management

== Charts ==
=== Album ===
==== Weekly charts ====
| Chart (2015–16) | Peak position |
|---|---|
| Australian Albums (ARIA) | 4 |
| Australian Country Albums (ARIA) | 1 |
| Canadian Albums (Billboard) | 1 |
| New Zealand Albums (RMNZ) | 32 |
| Swiss Albums (Schweizer Hitparade) | 100 |
| UK Albums (Official Charts) | 47 |
| UK Country Albums (Official Charts) | 2 |
| US Billboard 200 | 1 |
| US Top Country Albums (Billboard) | 1 |

==== Year-end charts ====
| Chart (2015) | Position |
|---|---|
| Canadian Albums (Billboard) | 22 |
| US Billboard 200 | 18 |
| US Top Country Albums (Billboard) | 2 |
| Chart (2016) | Position |
| Canadian Albums (Billboard) | 28 |
| US Billboard 200 | 29 |
| US Top Country Albums (Billboard) | 6 |
| Chart (2017) | Position |
| US Billboard 200 | 89 |
| US Top Country Albums (Billboard) | 15 |
| Chart (2018) | Position |
| US Country Albums (Billboard) | 39 |

==== Decade-end charts ====
| Chart (2010–2019) | Position |
|---|---|
| US Billboard 200 | 119 |
| US Top Country Albums (Billboard) | 16 |

== Certifications ==
| Region | Certification | Certified units/sales |
|---|---|---|
| Canada (Music Canada) | Gold | 40,000^{^} |
| United States (RIAA) | 3× Platinum | 3,000,000^{‡} |
^{^} Shipments figures based on certification alone.^{‡} Sales+streaming figures based on certification alone.

== See also ==
- List of number-one albums of 2015 (Canada)
- List of Billboard 200 number-one albums of 2015
