= Tallahassee Automobile Museum =

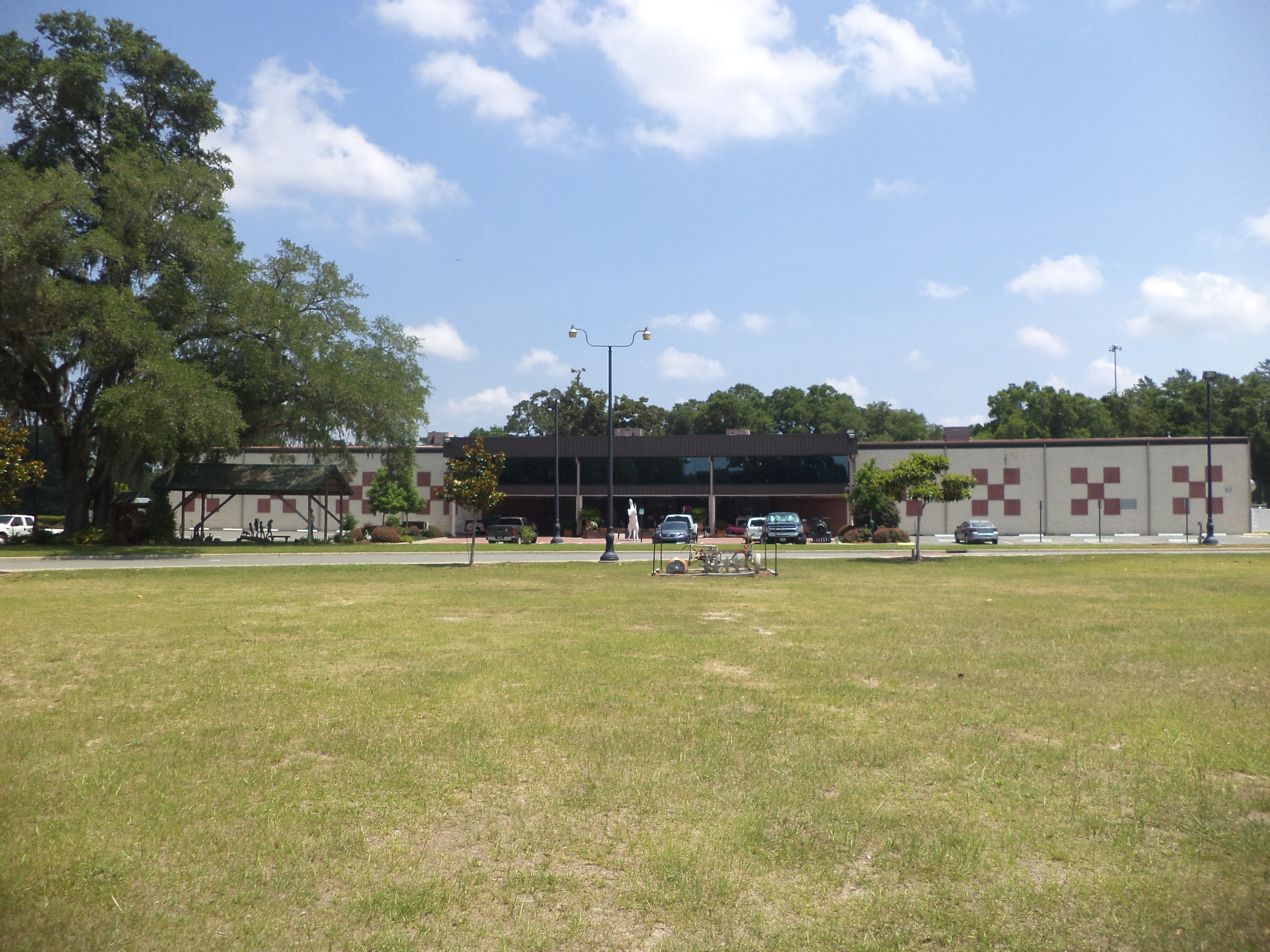
- Established: 1996
- Location: 6800 Mahan Drive; Tallahassee, Florida
- Coordinates: 30.48642°N 84.16245°W
- Type: Automobile museum, Collectibles
- Website: www.tacm.com

The Tallahassee Automobile Museum (TACM), also known as the Tallahassee Automobile and Collectibles Museum, is an automobile museum in Tallahassee, Leon County, Florida. The museum is owned by Tallahassee-based businessman DeVoe L. Moore, and primarily showcases items of Americana from Moore's personal collection.

The museum's collection includes over 170 automobiles, Steinway grand pianos, die-cast toy cars, pedal cars, antique boating items, golf memorabilia, Hit and Miss motors, brass cash registers, clocks, bicycles, boats, sports memorabilia, motorcycles, can openers, spark plugs, artifacts and memorabilia. The collection includes three Batmobiles, an 1894 Duryea, a 1931 Duesenberg Model J Double Cowl Phaeton Convertible, 1911 Ford Model T Torpedo Run About, 1955 Kayser Darrin Roadster, a Delorean and a 1948 Tucker.

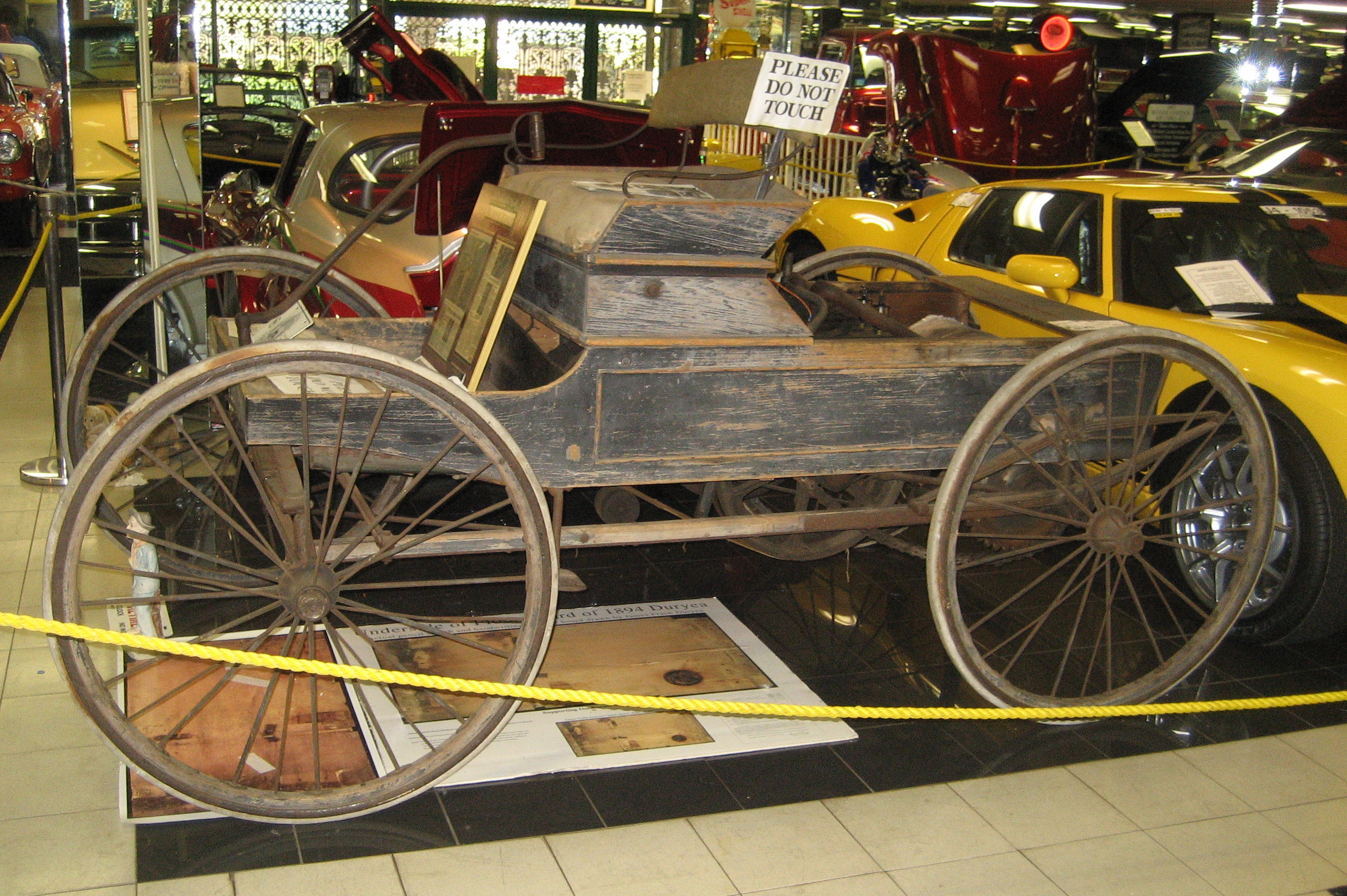
1894 Duryea Motor Wagon Company

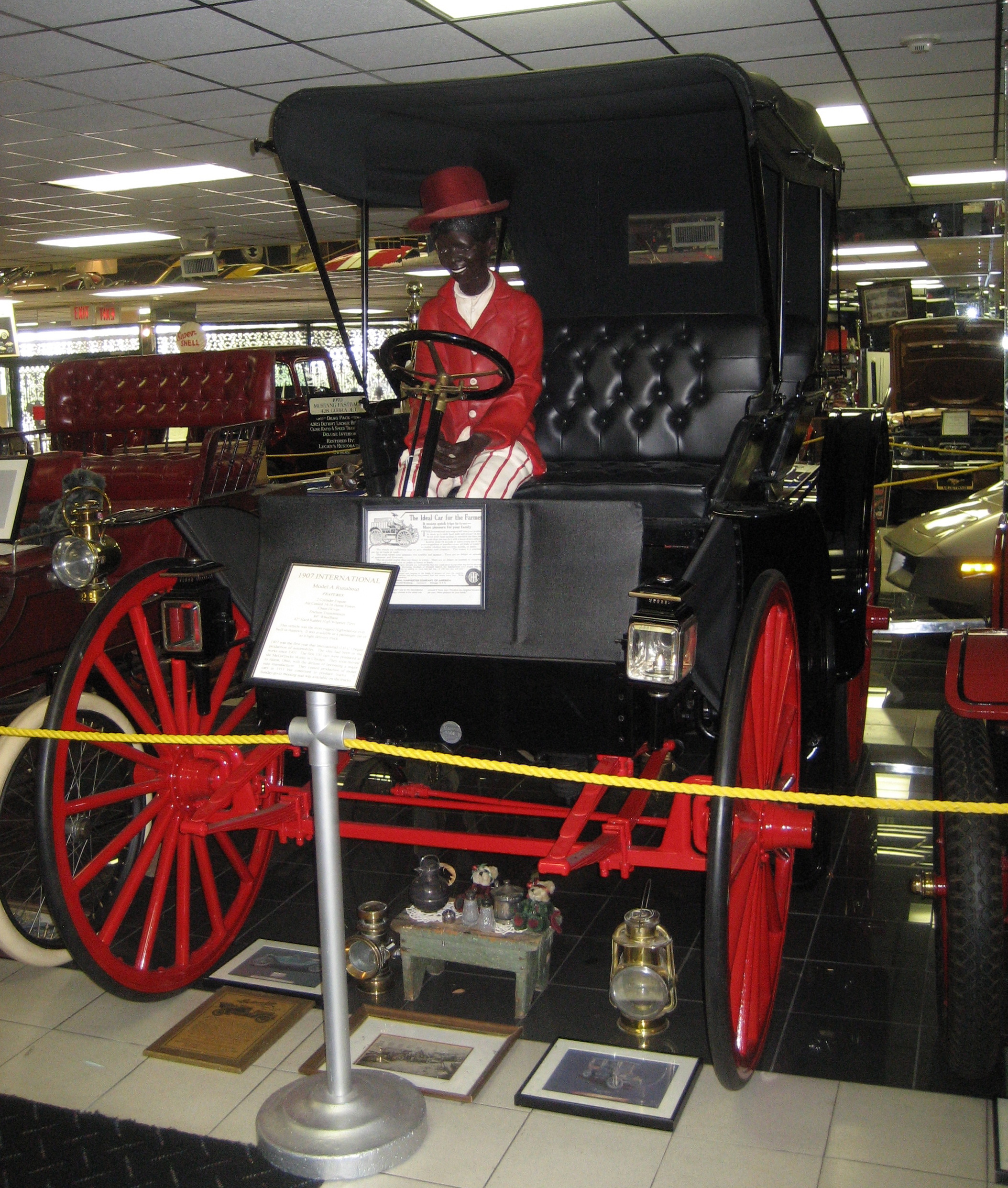
1907 International Runabout

The site is also known for its place, as during the 2016 presidential election, US president Donald Trump held a campaign rally on October 25, 2016, in the water buffalo pasture next door in which 20,000 people attended. Part of the property was sold to Amazon for a distribution center for $38 million. It opened in late 2023.
