= Clare Dunn =

American singer-songwriter

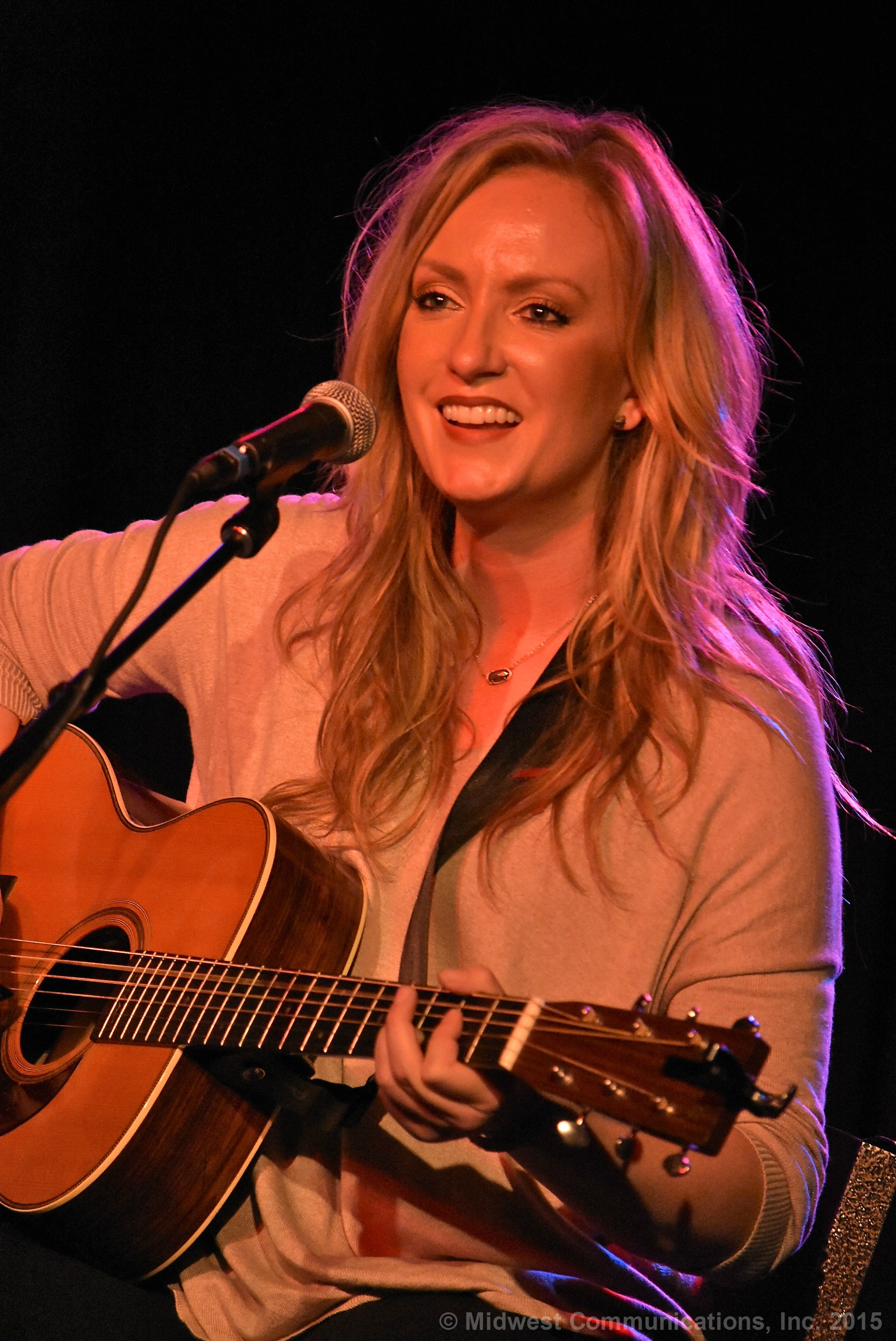
- Dunn in performance for Y100's Bra Country Concert on October 14th at the new "Backstage At The Meyer" in downtown Green Bay to benefit the Breast Cancer Family Foundation in 2015

Background information
- Born: April 27, 1987 (age 39)
- Origin: Two Buttes, Colorado, U.S.
- Genres: Country
- Instruments: Vocals; Guitar
- Years active: 2013–present
- Label: MCA Nashville
- Website: claredunn.com

Clare Dunn (born April 27, 1987) is an American country musician from southeast Colorado. After support from satellite radio as a "Highway Find" on The Highway (Sirius XM), she signed with Universal Music Group Nashville and BMG. She has opened for many notable country acts such as Florida Georgia Line, Luke Bryan, Bob Seger, Chris Young, Miranda Lambert, Keith Urban, Hank Williams Jr., and Trace Adkins.

== Career ==
After moving to Nashville, Tennessee, Dunn sang backing vocals on Luke Bryan's "Country Girl (Shake It for Me)".

Dunn released her debut single, "Get Out," on December 17, 2013, and subsequently became the highest charting independent female artist on the Music Row Country Breakout chart in ten years. She released her second single, "Cowboy Side of You," on August 11, 2014. Dunn was also listed by Sounds Like Nashville as one of the artists to watch for 2017 in country music.

Two more singles from her self-titled EP — "Move On" and "Tuxedo" — were released in 2015 and 2016, respectively, and both charted on the Billboard Hot Country Songs and Country Airplay charts. Dunn's fifth single to country radio, "More," was released on June 4, 2018. In March 2020 Dunn parted ways with MCA Nashville. In May 2020, it was announced that Clare has joined Big Yellow Dog Music and released "Safe Haven" on May 1, 2020. A new single called "Salt and Lime" was released on May 22, 2020. Honestly: A Personal Collection EP was released on June 12, 2020, as her first release with Big Yellow Dog Music.

== Personal life ==
In June 2021, Dunn was assaulted by a Lyft driver in Nashville.

In November 2024, shortly after the United States presidential elections, Dunn expressed her endorsement and support of Donald Trump. She followed it up shortly afterwards with a video clarifying that she loved everyone irrespective of their political beliefs, and that in a true democracy everyone should have the right to disagree with each other.

== Discography ==
=== Extended plays ===
Title	Details	Peak chart positions		Sales
Title	Details	US Country	US Heat	Sales
Clare Dunn	Release date: September 18, 2015; Label: MCA Nashville	31	13	US: 8,600

=== Singles ===
Year	Single	Peak chart positions		Sales	Album
Year	Single	US Country	US Country Airplay	Sales	Album
2013	"Get Out"	—	—		—N/a
2014	"Cowboy Side of You"	—	—		Clare Dunn
2015	"Move On"	48	45		Clare Dunn
2016	"Tuxedo"	45	51	US: 93,000	Clare Dunn
2018	"More"	—	60		—N/a
"—" denotes releases that did not chart

=== Music videos ===
Year	Video	Director
2015	"Move On"	TK McKamy
2016	"Tuxedo"	Kristin Barlowe
