= I Don't Want This Night to End =

Single by Luke Bryan

from the album Tailgates & Tanlines
- Released: September 5, 2011
- Recorded: 2011
- Genre: Country
- Length: 3:40
- Label: Capitol Nashville
- Songwriters: Luke Bryan; Dallas Davidson; Rhett Akins; Ben Hayslip
- Producer: Jeff Stevens

Luke Bryan singles chronology
"Country Girl (Shake It for Me)" (2011)	"I Don't Want This Night to End" (2011)	"Drunk on You" (2012)

"I Don't Want This Night to End" is a song co-written and recorded by American country music artist Luke Bryan. It was released in September 2011 as the second single from his album Tailgates & Tanlines. The song, written by Bryan, Rhett Akins, Dallas Davidson and Ben Hayslip, is a "guy meets girl" love story.

The song received positive reviews from critics who praised the simplistic writing and catchy chorus. "I Don't Want This Night to End" peaked at number one on the US Billboard Hot Country Songs chart, giving Bryan his third number-one country music hit in both charts and starting a streak of eighteen consecutive number one hits for him. This streak ended in 2019 when "What Makes You Country" peaked at number 7 on Hot Country Songs, and number 2 on Country Airplay. It also charted at number 22 on the Hot 100 chart, the same position as his previous single "Country Girl (Shake It for Me)". The song was certified 7× Platinum by the Recording Industry Association of America (RIAA), and has sold 2,730,000 copies in the United States as of November 2025. The song achieved minor chart success in Canada, peaking at number 48 on the Canadian Hot 100 chart. It also garnered a Platinum certification from Music Canada, selling over 80,000 copies in that country.

The accompanying music video was directed by Shaun Silva and features actress Cameron Richardson as Bryan's love interest.

== Content ==
Bryan told The Boot that the song is about "a guy meeting a girl, and it's the first night that they're hanging out. It's a magical night and he doesn't want it to end. It's got a big fun chorus in it." He co-wrote the song with Rhett Akins, Dallas Davidson, and Ben Hayslip, collectively known as The Peach Pickers. After Hayslip provided the title, Bryan began playing a melody on a guitar. Hayslip then said that his publisher, Randy Gaston, recommended that he write "a song that talks about putting your hands up in the chorus".

The song is set in the key of A minor and has a moderate tempo of approximately 112 beats per minute. The verses use a chord pattern of Am-G-Fsus2 three times, with a C-G-F pattern twice on the chorus followed by the original pattern of Am-G-Fsus2 twice. It ends on the Fsus2 chord.

== Critical reception ==
Billy Dukes of Taste of Country gave the song four stars out of five, calling the chorus "pretty memorable" and saying that the writers "did a nice job of not over-thinking things." Matt Bjorke of Roughstock gave the song three and a half stars of five, writing that the chorus is "infectious and sing-a-long ready" and the song is "strong, well-written" and "sounds great on the radio, just like it will in concerts."

Billboard and American Songwriter ranked "I Don't Want This Night to End" at number four and number one, respectively, on their lists of the 10 greatest Luke Bryan songs.

== Music video ==
The music video was directed by Shaun Silva and premiered on November 8, 2011. Bryan portrays a country music star who falls for a new girl (played by actress Cameron Richardson) while he is home from the road. The video is a prequel to the music video for "Drunk On You" which was later released as a single.

== Commercial performance ==
"I Don't Want This Night to End" debuted at number 44 on the U.S. Billboard Hot Country Songs chart for the week of September 17, 2011. It debuted at number 90 on the U.S. Billboard Hot 100 chart for the week of October 15, 2011. The song was certified seven times platinum by the RIAA on November 7, 2025. As of August 2015, the song has sold 2,730,000 copies in the US.

It debuted at number 80 on Canadian Hot 100 chart for the week of November 5, 2011.

== Charts and certifications ==
=== Weekly charts ===
Chart (2011–2012)	Peak position
US Hot Country Songs (Billboard)	1
US Billboard Hot 100	22
Canada Hot 100 (Billboard)	48
Canada Country (Billboard)	1

=== Year-end charts ===
Chart (2011)	Position
US Country Songs (Billboard)	87

Chart (2012)	Position
US Billboard Hot 100	93
US Country Songs (Billboard)	17

=== Certifications ===
Region	Certification	Certified units/sales
Canada (Music Canada)	Platinum	80,000^{*}
United States (RIAA)	7× Platinum	7,000,000^{‡}
^{*} Sales figures based on certification alone.^{‡} Sales+streaming figures based on certification alone.
