= Sunrise, Sunburn, Sunset =

Single by Luke Bryan

from the album What Makes You Country
- Released: May 29, 2018
- Genre: Country
- Length: 3:36
- Label: Capitol Nashville
- Songwriter(s): Zach Crowell; Ryan Hurd; Chase McGill
- Producer(s): Jeff Stevens; Jody Stevens

Luke Bryan singles chronology
"Most People Are Good" (2018)	"Sunrise, Sunburn, Sunset" (2018)	"What Makes You Country" (2018)

"Sunrise, Sunburn, Sunset" is a song written by Zach Crowell, Ryan Hurd, and Chase McGill and recorded by American country music singer Luke Bryan. It was released in May 2018 as the third single from Bryan's 2017 album What Makes You Country.

== Content and history ==
The song recalls a summertime romance between two teenaged protagonists. The narrator falls in love with a girl after being hired to paint the girl's father's house.

Bryan debuted the song on the May 2018 finale of American Idol, on which he serves as a judge.

In July 2018, Bryan released a lyric video that includes pictures of his family.

== Commercial performance ==
Sunrise, Sunburn, Sunset reached number one on Country Airplay for chart dated September 15, 2018 where it stayed for two weeks. It also reached number four on the Hot Country Songs for chart dated September 22, 2018. As of October 2018, the song has sold 136,000 copies in the United States. On March 5, 2019, the single was certified gold by the Recording Industry Association of America (RIAA) for sales of over a 500,000 digital copies in the United States.

== Music video ==
The accompanying music video for the song was directed by Joe DeMaio and premiered on CMT, GAC and Vevo in July 2018.

== Charts ==
=== Weekly charts ===
Chart (2018)	Peak position
Canada (Canadian Hot 100)	52
Canada Country (Billboard)	2
US Billboard Hot 100	35
US Country Airplay (Billboard)	1
US Hot Country Songs (Billboard)	4

=== Year-end charts ===
Chart (2018)	Position
US Country Airplay (Billboard)	16
US Hot Country Songs (Billboard)	16
US Radio Songs (Billboard)	61

== Certifications ==
Region	Certification	Certified units/sales
Canada (Music Canada)	Platinum	80,000^{‡}
United States (RIAA)	Platinum	1,000,000^{‡}
^{‡} Sales+streaming figures based on certification alone.
