= Light It Up (Luke Bryan song) =

Single by Luke Bryan

from the album What Makes You Country
- Released: August 23, 2017
- Genre: Country
- Length: 2:58
- Label: Capitol Nashville
- Songwriters: Luke Bryan; Brad Tursi
- Producers: Jeff Stevens; Jody Stevens

Luke Bryan singles chronology
"Fast" (2016)	"Light It Up" (2017)	"Most People Are Good" (2018)

"Light It Up" is a song co-written and recorded by American country music singer Luke Bryan. It was released in August 2017 as the first single from his 2017 album What Makes You Country. Bryan wrote this song with Brad Tursi of the band Old Dominion.

== Content ==
Rolling Stone Country described the song as "a moody production, underpinned by a programmed beat and choppy piano chords, while icy synthesizer fills lifted from Eighties new wave ratchet up the tension." The song is an expression of unrequited love, with the narrator pleading for an unresponsive lover to "light it up", in reference to his cellular phone.

Bryan wrote the song with Brad Tursi of the band Old Dominion, while Jeff Stevens and his son Jody produced it.

== Music video ==
A video directed by Michael Monaco was released on October 26, 2017. It features Jimmy Butler in the lead role, in anticipation of a text as described in the lyrics from his girlfriend played by well known, international, Nashville based model LeeAnna Burton.

== Chart performance ==
For the charts dated September 9, 2017, "Light It Up" debuted at No. 20 on Country Airplay and No. 21 on Hot Country Songs. It sold 18,000 downloads in under two days and debuted at No. 3 on the Country Digital Song Sales chart. The following week it rose to No. 2 on Country Digital Song Sales with 22,000 copies sold on a full week of sales. It also debuted at number 76 on the US Billboard Hot 100 chart for the week of September 16, 2017. The song has sold 164,000 copies in the United States as of January 2018. On September 12, 2025, the single was certified two-times platinum by the Recording Industry Association of America (RIAA) for sales of over two million digital copies in the United States.

== Charts ==
=== Weekly charts ===
Chart (2017–2018)	Peak position
Canada Hot 100 (Billboard)	96
Canada Country (Billboard)	3
US Billboard Hot 100	57
US Country Airplay (Billboard)	1
US Hot Country Songs (Billboard)	4

=== Year-end charts ===
Chart (2017)	Position
US Country Airplay (Billboard)	59
US Hot Country Songs (Billboard)	56

Chart (2018)	Position
US Hot Country Songs (Billboard)	64

== Certifications ==
Region	Certification	Certified units/sales
Canada (Music Canada)	Platinum	80,000^{‡}
United States (RIAA)	2× Platinum	2,000,000^{‡}
^{‡} Sales+streaming figures based on certification alone.
