= Most People Are Good =

Single by Luke Bryan

from the album What Makes You Country
- Released: January 8, 2018
- Genre: Country
- Length: 3:41
- Label: Capitol Nashville
- Songwriters: David Frasier; Ed Hill; Josh Kear
- Producers: Jeff Stevens; Jody Stevens

Luke Bryan singles chronology
"Light It Up" (2017)	"Most People Are Good" (2018)	"Sunrise, Sunburn, Sunset" (2018)

"Most People Are Good" (2018) is a song recorded by American country music singer Luke Bryan from his sixth studio album, What Makes You Country (2017). It was written by David Frasier, Ed Hill, and Josh Kear, and produced by Jeff Stevens and Jody Stevens. "Most People Are Good" was released in January 2018 as the album's second single.

The song topped the US Billboard Country Airplay chart as well as the Canadian Billboard Country chart. It also peaked at number 43 on the US Billboard Hot 100 chart.

== Content ==
In the song, the narrator makes "uplifting" statements about positive content in the world. Bryan said that he was "captivated" the first time he heard the song, and that "It was something that I felt like that people always need to be reassured that there's way more good going on than negative".

According to Bryan, the line "you love who you love" in the chorus was perceived as a support of the gay community. In response to this, Bryan stated that he considered the lyric to have multiple meanings and he did not have an opinion on its intended meaning: "I'm like, 'I'm not saying I'm gonna go fly that flag—but I'm not saying I'm not either.'"

== Critical reception ==
Leeann Ward of Country Universe gave the song an "A" grade, stating that the song "would deserve props based on its pleasant melody and its no frills production alone [...] fortunately, thanks to its thoughtful content, the song is good even beyond the melody and production". Markos Papadatos of Digital Journal gave it an identical rating, stating that "One can really hear Bryan's heart on this song, and it is a great 'pick-me-up' tune."

== Commercial performance ==
The song reached number one on the US Billboard Country Airplay chart for the week of March 31, 2018. It also peaked at number 4 on Hot Country Songs on April 28, 2018. As of August 2018, the song has sold over 309,000 copies in the United States. On March 5, 2019, the single was certified platinum by the Recording Industry Association of America (RIAA) for sales of over a million units in the United States.

== Music video ==
The accompanying music video for the song, directed by Wes Edwards, was released on March 14, 2018. Filmed entirely in one take, it features Bryan singing in front of video screens accompanied by a diverse range of people.

== Charts ==
=== Weekly charts ===
Chart (2018)	Peak position
Canada Hot 100 (Billboard)	70
Canada Country (Billboard)	1
US Billboard Hot 100	43
US Country Airplay (Billboard)	1
US Hot Country Songs (Billboard)	4

=== Year-end charts ===
Chart (2018)	Position
US Country Airplay (Billboard)	10
US Hot Country Songs (Billboard)	11
US Radio Songs (Billboard)	46

== Certifications ==
Region	Certification	Certified units/sales
Canada (Music Canada)	Platinum	80,000^{‡}
United States (RIAA)	2× Platinum	2,000,000^{‡}
^{‡} Sales+streaming figures based on certification alone.
