= Drunk on You =

Single by Luke Bryan

from the album Tailgates & Tanlines
- Released: February 13, 2012
- Recorded: 2011
- Genre: Country
- Length: 3:33
- Label: Capitol Nashville
- Songwriters: Rodney Clawson; Chris Tompkins; Josh Kear
- Producer: Jeff Stevens

Luke Bryan singles chronology
"I Don't Want This Night to End" (2011)	"Drunk on You" (2012)	"Kiss Tomorrow Goodbye" (2012)

"Drunk on You" is a song written by Rodney Clawson, Chris Tompkins, and Josh Kear and recorded by American country music artist Luke Bryan. It was released in February 2012 as the third single from his album Tailgates & Tanlines. It was also the first single that Bryan did not have a hand in writing.

== Critical reception ==
Billy Dukes of Taste of Country gave the song four stars out of five, writing that it is "full of color and landscape that allow a listener to feel what [Bryan is] singing" and "has the potential to age like fine wine." Kevin John Coyne of Country Universe gave the song an A grade, saying that "it doesn't sound like a love scene being forced out into the country for genre purposes, so much as a love scene that just happens to be taking place in the country" while adding that Bryan is "helping [country music] age with dignity and a sense of humor." Matt Bjorke of Roughstock gave the song a mixed review, calling the lyrics "downright cheesy in places" but went on to say that it is "certainly something the college-age fans will downright love and relate to as they live in the moment."

== Music video ==
The music video was directed by Shaun Silva and premiered on March 23, 2012. It is the sequel to his "I Don't Want This Night to End" video, in which Bryan's character secures a ticket for the co-star of the previous installment despite his stage manager (Silva)'s skepticism. Cameron Richardson also returns as Bryan's Long Lost Fling.

== Chart performance ==
"Drunk on You" debuted at number 57 on the U.S. Billboard Hot Country Songs chart for the week of February 25, 2012. The song became Bryan's first Billboard Hot 100 chart top 20 hit when it rose to number 16 for the week of June 16, 2012, and his fifth number-one single on the Hot Country Songs chart for the week of July 7, 2012. The song sold 2,089,000 copies in 2012, the third best-selling country music song of the year. It reached its three million sales mark in the U.S. in May 2015. The song has sold 3,040,000 copies as of August 2015.

== Charts and certifications ==
=== Weekly charts ===
Chart (2012)	Peak position
Canada Hot 100 (Billboard)	28
US Billboard Hot 100	16
US Hot Country Songs (Billboard)	1

=== Year-end charts ===
Chart (2012)	Position
Canada (Canadian Hot 100)	98
US Billboard Hot 100	53
US Country Songs (Billboard)	10

=== Certifications ===
Region	Certification	Certified units/sales
Canada (Music Canada)	2× Platinum	160,000^{*}
United States (RIAA)	7× Platinum	3,040,000
^{*} Sales figures based on certification alone.
