= Fast (Luke Bryan song) =

Single by Luke Bryan

from the album Kill the Lights
- Released: November 28, 2016
- Recorded: 2015
- Genre: Country
- Length: 3:26
- Label: Capitol Nashville
- Songwriter(s): Luke Bryan; Rodney Clawson; Luke Laird
- Producer(s): Jeff Stevens; Jody Stevens

Luke Bryan singles chronology
"Move" (2016)	"Fast" (2016)	"Light It Up" (2017)

"Fast" is a song co-written and recorded by American country music artist Luke Bryan. It was released in November 2016 as the sixth and final single from his 2015 album Kill the Lights.

== Content ==
The song is about "contemplating the speed of life" and noting how events in life move "fast", especially as one ages.

Bryan told Billboard that the song came about during a writing session with Luke Laird and Rodney Clawson. They were having little success with one song idea until Laird provided the word "fast", and the writers came up with the song's first two lines. The verses take place while the male narrator is a teenager and aspiring for things that are "fast", while the chorus shifts to the narrator's adulthood, where he observes that he is frustrated by his inability to "slow down the passage of time" as stated in the lyric "60 seconds now feels more like 30", a lyric provided by Bryan.

The song's recording session includes drums from Greg Morrow overlaid by programmed drum sounds provided by Jody Stevens, along with electric piano from Mike Rojas and "glassy whole notes" from session guitarist J.T. Corenflos.

== Critical reception ==
Taste of Country's review of the song was positive, saying that "Rodney Clawson and Luke Laird lend a hand with lyrics that are sure to compel men to hold their women tight as he’s singing it live in 2017." In April 2017, the song became Bryan's fifteenth consecutive number one hit.

== Music video ==
The official music video for "Fast" was directed by Michael Monaco and premiered March 2, 2017. The "nostalgic" video features Bryan playing guitar on an empty stage, interspersed with personal photos that chronicle his career and family life.

== Chart performance ==
The song reached the No. 1 position on Country Airplay, making Bryan the first artist to have six No. 1 Country Airplay singles from an album. The song has sold 172,000 copies in the United States as of May 2017.

== Charts ==
=== Weekly charts ===
Chart (2016–2017)	Peak position
Canada (Canadian Hot 100)	91
Canada Country (Billboard)	1
US Billboard Hot 100	58
US Country Airplay (Billboard)	1
US Hot Country Songs (Billboard)	5

=== Year-end charts ===
Chart (2017)	Position
Canada Country (Billboard)	13
US Country Airplay (Billboard)	26
US Hot Country Songs (Billboard)	35
US Radio Songs (Billboard)	72

== Certifications ==
Region	Certification	Certified units/sales
United States (RIAA)	Platinum	1,000,000^{‡}
^{‡} Sales+streaming figures based on certification alone.
