= Kiss Tomorrow Goodbye (song) =

Single by Luke Bryan

from the album Tailgates & Tanlines
- Released: August 6, 2012
- Recorded: 2011
- Genre: Country
- Length: 3:23
- Label: Capitol Nashville
- Songwriters: Luke Bryan; Jeff Stevens; Shane McAnally
- Producer: Jeff Stevens

Luke Bryan singles chronology
"Drunk on You" (2012)	"Kiss Tomorrow Goodbye" (2012)	"The Only Way I Know" (2012)

"Kiss Tomorrow Goodbye" is a song co-written and recorded by American country music artist Luke Bryan. It was released in August 2012 as the fourth and final single from his album Tailgates & Tanlines. The song was written by Bryan, Jeff Stevens and Shane McAnally.

== Content ==
The song is set in the key of F minor with a chord pattern of D♭-Fm-E♭. It is about a couple who have decided to break up because the only thing they can get right is making love and they decide to "do what [they] do best" one last time before breaking up. Co-writer and record producer Jeff Stevens told Taste of Country that he came up with the title while playing his guitar, but did not finalize the song until he presented the idea to Bryan and co-writer Shane McAnally.

== Critical reception ==
Billy Dukes of Taste of Country gave the song three stars out of five, writing that "it’s got a great hook, and a quirky, memorable lyric but after back-to-back number one hits of a similar groove, it’s wearing a little thin." Ben Foster of Country Universe gave the song a C+ grade, saying that it "could have been good, but this endlessly distracting wall of noise doesn’t let it come anywhere close to its potential." Matt Bjorke of Roughstock gave the song a favorable review, writing that "Luke sings this one well and with the tasty melody accompaniment, it’s a memorable radio song."

== Music video ==
The music video was directed by Shaun Silva and premiered in October 2012.

== Chart performance ==
"Kiss Tomorrow Goodbye" debuted at number 55 on the U.S. Billboard Hot Country Songs chart for the week of July 28, 2012. It also debuted at number 92 on the U.S. Billboard Hot 100 chart for the week of September 8, 2012. It also debuted at number 91 on the Canadian Hot 100 chart for the week of September 8, 2012.

== Charts and certifications ==
=== Weekly charts ===
Chart (2012–2013)	Peak position
Canada Hot 100 (Billboard)	46
Canada Country (Billboard)	1
US Billboard Hot 100	29
US Hot Country Songs (Billboard)	3
US Country Airplay (Billboard)	1

=== Year-end charts ===
Chart (2012)	Position
US Hot Country Songs (Billboard)	48

Chart (2013)	Position
US Country Airplay (Billboard)	87
US Hot Country Songs (Billboard)	60

=== Certifications ===
Region	Certification	Certified units/sales
Canada (Music Canada)	Gold	40,000^{*}
United States (RIAA)	4× Platinum	4,000,000^{‡}
^{*} Sales figures based on certification alone.^{‡} Sales+streaming figures based on certification alone.
