= Huntin', Fishin' and Lovin' Every Day =

Single by Luke Bryan

from the album Kill the Lights
- Released: March 14, 2016
- Recorded: 2015
- Genre: Country
- Length: 4:38 (album version); 4:25 (single version); 2:55 (radio edit)
- Label: Capitol Nashville
- Songwriters: Luke Bryan; Dallas Davidson; Rhett Akins; Ben Hayslip
- Producers: Jeff Stevens; Jody Stevens

Luke Bryan singles chronology
"Home Alone Tonight" (2015)	"Huntin', Fishin' and Lovin' Every Day" (2016)	"Move" (2016)

Music video
- "Huntin', Fishin', and Lovin' Every Day" on YouTube

"Huntin', Fishin' and Lovin' Every Day" is a song co-written and recorded by American country music artist Luke Bryan for his fifth studio album, Kill the Lights (2015). It was released to American country radio on March 14, 2016 as the album's fourth official single. The song is about the rural Georgia lifestyle that Bryan lives in.

"Huntin', Fishin' and Lovin' Every Day" reached number one on the Billboard Country Airplay chart, giving Bryan his fourteenth number-one hit on that chart. It also peaked at number two on the Hot Country Songs chart and number 37 on the Hot 100, his fourteenth top 40 hit on that chart. It was certified Platinum by the Recording Industry Association of America (RIAA), denoting sales of over a million digital units in the United States. The song also garnered chart success in Canada, giving Bryan his ninth number-one hit on the Canada Country chart and reaching number 51 on the Canadian Hot 100. It also received a Gold certification from Music Canada, denoting sales of 40,000 units in that country.

The accompanying music video for the song was directed by Michael Monaco and Hunter Jobes.

== Content ==
Bryan wrote the song with the songwriting team The Peach Pickers (Rhett Akins, Dallas Davidson, and Ben Hayslip). He wrote it with them during a 2014 tour, after having saved the title phrase to his phone. Thematically, the song is about a rural lifestyle in Bryan's and the Peach Pickers' home state of Georgia. Included are an "out of phase" guitar solo from J. T. Corenflos, a banjo line played by Ilya Toshinsky, and drum fills by Greg Morrow. The song is in a moderate tempo and 2/2 time signature, in G mixolydian with a main chord pattern of G-F/G-C/G-G. Bryan's vocals range from B_{3} to E_{5}.

== Critical reception ==
A review from Taste of Country was favorable, saying that "The singer’s simple message will further endear him to the fans who already buy his albums, scream the words to every song at concerts and hunt in his brand of camouflage. He’s a master at giving his audience the music they want, but in this case he also pays homage to a classic sound that...is making a comeback. 'Huntin’ and Fishin’ and Lovin’ Every Day' [sic] is filled with details that feel specific to Bryan’s life or raising."

== Music video ==
The music video was directed by Michael Monaco and Hunter Jobes and premiered in April 2016.

== Commercial reception ==
The song first entered the Hot Country Songs chart at number 38 in August 2015 when it was released as a teaser before the release of the album Kill the Lights, selling 10,000 copies in its first week. It entered the Country Airplay chart at number 33 when it was officially released as a single in March 2016. Luke Bryan performed the song at the 51st ACM Awards, which pushed the song up to number 66 on the Billboard Hot 100 chart. with 26,000 copies sold for the week. The song has sold 504,000 copies in the US as of November 2016.

== In popular culture ==
The original producers of the Big Mouth Billy Bass singing fish, Gemmy Industries, released a remake of the original Big Mouth Billy Bass in 2021. This new version cut "Don't Worry Be Happy" by Bobby McFerrin for Bryan's "Huntin', Fishin' and Lovin' Every Day" in addition to the Talking Heads iteration of "Take Me to the River".

== Chart performance ==
=== Weekly charts ===
Chart (2016)	Peak position
Canada Hot 100 (Billboard)	51
Canada Country (Billboard)	1
US Billboard Hot 100	37
US Country Airplay (Billboard)	1
US Hot Country Songs (Billboard)	2

=== Year end charts ===
Chart (2016)	Position
US Country Airplay (Billboard)	24
US Hot Country Songs (Billboard)	11

== Certifications ==
Region	Certification	Certified units/sales
Canada (Music Canada)	Platinum	80,000^{‡}
United States (RIAA)	4× Platinum	504,000
^{‡} Sales+streaming figures based on certification alone.

== See also ==
- List of number-one country singles of 2016 (Canada)
- List of number-one country singles of 2016 (U.S.)
