= Strip It Down =

Single by Luke Bryan

from the album Kill the Lights
- Released: August 4, 2015
- Recorded: 2015
- Genre: Country
- Length: 4:01
- Label: Capitol Nashville
- Songwriters: Luke Bryan; Jon Nite; Ross Copperman
- Producers: Jeff Stevens; Jody Stevens

Luke Bryan singles chronology
"Kick the Dust Up" (2015)	"Strip It Down" (2015)	"Home Alone Tonight" (2015)

"Strip It Down" is a song co-written and recorded by American country music artist Luke Bryan. It was first released to digital retailers as the first promotional single from his fifth studio album, Kill the Lights (2015), on July 17, 2015 and was released to radio on August 4, 2015 as the album's second official single. The song was written by Bryan, Jon Nite and Ross Copperman, and produced by Jeff and Jody Stevens.

== Critical reception ==
Leeann Ward, reviewing the song for Country Universe, gave the song a D+ grade, saying that it "is just another in a long string of his own singles that has been stripped of any country elements. The only aspects of the song that keep it from being a straight up pop single is its arbitrary reference to cowboy boots and that Bryan’s interesting but thin voice has more nasal than a typical pop singer’s voice."

Website Taste of Country was more favorable, saying, "'Kick the Dust Up' was a new take on a well-tested sound for Bryan. More of the same from this new album would have signaled a career on a plateau. 'Strip It Down' ensures this two-time Entertainer of the Year’s career remains on the rise."

== Commercial performance ==
Based on pre-order downloads for Kill The Lights in advance of the album's release, the song debuted at number 19 on the Hot Country Songs chart, number 81 on the Billboard Hot 100 chart, and at number 5 on the Country Digital Songs chart, selling 44,000 copies. The song has sold 779,000 copies in the US as of February 2016. It was certified four-times Platinum by the RIAA in February 2025, indicating US sales of over 4,000,000.

== Music video ==
A lyric video for the song was uploaded to Bryan's Vevo account on July 17, 2015 in conjunction with the song's digital debut. The music video was directed by Shaun Silva and premiered in October 2015.

The lyric video features various couples making love with each other on a smoky grey background as the lyrics appear on the screen in black (and white) blood-like writing.

The music video begins as a city man and a farmer, by phone, agree to meet up. At a gas station, both men trade keys for their vehicles, a luxury sedan and a pickup truck, and set off in opposite directions. Meanwhile, two women, Abbi and Malone, come home to find letters and shoes. After reading the letters, both women dress up, Malone dressing up in jeans and wearing her boots, while Abbi dons a dress and begins wearing her tip toe shoes. After both men pick up the women, both couples enjoy their romantic evening, the version of it depending on the setting.

== Chart performance ==
=== Weekly charts ===
Chart (2015–2016)	Peak position
Canada Hot 100 (Billboard)	48
Canada Country (Billboard)	1
US Billboard Hot 100	30
US Hot Country Songs (Billboard)	1
US Country Airplay (Billboard)	1

=== Year-end charts ===
Chart (2015)	Position
US Country Airplay (Billboard)	51
US Hot Country Songs (Billboard)	12
Chart (2016)	Position
US Hot Country Songs (Billboard)	79

=== Certifications ===
Region	Certification	Certified units/sales
Canada (Music Canada)	Gold	40,000^{*}
United States (RIAA)	4× Platinum	4,000,000^{‡}
^{*} Sales figures based on certification alone.^{‡} Sales+streaming figures based on certification alone.
