= Country Girl (Shake It for Me) =

Single by Luke Bryan

from the album Tailgates & Tanlines
- Released: March 14, 2011
- Recorded: 2010–11
- Genre: Country rock
- Length: 3:45
- Label: Capitol Nashville
- Songwriters: Luke Bryan; Dallas Davidson
- Producers: Jeff Stevens; Mark Bright

Luke Bryan singles chronology
"Someone Else Calling You Baby" (2010)	"Country Girl (Shake It for Me)" (2011)	"I Don't Want This Night to End" (2011)

"Country Girl (Shake It for Me)" is a song co-written and recorded by American country music artist Luke Bryan. It was released in March 2011 as the first single from his album Tailgates & Tanlines. Upon being released, it debuted at number 52 on the Billboard Hot Country Songs chart for the week of April 2, 2011. The song was written by Bryan and Dallas Davidson. As of April 2014, it is the third best-selling song by a male country music solo artist.

== Background and writing ==
"Country Girl" is a song about "a country girl getting up there getting a little wild", according to co-writer Dallas Davidson. Bryan said that he and Davidson came up with the idea after listening to hip-hop songs, when Bryan began playing a "groove". He then told Davidson that the country genre needed more songs about "country girls shaking it a little bit". Davidson said that he and Bryan were initially "suspicious" about the song's prospects as a hit, since it sounded so different from "Rain Is a Good Thing", which Davidson also co-wrote. After he found that he got a positive reaction from playing it in concert, Bryan then decided to release it as a single.

== Song structure ==
The song is set in E dorian (i.e., an E minor scale with the sixth tone raised by a semitone), with open fifths in the accompaniment instead of chords, forming a pattern of E5-G5-D5-E5 twice in the verses. The chorus uses this pattern twice, and then follows it with a pattern of E5-G5-A5-E5-D5-A5-E5-G5-A5-E5 as Bryan sings "Country girl, shake it for me, girl, shake it for me, girl, shake it for me." Clare Dunn sings backing vocals.

== Critical reception ==
Matt Bjorke of Roughstock gave the song a four-star rating and calling it a "ditty" but saying "the song screams hit" and calling it "downright charming." Kevin John Coyne of Country Universe gave it a B grade, saying that Jason Aldean would have been too aggressive in this song, but Bryan "melts away its sexist edge by layering it with goofiness and playful energy", calling it a "shamelessly catchy ditty."

== Commercial performance ==
The song was released for sales digital six weeks after the song was released to radio. It debuted on the Billboard Hot 100 chart at number 22, the highest debut of the week with 105,000 copies sold. The song reached its 3 million sales mark in the United States by April 2014, making it then the third best-selling song by a male country music solo artist. As of August 2017, the song has sold 3,660,000 copies in the US. In 2026, it was certified Diamond.

== Music video ==
The music video was directed by Shaun Silva and premiered in May 2011. It was filmed in Los Angeles at Siren Studios. The video tells a story of a small-town girl coming to L.A. to audition and beat out all the big-city dancers. The ladies are shown practicing how to dance in boots.

== Charts and certifications ==
=== Weekly charts ===
Chart (2011)	Peak position
Canada Hot 100 (Billboard)	50
Canada Country (Billboard)	10
US Billboard Hot 100	22
US Hot Country Songs (Billboard)	4
US Country Digital Songs (Billboard)	1

=== Year-end charts ===
Chart (2011)	Position
US Country Songs (Billboard)	16
US Billboard Hot 100	81

=== Certifications ===
Region	Certification	Certified units/sales
Canada (Music Canada)	2× Platinum	160,000^{*}
New Zealand (RMNZ)	2× Platinum	60,000^{‡}
United Kingdom (BPI)	Gold	400,000^{‡}
United States (RIAA)	Diamond	3,660,000
^{*} Sales figures based on certification alone.^{‡} Sales+streaming figures based on certification alone.
