= Move (Luke Bryan song) =

Single by Luke Bryan

from the album Kill the Lights
- Released: July 25, 2016
- Recorded: 2015
- Genre: Country rock
- Length: 3:47
- Label: Capitol Nashville
- Songwriters: Luke Bryan; Michael Carter; Jay Clementi
- Producers: Jeff Stevens; Jody Stevens

Luke Bryan singles chronology
"Huntin', Fishin' and Lovin' Every Day" (2016)	"Move" (2016)	"Fast" (2016)

"Move" is a song co-written and recorded by American country music artist Luke Bryan. It was released to American country radio on July 25, 2016 as the fifth official single from his 2015 album Kill the Lights. Bryan wrote this song with Michael Carter and Jay Clementi.

== Content ==
"Move" is a moderate uptempo tune that is about a Northern girl who has moved to the South, where she has "got in with some Southern belles" and her moves have become even more attractive.

== Commercial performance ==
The song debuted at number 43 on the US Billboard Hot Country Songs chart at number 43 in August 2015 and became available for download with the release of the album Kill the Lights, selling 8,000 copies in its first week. It re-entered the chart at number 42 nearly a year later after being released as a single. The song has sold 254,000 copies in the US as of January 2017.

== Music video ==
The music video was directed by Shane Drake and premiered in September 2016. The video features Luke performing in a club with his band and a female dancer dancing next door. The dancer then breaks through the wall at the final chorus and dances on stage with Luke and the band. Luke is dressed in a baseball cap and T-shirt for the duration of the video, until the final scene when he is dancing with the girl, in which he wears a black suit and white undershirt.

== Chart performance ==
=== Weekly charts ===
Chart (2016)	Peak position
Canada (Canadian Hot 100)	78
Canada Country (Billboard)	1
US Billboard Hot 100	50
US Country Airplay (Billboard)	1
US Hot Country Songs (Billboard)	5

=== Year end charts ===
Chart (2016)	Position
US Country Airplay (Billboard)	25
US Hot Country Songs (Billboard)	44

== Certifications ==
Region	Certification	Certified units/sales
Canada (Music Canada)	Gold	40,000^{‡}
United States (RIAA)	Platinum	1,000,000^{‡}
^{‡} Sales+streaming figures based on certification alone.
