= Home Alone Tonight =

Single by Luke Bryan featuring Karen Fairchild

from the album Kill the Lights
- Released: November 23, 2015
- Recorded: 2015
- Genre: Country pop; country rock
- Length: 3:10
- Label: Capitol Nashville
- Songwriters: Jody Stevens; Cole Taylor; Jaida Dreyer; Tommy Cecil
- Producers: Jeff Stevens; Jody Stevens

Luke Bryan singles chronology
"Strip It Down" (2015)	"Home Alone Tonight" (2015)	"Huntin', Fishin' and Lovin' Every Day" (2016)

Karen Fairchild singles chronology
"A Ride Back Home" (2009)	"Home Alone Tonight" (2015)

"Home Alone Tonight" is a song recorded by American country music artist Luke Bryan as a duet with Karen Fairchild of Little Big Town. It was recorded for his fifth studio album, Kill the Lights (2015). Upon the release of the album, the song entered the Billboard Hot Country Songs chart at number 33 on the strength of digital downloads. It was serviced to American country radio on November 23, 2015 as the album's third official single. The song was written by Jody Stevens, Cole Taylor, Jaida Dreyer and Tommy Cecil.

== Live performances ==
Bryan and Fairchild performed the song live at the 2015 American Music Awards.

== Content ==
The song is a mid-tempo ballad in which a man and woman meet in a bar and plot revenge on their former lovers together.

== Critical reception ==
An uncredited review from Taste of Country was favorable, stating that it "features more progressive production than 'Strip It Down,' but isn’t quite as edgy as 'Kick the Dust Up.' One would hardly call the arrangement organic, but that fits the mood. The two spontaneous lovers promise they won’t regret what’s to come, even though both know it’s not true. It’s an inevitability that many will relate to."

== Commercial performance ==
The song debuted at number 33 on the Billboard Hot Country Songs chart dated of August 29, 2015, the week the album was released, selling 13,000 copies in its first week. It debuted at number 55 on the Country Airplay chart dated of November 14, 2015 in anticipation of its official release. After Bryan and Fairchild performed the song on the 2015 American Music Awards, it debuted at number 97 on the Billboard Hot 100 chart dated of December 12, 2015, selling 16,000 copies. It became Bryan's thirteenth consecutive (and fifteenth overall) number one country music single on the Country Airplay chart dated of February 13, 2016. The song has sold 441,000 copies in the US as of April 2016.

== Charts ==
=== Weekly charts ===
Chart (2015–2016)	Peak position
Canada Hot 100 (Billboard)	55
Canada Country (Billboard)	1
US Billboard Hot 100	38
US Country Airplay (Billboard)	1
US Hot Country Songs (Billboard)	3

=== Year end charts ===
Chart (2016)	Position
US Country Airplay (Billboard)	27
US Hot Country Songs (Billboard)	21

== Certifications ==
Region	Certification	Certified units/sales
Canada (Music Canada)	Gold	40,000^{*}
United States (RIAA)	Platinum	1,000,000^{‡}
^{*} Sales figures based on certification alone.^{‡} Sales+streaming figures based on certification alone.
