= That's My Kind of Night Tour =

2014–15 concert tour by Luke Bryan

- Tour by Luke Bryan
- Promotional poster for the 2015 leg of the tour
- Associated album: Crash My Party
- Start date: January 16, 2014
- End date: May 7, 2015
- Legs: 5
- No. of shows: 89
- Box office: $59,523,143

Luke Bryan concert chronology
- Dirt Road Diaries Tour (2013); That's My Kind of Night Tour (2014–15); Kick the Dust Up Tour (2015)

The That's My Kind of Night Tour was the second headlining concert tour by American country music artist Luke Bryan, in support of his fourth studio album Crash My Party (2013). It began on January 8, 2014 in Columbus, Ohio and finished on May 7, 2015 in Winnipeg, Manitoba. The tour is sponsored by Miller Lite, Texaco, and Cabela's.

== Concert synopsis ==
At Stadiums and arenas the show begins with Bryan standing on a black truck with flames surrounding him while singing his hit "That's My Kind of Night".

== Setlists ==
North America Leg 1
1. "That's My Kind of Night"
2. "Rain Is a Good Thing"
3. "Kiss Tomorrow Goodbye"
4. "All My Friends Say"
5. "Country Man"
6. "Someone Else Calling You Baby"
7. "Do I"
8. "Play It Again"
9. "Muckalee Creek Water"/"Drinkin' Beer and Wastin' Bullets"
10. "Suntan City"
11. "If You Ain't Here to Party"
12. "Can't Hold Us" (Macklemore & Ryan Lewis cover)
13. "Crash My Party"
14. "Drink a Beer"
15. "Drunk on You"
16. "I Don't Want This Night to End" (mashed up with Taio Cruz's "Dynamite")

Encore

17. "The Only Way I Know"
18. "Country Girl (Shake It for Me)"
North America Legs 2 & 3
1. "That's My Kind of Night"
2. "Rain Is a Good Thing"
3. "Kiss Tomorrow Goodbye"
4. "All My Friends Say"
5. "Roller Coaster"
6. "Country Man"
7. "Someone Else Calling You Baby"
8. "Crazy Girl" (Eli Young Band cover) (with Lee Brice)
9. "Shut It Down"
10. "Do I"
11. "This Is How We Roll" (with Cole Swindell)
12. "Suntan City"
13. "Crash My Party"
14. "Drink a Beer"
15. "Drunk on You"
16. "I Don't Want This Night to End" (mashed up with Taio Cruz's "Dynamite")

Encore

18. "Play it Again"
19. "Country Girl (Shake It for Me)"
Lincoln Financial Field
1. "That's My Kind of Night"
2. "Rain Is a Good Thing"
3. "Kiss Tomorrow Goodbye"
4. "All My Friends Say"
5. "Roller Coaster"
6. "Country Man"
7. "Someone Else Calling You Baby"
8. "Crazy Girl" (Eli Young Band cover) (with Lee Brice)
9. "Shut It Down"
10. "Do I"
11. "This Is How We Roll" (with Cole Swindell)
12. "Dirt Road Anthem" (cover) (with Brantley Gilbert)
13. "Suntan City"
14. "Crash My Party"
15. "Drink a Beer"
16. "Drunk on You"
17. "I Don't Want This Night to End" (mashed up with Taio Cruz's "Dynamite")

Encore

18. "Play It Again"
19. "Country Girl (Shake It for Me)"
Gillette Stadium
1. "That's My Kind of Night"
2. "Rain Is a Good Thing"
3. "Kiss Tomorrow Goodbye"
4. "All My Friends Say"
5. "Roller Coaster"
6. "Country Man"
7. "Someone Else Calling You Baby"
8. "Crazy Girl" (Eli Young Band cover) (with Lee Brice)
9. "Shut It Down"
10. "This Is How We Roll" (with Cole Swindell)
11. "The Only Way I Know"
12. "Suntan City"
13. "How Am I Doin" (with Dierks Bentley)
14. "Crash My Party"
15. "Drink a Beer"
16. "Drunk on You"
17. "I Don't Want This Night to End" (mashed up with Taio Cruz's "Dynamite")

Encore

18. "Play It Again"
19. "Country Girl (Shake It for Me)"
Soldier Field & Heinz Field
1. "That's My Kind of Night"
2. "Rain Is a Good Thing"
3. "Kiss Tomorrow Goodbye"
4. "All My Friends Say"
5. "Roller Coaster"
6. "Country Man"
7. "Someone Else Calling You Baby"
8. "Crazy Girl" (Eli Young Band cover) (with Lee Brice)
9. "Shut It Down"
10. "This Is How We Roll"(with Cole Swindell)
11. "Dust On The Battle" (David Lee Murphy cover) (with Dierks Bentley & David Lee Murphy)
12. "Fishin In The Dark" (The Nitty Gritty Dirt Band cover)
13. "Suntan City"
14. "Crash My Party"
15. "Drink a Beer"
16. "Drunk on You"
17. "I Don't Want This Night to End" (mashed up with Taio Cruz's "Dynamite")

Encore

18. "Play It Again"
19. "Country Girl (Shake It for Me)"
North America Leg 4
1. "Kick the Dust Up"
2. "All My Friends Say"
3. "Kiss Tomorrow Goodbye"
4. "Roller Coaster"
5. "Play It Again"
6. "Crash My Party"
7. "Games"
8. "Someone Else Calling You Baby"
9. "This Is How We Roll"
10. "Do I"
11. "Drink a Beer"
12. "Drunk on You"
13. "Rain Is a Good Thing"
14. "I See You"
15. "I Don't Want This Night to End"

Encore

16. "That's My Kind of Night"
17. "Country Girl (Shake It For Me)"

== Tour dates ==
Date	City	Country	Venue	Opening act	Attendance	Gross revenue
North America Leg 1
January 16, 2014	Columbus	United States	Schottenstein Center	Lee Brice; Cole Swindell	13,178 / 13,178	$682,812
January 18, 2014	Knoxville	United States	Thompson–Boling Arena	Lee Brice; Cole Swindell	14,289 / 15,501	$748,048
January 23, 2014	Uncasville	United States	Mohegan Sun Arena	Lee Brice; Cole Swindell	13,484 / 14,383	$1,293,069
January 24, 2014	Uncasville	United States	Mohegan Sun Arena	Lee Brice; Cole Swindell	13,484 / 14,383	$1,293,069
January 25, 2014	New York City	United States	Madison Square Garden	Lee Brice; Cole Swindell	14,600 / 14,600	
January 30, 2014	Lubbock	United States	United Spirit Arena	Lee Brice; Cole Swindell	9,948 / 9,948	
January 31, 2014	Oklahoma City	United States	Chesapeake Energy Arena	Lee Brice; Cole Swindell	11,891 / 11,891	$574,233
February 6, 2014	Moline	United States	IWireless Center	Lee Brice; Cole Swindell	10,330 / 10,330	$542,300
February 7, 2014	Cedar Falls	United States	UNI-Dome	Lee Brice; Cole Swindell	—N/a	—N/a
February 8, 2014	Omaha	United States	CenturyLink Center Omaha	Lee Brice; Cole Swindell	11,891 / 11,891	$723,925
February 14, 2014	Wilkes-Barre	United States	Mohegan Sun Arena at Casey Plaza	Lee Brice; Cole Swindell	7,978 / 7,978	$437,872
February 15, 2014	Atlantic City	United States	Boardwalk Hall	Lee Brice; Cole Swindell	12,143 / 12,143	$689,104
February 17, 2014	Greensboro*	United States	Greensboro Coliseum	Lee Brice	13,345 / 13,345	$752,573
February 21, 2014	Lexington*	United States	Rupp Arena	Lee Brice; Cole Swindell	18,276 / 18,276	$742,539
February 28, 2014	Fargo	United States	Fargodome	Lee Brice; Cole Swindell	19,418 / 19,418	$1,034,228
March 1, 2014	Bismarck	United States	Bismarck Civic Center	Lee Brice; Cole Swindell	6,533 / 6,533	$362,190
March 2, 2014	Saint Paul	United States	Xcel Energy Center	Lee Brice; Cole Swindell	14,740 / 14,740	$825,915
March 7, 2014	Memphis	United States	FedExForum	Lee Brice; Cole Swindell	13,272 / 13,272	$665,058
March 8, 2014	Bossier City	United States	CenturyLink Center	Lee Brice; Cole Swindell	12,292 / 12,292	$678,063
North America Leg 2
May 3, 2014	Vancouver	Canada	Rogers Arena	Lee Brice; Cole Swindell	14,139 / 14,139	$675,195
May 4, 2014	Kelowna	Canada	Prospera Place	Lee Brice; Cole Swindell	5,344 / 5,344	$366,358
May 6, 2014	Dawson Creek	Canada	EnCana Events Centre	Lee Brice; Cole Swindell	8,785 / 8,785	$577,378
May 7, 2014	Dawson Creek	Canada	EnCana Events Centre	Lee Brice; Cole Swindell	8,785 / 8,785	$577,378
May 9, 2014	Calgary	Canada	Scotiabank Saddledome	Lee Brice; Cole Swindell	12,634 / 12,634	$624,498
May 10, 2014	Edmonton	Canada	Rexall Place	Lee Brice; Cole Swindell	—N/a	—N/a
May 12, 2014	Edmonton	Canada	Rexall Place	Lee Brice; Cole Swindell	—N/a	—N/a
May 29, 2014	Charlotte	United States	PNC Music Pavilion	Lee Brice; Cole Swindell	18,286 / 18,286	$661,344
May 30, 2014	Bristow	United States	Jiffy Lube Live	Lee Brice; Cole Swindell	42,709 / 42,709	$1,606,434
May 31, 2014	Bristow	United States	Jiffy Lube Live	Lee Brice; Cole Swindell	42,709 / 42,709	$1,606,434
June 1, 2014	Holmdel	United States	PNC Bank Arts Center	Lee Brice; Cole Swindell	16,618 / 16,618	$750,662
June 6, 2014	Virginia Beach	United States	Farm Bureau Live	Lee Brice; Cole Swindell	19,198 / 19,198	$657,492
June 7, 2014	Raleigh	United States	Walnut Creek Amphitheatre	Lee Brice; Cole Swindell	38,938 / 38,938	$1,326,559
June 8, 2014	Raleigh	United States	Walnut Creek Amphitheatre	Lee Brice; Cole Swindell	38,938 / 38,938	$1,326,559
June 12, 2014	Maryland Heights	United States	Verizon Wireless Amphitheater	Lee Brice; Cole Swindell	38,709 / 38,709	$1,361,831
June 13, 2014	Maryland Heights	United States	Verizon Wireless Amphitheater	Lee Brice; Cole Swindell	38,709 / 38,709	$1,361,831
June 18, 2014	Clarkston	United States	DTE Energy Music Theatre	Lee Brice; Cole Swindell	—N/a	—N/a
June 19, 2014	Clarkston	United States	DTE Energy Music Theatre	Lee Brice; Cole Swindell	—N/a	—N/a
June 21, 2014	Pittsburgh	United States	Heinz Field	Dierks Bentley; Lee Brice; Cole Swindell; DJ Rock	52,621 / 52,621	$3,173,249
June 28, 2014	Milwaukee	United States	Marcus Amphitheater	—N/a	21,158 / 22,861	$1,044,470
July 18, 2014 ^{[A]}	Monticello	United States	Great Jones Fair	—N/a	11,429 / 11,429	$798,885
July 23, 2014	Pelham	United States	Oak Mountain Amphitheatre	Lee Brice; Cole Swindell	20,580 / 20,580	$887,036
July 24, 2014	Pelham	United States	Oak Mountain Amphitheatre	Lee Brice; Cole Swindell	20,580 / 20,580	$887,036
July 25, 2014	Atlanta	United States	Aaron's Amphitheatre	Lee Brice; Cole Swindell	37,803 / 37,803	$1,295,732
July 26, 2014	Atlanta	United States	Aaron's Amphitheatre	Lee Brice; Cole Swindell	37,803 / 37,803	$1,295,732
August 1, 2014	Hopewell	United States	CMAC	Lee Brice; Cole Swindell	14,906 / 14,906	$698,340
August 10, 2014	Foxborough	United States	Gillette Stadium	Dierks Bentley; Lee Brice; Cole Swindell; DJ Rock	56,048 / 56,048	$4,349,568
August 15, 2014	Philadelphia	United States	Lincoln Financial Field	Brantley Gilbert; Lee Brice; Cole Swindell; DJ Rock	48,576 / 48,576	$3,896,840
August 16, 2014	Darien	United States	Darien Lake Performing Arts Center	Lee Brice, Cole Swindell	21,482 / 21,482	$790,396
August 17, 2014	Saratoga Springs	United States	Saratoga Performing Arts Center	Lee Brice, Cole Swindell	24,634 / 24,634	$887,625
August 21, 2014	Cuyahoga Falls	United States	Blossom Music Center	Lee Brice, Cole Swindell	40,846 / 40,846	$1,456,937
August 22, 2014	Cuyahoga Falls	United States	Blossom Music Center	Lee Brice, Cole Swindell	40,846 / 40,846	$1,456,937
August 23, 2014	Cincinnati	United States	Riverbend Music Center	Lee Brice, Cole Swindell	—N/a	—N/a
August 24, 2014	Cincinnati	United States	Riverbend Music Center	Lee Brice, Cole Swindell	—N/a	—N/a
August 29, 2014	Noblesville	United States	Klipsch Music Center	Lee Brice, Cole Swindell	49,428 / 49,428	$1,549,389
August 30, 2014	Noblesville	United States	Klipsch Music Center	Lee Brice, Cole Swindell	49,428 / 49,428	$1,549,389
August 31, 2014	Chicago	United States	Soldier Field	Dierks Bentley; Lee Brice; Cole Swindell; DJ Rock	50,529 / 50,529	$3,754,362
September 11, 2014	Manchester	United States	Verizon Wireless Arena	Lee Brice; Cole Swindell	9,059 / 9,059	$498,248
September 12, 2014	New York City	United States	Madison Square Garden	Lee Brice; Cole Swindell	14,655 / 14,655	$1,029,052
September 13, 2014	Hartford	United States	Xfinity Theatre	Lee Brice; Cole Swindell	24,306 / 24,306	
September 14, 2014	Brooklyn	United States	Barclays Center	Lee Brice; Cole Swindell	13,528 / 13,528	$952,378
September 18, 2014	San Antonio	United States	AT&T Center	Lee Brice; Cole Swindell	14,572 / 14,572	$739,925
September 19, 2014	The Woodlands	United States	Cynthia Woods Mitchell Pavilion	Lee Brice; Cole Swindell	16,338 / 16,338	$641,000
September 20, 2014	Dallas	United States	Gexa Energy Pavilion	Lee Brice; Cole Swindell	20,139 / 20,139	$699,689
September 25, 2014	Tampa	United States	MidFlorida Credit Union Amphitheatre	Lee Brice; Cole Swindell	36,179 / 36,179	$1,457,547
September 26, 2014	Tampa	United States	MidFlorida Credit Union Amphitheatre	Lee Brice; Cole Swindell	36,179 / 36,179	$1,457,547
September 27, 2014	West Palm Beach	United States	Cruzan Amphitheatre	Lee Brice; Cole Swindell	19,454 / 19,454	$682,387
October 16, 2014	Sacramento	United States	Sacramento Valley Amphitheater	Lee Brice; Cole Swindell	—N/a	—N/a
October 17, 2014	Concord	United States	Concord Pavilion	Lee Brice; Cole Swindell	13,685 / 13,685	$615,944
October 18, 2014	Mountain View	United States	Shoreline Amphitheatre	Lee Brice; Cole Swindell	22,021 / 22,021	$747,531
October 23, 2014	Phoenix	United States	Ak-Chin Pavilion	Lee Brice; Cole Swindell	20,174 / 20,174	$751,053
October 24, 2014	Chula Vista	United States	Sleep Train Amphitheatre	Lee Brice; Cole Swindell	19,639 / 19,639	$793,773
October 25, 2014	Los Angeles	United States	Hollywood Bowl	Lee Brice; Cole Swindell	17,461 / 17,461	$1,143,528
October 26, 2014	Inglewood	United States	The Forum	Lee Brice; Cole Swindell	12,247 / 12,247	$814,109
North America Leg 3
February 10, 2015	Grand Rapids	United States	Van Andel Arena	Randy Houser; Dustin Lynch	10,841 / 10,841	$692,675
February 11, 2015	Evansville	United States	Ford Center	Randy Houser; Dustin Lynch	8,959 / 8,959	$562,313
February 12, 2015	Louisville	United States	KFC Yum! Center	Randy Houser; Dustin Lynch	15,783 / 15,783	$935,310
February 18, 2015	Estero	United States	Germain Arena	Randy Houser; Dustin Lynch	6,092 / 6,092	$412,733
February 19, 2015	Orlando	United States	Amway Center	Randy Houser; Dustin Lynch	22,467 / 24,013	$1,411,442
February 21, 2015	Orlando	United States	Amway Center	Randy Houser; Dustin Lynch	22,467 / 24,013	$1,411,442
Europe
February 28, 2015	Stockholm	Sweden	Ericsson Globe	—N/a	—N/a	—N/a
March 1, 2015	Oslo	Norway	Oslo Spektrum	—N/a	—N/a	—N/a
March 3, 2015	Glasgow	Scotland	Clyde Auditorium	—N/a	—N/a	—N/a
March 7, 2015 ^{[B]}	London	England	The O_{2} Arena	—N/a	27,707 / 30,022	$2,865,170
March 8, 2015	Dublin	Ireland	3Arena	—N/a	—N/a	—N/a
North America Leg 4
May 1, 2015	Hamilton	Canada	FirstOntario Centre	Randy Houser; Dustin Lynch	14,557 / 14,577	$946,692
May 2, 2015	Ottawa	Canada	Canadian Tire Centre	Randy Houser; Dustin Lynch	14,201 / 14, 201	$907,028
May 3, 2015	London	Canada	Budweiser Gardens	Randy Houser; Dustin Lynch	8,817 / 8,817	$562,871
May 6, 2015	Winnipeg	Canada	MTS Centre	Randy Houser; Dustin Lynch	22,730 / 22,730	$1,471,800
May 7, 2015	Winnipeg	Canada	MTS Centre	Randy Houser; Dustin Lynch	22,730 / 22,730	$1,471,800
TOTAL					1,237,544 / 1,264,806	$59,523,143

List of festivals and fairs
^{A} This concert was a part of the Great Jones Fair.
^{B} This concert was a part of the C2C: Country to Country country music festival.

Notes:

- Due to stage collapse the Lexington, Kentucky show was moved from January 17, 2014 to February 21.
- Due inclement weather the Greensboro, North Carolina show was moved from February 13 to February 17.

== Critical reception ==
Tara Toro of Got Country Online says, "Whether you like his music or not, there is no denying, Luke is an entertainer with a capital "E". And gave 200% for the hour and a half he was on stage. The only song that really didn't go over well with the crowd was the combo of "Mukalee Creek Water"/"Drinkin' Beer and Wastin Bullets."
