= Kick the Dust Up Tour =

2015 concert tour by Luke Bryan

- Tour by Luke Bryan
- Promotional poster for the tour
- Associated album: Spring Break...Checkin' Out; Kill the Lights
- Start date: May 8, 2015
- End date: October 30, 2015
- Legs: 1
- No. of shows: 52
- Box office: U.S. $71.5 million

Luke Bryan concert chronology
- That's My Kind of Night Tour (2014–15); Kick the Dust Up Tour (2015); Farm Tour (2015) Kill the Lights Tour (2016)

Kick the Dust Up Tour was the third headlining concert tour by American country music singer Luke Bryan, in support of his albums Spring Break...Checkin' Out (2014), and Kill the Lights (2015). It began on May 8, 2015, in Grand Forks, North Dakota and finished on October 30, 2015, in Detroit, Michigan. This tour began the day after his previous tour ended. The tour was the eighth ranked North American tour of 2015, and grossed $71.5 million in revenue.

== Background ==
The tour was first announced in January 2015. Supporting Bryan were fellow country music artists Florida Georgia Line, Randy Houser, Dustin Lynch, Thomas Rhett and DJ Rock.

== Concert synopsis ==
The show begins with Bryan being risen up from a platform under a circular stage while singing the opening number, "Kick the Dust Up". Bryan's concert attire consists of a ball cap, T-shirt, and black jeans. When covering Maroon 5's "Sugar", supporting acts Randy Houser and Dustin Lynch were brought up stage to perform it with Bryan. The setlist is pretty much the same as it was on Bryan's previous tour.

== Setlist ==
Arenas & Amphitheatres Leg 1
1. "Kick the Dust Up"
2. "All My Friends Say"
3. "Kiss Tomorrow Goodbye"
4. "Roller Coaster"
5. "Play It Again"
6. "Sugar (Maroon 5 cover) (with Randy Houser & Dustin Lynch)
7. "Mountain Music" (Alabama cover) (select shows)
8. "Games" (select shows)
9. "Crash My Party"
10. "Someone Else Calling You Baby"
11. "This Is How We Roll"
12. "Do I"
13. "Drink a Beer"
14. "Drunk on You"
15. "Rain Is a Good Thing"
16. "I See You"
17. "I Don't Want This Night to End/Dynamite (Taio Cruz cover)

Encore

1. "That's My Kind of Night"
2. "Country Girl (Shake It for Me)/Talk Dirty (Jason Derulo cover)
Arenas & Amphitheatres Leg 2
1. "Kick the Dust Up"
2. "All My Friends Say"
3. "Kiss Tomorrow Goodbye"
4. "Roller Coaster"
5. "Play It Again"
6. "Sugar (Maroon 5 cover) (with Randy Houser & Dustin Lynch)
7. "Mountain Music" (Alabama cover) (select shows)
8. "Strip It Down"
9. "Crash My Party"
10. "Huntin', Fishin' and Lovin' Every Day"
11. "Someone Else Calling You Baby"
12. "This Is How We Roll"
13. "Do I"
14. "Drink a Beer"
15. "Drunk on You"
16. "Rain Is a Good Thing"
17. "I See You"
18. "Get Lucky"
19. "I Don't Want This Night to End/Dynamite (Taio Cruz cover)

Encore

1. "That's My Kind of Night"
2. "Country Girl (Shake It for Me)/Talk Dirty (Jason Derulo cover)
Sports Authority Field & TCF Bank Stadium
1. "Kick the Dust Up"
2. "All My Friends Say"
3. "Kiss Tomorrow Goodbye"
4. "Roller Coaster"
5. "Play It Again"
6. "Sugar (Maroon 5 cover) (with Randy Houser, Thomas Rhett & Dustin Lynch)
7. "Mountain Music" (Alabama cover) (with Florida Georgia Line)
8. "Faithfully" (Journey cover) (with Florida Georgia Line)
9. "Games" (select shows)
10. "Crash My Party"
11. "Someone Else Calling You Baby"
12. "The Only Way I Know"
13. "Do I"
14. "Drink a Beer"
15. "Drunk on You"
16. "Rain Is a Good Thing"
17. "I See You"
18. "I Don't Want This Night to End/Dynamite (Taio Cruz cover)

Encore

1. "That's My Kind of Night"
2. "Country Girl (Shake It for Me)/Talk Dirty (Jason Derulo cover)
Vanderbilt Stadium
1. "Kick the Dust Up"
2. "All My Friends Say"
3. "Kiss Tomorrow Goodbye"
4. "Roller Coaster"
5. "Play It Again"
6. "Sugar (Maroon 5 cover) (with Randy Houser, Thomas Rhett & Dustin Lynch)
7. "Games" (select shows)
8. "Crash My Party"
9. "Someone Else Calling You Baby"
10. "Mountain Music" (Alabama cover) (with Florida Georgia Line)
11. "Faithfully" (Journey) cover (with Florida Georgia Line)
12. "Do I"
13. "Drink a Beer"
14. "Drunk on You"
15. "Rain Is a Good Thing"
16. "I See You"
17. "I Don't Want This Night to End/Dynamite (Taio Cruz cover)

Encore

1. "That's My Kind of Night"
2. "Country Girl (Shake It for Me)/Talk Dirty (Jason Derulo cover)
Paul Brown Stadium
1. "Kick the Dust Up"
2. "All My Friends Say"
3. "Kiss Tomorrow Goodbye"
4. "Roller Coaster"
5. "Play It Again"
6. "Sugar (Maroon 5 cover) (with Randy Houser, Thomas Rhett & Dustin Lynch)
7. "Games" (select shows)
8. "Crash My Party"
9. "Someone Else Calling You Baby"
10. "Where the Green Grass Grows" (Tim McGraw cover) (with Florida Georgia Line)
11. "This Is How We Roll" (with Florida Georgia Line)
12. "Faithfully" (Journey cover)
13. "Mountain Music" (Alabama cover)
14. "Do I"
15. "Drink a Beer"
16. "Drunk on You"
17. "Rain Is a Good Thing"
18. "I See You"
19. "I Don't Want This Night to End/Dynamite (Taio Cruz cover)

Encore

1. "That's My Kind of Night"
2. "Country Girl (Shake It for Me)/Talk Dirty (Jason Derulo cover)
Levi's Stadium/FirstEnergy Stadium
1. "Kick the Dust Up"
2. "All My Friends Say"
3. "Kiss Tomorrow Goodbye"
4. "Roller Coaster"
5. "Play It Again"
6. "Sugar (Maroon 5 cover) (with Randy Houser, Thomas Rhett & Dustin Lynch)
7. "Where the Green Grass Grows" (Tim McGraw cover) (With Florida Georgia Line)
8. "Strip It Down"
9. "Crash My Party"
10. "Huntin', Fishin' and Lovin' Every Day"
11. "Someone Else Calling You Baby"
12. "Do I"
13. "Drink a Beer"
14. "Drunk on You"
15. "Rain Is a Good Thing"
16. "I See You"
17. "I Don't Want This Night to End/Dynamite (Taio Cruz cover)

Encore

1. "That's My Kind of Night"
2. "Country Girl (Shake It for Me)/Talk Dirty (Jason Derulo cover)
Ford Field
1. "Kick the Dust Up"
2. "All My Friends Say"
3. "Kiss Tomorrow Goodbye"
4. "Roller Coaster"
5. "Play It Again"
6. "Sugar (Maroon 5 cover) (with Randy Houser & Dustin Lynch)
7. "Lot of Leavin' Left to Do (Dierks Bentley cover) (With Dierks Bentley)
8. "Strip It Down"
9. "Crash My Party"
10. "Huntin', Fishin' and Lovin' Every Day"
11. "Someone Else Calling You Baby"
12. "This Is How We Roll" (Florida Georgia Line cover)
13. "Do I"
14. "Drink a Beer"
15. "Drunk on You"
16. "Rain Is a Good Thing"
17. "I See You"
18. "Get Lucky"
19. "I Don't Want This Night to End/Dynamite (Taio Cruz cover)

Encore

1. "That's My Kind of Night"
2. "Country Girl (Shake It for Me)/Talk Dirty (Jason Derulo cover)

== Tour dates ==
Date	City	Country	Venue	Opening acts	Attendance	Revenue
North America leg 1
May 8, 2015	Grand Forks	United States	Alerus Center	Randy Houser; Dustin Lynch	17,698 / 17,698	$1,145,430
May 9, 2015	Sioux Falls	United States	Denny Sanford Premier Center	Randy Houser; Dustin Lynch	10,747 / 10,747	$706,973
May 14, 2015	Boise	United States	Taco Bell Arena	Randy Houser; Dustin Lynch	9,298 / 9,298	$601,676
May 15, 2015	Spokane	United States	Spokane Arena	Randy Houser; Dustin Lynch	10,455 / 10,824	$704,876
May 16, 2015	Tacoma	United States	Tacoma Dome	Randy Houser; Dustin Lynch	19,161 / 19,161	$1,174,466
June 4, 2015	Albuquerque	United States	Isleta Amphitheater	Randy Houser; Dustin Lynch	15,267 / 15,267	$641,869
June 6, 2015^{[A]}	Denver	United States	Sports Authority Field	Florida Georgia Line; Randy Houser; Thomas Rhett; Dustin Lynch; DJ Rock	50,539 / 50,539	$3,642,005
June 18, 2015	Tulsa	United States	BOK Center	Randy Houser; Dustin Lynch	11,411 / 11,411	$708,838
June 19, 2015	Bonner Springs	United States	Cricket Wireless Amphitheater	Randy Houser; Dustin Lynch	17,940 / 17,940	$714,550
June 20, 2015	Minneapolis	United States	TCF Bank Stadium	Florida Georgia Line; Randy Houser; Thomas Rhett; Dustin Lynch; DJ Rock	41,290 / 44,699	$3,593,389
June 24, 2015	Virginia Beach	United States	Farm Bureau Live	Randy Houser; Dustin Lynch	32,354 / 38,632	$1,271,249
June 25, 2015	Virginia Beach	United States	Farm Bureau Live	Randy Houser; Dustin Lynch	32,354 / 38,632	$1,271,249
June 26, 2015	Bristow	United States	Jiffy Lube Live	Randy Houser; Dustin Lynch	38,096 / 41,468	$1,580,842
June 27, 2015	Bristow	United States	Jiffy Lube Live	Randy Houser; Dustin Lynch	38,096 / 41,468	$1,580,842
June 28, 2015^{[B]}	New York City	United States	Randall's Island	Randy Houser; Dustin Lynch	—	—
July 9, 2015	Durant	United States	Choctaw Events Center	Dustin Lynch	3,077 / 3,077	$566,050
July 11, 2015 ^{[A]}	Nashville	United States	Vanderbilt Stadium	Florida Georgia Line; Randy Houser; Thomas Rhett; Dustin Lynch; DJ Rock	31,907 / 31,907	$2,705,682
July 16, 2015	Maryland Heights	United States	Hollywood Casino Amphitheatre	Randy Houser; Dustin Lynch	38,310 / 39,392	$1,483,945
July 17, 2015	Maryland Heights	United States	Hollywood Casino Amphitheatre	Randy Houser; Dustin Lynch	38,310 / 39,392	$1,483,945
July 18, 2015^{[A]}	Cincinnati	United States	Paul Brown Stadium	Florida Georgia Line; Randy Houser; Thomas Rhett; Dustin Lynch; DJ Rock	52,019 / 52,019	$3,103,468
July 20, 2015	Gilford	United States	Bank of New Hampshire Pavilion	Randy Houser; Dustin Lynch	24,393 / 24,393	$1,512,334
July 22, 2015	Gilford	United States	Bank of New Hampshire Pavilion	Randy Houser; Dustin Lynch	24,393 / 24,393	$1,512,334
July 24, 2015	Noblesville	United States	Klipsch Music Center	Randy Houser; Dustin Lynch	49,992 / 49,992	$1,797,996
July 25, 2015	Noblesville	United States	Klipsch Music Center	Randy Houser; Dustin Lynch	49,992 / 49,992	$1,797,996
July 26, 2015^{[C]}	Twin Lakes	United States	Country Thunder Twin Lakes	Randy Houser; Dustin Lynch	—	—
July 30, 2015	Scranton	United States	The Pavilion at Montage Mountain	Randy Houser; Dustin Lynch	17,480 / 17,480	$731,106
July 31, 2015	Burgettstown	United States	First Niagara Pavilion	Randy Houser; Dustin Lynch	44,690 / 45,864	$1,676,475
August 1, 2015	Burgettstown	United States	First Niagara Pavilion	Randy Houser; Dustin Lynch	44,690 / 45,864	$1,676,475
North America leg 2
August 15, 2015^{[E]}	Brownsville	United States	Bi-Mart Willamette Country Music Festival	Randy Houser; Dustin Lynch	—	—
August 21, 2015	Atlanta	United States	Philips Arena	Randy Houser; Dustin Lynch	21,040 / 24,619	$1,336,860
August 22, 2015	Atlanta	United States	Philips Arena	Randy Houser; Dustin Lynch	21,040 / 24,619	$1,336,860
August 26, 2015	West Valley City	United States	USANA Amphitheatre	Randy Houser; Dustin Lynch	36,941 / 36,941	$1,638,560
August 27, 2015	West Valley City	United States	USANA Amphitheatre	Randy Houser; Dustin Lynch	36,941 / 36,941	$1,638,560
August 29, 2015^{[A]}	Santa Clara	United States	Levi's Stadium	Florida Georgia Line; Randy Houser; Thomas Rhett; Dustin Lynch; DJ Rock	46,919 / 46,919	$3,819,758
September 3, 2015	Darien Center	United States	Darien Lake PAC	Randy Houser; Dustin Lynch	35,288 / 42,394	$1,532,528
September 4, 2015	Darien Center	United States	Darien Lake PAC	Randy Houser; Dustin Lynch	35,288 / 42,394	$1,532,528
September 5, 2015^{[A]}	Cleveland	United States	FirstEnergy Stadium	Florida Georgia Line; Randy Houser; Dustin Lynch; DJ Rock	42,012 / 42,012	$3,229,227
September 11, 2015	Camden	United States	Susquehanna Bank Center	Randy Houser; Dustin Lynch	50,022 / 50,022	$1,946,907
September 12, 2015	Camden	United States	Susquehanna Bank Center	Randy Houser; Dustin Lynch	50,022 / 50,022	$1,946,907
September 17, 2015	Jacksonville	United States	Jacksonville Veterans Memorial Arena	Randy Houser; Dustin Lynch	10,778 / 10,788	$696,558
September 18, 2015	Tampa	United States	MidFlorida Credit Union Amphitheatre	Randy Houser; Dustin Lynch	19,290 / 19,290	$896,865
September 19, 2015	West Palm Beach	United States	Perfect Vodka Amphitheatre	Randy Houser; Dustin Lynch	33,824 / 38,880	$1,313,126
September 20, 2015	West Palm Beach	United States	Perfect Vodka Amphitheatre	Randy Houser; Dustin Lynch	33,824 / 38,880	$1,313,126
September 24, 2015	Charlotte	United States	PNC Music Pavilion	Randy Houser; Dustin Lynch	18,489 / 18,489	$727,070
September 25, 2015	Raleigh	United States	Walnut Creek Amphitheatre	Randy Houser; Dustin Lynch	38,391 / 39,864	$1,434,216
September 26, 2015	Raleigh	United States	Walnut Creek Amphitheatre	Randy Houser; Dustin Lynch	38,391 / 39,864	$1,434,216
October 15, 2015	Wheatland	United States	Toyota Amphitheatre	Randy Houser; Dustin Lynch	—	—
October 16, 2015	Chula Vista	United States	Sleep Train Amphitheatre	Randy Houser; Dustin Lynch	—	—
October 17, 2015	Irvine	United States	Verizon Wireless Amphitheatre	Randy Houser; Dustin Lynch	—	—
October 18, 2015	Irvine	United States	Verizon Wireless Amphitheatre	Randy Houser; Dustin Lynch	—	—
October 22, 2015	San Antonio	United States	Alamodome	Randy Houser; Dustin Lynch	—	—
October 23, 2015	Dallas	United States	Gexa Energy Pavilion	Randy Houser; Dustin Lynch	—	—
October 24, 2015	Dallas	United States	Gexa Energy Pavilion	Randy Houser; Dustin Lynch	—	—
October 28, 2015	Chicago	United States	United Center	Randy Houser; Dustin Lynch	—	—
October 29, 2015	Chicago	United States	United Center	Randy Houser; Dustin Lynch	—	—
October 30, 2015^{[E]}	Detroit	United States	Ford Field	Dierks Bentley; Randy Houser; Dustin Lynch; DJ Rock	—	—
Total					889,208 / 922,116	$71.5 million

Festivals and other miscellaneous performances
^{A} This concert has Florida Georgia Line, Thomas Rhett and DJ Rock added for this show ONLY.
^{B} This concert was a part of "Farm Burough Festival".
^{C} This concert was a part of "Country Thunder Twin Lakes".
^{D} This concert was a part of "Bi-Mart Willamette Country Music Festival".
^{E} This concert has Dierks Bentley and DJ Rock added for this show ONLY.
