= Kill the Lights Tour =

2016–17 concert tour by Luke Bryan

- Tour by Luke Bryan
- Promotional poster for the tour
- Associated album: Kill the Lights
- Start date: February 18, 2016
- End date: March 18, 2017
- Legs: 2
- No. of shows: 87
- Box office: $69,840,333

Luke Bryan concert chronology
- Kick the Dust Up Tour (2015); Kill the Lights Tour (2016–17); Huntin', Fishin' and Lovin' Every Day Tour (2017)

The Kill the Lights Tour was the fourth headlining concert tour by American country music artist Luke Bryan. The tour is in support of his fifth studio album Kill the Lights (2015) and began on February 18, 2016, in Evansville, Indiana. The tour played before 1.6 million fans in 2016. The tour's second leg began on February 16, 2017, in Huntington, West Virginia and ended on March 18, 2017, in Orange Beach, Alabama.

== Background ==
The tour was first announced on October 20, 2015 though Bryan's website. In November 2016, Bryan announced the tour would continue into 2017.

== Opening acts ==
- Little Big Town
- Dustin Lynch
- Brett Eldredge

== Set list ==
1. "Rain Is a Good Thing"
2. "Kick the Dust Up
3. "Kiss Tomorrow Goodbye"
4. "Move"
5. "I See You"
6. "Crash My Party"
7. "Roller Coaster"
8. "Play It Again"
9. "Strip It Down"
10. "Home Alone Tonight" (with Karen Fairchild)
11. "Thinkin Out Loud" / "Let's Get It On" (with Little Big Town)
12. "Play Something Country (with Dustin Lynch)
13. "Huntin', Fishin' and Lovin' Every Day"
14. "Drink a Beer"
15. "Drunk on You"
16. "All My Friends Say" / "Country Man"
17. "That's My Kind of Night"

Encore

18. "Country Girl (Shake It for Me)"
19. "I Don't Want This Night to End" / "Can't Feel My Face"

== Tour dates ==
Date	City	Country	Venue	Opening acts	Attendance	Revenue
North America Leg 1
February 18, 2016	Evansville	United States	Ford Center	Little Big Town; Dustin Lynch	8,500 / 8,500	$586,740
February 19, 2016	Peoria	United States	Peoria Civic Center	Little Big Town; Dustin Lynch	9,350 / 9,759	$623,741
February 20, 2016	Cedar Falls	United States	UNI-Dome	Little Big Town; Dustin Lynch	19,157 / 19,608	$1,025,207
February 25, 2016	Montreal	Canada	Bell Centre	Little Big Town; Dustin Lynch	15,985 / 15,985	$871,055
February 26, 2016	Uncasville	United States	Mohegan Sun Arena	Little Big Town; Dustin Lynch	13,449 / 13,449	$1,722,277
February 27, 2016	Uncasville	United States	Mohegan Sun Arena	Little Big Town; Dustin Lynch	13,449 / 13,449	$1,722,277
March 8, 2016	Las Cruces	United States	Pan American Center	Dustin Lynch	10,295 / 10,514	$675,389
March 10, 2016	Houston	United States	Houston Livestock Show and Rodeo	—	—	—
March 11, 2016	North Little Rock	United States	Verizon Arena	Little Big Town; Dustin Lynch	12,972 / 14,182	$752,385
March 12, 2016	Bossier City	United States	CenturyLink Center	Little Big Town; Dustin Lynch	—	—
April 7, 2016	Charleston	United States	Charleston Civic Center	Little Big Town; Dustin Lynch	—	—
April 8, 2016	Baltimore	United States	Royal Farms Arena	Little Big Town; Dustin Lynch	12,268 / 12,268	$823,319
April 9, 2016	Syracuse	United States	Carrier Dome	Little Big Town; Dustin Lynch	36,141 / 36,141	$1,846,421
April 14, 2016	Toledo	United States	Huntington Center	Little Big Town; Dustin Lynch	—	—
April 15, 2016	University Park	United States	Bryce Jordan Center	Little Big Town; Dustin Lynch	12,515 / 12,515	$824,466
April 16, 2016	Charlottesville	United States	John Paul Jones Arena	Little Big Town; Dustin Lynch	11,822 / 11,822	$824,176
April 20, 2016	Missoula	United States	Adams Center	Little Big Town; Dustin Lynch	—	—
April 21, 2016	Missoula	United States	Adams Center	Little Big Town; Dustin Lynch	—	—
April 22, 2016	Bozeman	United States	Brick Breeden Fieldhouse	Little Big Town; Dustin Lynch	15,872 / 15,872	$1,128,090
April 23, 2016	Bozeman	United States	Brick Breeden Fieldhouse	Little Big Town; Dustin Lynch	15,872 / 15,872	$1,128,090
April 29, 2016	Concord	United States	Concord Pavilion	Little Big Town; Dustin Lynch	—	—
April 30, 2016	Fresno	United States	Save Mart Center	Little Big Town; Dustin Lynch	11,945 / 11,945	$801,719
May 12, 2016	Omaha	United States	CenturyLink Center Omaha	Little Big Town; Dustin Lynch	15,079 / 15,079	$1,028,782
May 13, 2016	Wichita	United States	Intrust Bank Arena	Little Big Town; Dustin Lynch	11,357 / 11,894	$873,075
May 14, 2016	Oklahoma City	United States	Chesapeake Energy Arena	Little Big Town; Dustin Lynch	13,060 / 13,060	$899,435
May 20, 2016	Atlanta	United States	Aaron's Amphitheatre	Little Big Town; Dustin Lynch	32,221 / 37,720	$1,472,814
May 21, 2016	Atlanta	United States	Aaron's Amphitheatre	Little Big Town; Dustin Lynch	32,221 / 37,720	$1,472,814
May 27, 2016	Baton Rouge	United States	LSU Tiger Stadium	—	—	—
May 29, 2016	Daytona Beach	United States	Daytona International Speedway	—	—	—
June 2, 2016	Holmdel	United States	PNC Bank Arts Center	Little Big Town; Dustin Lynch	16,950 / 16,950	$871,177
June 3, 2016	Atlantic City	United States	Boardwalk Hall	Little Big Town; Dustin Lynch	11,639 / 11,639	$893,650
June 4, 2016	Hershey	United States	Hersheypark Stadium	Little Big Town; Dustin Lynch	25,564 / 27,060	$1,375,679
June 9, 2016	Virginia Beach	United States	Veterans United Home Loans Amphitheater	Little Big Town; Dustin Lynch	19,805 / 19,805	$873,466
June 10, 2016	Bristow	United States	Jiffy Lube Live	Little Big Town; Dustin Lynch	37,771 / 45,274	$1,780,548
June 11, 2016	Bristow	United States	Jiffy Lube Live	Little Big Town; Dustin Lynch	37,771 / 45,274	$1,780,548
June 19, 2016	Columbus	United States	Ohio Stadium	—	—	—
June 24, 2016	Toronto	Canada	Molson Canadian Amphitheatre	Little Big Town; Dustin Lynch	31,678 / 31,678	$1,334,690
June 25, 2016	Toronto	Canada	Molson Canadian Amphitheatre	Little Big Town; Dustin Lynch	31,678 / 31,678	$1,334,690
July 7, 2016 ^{[A]}	Milwaukee	United States	Marcus Amphitheater	Frankie Ballard	21,758 / 22,861	$1,169,830
July 8, 2016	Noblesville	United States	Klipsch Music Center	Little Big Town; Dustin Lynch	43,837 / 48,765	$1,499,243
July 9, 2016	Noblesville	United States	Klipsch Music Center	Little Big Town; Dustin Lynch	43,837 / 48,765	$1,499,243
July 15, 2016	Foxborough	United States	Gillette Stadium	Little Big Town; Chris Stapleton; Dustin Lynch	76,450 / 87,871	$7,511,536
July 16, 2016	Foxborough	United States	Gillette Stadium	Little Big Town; Chris Stapleton; Dustin Lynch	76,450 / 87,871	$7,511,536
July 17, 2016	Bangor	United States	Darling's Waterfront Pavilion	Little Big Town; Dustin Lynch	—	—
July 21, 2016	Scranton	United States	The Pavilion at Montage Mountain	Little Big Town; Dustin Lynch	—	—
July 22, 2016	Burgettstown	United States	First Niagara Pavilion	Little Big Town; Dustin Lynch	42,160 / 46,086	$1,724,225
July 23, 2016	Burgettstown	United States	First Niagara Pavilion	Little Big Town; Dustin Lynch	42,160 / 46,086	$1,724,225
July 28, 2016	Hopewell	United States	CMAC	Little Big Town; Dustin Lynch	—	—
July 29, 2016	Camden	United States	BB&T Pavilion	Little Big Town; Dustin Lynch	50,046 / 50,046	$2,086,357
July 30, 2016	Camden	United States	BB&T Pavilion	Little Big Town; Dustin Lynch	50,046 / 50,046	$2,086,357
July 31, 2016	Saratoga Springs	United States	Saratoga Performing Arts Center	Little Big Town; Dustin Lynch	25,091 / 25,091	$1,087,914
August 11, 2016	Cuyahoga Falls	United States	Blossom Music Center	Little Big Town; Dustin Lynch	37,267 / 41,724	$1,776,354
August 12, 2016	Cuyahoga Falls	United States	Blossom Music Center	Little Big Town; Dustin Lynch	37,267 / 41,724	$1,776,354
August 13, 2016	Cincinnati	United States	Riverbend Music Center	Little Big Town; Dustin Lynch	36,023 / 40,709	$1,545,846
August 14, 2016	Cincinnati	United States	Riverbend Music Center	Little Big Town; Dustin Lynch	36,023 / 40,709	$1,545,846
August 19, 2016	Minneapolis	United States	U.S. Bank Stadium	Little Big Town; Dustin Lynch	47,219 / 47,219	$4,565,264
August 21, 2016	Calgary	Canada	Prairie Winds Park	—	—	—
August 25, 2016	Bonner Springs	United States	Providence Medical Center Amphitheater	Little Big Town; Frankie Ballard	—	—
August 26, 2016	Maryland Heights	United States	Hollywood Casino Amphitheatre	Little Big Town; Dustin Lynch	20,000 / 20,000	$890,556
August 27, 2016	Chicago	United States	Wrigley Field	Little Big Town; Dustin Lynch	41,819 / 41,819	$4,457,358
September 1, 2016	Charlotte	United States	PNC Music Pavilion	Little Big Town; Dustin Lynch	—	—
September 2, 2016	Raleigh	United States	Coastal Credit Union Music Park	Little Big Town; Dustin Lynch	31,965 / 34,554	$1,403,186
September 3, 2016	Raleigh	United States	Coastal Credit Union Music Park	Little Big Town; Dustin Lynch	31,965 / 34,554	$1,403,186
September 9, 2016	Denver	United States	Dick's Sporting Goods Park	Little Big Town; Dustin Lynch	33,792 / 40,000	$2,926,618
September 10, 2016	Denver	United States	Dick's Sporting Goods Park	Little Big Town; Dustin Lynch	33,792 / 40,000	$2,926,618
September 15, 2016	Wheatland	United States	Toyota Amphitheatre	Little Big Town; Dustin Lynch	18,500 / 18,500	$891,170
September 16, 2016	Mountain View	United States	Shoreline Amphitheatre	Little Big Town; Dustin Lynch	22,019 / 22,019	$924,835
September 17, 2016	Chula Vista	United States	Sleep Train Amphihtheatre	Little Big Town; Dustin Lynch	18,797 / 19,702	$927,941
September 22, 2016	Phoenix	United States	Ak-Chin Pavilion	Little Big Town; Dustin Lynch	19,273 / 19,273	$933,121
September 24, 2016	Irvine	United States	Irvine Meadows Amphitheatre	Little Big Town; Dustin Lynch	14,914 / 14,914	$901,779
September 30, 2016	West Valley City	United States	USANA Amphitheatre	Little Big Town; Dustin Lynch	16,751 / 19,376	$802,265
October 1, 2016	West Valley City	United States	USANA Amphitheatre	Little Big Town; Dustin Lynch	16,751 / 19,376	$802,265
October 22, 2016	Arlington	United States	AT&T Stadium	Little Big Town; Chris Stapleton; Dustin Lynch	—	—
October 29, 2016	Detroit	United States	Ford Field	Little Big Town; Chris Stapleton; Dustin Lynch	—	—
North America Leg 2
February 16, 2017	Huntington	United States	Big Sandy Superstore Arena	Brett Eldredge	6,816 / 6,816	$475,526
February 17, 2017	Bloomington	United States	Simon Skjodt Assembly Hall	Brett Eldredge	10,136 / 11,835	$671,311
February 18, 2017	Jonesboro	United States	ASU Convocation Center	Brett Eldredge	7,065 / 7,065	$509,655
February 23, 2017	Columbia	United States	Colonial Life Arena	Brett Eldredge	10,125 / 11,642	$649,626
February 25, 2017	Jacksonville	United States	Jacksonville Veterans Memorial Arena	Brett Eldredge	12,027 / 12,027	$790,564
March 1, 2017	New York City	United States	Madison Square Garden	Brett Eldredge	14,981 / 14,981	$1,086,993
March 3, 2017	Manchester	United States	SNHU Arena	Brett Eldredge	8,863 / 8,863	$607,912
March 4, 2017	Providence	United States	Dunkin' Donuts Center	Brett Eldredge	10,548 / 10,548	$697,518
March 9, 2017	Richmond	United States	Richmond Coliseum	Brett Eldredge	—	—
March 10, 2017	Fayetteville	United States	Crown Coliseum	Brett Eldredge	7,595 / 7,595	$483,124
March 11, 2017	Greenville	United States	Bon Secours Wellness Arena	Brett Eldredge	11,696 / 11,696	$731,407
March 17, 2017	Orange Beach	United States	Amphitheater at the Wharf	Brett Eldredge	19,412 / 19,412	$1,203,301
March 18, 2017	Orange Beach	United States	Amphitheater at the Wharf	Brett Eldredge	19,412 / 19,412	$1,203,301
Total					1,142,340 / 1,205,728	$69,840,333

List of festivals
^{A} This concert was part of the Summerfest at Marcus Amphitheater in Henry Maier Festival Park.

== Personnel ==
- Michael Carter – band leader, electric guitar
- Jason Faussett – acoustic guitar, piano
- James Cook – bass guitar
- Kent Slucher – drums
- Kevin Arrowsmith – fiddle, electric guitar
- Dave Ristrum – banjo
