= Billboard Music Award for Top Country Song =

Annual American music award

The Billboard Music Award winners for Top Country Song. Notable winners include Wynonna Judd, Taylor Swift, Florida Georgia Line, and Thomas Rhett.

== Winners and nominees ==
Winners are listed first and highlighted in bold.

=== 1990s ===
Year	Song	Artist	Ref.
1992	**"I Saw the Light"**	**Wynonna Judd**	
1993-1994	—N/a		
1995	**"Sold"**	**John Michael Montgomery**	
1995	"Any Man of Mine"	Shania Twain	
1995	"I Like It, I Love It"	Tim McGraw	
1995	"Summer's Comin'"	Clint Black	
1996	**"My Maria"**	**Brooks & Dunn**	
1996	"Blue Clear Sky"	George Strait	
1996	"Time Marches On"	Tracy Lawrence	
1996	"Daddy's Money"	Ricochet	
1997-1999	—N/a		

=== 2000s ===
Year	Song	Artist	Ref.
2000	—N/a		
2001	**"Ain't Nothing 'bout You"**	**Brooks & Dunn**	
2002-2009	—N/a		

=== 2010s ===
Year	Song	Artist	Ref.
2010	—N/a		
2011	**"Need You Now"**	**Lady A**	
2011	"If I Die Young"	The Band Perry	
2011	"The House That Built Me"	Miranda Lambert	
2011	"Stuck Like Glue"	Sugarland	
2011	"Mine"	Taylor Swift	
2012	**"Dirt Road Anthem"**	**Jason Aldean**	
2012	"Crazy Girl"	Eli Young Band	
2012	"Honey Bee"	Blake Shelton	
2012	"Just a Kiss"	Lady A	
2012	"Country Girl (Shake It for Me)"	Luke Bryan	
2013	**"We Are Never Ever Getting Back Together"**	**Taylor Swift**	
2013	"Drunk on You"	Luke Bryan	
2013	"Springsteen"	Eric Church	
2013	"Cruise"	Florida Georgia Line	
2013	"Wanted"	Hunter Hayes	
2014	**"Cruise"**	**Florida Georgia Line and Nelly**	
2014	"Crash My Party"	Luke Bryan	
2014	"That's My Kind of Night"	Luke Bryan	
2014	"Wagon Wheel"	Darius Rucker	
2014	"Boys 'Round Here"	Blake Shelton featuring Pistol Annies	
2015	**"Burnin' It Down"**	**Jason Aldean**	
2015	"Play It Again"	Luke Bryan	
2015	"Leave the Night On	Sam Hunt	
2015	"This Is How We Roll"	Florida Georgia Line featuring Luke Bryan	
2015	"Dirt"	Florida Georgia Line	
2016	**"Die a Happy Man"**	**Thomas Rhett**	
2016	"Break Up in a Small Town"	Sam Hunt	
2016	"Take Your Time"	Sam Hunt	
2016	"Girl Crush"	Little Big Town	
2016	"I'm Comin' Over"	Chris Young	
2017	**"H.O.L.Y."**	**Florida Georgia Line**	
2017	"Setting the World on Fire"	Kenny Chesney featuring P!nk	
2017	"May We All"	Florida Georgia Line featuring Tim McGraw	
2017	"Better Man"	Little Big Town	
2017	"Blue Ain't Your Color"	Keith Urban	
2018	**"Body Like a Back Road"**	**Sam Hunt**	
2018	"What Ifs"	Kane Brown featuring Lauren Alaina	
2018	"Small Town Boy"	Dustin Lynch	
2018	"Meant to Be"	Bebe Rexha featuring Florida Georgia Line	
2018	"In Case You Didn't Know"	Brett Young	
2019	**"Meant to Be"**	**Bebe Rexha featuring Florida Georgia Line**	
2019	"Heaven"	Kane Brown	
2019	"She Got the Best of Me"	Luke Combs	
2019	"Speechless"	Dan + Shay	
2019	"Tequila"	Dan + Shay	

=== 2020s ===
Year	Song	Artist	Ref.
2020	**"10,000 Hours"**	**Dan + Shay and Justin Bieber**	
2020	"The Bones"	Maren Morris	
2020	"One Man Band"	Old Dominion	
2020	"God's Country"	Blake Shelton	
2020	"Whiskey Glasses"	Morgan Wallen	
2021	**"I Hope"**	**Gabby Barrett featuring Charlie Puth**	
2021	"Got What I Got"	Jason Aldean	
2021	"One of Them Girls"	Lee Brice	
2021	"Chasin' You"	Morgan Wallen	
2021	"More Than My Hometown"	Morgan Wallen	
2022	**"Fancy Like"**	**Walker Hayes**	
2022	"If I Didn't Love You"	Jason Aldean and Carrie Underwood	
2022	"Forever After All"	Luke Combs	
2022	"Buy Dirt"	Jordan Davis featuring Luke Bryan	
2022	"You Should Probably Leave"	Chris Stapleton	
2023	**"Last Night"**	**Morgan Wallen**	
2023	"Something in the Orange"	Zach Bryan	
2023	"Fast Car"	Luke Combs	
2023	"You Proof"	Morgan Wallen	
2023	"Rock and a Hard Place"	Bailey Zimmerman	
2024	**"A Bar Song (Tipsy)"**	**Shaboozey**	
2024	Zach Bryan featuring Kacey Musgraves	"I Remember Everything"	
2024	Dasha	"Austin"	
2024	Post Malone featuring Morgan Wallen	"I Had Some Help"	
2024	Morgan Wallen	"Thinkin' Bout Me"	

== Superlatives ==
Win

- 2 (Jason Aldean, Brooks & Dunn)

Nominations

- 6 (Luke Bryan); 4 (Florida Georgia Line); 3 (Sam Hunt); 2 (Jason Aldean, Brooks & Dunn, Lady Antebellum, Blake Shelton)
