= List of number-one country singles of 2014 (Canada) =

Canada Country was a chart published weekly by Billboard magazine.

This 50-position chart lists the most popular country music songs, calculated weekly by airplay on 31 country music stations across the country as monitored by Nielsen BDS. Songs are ranked by total plays. As with most other Billboard charts, the Canada Country chart features a rule for when a song enters recurrent rotation. A song is declared recurrent if it has been on the chart longer than 30 weeks and is lower than number 20 in rank.

These are the Canadian number-one country singles of 2014, per the BDS Canada Country Airplay chart.

Note that Billboard publishes charts with an issue date approximately 7–10 days in advance.

"River Bank" by Brad Paisley attained the number-one spot on the year-end chart despite only peaking at number two in 2014.

Issue date	Country Song	Artist	Ref.
January 4	"Stay"	Florida Georgia Line	
January 11	"Stay"	Florida Georgia Line	
January 18	"Stay"	Florida Georgia Line	
January 25	"Stay"	Florida Georgia Line	
February 1	"Don't Let Me Be Lonely"	The Band Perry	
February 8	"Drink a Beer"	Luke Bryan	
February 15	"Drink a Beer"	Luke Bryan	
February 22	"Drink a Beer"	Luke Bryan	
March 1	"Drink a Beer"	Luke Bryan	
March 8	"When She Says Baby"	Jason Aldean	
March 15	"When She Says Baby"	Jason Aldean	
March 22	"Doin' What She Likes"	Blake Shelton	
March 29	"Doin' What She Likes"	Blake Shelton	
April 5	"Doin' What She Likes"	Blake Shelton	
April 12	"Doin' What She Likes"	Blake Shelton	
April 19	"Give Me Back My Hometown"	Eric Church	
April 26	"Give Me Back My Hometown"	Eric Church	
May 3	"Drink to That All Night"	Jerrod Niemann	
May 10	"Drink to That All Night"	Jerrod Niemann	
May 17	"Automatic"	Miranda Lambert	
May 24	"Play It Again"	Luke Bryan	
May 31	"Play It Again"	Luke Bryan	
June 7	"Automatic"	Miranda Lambert	
June 14	"Play It Again"	Luke Bryan	
June 21	"Play It Again"	Luke Bryan	
June 28	"Play It Again"	Luke Bryan	
July 5	"My Eyes"	Blake Shelton featuring Gwen Sebastian	
July 12	"My Eyes"	Blake Shelton featuring Gwen Sebastian	
July 19	"My Eyes"	Blake Shelton featuring Gwen Sebastian	
July 26	"Beachin'"	Jake Owen	
August 2	"Yeah"	Joe Nichols	
August 9	"Yeah"	Joe Nichols	
August 16	"Bartender"	Lady Antebellum	
August 23	"Meanwhile Back at Mama's"	Tim McGraw featuring Faith Hill	
August 30	"Bartender"	Lady Antebellum	
September 6	"Bartender"	Lady Antebellum	
September 13	"American Kids"	Kenny Chesney	
September 20	"Dirt"	Florida Georgia Line	
September 27	"Dirt"	Florida Georgia Line	
October 4	"Roller Coaster"	Luke Bryan	
October 11	"Roller Coaster"	Luke Bryan	
October 18	"Neon Light"	Blake Shelton	
October 25	"Neon Light"	Blake Shelton	
November 1	"Neon Light"	Blake Shelton	
November 8	"Neon Light"	Blake Shelton	
November 15	"Leave the Night On"	Sam Hunt	
November 22	"Leave the Night On"	Sam Hunt	
November 29	"Day Drinking"	Little Big Town	
December 6	"Shotgun Rider"	Tim McGraw	
December 13	"Shotgun Rider"	Tim McGraw	
December 20	"Perfect Storm"	Brad Paisley	
December 27	"Perfect Storm"	Brad Paisley	

== See also ==
- 2014 in music
- List of number-one country singles of 2014 (U.S.)
