= Dirt Road Diaries Tour =

2013 concert tour by Luke Bryan

- Tour by Luke Bryan
- Promotional poster for the tour
- Associated album: Spring Break…Here to Party; Crash My Party
- Start date: January 17, 2013
- End date: October 26, 2013
- Legs: 2
- No. of shows: 55
- Box office: $16,024,642

Luke Bryan concert chronology
- Farm Tour 2012 (2012); Dirt Road Diaries Tour (2013); That's My Kind of Night Tour (2014–15)

The Dirt Road Diaries Tour was a headlining tour by American country music artist Luke Bryan, in support of his EP Spring Break…Here to Party and his fourth studio album Crash My Party (2013). It began on January 17, 2013 in Evansville, Indiana and finished on October 26, 2013 in West Palm Beach, Florida.

== Background ==
In October 2012 the tour was announced. About the tour Bryan says, "I can feel the momentum. It has been an interesting process, and I'm so glad it didn't happen three or four years ago because I wouldn't have enjoyed it. I would be freaking out!" "I have dreamed about this day for a very long time. We are having the best time putting together all the bells and whistles for the tour. I have spent a lot of time out on tours with some really great artists, and each night we have tried to learn from them. I couldn't be more excited about this!"

== Opening acts ==
- Thompson Square
- Florida Georgia Line

== Setlist ==
1. "Kiss Tomorrow Goodbye"
2. "Country Man"
3. "Someone Else Calling You Baby"
4. "Rain Is a Good Thing"
5. "Crash My Party"
6. "That's My Kind of Night"
7. "Muckalee Creek Water"
8. "Suntan City"
9. "If You Ain't Here to Party"
10. "One More Night" (Maroon 5 cover)
11. "Locked Out of Heaven" (Bruno Mars cover)
12. "Too Damn Young"
13. "Dirt Road Diary"
14. "Drink a Beer"
15. "Do I"
16. "The Only Way I Know"
17. "Drinkin' Beer and Wastin' Bullets"
18. "Drunk on You"
19. "Enter Sandman" (Metallica cover)/"All My Friends Say"

Encore

18. "I Don't Want This Night to End"
19. "Dynamite" (Taio Cruz cover)
20. "Country Girl (Shake It for Me)"

== Tour dates ==
Date	City	Country	Venue	Opening acts
North America Leg 1
January 17, 2013	Evansville	United States	Ford Center	Thompson Square; Florida Georgia Line
January 18, 2013	Huntsville	United States	Von Braun Center	Thompson Square; Florida Georgia Line
January 19, 2013	Southaven	United States	Lander's Center	Thompson Square; Florida Georgia Line
January 25, 2013	Estero	United States	Germain Arena	Thompson Square; Florida Georgia Line
January 26, 2013	Orlando	United States	Amway Center	Thompson Square; Florida Georgia Line
February 7, 2013	Uniondale	United States	Nassau Veterans Memorial Coliseum	Thompson Square; Florida Georgia Line
February 8, 2013	State College	United States	Bryce Jordan Center	Thompson Square; Florida Georgia Line
February 15, 2013	Toledo	United States	Huntington Center	Thompson Square; Florida Georgia Line
February 16, 2013	Grand Rapids	United States	Van Andel Arena	Thompson Square; Florida Georgia Line
February 17, 2013	Bloomington	United States	U.S. Cellular Coliseum	Thompson Square; Florida Georgia Line
February 21, 2013	Fort Wayne	United States	Allen County War Memorial Coliseum	Thompson Square; Florida Georgia Line
February 22, 2013	Louisville	United States	KFC Yum! Center	Thompson Square; Florida Georgia Line
February 23, 2013	Columbia	United States	Mizzou Arena	Thompson Square; Florida Georgia Line
February 28, 2013	Ashwaubenon	United States	Resch Center	Thompson Square; Florida Georgia Line
March 1, 2013	Sioux City	United States	Tyson Events Center	Thompson Square; Florida Georgia Line
March 2, 2013	Moline	United States	iWireless Center	Thompson Square; Florida Georgia Line
March 14, 2013	Orange Beach	United States	Amphitheater at the Wharf	Thompson Square; Florida Georgia Line
March 21, 2013	Florence	United States	Florence Civic Center	Thompson Square; Florida Georgia Line
March 22, 2013	Fayetteville	United States	Cumberland County Crown Coliseum	Thompson Square; Florida Georgia Line
March 23, 2013	Charlottesville	United States	John Paul Jones Arena	Thompson Square; Florida Georgia Line
North America Leg 2
May 17, 2013	Virginia Beach	United States	Farm Bureau Live	Thompson Square; Florida Georgia Line
May 18, 2013	Bristow	United States	Jiffy Lube Live	Thompson Square; Florida Georgia Line
May 30, 2013	Hopewell	United States	CMAC	Thompson Square; Florida Georgia Line
May 31, 2013	Hartford	United States	Comcast Theatre	Thompson Square; Florida Georgia Line
June 1, 2013	Camden	United States	Susquehanna Bank Center	Thompson Square; Florida Georgia Line
June 2, 2013	Mansfield	United States	Comcast Center	Thompson Square; Florida Georgia Line
June 13, 2013	Peoria	United States	Peoria Civic Center	Thompson Square; Florida Georgia Line
June 14, 2013	Maryland Heights	United States	Verizon Wireless Amphitheater	Thompson Square; Florida Georgia Line
June 15, 2013	Tinley Park	United States	First Midwest Bank Amphitheatre	Thompson Square; Florida Georgia Line
July 11, 2013	Pelham	United States	Oak Mountain Amphitheatre	Thompson Square; Florida Georgia Line
July 12, 2013	Charlotte	United States	Verizon Wireless Amphitheatre	Thompson Square; Florida Georgia Line
July 13, 2013	Raleigh	United States	Time Warner Cable Music Pavilion	Thompson Square; Florida Georgia Line
July 14, 2013	Atlanta	United States	Aaron's Amphitheatre	Thompson Square; Florida Georgia Line
July 20, 2013	Brooklyn	United States	Faster Horses Festival	Thompson Square; Florida Georgia Line
July 21, 2013	Noblesville	United States	Klipsch Music Center	Thompson Square; Florida Georgia Line
July 26, 2013	Albuquerque	United States	Isleta Amphitheater	Thompson Square; Florida Georgia Line
July 27, 2013	Phoenix	United States	Ak-Chin Pavilion	Thompson Square; Florida Georgia Line
August 8, 2013	Wheatland	United States	Sleep Train Amphitheatre	Thompson Square; Florida Georgia Line
August 9, 2013	Mountain View	United States	Shoreline Amphitheatre	Thompson Square; Florida Georgia Line
August 10, 2013	Irvine	United States	Verizon Wireless Amphitheatre	Thompson Square; Florida Georgia Line
August 11, 2013	Chula Vista	United States	Sleep Train Amphitheatre	Thompson Square; Florida Georgia Line
August 23, 2013	Bethel	United States	Bethel Woods Center for the Arts	Thompson Square; Florida Georgia Line
August 24, 2013	Holmdel	United States	PNC Bank Arts Center	Thompson Square; Florida Georgia Line
August 25, 2013	Saratoga Springs	United States	Saratoga Performing Arts Center	Thompson Square; Florida Georgia Line
August 30. 2013	Allentown	United States	Allentown Fairgrounds	Thompson Square; Florida Georgia Line
September 12, 2013	Wichita	United States	Intrust Bank Arena	Thompson Square; Florida Georgia Line
September 14, 2013	Tulsa	United States	BOK Center	Thompson Square; Florida Georgia Line
September 20, 2013	West Valley City	United States	USANA Amphitheatre	Thompson Square; Florida Georgia Line
September 21, 2013	Greenwood Village	United States	Fiddler's Green Amphitheatre	Thompson Square; Florida Georgia Line
September 25, 2013	Cincinnati	United States	Riverbend Music Center	Thompson Square; Florida Georgia Line
September 27, 2013	Cuyahoga Falls	United States	Blossom Music Center	Thompson Square; Florida Georgia Line
September 28, 2013	Burgettstown	United States	First Niagara Pavilion	Thompson Square; Florida Georgia Line
October 17, 2013	North Little Rock	United States	Verizon Arena	Thompson Square; Florida Georgia Line
October 18, 2013	Nashville	United States	Bridgestone Arena	Thompson Square; Florida Georgia Line
October 19, 2013	Lexington	United States	Rupp Arena	Thompson Square; Florida Georgia Line
October 25, 2013	Tampa	United States	MidFlorida Credit Union Amphitheatre	Thompson Square; Florida Georgia Line
October 26, 2013	West Palm Beach	United States	Cruzan Amphitheatre	Thompson Square; Florida Georgia Line

== Box office score data ==
Venue	City	Attendance	Gross revenue
Ford Center	Evansville	9,415 / 9,415 (100%)	$418,778
Von Braun Center	Huntsville	7,175 / 7,175 (100%)	$340,980
Landers Center	Southaven	9,145 / 9,145 (100%)	$430,641
Germain Arena	Estero	6,527 / 6,527 (100%)	$319,890
Florence Civic Center	Florence	7,139 / 7,139 (100%)	$335,928
Tyson Events Center	Sioux City	7,742 / 7,742 (100%)	$370,785
Delaware State Fair	Harrington	9,093 / 9,093 (100%)	$392,217
West Virginia University Coliseum	Morgantown	9,090 / 9,090 (100%)	$393,877
Huntington Center	Toledo	8,097 / 8,097 (100%)	$401,021
Resch Center	Green Bay	8,403 / 8,403 (100%)	$401,159
Crown Coliseum	Fayetteville	9,100 / 9,100 (100%)	$432,992
Charleston Civic Center	Charleston	9,618 / 9,618 (100%)	$468,634
Peoria Civic Center	Peoria	9,865 / 9,865 (100%)	$481,028
Oak Mountain Amphitheatre	Pelham	10,391 / 10,391 (100%)	$495,465
Mizzou Arena	Columbia	10,888 / 10,888 (100%)	$519,862
Isleta Amphitheater	Albuquerque	15,028 / 15,067 (99%)	$533,050
INTRUST Bank Arena	Wichita	11,769 / 11,838 (99%)	$578,436
Bethel Woods Center for the Arts	Bethel	16,020 / 17,515 (92%)	$590,107
John Paul Jones Arena	Charlottesville	12,575 / 12,575 (100%)	$591,846
PNC Bank Arts Center	Holmdel	17,043 / 17,054 (100%)	$599,280
CMAC Performing Arts Center	Canandaigua	14,214 / 14,214 (100%)	$599,499
Fiddler's Green Amphitheatre	Greenwood Village	16,962 / 16,962 (100%)	$603,917
Bryce Jordan Center	University Park	12,743 / 12,743 (100%)	$604,582
BOK Center	Tulsa	12,443 / 12,443 (100%)	$607,378
Time Warner Cable Music Pavilion	Raleigh	19,980 / 19,980 (100%)	$613,822
Verizon Wireless Amphitheater	Charlotte	18,806 / 18,806 (100%)	$629,362
Verizon Wireless Amphitheater	Irvine	14,944 / 14,944 (100%)	$635,008
Farm Bureau Live at Virginia Beach	Virginia Beach	19,840 / 19,840 (100%)	$649,456
Riverbend Music Center	Cincinnati	20,476 / 20,476 (100%)	$658,292
U.S. Cellular Coliseum	Bloomington	13,960 / 14,116 (99%)	$659,737
Aaron's Amphitheatre	Atlanta	18,965 / 18,965 (100%)	$667,613
TOTAL		387,456 / 389,226 (99%)	$16,024,642
