= List of Billboard number-one country songs of 2014 =

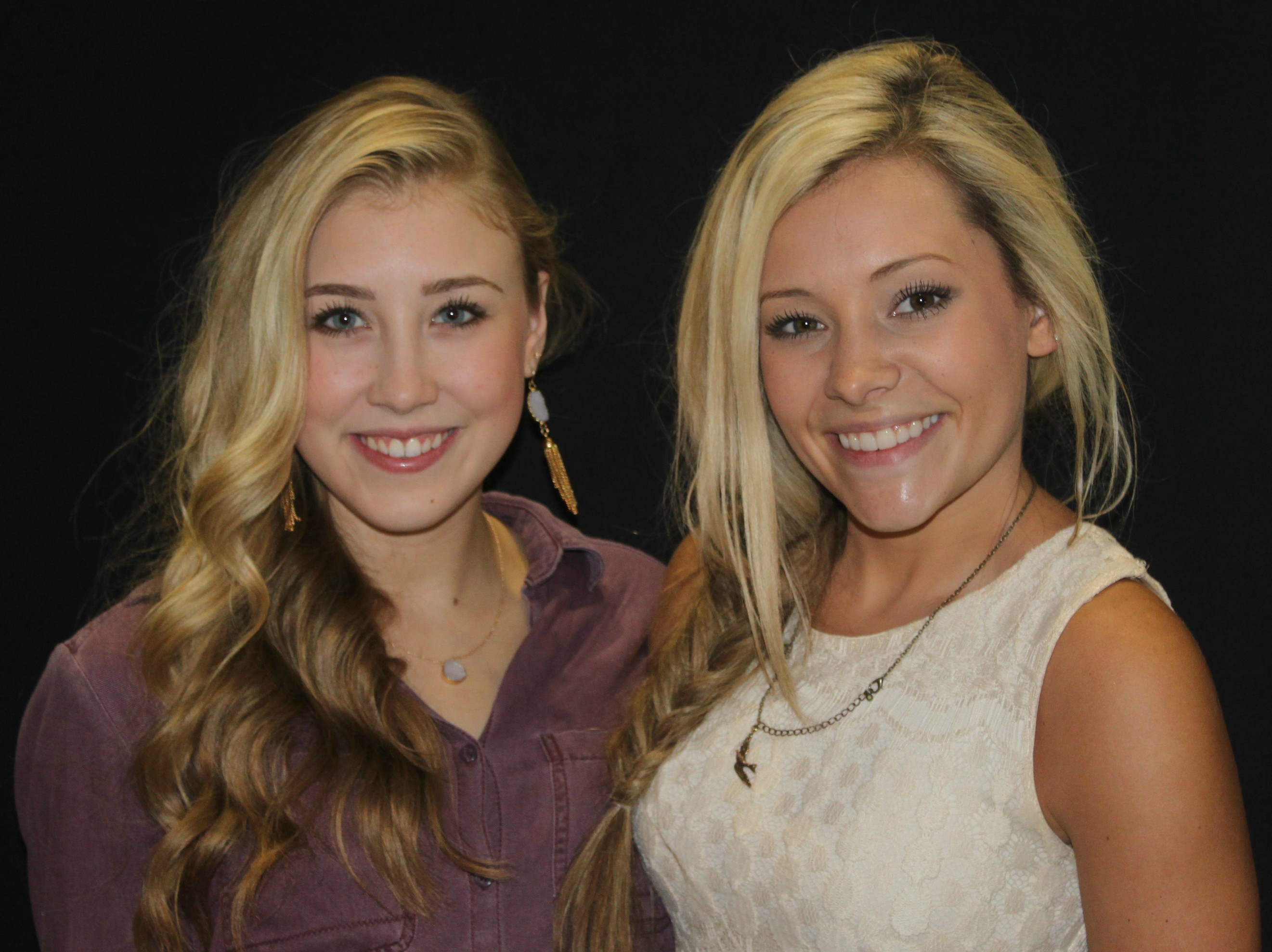
Maddie & Tae achieved their first number-one single when they topped the Country Airplay chart with "Girl in a Country Song", a response to the prevalent bro-country style.

Hot Country Songs and Country Airplay are charts that rank the top-performing country music songs in the United States, published by Billboard magazine. Hot Country Songs ranks songs based on digital downloads, streaming, and airplay not only from country stations but from stations of all formats, a methodology introduced in 2012. Country Airplay, which was published for the first time in 2012, is based solely on country radio airplay, a methodology which had previously been used for several decades for Hot Country Songs. In 2014, 13 different songs topped the Hot Country Songs chart and 35 different songs topped Country Airplay in 52 issues of the magazine.

Jason Aldean had the longest unbroken run at number one on the Hot Country Songs, spending 14 consecutive weeks in the top spot with "Burnin' It Down". Luke Bryan spent the most total weeks at number one during the year, however. His songs "Drink a Beer" and "Play It Again" totaled 14 weeks atop the chart and he spent a further 6 weeks in the top spot as a featured vocalist on Florida Georgia Line's chart-topper "This Is How We Roll" for a total of 20 weeks at number one. Bryan and Florida Georgia Line were the acts with the most number ones during 2014, as each act had two chart-toppers in addition to their collaboration on "This Is How We Roll". No other act had more than one number one during the year. Bryan also spent the most weeks at number one on the Country Airplay listing, but with a much smaller total of seven weeks. This figure included a run of four consecutive weeks with "Play It Again", which tied with Florida Georgia Line's "Stay" for the longest unbroken run at the top of the radio-based chart during 2014. Bryan and Florida Georgia Line were both associated with bro-country, an emerging subgenre which incorporated elements from hip hop music and emphasized lyrics about partying, drinking, and attractive young women. Blake Shelton had the most chart-toppers on the airplay listing, reaching the top spot with "Doin' What She Likes", "Neon Light" and "My Eyes".

Several acts gained their first number ones during 2014, including Sam Hunt, whose "Leave the Night On" topped both charts in the same week in November. Singer Cole Swindell reached the top of the Hot Country Songs listing with his debut single, "Chillin' It". Frankie Ballard achieved his first career number one when he reached the peak position on Country Airplay with "Helluva Life", and went on to gain his second number one on the same chart later in the year with "Sunshine & Whiskey". Gwen Sebastian, a former contestant on the second season of TV's The Voice, was a first-time chart-topper when she was featured on the song "My Eyes" by Blake Shelton, who had coached her on the show. "Where It's At" gave Dustin Lynch his first appearance at number one in September, and teenaged female duo Maddie & Tae gained their first number-one single in December with "Girl in a Country Song", a retort to bro-country, and in particular the depiction of women in the style's lyrics.

== Chart history ==
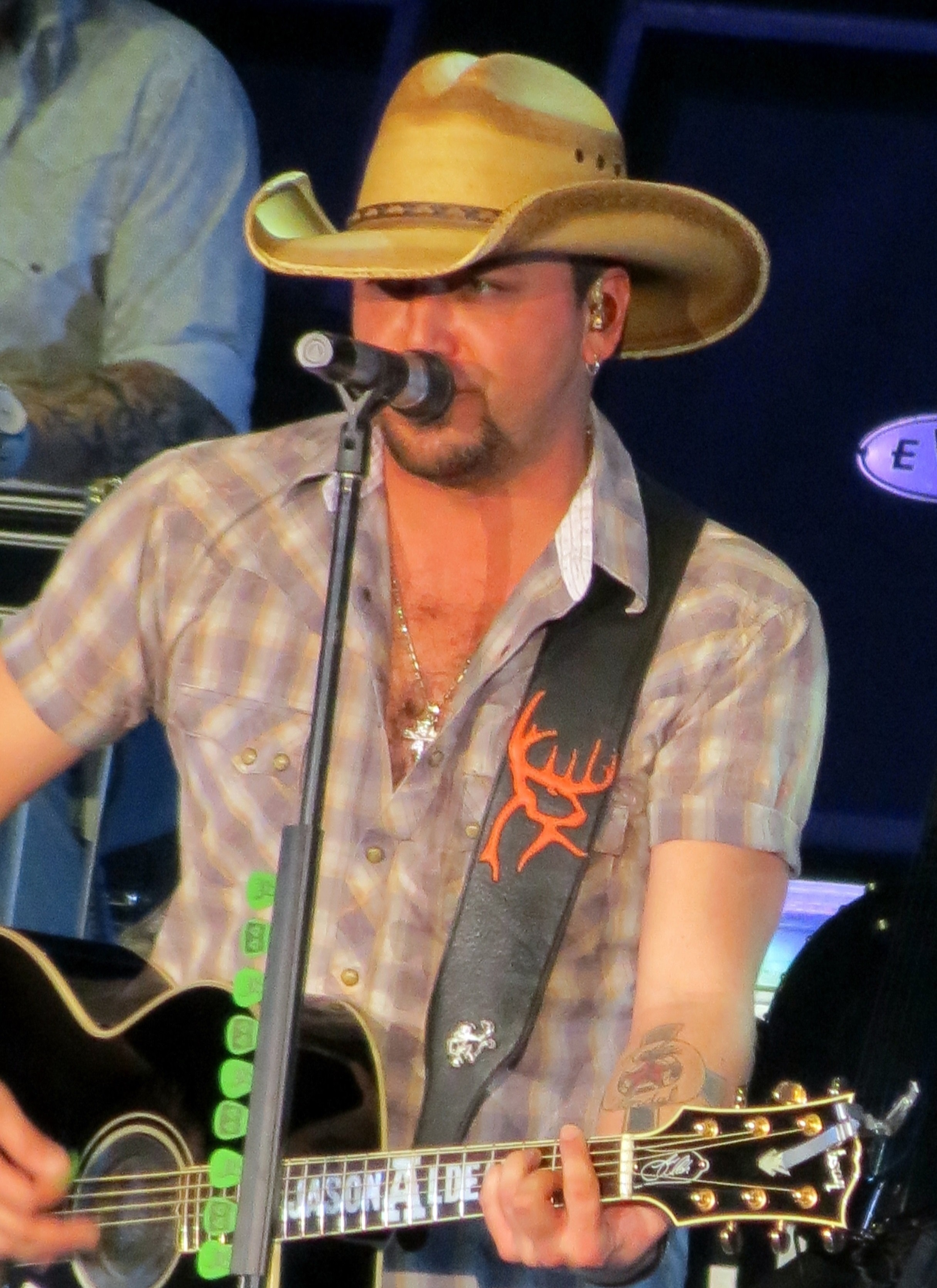
Jason Aldean's "Burnin' It Down" spent 14 consecutive weeks at number one.

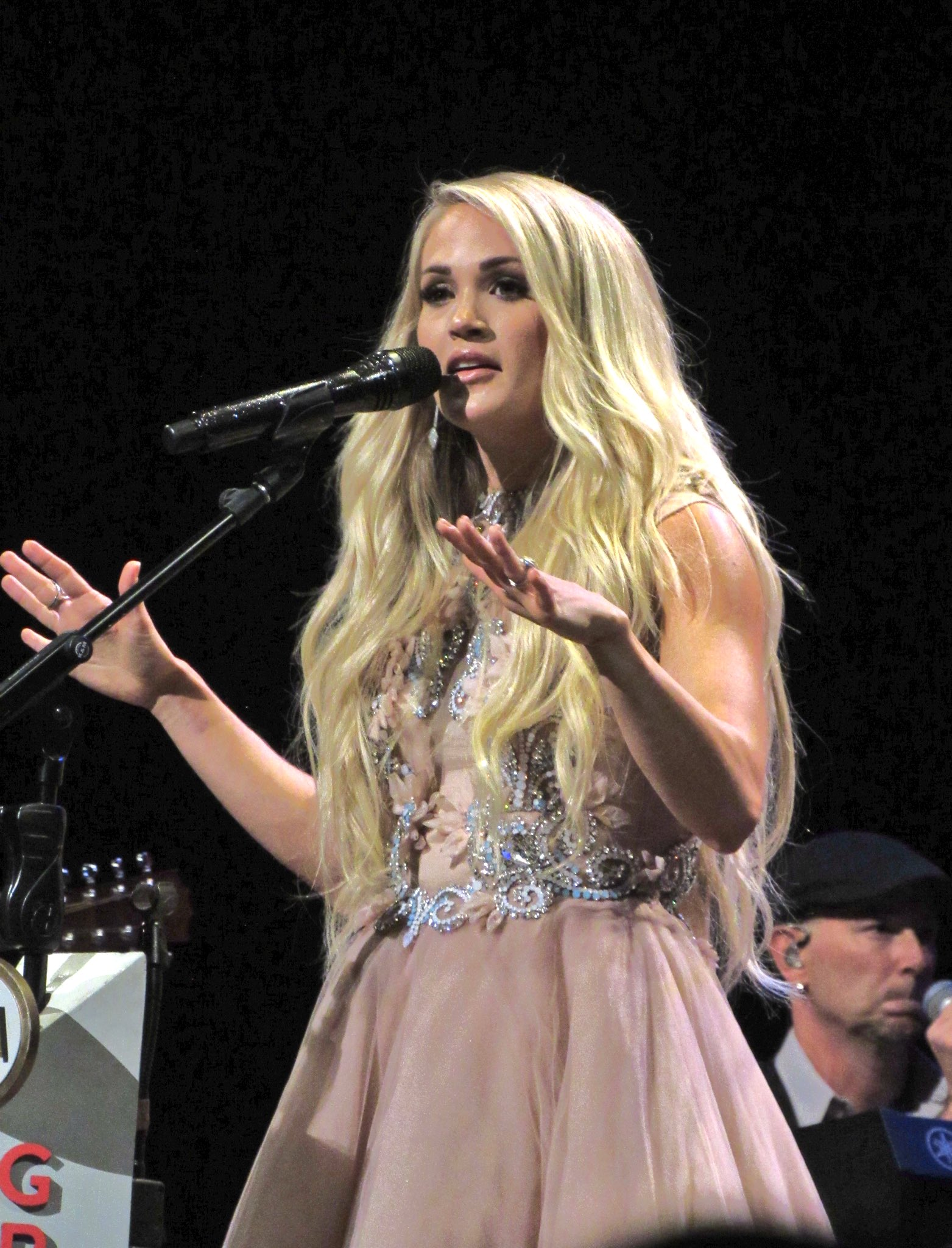
Carrie Underwood topped the chart in December with "Something in the Water".

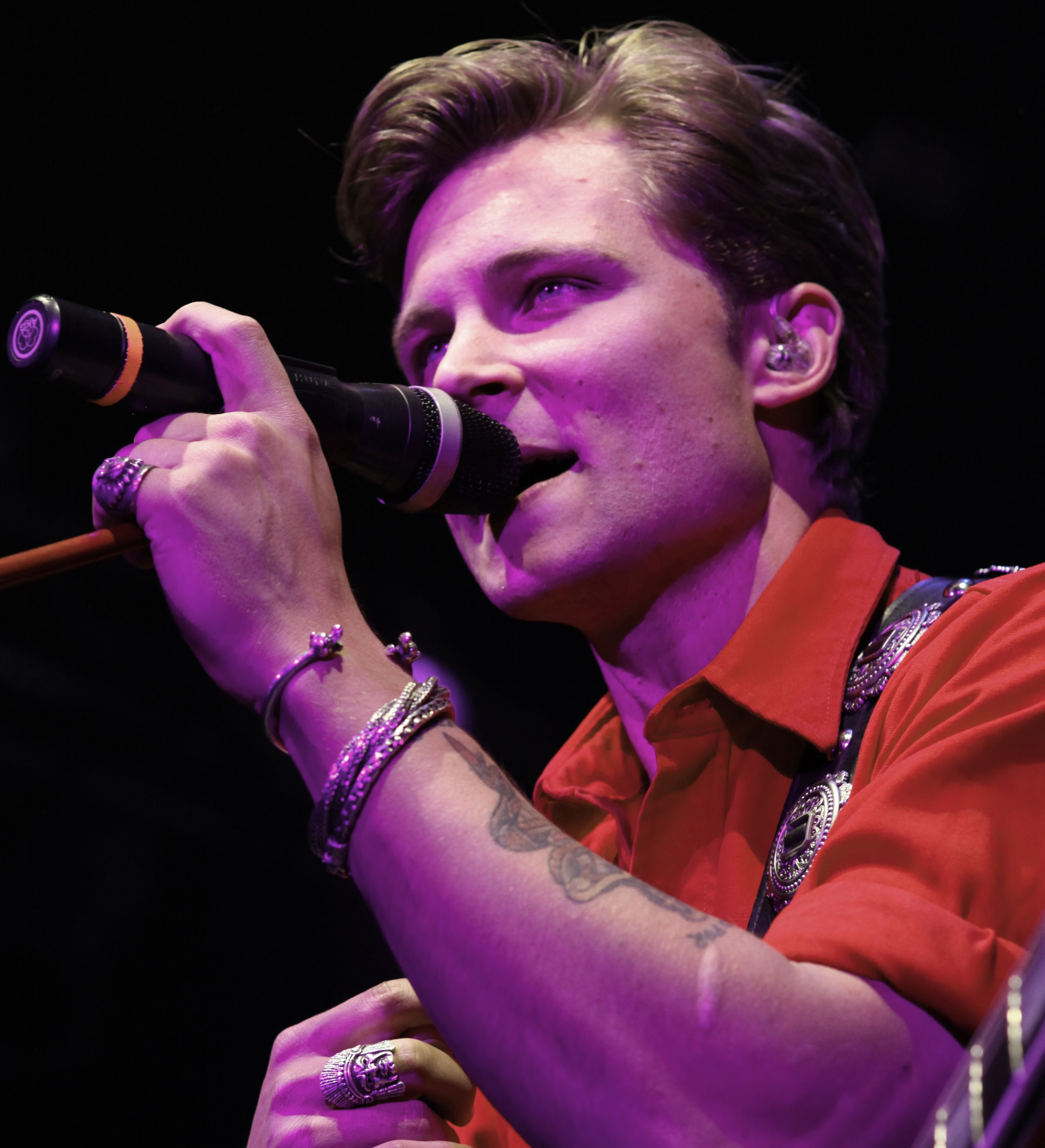
Frankie Ballard had two number ones on the airplay chart.

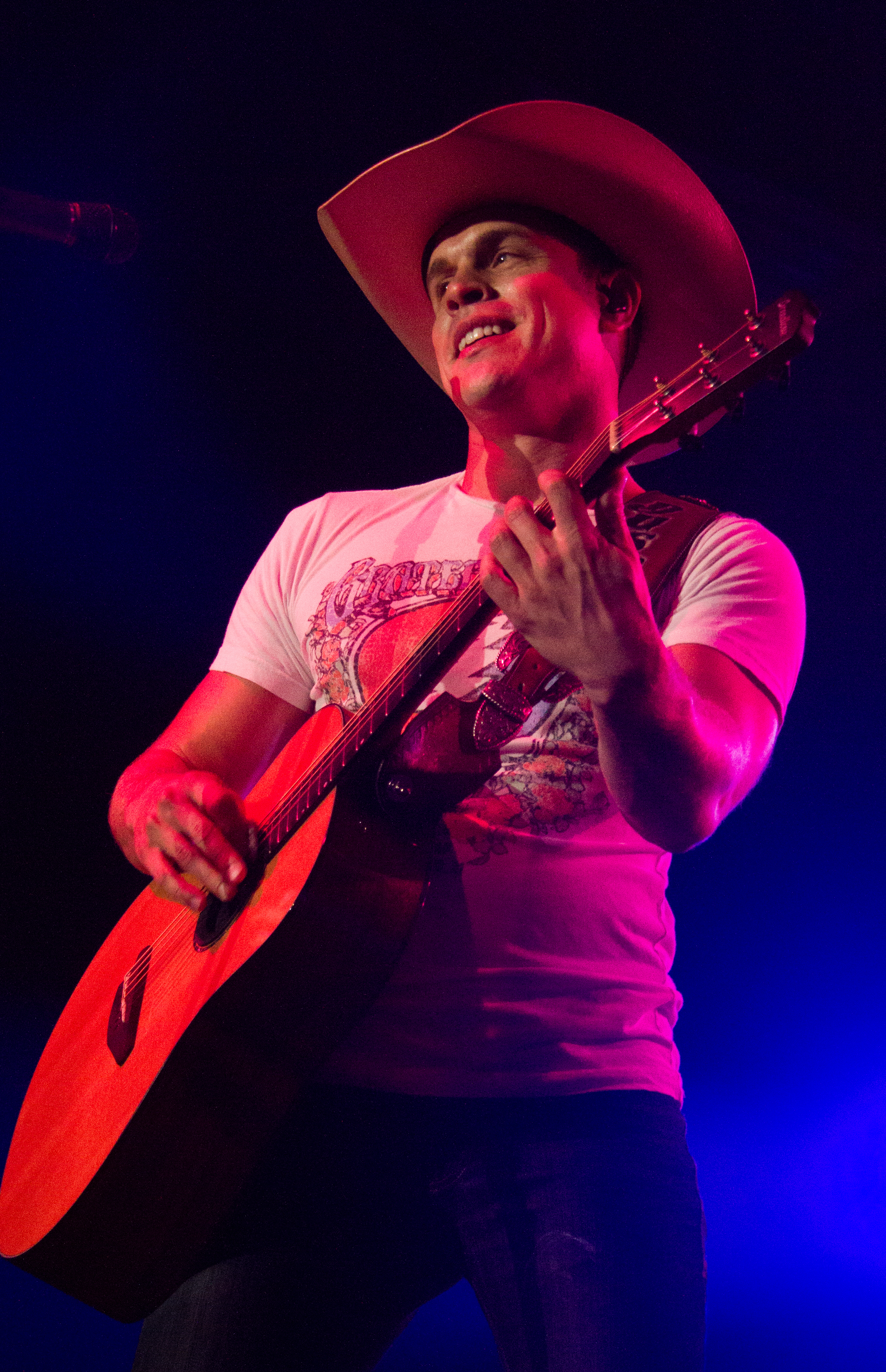
Dustin Lynch achieved his first number one with "Where It's At".

Chart history
Issue date	Hot Country Songs			Country Airplay		
Issue date	Title	Artist(s)	Ref.	Title	Artist(s)	Ref.
January 4	"Stay"	Florida Georgia Line		"Stay"	Florida Georgia Line	
January 11	"Stay"	Florida Georgia Line		"Stay"	Florida Georgia Line	
January 18	"Stay"	Florida Georgia Line		"Stay"	Florida Georgia Line	
January 25	"Drink a Beer"	Luke Bryan		"Stay"	Florida Georgia Line	
February 1	"Drink a Beer"	Luke Bryan		"Sweet Annie"	Zac Brown Band	
February 8	"Drink a Beer"	Luke Bryan		"Whatever She's Got"	David Nail	
February 15	"Drink a Beer"	Luke Bryan		"Drink a Beer"	Luke Bryan	
February 22	"Drink a Beer"	Luke Bryan		"Drink a Beer"	Luke Bryan	
March 1	"Chillin' It"	Cole Swindell		"When She Says Baby"	Jason Aldean	
March 8	"Chillin' It"	Cole Swindell		"When She Says Baby"	Jason Aldean	
March 15	"Bottoms Up"	Brantley Gilbert		"When She Says Baby"	Jason Aldean	
March 22	"Bottoms Up"	Brantley Gilbert		"Compass"	Lady Antebellum	
March 29	"This Is How We Roll"	Florida Georgia Line featuring Luke Bryan		"Helluva Life"	Frankie Ballard	
April 5	"This Is How We Roll"	Florida Georgia Line featuring Luke Bryan		"I Hold On"	Dierks Bentley	
April 12	"This Is How We Roll"	Florida Georgia Line featuring Luke Bryan		"Doin' What She Likes"	Blake Shelton	
April 19	"This Is How We Roll"	Florida Georgia Line featuring Luke Bryan		"Doin' What She Likes"	Blake Shelton	
April 26	"Play It Again"	Luke Bryan		"Drink to That All Night"	Jerrod Niemann	
May 3	"Play It Again"	Luke Bryan		"Drink to That All Night"	Jerrod Niemann	
May 10	"Play It Again"	Luke Bryan		"Bottoms Up"	Brantley Gilbert	
May 17	"Play It Again"	Luke Bryan		"Give Me Back My Hometown"	Eric Church	
May 24	"Play It Again"	Luke Bryan		"Get Me Some of That"	Thomas Rhett	
May 31	"Play It Again"	Luke Bryan		"Play It Again"	Luke Bryan	
June 7	"Play It Again"	Luke Bryan		"Play It Again"	Luke Bryan	
June 14	"Play It Again"	Luke Bryan		"Play It Again"	Luke Bryan	
June 21	"This Is How We Roll"	Florida Georgia Line featuring Luke Bryan		"Play It Again"	Luke Bryan	
June 28	"This Is How We Roll"	Florida Georgia Line featuring Luke Bryan		"Beat of the Music"	Brett Eldredge	
July 5	"Play It Again"	Luke Bryan		"Lettin' the Night Roll"	Justin Moore	
July 12	"Somethin' Bad"	Miranda Lambert duet with Carrie Underwood		"My Eyes"	Blake Shelton featuring Gwen Sebastian	
July 19	"Beachin'"	Jake Owen		"Beachin'"	Jake Owen	
July 26	"Dirt"	Florida Georgia Line		"Yeah"	Joe Nichols	
August 2	"Dirt"	Florida Georgia Line		"Yeah"	Joe Nichols	
August 9	"Burnin' It Down"	Jason Aldean		"Yeah"	Joe Nichols	
August 16	"Burnin' It Down"	Jason Aldean		"We Are Tonight"	Billy Currington	
August 23	"Burnin' It Down"	Jason Aldean		"I Don't Dance"	Lee Brice	
August 30	"Burnin' It Down"	Jason Aldean		"Drunk on a Plane"	Dierks Bentley	
September 6	"Burnin' It Down"	Jason Aldean		"Drunk on a Plane"	Dierks Bentley	
September 13	"Burnin' It Down"	Jason Aldean		"Bartender"	Lady Antebellum	
September 20	"Burnin' It Down"	Jason Aldean		"American Kids"	Kenny Chesney	
September 27	"Burnin' It Down"	Jason Aldean		"Where It's At"	Dustin Lynch	
October 4	"Burnin' It Down"	Jason Aldean		"Where It's At"	Dustin Lynch	
October 11	"Burnin' It Down"	Jason Aldean		"Hope You Get Lonely Tonight"	Cole Swindell	
October 18	"Burnin' It Down"	Jason Aldean		"Roller Coaster"	Luke Bryan	
October 25	"Burnin' It Down"	Jason Aldean		"Dirt"	Florida Georgia Line	
November 1	"Burnin' It Down"	Jason Aldean		"Burnin' It Down"	Jason Aldean	
November 8	"Burnin' It Down"	Jason Aldean		"Burnin' It Down"	Jason Aldean	
November 15	"Leave the Night On"	Sam Hunt		"Leave the Night On"	Sam Hunt	
November 22	"Something in the Water"	Carrie Underwood		"Neon Light"	Blake Shelton	
November 29	"Something in the Water"	Carrie Underwood		"Sunshine & Whiskey"	Frankie Ballard	
December 6	"Something in the Water"	Carrie Underwood		"Somewhere in My Car"	Keith Urban	
December 13	"Shotgun Rider"	Tim McGraw		"Somewhere in My Car"	Keith Urban	
December 20	"Shotgun Rider"	Tim McGraw		"Girl in a Country Song"	Maddie & Tae	
December 27	"Shotgun Rider"	Tim McGraw		"Shotgun Rider"	Tim McGraw	

== See also ==
- 2014 in music
- List of artists who reached number one on the U.S. country chart
- List of Top Country Albums number ones of 2014
- List of number-one country singles of 2014 (Canada)
