= Kick the Dust Up =

Single by Luke Bryan

Single by Luke Bryan

from the album Kill the Lights
- Released: May 19, 2015
- Recorded: 2015
- Genre: Country-rock
- Length: 3:10 (original version)
- Label: Capitol Nashville
- Songwriters: Dallas Davidson; Chris DeStefano; Ashley Gorley
- Producers: Jeff Stevens; Jody Stevens

Luke Bryan singles chronology
"I See You" (2014)	"Kick the Dust Up" (2015)	"Strip It Down" (2015)

"Kick the Dust Up" is a song written by Ashley Gorley, Dallas Davidson, and Chris DeStefano and recorded by American country music artist Luke Bryan. It was released in May 2015 as the first single from Bryan's 2015 album, Kill the Lights. It is also Bryan's thirteenth number one single, and his tenth consecutive charttopper.

== Release ==
Bryan had been playing the song live during the last leg of his That's My Kind of Night Tour and Kick the Dust Up tour. He officially announced the song on May 19, 2015, along with his new album while appearing on The Ellen DeGeneres Show.

== Critical reception ==
Shortly after its release, Brian Mansfield of USA Today called the song the song of the week, saying the song "is an all-night party thumper for people who feel penned in by crowded bars with expensive drinks, and need some room to dance — even if it means having to watch where they step."

Other reviews of the song, however, were more negative. Grady Smith of The Guardian gave the song a less favorable review, comparing it to his previous single "That's My Kind of Night," saying it "follows the same derivative party-in-a-cornfield formula that so many other country songs have trodden in the past decade, despite outcry against the glut of dime-a-dozen tailgate tunes. Really, that’s no surprise given that it’s the brainchild of Dallas Davidson, Ashley Gorley and Chris DeStefano – the exact same writers behind "That’s My Kind of Night"." Smith went further to say "There is so little to say about "Kick the Dust Up" because it's hardly a song. It's just a collection of trite phrases about back roads and alcohol that data researchers have determined country consumers are used to hearing on the radio and are thus amenable to hearing again." Kevin John Coyne of Country Universe gave the song an "F", stating that, while he kinda likes Luke Bryan, he "still hated this song before the first twenty seconds were up." He also said that "I keep thinking that there’s no new way to do this same old theme of partying down in the cornfields. Perhaps there’s just no new way to do it well. I’m struggling to remember any of the old ways they did it well, either."

== Commercial performance ==
"Kick the Dust Up" debuted on the Hot Country Songs chart at number 49 the week before its official release. It was the best-selling country music song of the week when it was released for sale, debuting as number one on the Country Digital Songs chart with 127,000 copies sold. It rose to number one on both the Hot Country Songs and Country Airplay charts, and number 26 on the Billboard Hot 100 chart. It reached over a million in sales by November 2015. As of January 2016, the song has sold 1,090,000 copies in the US. It was certified 4× Platinum by Recording Industry Association of America (RIAA) in September 2024.

In Canada, the song rose to a peak position of number one on the Canada Country chart and 15 on the Canadian Hot 100 chart. The song was also Bryan's first entry on the Australian Singles Chart, spending one week at number 98.

== Charts ==
=== Weekly charts ===
Chart (2015)	Peak position
Australia (ARIA)	98
Canada Hot 100 (Billboard)	15
Canada Country (Billboard)	1
US Billboard Hot 100	26
US Country Airplay (Billboard)	1
US Hot Country Songs (Billboard)	1

=== Year-end charts ===
Chart (2015)	Position
Canada (Canadian Hot 100)	89
Canada Country (Billboard)	32
US Billboard Hot 100	87
US Country Airplay (Billboard)	57
US Hot Country Songs (Billboard)	4

== Certifications and sales ==
Region	Certification	Certified units/sales
United States (RIAA)	4× Platinum	4,000,000^{‡}
^{‡} Sales+streaming figures based on certification alone.
