= Here's to the Good Times =

Studio album by Florida Georgia Line
- Released: December 4, 2012
- Recorded: 2011–12
- Studios: County Q (Nashville); Big Loud Mountain Studios (Nashville); The Racket Room (Santa Ana, California)
- Genre: Country
- Length: 40:00
- Labels: Republic Nashville; Big Loud Mountain
- Producer: Joey Moi

Florida Georgia Line chronology
| It'z Just What We Do (2012) | Here's to the Good Times (2012) | Anything Goes (2014) |

Singles from Here's to the Good Times
- 1. "Cruise" Released: August 6, 2012; 2. "Get Your Shine On" Released: January 21, 2013; 3. "Round Here" Released: June 3, 2013; 4. "Stay" Released: October 7, 2013

"Here's to the Good Times... This Is How We Roll"
- Cover for deluxe album.

Singles from Here's to the Good Times... This Is How We Roll
- 1. "This Is How We Roll" Released: February 10, 2014

Here's to the Good Times is the debut studio album by American country music duo Florida Georgia Line. It was released on December 4, 2012, by Republic Nashville. The album includes the five tracks from their It'z Just What We Do EP, along with six new songs. The deluxe edition, titled Here's to the Good Times… This Is How We Roll, was released on November 25, 2013. The album was the sixth best-selling album of 2013 in the United States, and became certified two-times platinum by the Recording Industry Association of America (RIAA) on July 1, 2014. An expanded edition of the deluxe album released on May 9, 2025.

== Critical reception ==
Professional ratings
Review scores
| Source | Rating |
|---|---|
| About.com | 3.5/5 stars |
| Allmusic | 3.5/5 stars |
| Music Is My Oxygen Weekly | 4/5 stars |
| Roughstock | 4.5/5 stars |
| Taste of Country | 2.5/5 stars |

Here's to the Good Times has received generally positive reviews by music critics. Robert Silva of About.com found that the album "may not be built to last, but it's built to be blast." Allmusic's Steve Leggett told that the release is "based on summer energy, drinking beer, taking shots, driving back roads, and the romantic glories and possibilities of Friday and Saturday nights with nothing to do but look for those good times." At Music Is My Oxygen Weekly, Rob Burkhardt evoked that "Here’s To the Good Times is only going to add to Florida Georgia Line’s rapidly growing popularity." Matt Bjorke of Roughstock praised the album because "is chock full of hits", and said that "it's the work of a band who not only has captured an audience seemingly overnight but also has the potential to be the biggest duo in Country Music".

== Commercial performance ==
The album debuted at No. 3 on the Billboard Top Country Albums, and No. 10 on the Billboard 200 with 63,000 copies sold in the United States. The album eventually reached No. 1 on the Top Country Albums chart in June 2013.

The album was the sixth best-selling album of 2013 in the United States, with 1,350,000 copies sold for the year. The album was certified double Platinum by the RIAA on July 1, 2014, and reached its 2 million sales mark in August 2014. As of April 2017, the album has sold 2,367,400 copies in the US.

== Track listing ==
| No. | Title | Writer(s) | Length |
|---|---|---|---|
| 1. | "Cruise" | Tyler Hubbard; Brian Kelley; Joey Moi; Chase Rice; Jesse Rice | 3:28 |
| 2. | "Round Here" | Rodney Clawson; Chris Tompkins; Thomas Rhett | 3:35 |
| 3. | "Get Your Shine On" | Hubbard; Kelley; Clawson; Tompkins | 3:42 |
| 4. | "Here's to the Good Times" | Clawson; Tompkins; Lynn Hutton | 4:10 |
| 5. | "It'z Just What We Do" | Hubbard; Kelley; Clawson | 3:38 |
| 6. | "Stay" | Moi; John Fred Young; Chris Robertson; Jon Lawhon; Ben Wells | 3:19 |
| 7. | "Hell Raisin' Heat of the Summer" | Clawson; Tompkins; Craig Wiseman | 3:33 |
| 8. | "Tell Me How You Like It" | Hubbard; Kelley; Tompkins | 3:46 |
| 9. | "Tip It Back" | Hubbard; Kelley; Clawson | 3:44 |
| 10. | "Dayum, Baby" (featuring Sarah Buxton) | Hubbard; Kelley; Clawson; David Lee Murphy | 3:25 |
| 11. | "Party People" (featuring Jaren Johnston) | Luke Laird; Shane McAnally; J. T. Harding | 3:39 |
| Total length: | | | 40:00 |

This Is How We Roll
| No. | Title | Writer(s) | Length |
|---|---|---|---|
| 12. | "This Is How We Roll" (featuring Luke Bryan) | Kelley; Hubbard; Cole Swindell; Luke Bryan | 3:40 |
| 13. | "Take It Out on Me" | McAnally; Chris DeStefano; Ashley Gorley | 3:29 |
| 14. | "People Back Home" | Kelley; Hubbard; Ryan Tyndell; Brent Anderson | 4:02 |
| 15. | "Headphones" | Kelley; Hubbard; Jimmy Robbins; Nicolle Galyon | 3:44 |
| 16. | "Hands on You" | Tompkins; Clawson; Brett James | 3:11 |
| 17. | "Cruise (Remix)" (featuring Nelly) | Hubbard; Kelley; Moi; Rice; Rice; Cornell Haynes Jr. | 3:28 |

Target exclusive bonus tracks
| No. | Title | Writer(s) | Length |
|---|---|---|---|
| 12. | "What Are You Drinking About" | Hubbard; Kelley; Wiseman | 3:39 |
| 13. | "Country In My Soul" | Hubbard; Kelley; Jennifer Zuffinetti | 3:28 |

iTunes deluxe edition bonus tracks
| No. | Title | Writer(s) | Length |
|---|---|---|---|
| 12. | "Cruise" (Live from Joe's Bar, Chicago 2012) | Hubbard; Kelley; Moi; C. Rice; J. Rice | 3:52 |
| 13. | "Round Here" (Live from Joe's Bar, Chicago 2012) | Clawson; Tompkins; Rhett | 4:05 |
| 14. | "Tip It Back" (Live from Joe's Bar, Chicago 2012) | Hubbard; Kelley; Clawson | 3:48 |
| 15. | "Cruise" (Music Video) | | 3:32 |
| 16. | "Round Here" (Live from Joe's Bar, Chicago 2012 Video) | | 4:05 |
| 17. | "Tip It Back" (Live from Joe's Bar, Chicago 2012 Video) | | 3:48 |

Expanded edition bonus tracks
| No. | Title | Writer(s) | Length |
|---|---|---|---|
| 17. | "What Are You Drinking About" | Hubbard; Kelley; Wiseman | 3:39 |
| 18. | "Country In My Soul" | Hubbard; Kelley; Jennifer Zuffinetti | 3:28 |
| 19. | "Cruise (Remix)" (featuring Nelly) | Hubbard; Kelley; Moi; Rice; Rice; Cornell Haynes Jr. | 3:28 |
| 20. | "This Is How We Roll (Remix)" (featuring Jason Derulo & Luke Bryan) | Kelley; Hubbard; Swindell; Bryan | 3:27 |
| 21. | "Round Here" (Acoustic) | Clawson; Tompkins; Rhett | 3:24 |
| 22. | "Stay" (Acoustic) | Moi; Young; Robertson; Lawhon; Wells | 3:14 |
| 23. | "Get Your Shine On" (Acoustic) | Hubbard; Kelley; Clawson; Tompkins | 3:23 |
| 24. | "Cruise" (Acoustic) | Hubbard; Kelley; Moi; C. Rice; J. Rice | 3:14 |
| 25. | "This Is How We Roll" (Acoustic) (featuring Luke Bryan) | Kelley; Hubbard; Swindell; Bryan | 3:37 |
| 26. | "Tip It Back" (Live from Joe's Bar, Chicago 2012) | Hubbard; Kelley; Clawson | 3:48 |
| 27. | "Round Here" (Live from Joe's Bar, Chicago 2012) | Clawson; Tompkins; Rhett | 4:05 |
| 28. | "Cruise" (Live from Joe's Bar, Chicago 2012) | Hubbard; Kelley; Moi; C. Rice; J. Rice | 3:52 |

- The Target bonus tracks were also included on the Target edition of Here's to the Good Times... This Is How We Roll as tracks 18 and 19.

== Personnel ==
Florida Georgia Line

- Tyler Hubbard - vocals
- Brian Kelley - vocals

Additional Musicians

- Tom Beaupre - bass guitar
- Brian Bonds - electric guitar
- Sarah Buxton - duet vocals on "Dayum, Baby"
- Scott Cooke - bass guitar
- Wes Hightower - background vocals
- Jaren Johnston - background vocals on "Party People"
- Charlie Judge - keyboards
- Joey Moi - acoustic guitar, electric guitar, programming, background vocals
- Russ Pahl - pedal steel guitar
- Mike Rojas - keyboards
- Jason Schmidt - percussion
- Adam Shoenfeld - electric guitar
- Jimmie Lee Sloas - bass guitar
- Chris Tompkins - keyboards
- Ilya Toshinsky - banjo, dobro, acoustic guitar, electric guitar, baritone guitar, mandolin
- Ryan Vikedal - percussion
- John Willis - talk box guitar

== Chart performance ==
=== Album ===
Weekly charts

| Chart (2012–2016) | Peak position |
|---|---|
| Australian Albums (ARIA) | 65 |
| Canadian Albums (Billboard) | 8 |
| US Billboard 200 | 4 |
| US Top Country Albums (Billboard) | 1 |

Year-end charts

| Chart (2013) | Position |
|---|---|
| US Billboard 200 | 7 |
| US Top Country Albums (Billboard) | 2 |

| Chart (2014) | Position |
|---|---|
| US Billboard 200 | 10 |
| US Top Country Albums (Billboard) | 3 |

| Chart (2015) | Position |
|---|---|
| US Billboard 200 | 61 |

| Chart (2017) | Position |
|---|---|
| US Billboard 200 | 180 |
| US Top Country Albums (Billboard) | 29 |

| Chart (2018) | Position |
|---|---|
| US Top Country Albums (Billboard) | 25 |

| Chart (2019) | Position |
|---|---|
| US Top Country Albums (Billboard) | 26 |

| Chart (2020) | Position |
|---|---|
| US Top Country Albums (Billboard) | 31 |

| Chart (2021) | Position |
|---|---|
| US Top Country Albums (Billboard) | 42 |

| Chart (2022) | Position |
|---|---|
| US Top Country Albums (Billboard) | 49 |

Decade-end charts

| Chart (2010–2019) | Position |
|---|---|
| US Billboard 200 | 21 |

=== Singles ===
| Year | Single | Peak chart positions | | | | | | |
| Year | Single | US Country | US Country Airplay | US | US Pop | US Adult | CAN Country | CAN |
|---|---|---|---|---|---|---|---|---|
| 2012 | "Cruise" | 1 | 1 | 4 | 7 | 9 | 1 | 38 |
| 2013 | "Get Your Shine On" | 5 | 1 | 27 | — | — | 1 | 39 |
| 2013 | "Round Here" | 3 | 1 | 28 | — | — | 1 | 47 |
| 2013 | "Stay" | 1 | 1 | 28 | — | — | 1 | 39 |
| 2014 | "This Is How We Roll" | 1 | 2 | 15 | 25 | 24 | 2 | 20 |
"—" denotes releases that did not chart

=== Certifications ===
| Region | Certification | Certified units/sales |
|---|---|---|
| Canada (Music Canada) | Platinum | 80,000^{^} |
| United States (RIAA) | 2× Platinum | 2,367,400 |
^{^} Shipments figures based on certification alone.

=== Other charted songs ===
| Year | Title | Peak chart positions | | |
| Year | Title | US Country | US | CAN |
|---|---|---|---|---|
| 2012 | "Here's to the Good Times" | 33 | - | 84 |
| 2013 | "Dayum, Baby" (with Sarah Buxton) | 49 | - | - |
| 2013 | "Take It Out on Me" | 32 | 125 | 84 |
| 2013 | "Hands on You" | 33 | - | - |
| 2013 | "Tip It Back" | 35 | 133 | 92 |
| 2013 | "Headphones" | 39 | - | - |
| 2013 | "People Back Home" | 42 | - | - |
| 2014 | "It'z Just What We Do" | 48 | - | - |
| 2014 | "Tell Me How You Like It" | 22 | - | - |
| 2014 | "Party People" | 48 | 36 | - |
"—" denotes releases that did not chart
