= I See You (Luke Bryan song) =

Single by Luke Bryan

from the album Crash My Party
- Released: November 3, 2014
- Recorded: 2013
- Genre: Country rock
- Length: 3:08
- Label: Capitol Nashville
- Songwriter(s): Luke Bryan; Ashley Gorley; Luke Laird
- Producer(s): Jeff Stevens

Luke Bryan singles chronology
"Roller Coaster" (2014)	"I See You" (2014)	"Kick the Dust Up" (2015)

"I See You" is a song co-written and recorded by American country music artist Luke Bryan. It was released in November 2014 as the sixth and final single from his 2013 album Crash My Party. Bryan wrote this song with Ashley Gorley and Luke Laird.

== Content and conception ==
Bryan wrote the song with Ashley Gorley and Luke Laird. The four had never written together before, but after writing "A Little Bit Later On", which appeared on Bryan's Spring Break 4...Suntan City EP, they felt that they had developed a chemistry and continued to write. Gorley suggested the idea for "I See You" after Laird and Bryan had developed a melody. Gorley said that "It was a little bit of a ghost idea, where even though she's gone, he sees her everywhere he goes…It's not a brand new concept necessarily, but just the way we put it, mixed with the flow of the song, we thought it was interesting." The song is about a man who attempts to forget the memory of a former lover by hanging out with friends, but saying that he can still see his lover and is unable to forget her.

== Critical reception ==
Country music blog Taste of Country reviewed the song favorably, saying that it was "an oft-told but welcome story" and "The mid-tempo lost love song opens with a heavy guitar, but sonically, it quickly falls back to what fans know and love about Bryan. Haters may call it predictable, but familiarity has always played well in the format."

== Chart performance ==
The song has sold 581,000 copies in the US as of August 2015.

Chart (2014–2015)	Peak position
Canada (Canadian Hot 100)	51
Canada Country (Billboard)	1
US Billboard Hot 100	41
US Country Airplay (Billboard)	1
US Hot Country Songs (Billboard)	1

=== Year-end charts ===
Chart (2015)	Position
US Country Airplay (Billboard)	34
US Hot Country Songs (Billboard)	18

== Certifications ==
Region	Certification	Certified units/sales
United States (RIAA)	Platinum	1,000,000^{‡}
^{‡} Sales+streaming figures based on certification alone.
