= Crash My Party =

Studio album by Luke Bryan
- Released: August 13, 2013
- Studios: Ocean Way Nashville, Blackbird Studio and Starstruck Studios (Nashville, Tennessee)
- Genre: Country
- Length: 44:32
- Label: Capitol Records Nashville
- Producer: Jeff Stevens

Luke Bryan chronology
Tailgates & Tanlines (2011)	Crash My Party (2013)	Kill the Lights (2015)

Singles from Crash My Party
- 1. "Crash My Party" Released: April 7, 2013; 2. "That's My Kind of Night" Released: August 5, 2013; 3. "Drink a Beer" Released: November 11, 2013; 4. "Play It Again" Released: March 24, 2014; 5. "Roller Coaster" Released: July 14, 2014; 6. "I See You" Released: November 3, 2014

Crash My Party is the fourth studio album by American country music artist Luke Bryan. It was released on August 13, 2013 by Capitol Records Nashville. Its first single, the title track, reached number one on the Billboard Country Airplay chart. The album was produced by Jeff Stevens. A deluxe edition with four bonus tracks is available digitally or by exclusive Target and Walmart CDs.

Even though the reception towards the album by music critics was mixed, the album has seen remarkably high commercial success. On its first week, the album sold 528,000 copies and debuted at number one on both the Billboard 200, Bryan's first album to do so on that chart, and Top Country Albums charts. It was certified Platinum by the RIAA on September 30, 2013, and became the third best-selling album of 2013. By July 2014, the album had reached over 2 million in sales in the United States.

== Critical reception ==
Professional ratings
Aggregate scores
Source	Rating
Metacritic	56/100
Review scores
Source	Rating
AllMusic	2.5/5 stars
American Songwriter	3/5 stars
Country Weekly	B−
HitFix	B−
Music Is My Oxygen	2.5/5 stars
Newsday	B
The Oakland Press	3/4 stars
Rolling Stone	2.5/5 stars
Roughstock	4/5 stars
Taste of Country	3.5/5 stars
USA Today	2.5/4 stars

Crash My Party garnered mixed reception from music critics. At Metacritic, they assign a weighted average score to ratings and reviews from selected mainstream critics, which based upon six reviews, the album has a Metascore of 56.

At Rolling Stone, Chuck Eddy felt that "Given the drinking songs he's best at, he'd be better off pretending spring break lasts all year long" because he cannot seem to match up to "Kenny Chesney's knack for lonely contemplation." Stephen Thomas Erlewine at AllMusic told that some of the tracks "seem slightly cookie-cutter", yet at the same time "he does seem savvy," and "somebody who embraces what real redneck living is about in 2013." At The Boston Globe, Sarah Rodman gave the album a mixed review, and wrote that the album sounds somewhat generic "But the majority of the record is given over to 'Party' games we've heard Bryan [...] and many others in contemporary country [...] play before." Eric Allen of American Songwriter noted how "Crash My Party is melodiously rewarding despite its sporadic lyrical missteps." At Music Is My Oxygen, Rob Burkhardt felt that Bryan "chose to coast on that momentum" from his previous album.

At USA Today, Jerry Shriver highlighted that in comparison to his last album this has a "slightly more generic-sounding" tone, and he wrote that Bryan "comes across as just another backwoods party animal with an amped-up sound and indiscriminate taste in women." At The Oakland Press, Gary Graff felt that the release was yet "another mostly upbeat and good-humored set, which, more than anything else, demonstrates Bryan's and producer Jeff Stevens' knack for picking out exactly the right songs for the singer to record." Melinda Newman of HitFix alluded to how the release "will be a nice new chapter in a pleasingly familiar book, if not a particularly high-octane one." At Country Weekly, Joseph Hudak told that "All the imagery his fans have come to demand is there", however "In the future, it'd be nice to see Luke, the reigning ACM Entertainer of the Year, grow out of the fields he's so clearly comfortable in."

Billy Dukes of Taste of Country felt that "there is little to differentiate the two projects", which this may lead some people to "line up to pigeonhole him", and noted that "There are hits to be found on his fourth studio album, but a lack of powerful album cuts makes the project much less exciting than one would like." At Newsday, Glenn Gamboa called Bryan "a singles hitter [...] in more ways than one", which means that he felt "Bryan never hits a home run, but he sure does connect a lot." They also continue on to say that "every time he tries to swing for the fences, he strikes out." Matt Bjorke of Roughstock evoked that "Crash My Party clearly features melodies and ideas that come from outside of Country's traditions, nobody would mistake the album for anything but a Country Music album, a strong, well-made modern one which makes times to nod to tradition while still looking forward."

== Commercial performance ==
Crash My Party sold over 528,000 copies during its first week of release. In 2013, it became the fourth best-selling album in its debut week, with the only albums to achieve better first week sales being Justin Timberlake's The 20/20 Experience, Eminem's The Marshall Mathers LP 2, Jay Z's Magna Carta... Holy Grail, and Drake's Nothing Was the Same. Any album by a male country music artist has not been sold this well in nine years. For the week of August 31, 2013, the album reached number one on both the Billboard 200 and Top Country Albums charts. As a result, this became Bryan's second number one album that year. The album's title track climbed the charts and reached number 2 on Hot Country Songs. The next week, the album broke the record for the largest second-week percentage sales drop for a number-one debuting album of the Nielsen SoundScan era.

Crash My Party became the third best-selling album of 2013 in the United States with over 1,521,000 copies sold that year. In 2014, the album sold an additional 754,000 copies, and it reached its two million sales mark in July 2014. In May 2015, the album surpassed the total in sales of Bryan's previous album (2011's Tailgates & Tanlines) to become his best-selling album to date. As of July 2017, the album has sold over 2.7 million copies in the United States.

== Track listing ==
No.	Title	Writer(s)	Length
1.	"That's My Kind of Night"	Dallas Davidson; Chris DeStefano; Ashley Gorley	3:10
2.	"Beer in the Headlights"	Michael Carter; Brandon Kinney; Cole Swindell	2:52
3.	"Crash My Party"	Rodney Clawson; Gorley	3:54
4.	"Roller Coaster"	Carter; Swindell	4:19
5.	"We Run This Town"	Gorley; Davidson; Kelley Lovelace	3:14
6.	"Drink a Beer"	Jim Beavers; Chris Stapleton	3:23
7.	"I See You"	Luke Bryan; Gorley; Luke Laird	3:06
8.	"Goodbye Girl"	Shane McAnally; Josh Osborne; Matthew Ramsey	2:39
9.	"Play It Again"	Davidson; Gorley	3:47
10.	"Blood Brothers"	Brett James; Bobby Pinson	4:03
11.	"Out Like That"	Aaron Goodvin; Adam Sanders; Swindell	3:18
12.	"Shut It Down"	Tony Martin; Wendell Mobley; Neil Thrasher	3:16
13.	"Dirt Road Diary"	Rhett Akins; Bryan; Davidson; Ben Hayslip	3:31
Total length:			44:32

Deluxe Edition
No.	Title	Writer(s)	Length
14.	"What Is It with You"	Bryan; Shane Minor; Jeff Stevens	4:00
15.	"Sunburnt Lips"	Thomas Rhett; Lee Brice; Rob Hatch; Lance Miller	3:25
16.	"Better Than My Heart"	Bryan; Jeff Stevens; Lonnie Wilson	3:44
17.	"Your Mama Should've Named You Whiskey"	Laird; Jeremy Spillman; T. Rhett	3:42
Total length:			59:23

International Tour Edition
No.	Title	Writer(s)	Length
18.	"She Get Me High"	Bryan; Jeff Stevens; Jody Stevens	3:37
19.	"Good Lookin' Girl"	Bryan; Carter; Jim McCormick	3:43
Total length:			1:06:43

== Personnel ==
- Luke Bryan – lead vocals
- Charlie Judge – synthesizers
- Mike Rojas – acoustic piano, Fender Rhodes, Hammond B3 organ, synthesizers
- Jody Stevens – programming
- Tom Bukovac – acoustic guitar, electric guitar
- J. T. Corenflos – electric guitar, Ebow guitar
- Kenny Greenberg – electric guitar, Ebow guitar
- Ilya Toshinsky – acoustic guitar, ganjo
- Mike Johnson – pedal steel guitar
- Russ Pahl – pedal steel guitar
- Joe Spivey – bouzouki, fiddle
- Mike Brignardello – bass
- Jimmie Lee Sloas – bass
- Shannon Forrest – drums
- Greg Morrow – drums
- Eric Darken – percussion
- Perry Coleman – backing vocals
- Tania Hancheroff – backing vocals
- Chris Stapleton – backing vocals (6)
- Jenifer Wrinkle – backing vocals

=== Production ===
- Jeff Stevens – producer
- Derek Bason – recording, mixing
- Mills Logan – additional recording
- Chris Small – recording assistant
- Adam Ayan – mastering at Gateway Mastering (Portland, Maine)
- Scott Johnson – production assistant
- Joanna Carter – art direction
- Karen Naff – art direction
- Craig Allen – design
- Joseph LIanes – photography
- Kristin Barlowe – photography (page 5)
- Paula Turner – hair, make-up
- Lee Moore – wardrobe stylist
- Kerri Edwards and KPentertainment – management
- Red Light Management – management

== Charts ==
=== Weekly charts ===
Chart (2013–15)	Peak position
Australian Albums (ARIA)	19
Australian Country Albums (ARIA)	4
Canadian Albums (Billboard)	1
US Billboard 200	1
US Top Country Albums (Billboard)	1

=== Year-end charts ===
Chart (2013)	Position
Australian Country Albums (ARIA)	21
Canadian Albums (Billboard)	22
US Billboard 200	9
US Top Country Albums (Billboard)	3
Chart (2014)	Position
Australian Country Albums (ARIA)	17
Canadian Albums (Billboard)	17
US Billboard 200	7
US Top Country Albums (Billboard)	1
Chart (2015)	Position
Australian Country Albums (ARIA)	15
US Billboard 200	36
US Top Country Albums (Billboard)	11
Chart (2016)	Position
Australian Country Albums (ARIA)	29
Chart (2017)	Position
Australian Country Albums (ARIA)	31
US Billboard 200	173
US Top Country Albums (Billboard)	28
Chart (2018)	Position
Australian Country Albums (ARIA)	27
US Top Country Albums (Billboard)	27
Chart (2019)	Position
Australian Country Albums (ARIA)	30
US Top Country Albums (Billboard)	29
Chart (2020)	Position
Australian Country Albums (ARIA)	33
US Top Country Albums (Billboard)	34
Chart (2021)	Position
Australian Country Albums (ARIA)	32
US Top Country Albums (Billboard)	48
Chart (2022)	Position
US Top Country Albums (Billboard)	40

=== Decade-end charts ===
Chart (2010–2019)	Position
US Billboard 200	25

=== Singles ===
Year	Single	Peak chart positions				
Year	Single	US Hot Country	US Country Airplay	US	CAN Country	CAN
2013	"Crash My Party"	2	1	18	1	18
2013	"That's My Kind of Night"	1	2	15	2	19
2013	"Drink a Beer"	1	1	31	1	34
2014	"Play It Again"	1	1	14	1	20
2014	"Roller Coaster"	5	1	43	1	56
2014	"I See You"	1	1	41	1	51

== Certifications ==
Region	Certification	Certified units/sales
Canada (Music Canada)	2× Platinum	160,000^{^}
United States (RIAA)	6× Platinum	6,000,000^{‡}
^{^} Shipments figures based on certification alone.^{‡} Sales+streaming figures based on certification alone.
