= This Is How We Roll =

2014 single by Florida Georgia Line

Single by Florida Georgia Line featuring Jason Derulo and Luke Bryan

from the album Here's to the Good Times... This Is How We Roll
- Released: February 10, 2014
- Recorded: 2013
- Genre: Country rap
- Length: 3:40
- Label: Republic Nashville
- Songwriters: Tyler Hubbard; Brian Kelley; Cole Swindell; Luke Bryan
- Producer: Joey Moi

Florida Georgia Line singles chronology
"The South" (2013)	"This Is How We Roll" (2014)	"Dirt" (2014)

Luke Bryan singles chronology
"Drink a Beer" (2013)	"This Is How We Roll" (2014)	"Play It Again" (2014)

Alternate cover
- Cover for the remix featuring Jason Derulo

Music video
- "This Is How We Roll" on YouTube

"This Is How We Roll" is a song recorded by American country music duo Florida Georgia Line with fellow country music singer Luke Bryan. It is the fifth and final single from Florida Georgia Line's debut studio album, Here's to the Good Times, although it is only included on the 2013 This Is How We Roll re-release. Cole Swindell assisted the artists in writing the song. A remix, featuring Jason Derulo and Bryan was released on June 7, 2014.

== Critical reception ==
In a review of the album's rerelease, Matt Bjorke of Roughstock wrote that it is a "song which is definitely well within the musical pocket each of the song's writers have in their music and an obvious choice for single at some point. It's another sing-a-long, small town love type of song but does that matter at this point, it's a song that's all about feeling good with people you love to be with." Website Taste of Country also reviewed the song favorably, saying that "'Get Your Shine On,' 'Round Here' and 'Stay' have found success on country radio, but this track from the group's deluxe edition of 'Here's to the Good Times' is their best moment since 'Cruise.' They can get away with the rapping now, and having the stamp of approval from country's reigning ACM Entertainer of the Year certainly won't hurt."

== Music video ==
The music video was directed by Marc Klasfeld and premiered in March 2014.

A biker named Kenny loses a bet and has to jump a tree. He fails, resulting in his dirt bike being stuck in the tree. When he, Travis Pastrana and other men are found stranded by Hubbard, Kelley, and Bryan as a result of the failed dirt bike trick, Kelley invites them to a party in the back of their semi truck, which is revealed throughout the video to consist of dancing women and beer. The trio can be seen both inside and on top of the truck as it travels. Towards the end of the video, dirt bikers perform tricks as they fly over the trio, who are standing on solid ground.

== Commercial performance ==
The song first entered the Billboard Hot 100 chart at number 75, and at number 18 on the Hot Country Songs chart and sold 52,000 digital copies for the week when the deluxe version of the album, Here's To The Good Times...This Is How We Roll, was released on November 25, 2013. It reached number one on the Hot Country Songs chart for the week ending of March 28, 2014, and stayed at number one for four weeks. It also peaked on the Billboard Hot 100 chart at number 15 for the week ending of April 26, 2014. After it was released to radio, the song received significant airplay to enter the Country Airplay chart at number 25 for the week ending of March 1, 2014. It continued climbing the chart and peaked at number 2 in May 2014, behind Bryan's own "Play It Again", marking the first time in the chart's 24-year history that the same artist held the top two positions simultaneously.

The song reached its first million sales mark in April 2014, and its second in September 2014. It was certified Platinum by the RIAA on May 1, 2014, double Platinum on September 16, 2014, and quintuple Platinum on December 12, 2018. As of January 2015, the song has sold 2,276,000 copies in the US.

The song is featured in the video game WWE 2K15.

== Live performances ==
A mashup of the song with Jason Derulo's Talk Dirty was performed with Derulo at the 2014 CMA Awards.

== Charts ==
=== Weekly charts ===
Chart (2014)	Peak position
Canada Hot 100 (Billboard)	20
Canada CHR/Top 40 (Billboard)	46
Canada Country (Billboard)	2
US Billboard Hot 100	15
US Hot Country Songs (Billboard)	1
US Country Airplay (Billboard)	2
US Adult Pop Airplay (Billboard); Jason Derulo remix	23
US Pop Airplay (Billboard); Jason Derulo remix	25

=== Year-end charts ===
Chart (2014)	Position
Canada Canadian Hot 100	70
US Billboard Hot 100	49
US Country Airplay (Billboard)	22
US Hot Country Songs (Billboard)	1

=== Decade-end charts ===
Chart (2010–2019)	Position
US Hot Country Songs (Billboard)	16

== Certifications ==
Region	Certification	Certified units/sales
Australia (ARIA)	Platinum	70,000^{‡}
New Zealand (RMNZ)	Platinum	30,000^{‡}
United States (RIAA)	6× Platinum	2,276,000
^{‡} Sales+streaming figures based on certification alone.

== Release history ==
Country	Date	Format	Version	Record label
United States	February 10, 2014	Country radio	Original	Republic
United States	June 17, 2014	Contemporary hit radio	Jason Derulo remix	Republic

== See also ==
- List of number-one country singles of 2014 (U.S.)
