= Crash My Party (song) =

Single by Luke Bryan

from the album Crash My Party
- Released: April 7, 2013
- Recorded: 2013
- Genre: Country music
- Length: 3:54
- Label: Capitol Nashville
- Songwriters: Rodney Clawson; Ashley Gorley
- Producer: Jeff Stevens

Luke Bryan singles chronology
"The Only Way I Know" (2012)	"Crash My Party" (2013)	"That's My Kind of Night" (2013)

"Crash My Party" is a song written by Rodney Clawson and Ashley Gorley and recorded by American country music artist Luke Bryan. It was released in April 2013 as the first single and title track from Bryan's fourth studio album of the same name.

== History ==
Bryan debuted the song at the 48th Academy of Country Music Awards in April 2013, which he hosted with Blake Shelton.

== Critical reception ==
Billy Dukes of Taste of Country gave the single 2.5 stars out of 5, saying that "it's difficult to become excited about a song that's so familiar." Giving it 4 stars out of 5, Matt Bjorke of Roughstock said that "he keeps delivering the kind of song that's helped make him the superstar he rightfully is. Catchy arena-ready choruses, earnest verses and a melody that pulls from other genres".

== Music video ==
The music video was directed by Shaun Silva and premiered on Today on June 20, 2013.

== Commercial performance ==
"Crash My Party" debuted at number 28 on the U.S. Billboard Country Airplay chart for the week of April 27, 2013. It also debuted at number 35 on the U.S. Billboard Hot Country Songs chart for the week of April 20, 2013. It also debuted at number 18 on the U.S. Billboard Hot 100 chart for the week of April 27, 2013. It also debuted at number 18 on the Canadian Hot 100 chart for the week of April 27, 2013.

== Charts ==
=== Weekly charts ===
Chart (2013)	Peak position
Canada Hot 100 (Billboard)	18
Canada Country (Billboard)	1
US Billboard Hot 100	18
US Hot Country Songs (Billboard)	2
US Country Airplay (Billboard)	1

=== Year-end charts ===
Chart (2013)	Position
Canada Canadian Hot 100	96
US Billboard Hot 100	69
US Country Airplay (Billboard)	16
US Hot Country Songs (Billboard)	4

== Certifications ==
Region	Certification	Certified units/sales
Canada (Music Canada)	Platinum	80,000^{*}
United States (RIAA)	5× Platinum	5,000,000^{‡}
^{*} Sales figures based on certification alone.^{‡} Sales+streaming figures based on certification alone.
