= Roller Coaster (Luke Bryan song) =

Single by Luke Bryan

from the album Crash My Party
- Released: July 14, 2014
- Recorded: 2013
- Genre: Country pop; pop rock
- Length: 4:19
- Label: Capitol Nashville
- Songwriters: Michael Carter; Cole Swindell
- Producer: Jeff Stevens

Luke Bryan singles chronology
| "Play It Again" (2014) | "Roller Coaster" (2014) | "I See You" (2014) |

Music video
- "Roller Coaster" on YouTube

"Roller Coaster" is a song written by Michael Carter and Cole Swindell and recorded by American country music artist Luke Bryan. It was released in July 2014 as the fifth single from Bryan's 2013 album Crash My Party.

== Background and writing ==
Cole Swindell, who formerly sold merchandise for Bryan, wrote the song with Bryan's guitarist and bandleader, Michael Carter, on October 6, 2011, in Valdosta, Georgia. The inspiration for the song was the Miracle Strip Amusement Park in Panama City, Florida, a destination that Bryan, Swindell, and Carter had visited on summer vacations. Swindell and Carter recorded a demo for Bryan, which featured Swindell singing. Upon hearing the demo, Bryan thought that Swindell had the potential to get a record deal of his own; after Swindell became a recording artist himself, Carter produced his self-titled debut album. Swindell said that he considered the song "one of my favorite songs I've ever written" and "special" because of his and Carter's friendships with Bryan.

== Content ==
The song is a mid-tempo ballad about a man who encounters a woman while on vacation in Panama City. The first verse contains details specific to the area, such as Thomas Drive, a road near the former amusement park. In the song, the man befriends the woman, then states that "she's got [him] twisted like that old beach roller coaster" after she leaves. Swindell told Billboard, "Going down there, you always met a girl — like a day before you had to leave, you got up enough courage to finally talk to her, and then she's got to leave the next day."

Tom Roland of Billboard described the song as "smooth and understated" and "reflective [and] melancholy". Carter noted that the melody of the chorus repeats a single note because he wanted the song to be easily sung along with by fans. The original demo featured a cold open, but Bryan and his producer, Jeff Stevens, decided to create an intro because Bryan felt that "[s]tarting with a straight-in lyric, half the time you miss the lyrics." Stevens decided to "start it off with the easy beach feel and let it ride." The song features a bass guitar line performed by Jimmie Lee Sloas, and two backing vocal tracks both sung by session vocalist Perry Coleman. The song is set in the key of A♭ major with a moderate tempo and a primary chord pattern of A♭-E♭/G-F_{m}7-D♭ and a vocal range of D♭_{4}-F_{5}.

== Critical reception ==
Country music blog Taste of Country reviewed the song positively. The review contrasted it with "'Til Summer Comes Around" by Keith Urban in saying that it was more "positive" than that song, also saying that "The roller coaster metaphor is creative — it’s what separates this song from others that rely on an increasingly used country trope. Once again it’s Bryan’s natural charisma that lifts a lyric that wouldn’t work for someone less lovable. Little details like Thomas Drive feel personal. He’s becoming one of country’s top storytellers."

Billboard and American Songwriter ranked "Roller Coaster" at number six and number five, respectively, on their lists of the 10 greatest Luke Bryan songs.

== Music video ==
The official music video for "Roller Coaster" was directed by Michael Monaco and filmed in Panama City Beach, Florida in the spring of 2014 as part of spring break festivities. It premiered June 20, 2014.

== Chart performance ==
"Roller Coaster" debuted at No. 60 on the Billboard Country Airplay chart for the week ending July 5, 2014. The same week, "Roller Coaster" re-entered at No. 47 on the Billboard Hot Country Songs chart. For the week ending October 18, the song reached number one on the Billboard Country Airplay chart, making it Bryan's tenth number one hit. As of November 2014, the song had sold 583,000 copies in the US.

| Chart (2014) | Peak position |
|---|---|
| Canada Hot 100 (Billboard) | 56 |
| Canada Country (Billboard) | 1 |
| US Billboard Hot 100 | 43 |
| US Country Airplay (Billboard) | 1 |
| US Hot Country Songs (Billboard) | 5 |

=== Year-end charts ===
| Chart (2014) | Position |
|---|---|
| US Country Airplay (Billboard) | 26 |
| US Hot Country Songs (Billboard) | 19 |

== Certifications ==
| Region | Certification | Certified units/sales |
|---|---|---|
| United States (RIAA) | 2× Platinum | 2,000,000^{‡} |
^{‡} Sales+streaming figures based on certification alone.
