= That's My Kind of Night =

Single by Luke Bryan

from the album Crash My Party
- Released: August 5, 2013
- Recorded: 2013
- Genre: Country pop; country rock
- Length: 3:10
- Label: Capitol Nashville
- Songwriters: Dallas Davidson; Chris DeStefano; Ashley Gorley
- Producer: Jeff Stevens

Luke Bryan singles chronology
"Crash My Party" (2013)	"That's My Kind of Night" (2013)	"Drink a Beer" (2013)

"That's My Kind of Night" is a song written by Dallas Davidson, Chris DeStefano, and Ashley Gorley and recorded by American country music artist Luke Bryan. It was released in August 2013 as the second single from his fourth studio album Crash My Party (2013).

The track has been successful commercially, with "That's My Kind of Night" helping Bryan set a record as the first male country music artist to top the Billboard's Hot Country Songs and Top Country Albums charts simultaneously.

== Content and creation ==
In terms of the song's creation, co-songwriter Ashley Gorley has stated about working with Dallas Davidson and Chris DeStefano that:

"That was one of the most fun writing sessions of all time... I was clapping out a little beat. It’s something that nobody wants to see. It looks hilarious... more or less of a party vibe. We knew we wanted to make people feel good. We wanted to stretch the boundaries a little bit musically and... thought we had something special after the first few minutes of getting into that groove. We thought it was cool. We’re exceptionally proud when that one comes on. I’ve gone to the shows and seen people’s reaction to that. I think that’s a really country song in spite of whatever’s been said. I’m glad it hit as big as it did. Also no cowbell"

The song is an up-tempo track in which the male narrator describes an ideal night with his lover.

== Critical reception ==
The song received mixed to negative reviews from several critics. Billy Dukes of Taste of Country rated the song 2.5 stars out of 5, praising Bryan's performance of the song and describing the production of the song as "corny-cool." He also called it "an eye-roller from start to finish", but stated that "Bryan’s absolute commitment makes it tolerable, if not enjoyable in the right setting." Bob Paxman of Country Weekly gave the song a "C−" grade, saying that "it unfurls all the prerequisite clichés: jacked-up trucks, beer, getting your 'love on', and other assorted triteness", although he also said that it was "undeniably catchy and the record has some nice production touches, including the playful vocal." Ben Foster of Country Universe gave the song a "D−" grade, praising Bryan's vocal performance but added that "Unfortunately, it also has unabashedly dumb, mind-numbing lyrics that insult the history of the country genre and the intelligence of its fans, shamelessly recycling cliché after cliché right from the opening verse..."

In a September 2013 interview, Zac Brown stated that the song was "the worst song [he’s] ever heard." He later clarified on Twitter that he did not dislike Bryan as an artist. In Bryan's defense, artist Jason Aldean posted on Instagram, and one of the song's co-writers, Dallas Davidson, spoke out as well.

== Music videos ==
=== Tour music video ===
The tour music video was directed by Michael Monaco and premiered in August 2013.

=== Official music video ===
The official music video for "That's My Kinda Night" was premiered on September 13, 2013 on ET Online. It was directed by Shaun Silva.

== Commercial performance ==
"That's My Kind of Night" debuted at number 21 on the Billboard Country Airplay and number 40 on the Hot Country Songs charts dated of August 17, 2013. It also debuted at number 16 on the Billboard Hot 100 and number 19 on the Canadian Hot 100 charts dated of August 31, 2013.

It reached number one on the Hot Country Songs chart in its third week. The single was certified 7× Platinum by the Recording Industry Association of America (RIAA) on November 22, 2024, and it reached its 2 million sales mark in the United States in June 2014.

Bryan, with the help of "That's My Kind of Night", set a record in late 2013 as the first male country music artist to top Billboard's Hot Country Songs and Top Country Albums charts simultaneously.

== Charts ==
=== Weekly charts ===
Chart (2013–2014)	Peak position
Canada Hot 100 (Billboard)	19
Canada Country (Billboard)	2
US Billboard Hot 100	15
US Hot Country Songs (Billboard)	1
US Country Airplay (Billboard)	2

=== Year-end charts ===
Chart (2013)	Position
US Billboard Hot 100	78
US Country Airplay (Billboard)	25
US Hot Country Songs (Billboard)	11

Chart (2014)	Position
US Hot Country Songs (Billboard)	55

=== Decade-end charts ===
Chart (2010–2019)	Position
US Hot Country Songs (Billboard)	32

== Certifications ==
Region	Certification	Certified units/sales
Canada (Music Canada)	Platinum	80,000^{*}
New Zealand (RMNZ)	Gold	15,000^{‡}
United States (RIAA)	8× Platinum	8,000,000^{‡}
^{*} Sales figures based on certification alone.^{‡} Sales+streaming figures based on certification alone.
