= Drink a Beer =

Single by Luke Bryan

from the album Crash My Party
- Released: November 11, 2013
- Recorded: 2013
- Genre: Country
- Length: 3:23
- Label: Capitol Nashville
- Songwriters: Jim Beavers; Chris Stapleton
- Producer: Jeff Stevens

Luke Bryan singles chronology
"That's My Kind of Night" (2013)	"Drink a Beer" (2013)	"This Is How We Roll" (2014)

"Drink a Beer" is a song written by Jim Beavers and Chris Stapleton and recorded by American country music artist Luke Bryan. It was released in November 2013 as the third single from his fourth studio album, Crash My Party (2013), and became his seventh number one on the Billboard Country Airplay chart in February 2014. Bryan has described "Drink a Beer" as "the coolest sad song ever" and notes he connects with the story after having lost both of his siblings.

== Content ==
The song is a country ballad about the unexpected loss of someone close. It tells the story of a character who honors the recent passing of a loved one by watching the sunset on the edge of a pier and drinking a beer, which they normally would have done together.

"Drink a Beer" takes a relatively unique approach to the theme of loss by addressing the "very raw, real emotion" that immediately follows the loss of a loved one rather than focusing on how a person copes in the long term or plans to move on and rebuild. Like Lee Brice's "I Drive Your Truck," critics and fans have noted that the subject matter of "Drink a Beer" is striking in its contrast to the party connotations of its title.

== Critical reception ==
The song was well received by music critics, who praised the unprecedented vulnerability in Bryan's delivery. Billy Dukes of Taste of Country described the track as "poignant" and demonstrative of Bryan's ability to connect with an audience, while Christina Vinson of Taste of Country deemed "Drink a Beer" musically "fantastic" and lyrically "extremely touching". Roughstock editor Matt Bjorke indicated Bryan's impassioned vocals giving "an air of authenticity to the lyrics" as the reason for the song's effectiveness, and gave the song a four-and-a-half star ranking. Bjorke also compared it favorably to Miranda Lambert's hit "Over You" in suggesting the song has "the kind of powerful impact" to warrant nods for "Single of the Year" or "Song of the Year".

In HitFix′s review of Crash My Party, Melinda Newman labelled "Drink a Beer" the strongest track on the album (grading it an A−) while praising the "spare" production and noting that the song "doesn't try to be a tearjerker" and is more effective as a result.

Billboard and American Songwriter ranked "Drink a Beer" at number one and number six, respectively, on their lists of the 10 greatest Luke Bryan songs. Rolling Stone ranked the song at #169 on its 200 Greatest Country Songs of All Time ranking.

== Commercial performance ==
"Drink a Beer" debuted at number 59 on the Billboard Country Airplay chart dated of November 16, 2013. It debuted at number 20 on the U.S. Billboard Hot Country Songs chart dated of November 23, 2013. It debuted at number 79 on the U.S. Billboard Hot 100 chart dated of November 23, 2013. It debuted at number 97 on the Canadian Hot 100 chart dated of November 23, 2013. The song reached its one million sales mark in the United States in April 2014. As of August 2015, it has sold 1,447,000 copies in the U.S.

== Music video ==
The music video (which is Bryan's performance of the song at the 2013 CMA Awards) was directed by Paul Miller and premiered in December 2013.

== Live performances ==
Bryan performed "Drink a Beer" at the CMA Awards on November 6, 2013. The performance was dedicated to his late siblings Chris and Kelly.

Lady Antebellum performed the song alongside co-writer Chris Stapleton as a tribute at the 2014 CMT Artists of the Year ceremony, after Bryan was forced to cancel his scheduled performance following the passing of his brother-in-law, Lee. The performance was considered one of the best moments of the show.

== Charts ==
=== Weekly charts ===
Chart (2013–2014)	Peak position
Canada Hot 100 (Billboard)	34
Canada Country (Billboard)	1
US Billboard Hot 100	31
US Country Airplay (Billboard)	1
US Hot Country Songs (Billboard)	1

=== Year-end charts ===
Chart (2014)	Position
Canada Canadian Hot 100	98
US Country Airplay (Billboard)	34
US Hot Country Songs (Billboard)	11

== Certifications ==
Region	Certification	Certified units/sales
Canada (Music Canada)	Gold	40,000^{*}
United States (RIAA)	4× Platinum	4,000,000^{‡}
^{*} Sales figures based on certification alone.^{‡} Sales+streaming figures based on certification alone.
