= Play It Again (song) =

Single by Luke Bryan

from the album Crash My Party
- Released: March 24, 2014
- Recorded: 2013
- Genre: Country pop
- Length: 3:47
- Label: Capitol Nashville
- Songwriters: Dallas Davidson; Ashley Gorley
- Producer: Jeff Stevens

Luke Bryan singles chronology
"This Is How We Roll" (2014)	"Play It Again" (2014)	"Roller Coaster" (2014)

"Play It Again" is a song written by Dallas Davidson and Ashley Gorley and recorded by American country music artist Luke Bryan. It was released in March 2014 as the fourth single from Bryan’s 2013 album Crash My Party. On April 17, 2014, the song became Bryan's eighth non-consecutive chart-topper on the Hot Country Songs chart, the most by any act in the time since his first number one "Rain Is a Good Thing" hit the top spot on July 24, 2010.

== Content ==
The protagonist approaches a girl at a tailgate party. Suddenly, the girl's favorite song comes on, causing her to ask the protagonist to dance with her, and they both exclaim "play it again" when the song is finished. He drives her home that night, when the song comes on the radio, triggering a similar reaction. The next week, they go on a date together where the protagonist plays the song on his guitar.

== Critical reception ==
Matt Bjorke of Roughstock gave the song 4 stars out of 5, praising both the lyrics for "[getting] at the emotion that hits young people who are full of life" and Bryan's charming delivery, which "sells the song". Bjorke also commended the label's timing in releasing a feel-good song so close to Summertime. Billy Dukes of Taste of Country also gave the song a positive review, saying that "This superstar is enjoying a time when everything that he sings sounds unique and feels deeply satisfying. He’s found a few familiar themes that don’t grow old quickly, and his performances have gotten better with each release. ‘Play It Again’ is another hit for Bryan. When it finishes its chart run, it will likely be amongst the top 5 of his career." Vickye Fisher of For The Country Record was less favorable, saying that "The choruses, full production guitars/drums and belted vocals, do nothing to make ‘Play It Again’ sound any different from any other songs on the album, or any other songs on the radio, for that matter. It’s not distinctive, it’s just boring."

== Commercial reception ==
"Play It Again" debuted at number 46 on the Country Airplay chart for the week ending of March 15, 2014. Two weeks later, "Play It Again" entered the Billboard Hot 100 chart at number 81 for the week ending of March 29, 2014. "Play It Again" reached number one on the Hot Country Songs chart dated of April 17, 2014. "Play It Again" reached number one on the Country Airplay chart for the week ending of May 31, 2014; the same week, Florida Georgia Line's "This Is How We Roll", on which Bryan is a featured artist, held the number two position on the Country Airplay chart, making Bryan the first artist in the chart's 24-year history to hold the top two positions simultaneously.

"Play It Again" was certified Diamond by the Recording Industry Association of America (RIAA) in 2026. As of April 2017, the song has sold 2,493,000 copies in the United States.

== Music video ==
The music video was directed by Michael Monaco and premiered in April 2014.

== Charts and certifications ==
=== Weekly charts ===
Chart (2014)	Peak position
Canada Hot 100 (Billboard)	20
Canada Country (Billboard)	1
US Billboard Hot 100	14
US Country Airplay (Billboard)	1
US Hot Country Songs (Billboard)	1

=== Year-end charts ===
Chart (2014)	Position
Canada Canadian Hot 100	75
US Billboard Hot 100	64
US Country Airplay (Billboard)	13
US Hot Country Songs (Billboard)	5

=== Decade-end charts ===
Chart (2010–2019)	Position
US Hot Country Songs (Billboard)	33

=== Certifications ===
Region	Certification	Certified units/sales
Canada (Music Canada)	Gold	40,000^{*}
New Zealand (RMNZ)	Platinum	30,000^{‡}
United Kingdom (BPI)	Silver	200,000^{‡}
United States (RIAA)	Diamond	10,000,000^{‡}
^{*} Sales figures based on certification alone.^{‡} Sales+streaming figures based on certification alone.
