= Luke Bryan discography =

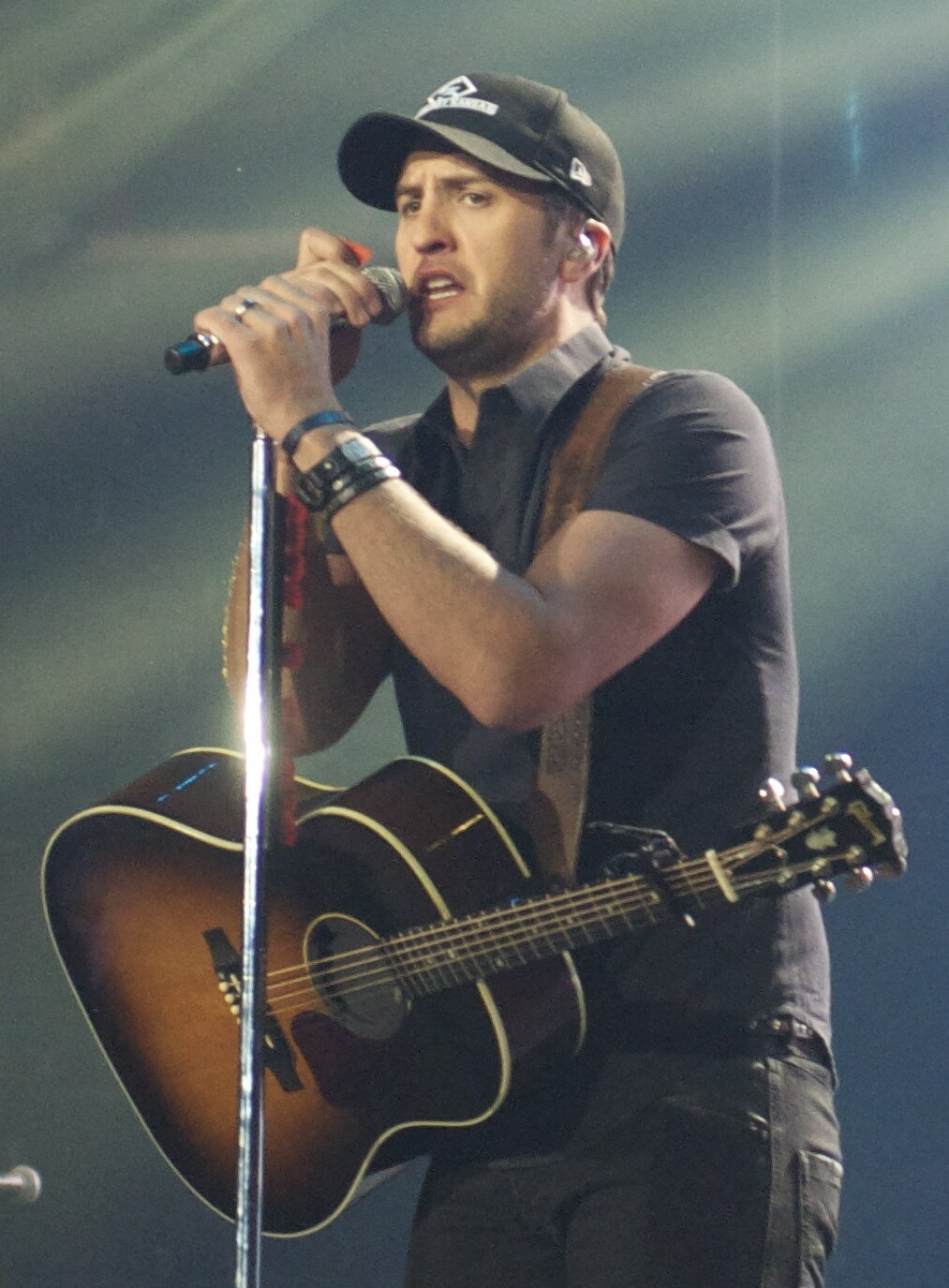
- Bryan in 2014
- Studio albums: 9
- Extended plays: 8
- Compilation albums: 7
- Singles: 39
- Music videos: 45
- Other charted songs: 31
- No. 1 singles (Billboard): 26

American singer Luke Bryan has released nine studio albums, seven compilation albums, eight extended plays, and 39 singles. Bryan began his career with the release of I'll Stay Me in 2007 by Capitol Nashville, with the album spawning two top 10 hits on the Billboard Hot Country Songs chart: his debut single "All My Friends Say" (number five) and "Country Man" (number 10). His second studio album was released in 2009 titled Doin' My Thing, with the lead single "Do I" peaking at number two on Hot Country Songs. This album also produced his first two number-one hits: "Rain Is a Good Thing" in July 2010 and "Someone Else Calling You Baby" in February 2011.

Bryan's next album was Tailgates & Tanlines, released in August 2011; it became his first number one on the Top Country Albums chart and produced four top five hits: "Country Girl (Shake It for Me)" (number four), as well as the number ones "I Don't Want This Night to End", "Drunk on You", and "Kiss Tomorrow Goodbye". His fourth studio album, Crash My Party, was released in August 2013 and became his second number one country album and his first number one on the all-genre Billboard 200. This album produced six additional number one singles in the title track, "That's My Kind of Night", "Drink a Beer", "Play It Again", "Roller Coaster", and "I See You". Kill the Lights was released in August 2015 and became Bryan's third number one country music album and his second number one on the Billboard 200. This album produced six additional number one singles: "Kick the Dust Up", "Strip It Down", "Home Alone Tonight", "Huntin', Fishin' and Lovin' Every Day", "Move", and "Fast".

On December 8, 2017, What Makes You Country was released, spawning three more number one singles: "Light It Up", "Most People Are Good", and "Sunrise, Sunburn, Sunset".

Born Here Live Here Die Here was released on August 7, 2020. Its preceding singles, "Knockin' Boots", "What She Wants Tonight", and "One Margarita" were three additional number ones. "Down to One" was the album's fourth number one followed by "Waves", a single exclusive to the album's deluxe edition, also reaching number one.

Starting in 2009, and continuing until 2015, Bryan released an extended play or album each March to coincide with Spring Break and Farm Tour, starting with Spring Break with All My Friends and ending with Spring Break...Checkin' Out.

== Studio albums ==
Title	Details	Peak chart positions								Sales	Certifications
Title	Details	US	US Country	AUS	AUS Country	CAN	SWI	UK	UK Country	Sales	Certifications
I'll Stay Me	Release date: August 14, 2007; Label: Capitol Nashville; Formats: CD, digital download	24	2	—	—	—	—	—	—	US: 561,000	RIAA: Gold
Doin' My Thing	Release date: October 6, 2009; Label: Capitol Nashville; Formats: CD, digital download	6	2	—	—	—	—	—	—	US: 1,001,000	RIAA: 2× Platinum
Tailgates & Tanlines	Release date: August 9, 2011; Label: Capitol Nashville; Formats: CD, digital download	2	1	64	11	6	—	—	7	US: 2,570,700	RIAA: 5× Platinum; MC: Platinum
Crash My Party	Release date: August 13, 2013; Label: Capitol Nashville; Formats: CD, digital download	1	1	19	4	1	—	—	9	US: 2,653,000	RIAA: 6× Platinum; MC: 2× Platinum; RMNZ: Gold
Kill the Lights	Release date: August 7, 2015; Label: Capitol Nashville; Formats: CD, vinyl, digital download	1	1	4	1	1	100	47	2	US: 1,195,100	RIAA: 3× Platinum; MC: Gold
What Makes You Country	Release date: December 8, 2017; Label: Capitol Nashville; Formats: CD, vinyl, digital download	1	1	6	1	5	68	—	2	US: 363,700	RIAA: Platinum
Born Here Live Here Die Here	Release date: August 7, 2020; Label: Capitol Nashville / Row Crop; Formats: CD, vinyl, digital download, streaming	5	1	2	1	5	14	—	3	US: 200,000	RIAA: Platinum; MC: Platinum
Mind of a Country Boy	Release date: September 27, 2024; Label: Capitol Nashville / Row Crop; Formats: CD, vinyl, digital download, streaming	51	11	—	—	80	—	—	—		
Signs	Release date: September 18, 2026; Label: MCA Nashville / Row Crop; Formats: CD, vinyl, digital download, streaming	41	8	65	10	—	—	—	—		
"—" denotes releases that did not chart

== Compilation albums ==
Title	Details	Peak chart positions			Sales	Certifications
Title	Details	US	US Country	CAN	Sales	Certifications
Spring Break...Here to Party	Release date: March 5, 2013; Label: Capitol Nashville; Formats: CD, digital download	1	1	1	US: 605,000	RIAA: Gold
4 Album Collection	Release date: November 19, 2013; Label: Capitol Nashville; Formats: CD, digital download	—	33	—		
Spring Break...Checkin' Out	Release date: March 10, 2015; Label: Capitol Nashville; Formats: Digital download, CD	3	1	2	US: 245,800; CAN: 9,300	RIAA: Gold
Spring Break...The Set List: The Complete Spring Break Collection ZinePak	Release date: March 10, 2015; Label: Capitol Nashville; Formats: CD, digital download	—	5	—	US: 9,200	
Apple Music Essentials	Release date: June 9, 2019; Label: Capitol Nashville; Formats: Vinyl	—	—	—		
#1’s Volume 1	Release date: November 14, 2020; Label: Capitol Nashville; Formats: Vinyl	—	—	—		
Prayin' in a Deer Stand	Release date: December 2, 2022; Label: Capitol Nashville; Formats: Digital download	—	—	—		
"—" denotes releases that did not chart

== Extended plays ==
Title	Details	Peak chart positions			Sales
Title	Details	US	US Country	CAN	Sales
Spring Break with All My Friends	Release date: March 10, 2009; Label: Capitol Nashville; Formats: Digital download	—	—	—	US: 144,000+
Rhapsody Originals	Release date: 2009; Label: Capitol Nashville; Formats: Digital download	—	—	—	US: 144,000+
Spring Break 2... Hangover Edition	Release date: March 2, 2010; Label: Capitol Nashville; Formats: Digital download	—	—	—	US: 144,000+
Spring Break 3... It's a Shore Thing	Release date: March 1, 2011; Label: Capitol Nashville; Formats: Digital download	23	6	—	US: 144,000+
Spring Break 4... Suntan City	Release date: March 6, 2012; Label: Capitol Nashville; Formats: Digital download	9	2	—	
Spring Break 6... Like We Ain't Ever	Release date: March 11, 2014; Label: Capitol Nashville; Formats: Digital download	2	1	2	US: 134,000
Farm Tour... Here's to the Farmer	Release date: September 23, 2016; Label: Capitol Nashville / Row Crop; Formats: Digital download	4	1	9	US: 32,000
Up Close with Luke Bryan	Release date: 2017; Label: Capitol Nashville; Formats: Digital download	—	—	—	
Mind of a Country Boy	Release date: June 14, 2024; Label: Capitol Nashville; Formats: Digital download, CD	158	31	80	

== Singles ==
=== 2000s and 2010s ===
Year	Title	Peak chart positions						Sales	Certifications	Album
Year	Title	US	US Country Songs	US Country Airplay	AUS	CAN	CAN Country	Sales	Certifications	Album
2007	"All My Friends Say"	59	5		—	—	21		RIAA: 2× Platinum	I'll Stay Me
2007	"We Rode in Trucks"	—	33		—	—	—		RIAA: Gold	I'll Stay Me
2008	"Country Man"	74	10		—	—	28		RIAA: Gold	I'll Stay Me
2009	"Do I"	34	2		—	66	4	US: 1,755,000	RIAA: 4× Platinum	Doin' My Thing
2010	"Rain Is a Good Thing"	37	1		—	57	3		RIAA: 3× Platinum; MC: Gold	Doin' My Thing
2010	"Someone Else Calling You Baby"	56	1		—	84	4		RIAA: Platinum	Doin' My Thing
2011	"Country Girl (Shake It for Me)"	22	4		—	50	10	US: 3,660,000	RIAA: Diamond; BPI: Gold; MC: 2× Platinum; RMNZ: 2× Platinum	Tailgates & Tanlines
2011	"I Don't Want This Night to End"	22	1		—	48	1	US: 2,730,000	RIAA: 7× Platinum; MC: Platinum	Tailgates & Tanlines
2012	"Drunk on You"	16	1		—	28	1	US: 3,040,000	RIAA: 7× Platinum; MC: 2× Platinum	Tailgates & Tanlines
2012	"Kiss Tomorrow Goodbye"	29	3	1	—	46	1		RIAA: 4× Platinum; MC: Gold	Tailgates & Tanlines
2013	"Crash My Party"	18	2	1	—	18	1	US: 1,593,000	RIAA: 5× Platinum; MC: Platinum	Crash My Party
2013	"That's My Kind of Night"	15	1	2	—	19	2	US: 2,492,000	RIAA: 8× Platinum; MC: Platinum; RMNZ: Gold	Crash My Party
2013	"Drink a Beer"	31	1	1	—	34	1	US: 1,447,000	RIAA: 3× Platinum; MC: Gold	Crash My Party
2014	"Play It Again"	14	1	1	—	20	1	US: 2,493,000	RIAA: Diamond; BPI: Silver; MC: Gold; RMNZ: Platinum	Crash My Party
2014	"Roller Coaster"	43	5	1	—	56	1	US: 583,000	RIAA: 2× Platinum	Crash My Party
2014	"I See You"	41	1	1	—	51	1	US: 581,000	RIAA: 2× Platinum	Crash My Party
2015	"Kick the Dust Up"	26	1	1	98	15	1	US: 1,090,000	RIAA: 3× Platinum	Kill the Lights
2015	"Strip It Down"	30	1	1	—	48	1	US: 779,000	RIAA: 4× Platinum; MC: Gold	Kill the Lights
2015	"Home Alone Tonight" (featuring Karen Fairchild)	38	3	1	—	55	1	US: 441,000	RIAA: Platinum; MC: Gold	Kill the Lights
2016	"Huntin', Fishin' and Lovin' Every Day"	37	2	1	—	51	1	US: 504,000	RIAA: 4× Platinum; MC: Platinum; RMNZ: Gold	Kill the Lights
2016	"Move"	50	5	1	—	82	1	US: 254,000	RIAA: Platinum; MC: Gold	Kill the Lights
2016	"Fast"	58	5	1	—	91	1	US: 172,000	RIAA: Platinum	Kill the Lights
2017	"Light It Up"	57	4	1	—	96	3	US: 164,000	RIAA: 2× Platinum; MC: Platinum	What Makes You Country
2018	"Most People Are Good"	43	4	1	—	70	1	US: 309,000	RIAA: 2× Platinum; MC: Platinum	What Makes You Country
2018	"Sunrise, Sunburn, Sunset"	35	4	1	—	52	2	US: 136,000	RIAA: Platinum; MC: Platinum	What Makes You Country
2018	"What Makes You Country"	54	7	2	—	80	1	US: 102,000	RIAA: Platinum	What Makes You Country
2019	"Knockin' Boots"	31	2	1	— (Note: "Knockin' Boots" did not enter the ARIA Singles Chart, but peaked at number 30 on the ARIA Digital Track Chart.)	30	2	US: 243,000	RIAA: 3× Platinum; MC: 4× Platinum; RMNZ: Gold	Born Here Live Here Die Here
2019	"What She Wants Tonight"	46	6	1	— (Note: "What She Wants Tonight" did not enter the ARIA Singles Chart, but peaked at number 30 on the ARIA Digital Track Chart.)	91	2	US: 51,000	RIAA: Platinum; MC: Gold	Born Here Live Here Die Here
"—" denotes releases that did not chart

=== 2020s ===
Year	Title	Peak chart positions					Certifications	Album
Year	Title	US	US Country Songs	US Country Airplay	CAN	CAN Country	Certifications	Album
2020	"One Margarita"	19	2	1	29	1	RIAA: 4× Platinum; MC: Platinum; RMNZ: Gold	Born Here Live Here Die Here
2020	"Down to One"	36	5	1	34	1	RIAA: Platinum; MC: Gold	Born Here Live Here Die Here
2021	"Waves"	24	2	1	56	1	RIAA: Gold	Born Here Live Here Die Here
2021	"Up"	—	33	21	—	23		Born Here Live Here Die Here
2022	"Country On"	72	15	3	80	7	RIAA: Gold	Mind of a Country Boy
2023	"But I Got a Beer in My Hand"	91	19	4	79	2		Mind of a Country Boy
2024	"Love You, Miss You, Mean It"	39	11	2	65	4	RIAA: Gold	Mind of a Country Boy
2024	"Country Song Came On"	93	25	3	—	9		Mind of a Country Boy
2024	"Georgia Ways" (with Quavo and Teddy Swims)	— (Note: "Georgia Ways" did not enter the Billboard Hot 100, but peaked at number 7 on the Bubbling Under Hot 100 chart.)	26	—	—	—		Non-album single
2025	"Winter Wonderland" (with Ella Langley)	—	47	41	—	—		Luke Bryan Christmas
2026	"Country and She Knows It"	51	15	3	—	38		Signs
2026	"Finders Keepers" (with Luke Combs)	83	30	26	—	—		Signs
"—" denotes releases that did not chart

=== As featured artist ===
Year	Title	Peak chart positions								Certifications	Album
Year	Title	US	US Country Songs	US Country Airplay	AUS	CAN	CAN Country	SCO	WW	Certifications	Album
2012	"The Only Way I Know" (Jason Aldean with Luke Bryan and Eric Church)	40	5	1	—	53	2	—	—	RIAA: Platinum; MC: Gold	Night Train
2014	"This Is How We Roll" (Florida Georgia Line featuring Luke Bryan)	16	1	2	—	20	2	—	—	RIAA: 6× Platinum; ARIA: Platinum; RMNZ: Platinum	Here's to the Good Times... This Is How We Roll
2016	"Forever Country" (as part of Artists of Then, Now & Forever)	21	1	32	26	25	39	29	—	RIAA: Gold	Non-album single
2018	"Straight to Hell" (Darius Rucker featuring Jason Aldean, Luke Bryan, and Charles Kelley)	—	—	40	—	—	—	—	—	RIAA: Gold	When Was the Last Time
2021	"Buy Dirt" (Jordan Davis with Luke Bryan)	22	1	1	—	24	1	—	117	RIAA: 5× Platinum; ARIA: 4× Platinum; MC: 8× Platinum; RMNZ: 2× Platinum	Bluebird Days
2023	"Cowboys and Plowboys" (Jon Pardi and Luke Bryan)	—	—	26	—	—	48	—	—		Non-album singles
2026	"Ride, Ride, Ride" (George Birge featuring Luke Bryan)	— (Note: "Ride, Ride, Ride" did not enter the Billboard Hot 100, but peaked at number 15 on the Bubbling Under Hot 100 chart.)	39	12	—	—	10	—	—		Non-album singles
"—" denotes releases that did not chart

== Other charted and certified songs ==
Year	Title	Peak chart positions					Certifications	Album
Year	Title	US	US Country Songs	US Country Airplay	CAN	CAN Country	Certifications	Album
2008	"Run Run Rudolph"	—	42		—	—		Country for Christmas
2009	"Drinkin' Beer & Wasting Bullets"	—	—		—	—	RIAA: Gold	Doin' My Thing
2010	"Wild Weekend"	— (Note: "Wild Weekend" did not enter the Billboard Hot 100, but peaked at number 17 on the Bubbling Under Hot 100 Singles chart.)	—		—	—		Spring Break 2... Hangover Edition
2011	"Muckalee Creek Water"	—	—		—	—	RIAA: Gold	Tailgates & Tanlines
2013	"Buzzkill"	74	20	59	63	—	RIAA: Gold	Spring Break… Here to Party
2013	"Just a Sip"	— (Note: "Just a Sip" did not enter the Billboard Hot 100, but peaked at number 18 on the Bubbling Under Hot 100 Singles chart.)	37	—	—	—		Spring Break… Here to Party
2013	"In Love with the Girl"	—	40	—	—	—		Spring Break… Here to Party
2013	"Suntan City"	—	43	—	—	—		Spring Break… Here to Party
2013	"If You Ain't Here to Party"	—	44	—	—	—		Spring Break… Here to Party
2013	"Take My Drunk Ass Home"	—	49	—	—	—		Spring Break… Here to Party
2013	"Dirt Road Diary"	— (Note: "Dirt Road Diary" did not enter the Billboard Hot 100, but peaked at number 17 on the Bubbling Under Hot 100 Singles chart.)	32	—	—	—		Crash My Party
2013	"Beer in the Headlights"	—	45	—	—	—		Crash My Party
2014	"Hairy Christmas" (with Willie Robertson)	—	49	45	—	—		Duck the Halls: A Robertson Family Christmas
2014	"Good Lookin' Girl"	—	31	—	— (Note: "Good Lookin’ Girl" did not enter the Canadian Hot 100, but peaked at number 71 on the Hot Canadian Digital Song Sales chart.)	—		Spring Break 6… Like We Ain't Ever
2014	"She Get Me High"	—	33	—	—	—		Spring Break 6… Like We Ain't Ever
2014	"Like We Ain't Ever"	—	37	—	52	—		Spring Break 6… Like We Ain't Ever
2015	"Games"	92	21	20	46	32	RIAA: Gold	Spring Break… Checkin' Out
2015	"Spring Breakdown"	— (Note: "Spring Breakdown" did not enter the Billboard Hot 100, but peaked at number 16 on the Bubbling Under Hot 100 Singles chart.)	33	—	— (Note: "Spring Breakdown" did not enter the Canadian Hot 100, but peaked at number 38 on the Hot Canadian Digital Song Sales chart.)	—		Spring Break… Checkin' Out
2015	"You and the Beach"	—	39	—	—	—		Spring Break… Checkin' Out
2015	"My Ol' Bronco"	—	44	—	— (Note: "My Ol' Bronco" did not enter the Canadian Hot 100, but peaked at number 42 on the Hot Canadian Digital Song Sales chart.)	—		Spring Break… Checkin' Out
2015	"Kill the Lights"	—	35	—	—	—		Kill the Lights
2015	"To the Moon and Back"	—	37	—	—	—		Kill the Lights
2015	"Way Way Back"	—	42	—	—	—		Kill the Lights
2015	"Scarecrows"	—	— (Note: "Scarecrow" did not enter the Hot Country Songs chart, but peaked at number 46 on the Country Digital Song Sales chart.)	—	—	—		Kill the Lights
2016	"Here's to the Farmer"	—	33	—	—	—		Farm Tour... Here's to the Farmer
2016	"Love Me in a Field"	—	41	—	— (Note: "Love Me in a Field" did not enter the Canadian Hot 100, but peaked at number 43 on the Hot Canadian Digital Song Sales chart.)	—		Farm Tour... Here's to the Farmer
2016	"Southern Gentleman"	—	— (Note: "Southern Gentleman" did not enter the Hot Country Songs chart, but peaked at number 35 on the Country Digital Song Sales chart.)	—	—	—		Farm Tour... Here's to the Farmer
2017	"Out of Nowhere Girl"	—	— (Note: "Out of Nowhere Girl" did not enter the Hot Country Songs chart, but peaked at number 19 on the Country Digital Song Sales chart.)	—	—	—		What Makes You Country
2018	"O Holy Night"	—	—	58	—	—		Non-album song
2020	"Born Here Live Here Die Here"	—	— (Note: "Born Here Live Here Die Here" did not enter the Hot Country Songs chart, but peaked at number 19 on the Country Digital Song Sales chart.)	—	—	—		Born Here Live Here Die Here
2020	"Build Me a Daddy"	—	35	—	—	— (Note: "Build Me a Daddy" did not enter the Billboard Canadian Hot 100, but peaked at number 32 on the Hot Canadian Digital Song Sales chart.)		Born Here Live Here Die Here
2021	"Songs You Never Heard"	—	— (Note: "Songs You Never Heard" did not enter the Hot Country Songs chart, but peaked at number 8 on the Country Digital Song Sales chart.)	—	—	—		Prayin' in a Deer Stand
"—" denotes releases that did not chart

== Music videos ==
Year	Title	Director
2007	"All My Friends Say"	Shaun Silva
2007	"We Rode in Trucks"	Shaun Silva
2008	"Country Man"	Luke Bryan
2008	"Run Run Rudolph"	Unlisted
2009	"Do I"	Shaun Silva
2010	"Rain Is a Good Thing"	Shaun Silva
2011	"Take My Drunk Ass Home"	Unlisted
2011	"It's a Shore Thing"	Potsy Ponciroli
2011	"Country Girl (Shake It for Me)"	Shaun Silva
2011	"If You Ain't Here to Party"	Michael Monaco
2011	"I Don't Want This Night to End"	Shaun Silva
2012	"Suntan City"	Michael Monaco
2012	"Drunk on You"	Shaun Silva
2012	"Kiss Tomorrow Goodbye"	Shaun Silva
2012	"The Only Way I Know" (live; with Jason Aldean and Eric Church)	Paul Miller
2013	"Buzzkill"	Michael Monaco
2013	"Crash My Party"	Shaun Silva
2013	"That's My Kind of Night" (live)	Michael Monaco
2013	"That's My Kind of Night"	Shaun Silva
2013	"Drink a Beer" (live)	Paul Miller
2014	"This Is How We Roll" (with Florida Georgia Line)	Marc Klasfeld
2014	"She Get Me High"	Michael Monaco
2014	"Play It Again"	Michael Monaco
2014	"Roller Coaster"	Michael Monaco
2015	"Spring Breakdown"	Michael Monaco
2015	"Kick the Dust Up" (live)	Joe DeMaio
2015	"Strip It Down"	Shaun Silva
2016	"Huntin', Fishin' and Lovin' Every Day"	Michael Monaco, Hunter Jobes
2016	"Here's to the Farmer"	Michael Monaco
2016	"Move"	Shane Drake
2016	"Forever Country" (amongst Artists of Then, Now & Forever)	Joseph Kahn
2016	"I Do All My Dreamin' There"	Roger Pistole
2017	"Fast"	Michael Monaco
2017	"Light It Up"	Michael Monaco
2018	"Most People Are Good"	Wes Edwards
2018	"Straight to Hell" (Darius Rucker with Jason Aldean, Luke Bryan, and Charles Kelley)	TK McKamy
2018	"Sunrise, Sunburn, Sunset"	Michael Monaco
2018	"What Makes You Country"	Michael Monaco
2019	"Knockin' Boots"	Isaac Rentz
2019	"What She Wants Tonight"	Michael Monaco
2020	"One Margarita"	Michael Monaco
2020	"Build Me A Daddy"	Unlisted
2020	"Born Here Live Here Die Here"	Unlisted
2021	"Waves"	Unlisted
2021	"Down to One"	Shaun Silva
2021	"Bill Dance"	Unlisted
2022	"Up"	Chris Hicky
2022	"Country On"	Shaun Silva
2023	"But I Got a Beer in My Hand"	Jim Wright
2024	"Love You, Miss You, Mean It"	Dustin Haney
