= Country Man =

Single by Luke Bryan

from the album I'll Stay Me
- Released: March 24, 2008
- Recorded: 2006–2007
- Genre: Country
- Length: 3:10
- Label: Capitol Nashville
- Songwriters: Luke Bryan; Galen Griffin; Patrick Jason Matthews
- Producer: Jeff Stevens

Luke Bryan singles chronology
"We Rode in Trucks" (2007)	"Country Man" (2008)	"Do I" (2009)

"Country Man" is a song co-written and recorded by American country music artist Luke Bryan. It originally appeared on his 2006 self-titled EP, and was released in March 2008 as the third single from his debut album I'll Stay Me. The song, like Bryan's previous two singles ("All My Friends Say" and "We Rode in Trucks"), charted in the top 40 on the Billboard Hot Country Songs chart. His second top 10 single, it was the first in a streak of 29 consecutive top 10 singles for Bryan. This streak ended in 2022, when "Up" peaked at number 21. It was written by Bryan, Patrick Jason Matthews and Galen Griffin.

== Content ==
The song is a moderate up-tempo, accompanied by fiddle and guitar. Its lyrics focus the male narrator, who is describing himself to a female, trying to convince her that she does not need a "city boy", but rather a "country man."

== Critical reception ==
Billboard reviewer Ken Tucker, who gave I'll Stay Me a favorable review for its "unapologetically country" sound, described the song as a "down-home romper". AllMusic critic Thom Jurek referred to it as "line-dance swagger" that was "calculating" but "execute[d] nearly flawlessly".

Brady Vercher of Engine 145, however, gave the song a "thumbs down" review, describing it as "mindlessly list[ing] anything that could be superficially associated with being a country man". He also thought that the song posed a risk of typecasting Bryan as "the corporate manufactured country boy image" by following so closely on his debut single "All My Friends Say". Michael Sudhalter of Country Standard Time also thought unfavorably of the song, describing it as being "chock full of country clichés", although he called it "the only misstep" on the album.

== Chart performance ==
Chart (2008)	Peak position
Canada Country (Billboard)	28
US Billboard Hot 100	74
US Hot Country Songs (Billboard)	10

=== Year-end charts ===
Chart (2008)	Position
US Country Songs (Billboard)	40

== Certifications ==
Region	Certification	Certified units/sales
United States (RIAA)	Gold	500,000^{‡}
^{‡} Sales+streaming figures based on certification alone.
