= Finders Keepers (Luke Bryan and Luke Combs song) =

Single by Luke Bryan and Luke Combs

from the album Signs
- Released: October 26, 2026
- Recorded: 2025–2026
- Genre: Country
- Length: 3:43
- Label: MCA Nashville; Row Crop
- Songwriters: Beau Bailey; Jimi Bell; Sam Ellis
- Producers: Jeff Stevens; Jody Stevens

Luke Bryan singles chronology
| "Country and She Knows It" (2026) | "Finders Keepers" (2026) |

Luke Combs singles chronology
| "Rethink Some Things" (2026) | "Finders Keepers" (2026) |

Music video
- "Finders Keepers" on YouTube

"Finders Keepers" is a song by American country music singers Luke Bryan and Luke Combs. It is set to impact country radio on October 26, 2026, as the second single from Bryan's ninth studio album, Signs. The song was written by Beau Bailey, Jimi Bell, and Sam Ellis and produced by Jeff Stevens and Jody Stevens.

== Background ==
Bryan first heard the song while recording his album Signs in the studio and immediately recorded it himself. After that, he invited Combs to collaborate on the song, having always wanted to work with him.

== Composition ==
In the song, Bryan and Combs give advice to a man dealing with a breakup. They encourage him to drink his troubles away and look on the bright side, reminding him that he is not the only person who has been heartbroken and should learn to accept the situation. The instrumental features guitar picking that gives the song a distinctly honky-tonk feel.

== Charts ==
Chart performance for "Finders Keepers"
| Chart (2026) | Peak position |
|---|---|
| Canada Country (Billboard) | 49 |
| US Billboard Hot 100 | 83 |
| US Country Airplay (Billboard) | 26 |
| US Hot Country Songs (Billboard) | 30 |
