= Cowboys and Plowboys =

Single by Luke Bryan and Jon Pardi
- Released: October 13, 2023
- Genre: Country
- Length: 3:28
- Label: Capitol Nashville
- Songwriters: Rhett Akins; Jacob Rice; Cole Taylor
- Producers: Bart Butler; Ryan Gore; Jon Pardi

Luke Bryan singles chronology
"But I Got a Beer in My Hand" (2023)	"Cowboys and Plowboys" (2023)	"Love You, Miss You, Mean It" (2024)

Jon Pardi singles chronology
"Your Heart or Mine" (2022)	"Cowboys and Plowboys" (2023)	"Friday Night Heartbreaker" (2024)

Music video
- "Cowboys and Plowboys" on YouTube

"Cowboys and Plowboys" is a song by American country music singers Luke Bryan and Jon Pardi. It was released on October 13, 2023, as a non-album single. The song was co-written by Rhett Akins, Jacob Rice, and Cole Taylor and co-produced by Bart Butler, Ryan Gore, and Pardi.

== Background and release ==
Pardi first revealed plans for a duet with Bryan in 2022 while promoting his album Mr. Saturday Night, describing the track as an anthem for "farmers and cowboys, the backbone of this country." Co-written by Rhett Akins, Jacob Rice, and Cole Taylor, the collaboration was teased by both artists on social media before its official release.

The single was released on October 13, 2023, and officially impacted country radio on October 16.

== Critical reception ==
The track was noted by media outlets as Pardi's first new music since Mr. Saturday Night, excluding his 2022 Christmas release, and Bryan's follow-up to his 2020 album Born Here Live Here Die Here. Taste of Country described the song as a "jubilant, twangy ode" to rural life, while American Songwriter highlighted its message of unity between farmers and cowboys.

== Music video ==
The official music video for "Cowboys and Plowboys", directed by Shaun Silva, was filmed in Tennessee and Pardi's home state of California. It features rodeo champions such as Kyle Lockett, Dallas Owen, and Jordan Ketscher, alongside family appearances of Bryan's wife Caroline Boyer, their dog Choc, Pardi's wife Summer, and their daughter Presley.

== Credits and personnel ==
Credits adapted from Tidal.

- Luke Bryan – producer, vocals
- Jon Pardi – vocals
- Danny Rader – acoustic guitar
- Trey Keller – background vocals
- Lee Francis – bass
- Miles McPherson – drums, percussion
- Brent Mason – electric guitar
- Rob McNelley – electric guitar
- Jenee Fleenor – fiddle
- Dave Cohen – Hammond B3 organ
- Mike Johnson – pedal steel guitar
- Bart Butler – producer
- Ryan Gore – producer, engineer, mixing
- Chris Small – editing
- Ted Jensen – mastering

== Charts ==
Chart performance for "Cowboys and Plowboys"
Chart (2023–2024)	Peak position
Canada Country (Billboard)	48
US Country Airplay (Billboard)	26
