= But I Got a Beer in My Hand =

Single by Luke Bryan

from the album Mind of a Country Boy
- Released: May 15, 2023
- Genre: Country
- Length: 2:56
- Label: Capitol Nashville
- Songwriters: Chase McGill; Matt Dragstrem; Geoff Warburton
- Producers: Jeff Stevens; Jody Stevens

Luke Bryan singles chronology
"Country On" (2022)	"But I Got a Beer in My Hand" (2023)	"Cowboys and Plowboys" (2023)

"But I Got a Beer in My Hand" is a song by American country music singer Luke Bryan. It was released on May 15, 2023, as the second single from Bryan's eighth studio album, Mind of a Country Boy.

== History ==
Cillea Houghton of American Songwriter wrote that the song is an "upbeat song that is quintessentially Bryan with nods to a deer stand, Lucchese cowboy boots, and, of course, beer. The lyrics find the singer as a man who was just broken up with. But rather than being sad, Bryan has the comfort of a cold one to keep him company." The song was written by Chase McGill, Matt Dragstrem, and Geoff Warburton. In mid-2023, Bryan released a music video directed by Jim Wright and filmed in Springfield, Tennessee.

== Chart performance ==
=== Weekly charts ===
Weekly chart performance for "But I Got a Beer in My Hand"
Chart (2023)	Peak position
Canada Hot 100 (Billboard)	79
Canada Country (Billboard)	2
US Billboard Hot 100	91
US Country Airplay (Billboard)	4
US Hot Country Songs (Billboard)	19

=== Year-end charts ===
2023 year-end chart performance for "But I Got a Beer in My Hand"
Chart (2023)	Position
US Country Airplay (Billboard)	42
US Hot Country Songs (Billboard)	58

2024 year-end chart performance for "But I Got a Beer in My Hand"
Chart (2024)	Position
US Country Airplay (Billboard)	58
