= One Margarita =

Single by Luke Bryan

from the album Born Here Live Here Die Here
- Released: April 13, 2020
- Genre: Country
- Length: 3:13
- Label: Capitol Nashville; Row Crop
- Songwriters: Michael Carter; Matt Dragstrem; Josh Thompson
- Producers: Jeff Stevens; Jody Stevens

Luke Bryan singles chronology
"What She Wants Tonight" (2020)	"One Margarita" (2020)	"Down to One" (2020)

"One Margarita" is a song recorded by American country music singer Luke Bryan. It is the third single from his seventh studio album Born Here Live Here Die Here. Bryan's bandleader Michael Carter wrote the song with Josh Thompson and Matt Dragstrem.

The song peaked at number 19 on the US Billboard Hot 100, making it Bryan's first Top 20 in the United States since his 2014 hit "Play It Again", which peaked at number 14. The song also peaked at number one on the U.S. Billboard Country Airplay chart and at number 2 on the Hot Country Songs chart. "One Margarita" was certified 4× Platinum by the RIAA in 2026.

== Content and history ==
Wendy Hermanson of the blog Taste of Country wrote of the song that it is a "light, sparkling, feel-good number dedicated to a bit of old-fashioned hedonism that has Bryan counting 'One margarita, two margarita, three margarita, we'll be gone,' and name-dropping Bob Marley, Jimmy Buffett, and Kenny Chesney. A mariachi band helps the vibe along, and everyone has plenty of smiles to spare. Jon Freeman of Rolling Stone Country wrote that the song has an "equally buoyant melody and groove that’s punctuated by mandolin and peals of Hammond organ. Bryan, who’s no stranger to a party song, looks at the bigger picture of vacation as escape from the stress and anxiety of everyday existence." Bryan's bandleader, Michael Carter, wrote the song with Josh Thompson and Matt Dragstrem. The song was officially released to radio on April 13, 2020. It is the album's third single, following "Knockin' Boots" and "What She Wants Tonight".

== Critical reception ==
"One Margarita" was included on a list of the worst songs of 2020 published by Variety; the song was described as an "[ode] to alcohol abuse" and the "wrong song at the wrong time" in light of the ongoing COVID-19 pandemic.

== Music video ==
The song's music video was directed by Michael Monaco. It features Bryan "cavorting on the beach". Bryan's wife, Caroline, and mother, LeClaire, make guest appearances, as do Caylee Hammack and members of Old Dominion. Bryan filmed the video during Crash My Playa, an annual beach party he holds in Mexico, in January 2020 prior to the song's release.

== Chart performance ==
=== Weekly charts ===
Chart (2020)	Peak position
Canada Hot 100 (Billboard)	29
Canada Country (Billboard)	1
US Billboard Hot 100	19
US Country Airplay (Billboard)	1
US Hot Country Songs (Billboard)	2
US Rolling Stone Top 100	14

=== Year-end charts ===
Chart (2020)	Position
Canada (Canadian Hot 100)	93
US Billboard Hot 100	70
US Country Airplay (Billboard)	11
US Hot Country Songs (Billboard)	11

== Certifications ==
Region	Certification	Certified units/sales
Canada (Music Canada)	Platinum	80,000^{‡}
New Zealand (RMNZ)	Gold	15,000^{‡}
United States (RIAA)	4× Platinum	4,000,000^{‡}
^{‡} Sales+streaming figures based on certification alone.
