= Someone Else Calling You Baby =

Single by Luke Bryan

from the album Doin' My Thing
- Released: August 2, 2010
- Recorded: 2009
- Genre: Country
- Length: 3:49
- Label: Capitol Nashville
- Songwriters: Luke Bryan; Jeff Stevens
- Producer: Jeff Stevens

Luke Bryan singles chronology
"Rain Is a Good Thing" (2010)	"Someone Else Calling You Baby" (2010)	"Country Girl (Shake It for Me)" (2011)

"Someone Else Calling You Baby" is a song co-written and recorded by American country music artist Luke Bryan. It was released in August 2010 as the third and final single from his 2009 album Doin' My Thing. The song became Bryan's second number one hit on the US Billboard Hot Country Songs chart in February 2011. Bryan wrote this song with Jeff Stevens.

== Content ==
"Someone Else Calling You Baby" is a moderate uptempo tune mainly accompanied by electric guitar. In it, the male narrator sees his lover in someone else's truck and wonders if she has left him for someone else.

This song is set in the key of A♭ major, with a tempo of approximately 115 beats per minute. Bryan's vocals range from C_{3} to F_{4}.

== Critical reception ==
In his review of the album, Michael Sudhalter of Country Standard Time viewed the song positively, saying that it could be a sequel to the relationship described in the album's first single, "Do I." Giving it four stars out of five, Bobby Peacock of Roughstock compared its theme to Rhett Akins' "That Ain't My Truck," and compared Bryan's vocals to those of John Anderson. The song received a "thumbs down" from Janet Goodman of Engine 145, also praising Bryan's vocals and the production but saying that the song's lyrics were in a "straightforward style with no twists."

Billboard and American Songwriter ranked "Someone Else Calling You Baby" at number two and number four, respectively, on their lists of the 10 greatest Luke Bryan songs.

== Chart performance ==
"Someone Else Calling You Baby" debuted at number 52 on the Hot Country Songs chart dated for the week ending of August 14, 2010 and became Bryan's second number one hit on that chart after "Rain Is a Good Thing". It also debuted at number 100 on the Billboard Hot 100 chart for the week of November 13, 2010.

Chart (2010–2011)	Peak position
US Hot Country Songs (Billboard)	1
US Billboard Hot 100	56
Canada Hot 100 (Billboard)	84
Canada Country (Billboard)	4

=== Year-end charts ===
Chart (2011)	Position
US Country Songs (Billboard)	33

== Certifications ==
Region	Certification	Certified units/sales
United States (RIAA)	Platinum	1,000,000^{‡}
^{‡} Sales+streaming figures based on certification alone.
