= Love You, Miss You, Mean It =

Single by Luke Bryan

from the album Mind of a Country Boy
- Released: April 8, 2024
- Genre: Country
- Length: 3:21
- Label: Capitol Nashville
- Songwriters: Rhett Akins; Ben Hayslip; Jordan Minton; Jacob Rice
- Producers: Jeff Stevens; Jody Stevens

Luke Bryan singles chronology
"Cowboys and Plowboys" (2023)	"Love You, Miss You, Mean It" (2024)	"Country Song Came On" (2024)

Music video
- "Love You, Miss You, Mean It" on YouTube

"Love You, Miss You, Mean It" is a song by American country music singer Luke Bryan. It was released on April 8, 2024, as the third single from his eighth studio album, Mind of a Country Boy. The song was written by Rhett Akins, Ben Hayslip, Jordan Minton and Jacob Rice, and produced by Jeff Stevens and Jody Stevens. The song reached #2 on the Country Airplay chart on the week ending October 12, 2024, behind "Pour Me A Drink" by Post Malone and Blake Shelton.

== Content ==
The song is about a couple who meets during their high school years, then separates when the woman in the relationship goes off to college. In the final verse, the woman sends the narrator a text message with the title phrase. Bryan said he chose to record the song because it reminded him of his relationship with his own wife, Caroline.

== Music video ==
The music video was directed by Dustin Haney and released on June 27, 2024.

== Personnel ==
Musicians

- Luke Bryan – lead vocals
- Trey Keller – background vocals
- Sol Philcox-Littlefield – electric guitar
- Eddy Dunlap – pedal steel
- Evan Hutchings – drums
- David Dorn – keyboards
- Tim Galloway – acoustic guitar
- Jimmie Lee Sloas – bass guitar
- Jody Stevens – programming

Technical

- Jeff Stevens – production
- Jody Stevens – production
- Nathan Dantzler – mastering
- Jeff Juliano – mixing, engineering
- Drew Bollman – engineering, editing
- Jim Cooley – engineering
- Justin "Corky" Cortelyou – engineering
- Brandon Hood – editing
- Dave Cook – engineering assistance
- Nate Juliano – engineering assistance
- Kyle Blunt – engineering assistance
- Zach Kuhlman – engineering assistance
- Scott Johnson – production coordination

== Charts ==
=== Weekly charts ===
Weekly chart performance for "Love You, Miss You, Mean It"
Chart (2024)	Peak position
Canada Hot 100 (Billboard)	65
Canada Country (Billboard)	4
US Billboard Hot 100	39
US Country Airplay (Billboard)	2
US Hot Country Songs (Billboard)	11

=== Year-end charts ===
2024 year-end chart performance for "Love You, Miss You, Mean It"
Chart (2024)	Position
US Country Airplay (Billboard)	34
US Hot Country Songs (Billboard)	56
