= Country Song Came On =

Single by Luke Bryan

from the album Mind of a Country Boy
- Released: November 11, 2024
- Genre: Country
- Length: 3:54
- Label: Capitol Nashville
- Songwriters: Dan Alley; Ryan Beaver; Neil Medley
- Producers: Jeff Stevens; Jody Stevens

Luke Bryan singles chronology
"Love You, Miss You, Mean It" (2024)	"Country Song Came On" (2024)	"Georgia Ways" (2024)

Music video
- "Country Song Came On" on YouTube

"Country Song Came On" is a song by American country music singer Luke Bryan. It was released on November 11, 2024, as the fourth single from his eighth studio album, Mind of a Country Boy. The song was written by Dan Alley, Ryan Beaver and Neil Medley, and produced by Jeff Stevens and Jody Stevens.

== Content ==
Bryan said the song is "like a honky tonk gem", the song finds Luke recounting a string of events that unfold as he takes a surprising route through town in his truck.

== Charts ==
=== Weekly charts ===
Weekly chart performance for "Country Song Came On"
Chart (2024–2025)	Peak position
Canada Country (Billboard)	9
US Billboard Hot 100	93
US Country Airplay (Billboard)	3
US Hot Country Songs (Billboard)	25

=== Year-end charts ===
Year-end chart performance for "Country Song Came On"
Chart (2025)	Position
US Country Airplay (Billboard)	31
