= Spring Break 3...It's a Shore Thing =

Spring Break 3…It's a Shore Thing

EP by Luke Bryan
- Released: March 1, 2011
- Genre: Country
- Length: 14:40
- Label: Capitol Nashville
- Producer: Jeff Stevens

Luke Bryan chronology
Spring Break 2...Hangover Edition (2009)	Spring Break 3…It's a Shore Thing (2011)	Tailgates & Tanlines (2011)

Spring Break 3…It's a Shore Thing is the fourth extended play (EP) by American country music artist Luke Bryan. It was released on March 1, 2011 by Capitol Nashville.

== Track listing ==
Sources: AllMusic

No.	Title	Length
1.	"In Love with the Girl"	3:29
2.	"If You Ain't Here to Party"	3:54
3.	"Shore Thing"	3:54
4.	"Love in a College Town"	3:23
Total length:		14:40

== Chart performance ==
=== Weekly charts ===
Chart (2011)	Peak position
US Billboard 200	23
US Top Country Albums (Billboard)	6
