= Country and She Knows It =

2026 song by Luke Bryan

Single by Luke Bryan

from the album Signs
- Released: March 30, 2026
- Genre: Country
- Length: 2:54
- Label: MCA Nashville; Row Crop
- Songwriters: Matt Dragstrem; Josh Miller; Parker Welling
- Producers: Matt Dragstrem; Jeff Stevens; Jody Stevens

Luke Bryan singles chronology
"Ride, Ride, Ride" (2026)	"Country and She Knows It" (2026)	"Finders Keepers" (2026)

Visualizer video
- "Country and She Knows It" on YouTube

"Country and She Knows It" is a song by American country music singer Luke Bryan. It was released on March 30, 2026 as the lead single from his ninth studio album, Signs, via MCA Nashville and Row Crop Records. The song was co-written by Matt Dragstrem, Josh Miller, and Parker Welling, and co-produced by Dragstrem, Jeff Stevens, and Jody Stevens.

== Background ==
"Country and She Knows It" was written in late 2025 after songwriter Josh Dragstrem hosted a writing session with Josh Miller and Parker Welling. The song was envisioned for Russell Dickerson or Tyler Hubbard, but was ultimately pitched to Bryan, who opted to cut the song.

The song was released digitally on March 27, 2026, and sent to country radio on March 30, right before Bryan began his Word on the Street Tour.

== Commercial performance and critical reception ==
The song has been described as a "perfect, high-energy addition to both [Bryan's] live shows and country radio".

"Country and She Knows It" debuted with 105 first-week Mediabase reporters and was the most-added country of the week, while also being the third song to pick up 100+ station adds in its debut week, following Jason Aldean's "Don't Tell on Me" and Kane Brown's "Woman".

== Personnel ==
Credits adapted from Tidal.

=== Musicians ===
- Luke Bryan – lead vocals
- Jerry Roe – drums
- Jenee Fleenor – fiddle
- Sol Philcox-Littlefield – electric guitar, acoustic guitar, banjo, double bass
- Dave Cohen – keyboards
- Ilya Toshinskiy – acoustic guitar, banjo, mandolin, dobro
- Trey Keller – background vocals
- Matt Dragstrem – programming

=== Technical ===
- Jeff Stevens – production
- Jody Stevens – production
- Matt Dragstrem – production, recording
- Nathan Dantzler – mastering
- Jeff Juliano – mixing, immersive mixing
- Harrison Tate – assistant mastering
- Nate Juliano – assistant mixing
- Julian King – additional engineer

== Charts ==
Weekly chart performance for "Country and She Knows It"
Chart (2026)	Peak position
Canada Country (Billboard)	38
US Billboard Hot 100	51
US Country Airplay (Billboard)	3
US Hot Country Songs (Billboard)	15
