= Down to One =

2020 song by Luke Bryan

Single by Luke Bryan

from the album Born Here Live Here Die Here
- Released: October 19, 2020
- Genre: Country
- Length: 3:41
- Label: Capitol Nashville; Row Crop
- Songwriters: Dallas Davidson; Justin Ebach; Kyle Fishman
- Producers: Jeff Stevens; Jody Stevens

Luke Bryan singles chronology
"One Margarita" (2020)	"Down to One" (2020)	"Waves" (2021)

Music video
- "Down to One" on YouTube

"Down to One" is a song recorded by American country music artist Luke Bryan. The song was co-written by Dallas Davidson with Justin Ebach and Kyle Fishman. It was the fourth single from Bryan's seventh studio album Born Here Live Here Die Here.

== Background ==
"Down to One" was co-written by Dallas Davidson, a frequent collaborator and friend of Bryan. Upon hearing it for the first time, Bryan remarked "it just sounded like a big ol' hit", and that it was his wife Caroline's favorite song from the album.

== Critical reception ==
Billy Dukes of Taste of Country called the track an "easy radio hit". Lauren Jo Black of Country Now referred to it as a "sweet love song" and said it would "without a doubt, be a massive hit at country radio". Hannah Barnes of Popculture remarked that the track is reminiscent of Bryan's early hits with its "breezy, country-tinged production and romantic, summer-inflected lyrics".

== Charts ==
=== Weekly charts ===
Chart (2020–2021)	Peak position
Australia Country Hot 50 (TMN)	26
Canada Hot 100 (Billboard)	34
Canada Country (Billboard)	1
US Billboard Hot 100	36
US Country Airplay (Billboard)	1
US Hot Country Songs (Billboard)	5

=== Year-end charts ===
Chart (2021)	Position
US Country Airplay (Billboard)	21
US Hot Country Songs (Billboard)	35

== Certifications ==
Region	Certification	Certified units/sales
Canada (Music Canada)	Gold	40,000^{‡}
United States (RIAA)	Platinum	1,000,000^{‡}
^{‡} Sales+streaming figures based on certification alone.
