= What She Wants Tonight =

Single by Luke Bryan

from the album Born Here Live Here Die Here
- Released: October 24, 2019
- Genre: Country
- Length: 3:06
- Label: Capitol Nashville; Row Crop
- Songwriters: Luke Bryan; Hillary Lindsey; Ross Copperman; Jon Nite
- Producers: Jeff Stevens; Jody Stevens

Luke Bryan singles chronology
"Knockin' Boots" (2019)	"What She Wants Tonight" (2019)	"One Margarita" (2020)

"What She Wants Tonight" is a song by American country music singer Luke Bryan. Co-written by him along with Hillary Lindsey, Ross Copperman, and Jon Nite, it is the second single from his seventh studio album, Born Here Live Here Die Here, released on August 7, 2020.

== Content and history ==
Bryan released the single on October 24, 2019. It was included on his seventh studio album, Born Here, Live Here, Die Here. The song's producers are Jeff Stevens and his son, Jody Stevens. Bryan wrote the song along with Ross Copperman, Jon Nite, and Hillary Lindsey, three writers with whom Bryan had expressed interest in working. Bryan felt that the song would appeal to female listeners because the girl in the song controls the dynamic of the situation", and that "I've been wanting to get a big, rocking tempo out for some time and this is certainly it." Lyrically, the song is about a sexual encounter with a woman; Taste of Country said of its content that "Passing references of trucks and Kentucky keep the song country, but otherwise, 'What She Wants Tonight' is a fantasy that finds Bryan subject to a wild woman's charms and urgent sexual desires.

The song's release was accompanied by a music video directed by Michael Monaco.

== Commercial performance ==
"What She Wants Tonight" has sold 51,000 copies in the United States as of March 2020.

== Charts ==
=== Weekly charts ===
Chart (2019–2020)	Peak position
Canada Hot 100 (Billboard)	91
Canada Country (Billboard)	2
US Billboard Hot 100	46
US Country Airplay (Billboard)	1
US Hot Country Songs (Billboard)	6

=== Year-end charts ===
Chart (2020)	Position
US Country Airplay (Billboard)	22
US Hot Country Songs (Billboard)	27

== Certifications ==
Region	Certification	Certified units/sales
Canada (Music Canada)	Gold	40,000^{‡}
United States (RIAA)	Platinum	1,000,000^{‡}
^{‡} Sales+streaming figures based on certification alone.
