= Mind of a Country Boy =

Studio album by Luke Bryan
- Released: September 27, 2024
- Genre: Country
- Length: 46:28
- Label: Capitol Nashville
- Producer: Jeff Stevens; Jody Stevens

Luke Bryan chronology
Born Here Live Here Die Here (2020)	Mind of a Country Boy (2024)	Signs (2026)

Singles from Mind of a Country Boy
- 1. "Country On" Released: July 5, 2022; 2. "But I Got a Beer in My Hand" Released: May 15, 2023; 3. "Love You, Miss You, Mean It" Released: April 8, 2024; 4. "Country Song Came On" Released: November 11, 2024

Mind of a Country Boy is the eighth studio album by American country music artist Luke Bryan. It was released on September 27, 2024, through Capitol Records Nashville. The album includes the singles "Country On", "But I Got a Beer in My Hand", "Love You, Miss You, Mean It", and "Country Song Came On".

== Content ==
Bryan co-wrote two of the album's 14 tracks, including its title track, and the team of Jeff Stevens and Jody Stevens handled the album's production. The album's release was preceded by the release of three radio singles, as well as an EP, also titled Mind of a Country Boy, on June 14, 2024. "Closing Time in California" was issued as a promotional single in conjunction with the album announcement on August 8, 2024. It marks Bryan's first new album in four years, with the singer remarking: "I've been able to take my time and really compile songs for this album. If it's a song that I cut two or three years ago, and I still love it, and it still sounds fresh, then I feel like it'll stand the test of time".

== Track listing ==
Mind of a Country Boy track listing
No.	Title	Writer(s)	Length
1.	"Mind of a Country Boy"	Luke Bryan; Rhett Akins; Dallas Davidson; Ben Hayslip	3:16
2.	"Love You, Miss You, Mean It"	Akins; Hayslip; Jordan Minton; Jacob Rice	3:21
3.	"Country Song Came On"	Dan Alley; Ryan Beaver; Neil Medley	3:54
4.	"Pair of Boots"	Tofer Brown; Jaxon Free; Taylor Phillips; Bobby Pinson	3:23
5.	"But I Got a Beer in My Hand"	Matt Dragstrem; Chase McGill; Geoff Warburton	2:56
6.	"Kansas"	Dragstrem; Hillary Lindsey; McGill	3:08
7.	"Country On"	David Frasier; Styles Haury; Mark Nesler; Mitch Oglesby	3:56
8.	"Fish on the Wall"	Davidson; Ben Johnson; Chris Tompkins	3:18
9.	"She's Still Got It"	Will Bundy; Rodney Clawson; Jim McCormick; Heather Morgan	3:24
10.	"Closing Time in California"	John Byron; Mark Holman; Lindsey; McGill	3:29
11.	"For the Kids"	Bryan; Justin Ebach; Brad Tursi	2:59
12.	"Southern and Slow"	Dragstrem; McGill; Josh Thompson	3:07
13.	"I'm on a Tractor"	Lee Thomas Miller; Neil Thrasher	3:11
14.	"Jesus 'Bout My Kids"	Tucker Beathard; Jeff Hyde; Brad Rempel; Ben Stennis	3:06
Total length:			46:28

== Personnel ==
Musicians

- Luke Bryan – lead vocals
- Trey Keller – background vocals (tracks 1–5, 8, 12, 14)
- Sol Philcox-Littlefield – electric guitar (tracks 1–5, 8, 10, 12)
- Eddy Dunlap – pedal steel (tracks 1–4, 8, 10, 12, 14), slide guitar (5), Dobro (8)
- Evan Hutchings – drums (tracks 1, 2, 4, 6–9, 11, 13), percussion (1, 8, 11), tambourine (7)
- David Dorn – keyboards (tracks 1, 2, 4, 8), Hammond B3 (3, 5), Wurlitzer electric piano (3), synthesizer (5, 10, 12), piano (10)
- Tim Galloway – acoustic guitar (tracks 1, 2, 4, 8)
- Jimmie Lee Sloas – bass guitar (tracks 1, 2, 4, 8)
- Jody Stevens – programming (tracks 2, 5–7, 9, 11, 12), synthesizer (7); acoustic guitar, electric guitar, mandolin (12); keyboards (14)
- Ilya Toshinskiy – acoustic guitar (tracks 3, 5–7, 9–14)
- Tony Lucido – bass guitar (tracks 3, 5, 10, 12, 14)
- Jerry Roe – drums, percussion (tracks 3, 5, 10, 12)
- Mark Hill – bass guitar (tracks 6, 7, 9, 11, 13)
- Justin Ostrander – electric guitar (tracks 6, 9, 11, 13)
- Kenny Greenberg – electric guitar (tracks 6, 9, 11, 13)
- Perry Coleman – background vocals (tracks 6, 9)
- Charlie Judge – piano, synthesizer (track 6); Hammond B3 (7), keyboards (9, 11, 13)
- Sarah Buxton – background vocals (track 7)
- Jenee Fleenor – fiddle (track 7)
- Brandon Hood – bouzouki, mandolin (track 8)
- Hillary Lindsey – background vocals (track 10)

Technical

- Jeff Stevens – production
- Jody Stevens – production (all tracks), engineering (track 7)
- Nathan Dantzler – mastering (tracks 1–6, 8–11, 13, 14)
- Adam Ayan – mastering (track 7)
- Andrew Mendelson – mastering (track 12)
- Jeff Juliano – mixing, engineering (tracks 1–6, 8–14)
- Derek Bason – mixing (track 7), engineering (6, 7, 9, 11, 13)
- Drew Bollman – engineering (tracks 1, 3, 8–14), editing (1, 2)
- Jim Cooley – engineering (tracks 1, 2, 4, 8)
- Justin "Corky" Cortelyou – engineering (tracks 2, 7)
- Trey Keller – engineering (track 5), editing (5, 10, 12, 14)
- Brandon Hood – editing (tracks 1–5, 8, 10, 12, 14)
- Chris Small – editing, engineering assistance (tracks 6, 7, 9, 11, 13)
- Dave Cook – engineering assistance (tracks 1–6, 8, 10–14)
- Nate Juliano – engineering assistance (tracks 1–6, 8, 10–14)
- Kyle Blunt – engineering assistance (tracks 1–4, 6–8, 11, 13)
- Zach Kuhlman – engineering assistance (tracks 1–4, 6, 8)
- Joel McKenney – engineering assistance (tracks 5, 10, 12, 14)
- Scott Johnson – production coordination
- Rose Hutcheson – production coordination (tracks 3, 4, 6, 8–11, 13, 14)

== Charts ==
=== Weekly charts ===
Weekly chart performance for Mind of a Country Boy
Chart (2024)	Peak position
Australian Country Albums (ARIA)	14
Canadian Albums (Billboard)	80
US Billboard 200	51
US Top Country Albums (Billboard)	11

=== Year-end charts ===
Year-end chart performance for Mind of a Country Boy
Chart (2024)	Position
Australian Country Albums (ARIA)	51
US Top Country Albums (Billboard)	67
