= Signs (Luke Bryan album) =

Studio album by Luke Bryan
- Released: September 18, 2026
- Recorded: 2025–2026
- Genre: Country
- Length: 37:23
- Labels: MCA Nashville; Row Crop
- Producers: Matt Dragstrem; Jeff Stevens; Jody Stevens

Luke Bryan chronology
| Mind of a Country Boy (2024) | Signs (2026) |

Singles from Signs
- 1. "Country and She Knows It" Released: March 30, 2026; 2. "Finders Keepers" Released: September 18, 2026

Signs is the ninth studio album by the American country music artist Luke Bryan. It was released on September 18, 2026, via MCA Nashville and Row Crop Records. The album was mostly co-produced by brothers Jeff Stevens and Jody Stevens, with additional production from Matt Dragstrem.

== Background ==
Signs was officially announced on May 12, 2026, after teasing it the previous night while serving as a judge on American Idol.

Two promotional singles, "Word on the Street", which is the namesake for his 2026 tour, and "Fish Hunt Golf Drink", were released before the album, while the album's lead single, "Country and She Knows It", was released to country radio on March 30, 2026.

On the album's tone, Bryan said:

"It is always a great day when I get the chance to release new music. I've been working on this album for the past year, and I just love how it turned out. I was able to co-write a few, then turn to the writers in Nashville to round them out. I feel like my fans have always let me record songs that make you feel good, so I went into this album wanting everyone to just have fun."

== Track listing ==
Signs track listing
| No. | Title | Writer(s) | Length |
|---|---|---|---|
| 1. | "Finders Keepers" (featuring Luke Combs) | Beau Bailey; Jimi Bell; Sam Ellis | 3:43 |
| 2. | "Country and She Knows It" | Matt Dragstrem; Josh Miller; Parker Welling | 2:54 |
| 3. | "Word on the Street" | Justin Ebach; Payton Smith; Josh Thompson | 2:56 |
| 4. | "Signs" | Tommy Cecil; Jason Duke; Jon Mills; Patrick Murphy; Jody Stevens | 2:34 |
| 5. | "Fish Hunt Golf Drink" | Luke Bryan; Dragstrem; Chase McGill | 2:34 |
| 6. | "Made It a Memory" | Matt Alderman; Jamie Paulin; Shane Profitt | 3:45 |
| 7. | "Woods" | Dragstrem; Taylor Phillips; Jameson Rodgers; Thompson | 3:07 |
| 8. | "Down Goes the Whiskey" | Whitney Duncan; Jeb Gipson; Jonathan Singleton | 3:15 |
| 9. | "Crooked Rows of Corn" | Bryan; Dragstrem; McGill; Thompson | 3:19 |
| 10. | "I Liked Loving You" | Bell; Jimmy Robbins; Kyle Sturrock | 3:09 |
| 11. | "Killer" | Mark Addison Chandler; Davis Corley; Nate Kenyon | 2:53 |
| 12. | "Praying by the Rules" | Blake Bollinger; Preston Brust; Chris Lucas; Kenyon | 3:14 |
| Total length: | | | 37:23 |

== Personnel ==
Credits are adapted from Tidal.

=== Musicians ===
- Luke Bryan – vocals
- Trey Keller – background vocals (1–3, 5–12)
- Ilya Toshinskiy – acoustic guitar (1, 2, 6, 9, 10, 12); banjo, Dobro guitar, mandolin (2)
- Sol Philcox-Littlefield – electric guitar (1, 9, 10); acoustic guitar, banjo, bass guitar (2)
- Eddy Dunlap – pedal steel guitar (1, 3–12)
- Jody Stevens – programming (1, 4, 7, 9, 10), electric guitar (4, 5), acoustic guitar (4)
- Joe Spivey – fiddle (1, 5, 9, 10)
- Mark Hill – bass guitar (1, 6, 9, 10, 12)
- Miles McPherson – drums (1, 6, 9, 10, 12)
- David Dorn – keyboards (1, 6, 10, 12)
- Jerry Roe – drums (2)
- Jenee Fleenor – fiddle (2)
- Dave Cohen – keyboards (2)
- Matt Dragstrem – programming (2)
- Evan Hutchings – drums (3–5, 7, 8, 11), percussion (3)
- Tim Galloway – acoustic guitar (3–5, 7, 8, 11)
- Alex Wright – keyboards (3–5, 7, 8, 11)
- Jimmie Lee Sloas – bass guitar (3, 5, 7, 8, 11)
- Justin Ostrander – electric guitar (3, 4, 7, 8, 11)
- Patrick Murphy – background vocals (4)
- Jon Mills – programming (4)

=== Technical ===
- Jody Stevens – production (all tracks), engineering (1, 4, 5), additional engineering (3)
- Jeff Stevens – production
- Matt Dragstrem – production, engineering (2)
- Julian King – engineering, digital editing
- Jon Mills – engineering (4)
- Justin Cortelyou – additional engineering (1, 3, 4, 6–12)
- Zach Kuhlman – engineering assistance (1, 3–12)
- Chip Matthews – vocal engineering (1)
- Jeff Juliano – mixing
- Nate Juliano – mixing assistance
- Nathan Dantzler – mastering
- Harrison Tate – mastering assistance
- Rose Hutcheson – production coordination
- Scott Johnson – production coordination

== Charts ==
Chart performance for Signs
| Chart (2026) | Peak position |
|---|---|
| Australian Albums (ARIA) | 65 |
| Australian Country Albums (ARIA) | 10 |
| UK Album Downloads (Official Charts) | 33 |
| UK Country Albums (Official Charts) | 4 |
| US Billboard 200 | 41 |
| US Top Country Albums (Billboard) | 8 |
