= Doin' My Thing =

Studio album by Luke Bryan
- Released: October 6, 2009
- Studio: Blackbird Studio, House of Blues, The Mix Mill and Starstruck Studios (Nashville, Tennessee)
- Genre: Country
- Length: 40:37
- Label: Capitol Records Nashville
- Producer: Jeff Stevens

Luke Bryan chronology
I'll Stay Me (2007)	Doin' My Thing (2009)	Tailgates & Tanlines (2011)

Singles from Doin' My Thing
- 1. "Do I" Released: May 4, 2009; 2. "Rain Is a Good Thing" Released: January 25, 2010; 3. "Someone Else Calling You Baby" Released: August 2, 2010

Professional ratings
Review scores
Source	Rating
AllMusic	3.5/5 stars
Country Weekly	3.5/5 stars

Doin' My Thing is the second studio album by American country music artist Luke Bryan. It was released on October 6, 2009 by Capitol Records Nashville. The album includes the singles "Do I," which peaked at number 2 on the U.S. Billboard Hot Country Songs chart, "Rain Is a Good Thing", Bryan's first number one hit on the Billboard Hot Country Songs chart, and "Someone Else Calling You Baby." Also included is a cover version of OneRepublic's "Apologize." The album has sold over a million copies in the United States by February 2016. This was Bryan’s first album to have a crossover-friendly country-pop sound, which was a departure from the neotraditional country sound of his first album.

== Content ==
"Do I" is the first single from the album. Bryan co-wrote this song with Charles Kelley and Dave Haywood of the group Lady Antebellum, whose lead singer Hillary Scott (along with Kelley and Haywood) also sings background vocals on it (but is not officially credited as a featured artist). Also included is a cover version of OneRepublic's "Apologize." Regarding the album's sound, Bryan told CMT, "We wanted to make a bigger-sounding record, something that moved a little down the road from the first record. We wanted to show my growth vocally and lyrically."

== Critical reception ==
Country Weekly critic Chris Neal gave the album three-and-a-half stars out of five, saying that it showed a country music influence in the lyrics. Neal also said that "Do I" showed "a knack for convincingly delivering hymns to thwarted love," and said that while the "Apologize" cover was "well-sung," it was not "meant to be country." Stephen Thomas Erlewine of AllMusic also gave it three-and-a-half stars, saying that it was more relaxed than I'll Stay Me. Matt Bjorke described the album favorably in his review for Roughstock, where he wrote that "Bryan doesn't have to worry about a sophomore slump as he seems to have gotten better both musically and vocally on album number two." Michael Sudhalter of Country Standard Time gave a generally positive review, saying that Bryan's songwriting seemed stronger than on the first album.

== Track listing ==
No.	Title	Writer(s)	Length
1.	"Rain Is a Good Thing"	Luke Bryan; Dallas Davidson	2:56
2.	"Doin' My Thing"	Davidson; Rhett Akins; Ben Hayslip	3:09
3.	"Do I"	Bryan; Charles Kelley; Dave Haywood	3:59
4.	"What Country Is"	Shane McAnally; Jamie Teachenor	3:14
5.	"Someone Else Calling You Baby"	Bryan; Jeff Stevens	3:49
6.	"Welcome to the Farm"	Bryan; Stevens	4:27
7.	"Apologize"	Ryan Tedder	2:51
8.	"Every Time I See You"	Bryan; Jim McCormick	4:05
9.	"Chuggin' Along"	Bryan; Rodney Clawson	2:59
10.	"I Did It Again"	Bryan; Ashley Gorley; Brent Stenzel	4:49
11.	"Drinkin' Beer and Wastin' Bullets"	Bryan; Patrick Jason Matthews	4:19

iTunes/10th Anniversary Vinyl Bonus Tracks
No.	Title	Length
12.	"Y'all Can Have This Town"	3:31
13.	"Favorite Flowers"	4:40

== Personnel ==
- Luke Bryan – vocals
- Tony Harrell – acoustic piano, organ
- Mike Rojas – acoustic piano, organ
- J.T. Corenflos – electric guitars
- Kenny Greenberg – electric guitars
- B. James Lowry – acoustic guitars
- John Willis – acoustic guitars, banjo
- Paul Franklin – pedal steel guitar
- Mike Johnson – pedal steel guitar
- Mike Brignardello – bass
- Joe Chemay – bass
- Paul Leim – drums, percussion
- Greg Morrow – drums, percussion
- Rob Hajacos – fiddle
- Joe Spivey – fiddle, mandolin
- Kirk "Jelly Roll" Johnson – harmonica
- Hillary Scott – backing vocals
- Russell Terrell – backing vocals

=== Production ===
- Jeff Stevens – producer
- Mills Logan – recording, mixing (3, 4, 7, 9, 10)
- Derek Bason – mixing (1, 2, 5, 6, 8, 11)
- Seth Morton – recording assistant
- Mike Paragone – recording assistant
- Lowell Reynolds – recording assistant
- Brien Sager – recording assistant, mix assistant (3, 4, 7, 9, 10)
- Heather Sturm – recording assistant
- Ted Wheeler – recording assistant
- Chris Ashburn – mix assistant (1, 2, 5, 6, 8, 11)
- Jed Hackett – digital editing
- Brian Kolb – digital editing
- Hank Williams – mastering at MasterMix (Nashville, Tennessee)
- Scott Johnson – producer assistant
- Joanna Carter – art direction
- Wendy Stamberger – design
- Kristin Barlowe – photography
- Michelle Hall – art production
- Debra Williams – hair, make-up
- Lee Moore – stylist
- Red Light Management – management

== Charts and certifications ==
=== Weekly charts ===
Chart (2009–2010)	Peak position
US Billboard 200	6
US Top Country Albums (Billboard)	2

=== Certifications ===
Region	Certification	Certified units/sales
United States (RIAA)	2× Platinum	2,000,000^{‡}
^{‡} Sales+streaming figures based on certification alone.

=== Year-end charts ===
Chart (2009)	Position
US Top Country Albums (Billboard)	51
Chart (2010)	Position
US Billboard 200	91
US Top Country Albums (Billboard)	14
Chart (2011)	Position
US Top Country Albums (Billboard)	68

=== Singles ===
Year	Single	Peak chart positions		
Year	Single	US Country	US	CAN
2009	"Do I"	2	34	66
2010	"Rain Is a Good Thing"	1	37	57
2010	"Someone Else Calling You Baby"	1	56	84
