= We Rode in Trucks =

"We Rode In Trucks"

Single by Luke Bryan

from the album I'll Stay Me
- Released: October 22, 2007
- Recorded: 2007
- Genre: Country
- Length: 4:30 (album version); 3:54 (single edit)
- Label: Capitol Nashville
- Songwriters: Roger Murrah; Jim McCormick; Luke Bryan
- Producer: Jeff Stevens

Luke Bryan singles chronology
| "All My Friends Say" (2007) | "We Rode In Trucks" (2007) | "Country Man" (2008) |

"We Rode In Trucks" is a song co-written and recorded by American country music artist Luke Bryan. It was released in October 2007 as the second single from his debut album I'll Stay Me. Bryan co-wrote this song with Roger Murrah and Jim McCormick.

== Content ==
In the first verse, the narrator describes where he lived as a young man, and the activities he engaged in, such as picking cotton and pig wrestling. The woman he is addressing also lived on a farm, and "rode in trucks." In the second verse, he describes things she learned at that age, such as kissing and fighting. The speaker then imagines driving down a back road in his truck. In the third and final verse, the narrator describes new changes in his life. Bryan told Billboard the song is a "tribute to growing up in rural America."

== Critical reception ==
Matt C. of Engine 145 gave the song a "thumbs up" rating, describing the song as the "finest example of a nostalgic song" that he has heard since Alan Jackson’s "Remember When." and that the song contains many lines with "elegant simplicity and are delivered with evocative sincerity." Kevin John Coyne of Country Universe gave the song a B grade, calling it a nostalgic song but a similar theme "has been covered this year with greater effect by Miranda Lambert and Rodney Atkins."

== Music video ==
The video shows Bryan singing the song at a swamp in Georgia. It was directed by Shaun Silva and premiered in late 2007.

== Chart performance ==
The song debuted on the Billboard Hot Country Songs chart at number 60 for the week of November 3, 2007. It peaked at number 33 on that chart in February 2008, becoming Bryan's lowest-peaking single to date. It would also be his only single to miss the top 10 until fourteen years later, when "Up" peaked at number 21 in 2022.

| Chart (2007–2008) | Peak position |
|---|---|
| US Hot Country Songs (Billboard) | 33 |

== Certifications ==
| Region | Certification | Certified units/sales |
|---|---|---|
| United States (RIAA) | Gold | 500,000^{‡} |
^{‡} Sales+streaming figures based on certification alone.
