= I'll Stay Me =

Studio album by Luke Bryan
- Released: August 14, 2007
- Studio: Ocean Way Nashville and Donna Mae's Studio (Nashville, Tennessee)
- Genre: Country
- Length: 41:00
- Label: Capitol Records Nashville
- Producer: Jeff Stevens

Luke Bryan chronology
I'll Stay Me (2007)	Doin' My Thing (2009)

Singles from I'll Stay Me
- 1. "All My Friends Say" Released: January 22, 2007; 2. "We Rode in Trucks" Released: October 22, 2007; 3. "Country Man" Released: March 24, 2008

I'll Stay Me is the debut studio album by American country music artist Luke Bryan. The album was released on August 14, 2007 by Capitol Records Nashville. The album produced three singles with "All My Friends Say", "We Rode in Trucks", and "Country Man". The album has been certified gold by the Recording Industry Association of America (RIAA).

== Content ==
Prior to signing with Capitol Records as a recording artist, Luke Bryan co-wrote Billy Currington's late 2006-early 2007 single "Good Directions".

Bryan made his debut as a singer with the single "All My Friends Say". Released in 2007, it peaked at number five on the Billboard country music charts. Bryan co-wrote the song with Lonnie Wilson and Jeff Stevens, the latter of whom also produced the album. Following as singles were "We Rode in Trucks" and "Country Man". "We Rode in Trucks" is Bryan's lowest-charting single, reaching number 33 on Hot Country Songs. "Country Man" peaked at number ten.

== Critical reception ==
Professional ratings
Review scores
Source	Rating
AllMusic	3/5 stars
Country Standard Time	favorable

Thom Jurek of AllMusic rated the album three stars out of five, stating that "Despite the calculating, swing for the fences nature of Bryan's debut, he is genuinely gifted, and executes nearly flawlessly." Michael Sudhalter of Country Standard Time gave the album a mostly positive review, stating that Bryan "proves his versatility on an album that combines twangy vocals and fiddles with catchy melodies."

== Track listing ==
All tracks are written by Luke Bryan, with additional co-writers as noted, except "Pray About Everything" (written by Jeff Stevens and Bob Regan).

No.	Title	Writer(s)	Length
1.	"All My Friends Say"	Lonnie Wilson; Stevens	4:02
2.	"Baby's on the Way"	Stevens	3:20
3.	"The Car in Front of Me"	Jim McBride	3:40
4.	"Pray About Everything"		3:16
5.	"We Rode in Trucks"	Jim McCormick; Roger Murrah	4:30
6.	"I'll Stay Me"	Stevens	3:02
7.	"First Love Song"	Stevens	4:36
8.	"Country Man"	Galen Griffin; Patrick Jason Matthews	3:10
9.	"Over the River"	Jay Knowles	3:53
10.	"You Make Me Want To"	Amber White; Phillip White	3:29
11.	"Tackle Box"	Joe Doyle	4:02

== Personnel ==
- Luke Bryan – lead vocals
- John Barlow Jarvis – acoustic piano, organ
- Gordon Mote – acoustic piano, organ
- Mike Rojas – acoustic piano, Wurlitzer electric piano, organ
- J. T. Corenflos – electric guitars, baritone guitar
- Jeff King – electric guitars
- B. James Lowry – acoustic guitars
- Mike Johnson – dobro, pedal steel guitar
- Mike Brignardello – bass guitar, tic tac bass
- Paul Leim – drums, percussion
- Joe Spivey – fiddle, mandolin
- Russell Terrell – backing vocals

=== Production ===
- Jeff Stevens – producer
- Herb Tassin – recording, mixing
- Jay Fenstermaker – recording assistant, mix assistant
- Bryan Graban – recording assistant, mix assistant
- Taylor Pollert – recording assistant, mix assistant
- Jim DeMain – mastering at Yes Master (Nashville, Tennessee)
- Scott Johnson – production assistant
- Joanna Carter – art direction
- Lee Wright – design
- Denise Arguijo – art production
- Michelle Hall – art production
- Colourworks – digital imaging
- Jeremy Cowart – photography
- Michelle Babbitt – hair, make-up
- Lee Moore – stylist
- Kerri Edwards and Greg Hill at Red Light Management – management

== Chart performance ==
=== Weekly charts ===
Chart (2007)	Peak position
US Billboard 200	24
US Top Country Albums (Billboard)	2

=== Year-end charts ===
Chart (2008)	Position
US Top Country Albums (Billboard)	57

=== Singles ===
Year	Single	Peak chart positions	
Year	Single	US Country	US
2007	"All My Friends Say"	5	59
2007	"We Rode in Trucks"	33	—
2008	"Country Man"	10	74
"—" denotes releases that did not chart

== Certifications ==
Region	Certification	Certified units/sales
United States (RIAA)	Platinum	1,000,000^{‡}
^{‡} Sales+streaming figures based on certification alone.
