= Rain Is a Good Thing =

Single by Luke Bryan

from the album Doin' My Thing
- Released: January 25, 2010
- Recorded: 2009
- Genre: Country
- Length: 2:56
- Label: Capitol Nashville
- Songwriters: Luke Bryan; Dallas Davidson
- Producer: Jeff Stevens

Luke Bryan singles chronology
"Do I" (2009)	"Rain Is a Good Thing" (2010)	"Someone Else Calling You Baby" (2010)

"Rain Is a Good Thing" is a song co-written and recorded by American country music artist Luke Bryan. It was released in January 2010 as the second single from his 2009 album Doin' My Thing. The song became Bryan's first number one hit on the US Billboard Hot Country Songs chart for the weeks of July 24 and 31, 2010. Bryan wrote this song with Dallas Davidson.

== Content ==
"Rain Is a Good Thing" is an up-tempo tune in which the narrator explains how rain can affect life by facilitating the growth of corn, which in turn is processed into whiskey, which in turn causes his significant other to "feel a little frisky."

Bryan told The Boot that he and co-writer Dallas Davidson "used to have the saying, 'Rain makes corn, and corn makes whiskey,' and it was just something we always said. If we were a little bummed out about the rain […] we'd be like, 'Well, rain makes corn, and corn makes whiskey,' and that would kind of make us feel a little better about it […] We didn't start with 'Rain Is a Good Thing' as a title and wrote to it. We just started with 'rain makes corn, and corn makes whiskey' and we kind of arrived at 'Rain Is a Good Thing.'"

The song is set in the key of E Major, with Bryan's vocals ranging from B_{2} to G♯_{4}.

== Critical reception ==
Matt Bjorke of Roughstock stated that the song "spins the old 'where I'm from' lyric into a much more pliable song chock full of that charm."

== Charitable contribution ==
Bryan appeared on an episode of the 2010 season of Celebrity Apprentice. He, along with singer Emily West, were presented as up-and-coming artists in need of an image makeover. The two teams on the show each took on one singer in an attempt to help them become more marketable. Bryan performed "Rain is a Good Thing" on the program. The winner of the challenge was Cyndi Lauper, whose charity (The True Colors Fund, which advocates for gay and lesbian rights) received 20% of all sales of the single.

== Music video ==
The accompanying music video for the song, directed by Shaun Silva, was released on iTunes on February 9, 2010. The video was filmed on October 5, 2009 at a concert at Hurricane Plantation in Claxton, Georgia.

== Chart performance ==
The song debuted on the Billboard Hot Country Songs chart at number 60 for the week of January 23, 2010. On the chart dated for July 24, 2010, it became Bryan's first number one single on the Hot Country Songs chart.

Chart (2010)	Peak position
Canada Hot 100 (Billboard)	57
Canada Country (Billboard)	3
US Billboard Hot 100	37
US Hot Country Songs (Billboard)	1

=== Year-end charts ===
Chart (2010)	Position
US Country Songs (Billboard)	2

== Certifications ==
Region	Certification	Certified units/sales
Canada (Music Canada)	Gold	40,000^{*}
United States (RIAA)	3× Platinum	3,000,000^{‡}
^{*} Sales figures based on certification alone.^{‡} Sales+streaming figures based on certification alone.
