= Country On =

Single by Luke Bryan

from the album Mind of a Country Boy
- Released: July 5, 2022
- Genre: Country
- Length: 3:57
- Label: Capitol Nashville
- Songwriters: Mark Nesler; David Frasier; Mitch Oglesby; Styles Haury
- Producers: Jeff Stevens; Jody Stevens

Luke Bryan singles chronology
"Up" (2021)	"Country On" (2022)	"But I Got a Beer in My Hand" (2023)

"Country On" is a song by American country music singer Luke Bryan, which is his 30th number one song on country radio. It was released on July 5, 2022, as the lead single to Bryan's eighth studio album, Mind of a Country Boy.

== Content ==
"Country On" was co-written by Mark Nesler, David Frasier, Mitch Oglesby, and Styles Haury, and produced by Jeff Stevens and his son Jody. It was released in July 2022 as the lead single to Bryan's upcoming eighth studio album. On the song's lyrical themes, Bryan told the blog Music Mayhem, "It's got patriotism in it, it's got honoring people that keep us free and people that keep us safe and look after us. I think that's something the Country music crowd is always very, very appreciative of because so many in Country music are those people." The end of the song features a backing vocal from Sarah Buxton.

The song is described by Taste of Country as a "country rock anthem" with a lyrical theme of support for blue-collar workers. In addition to the song's release to radio, Bryan released a music video on August 15, 2022. Included in the video is footage of real-life firefighters, police officers, military members, and cowboys.

== Charts ==
=== Weekly charts ===
Weekly chart performance for "Country On"
Chart (2022)	Peak position
Canada Hot 100 (Billboard)	80
Canada Country (Billboard)	7
US Billboard Hot 100	72
US Country Airplay (Billboard)	3
US Hot Country Songs (Billboard)	15

=== Year-end charts ===
2022 year-end chart performance for "Country On"
Chart (2022)	Position
US Country Airplay (Billboard)	50
US Hot Country Songs (Billboard)	63

2023 year-end chart performance for "Country On"
Chart (2023)	Position
US Hot Country Songs (Billboard)	98
