= Waves (Luke Bryan song) =

2021 single by Luke Bryan

Single by Luke Bryan

from the album Born Here Live Here Die Here
- Released: April 12, 2021
- Genre: Country
- Length: 3:48
- Label: Capitol Nashville; Row Crop
- Songwriters: Chase McGill; Ryan Hurd; Zach Crowell
- Producers: Jeff Stevens; Jody Stevens

Luke Bryan singles chronology
"Down to One" (2020)	"Waves" (2021)	"Buy Dirt" (2021)

Music video
- "Waves" on YouTube

"Waves" is a song recorded by American country music artist Luke Bryan, it was released as the fifth single on April 12, 2021, from the deluxe version of his seventh studio album Born Here Live Here Die Here. The song was written by Chase McGill, Ryan Hurd and Zach Crowell, and produced by Jeff Stevens and Jody Stevens. “Waves” was certified “Gold” July 2022, crossing 500,000 units sold.

== Content ==
In a press release, Bryan explained: "'Waves' is a song about kids falling in love during the summer and just all the images and everything about how beautiful that summer love is and how the emotions just keep coming in waves, 'Waves' is kind of a play on words, and I fell in love with the song the second I heard it."

== Critical reception ==
Billy Dukes of Taste of Country called "Waves" a serious romance song with a more creative melody than Bryan's previous single "Sunrise, Sunburn, Sunset", which was also written by McGill, Hurd and Crowell.

== Music video ==
The music video was released on April 9, 2021, directed by Dano Cerny. It was filmed on the beach in Malibu, California.

== Live performance ==
On May 16, 2021, Bryan performed the song on American Idol, on which he serves as a judge.

== Charts ==
=== Weekly charts ===
Weekly chart performance for "Waves"
Chart (2021)	Peak position
Australia Country Hot 50 (TMN)	7
Canada Hot 100 (Billboard)	56
Canada Country (Billboard)	1
US Billboard Hot 100	24
US Country Airplay (Billboard)	1
US Hot Country Songs (Billboard)	2

=== Year-end charts ===
Year-end chart performance for "Waves"
Chart (2021)	Position
US Country Airplay (Billboard)	11
US Hot Country Songs (Billboard)	27

== Certifications ==
Certifications for Waves
Region	Certification	Certified units/sales
United States (RIAA)	Gold	500,000^{‡}
^{‡} Sales+streaming figures based on certification alone.
