= Up (Luke Bryan song) =

2021 single by Luke Bryan

Single by Luke Bryan

from the album Born Here Live Here Die Here
- Released: October 11, 2021
- Genre: Country
- Length: 3:03
- Label: Capitol Nashville
- Songwriters: Jeremy Bussey; Taylor Phillips; Bobby Pinson
- Producers: Jeff Stevens; Jody Stevens

Luke Bryan singles chronology
"Buy Dirt" (2021)	"Up" (2021)	"Country On" (2022)

Music video
- Up on YouTube

"Up" is a song recorded by American country music artist Luke Bryan. It was included exclusively on the deluxe edition of Born Here Live Here Die Here and released as its sixth and final single on October 11, 2021. The song was written by Jeremy Bussey, Taylor Phillips and Bobby Pinson, and produced by Jeff Stevens and Jody Stevens.

== Background ==
Cillea Houghton of The Boot described "Up" as "a farmer's anthem that speaks to the heart of rural America while painting a picture of what it's like to live there and devote your life to farming". Bryan also stated in an interview with The Boot that the song is "a story of how you're looking up to God to get you through in this".

== Content ==
Bryan stated in a press release: "'Up' is a song that just checks all the boxes for a country song to me. It talks about what I love and what's dear to me. About my home and my faith. Add to that the fact that the songwriters used just a simple word as 'up,' to create so many images is pretty special". The music video for "Up" is now live on YouTube.

== Critical reception ==
Robert K Oermann of Music Row called the song "Beautifully produced, with airy, echoey space around Luke's vocal. The melodic song holds snapshots of simple country living. Faith is the key. An endearing single with a new sonic direction for this superstar". Annie Parnell of Taste of Country commented that the song "take[s] a nostalgic look back at a rural childhood, and expresses Bryan's enduring faith".

== Commercial performance ==
"Up" peaked at number 21 on the Billboard Country Airplay chart in March 2022, becoming Bryan's lowest-peaking single and his first to miss the top 10 since "We Rode in Trucks" peaked at number 33 in February 2008, ending a streak of 29 consecutive top 10 singles.

== Charts ==
=== Weekly charts ===
Chart performance for "Up"
Chart (2021–2022)	Peak position
Canada Country (Billboard)	23
US Country Airplay (Billboard)	21
US Hot Country Songs (Billboard)	33

=== Year-end charts ===
2022 year-end chart performance for "Up"
Chart (2022)	Position
US Hot Country Songs (Billboard)	90

== Release history ==
Release history for "Up"
Region	Date	Format	Label	Ref.
Various	April 9, 2021	Digital download; streaming	Capitol Nashville	
United States	October 11, 2021	Country radio	Capitol Nashville	
