= Knockin' Boots (Luke Bryan song) =

Single by Luke Bryan

from the album Born Here Live Here Die Here
- Released: April 8, 2019
- Genre: Country
- Length: 3:19
- Label: Capitol Nashville; Row Crop
- Songwriters: Jon Nite; Hillary Lindsey; Gordie Sampson
- Producers: Jeff Stevens; Jody Stevens

Luke Bryan singles chronology
| "What Makes You Country" (2018) | "Knockin' Boots" (2019) | "What She Wants Tonight" (2019) |

"Knockin' Boots" is a song recorded by American country music singer Luke Bryan. It was released on April 8, 2019 as the lead-off single to his seventh studio album Born Here Live Here Die Here, released on August 7, 2020.

== Content ==
"Knockin' Boots" was written by Jon Nite, Hillary Lindsey, and Gordie Sampson, and produced by his longtime producing team of Jeff Stevens and Jody Stevens.

== Music video ==
The music video for the song premiered on June 28, 2019 and was directed by Issac Rentz and filmed at the Cowboy Palace Saloon in LA. In it, Luke is shown performing at an open-air bar with a full band for a crowd of people who, in the beginning are very tired and worn out, eventually end up dancing while he sings.

== Chart performance ==
"Knockin' Boots" debuted at number 48 on the Billboard Country Airplay chart dated April 6, 2019, and at number 25 on the Billboard Hot Country Songs chart dated April 13, 2019. The song was certified Gold by the RIAA on August 16, 2019. It has sold 243,000 copies in the United States as of November 2019.

== Charts ==
=== Weekly charts ===
| Chart (2019) | Peak position |
|---|---|
| Canada Hot 100 (Billboard) | 30 |
| Canada Country (Billboard) | 2 |
| US Billboard Hot 100 | 31 |
| US Country Airplay (Billboard) | 1 |
| US Hot Country Songs (Billboard) | 2 |
| US Rolling Stone Top 100 | 29 |

=== Year-end charts ===
| Chart (2019) | Position |
|---|---|
| Canada (Canadian Hot 100) | 62 |
| US Billboard Hot 100 | 79 |
| US Country Airplay (Billboard) | 6 |
| US Hot Country Songs (Billboard) | 9 |

== Certifications ==
| Region | Certification | Certified units/sales |
|---|---|---|
| Canada (Music Canada) | 4× Platinum | 320,000^{‡} |
| New Zealand (RMNZ) | Gold | 15,000^{‡} |
| United States (RIAA) | 3× Platinum | 3,000,000^{‡} |
^{‡} Sales+streaming figures based on certification alone.
