= Do I =

Single by Luke Bryan

from the album Doin' My Thing
- Released: May 4, 2009
- Recorded: 2009
- Genre: Country
- Length: 3:57
- Label: Capitol Nashville
- Songwriters: Luke Bryan; Dave Haywood; Charles Kelley
- Producer: Jeff Stevens

Luke Bryan singles chronology
"Country Man" (2008)	"Do I" (2009)	"Rain Is a Good Thing" (2010)

"Do I" is a song co-written and recorded by American country music artist Luke Bryan. It was released in May 2009 as the lead-off single from his album Doin' My Thing. Bryan co-wrote the song with Dave Haywood and Charles Kelley of the group Lady Antebellum, whose co-lead singer Hillary Scott is featured on background vocals. "Do I" is about a couple questioning the status of their relationship.

The song received mixed reviews from critics wary of Bryan's delivery in the lyrics. "Do I" peaked at number 2 on both the Billboard Country Airplay and Hot Country Songs charts respectively, both times behind Lady A's own song "Need You Now". It also gave Bryan his first top 40 hit on the Hot 100 chart, charting at number 34. The song was certified 4× Platinum by the Recording Industry Association of America, and has sold 1,755,000 copies in that country as of March 2019. The song also charted in Canada, peaking at number 66 on the Canadian Hot 100 chart.

An accompanying music video for the song, directed by Shaun Silva, is set in a high rise condominium where Bryan contemplates his relationship with his girlfriend.

== Content ==
Bryan told CMT that, "the song is about a couple that doesn't know if their worlds are right with each other, or they don't know how their relationship's going down hill".

The song is in the key of A major, with Bryan's vocals ranging from C♯_{3} to F♯_{4}.

== Critical reception ==
Stephen M. Deusner of Engine 145 gave the song a thumbs-down. Although he described the lyrics favorably by saying that "the scenario is all the more affecting for its mundanity" and "'Do I' implies no hint of a happily ever after, and that ambiguity gives the lyrics extra impact", Deusner criticized Bryan's vocal performance, saying "it never quite conveys much desperation or despair. There’s no worry in his voice, nor does it sound like he’s trying to keep a stoic front." Chris Neal of Country Weekly described the song favorably in his review of the album, saying that it "shows a knack for convincingly delivering hymns to thwarted love."

== Commercial performance ==
"Do I" debuted on the U.S. Billboard Hot Country Songs chart at number 53 for the chart week of May 9, 2009. In November 2009, the song became his first top 40 on the Billboard Hot 100 chart. The song has sold 1,755,000 copies in the U.S. as of March 2019.

== Music video ==
The music video was directed by Shaun Silva and was filmed in a high rise condominium in downtown Nashville. It features Luke Bryan dealing with the relationship with his girlfriend. It premiered on Amazon.com on June 29, 2009.

== Charts and certifications ==
=== Weekly charts ===
Chart (2009–2010)	Peak position
Canada Hot 100 (Billboard)	66
Canada Country (Billboard)	4
US Country Airplay (Billboard)	2
US Hot Country Songs (Billboard)	2
US Billboard Hot 100	34

=== Year-end charts ===
Chart (2009)	Position
US Country Songs (Billboard)	41
Chart (2010)	Position
US Country Songs (Billboard)	59

=== Certifications ===
Region	Certification	Certified units/sales
United States (RIAA)	5× Platinum	5,000,000^{‡}
^{‡} Sales+streaming figures based on certification alone.
