= All My Friends Say =

Single by Luke Bryan

from the album I'll Stay Me
- Released: January 22, 2007
- Recorded: 2006
- Genre: Country
- Length: 4:02 (album version); 3:45 (single edit)
- Label: Capitol Nashville
- Songwriters: Jeff Stevens; Lonnie Wilson; Luke Bryan
- Producer: Jeff Stevens

Luke Bryan singles chronology
"All My Friends Say" (2007)	"We Rode in Trucks" (2007)

"All My Friends Say" is a song co-written and recorded by American country music artist Luke Bryan. It originally appeared on his 2006 self-titled EP, and was released in January 2007 as his debut single and the first for his 2007 debut album I'll Stay Me. The song became Bryan's first chart entry, spending more than 30 weeks on US Billboard Hot Country Songs chart, where it reached a peak of number 5. The song also crossed over to the Billboard Hot 100 chart, reaching 59. Bryan co-wrote this song with Jeff Stevens and Lonnie Wilson.

== Content ==
This up-tempo country-rock song tells the story of a man who has just woken up after a night of drinking at a bar, unable to remember what he had been doing in that bar and unaware of how he arrived home. In an attempt to find out what happened, he asks several of his friends, all of whom tell him that he began drinking heavily upon seeing his former lover with another man.

Regarding the song, Bryan said, "It's one of those songs that people just seem to relate to when they hear it. It's about waking up in a rocking chair somewhere and wondering what in the heck went on the night before. It's about seeing your ex in a bar with someone new... We've all been there and had those kinds of experiences."

== Music video ==
The music video was directed by Shaun Silva and premiered in January 11, 2007.

== Critical reception ==
Kevin John Coyne of Country Universe gave the song a B grade. He said the only problem with the song is the production. He said that "it tries a little too hard to show 'attitude', and ends up making Bryan’s vocal sound more timid than it actually is."

Billboard and American Songwriter ranked "All My Friends Say" at number three and number nine, respectively, on their lists of the 10 greatest Luke Bryan songs.

== Chart performance ==
"All My Friends Say" debuted at number 59 on the U.S. Billboard Hot Country Songs chart for the week of February 10, 2007. On the Billboard Hot 100 chart for the week of August 18, 2007, the song debuted at number 90.

Chart (2007)	Peak position
Canada Country (Billboard)	21
US Billboard Hot 100	59
US Hot Country Songs (Billboard)	5

=== Year-end charts ===
Chart (2007)	Position
US Country Songs (Billboard)	31

== Certifications ==
Region	Certification	Certified units/sales
United States (RIAA)	2× Platinum	2,000,000^{‡}
^{‡} Sales+streaming figures based on certification alone.
