= Born Here Live Here Die Here =

Studio album by Luke Bryan
- Released: August 7, 2020
- Studios: Ocean Way Nashville, The Tracking Room, Starstruck Studios and The Office (Nashville, Tennessee)
- Genre: Country
- Length: 33:44
- Label: Capitol Records Nashville
- Producers: Jeff Stevens; Jody Stevens

Luke Bryan chronology
What Makes You Country (2017)	Born Here Live Here Die Here (2020)	Mind of a Country Boy (2024)

Singles from Born Here Live Here Die Here
- 1. "Knockin' Boots" Released: April 8, 2019; 2. "What She Wants Tonight" Released: October 24, 2019; 3. "One Margarita" Released: April 13, 2020; 4. "Down to One" Released: October 19, 2020

"Born Here Live Here Die Here (Deluxe Edition)"
- Cover for deluxe edition.

Singles from Born Here Live Here Die Here (Deluxe Edition)
- 1. "Waves" Released: April 12, 2021; 2. "Up" Released: October 11, 2021

Born Here Live Here Die Here is the seventh studio album by American country music artist Luke Bryan. It was released on August 7, 2020 by Capitol Records Nashville. The album includes the singles "Knockin' Boots", "What She Wants Tonight", "One Margarita", and "Down to One". A deluxe edition with six extra songs, including the album's fifth single "Waves" and its sixth single, "Up", was released on April 9, 2021.

The album debuted at number five on the US Billboard 200 and number one on the US Top Country Albums charts, earning 65,000 album-equivalent units (of which 48,000 were pure album sales) in its first week.

== Background ==
"Knockin' Boots" was released on April 8, 2019 as the debut single from Bryan's seventh studio album. "What She Wants Tonight" was released on October 24, 2019 as the second single. In January 2020 during an Instagram Live video, Bryan announced the name of the album would be Born Here Live Here Die Here. In February 2020, Bryan released the title track, the album's track listing and announced it would be released on April 24, 2020. On March 13, 2020, "One Margarita" was released, and it would later be sent to country radio on April 13, 2020, after Capitol Nashville and Bryan postponed the album's release to August 7, 2020, due to the COVID-19 pandemic. On June 12, 2020, Bryan released the track "Build Me a Daddy" along with a music video for the song.

== Commercial performance ==
Born Here Live Here Die Here debuted at number five on the US Billboard 200 chart, earning 65,000 album-equivalent units (of which 48,000 were pure album sales) in its first week. This became Bryan's eleventh US top-ten album. The album also debuted at number one on the US Top Country Albums chart, becoming Bryan's ninth number one album on this chart.

== Track listing ==
Born Here Live Here Die Here track listing
No.	Title	Writer(s)	Length
1.	"Knockin' Boots"	Hillary Lindsey; Jon Nite; Gordie Sampson	3:20
2.	"What She Wants Tonight"	Luke Bryan; Ross Copperman; Lindsey; Nite	3:07
3.	"Born Here Live Here Die Here"	Jake Mitchell; Jameson Rodgers; Josh Thompson	3:46
4.	"One Margarita"	Michael Carter; Matt Dragstrem; Thompson	3:13
5.	"Too Drunk to Drive"	Bryan; Carter; Brandon Kinney	3:27
6.	"Build Me a Daddy"	Mitchell; Thompson; Brett Tyler	3:09
7.	"Little Less Broken"	Carter; Lindsay Rimes; Matt Rogers	3:19
8.	"For a Boat"	Randy Montana; Thompson; Mike Walker	3:29
9.	"Where Are We Goin'"	Bryan; Brent Cobb	3:13
10.	"Down to One"	Dallas Davidson; Justin Ebach; Kyle Fishman	3:41
Total length:			33:44

Deluxe edition
No.	Title	Writer(s)	Length
11.	"Country Does"	Copperman; Josh Osborne; Shane McAnally	3:48
12.	"Drink a Little Whiskey Down"	Bryan; Dragstrem; Thompson	3:16
13.	"Waves"	Zach Crowell; Ryan Hurd; Chase McGill	3:48
14.	"Bill Dance"	Bryan; Rhett Akins; Davidson; Ben Hayslip	3:48
15.	"Up"	Jeremy Bussey; Taylor Phillips; Bobby Pinson	3:03
16.	"Floatin' This Creek"	Bryan; McGill; Jeff Stevens; Jody Stevens	3:24
Total length:			54:51

== Personnel ==
Credits adapted from Tidal.

Musicians

- Luke Bryan – vocals
- David Dorn – keyboards (1, 3, 10)
- Jody Stevens – programming (1, 2, 4, 11–14, 16), acoustic guitar (2), electric guitar (2, 6, 7, 14), banjo (14), bass (14)
- Charlie Judge – keyboards (2, 4–9, 11–13, 15, 16), Hammond B3 organ (13, 14), Wurlitzer electric piano (14)
- Kyle Fishman – programming (10)
- Adam Shoenfeld – electric guitar
- Rob McNelley – electric guitar (1–4, 8, 10, 12, 15, 16)
- John Willis – acoustic guitar (1, 3, 10), mandolin (1)
- Ilya Toshinskiy – acoustic guitar (2, 4–9, 11–16), banjo (11)
- J. T. Corenflos – electric guitar (3, 10)
- Derek Wells – electric guitar (5, 7, 9)
- Jake Mitchell – electric guitar (6)
- Justin Ostrander – electric guitar (11, 13, 14)
- Eddy Dunlap – pedal steel guitar (3, 5, 6), dobro (16)
- Mark Hill – bass (1–13, 15, 16)
- Greg Morrow – drums (1, 3, 10)
- Evan Hutchings – drums (2, 4–9, 11–13, 15, 16), percussion (11)
- Kirk "Jellyroll" Johnson – harmonica (16)
- Perry Coleman – backing vocals (1–6, 8, 10–16)
- Matt Rogers – backing vocals (7)
- Chancie Neal – backing vocals (9)

Production and Technical

- Brian Wright – A&R
- Jeff Stevens – producer
- Jody Stevens – producer
- Derek Bason – recording, mixing
- Chris Small – recording assistant, digital editing, mix assistant (11–16)
- Adam Ayan – mastering at Gateway Mastering (Portland, Maine)
- Scott Johnson – production coordinator
- Sarah Marie Burke – A&R production
- Karen Naff – art direction
- Wendy Stamberger – art direction, design
- Jim Wright – photography
- Kera Jackson – art production
- Lee Moore – wardrobe stylist
- Paula Turner – grooming
- Kerri Edwards with KPentertainment and Red Light Management – management

== Charts ==
=== Weekly charts ===
Weekly chart performance for Born Here Live Here Die Here
Chart (2020)	Peak position
Australian Albums (ARIA)	2
Australian Country Albums (ARIA)	1
Canadian Albums (Billboard)	5
Scottish Albums (Official Charts)	32
Swiss Albums (Schweizer Hitparade)	14
UK Country Albums (Official Charts)	3
US Billboard 200	5
US Top Album Sales (Billboard)	2
US Top Country Albums (Billboard)	1

=== Year-end charts ===
2020 year-end chart performance for Born Here Live Here Die Here
Chart (2020)	Position
Australian Top Country Albums (ARIA)	10
US Top Country Albums (Billboard)	39

2021 year-end chart performance for Born Here Live Here Die Here
Chart (2021)	Position
US Billboard 200	139
US Top Country Albums (Billboard)	9

2022 year-end chart performance for Born Here Live Here Die Here
Chart (2022)	Position
US Top Country Albums (Billboard)	52

== Certifications ==
Certifications for Born Here Live Here Die Here
Region	Certification	Certified units/sales
Canada (Music Canada)	Platinum	80,000^{‡}
United States (RIAA)	Platinum	1,000,000^{‡}
^{‡} Sales+streaming figures based on certification alone.
