= Luke Bryan =

American country singer and songwriter (born 1976)

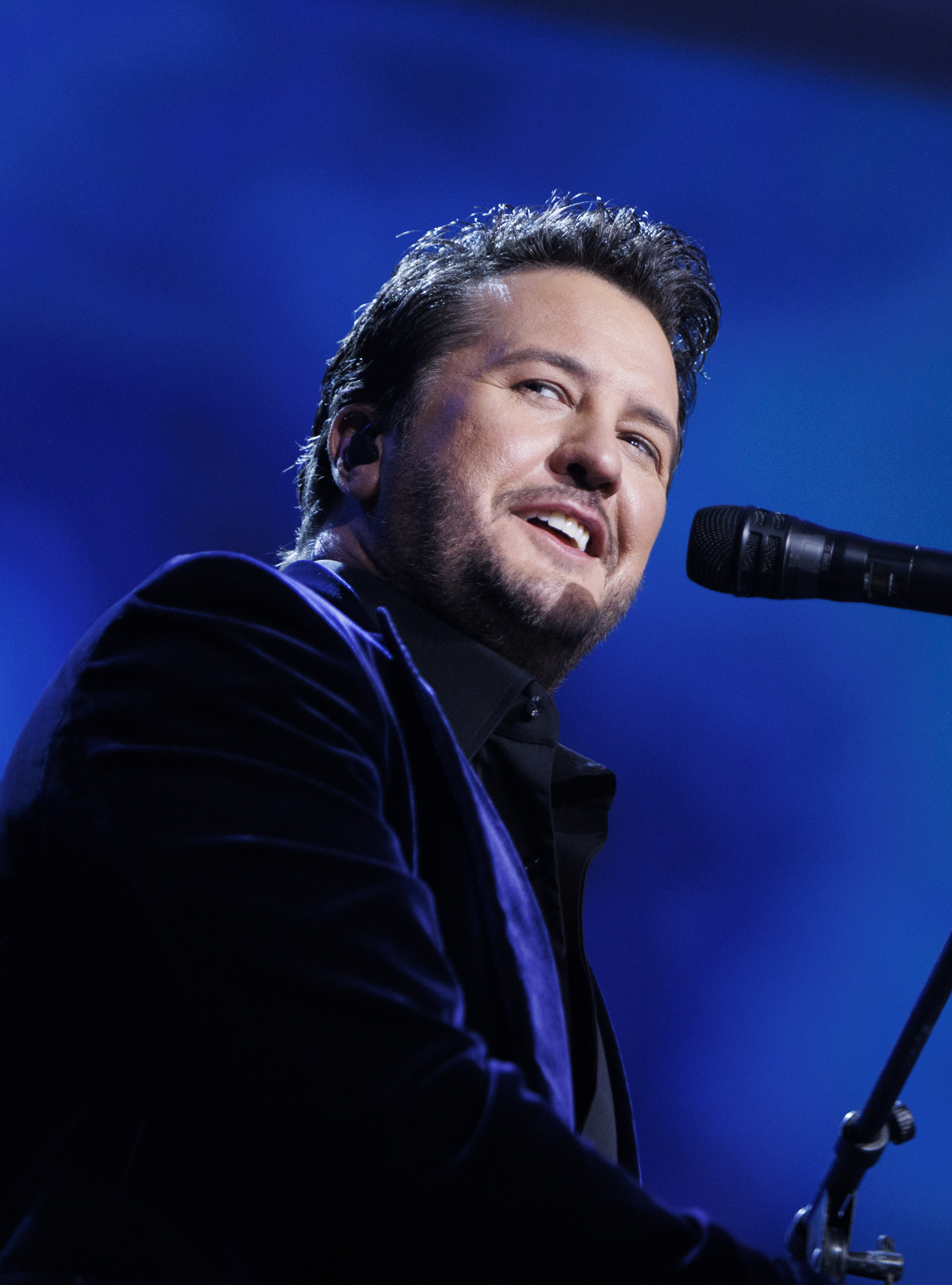
- Bryan in 2022
- Born: Thomas Luther Bryan; July 17, 1976 (age 50); Edison, Georgia, U.S.
- Education: Georgia Southern University (BBA)
- Occupations: Singer; songwriter; television personality
- Spouse: Caroline Boyer (m. 2006)
- Children: 2
- Musical career
- Origin: Nashville, Tennessee, U.S.
- Genres: Country; country pop; country rock
- Instruments: Vocals; guitar; piano
- Works: Luke Bryan discography
- Years active: 2001–present
- Labels: Capitol Nashville; Row Crop
- Website: lukebryan.com

Thomas Luther "Luke" Bryan (born July 17, 1976) is an American country music singer and songwriter. He is one of the world's best-selling music artists, with over 75 million records sold, and is a five-time "Entertainer of the Year", being awarded by both the Academy of Country Music Awards and the Country Music Association. In 2019, his 2013 album Crash My Party received the first Album of the Decade award from the Academy of Country Music. Since 2018, Bryan has been a judge on the singing competition television show American Idol.

Bryan's first ten albums – I'll Stay Me (2007), Doin' My Thing (2009), Tailgates & Tanlines (2011), Crash My Party (2013), Spring Break...Here to Party (2013), Spring Break...Checkin' Out (2015), Kill the Lights (2015), Farm Tour... Here's to the Farmer (2016), What Makes You Country (2017), and Born Here Live Here Die Here (2020) – have included 30 number-one hits. Bryan often co-writes with Jeff Stevens.

== Early life ==
Luke Bryan was born in Leesburg, Georgia, to LeClaire and Thomas "Tommy" Bryan, who owned a peanut farm. He had an older sister, Kelly and an older brother, Chris.

Bryan grew up in Leesburg, Georgia and was active in sports and demonstrated musical aptitude at an early age. He drew inspiration from Elvis Presley, Michael Jackson, and country artists such as George Strait, Alabama, and Ronnie Milsap, who inspired him to learn to play piano.

His first job was at a local grocery store. He attended Lee County District High School, where he was involved in both sports and theatre. His teachers recognized his musical ability and stage presence and encouraged him to pursue musical theatre upon graduation.

Shortly before moving to Nashville at age 19 to pursue a music career, Bryan's elder brother Chris was killed in a car accident. His mother has stated: "We knew Luke at some point would come to Nashville," his mother said. "But ... you can't leave your family, and ... I couldn't bear the thought of him being away."

Bryan instead went to college at Georgia Southern University in Statesboro, Georgia, where he joined the Sigma Chi fraternity and he briefly dated his future wife, Caroline Boyer. He graduated in 1999 with a bachelor's degree in Business Administration. Bryan reconnected with Boyer several years later when he was performing at a bar in Statesboro, when she was in town, later resuming their relationship and eventually marrying.

During his undergraduate education, and following graduation, Bryan worked on his father’s peanut mill and performed local shows with a band he formed with friends called “Neyami Road.” Two years later, at his father’s encouragement, Bryan moved to Nashville to pursue a music career. He initially gained success as a songwriter, co-writing Billy Currington’s 2006 hit "Good Directions", which was a number one hit on the U.S. Billboard Hot Country Songs chart for three weeks. Though initially rejected by record labels, he eventually signed with Capitol Records; his first major success was "All My Friends Say".

== Music career ==
=== 2006–2010: I'll Stay Me and Doin' My Thing ===
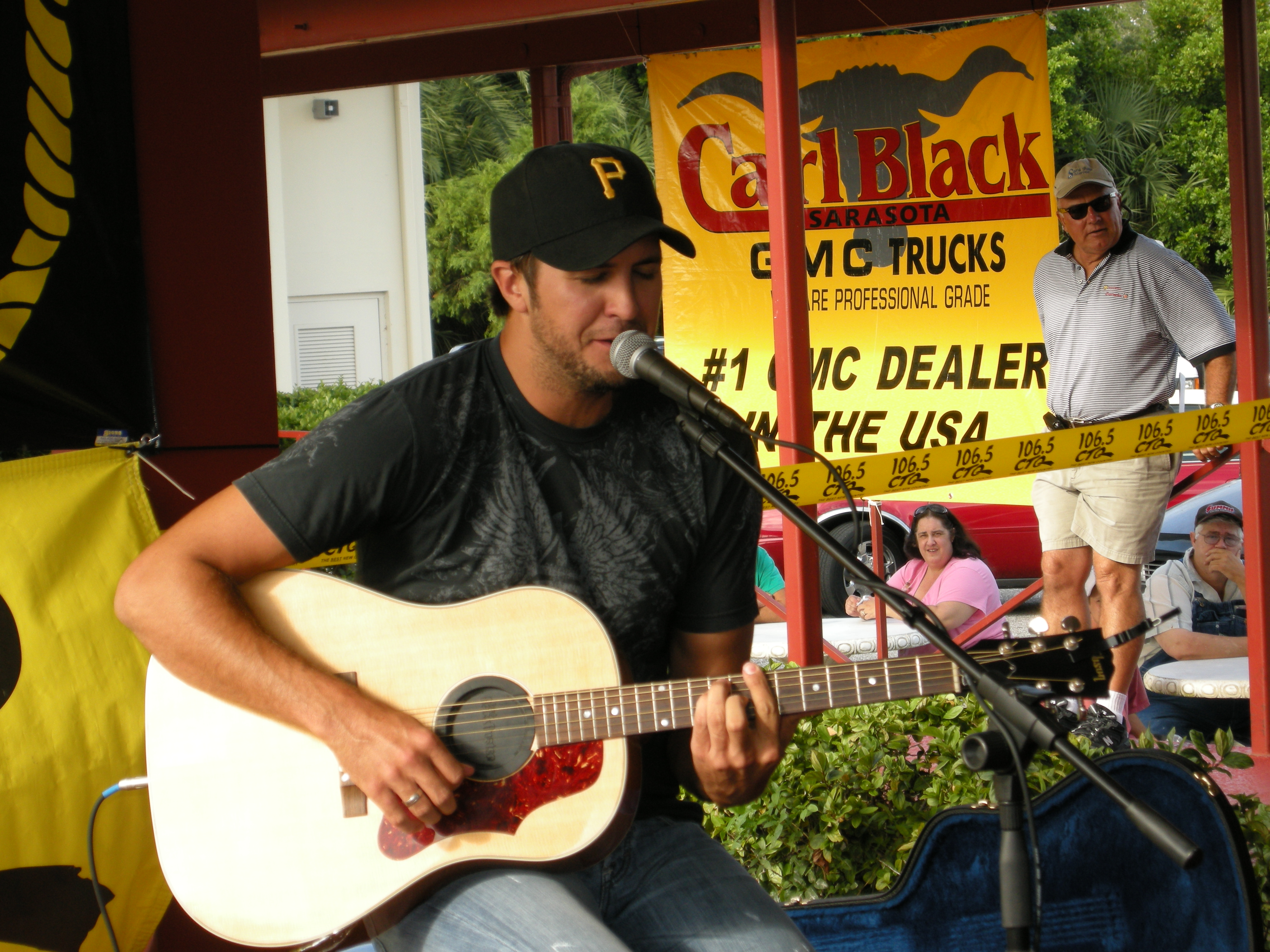
Bryan performing in 2008

Soon after his arrival in Nashville, Bryan joined a publishing house in the city. Among his first cuts was the title track of Travis Tritt's 2004 album My Honky Tonk History. He was later signed by Capitol Nashville to a recording contract. In the meantime, Bryan co-wrote Billy Currington's single "Good Directions", which went to number one on the Hot Country Songs chart in mid-2007. Bryan co-wrote his debut single, "All My Friends Say", with producer Jeff Stevens. This song reached a peak of number 5 on the Hot Country Songs chart. In August 2007, Capitol Nashville released Bryan's debut album, I'll Stay Me. Bryan wrote or co-wrote all but one of its 11 songs. The album's second single, "We Rode in Trucks", peaked at number 33 while "Country Man" reached number 10.

On March 10, 2009, he released an EP titled Spring Break with All My Friends that featured two new songs, "Sorority Girls" and "Take My Drunk Ass Home," plus an acoustic version of "All My Friends Say". After this EP, he released his fourth single, "Do I" in May 2009. Bryan wrote the song with Charles Kelley and Dave Haywood of Lady A, whose lead singer Hillary Scott also sings backing vocals on it. The song reached number 2 on the Hot Country Songs chart.

"Do I" was included on Bryan's second album, Doin' My Thing, which was released in October 2009. Also included on the album was a cover of OneRepublic's "Apologize". Bryan wrote the album's next two singles, "Rain Is a Good Thing" and "Someone Else Calling You Baby", with Dallas Davidson and Jeff Stevens, respectively. Both of these songs went to number one on the country music charts. AllMusic gave this album a positive review as well, with Stephen Thomas Erlewine considering Bryan more "relaxed" in comparison to his debut. On February 26, 2010, Bryan released a second EP, titled Spring Break 2...Hangover Edition, which featured three new songs: "Wild Weekend", "Cold Beer Drinker", and "I'm Hungover". While Bryan is mainly known as a country music singer, he has explored other genres like alternative rock with his cover of "Apologize".

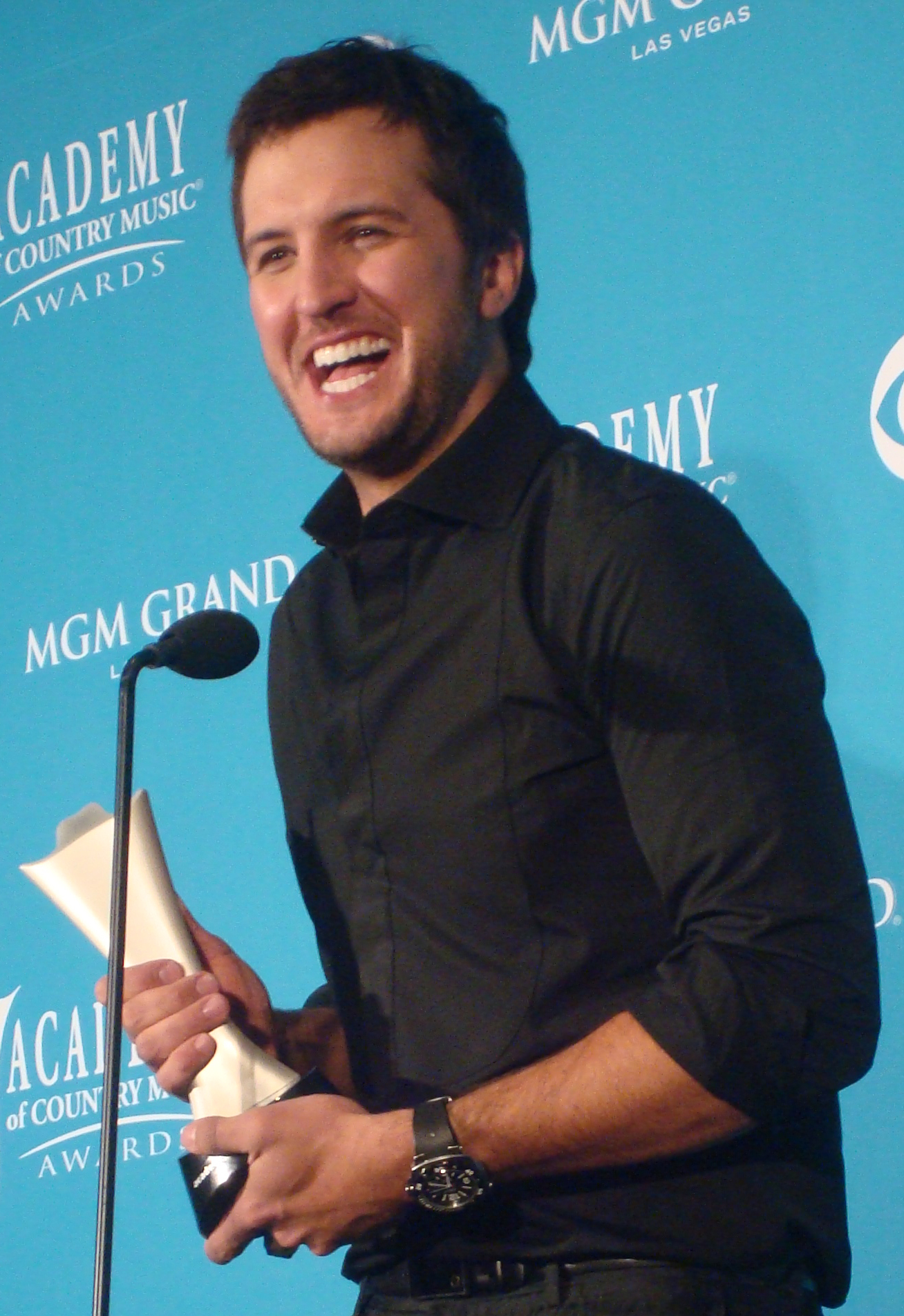
Bryan in 2010

Bryan appeared on the April 18, 2010, episode of Celebrity Apprentice alongside fellow country star Emily West. The task for each team was to make over an up-and-coming country star, with Bryan being selected by Team Rocksolid, led by Bill Goldberg, and West being selected by Team Tenacity, led by Cyndi Lauper. Bryan's makeover failed to impress the judges, leading to Rocksolid losing the task. Bryan's single "Rain Is a Good Thing" and West's single "Blue Sky" were both sold on iTunes, with a month's worth of sales being donated to Lauper's charity, the Stonewall Community Foundation, resulting in $25,000 being raised.

=== 2011–2015: Tailgates & Tanlines and Crash My Party ===
Bryan released his third EP, Spring Break 3...It's a Shore Thing, on February 25, 2011, featuring four new songs: "In Love With the Girl," "If You Ain't Here to Party," "Shore Thing," and "Love In a College Town". This release was followed by Bryan's seventh single, "Country Girl (Shake It for Me)", which was released on March 14, 2011. Also co-written by Bryan and Davidson, it served as the lead single to his third studio album, Tailgates & Tanlines, which was released August 9, 2011. The album peaked at number one on the Top Country Albums chart and number two on the Billboard 200 chart. "Country Girl" peaked at number 4 on the country music charts and number 22 on the Billboard Hot 100 chart. The album's next three singles – "I Don't Want This Night to End", "Drunk on You", and "Kiss Tomorrow Goodbye" – all reached number one on the country music charts. Bryan, along with Eric Church, sang guest vocals on Jason Aldean's "The Only Way I Know," the second single from his 2012 album, Night Train.

On March 6, 2012, Bryan released his fourth Spring Break EP, entitled Spring Break 4...Suntan City. Along with the title track, which Bryan co-wrote with Dallas Davidson, Rhett Akins and Ben Hayslip, the EP includes "Spring Break-Up," "Little Bit Later On," and "Shake the Sand". On January 30, 2013, Bryan announced his first compilation album, Spring Break...Here to Party, which includes fourteen songs: twelve from his previous Spring Break EPs and two new tracks. It was released on March 5. The album debuted at number one on both the Billboard Top Country Albums chart and the Billboard 200 chart, becoming the first album of his career to top the all-genre album chart. One of the new Spring Break songs, "Buzzkill", reached the top 20 on the Hot Country Songs chart.

Luke Bryan's fourth studio album, Crash My Party, was released on August 12, 2013. The album's first single, "Crash My Party", was premiered in a performance at the 2013 ACM Awards and released on April 7, 2013. It reached number one on the Country Airplay chart in July 2013. The album's second single, "That's My Kind of Night", was released to country radio on August 5, 2013. It reached number one on the Hot Country Songs chart in August 2013 and peaked at number 2 on the Country Airplay chart in October 2013. The album's third single, "Drink a Beer", was released to country radio on October 24, 2013. It reached number one on the Hot Country Songs chart in January 2014 and number one on the Country Airplay chart in February 2014. During the kickoff show for his 2014 That's My Kind of Night Tour in Columbus, Ohio, Bryan announced to the crowd that "Play It Again" would become the album's fourth single. This song reached number one on both the Hot Country Songs and Country Airplay charts in May 2014. At the same time, Bryan sang guest vocals on Florida Georgia Line's 2014 single "This Is How We Roll". On July 14, 2014, the song "Roller Coaster" was released as the album's fifth single. It reached number one on the Country Airplay chart in October 2014. The album's sixth single, "I See You", was released to country radio on November 3, 2014. It reached number one on the Hot Country Songs and Country Airplay charts in February 2015.

On March 11, 2014, Bryan began his sixth year of spring performances at Spinnaker Beach Club in Panama City Beach, Florida. On the same day, he also released his sixth Spring Break EP, Spring Break 6...Like We Ain't Ever. Bryan is the only country music artist to release an album of six number-one singles on both the Billboard's Hot Country Songs and Country Airplay charts.

=== 2015–2018: Kill the Lights and What Makes You Country ===
On November 11, 2014, it was confirmed that Bryan had begun writing and recording songs for his upcoming fifth studio album. His last Spring Break album, Spring Break...Checkin' Out, was released on March 10, 2015. It includes the six songs from the previous year's EP and five original new songs.

On May 19, 2015, Bryan released his first single from his fifth studio album, Kill the Lights, "Kick the Dust Up", which peaked at number one on the Country Airplay chart. He co-wrote over half of the songs on this album. This album provides not only his country flair, but also has tracks that include a disco-type beat along with the songs of romance. The album's second single, "Strip It Down", was released to country radio on August 4, 2015. The album was released on August 7. Kill the Lights sold 345,000 total copies its first week and beat out Dr. Dre's Compton to debut at number one on the Billboard 200 chart. "Strip It Down" went number one in October 2015, making fourteen cumulative number ones. The album's third single, "Home Alone Tonight", released to country radio on November 23, 2015. The song also became his fifteenth song to reach number one. The album's fourth single, "Huntin', Fishin' and Lovin' Every Day", was released to country radio on March 14, 2016. All six of the singles released from Bryan's Kill the Lights album reached number one on the Billboard Country Airplay chart, making Bryan the first artist in the 27-year history of the chart to achieve six number one singles from one album.

It was announced that Bryan would perform at halftime of the 2015 Thanksgiving match-up between the Dallas Cowboys and Carolina Panthers. In 2016, Bryan was selected as one of 30 artists to perform on "Forever Country", a mash-up track of "Take Me Home, Country Roads", "On the Road Again" and "I Will Always Love You" which celebrates 50 years of the CMA Awards. On February 5, 2017, Bryan performed the National Anthem at Super Bowl LI at NRG Stadium in Houston, TX. In September 2017, Bryan was announced as a judge for the revival of American Idol on ABC.

Bryan released "Light It Up" in mid-2017. It served as the lead single to his sixth album, What Makes You Country, which was released on December 8, 2017. "Most People Are Good" and "Sunrise, Sunburn, Sunset" were released as the album's second and third singles, respectively. The album's fourth single, the album's title track, was released to country radio on October 22, 2018.

=== 2019–present: Born Here Live Here Die Here and Mind of a Country Boy ===
"Knockin' Boots" was released to country radio in March 2019. In October 2019, "What She Wants Tonight" was released to country radio as the second single from his upcoming album. In January 2020, Bryan announced his next album would be titled Born Here Live Here Die Here and was scheduled to be released on April 24, 2020. The announcement of the album followed the announcement of his upcoming Proud to Be Right Here Tour. On March 13, 2020, "One Margarita" was released as the third single from the album.

Due to the COVID-19 pandemic, Bryan delayed the release of the album to August 7, 2020, and rescheduled the Proud to Be Right Here Tour to 2021. On June 12, 2020, Bryan released the track "Build Me A Daddy" along with a music video for the song. On October 19, 2020, the song "Down to One" was made the fourth single from the album. A deluxe edition of Born Here Live Here Die Here, released on April 9, 2021, produced the album's fifth single, "Waves", as well as its sixth single, "Up," which was released on October 11, 2021. In October, it was announced that Bryan would host the 55th Annual Country Music Association Awards for the first time, making him the first solo host in 18 years.

Bryan's eighth studio album, Mind of a Country Boy, was released on September 27, 2024.

== Hosting ==
Bryan hosted the 50th annual ACM awards in 2015 with fellow country singer Blake Shelton. He sang "I See You" and won entertainer of the year.

His first time hosting the CMA Awards was in 2021. The awards show was held in Nashville, Tennessee, and Bryan also won entertainer of the year.

He hosted the CMA awards again the next year with retired NFL quarterback Peyton Manning.

== Personal life ==
Bryan is married to Caroline Boyer. They married on December 8, 2006, and have two sons together. They live in Williamson County, near Nashville. They named their house "Red Bird Farm" after Luke's older sister, Kelly, who died. The design was inspired by the barn at Blackberry Farms in Walland, Tennessee.

In 2007, Bryan's older sister Kelly died unexpectedly at home of unknown causes.

My only older siblings...gone from the world, in a flash, in two...two different, crazy, tragic manners, that...we'll never know, and never understand.

— Luke Bryan

After Kelly's husband Ben Lee Cheshire died in 2014, Bryan and his wife began raising their nephew and taking care of their nieces.

The combined losses of his brother and sister inspired the performance of Bryan's single "Drink a Beer" (written by Chris Stapleton).

In 2015, Forbes estimated Bryan's annual income at $42.5 million.

=== Philanthropy ===
Bryan has supported numerous charities and causes, including the City of Hope and Red Cross. Past causes Bryan supported were AIDS and HIV, cancer, children's disaster relief, health, and human rights.

Following the death of her niece, Bryan's wife, Caroline, established Brett's Barn in her honor. Brett's Barn, located on their family farm, is a sanctuary for rescue animals that invites sick children to spend time with the over 20 animals they host on the farm. She and Bryan are also on the board of directors of the Brett Boyer Foundation, which raises awareness for Down Syndrome and congenital heart disease. The organization also hosts a number of fundraisers to raise money for research, including "Bike for Brett" which occurs annually on World Down Syndrome Day.

== Other ventures ==
=== Crash My Playa ===
Crash My Playa is a 4-night all-inclusive concert vacation hosted by Luke Bryan in Cancun, Mexico. Past performers include Blake Shelton, Jason Aldean, Florida Georgia Line, Dierks Bentley, Chris Stapleton, Little Big Town, Sam Hunt, Dustin Lynch, Luke Combs, and Thomas Rhett.

=== Luke's 32 Bridge Food + Drink ===
Luke's 32 Bridge Food + Drink is located in the heart of Broadway Street in Nashville, Tennessee. The 30,000 square feet multi-level entertainment facility features 6 levels, 8 bars, 3 stages with live music, and two restaurants. The bar has achieved notable popularity, with multiple references in popular culture, including being mentioned in the song "32 Bridge" by Country music singer Ian Humphreys-Graham, which was reportedly written on the back of a napkin at the establishment.

=== 32 Bridge Entertainment ===
Luke Bryan started his own record label, 32 Bridge Entertainment, under the Universal Music Group Nashville umbrella. In 2018, Jon Langston became the first artist signed to the new label.

== Artistry ==
=== Vocals ===
Bryan possesses a high baritone vocal range of two octaves from A2 to A4. Commenting on his vocal performance in "Tailgates and Tanlines," Slant magazine's Jonathan Keefer described Bryan's voice as "a pleasant, if slightly nasal, baritone".

=== Influences ===
Bryan has cited country artists George Strait, Alan Jackson, Alabama, and Merle Haggard as influences on his career. He also cited hip hop bands Beastie Boys and Run-D.M.C. as a source of inspiration in an interview with The Huffington Post, noting, "I think there's been somewhat of a change with our generation. You know, nobody grew up more country than me, but I mean, I had Beastie Boys playing on little boom boxes and Run D.M.C. and all forms of music, so through the years, I just think it's all constantly blending together."

== Discography ==
Studio albums

- I'll Stay Me (2007)
- Doin' My Thing (2009)
- Tailgates & Tanlines (2011)
- Crash My Party (2013)
- Kill the Lights (2015)
- What Makes You Country (2017)
- Born Here Live Here Die Here (2020)
- Mind of a Country Boy (2024)
- Signs (2026)

== Tours ==
Headlining

- Dirt Road Diaries Tour (2013)
- That's My Kind of Night Tour (2014–2015)
- Kick the Dust Up Tour (2015)
- Kill The Lights Tour (2016–2017)
- Huntin', Fishin' and Lovin' Every Day Tour (2017)
- What Makes You Country Tour (2018)
- Sunset Repeat Tour (2019)
- Proud to Be Right Here Tour (2021)
- Raised Up Right Tour (2022)
- Country On Tour (2023)
- Mind of a Country Boy Tour (2024)

Supporting

- Emotional Traffic Tour with Tim McGraw (2011)
- My Kind of Party Tour with Jason Aldean (2012)
- Own the Night Tour with Lady Antebellum (2012)
- Night Train Tour with Jason Aldean (2013) – One Show

Minor tours

- Farm Tour (2010–present)

Festivals

- Crash My Playa (2015–2020; 2022-present)

Residencies

- Las Vegas (2022-2024)

== Awards and nominations ==
Year	Association	Category	Nominated work	Result	Ref
2010	Academy of Country Music Awards	Top New Solo Vocalist	Himself	Won	
2010	Academy of Country Music Awards	Top New Artist	Himself	Won	
2010	CMT Music Awards	USA Weekend Breakthrough Video of the Year	"Do I"	Won	
2010	Country Music Association Awards	New Artist of the Year	Himself	Nominated	
2011	CMT Music Awards	Best Web Video of the Year	"It's a Shore Thing"	Nominated	
2011	CMT Music Awards	Nationwide Insurance On Your Side Award	Himself	Nominated	
2011	Country Music Association Awards	New Artist of the Year	Himself	Nominated	
2011	Teen Choice Awards	Choice Music: Country Song	"Country Girl (Shake It for Me)"	Nominated	
2011	Teen Choice Awards	Choice Music: Country Artist Male	Himself	Nominated	
2011	American Country Awards	Male Artist of the Year	Himself	Nominated	
2011	American Country Awards	Single by a Male Artist	"Someone Else Calling You Baby"	Nominated	
2012	CMT Music Awards	Video of the Year: Male	"I Don't Want This Night To End"	Won	
2012	Teen Choice Awards	Teen Choice Award for Music – Male Country Artist	Himself	Nominated	
2012	Country Music Association Awards	Male Vocalist of the Year	Himself	Nominated	
2012	Country Music Association Awards	Album of the Year	Tailgates & Tanlines	Nominated	
2012	American Music Awards	Favorite Male Country Artist	Himself	Won	
2012	American Music Awards	Favorite Country Album	Tailgates & Tanlines	Nominated	
2012	American Country Awards	Artist of the Year	Himself	Won	
2012	American Country Awards	Male Artist of the Year	Himself	Won	
2012	American Country Awards	Single of the Year	"I Don't Want This Night to End"	Won	
2012	American Country Awards	Single by a Male Artist	"I Don't Want This Night to End"	Won	
2012	American Country Awards	Music Video of the Year	"I Don't Want This Night to End"	Won	
2012	American Country Awards	Music Video by a Male Artist	"I Don't Want This Night to End"	Won	
2012	American Country Awards	Album of the Year	Tailgates & Tanlines	Won	
2012	American Country Awards	Most Played Radio Track	"I Don't Want This Night to End"	Won	
2012	American Country Awards	Most Played Radio Track by a Male Artist	"I Don't Want This Night to End"	Won	
2013	Academy of Country Music Awards	Entertainer of the Year	Himself	Won	
2013	Academy of Country Music Awards	Male Vocalist of the Year	Himself	Nominated	
2013	Academy of Country Music Awards	Album of the Year	Tailgates & Tanlines	Nominated	
2013	Academy of Country Music Awards	Vocal Event of the Year	"The Only Way I Know" (with Jason Aldean and Eric Church)	Won	
2013	Billboard Music Awards	Top Country Artist	Himself	Nominated	
2013	Billboard Music Awards	Top Country Album	Tailgates & Tanlines	Nominated	
2013	Billboard Music Awards	Top Country Song	"Drunk on You"	Nominated	
2013	CMT Music Awards	Video of the Year	"Kiss Tomorrow Goodbye"	Nominated	
2013	CMT Music Awards	Male Video of the Year	"Kiss Tomorrow Goodbye"	Nominated	
2013	CMT Music Awards	Collaboration Video of the Year	"The Only Way I Know" (with Jason Aldean and Eric Church)	Won	
2013	CMT Music Awards	CMT Performance of the Year	"Drunk on You"/"Feel Again" (with Ryan Tedder)	Nominated	
2013	American Music Awards	Favorite Country Male Artist	Himself	Won	
2013	American Music Awards	Favorite Country Album	Crash My Party	Nominated	
2014	Billboard Music Awards	Top Billboard 200 Album	Crash My Party	Nominated	
2014	Billboard Music Awards	Top Country Album	Crash My Party	Won	
2014	Billboard Music Awards	Top Male Artist	Himself	Nominated	
2014	Billboard Music Awards	Top Billboard 200 Artist	Himself	Nominated	
2014	Billboard Music Awards	Top Country Artist	Himself	Won	
2014	Billboard Music Awards	Top Country Song	"Crash My Party"	Won	
2014	Billboard Music Awards	Top Country Song	"That's My Kind of Night"	Nominated	
2014	Academy of Country Music Awards	Entertainer of the Year	Himself	Nominated	
2014	Academy of Country Music Awards	Male Vocalist of the Year	Himself	Nominated	
2014	Academy of Country Music Awards	Album of the Year	Crash My Party	Nominated	
2014	American Music Awards	Artist of the Year	Himself	Nominated	
2014	American Music Awards	Favorite Country Male Artist	Himself	Won	
2014	American Country Countdown Awards	Artist of the Year	Himself	Nominated	
2014	American Country Countdown Awards	Male Vocalist of the Year	Himself	Won	
2014	American Country Countdown Awards	Collaboration	"This Is How We Roll" (with Florida Georgia Line)	Won	
2014	American Country Countdown Awards	Album	Crash My Party	Nominated	
2014	American Country Countdown Awards	Digital Song of the Year	"Drink a Beer"	Nominated	
2014	American Country Countdown Awards	Digital Song of the Year	"This Is How We Roll" (with Florida Georgia Line)	Won	
2014	Country Music Association Awards	Entertainer of the Year	Himself	Won	
2014	Country Music Association Awards	Male Vocalist of the Year	Himself	Nominated	
2014	Country Music Association Awards	Album of the Year	Crash My Party	Nominated	
2015	People's Choice Awards	Favorite Male Country Artist	Himself	Nominated	
2015	Academy of Country Music Awards	Entertainer of the Year	Himself	Won	
2015	Academy of Country Music Awards	Male Vocalist of the Year	Himself	Nominated	
2015	Academy of Country Music Awards	Vocal Event of the Year	"This Is How We Roll" (with Florida Georgia Line)	Won	
2015	Academy of Country Music Awards	Song of the Year	"Drink a Beer" (as the Artist)	Nominated	
2015	Billboard Music Awards	Top Country Artist	Himself	Nominated	
2015	Billboard Music Awards	Top Country Song	"Play It Again"	Nominated	
2015	Billboard Music Awards	Top Country Song	"This Is How We Roll" (with Florida Georgia Line)	Nominated	
2015	Billboard Music Awards	Top Country Album	Crash My Party	Nominated	
2015	CMT Music Awards	Male Video of the Year	"Play It Again"	Won	
2015	CMT Music Awards	Video of the Year	"Play It Again"	Nominated	
2015	Teen Choice Awards	Choice Country Artist	Himself	Nominated	
2015	Teen Choice Awards	Choice Country Song	"Kick the Dust Up"	Nominated	
2015	Canadian Country Music Association	Top Selling Album	Crash My Party	Won	
2015	Country Music Association Awards	Male Vocalist of the Year	Himself	Nominated	
2015	Country Music Association Awards	Entertainer of the Year	Himself	Won	
2015	American Music Awards	Artist of the Year	Himself	Nominated	
2015	American Music Awards	Favorite Country Male Artist	Himself	Won	
2016	People's Choice Awards	Favorite Male Artist	Himself	Nominated	
2016	People's Choice Awards	Favorite Male Country Artist	Himself	Nominated	
2016	iHeartRadio Music Awards	Male Artist of the Year	Himself	Nominated	
2016	iHeartRadio Music Awards	Best Tour	Himself	Nominated	
2016	iHeartRadio Music Awards	Country Artist of the Year	Himself	Won	
2016	iHeartRadio Music Awards	Country Song of the Year	"I See You"	Nominated	
2016	Academy of Country Music Awards	Entertainer of the Year	Himself	Nominated	
2016	Academy of Country Music Awards	Vocal Event of the Year	"Home Alone Tonight" (feat. Karen Fairchild)	Nominated	
2016	American Country Countdown Awards	Artist of the Year	Himself	Won	
2016	American Country Countdown Awards	Male Vocalist of the Year	Himself	Won	
2016	American Country Countdown Awards	Song of the Year	"Strip It Down"	Nominated	
2016	American Country Countdown Awards	Album of the Year	"Kill the Lights"	Nominated	
2016	American Country Countdown Awards	Digital Song of the Year	"Kick the Dust Up"	Nominated	
2016	American Country Countdown Awards	Touring Artist of the Year	Himself	Nominated	
2016	Billboard Music Awards	Top Country Artist	Himself	Won	
2016	Billboard Music Awards	Top Country Album	Kill the Lights	Nominated	
2016	Country Music Association Awards	Entertainer of the Year	Himself	Nominated	
2016	Country Music Association Awards	Musical Event of the Year	"Home Alone Tonight" (feat. Karen Fairchild)	Nominated	
2016	American Music Awards	Favorite Country Album	Kill the Lights	Nominated	
2016	American Music Awards	Favorite Male Country Artist	Himself	Nominated	
2017	Academy of Country Music Awards	Entertainer of the Year	Himself	Nominated	
2017	People's Choice Awards	Favorite Male Country Artist	Himself	Nominated	
2017	iHeartRadio Music Awards	Male Artist of the Year	Himself	Nominated	
2017	iHeartRadio Music Awards	Country Artist of the Year	Himself	Nominated	
2017	Billboard Music Awards	Top Country Tour	Kill the Lights Tour	Nominated	
2017	Billboard Music Awards	Billboard Chart Achievement Award	Himself	Nominated	
2017	CMT Music Awards	Video of the Year	"Huntin', Fishin,' and Lovin' Every Day"	Nominated	
2017	CMT Music Awards	Male Video of the Year	"Huntin', Fishin,' and Lovin' Every Day"	Nominated	
2017	CMT Music Awards	CMT Performance of the Year	"Want to Want Me" (with Jason Derulo)	Won	
2017	Teen Choice Awards	Choice Country Artist	Himself	Nominated	
2017	Country Music Association Awards	Entertainer of the Year	Himself	Nominated	
2018	Academy of Country Music Awards	Entertainer of the Year	Himself	Nominated	
2018	Country Music Association Awards	Entertainer of the Year	Himself	Nominated	
2018	American Music Awards	Favorite Male Artist - Country	Himself	Nominated	
2019	Academy of Country Music Awards	Album of the Decade	Crash My Party	Won	
2019	Academy of Country Music Awards	Entertainer of the Year	Luke Bryan	Nominated	
2019	Academy of Country Music Awards	Single of the Year	"Most People Are Good"	Nominated	
2019	iHeartRadio Music Awards	Country Artist of the Year	Himself	Nominated	
2019	iHeartRadio Music Awards	Country Song of the Year	"Most People Are Good"	Nominated	
2019	CMT Music Awards	Male Video of the Year	"Sunrise, Sunburn, Sunset"	Nominated	
2019	CMT Music Awards	Collaborative Video of the Year	"Straight To Hell" (with Darius Rucker, Jason Aldean, Charles Kelley)	Nominated	
2020	iHeartRadio Music Awards	Country Artist of the Year	Himself	Nominated	
2020	Academy of Country Music Awards	Entertainer of the Year	Himself	Nominated	
2020	CMT Music Awards	Male Video of the Year	One Margarita	Won	
2021	Country Radio Broadcasters	Artist Humanitarian Award	Himself	Won	
2021	Academy of Country Music Awards	Entertainer of the Year	Himself	Won	
2021	Academy of Country Music Awards	Album of the Year	Born Here Live Here Die Here	Nominated	
2021	American Music Awards	Favorite Male Country Artist	Himself	Won	
2023	CMT Music Awards	Video of the Year	Country On	Nominated	

== Filmography ==
Year	Title	Role	Notes
2011–present	CMT Crossroads	Himself	with The Doobie Brothers and Jason Derulo
2013–2017	Academy of Country Music Awards	Co-host	With Blake Shelton and Dierks Bentley
2014	Nashville	Himself	Episode: How Far Down Can I Go?
2014–present	Buck Commander	Himself	With Willie Robertson and Adam LaRoche
2015	The Voice	Judge	Season 8 finale result
2017	The Voice	Advisor	Season 12: Blake Shelton's team
2018–present	American Idol	Judge	With Katy Perry (2018-2024), Lionel Richie and Carrie Underwood (2025-present).
2019–present	The Rookie	Himself	Episode: The Overnight
2020	Jeopardy! The Greatest of All Time	Video Clue Presenter	1 episode
2021	Surrender on the USS Missouri	Narrator	American Public Television documentary
2021-2024	CMA Awards	Host	Peyton Manning co-hosted between 2022 and 2024.
