= Jon Pardi discography =

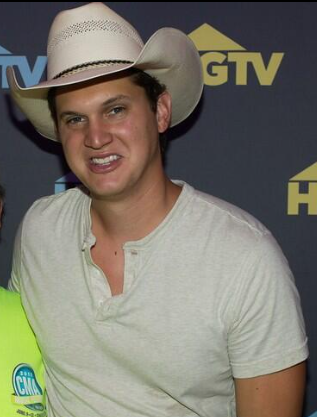
- Pardi in 2014
- Studio albums: 5
- EPs: 2
- Singles: 17
- Music videos: 22
- Promotional singles: 6
- No. 1 singles: 7

American country music singer Jon Pardi has released five studio albums, two extended plays, and seventeen singles, including two as a featured artist. He debuted in 2012 with "Missin' You Crazy", a song which charted within the top 30 of Billboard Hot Country Songs and Country Airplay. He would go on to release three more singles from what would become his debut album Write You a Song.

Pardi's second album, California Sunrise (2016), accounted for his first number-one hit on Country Airplay with 2015's "Head Over Boots"; followup "Dirt on My Boots" would also reach the top of that chart one year later. His third studio album, Heartache Medication, would go on to account for his third solo number-one hit in its title track in 2020. That same year, he also topped the charts as a featured vocalist on Thomas Rhett's "Beer Can't Fix".

== Studio albums ==
Title	Details	Peak chart positions				Sales	Certification
Title	Details	US	US Country	US Holiday	CAN	Sales	Certification
Write You a Song	Release date: January 14, 2014; Label: Capitol Nashville	14	3	—	—	US: 85,000	RIAA: Platinum
California Sunrise	Release date: June 17, 2016; Label: Capitol Nashville	11	1	—	51	US: 279,100	RIAA: 3× Platinum; MC: 2× Platinum; RMNZ: Gold
Heartache Medication	Release date: September 27, 2019; Label: Capitol Nashville	11	2	—	18	US: 56,400	RIAA: Platinum; MC: Gold
Mr. Saturday Night	Release date: September 2, 2022; Label: Capitol Nashville	33	5	—	58		RIAA: Platinum
Merry Christmas from Jon Pardi	Release date: October 27, 2023; Label: Capitol Nashville	—	—	30	—		
Honkytonk Hollywood	Release date: April 11, 2025; Label: Capitol Nashville	145	27	—	—		
"—" denotes releases that did not chart

== Extended plays ==
Title	Details	Peak positions	Sales
Title	Details	US Country	Sales
The B-Sides, 2011–2014	Release date: May 18, 2015; Label: Capitol Nashville	26	US: 2,400
Rancho Fiesta Sessions	Release date: August 14, 2020; Label: Capitol Nashville	—	

== Singles ==
=== As lead artist ===
Year	Title	Peak chart positions					Sales	Certifications	Album
Year	Title	US	US Country	US Country Airplay	CAN	CAN Country	Sales	Certifications	Album
2012	"Missin' You Crazy"	—	29	25	—	—			Write You a Song
2013	"Up All Night"	56	10	11	—	46	US: 539,000	RIAA: 2× Platinum; MC: Platinum	Write You a Song
2014	"What I Can't Put Down"	—	33	31	—	—		RIAA: Gold	Write You a Song
2014	"When I've Been Drinkin'"	—	36	38	—	—		RIAA: Platinum	Write You a Song
2015	"Head Over Boots"	51	4	1	64	2	US: 701,000	RIAA: 7× Platinum; MC: 6× Platinum; RMNZ: Platinum	California Sunrise
2016	"Dirt on My Boots"	37	2	1	58	1	US: 742,000	RIAA: 7× Platinum; MC: 6× Platinum; RMNZ: Platinum	California Sunrise
2017	"Heartache on the Dance Floor"	47	5	3	86	1	US: 240,000	RIAA: 4× Platinum; MC: 4× Platinum; RMNZ: Gold	California Sunrise
2017	"She Ain't in It"	— (Note: "She Ain't in It" did not enter the Billboard Hot 100, but peaked at number 25 on the Bubbling Under Hot 100 chart.)	23	21	—	31		RIAA: Platinum; MC: Gold	California Sunrise
2018	"Night Shift"	56	8	5	88	14	US: 95,000	RIAA: 3× Platinum; MC: 4× Platinum; RMNZ: Platinum	California Sunrise
2019	"Heartache Medication"	42	5	1	72	1	US: 82,000	RIAA: 4× Platinum; MC: 2× Platinum	Heartache Medication
2020	"Ain't Always the Cowboy"	55	6	3	52	1		RIAA: 2× Platinum; MC: Platinum	Heartache Medication
2021	"Tequila Little Time"	60	14	5	62	3		RIAA: Platinum; MC: Platinum	Heartache Medication
2022	"Last Night Lonely"	27	5	1	42	1		RIAA: Platinum; MC: 2× Platinum	Mr. Saturday Night
2022	"Your Heart or Mine"	47	11	4	53	3		RIAA: 2× Platinum; MC: Platinum	Mr. Saturday Night
2023	"Cowboys and Plowboys" (with Luke Bryan)	—	—	26	—	48			Non-album single
2024	"Friday Night Heartbreaker"	— (Note: "Friday Night Heartbreaker" did not enter the Billboard Hot 100, but peaked at number 3 on the Bubbling Under Hot 100 chart.)	30	9	—	19			Honkytonk Hollywood
2026	"Boots Off"	—	42	18	—	29			Honkytonk Hollywood
"—" denotes releases that did not chart

=== As featured artist ===
Year	Title	Peak chart positions					Sales	Certifications	Album
Year	Title	US	US Country Songs	US Country Airplay	CAN	CAN Country	Sales	Certifications	Album
2020	"Beer Can't Fix" (Thomas Rhett featuring Jon Pardi)	36	6	1	45	1	US: 28,000	RIAA: Platinum; MC: Platinum	Center Point Road
2021	"Getting Over Him" (with Lauren Alaina)	—	35	29	—	28			Sitting Pretty on Top of the World
2022	"Longneck Way to Go" (with Midland)	—	—	52	—	—			The Last Resort: Greetings From and Mr. Saturday Night
"—" denotes releases that did not chart

=== Promotional singles ===
Year	Title	Certifications	Album
2015	"Back on the Backroads"		EP: The B-Sides, 2011–2014
2016	"California Sunrise"		California Sunrise
2019	"Me and Jack"		Heartache Medication
2019	"Old Hat"		Heartache Medication
2022	"Fill 'Er Up"		Mr. Saturday Night
2022	"Mr. Saturday Night"	RIAA: Gold	Mr. Saturday Night

== Other charted songs ==
Year	Title	Peak chart positions		Certifications	Album
Year	Title	US Country Airplay	CAN Country	Certifications	Album
2016	"Cowboy Hat"	—	—	RIAA: Gold	California Sunrise
2016	"Can't Turn You Down"	—	—	RIAA: Platinum	California Sunrise
2019	"Starlight"	—	—	RIAA: Gold	Heartache Medication
2023	"Beer for Santa" (with the All-Nighters)	58	48		Merry Christmas from Jon Pardi
2023	"All I Want for Christmas Is You" (with the All-Nighters)	49	—		Merry Christmas from Jon Pardi

== Other album appearances ==
List of other album appearances, showing year released, song title, other artists, and album name
Year	Title	Other artist(s)	Album	Ref.
2019	"My Next Broken Heart"	Brooks & Dunn	Reboot	
2021	"In Love With My Problems"	Larry Fleet	Stack of Records	
2021	"Can't Say That (In a Country Song)"	Bobby Bones and the Raging Idiots	Award Winning EP	
2021	"Wherever I May Roam"	Metallica	The Metallica Blacklist	

== Music videos ==
Year	Video	Director
2012	"Missin' You Crazy"	The Edde Brothers
2013	"Up All Night"	The Edde Brothers
2014	"What I Can't Put Down"	The Edde Brothers
2015	"Back on the Backroads"	The Edde Brothers
2016	"Head Over Boots"	Jim Wright
2016	"Dirt on My Boots" (Live)	Marc Klasfeld
2017	"Dirt on My Boots"	
2017	"Heartache on the Dance Floor"	Carlos Ruiz
2018	"She Ain't in It"	Jim Wright
2018	"Night Shift"	Jim Wright
2019	"Heartache Medication"	Carlos Ruiz
2020	"Beer Can't Fix" (with Thomas Rhett)	Shaun Silva
2020	"Ain't Always the Cowboy"	Carlos Ruiz
2021	"Tequila Little Time"	Carlos Ruiz
2022	"Last Night Lonely"	Harper Smith
2022	"Fill 'Er Up"	
2022	"Longneck Way to Go" (with Midland)	Harper Smith
2022	"Mr. Saturday Night"	
2023	"Your Heart or Mine"	Carlos Ruiz
2023	"Cowboys and Plowboys" (with Luke Bryan)	Shaun Silva
2025	"Friday Night Heartbreaker"	Jim Wright
2026	"Boots Off"	Jim Wright
