= California Sunrise (disambiguation) =

California Sunrise is a 2016 album by Jon Pardi.

California Sunrise may also refer to:

- "California Sunrise", 2016 song by Jon Pardi from album California Sunrise
- "California Sunrise", 2007 song by Trance duo Blank & Jones from the eighth studio album Relax Edition 3
- "California Sunrise", 2005 song by Bassnectar
