= Last Night Lonely =

Single by Jon Pardi

from the album Mr. Saturday Night
- Released: February 22, 2022
- Genre: Country
- Length: 3:02
- Label: Capitol Nashville
- Songwriters: Dylan Marlowe; Joe Fox; Jimi Bell
- Producers: Jon Pardi; Bart Butler; Ryan Gore

Jon Pardi singles chronology
"Getting Over Him" (2021)	"Last Night Lonely" (2022)	"Longneck Way to Go" (2022)

Music video
- "Last Night Lonely" on YouTube

"Last Night Lonely" is a song recorded by American country music singer Jon Pardi. It is his thirteenth single release overall, and the first from his fourth studio album Mr. Saturday Night.

== Content ==
The song was written by Dylan Marlowe, Joe Fox, and Jimi Bell. The three of them wrote the song in 2020. Marlowe provided the song's riff, at which point they came up with the title. From this they developed a "grocery list" of events in the lives of a couple who are drinking alcohol together and describe their impending romance as their "last night lonely". Fox thought the final product had a similar sound to a Tom Petty or Bruce Springsteen song. The final recording, co-produced by Bart Butler and Ryan Gore, features a fiddle solo from Jenee Fleenor. Also present are guitarist Rob McNelley, drummer Miles McPherson, and bass guitarist Lee Francis.

Billy Dukes of Taste of Country described the song as an "uptempo" song with "raw guitar chords", comparing it favorably to Pardi's "What I Can't Put Down".

== Music video ==
A music video directed by Carlos Ruiz was released on May 6, 2022. Pardi checks into a roadside motel just outside Las Vegas, where he changes into a black suit and is escorted into downtown via limousine.

== Charts ==
=== Weekly charts ===
Weekly chart performance for "Last Night Lonely"
Chart (2022)	Peak position
Canada Hot 100 (Billboard)	42
Canada Country (Billboard)	1
US Billboard Hot 100	27
US Country Airplay (Billboard)	1
US Hot Country Songs (Billboard)	5

=== Year-end charts ===
2022 year-end chart performance for "Last Night Lonely"
Chart (2022)	Position
Canada (Canadian Hot 100)	95
US Billboard Hot 100	95
US Country Airplay (Billboard)	25
US Hot Country Songs (Billboard)	28

== Certifications ==
Certifications for "Last Night Lonely"
Region	Certification	Certified units/sales
Canada (Music Canada)	2× Platinum	160,000^{‡}
United States (RIAA)	Platinum	1,000,000^{‡}
^{‡} Sales+streaming figures based on certification alone.
