= Getting Over Him =

Single by Lauren Alaina and Jon Pardi

from the EP Getting Good and the album Sitting Pretty on Top of the World
- Released: February 22, 2021
- Genre: Country
- Length: 2:47
- Label: Mercury Nashville; 19
- Songwriters: Lauren Alaina; Emily Weisband; Paul DiGiovanni
- Producer: Paul DiGiovanni

Lauren Alaina singles chronology
"One Beer" (2020)	"Getting Over Him" (2021)

Jon Pardi singles chronology
"Tequila Little Time" (2020)	"Getting Over Him" (2021)	"Last Night Lonely" (2022)

Music video
- "Getting Over Him" on YouTube

"Getting Over Him" is a song by American country music singers Lauren Alaina and Jon Pardi. Alaina co-wrote the song with Emily Weisband and the record's producer, Paul DiGiovanni. It was released to country radio February 22, 2021 as the lead single from her 2020 EP of the same name, and was included on her third studio album Sitting Pretty on Top of the World, which was released on September 3, 2021.

== Background ==
Inspiration for the song came after Alaina experienced two public breakups over the course of a year and the singer was rediscovering the freedom of being single. When Alaina decided to adapt the song as a duet, Pardi was her first choice for a vocal partner. Alaina and Pardi had previously co-hosted the Academy of Country Music ACM Honors ceremony in 2018 and worked together on the track "Don't Blame It on Whiskey" from Pardi's 2019 album, Heartache Medication.

== Content ==
"Getting Over Him" is a "blues-tinged" country song about using "casual, no-strings-attached fun" to get over a failed romance. One of song's key lines—"My last call, first call, no falling/Just my getting over him guy"—was originally intended for another song, but was incorporated into the lyrics of "Getting Over Him" during the song's development due to their thematic fit. Alaina decided to compose the song as a duet to "soften" the message, telling American Songwriter that she is "really not a one-night stand girl."

== Critical reception ==
Jessica Nicholson of American Songwriter wrote that "Getting Over Him" is a "sizzling slice of defiant fun." Billboard staff described the song as "a pitch perfect duet" in one review and the magazine's Melinda Newman wrote that "Alaina and Pardi make a no-strings-attached tryst sound deliciously good" in another.

== Charts ==
Chart performance for "Getting Over Him"
Chart (2021–2022)	Peak position
Canada Country (Billboard)	28
US Country Airplay (Billboard)	29
US Hot Country Songs (Billboard)	35
