= Heartache Medication (song) =

Single by Jon Pardi

from the album Heartache Medication
- Released: May 20, 2019
- Genre: Country
- Length: 3:29
- Label: Capitol Nashville
- Songwriters: Jon Pardi; Barry Dean; Natalie Hemby
- Producers: Jon Pardi; Bart Butler; Ryan Gore

Jon Pardi singles chronology
"Night Shift" (2018)	"Heartache Medication" (2019)	"Beer Can't Fix" (2020)

Music video
- "Heartache Medication" on YouTube

"Heartache Medication" is a song co-written and recorded by American country music singer Jon Pardi. It was released on May 20, 2019, as the lead single and title track from his third studio album Heartache Medication. Pardi wrote the song with Natalie Hemby and Barry Dean. Heartache Medication gave Pardi his third number-one hit on the Billboard Country Airplay chart. It also peaked at numbers five and 42 on both the Hot Country Songs and Hot 100 charts respectively. The song was certified four-times Platinum by the Recording Industry Association of America (RIAA), and has sold 82,000 copies in the United States as of March 2020. It achieved similar success in Canada, reaching number one on the Country chart and number 72 on the Canadian Hot 100 chart. It was certified Platinum by Music Canada, denoting sales of over 80,000 units in that country. The music video for the single features Pardi performing the song while dancing with his girlfriend.

== Content and history ==
Cillea Houghton of Sounds Like Nashville describes the song as "centered around a heartbroken man curing his misery not with anger or spite, but a glass of something strong". Pardi said that the song carries "an '80s George Strait 'Fool Hearted Memory' feel to it, and is something people can dance to."

== Commercial performance ==
"Heartache Medication" reached number one on Billboard's Country Airplay on chart dated February 8, 2020, becoming Pardi's third number one on that chart, and his first since "Dirt on My Boots" in March–April 2017. The song was certified four-times platinum by the Recording Industry Association of America (RIAA) on May 29, 2026, for four million units in sales and streams. It has sold 82,000 copies in the United States as of March 2020.

The song reached No. 1 on the Billboard Canada Country chart dated December 28, 2019.

== Music video ==
The music video features Pardi and his girlfriend, Summer Duncan, performing the song while dancing.

== Charts ==
=== Weekly charts ===
Chart (2019–2020)	Peak position
Canada Hot 100 (Billboard)	72
Canada Country (Billboard)	1
US Billboard Hot 100	42
US Country Airplay (Billboard)	1
US Hot Country Songs (Billboard)	5
US Rolling Stone Top 100	95

=== Year-end charts ===
Chart (2019)	Position
US Hot Country Songs (Billboard)	64

Chart (2020)	Position
US Country Airplay (Billboard)	30
US Hot Country Songs (Billboard)	32

== Certifications ==
Region	Certification	Certified units/sales
Canada (Music Canada)	Platinum	80,000^{‡}
United States (RIAA)	4× Platinum	4,000,000^{‡} / 82,000
^{‡} Sales+streaming figures based on certification alone.
