= Your Heart or Mine =

Single by Jon Pardi

from the album Mr. Saturday Night
- Released: October 3, 2022
- Genre: Country
- Length: 2:41
- Label: Capitol Nashville
- Songwriters: Bart Butler; Justin Ebach; John Pierce
- Producers: Bart Butler; Ryan Gore; Jon Pardi

Jon Pardi singles chronology
"Longneck Way to Go" (2022)	"Your Heart or Mine" (2022)	"Cowboys and Plowboys" (2023)

"Your Heart or Mine" is a song by American country music singer Jon Pardi. It was released on October 3, 2022, as the second single from his fourth studio album Mr. Saturday Night. The song was written by Bart Butler, Justin Ebach, and John Pierce.

== History ==
An uncredited article in ABC Radio describes the song as a "edgy, fiddle-heavy number" about a man beginning a relationship with a woman. On the chorus, Pardi sings the lyric "It's just a matter of time / 'Til it finds your heart or mine."

Pardi filmed the song's music video in San Miguel de Allende, Mexico, with Carlos Ruiz as director. The video features him and model Paula Montes.

== Chart performance ==
=== Weekly charts ===
Weekly chart performance
Chart (2022–2023)	Peak position
Canada Hot 100 (Billboard)	53
Canada Country (Billboard)	3
US Billboard Hot 100	47
US Country Airplay (Billboard)	4
US Hot Country Songs (Billboard)	11

=== Year-end charts ===
Year-end chart performance
Chart (2023)	Position
US Country Airplay (Billboard)	15
US Hot Country Songs (Billboard)	31
US Radio Songs (Billboard)	66

== Certifications ==
Certifications for "Your Heart or Mine"
Region	Certification	Certified units/sales
Canada (Music Canada)	Platinum	80,000^{‡}
United States (RIAA)	Platinum	1,000,000^{‡}
^{‡} Sales+streaming figures based on certification alone.
