= Friday Night Heartbreaker =

2024 single by Jon Pardi

Single by Jon Pardi

from the album Honkytonk Hollywood
- Released: September 6, 2024
- Genre: Country
- Length: 3:25
- Label: Capitol Nashville
- Songwriters: Jessie Jo Dillon; Ryan Hurd; Josh Miller; Daniel Ross; Chris Tompkins
- Producer: Jay Joyce

Jon Pardi singles chronology
"Cowboys and Plowboys" (2023)	"Friday Night Heartbreaker" (2024)	"Boots Off" (2026)

Music video
- "Friday Night Heartbreaker" on YouTube

"Friday Night Heartbreaker" is a song by American country music singer Jon Pardi. It was released on September 6, 2024, as the lead single from his fifth studio album, Honkytonk Hollywood (2025). It was written by Jessie Jo Dillon, Ryan Hurd, Josh Miller, Daniel Ross, and Chris Tompkins, and produced by Jay Joyce.

== Background ==
Jon Pardi had wanted to work with Jay Joyce since he listened to Eric Church's album Carolina. When Pardi first heard "Friday Night Heartbreaker", he was immediately captivated and wanted to record it. He recorded with the touring band from his previous album, Merry Christmas from Jon Pardi, as he believed they were suited for the song. Two band members played the guitar, while Rob McNally performed a guitar solo.

== Composition ==
The song is composed of electric and steel guitar and a fiddle. Lyrically, Jon Pardi warns about an alluring woman and the dangers of being seduced by her. He details how a man is feeling as he looks at her beautiful features and him resisting the temptation to spend time with her, reminding that she is guaranteed to break the hearts of those whom she attracts.

== Critical reception ==
Mary Claire Crabtree of Whiskey Riff gave a positive review, writing "'Friday Night Heartbreaker' is the perfect single to follow his last record, Mr. Saturday Night. The swanky melody of the track instantly draws you in, and a catch [sic] guitar riff is the cherry on top of the cake. Before Pardi sings a word, you know this song will be a heater." She additionally described the melody as "captivating" and the "perfect pair" to the song's lyrical content.

== Music video ==
An official music video was directed by Jim Wright and released on January 7, 2025. In it, Jon Pardi appears in Printer's Alley, illuminated only by headlights of his sleek black car and the string lights connecting the two brick buildings. He wears a black cowboy hat and matching leather jacket as he performs the song with a guitar. Meanwhile, a woman invites a lonesome cowboy to the bar. Various circus acts are performed at the bar and in the background, including sword swallowing, acrobatics, fire breathing and fortune telling, each of which cause the cowboy to become increasingly fascinated in the woman. At the end of the video, she leaves him and escapes by stepping into Pardi's car.

In regard to the filming of the video, Pardi said:

I always enjoy filming with Jim Wright, even if it means being in Printer's Alley until 2 AM. You really see some wild characters down there at that hour. One of my favorite parts of the shoot was chatting with the actors and actresses who performed the circus stunts—they were amazing!

== Personnel ==
- Jon Pardi – vocals, acoustic guitar
- Jay Joyce – production, mixing, synthesizer, programming, acoustic guitar, electric guitar
- Kevin Murphy – drums
- Rob McNelley – electric guitar
- Terry Palmer – electric guitar, background vocals
- Lee Francis – bass
- Derek Bahr – electric guitar
- Jeff Hyde – acoustic guitar
- Matt Heasley – keyboards
- Billy McClaran – fiddle
- Alex Cordell – steel guitar
- Andrew Mendelson – mastering
- Jason Hall – mixing, engineering
- Bobby Louden – recording, engineering assistance
- Jimmy Mansfield – recording, engineering assistance
- Court Blankenship – production coordination

== Charts ==
=== Weekly charts ===
Weekly chart performance for "Friday Night Heartbreaker"
Chart (2024–2025)	Peak position
Canada Country (Billboard)	19
US Bubbling Under Hot 100 (Billboard)	3
US Country Airplay (Billboard)	9
US Hot Country Songs (Billboard)	30

=== Year-end charts ===
Year-end chart performance for "Friday Night Heartbreaker"
Chart (2025)	Position
US Country Airplay (Billboard)	21
