= Tequila Little Time =

2021 single by Jon Pardi

Single by Jon Pardi

from the album Heartache Medication
- Released: January 18, 2021
- Genre: Country
- Length: 3:27
- Label: Capitol Nashville
- Songwriters: Luke Laird; Jon Pardi; Rhett Akins
- Producers: Bart Butler; Jon Pardi; Ryan Gore

Jon Pardi singles chronology
"Ain't Always the Cowboy" (2020)	"Tequila Little Time" (2021)	"Getting Over Him" (2021)

Music video
- "Tequila Little Time" on YouTube

"Tequila Little Time" is a song recorded by American country music singer Jon Pardi. It was released on January 18, 2021, as the third single from his third studio album Heartache Medication. The song was written by Pardi, along Luke Laird and Rhett Akins, and produced by Pardi, Bart Butler and Ryan Gore.

== Background ==
In an interview, Pardi called "Tequila Little Time" a fun and relaxing song, with a flavor of mariachi horns: "I feel like this goes great on a boat, a lake or pool and just any kind of atmosphere of having a good time. It's about picking up a girl that's down and maybe, maybe we want to do a shot of tequila? There's no answer, but maybe."

== Music video ==
The music video was released on May 6, 2021, directed by Carlos Ruiz. It was shot at Flora-Bama Yacht Club in Orange Beach, Alabama.

== Live performance ==
Jon Pardi performed "Tequila Little Time" on NBC's The Tonight Show Starring Jimmy Fallon.

== Charts ==
=== Weekly charts ===
Weekly chart performance for "Tequila Little Time"
Chart (2021–2022)	Peak position
Canada Hot 100 (Billboard)	62
Canada Country (Billboard)	3
US Billboard Hot 100	60
US Country Airplay (Billboard)	5
US Hot Country Songs (Billboard)	14

=== Year-end charts ===
Year-end chart performance for "Tequila Little Time"
Chart (2021)	Position
US Country Airplay (Billboard)	47
US Hot Country Songs (Billboard)	69

2022 year-end chart performance for "Tequila Little Time"
Chart (2022)	Position
US Country Airplay (Billboard)	53
US Hot Country Songs (Billboard)	77

== Certifications ==
Certifications for "Tequila Little Time"
Region	Certification	Certified units/sales
Canada (Music Canada)	Platinum	80,000^{‡}
United States (RIAA)	Platinum	1,000,000^{‡}
^{‡} Sales+streaming figures based on certification alone.
