= Country Music Association Award for Musician of the Year =

Category of annual music award

- Country: United States
- Presented by: Country Music Association
- First award: 1967; 59 years ago
- Currently held by: Charlie Worsham (2026)

The following list shows the recipients for the Country Music Association Award for Musician of the Year. First presented at the inaugural CMA Awards in 1967 to Chet Atkins as the Instrumentalist of the Year award, the category received its current name at the 1988 CMA Awards.

The inaugural recipient of the award was guitarist Chet Atkins, who won in 1967. Atkins and Mac McAnally hold the record for most wins in the category, with ten each, while pedal steel player Paul Franklin has a leading thirty three nominations without ever winning, finally winning for the first time in 2025 at the 59th Annual Country Music Association Awards. The first female nominee and winner in this category is fiddle player Jenee Fleenor, who first won at the 53rd Annual Country Music Association Awards in 2019. The current holder of the award is Charlie Worsham.

== Recipients ==
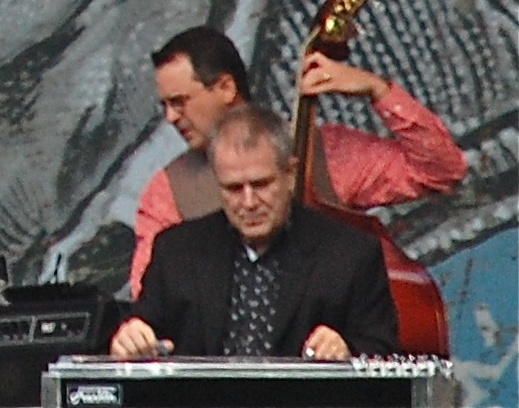
Paul Franklin has a leading thirty-three nominations in this category, finally winning in 2025.

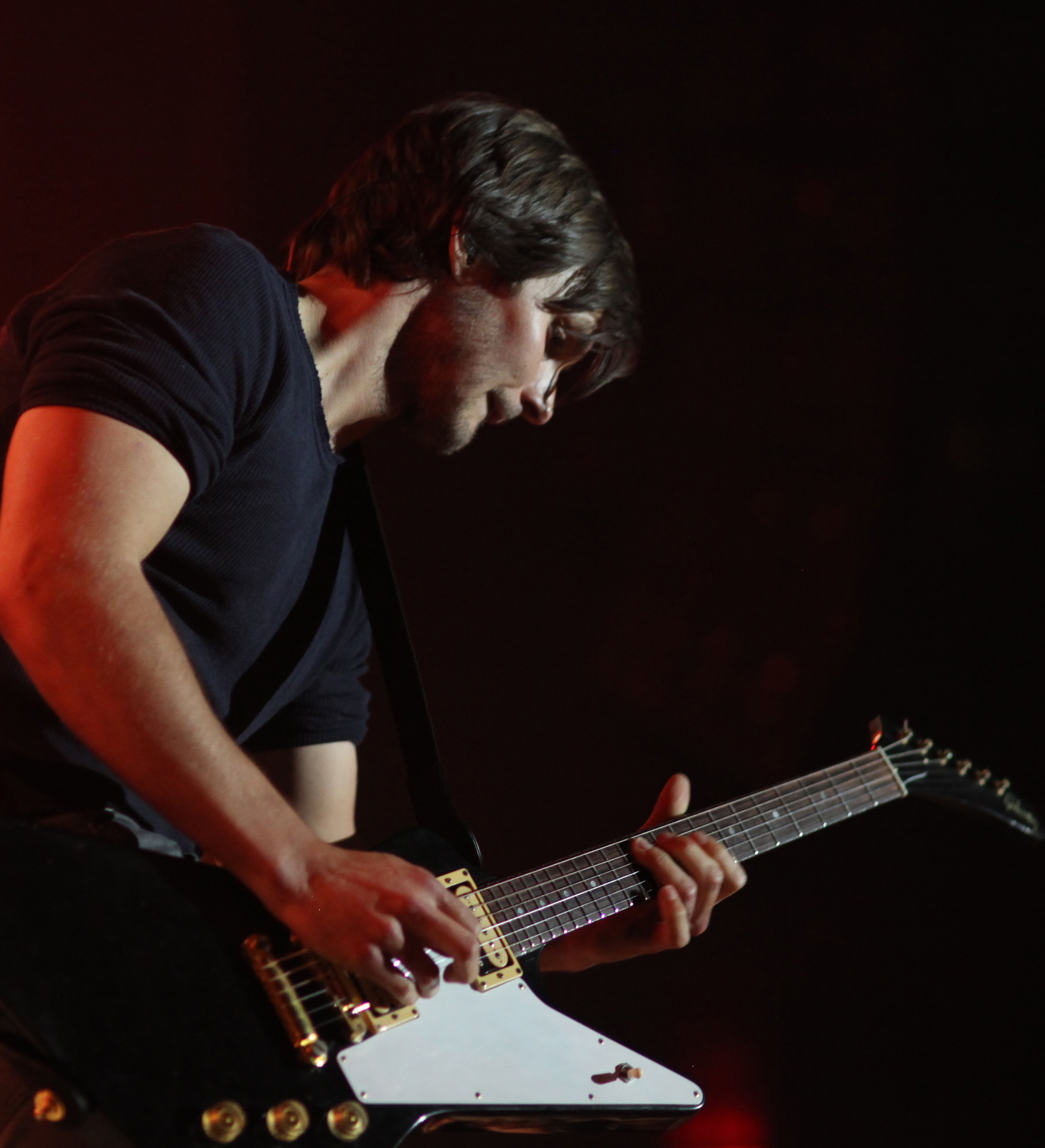
2024 winner and two-time nominee Charlie Worsham.

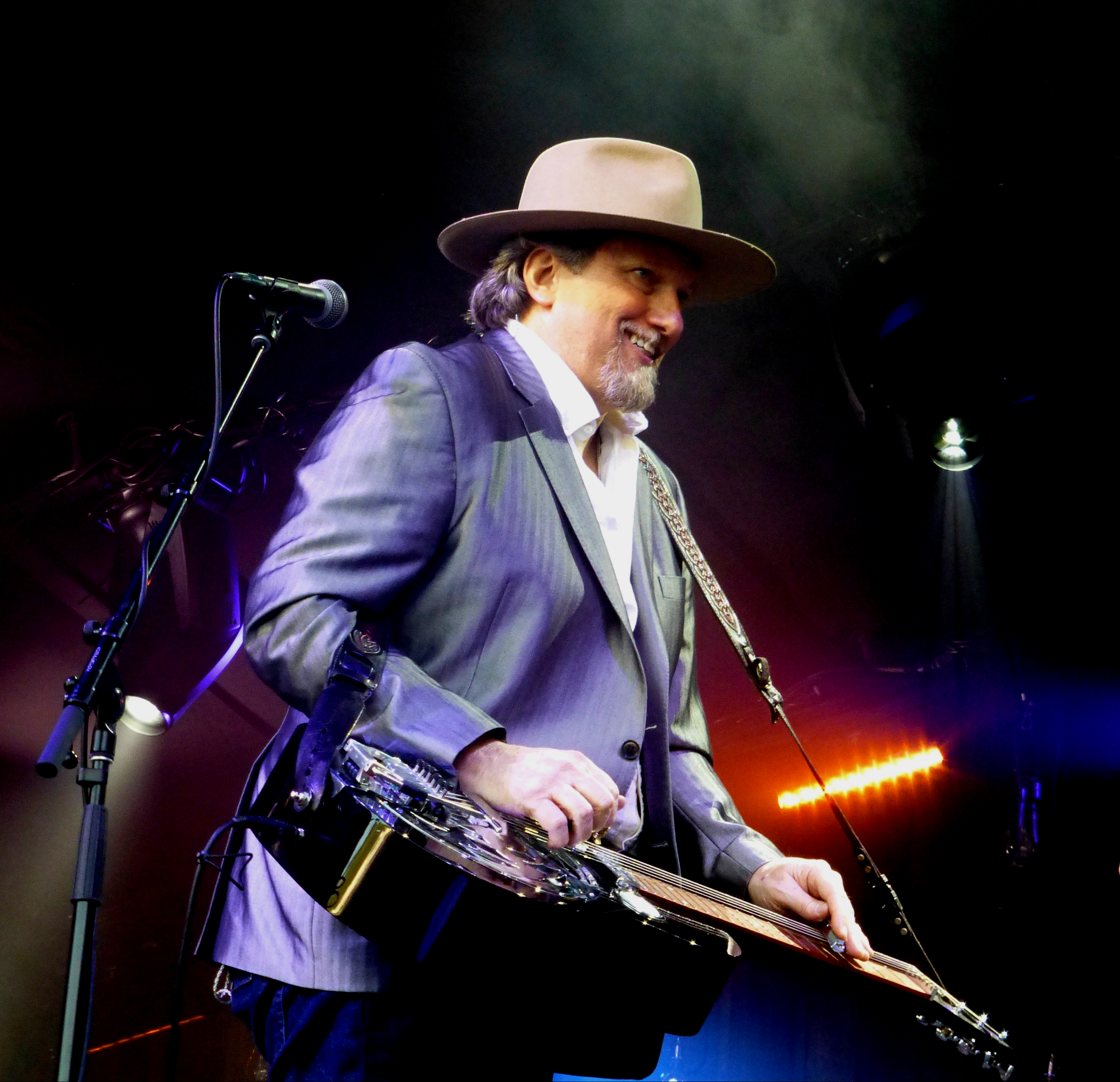
Three-time recipient Jerry Douglas is known for playing dobro with Alison Krauss and Union Station.

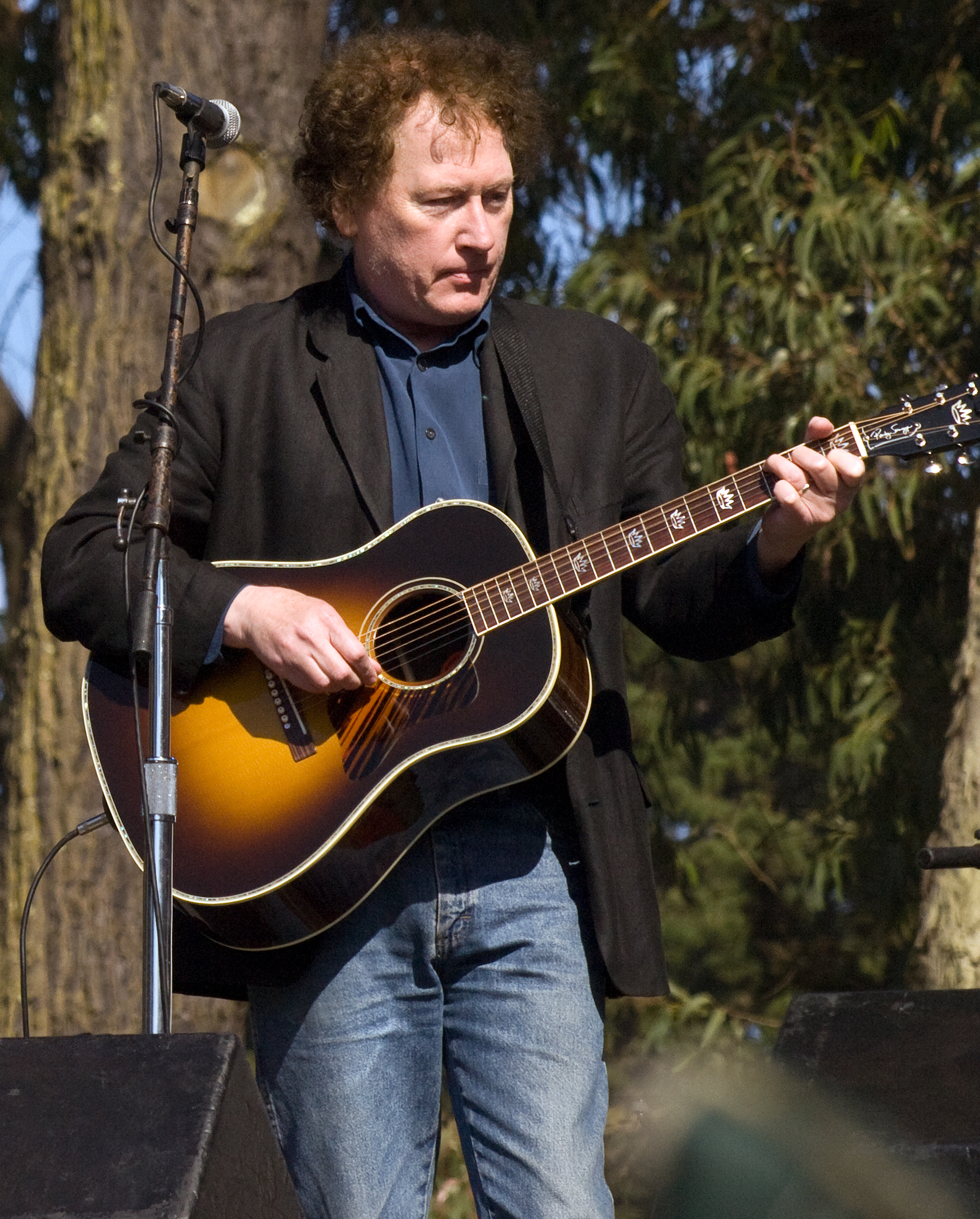
Three-time winner Randy Scruggs.

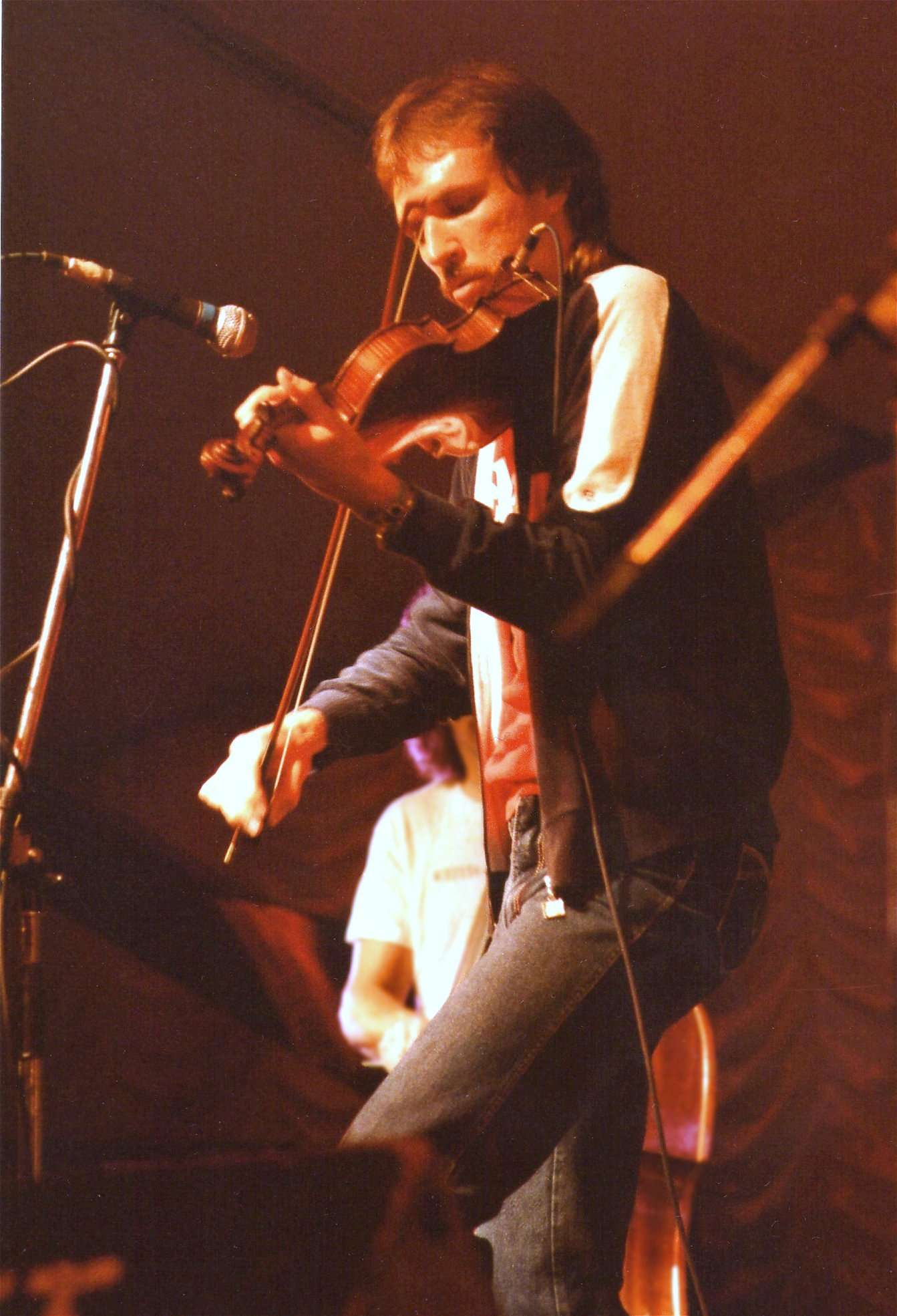
Fiddle player Mark O'Connor is a six-time winner.

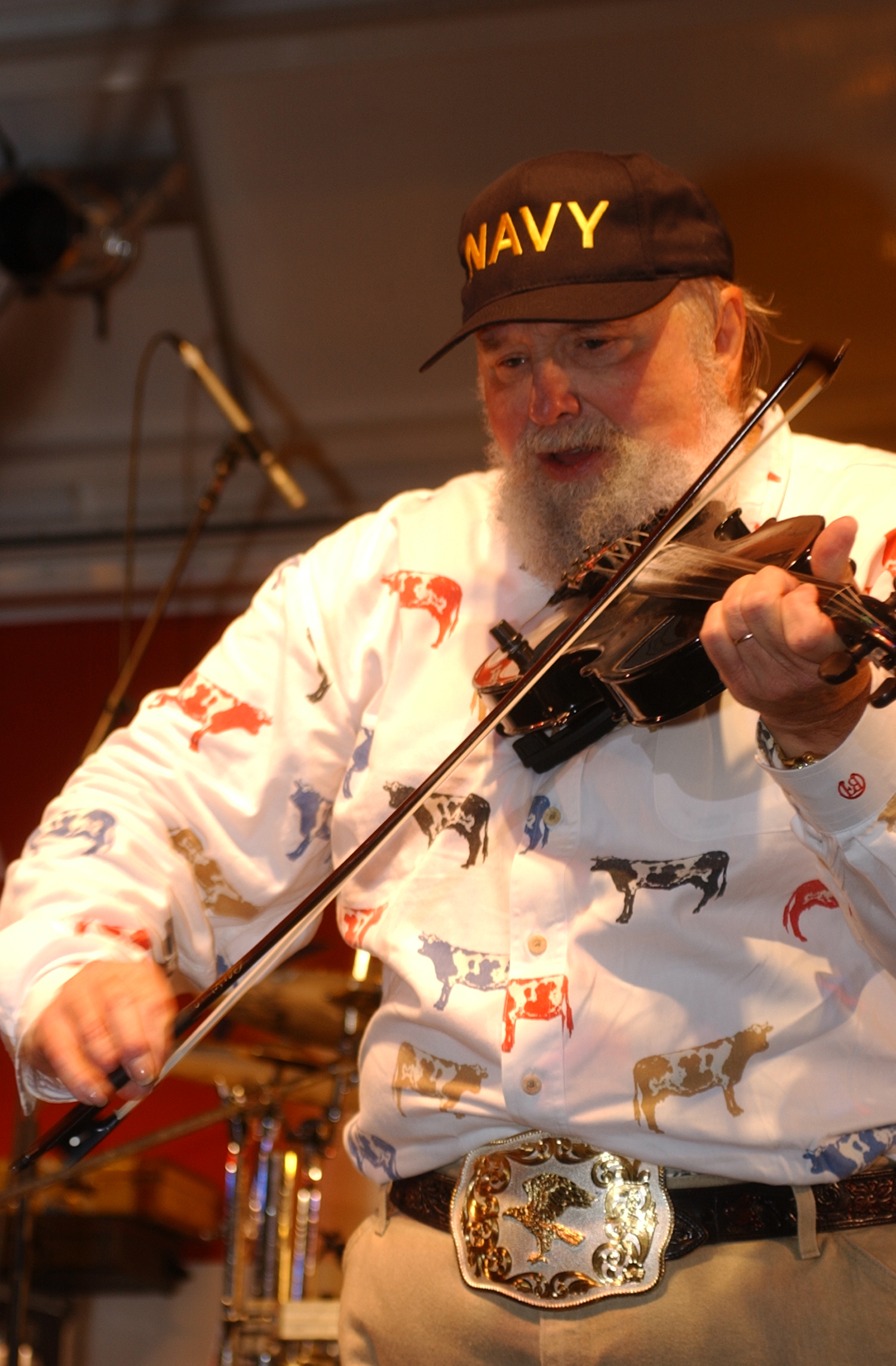
Charlie Daniels received the award in 1979.

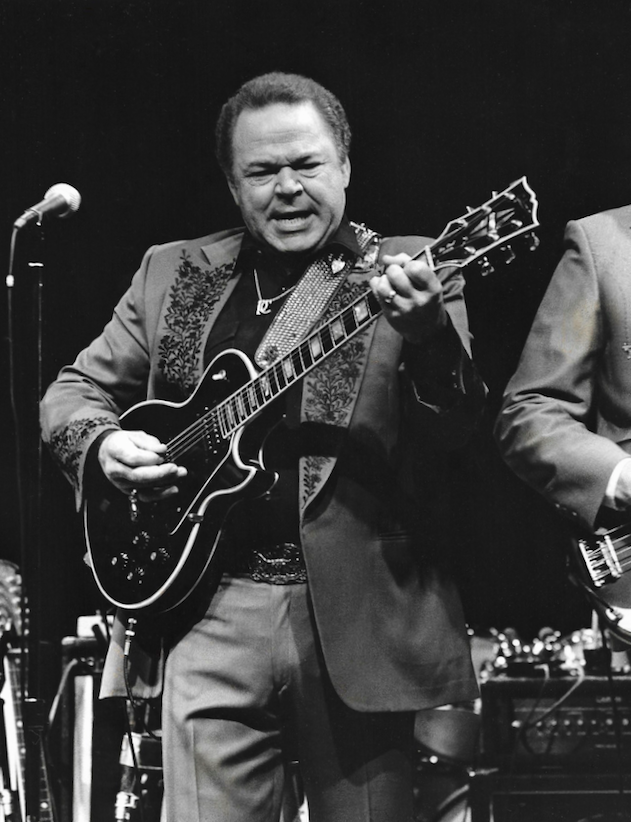
Roy Clark won the award three times.

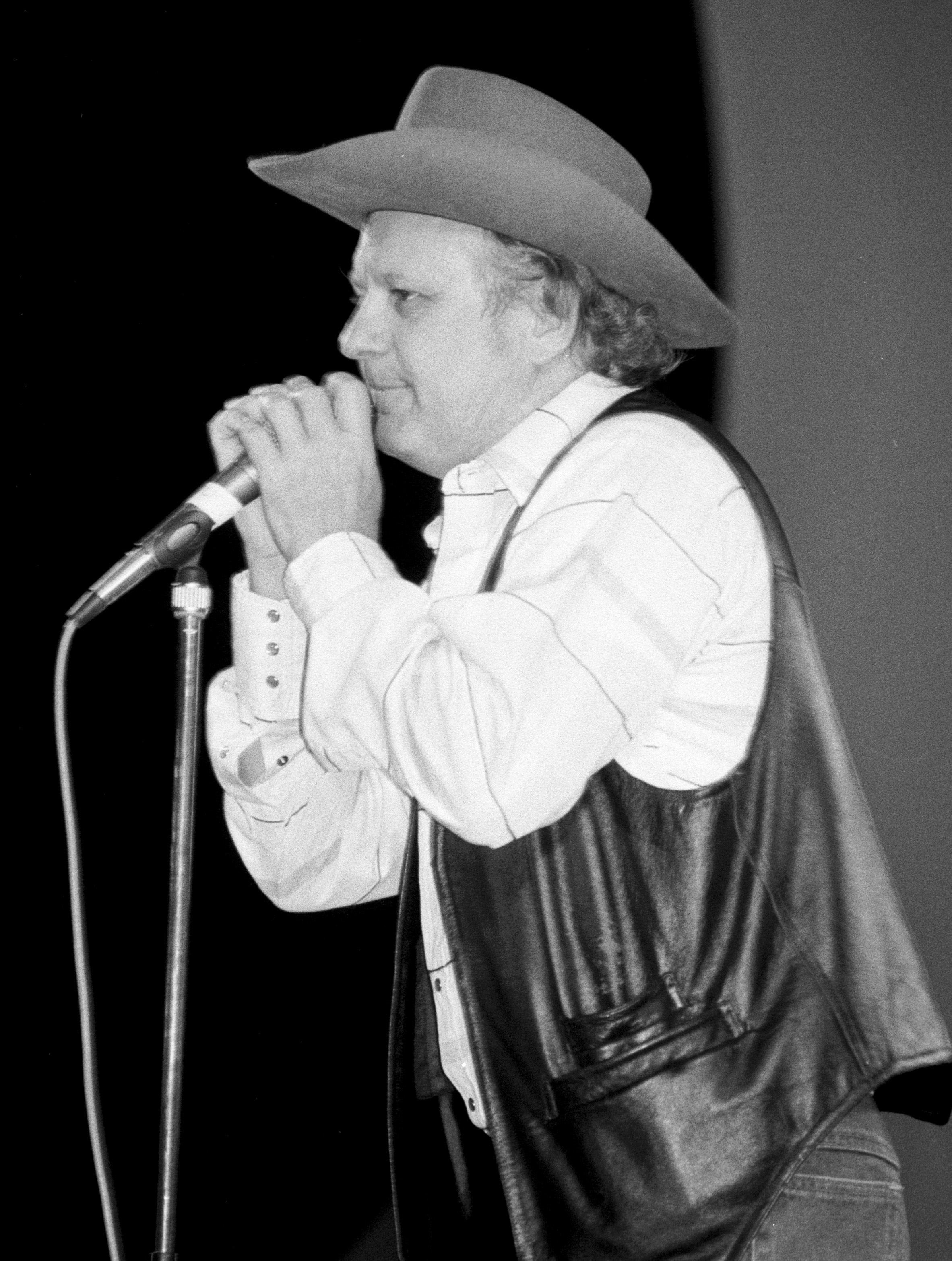
Two-time recipient Charlie McCoy.

Year	Winner	Nominees
2026	Charlie Worsham	Tom Bukovac; Jenee Fleenor; Paul Franklin; Rob McNelley
2025	Paul Franklin	Jenee Fleenor; Brent Mason; Rob McNelley; Derek Wells
2024	Charlie Worsham	Tom Bukovac; Jenee Fleenor; Paul Franklin; Rob McNelley
2023	Jenee Fleenor	Paul Franklin; Rob McNelley; Derek Wells; Charlie Worsham
2022	Jenee Fleenor	Paul Franklin; Brent Mason; Ilya Toshinskiy; Derek Wells
2021	Jenee Fleenor	Paul Franklin; Aaron Sterling; Ilya Toshinsky; Derek Wells
2020	Jenee Fleenor	Paul Franklin; Rob McNelley; Ilya Toshinsky; Derek Wells
2019	Jenee Fleenor	Paul Franklin; Mac McAnally; Ilya Toshinsky; Derek Wells
2018	Mac McAnally	Jerry Douglas; Paul Franklin; Dann Huff; Derek Wells
2017	Mac McAnally	Jerry Douglas; Paul Franklin; Dann Huff; Derek Wells
2016	Dann Huff	Jerry Douglas; Paul Franklin; Brent Mason; Derek Wells
2015	Mac McAnally	Sam Bush; Jerry Douglas; Paul Franklin; Dann Huff
2014	Mac McAnally	Sam Bush; Jerry Douglas; Paul Franklin; Dann Huff
2013	Mac McAnally	Sam Bush; Paul Franklin; Dann Huff; Brent Mason
2012	Mac McAnally	Sam Bush; Paul Franklin; Dann Huff; Brent Mason
2011	Mac McAnally	Sam Bush; Jerry Douglas; Paul Franklin; Dann Huff
2010	Mac McAnally	Paul Franklin; Dann Huff; Brent Mason; Randy Scruggs
2009	Mac McAnally	Eddie Bayers; Paul Franklin; Dann Huff; Brent Mason
2008	Mac McAnally	Jerry Douglas; Paul Franklin; Dann Huff; Brent Mason
2007	Jerry Douglas	Eddie Bayers; Dann Huff; Mac McAnally; Randy Scruggs
2006	Randy Scruggs	Eddie Bayers; Jerry Douglas; Paul Franklin; Dann Huff; Brent Mason
2005	Jerry Douglas	Paul Franklin; Dann Huff; Brent Mason; Randy Scruggs
2004	Dann Huff	Matt Chamberlain; Kenny Greenberg; Larry Paxton; Brent Rowan
2003	Randy Scruggs	Jerry Douglas; Paul Franklin; Aubrey Haynie; Brent Mason
2002	Jerry Douglas	Glen Duncan; Paul Franklin; Dann Huff; Brent Mason
2001	Dann Huff	Stuart Duncan; Paul Franklin; John Hobbs; Brent Mason
2000	Hargus "Pig" Robbins	Paul Franklin; Dann Huff; Brent Mason; Brent Rowan
1999	Randy Scruggs	Eddie Bayers; Paul Franklin; Dann Huff; Brent Mason
1998	Brent Mason	Eddie Bayers; Paul Franklin; Matt Rollings; Brent Rowan
1997	Brent Mason	Eddie Bayers; Paul Franklin; Matt Rollings; Brent Rowan
1996	Mark O'Connor	Eddie Bayers; Paul Franklin; Brent Mason; Matt Rollings
1995	Mark O'Connor	Eddie Bayers; Paul Franklin; Brent Mason; Matt Rollings
1994	Mark O'Connor	Eddie Bayers; Brent Mason; Matt Rollings; Brent Rowan
1993	Mark O'Connor	John Barlow Jarvis; Paul Franklin; Brent Mason; Matt Rollings
1992	Mark O'Connor	Eddie Bayers; Larrie Londin; Matt Rollings; Brent Rowan
1991	Mark O'Connor	Chet Atkins; Barry Beckett; Paul Franklin; Matt Rollings
1990	Johnny Gimble	Jerry Douglas; Paul Franklin; Mark O'Connor; Brent Rowan
1989	Johnny Gimble	Jerry Douglas; Paul Franklin; Mark O'Connor; Don Potter
1988	Chet Atkins	David Briggs; Jerry Douglas; Johnny Gimble; Mark O'Connor
1987	Johnny Gimble	Jerry Douglas; Mark O'Connor
1986	Johnny Gimble	Jerry Douglas; Doyle Grisham; Mark O'Connor
1985	Chet Atkins	Floyd Cramer; Johnny Gimble; Hargus "Pig" Robbins; Buddy Spicher
1984	Chet Atkins	Roy Clark; Floyd Cramer; Charlie McCoy; Hargus "Pig" Robbins
1983	Chet Atkins	Johnny Gimble; Charlie McCoy; Hargus "Pig" Robbins; Buddy Spicher
1982	Chet Atkins	Floyd Cramer; Johnny Gimble; Charlie McCoy; Hargus "Pig" Robbins
1981	Chet Atkins	Floyd Cramer; Johnny Gimble; Charlie McCoy; Hargus "Pig" Robbins
1980	Roy Clark	Chet Atkins; Floyd Cramer; Johnny Gimble; Charlie McCoy
1979	Charlie Daniels	Chet Atkins; Roy Clark; Buddy Emmons; Charlie McCoy
1978	Roy Clark	Chet Atkins; Johnny Gimble; Charlie McCoy; Jerry Reed
1977	Roy Clark	Chet Atkins; Johnny Gimble; Charlie McCoy; Hargus "Pig" Robbins
1976	Hargus "Pig" Robbins	Chet Atkins; Roy Clark; Johnny Gimble; Charlie McCoy
1975	Johnny Gimble	Chet Atkins; Roy Clark; Charlie McCoy; Jerry Reed
1974	Don Rich	Chet Atkins; Roy Clark; Lloyd Green; Charlie McCoy
1973	Charlie McCoy	Chet Atkins; Roy Clark; Floyd Cramer; Lloyd Green; Jerry Reed
1972	Charlie McCoy	Chet Atkins; Roy Clark; Floyd Cramer; Jerry Reed
1971	Jerry Reed	Chet Atkins; Roy Clark; Floyd Cramer; Boots Randolph
1970	Jerry Reed	Chet Atkins; Roy Clark; Floyd Cramer; Merle Travis
1969	Chet Atkins	Roy Clark; Floyd Cramer; Jerry Reed; John Rich
1968	Chet Atkins	Glen Campbell; Roy Clark; Floyd Cramer; Boots Randolph
1967	Chet Atkins	Roy Clark; Floyd Cramer; Pete Drake; Boots Randolph

== Musicians with multiple wins ==
Musicians that received multiple awards
Awards	Artist
10	Mac McAnally
8	Chet Atkins
6	Mark O'Connor
5	Jenee Fleenor
5	Johnny Gimble
3	Dann Huff
3	Jerry Douglas
3	Randy Scruggs
3	Roy Clark
2	Brent Mason
2	Charlie McCoy
2	Hargus "Pig" Robbins
2	Jerry Reed

== Musicians with multiple nominations ==
34 nominations

- Paul Franklin

21 nominations

- Chet Atkins

20 nominations

- Brent Mason

19 nominations

- Dann Huff

17 nominations

- Jerry Douglas

15 nominations

- Roy Clark

14 nominations

- Johnny Gimble

13 nominations

- Charlie McCoy

12 nominations

- Floyd Cramer
- Mac McAnally

11 nominations

- Mark O'Connor

10 nominations

- Eddie Bayers

8 nominations

- Derek Wells
- Hargus "Pig" Robbins
- Matt Rollings

7 nominations

- Brent Rowan
- Jerry Reed
- Jenee Fleenor

6 nominations

- Randy Scruggs

5 nominations

- Sam Bush

4 nominations

- Ilya Toshinskiy
- Rob McNelley

3 nominations

- Boots Randolph
- Charlie Worsham

2 nominations

- Tom Bukovac
- Buddy Spicher
- Lloyd Green
