= Ain't Always the Cowboy =

Single by Jon Pardi

from the album Heartache Medication
- Released: March 16, 2020
- Genre: Country
- Length: 3:39
- Label: Capitol Nashville
- Songwriters: Brandon Kinney; Josh Thompson
- Producers: Jon Pardi; Bart Butler; Ryan Gore

Jon Pardi singles chronology
"Beer Can't Fix" (2020)	"Ain't Always the Cowboy" (2020)	"Tequila Little Time" (2021)

Music video
- "Ain't Always The Cowboy" on YouTube

"Ain't Always the Cowboy" is a song by American country music singer Jon Pardi. It was released on March 16, 2020 as the second single from his third studio album Heartache Medication. The track is about a non-committal woman that uses Western iconography. "Ain't Always the Cowboy" peaked at numbers three and six on Billboard's Country Airplay and Hot Country Songs charts respectively. It also reached number 55 on the Hot 100. It was certified two-times platinum by the Recording Industry Association of America (RIAA), denoting sales of over two million units in the United States. The song achieved similar success in Canada, giving Pardi his fifth number-one hit on the Country chart, and peaked at number 52 on the Canadian Hot 100. The accompanying music video for the single, directed by Carlos Ruiz, features Pardi barrel racing.

== Content and history ==
The song was written by Brandon Kinney and Josh Thompson. It uses Western imagery to describe a woman who does not want to commit to a relationship. Pardi told the blog Taste of Country, ""I feel like the topic of the song hasn't been written about in this way, and I love songs that approach things differently and offer fresh perspectives".

Thompson upon meeting Kinney, only had the title in mind, and after the two writers began drinking beer together, they came up with the idea for the song. The demo, featuring vocals from Thompson, was then sent to Kinney's cousin Bart Butler, who is also Pardi's producer. Butler chose for the song to be recorded at a faster tempo than the demo, adding prominent fiddle from Jenee Fleenor and a lead guitar from Rob McNelley, along with several backing vocals all sung by session vocalist Russell Terrell. Taste of Country writer Cillea Houghton described the song as "put[ting] as much focus on the restless woman who stole the titular cowboy's heart as it does the cowboy himself, tied together with descriptive lyrics".

== Music video ==
Carlos Ruiz directed the music video, which features Pardi barrel racing.

== Chart performance ==
On the week of September 12, 2020, "Ain't Always the Cowboy" debuted at number 99 on the Billboard Hot 100. Eleven weeks later, it peaked at number 55 the week of November 28, and stayed on the chart for eighteen weeks. On the week of December 19, it reached numbers three and six on both the Billboard Country Airplay and Hot Country Songs charts respectively. In Canada, the song debuted at number 100 on the Canadian Hot 100 the week of September 26. Nine weeks later, it reached number 52 the same week it peaked on the Billboard Hot 100, and remained on the chart for fifteen weeks.

=== Weekly charts ===
Chart (2020–2021)	Peak position
Canada Hot 100 (Billboard)	52
Canada Country (Billboard)	1
US Billboard Hot 100	55
US Country Airplay (Billboard)	3
US Hot Country Songs (Billboard)	6

=== Year-end charts ===
Chart (2020)	Position
US Country Airplay (Billboard)	52
US Hot Country Songs (Billboard)	48

Chart (2021)	Position
US Hot Country Songs (Billboard)	89

== Certifications ==
Region	Certification	Certified units/sales
Canada (Music Canada)	Platinum	80,000^{‡}
United States (RIAA)	2× Platinum	2,000,000^{‡}
^{‡} Sales+streaming figures based on certification alone.
