= Night Shift (Jon Pardi song) =

2016 single by Jon Pardi

Single by Jon Pardi

from the album California Sunrise
- Released: July 3, 2018
- Genre: Country
- Length: 2:52
- Label: Capitol Nashville
- Songwriters: Tofer Brown; Phillip LaRue; Billy Montana
- Producers: Jon Pardi; Bart Butler

Jon Pardi singles chronology
"She Ain't in It" (2017)	"Night Shift" (2018)	"Heartache Medication" (2019)

Music video
- "Night Shift" on YouTube

"Night Shift" is a song written by Tofer Brown, Phillip LaRue, and Billy Montana, and recorded by American country music singer Jon Pardi, released as the fifth and final single by Capitol Nashville from his second studio album California Sunrise (2016). It uses the term for working late hours as a description for loving someone so close after a tiring workday. "Night Shift" peaked at numbers five and eight on Billboard's Country Airplay and Hot Country Songs charts respectively. It also reached number 56 on the Hot 100 chart. It was certified 3× Platinum by the Recording Industry Association of America (RIAA), and has sold 95,000 copies in the United States as of April 2019. The song garnered similar success in Canada, reaching number 14 on the Canada Country chart and number 88 on the Canadian Hot 100. An accompanying music video for the song, directed by Jim Wright, features Pardi driving in his truck in Nashville's Lower Broadway.

== Content ==
The song uses the term "night shift" to describe an intimate encounter that the male narrator has with his lover after an exhausting day at work. Bobby Moore of Wide Open Country described the song as "introduc[ing] true love and other real emotions to the sometimes less-than-sensitive airwaves."

== Commercial performance ==
"Night Shift" debuted at number 98 on the Billboard Hot 100 the week of February 9, 2019 and remained there until the week after. It reappeared on the week of March 16 at number 86. Nine weeks later, it peaked at number 56 the week of May 18, and stayed there for sixteen weeks. On September 5, 2023, the song was certified triple platinum by the RIAA in the US for over three million units consumed in the United States. The song has sold 95,000 copies in that country as of April 2019. In Canada, the track debuted at number 99 on the Canadian Hot 100 the week of February 2 and peaked at number 88 the week after. It reappeared at number 96 the week of March 23 and made it to number 90 the next week. The song made its third reappearance on the chart at number 94 the week of May 25, and stayed there for seven weeks.

== Music video ==
The song's music video was directed by Jim Wright and debuted in October 2018. It features Pardi getting out of an 18-wheeler to join his band riding along Lower Broadway in Nashville, Tennessee on the deck of a flatbed at night, as well as solo performance shots on the Shelby Street Bridge.

== Charts ==
=== Weekly charts ===
Chart (2018–2019)	Peak position
Canada (Canadian Hot 100)	88
Canada Country (Billboard)	14
US Billboard Hot 100	56
US Country Airplay (Billboard)	5
US Hot Country Songs (Billboard)	8

=== Year-end charts ===
Chart (2019)	Position
US Country Airplay (Billboard)	31
US Hot Country Songs (Billboard)	32

== Certifications ==
Region	Certification	Certified units/sales
Canada (Music Canada)	4× Platinum	320,000^{‡}
New Zealand (RMNZ)	Gold	15,000^{‡}
United States (RIAA)	3× Platinum	3,000,000^{‡}
^{‡} Sales+streaming figures based on certification alone.
