= Head Over Boots =

Single by Jon Pardi

from the album California Sunrise
- Released: September 14, 2015
- Recorded: 2015
- Genre: Country
- Length: 3:25
- Label: Capitol Nashville
- Songwriters: Jon Pardi; Luke Laird
- Producers: Bart Butler; Jon Pardi

Jon Pardi singles chronology
"When I've Been Drinkin'" (2014)	"Head Over Boots" (2015)	"Dirt on My Boots" (2016)

"Head Over Boots" is a song by American country music artist Jon Pardi. It was released to radio on September 14, 2015, as the lead single to his second album California Sunrise (2016). The song was written by Pardi and Luke Laird. Its Pardi's first number one hit in his career, topping the Billboard Country Airplay chart. It also peaked at numbers four and 51 on both the Hot Country Songs and Hot 100 charts respectively. "Head Over Boots" was certified 7× Platinum by the Recording Industry Association of America (RIAA), and has sold 701,000 copies in that country as of January 2017. The song also charted in Canada, reaching number two on the Canada Country chart and number 64 on the Canadian Hot 100. It was certified 6× Platinum by Music Canada, denoting sales of over 480,000 units in that country. An accompanying music video for the song, directed by Jim Wright, features a band led by Pardi performing for a couple as the former goes through outfit changes and the latter ages as time passes.

== Background ==
The song was written by Pardi and Luke Laird in January 2015 at Laird's Creative Nation office in Nashville. According to Pardi, the song was inspired by watching young and old couples dancing in a Texas dance hall, and he wanted to write a song that people could dance to. The song was produced by Pardi and Bart Butler and recorded at Ocean Way Studios.

The song has a moderate shuffle tempo in the key of G major, with a main chord pattern of G-D-Em-C-Cm. Pardi's vocals range from E_{4} to E_{5}.

== Reception ==
=== Critical ===
An uncredited review from Taste of Country was favorable, saying that it "immediately separates itself from his previous, mostly party-centric cuts" and that the "swinging feel of 'Head Over Boots' is the song's signature. Lyrically the singer and co-writer Luke Laird don't reinvent the love song." In 2017, Billboard contributor Chuck Dauphin put "Head Over Boots" at number two on his top 10 list of Pardi's best songs.

=== Commercial ===
"Head Over Boots" first entered the Billboard Country Airplay chart at number 58 dated October 17, 2015 before its official release, and entered the Hot Country Songs chart two weeks later at number 43. It reached number one on the Country Airplay chart dated August 27, 2016, which is Pardi's first number-one hit on that chart. On the Billboard Hot 100, the single debuted at number 97 for the week of March 19, 2016. It peaked at number 51 the week of August 13, and stayed on the chart for twenty-four weeks. It was certified seven-times platinum by the Recording Industry Association of America (RIAA) on November 21, 2025. The song has sold 701,000 copies in the United States as of January 2017.

In Canada, it debuted at number 96 on the Canadian Hot 100 chart dated July 2, 2016, peaking at number 61 on the week of September 3, and stayed on the chart for thirteen weeks. The track was certified six-times platinum by Music Canada on February 26, 2025.

== Music video ==
The music video was directed by Jim Wright and premiered in April 2016. The video features Jon Pardi fronting a band whose outfit changes through time, from that of an old school honky tonk band to more modern ones, playing music that serves as background to the life of a couple from their courtship to old age.

== Live performance ==
On July 7, 2016, Pardi performed the song live on NBC's Today.

== Charts ==
=== Weekly charts ===
Chart (2015–2016)	Peak position
Canada Hot 100 (Billboard)	64
Canada Country (Billboard)	2
US Billboard Hot 100	51
US Country Airplay (Billboard)	1
US Hot Country Songs (Billboard)	4

=== Year end charts ===
Chart (2016)	Position
US Country Airplay (Billboard)	1
US Hot Country Songs (Billboard)	5

== Certifications and sales ==
Region	Certification	Certified units/sales
Canada (Music Canada)	6× Platinum	480,000^{‡}
New Zealand (RMNZ)	Platinum	30,000^{‡}
United States (RIAA)	7× Platinum	7,000,000^{‡} / 701,000
^{‡} Sales+streaming figures based on certification alone.
