= Write You a Song =

Studio album by Jon Pardi
- Released: January 14, 2014
- Genre: Neotraditional country
- Length: 38:44
- Label: Capitol Nashville
- Producer: Bart Butler; Jon Pardi

Jon Pardi chronology
Write You a Song (2014)	California Sunrise (2016)

Singles from Write You a Song
- 1. "Missin' You Crazy" Released: March 26, 2012; 2. "Up All Night" Released: March 11, 2013; 3. "What I Can't Put Down" Released: March 17, 2014; 4. "When I've Been Drinkin'" Released: September 22, 2014

Write You a Song is the debut studio album by American country music artist Jon Pardi. It was released on January 14, 2014, through Capitol Nashville. The album includes the singles "Missin' You Crazy", "Up All Night", "What I Can't Put Down", and "When I've Been Drinkin'." It was certified gold in the United States by the Recording Industry Association of America (RIAA).

== Promotion ==
On February 12, 2014, Pardi opened alongside Chase Rice and Chris Young for Dierks Bentley on his Riser Tour. On August 5, he announced the Up All Night Tour, a 20-city North American fall promotion that began on October 10 in Lincoln, Nebraska and December 20 in Columbus, Ohio.

== Critical reception ==
Professional ratings
Review scores
Source	Rating
AllMusic	3.5/5 stars
Country Weekly	A−
Digital Journal	4/5 stars
Got Country Online	4/5 stars
Roughstock	4/5 stars

Write You a Song received unanimously positive reception by music critics. At Country Weekly, Jon Freeman graded the album an A−, proclaiming that "We'll raise a glass to that." Steve Leggett of AllMusic rated the album three-and-a-half stars, stating that "The playing, production, and sound on Write You a Song are solid and professional, with enough edge to keep it from being simply predictable." At Digital Journal, Markos Papadatos rated the album four stars, saying that "Jon Pardi does a decent job on his debut studio album and hopefully, he will have more hits from it." Matt Bjorke of Roughstock rated the album four stars, writing that "The melodies are interesting, the songwriting is tight and Pardi is in strong voice throughout Write You A Song, which is all anyone can ask from a debut album and for anyone looking for someone to anoint as a potential ‘savior’ of Country music, Pardi may just be that guy for you." At Got Country Online, Tara Toro rated the album four stars, highlighting the album as "a cohesive package of country music that you’ll want to listen to again and again."

In 2017, Billboard contributor Chuck Dauphin placed three tracks from the album on his top 10 list of Pardi's best songs: "When I've Been Drinkin'" at number four, "What I Can't Put Down" at number six and "That Man" at number nine.

== Track listing ==
No.	Title	Writer(s)	Length
1.	"What I Can't Put Down"	Jon Pardi; Bart Butler; Brice Long	3:23
2.	"Up All Night"	Pardi; Butler; Brett Beavers	3:32
3.	"Write You a Song"	Pardi; Butler; Dave Ulbrich	3:06
4.	"That Man"	Pardi; Casey Beathard	3:34
5.	"Missin' You Crazy"	Pardi; Butler; Monty Holmes	3:19
6.	"Happens All the Time"	Pardi; Kent Agee; Burton Collins	3:22
7.	"Trash a Hotel Room"	Aaron Goodvin; Matt Jenkins	3:46
8.	"Chasin' Them Better Days"	Pardi; Beathard; Shane Minor	4:24
9.	"Love You from Here"	Pardi; Butler; Jimmy Melton	3:33
10.	"Empty Beer Cans"	Pardi; Kent Blazy; Tia Sillers	3:29
11.	"When I've Been Drinkin'"	Pardi; Butler; Jeremy Spillman	3:18
Total length:			38:44

== Personnel ==
Adapted from the album's liner notes.

Musicians

- Howie Adams — percussion
- Brett Beavers — programming
- J. T. Corenflos — electric guitar
- Howard Duck — piano, Fender Rhodes, Wurlitzer electric piano, accordion, Hammond B-3 organ
- Dan Dugmore — electric guitar, pedal steel guitar
- Jenee Fleenor — fiddle
- Lee Francis — bass guitar, U-bass
- Keith Gattis — mandolin, electric guitar, acoustic guitar, gut string guitar
- Tommy Harden — drums, percussion
- Mike Johnson — pedal steel guitar
- Andy Leftwich — fiddle, mandolin, ganjo
- Rob McNelley — electric guitar
- Jimmy Melton — banjo
- Terry Lee Palmer — background vocals
- Jon Pardi — lead vocals, acoustic guitar, electric guitar, ganjo
- Brian Pruitt — drums, percussion
- Joe Spivey — acoustic guitar, fiddle
- Russell Terrell — background vocals
- Robby Turner — pedal steel guitar

Technical

- Bart Butler — production
- T.W. Cargile — recording
- Ryan Gore — recording, mixing
- Andrew Mendelson — mastering
- Jon Pardi — production
- Jarod Snowden — digital editing

== Chart performance ==
The album debuted at number 14 on the Billboard 200 chart, and number three on the Top Country Albums chart, with 17,000 copies sold in its debut week. As of February 2016, the album has sold 85,000 copies in the U.S.

=== Weekly charts ===
Chart (2014)	Peak position
US Billboard 200	14
US Top Country Albums (Billboard)	3

=== Year-end charts ===
Chart (2014)	Position
US Top Country Albums (Billboard)	72

== Certifications ==
Certifications and sales for Write You a Song
Region	Certification	Certified units/sales
United States (RIAA)	Gold	500,000^{‡}
^{‡} Sales+streaming figures based on certification alone.
