= When I've Been Drinkin' =

Single by Jon Pardi

from the album Write You a Song
- Released: September 22, 2014
- Recorded: 2014
- Genre: Country
- Length: 3:18
- Label: Capitol Nashville
- Songwriters: Bart Butler; Jon Pardi; Jeremy Spillman
- Producers: Bart Butler; Jon Pardi

Jon Pardi singles chronology
"What I Can't Put Down" (2014)	"When I've Been Drinkin'" (2014)	"Head Over Boots" (2015)

"When I've Been Drinkin'" is a song co-written and recorded by American country music artist Jon Pardi. It was released on September 22, 2014 as the fourth and final single from Pardi's debut studio album Write You a Song (2014). The song was written by Pardi, Bart Butler and Jeremy Spillman. It garnered positive reviews from music critics. "When I've Been Drinkin'" peaked at numbers 36 and 38 on both the Billboard Hot Country Songs and Country Airplay charts respectively. The song was certified Platinum by the Recording Industry Association of America (RIAA), denoting sales of over 1,000,000 units in the United States.

== Critical reception ==
Taste of Country reviewed the song favorably, saying that "With 'When I've Been Drinking,' Jon Pardi eases off the throttle. His previous singles were country-guitar laced anthems, but this new track is more reliant on a slow groove that builds through the final chorus." Matt Bjorke of Roughstock also gave the song a favorable review, saying that "The uniquely talented singer/songwriter (he wrote 10 of the 11 tracks on Write You A Song) brings his California Country swagger to "When I've Been Drinkin'" and showcases why fans have begun to gravitate to his modern brand of honky tonk music. The melody to this single is as strong as Pardi's instantly identifiable voice on the track, which has refreshingly honest lyrics." In 2017, Billboard contributor Chuck Dauphin put "When I've Been Drinkin'" at number four on his top 10 list of Pardi's best songs.

== Chart performance ==
Chart (2014–2015)	Peak position
US Country Airplay (Billboard)	38
US Hot Country Songs (Billboard)	36

== Certifications ==
Region	Certification	Certified units/sales
United States (RIAA)	Platinum	1,000,000^{‡}
^{‡} Sales+streaming figures based on certification alone.
