= California Sunrise =

Studio album by Jon Pardi
- Released: June 17, 2016
- Studio: Ocean Way, Nashville; Blackbird, Nashville
- Genre: Country
- Length: 42:51
- Label: Capitol Nashville
- Producer: Bart Butler; Jon Pardi

Jon Pardi chronology
Write You a Song (2014)	California Sunrise (2016)	Heartache Medication (2019)

Singles from California Sunrise
- 1. "Head Over Boots" Released: September 14, 2015; 2. "Dirt on My Boots" Released: September 19, 2016; 3. "Heartache on the Dance Floor" Released: May 1, 2017; 4. "She Ain't in It" Released: October 23, 2017; 5. "Night Shift" Released: July 3, 2018

California Sunrise is the second studio album by American country music singer Jon Pardi. It was released on June 17, 2016, through Capitol Nashville. Following the success of his debut studio album, Write You a Song (2014), Pardi reteamed with co-producer Bart Butler to work on new material for his next country album, wanting to incorporate more traditional aspects of the genre while adhering to the modern country music template. The album received positive reviews from music critics, who often praised the production and lyrical content.

The accompanying singles "Head Over Boots", "Dirt on My Boots", "Heartache on the Dance Floor", "She Ain't in It", and "Night Shift" were released. California Sunrise debuted at number 11 on the US Billboard 200 and number one on the Top Country Albums chart, giving Pardi his only chart-topping album to date. It was certified platinum in the United States by the Recording Industry Association of America (RIAA). To promote the album, Pardi performed on talk shows, headlined his own concerts and opened for other country artists on their respective tours.

== Background and development ==
Pardi released his debut studio album Write You a Song on January 14, 2014. It garnered favorable reviews from critics, who praised the twangy instrumentation and lyrical content. To promote the album, Pardi spent the rest of 2014 touring across the United States. After the release of his debut EP The B-Sides, 2011–2014 in 2015, Pardi embarked on his All Time High Tour with country music duo the Brothers Osborne, during which he started performing new material for his second country album. Each song was recorded with a full band, as Pardi wanted to create the feel of a live recording. He also wanted them to have the "traditional country soul" while following the genre's modern standards. California Sunrise was co-produced by Bart Butler, who also worked on Write You a Song.

In May 2026, Pardi announced California Sunrise (10th Anniversary Edition), which is scheduled for released on June 12, 2026.

== Music and lyrics ==
The opening track "Out of Style" was described by Pardi as a "song within a song" about an aspiring artist moving to Nashville to write a song that evolves into an ode about the country music tropes used throughout generations, including Jesus and alcohol. Utilizing pedal steel and drums for its melody, the song was noted by Beville Dunkerley of Rolling Stone for having the underlying message of how Pardi's brand of classic country through a modern sound has remained timeless, even as various subgenres have played throughout the airwaves. "Cowboy Hat" was described as Pardi "putting a Bakersfield twist on a song George Strait might have recorded 20 years ago." "Head Over Boots" was created in late 2014, when Pardi was at a Texas dancehall seeing couples dance to Merle Haggard and Bob Wills, and a chorus melody came to his mind that stuck with him as he worked on the instrumentation and lyrics with co-writer Luke Laird in January 2015. "Night Shift" takes the employment term to describe an intimate encounter that a male worker has with his lover after an exhausting day at work. "Can't Turn You Down" revolves around a man with awareness that he is better off leaving his former lover and resisting her, but finds it practically impossible to commit to doing so.

"Dirt on My Boots" is a "blue collar love song" about a man finishing work to get together with his girl. Pardi was initially put off by the track's demo being "super-hip-hop", but fell in love with the lyrics that he added fiddle and steel guitar alongside to give the song more of a country sound. "She Ain't in It" was described as a "slow, fiddle and steel powered love-lost song" about a man attempting to move on after a still hurting breakup. It was originally going to be recorded by Strait but became available for recording by Pardi afterwards. "All Time High" and "Heartache on the Dance Floor" were both written on the same day that Pardi and co-writers Bart Butler and Brice Long were staying in Wichita, Kansas. "Paycheck" is a tribute to the "piece of paper" that workers acquire to support themselves, while they have "a little bit of fun" as well. "Lucky Tonight" revolves around a man "attempting to bounce back from heartache." The closing title track on California Sunrise was created when Pardi wanted to write a West Coast shout-out for telling the story of "the beauty of California and the beauty of a relationship", aiming for it to be accompanied by a modern take on the "heavy acoustic and bouncy sound" associated with Bob Seger, Jackson Browne and Glenn Frey.

== Release and promotion ==
On March 24, 2016, Pardi revealed the album's cover art and track listing. California Sunrise was released on June 17, 2016 by Capitol Nashville.

The lead single from California Sunrise, "Head Over Boots", was released to US country radio stations on September 14, 2015, and gave Pardi his first number one hit on the Billboard Country Airplay chart. It was certified six-times platinum by the Recording Industry Association of America (RIAA) in the US on November 20, 2024. An accompanying music video was directed by Jim Wright and released to Pardi's YouTube channel in April 2016. The album's second single, "Dirt on My Boots", was released on September 19, 2016, and gave Pardi his second number one hit on the Billboard Country Airplay chart. It was also certified six-times platinum by the RIAA in the US on September 26, 2024. The single's music video premiered on February 24, 2017. The third single, "Heartache on the Dance Floor", was released to US country radio stations on May 1, 2017. It peaked at numbers three and five on the Billboard Country Airplay and Hot Country Songs charts, respectively. The song was certified quadraple platinum by the RIAA in the US on October 11, 2023. A music video for the single, directed by Carlos Ruiz, premiered in June 2017. A fourth single, "She Ain't In It", was released on October 23, 2017, and reached numbers 21 and 23 on the Billboard Country Airplay and Hot Country Songs charts, respectively. It was certified Platinum by the RIAA in the US on May 24, 2023. Its music video was directed by Wright and premiered in February 2018. The fifth and final single, "Night Shift", was released on July 3, 2018, and peaked at numbers five and eight on the Billboard Country Airplay and Hot Country Songs charts, respectively. It was certified triple platinum by the RIAA in the US on September 5, 2023. The single's music video was directed by Wright and premiered in October 2018.

On July 7, 2016, Pardi performed "Head Over Boots" on NBC's Today. On October 3 of that year, Pardi was announced as an opening act alongside Cole Swindell for Dierks Bentley on his What the Hell World Tour, starting on January 19, 2017 in Nashville's Bridgestone Arena. On January 31, 2017, Pardi was revealed as one of 26 opening acts that would play alongside Tim McGraw and Faith Hill on their Soul2Soul: The World Tour, with him performing on May 11 at Tulsa's BOK Center and finishing on May 13, 2017 in Oklahoma City's Chesapeake Energy Arena. On March 14 of that year, he performed "Dirt on My Boots" on Late Night with Seth Meyers. Nine days later, Pardi performed it on Good Morning America. On May 25, 2017, Pardi was announced as being part of Luke Bryan's Farm Tour, opening in Lincoln, Nebraska on September 28 and ending in Centralia, Missouri on October 7, 2017. On August 2 of that year, Pardi partnered with CMT on Tour to headline his Lucky Tonight Tour with country music groups Midland and Runaway June, starting on October 12 in Birmingham, Alabama and finishing on December 8, 2017 in Grand Rapids, Michigan. On September 28, 2017, he was named as one of the opening acts for Miranda Lambert's Livin' Like Hippies Tour, beginning on January 18, 2018 at Greenville's Bon Secours Wellness Arena. On January 23, 2018, Pardi opened for Bryan again on the second leg of his What Makes You Country Tour, beginning on May 5 at Austin's iHeartRadio Country Festival and ending on October 26, 2018 in Detroit's Ford Field. On March 8 of that year, Pardi performed a medley of "She Ain't in It" and "Heartache on the Dance Floor" on Jimmy Kimmel Live!.

== Reception ==
Professional ratings
Review scores
Source	Rating
AllMusic	3.5/5 stars
One Country	4/5

California Sunrise was met with positive reviews from music critics. Jason Scott of One Country praised Pardi for crafting "hefty lyricism with inescapable guitar solos and robust melodies" on the album that capture the traditional stylings of Garth Brooks and Randy Travis, concluding by writing: "Pardi lets the music [and] the instruments and his voice live together, unfettered. He tells heartfelt stories, and [he] does it well. You can't get much better than that." AllMusic's Stephen Thomas Erlewine noted how the album has "space for softer tones and slower tempos," which allow for "experimentation with rhythms," and that Pardi's everyman image can hold him back sometimes, but concluded that "this workingman's diligence is a key element in turning California Sunrise into a frills-free, sturdily crafted collection." Jeffrey B. Remz of Country Standard Time also gave note of the traditional instrumentation and image present throughout the album, concluding that: "Maybe from Pardi's perch on the music scene, what was old may be new again. Maybe, just maybe, Pardi and his hat are indeed "something new" these days. And while being called a hat act was a pejorative once upon a time, Pardi and his ilk ought to proudly wear that moniker - as long as he remembers what the hat once stood for."

Rolling Stone ranked California Sunrise number 10 on their list of the 40 Best Country Albums of 2016. The magazine's writer Jon Freeman said the album is "compelling proof that traditionalism doesn't have to sound old fashioned," noting the mixture of fiddle and steel guitar with an "electrified Bakersfield twang" through modern production, concluding that: "[W]here many of his traditionalist peers looked backward for studied versions of the past, Jon Pardi kept his eyes firmly trained on the present." Uproxx ranked it number 17 on their list of the 20 Best Country Albums of 2016. The website's writer Caitlin White said that Pardi knows how to write traditional country narratives that don't sound like retreads and feel like a "fabulous break from crossover pop influences." She concluded by calling the album "an excellent sophomore effort from a star-in-the-making, keep an eye on this one, he's about ready for the arena circuit." In 2017, Billboard contributor Chuck Dauphin placed six tracks from California Sunrise on his top 10 list of Pardi's best songs: "She Ain't in It" at number one, "Head Over Boots" at number two, "Dirt on My Boots" at number three, "Paycheck" at number five, "Can't Turn You Down" at number eight, and "Heartache on the Dance Floor" at number 10. In 2018, it was nominated for Album of the Year at the 53rd Academy of Country Music Awards, ultimately losing to From A Room: Volume 1 (2017) by Chris Stapleton.

California Sunrise debuted at number 11 on the US Billboard 200 and atop the Top Country Albums chart, with first-week sales of 29,000 album-equivalent units, 24,000 of which were pure sales. It became Pardi's first number one album on the latter chart. On the Billboard 200, the album left the top 100 on the week of September 10, 2016, and has spent 217 weeks on the chart. California Sunrise was certified triple platinum by the RIAA in the US on October 31, 2025. It has sold 279,100 copies in the country as of November 2019, and has sold 1,076,000 album-equivalent units by March 2020. In Canada, the album debuted at number 93 on the Canadian Albums chart for the week of July 8, 2016. It later peaked at number 51 on the week of February 25, 2017, and stayed on the chart for a total of 21 weeks. California Sunrise was certified double platinum by Music Canada in Canada on February 26, 2025.

== Track listing ==
California Sunrise track listing
No.	Title	Writer(s)	Length
1.	"Out of Style"	Lynn Hutton; Jeff Hyde; Neil Mason	5:05
2.	"Cowboy Hat"	Jon Pardi; Brett Beavers; Bart Butler	3:18
3.	"Head Over Boots"	Pardi; Luke Laird	3:23
4.	"Night Shift"	Tofer Brown; Phillip LaRue; Billy Montana	2:52
5.	"Can’t Turn You Down"	Randy Montana; Corey Crowder; Jeremy Stover	3:24
6.	"Dirt on My Boots"	Rhett Akins; Jesse Frasure; Ashley Gorley	3:23
7.	"She Ain't in It"	Clint Daniels; Wynn Varble	3:18
8.	"All Time High"	Pardi; Butler; Brice Long	3:53
9.	"Heartache on the Dance Floor"	Pardi; Butler; Long	3:25
10.	"Paycheck"	Pardi; Laird	3:08
11.	"Lucky Tonight"	Pardi; Jim McCormick	3:28
12.	"California Sunrise"	Pardi; Butler; Larry McCoy	4:14
Total length:			42:51

10th Anniversary Edition
No.	Title	Writer(s)	Length
13.	"Drinkin' and Dancin'"		3:20
14.	"How Did You Know"	Akins; Butler; Pardi	3:16
15.	"If I Had Another Heart"		4:05
Total length:			53:32

== Personnel ==
Credits adapted from the album's liner notes.

Vocals

- Bart Butler – gang vocals
- Jon Pardi – lead vocals, background vocals, gang vocals
- Russell Terrell – background vocals, gang vocals

Production

- Bart Butler – producer
- Ryan Gore – recording, mixing
- Andrew Mendelson – mastering
- Jon Pardi – producer
- Jarod Snowden – digital editing
- Brad Winters – digital editing

Instruments

- Dave Cohen – Hammond B-3 organ, Wurlitzer electric piano
- Kris Donegan – electric guitar
- Jenee Fleenor – fiddle
- Lee Francis – bass guitar
- Ryan Gore – percussion, programming
- Mike Johnson – steel guitar
- Luke Laird – programming
- Rob McNelley – electric guitar, baritone guitar, slide guitar
- Miles McPherson – drums, percussion, programming
- Jon Pardi – percussion, programming
- Danny Rader – acoustic guitar, electric guitar, banjo, bouzouki, mandolin

== Charts ==
=== Weekly charts ===
Weekly chart performance for California Sunrise
Chart (2016–17)	Peak position
Canadian Albums (Billboard)	51
US Billboard 200	11
US Top Country Albums (Billboard)	1

=== Year-end charts ===
Year-end chart performance for California Sunrise in 2016
Chart (2016)	Position
US Billboard 200	197
US Top Country Albums (Billboard)	34

Year-end chart performance for California Sunrise in 2017
Chart (2017)	Position
US Billboard 200	72
US Top Country Albums (Billboard)	10

Year-end chart performance for California Sunrise in 2018
Chart (2018)	Position
US Billboard 200	99
US Top Country Albums (Billboard)	11

Year-end chart performance for California Sunrise in 2019
Chart (2019)	Position
US Billboard 200	146
US Top Country Albums (Billboard)	14

Year-end chart performance for California Sunrise in 2020
Chart (2020)	Position
US Top Country Albums (Billboard)	22

Year-end chart performance for California Sunrise in 2021
Chart (2021)	Position
US Top Country Albums (Billboard)	29

Year-end chart performance for California Sunrise in 2022
Chart (2022)	Position
US Top Country Albums (Billboard)	29

Year-end chart performance for California Sunrise in 2023
Chart (2023)	Position
US Top Country Albums (Billboard)	29

Year-end chart performance for California Sunrise in 2024
Chart (2024)	Position
US Top Country Albums (Billboard)	36

Year-end chart performance for California Sunrise in 2025
Chart (2025)	Position
US Top Country Albums (Billboard)	40

=== Decade-end charts ===
Decade-end chart performance for California Sunrise
Chart (2010–2019)	Position
US Top Country Albums (Billboard)	35

== Certifications ==
Certifications and sales for California Sunrise
Region	Certification	Certified units/sales
Canada (Music Canada)	2× Platinum	160,000^{‡}
New Zealand (RMNZ)	Gold	7,500^{‡}
United States (RIAA)	3× Platinum	3,000,000 / 279,100
^{‡} Sales+streaming figures based on certification alone.

== Release history ==
Release dates and formats for California Sunrise
Region	Date	Format(s)	Label	Ref.
United States	June 17, 2016	CD; digital download	Capitol Nashville	
