= Up All Night (Jon Pardi song) =

Single by Jon Pardi

from the album Write You a Song
- Released: March 11, 2013
- Recorded: 2013
- Genre: Country
- Length: 3:32
- Label: Capitol Nashville
- Songwriters: Jon Pardi; Bart Butler; Brett Beavers
- Producers: Bart Butler; Jon Pardi

Jon Pardi singles chronology
"Missin' You Crazy" (2012)	"Up All Night" (2013)	"What I Can't Put Down" (2014)

Up All Night is a song by American country music artist Jon Pardi. It was released in March 2013 as the second single from his debut studio album Write You a Song. The song was written by Pardi, Bart Butler and Brett Beavers.

Upon release, the song garnered a positive reviews from critics, particularly praising Pardi's vocal performance. Commercially, Up All Night peaked at numbers 10 and 11 on both the Billboard Hot Country Songs and Country Airplay charts respectively. It also gave Pardi his first appearance on the Hot 100, charting at number 56. The song was certified double Platinum by the Recording Industry Association of America (RIAA), with sales reaching 539,000 units in the United states as of June 2014. The song also charted in Canada, peaking at number 46 on the Canada Country chart.

The official music video for the song, directed by The Edde Brothers, was shot outside Nashville near Montgomery Bell State Park.

== Critical reception ==
Billy Dukes of Taste of Country gave the song three stars out of five, writing that "Pardi’s unique vocal delivery [is] the most distinguishing element" and "the chorus is catchy and well-written, but it stops short of becoming a moment to repeat again and again." Ashley Cooke of Roughstock gave the song three and a half stars out of five, saying that "it's a catchy tune that’s sure to have you bobbing your head" and "Pardi blends a traditional country sound with an up-tempo beat."

== Music video ==
The music video was directed by The Edde Brothers and filmed outside Nashville near Montgomery Bell State Park. It premiered in July 2013.

== Commercial performance ==
"Up All Night" debuted at No. 52 on the U.S. Billboard Country Airplay chart for the week of April 6, 2013. It also debuted at No. 46 on the U.S. Billboard Hot Country Songs chart for the week of April 20, 2013, and peaked at No. 10 on the Hot Country Songs. It debuted at No. 99 on the U.S. Billboard Hot 100 chart for the week of November 30, 2013, and reach a peak at No. 56 on this chart for the chart dated February 1, 2014.

The song was certified Gold on March 13, 2014. The song has sold 539,000 copies in the US as of June 2014.

== Charts ==
=== Weekly charts ===
Chart (2013–2014)	Peak position
Canada Country (Billboard)	46
US Billboard Hot 100	56
US Country Airplay (Billboard)	11
US Hot Country Songs (Billboard)	10

=== Year-end charts ===
Chart (2013)	Position
US Country Airplay (Billboard)	81
US Hot Country Songs (Billboard)	93

Chart (2014)	Position
US Country Airplay (Billboard)	74
US Hot Country Songs (Billboard)	78

== Certifications ==
Region	Certification	Certified units/sales
Canada (Music Canada)	Platinum	80,000^{‡}
United States (RIAA)	2× Platinum	2,000,000^{‡}
^{‡} Sales+streaming figures based on certification alone.
