= Heartache on the Dance Floor =

Single by Jon Pardi

from the album California Sunrise
- Released: May 1, 2017
- Recorded: 2016
- Genre: Country
- Length: 3:25
- Label: Capitol Nashville
- Songwriters: Jon Pardi; Bart Butler; Brice Long
- Producers: Bart Butler; Jon Pardi

Jon Pardi singles chronology
"Dirt on My Boots" (2016)	"Heartache on the Dance Floor" (2017)	"She Ain't in It" (2017)

"Heartache on the Dance Floor" is a song co-written and recorded by American country music artist Jon Pardi. It was released to radio on May 1, 2017, as the third single from his second studio album California Sunrise (2016). The song was written by Pardi, Bart Butler and Brice Long. "Heartache on the Dance Floor" peaked at numbers three and five on both the Billboard Country Airplay and Hot Country Songs charts respectively. It also reached number 47 on the Hot 100 chart. It was certified 4× Platinum by the Recording Industry Association of America (RIAA), denoting sales of over three million units in the country. The song garnered similar success in Canada, giving Pardi his second number-one hit on the Country chart and peaking at number 86 on the Canadian Hot 100 chart. The accompanying music video for the single, directed by Carlos Ruiz, features Pardi having a dream of spending a romantic date with a woman at night.

== Commercial performance ==
"Heartache on the Dance Floor" first entered the Country Airplay chart dated May 13, 2017 at number 49, and Hot Country Songs chart at number 47 two weeks later. It has sold 240,000 copies in the United States as of November 2017. On the week of July 22, it debuted at number 89 on the Billboard Hot 100. Eleven weeks later, it peaked at number 47 and stayed on the chart for eighteen weeks. The song was certified triple platinum by the Recording Industry Association of America (RIAA) on July 15, 2022. In Canada, the track debuted at number 100 on the Canadian Hot 100 the week of August 12, peaking at number 86 on the week of September 2. It reappeared at number 99 the week of October 14 and stayed on the chart for nine weeks.

== Music video ==
The music video for the single was directed by Carlos Ruiz and was filmed on Venice Beach. It tells the story of Pardi having a nap on a Californian beach Pacific Ocean, and dreamed of meeting a woman at a seaside dance and spending a romantic night with her.

== Live performance ==
On March 8, 2018, Pardi performed the song live as a medley with "She Ain't In It" on Jimmy Kimmel Live!.

== Charts ==
=== Weekly charts ===
Chart (2017)	Peak position
Canada Country (Billboard)	1
Canada (Canadian Hot 100)	86
US Billboard Hot 100	47
US Country Airplay (Billboard)	3
US Hot Country Songs (Billboard)	5

=== Year-end charts ===
Chart (2017)	Position
Canada Country (Billboard)	4
US Country Airplay (Billboard)	39
US Hot Country Songs (Billboard)	16

== Certifications ==
Region	Certification	Certified units/sales
Canada (Music Canada)	4× Platinum	320,000^{‡}
New Zealand (RMNZ)	Gold	15,000^{‡}
United States (RIAA)	4× Platinum	4,000,000^{‡}
^{‡} Sales+streaming figures based on certification alone.
