= She Ain't in It =

Single by Jon Pardi

from the album California Sunrise
- Released: October 23, 2017
- Genre: Country
- Length: 3:19
- Label: Capitol Nashville
- Songwriters: Clint Daniels; Wynn Varble
- Producers: Jon Pardi; Bart Butler

Jon Pardi singles chronology
"Heartache on the Dance Floor" (2017)	"She Ain't in It" (2017)	"Night Shift" (2018)

"She Ain't in It" is a song written by Clint Daniels and Wynn Varble, and recorded by American country music artist Jon Pardi. It is the fourth single from his second album California Sunrise (2016). The song, telling of a brokenhearted man, was accompanied by a music video directed by Jim Wright. It is Pardi's eighth charted single, reaching numbers 21 and 23 on both the Billboard Country Airplay and Hot Country Songs charts respectively. It was certified Platinum by the Recording Industry Association of America (RIAA), denoting sales of over 1,000,000 units in the United States. The song also charted in Canada, peaking at number 31 on the Canada Country chart.

== Content ==
An uncredited review in Taste of Country described the song as "a slow, fiddle and steel powered love-lost song that finds the typically plucky 31-year-old hurting." It is about a man who is "ready to start getting back into the swing of things, but still hurting from a breakup that he hasn't gotten over." The song was originally on hold for George Strait, but once it became available to Pardi, he chose to record it.

== Music video ==
The music video, directed by Jim Wright, was filmed in black-and-white. It features the male narrator working on a ranch, interspersed with shots of the man's former lover who has moved to New York City.

== Live performance ==
On March 8, 2018, Pardi first performed the song live as a medley with "Heartache on the Dance Floor" on Jimmy Kimmel Live!.

== Chart performance ==
=== Weekly charts ===
Chart (2017–2018)	Peak position
Canada Country (Billboard)	31
US Bubbling Under Hot 100 (Billboard)	24
US Country Airplay (Billboard)	21
US Hot Country Songs (Billboard)	23

=== Year-end charts ===
Chart (2018)	Position
US Hot Country Songs (Billboard)	76

== Certifications ==
Region	Certification	Certified units/sales
Canada (Music Canada)	Gold	40,000^{‡}
United States (RIAA)	Platinum	1,000,000^{‡}
^{‡} Sales+streaming figures based on certification alone.
