= Missin' You Crazy =

Single by Jon Pardi

from the album Write You a Song
- Released: March 26, 2012
- Recorded: 2012
- Genre: Country
- Length: 3:21
- Label: Capitol Nashville
- Songwriters: Jon Pardi; Bart Butler; Monty Holmes
- Producers: Bart Butler; Jon Pardi

Jon Pardi singles chronology
"Missin' You Crazy" (2012)	"Up All Night" (2013)

"Missin' You Crazy" is a song recorded by American country music artist Jon Pardi. It was released in March 2012 as Pardi's first single. It is included on his album Write You a Song, which was released on January 14, 2014. The song was written by Pardi, Bart Butler and Monty Holmes. The song garnered mixed reviews from critics. "Missin' You Crazy" reached numbers 25 and 29 on both the Billboard Country Airplay and Hot Country Songs charts respectively. The accompanying music video for the song was directed by The Edde Brothers.

== Critical reception ==
Billy Dukes of Taste of Country gave the song three stars out of five, writing that "this song fails to leave its stamp on one’s emotions. Nothing lingers, and there’s no sense of urgency to hear it again." Matt Bjorke of Roughstock gave the song a favorable review, saying that "the vocals are strongly country and the production allows room for fiddle and steel guitars to be more than just background flavor."

== Music video ==
The music video was directed by The Edde Brothers and premiered in July 2012.

== Chart performance ==
"Missin' You Crazy" debuted at number 58 on the U.S. Billboard Hot Country Songs chart for the week of April 14, 2012.

Chart (2012)	Peak position
US Country Airplay (Billboard)	25
US Hot Country Songs (Billboard)	29

=== Year-end charts ===
Chart (2012)	Position
US Country Songs (Billboard)	84
