= Honkytonk Hollywood =

Studio album by Jon Pardi
- Released: April 11, 2025
- Genre: Country
- Length: 59:23
- Label: Capitol Nashville
- Producer: Jay Joyce

Jon Pardi chronology
| Merry Christmas from Jon Pardi (2023) | Honkytonk Hollywood (2025) |

Singles from Honkytonk Hollywood
- 1. "Friday Night Heartbreaker" Released: September 6, 2024; 2. "Boots Off" Released: January 20, 2026

Honkytonk Hollywood is the sixth studio album by American neotraditional country artist Jon Pardi. The album was released on April 11, 2025, via Capitol Nashville. It is Pardi's first album to be produced by Jay Joyce.

== Background ==
Honkytonk Hollywood was initially announced in September 2024 with the release of the album's lead single "Friday Night Heartbreaker". In December 2024, Pardi announced his Honkytonk Hollywood tour to promote his upcoming album. The tour will span 16 shows across 13 states/territories across the United States and Canada. On January 17, 2025, he officially announced the album with a release date of April 11, 2025. The album's title track was released as a promotional single alongside the announcement. It is Pardi's first album with producer Jay Joyce after co-producing his previous albums with Bart Butler and Ryan Gore.

Pardi describes the album as the "most grown-up record [he's] ever made".

== Reception ==
Honkytonk Hollywood was met with mixed to positive reviews from music critics. Entertainment Focus called it his most "adventurous album yet", blending his honky-tonk roots with Southern rock, 80s anthems, and California country influences to showcase a bold evolution in his sound. Get Ready to Rock called it ambitious and original within a narrow genre, and one of the year's better country albums.

Honkytonk Hollywood debuted at number 145 on the US Billboard 200 and number 27 on Top Country Albums chart, the lowest sales week in his career.

== Track listing ==
| No. | Title | Writer(s) | Length |
|---|---|---|---|
| 1. | "Boots Off" | Jon Pardi; Luke Laird; Wyatt McCubbin | 2:41 |
| 2. | "Friday Night Heartbreaker" | Jessie Jo Dillon; Ryan Hurd; Josh Miller; Daniel Ross; Chris Tompkins | 3:25 |
| 3. | "She Gets to Drinking" | Pardi; Hillary Lindsey; Hailey Whitters | 4:15 |
| 4. | "Gamblin' Man" | Josh Kear; Miller; Tompkins | 2:49 |
| 5. | "Hey California" | Ben Johnson; Jordan Minton; Hunter Phelps; John Prentice | 3:52 |
| 6. | "Rush" | Pardi; Brice Long; Ross Copperman | 4:03 |
| 7. | "She Drives Away" | Zach Abend; Jimi Bell; Seth Ennis; Minton | 3:09 |
| 8. | "He Went to Work" | Dan Alley; Brandon Kinney; Neil Medley | 3:04 |
| 9. | "Last Call Thing" | Pardi; Casey Brown; Laird; Travis Wood | 2:44 |
| 10. | "Honkytonk Hollywood" | Bart Butler; Benjy Davis; Jacob Rice | 3:28 |
| 11. | "Love the Lights Out" | Pardi; Bell; Matt Dragstrem | 3:18 |
| 12. | "Nice Place to Visit" | Pryor Baird; Billy Lawson; James LeBlanc | 3:18 |
| 13. | "Hard Knocks" | Jackson Dean; Jeff Hyde; Ryan Tyndell | 3:04 |
| 14. | "Don't You Wanna Know" | Pardi; Laird; Lindsey | 3:47 |
| 15. | "Bar Room Blue" | Pardi; Laird; Josh Thompson | 3:23 |
| 16. | "Who I Don't Wanna Be" | Pardi; Rhett Akins; Will Bundy | 3:19 |
| 17. | "Kinda Wanna Keep it That Way" | Marv Green; Hyde; Long | 2:52 |
| Total length: | | | 59:23 |

== Personnel ==
- Jon Pardi – vocals (all tracks), acoustic guitar (tracks 2, 3, 5, 8–10, 12, 15, 16), electric guitar (5)
- Jay Joyce – production, mixing (all tracks); synthesizer (tracks 1, 2, 4–6, 8–17), programming (1, 2, 4, 6, 9, 11, 14, 16, 17), acoustic guitar (2, 4, 5, 17), electric guitar (2, 3, 7–9, 11), Hammond B3 (3, 9, 12, 15, 16), percussion (6, 10, 11, 16), tambourine (7), keyboards (12, 15, 16)
- Kevin Murphy – drums (all tracks), bongos (17)
- Rob McNelley – electric guitar
- Terry Palmer – electric guitar (tracks 1–6, 8–16), background vocals (1, 2, 4–6, 8, 10–12, 15, 17)
- Lee Francis – bass (tracks 1–6, 8–16), upright bass (7, 17)
- Derek Bahr – electric guitar (tracks 1–6, 8–11, 15, 16), background vocals (4–6, 9, 10, 15, 17), acoustic guitar (7, 13), banjo (14)
- Jeff Hyde – acoustic guitar (tracks 1, 3–5, 7, 8, 10–17), banjo (9), background vocals (13)
- Matt Heasley – keyboards (tracks 1, 2, 7), piano (1, 3, 4, 12, 13, 15), Hammond B3 (1, 6, 8–11, 13, 14, 16), Rhodes (3, 5, 11), synthesizer (4, 9, 14, 16), Mellotron (4), Wurlitzer electric piano (10–12, 17)
- Billy McClaran – mandolin (tracks 1, 11), fiddle (2–17), background vocals (4–7, 8, 11, 13–15)
- Alex Cordell – steel guitar (tracks 2–4, 6–17)
- Hailey Whitters – background vocals (track 3)
- Hillary Lindsey – background vocals (track 3)
- Sarah Buxton – background vocals (track 12)
- Ryan Tyndell – electric guitar (track 13)
- Andrew Mendelson – mastering
- Jason Hall – mixing, engineering
- Bobby Louden – recording, engineering assistance
- Jimmy Mansfield – recording, engineering assistance
- Court Blankenship – production coordination

== Charts ==
Chart performance for Honkytonk Hollywood
| Chart (2025) | Peak position |
|---|---|
| UK Album Downloads (Official Charts) | 71 |
| US Billboard 200 | 145 |
| US Top Country Albums (Billboard) | 27 |
