= Mr. Saturday Night (album) =

Studio album by Jon Pardi
- Released: September 2, 2022
- Studios: East Iris (Nashville); Sound Stage (Nashville); Shrimpboat (Key West); Maverick (Nashville); Blackbird (Nashville); The Zone (Dripping Springs)
- Genre: Neotraditional country
- Length: 44:43
- Label: Capitol Nashville
- Producers: Bart Butler; Ryan Gore; Dann Huff; Shane McAnally; Josh Osborne; Jon Pardi

Jon Pardi chronology
Heartache Medication (2019)	Mr. Saturday Night (2022)	Merry Christmas from Jon Pardi (2023)

Singles from Mr. Saturday Night
- 1. "Last Night Lonely" Released: February 21, 2022; 2. "Your Heart or Mine" Released: October 3, 2022

Mr. Saturday Night is the fourth studio album by American neotraditional country artist Jon Pardi. The album was released on September 2, 2022, via Capitol Nashville. Pardi co-produced the album with Bart Butler and Ryan Gore, who he worked with on his previous release Heartache Medication in 2019.

== Background ==
Mr. Saturday Night was announced in February 2022 alongside the release of its lead single "Last Night Lonely". When talking about the album with Billboard, Pardi said "These are songs that I've had on hold for two years, that have been part of this project for a long time. They stuck around and carved their names into this album and it wouldn't sound the same without them. Everything fits, from the ones I've written, the ones I've recorded, they're all based around me and in the long run, a lot of these songwriters know the sounds that I gravitate toward."

The album's official track listing was revealed on July 23, 2022, along with the release of "Mr. Saturday Night" as a promotional single. Of the album's title track, Pardi stated "I feel like everybody wants to be Mr. Saturday Night at one point on the weekend and have a good time. But then you hear the song and – the way it's so well written – it's a sad song, but you don't go there right away, because it's also a fun song. That's the thing about 'Mr. Saturday Night', it's more than meets the eye. It's all fun until you get to the chorus."

The album's second single, "Longneck Way To Go" was released to radio on July 18, 2022. A collaboration with Midland, who co-wrote the song with Rhett Akins and Ashley Gorley, the song was also featured on their album The Last Resort: Greeting From which was released on May 6, 2022.

A week before the album's release, Pardi stated in an interview that the deluxe version, planned for a 2023 release, would feature a collaboration with Luke Bryan. Of the song, Pardi explained "I'm pretty excited about it. It's a very country song. It's one of my favorites, and it was meant for me and Luke to sing. It's not about a girl, but it's about hard work. I think it's gonna be a big song."

In an interview with Taste Of Country, Pardi explained that his decision to only co-write five of the album's fourteen songs was due to his belief that the "best song wins", noting that "I could have wrote the whole record. Would it have been as good? No."

== Track listing ==
No.	Title	Writer(s)	Length
1.	"Mr. Saturday Night"	Benjy Davis; Reid Isbell; Joe Ragosta	3:06
2.	"Fill 'Er Up"	Jon Pardi; Ross Copperman; Brice Long	2:48
3.	"Last Night Lonely"	Jimi Bell; Joe Fox; Dylan Marlowe	3:02
4.	"Neon Light Speed"	Andy Albert; Josh Dorr; Paul DiGiovanni	3:07
5.	"New Place to Drink"	Pardi; Jessie Jo Dillon; Luke Laird	3:53
6.	"Your Heart or Mine"	Bart Butler; Justin Ebach; John Pierce	2:41
7.	"Santa Cruz"	Pardi; Laird	3:16
8.	"Longneck Way to Go" (featuring Midland)	Rhett Akins; Jess Carson; Cameron Duddy; Ashley Gorley; Mark Wystrach	3:08
9.	"Raincheck"	Will Bundy; John Edwards; Michael Tyler	3:32
10.	"Workin' on a New One"	Pardi; Akins; Laird	2:50
11.	"Hung the Moon"	Bundy; John Morgan; Jameson Rodgers	3:37
12.	"The Day I Stop Dancin'"	Butler; Ebach; Josh Thompson	3:16
13.	"Smokin' a Doobie"	Pardi; Akins; Laird	2:55
14.	"Reverse Cowgirl"	Fox; Zack Dyer; Jared Scott	3:26
Total length:			44:43

== Personnel ==
=== Musicians ===
- Jon Pardi – vocals, background vocals
- Miles McPherson – drums, percussion, programming
- Sarah Buxton – background vocals
- Lee Francis – bass guitar
- Danny Rader – acoustic guitar
- Jenee Fleenor – fiddle
- Rob McNelley – electric guitar
- Brent Mason – electric guitar
- Scotty Sanders – pedal steel
- Mike Johnson – pedal steel
- Jeff Roach – Hammond B3, piano
- Ryan Gore – programming
- Luke Laird – programming
- Justin Ebach – programming
- Dave Cohen – accordion, Hammond B3, piano, synthesizer, Wurlitzer
- Brice Long – background vocals
- Trey Keller – background vocals
- Sarah Buxton – background vocals
- Greg Morrow – drums, tambourine (track 8)
- Cameron Duddy – bass guitar, background vocals (track 8)
- Ilya Toshinsky – acoustic guitar, banjo (track 8)
- Jess Carson – acoustic guitar, background vocals (track 8)
- Sol Philcox-Littlefield – electric guitar (track 8)
- Dann Huff – electric guitar (track 8)
- Paul Franklin – steel guitar (track 8)
- Robbie Crowell – Hammond B3 (track 8)
- David Huff – programming (track 8)
- Justin Niebank – programming (track 8)
- Charlie Judge – piano (track 8)
- Mark Wystrach – vocals (track 8)

=== Technical ===
- Ryan Gore – production (all tracks); mixing, recording (tracks 1–7, 9–14), Jon Pardi vocal recording (8)
- Bart Butler – production
- Jon Pardi – production (tracks 1–7, 9–14)
- Shane McAnally – production (track 8)
- Josh Osborne – production (track 8)
- Ted Jensen – mastering (tracks 1–7, 9–14)
- Adam Ayan – mastering (track 8)
- Justin Niebank – mixing (track 8)
- Steve Marcantonio – recording (track 8)
- Chris Small – digital editing
- David Huff – digital editing (track 8)
- Michael Walter – additional recording (track 8)
- Pat Manske – additional recording (track 8)
- Drew Bollman – additional mix engineering (track 8)
- Joel McKenney – recording assistance (tracks 1–7, 9–14)
- Rick Humes – recording assistance (tracks 1–7, 9–14)
- Michael Walter – recording assistance (track 8)
- Scott Johnson – production management (tracks 1–7, 9–14)
- Mike "Frog" Griffith – production management (track 8)

== Charts ==
Chart performance for Mr. Saturday Night
Chart (2022)	Peak position
Canadian Albums (Billboard)	58
US Billboard 200	33
US Top Country Albums (Billboard)	5

== Certifications ==
Certifications for Mr. Saturday Night
Region	Certification	Certified units/sales
United States (RIAA)	Gold	500,000^{‡}
^{‡} Sales+streaming figures based on certification alone.
