= What I Can't Put Down =

Single by Jon Pardi

from the album Write You a Song
- Released: January 14, 2014
- Recorded: 2013
- Genre: Country
- Length: 3:23
- Label: Capitol Nashville
- Songwriters: Jon Pardi; Bart Butler; Brice Long
- Producers: Bart Butler; Jon Pardi

Jon Pardi singles chronology
| "Up All Night" (2013) | "What I Can't Put Down" (2014) | "When I've Been Drinkin'" (2014) |

"What I Can't Put Down" is a song by American country music artist Jon Pardi. It was released on January 14, 2014, as the third single from Pardi's debut studio album Write You a Song (2014). The song was written by Pardi, Bart Butler, and Brice Long. It garnered positive reviews from music critics. "What I Can't Put Down" peaked at numbers 31 and 33 on both the Billboard Country Airplay and Hot Country Songs charts respectively. The song was certified Gold by the Recording Industry Association of America (RIAA), denoting sales of over 500,000 units in the United States. An accompanying music video for the single, directed by the Edde Brothers, was released in June 2014.

== Critical reception ==
"What I Can't Put Down" received positive reviews from critics. Billy Dukes of Taste of Country wrote that "'What I Can't Put Down' is the signature track from Jon Pardi's 'Write You a Song' album. More than any other, this country-rocker defines the music he introduces on one of 2014's finest releases to date." Vickye Fisher of For The Country Record remarked "Channelling a head-bobbing, rock 'n' roll sound that slots into the kind of country we were used to hearing on the radio just a few years ago, this fairly catchy song will be a great one for the festivals of the summer. It utilizes the cute hook of "I'm always picking up what I can't put down", running through cheerful and non-threatening examples of vices, such as cigarettes, alcohol, music and love, perhaps a girl in particular." In 2017, Billboard contributor Chuck Dauphin put "What I Can't Put Down" at number six on his top 10 list of Pardi's best songs.

== Music video ==
The music video was directed by The Edde Brothers and premiered in June 2014.

== Chart performance ==
| Chart (2014) | Peak position |
|---|---|
| US Country Airplay (Billboard) | 31 |
| US Hot Country Songs (Billboard) | 33 |

== Certifications ==
| Region | Certification | Certified units/sales |
|---|---|---|
| United States (RIAA) | Gold | 500,000^{‡} |
^{‡} Sales+streaming figures based on certification alone.
