= Heartache Medication =

Studio album by Jon Pardi
- Released: September 27, 2019
- Studio: Back Stage Studio (Nashville); Sound Stage Studios (Nashville); Blackbird Studios (Nashville); Shelly's Honky Tonk and Maverick Recording (Nashville); Southern Ground (Nashville); The Creative Nation Attic (Nashville)
- Genre: Neotraditional country
- Length: 49:53
- Label: Capitol Nashville
- Producer: Bart Butler; Ryan Gore; Jon Pardi

Jon Pardi chronology
California Sunrise (2016)	Heartache Medication (2019)	Mr. Saturday Night (2022)

Singles from Heartache Medication
- 1. "Heartache Medication" Released: May 20, 2019; 2. "Ain't Always the Cowboy" Released: March 16, 2020; 3. "Tequila Little Time" Released: January 18, 2021

Heartache Medication is the third studio album by American neotraditional country artist Jon Pardi. The album was released on September 27, 2019, via Capitol Nashville. Following the success of 2016's California Sunrise, Pardi reteamed with co-producer Bart Butler and brought in Ryan Gore to work on new material for his next country album, carrying traditional content that evoked sad emotions but gave the listener good vibes at the same time. Heartache Medication debuted at numbers two and 11 on the Top Country Albums and Billboard 200 charts, respectively. It has spawned three singles: the title track (his third number-one country hit) and "Ain't Always the Cowboy". and "Tequila Little Time" A deluxe version was released on October 2, 2020.

== Background ==
In late 2018 after wrapping up a summer tour with Luke Bryan, Pardi had announced he was taking his time on releasing new music but to expect new music from him in the new year. At the time he hinted at a song written by and hopefully featuring fellow country star Miranda Lambert.

One day after appearing on the 2019 season finale of American Idol, Pardi announced the album. Its lead single, the title track, was released May 20, 2019. Three additional tracks were also previewed ahead of the album's release—"Ain't Always the Cowboy", "Me and Jack", and "Tequila Little Time".

Before the album's release, Pardi stated he named the album Heartache Medication because it contains sad topics intended to make the listener feel good at the same time.

== Critical reception ==
Professional ratings
Review scores
Source	Rating
AllMusic	4/5 stars

AllMusic's Stephen Thomas Erlewine praised Pardi for using the formula from California Sunrise to craft a track listing filled with odes and nods to traditional country and doesn't give in to the "sentimental streak or his own musical conservatism", concluding that "All of these songs show that Pardi's traditionalism is flexible, and those subtle grace notes help make Heartache Medication the best old-fashioned mainstream country album of 2019."

== Commercial performance ==
Heartache Medication debuted on the Billboard 200 at number 11, and number two on the Top Country Albums chart with 34,000 units, 23,000 of which are in pure album sales. On the Billboard 200, it left the top 100 on the week of November 2, 2019, spending eleven weeks on the chart. The album has sold 52,500 copies in the United States as of March 2020, and 161,000 units in total as of February 2020. In Canada, it debuted and peaked at number 18 on the Canadian Albums chart for the week of October 11.

== Track listing ==
No.	Title	Writer(s)	Length
1.	"Old Hat"	Jeff Hyde; Matt Jenkins; Ryan Tyndell	3:14
2.	"Heartache Medication"	Jon Pardi; Barry Dean; Natalie Hemby	3:29
3.	"Nobody Leaves a Girl Like That"	Bart Butler; Marv Green; Jimmy Yeary	3:29
4.	"Ain't Always the Cowboy"	Brandon Kinney; Josh Thompson	3:40
5.	"Me and Jack"	Pardi; Rhett Akins; Butler; Luke Laird	4:51
6.	"Don't Blame It on Whiskey" (featuring Lauren Alaina)	Eric Church; Michael P. Heeney; Laird; Miranda Lambert	3:42
7.	"Tied One On"	Butler; Chase McGill; Jamie Paulin	3:05
8.	"Oughta Know That"	Pardi; Butler; Laird	3:49
9.	"Tequila Little Time"	Pardi; Akins; Laird	3:27
10.	"Buy That Man a Beer"	Clint Daniels; Justin Lantz; John Pierce	3:15
11.	"Call Me Country"	Pardi; Butler; Driver Williams	3:49
12.	"Just Like Old Times"	Pardi; Hyde; Heeney	3:31
13.	"Love Her Like She's Leaving"	Butler; Dean Dillon; Jessie Jo Dillon	3:11
14.	"Starlight"	Pardi; Butler; Jeffrey Steele	3:21
Total length:			49:53

Deluxe version (Digital release only)
No.	Title	Writer(s)	Length
15.	"Bar Downtown"	Thompson; Josh Osborne; Matt Dragstrem	3:23
16.	"Beer Light"	Pardi; Hyde; Brice Long	3:23
17.	"Ain't Always the Cowboy" (Western Version)	Kinney; Thompson	4:14
Total length:			60:53

== Personnel ==
Adapted from the album's liner notes.

Vocals

- Lauren Alaina – featured vocals (track 6)
- Jeff Hyde – background vocals (track 1)
- Jon Pardi – lead vocals (all tracks), background vocals (tracks 6, 8, 9, 17)
- Russell Terrell – background vocals (all tracks except 9 & 17)

Production

- Bart Butler – producer
- Dan Davis – assistant engineer
- Ryan Gore – producer, mixing
- Ted Jensen – mastering
- Scott Johnson – production assistance
- Kam Luchterhand – assistant engineer
- Seth Morton – assistant engineer
- Chris Small – digital editing

Instruments

- Dave Cohen – accordion (track 9), Fender Rhodes (track 1), Hammond B-3 organ (tracks 1, 3, 4, 6–8, 15), piano (tracks 2, 3, 7, 10, 13, 16, 17), strings (tracks 7, 13), synthesizer (tracks 16, 17), vibraphone (track 7), Wurlitzer (tracks 5, 6, 9, 15)
- Howard Duck – piano (track 12)
- Andy Ellison – pedal steel guitar (tracks 1, 5, 13)
- Jenee Fleenor – fiddle (all tracks except 8)
- Lee Francis – bass guitar (all tracks)
- Ryan Gore – percussion (tracks 1–6, 8–14), programming (tracks 9, 15, 16)
- Mike Haynes – trumpet (track 9)
- Mike Johnson – dobro (track 14), pedal steel guitar (tracks 2–4, 6–8, 10–12, 15, 16)
- Luke Laird – programming (tracks 8, 9), synthesizer (track 9)
- John Lancaster – Hammond B-3 organ (track 14), synthesizer (track 14), Wurlitzer (track 11)
- Rob McNelley – electric guitar (all tracks except 17)
- Miles McPherson – drums (all tracks), percussion (tracks 1, 2, 5, 7, 9, 10, 12, 15–17), timbales (track 9)
- Jon Pardi – electric guitar (track 8)
- Danny Rader – acoustic guitar (all tracks), banjo (track 14), mandolin (track 14)
- Derek Wells – electric guitar (track 17)

Imagery

- Jon Pardi – art direction
- Karen Naff – art direction and design
- Jim Wright – photography

== Charts ==
=== Weekly charts ===
Weekly chart performance for Heartache Medication
Chart (2019)	Peak position
Australian Digital Albums (ARIA)	17
Canadian Albums (Billboard)	18
US Billboard 200	11
US Top Country Albums (Billboard)	2

=== Year-end charts ===
Year-end chart performance for Heartache Medication in 2019
Chart (2019)	Position
US Top Country Albums (Billboard)	59

Year-end chart performance for Heartache Medication in 2020
Chart (2020)	Position
US Top Country Albums (Billboard)	29

Year-end chart performance for Heartache Medication in 2021
Chart (2021)	Position
US Top Country Albums (Billboard)	63

== Certifications ==
Certifications for Heartache Medication
Region	Certification	Certified units/sales
Canada (Music Canada)	Gold	40,000^{‡}
United States (RIAA)	Gold	500,000^{‡}
^{‡} Sales+streaming figures based on certification alone.
