= Dirt on My Boots =

Single by Jon Pardi

from the album California Sunrise
- Released: September 19, 2016
- Recorded: 2016
- Genre: Country
- Length: 3:23
- Label: Capitol Nashville
- Songwriters: Rhett Akins; Jesse Frasure; Ashley Gorley
- Producers: Bart Butler; Jon Pardi

Jon Pardi singles chronology
"Head Over Boots" (2015)	"Dirt on My Boots" (2016)	"Heartache on the Dance Floor" (2017)

"Dirt on My Boots" is a song recorded by American country music artist Jon Pardi. It was released to radio on September 19, 2016, as the second single to his second studio album California Sunrise. The song was written by Rhett Akins, Jesse Frasure and Ashley Gorley.

"Dirt on My Boots" is Pardi's second number-one single, following "Head Over Boots" in taking the top spot on the Country Airplay chart. It also peaked at numbers two and 37 on both the Hot Country Songs and Hot 100 charts respectively. The song was certified 7× Platinum by the Recording Industry Association of America (RIAA), and has sold 742,000 copies in the United States as of January 2018. It achieved similar success in Canada, reaching number one on the Country chart and number 58 on the Canadian Hot 100. The song garnered a Gold certification from Music Canada, denoting sales of 40,000 units in that country.

The music video for the single was shot entirely in black-and-white and features Pardi practicing for a show while his girlfriend watches him. It was nominated for Video of the Year at the 2017 CMT Music Awards. For promotion, Pardi first performed the song live on Late Night with Seth Meyers and would make later appearances on Good Morning America and the Country Music Association Awards.

== Background ==
The song was written by Rhett Akins, Jesse Frasure and Ashley Gorley, and it is one of the songs on the album that Pardi did not have a hand in writing. Pardi was interested in creating more modern-sounding tracks, and he described the demo of the song as "super-hip-hop". But as he liked the lyrics and thought the content of the song country, they decided to make the song more country.

== Critical reception ==
On October 1, 2017, Billboard contributor Chuck Dauphin put "Dirt on My Boots" at number three on his top 10 list of Pardi's best songs. On November 8, it was nominated for Single of the Year and Song of the Year at the 51st Annual Country Music Association Awards, but lost both awards to Keith Urban's "Blue Ain't Your Color" and Little Big Town's "Better Man" respectively. On March 11, 2018, it was nominated for Country Song of the Year at the 2018 iHeartRadio Music Awards, but it went to "Body Like a Back Road" by Sam Hunt.

== Commercial performance ==
"Dirt on My Boots" debuted at number 49 on the Billboard Country Airplay chart the week of October 8, 2016, after it was released to radio. It quickly gained traction on the chart, eventually reaching number one for the week of March 25, 2017, making it Pardi's second number-one on the Airplay chart. It also debuted at number 95 on Billboard Hot 100 the week of December 24, 2016. Fourteen weeks later, it peaked at number 37 the week of April 1, 2017, and remained on the chart for twenty weeks. The song was certified seven-times platinum by the Recording Industry Association of America (RIAA) on June 12, 2026. It has sold 742,000 copies in the United States as of February 2018.

In Canada, the song debuted at number 99 on the Canadian Hot 100 the week of December 10, 2016 and reached number 89 the next week. It peaked at number 58 the week of February 25, 2017 and stayed on the chart for twenty weeks. The track was certified gold by Music Canada on January 25, 2017.

== Music video ==
The music video for the song was released on February 23, 2017, and features Pardi performing on stage at a show. It is entirely in black-and-white. It shows Pardi preparing for the show, and with a girlfriend watching while he is performing, and the two then leave together after the song has finished. It was nominated for Video of the Year and Breakthrough Video of the Year at the 2017 CMT Music Awards, but lost both awards to Keith Urban's "Blue Ain't Your Color" and Lauren Alaina's "Road Less Traveled" respectively.

== Live performances ==
On March 14, 2017, Pardi first performed the song live on Late Night with Seth Meyers. Nine days later, he performed it on Good Morning America. On November 8, he performed the track at the 51st Annual Country Music Association Awards.

== Charts ==
=== Weekly charts ===
Chart (2016–2017)	Peak position
Canada Hot 100 (Billboard)	58
Canada Country (Billboard)	1
US Billboard Hot 100	37
US Country Airplay (Billboard)	1
US Hot Country Songs (Billboard)	2

=== Year-end charts ===
Chart (2017)	Position
Canada Country (Billboard)	3
US Country Airplay (Billboard)	4
US Hot Country Songs (Billboard)	6
US Radio Songs (Billboard)	68

=== Decade-end charts ===
Chart (2010–2019)	Position
US Hot Country Songs (Billboard)	18

== Certifications ==
Region	Certification	Certified units/sales
Canada (Music Canada)	6× Platinum	480,000^{‡}
New Zealand (RMNZ)	Platinum	30,000^{‡}
United States (RIAA)	7× Platinum	7,000,000^{‡} / 742,000
^{‡} Sales+streaming figures based on certification alone.
