= Jenee Fleenor =

American musician

- Born: Springdale, Arkansas, U.S.
- Genres: Bluegrass; Country; Neotraditional country
- Occupations: Musician; songwriter; singer
- Instruments: Vocals; Fiddle; Mandolin; Acoustic guitar
- Years active: 2001-present
- Website: https://www.jeneemusic.com/

Jenee Fleenor is an American musician. A singer-songwriter, she plays the fiddle, mandolin and acoustic guitar and has performed with various musicians and bands. In 2019, she became the first woman to be nominated and to win the Country Music Association's Musician of the Year and the first fiddle player to win the award in over 20 years. She has subsequently won the award a further four consecutive times. Fleenor is also a two-time winner of the Specialty Instruments Player of the Year award at the Academy of Country Music Awards. She received a Grammy Award nomination as a songwriter in 2026 for co-writing "A Song to Sing" with Chris Stapleton, Miranda Lambert, and Jesse Frasure.

Fleenor has performed with artists including George Strait, Jon Pardi, Blake Shelton, Steven Tyler, Terri Clark, Martina McBride, Cody Johnson, and Rascal Flatts. She has written songs for many of the same musicians, as well as Dolly Parton, Gretchen Wilson, Kathy Mattea, Montgomery Gentry, Del McCoury and Gord Bamford.

== Early life ==
Fleenor was born in Springdale, Arkansas. She started learning to play the violin when she was three-years-old. She studied the Suzuki method of playing. She played alongside her parents, with her mother playing the piano and her father the violin.

Fleenor started playing the fiddle, at the age of five, after hearing the song Faded Love by Bob Wills. She became a fiddle player for the band at a local Opry house when she was ten. She found influence in the playing of many Nashville musicians including Brent Mason, Paul Franklin, Rob Hajacos, Mark O’Connor, Ricky Skaggs, Steve Wariner and Vince Gill to name a few.

She relocated to Nashville, Tennessee in 2001 to attend college. She sat in with a bluegrass band during a show and Larry Cordle asked her a few days later to perform with him. She quit college and became a full time musician.

== Career ==
Fleenor plays fiddle, mandolin and acoustic guitar. She also is a singer-songwriter.

Early in her career, she toured with Martina McBride and Terri Clark. In the 2010s, she began playing mandolin and acoustic guitar to compensate for low industry demand for fiddle. She was named the Country Music Association's Touring Musician of the Year in 2015. She began performing with Jon Pardi, a neotraditional singer-songwriter credited with helping to keep traditional instruments in popular country. She performed fiddle on Pardi's 2019 album Heartache Medication, including the song by the same title.

In 2019, she released her debut album, Fiddle & Steel. That same year, she was nominated for, and awarded, the Country Music Association's Musician of the Year Award, the first for a woman. That same year, she was nominated for the Academy of Country Music's Speciality Instrument Player of the Year Award, the only woman to ever be nominated for the award. Fleenor has toured with Steven Tyler, Jon Pardi and Blake Shelton. She also performed in the house band on The Voice.

In 2023 she helped launch an American acoustic all-star band, Wood Box Heroes (with Josh Martin, Barry Bales, and Matt Menefee) and in 2024 they had the most played song on Bluegrass radio with “Cross The Line.”

In 2024 she started touring with George Strait and the Ace in the Hole Band after the passing of his long time fiddler and one of her fiddle heroes, Gene Elders.

== Awards and nominations ==
Year	Award	Category	Result
2018	Academy of Country Music Awards	Specialty Instruments Player of the Year	Nominated
2019	Academy of Country Music Awards	Specialty Instruments Player of the Year	Won
2019	Country Music Association Awards	Musician of the Year	Won
2020	Country Music Association Awards	Musician of the Year	Won
2021	Country Music Association Awards	Musician of the Year	Won
2022	Country Music Association Awards	Musician of the Year	Won
2022	Academy of Country Music Awards	Specialty Instruments Player of the Year	Won
2023	Country Music Association Awards	Musician of the Year	Won
2024	Country Music Association Awards	Musician of the Year	Nominated
2024	Academy of Country Music Awards	Specialty Instruments Player of the Year	Won
2025	Country Music Association Awards	Musician of the Year	Pending
2026	Grammy Awards	Best Country Song ("A Song to Sing")	Pending
