= Jon Pardi =

American country singer (born 1985)

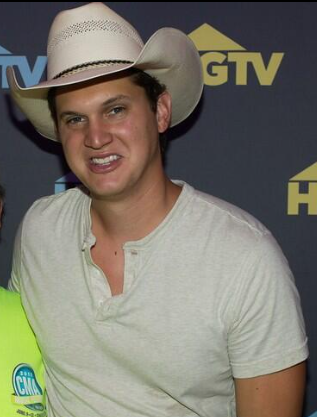
- Pardi in 2014

Background information
- Born: Jonathan Ryan Pardi; May 20, 1985 (age 41); Dixon, California, United States
- Origin: Nashville, Tennessee, U.S.
- Genres: Country
- Occupations: Singer; songwriter; record producer
- Instruments: Vocals; guitar
- Years active: 2012–present
- Label: Capitol Nashville
- Spouse: Summer Duncan (m. 2020; div. 2026)
- Website: www.jonpardi.com

Jonathan Ryan Pardi (born May 20, 1985) is an American country music singer and songwriter. Signed to Capitol Nashville, he has released five studio albums: Write You a Song (2014), California Sunrise (2016), Heartache Medication (2019), Mr. Saturday Night (2022), and Honkytonk Hollywood (2025). Pardi has also charted fourteen singles on the Billboard Hot Country Songs and Country Airplay charts, of which four have hit number one on the latter: "Head Over Boots", "Dirt on My Boots", "Heartache Medication" and "Last Night Lonely".

In 2023, he gained one of country music's crowning achievements when he was inducted as a member of the Grand Ole Opry.

== Biography ==
Pardi grew up in Dixon, California, where he attended Dixon High School, graduating in 2003. Pardi started writing music at age 12, and by 14, the young singer formed his own small band. After high school, he moved to Nashville to pursue his music career.

== Music career ==
=== 2010–2015: Beginnings and Write You a Song ===
In 2010, Pardi toured as an opening act for labelmate Dierks Bentley.

In March 2012, Pardi released his debut single, "Missin' You Crazy". It debuted at number 58 on the U.S. Billboard Hot Country Songs chart for the week of April 14, 2012, and peaked at number 29. It received three stars from Taste of Country's Billy Dukes. "Up All Night", his second single, was released in that same month in 2013, and became his first top 10 hit. His third single, "What I Can't Put Down", was also released that month in 2014. The album's fourth single, "When I've Been Drinkin'", was released to country radio on September 22, 2014. Those four songs all appear on Pardi's debut studio album, Write You a Song, which was released on January 14, 2014, via Capitol Nashville. In May 2015, Pardi released a six-song extended play of songs recorded for but not included on Write You a Song, titled The B-Sides, 2011–2014.

Pardi served as one of the opening acts on Alan Jackson's "Keepin' It Country Tour" and on Dierks Bentley's Riser Tour, both in 2014. His first headlining tour was the "Up All Night Tour" in late 2014, with Joey Hyde as the opening act. In August 2015, Pardi announced an 18-show headlining tour with Brothers Osborne as the opening act, named the All-Time High Tour, with dates from October through January 2016.

=== 2016–2018: California Sunrise ===
Pardi's second studio album, titled California Sunrise, was announced in March 2016, with a release date of June 17, 2016. The album's lead single was "Head Over Boots". In 2016, this song became Pardi's first number-one single on the Country Airplay charts; it also held the number-one position on the Billboard Year-End chart for Country Airplay. After this came "Dirt on My Boots", written by Rhett Akins, Jesse Frasure, and Ashley Gorley, which also topped Country Airplay. The album accounted for three more singles after these: "Heartache on the Dance Floor", "She Ain't in It", and "Night Shift".

=== 2019–2024: Heartache Medication and Mr. Saturday Night ===
In 2019, Pardi joined Brooks & Dunn on a new version of their hit single "My Next Broken Heart" for their album Reboot. In an interview, Ronnie Dunn revealed that, while some of the guest artists on their album had an idea of what they wanted their duets to sound like that differed from Brooks & Dunn's recordings, Pardi was insistent that they record the song exactly as it had been in 1991 as he was such a big fan of the original.

On May 20, 2019, one day after appearing as a guest on the season finale of American Idol Pardi released the staunchly neotraditional track "Heartache Medication", the lead single and title track to his third studio album, also titled Heartache Medication.

On March 16, 2020, Pardi released "Ain't Always the Cowboy" as a single, where it peaked at 3 on Billboard's Country Airplay, 6 on the Hot Country Songs chart, and 55 on the Hot 100. On August 14, 2020, Pardi released the cover album Rancho Fiesta Sessions, which included covers of various country and rock tracks. On August 28, 2020, Pardi released the "Western Version" of "Ain't Always the Cowboy". On October 2, 2020, Pardi released the deluxe edition of Heartache Medication, which featured two new tracks and the "Western Version" of "Ain't Always the Cowboy". Pardi contributed a cover of the Metallica song "Wherever I May Roam" to the charity tribute album The Metallica Blacklist, released in September 2021.

Pardi released his fourth album, Mr. Saturday Night, in September 2022. The album's lead single "Last Night Lonely" charted earlier in the year.

On April 28, 2023, Pardi became the first Californian invited to join the Grand Ole Opry. He was invited at Stagecoach Festival by Guy Fieri and Alan Jackson. His formal induction came on the October 26 broadcast.

On September 2, 2023, Pardi earned his sixth career number-one song with "Your Heart or Mine", written by Justin Ebach, John Pierce, and album co-producer Bart Butler.

=== 2024–present: Honkytonk Hollywood ===
On September 6, 2024, Pardi released the debut single for his 2025 album, "Friday Night Heartbreaker". In December 2024, he announced his Honkytonk Hollywood Tour. On January 17, 2025, he officially announced his fifth studio album, Honkytonk Hollywood, with a release date of April 11, 2025. He released the album's title single on same day. The album is produced by Jay Joyce, their first together, and includes 17 tracks. It was described as the "most grown-up record" he has made.

== Personal life ==
On October 2, 2019, Pardi got engaged to his girlfriend, hairdresser Summer Duncan. He proposed to her while on stage during his concert at the Ryman Auditorium in Nashville. The couple married on November 21, 2020. On September 21, 2022, the couple announced that they were expecting their first child. On February 18, 2023, their daughter was born. On January 7, 2024, the couple announced that they were expecting their second child. On July 16, 2024, their second child, a daughter, was born. On July 3, 2026, the couple announced that they were divorcing.

== Discography ==
Studio albums

- Write You a Song (2014)
- California Sunrise (2016)
- Heartache Medication (2019)
- Mr. Saturday Night (2022)
- Merry Christmas from Jon Pardi (2023)
- Honkytonk Hollywood (2025)

== Tours ==
Headlining

- 2014: Up All Night Tour (Fall tour promoting album)
- 2015/2016: All Time High Tour, presented by Texas Roadhouse
- 2017: CMT on Tour Presents "Jon Pardi's Lucky Tonight Tour"
- 2019: Heartache Medication Tour (Fall tour promoting album)
- 2022: Ain't Always the Cowboy Tour
- 2023-24: Mr Saturday Night World Tour
- 2025: Honkytonk Hollywood Tour
- 2026: Gamblin' Man Tour

Supporting

- 2014: Riser Tour with Dierks Bentley
- 2015: Keepin' It Country Tour with Alan Jackson
- 2016: Me And My Kind- Fall Tour with Kip Moore
- 2017: What The Hell World Tour with Dierks Bentley
- 2018: Livin' Like Hippies Tour with Miranda Lambert
- 2018: What Makes You Country Tour with Luke Bryan
- 2019: Burning Man Tour with Dierks Bentley

== Television appearances ==
Year	Title	Role	Notes
2014	The Bachelorette	Himself	Guest Performer
2016	Still the King	Roy Orbison Impersonator	Scripted Cameo on CMT series
2019	American Idol	Himself	Finale performance with Idol winner, Laine Hardy
2019	CMT Crossroads	Himself	Alongside Brooks and Dunn
2019	Celebrity Family Feud	Contestant	Representing team Bobby Bones
2020–2022	Pardi Time	Host	CMT Digital Variety Series; 8 episodes + 2 Holiday specials
2022	CMT's Campfire Sessions: Christmas Edition	Host	

== Awards and nominations ==
Year	Award	Category	Recipient/Work	Result	Ref
2017	Country Music Association Awards	New Artist of the Year	Himself	Won	
2017	Country Music Association Awards	Single of the Year	"Dirt On My Boots"	Nominated	
2017	Country Music Association Awards	Song of the Year	"Dirt On My Boots"	Nominated	
2017	CMT Music Awards	Breakthrough Video of The Year	"Dirt On My Boots"	Nominated	
2017	Academy of Country Music Awards	New Male Vocalist of the Year	Himself	Won	
2017	American Music Awards	Favorite Song - Country	"Dirt On My Boots"	Nominated	
2018	iHeartRadio Music Awards	Country Song of the Year	"Dirt On My Boots"	Nominated	
2018	iHeartRadio Music Awards	Best New Country Artist	Himself	Nominated	
2018	Academy of Country Music Awards	Album of the Year	California Sunrise	Nominated	
2018	CMT Music Awards	Male Video of the Year	"Heartache on the Dance Floor"	Nominated	
2020	Academy of Country Music Awards	Album of the Year	Heartache Medication	Nominated	
2020	Country Music Association Awards	Album of the Year	Heartache Medication	Nominated	
2020	CMT Music Awards	Collaborative Video	"Beer Can't Fix" with Thomas Rhett	Nominated	
2022	CMT Music Awards	Digital-First Performance	"On the Other Hand/ Forever and Ever, Amen" (Randy Travis Tribute)	Nominated	
2023	CMT Music Awards	Collaborative Video	"Longneck Way to Go" with Midland	Nominated	
2023	Academy of Country Music Awards	Album of the Year	Mr. Saturday Night	Nominated	
