= Eric Church discography =

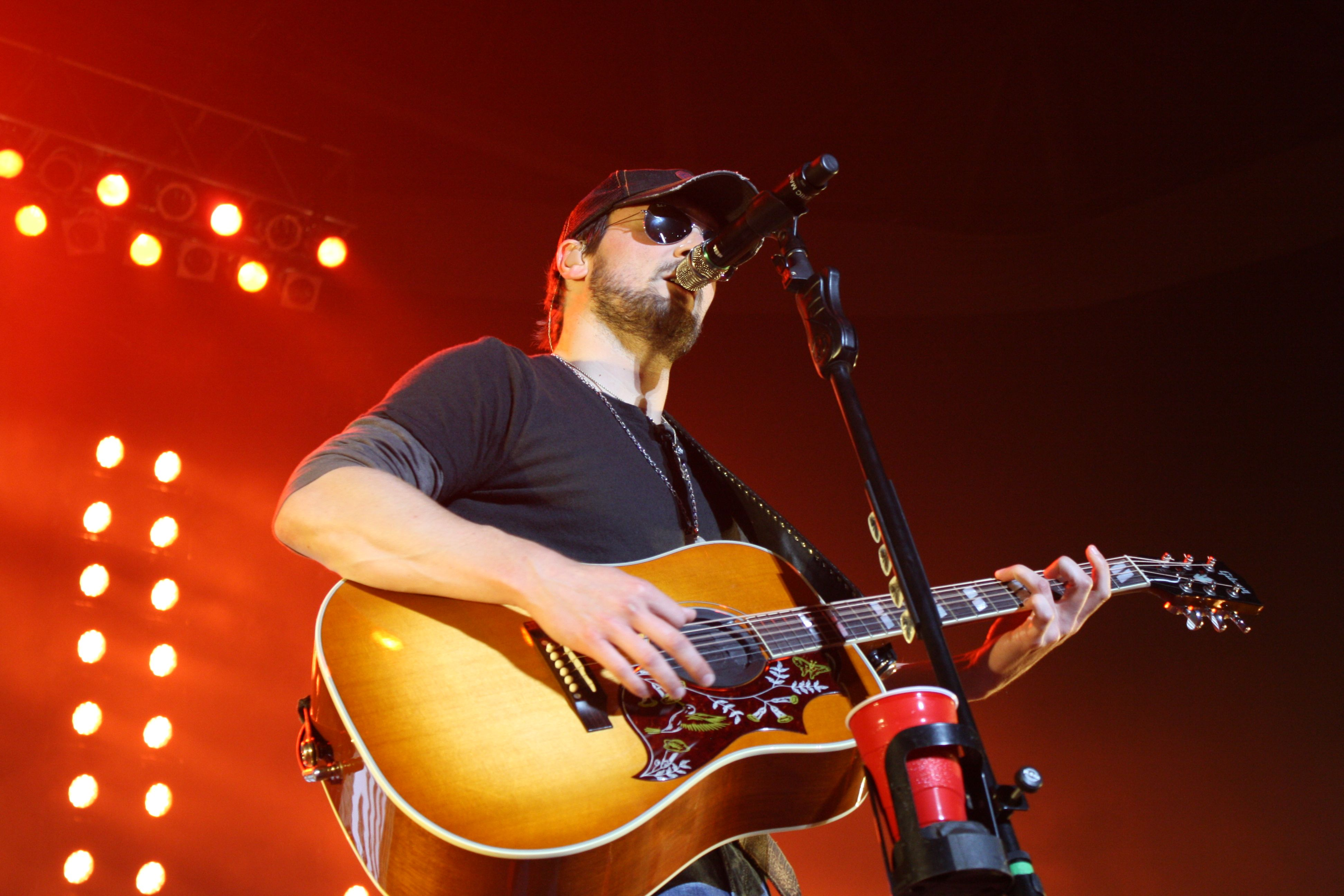
- Church in 2012
- Studio albums: 8
- Extended plays: 3
- Live albums: 3
- Compilation albums: 1
- Singles: 31
- Music videos: 30
- Other charted songs: 6
- No. 1 singles: 11

American country music artist Eric Church has released eight studio albums, three live albums, three extended plays, and 29 singles (including six as a featured artist). He made his debut on the Billboard Hot Country Songs with his 2006 single "How 'Bout You". Church charted eight more singles between then and 2011 when he achieved his first number-one single with "Drink in My Hand". This would be the first of six solo number-one singles for him in his career, the other five being "Springsteen" in 2012, "Give Me Back My Hometown" and "Talladega" in 2014, "Record Year" in 2016, and "Some of It" in 2019. Church was also a featured artist on four other songs that have reached the top of the country music charts. These are Jason Aldean's "The Only Way I Know" (also featuring Luke Bryan) in 2012, Keith Urban's "Raise 'Em Up" in 2015, the multi-artist collaboration "Forever Country" in 2016 (credited to the Artists of Then, Now, and Forever), and Luke Combs' "Does to Me" in 2020.

Church has released six studio albums for Capitol Records Nashville/EMI Nashville: Sinners Like Me, Carolina, Chief, The Outsiders, Mr. Misunderstood, and Desperate Man. Of these, Chief is his most commercially successful, having been certified triple-platinum by the Recording Industry Association of America (RIAA). Both this album and The Outsiders are his most successful on the charts, having topped both Top Country Albums and the Billboard 200 upon their release.

In April 2021, Church released his seventh studio album, the triple set Heart & Soul.

== Studio albums ==
Title	Details	Peak chart positions				Sales	Certifications
Title	Details	US	US Country	AUS	CAN	Sales	Certifications
Sinners Like Me	Release date: July 18, 2006; Label: Capitol Nashville	29	7	—	—	US: 590,000	RIAA: Platinum
Carolina	Release date: March 24, 2009; Label: Capitol Nashville	17	4	—	—	US: 715,000	RIAA: Platinum
Chief	Release date: July 26, 2011; Label: EMI Nashville	1	1	—	7	US: 1,957,700	RIAA: 4× Platinum; MC: Platinum
The Outsiders	Release date: February 11, 2014; Label: EMI Nashville	1	1	23	1	US: 1,240,200	RIAA: 2× Platinum; MC: Platinum
Mr. Misunderstood	Release date: November 4, 2015; Label: EMI Nashville	2	2	—	3	US: 599,600	RIAA: Platinum
Desperate Man	Release date: October 5, 2018; Label: EMI Nashville	5	1	63	5	US: 245,100	RIAA: Gold; MC: Gold
Heart	Release date: April 16, 2021; Label: EMI Nashville; Format: CD, LP, digital download, streaming	5	3	—	10	US: 40,000	
Soul	Release date: April 23, 2021; Label: EMI Nashville; Format: CD, LP, digital download, streaming	4	2	—	9	US: 42,000	
Evangeline vs. the Machine	Release date: May 2, 2025; Label: EMI Nashville; Format: CD, LP, digital download, streaming	30	5	—	—		
"—" denotes releases that did not chart

== Live albums ==
Title	Details	Peak chart positions		Sales
Title	Details	US	US Country	Sales
Caught in the Act	Release date: April 9, 2013; Label: EMI Nashville	5	3	US: 107,000
61 Days in Church	Release date: December 2017; Label: EMI Nashville	—	—	US: 20,000
Evangeline vs. the Machine: Comes Alive	Release date: February 13, 2026; Label: EMI Nashville	—	—	
"—" denotes releases that did not chart

== Compilation albums ==
Title	Details	Peak chart positions		Sales
Title	Details	US	US Country	Sales
4 Album Collection	Release date: February 11, 2014; Label: EMI Nashville	71	12	US: 7,000

== Extended plays ==
Title	Details	Peak chart positions		Sales
Title	Details	US	US Country	Sales
Caldwell County	Release date: January 18, 2011; Label: EMI Nashville	67	13	
Mr. Misunderstood: On the Rocks, Live and (Mostly) Unplugged	Release date: November 15, 2016; Label: EMI Nashville	57	4	US: 35,900
&	Release date: April 20, 2021; Label: EMI Nashville; Format: LP	83	12	

== Singles ==
=== 2000s ===
Year	Title	Peak chart positions			Certifications (sales threshold)	Album
Year	Title	US	US Country Songs	CAN Country	Certifications (sales threshold)	Album
2006	"How 'Bout You"	85	14	24	RIAA: Gold	Sinners Like Me
2006	"Two Pink Lines"	—	19	31		Sinners Like Me
2007	"Guys Like Me"	99	17	39	RIAA: Platinum	Sinners Like Me
2007	"Sinners Like Me"	—	51	—	RIAA: Gold	Sinners Like Me
2008	"His Kind of Money (My Kind of Love)"	—	46	—		Non-album single
2009	"Love Your Love the Most"	63	10	23	RIAA: 2× Platinum	Carolina
2009	"Hell on the Heart"	67	10	20	RIAA: Platinum	Carolina
"—" denotes releases that did not chart

=== 2010s ===
Year	Title	Peak chart positions					Certifications (sales threshold)	Album
Year	Title	US	US Country Songs	US Country Airplay	CAN	CAN Country	Certifications (sales threshold)	Album
2010	"Smoke a Little Smoke"	78	16		—	39	RIAA: 4× Platinum; MC: Gold	Carolina
2011	"Homeboy"	53	13		—	34	RIAA: 2× Platinum; MC: Gold	Chief
2011	"Drink in My Hand"	40	1		52	1	RIAA: 5× Platinum; MC: Platinum; RMNZ: Gold	Chief
2012	"Springsteen"	19	1		28	1	RIAA: 8× Platinum; MC: 2× Platinum; RMNZ: Gold	Chief
2012	"Creepin'"	56	10	5	65	8	RIAA: 2× Platinum; MC: Gold	Chief
2013	"Like Jesus Does"	59	13	6	56	5	RIAA: Platinum; MC: Gold	Chief
2013	"The Outsiders"	51	6	25	32	37	RIAA: Gold	The Outsiders
2014	"Give Me Back My Hometown"	36	4	1	30	1	RIAA: 2× Platinum; MC: Gold	The Outsiders
2014	"Cold One"	88	20	20	87	19	RIAA: Gold	The Outsiders
2014	"Talladega"	43	2	1	51	1	RIAA: 3× Platinum	The Outsiders
2015	"Like a Wrecking Ball"	51	6	11	75	32	RIAA: 2× Platinum	The Outsiders
2015	"Mr. Misunderstood"	84	15	15	70	7	RIAA: Platinum; MC: Gold	Mr. Misunderstood
2016	"Record Year"	44	2	1	79	1	RIAA: 3× Platinum; MC: Gold	Mr. Misunderstood
2016	"Kill a Word" (featuring Rhiannon Giddens)	71	9	6	71	5	RIAA: Gold	Mr. Misunderstood
2017	"Round Here Buzz"	56	7	2	—	8	RIAA: 2× Platinum	Mr. Misunderstood
2018	"Desperate Man"	68	8	13	61	4	RIAA: Platinum; MC: Gold	Desperate Man
2019	"Some of It"	43	7	1	77	3	RIAA: Platinum	Desperate Man
2019	"Monsters"	— (Note: "Monsters" did not enter the Billboard Hot 100, but peaked at number 2 on the Bubbling Under Hot 100 chart.)	20	15	—	11	RIAA: Gold	Desperate Man
"—" denotes releases that did not chart

=== 2020s ===
Year	Title	Peak chart positions					Certifications (sales threshold)	Album
Year	Title	US	US Country Songs	US Country Airplay	CAN	CAN Country	Certifications (sales threshold)	Album
2020	"Stick That in Your Country Song"	92	23	22	76	14	MC: Gold; RIAA: Gold	Heart & Soul
2020	"Hell of a View"	28	2	1	32	1	MC: Platinum; RIAA: Platinum	Heart & Soul
2021	"Heart on Fire"	56	12	5	64	5	RIAA: Platinum	Heart & Soul
2022	"Doing Life with Me"	—	—	34	—	29	RIAA: Gold	Heart & Soul
2025	"Hands of Time"	70	20	14	96	7		Evangeline vs. the Machine
2026	"On the Road"	—	—	—	—	—		Non-album single

=== As a featured artist ===
Year	Title	Artist	Peak chart positions								Certifications (sales threshold)	Album
Year	Title	Artist	US	US Country Songs	US Country Airplay	CAN	CAN Country	AUS	NZ Hot	SCO	Certifications (sales threshold)	Album
2011	"Country Thang"	Colt Ford (Note: "Country Thang" was not credited as featuring Eric Church on the Billboard chart history pages but Church was listed as featured on the track in the Every Chance I Get album)	—	54		—	—	—	—	—		Every Chance I Get
2012	"The Only Way I Know"	Jason Aldean (with Luke Bryan)	40	5	1	53	2	—	—	—	RIAA: Platinum; MC: Gold	Night Train
2015	"Raise 'Em Up"	Keith Urban	56	8	1	47	1	—	—	—	RIAA: Gold	Fuse
2015	"Are You Ready for the Country?"	Hank Williams, Jr.	—	—	46	—	—	—	—	—		It's About Time
2016	"Forever Country"	Artists of Then, Now & Forever	21	1	33	25	34	26	—	29	RIAA: Gold	—N/a
2020	"Does to Me"	Luke Combs	20	4	1	59	3	—	38	—	RIAA: 2× Platinum; ARIA: Platinum; MC: Gold; RMNZ: Gold	What You See Is What You Get
2023	"Man Made a Bar"	Morgan Wallen	15	3	1	20	1	—	8	—	RIAA: 3× Platinum; ARIA: Gold; RMNZ: Gold	One Thing at a Time
2026	"McArthur"	Hardy, Morgan Wallen and Tim McGraw	31	6	17	41	35	—	—	—		Non-album single
"—" denotes releases that did not chart

== Other charted songs ==
Year	Title	Peak chart positions				Certifications (sales threshold)	Album
Year	Title	US	US Country Songs	US Country Airplay	CAN	Certifications (sales threshold)	Album
2009	"Carolina"	—	—	—	—	RIAA: Gold	Carolina
2011	"Jack Daniels"	—	—	—	—	RIAA: Gold	Chief
2011	"Over When It's Over"	—	—	—	—	RIAA: Gold	Chief
2013	"Keep On"	—	—	55	—		Chief
2013	"Hungover & Hard Up"	—	—	57	—		Chief
2014	"A Man Who Was Gonna Die Young"	89	24	—	57		The Outsiders
2014	"That's Damn Rock & Roll"	—	43	—	—		The Outsiders
2015	"Roller Coaster Ride"	—	—	52	—		The Outsiders
2015	"Mixed Drinks About Feelings"	—	— (Note: "Mixed Drinks About Feelings" did not enter the Hot Country Songs chart, but peaked at number 40 on the Country Digital Song Sales chart.)	—	—		Mr. Misunderstood
2018	"Heart Like a Wheel"	—	35	—	—		Desperate Man
2020	"Bad Mother Trucker"	—	— (Note: "Bad Mother Trucker" did not enter the Hot Country Songs chart, but peaked at number 8 on the Country Digital Song Sales chart.)	—	— (Note: "Bad Mother Trucker" did not enter the Canadian Hot 100, but peaked at number 35 on the Hot Canadian Digital Song Sales chart.)		Soul
2020	"Crazyland"	—	41	—	— (Note: "Crazyland" did not enter the Canadian Hot 100, but peaked at number 35 on the Hot Canadian Digital Song Sales chart.)		Heart
2020	"Through My Ray-Bans"	—	49	—	— (Note: "Through My Ray-Bans" did not enter the Canadian Hot 100, but peaked at number 26 on the Hot Canadian Digital Song Sales chart.)		&
2021	"Never Break Heart"	—	— (Note: "Never Break Heart" did not enter the Hot Country Songs chart, but peaked at number 19 on the Country Digital Song Sales chart.)	—	—		Heart
2021	"Bunch of Nothing"	—	44	—	—		Heart
2024	"Darkest Hour (Helene Edit)"	— (Note: "Darkest Hour" did not enter the Billboard Hot 100, but peaked at number 21 on the Bubbling Under Hot 100 chart.)	38	25	—		Evangeline vs. the Machine
2025	"Number 3 and Number 7" (with Morgan Wallen)	52	27	—	—		I'm the Problem
"—" denotes releases that did not chart

== Other appearances ==
Year	Song	Album
2018	"Oo De Lally"	King of the Road: A Tribute to Roger Miller

== Music videos ==
Year	Video	Director
2006	"How 'Bout You"	Scott Speer
2006	"Two Pink Lines"	Peter Zavadil
2007	"Guys Like Me"	—N/a
2007	"Lightning"	—N/a
2009	"Love Your Love the Most"	—N/a
2010	"Hell on the Heart"	—N/a
2010	"Smoke a Little Smoke"	Peter Zavadil
2011	"Homeboy"	Peter Zavadil
2011	"Drink in My Hand"	Peter Zavadil
2012	"Springsteen"	Peter Zavadil
2012	"Creepin'"	Peter Zavadil
2012	"The Only Way I Know" (live) (with Jason Aldean and Luke Bryan)	Paul Miller
2013	"Like Jesus Does"	John Peets
2013	"Over When It's Over"	Peter Zavadil
2014	"Give Me Back My Hometown"	Peter Zavadil
2014	"A Man Who Was Gonna Die Young"	Peter Zavadil
2014	"Cold One"	Peter Zavadil
2014	"Talladega"	Peter Zavadil
2015	"Raise 'Em Up" (with Keith Urban)	Chris Hicky
2015	"Like a Wrecking Ball" (live)	Joe DeMaio
2015	"Mr. Misunderstood"	Reid Long/John Peets
2015	"Are You Ready for the Country?" (with Hank Williams, Jr.)	Peter Zavadil
2016	"Record Year"	Reid Long/John Peets
2016	"Forever Country" (with Artists of Then, Now and Forever)	Joseph Kahn
2016	"Kill a Word" (Live at Red Rocks)	Shaun Silva
2017	"Round Here Buzz"	Reid Long
2018	"Desperate Man"	—N/a
2019	"Some of It"	Reid Long
2020	"Does to Me" (with Luke Combs)	Jon Small/Trey Fanjoy
2021	"Heart On Fire"	Reid Long
2022	"You, Me & The River (with Chris Janson)"	Reid Long
