= 48th Annual Country Music Association Awards =

2014 US music award ceremony

2014 Country Music Association Awards
- Date: November 5, 2014
- Location: Bridgestone Arena, Nashville, Tennessee, U.S.
- Hosted by: Brad Paisley; Carrie Underwood

Highlights
- Most wins: Miranda Lambert (4)
- Most nominations: Miranda Lambert (9)

Television/radio coverage
- Network: ABC
- Viewership: 16.1 million

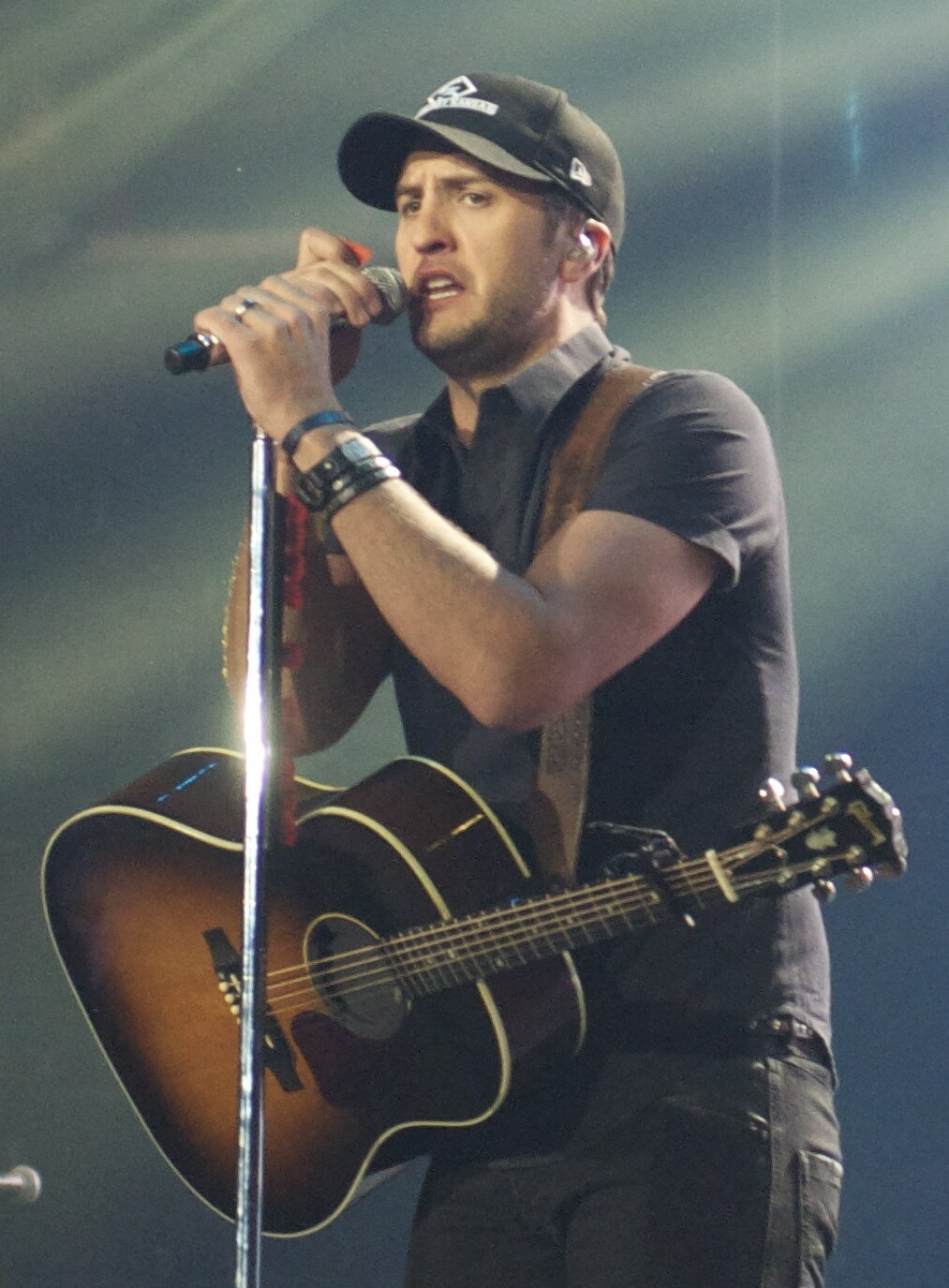
Luke Bryan, Entertainer of the Year recipient.

The 48th Annual Country Music Association Awards were held on November 5, 2014, at Bridgestone Arena in Nashville and were hosted by Brad Paisley and Carrie Underwood, marking their seventh time as co-hosts. Miranda Lambert became the most awarded female artist in CMA history with eleven wins, a record she extended in 2015, 2017, and 2020.

== Nominees and winners ==
Winners are shown in bold.

Entertainer of the Year	Album of the Year
**Luke Bryan**; Miranda Lambert; Blake Shelton; George Strait; Keith Urban	**Platinum** — **Miranda Lambert**; Fuse — Keith Urban; Crash My Party — Luke Bryan; Riser — Dierks Bentley; The Outsiders — Eric Church
Male Vocalist of the Year	Female Vocalist of the Year
**Blake Shelton**; Luke Bryan; Eric Church; Dierks Bentley; Keith Urban	**Miranda Lambert**; Martina McBride; Kacey Musgraves; Taylor Swift; Carrie Underwood
Vocal Group of the Year	Vocal Duo of the Year
**Little Big Town**; Eli Young Band; Lady Antebellum; The Band Perry; Zac Brown Band	**Florida Georgia Line**; Dan + Shay; Love and Theft; The Swon Brothers; Thompson Square
Single of the Year	Song of the Year
**"Automatic"** — **Miranda Lambert**; "Drunk on a Plane" — Dierks Bentley; "Give Me Back My Hometown" — Eric Church; "Meanwhile Back at Mama's" — Tim McGraw and Faith Hill; "Mine Would Be You" — Blake Shelton	**"Follow Your Arrow"** — **Brandy Clark**, **Shane McAnally** and **Kacey Musgraves**; "Automatic" — Nicolle Galyon, Miranda Lambert and Natalie Hemby; "Give Me Back My Hometown" — Eric Church and Luke Laird; "I Don't Dance" — Rob Hatch, Lee Brice and Dallas Davidson; "I Hold On" — Brett James and Dierks Bentley
New Artist of the Year	Musician of the Year
**Brett Eldredge**; Brandy Clark; Kip Moore; Thomas Rhett; Cole Swindell	**Mac McAnally**; Jerry Douglas; Paul Franklin; Dann Huff; Sam Bush
Music Video of the Year	Musical Event of the Year
**"Drunk on a Plane"** — **Dierks Bentley; (Dir. Wes Edwards)**; "Bartender" — Lady Antebellum; (Dir. Shane Drake); "Automatic" — Miranda Lambert; (Dir. Trey Fanjoy); "Follow Your Arrow" — Kacey Musgraves; (Dir. Honey and Kacey Musgraves); "Somethin' Bad" — Miranda Lambert and Carrie Underwood; (Dir. Trey Fanjoy)	**"We Were Us"** — **Keith Urban** and **Miranda Lambert**; "Meanwhile Back at Mama's" — Tim McGraw and Faith Hill; "Somethin' Bad" — Miranda Lambert and Carrie Underwood; "Bakersfield" — Vince Gill and Paul Franklin; "You Can't Make Old Friends" — Kenny Rogers and Dolly Parton

=== Special awards ===
Award	Recipient
Irving Waugh	**Vince Gill**

== Performers ==
Artist(s)	Song(s)
Kenny Chesney	"American Kids"
Miranda Lambert; Meghan Trainor	"All About That Bass"
Lady Antebellum	"Bartender"
Florida Georgia Line	"Dirt"
Keith Urban	"Somewhere in My Car"
The Band Perry	"Gentle On My Mind"
Kacey Musgraves; Loretta Lynn	"You're Lookin' at Country"
Jason Aldean	"Burnin' It Down"
Little Big Town; Ariana Grande	"Day Drinking" "Bang Bang"
Tim McGraw	"Shotgun Rider"
Dierks Bentley	"Drunk on a Plane"
Brad Paisley	"Perfect Storm"
Blake Shelton; Ashley Monroe	"Lonely Tonight"
Carrie Underwood	"Something In The Water"
Luke Bryan	"Roller Coaster"
Miranda Lambert; Little Big Town	"Smokin' and Drinkin'"
The Doobie Brothers; Hunter Hayes; Hillary Scott; Michael McDonald; Jennifer Nettles	"Listen to the Music" "Takin' It to the Streets"

== Presenters ==
Presenter(s)	Award
Steven Tyler	Single of the Year
Darius Rucker and Tim Tebow	Song of the Year
Lee Brice and Brantley Gilbert	New Artist of the Year
Lucy Hale and Dan + Shay	Vocal Group of the Year
Brett Eldredge, Brandy Clark, and Kip Moore	Vocal Duo of the Year
Martina McBride and Connie Britton	Album of the Year
Trisha Yearwood	Male Vocalist of the Year
Lily Aldridge and Sam Hunt	Female Vocalist of the Year
Garth Brooks	Entertainer of the Year
