= 49th Annual Country Music Association Awards =

2015 US music award ceremony

- Date: November 4, 2015
- Location: Bridgestone Arena, Nashville, Tennessee, U.S.
- Hosted by: Brad Paisley; Carrie Underwood

Highlights
- Most wins: Chris Stapleton (3)
- Most nominations: Miranda Lambert (4)

Television/radio coverage
- Network: ABC
- Viewership: 13.62 million

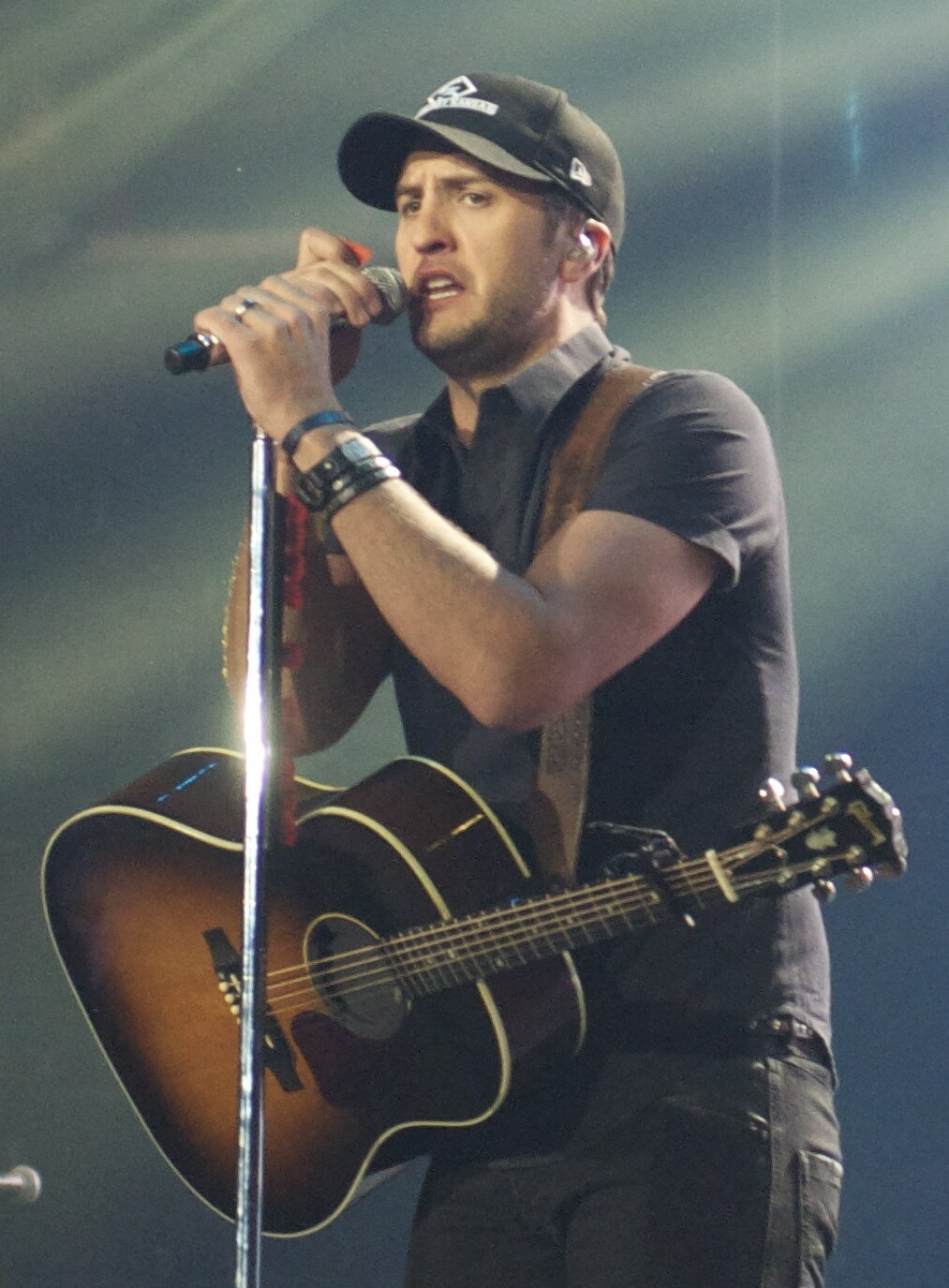
Luke Bryan, Entertainer of the Year recipient.

The 49th Annual Country Music Association Awards were held on November 4, 2015, at the Bridgestone Arena in Nashville and were hosted by Brad Paisley and Carrie Underwood, marking their eighth year as co-hosts.

The nominations for the 49th CMA Awards were announced on September 9, 2015, on Good Morning America by Steven Tyler and Kelsea Ballerini.

== Winners and nominees ==
The winners are in Bold.

Entertainer of the Year	Album of the Year
**Luke Bryan**; Garth Brooks; Kenny Chesney; Eric Church; Miranda Lambert	**Traveler** — **Chris Stapleton**; Pageant Material — Kacey Musgraves; Pain Killer — Little Big Town; The Big Revival — Kenny Chesney; Old Boots, New Dirt — Jason Aldean
Male Vocalist of the Year	Female Vocalist of the Year
**Chris Stapleton**; Dierks Bentley; Luke Bryan; Eric Church; Blake Shelton	**Miranda Lambert**; Kelsea Ballerini; Kacey Musgraves; Carrie Underwood; Lee Ann Womack
Vocal Group of the Year	Vocal Duo of the Year
**Little Big Town**; Lady Antebellum; Rascal Flatts; The Band Perry; Zac Brown Band	**Florida Georgia Line**; Brothers Osborne; Dan + Shay; Maddie & Tae; Thompson Square
Single of the Year	Song of the Year
**"Girl Crush" — Little Big Town**; "American Kids" — Kenny Chesney; "I Don't Dance" — Lee Brice; "Take Your Time" — Sam Hunt; "Talladega" — Eric Church	**"Girl Crush" — Hillary Lindsey, Lori McKenna, and Liz Rose**; "American Kids" — Rodney Clawson, Luke Laird, and Shane McAnally; "Like a Cowboy" — Randy Houser and Brice Long; "Like a Wrecking Ball" —Eric Church and Casey Beathard; "Take Your Time" — Sam Hunt, Josh Osborne, and Shane McAnally
New Artist of the Year	Musician of the Year
**Chris Stapleton**; Kelsea Ballerini; Sam Hunt; Maddie & Tae; Thomas Rhett	**Mac McAnally, Guitar**; Sam Bush, Mandolin; Jerry Douglas, Dobro; Paul Franklin, Steel Guitar; Dann Huff, Guitar
Music Video of the Year	Musical Event of the Year
**"Girl in a Country Song" — Maddie & Tae; (Dir. TK McKamy)**; "Biscuits" — Kacey Musgraves; (Dir. Marc Klasfeld); "Girl Crush" — Little Big Town; (Dir. Karla Welch and Matthew Welch); "Little Red Wagon" — Miranda Lambert; (Dir. Trey Fanjoy); "Something in the Water" — Carrie Underwood; (Dir. Raj Kapoor)	**"Raise 'Em Up" — Keith Urban and Eric Church**; "Lonely Tonight" — Blake Shelton and Ashley Monroe; "Django and Jimmie" — Willie Nelson and Merle Haggard; "Smokin' and Drinkin'" — Miranda Lambert and Little Big Town; "Wild Child" —Kenny Chesney and Grace Potter
Willie Nelson Lifetime Achievement Award
**Johnny Cash†** (posthumous)

Award	Recipient	Ref
Joe Talbot Award	George Jones (posthumus)	

== Performers ==
Performer(s)	Song(s)
Keith Urban	"John Cougar, John Deere, John 3:16"
Little Big Town	"Girl Crush"
Chris Stapleton; Justin Timberlake	"Tennessee Whiskey" "Drink You Away"
Maddie & Tae	"Girl in a Country Song"
Miranda Lambert	"Bathroom Sink"
Blake Shelton	"Gonna"
Kacey Musgraves	Dime Store Cowgirl
Eric Church	Mr. Misunderstood
Carrie Underwood	"Smoke Break"
Thomas Rhett; Fall Out Boy	"Crash And Burn" "Uma Thurman"
Brooks & Dunn; Reba McEntire	"Why Haven't I Heard From You?" "Play Something Country"
Sam Hunt	"Take Your Time"
Jason Aldean	"Gonna Know We Were Here"
Luke Bryan	"Strip It Down"
John Mellencamp; Keith Urban	"Pink Houses"
Kelsea Ballerini	"Love Me Like You Mean It"
Kenny Chesney	"Save It For a Rainy Day"
Hank Williams, Jr; Eric Church	"Are You Ready For the Country?"
Dierks Bentley; Lindsey Stirling	"Riser"
Pentatonix	Tribute to Oak Ridge Boys "Elvira"
Zac Brown Band	"Beautiful Drug"
Florida Georgia Line	"Confession"
Brad Paisley	"Country Nation"

== Presenters ==
Presenter(s)	Award
Edie Brickell and Steve Martin	Single of the Year
Betty Cantrell and Darius Rucker	Song of the Year
Cole Swindell, Heather O'Reilly, and Megan Rapinoe	Vocal Duo of the Year
Pentatonix	Vocal Group of the Year
Lee Ann Womack and Keifer Sutherland	Album of the Year
Brett Eldredge and Cam	New Artist of the Year
Charles Kelley and Hannah Davis	Female Vocalist of the Year
Erika Christensen and Jennifer Nettles	Male Vocalist of the Year
Reba McEntire	Entertainer of the Year
