= Country Music Association Award for New Artist of the Year =

Annual American country music award

- Country: United States
- Presented by: Country Music Association
- First award: 1981
- Currently held by: Zach Top (2025)

The Country Music Association Awards is a major awards show in country music, with one of the primary awards being the New Artist of the Year Award. This award honors artists who have achieved national prominence through their work and are voted to have great success in the genre going forward. The award was known as the Horizon Award from 1981 until 2007 when it received its current title. An artist can be nominated twice in the New Artist category before they become ineligible, although the point at which an artist received "national prominence" is decided by the Country Music Association and is often a source of debate amongst fans and media. The inaugural recipient of this award was Terri Gibbs and the most recent winner is Zach Top.

== Recipients ==
=== 2020s ===
Year	Winner	Nominees
2026	Stephen Wilson Jr.	Avery Anna; Carter Faith; Emily Ann Roberts; Tucker Wetmore
2025	Zach Top	Ella Langley; Shaboozey; Tucker Wetmore; Stephen Wilson Jr.
2024	Megan Moroney	Shaboozey; Nate Smith; Mitchell Tenpenny; Zach Top; Bailey Zimmerman
2023	Jelly Roll	Zach Bryan; Parker McCollum; Megan Moroney; Hailey Whitters
2022	Lainey Wilson	HARDY; Walker Hayes; Cody Johnson; Parker McCollum
2021	Jimmie Allen	Ingrid Andress; Gabby Barrett; Mickey Guyton; HARDY
2020	Morgan Wallen	Jimmie Allen; Ingrid Andress; Gabby Barrett; Carly Pearce

=== 2010s ===
Year	Winner	Nominees
2019	Ashley McBryde	Cody Johnson; Midland; Carly Pearce; Morgan Wallen
2018	Luke Combs	Lauren Alaina; Chris Janson; Midland; Brett Young
2017	Jon Pardi	Lauren Alaina; Luke Combs; Old Dominion; Brett Young
2016	Maren Morris	Kelsea Ballerini; Old Dominion; Brothers Osborne; Cole Swindell
2015	Chris Stapleton	Kelsea Ballerini; Sam Hunt; Maddie & Tae; Thomas Rhett
2014	Brett Eldredge	Brandy Clark; Kip Moore; Thomas Rhett; Cole Swindell
2013	Kacey Musgraves	Lee Brice; Brett Eldredge; Florida Georgia Line; Kip Moore
2012	Hunter Hayes	Lee Brice; Brantley Gilbert; Love and Theft; Thompson Square
2011	The Band Perry	Luke Bryan; Eric Church; Thompson Square; Chris Young
2010	Zac Brown Band	Luke Bryan; Easton Corbin; Jerrod Niemann; Chris Young

=== 2000s ===
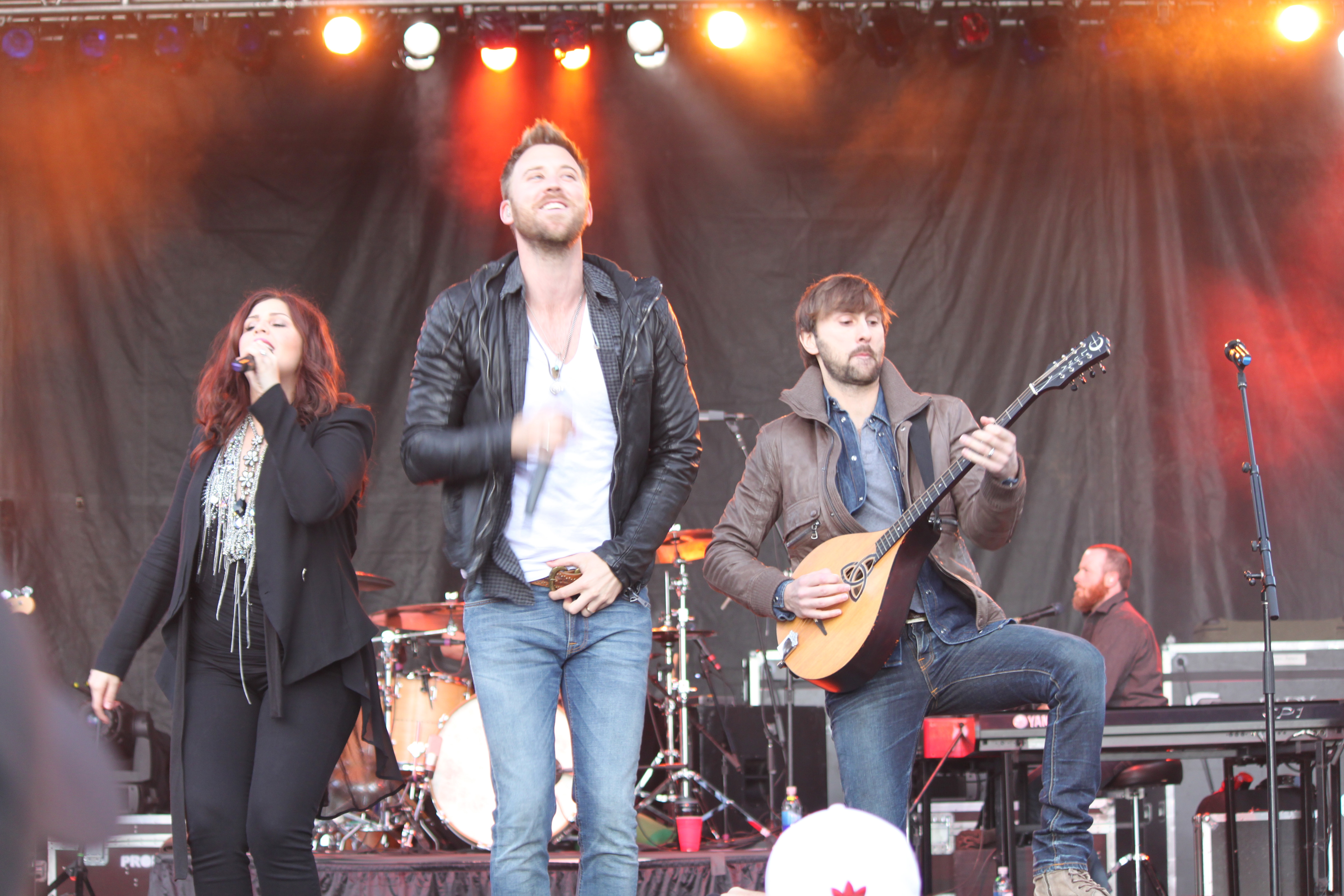
Lady Antebellum won in 2008

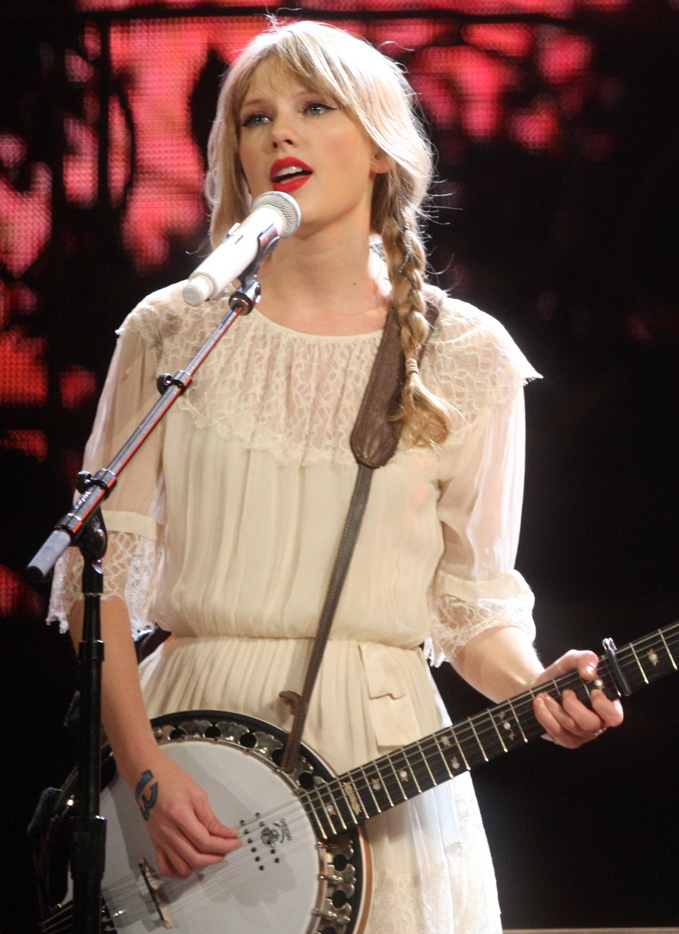
Taylor Swift won the award in 2007

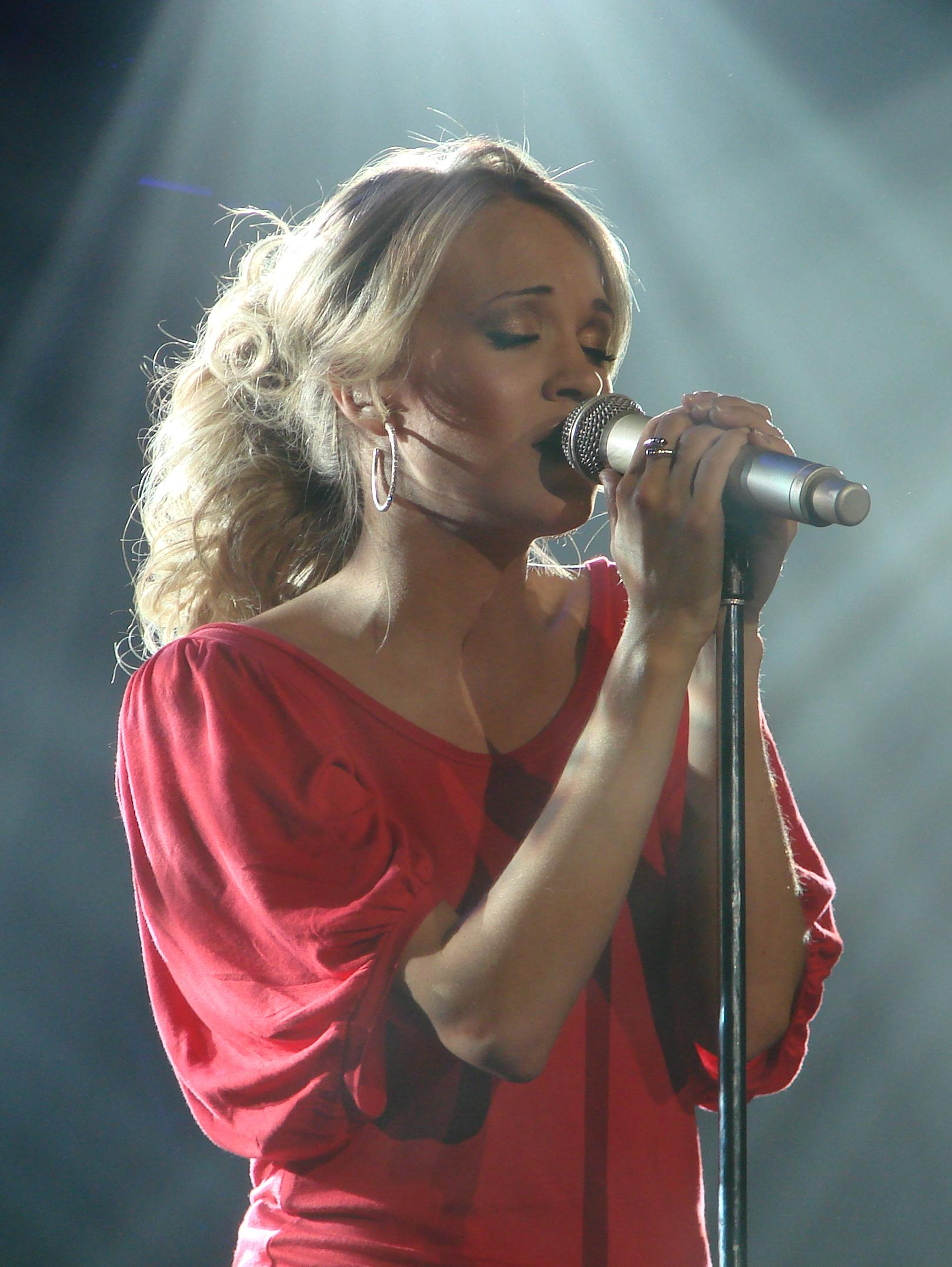
2006 recipient Carrie Underwood

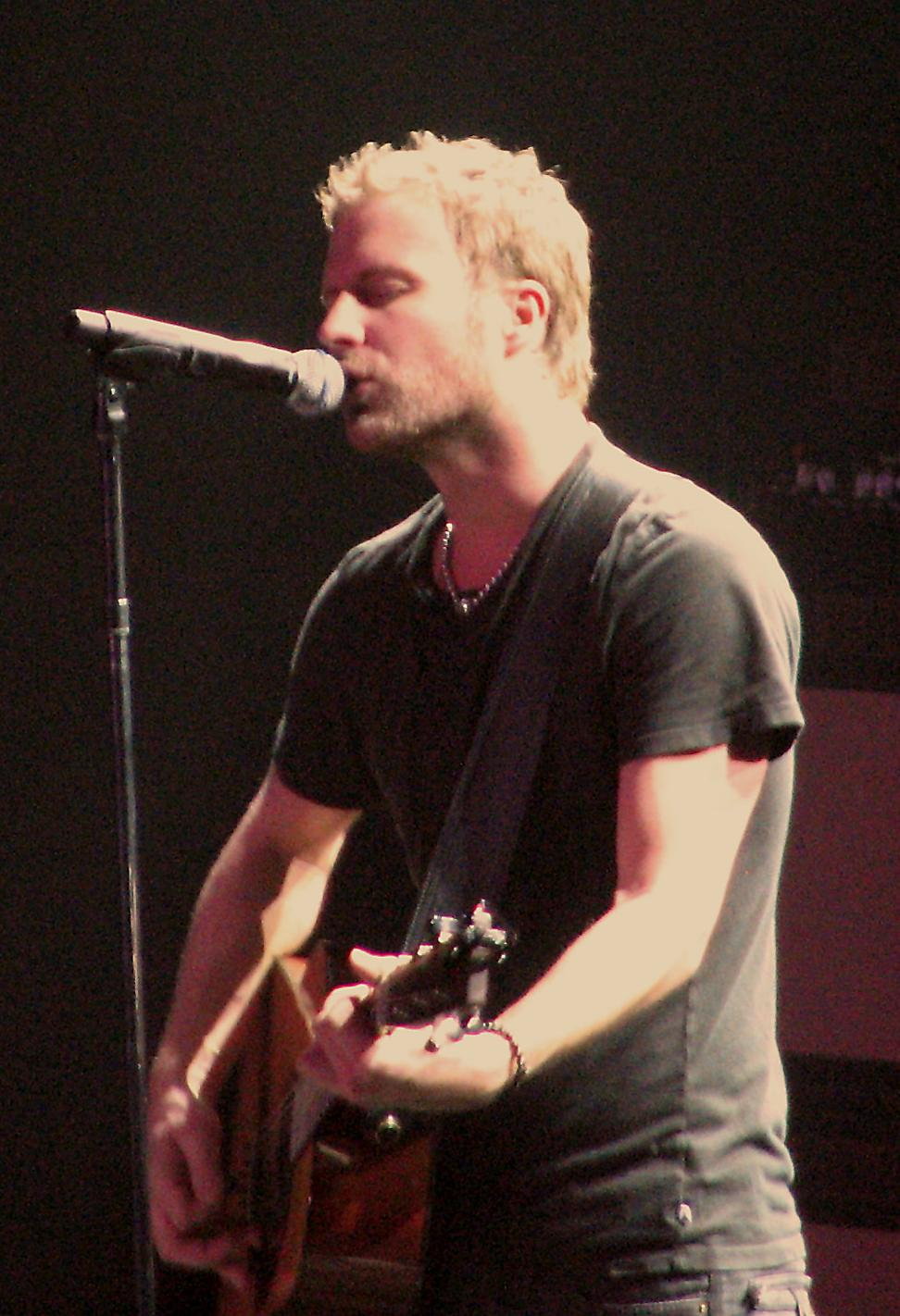
2005 winner Dierks Bentley

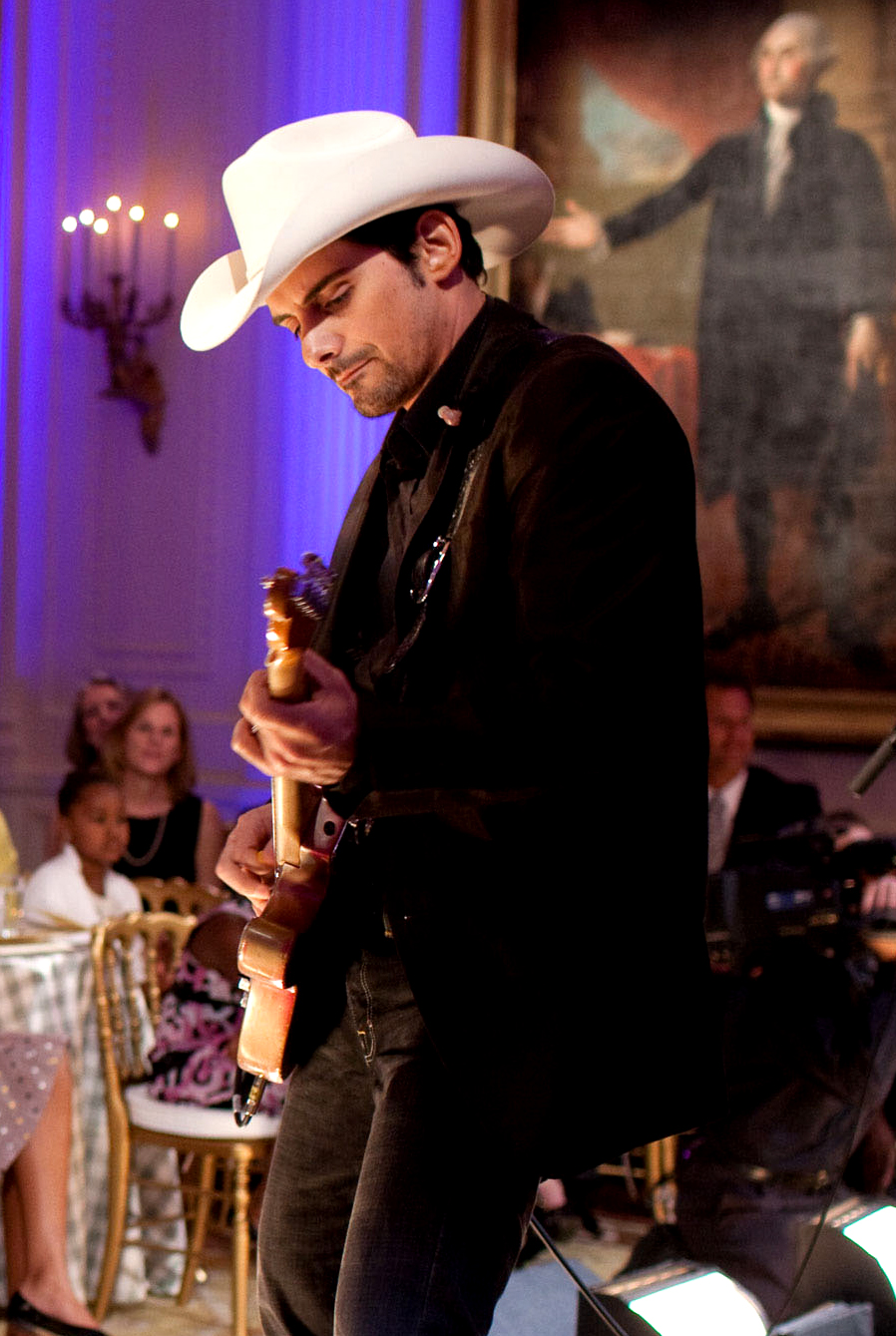
Brad Paisley received the honor in 2000

Year	Winner	Nominees
2009	Darius Rucker	Randy Houser; Jamey Johnson; Jake Owen; Zac Brown Band
2008	Lady Antebellum	Jason Aldean; Rodney Atkins; James Otto; Kellie Pickler
2007	Taylor Swift	Jason Aldean; Rodney Atkins; Little Big Town; Kellie Pickler
2006	Carrie Underwood	Miranda Lambert; Little Big Town; Sugarland; Josh Turner
2005	Dierks Bentley	Big & Rich; Miranda Lambert; Julie Roberts; Sugarland
2004	Gretchen Wilson	Dierks Bentley; Big & Rich; Julie Roberts; Josh Turner
2003	Joe Nichols	Gary Allan; Buddy Jewell; Blake Shelton; Darryl Worley
2002	Rascal Flatts	Carolyn Dawn Johnson; Nickel Creek; Phil Vassar; Darryl Worley
2001	Keith Urban	Jessica Andrews; Nickel Creek; Jamie O'Neal; Phil Vassar
2000	Brad Paisley	Sara Evans; Montgomery Gentry; SHeDAISY; Chely Wright

=== 1990s ===
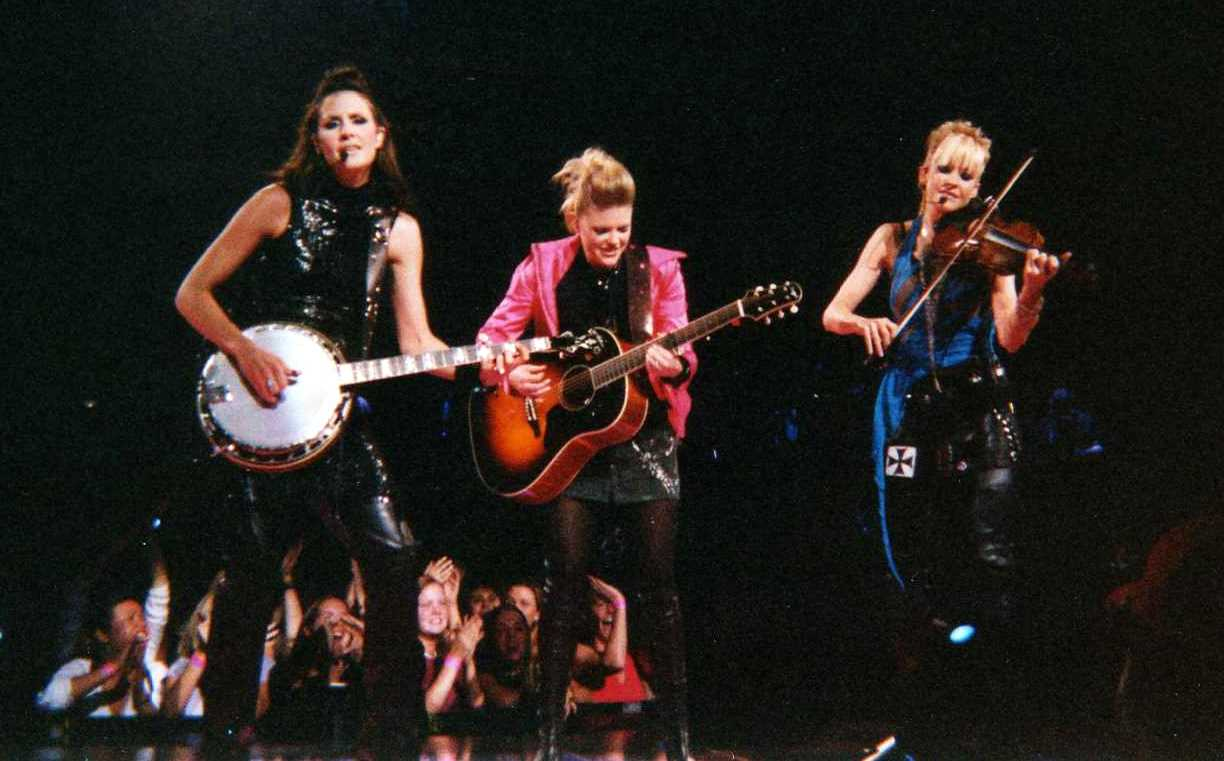
1998 winners Dixie Chicks

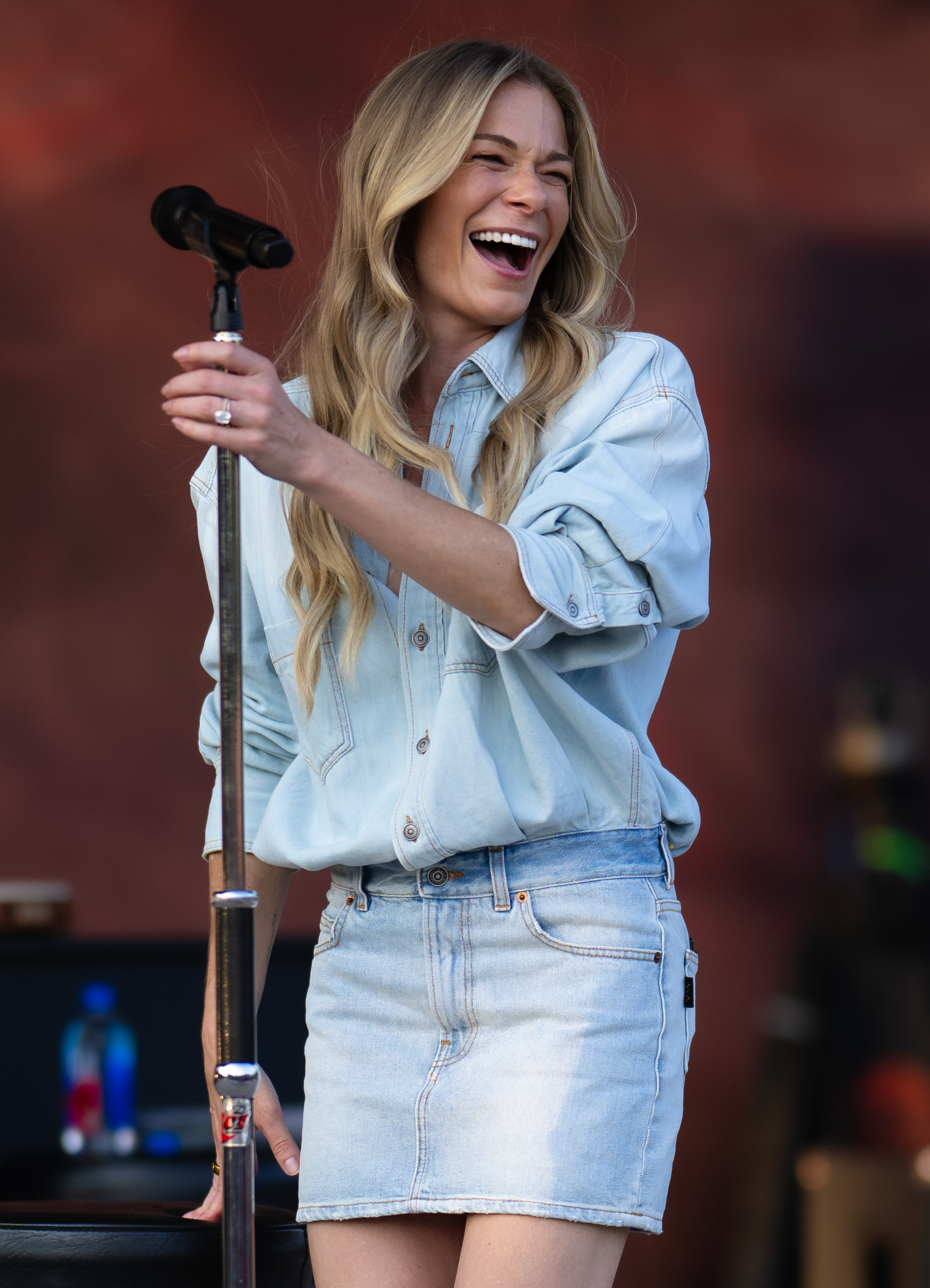
LeAnn Rimes became the youngest person to win a CMA Award when she was honored in 1997 aged fifteen

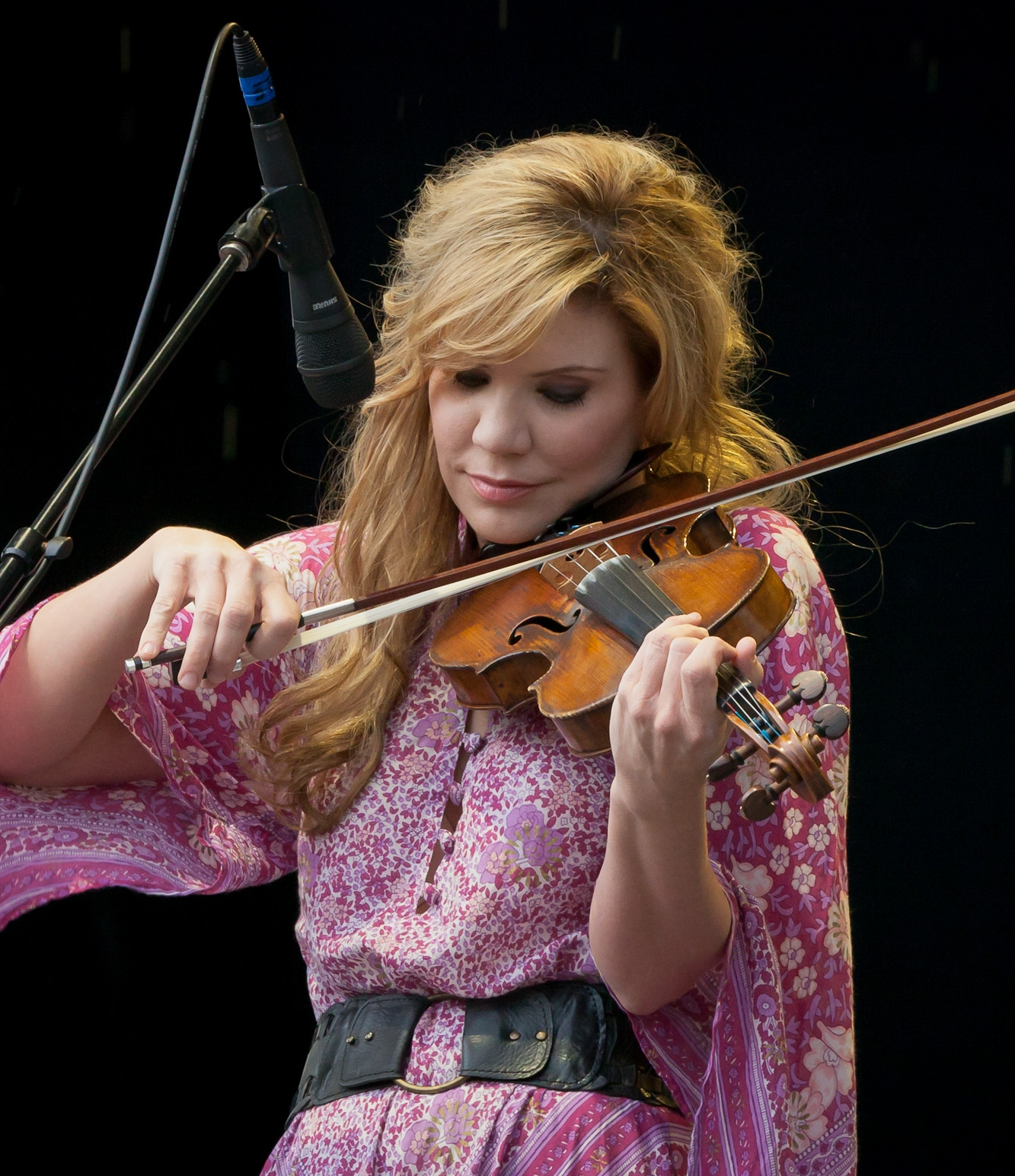
Alison Krauss received the award in 1995

Year	Winner	Nominees
1999	Jo Dee Messina	Kenny Chesney; Sara Evans; The Wilkinsons; Chely Wright
1998	Dixie Chicks	Trace Adkins; Jo Dee Messina; Michael Peterson; Lee Ann Womack
1997	LeAnn Rimes	Trace Adkins; Deana Carter; Terri Clark; Lee Ann Womack
1996	Bryan White	Terri Clark; Wade Hayes; LeAnn Rimes; Shania Twain
1995	Alison Krauss	David Ball; John Berry; Faith Hill; Shania Twain
1994	John Michael Montgomery	Faith Hill; Martina McBride; Tim McGraw; Lee Roy Parnell
1993	Mark Chesnutt	Sammy Kershaw; Tracy Lawrence; John Michael Montgomery; Trisha Yearwood
1992	Suzy Bogguss	Brooks & Dunn; Billy Dean; Pam Tillis; Trisha Yearwood
1991	Travis Tritt	Mary Chapin Carpenter; Mark Chesnutt; Doug Stone; Pam Tillis
1990	Garth Brooks	Alan Jackson; Kentucky Headhunters; Lorrie Morgan; Travis Tritt

=== 1980s ===
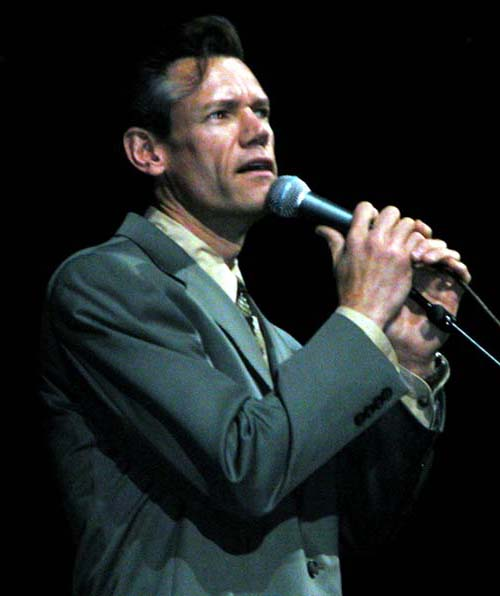
1986 recipient Randy Travis

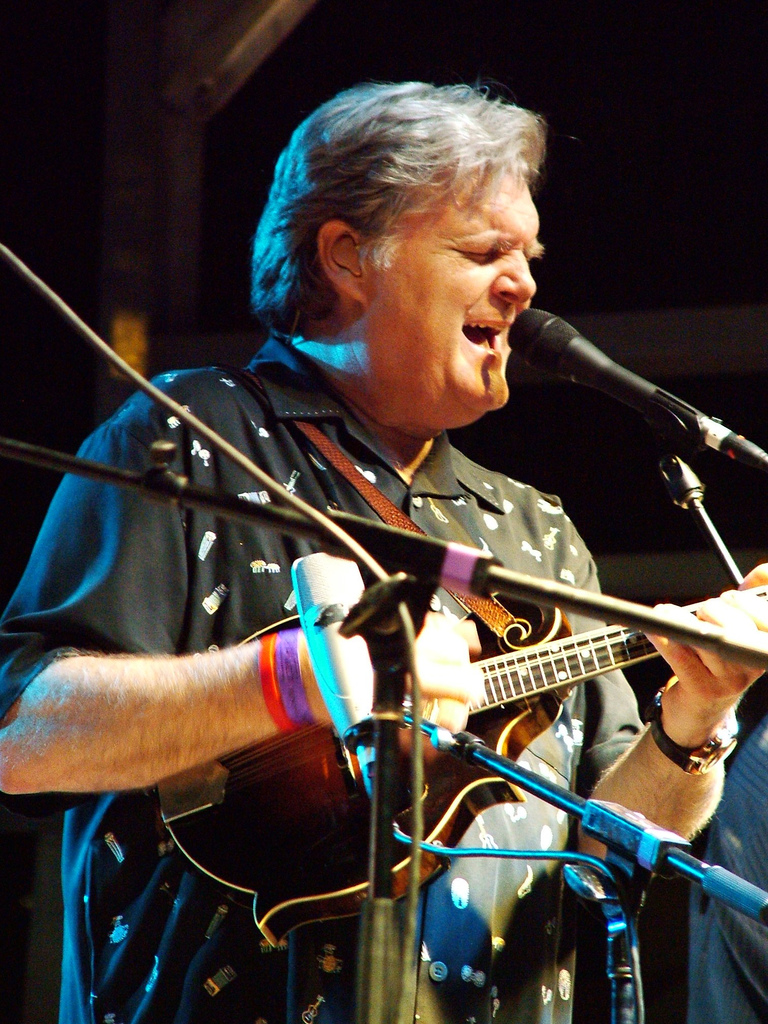
Ricky Skaggs won the award in 1982

Year	Winner	Nominees
1989	Clint Black	Desert Rose Band; Patty Loveless; Shenandoah; Keith Whitley
1988	Ricky Van Shelton	Highway 101; Patty Loveless; K.T. Oslin; Sweethearts of the Rodeo
1987	Holly Dunn	T. Graham Brown; The O'Kanes; Restless Heart; Sweethearts of the Rodeo
1986	Randy Travis	The Forester Sisters; Kathy Mattea; Dan Seals; Dwight Yoakam
1985	Sawyer Brown	Ray Charles; Mel McDaniel; Eddy Raven; John Schneider
1984	The Judds	Deborah Allen; Earl Thomas Conley; Vern Gosdin; Michael Martin Murphey
1983	John Anderson	Vern Gosdin; Reba McEntire; George Strait; The Whites
1982	Ricky Skaggs	John Anderson; Rosanne Cash; David Frizzell; Lee Greenwood
1981	Terri Gibbs	Rosanne Cash; David Frizzell and Shelly West; T. G. Sheppard; Boxcar Willie
