= The Outsiders (Eric Church album) =

Studio album by Eric Church
- Released: February 11, 2014
- Recorded: 2013–14
- Genre: Country; country rock
- Length: 50:42
- Label: EMI Nashville
- Producer: Jay Joyce

Eric Church chronology
Chief (2011)	The Outsiders (2014)	Mr. Misunderstood (2015)

Singles from The Outsiders
- 1. "The Outsiders" Released: October 22, 2013; 2. "Give Me Back My Hometown" Released: January 10, 2014; 3. "Cold One" Released: June 2, 2014; 4. "Talladega" Released: September 15, 2014; 5. "Like a Wrecking Ball" Released: March 9, 2015

The Outsiders is the fourth studio album by American country music artist Eric Church. It was released on February 11, 2014, via EMI Nashville. Like all of his previous albums, it is produced by Jay Joyce. It was before the release that Church received media attention for saying "I think genres are dead."

Two singles were released prior to the album's release: the title track and "Give Me Back My Hometown". Both were met with positive reviews from critics, and charted in the top 10 Hot Country Songs chart. The latter also reached number one on the Billboard Country Airplay chart, becoming his fourth chart-topping single. The album's third single, "Cold One", was released in June 2014 and was a top 20 hit. The fourth single, "Talladega", was released to country radio on September 15, 2014, and became Church's fourth No. 1 hit. The fifth single, "Like a Wrecking Ball", was released to country radio on March 9, 2015.

The album received critical acclaim, and debuted at number one on the Billboard 200 and Top Country Albums chart, with sales of 288,000 in its first week of release. It was the best-selling country album of 2014 in the United States.

== Background ==
In regard to the album's sound and genre, Church emphasized that he does not define his music by genre, calling it an "outdated concept." He goes further to say "I think the interesting thing is that there still are a bunch of stigmas about what this is or what that is. But I think the stigmas go away in the next 10 years, if they're not already going away now. I don't know what that means, I really don't." According to CMT, Church goes further to say "I think genres are dead. There's good music. There's bad music. And I think the cool thing about Nashville is it is at the epicenter of that kind of thinking. I'm a country music artist in Nashville, but Nashville is way, way, way bigger than country music."

After the release of the album, Church urged fans not to shuffle the song list on their playlists, saying "Anybody puts it on shuffle, I”ll come kill them myself. It’s made to be listened to start to finish. You start with 'The Outsiders,' you end with 'The Joint.' There’s two songs on the album, 'That’s Damn Rock & Roll' and 'Talladega.' I love ‘em both, but I don’t love ‘em near as much by themselves as I do in the sequence. The space they get from the songs around them, and the space they give the songs around them, makes me love those songs more. If you take them out, mix them all up — totally different album, it’s a totally different journey. It’s one of the only albums I can think of that I really believe that, if you put it on shuffle, you’re going to have an entirely different experience than if you listen to it the way it’s presented. I don’t know that people do that any more, but it’s meant to be listened to that way."

== Critical reception ==
Professional ratings
Aggregate scores
Source	Rating
Metacritic	82/100
Review scores
Source	Rating
AllMusic	3.5/5 stars
American Songwriter	4/5 stars
Country Weekly	A
Entertainment Weekly	A
The Guardian	3/5 stars
Newsday	B+
The Oakland Press	2.5/4 stars
Rolling Stone	4/5 stars
Spin	9/10
USA Today	4/4 stars

The Outsiders has garnered critical acclaim from music critics. At Metacritic, the album was assigned a "weighted average" score to selected independent ratings and reviews, and based upon eleven reviews, it has a Metascore of an 82, indicating "universal acclaim". The USA Today's Brian Mansfield gave the album a perfect rating of four stars, stating that on the album, Church "steps far outside country music's safety zone" saying that "[i]t's adventurous and outrageous, full of metallic guitars and funky country skronk but also expresses vulnerability and pain." Stephen Thomas Erlewine of AllMusic gave the album a rating of three-and-a-half out of five stars, writing that "[even] if he doesn't quite knock it out of the park when he swings for the fences, he nevertheless scores." At The Oakland Press, Gary Graff gave the album a two-and-a-half out of four star rating, saying that "It's 50 minutes of unapologetic daring that gets messy at times, but it's hard not to give Church big props for keeping his gaze forward." Sarah Rodman of The Boston Globe gave a positive review, telling that "The reckoning continues on the superb follow-up 'The Outsiders'." At Rolling Stone, Will Hermes rated the album four stars out of five, writing that Church "made a record that's weirder, louder [...] and even more badass" on which shows Church's "crafty, ambitious songwriter with a sensitive, rueful side." Jon Caramanica of The New York Times, wrote a positive review for the album, and noted that Church is a "wise songwriter", but this "does not give him license to the lyrics and songs he crafts even though he sings these sorts of songs with more authority, or more vision, than his contemporaries".

Jody Rosen states that "Church's new album, The Outsiders, is, in keeping with the pattern, his best yet; it's also his most blustery, with the guitars and the outlaw swagger turned up, as the poet said, to eleven." Joseph Hudak of Country Weekly gave the album an A grade, saying that "[with] the terrifyingly creative The Outsiders [album], Eric Church pulls off what so many before him have tried: successfully merging the bedrock sounds of country music (plinking banjo, crying Dobro and a Hank Williams twang) with those of seemingly disparate genres like rock, heavy metal and especially R&B to create an utterly unique product." At Entertainment Weekly, Nick Catucci also grade the album an A, writing that "As with all of The Outsiders' thrills, it's both thumpingly obvious and exquisitely executed." Glenn Gamboa of Newsday graded the album a B+, stating that "Church consciously tries to move outside the mainstream again, looking to be more artistic." At American Songwriter, Jonathan Bernstein rated the album four stars out of five, saying that "Church gets to have it both ways on The Outsiders, writing several irresistible hits while boasting repeatedly to the press about the ten some-odd surefire number one singles he decided, alongside producer Jay Joyce, to not include on the album." Bernstein also wrote that "The Outsiders [album] is at its best when it lets the songs market themselves." At Spin, Michael Robbins rated the album a nine out of ten, commenting that "mostly, this is the kind of record critics imagine Kanye keeps making: a freakish statement of confidence and power from an artist in full command of his gifts."

PopMatters' Anthony Easton rated the album a seven out of a ten, stating that "Church is so good at the commercial that he will never be an outsider, but he also knows how well the safe outsider sells," and that the album is "not nearly as dangerous as he thinks it is," while concluding, "This might be cynicism, but pop music is as much about the sizzle as it is about the steak, and no one plays both ends against the middle as efficiently as Church." At AbsolutePunk, Gregory Robson rated the album an 85-percent, calling the album a "fine step forward" that has "its weak moments, [but] there's no denying that when Church swings for the fences, he absolutely knocks it out of the park. Defiant, undaunted and brimming with confidence, The Outsiders happily carries the banner of outlaw country." Dan MacIntosh of Roughstock rated the album four out of five stars, writing that the release "is best appreciated with a studied examination of its insides." At Music Is My Oxygen, Rob Burkhardt rated the album four-and-a-half stars out of five, writing that the releases "strong points far outweigh its flaws." Tara Toro of Got Country Online rated the album a perfect five stars, indicating how "The Outsiders takes you on a musically adventurous ride from first note to last." However, The Guardian's Dave Simpson rated the album three stars out of five and gave it a mixed review, cautioning that the music's "Dark Side intriguingly explores inner urges but ultimately descends into a desire to shoot the bad guys", which just happens to be "a microcosm of an album with a radical spirit but a conservative heart."

The album was nominated for Best Country Album at the 57th Annual Grammy Awards but lost to Miranda Lambert's Platinum. The album won the "International Album of the Year" award at the 2014 British Country Music Association awards.

== Commercial performance ==
The album sold 288,000 copies in the US during its first week of release, charting at number one on both the Billboard 200 and the Top Country Albums chart. It was Church's second #1 album, and the biggest selling debut-week for a country album since Luke Bryan's Crash My Party. In its second week, the album fell to number two, selling 74,000. The album was certified Gold by the RIAA on July 17, 2014. It became the best-selling country album of 2014 in the US, as well as the tenth best-selling album overall of 2014 in the US with 811,000 copies sold for the year. Sales of the album reached a million in July 2015, and has sold 1,240,200 copies in the US as of April 2017. It was certified double Platinum by the RIAA on April 29, 2019 for two million units in sales and streams.

The album also charted at number one on the Canadian Albums Chart, selling 18,000 copies in its first week. The album also reached number 38 in the mid-week official UK Albums Chart before officially charting at number 70 in the UK and number 70 in Scotland, becoming Church's first appearance on these charts.

== Track listing ==
All tracks are written by Eric Church, with additional co-writers as noted.

No.	Title	Writer(s)	Length
1.	"The Outsiders"	Casey Beathard	4:12
2.	"A Man Who Was Gonna Die Young"	Jeremy Spillman	3:13
3.	"Cold One"	Lynn Hutton; Jeff Hyde	3:25
4.	"Roller Coaster Ride"	Hyde; Ryan Tyndell	4:36
5.	"Talladega"	Luke Laird	4:22
6.	"Broke Record"	Hyde	3:29
7.	"Like a Wrecking Ball"	Beathard	3:18
8.	"That's Damn Rock & Roll"	Beathard; Michael P. Heeney	4:26
9.	"Dark Side"	Travis Meadows; Spillman	3:38
10.	"Devil, Devil" (5:28) (Prelude: "Prince of Darkness", 3:34)	Beathard; Monty Criswell	8:02
11.	"Give Me Back My Hometown"	Laird	4:12
12.	"The Joint"	Beathard	3:47
Total length:			50:42

== Personnel ==
- Roy Agee – trombone on "Cold One" and "The Joint"
- Eric Church – acoustic guitar, electric guitar, lead vocals
- J.T. Corenflos – electric guitar
- Joanna Cotten – background vocals
- Barry Green – trombone on "Cold One" and "The Joint"
- Jason Hall – background vocals
- Lee Hendricks – bass guitar, baritone guitar, percussion, background vocals
- Jeff Hyde – banjo, acoustic guitar, mandolin, background vocals
- Jay Joyce – baritone guitar, bass guitar, drums, electric guitar, white noise generator, omnichord, Hammond C-3 organ, percussion, piano, pump organ, sound effects, synth mandolin, background vocals, Wurlitzer
- Jason Sellers – background vocals
- Bryan Sutton – bass-banjo, bouzouki, slide dobro, dobro, 12-string acoustic guitar, acoustic guitar, mandolin, octave mandolin, percussion, piano
- Matthew Wheeler – background vocals
- Craig Wright – drums, percussion, background vocals

== Charts ==
=== Weekly charts ===
Chart (2014–15)	Peak position
Australian Albums (ARIA)	23
Australian Country Albums (ARIA)	3
Canadian Albums (Billboard)	1
US Billboard 200	1
US Top Country Albums (Billboard)	1

=== Decade-end charts ===
Chart (2010–2019)	Position
US Billboard 200	116
US Top Country Albums (Billboard)	13

=== Year-end charts ===
Chart (2014)	Position
Canadian Albums (Billboard)	48
US Billboard 200	13
US Top Country Albums (Billboard)	4
Chart (2015)	Position
US Billboard 200	35
US Top Country Albums (Billboard)	8
Chart (2017)	Position
US Top Country Albums (Billboard)	70

== Certifications ==
Region	Certification	Certified units/sales
Canada (Music Canada)	Platinum	80,000^{^}
United States (RIAA)	2× Platinum	2,000,000^{‡} / 1,240,200
^{^} Shipments figures based on certification alone.
