= Cold One =

Song by Eric Church

Single by Eric Church

from the album The Outsiders
- Released: June 2, 2014
- Recorded: 2013–14
- Genre: Country
- Length: 3:25
- Label: EMI Nashville
- Songwriter(s): Eric Church; Luke Hutton; Jeff Hyde
- Producer(s): Jay Joyce

Eric Church singles chronology
"Give Me Back My Hometown" (2014)	"Cold One" (2014)	"Talladega" (2014)

"Cold One" is a song co-written and recorded by American country music singer Eric Church. It was released in June 2014 as the third single from his 2014 album The Outsiders. The song was written by Church, Luke Hutton and Jeff Hyde.

== Content ==
The song is about a lost love, told from the male's perspective. He states that she took a beer from a twelve-pack that he was drinking at the time, and describes both the beer and her sudden departure as a "cold one". Near the end of the song, Jay Joyce performs a guitar solo.

== Critical reception ==
Will Hermes of Rolling Stone, in his review of The Outsiders, described the song as "a Little Feat-flavored swamprocker that wrings emotion out of a boozer's double-entendre and wedges nearly a minute of hot soloing into a three-minute tune." Matt Bjorke of Roughstock reviewed the single favorably: "'Cold One' tells a simple story but like the first two singles from The Outsiders… it has interesting sonic sounds permeating through its heart and that’s enough to make Eric Church continue to stand out amongst a sea of sameness that often is mainstream radio". Writing for National Public Radio, Ken Tucker stated that "One of the things I like about Church is that he plays with his image as much as his sound. In this one, he makes himself the butt of the joke — the guy getting dumped, 'one beer short of a 12-pack,' as he puts it. He's the dupe, a heartbroken rube. 'Cold One' starts like a terse bit of country-rock, but builds to a frenetic, old-fashioned country hoedown." Kevin John Coyne of Country Universe rated the song "A", praising the lyrical content as well: "The song is set up to be one of those 'drinkin’ in the sun anthems,' with a paint-by-numbers kinda country production to boot. Then a few lines in, the guy gets dumped by the cold one who left him 'one beer short of a 12-pack.' Then the band lets loose, in an odd and refreshing way…"

== Music video ==
The music video was directed by Peter Zavadil and premiered in August 2014.

== Chart performance ==
The song has sold 281,000 copies in the US as of September 2014.

=== Weekly charts ===
Chart (2014)	Peak position
Canada (Canadian Hot 100)	87
Canada Country (Billboard)	19
US Billboard Hot 100	88
US Country Airplay (Billboard)	20
US Hot Country Songs (Billboard)	20

=== Year-end charts ===
Chart (2014)	Position
US Country Airplay (Billboard)	73
US Hot Country Songs (Billboard)	69

== Certifications ==
Region	Certification	Certified units/sales
United States (RIAA)	Platinum	1,000,000^{‡}
^{‡} Sales+streaming figures based on certification alone.
