= Like Jesus Does =

Single by Eric Church

from the album Chief
- Released: January 28, 2013
- Recorded: 2011
- Genre: Country
- Length: 3:18
- Label: EMI Nashville
- Songwriters: Casey Beathard; Monty Criswell
- Producer: Jay Joyce

Eric Church singles chronology
"The Only Way I Know" (2012)	"Like Jesus Does" (2013)	"The Outsiders" (2013)

"Like Jesus Does" is a song written by Casey Beathard and Monty Criswell and recorded by American country music artist Eric Church. It was released in January 2013 as the fifth and final single from Church's 2011 album Chief. It was also his eighth consecutive single to be certified gold by the RIAA. It is the one of three songs on any of Church’s albums that he himself is not credited as a writer.

== Content ==
The song is a mid-tempo ballad in which the narrator says that his lover accepts his personality and "loves [him] like Jesus does".

== Critical reception ==
Giving it 3.5 stars out of 5, Billy Dukes of Taste of Country praised the lyrics and "vulnerability", but criticized the "plodding melody".

== Commercial performance ==
The song has sold 509,000 copies in the United States as of June 2013. It was certified Gold by the RIAA on June 13, 2013, and then Platinum on November 11, 2016 for a million units in sales and streams.

== Music video ==
"Like Jesus Does" was directed by John Peets premiered on CMT and GAC in February 2013.

== Chart performance ==
Chart (2013)	Peak position
Canada Hot 100 (Billboard)	56
Canada Country (Billboard)	5
US Billboard Hot 100	59
US Hot Country Songs (Billboard)	13
US Country Airplay (Billboard)	6

=== Year-end charts ===
Chart (2013)	Position
US Country Airplay (Billboard)	46
US Hot Country Songs (Billboard)	47

== Certifications ==
Region	Certification	Certified units/sales
Canada (Music Canada)	Gold	40,000^{*}
United States (RIAA)	Platinum	1,000,000^{‡} / 509,000
^{*} Sales figures based on certification alone.
