= The Outsiders (Eric Church song) =

Single by Eric Church

from the album The Outsiders
- Released: October 22, 2013
- Recorded: 2013
- Genre: Country rock; hard rock
- Length: 4:11
- Label: EMI Nashville
- Songwriters: Eric Church; Casey Beathard
- Producer: Jay Joyce

Eric Church singles chronology
| "Like Jesus Does" (2013) | "The Outsiders" (2013) | "Give Me Back My Hometown" (2014) |

"The Outsiders" is a song co-written and recorded by American country music singer Eric Church. It was released in October 2013 as the first single and title track from his 2014 album of the same name. Church wrote this song with Casey Beathard.

== History ==
Church told Taste of Country that “It’s a bit of a statement. I wanted to send a message with this album that it’s gonna be different, it’s gonna be another level". He also described it as a mix of Waylon Jennings and Metallica.

Church performed the song at the 2013 telecast of the Country Music Association awards.

== Critical reception ==
Giving it 3.5 stars out of 5, Will Hermes of Rolling Stone wrote that "doubles down on his hard-rock/hip-hop fixations with a song that opens on an unfuckwithable snarl-rap, ramps into a high-lonesome stadium chorus over a Southern-rock stomp, then feigns a Black Keys garage skronk before barreling into a prog-metal capper." It received 4.5 stars from Matt Bjorke of Roughstock, who wrote that it was "musically interesting" and that it should "give Eric Church enough of a buzzworthy launching point for his upcoming 2014 album".

== Commercial performance ==
On its first week, the song debuted (and peaked) on the Country Airplay chart at No. 25, which is Eric Church highest debut on the chart. The song entered the Hot Country Songs chart at No. 6, the highest leap in that chart since October 2012 when the chart's ranking methodology was modified to include sales and streaming. The song sold 81,000 copies on its debut, the best-selling country song of the week.

As of February 2014, the single has sold 466,000 downloads in the United States. It was certified Gold by the RIAA on December 17, 2014 for 500,000 units in sales.

== Charts ==
| Chart (2013–2014) | Peak position |
|---|---|
| Canada Hot 100 (Billboard) | 32 |
| Canada Country (Billboard) | 37 |
| US Billboard Hot 100 | 51 |
| US Hot Country Songs (Billboard) | 6 |
| US Country Airplay (Billboard) | 25 |

=== Year-end charts ===
| Chart (2013) | Position |
|---|---|
| US Hot Country Songs (Billboard) | 100 |

| Chart (2014) | Position |
|---|---|
| US Hot Country Songs (Billboard) | 86 |

== Certifications ==
| Region | Certification | Certified units/sales |
|---|---|---|
| United States (RIAA) | Platinum | 1,000,000^{‡} |
^{‡} Sales+streaming figures based on certification alone.
