= Eric Church =

American singer-songwriter (born 1977)

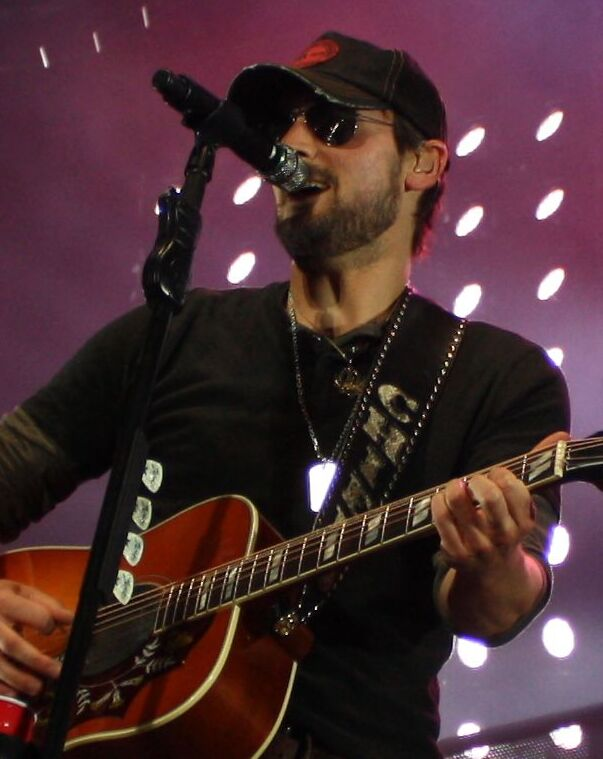
- Church in 2012
- Born: Kenneth Eric Church; May 3, 1977 (age 49); Granite Falls, North Carolina, U.S.
- Occupation: Singer-songwriter
- Years active: 2005–present
- Spouse: Katherine Blasingame (m. 2008)
- Children: 2
- Musical career
- Origin: Nashville, Tennessee, U.S.
- Genres: Country; country rock; Southern rock
- Instruments: Vocals; guitar
- Labels: Capitol Nashville; EMI Nashville; BigEC
- Website: ericchurch.com

Kenneth Eric Church (born May 3, 1977) is an American singer-songwriter and minority owner of the Charlotte Hornets. He has released seven studio albums through Capitol Nashville since 2005. His debut album, 2006's Sinners Like Me, produced three singles on the Billboard country charts including the top 20 hits "How 'Bout You", "Two Pink Lines", and "Guys Like Me".

His second album, 2009's Carolina, produced three more singles: "Smoke a Little Smoke" and his first top 10 hits, "Love Your Love the Most" and "Hell on the Heart". 2011's Chief, his first No. 1 album, gave him his first two No. 1 singles, "Drink in My Hand" and "Springsteen", and the hits "Homeboy", "Creepin'", and "Like Jesus Does". His third No. 1 single was "The Only Way I Know", which he, Jason Aldean, and Luke Bryan recorded for Aldean's album Night Train.

A fourth album, The Outsiders, was released in February 2014. It produced five new singles between 2013 and 2015 with the title track, "Give Me Back My Hometown", "Cold One", "Talladega" and "Like a Wrecking Ball". "Talladega" and "Give Me Back My Hometown" each reached number one on the Country Airplay chart. Church got his sixth No. 1 hit with Keith Urban in May 2015 with the single "Raise 'Em Up". His fifth studio album, Mr. Misunderstood, was released in November 2015 and went on to produce two number one singles with "Record Year" and "Round Here Buzz". In July 2018, Church released the first single and title track of his album Desperate Man, which was released in October of the same year. In 2021, Church released the triple album set Heart & Soul.

== Early life ==
Church was born on May 3, 1977, in Granite Falls, North Carolina, to Ken and Rita Church. Church worked with his father at Clayton Marcus, a furniture upholstery company where his father was president. At 13, he bought a guitar and began writing songs of his own. By his senior year of high school, he had found a gig at a local bar, which occupied most of his time. He played many Jimmy Buffett cover songs and a few of his own original songs in some dive bars. Some of those places were so rough that he got into a few altercations from the stage. For a few years, the band played often in bars and restaurants throughout North Carolina. The band "Mountain Boys" consisted of his college roommate, brother, and a fellow guitarist.

Before moving to Nashville, Church graduated from South Caldwell High School and then Appalachian State University with a degree in marketing.

== Career ==
=== 2006–2010: Sinners Like Me and Carolina ===
Church co-wrote Terri Clark's 2005 single "The World Needs a Drink", and the track "Whiskey Wings" on Dean Miller's 2005 album Platinum. He started recording with different producers. Capitol Nashville showed an interest and watched him perform but they were yet to be convinced enough to offer a recording contract. Autumn House-Tallant told HitQuarters that they did not think his music was "interesting" enough. The record company's attitude changed after he started working with producer Jay Joyce. Doyle states, "Eric scored a meeting with Nashville heavyweight Arthur Buenahora, a publisher at Sony Music who also signed Taylor Swift and Miranda Lambert. Church played him "Lightning", a ballad he wrote after watching the movie The Green Mile". (p. 5) The strong sound and direction the two forged together finally convinced Capitol Nashville that he was ready. His first single, "How 'Bout You" peaked at No. 14 on Hot Country Songs and led off his debut album Sinners Like Me. In April 2006, he performed on the Grand Ole Opry for the first time.

The album's other two singles, "Two Pink Lines" and "Guys Like Me", both reached the Top 20 as well. The fourth single, the title track, peaked at No. 51. An additional track from the album, "Lightning", was made into a music video despite not being released as a single. Church wrote the song shortly after moving to Nashville, inspired by the movie The Green Mile. Following the album's success, Church toured with Brad Paisley and Rascal Flatts. Church was fired from opening for Rascal Flatts after repeatedly performing for longer than his allotted time, despite repeated warnings. He was replaced by Taylor Swift, who was just starting her career. Before Swift started the tour, Church and Swift spoke, where he told Swift that she would thrive on the tour and joked that she should give him her first gold record as a thanks. Swift later did give him her first gold record with an attached note that said "Thanks for playing too long and too loud on the Flatts tour. I sincerely appreciate it. Taylor".

In 2008, Church released a fifth single, "His Kind of Money (My Kind of Love)" to country radio. It debuted on the Billboard Hot Country Songs chart at No. 55 in early 2008, and reached its peak of No. 46 in August. Originally slated as the lead single to an upcoming second album, "His Kind of Money" was instead included as a bonus track on albums sold at Best Buy. Following this song was "Love Your Love the Most", which debuted in early 2009 and was the first single from his second album Carolina, released in stores on March 24, 2009. The night before the official release, Church and Capitol Records distributed copies of the album on the campus of Church's alma mater, Appalachian State University, during a "release party" concert. As with his debut album, Carolina was produced by Jay Joyce, and is entirely composed of songs that he co-wrote. "Love Your Love the Most" brought Church to the top 10 for the very first time, peaking at No. 10 in September 2009. The album's second single, "Hell on the Heart", debuted in October 2009 and would also hit the top 10 in May 2010. The third single from "Carolina" was "Smoke a Little Smoke". In June 2010, Church moved to Capitol Nashville's new imprint EMI Records Nashville, becoming their second artist. On January 14, 2011, he released a four-song EP entitled Caldwell County.

=== 2011–2015: Chief and The Outsiders ===
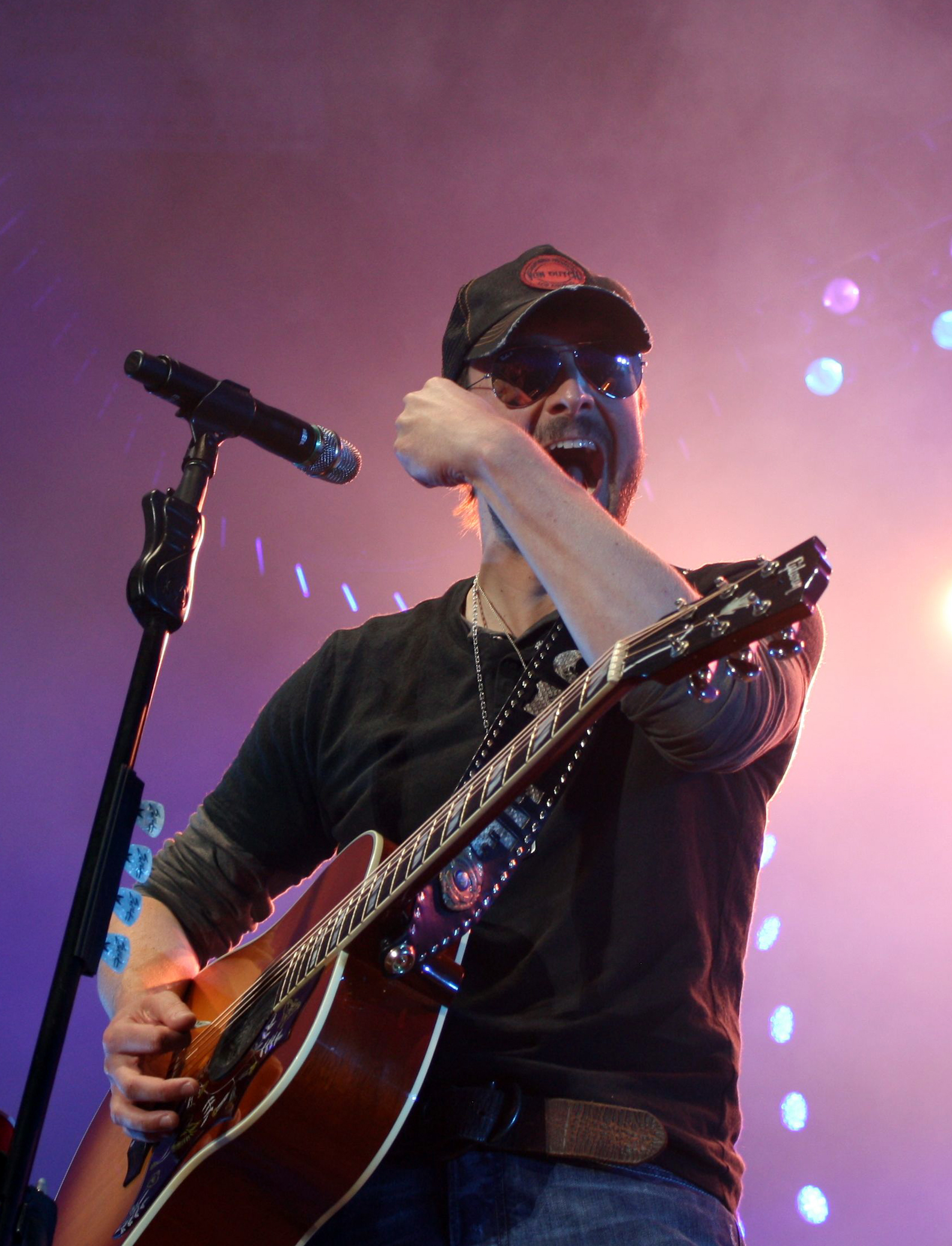
Church performing live at GNA's Countryfest at the Times Union Center, Albany, New York, July 7, 2012

Church released "Homeboy" to country radio in early 2011. The album Chief, produced by Jay Joyce, was released July 26, 2011, debuting at No. 1 on both Top Country Albums and the Billboard 200. The album sold 145,000 copies in its first week. On November 30, 2011, Chief was announced as a nominee for the 2012 Grammy Awards for Best Country Album. In January 2012 "Drink in My Hand" became his first No. 1 single. In February 2012, "Springsteen" was released as the third single from Chief. In an interview with American Songwriter, Church stated that the song was about "a love affair that takes place in an amphitheater between two people. It didn't happen with Springsteen, ironically, it happened with another artist." The song went on to become a No. 1 country hit, as well as his first Top 20 single on the Billboard Hot 100. The album's fourth single, "Creepin'", was released to country radio on July 16, 2012. Church lent his vocals for a song titled, "The Only Way I Know", with Jason Aldean along Luke Bryan. This song appears on Aldean's album Night Train, from which it was released as the second single. The fifth single from Chief, "Like Jesus Does", was released in January 2013 and peaked at number six on Country Airplay chart in June 2013.

In September 2012, Church announced that he planned to release his first live album in 2013, containing recordings of performances at the Tivoli Theatre in Chattanooga, Tennessee, on October 8 and 9, 2012. On February 8, the live album's title was announced as Caught in the Act, with a release date set for April 9. Church has stated he plans to take some time off from music in 2013 to focus on his songwriting and musical direction. At the 2012 CMA Awards in November, Church's album Chief won Album of the Year. In November it was announced that Church would co-headline Kenny Chesney's No Shoes Nation Tour alongside Chesney, Zac Brown Band, and Eli Young Band. In December, Eric was honored as one of the CMT Artists of the Year Awards. His award was presented by Kid Rock and he received a video message of congratulations from Metallica's James Hetfield.

On October 22, 2013, Church released a new single titled "The Outsiders". His fourth studio album, also titled The Outsiders, was released on February 11, 2014. This album, as with Church's previous three, was produced by Jay Joyce and released on the EMI Records Nashville label. It was followed in January 2014 by "Give Me Back My Hometown". This single reached number one on the Country Airplay chart, becoming his fourth overall. The third single, "Cold One", was released in June 2014, followed by "Talladega" in September. The latter reached number one on the Country Airplay chart in February 2015. The fifth single, "Like a Wrecking Ball", was released to country radio on March 9, 2015.

=== 2015–2018: Mr. Misunderstood and Desperate Man ===
On November 3, 2015, Church's new surprise album, Mr. Misunderstood, arrived in the mailboxes of his fan club members. The album became available to the public on iTunes the following day. The album was released as a surprise with no fanfare and no promotional advertisements. It was produced by Jay Joyce and executive producer Arturo Buenahora Jr. The first single, the title track, was released to radio on November 9, 2015. The first live performance and debut of the track was at the 2015 CMA Awards. The song peaked at No. 15 on the airplay chart on February 6, 2016. "Record Year" is the album's second single. The album's final track, "Three Year Old", pays tribute to all the lessons Church has learned from his three-year-old son, who was also credited with naming Church's guitar "ButterBean". Church used "ButterBean" for the creation of the album. Mr. Misunderstood was nominated for Album of the Year at the 2016 ACM Awards and the title track was nominated for Video of the Year. Mr. Misunderstood features ten self-written and co-written tracks and features themes of independence, lessons learned, and loyalty. The album was recorded by Jason Hall at St. Charles in Nashville. In March 2016, "Record Year" was released to radio; it reached No. 1 on the Country Airplay in August 2016. The album's third single, "Kill a Word" released to country radio on August 29, 2016. Church was selected as one of 30 artists to perform on "Forever Country", a mash-up track of "Take Me Home, Country Roads", "On the Road Again" and "I Will Always Love You" which celebrates 50 years of the CMA Awards.

Church played his biggest solo tour to date with his Holdin' My Own Tour that featured 62 shows in 61 cities from January through May 2017. The tour was capped off by two sold-out shows at Nashville's Bridgestone Arena, with the Friday night show breaking the arena's capacity record before being one-upped by the Saturday night show which set of record of 19,020 attendees. On October 4, 2017, Church debuted a song he had written for Sonny Melton, who died in the Las Vegas shooting tragedy. The song, called "Why Not Me", was performed at the Grand Ole Opry in Nashville. In November 2017 Church released a limited run vinyl box set titled 61 Days in Church that would be released in monthly stages through 2018. The collection includes 124 tracks all of which were recorded live at the 61 shows of his 2017 Holdin' My Own Tour. The set includes two songs from each concert of the tour with the exception of the final two Nashville shows, which feature three songs from each night. He had already began releasing the album in stages for free on digital streaming services in September 2017. On July 12, 2018, Church announced via social media that he would release his sixth album, Desperate Man, on October 5, 2018. He released the album's first single and title track the following day.

=== 2020–2022: Heart & Soul ===
On June 25, 2020, Church released the lead single from his upcoming seventh studio album, "Stick That in Your Country Song". The song debuted at number 22 on the Country Airplay chart, Church's highest debut to date. It would go on to be nominated for the Grammy Award for Best Country Solo Performance. On November 9, 2020, Church released the second official single, "Hell of a View", which topped the Country Airplay charts. On November 11, 2020, Church won the Entertainer of the Year award at the 54th Annual Country Music Association Awards. He performed "The Star-Spangled Banner" alongside Jazmine Sullivan at Super Bowl LV. On January 21, 2021, Church announced his seventh studio album, Heart & Soul, would be a triple album, and would be released in April 2021. Prior to the album's release, several promotional singles from each albums were released including, "Crazyland" and "Never Break Heart" from Heart, "Bad Mother Trucker", "Lynyrd Skynyrd Jones", and "Break It Kind of Guy" from Soul. "Through My Ray-Bans" was released as a promotional single from &, and was succeeded by the only official single from &, "Doing Life With Me". On April 16, 2021, Church released the first album of the triple set, Heart, followed by the album &, (physical vinyl exclusive to the Church Choir members; released to streaming in August 2022) on April 20, and the third and final album of the triple set, Soul, on April 23. The triple-album release contains 24 songs in total, including the singles "Heart on Fire", from Heart, and "Doing Life With Me", from &, along with the previously released singles and promotional singles. In October 2021, after two of his bandmates tested positive for COVID-19, Church performed two solo concerts on his The Gather Again Tour. The solo shows were in Pittsburgh on October 8 and Philadelphia on October 9. On February 22, 2022, Church was announced to perform at the 57th Academy of Country Music Awards on March 7, 2022.

=== 2024–present: Evangeline vs. the Machine ===
On October 4, 2024, Church released the song "Darkest Hour", his first solo performance in three years. He had already written the song before Hurricane Helene and intended to release it in 2025, but because the lyrics fit with the serious damage the storm caused to his home state of North Carolina, and the efforts to help, Church said it "didn't feel right to wait with this song." Church helped directly with the recovery and promised all publishing royalties would go to help the state. Church and Luke Combs put together the "Concert for Carolina" on October 26, 2024, at Bank of America Stadium in Charlotte, North Carolina, which raised over $24 million for Hurricane Helene relief. Church performed the song at the 58th Annual Country Music Association Awards.

On March 17, 2025, Church announced his first single from his eighth studio album, "Hands of Time", releasing three days later on March 20, 2025. The same day, Church announced his eighth studio album, Evangeline vs. the Machine to release on May 2, 2025. On April 29, 2025, Church teased the second track from the album, "Bleed on Paper", across his social media. The next day, on April 30, Church announced his upcoming "Free the Machine" tour. The album was released on May 2, 2025. On May 16, 2025, Morgan Wallen released his fourth studio album, I'm the Problem, and subsequently the song "Number 3 and Number 7" featuring Eric Church. This marks their second collaboration following "Man Made a Bar" in 2023.

== Personal life ==
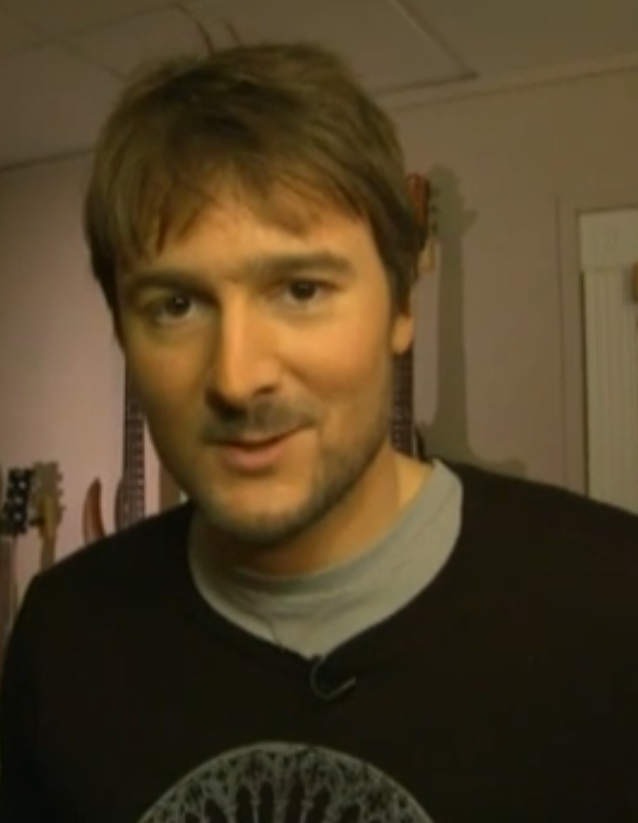
Church in 2012

Church was raised in a family of Baptists, which he called "the religion of contradictions" in 2008. His music continues to reflect Christian themes; for example, his song "Old Testament Me" (2017) centers on the Bible's "turn the other cheek" teaching. In 2025, he stated, "Faith's a big part of my life and it's always been a part of my life".

On January 8, 2008, Church married music publisher Katherine Blasingame at Westglow Resort in Blowing Rock, North Carolina. At the wedding, Church performed "You Make It Look So Easy", a song he wrote for Blasingame. On October 3, 2011, their first son, Boone McCoy Church, was born; he is the subject of Church's song "Three Year Old". On February 15, 2015, their second son, Tennessee Hawkins "Hawk" Church was born. Their home (along with Church's "man cave"), located in Nashville, was featured in an episode of CMT's Cribs.

The Chief Cares Fund is a foundation organized by Eric and Katherine Church in 2013. The non-profit organization has been used to help underprivileged families in Tennessee, North Carolina, and even as far as helping orphans in Nepal receive clothing, proper bedding, and schooling. The foundation has also delivered Bibles to Haiti and helps fund Humane Society no-kill animal shelters. Donations are made via the foundation's website and through Chief Cares Platinum Ticket purchases.

In November 2022, North Carolina Governor Roy Cooper awarded Church the North Carolina Award, the state's highest civilian honor.

Church wears his signature aviator sunglasses as a result of wearing contact lenses. At the beginning of his career, he was forced to deal with the heat from the stage lights drying out his contacts. As he began performing in larger venues, his aviators and Von Dutch denim trucker hat became his trademark.

Church has become an advocate for the use of cannabis, reflected in songs such as "Smoke a Little Smoke"; at the time of that song's release, Church's record label urged him not to release the song, though it had minor success as a single. Church has also referenced marijuana use in other songs like "The Joint" and "I'm Gettin' Stoned", and was the subject of a marijuana joke at the 49th ACM Awards where Blake Shelton and Luke Bryan referred to Eric Church as the Willie Nelson for the new-country generation and compared Eric Church's dressing room to a cannabis dispensary.

Church opened Chief's, a bar, restaurant, and performance venue in downtown Nashville in April 2024.

== Musical styles ==
Church's style has been described as country rock, outlaw country, and southern rock. Church's influences include Hank Williams Jr., Merle Haggard, Little Feat, The Band, Kris Kristofferson, The Grateful Dead, Ray Wylie Hubbard and Waylon Jennings. Church has also said that many hard rock and heavy metal bands influenced his music, including Metallica and AC/DC.

== Discography ==
Studio albums

- Sinners Like Me (2006)
- Carolina (2009)
- Chief (2011)
- The Outsiders (2014)
- Mr. Misunderstood (2015)
- Desperate Man (2018)
- Heart & Soul (2021)
- Evangeline vs. the Machine (2025)

== Tours ==
Headlining

- Jägermeister Country Tour (2010)
- Blood, Sweat and Beers Tour (2012–13)
- The Outsiders World Tour (2014–15)
- Holdin' My Own Tour (2017)
- Double Down Tour (2019)
- Gather Again Tour (2021–22)
- Outsiders Revival Tour (2023)
- Free the Machine Tour (2025–26)

Supporting

- Me and My Gang Tour (2006) with Rascal Flatts
- Rowdy Friends Tours (2010) with Hank Williams Jr
- CMT Revolution Tour (2010) with Miranda Lambert
- Roadside Bars and Pink Guitars (2010) with Miranda Lambert
- My Kinda Party Tour (2011) with Jason Aldean
- Locked and Loaded Tour (2011) with Toby Keith
- No Shoes Nation Tour (2013) with Kenny Chesney
- Locked and Reloaded Tour (2013) with Dierks Bentley and Miranda Lambert

=== Band members ===
Current members

- Eric Church – lead vocals, rhythm guitar, acoustic guitar, banjo, piano
- Driver Williams – lead guitar, rhythm guitar
- Jeff Cease – rhythm guitar, lead guitar
- Jeff Hyde – acoustic guitar, banjo, background vocals
- Lee Hendricks – bass guitar
- Craig Wright – drums
- Jay Joyce – production
- Joanna Cotten - vocals (2013–2022)(2025 - current)

== Awards and nominations ==
Awards	Year	Nominee/Work	Category	Result	Ref
ACM Awards	2011	Eric Church	Top New Solo Vocalist	Won	
ACM Awards	2012	Chief	Album of the Year	Nominated	
ACM Awards	2012	"Homeboy"	Video of the Year	Nominated	
ACM Awards	2013	Eric Church	Male Vocalist of the Year	Nominated	
ACM Awards	2013	Chief	Album of the Year	Won	
ACM Awards	2013	"Springsteen"	Single of the Year	Nominated	
ACM Awards	2013	"Springsteen"	Song of the Year (songwriting with Jeff Hyde and Ryan Tyndell)	Nominated	
ACM Awards	2013	"Creepin'"	Music Video of the Year	Nominated	
ACM Awards	2013	"The Only Way I Know" (with Jason Aldean and Luke Bryan)	Vocal Event of the Year	Won	
ACM Awards	2014	Eric Church	Male Vocalist of the Year	Nominated	
ACM Awards	2015	Eric Church	Jim Reeves International Award	Won	
ACM Awards	2015	Eric Church	Male Vocalist of the Year	Nominated	
ACM Awards	2015	The Outsiders	Album of the Year	Nominated	
ACM Awards	2015	"Give Me Back My Hometown"	Song of the Year (songwriting with Luke Laird)	Nominated	
ACM Awards	2016	Eric Church	Entertainer of the Year	Nominated	
ACM Awards	2016	Eric Church	Male Vocalist of the Year	Nominated	
ACM Awards	2016	Mr. Misunderstood	Album of the Year	Nominated	
ACM Awards	2016	"Mr. Misunderstood"	Video of the Year	Won	
ACM Awards	2016	Raise 'Em Up (with Keith Urban)	Vocal Event of the Year	Nominated	
ACM Awards	2016	Raise 'Em Up (with Keith Urban)	Single Record of the Year	Nominated	
ACM Awards	2017	"Kill a Word" (featuring Rhiannon Giddens)	Song of the Year	Nominated	
ACM Awards	2017	Eric Church	Merle Haggard Spirit Award	Won	
ACM Awards	2019	Desperate Man	Album of the Year	Nominated	
ACM Awards	2020	Eric Church	Entertainer of the Year	Nominated	
ACM Awards	2020	"Some of It"	Song of the Year	Nominated	
ACM Awards	2021	Eric Church	Entertainer of the Year	Nominated	
ACM Awards	2021	Eric Church	Male Artist of the Year	Nominated	
American Country Awards	2012	Eric Church	Artist of the Year: Male	Nominated	
American Country Awards	2012	Eric Church	Touring Artist of the Year	Nominated	
American Country Awards	2012	"Drink in My Hand"	Single of the Year	Nominated	
American Country Awards	2012	"Drink in My Hand"	Single of the Year: Male	Nominated	
American Country Awards	2012	Chief	Album of the Year	Nominated	
American Country Awards	2012	"Springsteen"	Song of the Year (songwriting with Jeff Hyde and Ryan Tyndell)	Won	
American Music Awards	2012	Eric Church	Favorite Country Male Artist	Nominated	
American Music Awards	2014	The Outsiders	Favorite Country Album	Nominated	
Billboard Music Awards	2013	"Springsteen"	Top Country Song	Nominated	
Billboard Music Awards	2017	"Kill A Word" (featuring Rhiannon Giddens)	Top Country Collaboration	Nominated	
CMT Music Awards	2013	"Springsteen"	Video of the Year	Nominated	
CMT Music Awards	2013	"Creepin'"	Male Video of the Year	Nominated	
CMT Music Awards	2013	"The Only Way I Know" (with Jason Aldean and Luke Bryan)	Collaborative Video of the Year	Won	
CMT Music Awards	2013	"Homeboy"	CMT Performance of the Year	Nominated	
CMT Music Awards	2017	"Record Year"	Male Video of the Year	Nominated	
CMT Music Awards	2019	"Desperate Man"	Male Video of the Year	Nominated	
CMA Awards	2011	Eric Church	New Artist of the Year	Nominated	
CMA Awards	2012	Eric Church	Male Vocalist of the Year	Nominated	
CMA Awards	2012	Chief	Album of the Year	Won	
CMA Awards	2012	"Springsteen"	Single of the Year	Nominated	
CMA Awards	2012	"Springsteen"	Song of the Year (songwriting with Jeff Hyde and Ryan Tyndell)	Nominated	
CMA Awards	2012	"Springsteen"	Music Video of the Year	Nominated	
CMA Awards	2013	Eric Church	Male Vocalist of the Year	Nominated	
CMA Awards	2013	"The Only Way I Know" (with Jason Aldean and Luke Bryan)	Musical Event of the Year	Nominated	
CMA Awards	2014	Eric Church	Male of the Year	Nominated	
CMA Awards	2014	The Outsiders	Album of the Year	Nominated	
CMA Awards	2014	"Give Me Back My Hometown"	Song of the Year (songwriting with Luke Laird)	Nominated	
CMA Awards	2014	"Give Me Back My Hometown"	Single of the Year	Nominated	
CMA Awards	2015	Eric Church	Entertainer of the Year	Nominated	
CMA Awards	2015	Eric Church	Male Vocalist of the Year	Nominated	
CMA Awards	2015	"Talladega"	Single of the Year	Nominated	
CMA Awards	2015	"Like a Wrecking Ball"	Song of the Year (songwriting with Casey Beathard)	Nominated	
CMA Awards	2015	"Raise 'Em Up" (with Keith Urban)	Musical Event of the Year	Won	
CMA Awards	2016	Eric Church	Male Vocalist of the Year	Nominated	
CMA Awards	2016	"Record Year"	Music Video of the Year (directed by John Peets, Reid Long)	Nominated	
CMA Awards	2016	"Record Year"	Single of the Year	Nominated	
CMA Awards	2016	"Record Year"	Song of the Year (songwriting with Jeff Hyde, Eric Church)	Nominated	
CMA Awards	2016	Mr. Misunderstood	Album of the Year	Won	
CMA Awards	2017	Eric Church	Entertainer of the Year	Nominated	
CMA Awards	2017	Eric Church	Male Vocalist of the Year	Nominated	
CMA Awards	2017	"Kill A Word" (featuring Rhiannon Giddens)	Musical Event of the Year	Nominated	
CMA Awards	2019	Eric Church	Entertainer of the Year	Nominated	
CMA Awards	2019	Desperate Man	Album of the Year	Nominated	
CMA Awards	2019	"Some of It"	Music Video of the Year	Nominated	
CMA Awards	2020	Eric Church	Entertainer of the Year	Won	
CMA Awards	2020	Eric Church	Male Vocalist of the Year	Nominated	
Grammy Awards	2012	Chief	Best Country Album	Nominated	
Grammy Awards	2013	"Springsteen"	Best Country Solo Performance	Nominated	
Grammy Awards	2013	"Springsteen"	Best Country Song (songwriting with Jeff Hyde and Ryan Tyndell)	Nominated	
Grammy Awards	2015	"Give Me Back My Hometown"	Best Country Solo Performance	Nominated	
Grammy Awards	2015	"Give Me Back My Hometown"	Best Country Song (songwriting with Luke Laird)	Nominated	
Grammy Awards	2015	"Raise 'Em Up" (with Keith Urban)	Best Country Duo/Group Performance	Nominated	
Grammy Awards	2015	The Outsiders	Best Country Album	Nominated	
Grammy Awards	2020	Desperate Man	Best Country Album	Nominated	
Grammy Awards	2020	"Some of It"	Best Country Song	Nominated	
Grammy Awards	2021	"Stick That in Your Country Song"	Best Country Solo Performance	Nominated	
Grammy Awards	2026	Evangeline vs. the Machine	Best Contemporary Country Album	Nominated	
