= Raise 'Em Up =

2015 song by Keith Urban and Eric Church

Single by Keith Urban featuring Eric Church

from the album Fuse
- Released: 26 January 2015
- Recorded: 2013
- Genre: Country
- Length: 3:04
- Label: Hit Red; Capitol Nashville
- Songwriters: Tom Douglas; Jaren Johnston; Jeffrey Steele
- Producers: Keith Urban; Nathan Chapman

Keith Urban singles chronology
"Somewhere in My Car" (2014)	"Raise 'Em Up" (2015)	"John Cougar, John Deere, John 3:16" (2015)

Eric Church singles chronology
"Talladega" (2014)	"Raise 'Em Up" (2015)	"Like a Wrecking Ball" (2015)

"Raise 'Em Up" is a song written by Tom Douglas, Jaren Johnston and Jeffrey Steele and recorded by Australian country music singer Keith Urban as a duet with American country music singer Eric Church. It was released in January 2015 as the fifth international single, sixth overall and final single from Urban's 2013 album Fuse.

== Background ==
According to Urban, when he sent a demo to Church with the intent of having him serve as a duet partner on it, Church asked, "How do you write a song as good as that?" and Urban replied that he did not write the song. Regarding his own reaction to hearing the demo, Urban said that "I was floored" and added, "There’s so much imagery in the song and it’s written in such a way that you can fill in all the blanks. I love that kind of style of songwriting".

== Content ==
The song is a mid-tempo country song speaking about various objects being "raise[d]" up, such as lighters at a concert, "raising one's voice", and raising children.

== Critical reception ==
Billy Dukes of Taste of Country reviewed the single favorably, saying that "In barely three minutes, Urban’s new single from ‘Fuse’ goes from a wild weekend to raising kids, all while hinting at the preciousness of time. Rarely is so much said in so little time with so much efficiency and emotion."

The song was nominated for Best Country Duo/Group Performance at the 57th Annual Grammy Awards.

== Chart performance ==
As of June 2015, the song had sold 250,000 copies in the US. On August 16, 2019, the single was certified gold by the Recording Industry Association of America (RIAA) for combined sales and streaming data of over 500,000 units in the United States.

== Music video ==
The music video is in black-and-white, and was directed by Chris Hicky and premiered in April 2015.

== Personnel ==
From Fuse liner notes.

- Nathan Chapman — programming, bass guitar, keyboards, background vocals
- Eric Church — lead vocals
- Keith Urban — all vocals, electric guitar, acoustic guitar

== Charts ==
=== Weekly charts ===
Chart (2015)	Peak position
Canada (Canadian Hot 100)	47
Canada Country (Billboard)	1
US Billboard Hot 100	56
US Country Airplay (Billboard)	1
US Hot Country Songs (Billboard)	8

=== Year-end charts ===
Chart (2015)	Position
US Country Airplay (Billboard)	44
US Hot Country Songs (Billboard)	55

== Certifications ==
Region	Certification	Certified units/sales
United States (RIAA)	Gold	500,000^{‡}
^{‡} Sales+streaming figures based on certification alone.
