= Casey Beathard =

American country music songwriter (born 1965)

- Born: Casey Michael Beathard; December 2, 1965 (age 60)
- Origin: Torrance, California, U.S. Spring Hill, Tennessee, U.S.
- Genre: Country
- Occupation: Songwriter
- Years active: 1998–present

Casey Michael Beathard (/ˈbɛθərd/ BETH-ərd; born December 2, 1965) is an American country music songwriter. The son of former National Football League general manager Bobby Beathard, and father of former NFL quarterback C. J. Beathard, and country music artist Tucker Beathard, he has co-written singles for several country music recording artists, including top-ten singles for Gary Allan, Billy Ray Cyrus, Trace Adkins, Kenny Chesney, and Eric Church.

In 2004 and 2008, he received Broadcast Music, Inc.'s Songwriter of the Year award for his contributions.

== Early life and education ==
Beathard was born on December 2, 1965, in Torrance, California. He attended Oakton High School in Vienna, Virginia, where he played football and graduated in 1984. In 1990, Beathard graduated from Elon University in Elon, North Carolina, with a degree in business management. While in Elon, he was a member of Kappa Sigma fraternity and played college football.

== Career ==
In 1991, Beathard moved to Nashville, Tennessee, to find work as a songwriter. After finding work at various jobs in Nashville, he was eventually signed to a songwriting contract; his first cut as a songwriter was the title track of Kenny Chesney's 1998 album I Will Stand, which was released as a single that year. (Chesney later recorded "No Shoes, No Shirt, No Problems", another Beathard co-write, in 2002.) By the 2000s, many other country music artists had recorded Beathard's material, including Trace Adkins, Gary Allan, Tracy Byrd, and Billy Currington. For his contributions as a songwriter, Beathard received a Songwriter of the Year award from Broadcast Music Incorporated in 2004 and 2008.

In 2006, he received his first credit as a record producer, when he co-produced the track "I Wanna Feel Something" on Trace Adkins' Dangerous Man album. This was also Adkins' first co-production credit.

A year later, Beathard received additional honors from BMI as the co-writer of Tracy Lawrence's single "Find Out Who Your Friends Are", Lawrence's first number one in eleven years, and the first single for his personal Rocky Comfort label.

Beathard's son, C. J. Beathard, is a backup quarterback for the Jacksonville Jaguars. He played at the University of Iowa and was drafted by the San Francisco 49ers in the 2017 NFL draft. Another son, Tucker Beathard, is signed to Dot Records as a recording artist.

His son Clayton, a quarterback at Long Island University, was fatally stabbed during an altercation that began on December 21, 2019, outside of the Dogwood Bar & Grill in Nashville.

== Themes ==
Several of Casey Beathard's songs are up-tempo party anthems, occasionally centering on alcoholic beverages. The latter theme is most evident on the three cuts recorded by Byrd—"Ten Rounds with Jose Cuervo", "Drinkin' Bone", and "How'd I Wind Up in Jamaica"—as well as Trent Willmon's debut single "Beer Man", and "The World Needs a Drink" by Terri Clark. He has occasionally shown a more serious side to his songs as well, such as Jeff Bates's "The Love Song", Billy Currington's "Walk a Little Straighter", Billy Ray Cyrus's "Ready, Set, Don't Go", Eric Church's "Homeboy", and more recently for Kip Moore's 2025 "Bad Spot".

== Singles ==
Song title	Artist	Co-writers	Peak	Release date
"Heaven on Dirt"	Gord Bamford	Jason Lee Owens Jr., Phil O'Donnell, Jenee Fleenor	34	04/16/2021
"Hell of a View"	Eric Church	Eric Church, Monty Criswell	4	11/09/2020
"Rock On"	Tucker Beathard	Tucker Beathard, Marla Cannon-Goodman	2	03/06/2016
"Like a Wrecking Ball"	Eric Church	Eric Church	6	03/09/2015
"The Outsiders"	Eric Church	Eric Church	6	10/22/2013
"Like Jesus Does"	Eric Church	Monty Criswell	6	1/28/2013
"He's Mine"	Rodney Atkins	Tim James, Phil O'Donnell	23	11/7/2011
"Just Fishin'"	Trace Adkins	Ed Hill, Monty Criswell	6	3/21/2011
"Homeboy"	Eric Church	Eric Church	13	2/28/2011
"Brown Chicken Brown Cow"	Trace Adkins	Kenny Beard, Rivers Rutherford	39	8/17/2010
"The Boys of Fall"	Kenny Chesney	Dave Turnbull	1	7/12/2010
"The Breath You Take"	George Strait	Dean Dillon, Jessie Jo Dillon	6	7/12/2010
"Come Back Song"	Darius Rucker	Chris Stapleton, Darius Rucker	1	7/6/2010
"Way Out Here"	Josh Thompson	Josh Thompson, David Lee Murphy	15	3/29/2010
"All I Ask For Anymore"	Trace Adkins	Tim James	14	5/18/2009
"His Kind of Money (My Kind of Love)"	Eric Church	Eric Church, Shane Minor	46	3/24/2009
"Cleaning This Gun (Come On In Boy)"	Rodney Atkins	Marla-Cannon Goodman	1	10/1/2007
"Don't Blink"	Kenny Chesney	Chris Wallin	1	9/10/2007
"How 'bout Them Cowgirls"	George Strait	Ed Hill	3	8/24/2007
"Ready, Set, Don't Go"	Billy Ray Cyrus w/ Miley Cyrus	Billy Ray Cyrus	4	8/11/2007
"'Fore She Was Mama"	Clay Walker	Phil O'Donnell	21	10/16/2006
"The World Needs a Drink"	Terri Clark	Eric Church	26	8/29/2006
"Find Out Who Your Friends Are"	Tracy Lawrence	Ed Hill	1	8/21/2006
"Yee Haw"	Jake Owen	Jake Owen, Kendell Marvel	16	2/27/2006
"Do You Want Fries with That"	Tim McGraw	Kerry Kurt Phillips	5	5/23/2005
"I See Me"	Travis Tritt	Chris Mohr	32	3/5/2005
"I Got A Feelin'"	Billy Currington	Billy Currington, Carson Chamberlain	5	1/5/2004
"Hot Mama"	Trace Adkins	Tom Shapiro	5	9/22/2003
"Drinkin' Bone"	Tracy Byrd	Kerry Kurt Phillips	7	8/4/2003
"No Shoes, No Shirt, No Problems"	Kenny Chesney		2	5/26/2003
"Walk a Little Straighter"	Billy Currington	Billy Currington, Carson Chamberlain	8	4/21/2003
"The Love Song"	Jeff Bates	Jeff Bates, Kenny Beard	8	12/16/2002
"Ten Rounds with Jose Cuervo"	Tracy Byrd	Michael P. Heeney, Marla Cannon-Goodman	1	4/1/2002
"Where the Stars and Stripes and the Eagle Fly"	Aaron Tippin	Aaron Tippin, Kenny Beard	2	9/17/2001
"Right Where I Need to Be"	Gary Allan	Kendell Marvel	5	9/11/2000
"I Will Stand"	Kenny Chesney	Mark Germino	27	8/25/1998
