= Like a Wrecking Ball =

Single by Eric Church

from the album The Outsiders
- Released: March 9, 2015
- Recorded: 2013–14
- Genre: Country rock
- Length: 3:18
- Label: EMI Nashville
- Songwriters: Eric Church; Casey Beathard
- Producer: Jay Joyce

Eric Church singles chronology
"Raise 'Em Up" (2015)	"Like a Wrecking Ball" (2015)	"Mr. Misunderstood" (2015)

"Like a Wrecking Ball" is a song co-written and recorded by American country music artist Eric Church. It was released on March 9, 2015 as the fifth and final single from his 2014 album The Outsiders. Church wrote this song with Casey Beathard.

== Background ==
Church once told a crowd during a show that "[the song is] about [...] sex".

== Critical reception ==
In regards to the "physicality" of the lyrics, Billy Dukes of Taste of Country said, "To be certain, this is a non-traditional babymaker from country music's least likely Romeo. And that's why it works. "Like a Wrecking Ball" silences Church's crowd when he includes it between two more guitar-driven numbers at concerts. It's a unified moment of "Whoa!" Kevin John Coyne of Country Universe gave the song an "A" grade, praising the production and comparing the song to Dwight Yoakam's "Nothing", writing that "'Like a Wrecking Ball' sounds like nothing on the radio today" and pointing out "Irregular rhythms, a vocal sung out of the corner of his mouth, and a lyric that makes every other love song out there sound like child's play" and describing the song as "[a]n instant contender for the best single of 2015."

== Commercial response ==
"Like a Wrecking Ball" debuted on the U.S. Billboard Country Airplay and Hot Country Songs charts at numbers 55 and 44, respectively, for charts dated March 7, 2015. It entered the Billboard Hot 100 at No. 100 for the week of April 11, 2015. The song peaked at No. 52 on the Hot 100 for the chart dated July 25, 2015. It peaked at number 6 on the Billboard Hot Country Songs chart. As of November 2015, the song has sold 1,026,000 copies in the United States. The song was certified triple Platinum by the RIAA on July 15, 2022 for three million units in sales and streams.

== Music video ==
The accompanying music video for this was directed by Joe DeMaio and premiered in June 2015. It is composed of live footage that was shot during the 2015 CMT Music Awards.

== Chart performance ==
=== Weekly charts ===
Chart (2015)	Peak position
Canada Hot 100 (Billboard)	75
Canada Country (Billboard)	32
US Billboard Hot 100	51
US Country Airplay (Billboard)	11
US Hot Country Songs (Billboard)	6

=== Year-end charts ===
Chart (2015)	Position
US Country Airplay (Billboard)	53
US Hot Country Songs (Billboard)	10

== Certifications ==
Region	Certification	Certified units/sales
United States (RIAA)	3× Platinum	3,000,000^{‡}
^{‡} Sales+streaming figures based on certification alone.
