= Give Me Back My Hometown =

Single by Eric Church

from the album The Outsiders
- Released: January 10, 2014
- Recorded: 2013
- Genre: Country
- Length: 4:12
- Label: EMI Nashville
- Songwriters: Eric Church; Luke Laird
- Producer: Jay Joyce

Eric Church singles chronology
"The Outsiders" (2013)	"Give Me Back My Hometown" (2014)	"Cold One" (2014)

"Give Me Back My Hometown" is a song co-written and recorded by American country music singer Eric Church. It was released on 10 January 2014 as the second single from his 2014 album The Outsiders. The song reached number one on the US Billboard Country Airplay chart in May 2014. It also peaked at number 4 on Hot Country Songs. Church wrote this song with Luke Laird.

== Content ==
"Give Me Back My Hometown" has a lyric reminiscing about a lost love from his high school, and the memories evoked when he revisits his hometown. During the chorus, Church sings "Give me back my hometown, 'cause this is my hometown." An uncredited review from Taste of Country compared the song to Church's previous song "Springsteen" and the title track of his 2009 album Carolina. The song is in the key of D-flat major with a main chord pattern of D♭-B♭m-G♭ and a moderate tempo.

== Critical reception ==
Matt Bjorke of Roughstock gave the single 4 out of 5 stars, saying that "Jay Joyce's production once again finds musically interesting things to do while Church earnestly sings about the loss of his hometown, not because it’s actually gone or changed but because the girl who helped it make it worthwhile has left him and the town back" and "for the middle of the road fan who likes the softer moments of Eric Church’s music…this one should easily be much more pleasing to them than "The Outsiders" was." Kevin John Coyne of Country Universe gave the song an "A-" grade, comparing its production to U2's "With or Without You" and describing it as "well-written and nuanced, as Church laments that the memories of a small town that have been tainted by the absence of a loved one."

In September 2024, Country Aircheck declared this song as the fifth longest song of the 2010s, running at 4:12.

== Commercial performance ==
Eric Church had his best debut on the chart when the song entered at No. 95 on the Billboard Hot 100 and No. 39 on the Hot Country Songs during its first week, with 28,000 copies sold. The following week, the song climbed to No. 55 on the Billboard Hot 100 and No. 25 on Hot Country Songs. The song also topped the Country Digital Song chart with over 61,000 copies sold. The song then jumped to No. 36 on the Billboard Hot 100 on its 14th week of release, and No. 4 on the Hot Country Songs chart on its 15th. As of June 2014, "Give Me Back My Hometown" has sold 758,000 copies in the United States.

The song also debuted at No. 61 on the Canadian Hot 100 during its first week and climbed to No. 30 the week after.

== Music video ==
Peter Zavadil directed the accompanying music video for this song. According to The Boot, the video "features Church singing as an ominous story plays out, including a priest (Steven Michael Quezada) presiding over a roadside funeral in a rundown part of town."

In response to viewers' confusion over the meaning of the video's story, Church said that "[he] don't understand it either." It was later stated that the story would continue with the video for each single from the album.

== Chart performance ==
=== Weekly charts ===
Chart (2014)	Peak position
Canada Hot 100 (Billboard)	30
Canada Country (Billboard)	1
US Billboard Hot 100	36
US Country Airplay (Billboard)	1
US Hot Country Songs (Billboard)	4

=== Year-end charts ===
Chart (2014)	Position
Canada Canadian Hot 100	94
US Country Airplay (Billboard)	27
US Hot Country Songs (Billboard)	15

== Certifications ==
Region	Certification	Certified units/sales
Canada (Music Canada)	Gold	40,000^{*}
United States (RIAA)	2× Platinum	758,000
^{*} Sales figures based on certification alone.
