= Talladega (song) =

Single by Eric Church

from the album The Outsiders
- Released: September 15, 2014
- Recorded: 2013–14
- Genre: Country
- Length: 4:22
- Label: EMI Nashville
- Songwriters: Eric Church; Luke Laird
- Producer: Jay Joyce

Eric Church singles chronology
"Cold One" (2014)	"Talladega" (2014)	"Raise 'Em Up" (2015)

"Talladega" is a song co-written and recorded by American country music singer Eric Church. It was released in September 2014 as the fourth single from his 2014 album The Outsiders. Church wrote this song with Luke Laird.

== Background and content ==
"Talladega" is a song about a man who is sharing memories from a trip made to Talladega Superspeedway with friends after his senior year in high school. According to Church, this song was written and partially recorded on July 7, 2012, while he was on tour. It was later recorded with his band in Nashville for release on The Outsiders. Church took inspiration from watching a NASCAR race on television, but both he and co-writer Luke Laird said that the song is not really about racing. Rather, Church said that the race and the song represents "that experience, whatever that is: the experience with the person next to you, and knowing that that’s probably a finite time in your life. It’s not gonna last forever."

== Commercial performance ==
"Talladega" debuted on the Country Digital Songs chart at No. 29, and Hot Country Songs at No. 41, with 14,000 sold when the album The Outsiders was released in February 2014. After the song was released as a single in September, it debuted on the Billboard Hot 100 chart at No. 90 for the charted dated November 8, 2014. It peaked at No. 43 on the Hot 100 for the chart dated February 7, 2015, and at No. 2 on the Hot Country Songs chart a week later. As of March 2015, the single has sold 534,000 copies in the United States. It was certified Platinum by the RIAA for a million units in sales and streams on November 11, 2016.

== Music video ==
The accompanying music video of this song was directed by Peter Zavadil and premiered in December 2014. Despite its title, the video was not filmed at Talladega Superspeedway, but was filmed at Nashville Superspeedway.

== Charts ==
=== Weekly charts ===
Chart (2014–2015)	Peak position
Canada Hot 100 (Billboard)	51
Canada Country (Billboard)	1
US Billboard Hot 100	43
US Country Airplay (Billboard)	1
US Hot Country Songs (Billboard)	2

=== Year-end charts ===
Chart (2014)	Position
US Country Airplay (Billboard)	93
US Hot Country Songs (Billboard)	95

Chart (2015)	Position
US Country Airplay (Billboard)	45
US Hot Country Songs (Billboard)	41

== Certifications ==
Region	Certification	Certified units/sales
United States (RIAA)	3× Platinum	3,000,000^{‡}
^{‡} Sales+streaming figures based on certification alone.
