= Luke Laird =

American songwriter

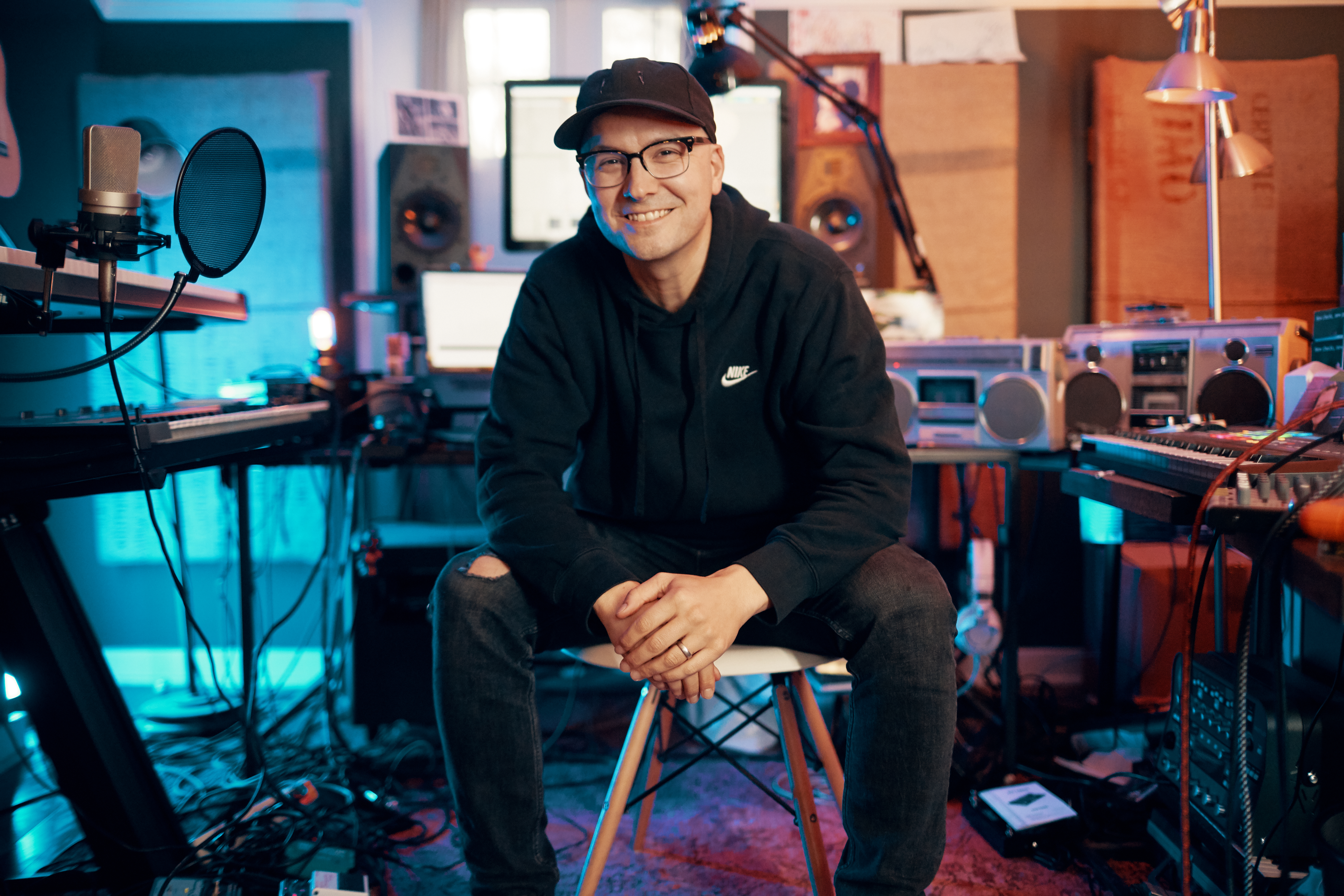

Background information
- Born: May 4, 1978 (age 47); Hartstown, Pennsylvania, U.S.
- Genres: Country; pop; rock; R&B
- Occupation: Songwriter
- Years active: 2004–present
- Website: creativenationmusic.com

Luke Robert Laird (born May 4, 1978, in Hartstown, Pennsylvania) is an American country music songwriter and producer. He has written more than 20 number one Billboard singles, including Carrie Underwood's "So Small", "Temporary Home", and "Undo It"; Blake Shelton's "Gonna"; Sara Evans' "A Little Bit Stronger"; Rodney Atkins's "Take a Back Road"; Eric Church's "Drink in My Hand", "Give Me Back My Hometown", and "Talladega"; Little Big Town's "Pontoon"; Luke Bryan's "I See You" and "Fast"; Thomas Rhett's "T-Shirt"; Kenny Chesney's "American Kids"; Lady Antebellum's "Downtown"; and Jon Pardi's "Head Over Boots." He has also written and produced songs for Tim McGraw, Rascal Flatts, Kacey Musgraves, Toby Keith, Ne-Yo, John Legend, Darius Rucker, and many others.

== Early life ==
Laird was born in Hartstown, PA, United States, on May 4, 1978. He wrote songs and learned guitar in elementary school. After seeing a Randy Travis concert in high school, Laird claims he became fascinated with songwriting and production. He taught himself basic elements of music theory by listening to the radio and dissecting songs. Laird's parents took him in high school to see Middle Tennessee State University and its recording program, and he enrolled there in 1997, graduating in 2001 with a degree in Recording Industry Management.

After college Laird moved to Nashville. Laird's first job in the industry was assistant tour manager for Brooks & Dunn, though he spent his weekends writing. He participated in songwriter nights in Nashville at venues such as Bluebird Cafe. In 2002, Chris Oglesby, at BMG Music at the time, offered Laird a publishing deal. BMG was later bought by Universal Music Publishing Group, which took over Laird's contract and made him a staff writer in 2008.

While working at BMG, he met a receptionist, Beth Mason. The two were married in 2010, and went on to co-found Creative Nation in 2011.

== Music career ==
Early in his time at UMPG, Bill Luther took an interest in him and encouraged him as a writer. Luther brought Laird along with him to write a song with Hillary Lindsey. The three worked together and named a song around their rapport, called "Painless." The song went on to be Laird's first released song by Lee Ann Womack in 2005.

Laird and Lindsey went on to work on a number of songs with Carrie Underwood, including his first number one single "So Small" in 2007. The song held the number one spot on the Billboard Country charts for three weeks and went platinum. Since then Laird has co-written 23 singles that reached No. 1 on the Billboard Country charts. He is a proponent of the “New Country” style of country music, and has worked with pop artists such as Ne-Yo and John Legend. He has written No. 1 hits with Carrie Underwood, Blake Shelton, Tim McGraw, Kenny Chesney, and Eric Church, among others, and has had hits with artists such as Ingrid Michaelson, Jason Aldean, Sara Evans, and Kacey Musgraves, among others.

He was named BMI's Country Songwriter of the Year in 2012, and his song with Rodney Atkins, "Take a Back Road" was named Song of the Year. He was named ACM's Songwriter of the Year in 2015.

He has been nominated for four Grammys for Best Country Song: twice in 2015, for Kenny Chesney's "American Kids" and for Eric Church's "Give Me Back My Hometown," in 2016 for Tim McGraw's "Diamond Rings and Old Barstools," and in 2019 for Kacey Musgraves' "Space Cowboy", which he won. Although he is primarily interested in songwriting, Laird also produced two Grammy nominated albums by Kacey Musgraves, the 2014 Same Trailer Different Park–which won–and the 2016 Pageant Material.

== Creative Nation ==
In 2011, Laird and his wife Beth founded Creative Nation, a music publishing and management company for country music songwriters and producers. While Beth Laird handles logistics, Luke Laird focuses on songwriting.

The company includes Kassi Ashton, Derek Bahr, Oscar Charles, Barry Dean, Jonathan Hutcherson, Lori McKenna, Sandra McCracken, Mia Mantia, Steve Moakler, Ben West, Travis Wood, and Laird himself. Previous clients include Alec Bailey, Casey Brown, Natalie Hemby, Muscadine Bloodline, Tyler Johnson, and Native Run. The company has had partnerships with Concord Music Publishing, Universal Music Publishing Group, Sony ATV Music Publishing, and Pulse Music Group.

== Awards and nominations ==
Grammy Awards

- 2019 Winner: Best Country Song (writer) - "Space Cowboy" by Kacey Musgraves
- 2016 Nominee: Best Country Song (writer) - "Diamond Rings and Old Barstools" by Tim McGraw
- 2015 Nominee: Best Country Song (writer) - "American Kids" by Kenny Chesney
- 2015 Nominee: Best Country Song (writer) - "Give Me Back My Hometown" by Eric Church
- 2014 Winner: Best Country Album (producer) - "Same Trailer Different Park" by Kacey Musgraves

Country Music Association Awards

- 2017 Winner: Triple Play Award
- 2016 Winner: Triple Play Award
- 2015 Winner: Triple Play Award
- 2014 Winner: Triple Play Award
- 2013 Winner: Triple Play Award
- 2011 Winner: Triple Play Award
- 2015 Nominee: Song of the Year (writer) - “American Kids” by Kenny Chesney
- 2015 Nominee: Album of the Year (producer) – Pageant Material by Kacey Musgraves
- 2014 Nominee: Song of the Year (writer) - "Give Me Back My Hometown" by Eric Church
- 2013 Nominee: Song of the Year (writer) - "Pontoon" by Little Big Town
- 2013 Nominee: Album of the Year (producer) - Same Trailer Different Park by Kacey Musgraves
- 2013 Nominee: Single of the Year (producer) - "Merry Go 'Round" by Kacey Musgraves

Academy of Country Music Awards

- 2019 Nominee: Song of the Year (writer) - "Space Cowboy" by Kacey Musgraves
- 2017 Nominee: Songwriter of the Year
- 2015 Nominee: Song of the Year (writer) - "American Kids" by Kenny Chesney
- 2015 Nominee: Song of the Year (writer) - "Give Me Back My Hometown" by Eric Church
- 2015 Winner: Songwriter of the Year
- 2014 Winner: Album of the Year (producer) - Same Trailer Different Park by Kacey Musgraves
- 2014 Nominee: Songwriter of the Year
- 2013 Nominee: Songwriter of the Year
- 2012 Nominee: Songwriter of the Year

American Country Awards

- 2013 Nominee: Song of the Year (writer) - "Pontoon" by Little Big Town

BMI Country Music Awards

- 2012 Winner: Songwriter of the Year
- 2012 Winner: Song of the Year (writer) - "Take a Back Road" by Rodney Atkins
