= 60th Annual Country Music Association Awards =

2026 awards ceremony

- Date: November 18, 2026
- Location: Bridgestone Arena, Nashville, Tennessee, U.S.
- Hosted by: Lainey Wilson

Highlights
- Most wins: Ella Langley (6)
- Most nominations: Ella Langley (9)

Television/radio coverage
- Network: ABC, Disney+

The 60th Annual Country Music Association Awards were held on November 18, 2026, at Bridgestone Arena in Nashville. The ceremony was broadcast live on ABC, Disney+ and streamed the next day on Hulu. Lainey Wilson returned as host for the third consecutive year.

Ella Langley led the nominations, with nine, tying Miranda Lambert and Lainey Wilson's record for most nominations received by a female artist in a single year. She went on to win six awards, the most of the evening and a new record for the most wins in a single ceremony by an artist.

== Background ==
In May 2026, the Country Music Association announced that its broadcast contract with ABC and Disney would be extended through 2032. They also announced the ceremony would be simulcast live from ABC and Disney+.

Following her first nomination for Single of the Year in thirteen years, and her first nomination as the main artist, Taylor Swift took to social media stating “Looks like I haven’t yee’d my last haw thank you CMA…See you there Nov 18”, seemingly confirming that the global icon will be attending the ceremony for the first time in ten years.

=== Dolly Parton Tribute ===
On August 25, the family and estate of Dolly Parton announced that she had died after a "brief battle with cancer". Dubbed the "Queen of Country Music", Parton was the 1978 recipient of Entertainer of the Year, she had forty-four CMA award nominations and won nine CMA awards. She also hosted the ceremony twice and was the recipient of the Willie Nelson Lifetime Achievement Award in 2016. Parton's career had profound influence on popular culture, country music, and the Country Music Association. A special tribute to Dolly Parton that opened the ceremony was announced by the CMA on November 5.

=== Brooks & Dunn Lifetime Achievement ===
On September 14, the association announced that Brooks & Dunn, would receive the Willie Nelson Lifetime Achievement Award, becoming the first duo to receive the honor. Composed of Kix Brooks and Ronnie Dunn, it is the best selling country duo of all time, 1996 recipients of the Entertainer of the Year award, and holds the record for most wins in CMA Awards history, at twenty, including sixteen wins for Vocal Duo of the Year. The duo also hosted the ceremony three times. A statement by the CMA chief executive officer Sarah Trahern accompanying the announcement read, "few artists have left a mark on Country Music quite like Brooks & Dunn. As the most awarded duo in our genre’s history, Kix and Ronnie have spent more than three decades shaping the sound of Country Music. Their music has set a standard that still resonates with new generations of artists, while continuing to win over new generations of fans. We are proud to celebrate everything they’ve given to this genre and the mark they continue to leave on its future".

== Winners and nominees ==
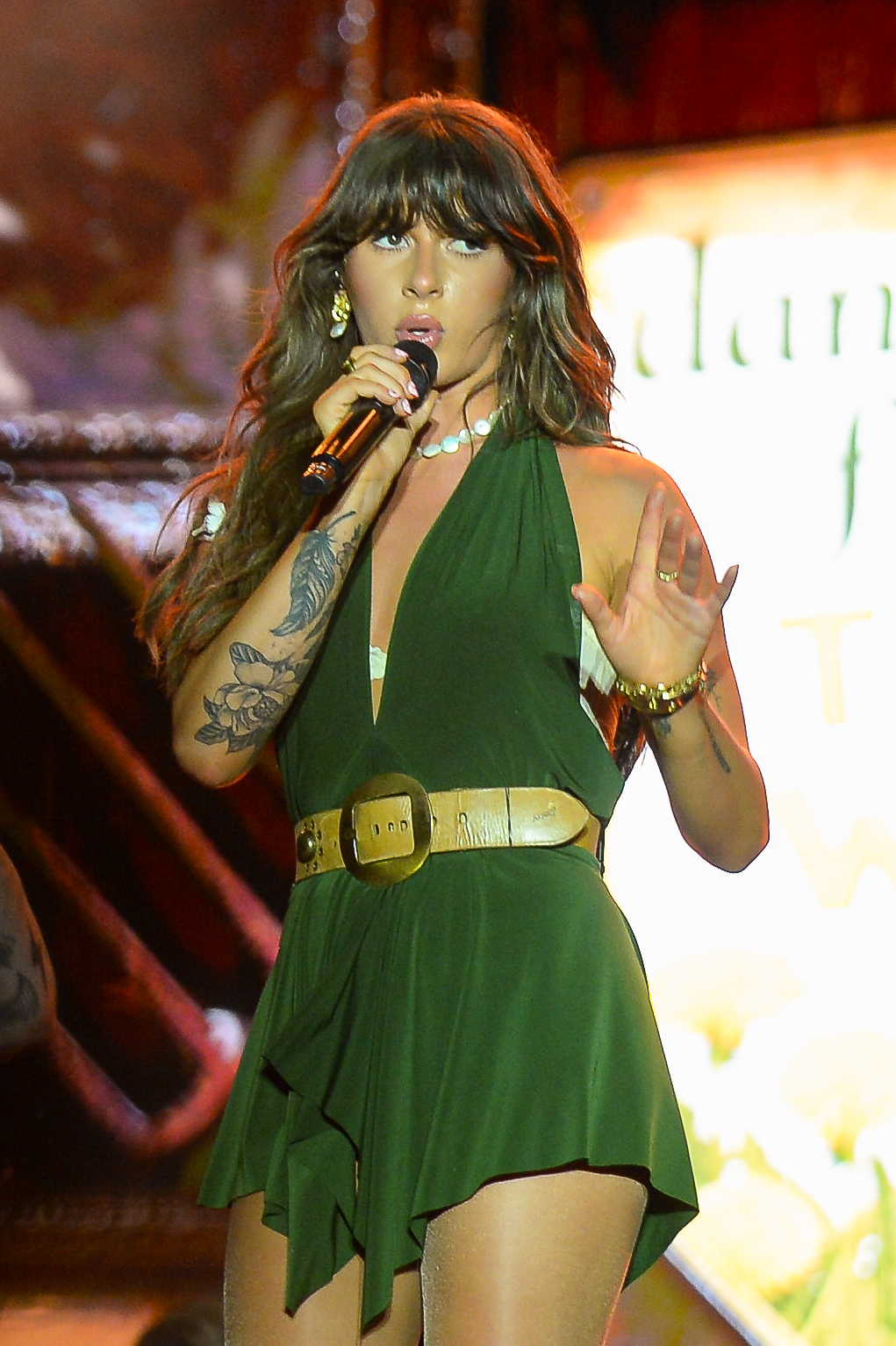
Ella Langley, Entertainer of the Year recipient.

Brooks & Dunn, Willie Nelson Lifetime Achievement Award recipient.

Nominations were announced on September 10, 2026 on Good Morning America by Lee Ann Womack and Hannah Harper, and were also broadcast on the CMA's official YouTube channel. The eligibility period for nominees is from July 1, 2025 to June 30, 2026.

Winners are listed first and highlighted in bold.

Entertainer of the Year	Album of the Year
**Ella Langley**; Luke Combs; Cody Johnson; Chris Stapleton; Lainey Wilson	**Dandelion** — **Ella Langley**; Ain’t in It for My Health — Zach Top; Middle of Nowhere — Kacey Musgraves; Parker McCollum — Parker McCollum; The Way I Am — Luke Combs
Male Vocalist of the Year	Female Vocalist of the Year
**Chris Stapleton**; Luke Combs; Cody Johnson; Zach Top; Stephen Wilson Jr.	**Ella Langley**; Miranda Lambert; Megan Moroney; Kacey Musgraves; Lainey Wilson
Vocal Group of the Year	Vocal Duo of the Year
**The Red Clay Strays**; Lady A; Little Big Town; Midland; Old Dominion	**Brooks & Dunn**; Brothers Osborne; Dan + Shay; Muscadine Bloodline; Thelma & James
Single of the Year	Song of the Year
“**Choosin’ Texas**” — **Ella Langley**; "Be Her” — Ella Langley; "I Knew It, I Knew You” — Taylor Swift; “Somewhere Over Laredo” — Lainey Wilson; “The Fall” — Cody Johnson	“**Choosin’ Texas**” — **Ella Langley, Luke Dick, Miranda Lambert, Joybeth Taylor**; “Be Her” — Ella Langley, Smith Ahnquist, Michael Hardy, Jordan Schmidt; "Beautiful Things” — Megan Moroney, Jessi Alexander, Jessie Jo Dillon, Connie Harrington; “Dry Spell” — Kacey Musgraves, Luke Laird, Shane McAnally, Josh Osborne; "Gary” — Stephen Wilson Jr.
New Artist of the Year	Musician of the Year
**Stephen Wilson Jr.**; Avery Anna; Carter Faith; Emily Ann Roberts; Tucker Wetmore	**Charlie Worsham**, **Guitar**; Tom Bukovac, Guitar; Jenee Fleenor, Fiddle; Paul Franklin, Steel Guitar; Rob McNelley, Guitar
Music Video of the Year	Musical Event of the Year
“**Choosin’ Texas**” — **Ella Langley**; “Dry Spell” — Kacey Musgraves; “Gary” — Stephen Wilson Jr.; “The Fall” — Cody Johnson; “White Horse” — Chris Stapleton	“**McArthur**” — **Hardy, Eric Church, Morgan Wallen,** and **Tim McGraw**; “A Song To Sing” — Miranda Lambert and Chris Stapleton; “Horses and Divorces” — Kacey Musgraves and Miranda Lambert; “I Can’t Love You Anymore” — Ella Langley and Morgan Wallen; “If I Don’t Leave I’m Gonna Stay” — Carly Pearce and Riley Green
Willie Nelson Lifetime Achievement Award
**Brooks & Dunn**

=== International Awards ===
The international nominees were announced on September 3, 2026.

International Artist Achievement Award	Global Country Artist Award	International Country Broadcaster Award
Jordan Davis; Drake Milligan; Tucker Wetmore; Lainey Wilson	Wade Forster; Gareth; James Johnston; Tami Neilson	Shannon Ella; Bob Harris; Baylen Leonard; Justin Thomson

== Performances ==
The initial slate of performers was announced on November 5, 2026. A second wave of performers were announced a few days later on November 10, alongside the line-up of artists paying tribute to Brooks & Dunn. Taylor Swift was announced on November 13, her first performance at the award show since 2013.

Performer(s)	Song(s)
Vince Gill; Lainey Wilson	Tribute to Dolly Parton "I Will Always Love You"
Kacey Musgraves; Miranda Lambert	"Horses and Divorces"
Zach Top	"Moonshine"
Dierks Bentley; Zach Top	Tribute to John Anderson "Swingin'"
Mumford & Sons; Chris Stapleton	"Here"
Ella Langley	"Loving Life Again"
Taylor Swift	"I Knew It, I Knew You" "Our Song" (feat. Keith Urban on banjo)
Tim McGraw	Honoring his 2026 Country Music Hall of Fame Induction "Don't Take The Girl"
Lainey Wilson	"Just A Woman"
Megan Moroney	"Beautiful Things"
Tucker Wetmore	"Who Told You That" "All My Rowdy Friends Are Coming Over Tonight"
Halestorm; Marcus King; HARDY; Brothers Osborne; Luke Bryan; Brad Paisley on guitar	Willie Nelson Lifetime Achievement Award honoring Brooks & Dunn "Boot Scootin' Boogie" "Rock My World (Little Country Girl)" "Hard Workin' Man" "Hillbilly Deluxe" "Play Something Country"
Luke Combs	"Miss You Here"
Miranda Lambert; Ella Langley	"Snakeskin Boots"
Chris Stapleton; Stephen Wilson Jr.	"I'm A Song"
The Red Clay Strays	"Revival"

== Presenters ==
Presenter(s)	Notes
Jessica Chastain	Presented Single of the Year
Kimberly Williams Paisley and Darius Rucker	Presented New Artist of the Year
Glen Powell and Shaboozey	Presented Song of The Year
Clint Black	Introduced Florida Georgia Line
Florida Georgia Line	Presented Vocal Duo of the Year
Kimberly Williams Paisley	Introduced Taylor Swift
Lady A	Introduced Tim McGraw
Leanne Morgan	Introduced Lainey Wilson
Joe Buck and Laura Rutledge	Presented Vocal Group of the Year
Avery Anna, Carter Faith, and Emily Ann Roberts	Introduced Megan Moroney
Carly Pearce and Michael Bublé	Presented Album of the Year
Taylor Swift	Presented Willie Nelson Lifetime Achievement Award to Brooks & Dunn
Zach Top	Honored Armed Service Members and Veterans (sponsored by Chevrolet)
Lee Ann Womack, Martina McBride and Cece Winans	Presented Female Vocalist of the Year
Little Big Town	Presented Male Vocalist of the Year
Matt Rife	Introduced The Red Clay Strays
Vince Gill	Presented Entertainer of the Year

== Milestones and achievements ==
Some, as reported by Billboard.

- Ella Langley broke the record for most wins by a woman in a single ceremony, with six wins.
- Ella Langley became the first artist to win Single and Song of the year in consecutive years.
- Brooks & Dunn is the most-winning CMA Awards act of all time with twenty wins. They have an opportunity to extend that lead this year.
- Chris Stapleton extended his Male Vocalist of the Year record to nine wins.
- Ella Langley joined Alan Jackson as the only artists to win the top five awards in a single ceremony, accomplished by Jackson in 2002.
- Women accounted for four of the five nominees in the Single of the Year category for the first time ever.
- Ella Langley's dual nominations for "Choosin' Texas" and "Be Her" made her only the fifth artist in CMA history to ever be nominated twice in the same year for Single of the Year, for two works as the main artist; joining Miranda Lambert (2010), Alan Jackson (2002), Merle Haggard (1970), Johnny Cash (1969).
- Jay Joyce's nomination as a producer on Wilson's "Somewhere Over Laredo" was his fourteenth Single of the Year nomination, putting him second to Tony Brown for most nods in the category as a producer.
- Miranda Lambert surpassed Reba McEntire as the most nominated woman in the Female Vocalist of the Year category, with nineteen. McEntire scored eighteen nods between 1983 and 2017.
- Shane McAnally became the most nominated person in the Song of the Year category after earning his eleventh nod for "Dry Spell", breaking a tie with Alan Jackson, who had ten nominations.
- Little Big Town earned their twenty-first consecutive nomination for Vocal Group of the Year, extending the longest consecutive nomination streak in CMA history.

== Controversy ==
On November 5, 2026, 1990s country artist Sammy Kershaw posted on his social media pages claiming that he and his wife had been denied permission to walk the red carpet at the awards show after being "strung along" by the organization for months. The post quickly went viral and several artists voiced their support for Kershaw, including 2026 nominees Riley Green and Carly Pearce, Jake Owen, and fellow 1990s country artist Pam Tillis, while Rodney Atkins subsequently claimed that his request had also been denied.

In an article discussing the controversy, writers from Rolling Stone pointed out the risk of the story overshadowing the awards, particularly in a year with so many female artists leading the nominations, and the lack of attention paid to other shortcomings from the CMA. They also noted that it is possible that Kershaw simply did not meet the requirements to walk the red carpet, which include being a previous Entertainer of the Year winner, having a top 20 single or top 10 album in the three years prior to the ceremony, being a member of the Country Music Hall of Fame, a reigning CMA award winner from the previous ceremony, or having recently participated in a CMA Foundation initiative. The CMA later released a statement on November 9, commenting that they were "deeply sorry anyone felt excluded," and were "committed to keep listening and finding ways to make sure all artists feel welcome and at home". They also stated that they were in touch with Kershaw's team in order to "[continue] the conversation".

On November 10, Kershaw released a new statement saying, "The CMA has also extended an invitation for my wife, Mendy, and me to walk the red carpet and attend this year’s awards alongside our fellow artists...", but concluded the statement with "My sincere hope is that the conversations we’ve begun with the CMA will lead to lasting change and an even greater appreciation and recognition of our industry’s legacy artists for many years to come. Because the spotlight may move on, the charts may change, and the years may pass. But the people who built country music should never be forgotten."
