= Willie Nelson Lifetime Achievement Award =

Annual American country music award

- Country: United States
- Presented by: Country Music Association
- First award: 2012
- Currently held by: Vince Gill (2025)

The Willie Nelson Lifetime Achievement Award, instituted in 2012 during the 46th CMA Awards, is given by the Country Music Association. The presentation of the award is intended to "honor an iconic artist who has attained the highest degree of recognition in Country Music [...] who has achieved both national and international prominence and stature through concert performances, humanitarian efforts, philanthropy, record sales, streaming numbers, and public representation at the highest level", with the condition that the recipient "must have positively impacted and contributed to the growth of the genre throughout a course of years that have proven to have an unprecedented historical impact on fans and industry alike".

The award, first presented to Willie Nelson, and named after him, was designed by Chicago manufacturer R.S. Owens & Company. The trophy was built resembling the "bullet shape" of a regular CMA award, formed by two aluminum struts that support a bronze medallion on top, with the entire structure attached to a walnut base.

== Recipients ==
† Indicates a posthumous award

Year	Recipients	Achievements	Tribute Performance
2012	Willie Nelson (b. 1933)	Ten-time CMA award winner (including the 1979 Entertainer of the Year); Member of the Country Music Hall of Fame; Seventy-seven studio albums; Thirty-three 'Number One' singles; Fifteen-time Grammy winner; 1998 Kennedy Center Honors recipient	"Always on My Mind" and "Crazy" — Lady A; "Whiskey River"— Blake Shelton, Keith Urban and Mickey Raphael; "Good Hearted Woman" — Tim McGraw and Faith Hill; "On the Road Again" — Willie Nelson (with Shelton, Urban, Hill, McGraw and Lady A)
2013	Kenny Rogers (1938–2020)	Five-time CMA award winner; Member of the Country Music Hall of Fame; Thirty-nine studio albums; Thirty 'Number One' singles; Three-time Grammy winner	"Sweet Music Man" — Jennifer Nettles; "Just Dropped In"— Rascal Flatts; "The Gambler" — Darius Rucker; "Islands in the Stream"— Kenny Rogers (with Nettles)
2015	Johnny Cash† (1932–2003)	Nine-time CMA award winner (including the 1969 Entertainer of the Year); Member of the Country Music Hall of Fame; Member of the Rock and Roll and Gospel Music Hall of Fame; Member of the Grand Ole Opry; Sixty-seven studio albums; Thirteen 'Number One' singles; Eighteen-time Grammy winner; 1996 Kennedy Center Honors recipient	—N/a
2016	Dolly Parton (1946–2026)	Nine-time CMA award winner (including the 1978 Entertainer of the Year); Member of the Country Music Hall of Fame; Member of the Songwriters and Gospel Music Hall of Fame; Member of the Grand Ole Opry; Forty-nine solo studio albums; Twenty-five 'Number One' singles; Ten-time Grammy winner; 2006 Kennedy Center Honors recipient	"Jolene" — Jennifer Nettles (with Pentatonix); "9 to 5" — Reba McEntire; "Here You Come Again" — Kacey Musgraves; "I Will Always Love You" — Carrie Underwood and Martina McBride (with Nettles, Musgraves and McEntire)
2019	Kris Kristofferson (1936–2024)^{[a]}	CMA award winner; Member of the Country Music Hall of Fame; 1976 Golden Globe Winner for Best Actor in a Musical or Comedy; Eighteen studio albums; One 'Number One' single; Three-time Grammy winner; 2003 Americana Music Award for Free Speech recipient	"Me and Bobby McGee" — Dierks Bentley, Sheryl Crow, Chris Janson, Joe Walsh and John Osborne
2020	Charley Pride (1934–2020)	Three-time CMA award winner (including the 1971 Entertainer of the Year); Member of the Country Music Hall of Fame; Member of the Grand Ole Opry; Forty-four studio albums; Forty 'Number One' singles; Three-time Grammy Award winner	"Kiss an Angel Good Mornin'" — Charley Pride (with Jimmie Allen)
2021	Loretta Lynn (1932–2022)^{[b]}	Eight-time CMA award winner (including the 1972 Entertainer of the Year); Member of the Country Music Hall of Fame; Member of the Songwriters Hall of Fame; Member of the Grand Ole Opry; Fifty studio albums; Twenty-three 'Number One' singles; Four-time Grammy winner; 2003 Kennedy Center Honors recipient	—N/a
2022	Alan Jackson (b. 1958)	Sixteen-time CMA award winner (including the 1995, 2002 and 2003 Entertainer of the Year); Member of the Country Music Hall of Fame; Member of the Grand Ole Opry; Twenty-one studio albums; Twenty-seven 'Number One' singles; Two-time Grammy Award winner	"Remember When" — Carrie Underwood; "Chattahoochee" — Dierks Bentley; "Drive (For Daddy Gene)" — Jon Pardi; "Chasin' That Neon Rainbow" — Lainey Wilson; "Don't Rock the Jukebox" — Alan Jackson
2024	George Strait (b. 1952)	Twenty three-time CMA winner (including the 1989, 1990, and 2013 Entertainer of the Year); Member of the Country Music Hall of Fame; Thirty-one studio albums; Sixty 'Number One' singles; Grammy Award winner; 2025 Kennedy Center Honors recipient	"Amarillo By Morning" — Lainey Wilson; "Give It Away" — Jamey Johnson; "Troubadour" — Miranda Lambert and Parker McCollum; "Honky Tonk Hall of Fame" — George Strait and Chris Stapleton
2025	Vince Gill (b. 1957)	Eighteen-time CMA winner (including the 1993 and 1994 Entertainer of the Year); Member of the Country Music Hall of Fame; Member of the Songwriters Hall of Fame and Nashville Songwriters Hall of Fame; Member of the Grand Ole Opry; Twenty studio albums; Seven 'Number One' singles; Twenty two-time Grammy Award winner	"When I Call Your Name" — Brandi Carlile and Patty Loveless
2026	Brooks & Dunn; Kix Brooks (b. 1955); Ronnie Dunn (b. 1953)	Twenty-one-time CMA winner (including the 1996 Entertainer of the Year); Members of the Country Music Hall of Fame; Thirteen studio albums; Twenty-one 'Number One' singles; Two-time Grammy Award winners	"Boot Scootin' Boogie" — Halestorm; "Rock My World (Little Country Girl)" — Marcus King; "Hard Workin' Man" — Brothers Osborne; "Hillbilly Deluxe" — Hardy; "Play Something Country" — Luke Bryan (with Brad Paisley)

a. Kristofferon was not in attendance when he received the award as he had a show scheduled on the same night.
b. Lynn was not in attendance when she received her award. Also the award was not acknowledged during the 2021 ceremony.
