= 53rd Annual Country Music Association Awards =

2019 music award ceremony

- Date: November 13, 2019
- Location: Bridgestone Arena; Nashville, Tennessee
- Hosted by: Carrie Underwood; Reba McEntire (Special Guest); Dolly Parton (Special Guest)

Highlights
- Most wins: Luke Combs; Kacey Musgraves (2 each)
- Most nominations: Maren Morris (6)

Television/radio coverage
- Network: ABC
- Viewership: 11.27 million

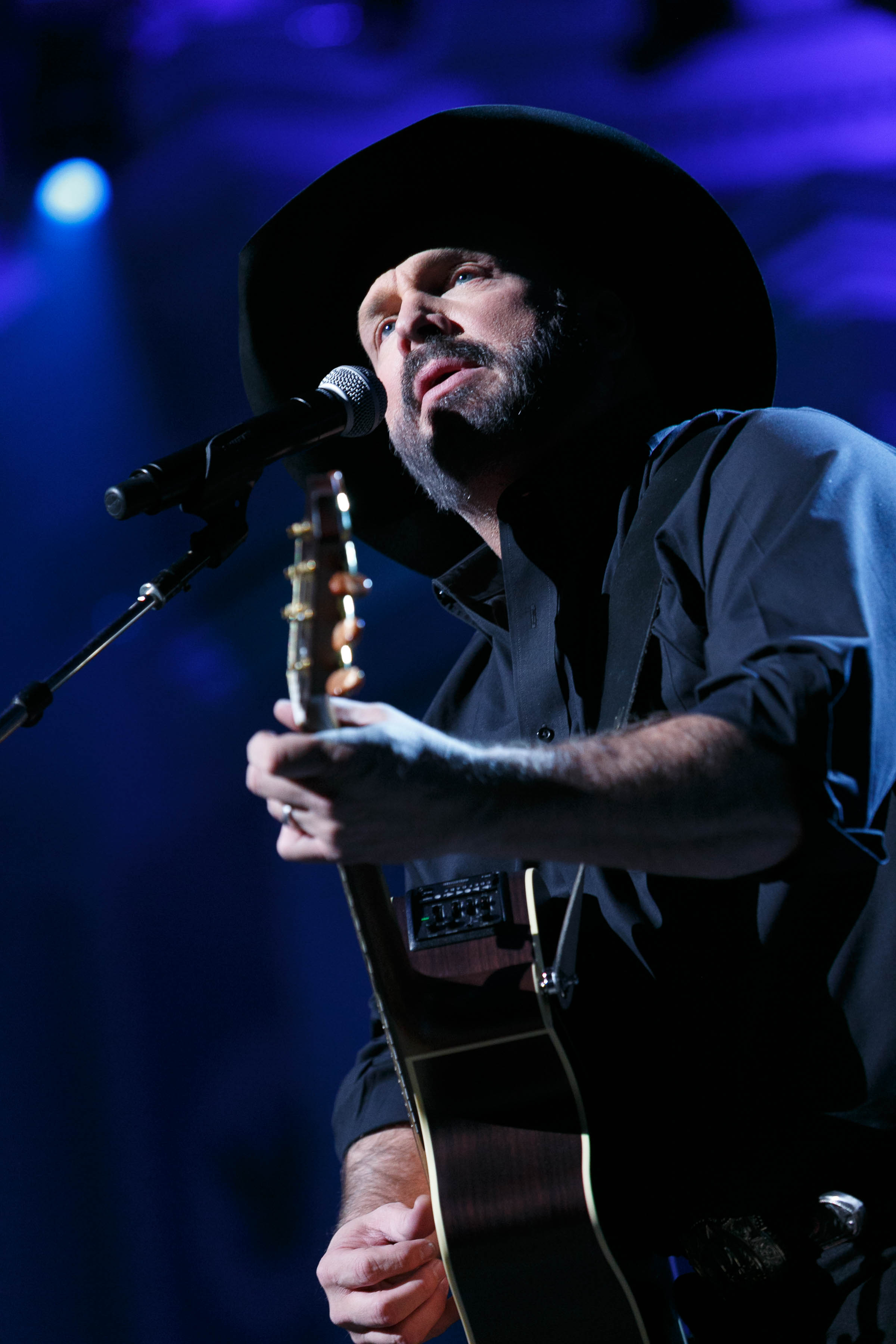
Garth Brooks, Entertainer of the Year recipient.

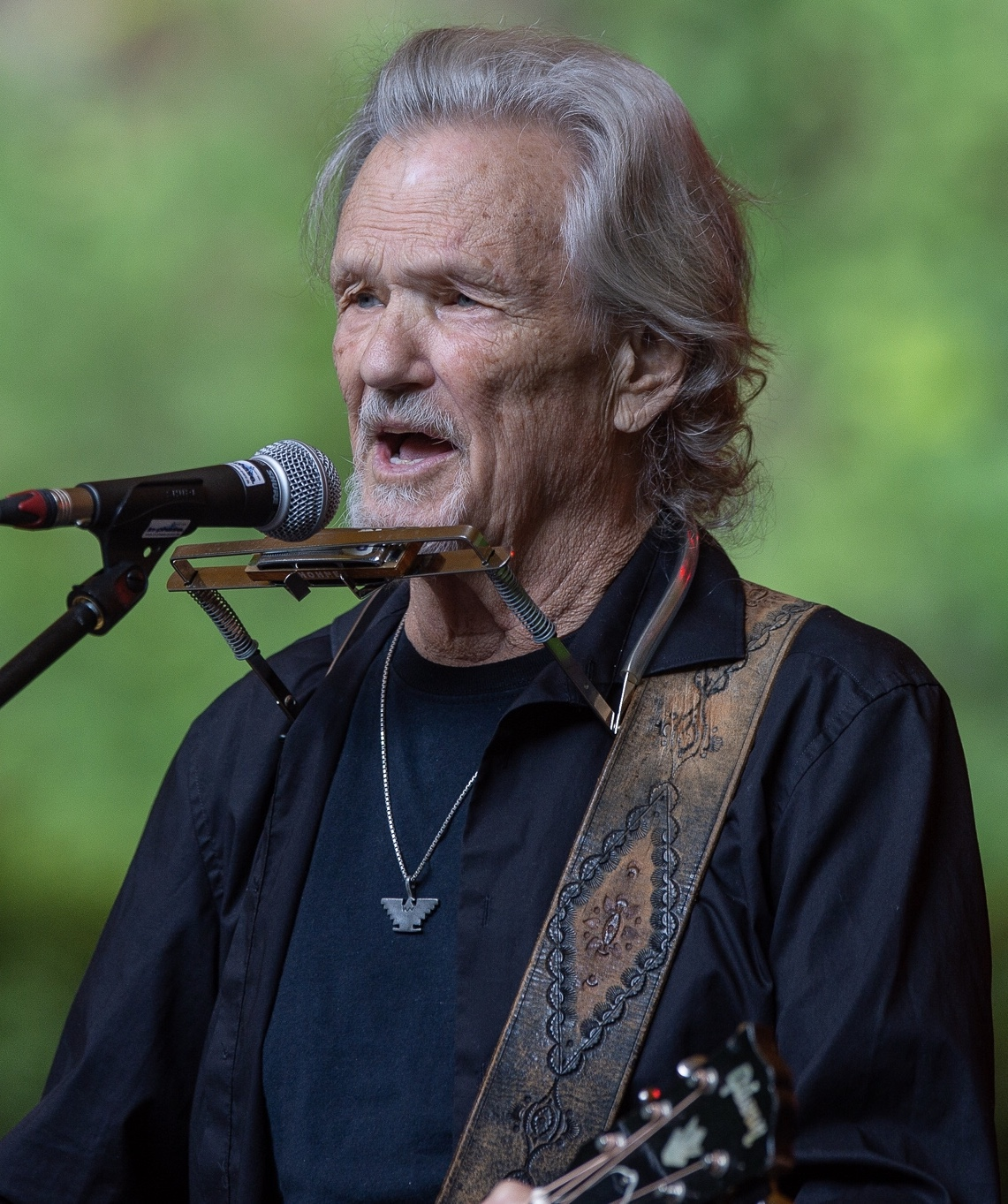
Kris Kristofferson, Willie Nelson Lifetime Achievement award recipient.

53rd Annual Country Music Association Awards were held on November 13, 2019, at Bridgestone Arena in Nashville, Tennessee. The ceremony recognizes some of the best country music released during the eligibility period. Carrie Underwood hosted the event with special guest hosts Reba McEntire and Dolly Parton, celebrating legendary women in country music.

== Background ==
"In addition to awarding the year's best and brightest in the genre, the 53rd Annual CMA Awards will celebrate the legacy of women within country music, and we couldn't think of a more dynamic group of women to host the show." said CMA CEO Sarah Trahern. For the first time in CMA history, women were nominated in every category, except Male Vocalist of the Year.

== Winners and nominees ==
The CMA Awards nominees were announced live on Good Morning America by Jimmie Allen, Ashley McBryde, Midland and Morgan Wallen. For the 53rd CMA Awards, an artist must have released work in the eligibility period which ran from July 1, 2018, to June 30, 2019. On November 6, 2019, Kris Kristofferson was revealed to be the recipient of the Willie Nelson Lifetime Achievement Award.

Winners were denoted in Bold.

Entertainer of the Year	Album of the Year
**Garth Brooks**; Eric Church; Chris Stapleton; Carrie Underwood; Keith Urban	**Girl — Maren Morris**; Center Point Road — Thomas Rhett; Cry Pretty — Carrie Underwood; Dan + Shay — Dan + Shay; Desperate Man — Eric Church
Male Vocalist of the Year	Female Vocalist of the Year
**Luke Combs**; Dierks Bentley; Thomas Rhett; Chris Stapleton; Keith Urban	**Kacey Musgraves**; Kelsea Ballerini; Miranda Lambert; Maren Morris; Carrie Underwood
Vocal Group of the Year	Vocal Duo of the Year
**Old Dominion**; Lady Antebellum; Little Big Town; Midland; Zac Brown Band	**Dan + Shay**; Brooks & Dunn; Brothers Osborne; Florida Georgia Line; Maddie & Tae
Single of the Year	Song of the Year
**"God's Country" — Blake Shelton**; "Burning Man" — Dierks Bentley and Brothers Osborne; "Girl" — Maren Morris; "Millionaire" — Chris Stapleton; "Speechless" — Dan + Shay	**"Beautiful Crazy" — Luke Combs, Wyatt B. Durrette III, Robert Williford**; "Girl" — Maren Morris, Sarah Aarons, Greg Kurstin; "God's Country" — Devin Dawson, Jordan Schmidt, Michael Hardy; "Rainbow" — Natalie Hemby, Shane McAnally, Kacey Musgraves; "Tequila" — Dan Smyers, Nicolle Galyon, Jordan Reynold
New Artist of the Year	Musician of the Year
**Ashley McBryde**; Cody Johnson; Midland; Carly Pearce; Morgan Wallen	**Jenee Fleenor, Fiddle**; Paul Franklin, Steel Guitar; Mac McAnally, Guitar; Ilya Toshinsky, Banjo/Guitar; Derek Wells, Guitar
Music Video of the Year	Musical Event of the Year
**"Rainbow" — Kacey Musgraves; (Dir. Hannah Lux Davis)**; "Burning Man" — Dierks Bentley and Brothers Osborne; (Dir. Wes Edwards); "Girl" — Maren Morris; (Dir. Dave Meyers); "God's Country" — Blake Shelton; (Dir. Sophie Muller); "Some of It" — Eric Church; (Dir. Reid Long)	**"Old Town Road (Remix)" — Lil Nas X and Billy Ray Cyrus**; "All My Favorite People" — Maren Morris and Brothers Osborne; "Brand New Man" — Brooks & Dunn and Luke Combs; "Dive Bar" — Garth Brooks and Blake Shelton; "What Happens in a Small Town" — Brantley Gilbert and Lindsay Ell
Willie Nelson Lifetime Achievement Award
**Kris Kristofferson**

=== International Awards ===
Award	Recipient
International Artist Achievement Award	Kacey Musgraves
International Country Broadcaster Award	Baylen Leonard
Jo Walker-Meador International Award	Susan Heymann
Jeff Walker Global Country Artist Award	Travis Collins and Ward Thomas

== Performers ==
Artist(s)	Song(s)
Dolly Parton; Reba McEntire; Carrie Underwood; Jennifer Nettles; Karen Fairchild; Kimberly Schlapman; The Highwomen; Tanya Tucker; Gretchen Wilson; Crystal Gayle; Terri Clark; Sara Evans; Martina McBride	Celebrating Women of Country "Those Memories of You" "You're Lookin' at Country" "Your Good Girl's Gonna Go Bad" "Delta Dawn" "Redneck Woman" "Don't It Make My Brown Eyes Blue" "Better Things to Do" "Born to Fly" "Independence Day"
Dan + Shay	"Speechless"
Miranda Lambert	"It All Comes Out in the Wash"
Reba McEntire	"Fancy"
Chris Stapleton; Pink	"Love Me Anyway"
Old Dominion	"One Man Band"
Carrie Underwood	"Drinking Alone"
Luke Combs	"Beer Never Broke My Heart"
Kelsea Ballerini	"Homecoming Queen?"
Kelsea Ballerini; Lindsay Ell; Runaway June; Maddie & Tae; Ashley McBryde; Carly Pearce; Little Big Town	"Girl Crush"
Lady Antebellum; Halsey	"What If I Never Get Over You" "Graveyard"
Brooks & Dunn; Brothers Osborne	"Hard Workin' Man"
Maren Morris	"Girl"
Blake Shelton; Jenee Fleenor	"God's Country"
Thomas Rhett	"Remember You Young"
Dolly Parton; For King & Country; Zach Williams	"God Only Knows" "There Was Jesus" "Faith"
Keith Urban	"We Were"
Dierks Bentley; Sheryl Crow; Chris Janson; John Osborne; Joe Walsh	Willie Nelson Lifetime Achievement Award honoring Kris Kristofferson "Me and Bobby McGee"
Eric Church	"Some of It"
Kacey Musgraves; Willie Nelson	"Rainbow Connection" "Rainbow"
Garth Brooks; Blake Shelton	"Dive Bar"

== Presenters ==
Presenter(s)	Award
Lara Spencer and Deana Carter	Single of the Year
Jennifer Nettles and Kristin Chenoweth	Song of the Year
Blanco Brown and Jim Gaffigan	New Artist of the Year
Jimmie Allen and Midland	Vocal Duo of the Year
Hannah Brown, Cody Johnson and Morgan Wallen	Vocal Group of the Year
Bobby Bones and Joe Walsh	Album of the Year
Trisha Yearwood	Male Vocalist of the Year
Janie Fricke, Kathy Mattea, Martina McBride and Pam Tillis	Female Vocalist of the Year
Reese Witherspoon	Entertainer of the Year

== Notes ==
- Carrie Underwood returned as host for her twelfth time; however, she was not joined by Brad Paisley for this year's show. Following the broadcast, Underwood announced that she would not return as the host for the 54th CMA Awards.
- Jenee Fleenor was the first female ever to be nominated for Musician of the Year and subsequently became the first female to win the award.
- Kris Kristofferson was unable to accept his Lifetime Achievement Award in person because he had a prior commitment to play a show on the same night.
