= Stephen Wilson Jr. =

American musician (born 1979)

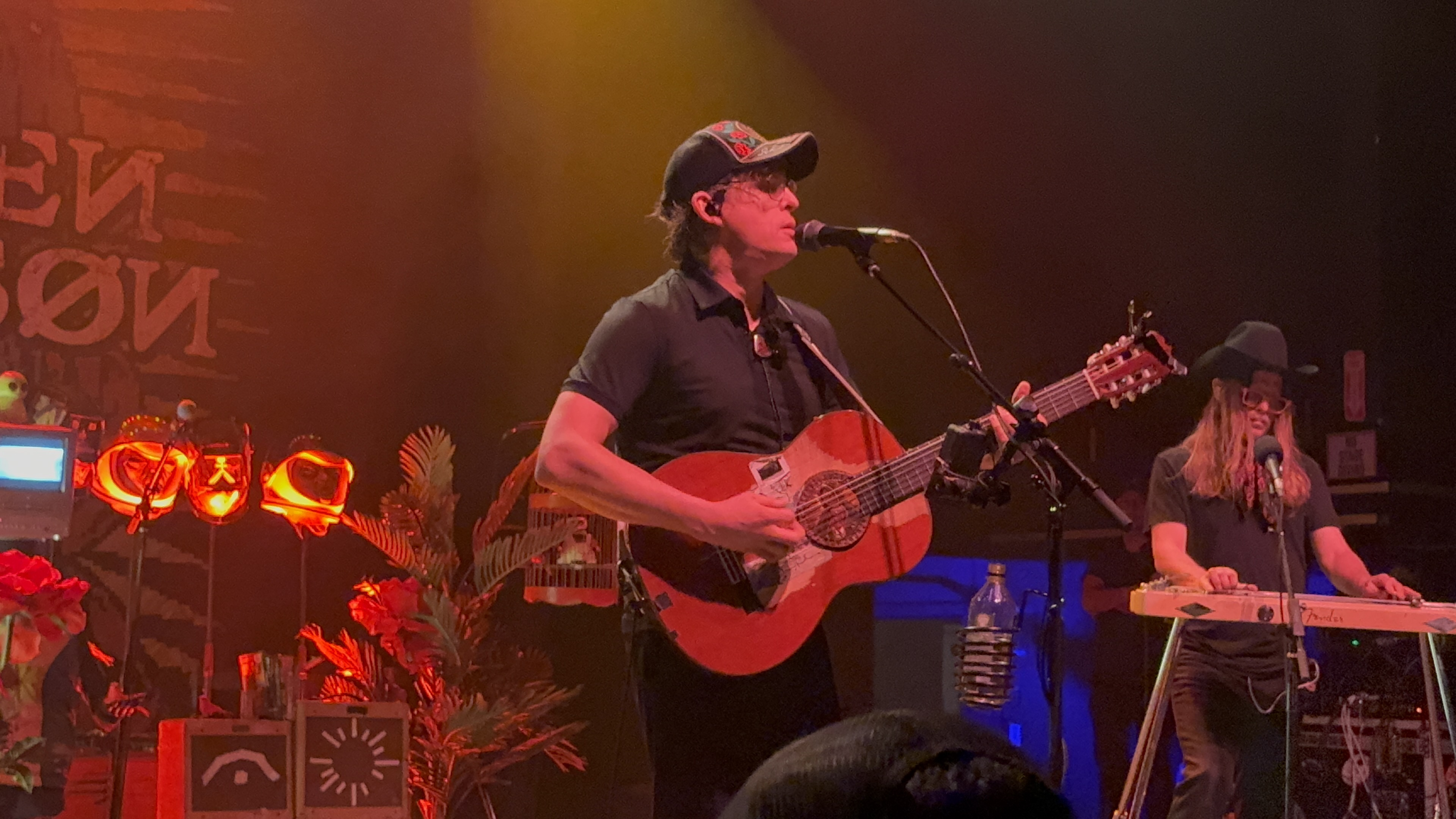
- Wilson Jr. performing in 2025

Background information
- Born: July 11, 1979 (age 47); Seymour, Indiana, US
- Genres: Rock; country
- Occupation: Musician
- Instruments: Vocals; guitar
- Years active: 2017–present
- Labels: BMG; Big Loud
- Formerly of: AutoVaughn
- Spouse: Leigh Nash
- Website: stephenwilsonjr.com

Stephen Wilson Jr. (born July 11, 1979) is an American country and rock singer, guitarist, and songwriter.

== Early and personal life ==
Born on July 11, 1979, Wilson was raised in Seymour, Indiana. Introverted as a youth, Wilson and his brother were guided by their father into competitive boxing. This experience, culminating in Golden Gloves amateur boxing competitions, helped him conquer stage fright. Wilson recalls how country singer Tim McGraw's song "Don't Take the Girl" profoundly impacted him as a teenager. Raised poor by a single dad, and with an absent mother who suffered through abusive relationships, the song's storytelling sparked in him a passion for lyrics and poetry, leading him to begin writing his own songs. Wilson is married to singer Leigh Nash.

Wilson's father died in September 2018.

== Career ==
After leaving his first band, AutoVaughn, Wilson settled into a stable job in the research and development department of Mars' food-science lab. There, he thrived professionally, got married, and moved to the countryside to raise his stepson, while continuing to write songs. After three years, he left Mars to become a full-time musician, taking a job with BMG as a staff songwriter in 2016.

Wilson signed with BMG, and his first release was the 2021 single "Made for This", a duet with his wife, Leigh Nash. In 2022, he issued another single, titled "Year to Be Young 1994 (Unplugged)". Wilson co-wrote the 2023 single "CRZY" by Dallas Smith. In 2023, he published his debut album, the EP bon aqua. He followed it in 2023 with the album Son of Dad, which was inspired by the death of his father. In 2025, this was re-issued as a deluxe version that included additional acoustic and live tracks. Later in 2025, Wilson released the covers EP Blankets, which includes songs by Nirvana, Temple of the Dog, the Postal Service, and the Smashing Pumpkins.

"Gary" was released on January 26, 2026, as Wilson's first single to country radio, via Big Loud. It reached the top 40 on the Billboard Country Airplay chart.

== Musical style and influences ==
Wilson's music is a blend of country and rock, and he has described it as "Death Cab for Country", a reference to the indie rock band Death Cab for Cutie. As a child, he had a passion for country musician Willie Nelson, and he considers the grunge band Nirvana to be among his chief musical influences. In 2025, he covered their song "Something in the Way" on his EP Blankets. Wilson credits Soundgarden's Kim Thayil and Chris Cornell for helping him learn the guitar, particularly through their tunings.

== Discography ==
=== Studio albums ===
List of studio albums, with selected details
Title	Album details
Son of Dad	Release date: September 15, 2023; Label: Big Loud; Format: CD, digital download, LP
Impression of a Human // Children of the Cornermen	Release date: February 26, 2027; Label: Big Loud; Format: CD, digital download, LP

=== EPs ===
List of EPs, with selected details
Title	Album details
Bon Aqua	Release date: March 24, 2023; Label: Big Loud; Format: Digital download
Blankets	Release date: August 29, 2025; Label: Big Loud; Format: Digital download

=== Singles ===
List of charted singles, with selected positions
Title	Year	Peak chart positions	Album
Title	Year	US Country Airplay	Album
"Gary"	2026	33	Impression of a Human // Children of the Cornermen

=== Promotional singles ===
- "Made for This" (with Leigh Nash) (2021)
- "Year to Be Young 1994 (Unplugged)" (2022)
- "Father's Søn" (2023)
- "Mighty Beast" (2023)
- "All the Wars from Now On" (2023)
- "Patches" (2023)
- "Father's Søn (Acoustic)" (2024)
- "The Tunnel" (with Lori McKenna) (2024)
- "Stand by Me (Live at the Print Shop)" (2024)
- "The Star-Spangled Banner (Live from the 2025 NFL Draft)" (2025)
- "Dig a Hole" (2025)
- "Took a Walk (from The Long Walk)" (with Shaboozey) (2025)
- "If There's a Heaven" (with Noah Cyrus) (2025)
- "Hardwired" (with Miranda Lambert) (2026)

=== Music videos ===
Title	Year	Director(s)	Ref.
2026	"Gary"	Tim Cofield	

== Awards and nominations ==
=== CMT Music Awards ===
Year	Nominee / work	Award	Result
2020	"With a Little Help From My Friends" (with Charlie Worsham and Various Artists)	Quarantine Video of the Year	Nominated
2024	"Year to Be Young 1994" (from CMT Studio Sessions)	CMT Performance of the Year	Nominated

=== Academy of Country Music Awards ===
Year	Nominee / work	Award	Result
2026	"Cuckoo"	Visual Media of the Year	Won

=== Country Music Association Awards ===
Year	Nominee / work	Award	ResultWon
2025	Stephen Wilson Jr.	New Artist of the Year	Nominated
2026	Stephen Wilson Jr.	New Artist of the Year	Won
2026	Stephen Wilson Jr.	Male Vocalist of the Year	Nominated
2026	"Gary"	Song of the Year	Nominated
2026	"Gary"	Video of the Year	Nominated
