= Country Music Association Award for Female Vocalist of the Year =

Annual music award

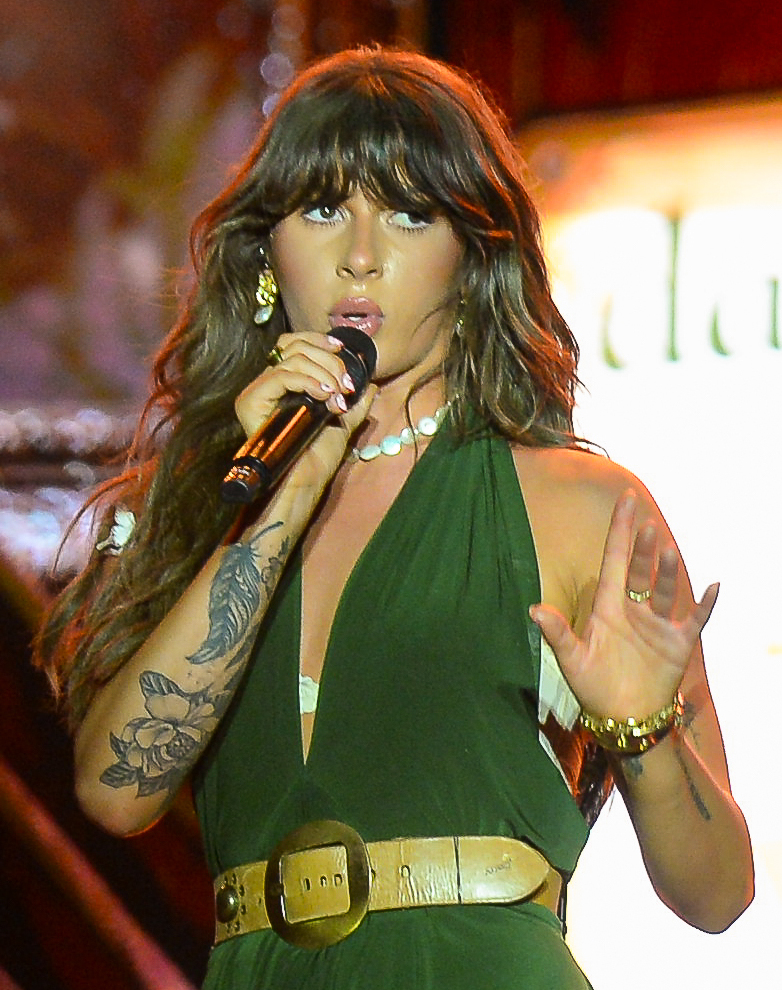
- Current winner of the award Ella Langley
- Country: United States
- Presented by: Country Music Association
- First award: 1967
- Currently held by: Ella Langley (2026)

The following list shows the recipients for the Country Music Association Award for Female Vocalist of the Year. The award is based on individual musical performance on a solo country single or album release, as well as the artist's overall contribution to country music during the eligibility period.

The inaugural recipient of the award was Loretta Lynn in 1967. Miranda Lambert holds the record for most wins in the category, with seven, while she and four-time recipient Reba McEntire share a leading eighteen nominations. Anne Murray holds the record for most nominations without a win, with seven.

== Recipients ==
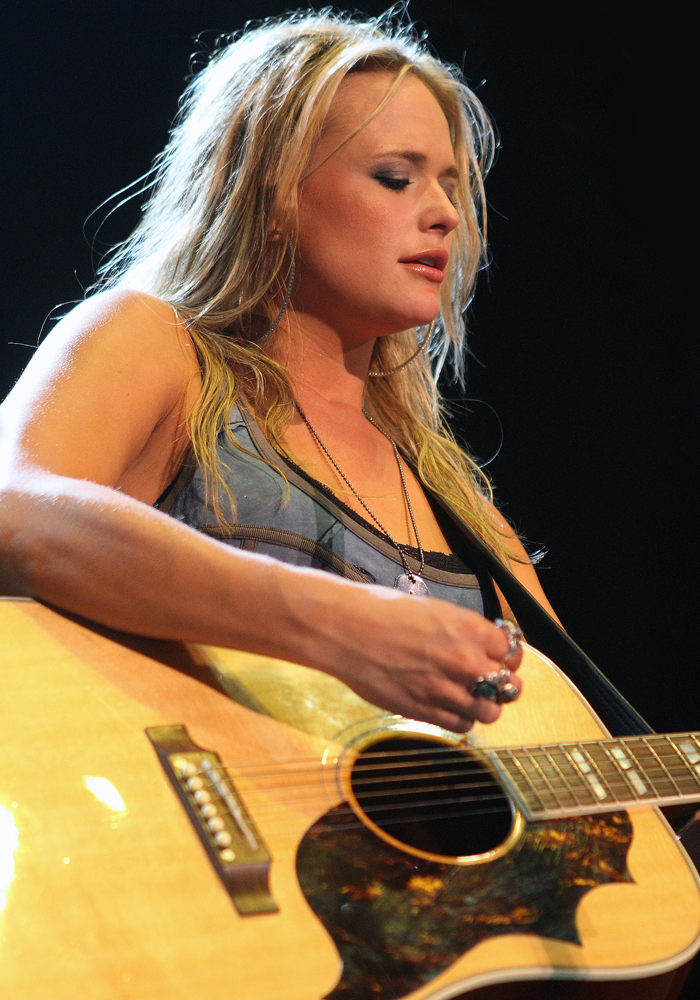
Miranda Lambert is the most awarded female vocalist with seven wins.

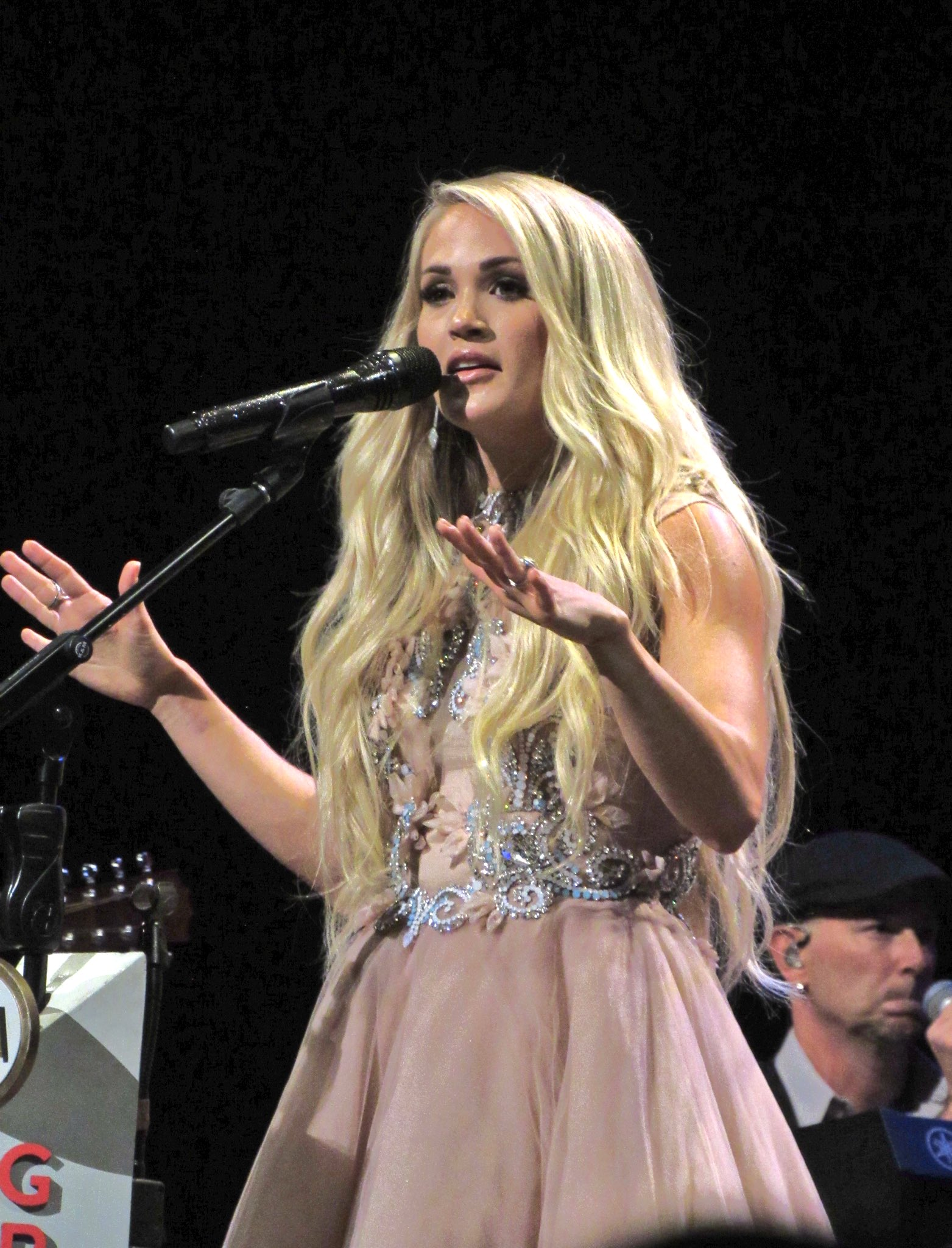
Five-time recipient Carrie Underwood.

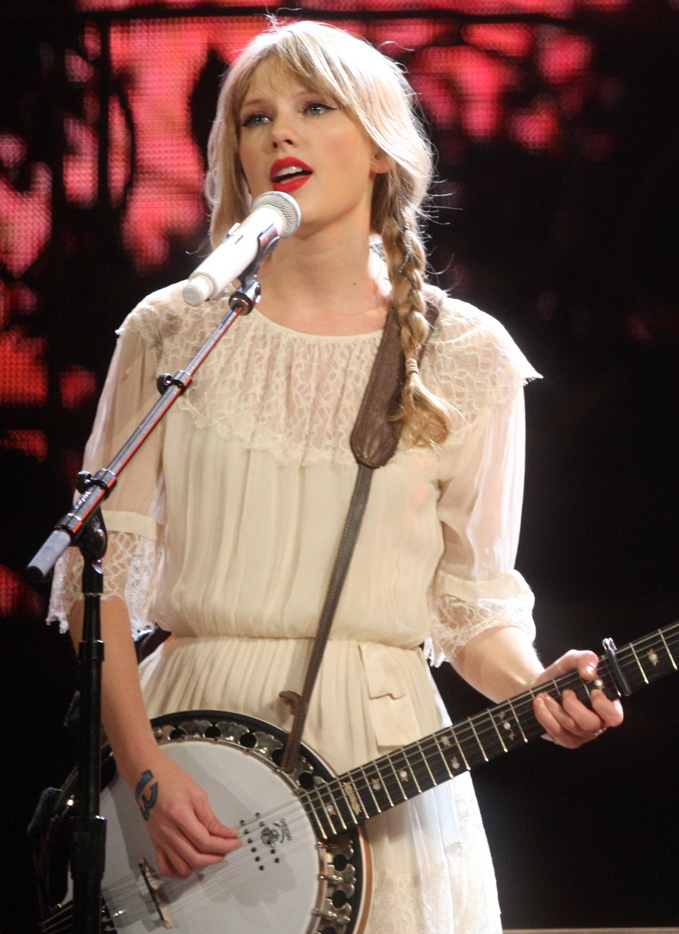
2009 honoree Taylor Swift has also won Entertainer of the Year twice.

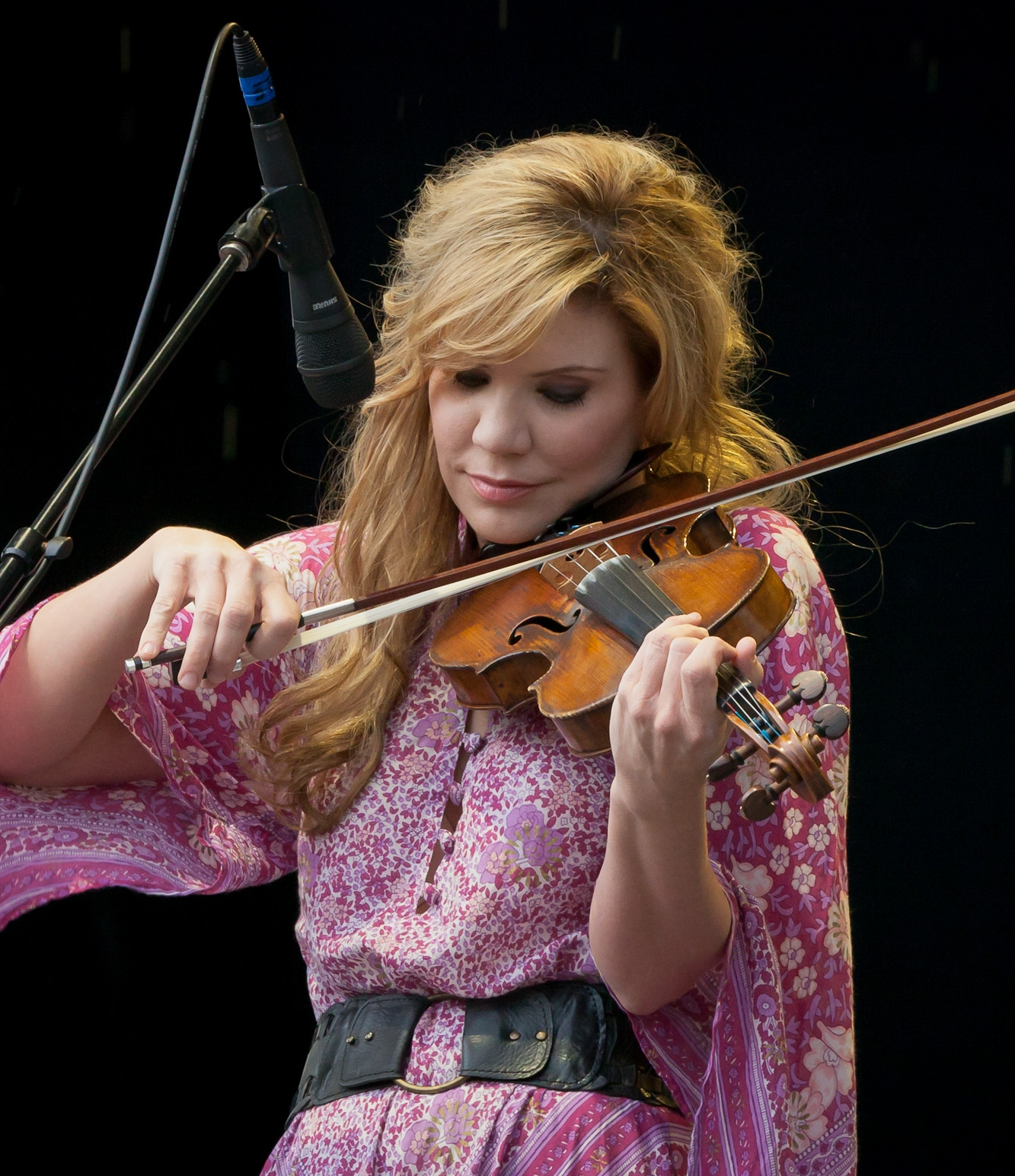
1995 honoree Alison Krauss.

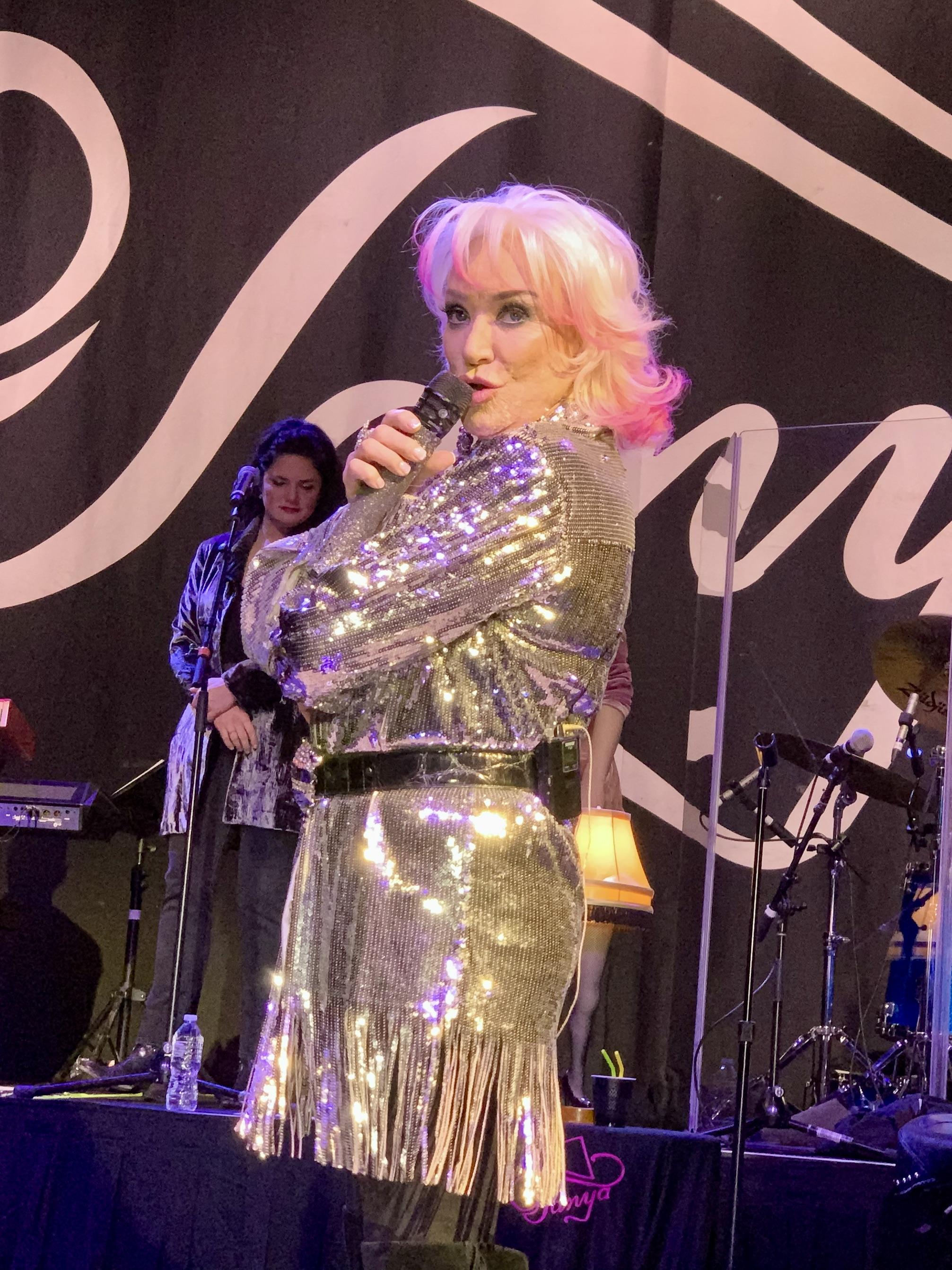
Tanya Tucker received the award in 1991.

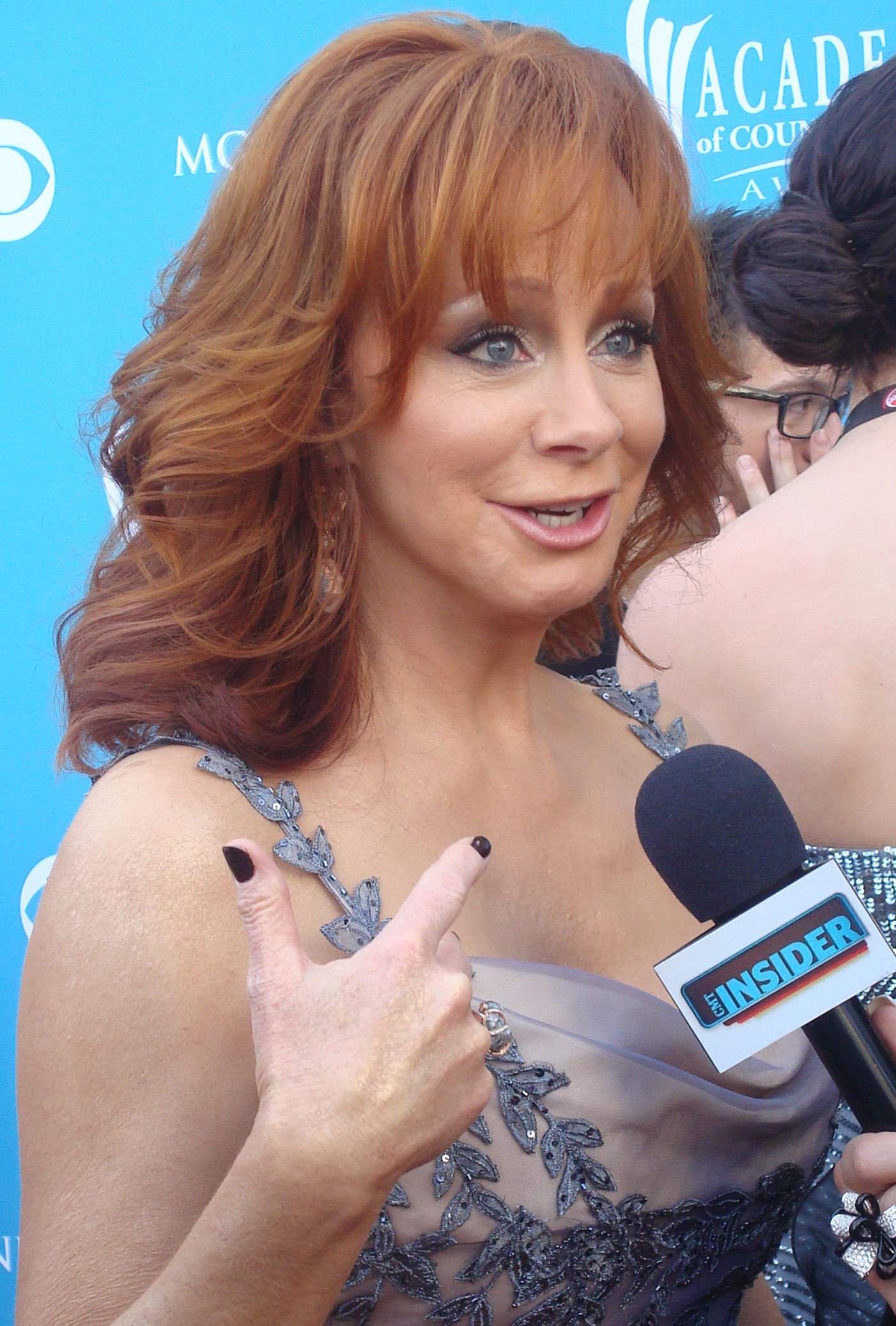
Four-time winner Reba McEntire.

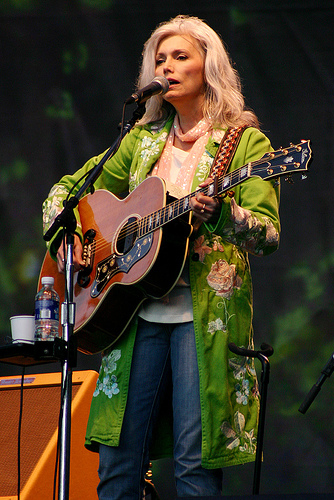
Eleven-time nominee and 1980 recipient Emmylou Harris.

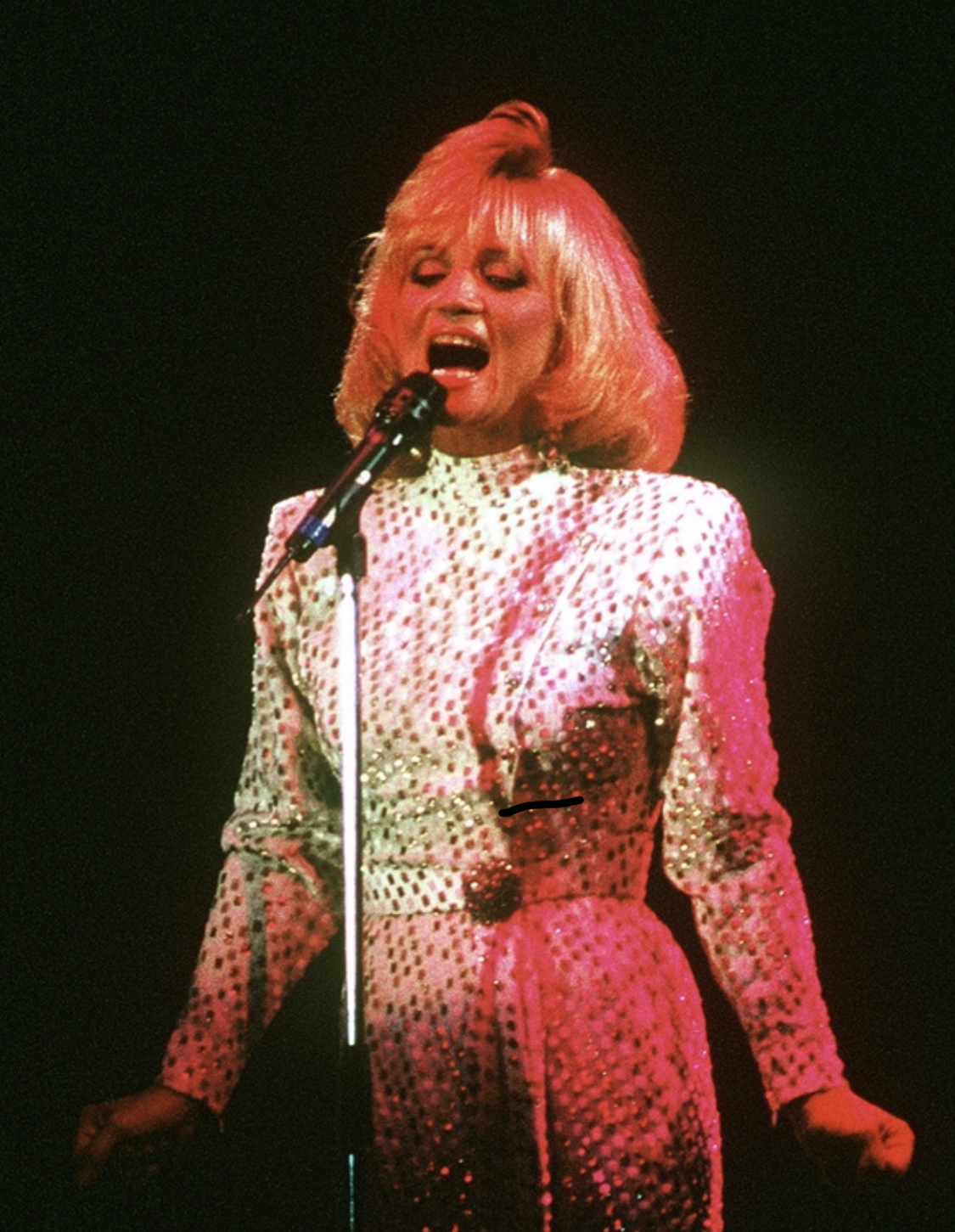
Barbara Mandrell won the award twice and was also the first person to win Entertainer of the Year twice.

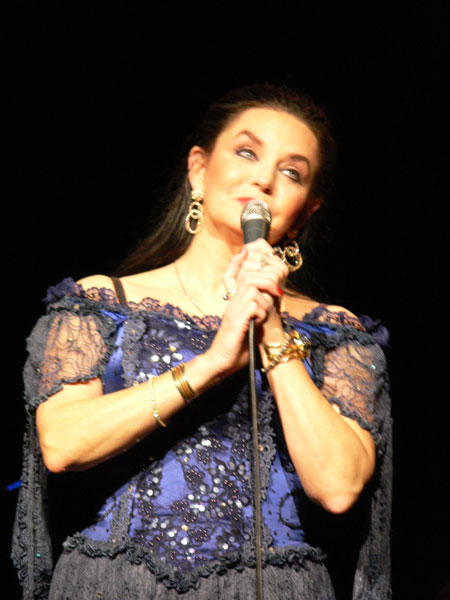
Crystal Gayle won the award back-to-back in 1977 and 1978.

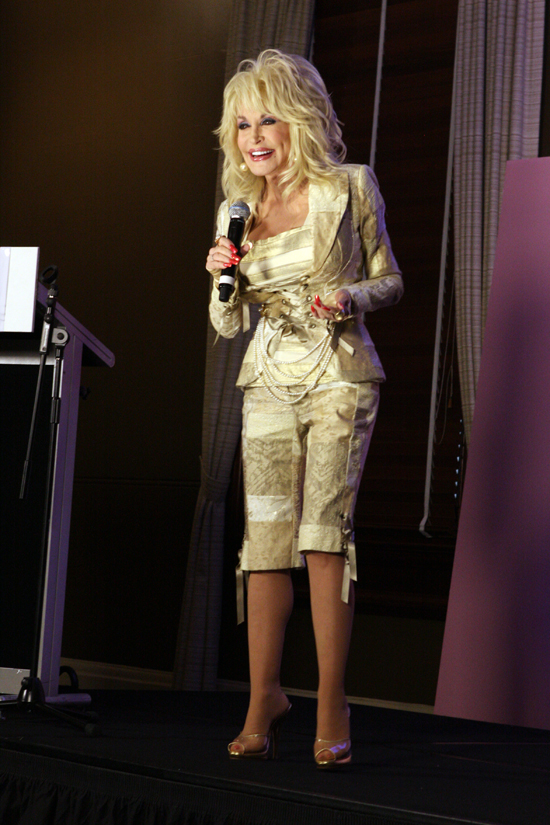
Two-time recipient Dolly Parton also won Entertainer of the Year in 1978.

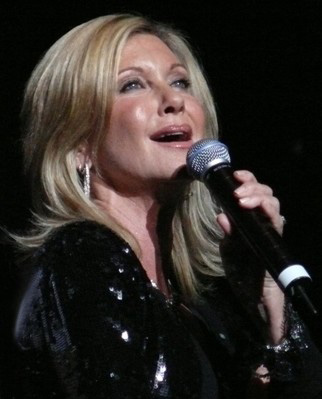
Olivia Newton-John controversially won the award in 1974 and is, to date, the only non-American female vocalist winner.

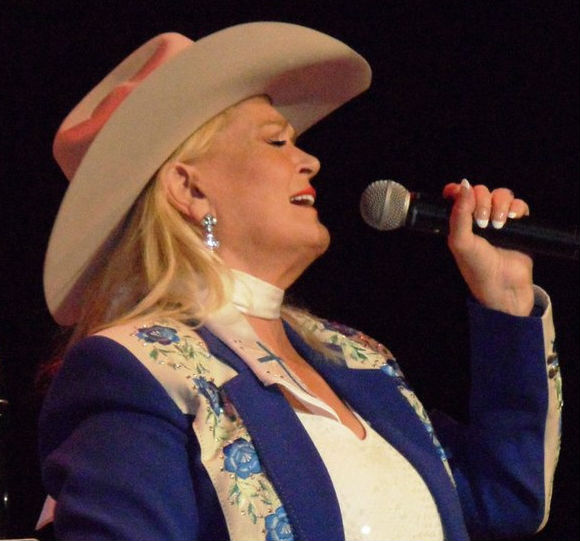
1971 winner Lynn Anderson.

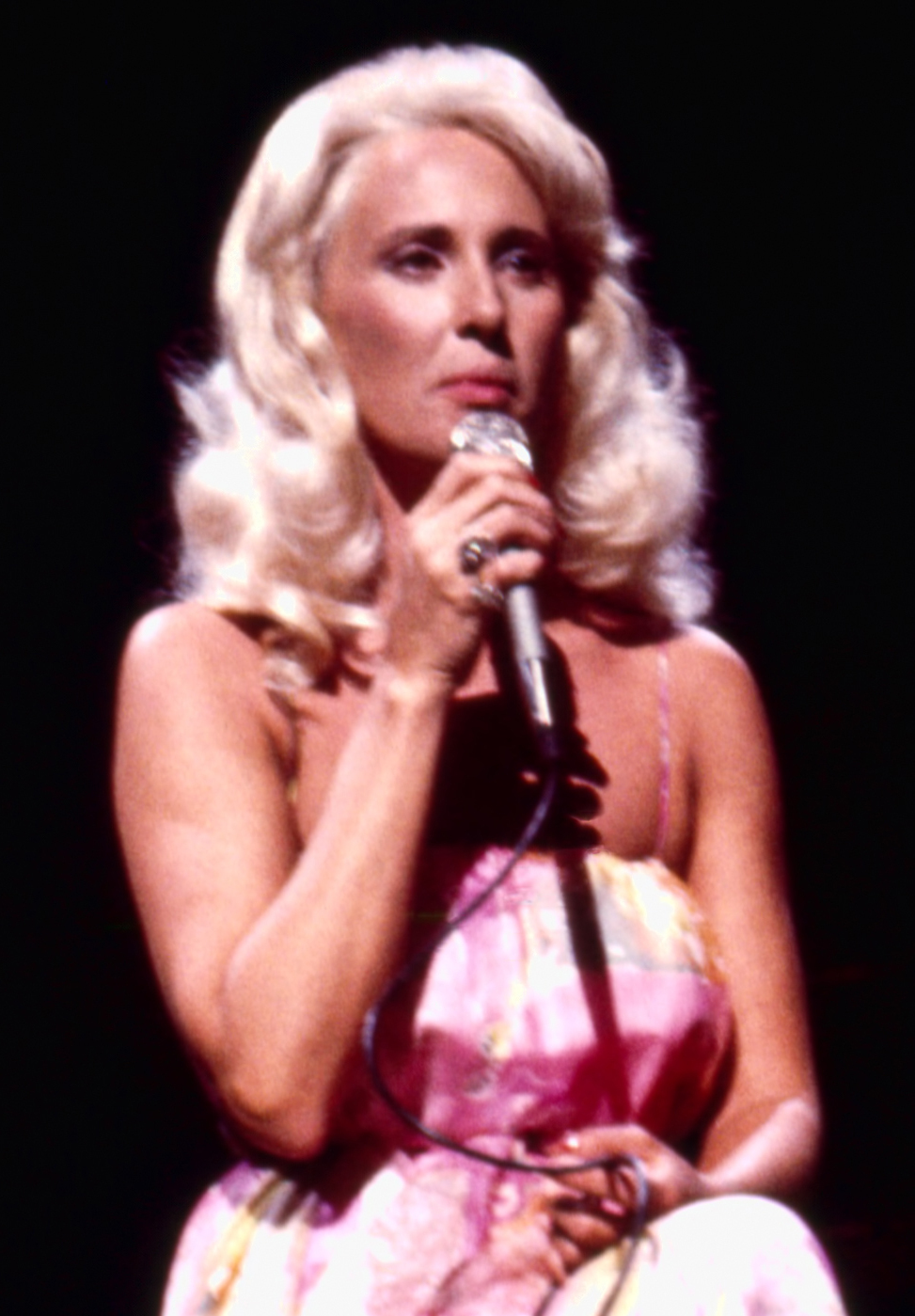
Three-time honoree Tammy Wynette.

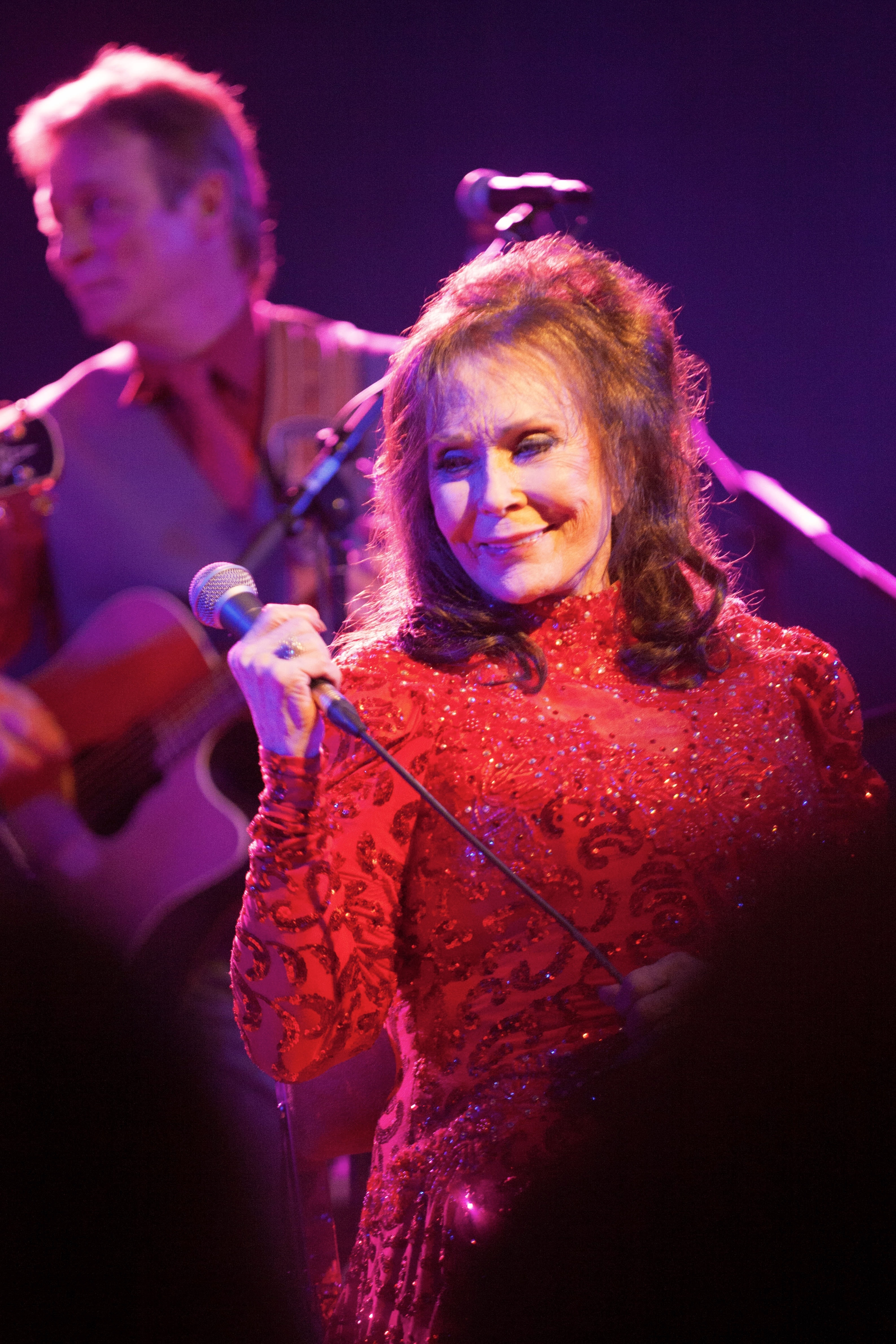
Loretta Lynn won the inaugural female vocalist award and later received it in 1972 and 1973

Year	Winner	Nominees
2026	Ella Langley	Miranda Lambert; Megan Moroney; Kacey Musgraves; Lainey Wilson
2025	Lainey Wilson	Kelsea Ballerini; Miranda Lambert; Ella Langley; Megan Moroney
2024	Lainey Wilson	Kelsea Ballerini; Ashley McBryde; Megan Moroney; Kacey Musgraves
2023	Lainey Wilson	Kelsea Ballerini; Miranda Lambert; Ashley McBryde; Carly Pearce
2022	Lainey Wilson	Miranda Lambert; Ashley McBryde; Carly Pearce; Carrie Underwood
2021	Carly Pearce	Gabby Barrett; Miranda Lambert; Ashley McBryde; Maren Morris
2020	Maren Morris	Miranda Lambert; Ashley McBryde; Kacey Musgraves; Carrie Underwood
2019	Kacey Musgraves	Kelsea Ballerini; Miranda Lambert; Maren Morris; Carrie Underwood
2018	Carrie Underwood	Kelsea Ballerini; Miranda Lambert; Maren Morris; Kacey Musgraves
2017	Miranda Lambert	Kelsea Ballerini; Reba McEntire; Maren Morris; Carrie Underwood
2016	Carrie Underwood	Kelsea Ballerini; Miranda Lambert; Maren Morris; Kacey Musgraves
2015	Miranda Lambert	Kelsea Ballerini; Kacey Musgraves; Carrie Underwood; Lee Ann Womack
2014	Miranda Lambert	Martina McBride; Kacey Musgraves; Taylor Swift; Carrie Underwood
2013	Miranda Lambert	Kelly Clarkson; Kacey Musgraves; Taylor Swift; Carrie Underwood
2012	Miranda Lambert	Kelly Clarkson; Martina McBride; Taylor Swift; Carrie Underwood
2011	Miranda Lambert	Sara Evans; Martina McBride; Taylor Swift; Carrie Underwood
2010	Miranda Lambert	Martina McBride; Reba McEntire; Taylor Swift; Carrie Underwood
2009	Taylor Swift	Miranda Lambert; Martina McBride; Reba McEntire; Carrie Underwood
2008	Carrie Underwood	Alison Krauss; Miranda Lambert; Martina McBride; Taylor Swift
2007	Carrie Underwood	Alison Krauss; Miranda Lambert; Martina McBride; Reba McEntire
2006	Carrie Underwood	Sara Evans; Faith Hill; Martina McBride; Gretchen Wilson
2005	Gretchen Wilson	Sara Evans; Alison Krauss; Martina McBride; Lee Ann Womack
2004	Martina McBride	Terri Clark; Sara Evans; Alison Krauss; Reba McEntire
2003	Martina McBride	Terri Clark; Alison Krauss; Patty Loveless; Dolly Parton
2002	Martina McBride	Sara Evans; Alison Krauss; Lee Ann Womack; Trisha Yearwood
2001	Lee Ann Womack	Sara Evans; Faith Hill; Martina McBride; Trisha Yearwood
2000	Faith Hill	Martina McBride; Jo Dee Messina; Lee Ann Womack; Trisha Yearwood
1999	Martina McBride	Faith Hill; Jo Dee Messina; Shania Twain; Trisha Yearwood
1998	Trisha Yearwood	Faith Hill; Patty Loveless; Martina McBride; Lee Ann Womack
1997	Trisha Yearwood	Deana Carter; Patty Loveless; LeAnn Rimes; Pam Tillis
1996	Patty Loveless	Faith Hill; Martina McBride; Pam Tillis; Shania Twain
1995	Alison Krauss	Mary Chapin Carpenter; Patty Loveless; Reba McEntire; Pam Tillis
1994	Pam Tillis	Mary Chapin Carpenter; Reba McEntire; Wynonna Judd; Trisha Yearwood
1993	Mary Chapin Carpenter	Reba McEntire; Pam Tillis; Tanya Tucker; Wynonna Judd
1992	Mary Chapin Carpenter	Reba McEntire; Tanya Tucker; Wynonna Judd; Trisha Yearwood
1991	Tanya Tucker	Patty Loveless; Kathy Mattea; Reba McEntire; Lorrie Morgan
1990	Kathy Mattea	Patty Loveless; Reba McEntire; Lorrie Morgan; Tanya Tucker
1989	Kathy Mattea	Rosanne Cash; Patty Loveless; Reba McEntire; Tanya Tucker
1988	K.T. Oslin	Rosanne Cash; Kathy Mattea; Reba McEntire; Tanya Tucker
1987	Reba McEntire	Rosanne Cash; Emmylou Harris; Kathy Mattea; Dolly Parton
1986	Reba McEntire	Rosanne Cash; Janie Fricke; Emmylou Harris; Anne Murray
1985	Reba McEntire	Rosanne Cash; Janie Fricke; Emmylou Harris; Anne Murray
1984	Reba McEntire	Janie Fricke; Emmylou Harris; Barbara Mandrell; Anne Murray
1983	Janie Fricke	Lacy J. Dalton; Emmylou Harris; Barbara Mandrell; Reba McEntire
1982	Janie Fricke	Rosanne Cash; Emmylou Harris; Barbara Mandrell; Juice Newton
1981	Barbara Mandrell	Terri Gibbs; Emmylou Harris; Loretta Lynn; Anne Murray
1980	Emmylou Harris	Crystal Gayle; Loretta Lynn; Barbara Mandrell; Anne Murray
1979	Barbara Mandrell	Janie Fricke; Crystal Gayle; Emmylou Harris; Anne Murray
1978	Crystal Gayle	Janie Fricke; Emmylou Harris; Barbara Mandrell; Dolly Parton
1977	Crystal Gayle	Emmylou Harris; Loretta Lynn; Barbara Mandrell; Dolly Parton
1976	Dolly Parton	Crystal Gayle; Emmylou Harris; Barbara Mandrell; Tammy Wynette
1975	Dolly Parton	Jessi Colter; Loretta Lynn; Linda Ronstadt; Tanya Tucker
1974	Olivia Newton-John	Loretta Lynn; Anne Murray; Dolly Parton; Tanya Tucker
1973	Loretta Lynn	Donna Fargo; Jeanne Pruett; Tanya Tucker; Tammy Wynette
1972	Loretta Lynn	Donna Fargo; Dolly Parton; Connie Smith; Tammy Wynette
1971	Lynn Anderson	Loretta Lynn; Dolly Parton; Sammi Smith; Tammy Wynette
1970	Tammy Wynette	Lynn Anderson; Loretta Lynn; Dolly Parton; Connie Smith
1969	Tammy Wynette	Lynn Anderson; Loretta Lynn; Dolly Parton; Jeannie C. Riley
1968	Tammy Wynette	Lynn Anderson; Loretta Lynn; Dolly Parton; Jeannie C. Riley
1967	Loretta Lynn	Lynn Anderson; Connie Smith; Dottie West; Tammy Wynette

== Artists with multiple wins ==
Artists that received multiple awards
Awards	Artist
7	Miranda Lambert
5	Carrie Underwood
4	Martina McBride
4	Reba McEntire
4	Lainey Wilson
3	Loretta Lynn
3	Tammy Wynette
2	Barbara Mandrell
2	Crystal Gayle
2	Dolly Parton
2	Janie Frickie
2	Kathy Mattea
2	Mary Chapin Carpenter
2	Trisha Yearwood

=== Won on First nomination ===
In CMA history only nine women have won Female Vocalist of the Year the very first time they were nominated. They are:

- Loretta Lynn (1967)
- Olivia Newton-John (1974)
- K.T. Oslin (1988)
- Mary Chapin Carpenter (1992)
- Alison Krauss (1995)
- Gretchen Wilson (2005)
- Carrie Underwood (2006)
- Carly Pearce (2021)
- Lainey Wilson (2022)

== Artists with multiple nominations ==
19 nominations

- Miranda Lambert

18 nominations

- Reba McEntire

17 nominations

- Martina McBride

16 nominations

- Carrie Underwood

12 nominations

- Dolly Parton
- Emmylou Harris
- Loretta Lynn

9 nominations

- Barbara Mandrell
- Tanya Tucker
- Kacey Musgraves
- Kelsea Ballerini

8 nominations

- Patty Loveless
- Tammy Wynette
- Trisha Yearwood

7 nominations

- Alison Krauss
- Anne Murray
- Janie Frickie
- Taylor Swift

6 nominations

- Faith Hill
- Lee Ann Womack
- Maren Morris
- Rosanne Cash
- Sara Evans

5 nominations

- Ashley McBryde
- Crystal Gayle
- Kathy Mattea
- Lainey Wilson
- Lynn Anderson
- Pam Tillis

4 nominations

- Mary Chapin Carpenter

3 nominations

- Carly Pearce
- Connie Smith
- Wynonna Judd
- Megan Moroney

2 nominations

- Donna Fargo
- Gretchen Wilson
- Jeannie C. Riley
- Jo Dee Messina
- Kelly Clarkson
- Terri Clark
- Lorrie Morgan
- Shania Twain
- Ella Langley

== See also ==
- Country Music Association Awards
