= Country Music Association Award for Entertainer of the Year =

Annual American country music award

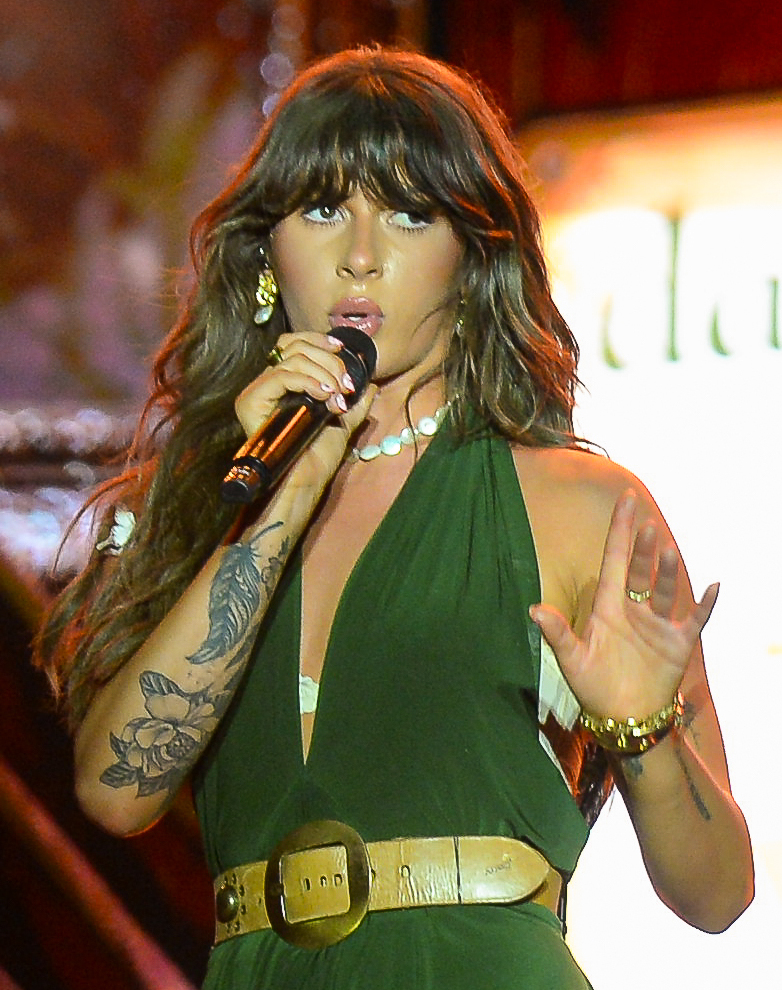
- Ella Langley, reigning Entertainer of the Year
- Country: United States
- Presented by: Country Music Association
- First award: 1967
- Currently held by: Ella Langley (2026)

The Country Music Association Awards is a major awards show in country music, with the highest honor being the award for Entertainer of the Year. It is the final award presented at the ceremony and recognizes the artist "displaying the greatest competence in all aspects of the entertainment field", with consideration to not only recorded performance but also "in-person performance, public acceptance, leadership, and overall contribution to country music" they have exhibited throughout the eligibility period. It is generally considered the highest competitive honor presented at the CMA Awards.

The inaugural recipient of the award was Eddy Arnold in 1967, with Loretta Lynn becoming the first female winner in 1972, and Alabama being the first group awarded in 1982. Garth Brooks holds the record for most wins in the category, with seven, while three-time recipient George Strait has a leading nineteen nominations. To date, Barbara Mandrell, Taylor Swift, and Lainey Wilson are the only women to have won twice. Chris Stapleton holds the record for most nominations without a win, with nine. The current holder of the award is Ella Langley, who won in 2026.

== Recipients ==
In the following tables, the years correspond to the date of the ceremony. Artists are eligible based on their work of the previous calendar year. Entries with a blue ribbon next to the artist's name have won the award; those with a white background are the nominees on the short-list.

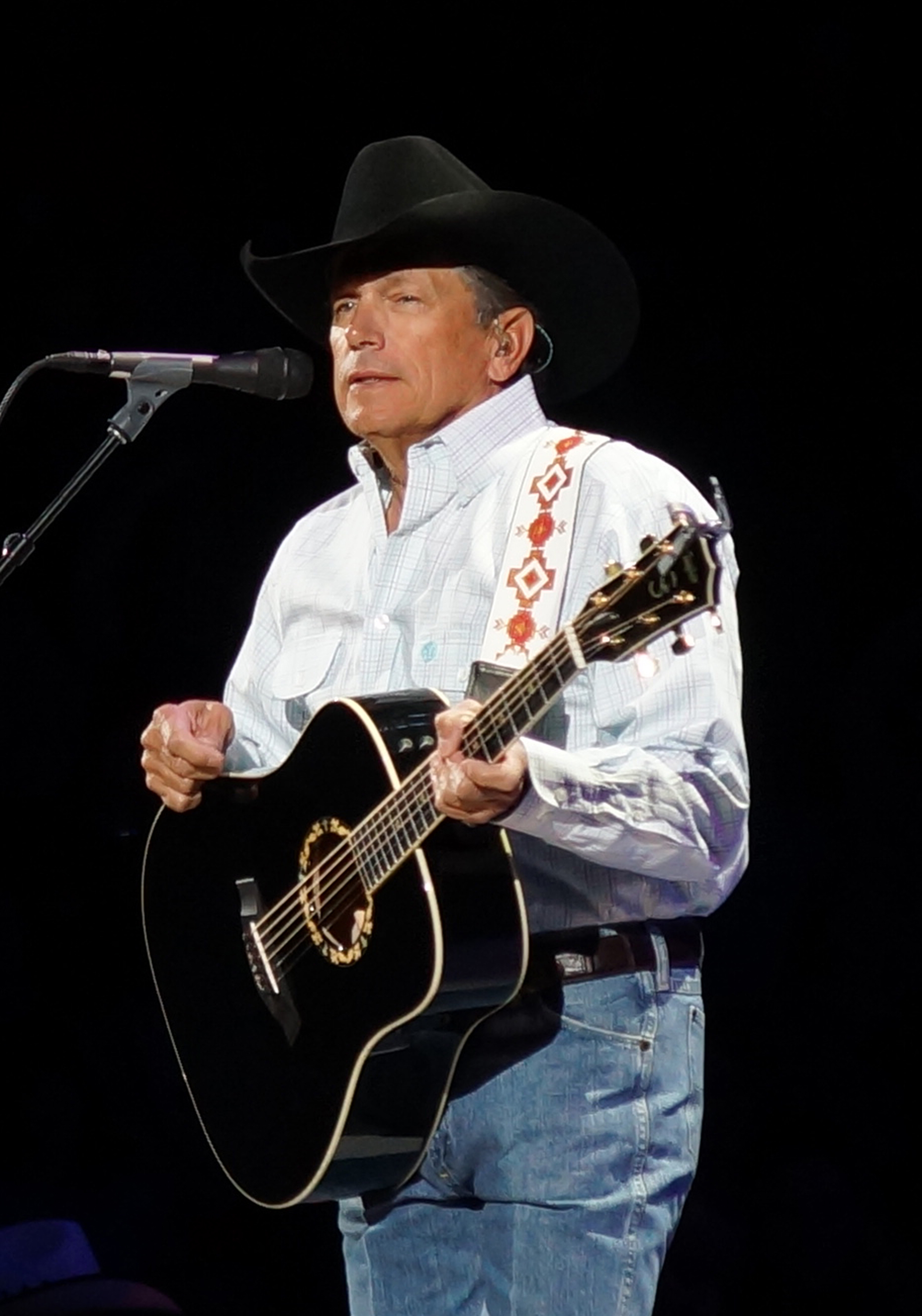
George Strait received the award in 1989, 1990 and 2013.

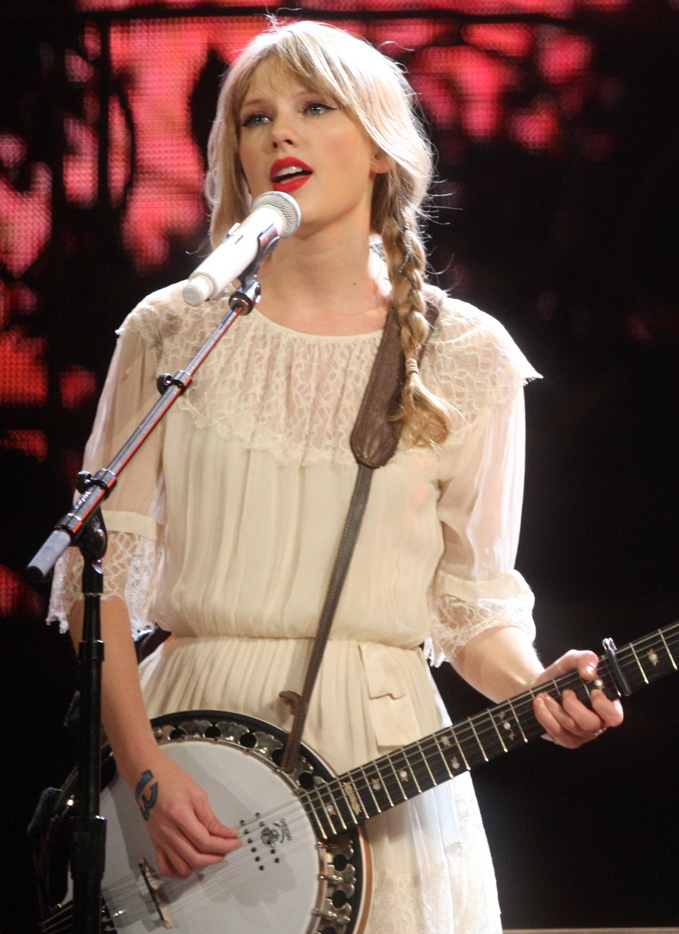
Taylor Swift is the youngest artist and second woman to win twice.

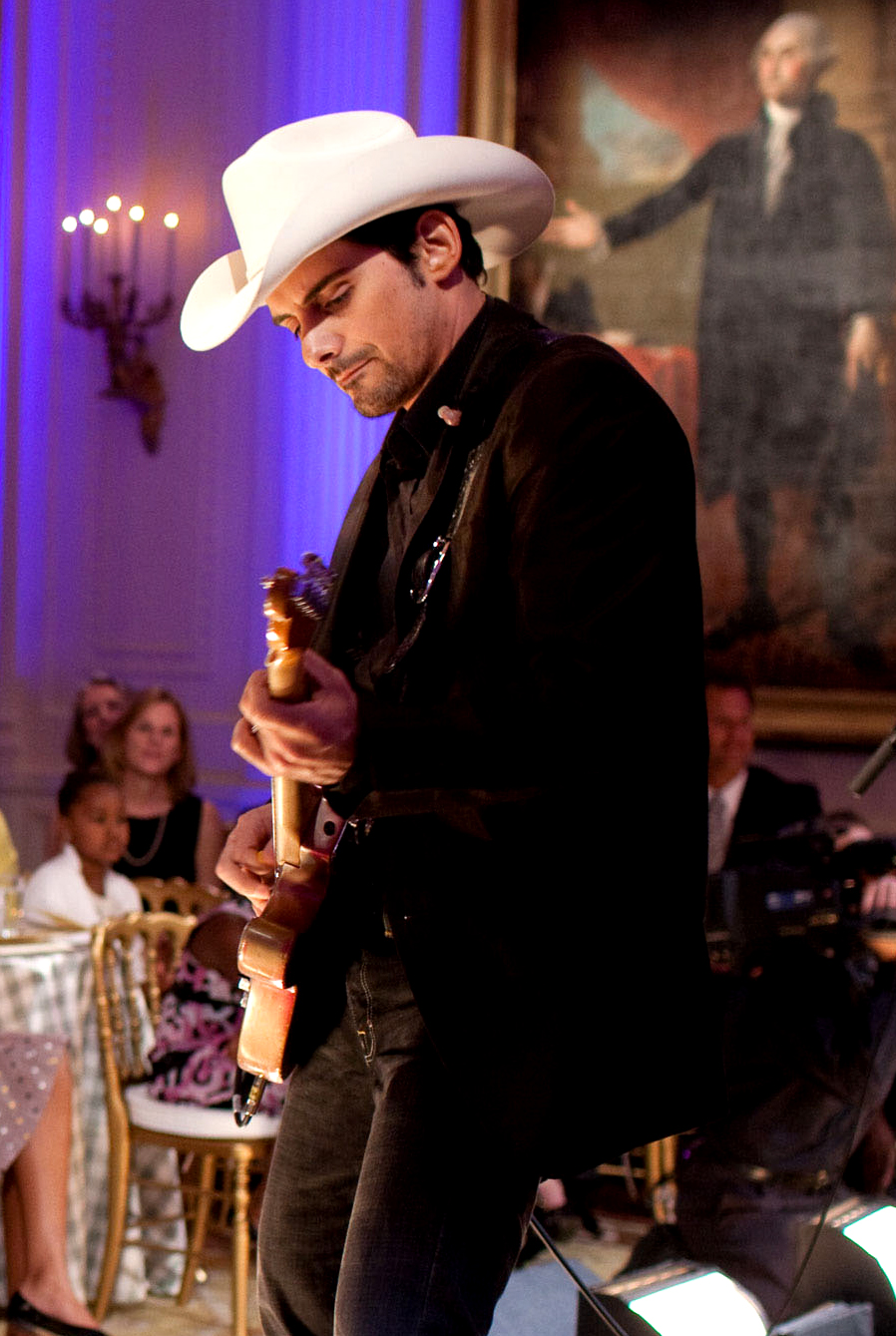
Brad Paisley received the honor in 2010.

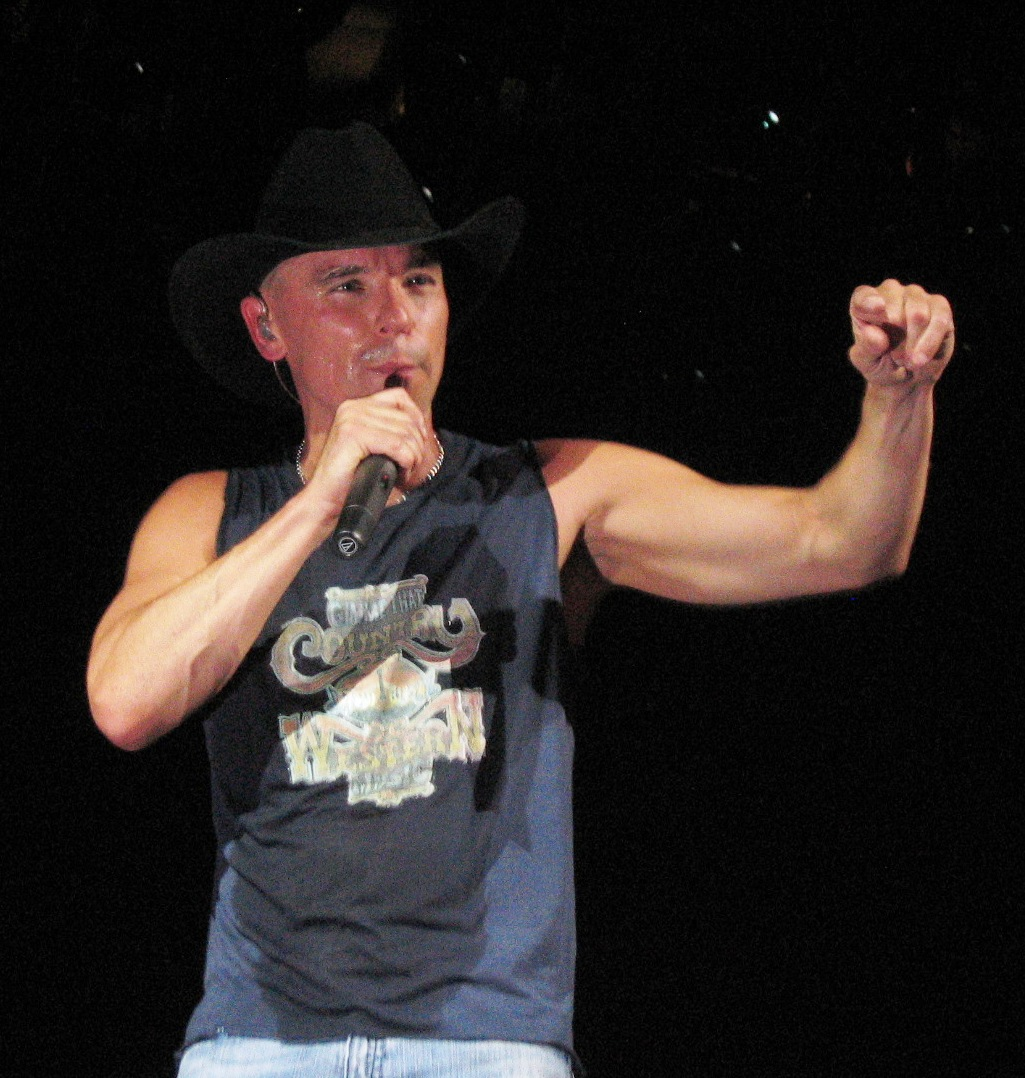
Four-time recipient Kenny Chesney

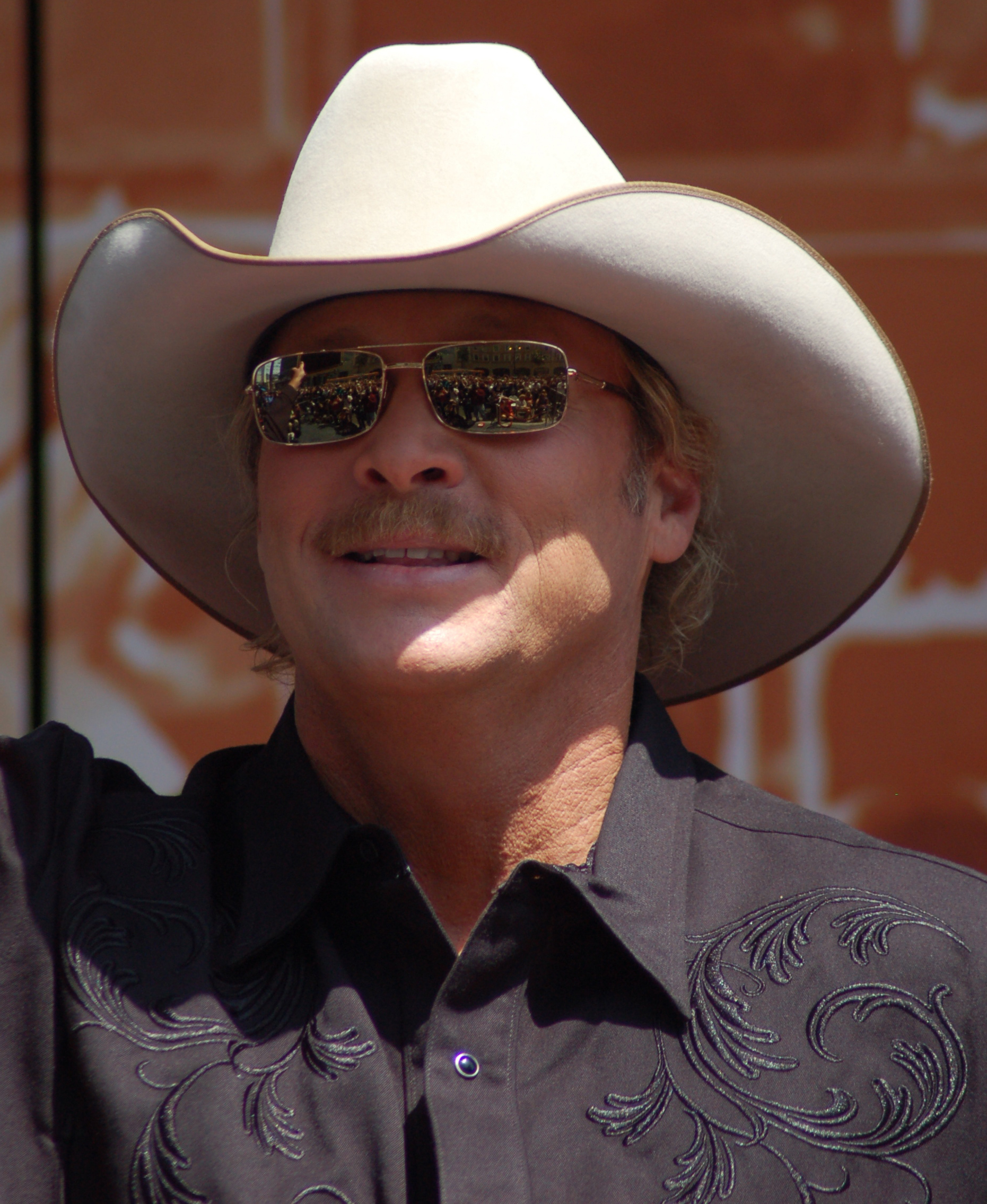
Back-to-back winner Alan Jackson

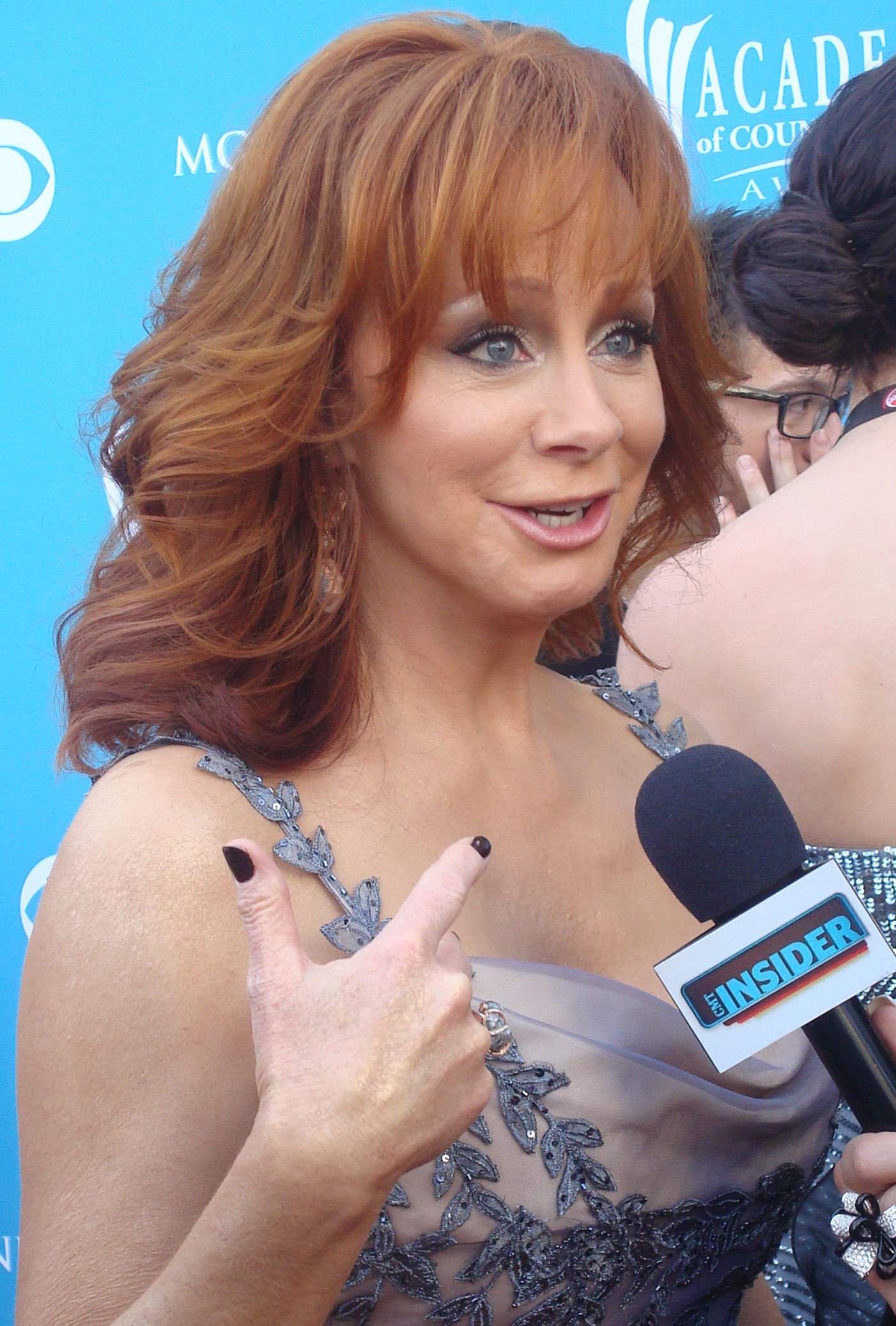
1986 winner Reba McEntire, and most nominated Female Artist

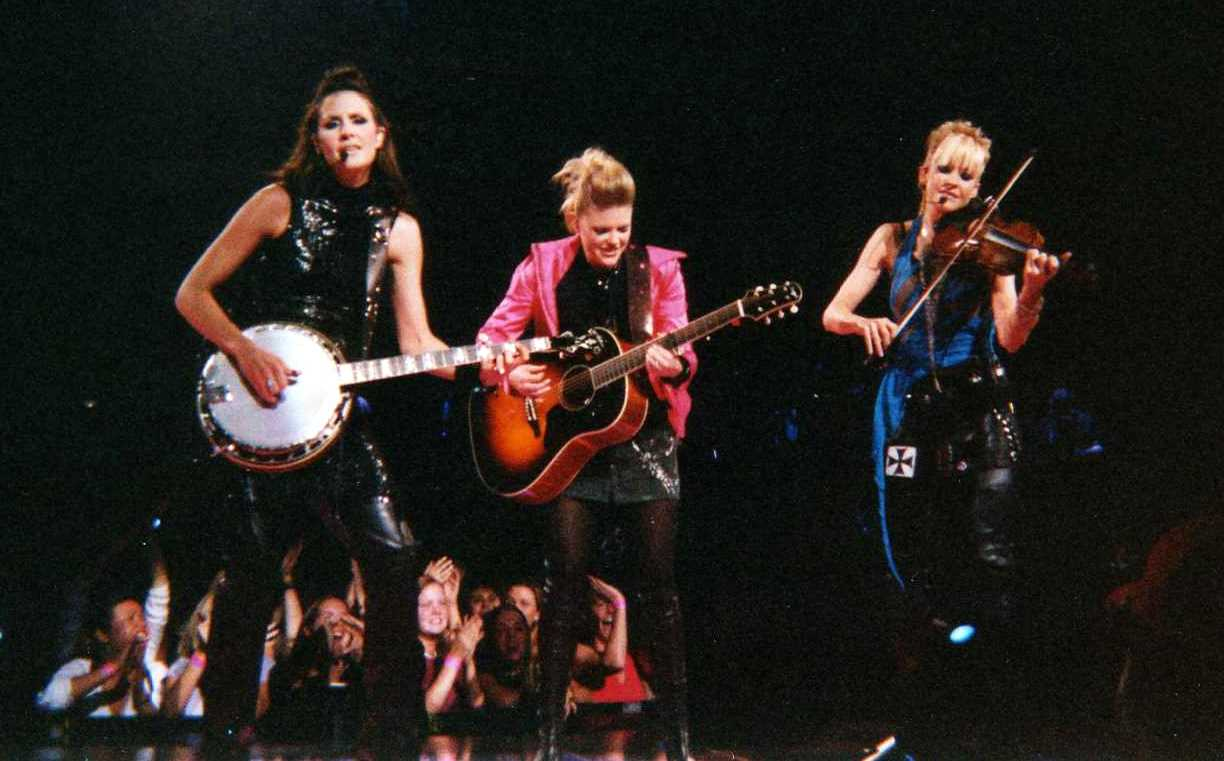
The Dixie Chicks are the only female group to be crowned.

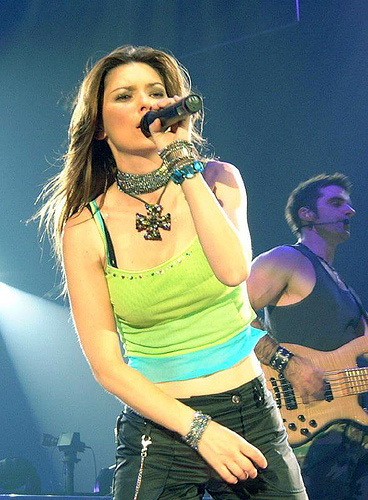
Shania Twain was the first non-American winner.

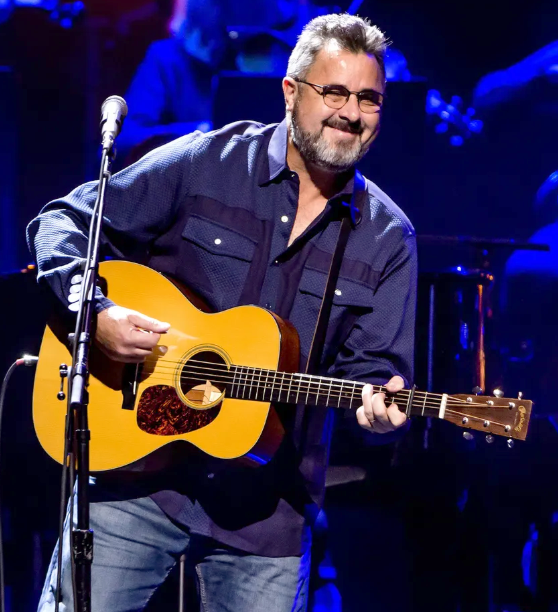
Two-time recipient Vince Gill is also a five-time male vocalist.

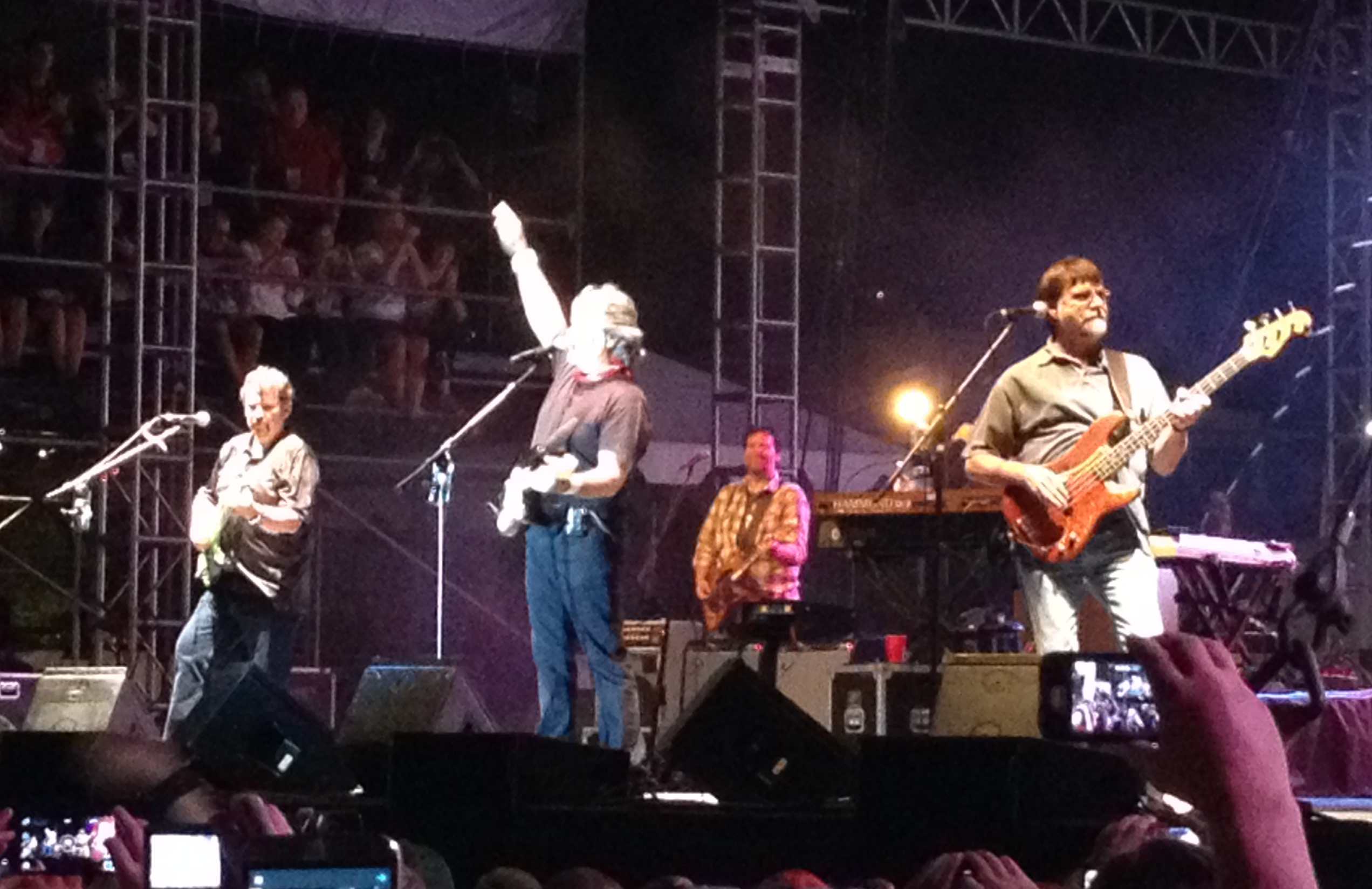
Alabama have received the honor three times.

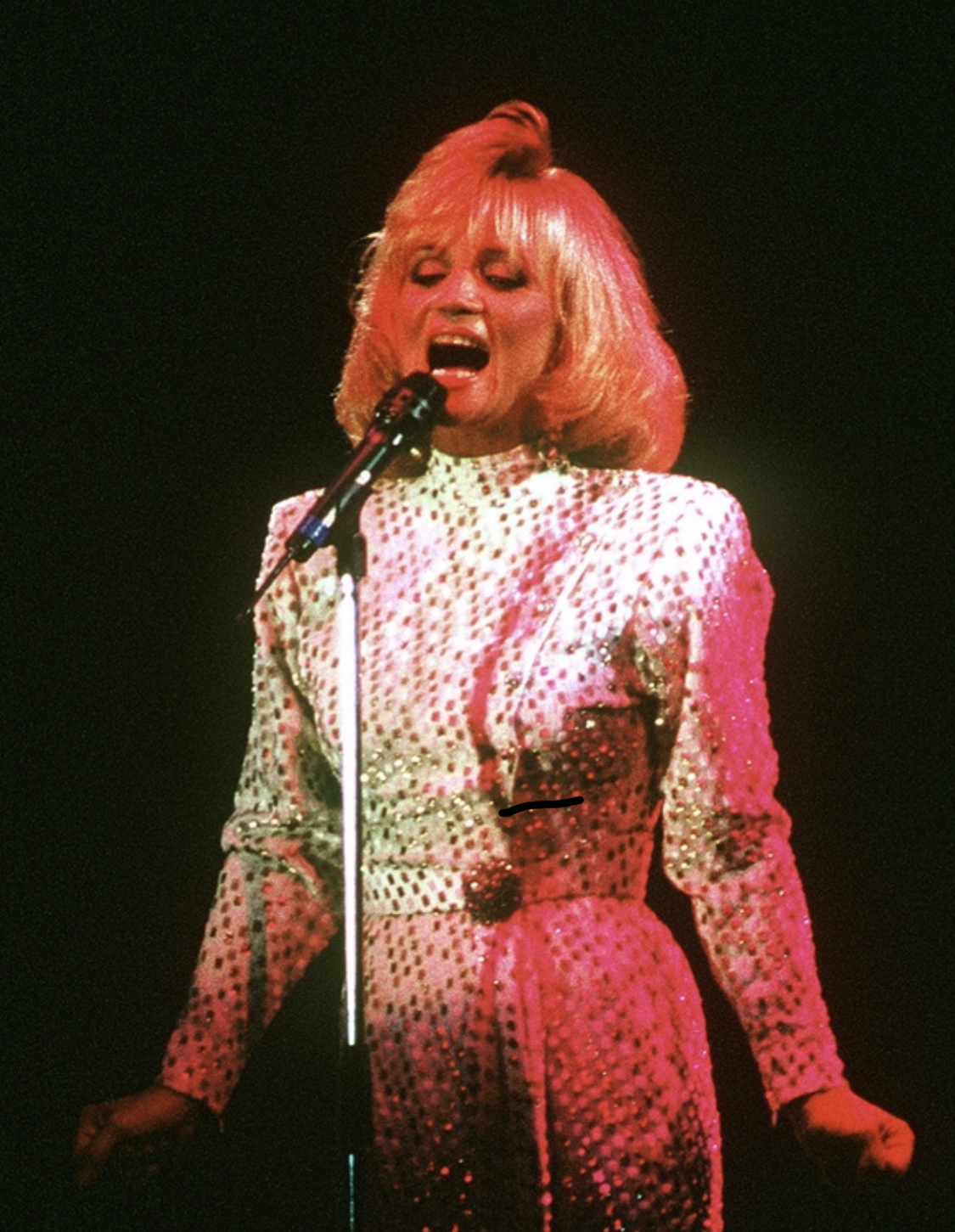
Barbara Mandrell is the first person to win twice.

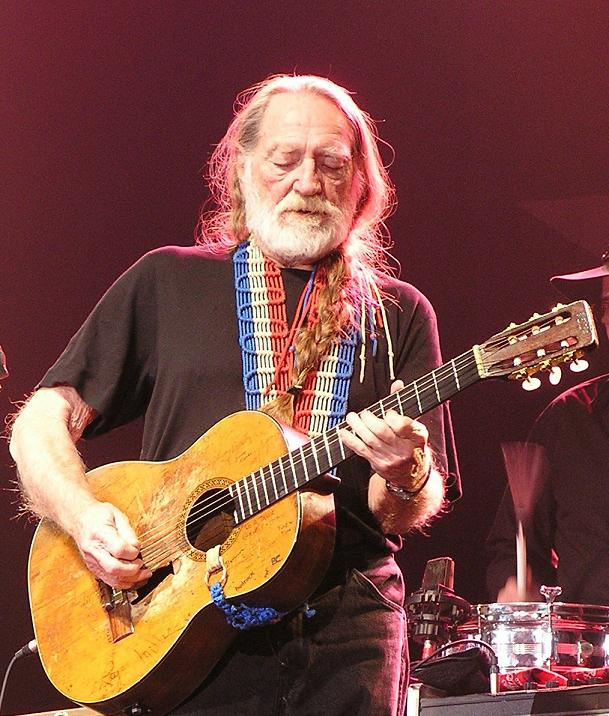
1979 recipient Willie Nelson

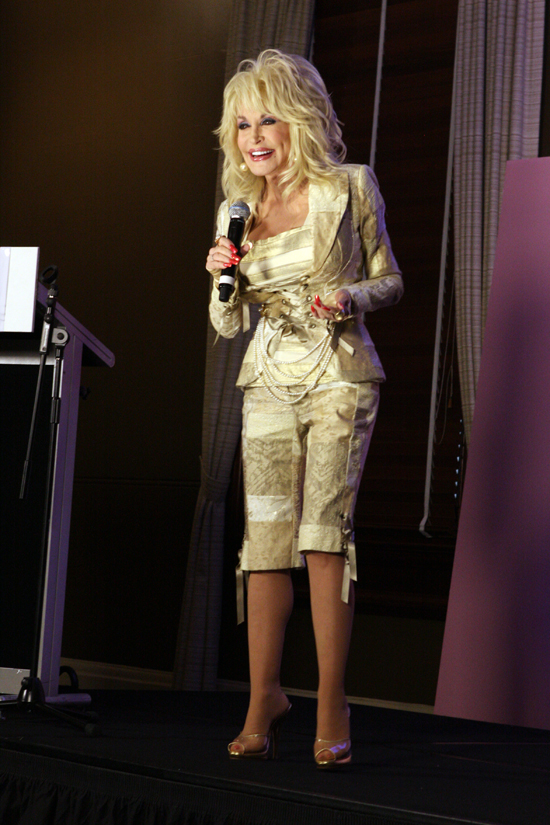
1978 entertainer of the year Dolly Parton is also a two-time female vocalist.

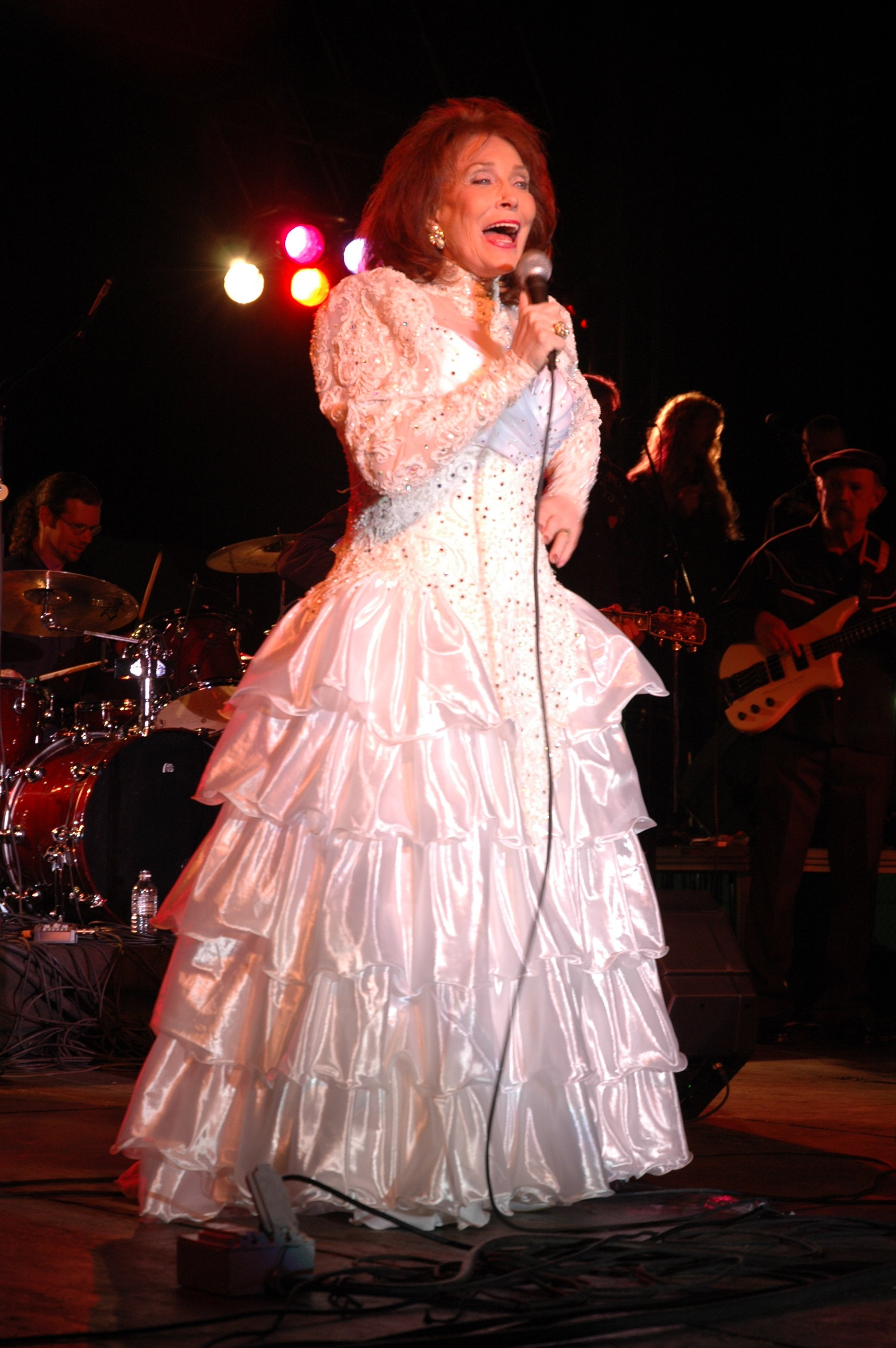
Loretta Lynn is the first woman to win entertainer of the year.

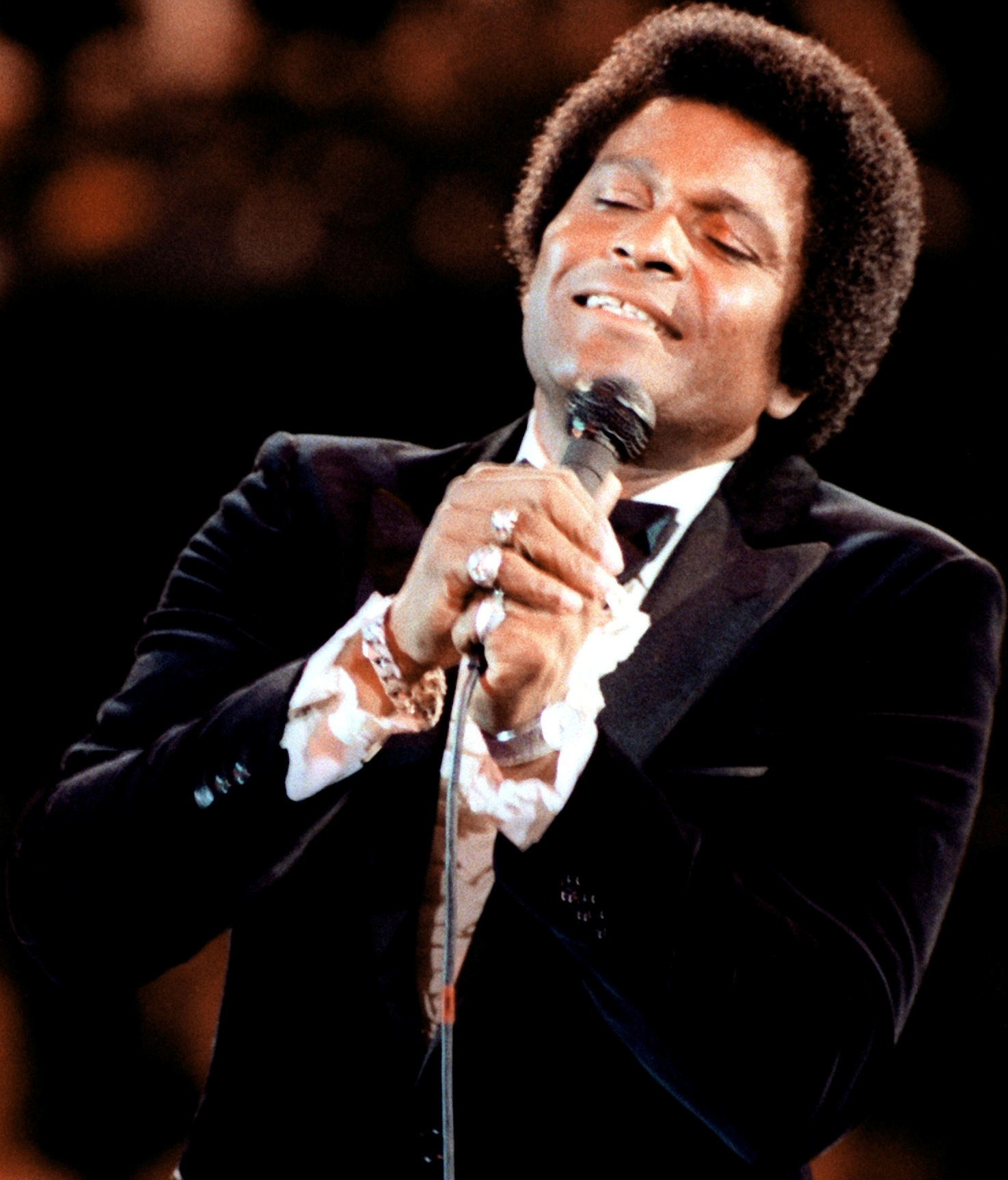
1971 recipient Charley Pride is the only person of color to win Entertainer of the year.

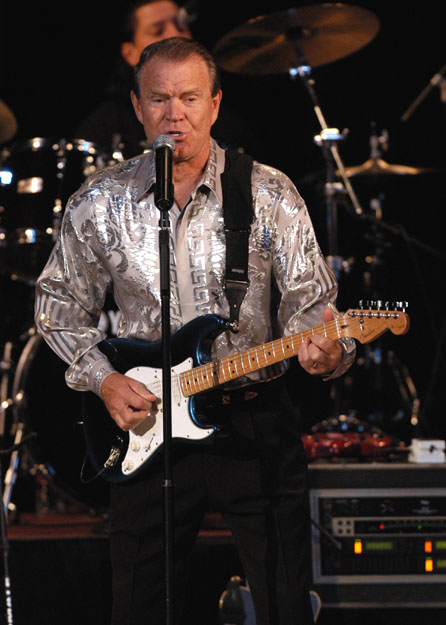
1968 recipient Glen Campbell

Year	Winner	Nominees
2026	Ella Langley	Luke Combs; Cody Johnson; Chris Stapleton; Lainey Wilson
2025	Lainey Wilson	Luke Combs; Cody Johnson; Chris Stapleton; Morgan Wallen
2024	Morgan Wallen	Luke Combs; Jelly Roll; Chris Stapleton; Lainey Wilson
2023	Lainey Wilson	Luke Combs; Chris Stapleton; Morgan Wallen; Carrie Underwood
2022	Luke Combs	Miranda Lambert; Chris Stapleton; Carrie Underwood; Morgan Wallen
2021	Luke Combs	Eric Church; Miranda Lambert; Chris Stapleton; Carrie Underwood
2020	Eric Church	Luke Combs; Miranda Lambert; Carrie Underwood; Keith Urban
2019	Garth Brooks	Eric Church; Chris Stapleton; Carrie Underwood; Keith Urban
2018	Keith Urban	Jason Aldean; Luke Bryan; Kenny Chesney; Chris Stapleton
2017	Garth Brooks	Luke Bryan; Eric Church; Chris Stapleton; Keith Urban
2016	Garth Brooks	Luke Bryan; Chris Stapleton; Carrie Underwood; Keith Urban
2015	Luke Bryan	Garth Brooks; Miranda Lambert; Eric Church; Kenny Chesney
2014	Luke Bryan	Miranda Lambert; Blake Shelton; George Strait; Keith Urban
2013	George Strait	Jason Aldean; Luke Bryan; Blake Shelton; Taylor Swift
2012	Blake Shelton	Jason Aldean; Kenny Chesney; Brad Paisley; Taylor Swift
2011	Taylor Swift	Jason Aldean; Brad Paisley; Blake Shelton; Keith Urban
2010	Brad Paisley	Lady Antebellum; Miranda Lambert; Keith Urban; Zac Brown Band
2009	Taylor Swift	Kenny Chesney; Brad Paisley; George Strait; Keith Urban
2008	Kenny Chesney	Brad Paisley; George Strait; Sugarland; Keith Urban
2007	Kenny Chesney	Brad Paisley; Rascal Flatts; George Strait; Keith Urban
2006	Kenny Chesney	Brooks & Dunn; Brad Paisley; Rascal Flatts; Keith Urban
2005	Keith Urban	Kenny Chesney; Alan Jackson; Toby Keith; Brad Paisley
2004	Kenny Chesney	Brooks & Dunn; Alan Jackson; Toby Keith; Tim McGraw
2003	Alan Jackson	Brooks & Dunn; Kenny Chesney; Toby Keith; Tim McGraw
2002	Alan Jackson	Brooks & Dunn; Kenny Chesney; Toby Keith; George Strait
2001	Tim McGraw	Brooks & Dunn; Dixie Chicks; Alan Jackson; George Strait
2000	Dixie Chicks	Faith Hill; Alan Jackson; Tim McGraw; George Strait
1999	Shania Twain	Garth Brooks; Dixie Chicks; Tim McGraw; George Strait
1998	Garth Brooks	Brooks & Dunn; Vince Gill; Tim McGraw; George Strait
1997	Garth Brooks	Brooks & Dunn; Vince Gill; Alan Jackson; George Strait
1996	Brooks & Dunn	Garth Brooks; Vince Gill; Alan Jackson; George Strait
1995	Alan Jackson	Brooks & Dunn; Garth Brooks; Vince Gill; Reba McEntire
1994	Vince Gill	Brooks & Dunn; Garth Brooks; Alan Jackson; Reba McEntire
1993	Vince Gill	Brooks & Dunn; Garth Brooks; Alan Jackson; Reba McEntire
1992	Garth Brooks	Vince Gill; Alan Jackson; Reba McEntire; Travis Tritt
1991	Garth Brooks	Clint Black; Vince Gill; Reba McEntire; George Strait
1990	George Strait	Clint Black; Kathy Mattea; Ricky Van Shelton; Randy Travis
1989	George Strait	Reba McEntire; Randy Travis; Ricky Van Shelton; Hank Williams, Jr.
1988	Hank Williams, Jr.	The Judds; Reba McEntire; George Strait; Randy Travis
1987	Hank Williams, Jr.	The Judds; Reba McEntire; George Strait; Randy Travis
1986	Reba McEntire	The Judds; Willie Nelson; Ricky Skaggs; George Strait
1985	Ricky Skaggs	Alabama; Lee Greenwood; Reba McEntire; George Strait
1984	Alabama	Lee Greenwood; Barbara Mandrell; Ronnie Milsap; Oak Ridge Boys
1983	Alabama	Merle Haggard; Barbara Mandrell; Willie Nelson; Ricky Skaggs
1982	Alabama	Barbara Mandrell; Willie Nelson; Oak Ridge Boys; Ricky Skaggs
1981	Barbara Mandrell	Alabama; George Jones; Oak Ridge Boys; Kenny Rogers
1980	Barbara Mandrell	Charlie Daniels Band; Larry Gatlin & The Gatlin Brothers; Willie Nelson; Kenny Rogers
1979	Willie Nelson	Crystal Gayle; Barbara Mandrell; Kenny Rogers; Statler Brothers
1978	Dolly Parton	Crystal Gayle; Ronnie Milsap; Kenny Rogers; Mel Tillis
1977	Ronnie Milsap	Merle Haggard; Waylon Jennings; Dolly Parton; Kenny Rogers
1976	Mel Tillis	Waylon Jennings; Ronnie Milsap; Willie Nelson; Dolly Parton
1975	John Denver	Waylon Jennings; Loretta Lynn; Ronnie Milsap; Conway Twitty
1974	Charlie Rich	Roy Clark; Mac Davis; Loretta Lynn; Olivia Newton-John
1973	Roy Clark	Merle Haggard; Tom T. Hall; Loretta Lynn; Charley Pride
1972	Loretta Lynn	Merle Haggard; Freddie Hart; Charley Pride; Jerry Reed
1971	Charley Pride	Merle Haggard; Loretta Lynn; Jerry Reed; Conway Twitty
1970	Merle Haggard	Glen Campbell; Johnny Cash; Roy Clark; Charley Pride
1969	Johnny Cash	Glen Campbell; Roy Clark; Merle Haggard; Charley Pride
1968	Glen Campbell	Eddy Arnold; Johnny Cash; Merle Haggard; Charley Pride
1967	Eddy Arnold	Bill Anderson; Merle Haggard; Sonny James; Buck Owens

== Artists with multiple wins ==
Artists that received multiple awards
Awards	Artist
7	Garth Brooks
4	Kenny Chesney
3	Alabama
3	Alan Jackson
3	George Strait
2	Barbara Mandrell
2	Hank Williams Jr.
2	Keith Urban
2	Luke Bryan
2	Luke Combs
2	Taylor Swift
2	Vince Gill
2	Lainey Wilson

== Artists with multiple nominations ==
19 nominations

- George Strait

13 nominations

- Garth Brooks
- Keith Urban

12 nominations

- Alan Jackson

11 nominations

- Brooks & Dunn
- Kenny Chesney

10 nominations

- Reba McEntire
- Chris Stapleton

9 nominations

- Merle Haggard

8 nominations

- Brad Paisley
- Vince Gill

7 nominations

- Luke Combs

6 nominations

- Barbara Mandrell
- Carrie Underwood
- Charley Pride
- Luke Bryan
- Miranda Lambert
- Tim McGraw
- Willie Nelson

5 nominations

- Alabama
- Eric Church
- Kenny Rogers
- Loretta Lynn
- Ronnie Milsap

4 nominations

- Blake Shelton
- Jason Aldean
- Morgan Wallen
- Randy Travis
- Ricky Skaggs
- Roy Clark
- Taylor Swift
- Toby Keith
- Lainey Wilson

3 nominations

- Dixie Chicks
- Dolly Parton
- Glen Campbell
- Hank Williams Jr.
- Johnny Cash
- Oak Ridge Boys
- The Judds
- Waylon Jennings

2 nominations

- Clint Black
- Crystal Gayle
- Eddy Arnold
- Lee Greenwood
- Conway Twitty
- Rascal Flatts
- Jerry Reed
- Mel Tillis
- Ricky Van Shelton
- Cody Johnson

=== Won on First nomination ===
- Eddy Arnold (1967)
- Glen Campbell (1968)
- Charlie Rich (1974)
- John Denver (1975)
- Mel Tillis (1976)
- Hank Williams Jr. (1987)
- Garth Brooks (1991)
- Shania Twain (1999)
- Keith Urban (2005)
- Taylor Swift (2009)
- Lainey Wilson (2023)
- Ella Langley (2026)

== See also ==
- Academy of Country Music Award for Entertainer of the Year
