= Gary (Stephen Wilson Jr. song) =

Single by Stephen Wilson Jr.

from the album Impression of a Human // Children of the Cornermen
- Released: January 26, 2026
- Genre: Country
- Length: 5:14
- Label: Big Loud; Universal Music Group
- Songwriter: Stephen Wilson Jr.
- Producers: Stephen Wilson Jr.; Ben West

Music video
- "Gary" on YouTube

"Gary" is a song by American country music singer Stephen Wilson Jr. Originally released as a promotional single in November 2025, it was released to country radio on January 26, 2026, as his first single to country radio. It is the lead single to his upcoming second album Impression of a Human // Children of the Cornermen.

== Content ==
Wilson was inspired to write the song after passing a memorial billboard in 2023 for a preteen named Gary, which led to the first line of the chorus: "There ain't a lot of boys named Gary these days". He built the song around a fictional character named Gary who is "generally a good guy", with Wilson stating: "The Garys that I grew up with were guys that could just fix everything. They always had a cigarette kind of stuck to their lip while they were talking, and they’d always shoot you straight and always did you a solid."

He played the then-unfinished track for producer Ben West, who brought it up in December 2023, when Wilson was working on putting together songs for his next album following the release of Son of Dad. Wilson finally recorded the song in February 2025 at Gravitron Studios. His label, Big Loud, had initially been considering a different song for country radio until hearing "Gary" in October of that year, which led to them requesting that West cut some of the length down for a single edit.

== Music video ==
The music video for "Gary" premiered on March 15, 2026. It was directed by Tim Cofield and shot on location in Bon Aqua, Tennessee. Gary Sinise stars in the video as the titular character, portraying a blue collar day laborer going about his day, before he decides to commit a bank robbery. He flees the scene of the crime by car and drives through his community throwing the money out the window for his neighbors to collect, described as "a pseudo Robin Hood moment". Wilson appears as a security guard at the bank.

== Chart performance ==
"Gary" debuted at number 55 on the Billboard Country Airplay chart dated February 7, 2026. It entered the top 40 of the chart in its fifth week, boosted by his selection as part of Audacy, Inc.'s 'Launch' Artist program.

== Charts ==
Weekly chart performance for "Gary"
| Chart (2026) | Peak position |
|---|---|
| US Country Airplay (Billboard) | 33 |
