= Highways Festival =

European annual country music festival

- Genre: Country; Americana
- Dates: 20 May 2023; 17–18 May 2024; 16–17 May 2025; 15–17 May 2026
- Locations: Royal Albert Hall, London
- Years active: 2023-present
- Capacity: 5,272 each night
- Website: www.highwaysfestival.co.uk

Highways is a country and Americana music festival that has been held at the Royal Albert Hall in London annually since 2023. The inaugural edition of the festival took place on 20 May 2023, which the festival expanding to two nights for the following two years. In 2026, the festival took place over three nights. It is a joint production between the Royal Albert Hall and Live Nation Entertainment.

== Background ==
The festival was first announced on 2 December 2022, with tickets going on sale a week later on 9 December. As part of the announcement, the Vice President of Touring at Live Nation, Anna Sophie-Mertens, stated: "I am thrilled to bring to life this incredible festival alongside our partners at the Royal Albert Hall. It is every artist’s dream to play this legendary venue, and delivering such an unforgettable occasion for the Country and Americana community has been a longstanding dream of mine." A spokesperson for the Hall added: "We’re delighted to be building a completely new Country and Americana event with our long-standing partners at Live Nation. Our 152-year-old auditorium will provide a backdrop unlike anywhere else for some brilliant acts, and we’re particularly pleased to be able to build on the long-running history of country music at the Hall in this way – as these genres continue to grow from strength to strength in the UK."

== Highways Festival 2023 ==
The lineup for the inaugural festival was announced on 2 December 2022. Regarding his reveal as the first ever headliner, Kip Moore stated, “It’s pretty overwhelming to think about playing such an iconic venue as Royal Albert Hall. It’s been a goal of mine for as long as I can remember. Audiences in the UK are some of my all-time favourite to play and I can’t wait to be back over there to launch Highways Festival. It’s going to be really special.”

20 May
- Kip Moore
- Morgan Wade
- Jackson Dean
- Stephen Wilson Jr.

Kip Moore setlist
- 1. Damn Love
- 2. Fire and Flame
- 3. Peace & Love
- 4. Crazy One More Time
- 5. Wild Ones
- 6. That Was Us
- 7. Plead the Fifth
- 8. Beer Money
- 9. Red White Blue Jean American Dream
- 10. Kinda Bar
- 11. She's Mine
- 12. More Girls Like You
- 13. Heart on Fire
- 14. The Bull
- 15. Another Night in Knoxville
- 16. Somethin' 'Bout a Truck
- 17. Heart's Desire
- 18. Come and Get It
- 19. Last Shot
- 20. Angels (Robbie Williams cover)
- 21. Micky's Bar
- 22. Backseat
- 23. Guitar Man

== Highways Festival 2024 ==
The second edition of the festival was held on 17 and 18 May 2024. The line-up was announced on 4 December 2023.

| 16 March | 17 March |
|---|---|
| The Cadillac Three; Shane Smith and The Saints; Tanner Ursey; Bowen*Young | Brett Young; The War and Treaty; Josh Ross; William Prince |

The Cadillac Three setlist
Brett Young setlist
1. Sleep Without You
2. Left Side of Leavin'
3. Like I Loved You
4. You Didn't
5. Let Go Too Soon
6. Back to Jesus
7. Dance with You
8. Uncomfortable
9. Hallelujah (Leonard Cohen cover)
10. You Ain't Here to Kiss Me
11. Lady
12. Ticket to L.A.
13. Stick Season (Noah Kahan cover)
14. Mercy
15. Not Yet
16. Catch
17. Chapters
18. You Got Away With It
19. In Case You Didn't Know
20. Used to Missin' You
21. Here Tonight

== Highways Festival 2025 ==
The third edition of Highways too place on 16 and 17 May 2025. The line-up was announced on 27 January 2025. Eric Church headlined both nights with an exclusive pair of performances as part of his To Beat the Devil residency show, which had previously only taken place at Chief's, his Nashville bar. A statement accompanying the announcement read, "Our third edition of Highways is set to be a special occasion not to be missed with Eric Church, one of Nashville’s greats, headlining both nights. His acclaimed residency will make history at Highways as the only time we get to see this show in Europe and there isn’t a venue more fitting to experience this than the Royal Albert Hall." The 17 March show was Charles Wesley Godwin's first UK performance. The festival also included a "country for kids" event starring Ashley Campbell prior to the Friday night performances, and songwriter's round featuring Ben Earle, Hammack, Eric Paslay, and Katie Pruitt prior to the Saturday performances. Our Man in the Field and Alyssa Bonagura performed at late night afterparties following Church's headlining sets.

| 16 March | 17 March |
|---|---|
| Eric Church; Molly Tuttle; Caylee Hammack | Eric Church; Charles Wesley Godwin; Bella White |

Eric Church setlist
1. Broadway Lights
2. Mr. Misunderstood
3. 16th Avenue (Lacy J. Dalton cover)
4. How 'Bout You / Two Pink Lines / Pledge Allegiance to the Hag
5. Lightning
6. Closer Than You
7. On the Road
8. Country Music Jesus
9. Springsteen / Cold One
10. Record Year
11. A Man Who Was Gonna Die Young
12. Church Boys
13. Johnny
14. Take Me to the River (Al Green cover) / Smoke a Little Smoke
15. Hell of a View

== Highways Festival 2026 ==
The fourth edition of Highways Festival took place from 15 to 17 May 2026, expanding to three nights for the first time. The line-up was announced on 24 November 2025, headlined by Jon Pardi, Carly Pearce, and Country Music Hall of Fame member Emmylou Harris, who performed as part of her European farewell tour.

| 15 May | 16 May | 17 May |
|---|---|---|
| Jon Pardi; Randall King; Kaitlin Butts; Jack Van Cleaf | Carly Pearce; Corey Kent; Tigirlily Gold; Clover County | Emmylou Harris; Jim Lauderdale |

== See also ==
- List of country music festivals
- List of folk festivals
