= Brett Young discography =

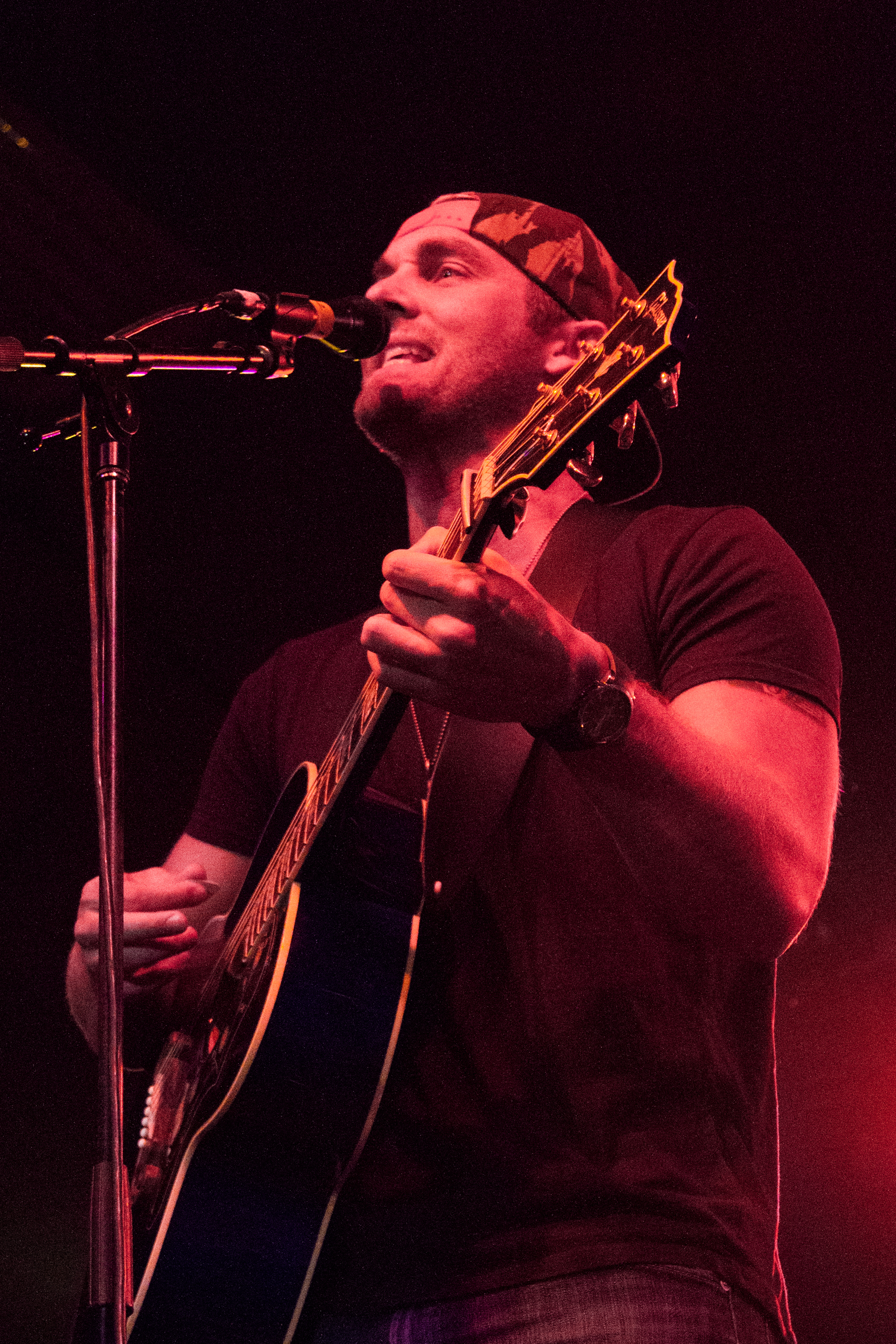
- Studio albums: 8
- EPs: 6
- Singles: 11
- Promotional singles: 4
- Music videos: 8
- Christmas albums: 1
- Country airplay No. 1 singles: 6

The discography of American country music singer and songwriter Brett Young consists of eight studio albums, one christmas album, six EPs, as well as singles and music videos. He had his first success with Brett Young released in 2017, which produced a number of hit singles, most notably "In Case You Didn't Know" and "Mercy".

== Albums ==
=== Studio albums ===
Title	Album details	Peak chart positions				Sales	Certifications
Title	Album details	US	US Country	AUS	CAN	Sales	Certifications
Brett Young	Release date: December 23, 2012; Label: Brett Young	—	—	—	—		
On Fire	Release date: March 1, 2013; Label: Rutherford Entertainment	—	—	—	—		
Broken Down	Release date: October 15, 2013; Label: Rutherford Entertainment	—	—	—	—		
Brett Young	Release date: February 10, 2017; Label: Big Machine	18	2	—	26	US: 253,400	RIAA: 2× Platinum; MC: Platinum
Ticket to L.A.	Release date: December 7, 2018; Label: Big Machine	15	1	93	38	US: 75,900	RIAA: Gold
Weekends Look a Little Different These Days	Release date: June 4, 2021; Label: BMLG	79	9	—	—		
Across the Sheets	Release date: August 4, 2023; Label: BMLG	—	39	—	—		
2.0	Release date: June 20, 2025; Label: BMLG	—	—	—	—		
"—" denotes releases that did not chart

=== Christmas albums ===
Title	Album details	Ref.
Brett Young & Friends Sing the Christmas Classics	Release date: September 14, 2021; Label: BMLG	

== Extended plays ==
Title	EP details	Peak chart positions			Sales	Ref.
Title	EP details	US	US Country	US Heat	Sales	Ref.
Brett Young EP 2007	Release date: 2007; Label: Ola Vista Music	—	—	—		
Make Believe	Release date: January 13, 2011; Label: Rutherford Entertainment	—	—	—		
Acoustic	Release date: October 12, 2011; Label: Brett Young	—	—	—		
Supposed to Be	Release date: May 18, 2012; Label: Brett Young	—	—	—		
Brett Young	Release date: February 12, 2016; Label: Republic Nashville	189	30	6	US: 19,200	
The Acoustic Sessions	Release date: August 16, 2019; Label: Republic Nashville	—	31	—	US: 800	
"—" denotes releases that did not chart

== Singles ==
=== As lead artist ===
Title	Year	Peak chart positions					Sales	Certifications	Album
Title	Year	US	US Country	US Country Airplay	CAN	CAN Country	Sales	Certifications	Album
"Sleep Without You"	2016	47	3	2	93	7	US: 377,000	RIAA: 2× Platinum; ARIA: Gold	Brett Young
"In Case You Didn't Know"	2017	19	2	1	50	1	US: 1,263,000	RIAA: Diamond; ARIA: 3× Platinum; MC: 7× Platinum; BPI: Gold; RMNZ: 2× Platinum	Brett Young
"Like I Loved You"	2017	46	3	1	91	1	US: 256,000	RIAA: 2× Platinum; ARIA: Gold	Brett Young
"Mercy"	2018	29	2	1	56	8	US: 489,000	RIAA: 4× Platinum; ARIA: Platinum	Brett Young
"Here Tonight"	2018	42	2	1	70	2	US: 89,000	RIAA: 2× Platinum; ARIA: Gold	Ticket to L.A.
"Catch"	2019	29	5	1	90	3		RIAA: Platinum; MC: Platinum	Ticket to L.A.
"Lady"	2020	52	7	1	68	9		RIAA: Gold; ARIA: Gold; MC: Gold	Weekends Look a Little Different These Days
"Not Yet"	2021	—	35	37	—	47		MC: Gold	Weekends Look a Little Different These Days
"You Didn't"	2021	63	18	10	—	26		RIAA: Gold	Weekends Look a Little Different These Days
"Dance with You"	2023	—	40	25	—	56		MC: Gold	Across the Sheets
"Drink with You"	2025	—	—	41	—	56			2.0
"—" denotes a recording that did not chart or was not released in that territory.

=== As featured artist ===
Title	Year	Peak chart positions		Album	Ref.
Title	Year	US Country	US Country Airplay	Album	Ref.
"I Do" (with Astrid S)	2020	—	—	Leave It Beautiful (Complete)	
"Never Til Now" (with Ashley Cooke)	2022	46	49	Already Drank That Beer	
"Broke Heart Break" (with Maoli)	2024	—	—	Non-album single	

=== Promotional singles ===
Title	Year	Album	Ref.
"Goodnight Into Good Morning"	2024	2.0	
"Say Less"	2024	2.0	
"Kiss to Forget"	2024	2.0	
"Tastes Like You"	2025	2.0	

== Other charted and certified songs ==
Title	Year	Peak chart positions		Certifications	Album
Title	Year	US Christ	US Country	Certifications	Album
"You Ain't Here to Kiss Me"		—	—	MC: Gold	Brett Young
"Don't Wanna Write This Song"	2018	—	32		Ticket to L.A.
"Chapters" (featuring Gavin DeGraw)	2018	—	—	RIAA: Gold	Ticket to L.A.
"Be the Moon" (with Chris Tomlin and Cassadee Pope)	2020	30	—		Chris Tomlin & Friends

== Music videos ==
Title	Year	Director	Ref,
"Sleep Without You"	2016	Shane Drake	
"In Case You Didn't Know"	2017	Jennifer Rothlein	
"Like I Loved You"	2017	Phillip Lopez	
"O Holy Night"	2017	—N/a	
"Mercy"	2018	Seth Kupersmith	
"Here Tonight"	2018	Greg Crutcher	
"Catch"	2019	Seth Kupersmith	
"Not Yet"	2021	Seth Kupersmith	
