= Brett Young =

Brett Young may refer to:

- Brett Young (Canadian football) (1967–2015), American player of Canadian football
- Brett Young (singer) (born 1981), American country singer-songwriter
  - Brett Young (album), 2017
  - Brett Young (EP), 2016
- Ace Young (Brett Asa Young, born 1980), American singer
