= Dance with You =

Dance with You may refer to:

- "Dance with You (Nachna Tere Naal)", by the Rishi Rich Project, 2003
- "Naal Nachna" (lit. 'Dance with You'), by Shashwat Sachdev, Afsana Khan and Reble from the 2025 Indian film Dhurandhar
- "Dance (With U)", a song by Lemar, 2003
- "Dance with You", a song by Ben Platt from Reverie, 2021
- "Dance with You", a song by Brett Young from Across the Sheets, 2023
- "Dance with You", a song by Laura Marano, 2021
- "Dance with You", a song by Marcus & Martinus from Moments, 2017
- "Dance with You", a song by New Kids on the Block from Still Kids, 2024
- "Dance with You", a song by Skusta Clee, 2020
- "Dance with You", a song by Solange Knowles from Solo Star, 2002
- "Dance with You", a song by the Toggery Five, 1964
- "Dance with You", a song from the musical The Prom, 2016
- "Dance with U", a song by RuPaul from Born Naked, 2014

== See also ==
- Dance with You Tonight (disambiguation)
- "Dance Without You", a song by Skylar Grey, 2011
