= List of number-one country singles of 2017 (Canada) =

Canada Country was a chart published weekly by Billboard magazine.

This 50-position chart lists the most popular country music songs, calculated weekly by airplay on 42 country music stations across the country as monitored by Nielsen BDS. Songs are ranked by total plays. As with most other Billboard charts, the Canada Country chart features a rule for when a song enters recurrent rotation. A song is declared recurrent if it has been on the chart longer than 30 weeks and is lower than number 20 in rank.

These are the Canadian number-one country singles of 2017, per the BDS Canada Country Airplay chart.

Note that Billboard publishes charts with an issue date approximately 7–10 days in advance.

Key
†	Indicates best charting country single of 2017.

Issue date	Country Song	Artist	Ref.
January 7	"Wanna Be That Song"	Brett Eldredge	
January 14	"Wanna Be That Song"	Brett Eldredge	
January 21	"Wanna Be That Song"	Brett Eldredge	
January 28	"A Guy with a Girl"	Blake Shelton	
February 4	"A Guy with a Girl"	Blake Shelton	
February 11	"Star of the Show"	Thomas Rhett	
February 18	"Star of the Show"	Thomas Rhett	
February 25	"Dirt on My Boots"	Jon Pardi	
March 4	"Dirt on My Boots"	Jon Pardi	
March 11	"Better Man"	Little Big Town	
March 18	"Better Man"	Little Big Town	
March 25	"Fast"	Luke Bryan	
April 1	"Fast"	Luke Bryan	
April 8	"Any Ol' Barstool"	Jason Aldean	
April 15	"Any Ol' Barstool"	Jason Aldean	
April 22	"Side Effects"	Dallas Smith	
April 29	"Body Like a Back Road" †	Sam Hunt	
May 6	"Body Like a Back Road" †	Sam Hunt	
May 13	"Body Like a Back Road" †	Sam Hunt	
May 20	"Body Like a Back Road" †	Sam Hunt	
May 27	"I Be U Be"	High Valley	
June 3	"I Be U Be"	High Valley	
June 10	"In Case You Didn't Know"	Brett Young	
June 17	"In Case You Didn't Know"	Brett Young	
June 24	"In Case You Didn't Know"	Brett Young	
July 1	"Chills"	James Barker Band	
July 8	"Craving You"	Thomas Rhett featuring Maren Morris	
July 15	"Craving You"	Thomas Rhett featuring Maren Morris	
July 22	"Craving You"	Thomas Rhett featuring Maren Morris	
July 29	"Craving You"	Thomas Rhett featuring Maren Morris	
August 5	"Drinkin' Problem"	Midland	
August 12	"Drinkin' Problem"	Midland	
August 19	"For Her"	Chris Lane	
August 26	"Sky Stays This Blue"	Dallas Smith	
September 2	"Heartache on the Dance Floor"	Jon Pardi	
September 9	"Heartache on the Dance Floor"	Jon Pardi	
September 16	"Heartache on the Dance Floor"	Jon Pardi	
September 23	"Small Town Boy"	Dustin Lynch	
September 30	"Small Town Boy"	Dustin Lynch	
October 7	"Small Town Boy"	Dustin Lynch	
October 14	"When It Rains It Pours"	Luke Combs	
October 21	"When It Rains It Pours"	Luke Combs	
October 28	"When It Rains It Pours"	Luke Combs	
November 4	"Unforgettable"	Thomas Rhett	
November 11	"Unforgettable"	Thomas Rhett	
November 18	"Unforgettable"	Thomas Rhett	
November 25	"Unforgettable"	Thomas Rhett	
December 2	"Every Little Thing"	Carly Pearce	
December 9	"I'll Name the Dogs"	Blake Shelton	
December 16	"I'll Name the Dogs"	Blake Shelton	
December 23	"I'll Name the Dogs"	Blake Shelton	
December 30	"Like I Loved You"	Brett Young	

== See also ==
- 2017 in country music
- List of number-one country singles of 2017 (U.S.)
