= List of Billboard number-one country songs of 2017 =

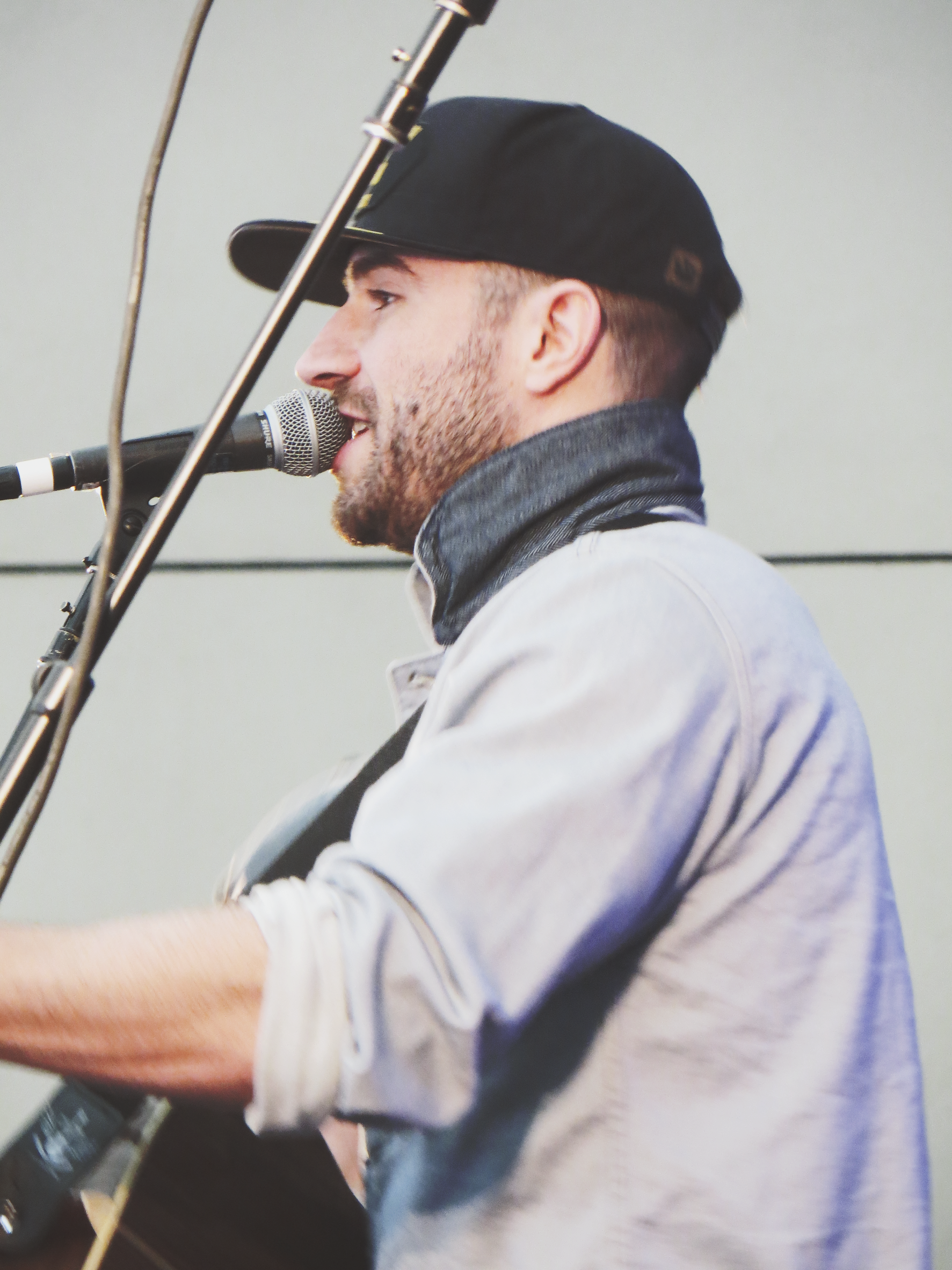
Sam Hunt set a new record for the longest-running number-one country song when "Body Like a Back Road" spent 34 weeks atop the Hot Country Songs listing.

Hot Country Songs and Country Airplay are charts that rank the top-performing country music songs in the United States, published by Billboard magazine. Hot Country Songs ranks songs based on digital downloads, streaming, and airplay not only from country stations but from stations of all formats, a methodology introduced in 2012. Country Airplay, which was published for the first time in 2012, is based solely on country radio airplay, a methodology which had previously been used for several decades for Hot Country Songs. In 2017, seven different songs topped the Hot Country Songs chart and 34 different songs topped Country Airplay in 52 issues of the magazine.

In the issue of Billboard dated February 25, singer Sam Hunt reached number one with the song "Body Like a Back Road", which would remain in the top spot through the issue dated October 14. In August, the song broke the record for the most weeks spent at number one on the Hot Country Songs listing, surpassing the 24 weeks spent in the top spot by Florida Georgia Line's "Cruise" in 2012 and 2013. Hunt's song was finally knocked from the top of the chart in the issue dated October 21 by "What Ifs" by Kane Brown featuring Lauren Alaina. Two months later, "Meant to Be" by Bebe Rexha and Florida Georgia Line entered the Hot Country chart at number one, only the fourth time a song had debuted in the top position of the Hot Country Songs chart. The song would go on to break Hunt's record the following summer when it spent a 35th consecutive week at number one. On the Country Airplay chart, Dustin Lynch had the longest run at number one of 2017, spending four consecutive weeks at the top with "Small Town Boy". Lynch tied with Blake Shelton for the highest total number of weeks at number one on that chart, both artists spending five weeks in the top spot. Shelton took three different songs to number one, a feat also achieved by Thomas Rhett. No act achieved more than one chart-topper on the Hot Country Songs listing.

Ten acts gained their first country number ones in 2017. Lauren Alaina topped the airplay chart for the first time in April with "Road Less Traveled" and was subsequently featured on "What Ifs", which was the first chart-topper for Kane Brown, reaching the top spot of both charts. Luke Combs topped the airplay chart in May with "Hurricane", his debut single, and was immediately followed into the top spot by another debut chart-topper, Brett Young's "In Case You Didn't Know". In July, Backstreet Boys, an internationally successful pop act since the 1990s, gained their first and only country number one when they collaborated with Florida Georgia Line on the song "God, Your Mama, and Me". Two weeks later, Maren Morris made her debut at number one thanks to her featured performance on Thomas Rhett's song "Craving You", which was replaced in the top spot by "My Girl", the first number one for Dylan Scott. In November, Carly Pearce took her debut single "Every Little Thing" to number one, and the following week, the band Lanco gained its first chart-topper with "Greatest Love Story". The final artist to reach number one for the first time in 2017 was Bebe Rexha. More closely associated with the pop music and R&B genres, Rexha's collaboration with Florida Georgia Line was her first and only country hit.

== Chart history ==
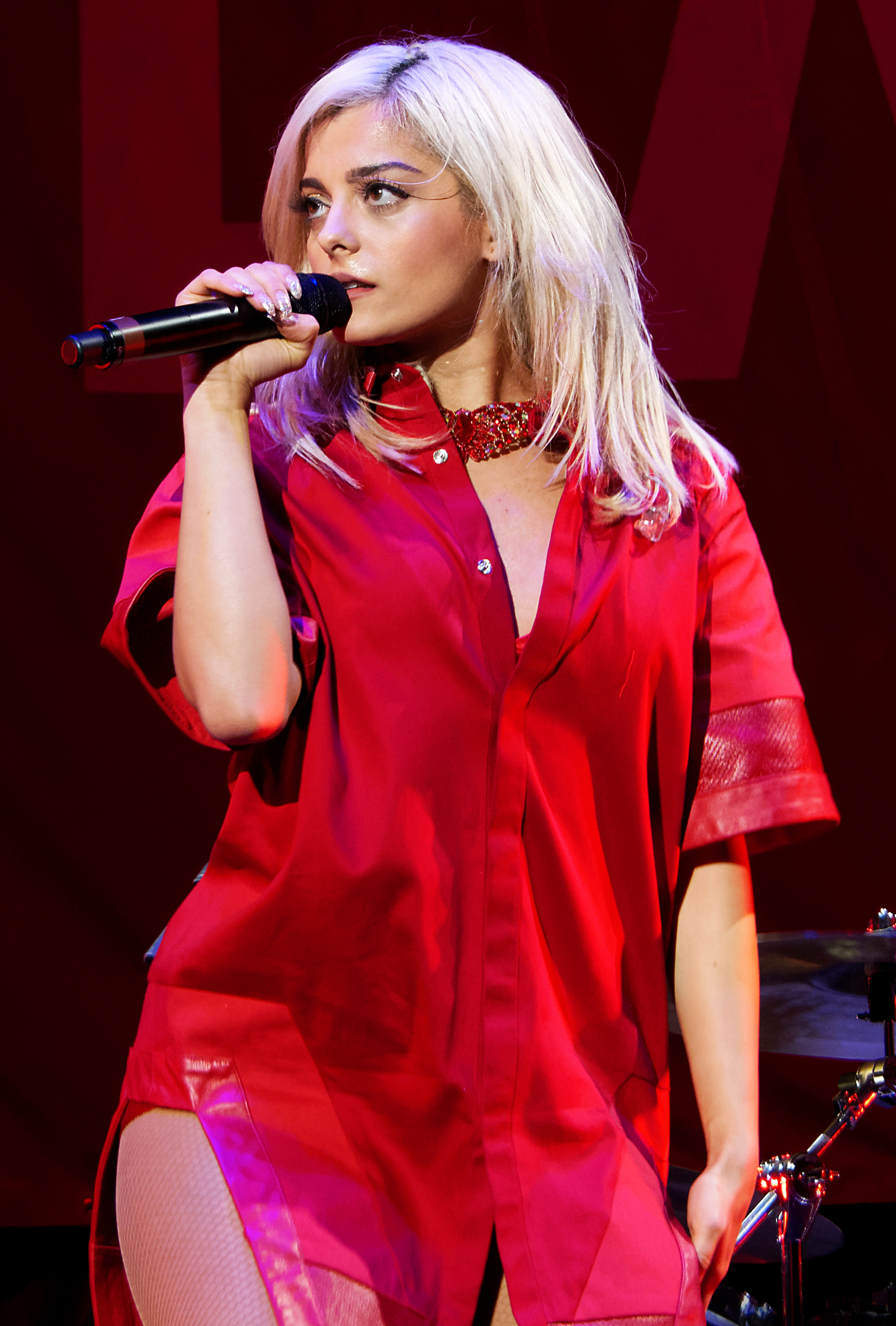
Bebe Rexha went straight into number one on Hot Country Songs in December with "Meant to Be", a collaboration with Florida Georgia Line.

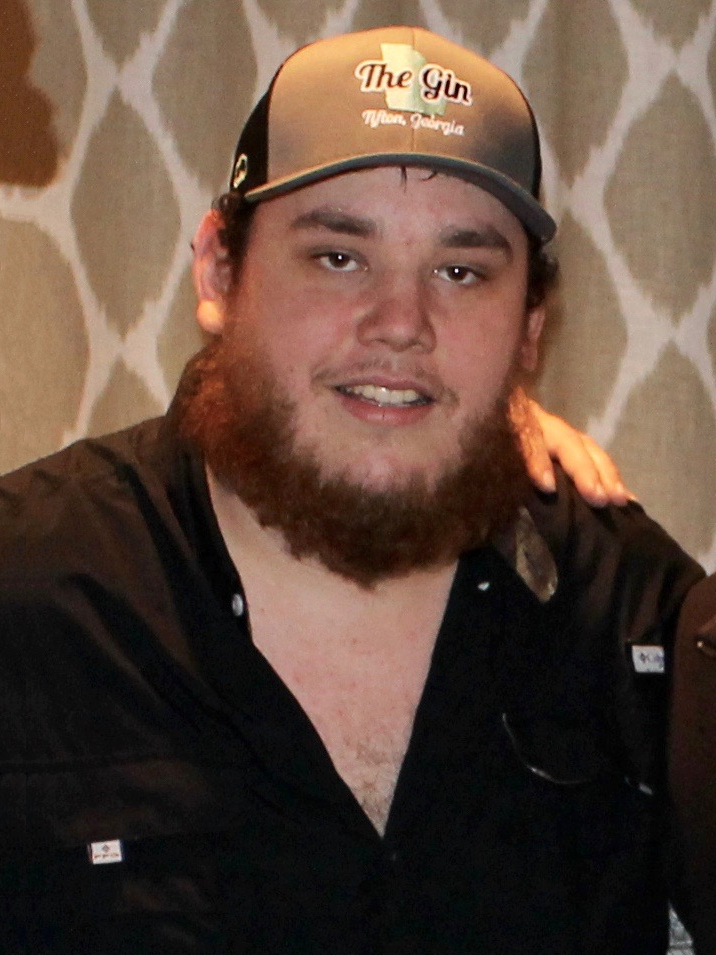
"When It Rains It Pours" by Luke Combs topped both charts.

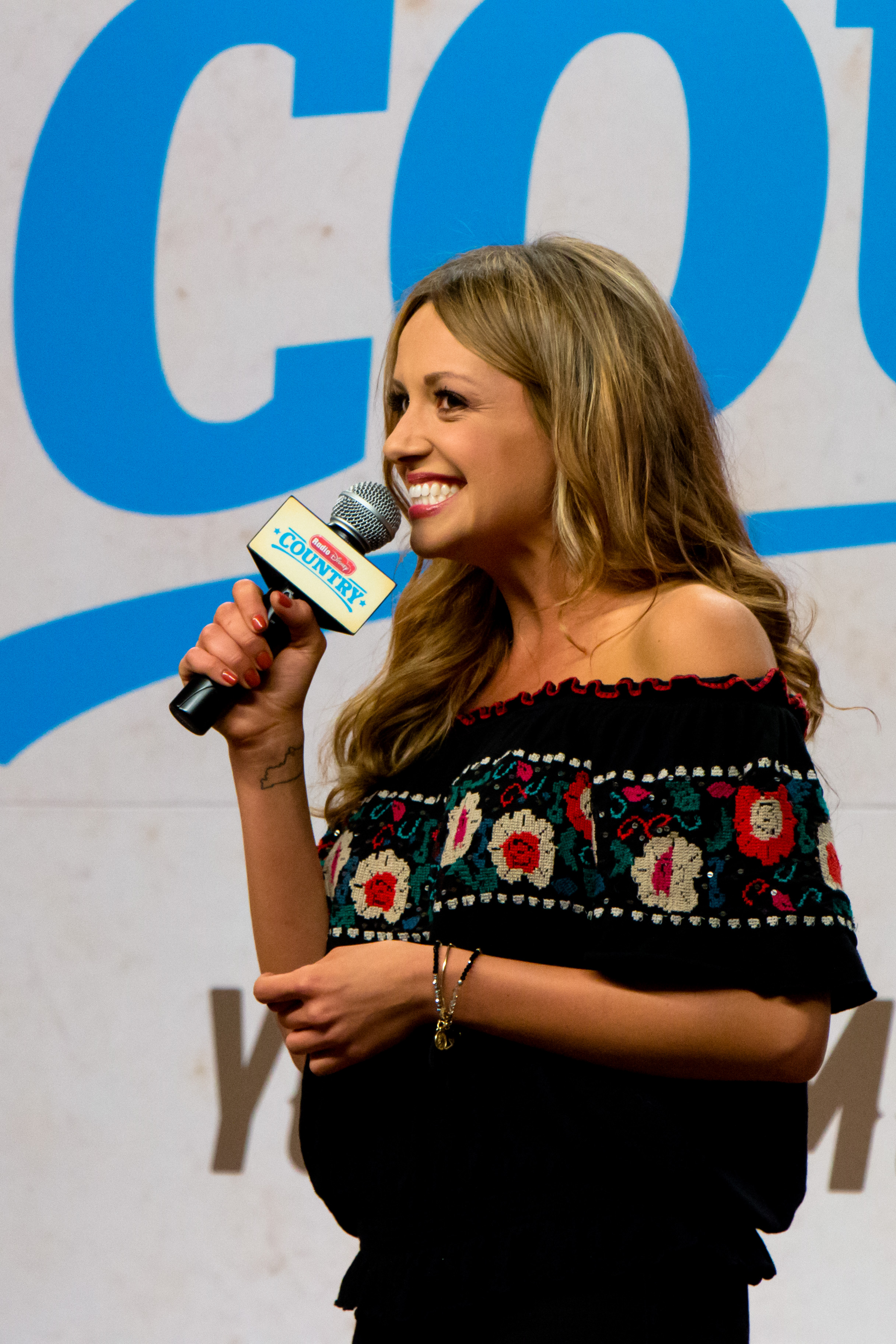
Carly Pearce gained her first chart-topper with "Every Little Thing".

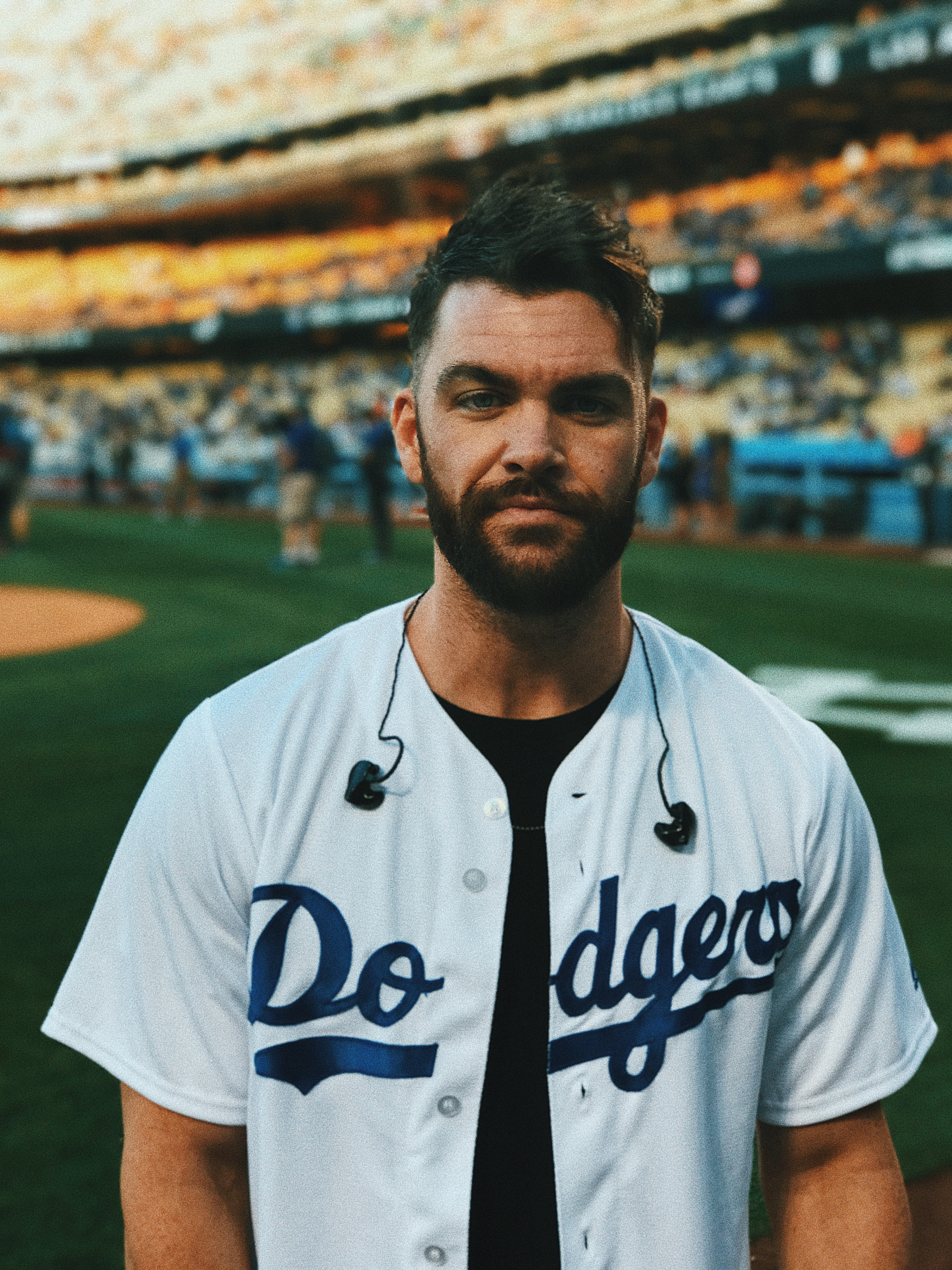
"My Girl" gave Dylan Scott his first number one.

Chart history
Issue date	Hot Country Songs			Country Airplay		
Issue date	Title	Artist(s)	Ref.	Title	Artist(s)	Ref.
January 7	"Blue Ain't Your Color"	Keith Urban		"Wanna Be That Song"	Brett Eldredge	
January 14	"Blue Ain't Your Color"	Keith Urban		"Blue Ain't Your Color"	Keith Urban	
January 21	"Blue Ain't Your Color"	Keith Urban		"Blue Ain't Your Color"	Keith Urban	
January 28	"Blue Ain't Your Color"	Keith Urban		"A Guy with a Girl"	Blake Shelton	
February 4	"Blue Ain't Your Color"	Keith Urban		"A Guy with a Girl"	Blake Shelton	
February 11	"Better Man"	Little Big Town		"A Guy with a Girl"	Blake Shelton	
February 18	"Better Man"	Little Big Town		"Star of the Show"	Thomas Rhett	
February 25	"Body Like a Back Road"	Sam Hunt		"Seein' Red"	Dustin Lynch	
March 4	"Body Like a Back Road"	Sam Hunt		"Better Man"	Little Big Town	
March 11	"Body Like a Back Road"	Sam Hunt		"Better Man"	Little Big Town	
March 18	"Body Like a Back Road"	Sam Hunt		"Sober Saturday Night"	Chris Young featuring Vince Gill	
March 25	"Body Like a Back Road"	Sam Hunt		"Dirt on My Boots"	Jon Pardi	
April 1	"Body Like a Back Road"	Sam Hunt		"Dirt on My Boots"	Jon Pardi	
April 8	"Body Like a Back Road"	Sam Hunt		"Dirt on My Boots"	Jon Pardi	
April 15	"Body Like a Back Road"	Sam Hunt		"Fast"	Luke Bryan	
April 22	"Body Like a Back Road"	Sam Hunt		"Road Less Traveled"	Lauren Alaina	
April 29	"Body Like a Back Road"	Sam Hunt		"Any Ol' Barstool"	Jason Aldean	
May 6	"Body Like a Back Road"	Sam Hunt		"Body Like a Back Road"	Sam Hunt	
May 13	"Body Like a Back Road"	Sam Hunt		"Body Like a Back Road"	Sam Hunt	
May 20	"Body Like a Back Road"	Sam Hunt		"Body Like a Back Road"	Sam Hunt	
May 27	"Body Like a Back Road"	Sam Hunt		"Hurricane"	Luke Combs	
June 3	"Body Like a Back Road"	Sam Hunt		"Hurricane"	Luke Combs	
June 10	"Body Like a Back Road"	Sam Hunt		"In Case You Didn't Know"	Brett Young	
June 17	"Body Like a Back Road"	Sam Hunt		"In Case You Didn't Know"	Brett Young	
June 24	"Body Like a Back Road"	Sam Hunt		"If I Told You"	Darius Rucker	
July 1	"Body Like a Back Road"	Sam Hunt		"How Not To"	Dan + Shay	
July 8	"Body Like a Back Road"	Sam Hunt		"God, Your Mama, and Me"	Florida Georgia Line featuring Backstreet Boys	
July 15	"Body Like a Back Road"	Sam Hunt		"Every Time I Hear That Song"	Blake Shelton	
July 22	"Body Like a Back Road"	Sam Hunt		"Craving You"	Thomas Rhett featuring Maren Morris	
July 29	"Body Like a Back Road"	Sam Hunt		"My Girl"	Dylan Scott	
August 5	"Body Like a Back Road"	Sam Hunt		"Yours If You Want It"	Rascal Flatts	
August 12	"Body Like a Back Road"	Sam Hunt		"Do I Make You Wanna"	Billy Currington	
August 19	"Body Like a Back Road"	Sam Hunt		"Do I Make You Wanna"	Billy Currington	
August 26	"Body Like a Back Road"	Sam Hunt		"Do I Make You Wanna"	Billy Currington	
September 2	"Body Like a Back Road"	Sam Hunt		"Somebody Else Will"	Justin Moore	
September 9	"Body Like a Back Road"	Sam Hunt		"No Such Thing as a Broken Heart"	Old Dominion	
September 16	"Body Like a Back Road"	Sam Hunt		"Small Town Boy"	Dustin Lynch	
September 23	"Body Like a Back Road"	Sam Hunt		"Small Town Boy"	Dustin Lynch	
September 30	"Body Like a Back Road"	Sam Hunt		"Small Town Boy"	Dustin Lynch	
October 7	"Body Like a Back Road"	Sam Hunt		"Small Town Boy"	Dustin Lynch	
October 14	"Body Like a Back Road"	Sam Hunt		"All the Pretty Girls"	Kenny Chesney	
October 21	"What Ifs"	Kane Brown featuring Lauren Alaina		"All the Pretty Girls"	Kenny Chesney	
October 28	"What Ifs"	Kane Brown featuring Lauren Alaina		"What Ifs"	Kane Brown featuring Lauren Alaina	
November 4	"What Ifs"	Kane Brown featuring Lauren Alaina		"When It Rains It Pours"	Luke Combs	
November 11	"What Ifs"	Kane Brown featuring Lauren Alaina		"When It Rains It Pours"	Luke Combs	
November 18	"What Ifs"	Kane Brown featuring Lauren Alaina		"Unforgettable"	Thomas Rhett	
November 25	"When It Rains It Pours"	Luke Combs		"Every Little Thing"	Carly Pearce	
December 2	"When It Rains It Pours"	Luke Combs		"Greatest Love Story"	Lanco	
December 9	"Greatest Love Story"	Lanco		"Greatest Love Story"	Lanco	
December 16	"Meant to Be"	Bebe Rexha and Florida Georgia Line		"Ask Me How I Know"	Garth Brooks	
December 23	"Meant to Be"	Bebe Rexha and Florida Georgia Line		"Light It Up"	Luke Bryan	
December 30	"Meant to Be"	Bebe Rexha and Florida Georgia Line		"I'll Name the Dogs"	Blake Shelton	

== See also ==
- 2017 in country music
- List of artists who reached number one on the U.S. country chart
- List of Top Country Albums number ones of 2017
- List of number-one country singles of 2017 (Canada)
