= Brett Young (EP) =

EP by Brett Young
- Released: February 12, 2016
- Genre: Country
- Length: 21:06
- Producer: Dann Huff

Brett Young chronology
Brett Young (2016)	Brett Young (LP) (2017)

Brett Young is the first EP from American country music singer Brett Young. Released on 12 February 2016, the album was produced by Dann Huff. The EP features the single, "Sleep Without You".

Young's team describes the artist's sound as "Caliville", "an intersection of his Southern California upbringing and his passion for Nashville".

== Background ==
Although Young did not plan to release an EP prior to his full-length album, after "Sleep Without You" was published, Young knew that he must distribute his music to fans as soon as possible.

== Critical reception ==
Timothy Monger of AllMusic says "the smoky-voiced singer offers up six warm, romantic cuts that showcase his earthy charm."

Taste of Country states that Young "mixes soul, R&B and country in a way that fits neatly between any two songs you hear on the radio now", comparing the artist to Lee Brice and Jack Johnson.

Stage Right Secrets states that each song is "strategically [placed]" and that "The song order mainly focuses on the emotional rollercoaster you go through when you are in a relationship".

== Track listing ==
No.	Title	Length
1.	"Sleep Without You"	3:08
2.	"You Ain't Here to Kiss Me"	3:38
3.	"Left Side of Leavin'"	3:34
4.	"In Case You Didn't Know"	3:45
5.	"Like I Loved You"	3:27
6.	"Beautiful Believer"	3:34
Total length:		21:06

== Charts ==
Chart (2016)	Peak position
US Billboard 200	189
US Top Country Albums (Billboard)	30
US Top Heatseekers (Billboard)	6

- Sales – United States: 19,200
