= In Case You Didn't Know =

In Case You Didn't Know may refer to:

- In Case You Didn't Know (album), 2011 album by Olly Murs, or its title track
- "In Case You Didn't Know" (song), 2017 song by Brett Young
