= List of Top Country Albums number ones of 2017 =

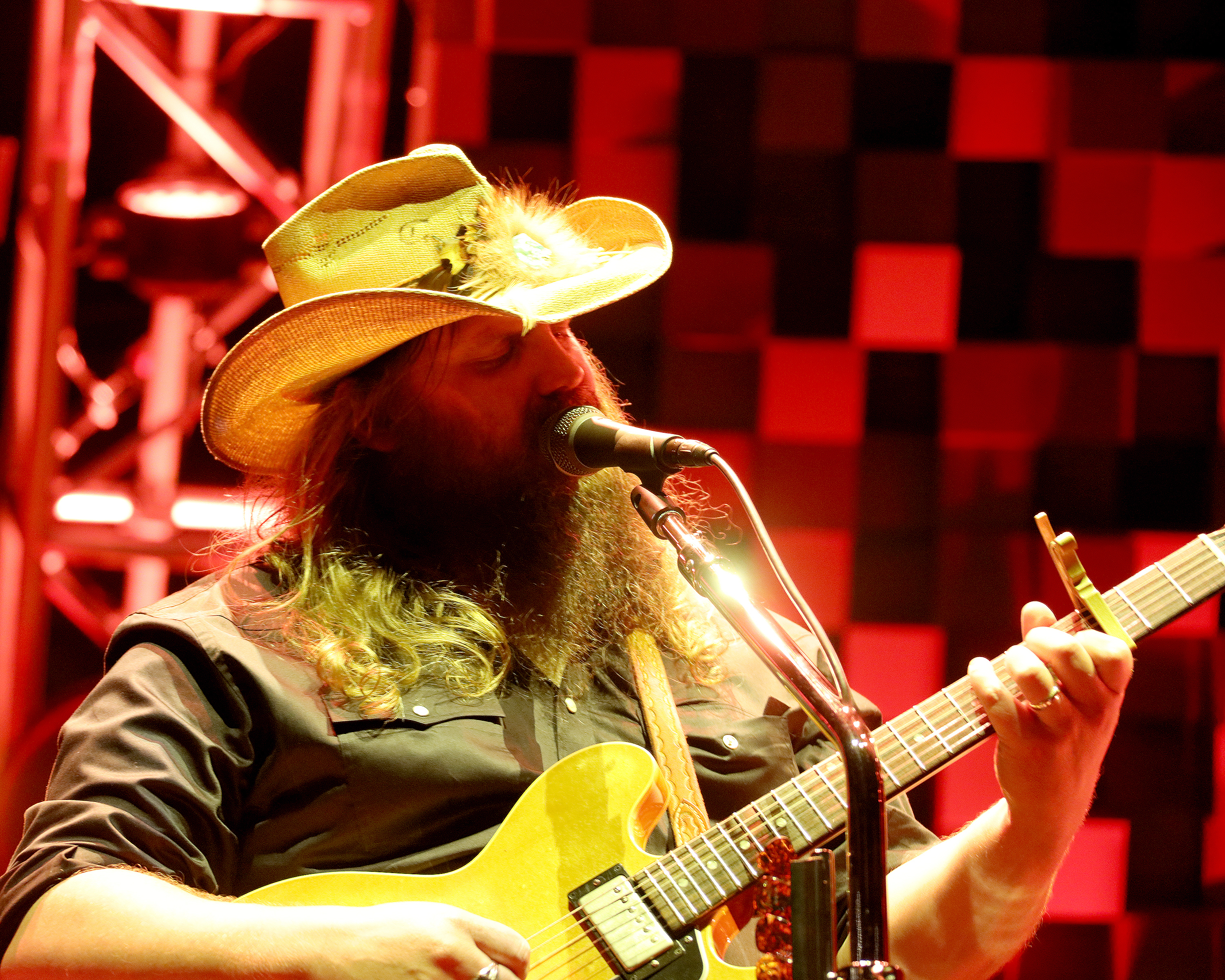
Chris Stapleton had three number ones in 2017.

Top Country Albums is a chart that ranks the top-performing country music albums in the United States, published by Billboard. In 2017, 30 different albums topped the chart; placings were based on electronic point of sale data from retail outlets through the issue dated February 4; after that Billboard introduced a new methodology based on multi-metric consumption, blending traditional album sales, track equivalent albums, and streaming equivalent albums.

In the issue of Billboard dated January 7, Garth Brooks was at number one with the box set The Ultimate Collection, its second week in the top spot. Two weeks later, it was displaced by Chris Stapleton's album Traveller, which returned to number one having already spent 24 weeks atop the chart since its release in 2015; the album added five weeks to its total in 2017. In May, Stapleton returned to number one with his next album, From A Room: Volume 1, and in December he achieved his third chart-topper of the year with From A Room: Volume 2. Stapleton's total of 14 weeks in the top spot was the highest of the year, more than three times the length of time that any other act spent at number one, and From A Room: Volume 1 had the year's longest unbroken run at number one, spending five consecutive weeks atop the listing. Garth Brooks also achieved more than one chart-topper during the year, as he returned to number one in December with a second compilation album, The Anthology Part I: The First Five Years.

In June, Luke Combs reached number one with his debut album This One's for You, which had spent four non-consecutive weeks in the top spot by the end of the year. The album would go back to the peak position the following summer after the release of a deluxe edition with additional tracks, and occupy the top spot for much of the next year and a half. It would eventually achieve a total of 50 weeks atop the listing, tying the record set by Shania Twain's album Come On Over for the highest total number of weeks at number one on the Top Country Albums chart. Twain herself topped the chart in October with Now, her first studio album for 15 years; the singer had withdrawn from the music industry in the intervening years due to health issues. RaeLynn matched Combs's feat by topping the chart with her debut album WildHorse, and Old Dominion, Thomas Rhett. and Jessie James Decker also reached number one for the first time in 2017. Rhett's album Life Changes was one of two albums to top both the Top Country Albums chart and the all-genre Billboard 200 listing in 2017, the other being Kenny Chesney's Live in No Shoes Nation.

== Chart history ==
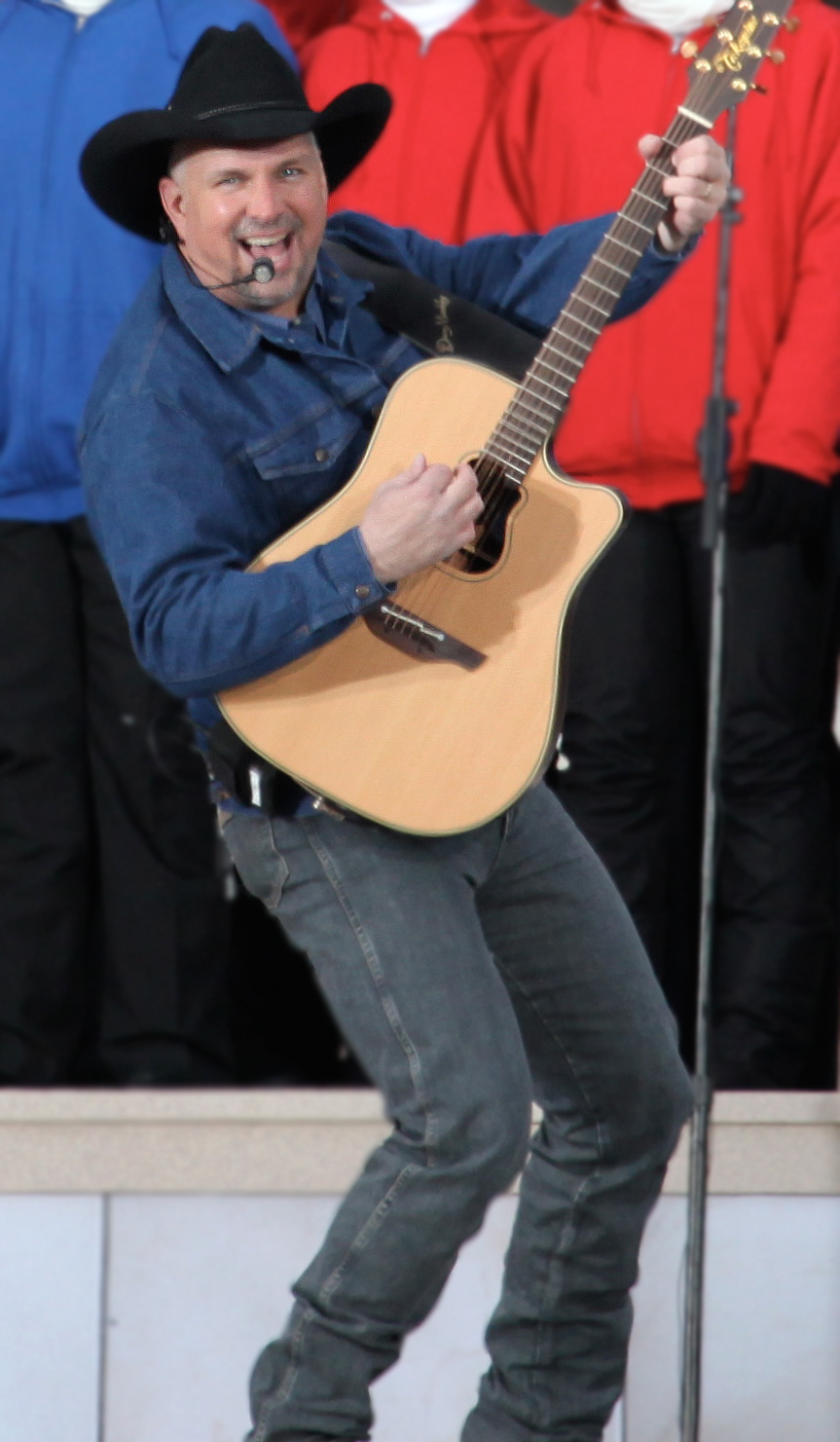
Two different compilation albums by Garth Brooks topped the chart in 2017.

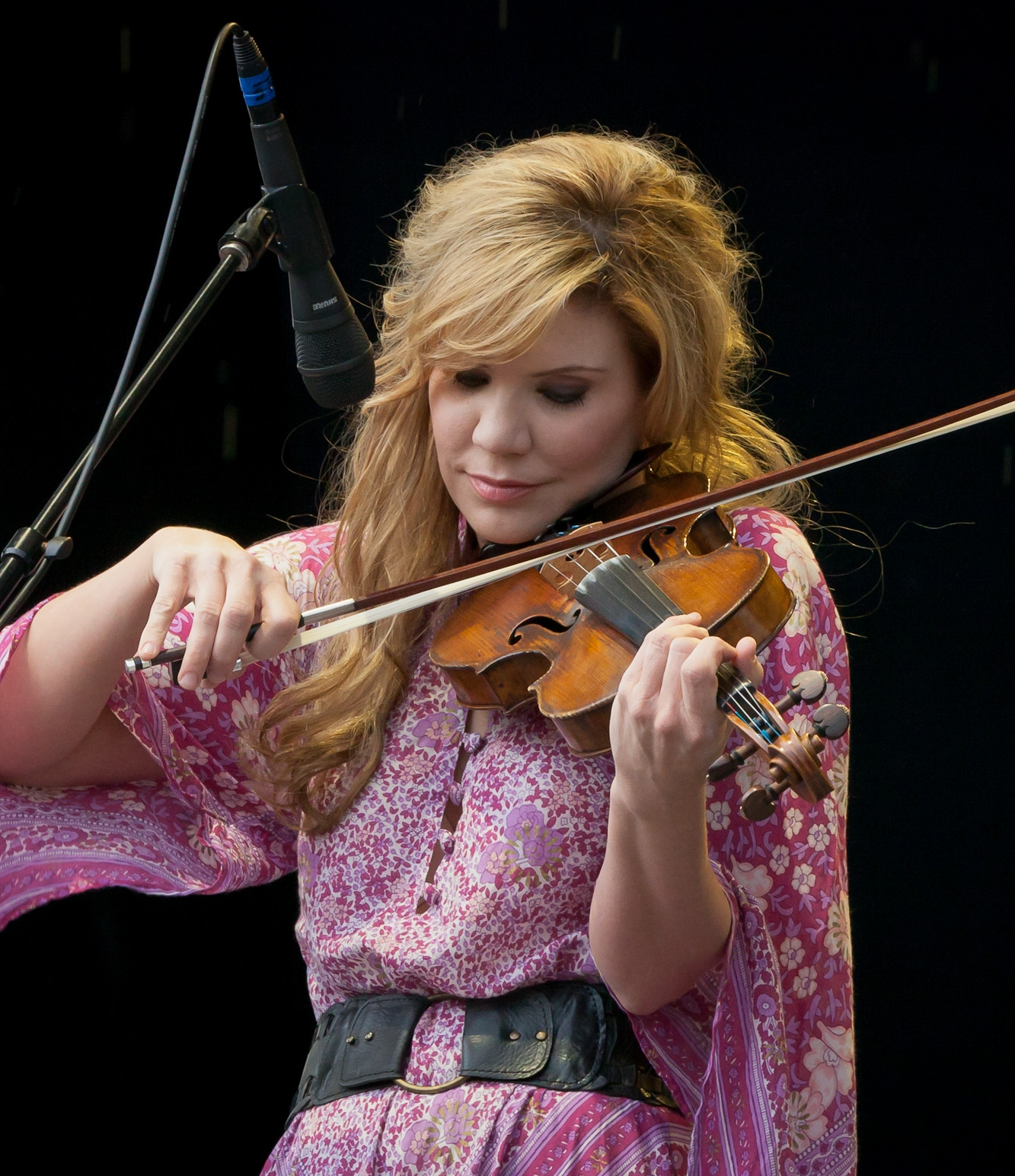
Alison Krauss had her first number one since 2011 with Windy City.

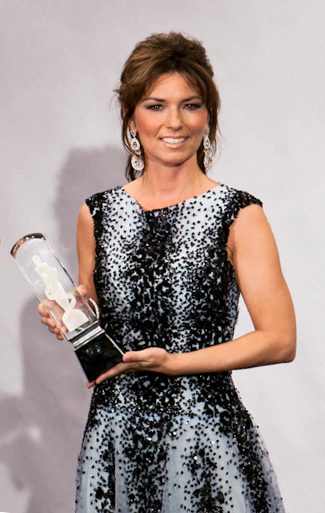
Shania Twain reached number one with Now, her comeback album after a lengthy hiatus from music.

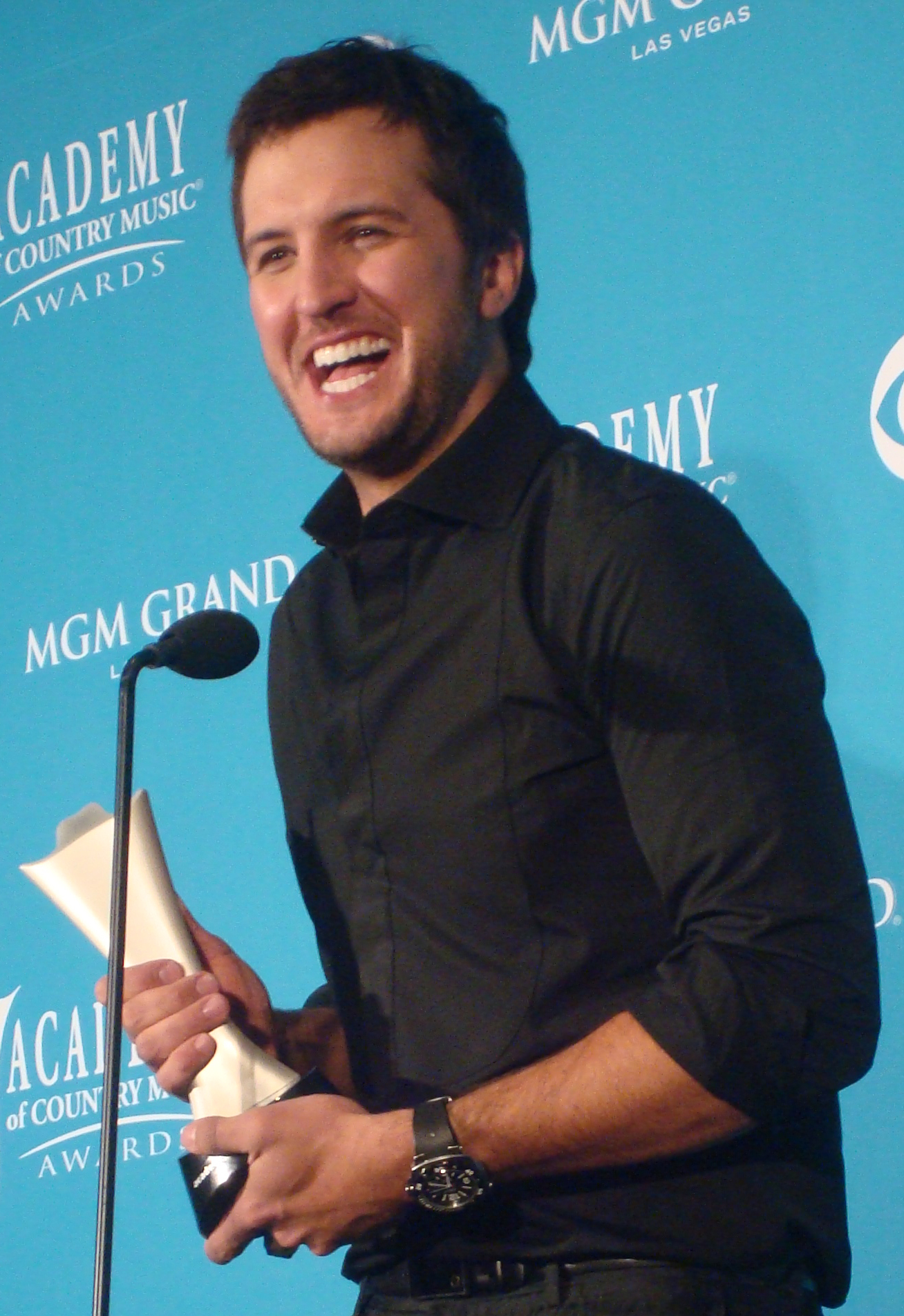
Luke Bryan ended the year at number one.

Issue date	Title	Artist(s)	Ref.
January 7	The Ultimate Collection	Garth Brooks	
January 14	The Ultimate Collection	Garth Brooks	
January 21	Traveller	Chris Stapleton	
January 28	Traveller	Chris Stapleton	
February 4	Traveller	Chris Stapleton	
February 11	Traveller	Chris Stapleton	
February 18	The Devil Don't Sleep	Brantley Gilbert	
February 25	Sing It Now: Songs of Faith & Hope	Reba McEntire	
March 4	Sing It Now: Songs of Faith & Hope	Reba McEntire	
March 11	Windy City	Alison Krauss	
March 18	The Breaker	Little Big Town	
March 25	The Breaker	Little Big Town	
April 1	Deep South	Josh Turner	
April 8	Ripcord	Keith Urban	
April 15	WildHorse	RaeLynn	
April 22	The Weight of These Wings	Miranda Lambert	
April 29	Ripcord	Keith Urban	
May 6	Ripcord	Keith Urban	
May 13	Love and War	Brad Paisley	
May 20	God's Problem Child	Willie Nelson	
May 27	From A Room: Volume 1	Chris Stapleton	
June 3	Welcome Home	Zac Brown Band	
June 10	From A Room: Volume 1	Chris Stapleton	
June 17	From A Room: Volume 1	Chris Stapleton	
June 24	This One's for You	Luke Combs	
July 1	Heart Break	Lady Antebellum	
July 8	The Nashville Sound	Jason Isbell and the 400 Unit	
July 15	From A Room: Volume 1	Chris Stapleton	
July 22	From A Room: Volume 1	Chris Stapleton	
July 29	From A Room: Volume 1	Chris Stapleton	
August 5	From A Room: Volume 1	Chris Stapleton	
August 12	From A Room: Volume 1	Chris Stapleton	
August 19	Traveller	Chris Stapleton	
August 26	Brett Eldredge	Brett Eldredge	
September 2	This One's for You	Luke Combs	
September 9	This One's for You	Luke Combs	
September 16	Happy Endings	Old Dominion	
September 23	This One's for You	Luke Combs	
September 30	Life Changes	Thomas Rhett	
October 7	Life Changes	Thomas Rhett	
October 14	Life Changes	Thomas Rhett	
October 21	Now	Shania Twain	
October 28	Kane Brown	Kane Brown	
November 4	Southern Girl City Lights	Jessie James Decker	
November 11	Losing Sleep	Chris Young	
November 18	Live in No Shoes Nation	Kenny Chesney	
November 25	Texoma Shore	Blake Shelton	
December 2	Live in No Shoes Nation	Kenny Chesney	
December 9	The Rest of Our Life	Tim McGraw and Faith Hill	
December 16	The Anthology Part I: The First Five Years	Garth Brooks	
December 23	From A Room: Volume 2	Chris Stapleton	
December 30	What Makes You Country	Luke Bryan	

== See also ==
- 2017 in music
- List of number-one country singles of 2017 (U.S.)
