= Guys Like Me =

Single by Eric Church

from the album Sinners Like Me
- Released: January 22, 2007
- Recorded: 2005–06
- Genre: Country rock
- Length: 3:11
- Label: Capitol Nashville
- Songwriters: Deric Ruttan; Eric Church
- Producer: Jay Joyce

Eric Church singles chronology
"Two Pink Lines" (2006)	"Guys Like Me" (2007)	"Sinners Like Me" (2007)

"Guys Like Me" is a song co-written and recorded by American country music artist Eric Church. It was released in January 2007 as the third single from his 2006 debut album Sinners Like Me. The song peaked at number 17 on the US Billboard Hot Country Songs chart and at number 99 on the Billboard Hot 100. Church wrote this song with Deric Ruttan.

== Content ==
The narrator describes the ways in which his lifestyle appears incompatible with that of his partner. He hypothesizes that even though she has lots of other men interested in her, it is an act of God's will that motivates her to choose someone like himself.

== Music video ==
The music video premiered in 2007 and was directed by Scott Speer.

== Chart performance ==
"Guys Like Me" debuted at number 53 on the U.S. Billboard Hot Country Songs for the week of February 3, 2007.

Chart (2007)	Peak position
Canada Country (Billboard)	39
US Hot Country Songs (Billboard)	17
US Billboard Hot 100	99

== Certifications ==
Certifications for Guys Like Me
Region	Certification	Certified units/sales
United States (RIAA)	Platinum	1,000,000^{‡}
^{‡} Sales+streaming figures based on certification alone.
