= 2.0 (Brett Young album) =

Studio album by Brett Young
- Released: June 20, 2025
- Genre: Country
- Length: 33:30
- Label: Big Machine; Nashville Harbor
- Producer: Jimmy Robbins; Dann Huff

Brett Young chronology
Across the Sheets (2023)	2.0 (2025)

Singles from 2.0
- 1. "Drink with You" Released: April 11, 2025

2.0 is the fifth studio album by American country music singer and songwriter Brett Young. It was released on June 20, 2025, through Nashville Harbor Records & Entertainment and Big Machine Records. The album marks Young's fifth release on a major label and his ninth overall. 2.0 is produced by Jimmy Robbins and Dann Huff, with Jimmy Harnen serving as executive producer.

It was promoted with the release of multiple promotional singles, and "Drink with You" was released on April 11, 2025, as the album's lead single to country radio. The record includes collaborations by Lady A, George Birge, and Hannah McFarland, with the latter featuring in a re-recording of Young's 2017 hit single "In Case You Didn't Know".

== Background and release ==
The album's announcement was made on April 9, 2025, along with the tracklist, artwork and credits. The album pre-order was made available on April 11, 2025, with the release of the single "Drink with You".

"It's always my goal to be real and transparent and connect with my audience, whether that means writing a song about what happened yesterday or revisiting past experiences [...] It should always be about a connection with the listeners. 2.0 feels really special to me, and I'm very proud of it. I hope it makes people want to come out and see the live show even more."

— Brett Young, for the album press release

== Promotion ==
In support of 2.0, Brett Young is expected to continue with his Back To Basics World Tour in 2025, which will feature performances of the new material.

To promote the album, multiple promotional singles were released. The first of which, "Goodnight Into Good Morning", was released on July 19, 2024. "Say Less", "Kiss to Forget", and "Tastes Like You" were released as the second, third, and fourth promotional singles, respectively.

The album's lead single, "Drink with You", was released alongside the album announcement on April 11, 2025. It debuted at number 41 on the Billboard Country Airplay chart.

== Critical reception ==
Professional ratings
Review scores
Source	Rating
Entertainment Focus	4/5 stars

2.0 was met with generally positive reviews from music critics, with many praising it as one of Young's most personal and refinest works to date.

Nicole Piering of Country Swag noted that on 2.0, Young "takes listeners on a journey of life, love, and everything in-between," while sounding "more confident and passionate than ever before."

Similarly, James Daykin of Entertainment Focus, highlighted the album as "one of 2025's most compelling country-pop albums", describing it as "a collection that both honours his roots and points toward the future."

== Track listing ==
2.0 track listing
No.	Title	Writer(s)	Producer(s)	Length
1.	"Drink with You"	Brett Young; Emily Weisband; Jesse Frasure; Tony Lucca	Jimmy Robbins; Noah Needleman^{[v]}	2:51
2.	"Kiss to Forget"	Young; Jimmy Robbins; Ashley Gorley; Jon Nite	Robbins	2:44
3.	"Who I Do It For" (featuring Lady A)	Young; Nite; Kyle Schlienger	Robbins; Needleman^{[v]}	2:57
4.	"Goodnight Into Good Morning"	Young; Nite; Robbins	Robbins	3:22
5.	"That Ain't Yours"	Young; Robbins; Adam Hambrick	Robbins; Needleman^{[v]}	3:01
6.	"You Don't Know What You're Missing" (featuring George Birge)	Young; Nite; Riley Green; Erik Dylan	Dann Huff	3:11
7.	"Full House"	Young; Nite; Ross Copperman	Robbins	3:15
8.	"Tastes Like You"	Young; Nite; Justin Ebach; Noah Needleman	Justin Ebach	3:21
9.	"You Still Got It"	Young; Dave Pittenger; Justin Wilson	Robbins	3:27
10.	"Say Less"	Young; Ebach; Ben Caver	Huff	3:22
11.	"In Case You Didn't Know 2.0" (featuring Hannah McFarland)	Young; Schlienger; Tyler Reeve; Trent Tomlinson	Huff	3:59
Total length:				33:30

=== Note ===
- ^{^[v]} signifies a vocal producer

== Personnel ==
Credits adapted from Tidal.

=== Musicians ===
- Brett Young – lead vocals
- Jimmy Robbins – piano (tracks 1–5, 7, 9, 10); acoustic guitar, background vocals, bass, electric guitar, keyboards, percussion, programming, synthesizer (1–5, 7, 9); mandolin (1, 3–5, 7, 9), banjo (1, 3), baritone guitar (2, 4), Hammond B3 (2), harmonica (5)
- Miles McPherson – drums (1–5, 7, 9), percussion (2, 4, 7, 9)
- Jonny Fung – pedal steel guitar (1, 3, 5, 9), Dobro guitar (1)
- Allie Lawn – cello (1, 3, 5, 9)
- Emily Weisband – background vocals (1)
- Jenee Fleenor – fiddle (2, 6–8, 10, 11)
- Ben Caver – background vocals (2, 10, 11)
- Lady A – vocals (3)
- Rob McNelley – electric guitar (6, 8, 10)
- Kris Donegan – acoustic guitar (6, 10)
- Josh Reedy – background vocals (6)
- Jimmie Lee Sloas – bass (6)
- Jerry Roe – drums (6)
- George Birge – vocals (6)
- Noah Needleman – acoustic guitar, bass, electric guitar (8)
- Justin Ebach – background vocals, programming (8)
- Paul Mabury – drums (8)
- Sara Haze – background vocals (9, 11)
- Aaron Sterling – drums (10, 11), percussion (10)
- Dann Huff – electric guitar (10, 11), programming (10)
- Todd Lombardo – acoustic guitar (10, 11)
- Mark Hill – bass (10, 11)
- Gordon Mote – Hammond B3 (10), piano (11)
- Charlie Judge – keyboards (10), Hammond B3 (11)
- Justin Niebank – programming (10, 11)
- Hannah McFarland – vocals (11)

=== Technical ===
- Justin Niebank – mixing (1, 3, 5, 6, 9–11)
- Sean Moffitt – mixing (2, 4, 7)
- Justin Ebach – mixing, engineering (8)
- Joey LaPorta – mastering (1–5, 7–9)
- Adam Ayan – mastering (6, 10, 11)
- Jimmy Robbins – engineering, digital editing (1–5, 7, 9)
- Drew Bollman – engineering (6)
- Ben Caver – engineering (10, 11)
- Buckley Miller – engineering (10, 11)
- Noah Needleman – vocal production, vocal engineering (1, 3, 5)
- Chris Small – digital editing (6, 10, 11)
- Jase Keithley – mixing assistance (2, 4)
- Chris Vanoverberghe – engineering assistance (6)
- Todd Tidwell – engineering assistance (10, 11)

== Charts ==
Chart performance for 2.0
Chart (2025)	Peak position
UK Albums Sales (OCC)	100
UK Country Albums (OCC)	2

== Release history ==
Release dates and formats of 2.0
Region	Date	Format	Label	Ref.
Various	June 20, 2025	CD; LP; digital download; streaming	Big Machine; Nashville Harbor	

== See also ==
- List of 2025 albums
