= Two Pink Lines =

Single by Eric Church

from the album Sinners Like Me
- Released: August 28, 2006
- Recorded: 2006
- Genre: Country
- Length: 3:27
- Label: Capitol Nashville
- Songwriters: Eric Church; Victoria Shaw
- Producer: Jay Joyce

Eric Church singles chronology
"How 'Bout You" (2006)	"Two Pink Lines" (2006)	"Guys Like Me" (2007)

"Two Pink Lines" is a song co-written and recorded by American country music artist Eric Church. It was released in August 2006 as the second single from his 2006 debut album Sinners Like Me. Church wrote the song with Victoria Shaw.

== Content ==
The narrator befriends and has sexual intercourse with a woman during his young adult years. She takes a pregnancy test and the male becomes concerned over the results. When the test produces a negative result, the two of them are relieved, and she leaves.

== Critical reception ==
The song received a favorable review from Deborah Evans Price of Billboard, who wrote that "Church and co-writer Shaw have carefully crafted the lyric so the listener is drawn into the story, and Church's engaging performance brings the characters to life as they sit waiting for their future to unfold." In 2017, Billboard contributor Chuck Dauphin put "Two Pink Lines" at number five on his top 10 list of Church's best songs.

== Music video ==
The music video was directed by Peter Zavadil and premiered on August 4, 2006.

== Chart performance ==
The song debuted at number 52 on the U.S. Billboard Hot Country Songs chart for the week of September 2, 2006.

Chart (2006)	Peak position
Canada Country (Billboard)	31
US Hot Country Songs (Billboard)	19
