= Here Tonight =

Single by Brett Young

from the album Ticket to L.A.
- Released: September 24, 2018
- Genre: Country pop
- Length: 3:37
- Label: Big Machine
- Songwriters: Brett Young; Ben Caver; Justin Ebach; Charles Kelley
- Producer: Dann Huff

Brett Young singles chronology
"Mercy" (2018)	"Here Tonight" (2018)	"Catch" (2019)

Music video
- "Here Tonight" on YouTube

"Here Tonight" is a song co-written and recorded by American country music artist Brett Young. It was released to radio on September 24, 2018 as the lead single to Young's second album Ticket to L.A. (2018). The song was written by Young, Ben Caver, Justin Ebach and Charles Kelley (of Lady Antebellum). "Here Tonight" gave Young his fourth consecutive number-one hit on the Billboard Country Airplay chart. It also peaked at numbers two and 42 on both the Hot Country Songs and Hot 100 charts respectively. The song was certified Platinum by the Recording Industry Association of America (RIAA), and has sold 84,000 copies in the US as of April 2019. It achieved similar chart prominence in Canada, reaching number two on the Canada Country chart and number 72 on the Canadian Hot 100 chart. An accompanying music video for the song, directed by Jim Wright, features Young on a beach while various weather phenomena happen behind him, along with a couple's date being affected by a sudden rainstorm. For promotion, Young first performed the song live on The Ellen DeGeneres Show and would make later appearances on CMT Crossroads and the 2019 CMT Music Awards with Boyz II Men.

== Content ==
"Here Tonight" is an "up-tempo love song" written by Young along with Charles Kelley, Ben Caver, and Justin Ebach. According to Young, Kelley came up with the song's melody, and Young handled most of the lyrics. He said of the song that it is about "those moments in your life that are so good and you’re so present in them that you are able, while you're in them, to realize how good they are...Anybody who is lucky enough to have had moments like that will hear the song and go there immediately." He said that the lyrics came about in a conversation with Caver and Ebach about "those moments in your life...where you're having an incredible moment, and in the middle of it you have this thought that comes to you. And that thought is, I wish that this moment could last forever."

== Commercial performance ==
"Here Tonight" reached number one on the Billboard Country Airplay chart dated April 20, 2019, which is Young's fourth consecutive number one on that chart. On the Billboard Hot 100, it debuted at number 91 the week of January 12 and reached number 88 the week after before leaving the chart. It reappeared at number 96 the week of February 9 and peaked at number 42 the week of April 27, staying on the chart for twenty weeks. It was certified platinum by the Recording Industry Association of America (RIAA) on September 24. The song has sold 84,000 copies in the United States as of April 2019.

In Canada, the track debuted at number 90 the week of March 2. Four weeks later, it peaked at number 72 the week of March 30, and remained on the chart for eleven weeks.

== Music video ==
A lyric video for "Here Tonight" premiered on Young's YouTube channel on September 13, 2018. The official music video was directed by Jim Wright and debuted in December 2018. It features Young performing on a beach while various weather phenomena happen behind him, interspersed with shots of a couple whose plans to go out on a date are affected by a sudden rainstorm.

== Live performances ==
On December 14, 2018, Young first performed "Here Tonight" on The Ellen DeGeneres Show. On February 28, 2019, he performed the song with Boyz II Men during a taping of CMT Crossroads that wasn't part of the show, but was uploaded on their YouTube channel on August 16. On June 5, he reunited with the group at the 2019 CMT Music Awards, performing the track as part of a mashup with their song "Water Runs Dry".

== Charts ==
=== Weekly charts ===
Chart (2018–2019)	Peak position
Canada Hot 100 (Billboard)	72
Canada Country (Billboard)	2
US Billboard Hot 100	42
US Country Airplay (Billboard)	1
US Hot Country Songs (Billboard)	2

=== Year-end charts ===
Chart (2019)	Position
US Country Airplay (Billboard)	24
US Hot Country Songs (Billboard)	24

== Certifications ==
Region	Certification	Certified units/sales
Australia (ARIA)	Gold	35,000^{‡}
United States (RIAA)	2× Platinum	2,000,000^{‡}
^{‡} Sales+streaming figures based on certification alone.
