= You Didn't =

Single by Brett Young

from the album Weekends Look a Little Different These Days
- Released: November 15, 2021
- Genre: Country
- Length: 3:45
- Label: Big Machine
- Songwriters: Brett Young; Ashley Gorley; Jon Nite; Jimmy Robbins
- Producer: Dann Huff

Brett Young singles chronology
"Not Yet" (2021)	"You Didn't" (2021)	"Dance with You" (2023)

"You Didn't" is a song co-written and recorded by American country music singer Brett Young. It was released on November 15, 2021, as the third single from his third studio album Weekends Look a Little Different These Days.

== Content ==
Young wrote the song with Ashley Gorley, Jon Nite, and Jimmy Robbins during a songwriting session. The four wanted to write a song about a breakup but found it difficult as all four of them are in relationships. However, at the songwriting session, Young recalled that before marrying his wife, Taylor, he had previously broken up with her. Taylor also appears in the song's corresponding music video.

== Commercial performance ==
"You Didn't" entered top ten on Billboard Country Airplay on the chart dated March 24, 2023. This marked the song's 70th week on the chart, setting a new record for both the slowest ascent into the top ten and the longest chart run overall.

== Charts ==
=== Weekly charts ===
Weekly chart performance for "You Didn't"
Chart (2021–2023)	Peak position
Canada Country (Billboard)	26
US Billboard Hot 100	63
US Country Airplay (Billboard)	10
US Hot Country Songs (Billboard)	18

=== Year-end charts ===
Year-end chart performance for "You Didn't"
Chart (2023)	Position
US Country Airplay (Billboard)	39
US Hot Country Songs (Billboard)	57

== Certifications ==
Certifications for "You Didn't"
Region	Certification	Certified units/sales
United States (RIAA)	Gold	500,000^{‡}
^{‡} Sales+streaming figures based on certification alone.
