= Sinners Like Me =

Studio album by Eric Church
- Released: July 18, 2006
- Recorded: 2005–06
- Genre: Country
- Length: 47:05
- Label: Capitol Nashville
- Producer: Jay Joyce

Eric Church chronology
Sinners Like Me (2006)	Carolina (2009)

Singles from Sinners Like Me
- 1. "How 'Bout You" Released: January 30, 2006; 2. "Two Pink Lines" Released: August 28, 2006; 3. "Guys Like Me" Released: January 22, 2007; 4. "Sinners Like Me" Released: September 10, 2007

Professional ratings
Review scores
Source	Rating
AllMusic	4/5 stars
Country Standard Time	
Slant Magazine	2.5/5 stars

Sinners Like Me is the debut studio album from American country music artist Eric Church. It was released on July 18, 2006, through Capitol Records Nashville. Singles released from the album include "How 'Bout You", "Two Pink Lines", "Guys Like Me", and the title track, which respectively reached No. 14, No. 19, No. 17 and No. 51 on the Hot Country Songs charts. Although not released as a single, the track "Lightning" was made into a music video, which aired on the networks CMT and GAC. The album has sold 590,000 copies in the US as of November 29, 2013, and it was certified Platinum by the RIAA for a million units in combined sales and streams on April 29, 2019.

== Track listing ==
All tracks are written by Eric Church, with additional co-writers as noted.

No.	Title	Writer(s)	Length
1.	"Before She Does"	Trent Willmon; Jeremy Spillman	3:19
2.	"Sinners Like Me"	Spillman	3:52
3.	"How 'Bout You"	Brett Beavers; Brandon Church	3:49
4.	"These Boots"	Michael P. Heeney	3:48
5.	"What I Almost Was"	Heeney	3:21
6.	"The Hard Way"	Heeney; Casey Beathard	3:32
7.	"Guys Like Me"	Deric Ruttan	3:11
8.	"Lightning"		5:14
9.	"Can't Take It with You"	Marla Cannon-Goodman; Beathard	4:24
10.	"Pledge Allegiance to the Hag" (featuring Merle Haggard)	Beavers	4:25
11.	"Two Pink Lines"	Victoria Shaw	3:27
12.	"Livin' Part of Life"	Liz Rose; Walt Wilkins	4:29
Total length:			47:05

== Personnel ==
- Casey Beathard – choir
- Brett Beavers – choir
- Richard Bennett – electric guitar
- Katherine Blasingame – choir
- Bruce Bouton – pedal steel guitar
- Caldwell County Choir – choir
- Brandon Church – choir
- Eric Church – choir, lead vocals
- Perry Coleman – background vocals
- Dan Dugmore – dobro, pedal steel guitar
- Chris Feinstein – bass guitar
- Kenny Greenberg – electric guitar
- Merle Haggard – vocals on "Pledge Allegiance to the Hag"
- Jason Hall – tuba
- Aubrey Haynie – fiddle
- Kevin Heeney – choir
- Michael Heeney – choir
- Sean Heeney – choir
- Mark Hill – bass guitar
- Jay Joyce – bass guitar, acoustic guitar, electric guitar, keyboards, piano
- Wally Mitchum – choir
- Patricia Norman – choir
- Russ Pahl – pedal steel guitar
- Mickey Raphael – harmonica
- Giles Reaves – djembe, marimbula, pump organ, shaker
- Tammy Rogers – fiddle
- Mindy Smith – background vocals
- Ed Smoak – choir
- Jeremy Spillman – choir
- Bryan Sutton – banjo, acoustic guitar, mandolin
- Russell Terrell – background vocals
- Chris Thile – mandolin
- Jay Williams – choir
- Craig Wright – cajón, drums

== Charts ==
=== Weekly charts ===
Chart (2006)	Peak position
US Billboard 200	29
US Top Country Albums (Billboard)	7

=== Year-end charts ===
Chart (2007)	Position
US Top Country Albums (Billboard)	72

== Certifications ==
Region	Certification	Certified units/sales
United States (RIAA)	Platinum	1,000,000^{‡}
^{‡} Sales+streaming figures based on certification alone.
