= How 'Bout You =

Single by Eric Church

from the album Sinners Like Me
- Released: January 30, 2006
- Recorded: 2005
- Genre: Country
- Length: 3:49
- Label: Capitol Nashville
- Songwriters: Brett Beavers; Eric Church; Brandon Church
- Producer: Jay Joyce

Eric Church singles chronology
"How 'Bout You" (2006)	"Two Pink Lines" (2006)

"How 'Bout You" is a song co-written and recorded by American country music artist Eric Church. It released in January 2006 as his debut single and the first from his 2006 debut album Sinners Like Me. The song peaked at number 14 on the US Billboard Hot Country Songs chart. Church wrote this song with Brandon Church (his brother) and Brett Beavers.

== Music video ==
The music video was directed by Scott Speer. It features Church holding the camera, and seeming to direct the video as he lets other people hold the camera from a construction worker outside, and people in a bar, to the stage of where the rest of the video is shots of him playing the song on stage, and the audience. It reached #1 on CMT's Top 20 Countdown in 2006.

== Chart performance ==
"How 'Bout You" debuted at number 60 on the U.S. Billboard Hot Country Songs for the week of February 18, 2006.

Chart (2006)	Peak position
Canada Country (Radio & Records)	24
US Hot Country Songs (Billboard)	14
US Billboard Hot 100	85

== Certifications ==
Region	Certification	Certified units/sales
United States (RIAA)	Gold	500,000^{‡}
^{‡} Sales+streaming figures based on certification alone.
