= Ticket to L.A. =

2018 album by Brett Young

Studio album by Brett Young
- Released: December 7, 2018
- Studio: Blackbird (Nashville); Sound Stage (Nashville); Dog in the Background (Nashville); Village (Los Angeles)
- Genre: Country
- Length: 47:10
- Label: Big Machine
- Producer: Dann Huff

Brett Young chronology
Brett Young (2017)	Ticket to L.A. (2018)	Weekends Look a Little Different These Days (2021)

Singles from Ticket to L.A.
- 1. "Here Tonight" Released: September 24, 2018; 2. "Catch" Released: June 3, 2019

Ticket to L.A. is the second studio album by American country music singer Brett Young. It was released on December 7, 2018, through Big Machine Label Group. Its lead single, "Here Tonight" (co-written by Charles Kelley of the group Lady Antebellum), was released in September 2018. The track listing for the album was released on September 10, 2018.

== Background ==
The album is Young's second album released under the Big Machine label. Young co-wrote ten of the album's thirteen tracks. The album was produced by Dann Huff, with engineer Justin Niebank and executive producer Jimmy Harnen. Collaborators on the album include Gavin DeGraw, Ashley Gorley, Shane McAnally, Hillary Lindsey, Charles Kelley and Ross Copperman. The first song written for the album is "Used to Missin' You" he co-wrote with Jimmy Robbins and Jon Nite, which was intended for his previous album Brett Young. He wrote "Chapters" with Gavin Degraw, who wanted the song to be about Young's story. This album has a lighter feel than the previous album, although it ended with a sombre ballad "Don't Wanna Write This Song", which is intended to mirror "Mercy" of that album.

== Commercial performance ==
Ticket to L.A. debuted at number one on Billboard Top Country Albums and number 15 on the US Billboard 200, selling 27,000 copies (37,000 in equivalent album units) in the first week. As of February 2020, the album has sold 75,900 copies in the United States.

== Track listing ==
Ticket to L.A. track listing
No.	Title	Writer(s)	Length
1.	"Ticket to L.A."	Brett Young; Zach Crowell; Jon Nite	3:29
2.	"Here Tonight"	Young; Ben Caver; Justin Ebach; Charles Kelley	3:37
3.	"Catch"	Young; Ross Copperman; Ashley Gorley	3:16
4.	"1, 2, 3 Mississippi"	Young; Ebach; Nite	3:27
5.	"Let It Be Mine"	Copperman; Shane McAnally; Nite	3:37
6.	"Where You Want Me"	Young; Jessie Jo Dillon; McAnally	3:41
7.	"Used to Missin' You"	Young; Nite; Jimmy Robbins	3:51
8.	"Change Your Name"	Copperman; Matt Jenkins; Nite	3:33
9.	"Chapters" (featuring Gavin DeGraw)	Young; Copperman; Gavin DeGraw	3:57
10.	"The Ship and the Bottle"	Nicolle Galyon; Chase McGill; Nite	4:29
11.	"Reason to Stay"	Young; Nite; Robbins; Emily Warren	3:11
12.	"Runnin' Away from Home"	Young; Crowell; Hillary Lindsey	3:08
13.	"Don't Wanna Write This Song"	Young; Crowell; Sean McConnell	3:49
Total length:			47:10

== Personnel ==
Adapted from liner notes

=== Musicians ===
- Ben Caver – background vocals (tracks 1–4, 7–13)
- Ross Copperman – programming (tracks 3, 9)
- Zach Crowell – programming (tracks 1, 12)
- Gavin DeGraw – piano (track 9), duet vocals (track 9)
- Charles Dixon – viola (track 13), violin (track 13)
- Justin Ebach – programming (track 4)
- Paul Franklin – steel guitar (tracks 3–6, 8, 10, 12)
- Nick Gold – cello (track 13)
- Sara Haze – background vocals (track 12)
- Dann Huff – bouzouki (track 1), Dobro (track 3), electric slide guitar (track 3), 12-string guitar (tracks 3, 10), electric guitar (all tracks), gut string guitar (tracks 5, 10), Hammond B-3 organ (track 7), keyboards (track 2), little guitar (track 3), mandolin (tracks 1, 3), mandocello (track 1), piano (tracks 8, 11), programming (tracks 1, 2, 4, 7, 10), soloist (tracks 2–4, 6, 7, 10, 11), synthesizer (track 7)
- David Huff – programming (all tracks)
- Charlie Judge – keyboards (tracks 1–7, 9, 10, 12, 13), programming (tracks 1–3, 5–9, 13), string arrangements (track 13), strings (tracks 3, 8), synthesizer (track 8)
- Noah Needleman – background vocals (track 5)
- Jerry Roe – drums (tracks 1, 11)
- Jimmy Robbins – programming (track 11)
- Jimmie Lee Sloas – bass guitar (all tracks)
- Aaron Sterling – drums (tracks 2–10, 12, 13)
- Russell Terrell – background vocals (track 6)
- Ilya Toshinsky – banjo (tracks 4, 10, 12), 12-string acoustic guitar (track 1), acoustic guitar (all tracks), ganjo (track 7), hi-strung acoustic guitar (track 2), mandolin (track 7)
- Derek Wells – baritone guitar (track 13), electric guitar (all tracks), slide guitar (track 1)
- Brett Young – lead vocals (all tracks)

=== Technical ===
- Adam Ayan – mastering
- Gabe Burch – additional recording assistance (tracks 1, 5, 9, 13)
- Ben Caver – additional recording
- Mike Griffith – production coordination
- Jimmy Harnen – executive production
- Dann Huff – production (all tracks), digital editing (tracks 1–9, 11–13)
- Laurel Kittleson – production coordination
- Seth Morton – recording (all tracks)
- Noah Needleman – additional recording (tracks 1, 5, 9, 13)
- Justin Niebank – recording (all tracks), mixing (all tracks)
- Chris Small – digital editing (all tracks)
- Janice Soled – production coordination
- Brianna Steinitz – production coordination

=== Visuals ===
- Sandi Spika Borchetta – art direction
- Justin Ford – art direction, graphic design
- Riker Brothers – photography

== Charts ==
=== Weekly charts ===
Weekly chart performance for Ticket to L.A.
Chart (2018)	Peak position
Australian Albums (ARIA)	93
Canadian Albums (Billboard)	38
US Billboard 200	15
US Top Country Albums (Billboard)	1

=== Year-end charts ===
2019 year-end chart performance for Ticket to L.A.
Chart (2019)	Position
US Top Country Albums (Billboard)	19

2020 year-end chart performance for Ticket to L.A.
Chart (2020)	Position
US Top Country Albums (Billboard)	49

== Certifications ==
Certifications for Ticket to L.A.
Region	Certification	Certified units/sales
United States (RIAA)	Gold	500,000^{‡}
^{‡} Sales+streaming figures based on certification alone.
