= Dance with You Tonight =

Dance with You Tonight may refer to:

- "Dance with You Tonight", a song by Laufey from Everything I Know About Love, 2022
- "Dance with You Tonight", a song by Robert Plant from Carry Fire, 2017
