= Mercy (Brett Young song) =

Single by Brett Young

from the album Brett Young
- Released: February 20, 2018
- Genre: Country
- Length: 3:35
- Label: Big Machine
- Songwriter(s): Brett Young; Sean McConnell
- Producer(s): Dann Huff

Brett Young singles chronology
"Like I Loved You" (2017)	"Mercy" (2018)	"Here Tonight" (2018)

"Mercy" is a song written by Brett Young and Sean McConnell, and recorded by Young for his eponymous debut studio album (2017). It was released to country radio February 20, 2018 as the album's fourth and final single.

The song has peaked at numbers two and one on the Billboard Hot Country Songs and Country Airplay charts, respectively. In Canada, the song reached number eight on the Canada Country airplay chart. An accompanying music video was directed by Seth Kupersmith and co-stars Tiffany Brouwer. "Mercy" has been certified triple Platinum by the RIAA, and has sold 489,000 copies in the United States as of April 2019.

== Critical reception ==
Sterling Whitaker of Taste of Country wrote that Young is "at his vulnerable best" on "Mercy" and described the song's production as a "model of restraint." In a review of Brett Young, Matt Bjorke of Roughstock wrote that every song on the album "showcase Brett Young as a potential superstar and perhaps no song does that better than the Adele-like "Mercy."

== Chart performance ==
"Mercy" debuted at number 49 on the Hot Country Songs chart dated July 15, 2017 as an album track. Following its release as a single, the song re-entered at the same position on the chart dated February 17, 2018. It has since reached a peak position of 10. "Mercy" debuted at number 56 on the Country Airplay chart dated February 17, 2018, and has peaked at number 1 for two weeks. In May 2018, "Mercy" entered the Hot 100 at number 97. In Canada, "Mercy" has reached a peak position of 27 on the Canada Country chart. On March 25, 2019, the single was certified double platinum by the Recording Industry Association of America (RIAA) for combined sales and streaming data of over two million units in the United States. The single has sold 498,000 copies in the United States as of April 2019.

== Music video ==
An accompanying music video for "Mercy" was directed by Seth Kupersmith and was filmed over two days in Encino, Los Angeles and at the White Sands National Monument in New Mexico. Tiffany Brouwer plays Young's estranged love interest in the video. The video premiered March 9, 2018 through Apple Music and became widely available on March 12. Alternating between shots of the couple in love and walking alone in a desert, the video was intended to be "dream-like."

== Charts ==
=== Weekly charts ===
Chart (2018)	Peak position
Canada (Canadian Hot 100)	56
Canada Country (Billboard)	8
US Billboard Hot 100	29
US Adult Contemporary (Billboard)	29
US Country Airplay (Billboard)	1
US Hot Country Songs (Billboard)	2

=== Year-end charts ===
Chart (2018)	Position
US Billboard Hot 100	95
US Country Airplay (Billboard)	32
US Hot Country Songs (Billboard)	9

== Certifications ==
Region	Certification	Certified units/sales
Australia (ARIA)	Platinum	70,000^{‡}
United States (RIAA)	4× Platinum	4,000,000^{‡}
^{‡} Sales+streaming figures based on certification alone.
