= Weekends Look a Little Different These Days =

Studio album by Brett Young
- Released: June 4, 2021
- Genre: Country
- Length: 25:36
- Label: Big Machine
- Producer: Dann Huff

Brett Young chronology
Ticket to L.A. (2018)	Weekends Look a Little Different These Days (2021)	Across the Sheets (2023)

Singles from Weekends Look a Little Different These Days
- 1. "Lady" Released: April 30, 2020; 2. "Not Yet" Released: April 26, 2021; 3. "You Didn't" Released: November 15, 2021

Weekends Look a Little Different These Days is the third studio album by American country music singer Brett Young. It was released on June 4, 2021, via Big Machine Label Group. The album has produced three singles, "Lady", "Not Yet" and "You Didn't", the first of which has reached number one on the Billboard Country Airplay chart. Young co-wrote all eight tracks on the album.

== Background ==
Weekends Look a Little Different These Days is Young's third album released under the Big Machine label. The title is a reference to Young's life as a father to his daughter, Presley. Although most of the tracks are about his family, Young also includes songs about his past experiences, as well as the experiences of his co-writers. One such track, "Dear Me", details a narrator speaking to his younger self, in the midst of heartbreak, and encouraging him to move on.

Young confirmed the album's track listing on April 23, 2021. Like his previous two albums, the album is produced by Dann Huff. "Lady", "Not Yet" and "You Didn't" have been issued as singles.

== Critical reception ==
Pip Ellwood-Hughes of Entertainment Focus gave the album a generally positive review. Although he criticized the project for only containing eight songs, his review was favorable toward Young's "soulful" singing voice and the lyrical content of the title track and "Lady" in particular. An uncredited review published by Off the Record was also positive, with the reviewer noting themes of fatherhood and family in the lyrics, as well as a "groovier sound" on the second half of the album.

== Track listing ==
All tracks are written by Brett Young, with additional co-writers as noted.

Weekends Look a Little Different These Days track listing
No.	Title	Writer(s)	Length
1.	"Weekends Look a Little Different These Days"	Ben Caver; Zach Crowell	3:04
2.	"Lady"	Ross Copperman; Jon Nite	3:14
3.	"This"	Justin Ebach; Amy Wadge; Geoff Warburton	2:54
4.	"Dear Me"	Ebach; Ashley Gorley; Nite; Jimmy Robbins	3:40
5.	"Leave Me Alone"	Jesse Frasure; Steven Lee Olsen	3:03
6.	"Not Yet"	Kelly Archer; Ebach	2:54
7.	"You Got Away with It"	Ebach; Gorley; Nite; Robbins	3:02
8.	"You Didn't"	Gorley; Nite; Robbins	3:45
Total length:			25:36

== Personnel ==
Adapted from liner notes.

- Ben Caver – background vocals (all tracks)
- Ross Copperman – programming (track 2)
- Zach Crowell – electric guitar (track 1), programming (track 1)
- David Dorn – B-3 organ (tracks 1, 8), keyboards (tracks 1, 3, 6, 8), synthesizer (tracks 3, 8)
- Justin Ebach – acoustic guitar (tracks 3, 6), acoustic slide guitar (track 6), synthesizer (track 6), programming (track 3), background vocals (tracks 3, 6), gang vocals (track 7)
- Paul Franklin – steel guitar (track 8)
- Jesse Frasure – acoustic guitar (track 5), electric guitar (track 5), B-3 organ (track 5), programming (track 5)
- Ashley Gorley – gang vocals (track 7)
- Sara Haze – background vocals (track 8)
- Dann Huff – acoustic guitar (tracks 2, 5), tenor acoustic guitar (track 4), bass guitar (track 7), electric guitar (all tracks), electric guitar solo (tracks 2, 5, 8), mandolin (tracks 4, 5, 7), B-3 organ (tracks 6, 7), keyboards (track 7), synthesizer (tracks 4, 6), synth bass (tracks 5, 7), programming (tracks 2, 3, 5, 7)
- David Huff – programming (all tracks except 2)
- Elliot Huff – drums (track 2)
- Kirk "Jelly Roll" Johnson – harmonica (track 7)
- Charlie Judge – B-3 organ (track 7), keyboards (tracks 4, 5), piano (track 2), strings (track 2), synthesizer (tracks 1, 2)
- Rob McNelley – electric guitar (tracks 1, 3, 6, 8)
- Justin Niebank – programming (all tracks)
- Jon Nite – gang vocals (track 7)
- Jimmy Robbins – acoustic guitar (track 7), electric guitar (tracks 4, 7), mandolin (track 7), programming (tracks 4, 7, 8), gang vocals (track 7)
- Jimmie Lee Sloas – bass guitar (all tracks)
- Aaron Sterling – drums (all tracks except 2), percussion (track 1)
- Ilya Toshinsky – acoustic guitar (all tracks except 2), mandolin (track 3), ganjo (track 7)
- Derek Wells – electric guitar (tracks 4, 5, 7), slide electric guitar solo (track 4)
- Brett Young – lead vocals (all tracks), background vocals (track 4, 5), gang vocals (track 7)

== Charts ==
Chart performance for Weekends Look a Little Different These Days
Chart (2021)	Peak position
US Billboard 200	79
US Top Country Albums (Billboard)	9
