= Lady (Brett Young song) =

2020 song by Brett Young

Single by Brett Young

from the album Weekends Look a Little Different These Days
- Released: April 30, 2020
- Genre: Country
- Length: 3:13
- Label: Big Machine
- Songwriters: Brett Young; Jon Nite; Ross Copperman
- Producer: Dann Huff

Brett Young singles chronology
"I Do" (2020)	"Lady" (2020)	"Not Yet" (2021)

Music video
- "Lady" on YouTube

"Lady" is a song recorded by American country music artist Brett Young. It was released on April 30, 2020, as the lead single from his third studio album, Weekends Look a Little Different These Days, which was released on June 4, 2021. The song was written by Young, along with Jon Nite and Ross Copperman.

Young wrote the song for his daughter, Presley Elizabeth, and his wife Taylor Mills.

== Music video ==
The video was released on June 18, 2020, directed by Seth Kupersmith. It was shot with a camera and a drone and following social distancing guidelines. The family is shown getting ready for a day at the beach and going to the pool.

== Charts ==
=== Weekly charts ===
Chart (2020–2021)	Peak position
Canada Hot 100 (Billboard)	68
Canada Country (Billboard)	9
US Billboard Hot 100	52
US Country Airplay (Billboard)	1
US Hot Country Songs (Billboard)	7

=== Year-end charts ===
Chart (2020)	Position
US Hot Country Songs (Billboard)	68

Chart (2021)	Position
US Country Airplay (Billboard)	22
US Hot Country Songs (Billboard)	47

== Certifications ==
Region	Certification	Certified units/sales
Australia (ARIA)	Gold	35,000^{‡}
Canada (Music Canada)	Gold	40,000^{‡}
United States (RIAA)	Platinum	1,000,000^{‡}
^{‡} Sales+streaming figures based on certification alone.
