= Catch (Brett Young song) =

Single by Brett Young

from the album Ticket to L.A.
- Released: June 3, 2019
- Genre: Country
- Length: 3:16
- Label: Big Machine
- Songwriters: Brett Young; Ross Copperman; Ashley Gorley
- Producer: Dann Huff

Brett Young singles chronology
"Here Tonight" (2018)	"Catch" (2019)	"I Do" (2020)

"Catch" is a song co-written and recorded by American country music artist Brett Young. It was released on June 3, 2019 as the second single from his second studio album Ticket to L.A. (2018). Co-written by Young, Ross Copperman and Ashley Gorley, the song is about a man getting drinks after work and being smitten by a girl at the bar. "Catch" gave Young his fifth consecutive number-one hit on the Billboard Country Airplay chart. It also reached numbers five and 29 on both the Hot Country Songs and Hot 100 charts respectively. It was certified Platinum by the Recording Industry Association of America (RIAA), denoting sales of over one million units in the United States. The song also charted in Canada, reaching number three on the Canada Country chart and number 73 on the Canadian Hot 100. An accompanying music video for the single, directed by Seth Kupersmith, tells a semi-autobiographical story about Young's previous dream of playing in Major League Baseball ending after a career-ending injury and falling in love with his college girlfriend.

== Content ==
Brett Young co-wrote the song with Ross Copperman and Ashley Gorley. Lyrically, the song details a man going out for drinks after work with friends and then unexpectedly falling in love with a girl he meets at the bar.

== Music video ==
The music video for "Catch" premiered on June 3, 2019. It was directed by Seth Kupersmith and was filmed at Swayze Field at the University of Mississippi, Young's alma-mater. Young does not sing in the video. It is semi-autobiographical of Young's career path in that it follows his dream of pitching Major League Baseball, which is dashed when he suffers a career-ending injury, and falling in love with his college sweetheart.

== Chart performance ==
"Catch" debuted at number 48 on the Billboard Country Airplay chart the week of June 8, 2019. It also debuted at number 43 on the Hot Country Songs chart the week of July 7. It went on to rank atop the Mediabase country radio singles chart, and was the most played and heard song for the week of April 11, 2020. The song peaked at number one on the Hot Country Songs chart for the week of April 18, giving Young his fifth consecutive number one on that chart. On the week of February 8, 2020, "Catch" debuted at number 96 on the Billboard Hot 100. Ten weeks later, it peaked at number 29 the week of April 18. The song reappeared in the same position it debuted on the week of June 20 before leaving completely, and remained on the chart for seventeen weeks. It was certified platinum by the RIAA in the US on February 25, 2021 for combined sales and streams of over a million units.

In Canada, the track debuted at number 92 on the Canadian Hot 100 the week it peaked on the Billboard Hot 100. It peaked at number 73 the week of May 2, and stayed on the chart for four weeks.

=== Weekly charts ===
Chart (2019–2020)	Peak position
Canada Hot 100 (Billboard)	73
Canada Country (Billboard)	3
US Billboard Hot 100	29
US Country Airplay (Billboard)	1
US Hot Country Songs (Billboard)	5

=== Year-end charts ===
Chart (2019)	Position
US Hot Country Songs (Billboard)	92
Chart (2020)	Position
US Country Airplay (Billboard)	13
US Hot Country Songs (Billboard)	34

== Certifications ==
Region	Certification	Certified units/sales
Canada (Music Canada)	Platinum	80,000^{‡}
United States (RIAA)	Platinum	1,000,000^{‡}
^{‡} Sales+streaming figures based on certification alone.
