= Across the Sheets =

Studio album by Brett Young
- Released: August 4, 2023
- Studio: Blackbird (Nashville); Sound Stage (Nashville); Dog in the Background (Nashville)
- Genre: Country
- Length: 28:10
- Label: Big Machine
- Producer: Dann Huff

Brett Young chronology
Weekends Look a Little Different These Days (2021)	Across the Sheets (2023)	2.0 (2025)

Singles from Across the Sheets
- 1. "Dance with You" Released: June 26, 2023

Across the Sheets is the fourth studio album by American country music singer Brett Young. It was released on August 4, 2023, via Big Machine Label Group. The album was preceded by the release of "Dance with You" in June 2023.

== Content ==
Young co-wrote seven of the album's eight tracks, with the exception being his cover of Tim McGraw's "Don't Take the Girl". It also includes a re-recorded version of "You Ain't Here to Kiss Me", which was originally featured on Young's self-titled debut album (2017).

A deluxe edition titled Across the Sheets (Barefoot Edition), containing a total of 16 tracks, including the standard tracklist plus acoustic versions of each song, was released on May 31, 2024, via Big Machine. It includes a collaboration with American singer-songwriter, Ashley Cooke.

== Track listing ==
Across the Sheets track listing
No.	Title	Writer(s)	Length
1.	"Dance with You"	Brett Young; Jordan Minton; Jimmy Robbins	3:04
2.	"Let Go Too Soon"	Young; Chris LaCorte; Jon Nite	3:27
3.	"Back to Jesus"	Young; Justin Ebach; Nite	3:14
4.	"Uncomfortable"	Young; Ryan Marrone; Nite	3:36
5.	"Love Goes On"	Young; Sam Ellis; Julia Michaels	3:20
6.	"I Did This to Me"	Young; Ross Copperman; Gabe Simon	3:32
7.	"You Ain't Here to Kiss Me (2022)"	Young; Matt Alderman; Tiffany Goss	3:37
8.	"Don't Take the Girl"	Craig Martin; Larry Johnson	4:21
Total length:			28:11

Barefoot Edition track listing
No.	Title	Writer(s)	Length
9.	"Dance with You" (acoustic)	Young; Minton; Robbins	3:10
10.	"Let Go Too Soon" (featuring Ashley Cooke; acoustic)	Young; LaCorte; Nite	3:20
11.	"Back to Jesus" (acoustic)	Young; Ebach; Nite	3:01
12.	"Uncomfortable" (acoustic)	Young; Marrone; Nite	3:31
13.	"Love Goes On" (acoustic)	Young; Ellis; Michaels	3:05
14.	"I Did This to Me" (acoustic)	Young; Copperman; Simon	3:17
15.	"You Ain't Here to Kiss Me (2022)" (acoustic)	Young; Alderman; Goss	3:35
16.	"Don't Take the Girl" (acoustic)	Martin; Johnson	4:17
Total length:			55:27

== Personnel ==
Credits adapted from the album's liner notes and Tidal.

=== Musicians ===
- Brett Young – lead vocals (all tracks), background vocals (tracks 5, 6)
- Derek Wells – electric guitar
- Aaron Sterling – drums (all tracks), percussion (2, 3, 5–8), bongos (6)
- Dann Huff – programming (1–4, 8), acoustic guitar (1, 2, 4, 8), synthesizer (1, 2, 5), electric guitar (1, 3, 4, 6, 8), electric guitar solo (2, 4, 8), bouzouki (3, 4), Dobro (6); Moog bass, B-3 organ (1); piano (2), octave 12-string acoustic guitar (7)
- Justin Niebank – programming (1–7)
- Ben Caver – background vocals (1–7)
- Paul Franklin – steel guitar (1–5, 7)
- Jimmie Lee Sloas – bass (1–5, 7)
- Charlie Judge – B-3 organ (1, 4–8), programming (1), synthesizer (3–8), piano (5); Rhodes piano, clavinet (6)
- David Huff – programming (1–3, 5–8)
- Ilya Toshinskiy – acoustic guitar (1)
- Jimmy Robbins – programming (1)
- Kris Donegan – electric guitar (2, 3, 6, 8), acoustic guitar (3–8)
- Noah Needleman – background vocals (4, 9–11); acoustic guitar, background vocals (9–16); percussion (9–15), Dobro (9, 10, 12–15); banjo, mandolin (9, 12–15); bass, electric guitar (10)
- Ryan Marrone – acoustic guitar (4)
- Nathan Chapman – bass (6, 8)
- Stuart Duncan – fiddle (8)
- Josh Reedy – background vocals (8)
- Sara Haze – background vocals (9, 11, 13, 16)
- Ashley Cooke – vocals (10)

=== Technical ===
- Dann Huff – production
- Jimmy Harnen – executive production
- Justin Niebank – mixing (all tracks), recording (1)
- John "JFK" Kaplan – mixing, mastering (9–16)
- Adam Ayan – mastering (1–8)
- Drew Bollman – recording (2–5, 7), additional mix engineering (all tracks)
- Steve Marcantonio – recording (6, 8)
- Noah Needleman – recording (9–16)
- Sean Badum – recording assistance (1–5, 7)
- Zach Kuhlman – recording assistance (6, 8)
- Michael Walter – recording assistance (6, 8)
- Ben Caver – additional recording (1–7)
- David Huff – digital editing (1–3, 5, 6, 8)
- Chris Small – digital editing (1–3, 5, 6, 8)
- Mike "Frog" Griffith – production management

=== Visuals ===
- Seth Kupersmith – album package artistry, photography
- Brett Young – art direction
- Braden Carney – design
- Justin Ford – design

== Charts ==
Chart performance for Across the Sheets
Chart (2023)	Peak position
US Top Country Albums (Billboard)	39
