= Like I Loved You =

Single by Brett Young

from the album Brett Young
- Released: July 17, 2017
- Recorded: 2016
- Genre: Country
- Length: 3:28
- Label: Big Machine
- Songwriters: Brett Young; Jesse Lee
- Producer: Dann Huff

Brett Young singles chronology
| "In Case You Didn't Know" (2017) | "Like I Loved You" (2017) | "Mercy" (2018) |

"Like I Loved You" is a song recorded by American country pop singer Brett Young and co-written by Young and Jesse Lee. It was released to country radio on July 17, 2017 as the third single from his debut self-titled album (2017).

The song has sold 256,000 copies in the United States as of March 2018.

== Music video ==
The accompanying music video was directed by Phillip Lopez and premiered July 31, 2017. It was shot in the Laurel Canyon region of Los Angeles, California, and depicts a narrative of unrequited love.

== Promotion and live performances ==
Young performed "Like I Loved You" and previous single "In Case You Didn't Know" on Jimmy Kimmel Live! on July 18, 2017.

== Charts ==
=== Weekly charts ===
| Chart (2017–2018) | Peak position |
|---|---|
| Canada Hot 100 (Billboard) | 91 |
| Canada Country (Billboard) | 1 |
| US Billboard Hot 100 | 46 |
| US Country Airplay (Billboard) | 1 |
| US Hot Country Songs (Billboard) | 3 |

=== Year-end charts ===
| Chart (2017) | Position |
|---|---|
| US Hot Country Songs (Billboard) | 65 |
| US Radio Songs (Billboard) | 72 |

| Chart (2018) | Position |
|---|---|
| US Country Airplay (Billboard) | 29 |
| US Hot Country Songs (Billboard) | 51 |

== Certifications ==
| Region | Certification | Certified units/sales |
|---|---|---|
| Australia (ARIA) | Gold | 35,000^{‡} |
| United States (RIAA) | 2× Platinum | 2,000,000^{‡} |
^{‡} Sales+streaming figures based on certification alone.
