= Sleep Without You =

Single by Brett Young

from the album Brett Young
- Released: April 11, 2016
- Genre: Country
- Length: 3:07
- Label: Republic Nashville
- Songwriter(s): Brett Young; Justin Ebach; Kelly Archer
- Producer(s): Dann Huff

Brett Young singles chronology
"Sleep Without You" (2016)	"In Case You Didn't Know" (2017)

"Sleep Without You" is a song recorded by American country pop singer Brett Young and co-written by Young, Justin Ebach, and Kelly Archer. Its official release to radio was on April 11, 2016, as the lead single from his debut self-titled album. It has sold 377,000 copies in the United States as of January 2017.

== Critical reception ==
Billy Dukes of Taste of Country gave the song a favorable review, writing that "Young’s R&B influences come out in the sincerity and warmth of his delivery, not the sonic nature of this mostly acoustic jam."

== Commercial performance ==
The song first entered the Country Airplay chart at number 58 for the week of March 5, 2016, and debuted on the Hot Country Songs chart two months later at number 45 on May 14, 2016. It peaked at number three on the chart for the week of December 3, 2016. It also peaked at number two on Billboard's Country Airplay chart the following week, beaten by Florida Georgia Line's number one, "May We All". It reached number one on the Mediabase Country chart. It has sold 377,000 copies in the United States as of January 2017. On September 5, 2017, the single was certified platinum by the Recording Industry Association of America (RIAA) for sales of over a million digital copies in the United States.

== Music video ==
The music video was directed by Shane Drake and appeared on CMT, GAC, and Vevo in March 2016. The music video was filmed in Malibu, California, and co-stars Miss USA 2015 Olivia Jordan.

== Charts ==
=== Weekly charts ===
Chart (2016)	Peak position
Canada (Canadian Hot 100)	93
Canada Country (Billboard)	7
US Billboard Hot 100	47
US Country Airplay (Billboard)	2
US Hot Country Songs (Billboard)	3

=== Year-end charts ===
Chart (2016)	Position
US Country Airplay (Billboard)	30
US Hot Country Songs (Billboard)	34

Chart (2017)	Position
US Hot Country Songs (Billboard)	95

== Certifications ==
Region	Certification	Certified units/sales
Australia (ARIA)	Gold	35,000^{‡}
United States (RIAA)	2× Platinum	2,000,000^{‡}
^{‡} Sales+streaming figures based on certification alone.
