= Brett Young (album) =

Studio album by Brett Young
- Released: February 10, 2017
- Recorded: 2014–2017
- Genre: Country
- Length: 41:55
- Label: Big Machine
- Producer: Dann Huff

Brett Young chronology
Brett Young (2016)	Brett Young (2017)	Ticket to L.A. (2018)

Singles from Brett Young
- 1. "Sleep Without You" Released: April 11, 2016; 2. "In Case You Didn't Know" Released: January 9, 2017; 3. "Like I Loved You" Released: July 17, 2017; 4. "Mercy" Released: February 20, 2018

Brett Young is the debut studio album by American the country pop singer Brett Young, and his fourth album overall. Young is a featured co-writer on 11 out of the 12 tracks on the album, which was produced by Dann Huff and recorded in Nashville. The album was released on February 10, 2017, through Big Machine Label Group. The album was produced by Dann Huff, known for working with crossover-friendly country pop acts like Rascal Flatts and Keith Urban.

== Background ==
Young co-wrote 11 of the 12 songs on the album, including the four singles from the album, "Sleep Without You", "In Case You Didn't Know", "Like I Loved You" and "Mercy". Six of these songs had been previously released on his self-titled EP. Young stressed the importance of honesty in his music; according to him, of the 12 songs in the album, 10 of them he had lived, and the other two he can completely relate to. He said that the album is "a very clear picture of me as a person." Young also said: "I really wanted to make sure that I put a lot of myself into these songs so that fans were given a chance to get to know me when they listened. Watching people sing these songs back to us at live shows means so much more knowing that they aren’t just connection to words but also to my genuine life experience. I think vulnerability is important in songwriting and I feel like show that."

== Critical reception ==
Laura Hostelley of Sounds Like Nashville reviewed the album positively, and described Young's debut effort as "straying away from the 'bro-country' trend, to mark his own genuine path by not being afraid to be vulnerable in matters of the heart."

== Commercial performance ==
Brett Young debuted at number two on the Top Country Albums chart, and number 18 on the US Billboard 200, based on 17,800 copies sold (25,000 equivalent album units when tracks and streams are included). On August 7, 2026, the album was certified double platinum by the Recording Industry Association of America (RIAA) for combined sales and album-equivalent units of over two million units in the United States. The album has sold 253,400 copies in the United States as of January 2019.

== Track listing ==
Brett Young track listing
No.	Title	Writer(s)	Length
1.	"Sleep Without You"	Brett Young; Justin Ebach; Kelly Archer	3:08
2.	"Close Enough"	Young; Jon Nite; Jimmy Robbins	3:07
3.	"Like I Loved You"	Young; Jesse Lee	3:28
4.	"In Case You Didn't Know"	Young; Trent Tomlinson; Tyler Reeve; Kyle Schlienger	3:46
5.	"Olivia Mae"	Young; Ben Caver	3:42
6.	"Left Side of Leavin'"	Young; Robbins; Nite	3:36
7.	"You Ain't Here to Kiss Me"	Young; Matt Alderman; Tiffany Goss	3:39
8.	"Back on the Wagon"	Young; Josh Thompson; Jessi Alexander	3:35
9.	"Makin' Me Say"	Nite; Cary Barlowe; Zach Crowell	3:10
10.	"Memory Won't Let Me"	Young; Steven Jones; Justin Ebach	3:32
11.	"Beautiful Believer"	Young; Annie Wildgen; Jason Adamo	3:34
12.	"Mercy"	Young; Sean McConnell	3:35
Total length:			41:53

== Personnel ==
Credits adapted from the album's liner notes.

=== Musicians ===
- J. Bonilla – programming (tracks 1, 4, 6)
- Joeie Canaday – bass guitar (tracks 1, 3, 4, 6, 7, 11)
- Ben Caver – background vocals (tracks 1, 5–7, 10)
- Paul Franklin – steel guitar (tracks 3, 4, 7)
- Dann Huff – acoustic guitar (tracks 4, 11), electric guitar (tracks 1–6, 8–11), bouzouki (track 6), electric guitar solo (tracks 1, 6), ganjo (track 4), keyboards (tracks 6, 7), mandolin (tracks 1, 6, 11), percussion (track 7), programming (track 7), slide guitar (track 6), additional electric guitar (track 7)
- Charlie Judge – keyboards (tracks 1–12), piano (track 12), programming (tracks 2, 9)
- Rob McNelley – electric guitar (tracks 1, 3, 4, 6, 7, 11), electric guitar solo (track 7)
- Noah Needleman – background vocals (track 2)
- Jerry Roe – drums (tracks 2, 9)
- Jimmie Lee Sloas – bass guitar (tracks 2, 5, 8–10)
- Aaron Sterling – drums (tracks 1, 3–8, 10, 11)
- Russell Terrell – background vocals (tracks 3, 4, 8, 9, 11, 12)
- Ilya Toshinsky – acoustic guitar (tracks 1–5, 7–10), mandolin (track 1), resonator acoustic guitar (track 7)
- Derek Wells – electric guitar (2, 5, 6, 8–11)
- Brett Young – lead vocals (all tracks), background vocals (track 6)

=== Technical ===
- Adam Ayan – mastering
- Eric Berdon – additional recording (track 12)
- Mike Griffith – production coordination
- Jimmy Harnen – executive production
- Dann Huff – production
- Laurel Kittleson – production coordination
- Seth Morton – recording assistance (tracks 5, 8, 10)
- Sean Neff – editing (tracks 1, 3–8, 10, 11)
- Justin Niebank – recording (tracks 1–4, 6, 7, 9, 11, 12), mixing (all tracks)
- Chris Small – editing (tracks 2, 9, 12)
- Janice Soled – production coordination (tracks 2, 5, 8–10, 12)
- Brianna Steinitz – production coordination
- Russell Terrell – additional recording (tracks 3, 4, 8, 9, 11, 12)

=== Visuals ===
- Chapman Baehler – photography
- Sandi Spika Borchetta – art direction
- Justin Ford – graphic design
- Becky Reiser – art direction
- Taylor Tompkins – hair and make-up
- Amanda Valentine – wardrobe

== Charts ==
=== Weekly charts ===
Weekly chart performance for Brett Young
Chart (2017)	Peak position
Canadian Albums (Billboard)	26
Scottish Albums (Official Charts)	75
US Billboard 200	18
US Top Country Albums (Billboard)	2

=== Year-end charts ===
Year-end chart performance for Brett Young
Chart	Year	Position
US Billboard 200	2017	70
US Top Country Albums (Billboard)	2017	7
US Billboard 200	2018	61
US Top Country Albums (Billboard)	2018	8
US Billboard 200	2019	161
US Top Country Albums (Billboard)	2019	15
US Top Country Albums (Billboard)	2020	26
US Top Country Albums (Billboard)	2021	57

=== Decade-end charts ===
Decade-end chart performance for Brett Young
Chart (2010–2019)	Position
US Top Country Albums (Billboard)	20

== Certifications ==
Certifications for Brett Young
Region	Certification	Certified units/sales
Canada (Music Canada)	Platinum	80,000^{‡}
United States (RIAA)	2× Platinum	2,000,000^{‡} / 253,400
^{‡} Sales+streaming figures based on certification alone.
