= In Case You Didn't Know (song) =

Single by Brett Young

from the album Brett Young
- Released: January 9, 2017
- Recorded: 2016
- Genre: Country
- Length: 3:44
- Label: Republic Nashville
- Songwriters: Brett Young; Trent Tomlinson; Tyler Reeve; Kyle Schlienger
- Producer: Dann Huff

Brett Young singles chronology
"Sleep Without You" (2016)	"In Case You Didn't Know" (2017)	"Like I Loved You" (2017)

Alternative cover
- Alternative cover featuring Hannah McFarland

"In Case You Didn't Know" is a song recorded by American country pop singer Brett Young and co-written by Young, Trent Tomlinson, Tyler Reeve, and Kyle Schlienger. It was released to radio on January 9, 2017 as the second single from his debut self-titled album (2017). The song has been certified Diamond by the RIAA, the first song by Young to receive a Diamond certification.

The song was written in 2016 during a working trip to Puerto Vallarta, Mexico. Young co-wrote the song at the retreat with Tyler Reeve, Kyle Schlienger, and Trent Tomlinson. According to Young, the inspiration for the song came from a story told by Peters about his wife Brandy: "[Peters] said when he was a kid, his mom would not be the type to say "I love you" but he seemed to always know it in some way. Peters married his wife in March 1998 and he wanted to show his love for her by co-writing this song".

In 2017, Young released a duet version of the song with Irish singer Una Healy.

== Commercial performance ==
The song first entered on Billboard's Hot Country Songs chart at number 45 for the week of August 6, 2016 after it was featured on The Highway in July 2016, selling 9,000 copies that week. It also peaked at number two for a record of 16 consecutive weeks but it was kept out of the top spot by "Body Like a Back Road" by Sam Hunt. The song debuted on the Country Airplay chart at number 52 for the week of December 24, 2016 before its official release in January 2017. It peaked at number one for the week of June 10, 2017, making it Young's first number one hit of his career. The song reached over a million in actual sales by January 2018. On March 20, 2024, the single was certified Diamond by the Recording Industry Association of America (RIAA) for over 10 million combined sales and stream units in the United States, his first song to achieve this feat. It has sold 1,263,000 copies in the United States as of November 2019. The song also reached number 19 on the Billboard Hot 100, making Brett one of the few male country artists to have a top 20 hit on the pop chart from their debut album.

== Music video ==
The music video was directed by Jennifer Rothlein.

Young climbs out of the back of a taxi cab and, after a few backstage shots, performs the song to an empty Tivoli Theatre consisting of only his desired woman in the audience (played by Sara Morgan). She soon disappears, however, and the video ends as Young walks out the front doors of the theatre and down the sidewalk into the distance.

== Charts ==
=== Weekly charts ===
Chart (2017)	Peak position
Canada Hot 100 (Billboard)	50
Canada Country (Billboard)	1
US Billboard Hot 100	19
US Country Airplay (Billboard)	1
US Hot Country Songs (Billboard)	2

=== Year-end charts ===
Chart (2017)	Position
Canada Country (Billboard)	5
US Billboard Hot 100	57
US Country Airplay (Billboard)	10
US Hot Country Songs (Billboard)	2

=== Decade-end charts ===
Chart (2010–2019)	Position
US Hot Country Songs (Billboard)	11

== Certifications ==
Region	Certification	Certified units/sales
Australia (ARIA)	3× Platinum	210,000^{‡}
Canada (Music Canada)	7× Platinum	560,000^{‡}
New Zealand (RMNZ)	2× Platinum	60,000^{‡}
United Kingdom (BPI)	Gold	400,000^{‡}
United States (RIAA)	Diamond	10,000,000^{‡}
^{‡} Sales+streaming figures based on certification alone.

== See also ==
- List of number-one country singles of 2017 (Canada)
- List of number-one country singles of 2017 (U.S.)
