= Brett Young (singer) =

American singer-songwriter (born 1981)

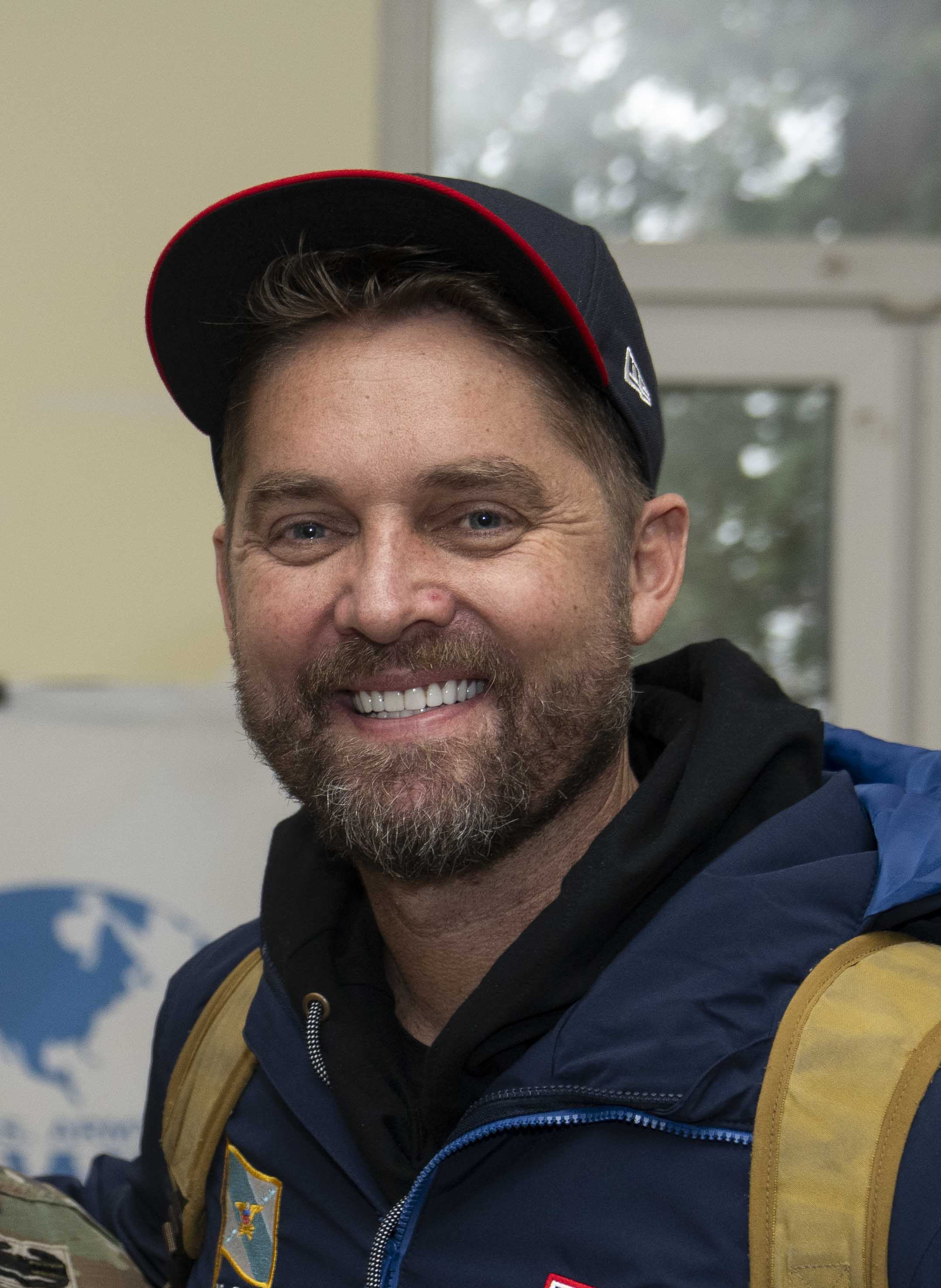
- Young in 2023

Background information
- Born: Brett Charles Young; March 23, 1981 (age 45); Anaheim, California
- Origin: Huntington Beach, California
- Genres: Country pop
- Occupations: Singer; songwriter; guitarist
- Instruments: Vocals; guitar
- Years active: 2007–present
- Label: BMLG
- Spouse: Taylor Mills (m. 2018)
- Website: brettyoungmusic.com

Brett Charles Young (born March 23, 1981) is an American country pop singer, songwriter and guitarist from Anaheim, California. He was a college baseball pitcher but took up songwriting after an elbow injury. His self-titled debut EP, produced by Dann Huff, was released by Republic Nashville on February 12, 2016. The lead single, "Sleep Without You", was released on April 11 of that year, and he had a major success with a follow-up single, "In Case You Didn't Know". He released his second major label album Ticket to L.A. in 2018, and the third, Weekends Look a Little Different These Days, in 2021.

== Early life ==
Young was born in Anaheim, Orange County. He attended Calvary Chapel High School in Costa Mesa, California and then went to the University of Mississippi (Ole Miss), Irvine Valley College, and California State University, Fresno (Fresno State). He began singing in the late 1990s when he stepped in to replace a leader of a band who did not show up during a Christian worship meeting at high school.

Young was a pitcher on his high school baseball team and led the squad to a CIF championship. He went to Ole Miss on a baseball scholarship in 1999 after turning down pre-draft selection by both Tampa Bay Devil Rays and Minnesota Twins. In his one-season on the Rebel baseball team in 2000, he earned a varsity letter posting two wins and two saves. He then lettered for one season at Irvine Valley before moving to Fresno State. However, his pursuit of a professional baseball career was cut short by an elbow injury while at college in Fresno in 2003.

== Music career ==
According to Young, he was inspired by Gavin DeGraw after he heard DeGraw's album Chariot as well as by singer-songwriter Jeremy Steele. Young decided to return to music. He independently released a self-titled four-song EP in 2007, Make Believe in 2011, followed by the albums Brett Young, On Fire, and Broken Down in 2012–13.

After being based for eight years in Los Angeles, Young moved to Nashville. He was soon signed by the Big Machine Label Group in August 2015.

=== 2016–present: Brett Young EP and album ===
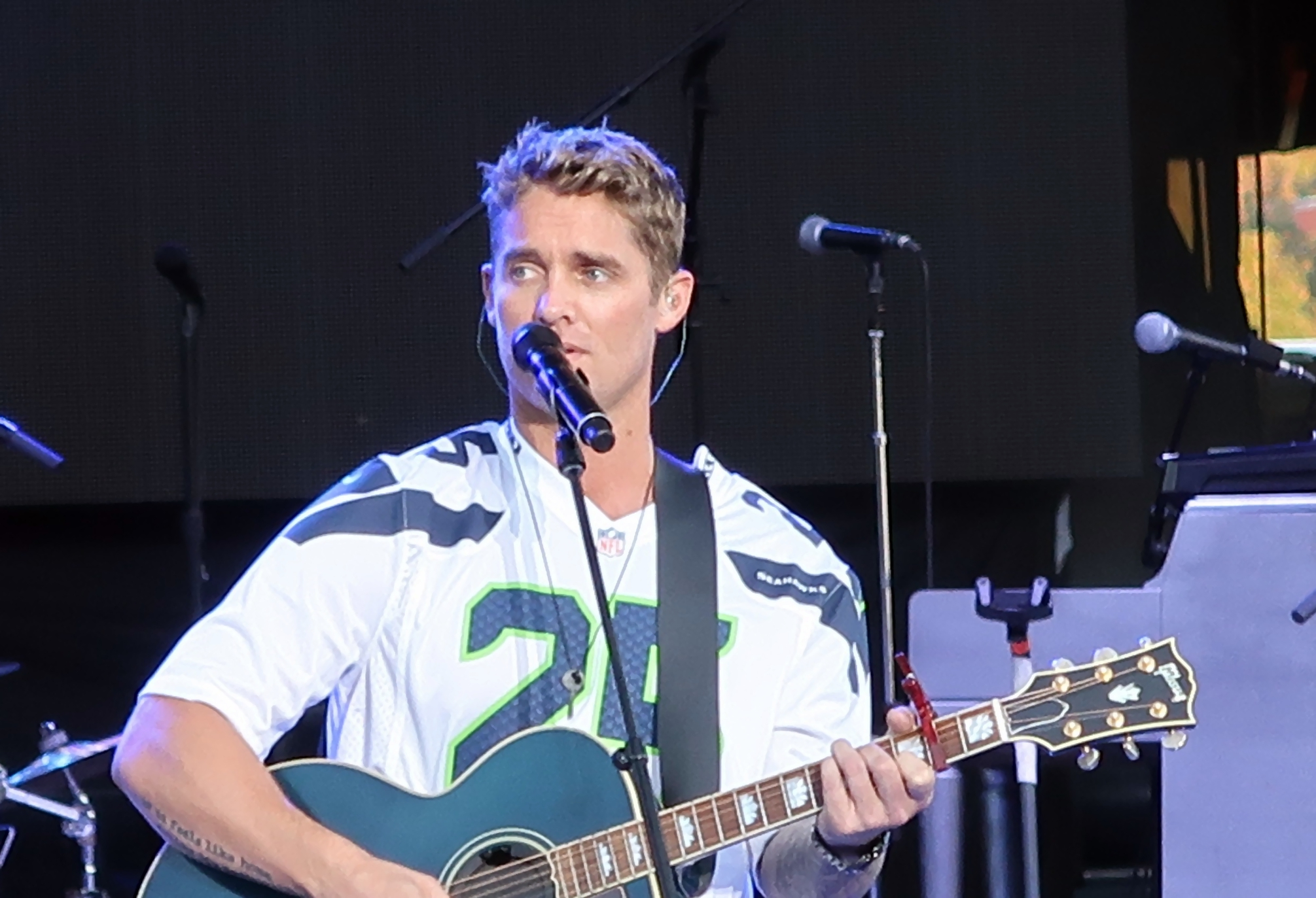
Young performing in 2017

In February 2016, Young released a six-song self-titled EP. "Sleep Without You" was released as the first single from the EP in April 2016. He wrote the song with Justin Ebach and Kelly Archer. The second single to be released from the album "In Case You Didn't Know", was released on January 9, 2017, becoming Young's signature song. The song was his first to reach number one on the Country Airplay chart and it was certified Diamond by RIAA. The album's third single, "Like I Loved You" released to country radio on July 17, 2017.

On February 10, 2017, Young released his self-titled debut studio album Brett Young. The album was produced by Dann Huff, and released through Big Machine Label Group. It debuted at number two on the Top Country Albums chart. Young tours with his band, which includes lead guitarist Keaton Simons, drummer Billy Hawn, keys/guitarist Matt Ferranti, and bass guitarist Noah Needleman.

=== 2018–2020: Ticket to L.A. ===
In December 2018, Young released his sophomore album, Ticket to L.A.. The lead single for the album, "Here Tonight", which he co-wrote with Ben Caver, Justin Ebach, and Charles Kelley from Lady A, was released in September 2018. It was number one on the Country Airplay in April 2019. The album's second single, "Catch" released to country radio on June 3, 2019.

=== 2020–present: Weekends Look a Little Different These Days ===
In April 2020, Young released the single "Lady", which he wrote about his wife and daughter. It is the lead-off single to his third studio album Weekends Look a Little Different These Days, which was released on June 4, 2021. "Lady" reached number one on the Country Airplay chart in April 2021. The album's second single "Not Yet" was released in the same month. However, it was less successful, only peaking at number 37 on the Country Airplay chart. It was Young's first single to miss the Top 10, as well as his lowest-charting single to date and the first to miss number one since his 2016 debut single "Sleep Without You". A third single, "You Didn't", was released in November 2021. In October 2021, he released a Christmas album Brett Young & Friends Sing the Christmas Classics.

== Personal life ==
In February 2018, Young and his girlfriend Taylor Mills were engaged. They were married in Palm Desert, California on November 3, 2018. On April 6, 2019, they announced that they were expecting their first child in the fall of 2019. Their daughter Presley was born on October 21, 2019. On January 27, 2021, they announced that they were expecting their second child in the summer of 2021. Their second daughter Rowan was born on July 21, 2021.

== Discography ==
- Brett Young (2017)
- Ticket to L.A. (2018)
- Weekends Look a Little Different These Days (2021)
- Across the Sheets (2023)
- 2.0 (2025)

== Awards and nominations ==
| Year | Awards | Category | Recipient/work | Result | Ref |
|---|---|---|---|---|---|
| 2017 | Academy of Country Music Awards | New Male Vocalist of the Year | Himself | Nominated | |
| 2017 | CMT Music Awards | Breakthrough Video of the Year | "In Case You Didn't Know" | Nominated | |
| 2017 | Teen Choice Awards | Choice Country Song | "In Case You Didn't Know" | Nominated | |
| 2017 | Country Music Association Awards | New Artist of the Year | Himself | Nominated | |
| 2018 | Academy of Country Music Awards | New Male Vocalist of the Year | Himself | Won | |
| 2018 | Billboard Music Awards | Top Country Song | "In Case You Didn't Know" | Nominated | |
| 2018 | Billboard Music Awards | Top Country Album | Brett Young | Nominated | |
| 2018 | CMT Music Awards | Video of the Year | "Mercy" | Nominated | |
| 2018 | Country Music Association Awards | New Artist of the Year | Himself | Nominated | |
| 2019 | Teen Choice Awards | Choice Country Artist | Himself | Nominated | |

== Television appearances ==
| Year | Title | Role | Notes |
|---|---|---|---|
| 2014 | Chrisley Knows Best | Himself | Performed at a Party |
| 2019 | CMT Crossroads | Himself | Alongside Boyz II Men and Brooks & Dunn |
| 2019 | American Idol | Himself | Seventeenth season Top 24 |
| 2019 | The Bachelor | Himself | 23rd season (Colton Underwood) |
