= 50th Annual Country Music Association Awards =

2016 music awards in Nashville

- Date: November 2, 2016
- Location: Bridgestone Arena, Nashville, Tennessee, U.S.
- Hosted by: Brad Paisley; Carrie Underwood

Highlights
- Most wins: Chris Stapleton (2)
- Most nominations: Maren Morris; Chris Stapleton (5 each)

Television/radio coverage
- Network: ABC
- Viewership: 12.5 million

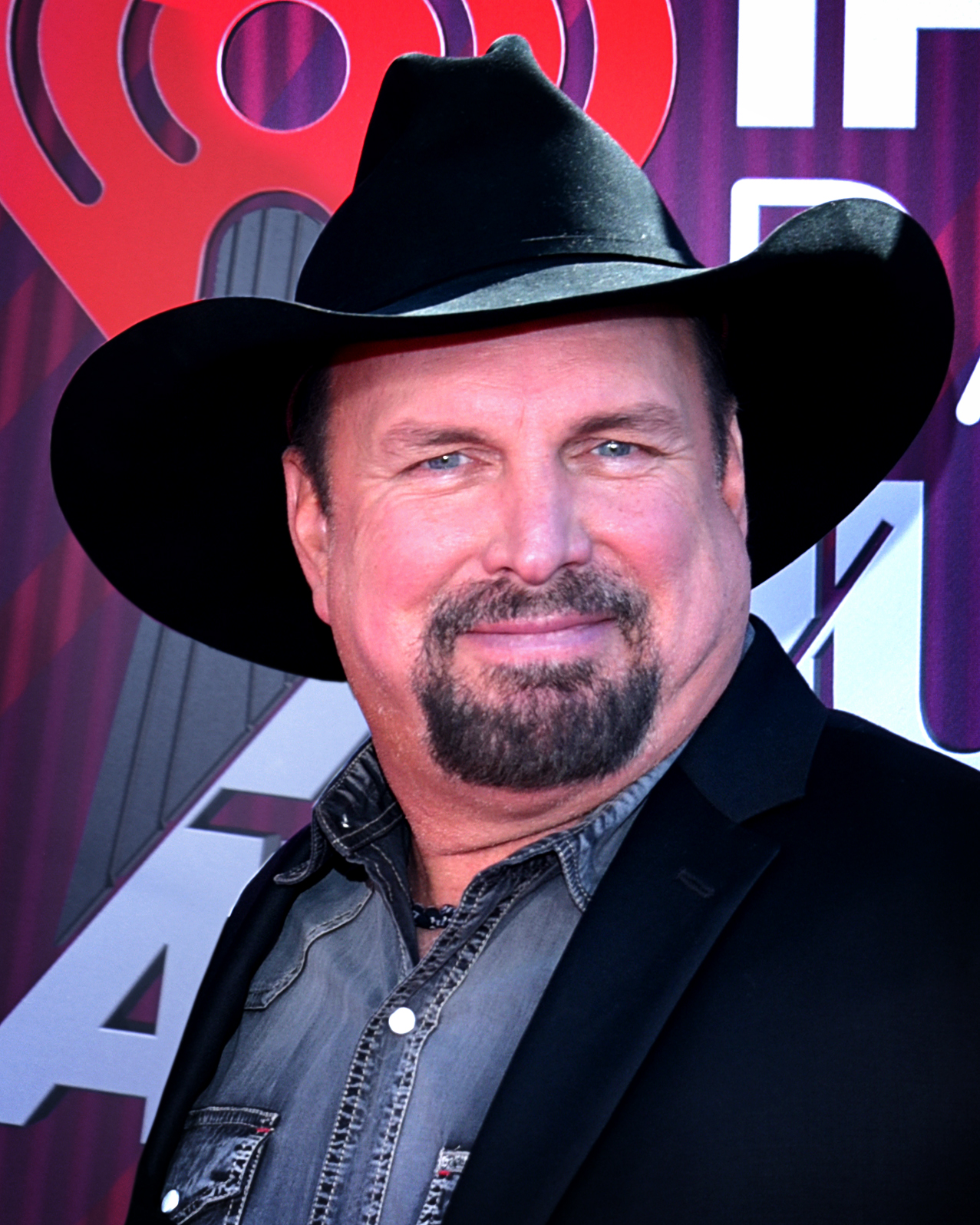
Garth Brooks, Entertainer of the Year recipient.

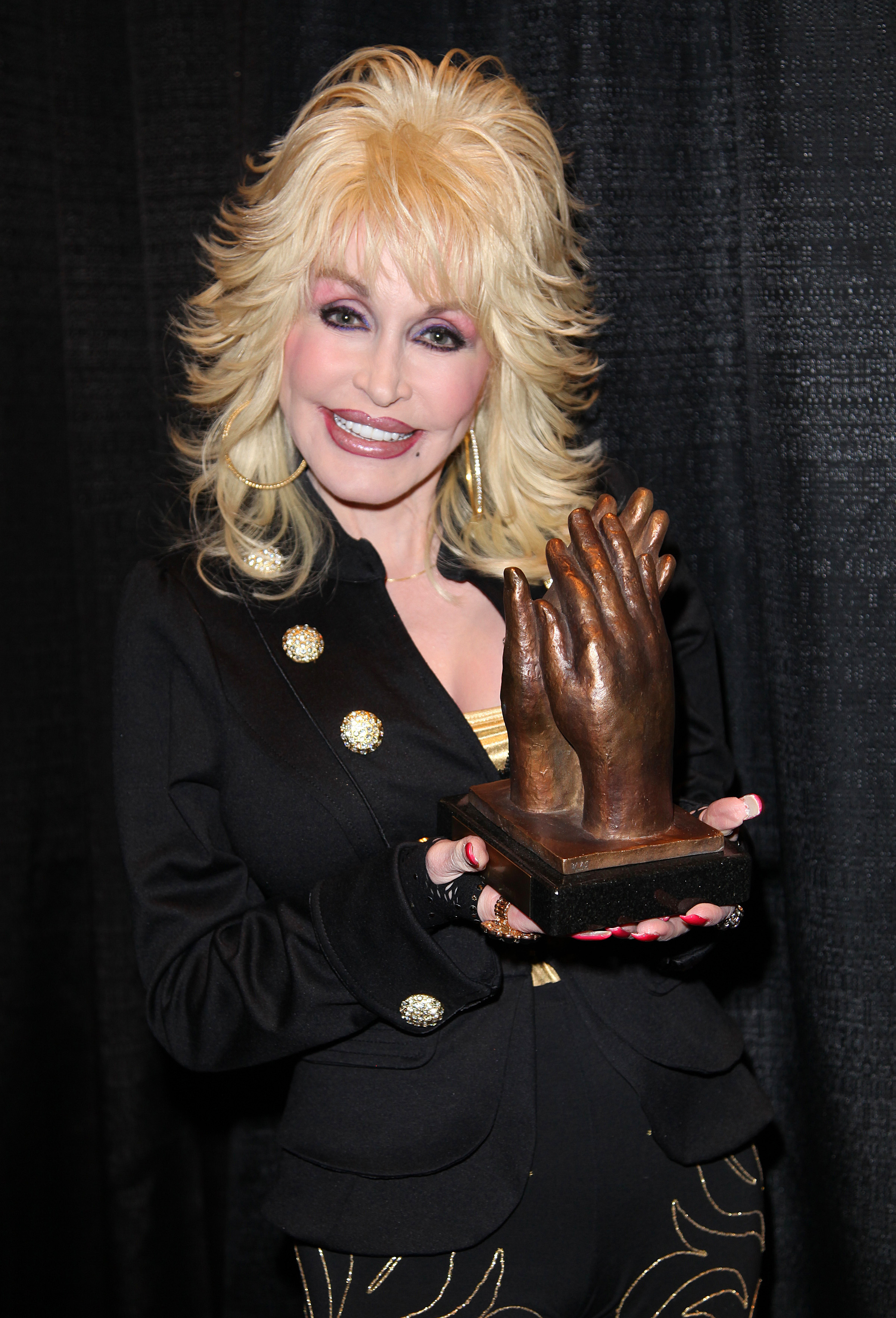
Dolly Parton, Willie Nelson Lifetime Achievement Award recipient.

The 50th Annual Country Music Association Awards, commonly known as CMA 50 or the 50th CMA Awards, were held on November 2, 2016 at the Bridgestone Arena in Nashville. The ceremony recognizes some of the best country music released during the eligibility period (between July 1, 2015 and July 20, 2016). It is the eleventh ceremony to be held at the Arena, the seventeenth to be held in November and the ninth night to be co-hosted by country stars Brad Paisley and Carrie Underwood. The ceremony was directed by Paul Miller.

== Background ==
As it was the 50th anniversary of the awards, the Country Music Association ran an extensive promotional campaign and CMA Executive Producer Robert Deaton stated that the aim of the ceremony was to include a lot of "heritage artists" and honor the history of country music, stressing that there would be less of a focus on artists promoting their current singles as is usually the case so that greater time could be spent including "exciting throwbacks".

Nominations for the 50th CMA Awards were revealed on October 5, 2016 during Good Morning America by Dierks Bentley, Keith Urban and Cam live from the Grand Ole Opry.

== Winners and nominees ==
The winners are in Bold.

Entertainer of the Year	Album of the Year
**Garth Brooks**; Luke Bryan; Chris Stapleton; Carrie Underwood; Keith Urban	**Mr. Misunderstood** — **Eric Church**; Black — Dierks Bentley; Hero — Maren Morris; Ripcord — Keith Urban; Storyteller — Carrie Underwood
Male Vocalist of the Year	Female Vocalist of the Year
**Chris Stapleton**; Dierks Bentley; Eric Church; Tim McGraw; Keith Urban	**Carrie Underwood**; Kelsea Ballerini; Miranda Lambert; Maren Morris; Kacey Musgraves
Vocal Group of the Year	Vocal Duo of the Year
**Little Big Town**; Lady Antebellum; Old Dominion; Rascal Flatts; Zac Brown Band	**Brothers Osborne**; Dan + Shay; Florida Georgia Line; Joey + Rory; Maddie & Tae
Single of the Year	Song of the Year
**"Die a Happy Man" — Thomas Rhett**; "Humble and Kind" — Tim McGraw; "My Church" — Maren Morris; "Nobody to Blame" — Chris Stapleton; "Record Year" — Eric Church	**"Humble and Kind" — Lori McKenna**; "Die a Happy Man" — Sean Douglas, Thomas Rhett, and Joe Spargur; "My Church" — Busbee and Maren Morris; "Record Year" — Eric Church and Jeff Hyde; "Burning House" — Cam, Tyler Johnson, and Jeff Bhasker
New Artist of the Year	Musician of the Year
**Maren Morris**; Kelsea Ballerini; Brothers Osborne; Old Dominion; Cole Swindell	**Dann Huff, Guitar**; Jerry Douglas, Dobro; Paul Franklin, Pedal Steel; Brent Mason, Guitar; Derek Wells, Guitar
Music Video of the Year	Musical Event of the Year
**"Fire Away" — Chris Stapleton; (Dir. Tim Mattia)**; "Humble and Kind" — Tim McGraw; (Dir. Wes Edwards); "Record Year" — Eric Church; (Dir. Reid Long and John Peets); "Somewhere on a Beach" — Dierks Bentley; (Dir. Wes Edwards); "Burning House" — Cam; (Dir. Trey Fanjoy)	**"Different for Girls" — Dierks Bentley and Elle King**; "Home Alone Tonight" —Luke Bryan and Karen Fairchild; "The Fighter" — Keith Urban and Carrie Underwood; "Think of You" — Chris Young and Cassadee Pope; "You Are My Sunshine" — Morgane Stapleton and Chris Stapleton
Willie Nelson Lifetime Achievement Award
**Dolly Parton**

=== Special Recognition Awards ===
Award	Recipient	Ref
CMA Pinnacle Award	Kenny Chesney	
International Artist Achievement Award	Kacey Musgraves	
Wesley Rose International Media Achievement Award	Bob Harris	
Jeff Walker Global Country Artist Award	Gord Bamford	
International Country Broadcaster Award	Paul McGuire	
Jo Walker Meador International Award	Jeff Walker	

- Note: only the Pinnacle Award and the Willie Nelson Lifetime Achievement Award were presented during the ceremony itself

== Performers ==
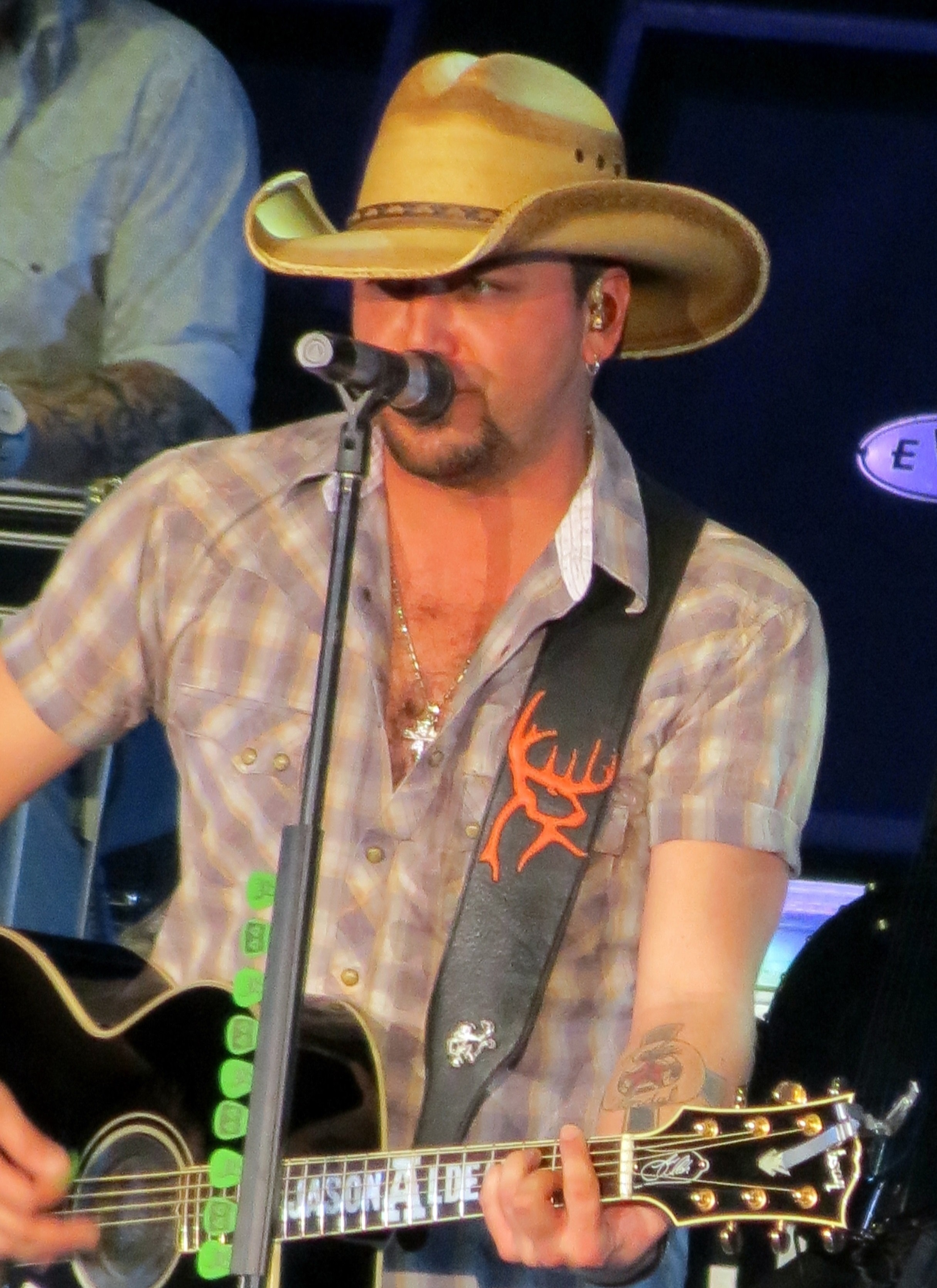
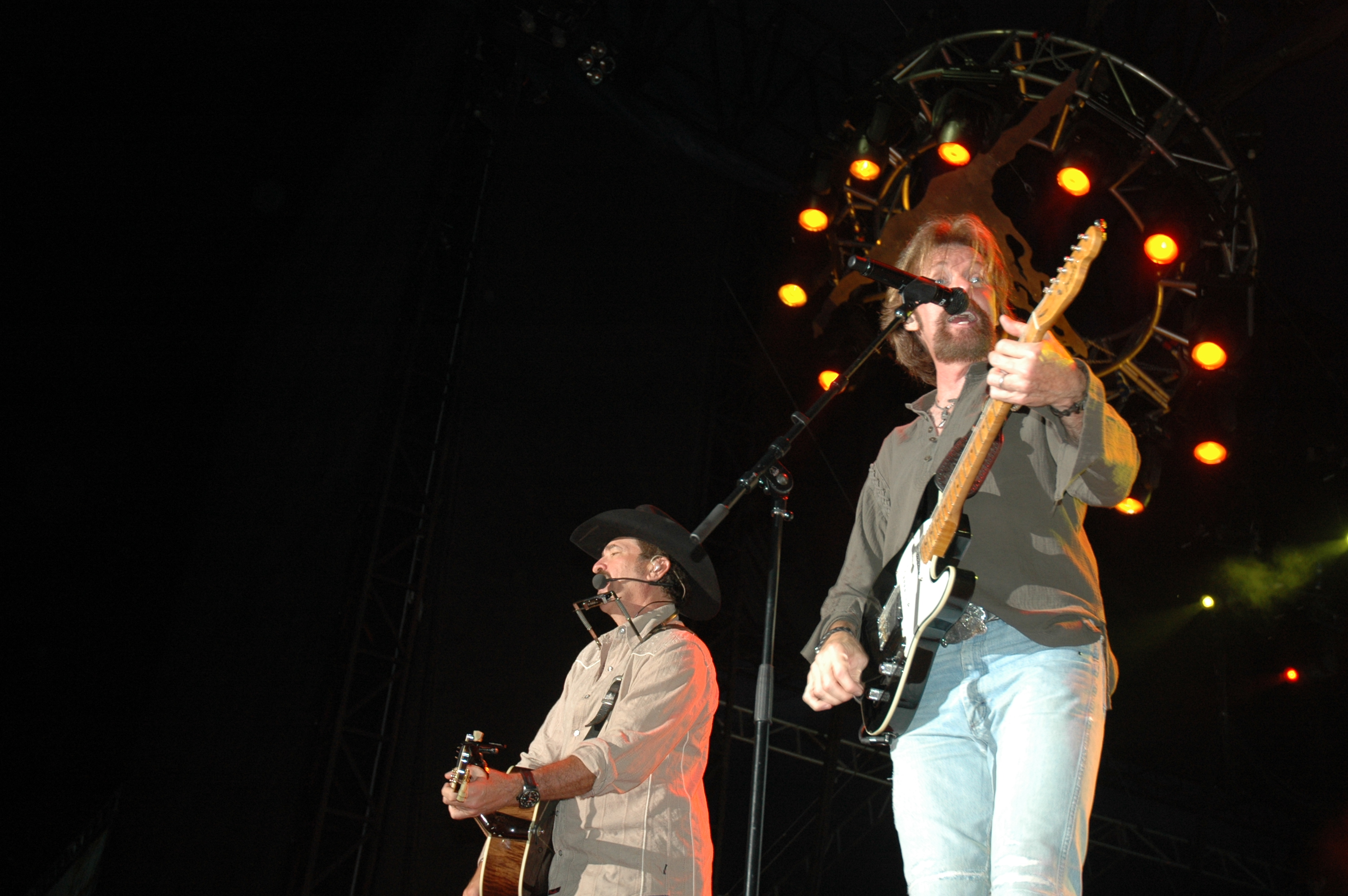
Jason Aldean helped Brooks & Dunn celebrate their 25th anniversary as a duo.
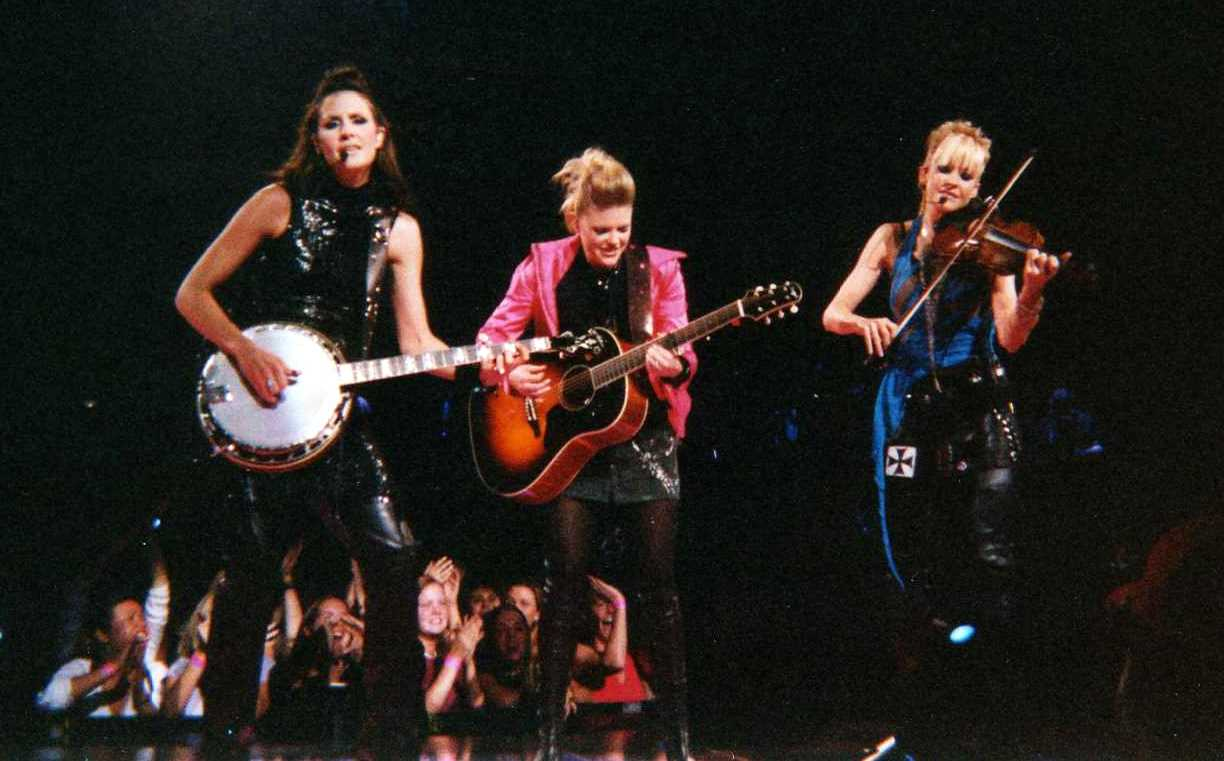
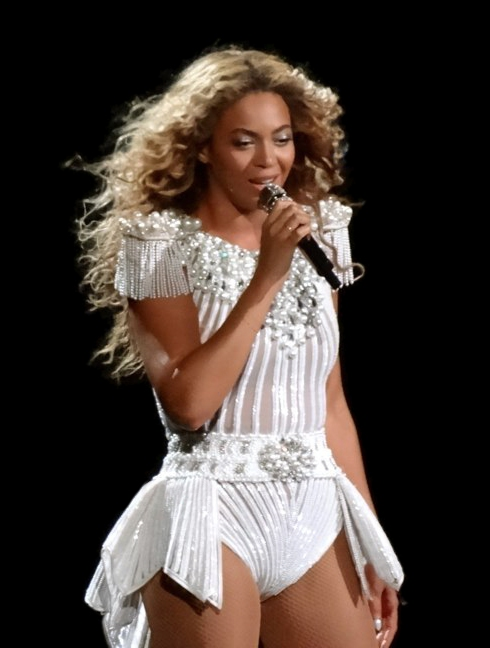
The performance by Dixie Chicks and Beyoncé received a mixed reception.
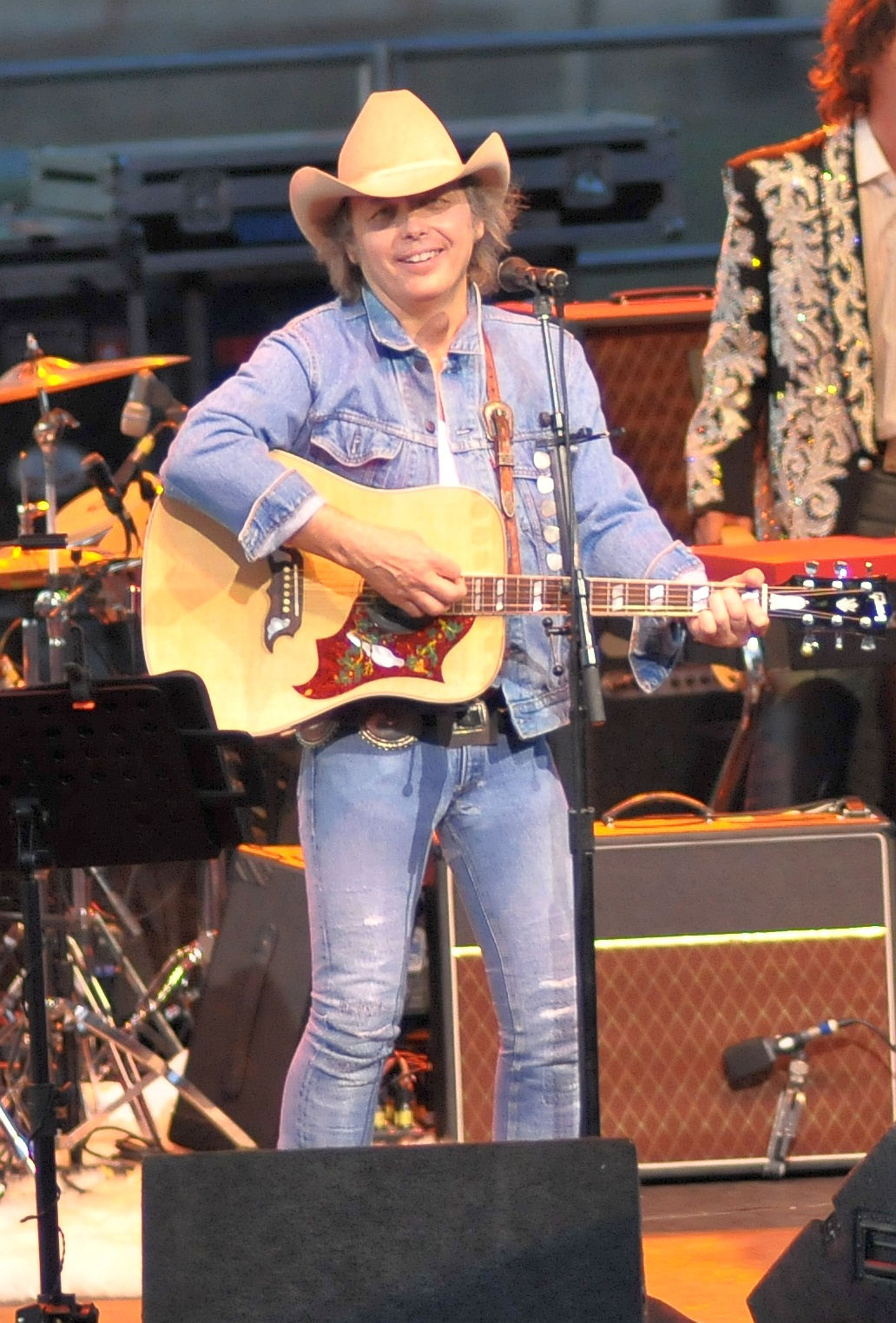
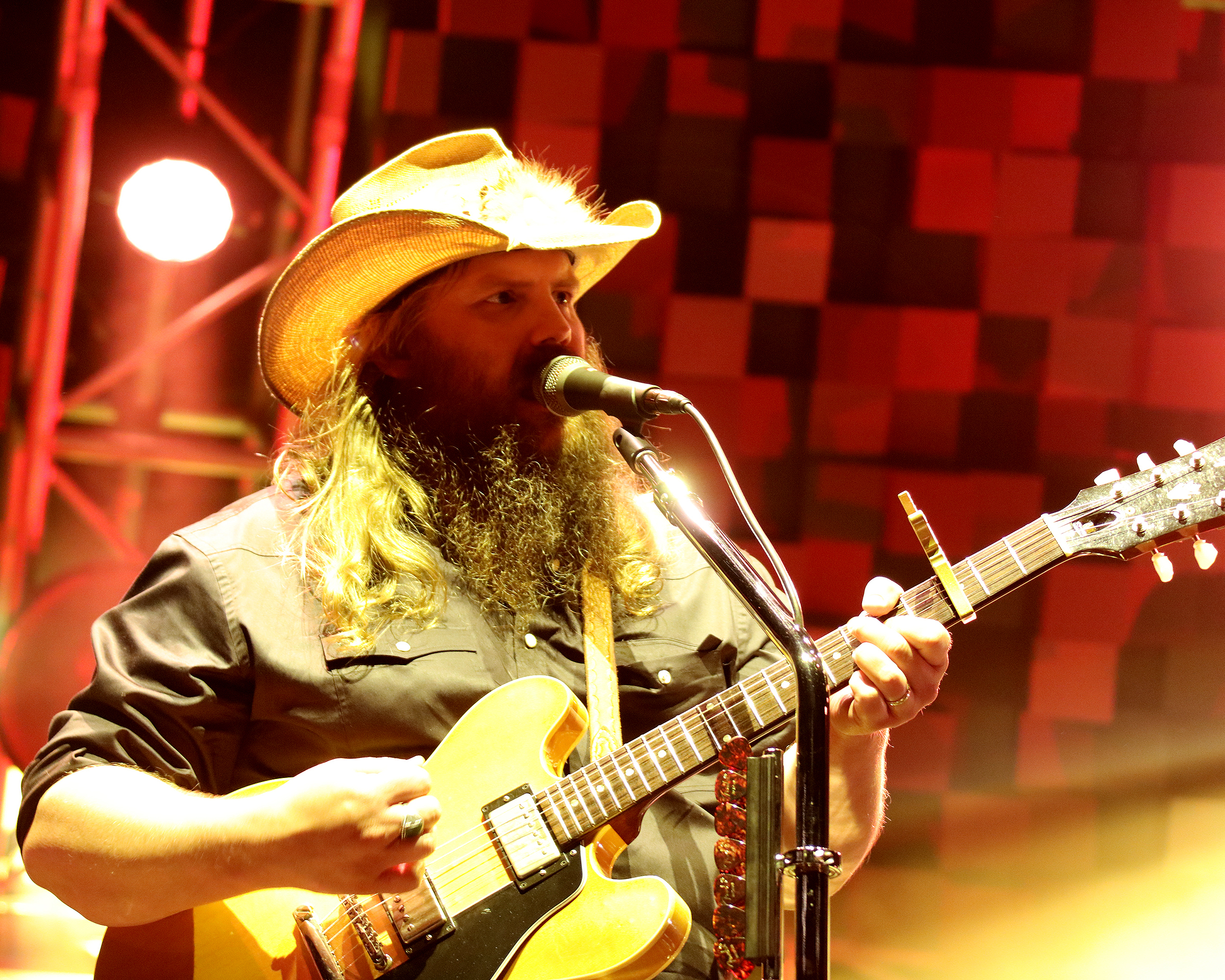
Dwight Yoakam and Chris Stapleton honoured Ray Charles and Willie Nelson.
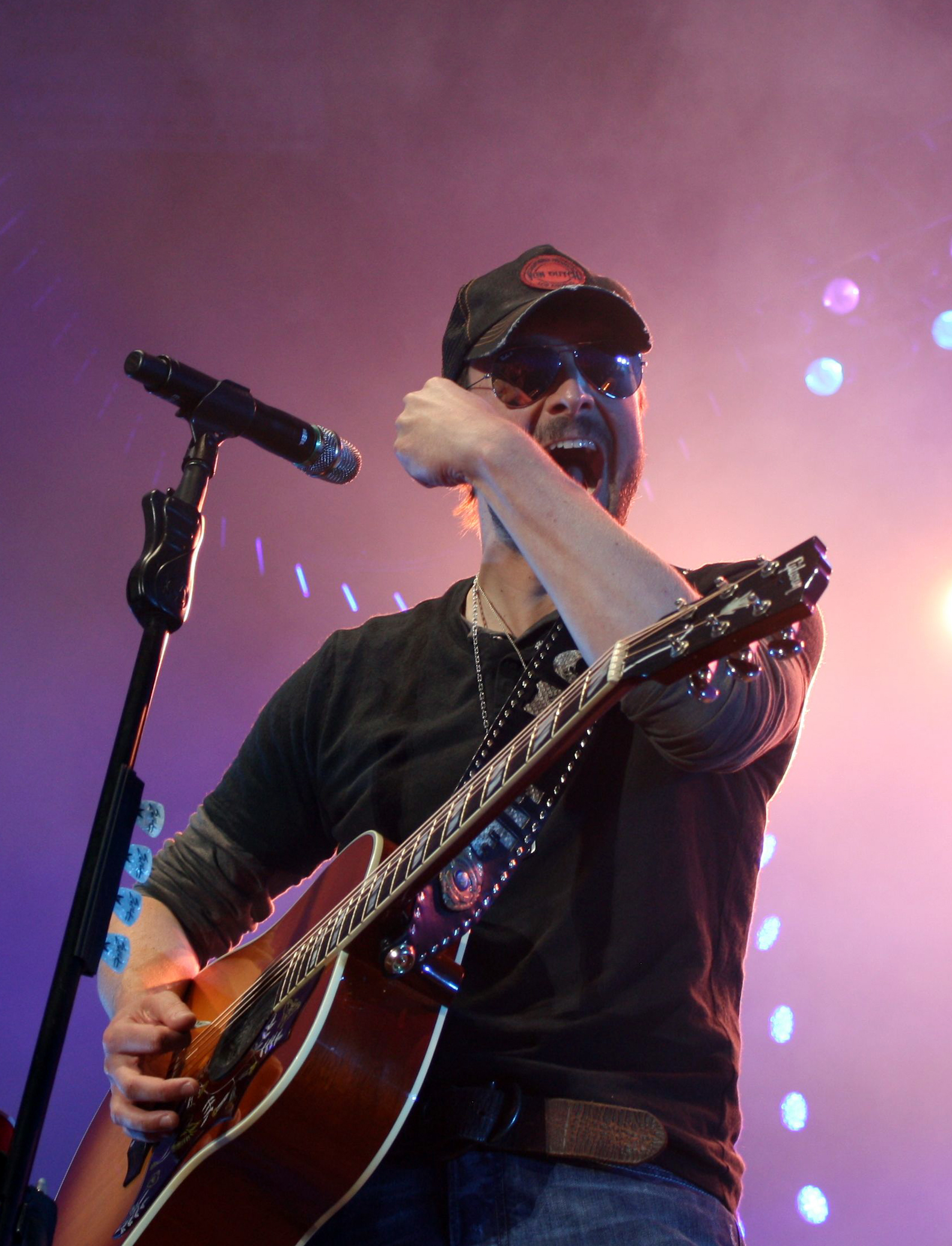
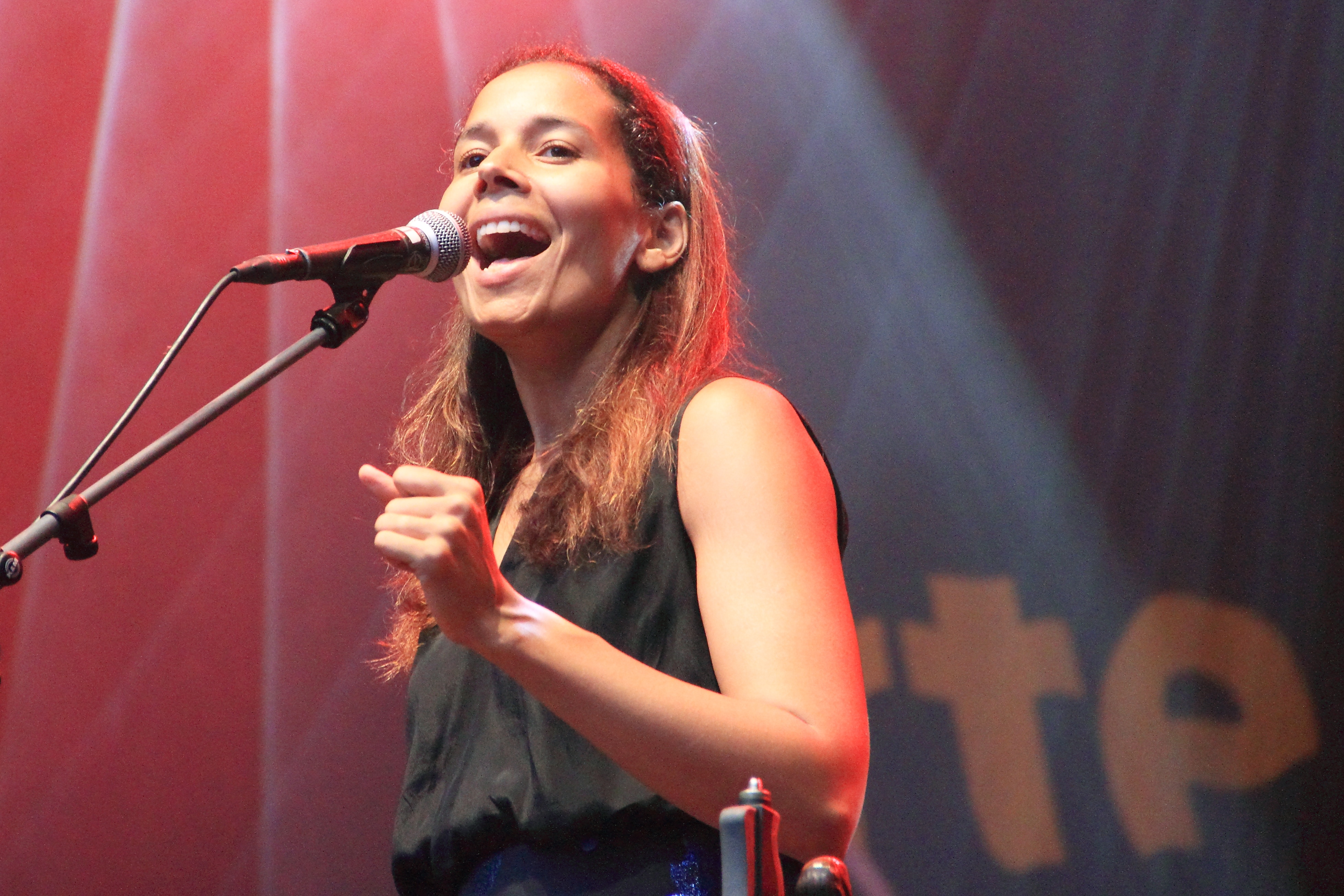
Eric Church collaborated with folk singer Rhiannon Giddens.

Performer(s)	Song(s)
^{[A]}Vince Gill with Ben Haggard; Brad Paisley and Roy Clark; Carrie Underwood; Charley Pride (with Brad Paisley); Alabama; Charlie Daniels; Reba McEntire; Dwight Yoakam; Clint Black; Ricky Skaggs; Alan Jackson; Randy Travis (with ensemble)	"Mama Tried" "I've Got a Tiger By the Tail" "Stand by Your Man" "Kiss an Angel Good Mornin'" "Mountain Music" "Devil Went Down to Georgia" "Fancy" "Guitars, Cadillacs" "Killin' Time" "Country Boy" "Don't Rock the Jukebox" "Forever and Ever, Amen"
Kelsea Ballerini	"Peter Pan"
Brooks & Dunn; Jason Aldean	"Brand New Man"
Dierks Bentley; Elle King	"Different for Girls"
Maren Morris with The McCrary Sisters	"My Church"
Garth Brooks; Trisha Yearwood	"Jackson" "Chug-a-Lug" "Don't It Make My Brown Eyes Blue" "Louisiana Woman, Mississippi Man" "Rose Garden" "Don't Close Your Eyes" "Golden Ring"
Carrie Underwood	"Dirty Laundry"
Little Big Town	"Better Man"
Miranda Lambert	"Vice"
Tim McGraw	"Humble and Kind"
Alan Jackson; George Strait	"Remember When"^{[B]} "Troubadour"
Keith Urban	"Blue Ain't Your Color"
Dixie Chicks; Beyoncé	"Daddy Lessons"
Thomas Rhett	"Die a Happy Man"
Chris Stapleton; Dwight Yoakam	"Seven Spanish Angels"
Luke Bryan	"Move"
Florida Georgia Line; Tim McGraw	"May We All"
Eric Church; Rhiannon Giddens	"Kill a Word"
Pentatonix; Jennifer Nettles; Reba McEntire; Kacey Musgraves; Carrie Underwood; Martina McBride	Willie Nelson Lifetime Achievement Award honoring Dolly Parton "Jolene" "9 to 5" "Here You Come Again" "I Will Always Love You"
Brad Paisley	"Today"

A. Leading into the opening number, footage was played from past CMA ceremonies. Those featured were: Minnie Pearl, Dolly Parton, Willie Nelson, Reba McEntire, Deana Carter, Carrie Underwood, Vince Gill, Rascal Flatts, Darius Rucker, Ricky Skaggs, George Strait, Miranda Lambert, Loretta Lynn, Little Big Town, Garth Brooks, Taylor Swift, Lee Ann Womack and Merle Haggard.
B. During Jackson and Strait's performance, pictures of many deceased country artists were shown on the screen behind and archive footage was played of past CMA Awards speeches in-between the two songs. Those featured were: Tammy Wynette, Johnny Cash, Sonny James and George Jones.

== Presenters ==
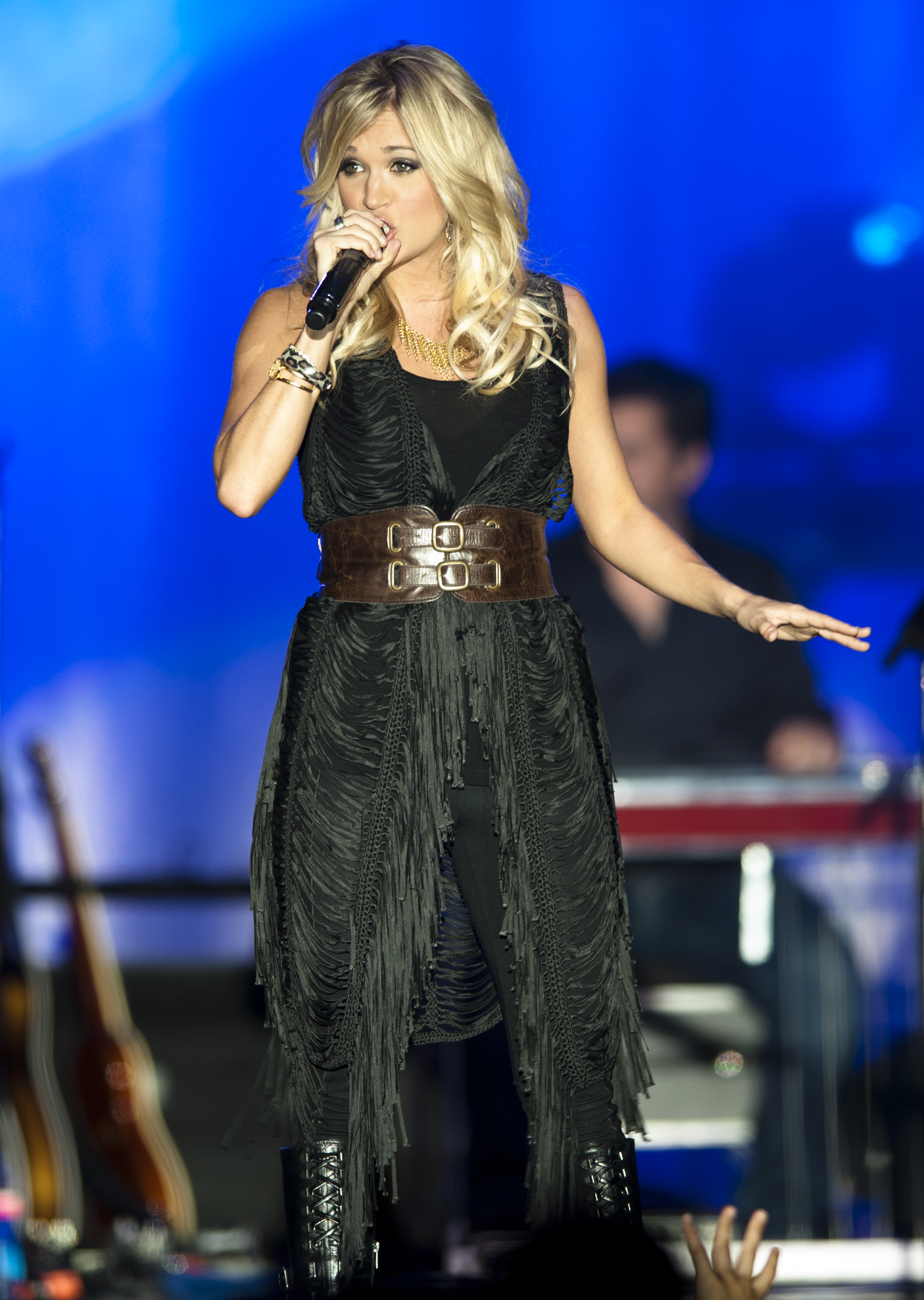
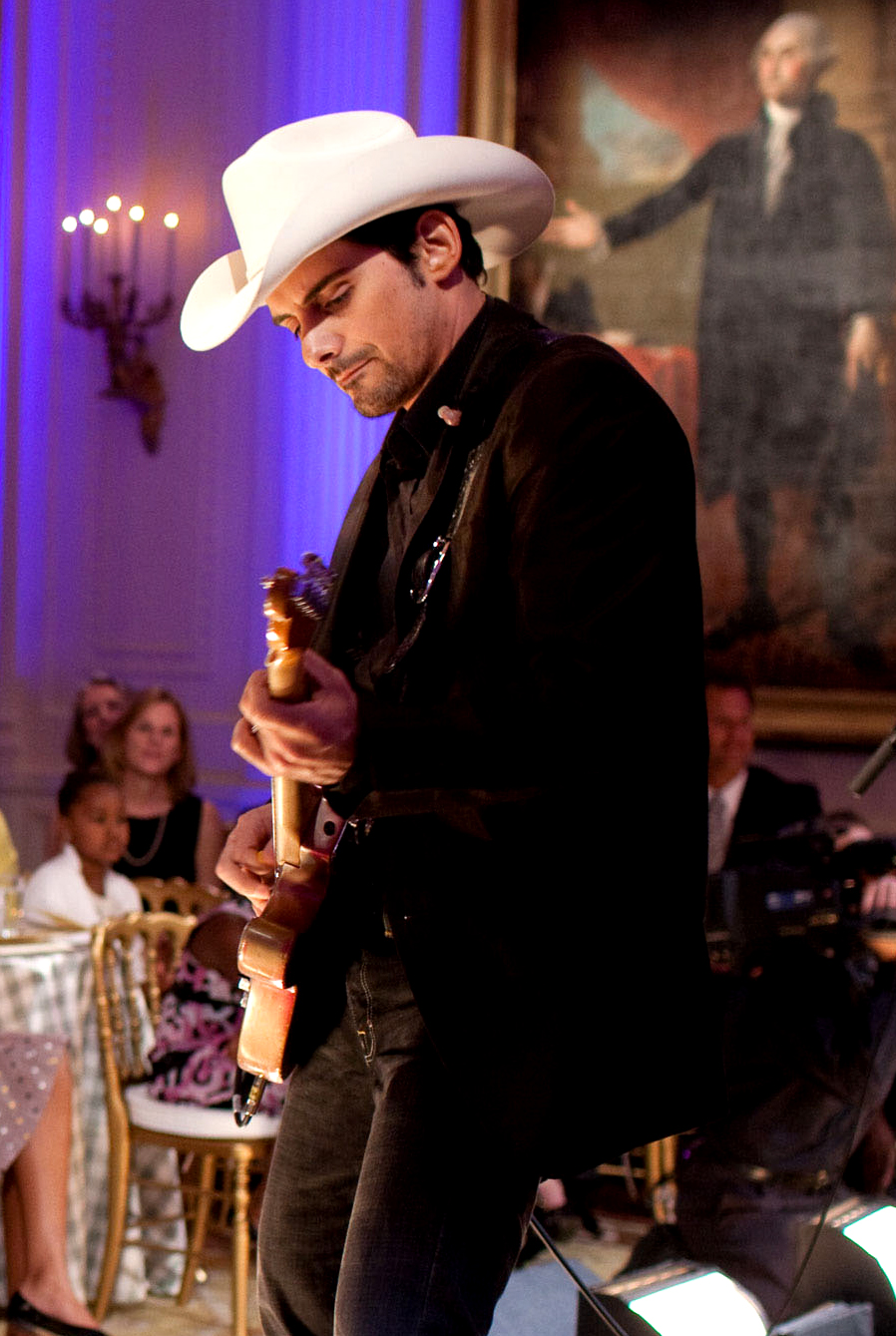
Carrie Underwood and Brad Paisley co-hosted the ceremony for the ninth time.

Presenter(s)	Award
Simone Biles, Gabby Douglas, Laurie Hernandez, Madison Kocian and Aly Raisman	Single of the Year
Olivia Newton-John, Wendi McLendon-Covey and Hayley Orrantia	Song of the Year
Jennifer Garner	New Artist of the Year
Faith Hill	Album of the Year
Samantha Ponder and Kirk Herbstreit	Vocal Duo of the Year
Josh Dallas, Cam and Cole Swindell	Vocal Group of the Year
Vince Gill	Female Vocalist of the Year
Sharon Stone	Male Vocalist of the Year
Taylor Swift	Entertainer of the Year

- Barbara Mandrell - introduced Garth Brooks and Trisha Yearwood.
- Bill Anderson - introduced Carrie Underwood
- Matthew McConaughey - introduced Tim McGraw
- Oak Ridge Boys - sang Elvira (transition to commercials)
- Peyton Manning - presented the "Pinnacle Award" to Kenny Chesney
- Lily Tomlin - presented the Willie Nelson Lifetime Achievement Award to Dolly Parton

== Controversy ==
The 50th CMA Awards attracted a large amount of media attention for both the return of the Dixie Chicks to the CMA stage following their controversial statements about George Bush which saw them shut out of the country music industry as well as the appearance of Beyoncé. Their performance of "Daddy Lessons" from Beyoncé's Lemonade album polarised viewers, artists and critics alike, with some praising the collaboration and others denouncing the performance, stating that Beyoncé, largely recognized as a pop/R&B artist, had no place at a country music awards show. Many saw the criticisms as retaliation to an outspoken woman of color standing alongside three equally strong independent women on the stage of an award show notorious for its conservative attitudes and lack of diversity, with several reviewers noting that many of the negative comments surrounding Beyoncé's inclusion at the ceremony as hateful and racist, pointing to the fact that there was not backlash on such a scale when Meghan Trainor performed with Miranda Lambert, Ariana Grande performed with Little Big Town or when Justin Timberlake performed with Chris Stapleton at previous CMA ceremonies, with several in fact referring to the latter as one of the best CMA performances of all time. Scholarly attention given to the performance has described it as representing "genre surveillance" in country music broadly, as well as a type of musical Black Lives Matter protest. Many also took issue with Beyoncé being allegedly "anti-police" and branded the Dixie Chicks as "anti-American".

Following the immediate, potent and unexpected backlash of some viewers, the CMA reportedly removed all mention of the performance from its social media website but later issued a statement explaining that "CMA has not erased any mentions of Beyoncé's performance. In advance of the broadcast, CMA removed a five-second clip from ABC.com and CMA's Facebook page. The promo was unapproved and CMA removed it prior to broadcast. Beyoncé's performance with the Dixie Chicks was a highlight of the evening and we are continuing to share the amazing full-length performance clip via our official social channels".

Immediately following the performance, Dixie Chick's lead singer Natalie Maines had enthusiastically shared a photograph of the quartet, declaring it as "one of the best weeks of [her] life", thanking Beyoncé and humorously mentioning how she had once swore she would never play on the CMA stage again. In response to the controversy, Maines joked that "the CMA's called and asked us to co-host next year's show with Beyoncé. Unfortunately, I've got a thing that night so no" before following with a quotation from Beyoncé's song "Formation". She went on to say that she had "used" the CMA's in order to fulfil her dream to perform with Beyoncé "on their dime".

Several country stars declared their support for Beyoncé, including Dierks Bentley who said that "Daddy Lessons" is undoubtedly a country song: "it's not just choruses and verses that could be intermixed anywhere as some pop songs are, it's a real story that she tells about what's going on in her life growing up". Karen Fairchild of Little Big Town echoed this, explaining "she's got some stories to tell - that's what makes country music great".

Rhiannon Giddens (who performed earlier in the night alongside Eric Church) stated via a Facebook post that "there were two other people of color at the CMA Awards who were singing country music, Charley Pride and myself. Company I'm honoured to be in. Not to mention The McCrary Sisters who rocked as usual". The post also included a link to her performance with Church and the words "no it's not Beyoncé and the Dixie Chicks, it was a little quieter but it was really saying something important to me". Responding to a comment who questioned whether she had discounted the "Daddy Lessons" performance as something that was not country music, Giddens added that "she doesn't make the genres" and that she was "just suggesting that there are other ways of making a statement" as the Beyoncé/Chicks performance has received "plenty of ink". Giddens would later collaborate with Beyoncé as an instrumentalist on the song "Texas Hold 'Em", which appears on the latter's eighth studio album Cowboy Carter.

== Promotion ==
Whilst promoting the ceremony, advertisements played upon the frequent tagline for the CMA Awards ("country's biggest night"), instead referring to it as "country music's biggest night ever". They accompanied this with three mash up videos featuring popular contemporary artists singing a duet of two classic country songs (Brad Paisley and Carrie Underwood performing I Will Always Love You/Country Roads Take Me Home, Keith Urban and Miranda Lambert performing Crazy/Always on My Mind and Luke Bryan with Little Big Town performing Mountain Music/On the Road Again) with each concluding with the "then, now, forever country" tagline. Newer artists Scotty McCreery and Dustin Lynch also did videos of their own, with McCreery doing a cover of Jamey Johnson's "In Color" and Lynch doing Garth Brooks' "Friends In Low Places".

=== Forever Country ===
In order to celebrate the 50th anniversary of the awards, the CMA tasked Shane McAnally to produce and compose a special single featuring country stars from the past and present. Joseph Khan was chosen to direct what was described as "the biggest music video in country music history". Whilst initially conceived as a single track, Khan had the idea of a mash-up as three songs would cover more of the breadth of country music than a single track. In order to narrow down the options, only CMA song of the year winners were considered, with On the Road Again, Country Roads Take Me Home and I Will Always Love You being chosen. Similarly, only artists who were previous CMA award winners were approached to participate. 29 artists sing on the track with 30 appearing in the music video however, as it was initially unknown how many artists would be able to take part, several of those who agreed early in the development process sang large amounts of all three tracks. The majority of the recording and filming took place in July to coincide with the CMA Music Festival.

Upon its release, Forever Country debuted at number 1 on the Billboard Hot Country chart, becoming only the third song in history to do so. In a rare display, the rival Academy of Country Music Awards bestowed the Video of the Year Award to the CMA and Forever Country.

Artists Featured: Brad Paisley, Keith Urban, Tim McGraw, Faith Hill, Little Big Town, Luke Bryan, Miranda Lambert, Randy Travis, Blake Shelton, George Strait, Kacey Musgraves, Charley Pride, Ronnie Milsap, Eric Church, Dierks Bentley, Trisha Yearwood, Lady Antebellum, Darius Rucker, Jason Aldean, Rascal Flatts, Willie Nelson, Brooks & Dunn, Alabama, Brett Eldredge, Reba McEntire, Alan Jackson, Vince Gill, Carrie Underwood, Martina McBride and Dolly Parton.

Covers Series
Alongside Forever Country, the CMA also promoted a "Forever Country Covers Series" which featured artists from around the world performing their favourite songs by CMA winning artists. All in all, 42 artists took part:

- "Lucille" - Shane Nicholson
- "I Don't Need Your Rockin' Chair" - T. Graham Brown
- "Back Home Again" - John Berry
- "Forever and Ever, Amen" - Una Healy, Jon Pardi
- "This Kiss" - Melanie Dyer, Tegan Marie
- "Whiskey Lullaby" - Catherine Britt
- "Check Yes or No" - Kane Brown
- "Sunday Mornin' Comin' Down" - Collin Raye, Michael Ray
- "Help Me Make It Through the Night" - Chris Janson, Lorrie Morgan
- "The Carroll County Accident" - Aaron Tippin
- "Strawberry Wine" - Lindsay Ell
- "In Color" - Scotty McCreery
- "Behind Closed Doors" - Steve Wariner
- "There Goes My Everything" - Ricky Skaggs, Shanendoah
- "Rhinestone Cowboy" - George Canyon
- "I Hope You Dance" - Clare Dunn
- "Always on My Mind" - Eric Paslay, Lucie Silvas, Johnny Reid
- "Go Rest High on That Mountain" - The Wilkinsons
- "Chiseled in Stone" - Lee Ann Womack
- "Girl Crush" - Jill Johnson, Jess Moskaluke
- "A Boy Named Sue" - Mark Collie
- "When I Call Your Name" - The Common Linnets, David Nail
- "Look at Us" - Deana Carter
- "I Drive Your Truck" - Chad Brownlee
- "The House That Built Me" - Brett Kissel
- "The Gambler" - Tim Hicks, Mark Wills
- "When You Say Nothing at All" - William Michael Morgan
- "Independence Day" - Carolyn Dawn Johnson
- "Three Wooden Crosses" - Josh Turner
- "Please Remember Me" - Canaan Smith
- "He Stopped Loving Her Today" - Billy Ray Cyrus
- "Good Hearted Woman" - Drake White
- "Friends in Low Places" - Dustin Lynch
- "Believe" - Lauren Alaina
