= Round Here Buzz =

Single by Eric Church

from the album Mr. Misunderstood
- Released: April 10, 2017
- Recorded: 2015
- Genre: Country
- Length: 3:35
- Label: EMI Nashville
- Songwriters: Eric Church; Luke Dick; Jeff Hyde
- Producer: Jay Joyce

Eric Church singles chronology
"Kill a Word" (2016)	"Round Here Buzz" (2017)	"Desperate Man" (2018)

"Round Here Buzz" is a song co-written and recorded by American country music artist Eric Church. It was released in April 2017 as the fourth single from his 2015 album Mr. Misunderstood. Church wrote this song with Luke Dick and Jeff Hyde. The song went Platinum as of December 6, 2018.

== Content ==
The song is a male narrator who is "stuck in his hometown as his ex goes off to chase her dreams". Church said that co-writer Luke Dick was "nervous" because the song had already been partially written, and was subject to "tweaking" from Church when Church presented the other two writers with the idea that he had.

== Critical reception ==
Kevin John Coyne of Country Universe reviewed the song with favor, giving it an "A" grade and writing that it "has the familiar elements of high school bleachers and dingy bars with cheap drinks, but the images are neither glorified nor criticized. They’re just there, their presence forming the detailed backdrop of the melancholy experience he’s working through as he misses the girl who had dreams too big for the little town" and that the song "grows in its power upon repeated listens, and is every bit the peer of Mr. Misunderstood‘s acclaimed title track and that set’s one big hit to date, “Record Year.”"

== Commercial performance ==
The song has sold 216,000 copies in the United States as of February 2018. It was certified Platinum by the RIAA on December 6, 2018 for a million units in sales and streams.

== Music video ==
The music video centers around the male narrator, with Christian Sancho (the bassist in Ashley McBryde's band Deadhorse) starring.

== Chart performance ==
=== Weekly charts ===
Chart (2017–2018)	Peak position
Canada Country (Billboard)	8
US Billboard Hot 100	56
US Country Airplay (Billboard)	2
US Hot Country Songs (Billboard)	7

=== Year-end charts ===
Chart (2017)	Position
Canada Country (Billboard)	34
US Country Airplay (Billboard)	53
US Hot Country Songs (Billboard)	46

Chart (2018)	Position
US Country Airplay (Billboard)	41
US Hot Country Songs (Billboard)	63

== Certifications ==
Region	Certification	Certified units/sales
United States (RIAA)	2× Platinum	2,000,000^{‡}
^{‡} Sales+streaming figures based on certification alone.
