= Some of It =

Single by Eric Church

from the album Desperate Man
- Released: January 14, 2019
- Genre: Country
- Length: 3:15
- Label: EMI Nashville
- Songwriters: Eric Church; Jeff Hyde; Clint Daniels; Bobby Pinson
- Producer: Jay Joyce

Eric Church singles chronology
"Desperate Man" (2018)	"Some of It" (2019)	"Monsters" (2019)

"Some of It" is a song co-written and recorded by American country music singer Eric Church. It is the second single from Church's sixth studio album Desperate Man. Church wrote the song with Jeff Hyde, Clint Daniels, and Bobby Pinson.

== Content and history ==
Taste of Country writers Billy Dukes and Cillea Houghton described the song as a "mid-tempo thinker" that "takes on a quieter tone as a somber Church thinks back on how he has learned lessons throughout his life." Robert K. Oermann, writing for MusicRow, described the song as "Life lessons delivered with eloquence and expression. Craftsmanship and heart in every note, from the lyric to the brain-tickling production touches."

== Commercial performance ==
"Some of It" became Eric Church's eighth number one on the Billboard Country Airplay chart, for the week dated July 27, 2019, and his first since “Record Year” in August 2016. The song took 29 weeks to reach the top, marking this Church's longest climb to number one. The song was certified Platinum by the RIAA on June 3, 2021, for a million units in sales and streams. It has sold 130,000 copies in the United States as of December 2019.

== Music video ==
The song's accompanying music video depicts Church performing the song in prison, through a disassembled guitar smuggled into the prison by his daughter. The storyline continues from the video of the preceding single "Desperate Man", which featured Church and his band stealing the album from his record company. Reid Long directed the video.

== Charts ==
=== Weekly charts ===
Chart (2019)	Peak position
Canada Hot 100 (Billboard)	77
Canada Country (Billboard)	3
US Billboard Hot 100	43
US Country Airplay (Billboard)	1
US Hot Country Songs (Billboard)	8

=== Year-end charts ===
Chart (2019)	Position
US Country Airplay (Billboard)	25
US Hot Country Songs (Billboard)	37

== Certifications ==
Region	Certification	Certified units/sales
United States (RIAA)	Platinum	1,000,000^{‡}
^{‡} Sales+streaming figures based on certification alone.
