= Desperate Man (song) =

Single by Eric Church

from the album Desperate Man
- Released: July 12, 2018
- Genre: Country
- Length: 3:29
- Label: EMI Nashville
- Songwriter(s): Eric Church; Ray Wylie Hubbard
- Producer(s): Jay Joyce

Eric Church singles chronology
"Round Here Buzz" (2017)	"Desperate Man" (2018)	"Some of It" (2019)

"Desperate Man" is a song recorded by American country music singer Eric Church. Written by Church and Ray Wylie Hubbard, the song is the title track and lead single from his sixth studio album of the same name.

== Content ==
Church announced the single and album via a livestream with his fan club, the Church Choir, in July 2018.

The song has been compared to "Sympathy for the Devil" by The Rolling Stones. Church said that he chose to write with Ray Wylie Hubbard after name-dropping him in his 2015 single "Mr. Misunderstood". This led to the two performing together in concert, and Church collaborating on a song of Hubbard's. Church presented the opening line, about a fortune teller who tells a man that he "has no future", from which Hubbard developed more lyrics and the song's groove. Hubbard told Taste of Country that the song is about being "completely at a point where you're willing to try anything." Church also noted that much of the song's emotion, along with its message of showing hope even when one is feeling troubled, were inspired by the 2017 Las Vegas shooting.

In the music video, which also features Hubbard in a cameo, Church gets "busted" by FBI agents whose uniforms read EMI, the name of his record label.

== Commercial performance ==
The song peaked at No 8 on Hot Country Songs for chart dated October 18, 2018. The song has sold 109,000 copies in the United States as of December 2018. It was certified Gold in Canada and Platinum in the US.

== Charts ==
=== Weekly charts ===
Chart (2018)	Peak position
Canada (Canadian Hot 100)	61
US Billboard Hot 100	68
US Country Airplay (Billboard)	13
US Hot Country Songs (Billboard)	8

=== Year-end charts ===
Chart (2018)	Position
US Country Airplay (Billboard)	54
US Hot Country Songs (Billboard)	52

== Certifications ==
Region	Certification	Certified units/sales
Canada (Music Canada)	Gold	40,000^{‡}
United States (RIAA)	Platinum	1,000,000^{‡}
^{‡} Sales+streaming figures based on certification alone.
