= Monsters (Eric Church song) =

2019 single by Eric Church

Single by Eric Church

from the album Desperate Man
- Released: August 26, 2019
- Genre: Country
- Length: 3:20
- Label: EMI Nashville
- Songwriter(s): Eric Church; Jeff Hyde
- Producer(s): Jay Joyce

Eric Church singles chronology
"Some of It" (2019)	"Monsters" (2019)	"Does to Me" (2020)

"Monsters" is a song recorded by American country music singer Eric Church, who co-wrote the song with Jeff Hyde. It is the third single from Church's sixth studio album Desperate Man.

== Content and history ==
The song uses the analogy of a monster hiding under a child's bed to represent troubles in one's life. Taste of Country writer Sterling Whitaker wrote that "Church sings over simple acoustic guitar chords to open the track. But as the song progresses, he admits that he's turned to prayer to face his all-too-real challenges as an adult." According to Church, the idea for the song came when he was confronted by his then seven-year-old son Boone, who asked him to turn on a light to keep away "monsters". Church said that the song took on "more meaning" to him following the 2017 Las Vegas shooting.

== Chart performance ==
"Monsters" peaked at #15 on Billboard's Country Airplay chart. It became Church's first single to fail to chart on the Billboard Hot 100 since "His Kind of Money (My Kind of Love)" in 2008.

== Charts ==
=== Weekly charts ===
Chart (2019–2020)	Peak position
Canada Country (Billboard)	11
US Bubbling Under Hot 100 Singles (Billboard)	2
US Country Airplay (Billboard)	15
US Hot Country Songs (Billboard)	20

=== Year-end charts ===
Chart (2020)	Position
US Country Airplay (Billboard)	57
US Hot Country Songs (Billboard)	62

== Certifications ==
Region	Certification	Certified units/sales
United States (RIAA)	Gold	500,000^{‡}
^{‡} Sales+streaming figures based on certification alone.
