= Desperate Man (album) =

Studio album by Eric Church
- Released: October 5, 2018
- Studio: Neon Cross (Nashville)
- Genre: Outlaw country
- Length: 36:41
- Label: EMI Nashville
- Producer: Jay Joyce

Eric Church chronology
Mr. Misunderstood (2015)	Desperate Man (2018)	Heart & Soul (2021)

Singles from Desperate Man
- 1. "Desperate Man" Released: July 12, 2018; 2. "Some of It" Released: January 14, 2019; 3. "Monsters" Released: August 26, 2019

Desperate Man is the sixth album by American country music singer Eric Church. It was released via EMI Nashville on October 5, 2018. Following the success of 2015's Mr. Misunderstood, Church reteamed with long-time producer Jay Joyce to work on new material for his next country album. The album garnered positive reviews from music critics. Desperate Man debuted at number one on the Billboard Top Country Albums chart and number five on the Billboard 200, spawning three singles: the title track, "Some of It" and "Monsters". It was certified gold in the United States by the Recording Industry Association of America (RIAA).

== History ==
Church announced the album's release on July 13, 2018, via a livestream to his fanclub, the Church Choir. The lead single, which is the title track, was shipped to radio a day prior to this announcement. The album consists of 11 songs, and Church revealed the tracklisting on a pre-order page on his website. As with all of his previous albums, it was produced by Jay Joyce. Church said that the album's title came from the emotions he felt after the 2017 Las Vegas shooting; he told Rolling Stone that "I got a little bit desperate in there to just find an album, because it was not fucking happening."

== Critical reception ==
Professional ratings
Aggregate scores
Source	Rating
Metacritic	80/100
Review scores
Source	Rating
AllMusic	4/5 stars
Pitchfork	7.6/10
Rolling Stone	3.5/5 stars

Desperate Man received positive reviews from music critics. At Metacritic, which assigns a normalized rating out of 100 to reviews from mainstream publications, the album received an average score of 80, based on 8 reviews.

Stephen Thomas Erlewine of AllMusic rated it 4 out of 5 stars, stating that "Instead of going big, the way he did on 2014's burly Outsiders, he's keeping things small, a decision that highlights the many savvy ways he expands American musical traditions even as he adheres to them. Perhaps these variations on themes are subtle, but this confident sense of sonic adventure -- when combined with Church's expert craft -- results in a satisfying album." Erlewine also reviewed the album for Pitchfork, where he called it one of the "most modest but poignant albums" of Church's career and "the sound of a renegade settling into his mature period". Erlewine also noted that the "deliberate decision not to indulge in a grand gesture—combined with the consciously compact scale of Desperate Man—means this album seems smaller than every record he's made since 2011's Chief. That modesty is the key to its very appeal: This is an album designed not for the moment but the long haul." Vulture reviewer Craig Jenkins wrote that Church "excellence out of ordinary threads", while highlighting it as Church's "quietest" record to date and praising many of the songs' lyrics.

Meet-Country.com stated "His current sound is a natural progression from his previous works but yet it all still ties together."

Desperate Man received a nomination for Album of the Year at the 53rd Country Music Association Awards, ultimately losing to Girl (2019) by Maren Morris.

== Commercial performance ==
Desperate Man debuted at number five on the Billboard 200, with 103,000 copies sold (116,000 in equivalent album units). It is Church's fifth top ten entry in the chart. It also debuted atop the Top Country Albums chart. On the Billboard 200, the album left the top 100 on the week of November 24, 2018, and has spent 22 weeks on the chart. It has sold 245,100 copies in the United States as of March 2020. Desperate Man was certified gold by the RIAA in the US on August 3, 2020. In Canada, the album debuted and peaked at number five on the Canadian Albums chart for the week of October 20, 2018. Desperate Man was certified gold by Music Canada in Canada on March 26, 2021.

== Track listing ==
All tracks are written by Eric Church, with additional co-writers as noted.

No.	Title	Writer(s)	Length
1.	"The Snake"	Jeremy Spillman; Travis Meadows	4:00
2.	"Hangin' Around"	Jeff Hyde	2:29
3.	"Heart Like a Wheel"		3:15
4.	"Some of It"	Hyde; Clint Daniels; Bobby Pinson	3:15
5.	"Monsters"	Hyde	3:20
6.	"Hippie Radio"		2:54
7.	"Higher Wire"	Casey Beathard; Scooter Carusoe	2:43
8.	"Desperate Man"	Ray Wylie Hubbard	3:28
9.	"Solid"	Anders Osborne	4:18
10.	"Jukebox and a Bar"		3:12
11.	"Drowning Man"	Beathard	3:47
Total length:			36:41

== Personnel ==
Credits adapted from the Desperate Man liner notes.

Musicians

- Jeff Cease – electric guitar, handclapping
- Eric Church – acoustic guitar, electric guitar, lead vocals, background vocals
- Joanna Cotten – handclapping, background vocals
- Lee Hendricks – bass guitar, handclapping
- Jeff Hyde – banjo, acoustic guitar, handclapping, background vocals
- Jay Joyce – acoustic guitar, bass guitar, electric guitar, Hammond B-3 organ, handclapping, keyboards, percussion, piano, programming, background vocals
- Driver Williams – electric guitar
- Craig Wright – bongos, drums, handclapping, percussion, shaker

Production

- Jay Joyce – producer, mixing (Neon Cross)
- Jason Hall – mixing (Neon Cross)
- Jimmy Mansfield – assistant engineering
- Jaxon Hargrove – assistant engineering
- Andrew Mendelson – mastering (Georgetown Masters)
- Melissa Spillman – production coordination

Imagery

- John Peets – art direction and photography
- Karen Naff – design

== Charts ==
=== Weekly charts ===
Chart (2018)	Peak position
Australian Albums (ARIA)	63
Canadian Albums (Billboard)	5
Scottish Albums (OCC)	34
Swiss Albums (Schweizer Hitparade)	93
US Billboard 200	5
US Top Country Albums (Billboard)	1

=== Year-end charts ===
Chart (2018)	Position
US Top Country Albums (Billboard)	40
Chart (2019)	Position
US Top Country Albums (Billboard)	22

== Certifications ==
Region	Certification	Certified units/sales
Canada (Music Canada)	Gold	40,000^{‡}
United States (RIAA)	Gold	500,000^{‡}
^{‡} Sales+streaming figures based on certification alone.
