= Mr. Misunderstood =

Studio album by Eric Church
- Released: November 3, 2015
- Recorded: September–October 2015
- Studio: St. Charles Studios Nashville, Tennessee
- Genres: Country; rock; country rock; blues; soul; Southern rock
- Length: 38:41
- Label: EMI Nashville
- Producer: Jay Joyce

Eric Church chronology
The Outsiders (2014)	Mr. Misunderstood (2015)	Desperate Man (2018)

Singles from Mr. Misunderstood
- 1. "Mr. Misunderstood" Released: November 9, 2015; 2. "Record Year" Released: February 16, 2016; 3. "Kill a Word" Released: August 29, 2016; 4. "Round Here Buzz" Released: April 10, 2017

Mr. Misunderstood is the fifth studio album from American country music artist Eric Church. EMI Records Nashville released the album on November 3, 2015, to his fan club, before being released on iTunes the following day. Church worked with long-time music producer Jay Joyce for the production of the album.

== Background ==
Church started his songwriting of the album on his guitar, nicknamed "Butter Bean" by his son, in the latter part of the summer. Originally, he set out to create a collaboration album with other country artists about their journey in music:

“Initially, it was going to be a collaboration album. I had contacted Willie, I’d contacted Kris Kristofferson, I’d contacted Bob Seger, Billy Joel and all these people. And I said, ‘Hey, I want to do this album where we get together and we make an album about what we all share, which is this journey in music.'”

Within just twenty days, he had twenty songs written for the album, when he went into the studio, where twenty days later after some recording sessions, the ten tracks that comprise this album were finished. The recording sessions for this album took place in mid-to-late-September to early-October 2015. Church got Jay Joyce to produce the album, while his label EMI Records Nashville was the imprint used. This album was produced at St. Charles Studios in Nashville, Tennessee. The song, "Mixed Drinks about Feelings", featured blues and blue-eyed soul performer, Susan Tedeschi. Its song, "Chattanooga Lucy", featured country artist, Joanna Cotten, while the song, "Kill a Word", has two singers featured, in Kentuckian, Andrea Davidson, and Americana singer, Rhiannon Giddens. Church put on the cover, McKinley James "Mickey" Smay, who is a 14-year old in the ninth grade at a high school located in Rochester, New York, where he also makes an appearance on the music video for this song, while his father is a rock music drummer, Jason Smay.

== Release and promotion ==
This album was released to his fan club members, known as The Church Choir, where it is a paid membership, on November 3, 2015, via email, and some select fans and radio-stations got copies of the album on compact disc and vinyl. His music club fans posted snippets of the songs on YouTube, where they were quickly removed for copyright infringement. It came out on Apple Inc.'s iTunes, the subsequent day, where it was distributed exclusively through them. Church performed, "Mr. Misunderstood", at the 2015 Country Music Association Awards, where the news of the new album became evident.

== Music and lyrics ==
The musical style of this album has been described as the following; country, rock, blues, folk, gospel, soul, funk, pop, alternative country, alternative rock, country rock, country blues, country gospel, gospel blues, bluegrass, folk rock, roots rock, rock and roll, rhythm and blues, Southern gospel, Southern rock, and Southern soul. His music here has been compared to the likes of The Allman Brothers Band, John Mellencamp, The Marshall Tucker Band, Stevie Wonder, Fleetwood Mac, and Wilco's Jeff Tweedy. Stephen Thomas Erlewine believes, "where other country is provincial, Church embraces the world without repudiating his home."

== Critical reception ==
Professional ratings
Aggregate scores
Source	Rating
Metacritic	84/100
Review scores
Source	Rating
AllMusic	5/5 stars
AbsolutePunk	8.0/10
Nash Country Weekly	A
PopMatters	7/10 stars
Rolling Stone	4/5 stars
Spin	7/10
Vice (Expert Witness)	(3-star Honorable Mention)

Mr. Misunderstood received widespread acclaim from music critics. At Metacritic, which assigns a "weighted average" rating out of 100 from selected independent ratings and reviews from mainstream critics, the album received a Metascore of 84 out of 100, based on 8 reviews, indicating "universal acclaim".

Awarding the album five stars out of five, AllMusic's Stephen Thomas Erlewine stated "Mr. Misunderstood is built for the long haul: it settles into the soul, its pleasures immediate but also sustained." Jon Dolan, giving the album four stars at Rolling Stone, judged that "Church's well-observed writing and warm, generous wit ground the album, particularly on two examples of the small-town vignettes he does so well". Rating the album a seven out of ten from Spin, Jonathan Bernstein said that it is a "small shame, then, that he chose what might have been the safest move: making what is sure to become the most agreeable, least controversial record of his career." Jon Caramanica, writing a review at The New York Times, said: "The album, a love letter to his influences, is the gentlest of Mr. Church's releases, the one that least wears his rowdy tendencies on its sleeve." Reviewing the album for the Milwaukee Journal Sentinel, Erik Ernst felt that "Church is country music's weird kid, who bucked the industry's expectations to chase cookie-cutter radio hits and defiantly forged his voice as an innovative, authentic songwriter." Sarah Rodman, critiquing the album from The Boston Globe, remarked, "He vaults over that bar with 'Mr. Misunderstood,' in some ways a love letter to music itself and to the ways it can save a soul, a heart, a sense of self." Assigning the album an A-grade from Nash Country Weekly, Bob Paxman opined that "Mr. Misunderstood is more of the stripped-down, heart-in-the-heartland version of Eric that won fans over in the beginning, without the overproduction that sometimes plagued The Outsiders." Craig Manning, giving the album eight out of ten at AbsolutePunk, wrote: "Mr. Misunderstood is the first album from Church where I've viewed him not just as 'good, for mainstream country,' but as 'great, 'period.'" Anthony Easton, signaling in a seven out of ten review from PopMatters, remarked that "it includes excellent vocals, sophisticated musical choices, and strong storytelling chops."

=== Accolades ===
Year	Association	Category	Result
2016	ACM Awards	Album of the Year	Nominated
2016	CMA Awards	Album of the Year	Won
2016	British CMA Awards	International Album of the Year	Nominated

Publication	Rank	List
AllMusic	N/A	AllMusic Best of 2015
The Guardian	3	The 10 Best Country Albums of 2015
Nashville Scene	5	Best Country Albums of 2015
PopMatters	6	The Best Country Music of 2015
Rolling Stone	27	50 Best Albums of 2015
Rolling Stone	4	40 Best Country Albums of 2015

== Commercial performance ==
Within two days of sales in its first chart week, Mr. Misunderstood debuted at number three on the US Billboard 200 with 76,000 equivalent album units (70,000 from digital sales). The following week, its first to count a full week of sales, the album climbed to number two on the Billboard 200 chart, selling an additional 65,000 units (58,000 pure album sales). The album was certified Platinum by the RIAA on January 3, 2018, for a million units in combined sales and streams. As of June 2018, the album has sold 599,600 copies in the United States.

== Track listing ==
All tracks are written by Eric Church, with additional co-writers as noted.

No.	Title	Writer(s)	Length
1.	"Mr. Misunderstood"	Casey Beathard	5:18
2.	"Mistress Named Music"	Beathard	5:22
3.	"Chattanooga Lucy" (featuring Joanna Cotten)	Jeff Hyde; Ryan Tyndell	3:23
4.	"Mixed Drinks About Feelings" (featuring Susan Tedeschi)		3:00
5.	"Knives of New Orleans"	Travis Meadows; Jeremy Spillman	4:02
6.	"Round Here Buzz"	Luke Dick; Hyde	3:35
7.	"Kill a Word" (featuring Andrea Davidson & Rhiannon Giddens)	Dick; Hyde	3:20
8.	"Holdin' My Own"		3:56
9.	"Record Year"	Hyde	2:59
10.	"Three Year Old"	Beathard; Monty Criswell	3:45
Total length:			38:41

Deluxe Edition
No.	Title	Length
11.	"Chattanooga Lucy" (live at Red Rocks)	3:59
12.	"Hallelujah" (live at Red Rocks)	4:48
13.	"Knives of New Orleans" (live at Red Rocks)	4:20
Total length:		51:50

== Charts ==
=== Weekly charts ===
Chart (2015)	Peak position
Canadian Albums (Billboard)	3
US Billboard 200	2
US Top Country Albums (Billboard)	2

=== Year-end charts ===
Chart (2015)	Position
US Top Country Albums (Billboard)	33
Chart (2016)	Position
US Billboard 200	50
US Top Country Albums (Billboard)	8
Chart (2017)	Position
US Billboard 200	134
US Top Country Albums (Billboard)	22
Chart (2018)	Position
US Top Country Albums (Billboard)	36

=== Decade-end charts ===
Chart (2010–2019)	Position
US Top Country Albums (Billboard)	40

== Certifications ==
Region	Certification	Certified units/sales
United States (RIAA)	Platinum	1,000,000^{‡}
^{‡} Sales+streaming figures based on certification alone.
