= Kill a Word =

Single by Eric Church featuring Rhiannon Giddens

from the album Mr. Misunderstood
- Released: August 29, 2016
- Recorded: 2015
- Genre: Country
- Length: 3:20
- Label: EMI Nashville
- Songwriter(s): Eric Church; Luke Dick; Jeff Hyde
- Producer(s): Jay Joyce

Eric Church singles chronology
"Record Year" (2016)	"Kill a Word" (2016)	"Round Here Buzz" (2017)

Rhiannon Giddens singles chronology
"Lay Your Money Down" (2012)	"Kill a Word" (2016)	"Come Sunday" (2016)

"Kill a Word" is a song co-written and recorded by American country music artist Eric Church as a duet with American musician Rhiannon Giddens. It was released in August 2016 as the third single from Church's 2015 album Mr. Misunderstood. Church wrote this song with Luke Dick and Jeff Hyde.

== Content ==
The song is about the power and importance of words, and wanting to "kill" words with negative meanings, such as "hate." The album version features Andrea Davidson and Rhiannon Giddens, the latter a member of the Carolina Chocolate Drops, on backing vocals. For the single edit, Giddens sings some lines of the song by herself.

Church told Rolling Stone that the 2016 presidential election was influential in picking "Kill a Word" as a single: "I would have regretted not putting out 'Kill a Word,' and let this season pass, not knowing if I would get a chance again where it was this relevant, this timely."

== Music video ==
The music video was directed by Shaun Silva and premiered on CMT, GAC, and Vevo in 2016.

== Critical reception ==
Billy Dukes of Taste of Country wrote that "Soulful production and the addition of Rhiannon Giddens gives [sic] a more casual listener something to enjoy if he or she chooses not to dive into Church’s statement." Giving it an "A", Kevin John Coyne of Country Universe wrote that "Songs that aim for utopia usually stumble along the way because they are either too preachy or too woefully naive. Church avoids this trap by zeroing in on the obstacles rather than the goal, and personalizes the proceedings by tackling what gets in the way of individual pursuit of happiness."

Church and Giddens were nominated for Musical Event of the Year at the 51st Annual Country Music Association Awards in 2017.

== Commercial performance ==
The song debuted on the Country Airplay chart at No. 58 for the chart dated September 10, 2016, and entered the Hot Country Songs chart three weeks later at No. 41. The song has sold 194,000 copies in the United States as of March 2017. The song was certified Gold by the RIAA on August 17, 2017 for 500,000 units in sales and streams.

== Chart performance ==
=== Weekly charts ===
Chart (2016–2017)	Peak position
Canada (Canadian Hot 100)	71
Canada Country (Billboard)	5
US Billboard Hot 100	71
US Country Airplay (Billboard)	6
US Hot Country Songs (Billboard)	9

=== Year-end charts ===
Chart (2016)	Position
US Hot Country Songs (Billboard)	100

Chart (2017)	Position
Canada Country (Billboard)	17
US Country Airplay (Billboard)	36
US Hot Country Songs (Billboard)	48

== Certifications ==
Region	Certification	Certified units/sales
United States (RIAA)	Platinum	1,000,000^{‡}
^{‡} Sales+streaming figures based on certification alone.
