= Paul McGuire (radio host) =

Paul McGuire (born 1953) is an American conservative radio talk show host, author, feature film producer and television commentator. McGuire is host of the syndicated McGuire Report, broadcasting for over 10 years. He is a frequent guest on the Fox News Network and CNN. He is the author of 15 books, the producer of two science fiction films and has written columns for WorldNetDaily and NewsMax. The History Channel presented a three-hour special with McGuire entitled Seven Signs of the Apocalypse.

== Career ==
The Paul McGuire Show was a nationally syndicated radio talk show with a conservative point of view. Guests included former President Jimmy Carter, Tim LaHaye, White House Press Secretary Tony Snow, Senator John McCain, Rick Warren, Israeli Prime Minister Ehud Olmert, PLO leaders and Anne Rice.

McGuire was one of the first radio talk show hosts in the US to broadcast his shows in both English and Spanish. He frequently had nationally known attorneys and legal defense guests on his show including Brad Dacus of the Pacific Justice Institute, the Alliance Defense Fund and John Whitehead of the Rutherford Institute. In addition, McGuire regularly hosted guests from the Defense Department, Department of State and the White House. McGuire often had guests with opposing points of view on the show. He received the distinguished Excellence In Media Award from the Pacific Justice Institute at a ceremony that honored media personalities.

== Bibliography ==
- Supernatural Faith in the New Age (1987) ISBN 0-88368-200-1
- Evangelizing the New Age: The Power of the Gospel Invades the New Age Movement (1989) ISBN 0-89283-633-4
- Who Will Rule the Future? (1991) ISBN 0-910311-94-3
- The Breakthrough Manual (1993) ISBN 0-88270-658-6
- Spirit-Filled Life Kingdom Dynamics Study Guides: People of the Covenant: God's New Covenant for Today (1994)
- Spirit-Filled Life Bible Discovery Guides: A Study of the Wilderness Books Exodus, Leviticus, Numbers, Deuteronomy: Milestones to Maturity (1994)
- From Earthquakes to Global Unity: The End Times Have Begun (1996) ISBN 1-56384-107-X
- Countdown to Armageddon (2000) ISBN 0-88419-656-9
- Growing in the Laws of Grace
- Are You Ready?
- The Warning
- The Day the Dollar Died
- Are You Ready for the Microchip?
- Trumpocalypse (2018)
