= Mr. Misunderstood (song) =

Single by Eric Church

from the album Mr. Misunderstood
- Released: November 9, 2015
- Recorded: 2015
- Genre: Country; heartland rock
- Length: 5:18
- Label: EMI Nashville
- Songwriter(s): Eric Church; Casey Beathard
- Producer(s): Jay Joyce

Eric Church singles chronology
"Like a Wrecking Ball" (2015)	"Mr. Misunderstood" (2015)	"Record Year" (2016)

"Mr. Misunderstood" is a song co-written and recorded by American country music artist Eric Church. was released in November 2015 as the first single and title track from his 2015 album Mr. Misunderstood. The song peaked at number 15 on both the U.S. Billboard Country Airplay and Hot Country Songs charts respectively. It also charted at number 84 on the Hot 100. The song has sold 197,000 copies in the United States as of February 2016. It received similar chart success in Canada, peaking at number 7 on the Canadian Country chart and at number 70 on the Canadian Hot 100. The song, written by Church and Casey Beathard, has also received some positive reviews from music critics.

== Content ==
The song's narrator addresses a misfit teenager, expressing sympathy for his being "misunderstood". In it, Church "says some encouraging words about the good things that will happen one day when people will appreciate him — especially the ladies." The song features no chorus, but rather a series of verses that all end in the title phrase. Among the lyrics, he name-drops singers that have influenced him, including Elvis Costello, Ray Wylie Hubbard, and Jeff Tweedy of Wilco. He also recalls a young woman with whom he was in love, despite her father's unfavorable opinions of him, as well as Church's own "journey to becoming the musician he is now". As the song's tempo decreases again, Church echoes the title phrase, along with the words "I understand". The song features several changes in tempo, with the middle verses being faster than the slower verses at the beginning and end. The acoustic and steel guitars are the primary instruments.

== Reception ==
=== Critical ===
Stephen Thomas Erlewine of AllMusic wrote that the song "opens the door upon the possibility that the rest of the songs on the record -- the tales of heartbreak and longing, maybe even the stories of love and family -- are characters, not confession." Billy Dukes of Taste of Country was also favorable, saying that "At its core, the track is a five-minute pep talk to the freak that lives inside all of us. He keeps rattling that nerve, and it keeps feeling good."

Rolling Stone ranked "Mr. Misunderstood" at number 28 on its annual year-end list to find the best songs of 2015.

=== Commercial ===
On the charts dated for the week ending November 21, 2015, the song debuted at No. 36 on the U.S. Billboard Country Airplay chart and at No. 32 on Hot Country Songs, with 18,000 copies sold in its first week. It was the second most-added song to playlists of country stations on the publication's survey, behind only "Break on Me" by Keith Urban. The corresponding album debuted at No. 3 on Top Country Albums during the same week. The song debuted on the Billboard Hot 100 at No. 92 for chart dated January 16. 2016. The song peaked at No. 15 on both the Country Airplay and the Hot Country Songs charts. The song has sold 197,000 copies in the US as of February 2016. The song was certified Gold by the RIAA on August 17, 2017, for 500,000 units in sales and streams.

== Music video ==
The accompanying music video for this song features Church singing the song in a school room. A teenage boy representing the one in the story is seen learning how to play guitar, and at the end of the video, leads the band in the song. The music video won the award for Video of the Year at the 2016 ACM Awards.

== Accolades ==
Year	Association	Category	Result
2016	ACM Awards	Video of the Year	Won

== Chart performance ==
=== Weekly charts ===
Chart (2015–2016)	Peak position
Canada (Canadian Hot 100)	70
Canada Country (Billboard)	7
US Billboard Hot 100	84
US Country Airplay (Billboard)	15
US Hot Country Songs (Billboard)	15

=== Year-end charts ===
Chart (2016)	Position
US Hot Country Songs (Billboard)	73

== Certifications ==
Region	Certification	Certified units/sales
Canada (Music Canada)	Gold	40,000^{‡}
United States (RIAA)	Gold	500,000^{‡} / 197,000
^{‡} Sales+streaming figures based on certification alone.
