= Record Year =

Single by Eric Church

from the album Mr. Misunderstood
- Released: February 16, 2016
- Recorded: 2015
- Genre: Country
- Length: 2:59
- Label: EMI Nashville
- Songwriter(s): Eric Church; Jeff Hyde
- Producer(s): Jay Joyce

Eric Church singles chronology
"Mr. Misunderstood" (2015)	"Record Year" (2016)	"Kill a Word" (2016)

"Record Year" is a song co-written and recorded by American country music artist Eric Church. It was released in February 2016 as the second single from his 2015 album Mr. Misunderstood. Church wrote the song with Jeff Hyde. The song peaked at number 44 on the Billboard Hot 100 and number one on the Country Airplay chart.

== Content ==
The song is about a man who recovers from a broken heart by listening to a collection of vinyl record albums. Its lyrics include references to various musical artists to whom the narrator is listening.

== Critical reception ==
Billy Dukes of Taste of Country reviewed the single favorably, praising the songwriting and saying that "Eric Church has never sung heartbreak the same way twice — a streak that remains intact with Record Year. The second single from his Mr. Misunderstood album finds him hurting in a whole new way."

== Commercial performance ==
"Record Year" reached No. 1 on the Country Airplay chart, which is Church's seventh No. 1 on the chart. It also peaked at No. 2 on the Hot Country Songs chart. The song has sold 447,000 copies in the US as of November 2016. It was certified double Platinum by the RIAA on April 29, 2019 for two million units in sales and streams.

== Music video ==
The music video was directed by Reid Long and John Peets and premiered in April 2016.

== Charts and certifications ==
=== Weekly charts ===
Chart (2016)	Peak position
Canada (Canadian Hot 100)	79
Canada Country (Billboard)	1
US Billboard Hot 100	44
US Country Airplay (Billboard)	1
US Hot Country Songs (Billboard)	2

=== Year end charts ===
Chart (2016)	Position
US Country Airplay (Billboard)	10
US Hot Country Songs (Billboard)	17

=== Certifications ===
Region	Certification	Certified units/sales
Canada (Music Canada)	Gold	40,000^{‡}
United States (RIAA)	2× Platinum	2,000,000^{‡} / 447,000
^{‡} Sales+streaming figures based on certification alone.
