= 61st Academy of Country Music Awards =

2026 US music awards ceremony

- Date: May 17, 2026
- Location: MGM Grand Garden Arena, Las Vegas, Nevada
- Hosted by: Shania Twain

Highlights
- Most wins: Ella Langley (5)
- Most nominations: Megan Moroney (8)

Television/radio coverage
- Network: Prime Video

The 61st Academy of Country Music Awards was held on May 17, 2026, at the MGM Grand Garden Arena in Las Vegas, Nevada. Shania Twain hosted the ceremony.

== Background ==
On May 15, 2025, the Academy of Country Music and Prime Video announced that they were extending the partnership through 2028. It was later announced that the show would be returning to Las Vegas for the first time since 2022, with the ceremony to be held at the MGM Grand Garden Arena for the first time since the 2019 ceremony.

On April 22, it was announced that Shania Twain would host the ceremony. This is Twain's first time hosting the ceremony, having previously won three ACM awards, including Entertainer of the Year in 2000, as well as the ACM's Poet's Award.

== Winners and nominees ==
The nominations for the awards were revealed on April 9, 2026. The eligibility period for submissions ran from January 1, 2025, to December 31, 2025. Winners for several categories were announced in the weeks before the ceremony.

Entertainer of the Year	Album of the Year
Cody Johnson; Luke Combs; Jelly Roll; Megan Moroney; Chris Stapleton; Morgan Wallen; Lainey Wilson	Parker McCollum — Parker McCollum; Ain't in It for My Health — Zach Top; Cherry Valley — Carter Faith; Don't Mind If I Do (Deluxe) — Riley Green; I'm the Problem — Morgan Wallen
Female Artist of the Year	Male Artist of the Year
Ella Langley; Kelsea Ballerini; Miranda Lambert; Megan Moroney; Lainey Wilson	Cody Johnson; Luke Combs; Riley Green; Chris Stapleton; Zach Top
Group of the Year	Duo of the Year
The Red Clay Strays; 49 Winchester; Flatland Cavalry; Old Dominion; Rascal Flatts	Brooks & Dunn; Brothers Osborne; Dan + Shay; Muscadine Bloodline; Thelma & James
Single of the Year	Song of the Year
"Choosin' Texas" — Ella Langley; "6 Months Later" — Megan Moroney; "I Never Lie" — Zach Top; "Somewhere Over Laredo" — Lainey Wilson; "The Fall" — Cody Johnson	"Choosin' Texas" — Ella Langley, Luke Dick, Miranda Lambert, Joybeth Taylor; "A Song to Sing" — Chris Stapleton, Miranda Lambert, Jenee Fleenor, Jesse Frasure; "Am I Okay?" — Megan Moroney, Jessie Jo Dillon, Luke Laird; "I Never Lie" — Zach Top, Carson Chamberlain, Tim Nichols; "Somewhere Over Laredo" — Lainey Wilson, Trannie Anderson, Dallas Wilson, Andy Albert, Harold Arlen, Yip Harburg
New Female Artist of the Year	New Male Artist of the Year
Avery Anna; MacKenzie Carpenter; Dasha; Caroline Jones; Emily Ann Roberts	Tucker Wetmore; Gavin Adcock; Vincent Mason; Shaboozey; Hudson Westbrook
Artist-Songwriter of the Year	Songwriter of the Year
Ella Langley; Luke Combs; Riley Green; Megan Moroney; Morgan Wallen	Jessie Jo Dillon; Ashley Gorley; Charlie Handsome; Chase McGill; Blake Pendergrass
Visual Media of the Year	Music Event of the Year
"Cuckoo" — Stephen Wilson Jr. (Dir. Tim Cofield); "6 Months Later" — Megan Moroney (Dir. CeCe Dawson and Megan Moroney); "A Song to Sing" — Miranda Lambert and Chris Stapleton (Dir. Alexa King Stone and Stephen Kinigopoulos); "Somewhere Over Laredo" — Lainey Wilson (Dir. TK McKamy); "The Fall" — Cody Johnson (Dir. Dustin Haney)	"Don't Mind If I Do" — Riley Green and Ella Langley; "A Song to Sing" — Miranda Lambert and Chris Stapleton; "Amen" — Shaboozey and Jelly Roll; "Trailblazer" — Reba McEntire, Miranda Lambert, and Lainey Wilson; "You Had to Be There" — Megan Moroney and Kenny Chesney

== Performers ==
Announced performers for the ceremony include:

Performer(s)	Song
Lainey Wilson	"Can't Sit Still"
Miranda Lambert	"Crisco"
Thomas Rhett; Jordan Davis	"Ain't A Bad Life"
Avery Anna	"Blood Runs Thicker"
Riley Green	"Change My Mind"
Zach Top	"Honky Tonk Till It Hurts"
Little Big Town	"Hey There Sunshine"
The Red Clay Strays	"Demons In Your Choir"
Tucker Wetmore	"Brunette"
Parker McCollum; Lee Ann Womack	"Killin' Me"
Kacey Musgraves	"Dry Spell"
Ella Langley	"Be Her"
Carter Faith	"If I Had Never Lost My Mind..."
Cody Johnson	"Travelin' Soldier"
Kane Brown	"Woman"
Dan + Shay	"Say So"
Blake Shelton	In memory of Don Schlitz "The Gambler"

== Presenters ==
- Michael Bublé — presented Song of the Year
- Andrew Whitworth and Ryan Fitzpatrick — presented Group of the Year
- Carl Edwards and Corey LaJoie — presented Duo of the Year
- Shaboozey — presented Single of the Year
- The War and Treaty — presented Music Event of the Year
- Ashley McBryde — presented Male Artist of the Year
- TJ Osborne — presented Female Artist of the Year
- Keith Urban — presented Album of the Year
- Lauren Alaina — introduced Dan + Shay
- Shania Twain — presented Entertainer of the Year

== Milestones ==
- Miranda Lambert received her fourth win for Song of the Year, as a songwriter on "Choosin' Texas", making her the most decorated artist in the category; it is her thirty-second win overall, extending her record as the ACM's most decorated artist.
- Brooks & Dunn received their eighteenth win and twenty-second nomination for Duo of the Year, extending their record as the most decorated artists in the category.
- Carter Faith's Cherry Valley is the first debut album, since Chris Stapleton's Traveller, to receive a nomination.
- Megan Moroney received her first nomination for Entertainer of the Year.
- Miranda Lambert received her seventeenth nomination for Female Artist of the Year, extending her record in the category.
