= Academy of Country Music Award for New Female Artist of the Year =

Annual US country music award

- Country: United States
- Presented by: Academy of Country Music
- First award: 1966
- Currently held by: Avery Anna (61st)

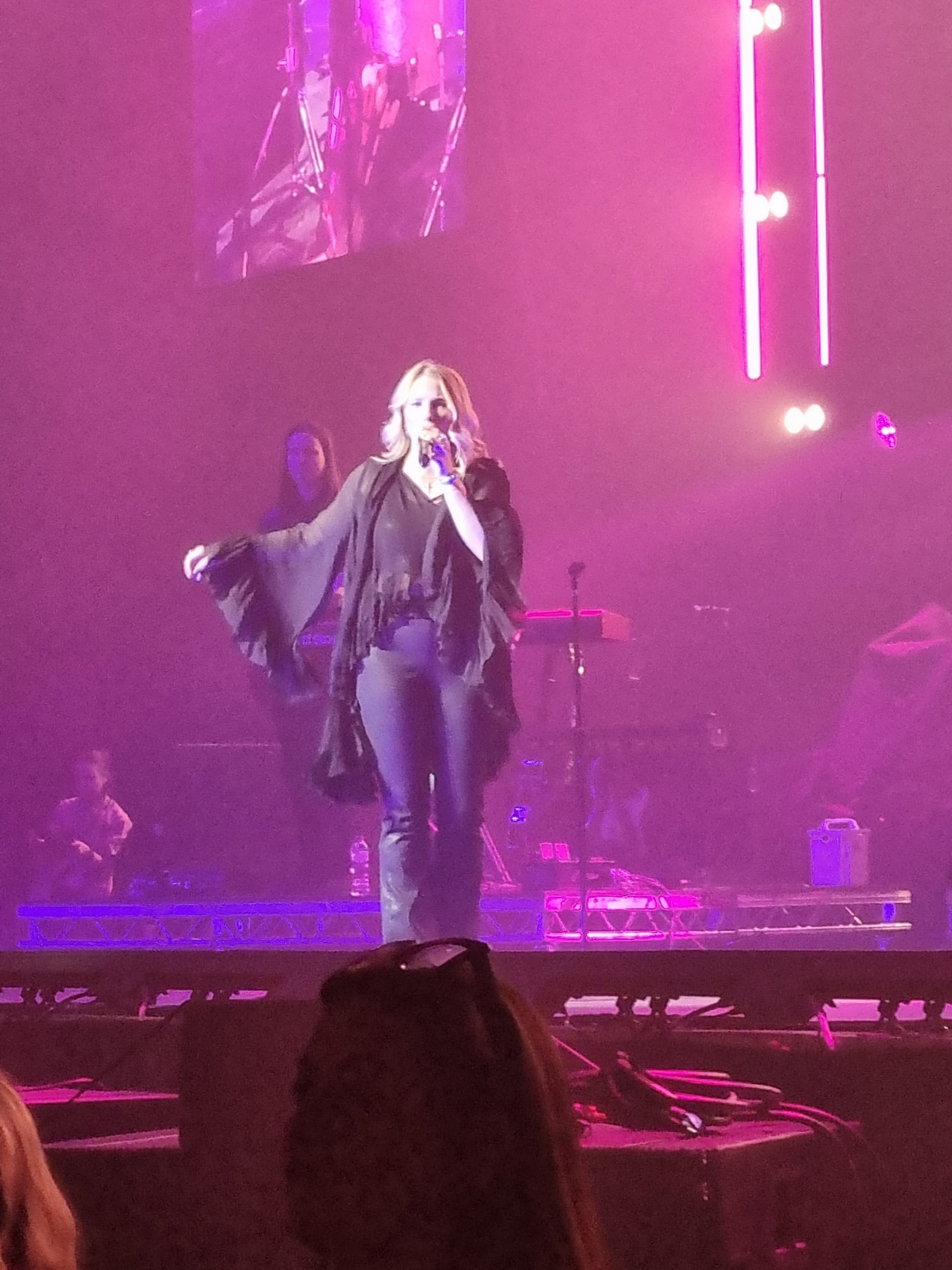
2026 recipient, Avery Anna

The Academy of Country Music Award for New Female Artist of the Year is one of the new artist categories presented at the Academy of Country Music Awards. This award was first awarded in 1966 to Kay Adams, when this award was known as the Most Promising Female Vocalist.

From 1966 to 1977, this award was known as the Most Promising Female Vocalist. 1978 to 2008, the award was known as the Top New Female Vocalist. 2016 to now, this award is now known as the New Female Artist of the Year.

This award is given to the new female artist who has gained initial fame or significantly greater recognition during the promotion of a debut or sophomore album within the eligibility period. The artist must have released a single that reached the Top 40 on Billboard's Hot Country Songs or the Mediabase Country charts. Any albums self-released through an independent label the artist owns and operates may not be counted as a debut or sophomore album, unless it produces a Top 40 single reported by Billboard's Hot Country Songs or Mediabase Country charts.The winner of this award is eligible for the Triple Crown Award, if they win a Female Artist of the Year, and Entertainer of the Year.

== Winners and nominees ==
In the following tables, the years correspond to the date of the ceremony. Artists are eligible based on their work of the previous calendar year. Entries with a blue ribbon next to the artist's name have won the award; those with a white background are the nominees on the short-list.

There was no winner for this award in 2004, 2005, and from 2009 to 2015. For the award was changed into the Academy of Country Music Award for New Artist of the Year award. The winners in 2009 and 2013 would be finalist for the New Artist of the Year.

=== 2020s ===
Year	Winner	Nominees
2026	Avery Anna	MacKenzie Carpenter; Dasha; Caroline Jones; Emily Ann Roberts
2025	Ella Langley	Kassi Ashton; Ashley Cooke; Dasha; Jessie Murph
2024	Megan Moroney	Kassi Ashton; Ashley Cooke; Hannah Ellis; Kylie Morgan
2023	Hailey Whitters	Priscilla Block; Megan Moroney; Caitlyn Smith; Morgan Wade
2022	Lainey Wilson	Tenille Arts; Priscilla Block; Lily Rose; Caitlyn Smith
2021	Gabby Barrett	Ingrid Andress; Tenille Arts; Mickey Guyton; Caylee Hammack
2020	Tenille Townes	Ingrid Andress; Gabby Barrett; Lindsay Ell; Caylee Hammack

=== 2010s ===
Year	Winner	Nominees
2019	Ashley McBryde	Danielle Bradbery; Lindsay Ell; Carly Pearce
2018	Lauren Alaina	Danielle Bradbery; Carly Pearce; RaeLynn
2017	Maren Morris	Lauren Alaina; Cam; Brandy Clark
2016	Kelsea Ballerini	Cam; Mickey Guyton; RaeLynn
2013	Jana Kramer	Kacey Musgraves; Sunny Sweeney

=== 2000s ===
Year	Winner	Nominees
2009	Julianne Hough	Sarah Buxton; Ashton Shepherd
2008	Taylor Swift	Sarah Buxton; Kellie Pickler
2007	Miranda Lambert	Kellie Pickler; Taylor Swift
2006	Carrie Underwood	Miranda Lambert; Julie Roberts
2003	Kellie Coffey	Jennifer Hanson; Rebecca Lynn Howard
2002	Carolyn Dawn Johnson	Tammy Cochran; Cyndi Thomson
2001	Jamie O'Neal	Tammy Cochran; Carolyn Dawn Johnson
2000	Jessica Andrews	Julie Reeves; Chalee Tennison

=== 1990s ===
Year	Winner	Nominees
1999	Jo Dee Messina	Sherrie Austin; Allison Moorer
1998	Lee Ann Womack	Sara Evans; Lila McCann
1997	LeAnn Rimes	Deana Carter; Mindy McCready
1996	Shania Twain	Terri Clark; Alison Krauss
1995	Chely Wright	Lisa Brokop; Victoria Shaw
1994	Faith Hill	Lari White; Kelly Willis
1993	Michelle Wright	Martina McBride; Joy Lynn White
1992	Trisha Yearwood	Paulette Carlson; Ronna Reeves
1991	Shelby Lynne	Matraca Berg; Carlene Carter
1990	Mary Chapin Carpenter	Daniele Alexander; Jann Browne

=== 1980s ===
Year	Winner	Nominees
1989	Suzy Bogguss	Vicki Bird; Cee Cee Chapman; Linda Davis; Donna Meade
1988	K.T. Oslin	Nanci Griffith; Libby Hurley; k.d lang; Dana McVicker
1987	Holly Dunn	Darlene Austin; Lisa Childress; Rosie Flores; Pam Tillis
1986	Judy Rodman	Liz Boardo; Tari Hensley; Robin Lee; Patty Loveless
1985	Nicolette Larson	Becky Hobbs; Hilary Kanter; Katy Moffatt; Karen Taylor-Good
1984	Gus Hardin	Lane Brody; Amy Grant; Kathy Mattea; Lorrie Morgan
1983	Karen Brooks	Deborah Allen; Cindy Hurt; Sue Powell; Amy Wooley
1982	Juice Newton	Judy Bailey; Kippi Brannon; Terry Gregory; Tricia Johns
1981	Terri Gibbs	Kim Carnes; Reba McEntire; Sissy Spacek; Sylvia
1980	Lacy J. Dalton	Rosanne Cash; Gail Davies; Louise Mandrell; Sylvia

=== 1970s ===
Year	Winner	Nominees
1979	Cristy Lane	Susie Allanson; Zella Lehr; Charly McClain; Bonnie Tyler
1978	Debby Boone	Helen Cornelius; Janie Fricke; Stella Parton; Mary Lou Turner
1977	Billie Jo Spears	Dottsy; Mary Kay Place; Sunday Sharpe; Margo Smith
1976	Crystal Gayle	Barbie Benton; Jessi Colter; La Costa; Emmylou Harris
1975	Linda Ronstadt	Kay Austin; La Costa; Crystal Gayle; Sharon Leighton; Marilyn Sellars
1974	Olivia Newton-John	Debbie Hawkins; Sharon Leighton; Lawanda Lindsey; Linda Ronstadt
1973	Tanya Tucker	Sharon Leighton; Jonie Mosby; Bobbie Roy; Kathy Smith
1972	Barbara Mandrell	Kenni Husky; Jae Judy Kay; Jeanne Pruett; Lynda Peace
1971	Sammi Smith	Lynn Harper; Jae Judy Kay; Anne Murray; Susan Raye
1970	Donna Fargo	Peggy Little; Linda Manning; Susan Raye; Judy West

=== 1960s ===
Year	Winner	Nominees
1969	Cheryl Poole	Donna Fargo; Sandy Knox; Linda Manning; Judy West
1968	Bobbie Gentry	Faye Hardin; Sandy Knox; Sharon Leighton; Beth Moore
1967	Cathie Taylor	Jeanne Black; Faye Hardin; Betty Foster; Alice Rene
1966	Kay Adams	Jeanne Black; Faye Hardin; Betty Foster; Myrna Jay; Pamela Miller; Joanie O'Neal
