= Academy of Country Music Award for Artist-Songwriter of the Year =

- Country: United States
- Presented by: Academy of Country Music
- First award: 2023
- Currently held by: Ella Langley (61st)

This article lists the winners and nominees for the Academy of Country Music's Artist-Songwriter of the Year. The award was first given in 2023. The following is the list of winners, with the year representing the nominated work. This award is the newest competitive award created by the academy.

According to criteria for the award, "This award is presented to an individual known both as an artist and a songwriter who was the predominate recording artist." Additionally, the artist-songwriter's major work has to have charted with in the eligibility period.

== Winners and nominees ==
Year	Winner	Nominees
2026	Ella Langley	Luke Combs; Riley Green; Megan Moroney; Morgan Wallen
2025	Lainey Wilson	Luke Combs; Ernest; Hardy; Morgan Wallen
2024	Chris Stapleton	Zach Bryan; Ernest; Hardy; Morgan Wallen
2023	Hardy	Luke Combs; Ernest; Miranda Lambert; Morgan Wallen

== Category records ==
=== Wins ===
- Most wins — Hardy (1), Ella Langley (1), Chris Stapleton (1), Lainey Wilson (1)

=== Nominations ===
- Most nominated — Morgan Wallen (4)
