= Academy of Country Music Award for Female Artist of the Year =

Annual US country music award

- Country: United States
- Presented by: Academy of Country Music
- First award: 1966
- Currently held by: Ella Langley (61st)

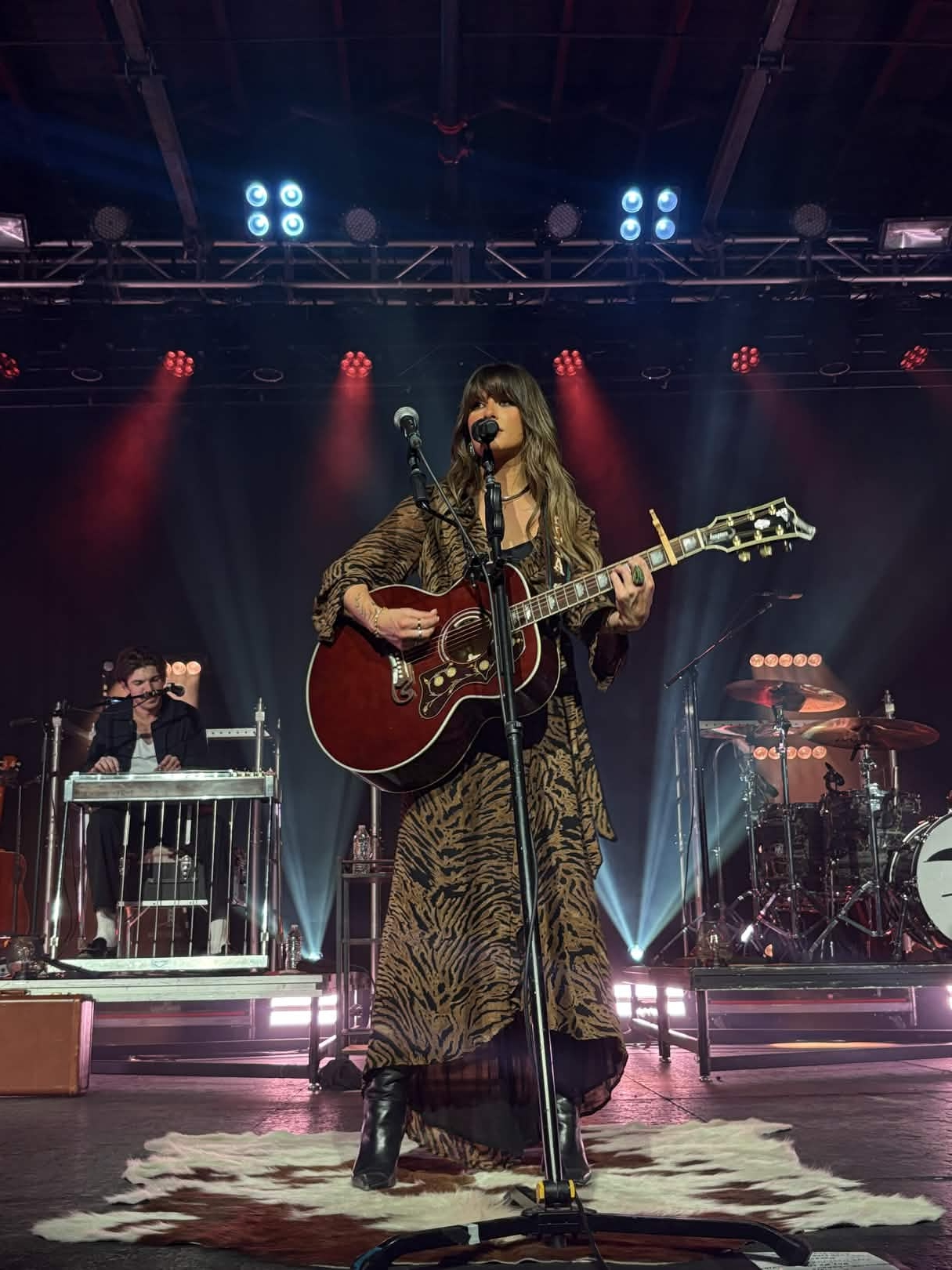
Ella Langley, the reigning winner of Female Artist of the Year, 2026.

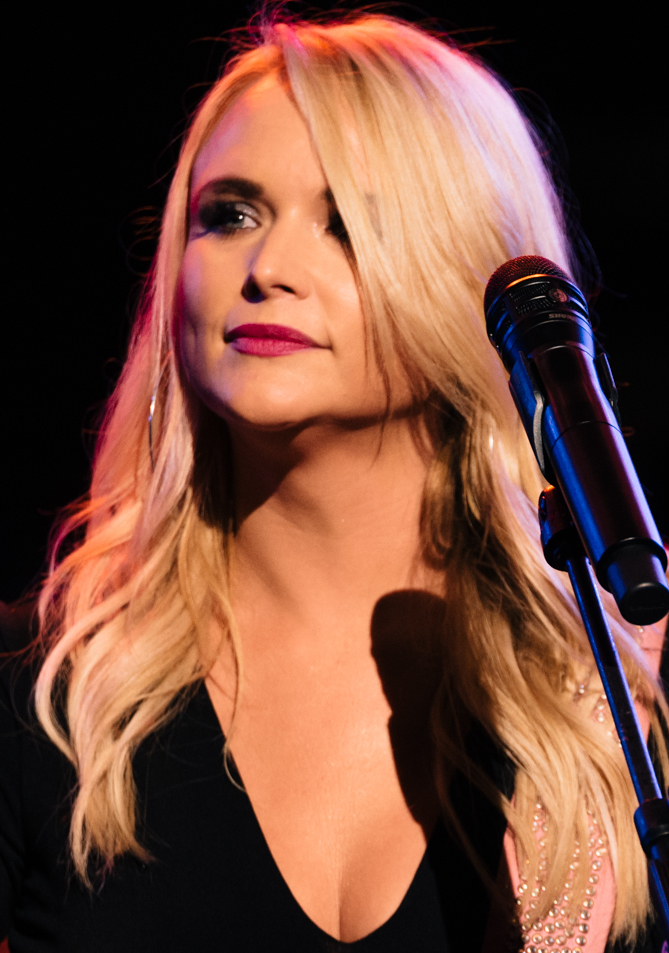
Miranda Lambert, the most decorated Female Artist of the Year with 9 wins.

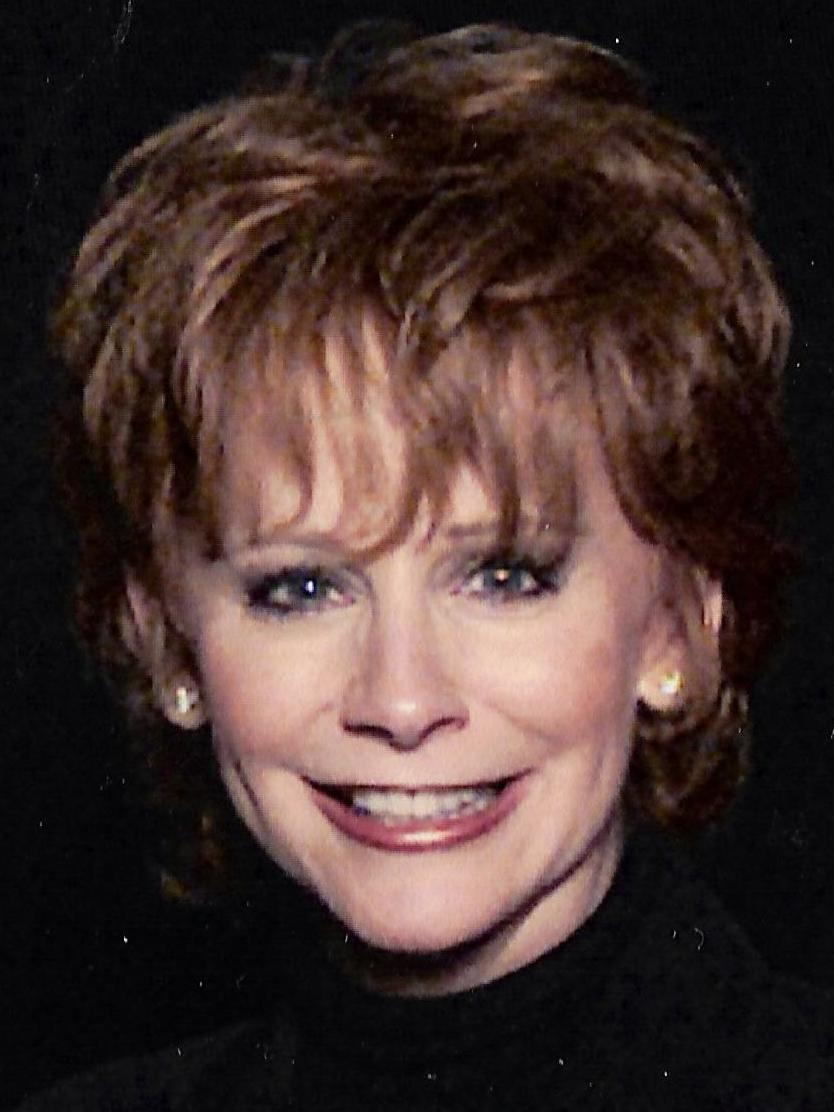
Reba McEntire, (along with Miranda Lambert) is the most nominated artist in this category.

The Academy of Country Music Award for Female Artist of the Year (formerly known as Top Female Vocalist, until 2011) is awarded to the top female country music artist of the past year. It is based on individual musical performance on a solo Country single or album release, as well as the overall contribution to Country Music.The following is the list of winners, with the year representing the nominated work. This Award goes to the artist. This award was one of the original awards given at the first ceremony in 1966. The first recipient was Bonnie Owens. The most recent recipient is Ella Langley.

== Recipients ==
Year	Winner	Nominees
2026	Ella Langley	Kelsea Ballerini; Miranda Lambert; Megan Moroney; Lainey Wilson
2025	Lainey Wilson	Kelsea Ballerini; Ella Langley; Megan Moroney; Kacey Musgraves
2024	Lainey Wilson	Kelsea Ballerini; Ashley McBryde; Megan Moroney; Kacey Musgraves
2023	Lainey Wilson	Kelsea Ballerini; Miranda Lambert; Ashley McBryde; Carly Pearce
2022	Carly Pearce	Gabby Barrett; Miranda Lambert; Ashley McBryde; Maren Morris
2021	Maren Morris	Kelsea Ballerini; Miranda Lambert; Ashley McBryde; Carly Pearce
2020	Maren Morris	Kelsea Ballerini; Miranda Lambert; Kacey Musgraves; Carrie Underwood
2019	Kacey Musgraves	Miranda Lambert; Ashley McBryde; Maren Morris; Carrie Underwood
2018	Miranda Lambert	Kelsea Ballerini; Maren Morris; Reba McEntire; Carrie Underwood
2017	Miranda Lambert	Kelsea Ballerini; Maren Morris; Kacey Musgraves; Carrie Underwood
2016	Miranda Lambert	Kelsea Ballerini; Jana Kramer; Kacey Musgraves; Carrie Underwood
2015	Miranda Lambert	Brandy Clark; Martina McBride; Kacey Musgraves; Carrie Underwood
2014	Miranda Lambert	Sheryl Crow; Kacey Musgraves; Carrie Underwood; Taylor Swift
2013	Miranda Lambert	Martina McBride; Kacey Musgraves; Carrie Underwood; Taylor Swift
2012	Miranda Lambert	Sara Evans; Martina McBride; Carrie Underwood; Taylor Swift
2011	Miranda Lambert	Reba McEntire; Carrie Underwood; Taylor Swift; Lee Ann Womack
2010	Miranda Lambert	Reba McEntire; Carrie Underwood; Taylor Swift; Lee Ann Womack
2009	Carrie Underwood	Miranda Lambert; Heidi Newfield; Taylor Swift; Lee Ann Womack
2008	Carrie Underwood	Martina McBride; Miranda Lambert; LeAnn Rimes; Taylor Swift
2007	Carrie Underwood	Sara Evans; Faith Hill; Martina McBride; Miranda Lambert
2006	Sara Evans	Martina McBride; Carrie Underwood; Gretchen Wilson; Lee Ann Womack
2005	Gretchen Wilson	Terri Clark; Sara Evans; Martina McBride; Lee Ann Womack
2004	Martina McBride	Terri Clark; Sara Evans; Patty Loveless; Shania Twain
2003	Martina McBride	Terri Clark; Faith Hill; Shania Twain; Lee Ann Womack
2002	Martina McBride	Faith Hill; Sara Evans; Lee Ann Womack; Trisha Yearwood
2001	Faith Hill	Sara Evans; Martina McBride; Jo Dee Messina; Lee Ann Womack
2000	Faith Hill	Martina McBride; Jo Dee Messina; Trisha Yearwood; Chely Wright
1999	Faith Hill	Martina McBride; Jo Dee Messina; Shania Twain; Trisha Yearwood
1998	Trisha Yearwood	Deana Carter; Martina McBride; Patty Loveless; LeAnn Rimes
1997	Patty Loveless	Reba McEntire; LeAnn Rimes; Shania Twain; Trisha Yearwood
1996	Patty Loveless	Faith Hill; Reba McEntire; Pam Tillis; Shania Twain
1995	Reba McEntire	Faith Hill; Mary Chapin Carpenter; Patty Loveless; Pam Tillis
1994	Wynonna	Mary Chapin Carpenter; Reba McEntire; Pam Tillis; Tanya Tucker
1993	Mary Chapin Carpenter	Lorrie Morgan; Pam Tillis; Tanya Tucker; Wynonna
1992	Reba McEntire	Mary Chapin Carpenter; Lorrie Morgan; Pam Tillis; Tanya Tucker
1991	Reba McEntire	Kathy Mattea; Mary Chapin Carpenter; Patty Loveless; Tanya Tucker
1990	Kathy Mattea	K.D. Lang; Reba McEntire; Dolly Parton; Tanya Tucker
1989	K.T. Oslin	Rosanne Cash; Kathy Mattea; Reba McEntire; Tanya Tucker
1988	Reba McEntire	Rosanne Cash; Crystal Gayle; Kathy Mattea; Tanya Tucker
1987	Reba McEntire	Janie Fricke; Crystal Gayle; Juice Newton; Marie Osmond
1986	Reba McEntire	Rosanne Cash; Crystal Gayle; Anne Murray; Juice Newton
1985	Reba McEntire	Janie Fricke; Emmylou Harris; Anne Murray; Dolly Parton
1984	Janie Fricke	Crystal Gayle; Barbara Mandrell; Reba McEntire; Sylvia
1983	Sylvia	Rosanne Cash; Janie Fricke; Barbara Mandrell; Dottie West
1982	Barbara Mandrell	Rosanne Cash; Lacy J. Dalto; Emmylou Harris; Sylvia
1981	Dolly Parton	Lacy J. Dalto; Emmylou Harris; Crystal Gayle; Barbara Mandrell
1980	Crystal Gayle	Anne Murray; Barbara Mandrell; Dolly Parton; Loretta Lynn
1979	Barbara Mandrell	Anne Murray; Crystal Gayle; Dolly Parton; Loretta Lynn
1978	Crystal Gayle	Loretta Lynn; Linda Ronstadt; Dolly Parton; Tammy Wynette
1977	Crystal Gayle	Emmylou Harris; Loretta Lynn; Dolly Parton; Tammy Wynette
1976	Loretta Lynn	Anne Murray; Linda Ronstadt; Dolly Parton; Tanya Tucker
1975	Loretta Lynn	Donna Fargo; Anne Murray; Olivia Newton-John; Dolly Parton
1974	Loretta Lynn	Barbara Fairchild; Donna Fargo; Anne Murray; Dolly Parton
1973	Donna Fargo	Loretta Lynn; Anne Murray; Dolly Parton; Susan Raye
1972	Loretta Lynn	Lynn Anderson; Anne Murray; Susan Raye; Linda Ronstadt
1971	Lynn Anderson	Bobbie Gentry; Loretta Lynn; Dolly Parton; Tammy Wynette
1970	Tammy Wynette	Lynn Anderson; Bobbie Gentry; Judy Lynn; Loretta Lynn; Dolly Parton; Connie Smith; Cathie Taylor
1969	Cathie Taylor	Bobbie Gentry; Bonnie Guitar; Judy Lynn; Jody Miller
1968	Lynn Anderson	Bonnie Guitar; Bonnie Owens; Lucille Starr; Cathie Taylor
1967	Bonnie Guitar	Kay Adams; Molly Bee; Janie Mosby; Bonnie Owens
1966	Bonnie Owens	Molly Bee; Rose Lee Maphis; Rose Maddox; Jody Miller

== Category records ==
=== Wins ===
- Most wins — Miranda Lambert (9).
  - Most wins from the 1960s — n/a.
  - Most wins from the 1970s — Loretta Lynn (4).
  - Most wins from the 1980s — Reba McEntire (4).
  - Most wins from the 1990s — Reba McEntire (3).
  - Most wins from the 2000s — Martina McBride and Carrie Underwood (3).
  - Most wins from the 2010s — Miranda Lambert (9).
  - Most wins from the 2020s — Lainey Wilson (3).

=== Nominations ===
- Most nominated — Miranda Lambert (17).
  - Most nominated from the 1960s — Bonnie Guitar and Bonnie Owens (3).
  - Most nominated from the 1970s — Loretta Lynn (10).
  - Most nominated from the 1980s — Crystal Gayle and Reba McEntire (6).
  - Most nominated from the 1990s — Reba McEntire (7).
  - Most nominated from the 2000s — Martina McBride (9).
  - Most nominated from the 2010s — Miranda Lambert and Carrie Underwood (10).
  - Most nominated from the 2020s — Kelsea Ballerini (6).
