= 59th Academy of Country Music Awards =

US music awards ceremony in 2024

- Date: May 16, 2024
- Location: Ford Center at The Star, Frisco, Texas
- Hosted by: Reba McEntire

Highlights
- Most wins: Chris Stapleton; Lainey Wilson; (3 each)
- Most nominations: Morgan Wallen (6)

Television/radio coverage
- Network: Prime Video

The 59th Academy of Country Music Awards was held on May 16, 2024, at the Ford Center at The Star in Frisco, Texas. Country music icon Reba McEntire returned as host.

== Background ==
On November 2, 2023, the Academy of Country Music announced that it would renew its partnership with Prime Video through 2025. The eligibility period for submissions for the 59th Academy of Country Music Awards was January 1, 2023, through December 31, 2023.

=== Category changes ===
On December 4, 2023, the academy announced that it would be changing rules for its New Artist categories, as well as bringing back the New Duo/Group of the Year award. Changing the amount of submissions needed and lowering other thresholds to "benefit emerging artists and help put a spotlight on the future of the genre", according to Daniel Miller, chair of the ACM awards, voting, and membership committee.

== Winners and nominees ==
The nominees were revealed on April 9, on social media and The Bobby Bones Show.

Entertainer of the Year	Album of the Year
Lainey Wilson; Kane Brown; Luke Combs; Jelly Roll; Cody Johnson; Chris Stapleton; Morgan Wallen	Higher – Chris Stapleton; Gettin' Old – Luke Combs; Leather – Cody Johnson; One Thing at a Time – Morgan Wallen; Rolling Up the Welcome Mat (For Good) – Kelsea Ballerini
Female Artist of the Year	Male Artist of the Year
Lainey Wilson; Kelsea Ballerini; Ashley McBryde; Megan Moroney; Kacey Musgraves	Chris Stapleton; Luke Combs; Jelly Roll; Cody Johnson; Morgan Wallen
Group of the Year	Duo of the Year
Old Dominion; Flatland Cavalry; Lady A; Little Big Town; Zac Brown Band	Dan + Shay; Brooks & Dunn; Brothers Osborne; Maddie & Tae; The War and Treaty
Single of the Year	Song of the Year
"Fast Car" – Luke Combs; "Burn It Down" – Parker McCollum; "Last Night" – Morgan Wallen; "Need a Favor" – Jelly Roll; "Next Thing You Know" – Jordan Davis	"Next Thing You Know" – Jordan Davis, Chase McGill, Greylan James, Josh Osborne; "Fast Car" – Tracy Chapman; "Heart Like a Truck" – Trannie Anderson, Dallas Wilson, Lainey Wilson; "Tennessee Orange" – David Fanning, Megan Moroney, Paul Jenkins, Ben Williams; "The Painter" – Benjy Davis, Kat Higgins, Ryan Larkins
New Female Artist of the Year	New Male Artist of the Year
Megan Moroney; Kassi Ashton; Ashley Cooke; Hannah Ellis; Kylie Morgan	Nate Smith; Ernest; Kameron Marlowe; Dylan Scott; Conner Smith
New Duo/Group of the Year	Artist-Songwriter of the Year
Tigirlily Gold; Neon Union; Restless Road	Chris Stapleton; Zach Bryan; Ernest; Hardy; Morgan Wallen
Songwriter of the Year	Visual Media of the Year
Jessie Jo Dillon; Ashley Gorley; Hillary Lindsey; Chase McGill; Josh Thompson	"Burn It Down" – Parker McCollum; Dir. Dustin Haney; "Human" – Cody Johnson; Dir. Dustin Haney; "In Your Love" – Tyler Childers; Dir. Bryan Schlam; "Next Thing You Know" – Jordan Davis; Dir. Stephen Kinigopoulos, Alexa Stone; "Tennessee Orange" – Megan Moroney; Dir. Jason Lester
Music Event of the Year
"Save Me" – Jelly Roll (with Lainey Wilson); "Can't Break Up Now" – Old Dominion (feat. Megan Moroney); "Different 'Round Here" – Riley Green and Luke Combs; "I Remember Everything" – Zach Bryan (featt. Kacey Musgraves); "Man Made a Bar" – Morgan Wallen (feat. Eric Church)

== Performers ==
Performer(s)	Song
Lainey Wilson	"God Blessed Texas" "Hang Tight Honey"
Jelly Roll	"Liar"
Kelsea Ballerini; Noah Kahan	"Mountain with a View" "Stick Season"
Tigirlily Gold	"I Tried a Ring On"
Cody Johnson	"Dirt Cheap"
Miranda Lambert	"Wranglers"
Kane Brown	"Georgia on My Mind"
Thomas Rhett	"Beautiful as You"
Blake Shelton; Gwen Stefani	"Purple Irises"
Jason Aldean	Tribute to Toby Keith "Should've Been a Cowboy"
Chris Stapleton; Dua Lipa	"Think I'm in Love with You"
Post Malone	"Never Love You Again" "I Had Some Help"
Parker McCollum	"Burn It Down"
Nate Smith; Avril Lavigne	"Bulletproof"
Reba McEntire	"I Can't"

== Presenters ==
- Randy Travis and Clay Walker – presented Song of the Year
- Richard Sherman and Charissa Thompson – presented Duo of the Year
- Little Big Town – introduced Tigirlily Gold
- Tyler Cameron – presented Group of the Year
- Ashley McBryde and Noah Reid – presented Single of the Year
- The War and Treaty – introduced Kane Brown
- Jordan Davis and Carín León – presented Male Artist of the Year
- Blake Shelton – introduced the Tribute to Toby Keith
- Reba McEntire – presented Female Artist of the Year
- Bobby Bones – recognized ACM Radio Award winners
- Scotty McCreery – presented Music Event of the Year
- Rozene and Dion Pride (wife and son of Charley Pride) – presented Album of the Year
- Breland – introduced Nate Smith and Avril Lavigne
- Alabama – presented Entertainer of the Year
