= Academy of Country Music Award for Album of the Year =

Annual US country music award

- Country: United States
- Presented by: Academy of Country Music
- First award: 1968
- Currently held by: Parker McCollum (Parker McCollum)

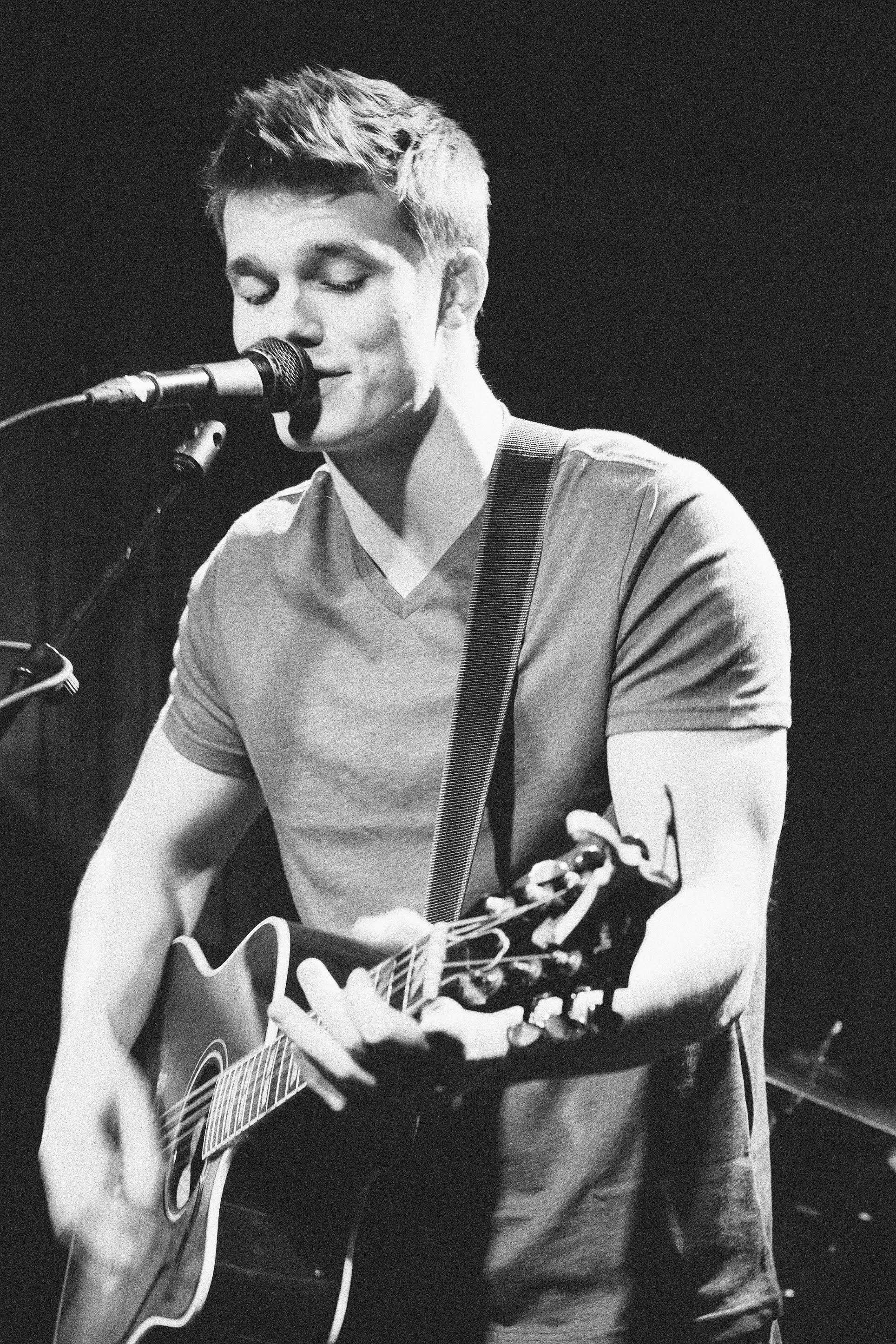
The reigning winner, Parker McCollum.

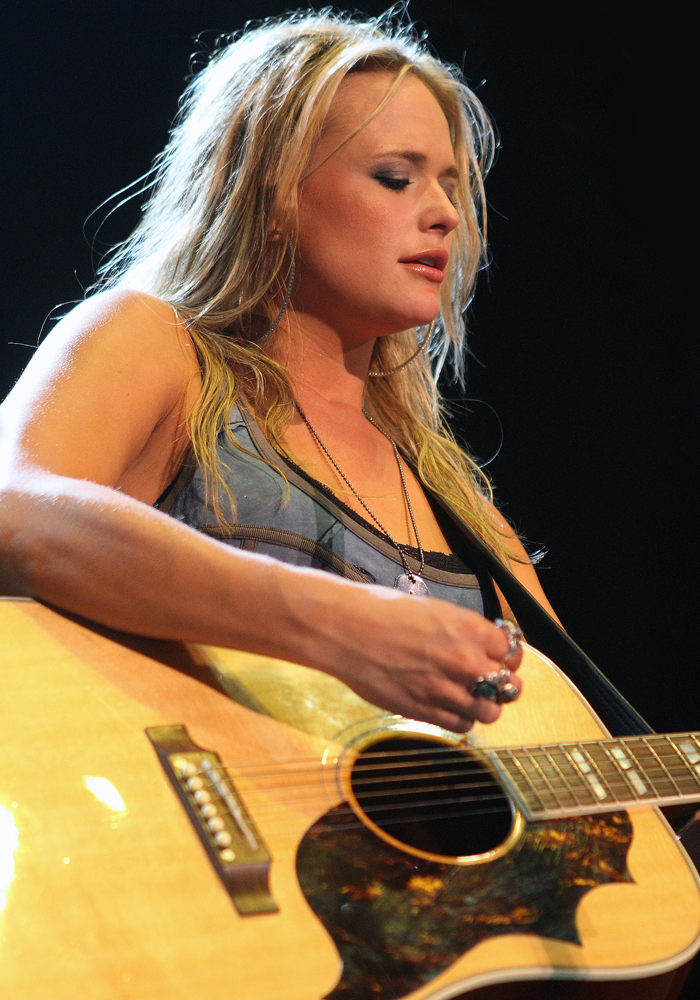
Miranda Lambert, the most decorated artist for Album of the Year in ACM history with 5 wins.

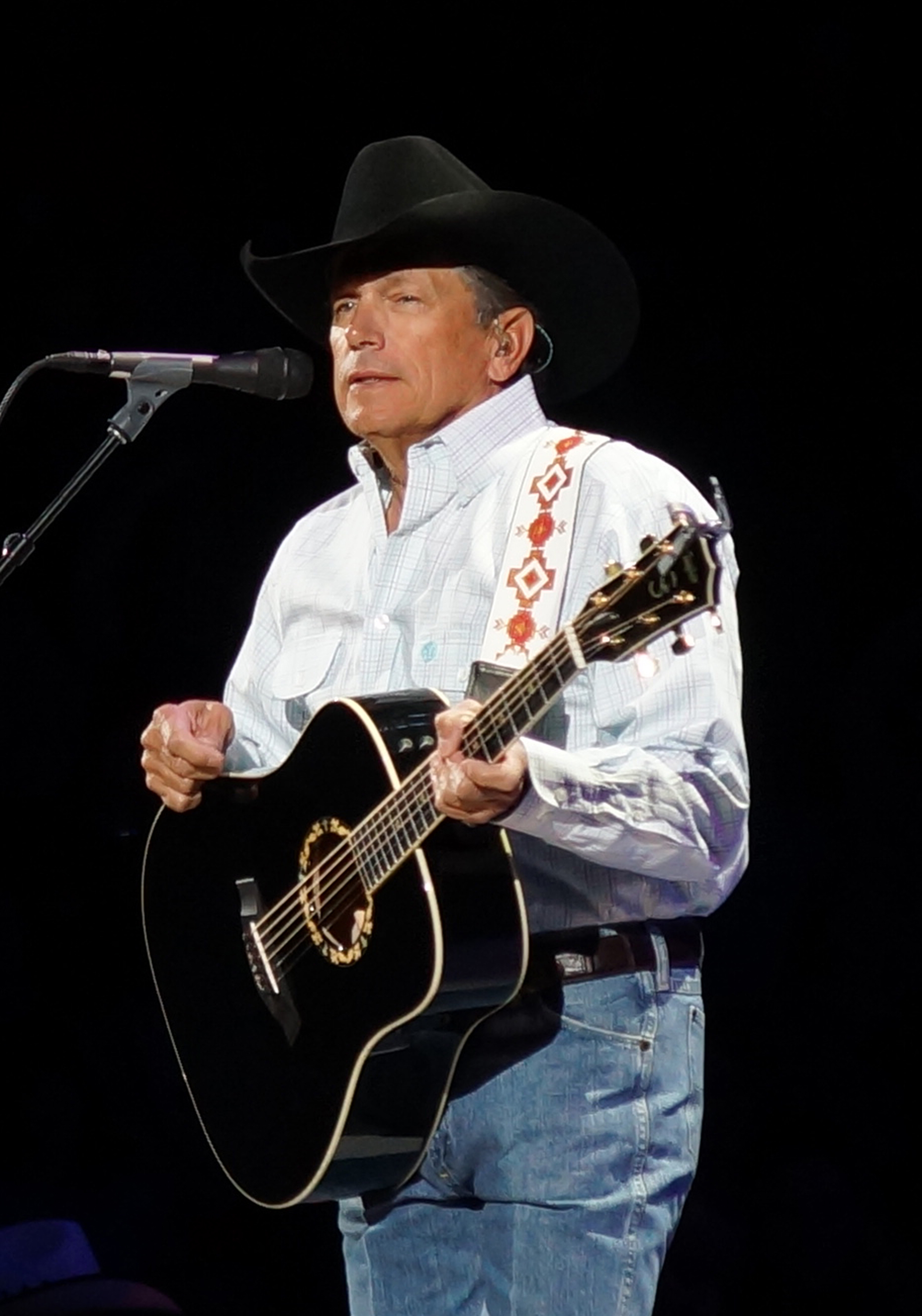
George Strait, the most nominated artist in ACM history with 12 nominations.

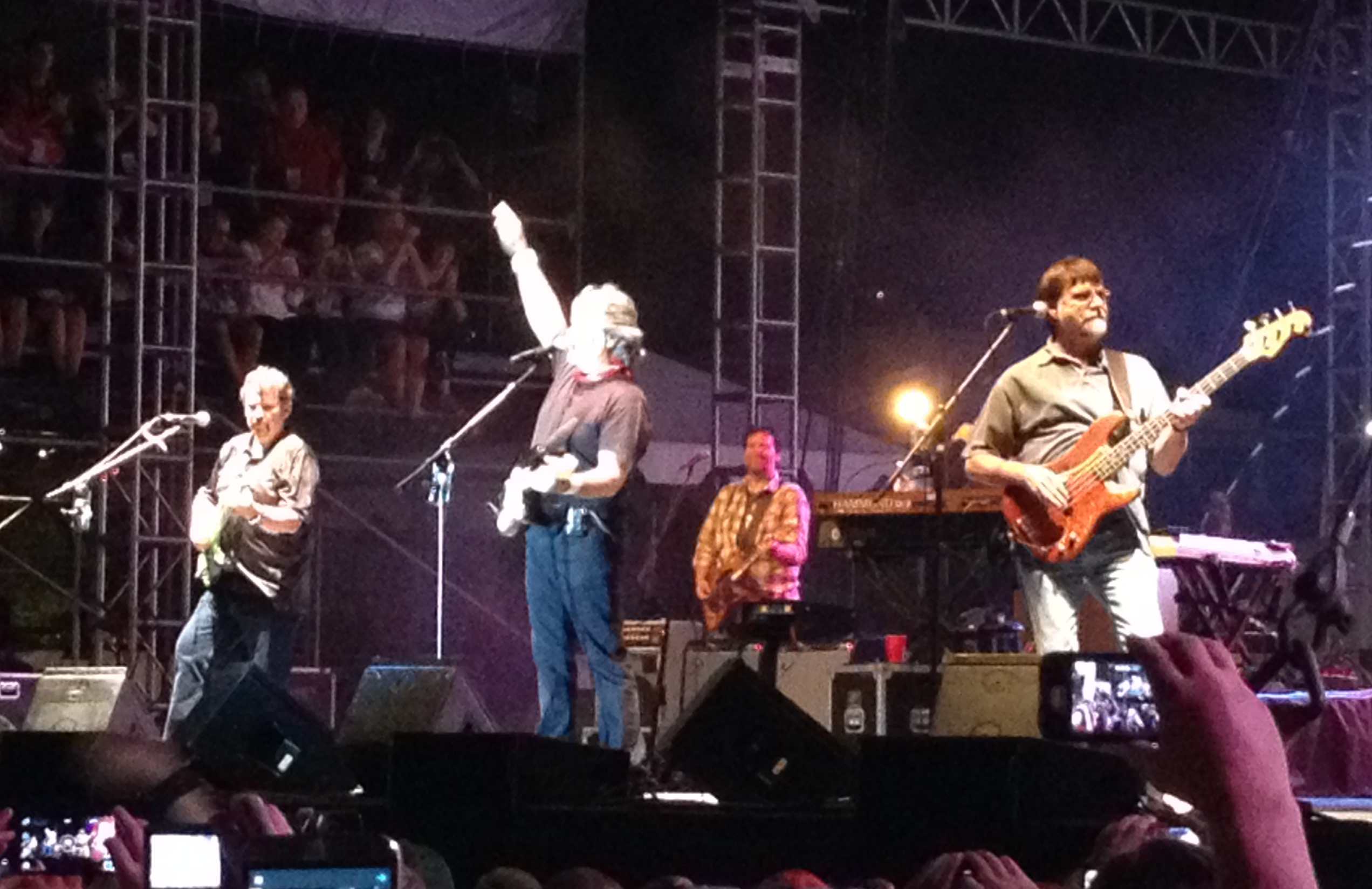
Alabama, the most decorated and nominated vocal group in ACM history.

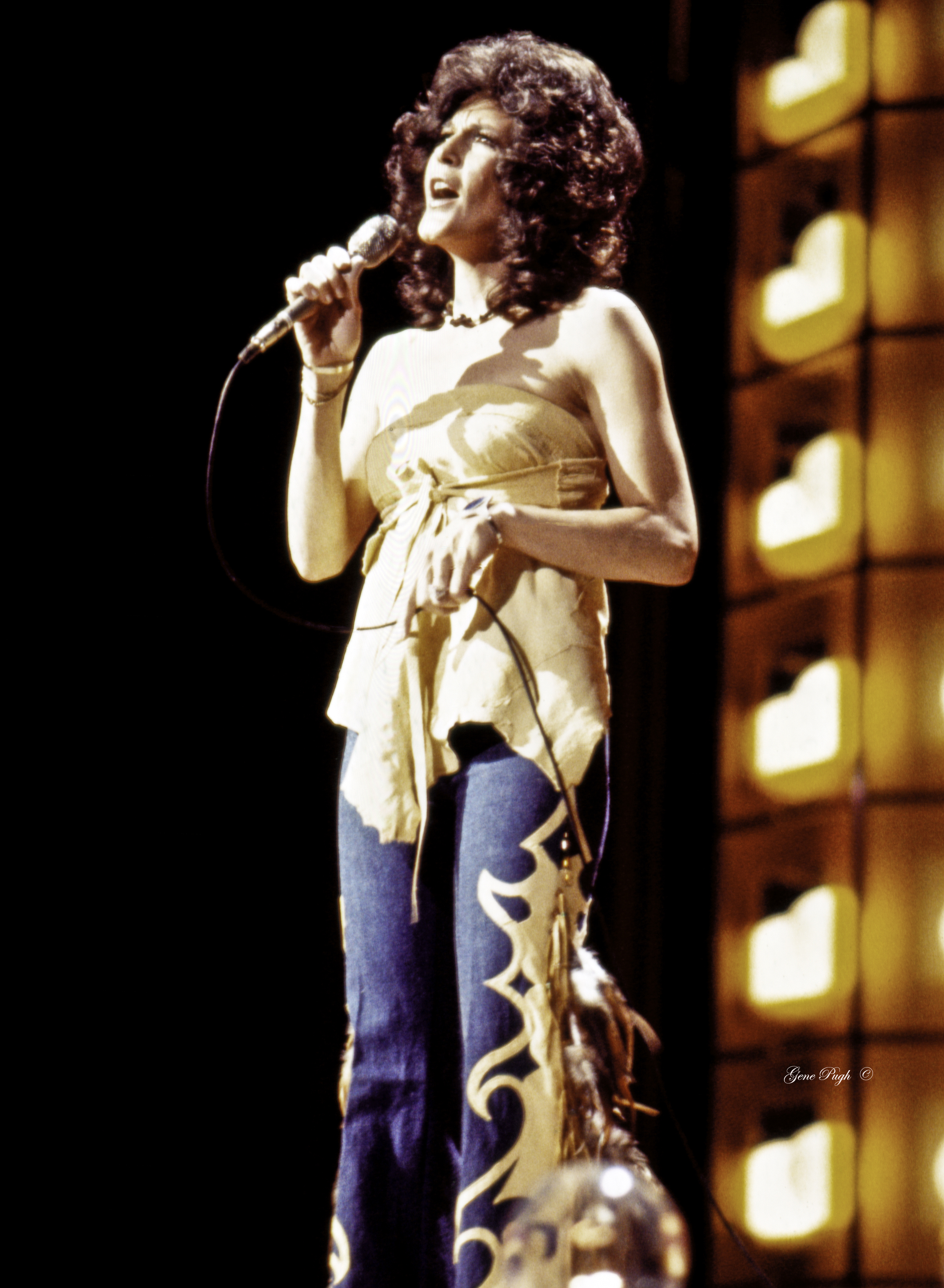
Donna Fargo, the first solo female artist to win Album of the Year.

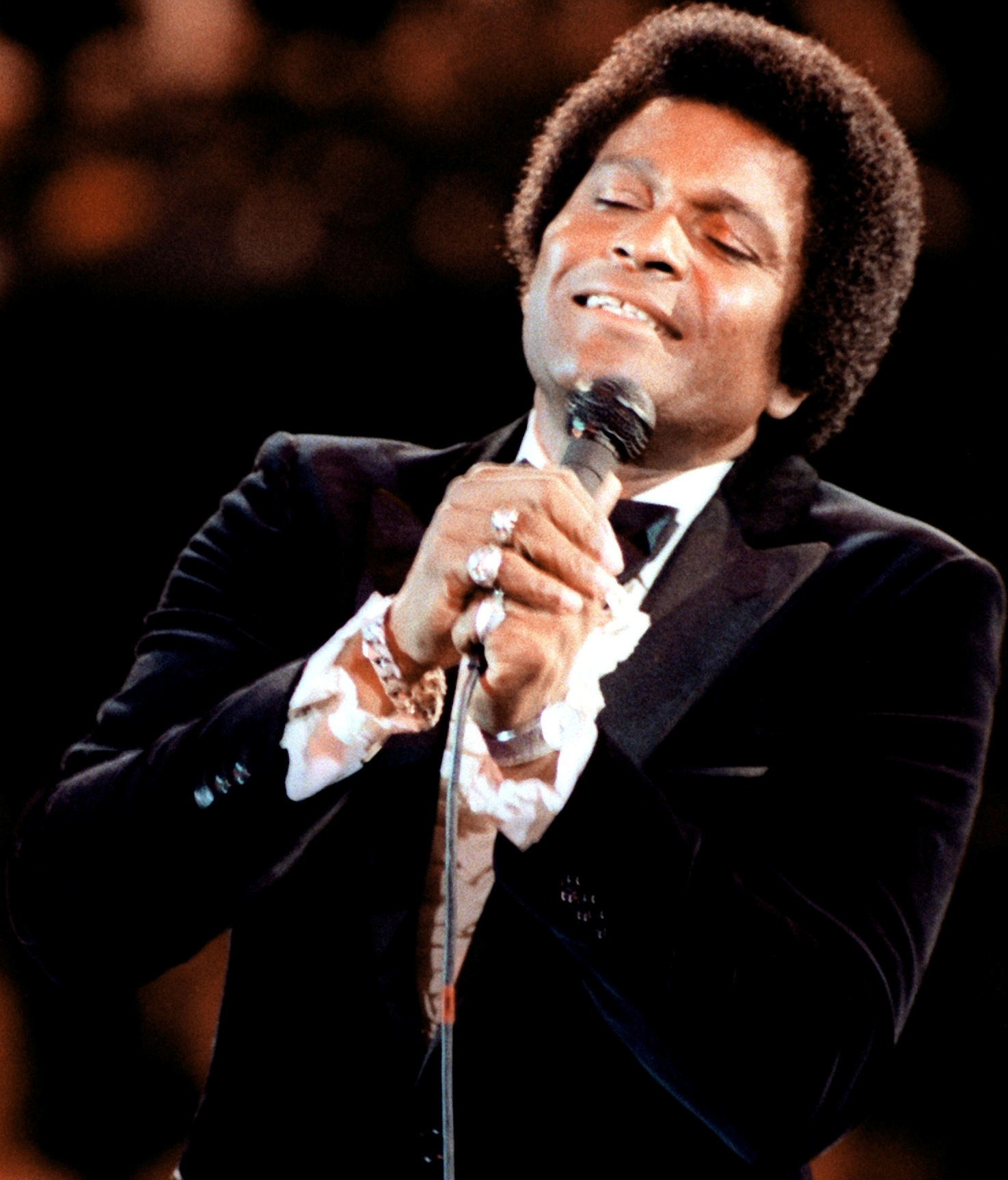
Charley Pride, the first black artist nominated for Album of the Year.

The Academy of Country Music Award for Album of the Year is a competitive category presented at the Academy of Country Music Awards. The following is the list of winners, with the year representing the nominated work.

== Recipients ==
Year	Winner	Artist(s)	Nominees
2026	Parker McCollum	Parker McCollum	Ain’t In It For My Health — Zach Top; Cherry Valley — Carter Faith; Don't Mind If I Do (Deluxe) — Riley Green; I’m the Problem — Morgan Wallen
2025	Whirlwind	Lainey Wilson	Am I Okay? (I’ll Be Fine) — Megan Moroney; Beautifully Broken — Jelly Roll; Cold Beer & Country Music — Zach Top; F-1 Trillion — Post Malone
2024	Higher	Chris Stapleton	Gettin' Old – Luke Combs; Leather – Cody Johnson; One Thing at a Time – Morgan Wallen; Rolling Up the Welcome Mat (For Good) – Kelsea Ballerini
2023	Bell Bottom Country	Lainey Wilson	Ashley McBryde Presents: Lindeville — Ashley McBryde; Growin' Up — Luke Combs; Mr. Saturday Night — Jon Pardi; Palomino — Miranda Lambert
2022	Dangerous: The Double Album	Morgan Wallen	29: Written in Stone — Carly Pearce; Country Again: Side A — Thomas Rhett; Famous Friends — Chris Young; The Marfa Tapes — Miranda Lambert, Jack Ingram, Jon Randall
2021	Starting Over	Chris Stapleton	Born Here Live Here Die Here — Luke Bryan; Mixtape Vol. 1 — Kane Brown; Never Will — Ashley McBryde; Skeletons — Brothers Osborne
2020	What You See Is What You Get	Luke Combs	Center Point Road — Thomas Rhett; Girl — Maren Morris; Heartache Medication — Jon Pardi; Wildcard — Miranda Lambert
2019	Golden Hour	Kacey Musgraves	Dan + Shay — Dan + Shay; Desperate Man — Eric Church; From A Room: Volume 2 — Chris Stapleton; The Mountain — Dierks Bentley
2018	From A Room: Volume 1	Chris Stapleton	The Breaker — Little Big Town; California Sunrise — Jon Pardi; Happy Endings — Old Dominion; Life Changes — Thomas Rhett
2017	The Weight of These Wings	Miranda Lambert	Black — Dierks Bentley; Dig Your Roots — Florida Georgia Line; Hero - Maren Morris; Ripcord — Keith Urban
2016	Traveller	Chris Stapleton	I'm Comin' Over — Chris Young; Montevallo — Sam Hunt; Mr. Misunderstood — Eric Church; Tangled Up — Thomas Rhett
2015	Platinum	Miranda Lambert	Old Boots, New Dirt — Jason Aldean; Pain Killer — Little Big Town; Riser — Dierks Bentley; The Outsiders — Eric Church
2014	Same Trailer Different Park	Kacey Musgraves	Based on a True Story... — Blake Shelton; Crash My Party — Luke Bryan; Here's to the Good Times — Florida Georgia Line; Two Lanes of Freedom — Tim McGraw
2013	Chief	Eric Church	Blown Away — Carrie Underwood; Red — Taylor Swift; Tailgates & Tanlines — Luke Bryan; Tornado — Little Big Town
2012	Four the Record	Miranda Lambert	Chief — Eric Church; Hemingway’s Whiskey — Kenny Chesney; My Kinda Party — Jason Aldean; Own the Night — Lady Antebellum
2011	Need You Now	Lady Antebellum	Hemingway’s Whiskey — Kenny Chesney; The Guitar Song — Jamey Johnson; Speak Now — Taylor Swift; Up On The Ridge — Dierks Bentley; You Get What You Give — Zac Brown Band
2010	Revolution	Miranda Lambert	American Saturday Night — Brad Paisley; Lady Antebellum — Lady Antebellum; Play On — Carrie Underwood; The Foundation — Zac Brown Band
2009	Fearless	Taylor Swift	That Lonesome Song — Jamey Johnson; Back When I Knew It All — Montgomery Gentry; Troubadour — George Strait; Carnival Ride — Carrie Underwood
2008	Crazy Ex-Girlfriend	Miranda Lambert	5th Gear — Brad Paisley; Just Who I Am: Poets & Pirates — Kenny Chesney; If You’re Going Through Hell — Rodney Atkins; Taylor Swift — Taylor Swift
2007	Some Hearts	Carrie Underwood	Hillbilly Deluxe — Brooks & Dunn; It Just Comes Natural — George Strait; Me and My Gang — Rascal Flatts; These Days — Vince Gill
2006	Time Well Wasted	Brad Paisley	Feels Like Today — Rascal Flatts; There’s More Where That Came From — Lee Ann Womack; Tough All Over — Gary Allan; Twice the Speed of Life — Sugarland
2005	Be Here	Keith Urban	Here For The Party — Gretchen Wilson; Live Like You Were Dying — Tim McGraw; Restless — Sara Evans; When The Sun Goes Down — Kenny Chesney
2004	Shock'n Y'all	Toby Keith	Honkytonkville — George Strait; Martina — Martina McBride; Mud On the Tires — Brad Paisley; Red Dirt Road — Brooks & Dunn
2003	Drive	Alan Jackson	Home — Dixie Chicks; No Shoes, No Shirt, No Problems — Kenny Chesney; On a Mission — Trick Pony; Unleashed — Toby Keith
2002	O Brother, Where Art Thou?	Various Artists	Down the Road I Go — Travis Tritt; Pull My Chain — Toby Keith; Set This Circus Down — Tim McGraw; Steers & Stripes — Brooks & Dunn
2001	How Do You Like Me Now?!	Toby Keith	American III: Solitary Man — Johnny Cash; I Hope You Dance — Lee Ann Womack; One Voice — Billy Gilman; Who Needs Pictures — Brad Paisley
2000	Fly	Dixie Chicks	A Place In The Sun — Tim McGraw; Breathe — Faith Hill; Cold Hard Truth — George Jones; Ride With Bob — Asleep At the Wheel
1999	Wide Open Spaces	Dixie Chicks	I'm Alright — Jo Dee Messina; Double Live — Garth Brooks; Faith — Faith Hill; One Step at a Time — George Strait
1998	Carrying Your Love With Me	George Strait	Come On Over — Shania Twain; Everywhere — Tim McGraw; Long Stretch Of Lonesome — Patty Loveless; Sevens — Garth Brooks
1997	Blue Clear Sky	George Strait	Blue — LeAnn Rimes; Borderline — Brooks & Dunn; The Trouble With The Truth — Patty Loveless; Time Marches On — Tracy Lawrence
1996	The Woman In Me	Shania Twain	All I Want — Tim McGraw; Lead On — George Strait; Waitin' On Sundown — Brooks & Dunn; When Fallen Angels Fly — Patty Loveless
1995	Not A Moment Too Soon	Tim McGraw	In Pieces — Garth Brooks; Stones in the Road — Mary Chapin Carpenter; When Love Finds You — Vince Gill; Who I Am — Alan Jackson
1994	A Lot About Livin' (And A Little 'Bout Love)	Alan Jackson	Common Thread: Songs of the Eagles — Various Artists; Hard Workin' Man — Brooks & Dunn; It Won't Be the Last — Billy Ray Cyrus; This Time — Sawyer Brown; I Still Believe in You — Vince Gill
1993	Brand New Man	Brooks & Dunn	Come On Come On — Mary-Chapin Carpenter; Some Gave All — Billy Ray Cyrus; The Chase — Garth Brooks; Wynonna — Wynonna
1992	Don't Rock the Jukebox	Alan Jackson	Backroads — Ricky Van Shelton; It's All About to Change — Travis Tritt; Ropin' the Wind — Garth Brooks
1991	No Fences	Garth Brooks	Pass It On Down — Alabama; Ricky Van Shelton III — Ricky Van Shelton; Here In The Real World — Alan Jackson; When I Call Your Name — Vince Gill
1990	Killin' Time	Clint Black	Diamonds & Dirt — Rodney Crowell; Old 8 x 10 — Randy Travis; Will The Circle Be Unbroken Vol II — Nitty Gritty Dirt Band; Willow In The Head — Kathy Mattea
1989	This Woman	K.T. Oslin	Buenos Noches From A Lonely Room — Dwight Yoakam; Chiseled In Stone — Vern Gosdin; If You Ain't Lovin' You Ain't Livin — George Strait; Loving Proof — Ricky Van Shelton
1988	Trio	Dolly Parton, Emmylou Harris and Linda Ronstadt	Always and Forever — Randy Travis; Born To Boogie — Hank Williams Jr.; Heart Land — The Judds; Ocean Front Property — George Strait
1987	Storms Of Life	Randy Travis	7 — George Strait; Guitars, Cadillac's Etc., Etc. — Dwight Yoakam; Live In London — Ricky Skaggs; Rockin' With The Rhythm — The Judds
1986	Does Fort Worth Ever Cross Your Mind	George Strait	Five-O — Hank Williams Jr.; Forty Hour Week — Alabama; Highwayman — The Highwaymen; Why Not Me — The Judds
1985	Roll On	Alabama	Don't Cheat in Our Hometown — Ricky Skaggs; Don't Make It Easy On Me — Earl Thomas Conley; Man Of Steel — Hank Williams Jr.; Right Or Wrong — George Strait
1984	The Closer You Get	Alabama	Going Where The Lonely Go — Merle Haggard; Highways & Heartaches — Ricky Skaggs; Poncho & Lefty — Merle Haggard and Willie Nelson; Wild & Blue — John Anderson
1983	Always on My Mind	Willie Nelson	Listen to the Radio — Don Williams; Love Will Turn You Around — Kenny Rogers; Mountain Music — Alabama; Waitin' For The Sun To Shine — Ricky Skaggs
1982	Feels So Right	Alabama	9 to 5 And Odd Jobs — Dolly Parton; Fancy Free — The Oak Ridge Boys; Seven Year Ache — Rosanne Cash; Still the Same Ole Me — George Jones
1981	Urban Cowboy	Various Artists	Greatest Hits — Kenny Rogers; I Believe In You — Don Williams; There's A Little Bit Of Hank In Me — Charley Pride; Coal Miner's Daughter — Loretta Lynn
1980	Straight Ahead	Larry Gatlin	Blue Kentucky Girl — Emmylou Harris; Greatest Hits — Waylon Jennings; Kenny — Kenny Rogers; Willie Sings Kristofferson — Willie Nelson
1979	Y'all Come Back Saloon	The Oak Ridge Boys	Everytime Two Fools Collide — Kenny Rogers and Dottie West; It Was Almost Like A Song — Ronnie Milsap; Let's Keep It That Way — Anne Murray; Stardust — Willie Nelson
1978	Kenny Rogers	Kenny Rogers	Conway Twitty's Greatest Hits Vol. II — Conway Twitty; Here You Come Again — Dolly Parton; Moody Blue — Elvis Presley; Ol' Waylon — Waylon Jennings
1977	Gilley's Smoking	Mickey Gilley	El Paso City — Marty Robbins; Now & Then — Conway Twitty; Somebody Somewhere — Loretta Lynn; Wanted! The Outlaws — Jessie Colter, Tom Paul Glaser, Waylon Jennings and Willie Nelson
1976	Feelings	Conway Twitty and Loretta Lynn	Before the Next Teardrop Falls — Freddy Fender; Keep Movin On — Merle Haggard; Red Headed Stranger — Willie Nelson; Rhinestone Cowboy — Glen Campbell
1975	Back Home Again	John Denver	Country Bumpkin — Cal Smith; For The Last Time — Bob Wills; Hags 30th Album — Merle Haggard; They Don't Make 'Em Like My Daddy — Loretta Lynn
1974	Behind Closed Doors	Charlie Rich	I Love Dixie Blues — Merle Haggard; Introducing Johnny Rodriguez — Johnny Rodriguez; Louisiana Woman, Mississippi Man — Conway Twitty and Loretta Lynn; Love is the Foundation — Loretta Lynn
1973	The Happiest Girl in the Whole U.S.A.	Donna Fargo	Baby Don't Get Hooked On Me — Mac Davis; Best of the Best — Merle Haggard; Bless Your Heart — Freddie Hart; It's Not Love (But It's Not Bad) — Merle Haggard; Let Me Tell You About a Song — Merle Haggard
1972	Easy Loving	Freddie Hart	Charley Pride Sings Heart Songs — Charley Pride; I Won't Mention It Again — Ray Price; Someday We'll Look Back — Merle Haggard; The Hag — Merle Haggard
1971	For the Good Times	Ray Price	Charley Pride's 10th Album — Charley Pride; Fightin' Side of Me — Merle Haggard; Glen Campbell's Goodtime Album — Glen Campbell; Tribute to Best Damn Fiddle Player — Merle Haggard
1970	Okie From Muskogee	Merle Haggard	Best Of Charley Pride — Charley Pride; Glen Campbell Live — Glen Campbell; Johnny Cash at Folsom Prison — Johnny Cash; Tammy Wynette's Greatest Hits — Tammy Wynette
1969	Glen Campbell & Bobbie Gentry	Glen Campbell and Bobbie Gentry	Best Of Buck Owens — Buck Owens; Mama Tried — Merle Haggard; The Best of Merle Haggard — Merle Haggard; Wichita Lineman — Glen Campbell
1968	Gentle On My Mind	Glen Campbell	Branded Man — Merle Haggard; Burning Bridges — Glen Campbell; I'm A Lonesome Fugitive — Merle Haggard; It's Such A Pretty World Today - Wynn Stewart

== Category records ==
=== Wins ===
- Male artist with most wins — George Strait, Chris Stapleton (3).
- Female artist with most wins — Miranda Lambert (5).
- Group with most wins — Alabama (3).
- Duo with the most wins — Brooks & Dunn, Conway Twitty and Loretta Lynn, Glen Campbell and Bobbie Gentry (1).

=== Nominations ===
- Male artist with most nominations — George Strait (12).
- Female artist with most nominations — Miranda Lambert (7).
- Group with most nominations — Alabama (6).
- Duo with the most nominations — Brooks & Dunn (7).

== See also ==
- Country Music Association Award for Album of the Year
