= No Caller ID =

Promotional single by Megan Moroney

from the album Am I Okay?
- Released: January 19, 2024
- Recorded: 2023
- Genre: Country
- Length: 3:28
- Label: Sony; Columbia
- Songwriters: Jessi Alexander; Jessie Jo Dillon; Connie Harrington; Megan Moroney
- Producer: Kristian Bush

"No Caller ID" is a song by American country music singer Megan Moroney. It was released on January 19, 2024, through Sony Music and Columbia Records as the lead promotional single from her second studio album, Am I Okay?. It was written by Moroney alongside Jessi Alexander, Jessie Jo Dillon, and Connie Harrington, and was produced by Kristian Bush. The song was Moroney's first to chart in New Zealand, and has been certified platinum by the Recording Industry Association of America. The song details the story of a woman trying to move on from a relationship that has ended while her ex tries their best to stick around and hamper any progress made.

== Background ==
Prior to the release of the song, Moroney teased it by posting a video of her performing a short snippet of it on her TikTok account in July 2023. This clip subsequently went viral, leading her to begin including the song in her live sets. On January 11, 2025, it was announced that "No Caller ID" would be released the following week on January 19. In a statement accompanying the release of the song, Moroney explained “I played this song on The Lucky Tour last fall, and I could tell my fans wanted me to release it. It feels like this song has helped my fans as much as it has helped me. By the end, there is a lot of strength and growth that I’m proud of. I am really excited for this one!”

Moroney officially announced the song's parent album, Am I Okay? on May 3, 2024, along with the promotional single "Indifferent". On the project, "No Caller ID" features as the third track.

Moroney performed the song live on The Tonight Show Starring Jimmy Fallon on June 5, 2024.

== Composition ==
"No Caller ID" is a country ballad that "retains the enchantingly hazy, stripped-back feel" reminiscent of songs from her debt album Lucky, such as "Georgia Girl" and "Mustang Or Me", and sees Moroney re-team with producer Kristian Bush. Sonically, it features "sweet, intricate instrumentation", including "euphonic" drums, and evocative, "yearning steel" guitar, paired with "easy-going acoustic guitar", which juxtaposes with the "melancholic edge of the lyricism".

Lyrically, the song tells the story of a woman who has recently gotten over a toxic ex and moved onto a new, healthier relationship. As Moroney details how much progress she is made, highlighted by positive therapy sessions and her friends no longer feeling the need to constantly check up on her, her ex begins contacting her late at night from an unknown number in an attempt to exploit her insecurities and rekindle the flame. As the song continues, Moroney theorizes that her ex is only attempting to get in touch because he is jealous that she is happy without him and because he is drunk and lonely. Despite feeling torn over whether to answer the phone, she ultimately decides to just "let it ring", declaring that he doesn't have the power to hurt her anymore.

== Reception ==
The song was nominated for The Female Song of 2024 award at the 2024 People's Choice Country Awards.

== Credits and personnel ==
Credits adapted from Tidal.

- Drew Bollman - mixing
- Brandon Bush - keyboards
- Kristian Bush - producer, acoustic guitar, mandolin
- Luke Campolieta - engineering, recording
- Nathan Dantzler - mastering
- Mike "Frog" Griffith - co-ordination
- Travis McNabb - drums, percussion
- Buckley Miller - recording
- Megan Moroney - vocals
- Justin Niebank - mixing
- Ted Pecchio - bass
- Justin Schipper - electric guitar, steel guitar
- Benji Shanks - acoustic guitar, electric guitar
- Harrison Tate - engineering
- Michael Walter - engineering

== Charts ==
Weekly chart performance for "No Caller ID"
Chart (2024)	Peak position
Canada Hot 100 (Billboard)	99
New Zealand Hot Singles (RMNZ)	27
US Billboard Hot 100	58
US Hot Country Songs (Billboard)	13

== Certifications ==
Certifications for "No Caller ID"
Region	Certification	Certified units/sales
Canada (Music Canada)	Gold	40,000^{‡}
United States (RIAA)	Platinum	1,000,000^{‡}
^{‡} Sales+streaming figures based on certification alone.
