= I'm Not Pretty (Megan Moroney song) =

Single by Megan Moroney

from the album Lucky
- Released: August 7, 2023
- Genre: Country
- Length: 3:01
- Label: Arista Nashville; Columbia Nashville
- Songwriters: Megan Moroney; Ben Williams; MacKenzie Carpenter; Micah Carpenter
- Producer: Kristian Bush

Megan Moroney singles chronology
"Tennessee Orange" (2022)	"I'm Not Pretty" (2023)	"Can't Break Up Now" (2023)

"I'm Not Pretty" is a song by American country music singer Megan Moroney. The song was released in August 2023 as the second single from her debut studio album, Lucky. Moroney wrote the song with Ben Williams, MacKenzie Carpenter, and Micah Carpenter.

== Content ==
Moroney was inspired to write the song based on a real-life situation in which an ex's new girlfriend liked one of her old Instagram photos, leading her to contemplate that the girl was superficially sizing up her appearance, though the singer said that ultimately the song is "not meant to be taken too seriously" and intended as "an anthem for the girls".

== Music video ==
The music video for "I'm Not Pretty" premiered on August 9, 2023. In it, Moroney and some of her real-life friends play two cohorts of girls—the "nice girls" (represented with blonde wigs and pink outfits) and the "mean girls" (represented as brunettes with dark clothing)—with the message that "the nice girls always win".

== Charts ==
=== Weekly charts ===
Weekly chart performance for "I'm Not Pretty"
Chart (2023–2024)	Peak position
Canada Country (Billboard)	35
UK Country Airplay (Radiomonitor)	17
US Bubbling Under Hot 100 (Billboard)	14
US Country Airplay (Billboard)	14
US Hot Country Songs (Billboard)	32

=== Year-end charts ===
2024 year-end chart performance for "I'm Not Pretty"
Chart (2024)	Position
US Country Airplay (Billboard)	45
US Hot Country Songs (Billboard)	48

== Certifications ==
Certifications for "I'm Not Pretty"
Region	Certification	Certified units/sales
Canada (Music Canada)	Platinum	80,000^{‡}
United States (RIAA)	2× Platinum	2,000,000^{‡}
^{‡} Sales+streaming figures based on certification alone.
