= Blue Christmas...Duh =

2024 EP by Megan Moroney

EP by Megan Moroney
- Released: November 1, 2024
- Length: 10:06
- Label: Sony
- Producer: Kristian Bush

Megan Moroney chronology
Am I Okay? (2024)	Blue Christmas...Duh (2024)	Cloud 9 (2026)

Blue Christmas...Duh is the second extended play (EP) and first Christmas themed record by American singer Megan Moroney. It was released through Sony on November 1, 2024.

== Background ==
Moroney announced Blue Christmas...Duh on October 31, 2024, with a surprise release the next day. The extended play features two original songs, "All I Want for Christmas is a Cowboy" and "Christmas Morning", written by Moroney, Ben Williams, Mackenzie Carpenter, and Micah Carpenter, as well as a cover of "Blue Christmas". All three tracks were produced by Kristian Bush.

== Critical reception ==
Professional ratings
Review scores
Source	Rating
365 Days of Inspiring Media	4.5/5 stars
Album of the Year	73/100
Sound in Review	4/5 stars

Clementine Behelfer of Three Penny Press called the EP another no-skip project from Moroney, while also stating her music is "good-quality and true-to-her-roots songs that hit the spot every time." Amity Hereweard from Chalked Up Reviews stated Moroney created a glimpse of the holiday season while experiencing a full spectrum of emotions. They further state she "showcases the versatility of her talent and the depths of her emotional expression."

== Track listing ==
Blue Christmas...Duh track listing
No.	Title	Writer(s)	Producer(s)	Length
1.	"All I Want for Christmas is a Cowboy"	Megan Moroney; Ben Williams; Mackenzie Carpenter; Micah Carpenter	Kristian Bush	3:17
2.	"Christmas Morning"	Moroney; Williams; Ma. Carpenter; Mi. Carpenter	Bush	4:18
3.	"Blue Christmas"	Billy Hayes; Jay W. Johnson	Bush	2:31
Total length:				10:06

== Personnel ==
Credits adapted from Tidal.

=== Musicians ===
- Megan Moroney – lead vocals (all tracks), background vocals (1–2)
- Justin Schipper – acoustic guitar (1), steel guitar (all tracks)
- Ted Pecchio – bass (all tracks)
- Travis McNabb – drums (all tracks), percussion (all tracks)
- John Osbourne – electric guitar (all tracks)
- Larry Franklin – fiddle (1)
- Brandon Bush – organ (3), piano (all tracks), programming (1), synthesizer (2)
- Justin Niebank – programming (all tracks)
- Kristian Bush – acoustic guitar (2), mandolin (2)

=== Technical ===
- Nathan Dantzler – mastering (all tracks)
- Drew Bollman – mixing engineer (all tracks), recording engineer (all tracks)
- Justin Niebank – mixing engineer (all tracks)
- Luke Campolieta – recording engineer (all tracks), vocal engineer (1–2)
- Maddie Harmon – recording engineer (1–2)
- Harrison Tate – assistant engineer (all tracks)
- Jordan Reed – assistant engineer (all tracks)
