= Cherry Valley (album) =

Studio album by Carter Faith
- Released: October 3, 2025
- Recorded: 2024–25
- Genre: Country
- Length: 53:37
- Label: MCA Nashville
- Producer: Tofer Brown

Singles from Cherry Valley
- 1. "If I Had Never Lost My Mind..." Released: February 21, 2025; 2. "Grudge" Released: April 11, 2025; 3. "Sex, Drugs & Country Music" Released: June 27, 2025; 4. "Bar Star" Released: July 25, 2025; 5. "Arrows (Die For That Man)" Released: September 5, 2025

Cherry Valley Forever
- 2026 reissue

Singles from Cherry Valley Forever
- 1. "Ain't Over Me Yet" Released: May 15, 2026; 2. "Nothin' Better To Do" Released: June 26, 2026

Cherry Valley is the debut studio album by American country music singer-songwriter Carter Faith. It was produced by Tofer Brown and released on October 3, 2025, via MCA Nashville. The project's title references a fictional place that signifies Faith's creative home, and was inspired by a road sign she saw while on tour. The songs span Faith’s journey from her North Carolina hometown to Nashville. Cherry Valley was featured on several "best of 2025" lists. It was nominated for Album of the Year at the 61st Academy of Country Music Awards, making Faith the first artist in over ten years to be nominated for the award with their debut album (following Chris Stapleton's Traveller in 2015).

== Background ==
Discussing the title, Faith expressed that "Cherry Valley" is a town that exists in her imagination where she could process her emotions and turn them into songs that were primarily inspired by the work of Lana Del Rey, Kacey Musgraves, and Taylor Swift. Speaking on her songwriting process, Faith stated, "I would write songs, and some of them would live in Cherry Valley and some of them didn’t, it was just this fantastical dreamland that I created in my head, and I wanted my songs to live in that world too. I love the drama. I wanted them all to feel like they could fit in that very weird, Alice in Wonderland world." In an interview with Rolling Stone, she selected "Six String", "Misery Loves Company", "Betty", "Changed", and "Sails" as some of her favorite tracks from the album.

Faith announced the album on June 27, 2025, with an accompanying statement.

"Cherry Valley means everything to me. Every time I have slipped into a dark place (which I have a propensity for), this album has brought me out of it. I know that I wrote the songs but they still carry reminders for me every day when I relisten. Some of the songs have even transformed for me and mean something different now. The world of Cherry Valley has been a safe and freeing place for me and everyone who has worked so hard on this record. I have truly created this album with my best friends, which feels surreal. It feels like it belongs to all of us, because it does."

— Faith, describing the album concept, via MusicRow

== Promotion and release ==
=== Singles ===
"If I Had Never Lost My Mind..." was released as the album lead single on February 21, 2025. It was followed by a second single titled, "Grudge" which was released on April 11, 2025. The album third single "Sex, Drugs & Country Music" was released on June 27, 2025, the same day of the album announcement.

A fourth single, "Bar Star" was released on July 25, 2025. "Arrow (Die For That Man)" served as the album fifth and final single on September 5, 2025, before the album release.

=== Cherry Valley Forever ===
In 2026, Faith announced that the album will be reissued as Cherry Valley Forever, which will include five new songs, and its expected to be released on July 24, 2026. To promote the reissue two singles were released: "Ain't Over Me Yet" was released on May 15, 2026, and "Nothin' Better To Do" on June 26, 2026, the latter featuring country singer Wyatt Flores.

== Reception ==
Cherry Valley was ranked at number three on Billboard's "10 Best Country Albums of 2025" list, with Jessica Nicholson writing, "with her debut album Cherry Valley, gifted singer and songwriter Faith proves she more than knows her way around crafting a resplendent melody and an attention-grabbing lyric. She finds a soul-healing trinity in “Sex, Drugs and Country Music,” and then dives headfirst into honkytonk grit, capturing the essence of a heady romance with a small-town “Bar Star.” Elsewhere, she leans into elements of smooth countrypolitan, while her dynamic, polished vocal gives powerful ballads such as “If I Had Never Lost My Mind” an ethereal elegance. Overall, this marks an impressive, impactful debut that should give anyone plenty of faith in her career’s longevity".

=== Accolades ===
List of awards and nominations
Year	Award	Category	Result	Ref.
2026	Academy of Country Music Awards	Album of the Year	Nominated	
2027	Grammy Awards	Best Contemporary Country Album	Pending	

=== Year-end lists ===
Critics' rankings
Publication	Year	List	Rank	Ref.
Billboard	2025	The 10 Best Country Albums of 2025	3	
Country Universe	2025	The 40 Best Country Albums of 2025	2	
Holler.Country	2025	The Best Country Music Albums of 2025	4	
Rolling Stone	2025	The 25 Best Country and Americana Albums of 2025	2	
Rolling Stone	2025	The 100 Best Albums of 2025	18	
Stereogum	2025	The 10 Best Country Albums of 2025	Included	
Whiskey Riff	2025	The Best Debut Country Albums of 2025	1	
Whiskey Riff	2025	The 40 Best Country Albums of 2025	15	

== Track listing ==
Cherry Valley track listing
No.	Title	Writer(s)	Length
1.	"Cherry Valley"	Carter Faith; Ashley Monroe; Andrew Petroff	3:52
2.	"Sex, Drugs, & Country Music"	Faith; Tofer Brown; Lauren Hungate	3:37
3.	"Arrows (Die For That Man)"	Faith; Brown; Steph Jones	3:51
4.	"Bar Star"	Faith; Brown; Tyler Halverston; Aaron Raitiere	2:52
5.	"Betty"	Faith; Brown; Shane McAnally	2:54
6.	"Grudge"	Faith; Brown; Jones	3:15
7.	"Six String"	Faith; Brown; Hungate	4:06
8.	"If I Had Never Lost My Mind..."	Faith; Brown; Hungate; Jen Stegall	3:11
9.	"Misery Loves Company"	Faith; Brown; Hungate	3:16
10.	"Drink Up, Baby"	Faith; Brown; Amy Allen	3:27
11.	"Burn My Memory"	Faith; Jessi Alexander; Brock Berryhill; Jessie Jo Dillon	3:33
12.	"Sails"	Faith; Brown; Hungate	3:47
13.	"So I Sing"	Faith	3:52
14.	"Changed"	Faith; Monroe; Connie Harrington	4:35
15.	"Still A Lover"	Faith; Brown; Jones	3:23
Total length:			53:37

Cherry Valley Forever reissue
No.	Title	Writer(s)	Length
16.	"Dead Horse"	Faith; Brown; Hungate	3:26
17.	"Nothin' Better To Do" (with Wyatt Flores)	Faith; McAnally; Dillon; Vincent Mason; Tyler Johnson	3:02
18.	"Pearl Handled Pistol" (with Laci Kaye Booth and Baby Nova)	Faith; Dillon; Laci Kaye Booth; Chris Tompkins	4:19
19.	"If A Man's From Texas"	Faith; Brown; Hungate	2:51
20.	"Ain't Over Me Yet"	Faith; Hillary Lindsey; Steve Rusch	3:24
Total length:			57:00

== Personnel ==
Credits adapted from Tidal.

- Tofer Brown - production, piano, backing vocals, mellotron, bass, organ
- Alicia Enstrom - violin
- Carter Faith - vocals
- Billy Justineau - keyboard, mellotron, organ, wurlitzer, electric piano
- Annaleise Kowert - violin
- Betsy Lamb - viola
- Jordan Lehning - string arrangements
- Todd Lombardo - acoustic guitar, mandolin, banjo
- Tony Lucido - bass
- Rob Mcnelley - electric guitar
- Claire Indie Nunn - cello
- Russ Pahl - pedal steel
- Emily Rodgers - cello
- Aaron Sterling - drums, percussion
- Kristin Weber - violin

== Charts ==
Chart performance for Cherry Valley
Chart (2026)	Peak position
UK Americana Albums (Official Charts)	16
