= Am I Okay? (song) =

Single by Megan Moroney

from the album Am I Okay?
- Released: August 26, 2024
- Genre: Country
- Length: 3:55
- Label: Sony; Columbia
- Songwriters: Megan Moroney; Jessie Jo Dillon; Luke Laird
- Producer: Kristian Bush

Megan Moroney singles chronology
| "Can't Break Up Now" (2023) | "Am I Okay?" (2024) | "You Had to Be There" (2025) |

Music video
- "Am I Okay?" on YouTube

"Am I Okay?" is a song by American country music singer Megan Moroney. The song was released on August 26, 2024, as the only single from her second studio album of the same name. Moroney wrote the song with Jessie Jo Dillon and Luke Laird, and it was produced by Kristian Bush.

== Content ==
The titular and opening track from its parent album, "Am I Okay?" has a "poppy, tempo-driven beat" and is a lyrical pivot from Moroney's staple of "turbulent love songs", finding the singer instead comically checking her pulse and reaffirming that the unusual feelings she's experiencing are those of a "healthy romantic love". In an interview on Today's Country Radio with Kelleigh Bannen on Apple Music Country, Moroney said the song took inspiration from a past relationship: "People are probably going to think it's going to be a heart-wrenching song, but it's just not. It's like you're actually happy for once and you're asking yourself, 'Oh my God, am I okay?' And yeah, that's how I felt at one time. I think it lasted ... I think that when I had hope in a relationship with this guy, it lasted for a month or two until he showed [his] true colors. But we live and we learn. We got a good song out of it".

== Critical reception ==
Taste of Country placed "Am I Okay?" at number 10 on its list of the Top 40 Country Songs of 2024.

== Music video ==
The music video for "Am I Okay?" premiered on October 30, 2024, and was directed by Moroney and Alexandra Gavillet. The video won the award for Best Country Video at the 2025 MTV Video Music Awards.

== Chart performance ==
"Am I Okay?" debuted ahead of its release as a single at number 30 on the Billboard Hot Country Songs chart. It debuted at number 58 on the Billboard Country Airplay chart for the week dated August 31, 2024.

== Charts ==
=== Weekly charts ===
Weekly chart performance for "Am I Okay?"
| Chart (2024–2025) | Peak position |
|---|---|
| Australia Country Hot 50 (The Music) | 9 |
| Canada Hot 100 (Billboard) | 56 |
| Canada Country (Billboard) | 34 |
| US Billboard Hot 100 | 34 |
| US Country Airplay (Billboard) | 2 |
| US Hot Country Songs (Billboard) | 12 |

=== Year-end charts ===
2024 year-end chart performance for "Am I Okay?"
| Chart (2024) | Position |
|---|---|
| US Hot Country Songs (Billboard) | 77 |

2025 year-end chart performance for "Am I Okay?"
| Chart (2025) | Position |
|---|---|
| Canada Country (Billboard) | 95 |
| US Billboard Hot 100 | 66 |
| US Country Airplay (Billboard) | 14 |
| US Hot Country Songs (Billboard) | 19 |

== Certifications ==
Certifications for "Am I Okay?"
| Region | Certification | Certified units/sales |
|---|---|---|
| Canada (Music Canada) | Gold | 40,000^{‡} |
| United States (RIAA) | 2× Platinum | 2,000,000^{‡} |
^{‡} Sales+streaming figures based on certification alone.
