= 58th Academy of Country Music Awards =

US music awards ceremony in 2023

- Date: May 11, 2023
- Location: Ford Center at The Star, Frisco, Texas
- Hosted by: Dolly Parton; Garth Brooks

Highlights
- Most wins: Lainey Wilson (4)
- Most nominations: Kane Brown; HARDY; Lainey Wilson; (5 each)

Television/radio coverage
- Network: Prime Video
- Viewership: 7.7 million

The 58th Academy of Country Music Awards was held on May 11, 2023, in Frisco, Texas at the Ford Center at The Star. The ceremony was hosted by country music icons Dolly Parton and Garth Brooks.

== Background ==
On July 19, 2022, Prime Video and the ACM announced that the awards show would move to the Ford Center at The Star, a practice facility for the Dallas Cowboys, in Frisco, Texas. This marked the second time it was broadcast from the state since the 50th ceremony in 2015.

=== Category updates ===
On December 1, 2022, the academy announced it would be changing some of the awards categories. The Entertainer of the Year award would increase from five nominees to seven nominees. The Songwriter of the Year award would be separated into: Songwriter, described as an individual known predominantly as a songwriter and does not serve as the primary artist; and Artist —Songwriter, described as an individual known both as an artist and a songwriter who was the main recording artist on at least one song that charted in the top 20 on Billboard's Hot Country Songs or Mediabase Country charts during the eligibility period. Lastly, Video of the Year would be renamed as Visual Media of the Year, as to include other forms of media.

=== Hosts ===
On March 28, 2023, the ACM announced that country music legends Dolly Parton and Garth Brooks would host the ceremony. This ceremony marks Parton's second consecutive year, and third time hosting, whereas this was Brooks' first time hosting.

== Winners and nominees ==
Nominees were announced April 13, 2023 on The Bobby Bones Show, and the ACM website.

Entertainer of the Year	Album of the Year
Chris Stapleton; Jason Aldean; Kane Brown; Luke Combs; Miranda Lambert; Carrie Underwood; Morgan Wallen	Bell Bottom Country – Lainey Wilson; Ashley McBryde Presents: Lindeville – Ashley McBryde; Growin' Up – Luke Combs; Mr. Saturday Night – Jon Pardi; Palomino – Miranda Lambert
Female Artist of the Year	Male Artist of the Year
Lainey Wilson; Kelsea Ballerini; Miranda Lambert; Ashley McBryde; Carly Pearce	Morgan Wallen; Kane Brown; Luke Combs; Jordan Davis; Chris Stapleton
Group of the Year	Duo of the Year
Old Dominion; Lady A; Little Big Town; Midland; Zac Brown Band	Brothers Osborne; Brooks & Dunn; Dan + Shay; Maddie & Tae; The War and Treaty
Single of the Year	Song of the Year
"She Had Me at Heads Carolina" – Cole Swindell; "Heart Like a Truck" – Lainey Wilson; "Never Wanted to Be That Girl" – Carly Pearce and Ashley McBryde; "Thank God" – Kane Brown and Katelyn Brown; "'Til You Can't" – Cody Johnson	"She Had Me at Heads Carolina" – Ashley Gorley, Cole Swindell, Jesse Frasure, Mark D. Sanders, Thomas Rhett and Tim Nichols; "Sand in My Boots" – Ashley Gorley, Josh Osborne and Michael Hardy; "'Til You Can't" – Ben Stennis and Matt Rogers; "Wait in the Truck" – Hunter Phelps, Jordan Schmidt, Michael Hardy and Renee Blair; "You Should Probably Leave" – Ashley Gorley, Chris DuBois and Chris Stapleton
New Female Artist of the Year	New Male Artist of the Year
Hailey Whitters; Priscilla Block; Megan Moroney; Caitlyn Smith; Morgan Wade	Zach Bryan; Jackson Dean; Ernest; Dylan Scott; Nate Smith; Bailey Zimmerman
Artist-Songwriter of the Year	Songwriter of the Year
Hardy; Luke Combs; Ernest; Miranda Lambert; Morgan Wallen	Ashley Gorley; Nicolle Galyon; Chase McGill; Josh Osborne; Hunter Phelps
Music Event of the Year	Visual Media of the Year
"Wait in the Truck" – Hardy (feat. Lainey Wilson); "At the End of a Bar" – Chris Young with Mitchell Tenpenny; "She Had Me at Heads Carolina (Remix)" – Cole Swindell and Jo Dee Messina; "Thank God" – Kane Brown with Katelyn Brown; "Thinking ‘Bout You" – Dustin Lynch (feat. MacKenzie Porter)	"Wait in the Truck" – Hardy (feat. Lainey Wilson); Dir. Justin Clough; "Heartfirst" – Kelsea Ballerini; Dir. P Tracy; "She Had Me at Heads Carolina" – Cole Swindell; Dir. Spidey Smith; "Thank God" – Kane Brown with Katelyn Brown; Dir. Alex Alvga; "'Til You Can't" – Cody Johnson; Dir. Dustin Haney; "What He Didn't Do" – Carly Pearce; Dir. Alexa Campbell

== Performers ==
The first wave of performers were announced on April 30, 2023. On May 8, Ed Sheeran was announced as a performer. The full line-up was revealed on May 9, 2023. Morgan Wallen was originally set to perform on the show but had to cancel after he was placed on vocal rest by doctors.

Performer(s)	Song
Keith Urban	"Texas Time"
Cole Swindell; Jo Dee Messina	"She Had Me at Heads Carolina"
Kane Brown	"Bury Me in Georgia"
Carly Pearce; Trisha Yearwood	"Wrong Side of Memphis" "XXX's and OOO's (An American Girl)" "She's in Love with the Boy"
Hardy	"Truck Bed"
Bailey Zimmerman	"Rock and a Hard Place"
Cody Johnson	Celebration of Willie Nelson's 90th birthday "Mammas Don't Let Your Babies Grow Up to Be Cowboys"
Miranda Lambert	"Carousel"
Hailey Whitters	"Everything She Ain't"
Luke Combs	"Love You Anyway"
Ed Sheeran; Luke Combs	"Life Goes On"
The War and Treaty	"Blank Page"
Jason Aldean	"Tough Crowd"
Ashley McBryde; Brandy Clark; Caylee Hammack; Pillbox Patti; John Osborne	"Bonfire at Tina's"
Jelly Roll; Lainey Wilson	"Save Me"
Lainey Wilson	"Grease"
Jordan Davis	"Next Thing You Know"
Dolly Parton	"World on Fire"

== Presenters ==
Presenter(s)	Notes
Dak Prescott and Emmitt Smith	Presented Song of the Year
Dustin Lynch and MacKenzie Porter	Presented Duo of the Year
Chris Young and Mitchell Tenpenny	Presented Group of the Year
Gabby Barrett and Breland	Introduced Bailey Zimmerman
Tanya Tucker	Presented Single of the Year
Mickey Guyton and Tyler Hubbard	Presented Music Event of the Year
Carly Pearce and TJ Osborne	Introduced The War and Treaty
Dolly Parton	Presented Female Artist of the Year
Garth Brooks	Presented Male Artist of the Year
Brandy Clark and Jon Pardi	Introduced Jelly Roll
Keith Urban	Presented Album of the Year
Trisha Yearwood	Presented Entertainer of the Year

== Milestones ==
- Chris Stapleton won "Entertainer of the Year" for the first time. Thus, Stapleton achieved the Triple Crown Award presented at the ACM Honors.
- Kane Brown and Jordan Davis received their first nominations in the "Male Artist of the Year" category.
- Lainey Wilson received her first nomination and win in the "Female Artist of the Year" category.
- Jo Dee Messina received her first nomination since 2001.
