= Am I Okay? =

Studio album by Megan Moroney
- Released: July 12, 2024
- Genre: Country
- Length: 45:44
- Labels: Sony; Columbia
- Producer: Kristian Bush

Megan Moroney chronology
Lucky (2023)	Am I Okay? (2024)	Blue Christmas...Duh (2024)

Singles from Am I Okay?
- 1. "Am I Okay?" Released: August 26, 2024

Am I Okay? is the second studio album by American country music singer-songwriter Megan Moroney, and was released on July 12, 2024, via Sony and Columbia Records. The album is produced by Kristian Bush, who also produced Moroney's debut album, Lucky. Moroney wrote or co-wrote all fourteen songs on the album, which was preceded by the release of the lead promotional single "No Caller ID" on January 19, 2024. Additional promotional singles followed, including "28th of June", and "Indifferent". In the week leading up to the album's release, Moroney put out two more singles: "Man on the Moon" and "Hell of a Show". The album's title track was released as its lead single to country radio on August 26, 2024.

A deluxe edition of the album was released on October 4, 2024.

== Background ==
Am I Okay? follows Moroney's debut album, Lucky, released the year prior. Moroney announced the album on May 3, 2024, along with the promotional single "Indifferent". The album has been described by a press release as showcasing "endless ways that heartbreak upends our lives". Moroney has established an "emo cowgirl" style since the release of her first single due to the emotions displayed in her songs, and this album has fully committed to that style.

In an interview with Billboard, Moroney discussed re-teaming with Kristian Bush for a second time, stating "he's a huge part of the sound we've created. I love that everything sounds very live. You can tell it's real people playing the instruments. We go into the studio and we're like, 'I'm a songwriter first, so what sounds best to amplify the story I'm telling?' He's brilliant, and I don't see us not working together", and expressed that she felt more pressure making Lucky than Am I Okay? because she was so busy recording this album that she "didn't have time to overthink it". Describing how the songs were written organically, Moroney explained "There would be things going on in my personal life and I wanted to write about it. I wrote it to be therapeutic, and then I look down and I'm like, 'Oh, I have a whole album, and all these songs go together', and added that she assigns a color to each of her projects because she "associates color with emotion". She stated that "when I wrote 'Miss Universe,' the oldest song on the album, I was like, 'That's my royal blue color,' and I hoped the rest of the songs I wrote for the album would fit into that blue. I think, 'Indifferent,' 'Am I Okay?' 'Man on the Moon,' all of those feel like that. Royal blue is this powerful color—it can be strong and it can be sad. So, everything in my world is blue right now."

Moroney stated she had been developing the album "living in the studio" since the release of Lucky, alongside her touring. The track listing was revealed on June 28, 2024.

== Critical reception ==
Professional ratings
Review scores
Source	Rating
And It Don't Stop	A−
Rolling Stone	3.5/5 stars

Am I Okay? received favorable feedback from critics upon release. Rolling Stone described Am I Okay? as displaying Megan Moroney "deep in her feels" with references to therapy ("No Caller ID"), fears of dying alone ("Third Time's the Charm"), blasé resignation ("Indifferent"), and a "mournful goodbye ballad" inspired by the loss of her uncle in the September 11 attacks ("Heaven by Noon"). Despite the heaviness of topics at hand, the outlet said the album avoids being a "dour" project, citing Moroney's "deft way around a lyric" coupled with producer Kristian Bush's "radio-ready" touch combining to make it "one of the most enjoyable listening experiences of the year". Chris Willman of Variety declared that the album "proves that she's a country keeper" with a songwriting effort focused on real-life experiences that "feels closer to the bone than it does in most Music City fare". He highlighted the lyricism and variety in material from the sadness of tracks like "No Caller ID" and "Heaven by Noon" to the humor of "Miss Universe" to the upbeat nature of "Man on the Moon" and "Indifferent", and also spoke favorably about the album's heavy reliance on steel guitar and Moroney's vocals that range between an everyday drawl and a raspy edge. Holler writer Jof Owen rated the album a 9/10, favorably describing it as "something that's been created by a woman, for women and about women". AP writer Maria Sherman referred to Am I Okay? as more "expansive" than her debut album, saying that "while most of the songs on this 14-track collection veer into less optimistic territory, Moroney's increased confidence is heard where it matters most: in the strength of her songwriting". Several publications drew comparisons to Taylor Swift on the track "Noah".

== Commercial performance ==
Am I Okay? debuted at number 9 on the Billboard 200 and number 3 on the Billboard Top Country Albums chart dated July 27, 2024, with 43,000 first-week units.

== Track listing ==
All tracks are written by Megan Moroney, with additional co-writers as noted.

Am I Okay? – standard edition
No.	Title	Writer(s)	Length
1.	"Am I Okay?"	Megan Moroney; Jessie Jo Dillon; Luke Laird	3:55
2.	"Third Time's the Charm"		3:51
3.	"No Caller ID"	Moroney; Jessi Alexander; Dillon; Connie Harrington	3:28
4.	"Man on the Moon"	Ashley Gorley; Casey Smith; David Mescon	3:07
5.	"28th of June"	Mackenzie Carpenter; Micah Carpenter; Mescon; Ben Williams	3:45
6.	"Indifferent"	Mackenzie Carpenter; Micah Carpenter; Williams	2:56
7.	"Noah"	Alexander; Dillon; Harrington	3:31
8.	"Miss Universe"	AJ Pruis; Liz Rose	3:01
9.	"Mama I Lied"	Rob Hatch; Mescon; Williams	3:27
10.	"I Know You"	Jacob Kasher Hindlin; Mescon; Williams	2:40
11.	"The Girls"	Mackenzie Carpenter; Micah Carpenter; Williams	3:06
12.	"Heaven by Noon"	Dillon; Matt Jenkins	3:42
13.	"Hope You're Happy"	Laird; Shane McAnally	3:28
14.	"Hell of a Show"		1:47
Total length:			45:44

Am I Okay? (I'll Be Fine) – deluxe edition
No.	Title	Writer(s)	Length
15.	"Break It Right Back"	Hatch; Mescon; Williams	3:34
16.	"Bless Your Heart"	Alexander; Dillon; Harrington	2:43
17.	"I'll Be Fine"	Hatch; Mescon; Williams	3:40
Total length:			55:41

== Personnel ==
Musicians

- Megan Moroney – lead vocals (all tracks), background vocals (1–13), acoustic guitar (14)
- Justin Schipper – steel guitar (tracks 1–13), electric guitar (1, 3, 8, 10, 11, 13), banjo (7), Dobro (9, 10, 12), acoustic guitar (10)
- Travis McNabb – drums (tracks 1–4, 6–9, 11–13), percussion (1, 3, 4, 6–9, 11–13)
- Brandon Bush – synthesizer (tracks 1, 2, 4, 6–8, 10–13), piano (1, 2, 5, 7, 10), programming (1, 4, 6, 10), background vocals (1), organ (2, 4, 7, 8, 11, 12), keyboards (3, 4), percussion (4, 8), vocoder (8), bass (10), Mellotron (12)
- Justin Niebank – programming (tracks 1, 2, 4, 7–13)
- Ted Pecchio – bass (tracks 1, 3–6, 8, 9, 12, 13)
- Kristian Bush – acoustic guitar (tracks 1, 3, 4, 6–10, 13), backing vocals (1), mandolin (3, 7, 11, 13), electric guitar (8)
- Benji Shanks – electric guitar (tracks 1, 3, 4, 6–9, 13), background vocals (1), acoustic guitar (3, 6–9, 13)
- Hayley Corbett – background vocals (tracks 1, 6)
- Juli Griffith – background vocals (tracks 1, 6)
- Celia Dawson – background vocals (track 1)
- Charlie Worsham – acoustic guitar, electric guitar (tracks 2, 11, 12); 12-string guitar, banjo (10)
- Tom Bukovac – electric guitar (tracks 2, 10, 11)
- Carole Rabinowitz – cello (track 9)
- Krista Wilkinson – viola (track 9)
- David Angell – violin (track 9)
- David Davidson – violin (track 9)
- Vince Gill – background vocals (track 13)

Technical

- Kristian Bush – producing
- Nathan Dantzler – mastering
- Drew Bollman – mixing (all tracks), recording (tracks 1, 2, 4–7, 9–14)
- Justin Niebank – mixing
- Luke Campolieta – recording (tracks 1–4, 6–13), vocal engineering (1–13)
- Seth Morton – recording (tracks 1, 6, 13)
- Buckley Miller – recording (tracks 3, 8, 9, 14), vocal engineering (14)
- Matt Rausch – recording (track 13)
- Mike "Frog" Griffin – project coordination
- Harrison Tate – engineering assistance
- Austin Brown – engineering assistance (tracks 1, 4–7, 9, 13)
- Steve Cordray – engineering assistance (tracks 2, 10–12)
- Michael Walter – engineering assistance (tracks 3, 8, 9)

== Charts ==
=== Weekly charts ===
Weekly chart performance for Am I Okay?
Chart (2024)	Peak position
Australian Country Albums (ARIA)	16
Australian Hitseekers Albums (ARIA)	6
Canadian Albums (Billboard)	36
Scottish Albums (Official Charts)	43
UK Album Downloads (Official Charts)	28
UK Country Albums (Official Charts)	4
US Billboard 200	9
US Top Country Albums (Billboard)	3

=== Year-end charts ===
2024 year-end chart performance for Am I Okay?
Chart (2024)	Position
Australian Country Albums (ARIA)	48
US Top Country Albums (Billboard)	43

2025 year-end chart performance for Am I Okay?
Chart (2025)	Position
US Billboard 200	93
US Top Country Albums (Billboard)	16

== Certifications ==
Certifications for Am I Okay?
Region	Certification	Certified units/sales
Canada (Music Canada)	Gold	40,000^{‡}
United States (RIAA)	Platinum	1,000,000^{‡}
^{‡} Sales+streaming figures based on certification alone.

== Accolades ==
Year-end lists
Publication	Rank	List
Holler	2	The 25 Best Country Albums of 2024
Rolling Stone	11	The 30 Best Country Albums of 2024
Taste of Country	3	The 10 Best Country Albums of 2024
