= Lucky (Megan Moroney album) =

Studio album by Megan Moroney
- Released: May 5, 2023
- Genre: Country
- Length: 42:07
- Label: Sony
- Producer: Kristian Bush

Megan Moroney chronology
Pistol Made of Roses (2022)	Lucky (2023)	Am I Okay? (2024)

Singles from Lucky
- 1. "Tennessee Orange" Released: December 5, 2022; 2. "I'm Not Pretty" Released: August 7, 2023

Lucky is the debut studio album by American country music singer Megan Moroney, released through Sony Music on May 5, 2023. It was preceded by the single "Tennessee Orange", as well as the songs "I'm Not Pretty", "Girl in the Mirror" and "Lucky".

The album reached the top 40 of the US Billboard 200 and the top-ten of the Top Country Albums, being certified gold by RIAA. A deluxe edition of the album was released on September 22, 2023.

== Background and composition ==
After being graduated at the University of Georgia, Moroney had interned for Kristian Bush of country music duo Sugarland. Between 2020 and 2021 Moroney move to Nashville, attending songwriting courses and writing sessions. In 2022 Moroney published her first single "Tennessee Orange", which were viral on social media, getting her a contract from Punchbowl Entertainment and a co-label deal with Sony Music Nashville and Columbia Records. After the contract Moroney asked Bush to collaborate on her debut studio album.

Lucky was produced by Kristian Bush while all the thirteen tracks were written by Moroney herself, with contributions by several songwriters, including David Fanning, Rodney Clawson, Luke Laird, Lori McKenna and Jessie Jo Dillon. In an interview with American Songwriter Moroney described the meaning of the album and its composition process:

"I wanted my first record to be basically everything I love about country music. I wanted to make people feel all kinds of things. Lucky is a party song. Girl in the Mirror is obviously really sad. Sleep On My Side is funny. It covers many things."

== Critical reception ==
Professional ratings
Review scores
Source	Rating
AllMusic	4.5/5 stars
And It Don't Stop	A−
Entertainment Focus	4.5/5 stars
Holler	9/10

Stephen Thomas Erlewine wrote that the album's "colorful production makes its debt to traditional country seem vibrant and fresh, but it's the unexpected twists and turns within Moroney's songs that give the album life and heart". Erlewine also felt that Moroney has a "gift for wordplay" with "internal rhymes and sly punch lines" and that by "reviving the sounds of the past, she sounds thoroughly of the moment". James Daykin of Entertainment Focus called Moroney "such a clever writer", writing that her "melodies are strong and the storytelling even stronger as she twists and turns her way through these 13 tracks. There's heartbreak aplenty but there's also empowerment, purpose and love scattered throughout the beguiling tracks". Jof Owen of Holler described Lucky as "fierce, funny and deliciously acerbic" and wrote that it "captures the best and worst bits of being in love, all delivered with a hairdresser's convivial humour and down-to-earth conversational charm". Lesley Janes of The Nash News opined that there are "plenty of anthems for broken hearts to run to on this record". Rolling Stone named it the top country album of 2023.

== Track listing ==
All tracks are written by Megan Moroney, with additional co-writers noted.

Lucky – standard edition
No.	Title	Writer(s)	Length
1.	"I'm Not Pretty"	Mackenzie Carpenter; Micah Carpenter; Ben Williams	3:01
2.	"Lucky"	David Mescon; Casey Smith; Williams	2:41
3.	"Tennessee Orange"	David Fanning; Paul Jenkins; Williams	3:43
4.	"Kansas Anymore"	Rodney Clawson; Luke Laird; Lori McKenna	3:34
5.	"Girl in the Mirror"	Jessie Jo Dillon; Matt Jenkins	2:45
6.	"Another on the Way"	Mescon; Smith; Williams	2:34
7.	"Traitor Joe"	Casey Brown; Parker Welling; Williams	2:33
8.	"Why Johnny"	Conor Matthews	4:01
9.	"God Plays a Gibson"	Mackenzie Carpenter; Colin Healy	3:31
10.	"Georgia Girl"	Peter Daniel Newman; Adam Wheeler	3:37
11.	"Sleep on My Side"	Steve McMorran; Williams	3:08
12.	"Mustang or Me"	Mackenzie Carpenter; Micah Carpenter; Williams	3:23
13.	"Sad Songs for Sad People"	Ian Christian; Jordan Fletcher	3:36
Total length:			42:07

Lucky – deluxe edition
No.	Title	Writer(s)	Length
14.	"Fix You Too" (with Kameron Marlowe)	Wheeler; Becca Rae Greene	3:19
15.	"Nothin' Crazy" (with Mackenzie Carpenter)	Mackenzie Carpenter; Micah Carpenter; Williams	3:11
16.	"Reasons to Stay"	Alexandra Kolea; Caroline Watkins; Rachel Wiggins	4:11
Total length:			52:48

== Charts ==
=== Weekly charts ===
Weekly chart performance for Lucky
Chart (2023)	Peak position
Australian Country Albums (ARIA)	22
UK Album Downloads (Official Charts)	73
US Billboard 200	38
US Top Country Albums (Billboard)	10

=== Year-end charts ===
Year-end chart performance for Lucky
Chart (2023)	Position
US Top Country Albums (Billboard)	45
Chart (2024)	Position
Australian Country Albums (ARIA)	72
US Top Country Albums (Billboard)	33
Chart (2025)	Position
US Top Country Albums (Billboard)	41

== Certifications ==
Certifications for Lucky
Region	Certification	Certified units/sales
Canada (Music Canada)	Gold	40,000^{‡}
United States (RIAA)	Platinum	1,000,000^{‡}
^{‡} Sales+streaming figures based on certification alone.
