= Woman (Kane Brown song) =

2026 single by Kane Brown

Single by Kane Brown
- Released: March 13, 2026
- Genre: Country
- Length: 2:46
- Label: RCA Nashville
- Songwriters: Kane Brown; John Byron; Ashley Gorley; Ben Johnson; Taylor Phillips
- Producer: Dann Huff

Kane Brown singles chronology
"Unspoken" (2025)	"Woman" (2026)	"Boots" (2026)

Music video
- "Woman" on YouTube

"Woman" is a song by American country music singer Kane Brown It released on March 13, 2026 as the lead single from his upcoming fifth studio album. It was written by Brown himself, John Byron, Ashley Gorley, Ben Johnson and Taylor Phillips and produced by Dann Huff. The song is about a man rejecting his friends' pleas to chase after girls at a bar because he has a woman back home.

== Background ==
During a writing camp, Kane Brown conceived the line "they're talking about girls, but I got a woman" as he was warming up food in the kitchen after writing seven songs that day. He told his co-writers about his idea and they immediately loved it.

== Composition ==
The song has an upbeat groove and is described as blending "modern and pop country". The lyrics center on a man who is not interested in chasing other women at the bar with his friends, despite them begging him to, because he already has a woman at home to take care of. He describes his partner as a perfect match for him.

== Music video ==
The music video was released alongside the single. Filmed at Universal Studios Florida, it shows Kane Brown dancing. His wife Katelyn and their eldest daughter Kingsley appear alongside him.

== Live performance ==
On May 17, 2026, Brown performed "Woman" at the 61st Academy of Country Music Awards, being accompanied by backup dancers as he walks through the crowd.

== Charts ==
Chart performance for "Woman"
Chart (2026)	Peak position
Canada Hot 100 (Billboard)	55
Canada Country (Billboard)	2
US Billboard Hot 100	46
US Country Airplay (Billboard)	2
US Hot Country Songs (Billboard)	14
