= What Are You Listening To? =

Single by Chris Stapleton
- Released: June 17, 2013
- Genre: Country
- Length: 4:05
- Label: Mercury Nashville
- Songwriters: Chris Stapleton; Lee Thomas Miller
- Producer: Tony Brown

Chris Stapleton singles chronology
"What Are You Listening To?" (2013)	"Traveller" (2015)

"What Are You Listening To?" is a single by American country music singer Chris Stapleton. It was his first single release, being sent to radio in 2013.

== Content ==
"What Are You Listening To?" is a country music song with R&B and soul music influences. Lyrically, the song is about a man who has broken up with his partner, and is inquiring about the kind of music she is listening to at the moment.

== Critical reception ==
Tara Seetharam of Country Universe rated the song "A–", praising Stapleton's vocals and the "catharsis" of the lyrics.

== Chart performance ==
Chart (2013)	Peak position
US Country Airplay (Billboard)	46

== Certifications ==
Region	Certification	Certified units/sales
United States (RIAA)	Platinum	1,000,000^{‡}
^{‡} Sales+streaming figures based on certification alone.

== Covers ==
When Ruthie Foster released her album Joy Comes Back (2017): Blue Corn Music, this was the first album track.

In December 2023, Megan Moroney released a cover of the song exclusively through Amazon Music.
