= You Had to Be There (song) =

Single by Megan Moroney and Kenny Chesney
- Released: May 9, 2025
- Genre: Country
- Length: 3:40
- Label: Sony; Columbia
- Songwriters: Megan Moroney; MacKenzie Carpenter; Micah Carpenter; Ben Williams
- Producer: Kristian Bush

Megan Moroney singles chronology
"Am I Okay?" (2024)	"You Had to Be There" (2025)	"6 Months Later" (2025)

Kenny Chesney singles chronology
"Just to Say We Did" (2024)	"You Had to Be There" (2025)	"Carry On" (2026)

Music video
- "You Had to Be There" on YouTube

"You Had to Be There" is a song by American country music singers Megan Moroney and Kenny Chesney. It was released on May 9, 2025. Moroney co-wrote the song with MacKenzie Carpenter, Micah Carpenter, and Ben Williams, and it was produced by Kristian Bush.

== Background ==
"You Had to Be There" was written on December 19, 2024, during a writer's retreat in Panama City, Florida, following Moroney's run as an opening act on Chesney's Sun Goes Down Tour in the summer of 2024. It served as a full circle moment for the singer as she wrote the first verse as a reflection on seeing Chesney live in concert from the perspective of a fan from "nosebleed seats" in Atlanta, Georgia in 2018, and then the second verse sets up that seven years later she's now on stage performing with him. Moroney personally gifted the song to Chesney, who ended up loving it, and collaborated on the track with Moroney for its release.

Moroney announced the release of the song on April 30, 2025, via her social media accounts, followed by posting a scrapbook of the song's original handwritten lyrics, including a response from Chesney stating: "What an amazing way to start 2025. Megan gave me the gift of music with a song she wrote about our tour together!! Nobody has ever written a song for me before. What a gift ... Love you Megan!"

== Chart performance ==
"You Had to Be There" went for immediate airplay at country radio and pulled in 117 station adds at the format upon impact, and debuted at number 23 on the Billboard Country Airplay chart.

== Charts ==
Chart performance for "You Had to Be There"
Chart (2025)	Peak position
Canada Country (Billboard)	27
New Zealand Hot Singles (RMNZ)	38
US Billboard Hot 100	86
US Country Airplay (Billboard)	23
US Hot Country Songs (Billboard)	25

== Certifications ==
Certifications for "You Had to Be There"
Region	Certification	Certified units/sales
United States (RIAA)	Gold	500,000^{‡}
^{‡} Sales+streaming figures based on certification alone.
