= Megan Moroney =

American country singer (born 1997)

- Born: Megan Ann Moroney; October 9, 1997 (age 29); Savannah, Georgia, U.S.
- Genre: Country
- Occupations: Singer; songwriter
- Instruments: Vocals; guitar
- Years active: 2018–present
- Label: Columbia Nashville
- Website: meganmoroney.com

Megan Ann Moroney (born October 9, 1997) is an American country music singer and songwriter from Douglasville, Georgia, west of Atlanta. Moroney first gained attention from her single "Hair Salon", which was included on her debut EP Pistol Made of Roses. "Tennessee Orange", the first single from her debut album, peaked at number 10 on the US Hot Country Songs chart and helped boost Moroney's career. Her first full-length album Lucky was released in May 2023, reaching the top 40 of the Billboard 200. She released her second album, Am I Okay?, in July 2024. The singles "Am I Okay?" and "No Caller ID" peaked at number 34 and number 58 on the Billboard Hot 100. The album itself debuted at number nine on the Billboard 200. In February 2026, her album Cloud 9 entered the Billboard 200 at number one.

== Early life ==
Moroney was born on October 9, 1997, in Savannah, Georgia. She has two brothers, Connor and Brian. Moroney was raised in a musical household in Douglasville, Georgia, in metropolitan Atlanta. She began listening to country music in her childhood and learned to play piano. Moroney went to Robert S. Alexander High School and participated in cheerleading and musical theater. She attended the University of Georgia in Athens and was in the Kappa Delta sorority. At UGA, she studied accounting before changing her major to marketing and graduated in 2020 with a bachelor's degree and a certificate in music business.

== Career ==
=== Early career (2020–2021) ===
While in college, Moroney opened a concert for Jon Langston singing and interned for Kristian Bush of Sugarland. After graduating, she moved to Nashville, to begin a music career. She kept in contact with Bush, which led to him introducing her to other songwriters. She released her first single "Wonder" in 2021 leading to her release of an extended play titled Pistol Made of Roses. Moroney writes and co-writes all of her own music.

=== Breakthrough and Lucky (2022–2023) ===
Her next single release was "Tennessee Orange" in 2022, a track on which Bush served as producer. After the song became popular through online streaming, Moroney signed with Sony Music, originally on the Arista Nashville label. In late 2022, "Tennessee Orange" debuted at number 94 on the Billboard Hot 100, giving Moroney her first chart entry. At the time, the song also charted on Billboard Hot Country Songs and Country Airplay.

After a reorganisation of Sony Music while the song was climbing the charts, Sony transferred Moroney to Columbia Records Nashville. On May 5, 2023, Moroney released her debut album Lucky. The album featured the singles "Tennessee Orange" and "I'm Not Pretty". The album reached the top 40 of the Billboard 200. The album was named as the Best Country and American album of 2023 by Rolling Stone with writer Jonathan Bernstein saying that Moroney created a "casual, youth-conversant tone [which] makes it shine and comes naturally". A deluxe version of the album was released on September 22. 2023. She released a cover version of Chris Stapleton's 2013 single "What Are You Listening To?" as an Amazon Music exclusive on October 6, 2023. The song was released on other streaming platforms in January 2024.

=== Am I Okay? (2024–2025) ===
Since then, she has released a song with Old Dominion titled "Can't Break Up Now", a single "No Caller ID", and the deluxe version of her debut album Lucky. On May 2, 2024, Moroney announced her second album Am I Okay?. It was released on July 12, 2024. On November 1, 2024, Moroney released her first Christmas album, an EP entitled Blue Christmas...Duh. In March of 2025, Moroney embarked on her Am I Okay? Tour in Montreal, Quebec ending in October 2025 in Tampa, Florida.

=== Cloud 9 (2025–present) ===
"6 Months Later" was released as the album's first single on June 20, 2025. On October 14, 2025, Moroney announced "Beautiful Things", which was released as the second single on October 27, 2025. On November 9, 2025, she took to social media to post a teaser trailer for the album, opening a window from a blue backdrop of the Am I Okay? album cover fading into a pink color, with the instrumental of the album's title track playing in the background. On November 11, the album's release date and name were officially revealed and slated for a February 20, 2026 date. This would become her first No. 1 on the Billboard 200, debuting with 147,000 equivalent album units in the US for the week ending Feb. 26.

== Personal life ==
After the release of "Tennessee Orange", Moroney received attention on social media for wearing a Tennessee Volunteers shirt belonging to American country singer Morgan Wallen; it led to rumors that she was dating him. Though Moroney was initially neutral when asked if the two were in a relationship, in 2024, she said that they had been romantically involved though "It was never a relationship." They remained friends. In early 2024, she was in a relationship with an undisclosed man who she says is not a celebrity, She has lived in Nashville since 2020. Moroney is a longtime supporter of St. Jude Children's Research Hospital, including creating an Erewhon smoothie supporting St. Jude.

Moroney is a Georgia Bulldogs football fan, her alma mater.

== Discography ==
=== Studio albums ===
List of albums, with selected details and chart positions
Title	Details	Peak chart positions							Certifications
Title	Details	US	US Country	AUS	CAN	IRE	NZ	UK	Certifications
Lucky	Released: May 5, 2023; Label: Columbia Nashville; Formats: CD, download, streaming, vinyl	38	10	—	—	—	—	—	RIAA: Platinum; MC: Gold
Am I Okay?	Released: July 12, 2024; Label: Columbia Nashville; Formats: CD, download, streaming, vinyl	9	3	— (Note: Am I Okay? did not enter the ARIA Albums Chart, but peaked at number 6 on the ARIA Hitseekers Albums Chart.)	36	—	—	—	RIAA: Platinum; MC: Gold
Cloud 9	Released: February 20, 2026; Label: Columbia Nashville; Formats: CD, download, streaming, vinyl	1	1	20	4	100	24	67	RIAA: Gold
"—" denotes a recording that did not chart.

=== Live albums ===
List of live albums
Title	Album details
Am I Okay? Tour (Live)	Released: October 9, 2025; Label: Columbia Nashville; Formats: Download, streaming

=== Extended plays ===
List of EPs, with selected details
Title	Details
Pistol Made of Roses	Released: July 15, 2022; Label: Self-released; Formats: Download, streaming, vinyl
Blue Christmas...Duh	Released: November 1, 2024; Label: Columbia Nashville; Formats: Download, streaming, vinyl

=== Singles ===
List of singles, with selected chart positions
Title	Year	Peak positions							Certifications	Album
Title	Year	US	US Country	US Country Airplay	CAN	CAN Country	NZ Hot	WW	Certifications	Album
"Tennessee Orange"	2022	30	10	4	57	3	—	—	RIAA: 5× Platinum; BPI: Silver; MC: 3× Platinum; RMNZ: Platinum	Lucky
"I'm Not Pretty"	2023	— (Note: "I'm Not Pretty" did not enter the US Billboard Hot 100, but peaked at number 14 on the Bubbling Under Hot 100 chart.)	32	14	—	35	—	—	RIAA: 2× Platinum; MC: Platinum	Lucky
"Can't Break Up Now" (with Old Dominion)	2023	—	42	19	—	44	—	—		Memory Lane
"Am I Okay?"	2024	34	12	2	56	34	—	—	RIAA: 2× Platinum; MC: Gold	Am I Okay?
"You Had to Be There" (with Kenny Chesney)	2025	86	25	23	—	27	—	—	RIAA: Gold	Non-album single
"6 Months Later"	2025	29	8	2	34	1	28	106	RIAA: Platinum	Cloud 9
"Beautiful Things"	2025	32	8	4	65	3	23	—	RIAA: Gold	Cloud 9
"Medicine"	2026	39	11	14	51	21	24	—		Cloud 9
"—" denotes a recording that did not chart.

=== Promotional singles ===
List of promotional singles, with selected chart positions, certifications and album names
Title	Year	Peak chart positions				Certifications	Album
Title	Year	US	US Country	CAN	NZ Hot	Certifications	Album
"Wonder"	2021	—	—	—	—		Non-album single
"Hair Salon"	2022	—	—	—	—	RIAA: Gold	Pistol Made of Roses
"Fix You Too"	2022	—	—	—	—		Pistol Made of Roses
"I Love Me"	2022	—	—	—	—		Pistol Made of Roses
"Lucky"	2023	—	—	—	—		Lucky
"What Are You Listening To?"	2023	—	—	—	—		Non-album single
"No Caller ID"	2024	58	13	99	27	RIAA: Platinum; MC: Gold	Am I Okay?
"28th of June"	2024	—	50	—	—		Am I Okay?
"Indifferent"	2024	91	21	—	—	RIAA: Platinum; MC: Gold	Am I Okay?
"Never Left Me"	2024	—	—	—	—		Twisters: The Album
"Man on the Moon"	2024	—	—	—	—		Am I Okay?
"Wish I Didn't"	2026	41	12	63	20		Cloud 9
"Cloud 9"	2026	63	21	77	18		Cloud 9
"—" denotes a recording that did not chart.

=== Other charted and certified songs ===
List of other charted songs, with selected chart positions, certifications and album names
Title	Year	Peak chart positions					Certifications	Album
Title	Year	US	US Country	US Country Airplay	CAN	NZ Hot	Certifications	Album
"Girl in the Mirror"	2023	—	—	—	—	—	RIAA: Gold	Lucky
"Sleep on My Side"	2023	—	—	—	—	—	RIAA: Gold	Lucky
"Mama I Lied"	2024	—	48	—	—	—	RIAA: Gold	Am I Okay?
"Break It Right Back"	2024	— (Note: "Break It Right Back" did not enter the US Billboard Hot 100, but peaked at number 10 on the Bubbling Under Hot 100 chart.)	33	—	—	—	RIAA: Gold	Am I Okay?
"All I Want for Christmas Is a Cowboy"	2024	—	—	46	—	—		Blue Christmas...Duh
"Stupid"	2026	83	26	—	—	—		Cloud 9
"Convincing"	2026	97	30	—	—	—		Cloud 9
"Liars & Tigers & Bears"	2026	— (Note: "Liars & Tigers & Bears" did not enter the US Billboard Hot 100, but peaked at number 5 on the Bubbling Under Hot 100 chart.)	36	—	—	—		Cloud 9
"I Only Miss You" (featuring Ed Sheeran)	2026	67	22	—	79	25		Cloud 9
"Wedding Dress"	2026	58	17	—	85	—		Cloud 9
"Change of Heart"	2026	— (Note: "Change of Heart" did not enter the US Billboard Hot 100, but peaked at number 1 on the Bubbling Under Hot 100 chart.)	32	—	—	—		Cloud 9
"Bells & Whistles" (featuring Kacey Musgraves)	2026	— (Note: "Bells & Whistles" did not enter the US Billboard Hot 100, but peaked at number 4 on the Bubbling Under Hot 100 chart.)	35	—	—	—		Cloud 9
"Table for Two"	2026	— (Note: "Table for Two" did not enter the US Billboard Hot 100, but peaked at number 11 on the Bubbling Under Hot 100 chart.)	38	—	—	—		Cloud 9
"Who Hurt You?"	2026	68	23	—	92	—		Cloud 9
"Waiting on the Rain"	2026	— (Note: "Waiting on the Rain" did not enter the US Billboard Hot 100, but peaked at number 15 on the Bubbling Under Hot 100 chart.)	39	—	—	—		Cloud 9
"Traitor (Roles Reversed)"	2026	— (Note: "Traitor (Roles Reversed)" did not enter the US Billboard Hot 100, but peaked at number 4 on the Bubbling Under Hot 100 chart.)	30	—	—	—		Cloud 9
"You for Me" (Smokey Mountain Demo)	2026	—	43	—	—	—		Non-album song
"—" denotes a recording that did not chart.

== Concert tours ==
- Pistol Made of Roses Tour (2023)
- The Lucky Tour (2023)
- The Lucky Tour 2.0 (2024)
- Am I Okay? Tour (2025)
- The Cloud 9 Tour (2026)

== Awards and nominations ==
Award	Year	Nominated work	Category	Result
Academy of Country Music Awards	2023	Herself	New Female Artist of the Year	Nominated
Academy of Country Music Awards	2024	Herself	New Female Artist of the Year	Won
Academy of Country Music Awards	2024	Herself	Female Artist of the Year	Nominated
Academy of Country Music Awards	2024	"Can't Break Up Now"	Music Event of the Year	Nominated
Academy of Country Music Awards	2024	"Tennessee Orange"	Song of the Year	Nominated
Academy of Country Music Awards	2024	"Tennessee Orange"	Visual Media of the Year	Nominated
Academy of Country Music Awards	2025	Am I Okay?	Album of the Year	Nominated
Academy of Country Music Awards	2025	Herself	Female Artist of the Year	Nominated
Academy of Country Music Awards	2026	Herself	Entertainer of the Year	Nominated
Academy of Country Music Awards	2026	Herself	Female Artist of the Year	Nominated
Academy of Country Music Awards	2026	"6 Months Later"	Single of the Year	Nominated
Academy of Country Music Awards	2026	"Am I Okay?"	Song of the Year	Nominated
Academy of Country Music Awards	2026	Herself	Artist-Songwriter of the Year	Nominated
Academy of Country Music Awards	2026	"6 Months Later"	Visual Media of the Year	Nominated
Academy of Country Music Awards	2026	"You Had to Be There"	Music Event of the Year	Nominated
American Music Awards	2025	Herself	Favorite Female Country Artist	Nominated
American Music Awards	2025	Am I Okay?	Favorite Country Album	Nominated
American Music Awards	2026	Am I Okay? Tour	Breakthrough Touring Artist	Nominated
American Music Awards	2026	Herself	Best Female Country Artist	Nominated
American Music Awards	2026	Cloud 9	Best Country Album	Won
Billboard Women in Music Awards	2025	Herself	Rulebreaker Award	Won
Country Music Association Awards	2023	Herself	New Artist of the Year	Nominated
Country Music Association Awards	2023	"Tennessee Orange"	Song of the Year	Nominated
Country Music Association Awards	2024	Herself	New Artist of the Year	Won
Country Music Association Awards	2024	Herself	Female Vocalist of the Year	Nominated
Country Music Association Awards	2024	"I'm Not Pretty"	Music Video of the Year	Nominated
Country Music Association Awards	2025	Am I Okay?	Album of the Year	Nominated
Country Music Association Awards	2025	Herself	Female Vocalist of the Year	Nominated
Country Music Association Awards	2025	"Am I Okay?"	Single of the Year	Nominated
Country Music Association Awards	2025	"Am I Okay?"	Song of the Year	Nominated
Country Music Association Awards	2025	"Am I Okay?"	Music Video of the Year	Nominated
Country Music Association Awards	2025	"You Had to Be There"	Musical Event of the Year	Nominated
Country Music Association Awards	2026	"Beautiful Things"	Song of the Year	Nominated
Country Music Association Awards	2026	Herself	Female Vocalist of the Year	Nominated
CMT Music Awards	2023	"Tennessee Orange"	Female Breakthrough Video of the Year	Won
CMT Music Awards	2023	"Tennessee Orange"	CMT Digital–First Performance of the Year	Nominated
CMT Music Awards	2024	"I'm Not Pretty"	Female Video of the Year	Nominated
CMT Music Awards	2024	"I'm Not Pretty"	CMT Digital–First Performance of the Year	Nominated
CMT Music Awards	2024	"Can't Break Up Now"	Collaborative Video of the Year	Nominated
Grammy Awards	2027	Cloud 9	Best Contemporary Country Album	Pending
Grammy Awards	2027	"Beautiful Things"	Best Country Song	Pending
IHeartRadio Music Awards	2024	Herself	Best New Country Artist	Nominated
IHeartRadio Music Awards	2024	Herself	Social Star Award	Nominated
IHeartRadio Music Awards	2024	Lucky	Favorite Debut Album	Nominated
MTV Video Music Awards	2025	"Am I Okay?"	Best Country	Won
People's Choice Country Awards	2024	Herself	The Female Artist of 2024	Nominated
People's Choice Country Awards	2024	"No Caller ID"	The Female Song of 2024	Nominated
People's Choice Country Awards	2024	"Can't Break Up Now"	The Collaboration Song of 2024	Nominated

== Music videos ==
Year	Video	Director
2022	"Tennessee Orange"	Jason Lester
2023	"Girl in the Mirror"	Acacia Evans
2023	"I'm Not Pretty"	Jeff Johnson and Megan Moroney
2024	"Am I Okay?"	Alexandra Gavillet and Megan Moroney
2025	"6 Months Later"	Alexandra Gavillet and Megan Moroney
2026	"Wish I Didn't"	Lauren Dunn
