= Hannah Ellis =

American singer-songwriter

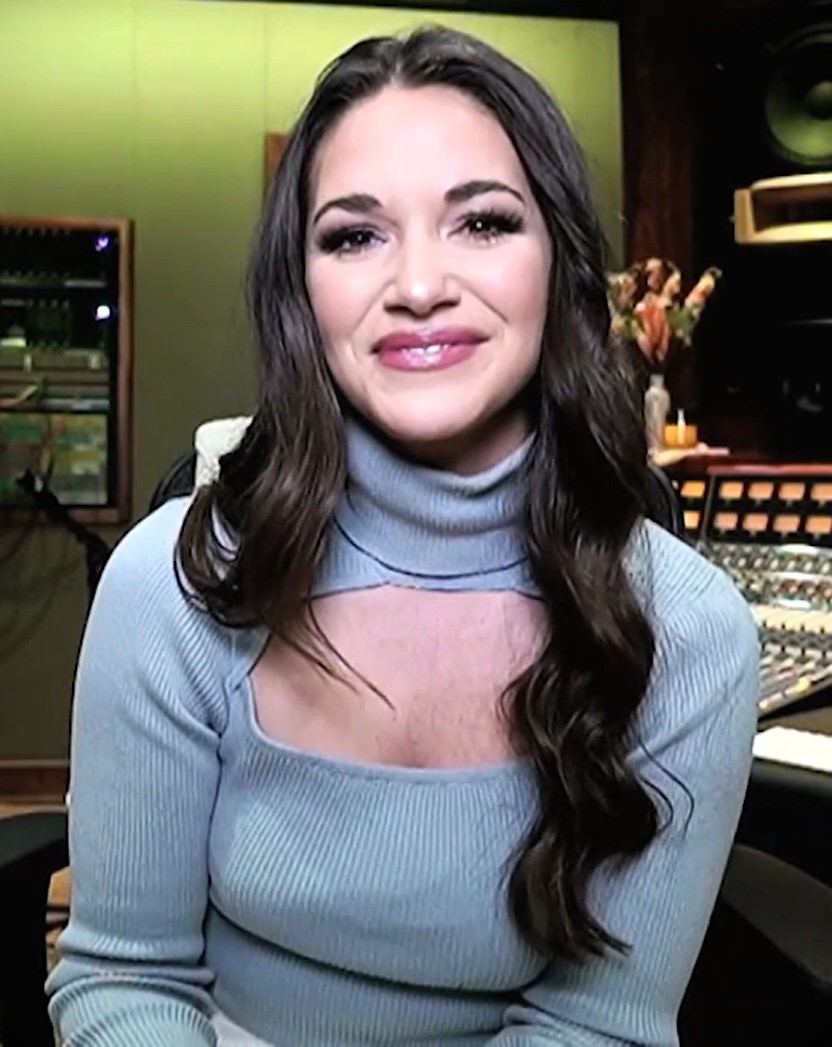
- Ellis in 2023

Background information
- Born: Campbellsville, Kentucky, United States
- Genre: Country
- Occupation: Singer-songwriter
- Instruments: Vocals, guitar
- Years active: 2015–present
- Label: Curb Records
- Website: www.hannahellismusic.com

Hannah Ellis is an American country music singer-songwriter from Campbellsville, Kentucky signed to Curb Records.

== Background ==
Hannah Ellis competed on The Voice in 2015, and was approached with a publishing deal that led to her writing songs for other artists. Ellis later signed to Curb Records and released her first project on the label, a self-titled EP, on October 27, 2017. On October 1, 2021, "Us" was released as Ellis' debut radio single to country radio. It was followed by "Country Can" and "Wine Country", which peaked at number 55 and number 52 on the Billboard Country Airplay chart, respectively. That Girl, Ellis' debut studio album, was released via Curb on January 12, 2024.

== Discography ==
=== Studio albums ===
List of studio albums, with selected details, chart positions and sales
Title	Album details
That Girl	Release date: January 12, 2024; Label: Curb; Format: CD, digital download, LP

=== Extended plays ===
List of EPs, with selected details, chart positions and sales
Title	Album details
Hannah Ellis	Release date: October 27, 2017; Label: Curb; Format: Digital download

=== Singles ===
List of singles, with selected chart positions
Title	Year	Peak chart positions	Album
Title	Year	US Country Airplay	Album
"Us"	2021	—	That Girl
"Country Can"	2022	55	That Girl
"Wine Country"	2023	52	That Girl
