= Cathie Taylor =

American singer (born 1944)

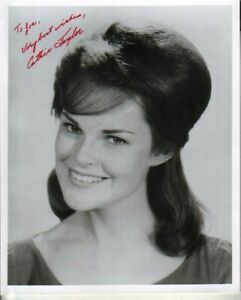
- Born: July 26, 1944 (age 81); Winnipeg, Manitoba, Canada
- Occupations: Singer-songwriter, musician, actress

Cathie Taylor (born July 26, 1944) is a Canadian-born singer of country music and later Gospel music who won two Academy of Country Music Awards and was a regular vocalist on several television series.

== Early life and juvenile singing career ==
Cathie Taylor, the daughter of Anne and Cecil Taylor, was born in Winnipeg, Manitoba on July 26, 1944. She has a sister and a brother. Taylor's father died when she was three years old, and her family moved to Vancouver, to live near a maternal aunt. When her sister received a scholarship to a teacher's training college in California her family moved to the United States.

Taylor's first television performance was when she was 11-years-old, as a Mouseketeer on The Mickey Mouse Club. At the age of 13 she had her own radio show, The Cathie Taylor Show, on KPER in Gilroy, California.

In 1959, when Taylor was fifteen years old, she signed a five year recording contract with Capitol Records.

== Adult singing career ==
Taylor was a guest performer on the June 30, 1961 episode of Five Star Jubilee. In 1962 Taylor was a cast member on The Roy Rogers and Dale Evans Show, and in 1963 she was a regular on The Tennessee Ernie Ford Show, and had a small music role in the 1963 film Hootenanny Hoot.

Taylor became a regular vocalist on the 1966 syndicated television series Gene Autry's Melody Ranch. During the same year she had a guest spot at Kraft Music Hall.

In 1968 she was a regular singer during the final year of the daily Don McNeill Show (previously Don McNeill's Breakfast Club), broadcast from Chicago, Illinois. She appeared on the long-running radio show's final episode, on December 27 of that year.

== Music awards ==
The Country Music Association Awards (CMA Awards) honored her as Most Promising Female Vocalist in 1966, and Top Female Vocalist in 1968.

== Gospel music ==
During the 1970s Taylor was a regular vocalist on the CBN's The 700 Club and gave church concerts.

== Selected filmography ==
- The Alfred Hitchcock Hour (1963) (Season 1 Episode 31: "Run for Doom") as Singer
