= Jessie Jo Dillon =

American songwriter (born 1987)

Jessie Jo Dillon (born February 11, 1989) is an American songwriter with Big Machine Music. She is the daughter of country musician and songwriter Dean Dillon and his ex-wife Keni Wehrman, a Warner Bros. Records executive. She has received seven Grammy Award nominations and three consecutive Academy of Country Music Awards "Songwriter of the Year awards.

== Career ==
Dillon received three nominations for the Grammy Award for Songwriter of the Year, Non-Classical at the 66th Annual Grammy Awards for her work on songs by Brandy Clark, Megan Moroney, Jelly Roll, Catie Offerman, Dan + Shay, Old Dominion, Hardy, and Lori McKenna. She received a second at the following ceremony for her work on song by Moroney, Post Malone, Morgan Wallen, Keith Urban, and Kelsea Ballerini.

== Discography ==
As of October 2020, Dillon had written over 900 songs in the Broadcast Music, Inc. database. Most are collaborations, Her biggest hit is "10,000 Hours" (2019), which she cowrote for Dan + Shay unaware that Justin Bieber would guest on it. The song reached number 1 on the Billboard Country Airplay and Hot Country Songs charts, and the Canada Country chart.

=== Notable songs ===
- "Crazy Women" (2010)
  - performed by LeAnn Rimes
  - co-written with Brandy Clark and Shane McAnally
- "The Breath You Take" (2010)
  - performed by George Strait
  - co-written with Casey Beathard and Dean Dillon
- "Break Up in the End" (2018)
  - performed by Cole Swindell
  - co-written with Chase McGill and Jon Nite
- "Rich" (2018)
  - performed by Maren Morris
  - co-written with Maren Morris and Laura Veltz
- "10,000 Hours" (2019)
  - performed by Dan + Shay featuring Justin Bieber
  - co-written with Justin Bieber, Jason Boyd, Shay Mooney, Jordan Reynolds, and Dan Smyers
- "To Hell & Back" (2020)
  - performed by Maren Morris
  - co-written with Maren Morris and Laura Veltz
- "Memory Lane" (2023)
  - performed by Old Dominion
  - co-written with Matthew Ramsey, Trevor Rosen, and Brad Tursi
- "Messed Up as Me" (2024)
  - performed by Keith Urban
  - co-written with Shane McAnally, Michael Lotten, and Rodney Clawson
- "Happen to Me" (2025)
  - performed by Russell Dickerson
  - co-written with Dickerson, Chris LaCorte, and Chase McGill, with an additional writing credit given to Robert Hazard
- "Lighter (The Official FIFA World Cup 2026 Song)" (2026)
  - performed by Jelly Roll and Carín León
  - co-written with Jason DeFord, Jon Randall and Jessi Alexander

== Awards and nominations ==
=== Academy of Country Music Awards ===
Year	Category	Nominated work / nominee(s)	Result	Ref.
2019	Song of the Year	"Break Up in the End"	Nominated	
2020	Song of the Year	"10,000 Hours"	Nominated	
2024	Songwriter of the Year	Herself	Won	
2026	Songwriter of the Year	Herself	Won	

=== Grammy Awards ===
Year	Category	Nominated work	Result	Ref.
2011	Best Country Song	"The Breath You Take"	Nominated	
2019	Best Country Song	"Break Up in the End"	Nominated	
2022	Best Country Song	"Better Than We Found It"	Nominated	
2024	Best Country Song	"Buried	Nominated	
2024	Songwriter of the Year, Non-Classical	"Buried", "Girl in the Mirror", "Halfway to Hell", "I Just Killed A Man", "Memory Lane", "Neon Cowgirl", "Screen", "The Town in Your Heart", "Up Above The Clouds (Cecilia's Song)"	Nominated	
2025	Songwriter of the Year, Non-Classical	"Am I Okay?", "Go to Hell", "Heaven by Noon", "Lies Lies Lies", "Messed Up as Me", "Never Left Me", "No Caller ID", "Sorry Mom", "Two Hearts"	Nominated	
