= Mackenzie Carpenter =

Country musician

MacKenzie Carpenter
- Carpenter in 2025

Background information
- Born: 1999 (age 26–27); Hull, Georgia, U.S.
- Genre: Country
- Occupation: Singer-songwriter
- Years active: 2022–present
- Label: Valory Music Co.
- Website: www.mackenziecarpentermusic.com

Mackenzie Carpenter is an American country musician and songwriter. Born in 1999 in Hull, Georgia, she has released two albums, Mackenzie Carpenter in 2023 and Hey Country Queen in 2025. Carpenter graduated from Belmont University in the 2020s, and is a platinum-selling songwriter.

== Critical reception ==
LB Cantrell of MusicRow magazine stated that "Carpenter, who co-wrote every song on the album, delivers a confident, dynamic project packed with standout tracks, including the previously-released fan-favorites "Dozen Red Flags," "Sound of a Heartbreak," "Only Girl" and "Jesus, I'm Jealous" going on to profess that "While each of these songs showcases the Georgia native's sharp songwriting and vocal prowess, the full body of work cements her place as a country star on the rise, ready to claim her lane".

Today's Country Magazine indicates that song "I Wish You Would", performed alongside Midland "carries a dusty barstool vibe that instantly transports your senses to the classic country sound of the 1970s, a pure country gold that matches the familiar brush of Midland's signature feels while being an intriguing departure from Mackenize's".

Country Swag describes the song as an "immediate standout, a perfect dancehall duet that allows Carpenter to riff off of Midland's Mark Wystrach as they play a pair of fated lovers, unable to resist each other amongst the promises of neon lights and endless drinks".

== Discography ==
=== Studio albums ===
List of studio albums, with selected details
Title	Album details
Hey Country Queen	Release date: March 7, 2025; Label: Big Machine; Format: CD, digital download

=== Extended plays ===
List of EPs, with selected details
Title	Album details
Mackenzie Carpenter	Release date: April 14, 2023; Label: Big Machine; Format: Digital download

=== Singles ===
List of singles, with selected peak chart positions
Title	Year	Peak chart positions	Album
Title	Year	US Country Airplay	Album
"I Wish You Would" (featuring Midland)	2025	52	Hey Country Queen

== Awards and nominations ==
Year	Association	Category	Nominated work	Result	Ref.
2026	Academy of Country Music Awards	New Female Artist of the Year	Herself	Nominated	
