= Parmalee discography =

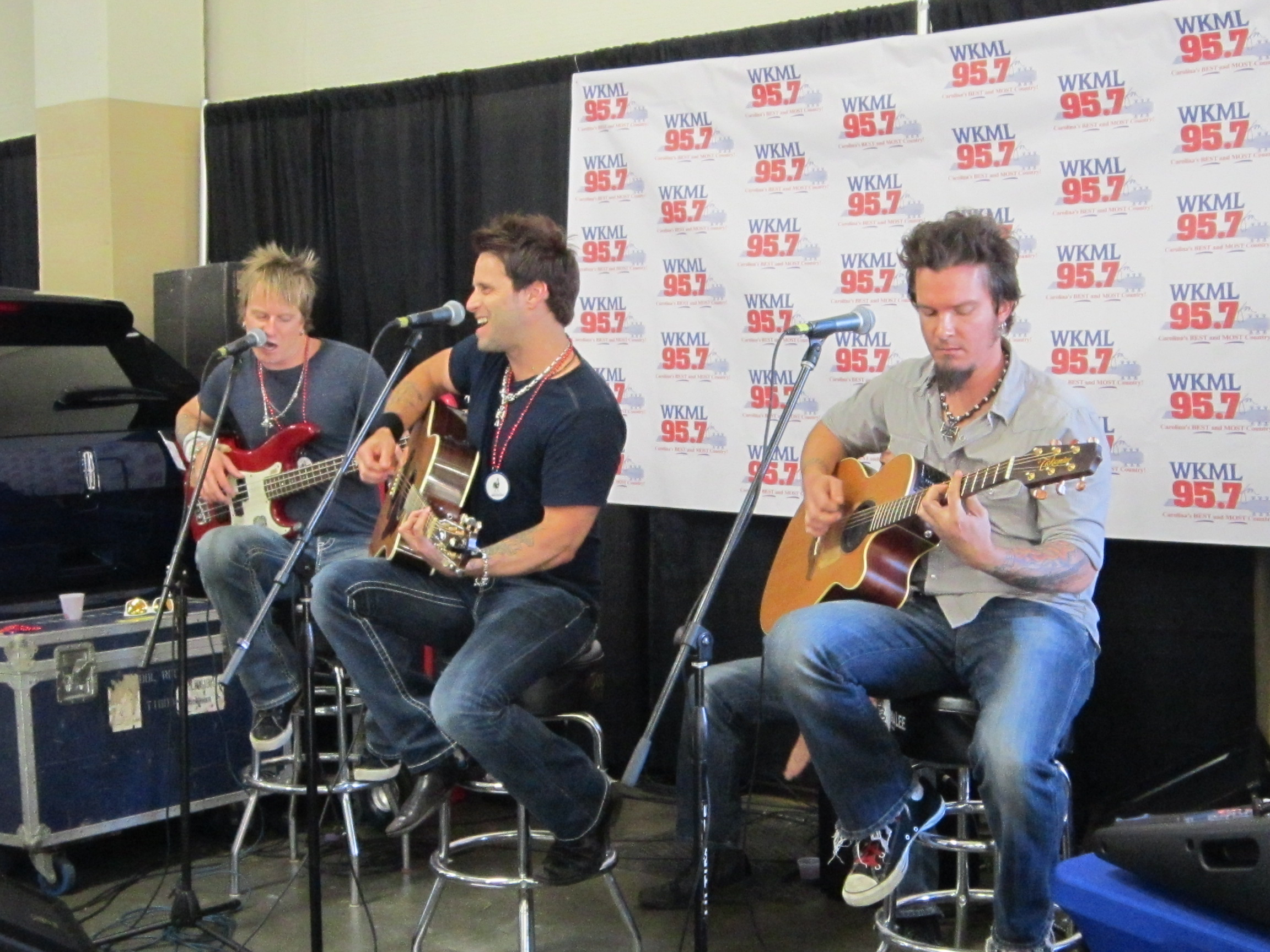
- Parmalee in 2012.
- Studio albums: 6
- EPs: 2
- Singles: 13
- Music videos: 11

American country music band Parmalee has released six studio albums, two extended plays, thirteen singles and eleven music videos. The band independently released two studio albums on the Deep South label before signing to BBR Music Group's Stoney Creek imprint in 2012. That year, they released "Musta Had a Good Time", the lead single to their first BBR album Feels Like Carolina. This album also accounted for "Carolina", their first number-one single on the Billboard Country Airplay charts. 27861, released in 2017, accounted for no successful singles. Between 2019 and 2020, the band returned to number one on the country charts with "Just the Way", a collaboration with Blanco Brown included on Parmalee's third BBR album For You. This was followed by "Take My Name" in 2021 and 2022. For You was reissued in 2022 as For You 2 with bonus tracks, including "Girl in Mine" and "Gonna Love You", their fourth number-one single on Country Airplay.

== Albums ==
=== Studio albums ===
Title	Details	Peak chart positions			Sales
Title	Details	US	US Country	US Indie	Sales
Inside	Release date: June 15, 2004; Label: Deep South	—	—	—	
Mildew or Barbecue?	Release date: December 14, 2006; Label: Deep South	—	—	—	
Feels Like Carolina	Release date: December 10, 2013; Label: Stoney Creek	46	10	5	US: 91,200
27861	Release date: July 21, 2017; Label: Stoney Creek	146	22	10	US: 7,300
For You	Release date: July 30, 2021 (Note: "For You" was originally released on July 30, 2021 as digital-download-only. It was released to CD on October 29, 2021.) (Note: A deluxe edition titled "For You 2" was released on September 22, 2023.); Label: Stoney Creek	—	24	27	
Fell in Love with a Cowgirl	Release date: April 4, 2025; Label: Stoney Creek	—	—	—	
"—" denotes releases that did not chart

== Extended plays ==
List of extended plays
Title	EP details
Daylight	Release date: December 3, 2002; Label: Deep South
Complicated	Release date: May 27, 2008; Label: Deep South

== Singles ==
Title	Year	Peak chart positions					Certifications (sales threshold)	Album
Title	Year	US	US Country	US Country Airplay	CAN	CAN Country	Certifications (sales threshold)	Album
"Musta Had a Good Time"	2012	—	42	38	—	—		Feels Like Carolina
"Carolina"	2013	36	2	1	53	12	RIAA: Platinum	Feels Like Carolina
"Close Your Eyes"	2014	69	11	4	93	16		Feels Like Carolina
"Already Callin' You Mine"	2015	91	16	10	—	33		Feels Like Carolina
"Roots"	2016	—	45	35	—	—		27861
"Sunday Morning"	2017	—	—	39	—	—		27861
"Hotdamalama"	2018	—	—	—	—	—		27861
"Just the Way" (with Blanco Brown)	2019	31	3	1	50	1	RIAA: 2× Platinum; MC: 2× Platinum	For You
"Take My Name"	2021	22	2	1	62	4	RIAA: Platinum; MC: Platinum	For You
"Girl in Mine"	2022	81	19	3	—	8	RIAA: Gold	For You 2
"Gonna Love You"	2023	— (Note: "Gonna Love You" did not enter the Billboard Hot 100, but peaked at number two on the Bubbling Under Hot 100 chart.)	20	1	—	27		For You 2
"Cowgirl"	2025	50	17	1	76	2		Fell in Love with a Cowgirl
"God Knew Better"	2026	—	—	52	—	—		Fell in Love with a Cowgirl
"—" denotes releases that did not chart

== Music videos ==
Year	Video	Director
2012	"Musta Had a Good Time"	Wes Edwards
2013	"Carolina" (live)	Reid Long
2013	"Carolina"	Rhetorik
2014	"Close Your Eyes"	Wes Edwards
2016	"Roots"	Peter Zavadil
2017	"Sunday Morning"	Roger Pistole
2018	"Hotdamalama"	Nathan "Karma" Cox
2019	"Be Alright"	Tyler Adams
2021	"Just the Way" (with Blanco Brown)	Unlisted
2022	"Girl in Mine"	The Edde Brothers
2023	"Gonna Love You"	Unlisted
