= Lindsay Ell discography =

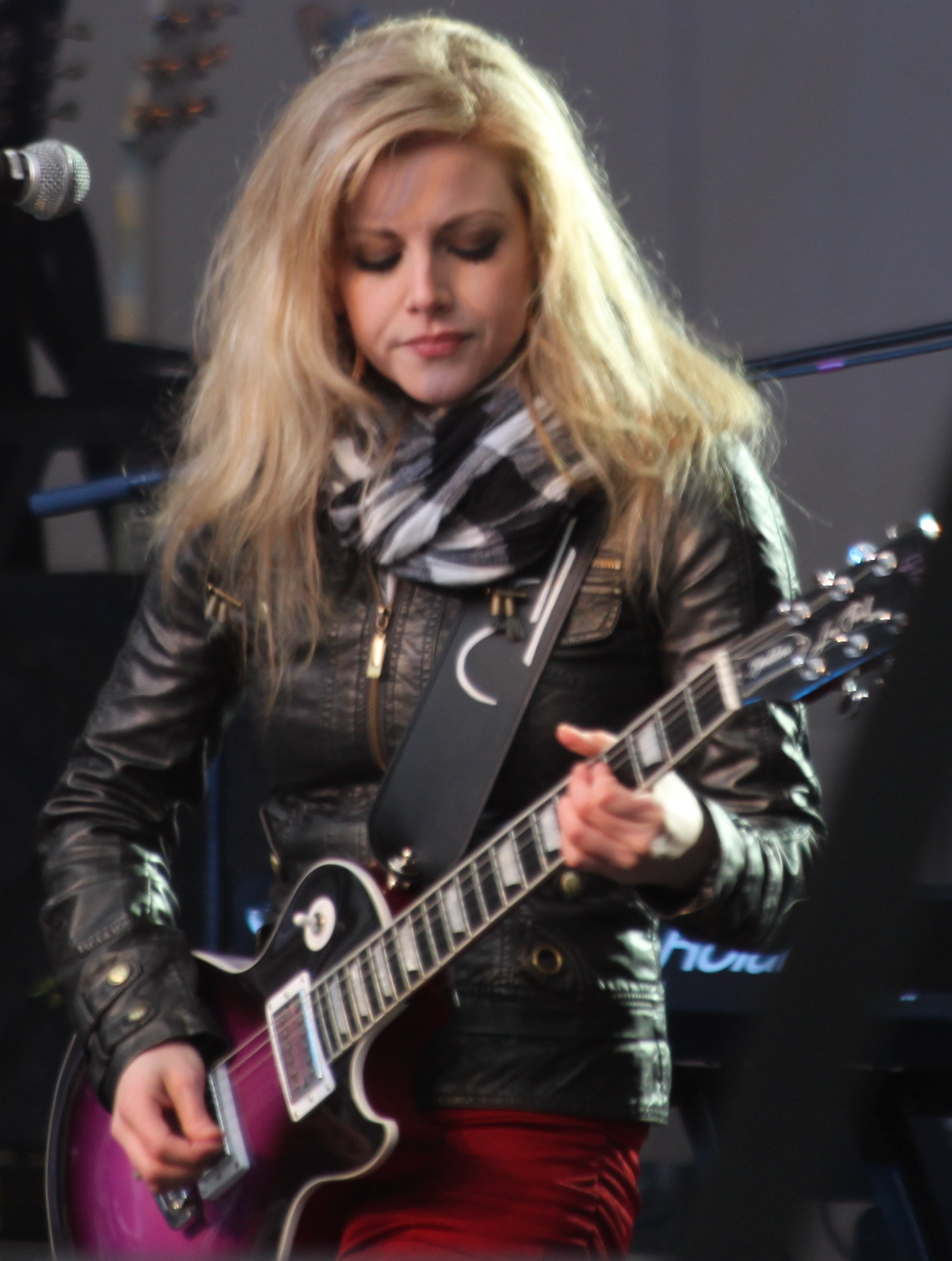
- Studio albums: 5
- EPs: 1
- Singles: 11
- Music videos: 10

Canadian country music singer and songwriter Lindsay Ell has released five studio albums, one extended play, 11 singles, and 10 music videos. Ell released two independent albums in the 2000s before signing a recording contract with the Stoney Creek subsidiary of Broken Bow Records in 2013 and releasing her debut single, "Trippin' on Us". Four subsequent singles were promoted over the following three years with varying levels of success on the Canadian and American country airplay charts.

Ell's first label-supported album, The Project (2017), produced the two top-five singles "Waiting on You" and "Criminal" on the Canada Country chart, with the latter becoming her first number-one in her home country and first top-twenty single in the US. Since then, she has topped the American Country Airplay chart with her Brantley Gilbert duet, "What Happens in a Small Town", and topped the Canada country chart with "Want Me Back".

== Studio albums ==
Title	Details	Peak chart positions					Sales
Title	Details	US	US Country	US Indie	UK Country	UK Indie	Sales
Consider This	Release date: December 31, 2008; Label: Maple Nationwide	—	—	—	—	—	
Alone	Release date: February 2009; Label: Independent	—	—	—	—	—	
The Project	Release date: August 11, 2017; Label: Stoney Creek	40	4	1	18	—	US: 14,600
The Continuum Project	Release date: May 25, 2018; Label: Stoney Creek	—	—	28	—	—	US: 1,100
Heart Theory	Release date: August 14, 2020; Label: Stoney Creek	— (Note: Heart Theory did not enter the Billboard 200, but peaked at number 53 on the Top Album Sales component chart.)	33	38	5	32	
The Love Myself Collection	Release date: November 4, 2025; Label: Universal Music Canada	—	—	—	—	—	
"—" denotes releases that did not chart

== Extended plays ==
Title	Details	Peak chart positions			Sales
Title	Details	US	US Country	US Indie	Sales
Worth the Wait	Release date: March 24, 2017; Label: Stoney Creek	139	28	7	US: 6,300
Love Myself	Release date: October 25, 2024; Label: Universal Music Canada	—	—	—	
Fence Sitter	Release date: October 24, 2025; Label: Universal Music Canada	—	—	—	

== Singles ==
Year	Single	Peak chart positions						Certifications	Album
Year	Single	CAN Country	CAN	AUS Country	US Country Songs	US Country Airplay	US	Certifications	Album
2013	"Trippin' on Us"	14	95	—	—	46	—		Non-album singles
2014	"Pickup Truck"	25	—	—	—	—	—		Non-album singles
2014	"Shut Me Up"	23	—	—	—	47	—		Non-album singles
2015	"By the Way"	14	—	—	— (Note: "By the Way" did not enter the Hot Country Songs chart, but peaked at number 37 on the Country Digital Song Sales component chart.)	44	—		Non-album singles
2016	"All Alright"	9	—	—	—	—	—		Non-album singles
2017	"Waiting on You"	4	—	—	—	42	—		The Project
2017	"Criminal"	1	—	33	28	19	—		The Project
2018	"Champagne"	—	—	—	—	—	—		The Project
2019	"What Happens in a Small Town" (with Brantley Gilbert)	15	— (Note: "What Happens in a Small Town" did not enter the Canadian Hot 100, but peaked at number 39 on the Canadian Digital Song Sales component chart.)	33	7	1	53	US: Gold	Fire and Brimstone
2019	"I Don't Love You"	6	99	—	—	48	—		Heart Theory
2020	"Want Me Back"	1	89	44	35	52	—	MC: Gold	Heart Theory
2021	"Good on You"	10	—	—	—	—	—		Heart Theory
2021	"Can't Do Without Me" (with Chayce Beckham)	—	—	—	—	46	—		Non-album singles
2022	"Right on Time"	8	98	—	—	—	—		Non-album singles
2023	"Sweet Spot"	36	—	—	—	—	—		Non-album singles
2024	"Story I Tell Myself"	—	—	—	—	—	—		Love Myself
"—" denotes releases that did not chart or were not released to that territory / format

=== As a featured artist ===
Year	Single	Peak chart positions		Album
Year	Single	CAN Country	AUS Country	Album
2018	"The Worst Kind" (Tim Hicks featuring Lindsay Ell)	17	—	New Tattoo
2018	"Bittersweet" (Paul Brandt featuring Lindsay Ell)	16	—	The Journey BNA: Vol. 2
2021	"What the Stars See" (Cassadee Pope featuring Karen Fairchild and Lindsay Ell)	—	—	Thrive
2021	"Living Free" (Kaylee Bell featuring Lindsay Ell)	—	23	Silver Linings
"—" denotes releases that did not chart

=== Promotional singles ===
Year	Single	Album
2017	"Good"	The Project
2021	"Hits Me"	Heart Theory
2021	"How Do You Love" (with Cheat Codes and Lee Brice)	One Night in Nashville
2021	"It's Beginning to Look a Lot Like Christmas"	Non-album single

== Music videos ==
Year	Video	Director	Ref.
2013	"Trippin' On Us"	Roman White	
2015	"By the Way"	Desmond Desmarais	
2017	"Waiting on You"	Peter Zavadil	
2018	"Criminal"	Peter Zavadil	
2018	"I Don't Trust Myself (With Loving You)"	Brian Vaughan	
2018	"Dreaming with a Broken Heart"	Brian Vaughan	
2018	"The Worst Kind" (with Tim Hicks)	Ben Knechtel	
2018	"In Repair"		
2019	"What Happens in a Small Town" (with Brantley Gilbert)	Shaun Silva	
2020	"I Don't Love You"	Justin Keys	

== Other appearances ==
List of non-single appearances, showing year released, other artist(s) and album name
Title	Year	Artist(s)	Album	Ref.
"Abandon Ship"	2008	Jonathan Li	If You Thought You Knew	
"Netflix Love Song"	2016	Bobby Bones and the Raging Idiots	The Critics Give It 5 Stars	
"Horses"	2018	Keith Urban	Graffiti U	
"Stumble Home"	2018	The Vamps	Night & Day (Day Edition: Extra Tracks)	
"Distracted"	2019	Cassadee Pope (with Lauren Alaina and RaeLynn)	Stages	
