= Feels Like Carolina =

Studio album by Parmalee
- Released: December 10, 2013
- Genre: Country
- Length: 40:29
- Label: Stoney Creek Records
- Producer: New Voice Entertainment

Parmalee chronology
Feels Like Carolina (2013)	27861 (2017)

Singles from Feels Like Carolina
- 1. "Musta Had a Good Time" Released: July 9, 2012; 2. "Carolina" Released: February 4, 2013; 3. "Close Your Eyes" Released: February 3, 2014; 4. "Already Callin' You Mine" Released: February 2, 2015

Feels Like Carolina is the fifth studio album and major label debut by American country music group Parmalee. It was released on December 10, 2013 by Stoney Creek Records. The album produced four singles: "Musta Had a Good Time", "Carolina", "Close Your Eyes", and "Already Callin' You Mine".

== Critical reception ==
Professional ratings
Review scores
Source	Rating
AllMusic	4/5 stars
Country Weekly	B−
Digital Journal	4.5/5 stars
Got Country Online	4.5/5 stars
Newsday	B+
USA Today	2.5/4 stars

Feels Like Carolina garnered generally positive reception by music critics. Joseph Hudak of Country Weekly gave the album a B− grade, praising the lyrics by saying that "While the album draws liberally from the country pool of shopworn images…the guys…have a knack for making them their own." He thought that the songs written by the band members were the strongest tracks but criticized the "prevailingly generic sound". At USA Today, Brian Mansfield rated the album two-and-a-half out of four stars, feeling that "these guys are a throwback to bands that fleshed out melodies and tight harmonies and classic rock guitar riffs." Glenn Gamboa of Newsday gave the album a B+ grade, calling the album "well-crafted". At Allmusic, Steve Leggett rated the album four out of five stars, noting the release "shows a band that, at its best, combines gritty Southern garage rock with lead singer Matt Thomas' pure country vocals." Markos Papadatos of Digital Journal rated the album four-and-a-half out of five stars, affirming that the release was "solid from start to finish." At Got Country Online, Tara Toro rated the album four-and-a-half out of five stars, stating that as a listener, they "can listen to from start to finish." Matt Bjorke of Roughstock wrote an unrated review of the album, writing that the album "showcases a tight band with a strong ear for melodies and lyrics which suit the same part of the genre which is also home to Eric Church and Jason Aldean, among others."

== Track listing ==
No.	Title	Writer(s)	Length
1.	"Musta Had a Good Time"	Matt Thomas, Scott Thomas, Josh McSwain, Barry Knox, David Fanning	3:35
2.	"Day Drinkin'"	M. Thomas, Blair Daly	3:14
3.	"Move"	Arlis Albriton, Brandon Kinney, Ben Daniel	3:19
4.	"Close Your Eyes"	Adam Craig, Trent Tomlinson, Shane Minor	3:34
5.	"Dance"	M. Thomas, Knox, Tommy Cecil, Landis Frier	3:12
6.	"Carolina"	M. Thomas, S. Thomas, McSwain, Knox, Rick Beato	3:21
7.	"Think You Oughta Know That"	M. Thomas, Jason Sever, Rachel Thibodeau	3:04
8.	"Back in the Day"	Chris Janson, Jaron Boyer, Ben Stennis, Preston Brust	3:17
9.	"My Montgomery"	Kyle Jacobs, Ben Glover, Randy Montana	4:07
10.	"Already Callin' You Mine"	M. Thomas, S. Thomas, Knox, Phil O'Donnell, Wade Kirby	3:04
11.	"I'll Bring the Music"	Keith Anderson, Craig Wiseman	3:23
12.	"Another Day Gone"	M. Thomas, S. Thomas, McSwain, Knox, Bobby Pinson	3:19

== Personnel ==
Parmalee

- Barry Knox - bass guitar, background vocals
- Josh McSwain - electric guitar, keyboards, background vocals
- Matt Thomas - acoustic guitar, electric guitar, lead vocals
- Scott Thomas - drums, percussion

Additional Musicians

- Kurt Allison - electric guitar
- Smith Curry - dobro
- Dan Dugmore - steel guitar
- David Fanning - programming
- Tony Harrell - keyboards
- Mike Johnson - steel guitar
- Tully Kennedy - bass guitar
- Rob McNelly - electric guitar
- Jason Mowery - banjo, fiddle, mandolin
- Russ Pahl - steel guitar
- Danny Rader - banjo, bouzouki, acoustic guitar
- Rich Redmond - percussion, programming
- Adam Shoenfeld - electric guitar

== Chart performance ==
=== Weekly charts ===
The album debuted on Billboard 200 at No. 46 with sales of 14,000. The album has sold 91,200 copies in the U.S. as of February 2015.

Chart (2013–14)	Peak position
US Billboard 200	46
US Top Country Albums (Billboard)	10
US Independent Albums (Billboard)	5

=== Year-end charts ===
Chart (2014)	Position
US Top Country Albums (Billboard)	66
US Independent Albums (Billboard)	45

=== Singles ===
Year	Single	Peak chart positions				
Year	Single	US Country	US Country Airplay	US	CAN Country	CAN
2012	"Musta Had a Good Time"	42	38	—	—	—
2013	"Carolina"	2	1	36	12	53
2014	"Close Your Eyes"	11	4	69	16	93
2015	"Already Callin' You Mine"	16	10	91	33	—
"—" denotes releases that did not chart
