= For You (Parmalee album) =

Studio album by Parmalee
- Released: July 30, 2021
- Genre: Country
- Length: 37:55
- Label: Stoney Creek
- Producers: David Fanning (all tracks); Andrew Goldstein (track 7); Kevin Bard (track 7)

Parmalee chronology
27861 (2017)	For You (2021)	Fell in Love with a Cowgirl (2025)

Singles from For You
- 1. "Just the Way" Released: December 13, 2019; 2. "Take My Name" Released: October 4, 2021; 3. "Girl in Mine" Released: August 22, 2022; 4. "Gonna Love You" Released: October 30, 2023

For You is the seventh studio album by American country music band Parmalee. It was released on July 30, 2021, via Stoney Creek Records. It includes the singles "Just the Way" and "Take My Name".

Preceded by the single "Girl in Mine", a deluxe reissue of the record titled For You 2 was released on September 22, 2023.

== Content ==
"Just the Way", featuring Blanco Brown, was released as the lead single on December 13, 2019. It has been certified Platinum by the RIAA and MC. Its second single, "Take My Name", was released on October 4, 2021.

== Critical reception ==
Stephen Thomas Erlewine of AllMusic praised the album as a "seamless piece of a product" in which the band don't simply "harmonize on sweet, sticky melodies."

== Commercial performance ==
For You debuted at number 35 on the Top Country Albums chart in 2021 and number 43 on the Independent Albums chart. It reached a peak of #24 in June 2022.

== Track listing ==
No.	Title	Writer(s)	Length
1.	"Only You"	Matt Thomas; David Fanning; Justin Wilson	3:05
2.	"Just the Way" (featuring Blanco Brown)	M. Thomas; Kevin Bard; Nolan Sipe	3:13
3.	"Backroad Girl"	M. Thomas; Tommy Cecil; Blake Bollinger; Brinley Addington	3:02
4.	"Take My Name"	M. Thomas; Ashley Gorley; Fanning; Ben Johnson	2:37
5.	"I Do"	M. Thomas; Tyler Hubbard; Corey Crowder; Fanning	2:40
6.	"Miss You Now"	Michael Tyler; Matthew McGinn; Fanning	2:27
7.	"Greatest Hits" (featuring FITZ)	M. Thomas; Bard; Sipe; Andrew Goldstein; Michael Fitzpatrick	3:04
8.	"Better with You"	M. Thomas; Gorley; Fanning	2:41
9.	"Forget You" (featuring Avery Anna)	M. Thomas; Shane Minor; Fanning; Thomas Archer	2:57
10.	"Alone Like That"	M. Thomas; Tommy Cecil; Fanning; James McNair	2:54
11.	"I See You"	M. Thomas; Fanning; Wilson; Steven McMorron	3:16
12.	"I'll Take the Chevy"	M. Thomas; Josh McSwain; Barry Knox; Zachary Kale; McNair; Josh Mirenda	3:06
13.	"For You"	M. Thomas; Knox; McSwain; Scott Thomas; Fanning	2:53
Total length:			37:55

For You 2 – Bonus tracks
No.	Title	Writer(s)	Length
14.	"Girl in Mine"	M. Thomas; Casey Brown; Fanning; Travis Wood	2:35
15.	"Gonna Love You"	M. Thomas; Abram Dean; Andy Sheridan; Fanning	2:58
16.	"Is It Just Me"	M. Thomas; Gorley; Johnson; Fanning; Hunter Phelps	2:44
17.	"Boyfriend"	M. Thomas; Gorley; Johnson; Fanning; Phelps; Michael Hardy	2:18
18.	"Wish You Never Loved Me"	M. Thomas; Sheridan; Gorley; Fanning	3:11
Total length:			51:41

== Personnel ==
Adapted from For You liner notes.

=== Parmalee ===
- Barry Knox – background vocals
- Josh McSwain – piano, synthesizer, background vocals
- Matt Thomas – lead vocals, background vocals

Scott Thomas, Parmalee's drummer, does not play on this album.

=== Additional musicians ===
- Avery Anna – duet vocals and background vocals on "Forget You"
- Kevin Bard – acoustic guitar, programming
- Kenny Barnes – programming
- Eli Beaird – bass guitar
- Blake Bollinger – programming
- Blanco Brown – duet vocals on "Just the Way"
- Corey Crowder – acoustic guitar
- Kris Donegan – acoustic guitar, electric guitar
- David Fanning – programming
- Michael Fitzpatrick – percussion, duet vocals, and background vocals on "Greatest Hits"
- Andrew Goldstein – acoustic guitar, keyboards, programming
- Kenny Greenberg – electric guitar
- Mark Hill – bass guitar
- Evan Hutchings – drums, percussion
- King 80 Industries – programming
- Ben Johnson – programming
- Zach Kale – programming, background vocals
- Sol Philcox-Littlefield – electric guitar
- Matt McGinn – background vocals
- Pat McGrath – acoustic guitar
- James McNair – background vocals
- Rob McNelley – electric guitar
- Miles McPherson – drums
- Luke Moseley – piano
- Sweet Legacy Music – programming
- Justin Ostrander – electric guitar
- Michael Rinne – bass guitar
- Jeff Roach – piano
- Scotty Sanders – steel guitar
- Justin Schipper – steel guitar
- Bryan Sutton – acoustic guitar
- Ilya Toshinsky – acoustic guitar, electric guitar
- Justin Wilson – background vocals
- Alex Wright – keyboards, piano

== Chart performance ==
=== Weekly charts ===
Weekly chart performance for For You
Chart (2021–2022)	Peak position
US Top Country Albums (Billboard)	24
US Independent Albums (Billboard)	27

=== Year-end charts ===
Year-end chart performance for For You 2
Chart (2024)	Position
Australian Country Albums (ARIA)	92

== Release history ==
Region	Date	Label	Format	Ref.
United States	July 30, 2021	Stoney Creek	Digital download; Streaming	
United States	October 29, 2021	Stoney Creek	CD	
