= Just a Phase =

Just a Phase may refer to:

- "Just a Phase", a song by Incubus on the album Morning View
- "Just a Phase", a song by Adam Craig
