= Heart Theory =

Studio album by Lindsay Ell
- Released: August 14, 2020
- Recorded: 2019–2020
- Length: 39:37
- Label: Stoney Creek
- Producer: Dann Huff

Lindsay Ell chronology
The Continuum Project (2018)	Heart Theory (2020)

Singles from Heart Theory
- 1. "I Don't Love You" Released: December 9, 2019; 2. "Want Me Back" Released: July 13, 2020; 3. "Good on You" Released: March 11, 2021

Heart Theory (stylized in all lowercase) is the fifth studio album recorded by Canadian singer and songwriter Lindsay Ell. It was released August 14, 2020 through Stoney Creek Records. The album is Ell's first full-length body of original work since her label-supported debut The Project in 2017. Heart Theory is a loose concept album whose tracks explore the seven stages of grief.

== Content ==
The track listing for Heart Theory goes through the seven stages of grief in order, as follows: shock ("Hits Me"), denial ("How Good" and "I Don't Love You"), anger ("Want Me Back", "Get Over You", and "Wrong Girl"), bargaining ("Body Language of a Breakup"), depression ("Good on You"), testing ("The Other Side" and "Go To"), and acceptance ("Make You" and "Ready to Love"). The majority of the songs lyrically explore the impact of various forms of heartbreak on Ell's personal life. "Make You" was the last song written for the album and references Ell's past experiences with sexual abuse; she established the "Make You Movement Fund" supporting at-risk youth, domestic abuse and sexual assault survivors in conjunction with the song's release on July 7, 2020.

== Singles ==
"I Don't Love You" was released for download and streaming on November 8, 2019. It was serviced to American country radio on December 9, 2019 as the album's lead single. "I Don't Love You" became Ell's second career entry on the Billboard Canadian Hot 100, peaking at number 99, and became her fourth top-ten hit on the Canada Country airplay chart with a peak position of 6. Conversely, the song peaked at number 48 on the American Billboard Country Airplay chart, becoming her lowest-charting single in that country.

The album's second single, "Want Me Back", was released June 25, 2020 and impacted American country radio on July 13, 2020. It was the most-added song at country radio in the United States during its official add week. The song experienced high consumption among consumers during the release week for Heart Theory and resultantly debuted at number 35 on the Hot Country Songs chart.

== Critical reception ==
American Songwriter wrote that Heart Theory was a "career-altering, masterpiece of an album" that takes "rising artist" Ell "into legendary territory." Mae Trumata of The Upcoming rated the album three stars out of five and wrote that the relatable nature of the songs was a "double-edged sword... that downplays Ell and her music's individuality."

== Commercial performance ==
In the United States, Heart Theory failed to enter the Billboard 200 but did debut at number 53 on the Top Album Sales component chart. The album also entered the Top Country Albums and Independent Albums charts at numbers 33 and 38, respectively.

Heart Theory was Ell's first release to chart in the United Kingdom. It did not enter the UK Albums Chart, but did enter the subsidiary UK Album Downloads Chart at number 39. Heart Theory also entered the UK Country Albums and UK Independent Albums charts at numbers 5 and 32, respectively.

== Track listing ==
Heart Theory track listing
No.	Title	Writer(s)	Length
1.	"Hits Me"	Lindsay Ell; Tyler Hubbard; Corey Crowder	3:29
2.	"How Good"	Ell; Brandy Clark	2:42
3.	"I Don't Love You"	Adam Hambrick; Melissa Fuller; Neil Medley	3:34
4.	"Want Me Back"	Ell; Kane Brown; Matt McGinn; Lindsay Rimes	3:13
5.	"Get Over You"	Ell; Gordie Sampson; Kelly Archer	3:04
6.	"Wrong Girl"	Ell; Steph Jones; McGinn; Luke Niccoli	2:36
7.	"Body Language of a Breakup"	Ell; Laura Veltz; Sam Ellis	3:42
8.	"Good on You"	Ell; Ellis; Micah Premnath	3:17
9.	"The Other Side"	Ell; Jessie Jo Dillon; McGinn	3:09
10.	"Go To"	Ell; Nicolle Gaylon; Jordan Reynolds	3:18
11.	"Make You"	Ell; Clark	4:18
12.	"Ready to Love"	Ell; Dillon; McGinn; Joey Hyde	3:15
Total length:			39:37

Notes

- Titles are stylized in all lowercase except as noted below, with the capital letters used to spell out the album title:
  - "Hits Me" is stylized in sentence case
  - "I Don't Love You" is stylized as "i don't lovE you"
  - "Want Me Back" is stylized as "wAnt me back"
  - "Get Over You" is stylized as "get oveR you"
  - "The Other Side" is stylized as "The oTHEr side"
  - "Go To" is stylized as "gO to"
  - "Ready to Love" is stylized as "ReadY to love"

== Personnel ==
Adapted from AllMusic.

- Ben Caver – background vocals
- Dave Cohen – keyboards
- Lindsay Ell – acoustic guitar, electric guitar, synthesizer bass, lead vocals, background vocals
- Fred Eltringham – drums
- Eric Fortaleza – bass guitar
- Paul Franklin – steel guitar
- Sara Haze – background vocals
- Dann Huff – banjo, bouzouki, acoustic guitar, electric guitar, Hammond B-3 organ, keyboards, mandolin, percussion, piano, programming, synthesizer, synthesizer bass
- David Huff – percussion, programming
- Charlie Judge – keyboards, strings
- David LaBruyere – bass guitar
- Rob McNelley – electric guitar
- Jimmie Lee Sloas –bass guitar
- Aaron Sterling – drums
- Ilya Toshinsky – acoustic guitar, electric guitar
- Travis Toy – steel guitar
- Derek Wells – electric guitar

== Charts ==
Chart performance for Heart Theory
Chart (2020)	Peak position
US Independent Albums (Billboard)	38
US Top Album Sales (Billboard)	53
US Top Country Albums (Billboard)	33
UK Country Albums (Official Charts)	5
UK Album Downloads (Official Charts)	39
UK Independent Albums (Official Charts)	32
