= Trippin' on Us =

Single by Lindsay Ell
- Released: November 5, 2013
- Genre: Country
- Length: 2:43
- Label: Stoney Creek
- Songwriter(s): Lindsay Ell; David Fanning; Vicky McGehee
- Producer(s): New Voice Entertainment

Lindsay Ell singles chronology
"Trippin' on Us" (2013)	"Pickup Truck" (2014)

"Trippin' on Us" is the debut single released by Canadian country music singer Lindsay Ell. The song was written by Ell with David Fanning and Vicky McGehee. "Trippin' on Us" was released to digital retailers through Stoney Creek Records on November 5, 2013. It was serviced to American country radio on December 16, 2013, and was the most-added single that week.

== Critical reception ==
Billy Dukes of Taste of Country wrote that "Trippin' on Us" lets Ell "shine as a singer and storyteller," and that her unassuming but confident delivery "gives depth to a simple love story."

== Chart performance ==
"Trippin' on Us" entered the Canada Country airplay chart in December 2013 and reached a peak position of 14 on the chart dated March 8, 2014. The song also debuted and peaked at number 95 on the Canadian Hot 100 chart dated March 8, 2014. As of 2017, it remains Ell's only Hot 100 hit. In the United States, "Trippin' on Us" debuted at number 58 on the Billboard Country Airplay chart dated January 25, 2014. It reached a peak position of 46 on the chart dated March 8, 2014.

== Music video ==
The official music video for "Trippin' on Us" premiered February 23, 2014. Directed by Roman White, the video tells the love story of Ell and a "tall, dark, and handsome" love interest.

== Charts ==
Chart (2013–14)	Peak position
Canada (Canadian Hot 100)	95
Canada Country (Billboard)	14
US Country Airplay (Billboard)	46

== Release history ==
Country	Date	Format	Label	Ref.
Worldwide	November 5, 2013	Digital download	Stoney Creek	
United States	December 16, 2013	Country radio	Stoney Creek	
