= 27861 =

Studio album by Parmalee
- Released: July 21, 2017
- Genre: Country
- Label: Stoney Creek
- Producers: David Fanning, Parmalee

Parmalee chronology
Feels Like Carolina (2013)	27861 (2017)	For You (2021)

Singles from 27861
- 1. "Roots" Released: April 11, 2016; 2. "Sunday Morning" Released: May 1, 2017; 3. "Hotdamalama" Released: April 23, 2018

27861 is the sixth studio album by American country music group Parmalee. It was released on July 21, 2017.

== Background ==
Parmalee had first released the lead single from the album, "Roots", on April 11, 2016, however it only reached No. 35 on Country Airplay. The lead singer of Parmalee Matt Thomas then started to co-write a number of new songs with other songwriters, such as Craig Wiseman, Jim Beavers, Josh Osborne, busbee, and Tom Douglas. The group also decided to co-produce these new tracks through their own initiative with other producers, primarily Tommy Cecil and Brock Berryhill. One of these new songs, "Sunday Morning", was released to radio as the second single on May 1, 2017. The songs from the album were recorded in five different locations, including Pegram Palace, where the Thomas brothers live.

The number 27861 is the postal code of Parmele, the hometown of the group. Each of the four bandmembers has a tattoo of those digits. Matt Thomas said: "We've had that album title for a while; we've really been wanting to use it. We just felt like now was the time to use it".

== Commercial performance ==
The album debuted at No. 22 on the Billboard's Top Country Albums chart, selling 3,800 copies in the first week. As of September 2017, it has sold 7,300 copies in the United States.

== Track listing ==
No.	Title	Writer(s)	Length
1.	"Sunday Morning"	Matt Thomas, Ross Copperman, Josh Osborne	2:50
2.	"American Nights"	Thomas, Tommy Cecil, Jay Brunswick, Frank Rogers	3:13
3.	"Heartbreaker"	Brock Berryhill, Brunswick, Jason Blaine	3:09
4.	"Like a Photograph"	Thomas, Andrew Dorff, busbee	2:50
5.	"Back in the Game"	Rodney Clawson, Hillary Lindsey, Matt Dragstrem	3:07
6.	"Mimosas"	Thomas, Cecil, Jared Mullins	3:05
7.	"Hotdamalama"	Thomas, Cecil, Craig Wiseman	3:10
8.	"A Guy Meets a Girl"	Thomas, Chase McGill, Jessie Jo Dillon	2:55
9.	"Savannah"	Thomas, Tom Douglas, Zachary Maloy	3:43
10.	"Drink It Off"	Thomas, Jim Beavers, Lindsay Rimes	2:46
11.	"Barrel of a Shot Glass"	Barry Knox, David Fanning, Ben Stennis	3:09
12.	"Roots"	Mullins, Stennis, Blake Bollinger	3:01

== Personnel ==
- Barry Knox - bass guitar, backing vocals
- Josh McSwain - electric guitar, keyboards, backing vocals
- Matt Thomas - acoustic guitar, electric guitar, lead vocals
- Scott Thomas - drums, percussion
- Josh Osborne – backing vocals

== Charts ==
Chart (2017)	Peak position
US Billboard 200	146
US Top Country Albums (Billboard)	22
US Independent Albums (Billboard)	10

=== Singles ===
Year	Single	Peak chart positions	
Year	Single	US Country	US Country Airplay
2016	"Roots"	45	35
2017	"Sunday Morning"	—	39
"—" denotes releases that did not chart

== Music videos ==
Year	Video	Director
2016	"Roots"	Peter Zavadil
