= Girl in Mine =

Single by Parmalee

from the album For You 2
- Released: August 12, 2022
- Genre: Country
- Length: 2:33
- Label: BBR
- Songwriters: Ashley Gorley; Casey Brown; David Fanning; Matt Thomas; Travis Wood
- Producer: David Fanning

Parmalee singles chronology
"Take My Name" (2022)	"Girl in Mine" (2022)	"Gonna Love You" (2023)

"Girl in Mine" is a song by American country music band Parmalee. It was released on August 12, 2022, and was included on the deluxe version of the band's third studio album For You, titled For You 2. The song was co-written by the band's lead singer Matt Thomas along with Ashley Gorley, Casey Brown, David Fanning, and Travis Wood.

== Content and history ==
An uncredited Taste of Country article described the song as an "easy, breezy track" with comparable romantic themes to their previous singles "Just the Way" and "Take My Name". The band members told the same publication that they chose to release it independently of an album, and by doing so, they had seen it become popular by fans sharing it on TikTok.

Matt Thomas, Parmalee's lead singer, wrote the song with Ashley Gorley, Casey Brown, Travis Wood, and David Fanning, who also produced it.

== Chart performance ==
=== Weekly charts ===
Weekly chart performance for "Girl in Mine"
Chart (2022–2023)	Peak position
Canada Country (Billboard)	8
US Billboard Hot 100	81
US Country Airplay (Billboard)	3
US Hot Country Songs (Billboard)	19

=== Year-end charts ===
Year-end chart performance
Chart (2023)	Position
US Country Airplay (Billboard)	8
US Hot Country Songs (Billboard)	44
US Radio Songs (Billboard)	75

== Certifications ==
Region	Certification	Certified units/sales
United States (RIAA)	Gold	500,000^{‡}
^{‡} Sales+streaming figures based on certification alone.
