= Honeysuckle & Lightning Bugs =

Studio album by Blanco Brown
- Released: October 11, 2019
- Genre: Country rap; trap
- Length: 33:01
- Label: TrailerTrapMusic; BBR
- Producer: Abraham Abushmais; Bennie Amey III; Quintin Amey; Blanco "The Ear"; James Brabham; Isaiah Brown; Sam DiCesare; Ken Fambro; Corey Marquez Stephens; Liby Vongmanee; John Whitfield

Blanco Brown chronology
Blanco Brown (2019)	Honeysuckle & Lightning Bugs (2019)

Singles from Honeysuckle & Lightning Bugs
- 1. "The Git Up" Released: May 3, 2019

Honeysuckle & Lightning Bugs is the debut studio album by American rapper Blanco Brown, released on October 11, 2019, by TrailerTrapMusic and BMG Rights Management. It features the single "The Git Up" and all four tracks from his debut EP Blanco Brown (2019).

== Critical reception ==
Rating it 1.5 out of 5 stars, Stephen Thomas Erlewine of AllMusic thought that the combination of country music and trap music elements made the album "sluggish" and "threadbare". He wrote in his review that the production choices "give the album a heavy, dour blandness that doesn't sit well with Brown's decision to signify his country roots by ratcheting up the sentimentality".

== Commercial performance ==
The album debuted on Top Country Albums at No. 16, with 1,200 copies sold the first week. It has sold 4,100 copies in the United States as of January 2020.

== Track listing ==
No.	Title	Writer(s)	Length
1.	"Temporary Insanity"	Bennie Amey III	4:02
2.	"HeadNod"	Amey III, Sam DiCesare, Abraham Abushmais, Ken Fambro	2:44
3.	"Funky Tonk"	Amey III, Bennie Amey Jr., Quintin Amey, James Brabham	3:02
4.	"CountryTime"	Abushmais, Amey Jr., Amey III, DiCesare	4:00
5.	"Georgia Power"	Amey III, Dominic Crawford, Isaiah Brown, John Whitfield	3:43
6.	"Gemini (Damn Right)"	Amey III, Quintin Amey	3:21
7.	"Ghett Ol Memories"	Amey III, Corey Marquez Stephens, Liby Vongmanee	2:40
8.	"Don't Love Her"	Amey III, DiCesare	2:51
9.	"Tn Whiskey"	Amey III	3:18
10.	"The Git Up"	Amey III	3:20
Total length:			33:01

== Charts ==
Chart (2019)	Peak position
Australian Digital Albums (ARIA)	10
Canadian Albums (Billboard)	58
US Billboard 200	130
US Top Country Albums (Billboard)	16

== Certifications ==
Region	Certification	Certified units/sales
New Zealand (RMNZ)	Gold	7,500^{‡}
United States (RIAA)	Gold	500,000^{‡}
^{‡} Sales+streaming figures based on certification alone.
