= Criminal (Lindsay Ell song) =

Single by Lindsay Ell

from the album The Project
- Released: December 11, 2017
- Recorded: 2016
- Genre: Country rock
- Length: 3:22
- Label: Stoney Creek
- Songwriter(s): Lindsay Ell; Fred Wilhelm; Chris Stevens
- Producer(s): Kristian Bush

Lindsay Ell singles chronology
"Waiting on You" (2017)	"Criminal" (2017)	"The Worst Kind" (2018)

"Criminal" is a song recorded by Canadian country music singer Lindsay Ell for her third studio album, The Project (2017). Ell co-wrote the song with Fred Wilhelm and Chris Stevens, while Kristian Bush of Sugarland produced the track. It was released to American country radio on December 11, 2017 through Stoney Creek Records as the album's second single.

"Criminal" peaked at numbers 19 and 28 on the Billboard Country Airplay and Hot Country Songs charts, respectively, marking Ell's first top 40 single on the former and first charting entry on the latter. In Canada, the song also peaked at number one on the Canada Country chart, becoming the first single by a Canadian solo female artist to do so since 2008.

== Composition ==
"Criminal" is a guitar-driven country rock song whose production has been described as more "accessible" than Ell's previous singles. Lyrically, the song describes the "early torment" of a surprising new love and compares the stealing of her heart to literal theft. Ell elaborated to Radio.com that she wrote the song about being grateful for the way some people, "will walk into your life, and you don't really know where they came from or how they came at the time they did," and that the criminal allegory is a "really happy" one. It was one of the first songs written for The Project, and Ell told KNIX-FM that she "knew ["Criminal"] was going to be important to me and my career," when it was recorded in 2016.

== Release and promotion ==
"Criminal" was announced as the follow-up to her breakthrough single, "Waiting on You", in November 2017. It was made available to country radio in the United States through PlayMPE on November 17, 2017 and received 10 adds. The song was officially promoted to radio on December 11, 2017. For that week, the song was picked up by an additional 51 radio stations and served as the week's most-added single.

== Critical reception ==
Billy Dukes of Taste of Country complimented the song's "made-for-radio" production and wrote that Ell's vocals on the track were "nothing short of convincing." Kelly Brickey of Sounds Like Nashville wrote that Ell "gets away with murder in the sweetest way," on "Criminal" and praised the way she "put[s] her heart and soul on the line." In a review of her performance of the song at 2017's "Next Women of Country" showcase, Samantha Stevens of CMT wrote that "[Ell's] pure and sweet vocal tone and clever use of imagery and play on words are what makes her songs so catchy and lovable."

== Music video ==
The music video was directed by Peter Zavadil and premiered on CMT, GAC & VEVO in April 2018.

== Chart performance ==
"Criminal" debuted at number 54 on the Billboard Country Airplay chart dated December 23, 2017 and was the week's highest-debuting single. The song became Ell's first top 40 hit the following week, when the song rose from 54 to 40. It has since reached a peak position of 19 and is Ell's highest-charting single to date. "Criminal" debuted at number 47 on the Hot Country Songs chart dated January 27, 2018. The song is Ell's first entry on the multi-metric chart. It has since peaked at number 28. In Canada, "Criminal" reached number one on the Canada Country airplay chart. This made it Ell's first number one, as well as the first single by a solo female artist to reach the top position on that chart since Terri Clark's "In My Next Life" in 2008.

== Charts ==
=== Weekly charts ===
Chart (2017–2018)	Peak position
Australia Country Hot 50 (TMN)	33
Canada Country (Billboard)	1
US Hot Country Songs (Billboard)	28
US Country Airplay (Billboard)	19

=== Year-end charts ===
Chart (2018)	Position
US Country Airplay (Billboard)	57
US Hot Country Songs (Billboard)	77
