= By the Way (Lindsay Ell song) =

Single by Lindsay Ell
- Released: October 1, 2015
- Genre: Country
- Length: 2:59
- Label: Stoney Creek
- Songwriter(s): Barry Dean; Lindsay Ell; Luke Laird
- Producer(s): Ben Glover

Lindsay Ell singles chronology
"Shut Me Up" (2014)	"By the Way" (2015)	"All Alright" (2016)

Music video
- "By the Way" on YouTube

"By the Way" is a single by Canadian country singer Lindsay Ell. Written by Ell with Barry Dean and Luke Laird, the song was released in October 2015 and reached the country charts of the U.S. and Canada.

== Composition ==
In a 2016 interview with Radio.com, Ell said "By the Way" was written two years earlier following a breakup. "Eventually I had reached that point where I was not gonna let this boy have an effect on me anymore." Having grown up listening to female empowerment anthems by such artists as Shania Twain and the Dixie Chicks, Ell set out to write a similarly-themed song for a new generation. The lyrics for "By the Way" were completed in three hours. In addition to singing, Ell plays acoustic guitar, electric guitar, ganjo and mandolin on the song.

== Music videos ==
A lyric video for "By the Way" was released in October 2015. It features Ell playing an acoustic guitar while relaxing on her bed. The official music video for the song was released the next month. Directed by Desmond Desmarais, it contains clips of Ell standing and singing in a field as well as playing her guitar inside a recording studio.

== Release and reception ==
To coincide with the release of "By the Way" on October 1, 2015, and to raise money for charity, Ell teamed with CMT Next Women of Country to perform a 24-hour concert titled "Lindsay Ell Busking on Broadway". Chuck Wicks, Charlie Worsham, and Brooke Eden were among the surprise guest appearances.

Taste of Country said that the song is "a little sweeter sounding than her previous releases, but it still has teeth. Don't let the hooky banjo and mandolin combo fool you. This is a good old fashioned man hating song, and there's nothing wrong with that."

== Chart history ==
Chart (2015)	Peak position
Canada Country (Billboard)	14
US Country Airplay (Billboard)	44
US Country Digital Song Sales (Billboard)	37
