= Close Your Eyes (Parmalee song) =

Single by Parmalee

from the album Feels Like Carolina
- Released: February 3, 2014
- Recorded: 2013
- Genre: Country
- Length: 3:34
- Label: Stoney Creek
- Songwriter(s): Adam Craig; Trent Tomlinson; Shane Minor
- Producer(s): New Voice Entertainment

Parmalee singles chronology
"Carolina" (2013)	"Close Your Eyes" (2014)	"Already Callin' You Mine" (2015)

"Close Your Eyes" is a song recorded by American country music group Parmalee. It was released in February 2014 as the third single from their album Feels Like Carolina. The song was written by Adam Craig, Trent Tomlinson, and Shane Minor.

== Critical reception ==
The song received a favorable review from Taste of Country, which said that "this love song is easy to embrace, and even easier to sing along with." Bobby Peacock of Roughstock gave the song four stars out of five, calling it "more detailed than most other songs that tread the same ground" while adding that "lead singer Matt Thomas has a subtle vocal delivery with a hint of Dierks Bentley grain, and the production is tight, with enough electric guitar and drums to give it a pulse, but enough banjo to keep it country."

== Music video ==
The music video was directed by Wes Edwards and premiered in July 2014.

The video shows the band performing on top of a hill, while people prepare for a party and set up a portable water slide. Some women arrive, including one that appears to be the girlfriend of one of the men. The couple undress, before using the slide. The couple is later shown sitting in the back of a pickup truck. People then run towards the area carrying a large thermos box. At night, the couple dance in front of the band, with everyone else. At around two minutes, 56 seconds through, the woman undresses and uses the water slide, while everyone else sits by a fire. When she arrives at the bottom, her boyfriend is there waiting with a towel, ready to dry her. He wraps the towel around her, and the two kiss, concluding the video.

== Chart performance ==
"Close Your Eyes" debuted at number 55 on the U.S. Billboard Country Airplay chart for the week of February 22, 2014. It also debuted at number 49 on the U.S. Billboard Hot Country Songs chart for the week of May 3, 2014. The song has sold 279,000 copies in the U.S. as of January 2015.

The song reached Top 10 on Country Airplay in its 40th week, beating the band's own record set by their previous single "Carolina" for the slowest ascent into that chart's top 10 since the charts were first tracked via Nielsen SoundScan in January 1990.

Chart (2014–2015)	Peak position
Canada (Canadian Hot 100)	93
Canada Country (Billboard)	16
US Billboard Hot 100	69
US Country Airplay (Billboard)	4
US Hot Country Songs (Billboard)	11

=== Year-end charts ===
Chart (2014)	Position
US Country Airplay (Billboard)	46
US Hot Country Songs (Billboard)	53

Chart (2015)	Position
US Country Airplay (Billboard)	70
US Hot Country Songs (Billboard)	86
