= Cowgirl (Parmalee song) =

2025 single by Parmalee

Single by Parmalee

from the album Fell in Love with a Cowgirl
- Released: January 10, 2025
- Recorded: 2024
- Studio: Sound Stage Studio (Nashville, Tennessee)
- Genre: Country
- Length: 3:01
- Label: Stoney Creek
- Songwriters: David Fanning; James Daniel Lewis; Peter Daniel Newman; Robbie Jay; Thomas Frank Ridley Horsley; Matt Thomas; Scott Thomas; Barry Knox; Josh McSwain
- Producers: David Fanning; James Daniel Lewis

Parmalee singles chronology
"Gonna Love You" (2023)	"Cowgirl" (2025)

Music video
- "Cowgirl" on YouTube

"Cowgirl" is a song by American country music band Parmalee, released on January 10, 2025 as the lead single from their eighth studio album, Fell in Love with a Cowgirl (2025). They wrote the song with its producers David Fanning and James Daniel Lewis, Peter Daniel Newman, Robbie Jay and Thomas Frank Ridley Horsley.

== Background ==
Lewis, Newman, Jay and Horsley composed the foundation of the instrumental, including the drumbeat. They shipped off a programmed demo from the United Kingdom to 33 Creative co-owner Tina Crawford, who shared it with Fanning, who brought it to Parmalee lead singer Matt Thomas. They played it for the rest of the band on their bus. Parmalee decided to tailor it to their style and worked on the song for much of May 2024. They changed a few lyrics, adjusted the melody and wrote a bridge to generate a change of pace. They balanced catchy, abstract expressions (such as "giddy hard" and "24-karat palomino") with traditional country imagery such as beer, jeans and trucks.

In early July 2024, Fanning produced the song at Sound Stage Studios in Nashville, Tennessee, building on top of the percussive loop from the original demo. He assembled a small studio band, allowing them to efficiently record all five of the songs they had planned for the day. Parmalee oversaw the session from the control room to guide the studio musicians, ensuring that the performance captured their unique style. The band later overdubbed instrumental parts, while Matt Thomas recorded his final vocal part, singing in the higher register. Barry Knox and Josh McSwain joined him to work on the harmonies, intending to enhance the light nature of the song. They recorded the harmonies from multiple parts of the studio, creating around 30 or more vocal layers to fashion a party atmosphere. An additional voice was subtly included on the final chorus.

Parmalee considered several songs for their next single and chose "Cowgirl", as Knox felt it was the most fitting choice. Stoney Creek Records released the song to country radio via PlayMPE on January 8, 2025. In the first week of release, the song was added to 93 stations, the most significant add date of their career.

Matt Thomas said of the song, "It's about falling in love with that cowgirl or just somebody different that has you going out and trying new things, and you're loving every bit of it."

== Content ==
In the song, a man becomes captivated by a woman because of her cowgirl qualities, which include two-stepping across the dance floor of a dive bar, sipping Bud Light, and listening to "Last Night" by Morgan Wallen.

== Live performances ==
Parmalee performed the song on Today on April 7, 2025.

== Charts ==
Chart performance for "Cowgirl"
Chart (2025–2026)	Peak position
Canada Hot 100 (Billboard)	76
Canada Country (Billboard)	2
US Billboard Hot 100	50
US Country Airplay (Billboard)	1
US Hot Country Songs (Billboard)	17
