= Just the Way =

Single by Parmalee and Blanco Brown

from the album For You
- Released: December 13, 2019
- Recorded: 2019
- Genre: Country
- Length: 3:13
- Label: Stoney Creek
- Songwriters: Matt Thomas; Kevin Bard; Nolan Sipe
- Producer: David Fanning

Parmalee singles chronology
| "Hotdamalama" (2018) | "Just the Way" (2019) | "Take My Name" (2021) |

Blanco Brown singles chronology
| "The Git Up" (2019) | "Just The Way" (2019) | "Do Si Do" (2020) |

Music video
- "Just The Way" on YouTube

"Just the Way" is a song recorded by American country music group Parmalee and American rapper Blanco Brown. It was released on December 13, 2019 as the first single from Parmalee's seventh studio album For You. The song was written by Parmalee's lead vocalist Matt Thomas, along with Kevin Bard and Nolan Sipe.

== Background ==
"Just the Way" is an upbeat song with a catchy melody that fits the content of the track, and praises folks for being true to themselves and encourages self-acceptance.

== Music video ==
The music video was uploaded on February 26, 2020. The video shines a spotlight on different types of women, from a young girl who's in a wheelchair to an older woman full of life. The scene is set against a colorful backdrop as the guys hand each woman red, pink, and yellow roses, the camera capturing their delighted reactions as the bubbly pop-country song plays.

== Live performance ==
On December 1, 2019, Parmalee and Brown debuted "Just the Way" during halftime of Sunday Night Football. On March 7, 2022, they performed the song with Brooke Eden on the 57th Academy of Country Music Awards. It was released a day later as an Amazon Music original.

== Charts ==
"Just the Way" debuted at number 59 on the Billboard Country Airplay chart dated May 30, 2020. In January 2021, it became Parmalee's first Top 10 country single since "Already Callin' You Mine" in 2015, and in March it became their second number one single, and their first since "Carolina" in December 2013. In addition, it was Brown's first number one single on the Country Airplay chart.

=== Weekly charts ===
| Chart (2019–2021) | Peak position |
|---|---|
| Australia Country Hot 50 (TMN) | 2 |
| Canada Hot 100 (Billboard) | 50 |
| Canada Country (Billboard) | 1 |
| US Billboard Hot 100 | 31 |
| US Adult Contemporary (Billboard) | 25 |
| US Adult Pop Airplay (Billboard) | 19 |
| US Country Airplay (Billboard) | 1 |
| US Hot Country Songs (Billboard) | 3 |

=== Year-end charts ===
| Chart (2020) | Position |
|---|---|
| US Hot Country Songs (Billboard) | 59 |

| Chart (2021) | Position |
|---|---|
| US Billboard Hot 100 | 88 |
| US Country Airplay (Billboard) | 8 |
| US Hot Country Songs (Billboard) | 40 |

== Certifications ==
| Region | Certification | Certified units/sales |
|---|---|---|
| Canada (Music Canada) | 3× Platinum | 240,000^{‡} |
| New Zealand (RMNZ) | Gold | 15,000^{‡} |
| United States (RIAA) | 2× Platinum | 2,000,000^{‡} |
^{‡} Sales+streaming figures based on certification alone.

== Release history ==
| Region | Date | Format | Label | Ref. |
|---|---|---|---|---|
| Various | December 13, 2019 | Digital download; streaming | Stoney Creek | |
| United States | April 12, 2021 | Adult contemporary radio | Warner Records; Stoney Creek | |
