= Gonna Love You =

Single by Parmalee

from the album For You 2
- Released: October 30, 2023
- Genre: Country
- Length: 2:58
- Label: Stoney Creek
- Songwriters: Matt Thomas; Abram Dean; Andy Sheridan; David Fanning
- Producer: David Fanning

Parmalee singles chronology
"Girl in Mine" (2022)	"Gonna Love You" (2023)	"Cowgirl" (2025)

"Gonna Love You" is a song by American country music band Parmalee. It was released on October 30, 2023, as the fourth single from their seventh studio album For You, and specifically a bonus track from the album's 2022 re-issue For You 2. Lead singer Matt Thomas wrote the song with Abram Dean, Andy Sheridan, and David Fanning, who also produced it.

== History ==
David Fanning, a songwriter and producer who works with Parmalee, noted that lead singer Matt Thomas did not have many songs which showed off the higher end of his vocal range. The two said they wanted to create a "grand" song similar in feel to Aerosmith's "I Don't Want to Miss a Thing". Lyrically, it is about promises made by the male narrator to his lover. Tom Roland of Billboard also cited influences of Chicago and 3 Doors Down in the arrangement.

== Charts ==
=== Weekly charts ===
Weekly chart performance for "Gonna Love You"
Chart (2023–2024)	Peak position
Canada Country (Billboard)	27
US Bubbling Under Hot 100 (Billboard)	2
US Country Airplay (Billboard)	1
US Hot Country Songs (Billboard)	20

=== Year-end charts ===
2024 year-end chart performance for "Gonna Love You"
Chart (2024)	Position
US Country Airplay (Billboard)	44
