= The Git Up =

Single by Blanco Brown

from the album Honeysuckle & Lightning Bugs
- Released: May 3, 2019
- Genre: Country rap; trap-country
- Length: 3:20
- Label: BBR; TrailerTrapMusic
- Songwriter: Blanco Brown
- Producer: Blanco Brown

Blanco Brown singles chronology
"The Git Up" (2019)	"Just the Way" (2019)

"The Git Up" is a song by American artist Blanco Brown, released as his debut single on May 3, 2019. It has been described as the "sequel" to Lil Nas X's "Old Town Road" and the "next viral country rap song". Brown filmed himself performing a line dance to the song, which became a meme and was later used in its music video. It debuted at number 66 on the US Billboard Hot 100 and peaked at number 14. "The Git Up" serves as the lead single from Brown's debut album Honeysuckle & Lightning Bugs. A remix featuring singer Ciara was released on December 23, 2019, containing an altered, "booming" beat.

== Background ==
Brown described the initial version of the track as similar to "Achy Breaky Heart" (which Billy Ray Cyrus featured in the remix of "Old Town Road"), influencing the dance element as he felt "You couldn't take the song serious, but then you can't make the song a joke either, because it was a smash." The release of the similar "Old Town Road" had a direct effect on the release of the song, as initially it "was supposed to be like a filler" from his EP. However, after learning of "Old Town Road", Brown called his label's vice president telling him they needed to release the song.

== Commercial performance ==
The song reached number one on the Hot Country Songs chart on its fifth week on the chart. The song was certified Gold on September 4, 2019, and Platinum on October 4, 2019. The song has sold 475,000 copies in the United States as of March 2020.

== Remix ==
An official remix was released on December 23, 2019, featuring R&B singer Ciara, a longtime friend of Brown's. The remix has a new beat, with "more booming, extra percussion and hand claps". Brown and Ciara perform the bridge together. Ciara references her previous song, "1, 2 Step", singing: "Let me see you two step, then one, two step".

== Charts ==
=== Weekly charts ===
Chart (2019–2020)	Peak position
Australia (ARIA)	5
Canada Hot 100 (Billboard)	6
Canada Country (Billboard)	37
Canada Hot AC (Billboard)	43
Germany (GfK)	42
Germany Airplay (BVMI)	59
Ireland (IRMA)	76
Lithuania (AGATA)	76
New Zealand (Recorded Music NZ)	8
Poland (Polish Airplay Top 100)	18
Scotland Singles (OCC)	34
Sweden Heatseeker (Sverigetopplistan)	8
Switzerland (Schweizer Hitparade)	78
UK Singles (OCC)	96
US Billboard Hot 100	14
US Adult Pop Airplay (Billboard)	40
US Hot Country Songs (Billboard)	1
US Country Airplay (Billboard)	44
US Pop Airplay (Billboard)	22
US Rhythmic Airplay (Billboard)	31
US Rolling Stone Top 100	11

=== Year-end charts ===
Chart (2019)	Position
Australia (ARIA)	24
Canada (Canadian Hot 100)	30
New Zealand (Recorded Music NZ)	47
US Billboard Hot 100	56
US Hot Country Songs (Billboard)	6
US Rolling Stone Top 100	83

== Certifications ==
Region	Certification	Certified units/sales
Australia (ARIA)	3× Platinum	210,000^{‡}
Brazil (Pro-Música Brasil)	Gold	20,000^{‡}
Canada (Music Canada)	5× Platinum	400,000^{‡}
New Zealand (RMNZ)	3× Platinum	90,000^{‡}
Norway (IFPI Norway)	Gold	30,000^{‡}
Poland (ZPAV)	Gold	25,000^{‡}
United Kingdom (BPI)	Silver	200,000^{‡}
United States (RIAA)	5× Platinum	5,000,000^{‡}
Streaming
Sweden (GLF)	Gold	4,000,000^{†}
^{‡} Sales+streaming figures based on certification alone.^{†} Streaming-only figures based on certification alone.
