= Take My Name =

2021 single by Parmalee

Single by Parmalee

from the album For You
- Released: October 4, 2021
- Genre: Country
- Length: 2:37
- Label: Stoney Creek
- Songwriters: Ashley Gorley; Ben Johnson; David Fanning; Matt Thomas
- Producer: David Fanning

Parmalee singles chronology
"Just the Way" (2019)	"Take My Name" (2021)	"Girl in Mine" (2022)

Visualizer video
- "Take My Name" on YouTube

"Take My Name" is a song by American country music band Parmalee. It was released on October 4, 2021, as the second single from the band's seventh studio album For You. The band's lead vocalist Matt Thomas co-wrote the song with Ashley Gorley, Ben Johnson and David Fanning, while it was produced by Fanning.

== Background ==
On July 9, 2021, the band posted a snippet on TikTok, and announced the song had been released early. Robyn Collins of Taste of Country described the song as "a musical marriage proposal". The band's lead vocalist Matt Thomas told Sounds Like Nashville: "'Take My Name' was inspired by my brother Scott getting married last year, It made me sit back and think about what I would want to say to my future wife".

== Content ==
Thomas told American Songwriter: "'Take My Name' is a song about finding the person you want to spend the rest of your life with. A feeling you haven't had before. You don't want to look anywhere else or waste anymore time, you are ready to make that person yours".

== Live performance ==
On October 18, 2021, the band performed the song on The Kelly Clarkson Show.

== Charts ==
=== Weekly charts ===
Weekly chart performance for "Take My Name"
Chart (2021–2023)	Peak position
Canada Hot 100 (Billboard)	62
Canada Country (Billboard)	4
US Billboard Hot 100	22
US Adult Contemporary (Billboard)	28
US Adult Pop Airplay (Billboard)	10
US Country Airplay (Billboard)	1
US Hot Country Songs (Billboard)	2

=== Year-end charts ===
Year-end chart performance for "Take My Name"
Chart (2022)	Position
US Billboard Hot 100	82
US Country Airplay (Billboard)	1
US Hot Country Songs (Billboard)	19

2023 year-end chart performance for "Take My Name"
Chart (2023)	Position
US Adult Top 40 (Billboard)	25

== Certifications ==
Certifications for "Take My Name"
Region	Certification	Certified units/sales
Canada (Music Canada)	Platinum	80,000^{‡}
United States (RIAA)	Platinum	1,000,000^{‡}
^{‡} Sales+streaming figures based on certification alone.

== Release history ==
Release history for "Take My Name"
Region	Date	Format	Label	Ref.
Various	July 30, 2021	Digital download; streaming	Stoney Creek	
United States	October 4, 2021	Country radio	Stoney Creek	
