= Waiting on You (Lindsay Ell song) =

Single by Lindsay Ell

from the album The Project
- Released: May 29, 2017
- Genre: Country blues
- Length: 3:55
- Label: Stoney Creek
- Songwriter(s): Lindsay Ell; Adam Hambrick; Andrew DeRoberts
- Producer(s): Kristian Bush

Lindsay Ell singles chronology
"All Alright" (2016)	"Waiting on You" (2017)	"Criminal" (2017)

"Waiting on You" is a song written and recorded by Canadian country music singer, songwriter, and guitarist Lindsay Ell. It was released May 29, 2017 as Ell's sixth single and serves as the lead single for her third studio album, The Project (2017). Ell co-wrote the song with Adam Hambrick and Andrew DeRoberts, while Kristian Bush of Sugarland produced the track. "Waiting on You" is also included on Ell's debut extended play, Worth the Wait (2017). The song became Ell's first top five single on the Canadian country chart.

== Release and promotion ==
Following a string of successful one-off singles between 2013 and 2016, Ell released her debut extended play, Worth the Wait, in March 2017. "Waiting on You" was selected as the record's lead single and was made available to country radio stations via the digital Play MPE service on May 8, 2017. It officially went for adds at the format in the United States on May 29, 2017. A radio edit of the song was released digitally on March 2, 2018 in promotion of the album's UK physical release.

Ell was scheduled to appear on the Sacramento, California country station KNCI on June 16, 2017 as part of a promotional radio tour for the single, but the appearance was cancelled the day before. Through her Twitter, Ell explained that she had been asked not to attend "bc of my personal life," referring to her relationship with Bobby Bones, a popular radio personality from a rival station. The controversial decision renewed discussions about the challenges faced by female artists and generated increased interest in the single. Ell appeared on Jimmy Kimmel Live four days later, on June 20, 2017, and performed the song to general acclaim.

== Critical reception ==
Billy Dukes of Taste of Country wrote that "everything about this song is looser, more honest and much more compelling than anything Ell had released previously."

== Chart performance ==
"Waiting on You" debuted at number 60 on the Billboard Country Airplay chart dated July 15, 2017. This earned Ell her fourth entry on the country charts in the United States. The song peaked at number 42 in November 2017, making it her highest-charting single on Country Airplay to date. Follow-up single, "Criminal", would surpass this peak the following month. In October 2017, "Waiting on You" reached number 4 on the Canada Country chart, becoming her highest-peaking single to date in her home country.

== Music video ==
A music video directed by Peter Zavadil premiered July 5, 2017 through CMT.

== Charts ==
Chart (2017)	Peak position
Canada Country (Billboard)	4
US Country Airplay (Billboard)	42
