= Adam Craig (singer) =

American singer-songwriter

- Born: Tenino, Washington
- Genre: Country
- Occupation: Singer-songwriter
- Instruments: Vocals, guitar
- Label: Stoney Creek
- Website: adamcraigofficial.com

Adam Craig is an American country music singer-songwriter from Tenino, Washington. In March 2011 he signed to Sony/ATV Music Publishing, and has co-penned songs including Parmalee's "Close Your Eyes", Jason Aldean's "Church Pew or Bar Stool", Dustin Lynch's "World to Me", and Love and Theft's "Whiskey on My Breath". Now signed to Stoney Creek Records, Craig has released his self-titled debut EP, and his debut single to country radio called "Reckon", written by Randy Montana, also off of his self titled EP was "Just a Phase" which climbed into the top 40. Following his self titled EP, Adam released a single called "Why Can't She". This song stayed on radio for just under a year when he finally released the "If You're Lucky" single track. This song was released as a single with "Whatever You're Drinking To" being a song on the record as well. Derek George and Jeremy Stover.

== Early life ==
Adam Craig grew up in Tenino, Washington, 75 miles south of Seattle. He played baseball throughout high school until learning guitar at the age of 18. After playing one year of college baseball, and touring in a three-piece country band, Adam decided to focus on music, performing with Sara Evans and meeting with a Nashville-based producer. In 2004 Adam moved to Nashville.

== Music career ==
Soon after his move to Nashville, Craig signed his first publishing deal. He performed at clubs on Broadway, and eventually formed a band under the name TelluRide and later, The Adam Craig Band. The band independently released three singles, charting on the Billboard Indicator Chart. In 2010 Adam had his first song recorded by a major label artist, with "Church Pew or Bar Stool" by Jason Aldean. It was that song and others that landed him signing with Sony/ATV in April 2011, and to the Broken Bow label group in 2014. Craig was credited as one of the country artists to watch in 2017 by Sounds Like Nashville. Craig parted way's with Stoney Creek in October 2019.

== Songwriting discography ==
Year	Artist	Album	Song	Co-Writers
2010	Jason Aldean	My Kinda Party	"Church Pew or Bar Stool"	Josh Thompson (singer), Michael Howard
2014	Parmalee	Feels Like Carolina	"Close Your Eyes"	Shane Minor, Trent Tomlinson
2014	Dustin Lynch	Where It's At	"World to Me"	Matt Rogers, Ash Bowers
2014	The Swon Brothers	The Swon Brothers	"Same Old Highway"	Josh Thompson, Jeff Middleton
2014	Dallas Smith	Lifted	"Wastin' Gas"	Jon Nite, Matt Dragstrem
2014	Jason Aldean	Old Boots, New Dirt	"Fast Lanes"	Josh Thompson, Michael Howard
2015	Love and Theft	Whiskey on My Breath	"Whiskey on My Breath"	Stephen Barker Liles, Tyler Reeve, Mark McGuinn, Trent Tomlinson, Russell Dickerson
2015	Love and Theft	Whiskey on My Breath	"Let's Get Drunk and Make Friends"	Stephen Barker Liles, Andy Gibson, Tyler Reeve, Mark McGuinn, Trent Tomlinson, Russell Dickerson
2015	Love and Theft	Whiskey on My Breath	"Tan Lines"	Stephen Barker Liles, Eric Gunderson, Trent Tomlinson
2015	Montgomery Gentry	Folks Like Us	"Folks Like Us"	Ash Bowers, Neal Coty
2016	Cole Taylor		"Take a Drink"	Lindsay Rimes, Shane Minor, Cole Taylor

== Discography ==
=== Extended plays ===
Title	Release date	Track	Writers
Adam Craig EP	May 20, 2016	1. "Reckon"	Randy Montana, Derek George, Jeremy Stover
Adam Craig EP	May 20, 2016	2. "Call It a Night"	Liz Rose, Busbee, Adam Craig
Adam Craig EP	May 20, 2016	3. "Just a Phase"	Jim Beavers, Lindsay Rimes, Adam Craig
Adam Craig EP	May 20, 2016	4. "Born Wild"	Jon Nite, Brad Warren, Brett Warren, Adam Craig
Adam Craig EP	May 20, 2016	5. "It's All Good"	Jamie Paulin, Lindsay Rimes, Adam Craig

=== Singles ===
Year	Single	Peak positions		Album
Year	Single	US Country Songs	US Country Airplay	Album
2016	"Reckon"	—	—	Adam Craig
2017	"Just a Phase"	38	35	Adam Craig
"—" denotes releases that did not chart

=== Music videos ===
Video	Year	Director
"Reckon"	2016	Chris Hicky
"Just a Phase"	2017	The Edde Brothers
