= Musta Had a Good Time =

Single by Parmalee

from the album Feels Like Carolina
- Released: July 9, 2012
- Recorded: 2012
- Genre: Country rock
- Length: 3:35
- Label: Stoney Creek
- Songwriters: Matt Thomas; Scott Thomas; Josh McSwain; Barry Knox; David Fanning
- Producer: New Voice Entertainment

Parmalee singles chronology
"Musta Had a Good Time" (2012)	"Carolina" (2013)

"Musta Had a Good Time" is a song recorded by American country music group Parmalee. It was released in July 2012 as their debut single and the first from their album Feels Like Carolina. The song was written by group members Matt Thomas, Scott Thomas, Josh McSwain, and Barry Knox, along with David Fanning.

== Critical reception ==
Billy Dukes of Taste of Country gave the song a two-star review, saying that "It’s not that country and rock haven’t been fused before — Jason Aldean has made a career of it. There’s an art to creating that mix, however. An inexperienced hand leaves the parts lying across the table, instead of blending seamlessly into a satisfying wall of sound."

== Music video ==
The music video was directed by Wes Edwards and premiered in August 2012.

== Chart performance ==
Chart (2012)	Peak position
US Country Airplay (Billboard)	38
US Hot Country Songs (Billboard)	42
