= Tennessee Orange =

Single by Megan Moroney

from the album Lucky
- Released: December 5, 2022
- Genre: Country
- Length: 3:45
- Label: Arista Nashville; Columbia Nashville
- Songwriters: Megan Moroney; Ben Williams; David Fanning; Paul Jenkins
- Producer: Kristian Bush

Megan Moroney singles chronology
"Tennessee Orange" (2022)	"I'm Not Pretty" (2023)

"Tennessee Orange" is a song by American country music singer Megan Moroney. The song was released in December 2022 as her debut single and the lead single from her debut studio album Lucky. Moroney wrote the song with Ben Williams, David Fanning, and Paul Jenkins.

It was nominated for the Country Music Association Award for Song of the Year at the 57th Annual CMA Awards.

== History ==
The song gained popularity while Moroney was still an unsigned artist, due to social media posts in which Moroney was wearing a Tennessee Volunteers T-shirt that fans speculated belonged to Morgan Wallen. At the time, she was recording music produced by Kristian Bush, one-half of the duo Sugarland, who serves as producer on the track. Due to the song's popularity online, it entered the Billboard Hot 100 in October 2022 based on downloads and streaming, and led to her signing with Arista Nashville by year's end. The label serviced the song to country radio until March 2023, when parent company Sony Music Nashville closed the Arista Nashville division and transferred Moroney to Columbia Records' Nashville division.

The song is a love story about college football, portraying a relationship between a narrator who is a fan of the Georgia Bulldogs and a man who is a fan of their rival, the Tennessee Volunteers. Moroney released a music video in January 2023 directed by Jason Lester which features Moroney wearing Tennessee Volunteers apparel.

== Charts ==
=== Weekly charts ===
Weekly chart performance for "Tennessee Orange"
Chart (2022–2023)	Peak position
Canada Hot 100 (Billboard)	57
Canada Country (Billboard)	3
US Billboard Hot 100	30
US Country Airplay (Billboard)	4
US Hot Country Songs (Billboard)	10

=== Year-end charts ===
2022 year-end chart performance for "Tennessee Orange"
Chart (2022)	Position
US Hot Country Songs (Billboard)	96

2023 year-end chart performance for "Tennessee Orange"
Chart (2023)	Position
US Billboard Hot 100	67
US Country Airplay (Billboard)	31
US Hot Country Songs (Billboard)	14

== Certifications ==
Certifications for "Tennessee Orange"
Region	Certification	Certified units/sales
Canada (Music Canada)	3× Platinum	240,000^{‡}
New Zealand (RMNZ)	Platinum	30,000^{‡}
United Kingdom (BPI)	Silver	200,000^{‡}
United States (RIAA)	5× Platinum	5,000,000^{‡}
^{‡} Sales+streaming figures based on certification alone.
