= I Don't Love You (Lindsay Ell song) =

Single by Lindsay Ell

from the album Heart Theory
- Released: December 9, 2019
- Genre: Country; country blues
- Length: 3:32
- Label: Stoney Creek
- Songwriters: Adam Hambrick; Melissa Fuller; Neil Medley
- Producer: Dann Huff

Lindsay Ell singles chronology
"What Happens in a Small Town" (2019)	"I Don't Love You" (2019)	"Want Me Back" (2020)

"I Don't Love You" (Note: Stylized as "i don't lovE you") is a song recorded by Canadian country music artist Lindsay Ell for her fifth studio album, Heart Theory (2020). The song was written by Adam Hambrick, Melissa Fuller, and Neil Medley. It was released by Stoney Creek Records on November 8, 2019 as the album's lead single and officially impacted American country radio on December 9, 2019.

== Content ==
"I Don't Love You" was written in June 2017, inspired by a hook contributed by co-writer Adam Hambrick. The song follows a compound metre melody in 6/8 time with a "rambling, free-flow" vocal delivery that producer Dann Huff likened to a hip hop rhythm. Lyrically, the song relies on references to restaurants and memories of an ex-lover to capture the back-and-forths in the aftermath of a relationship. When the song was selected for recording by Ell, she and Huff decided to adjust the song's musical foundation from piano to guitar to better suit her musical sensibilities; Ell recorded blues-inspired guitar fills to complement the studio musicians.

== Critical reception ==
Lauren Jo Black of Country Now wrote that the song is "painstakingly beautiful" and "quite possibly Ell’s best vocal work to date." Billy Dukes of Taste of Country praised Ell's delivery of the song, writing that her convincing emotion despite not writing the lyrics "speaks to her much-improved ability to tell a great, universal country story."

== Commercial performance ==
"I Don't Love You" was the most-added song at American country radio the week of its release. It has since peaked at number 48 on the Billboard Country Airplay chart. "I Don't Love You" has also peaked at number 6 on the Billboard Canada Country airplay chart and at number 99 on the Canadian Hot 100, her second career entry on the latter.

== Charts ==
Chart (2019–2020)	Peak position
Canada Hot 100 (Billboard)	99
Canada Country (Billboard)	6
US Country Airplay (Billboard)	48

== Release history ==
Country	Date	Format	Label	Ref.
Various	November 8, 2019	Digital download; streaming	Stoney Creek	
United States	December 9, 2019	Country radio	Stoney Creek	
