= Parmele, North Carolina =

- Town
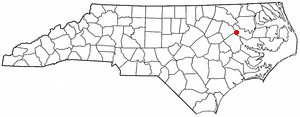
- Location in North Carolina
- Coordinates: 35°49′05″N 77°18′52″W
- Country: United States
- State: North Carolina
- County: Martin
- Settled: 1890
- Incorporated: February 14, 1893

Area
  - Total: 1.16 sq mi (3.00 km^{2})
  - Land: 1.16 sq mi (3.00 km^{2})
  - Water: 0 sq mi (0.00 km^{2})
- Elevation: 72 ft (22 m)

Population (2020)
  - Total: 243
  - Density: 209.8/sq mi (81.01/km^{2})
- Time zone: UTC-5 (Eastern (EST))
  - Summer (DST): UTC-4 (EDT)
- ZIP Code: 27861
- Area code: 252
- FIPS code: 37-50540
- GNIS feature ID: 2407075
- Website: www.parmelenc.com

Parmele is a town in Martin County, North Carolina, United States. The population was 243 at the 2020 census.

== History ==
The town was settled in 1890 when the Wilmington and Weldon Railroad was built through the area to provide transportation from nearby lumber mills. It was named for local lumber mill owner E. A. Parmele. Following the construction of the Albemarle and Raleigh Railroad the population rapidly grew, and the community was incorporated as a town in 1893 by the North Carolina General Assembly. A fire burned through much of the town on April 1, 1904, destroying many businesses and leading to the decline of nearby lumber mills. In 1909, William C. Chance founded the Higgs Industrial School for African Americans (also known as the Parmele Industrial Institute) which at its peak occupied a six-building campus and merged with the town's public school. The school was closed following a fire at its main building in 1954.

== Geography ==
Parmele is in western Martin County, 15 miles (24 km) west of Williamston, the county seat, and the same distance east of Tarboro. U.S. Route 64 Alt passes through the north side of the town, leading east 3.5 miles (5.6 km) to Robersonville and west 4 miles (6 km) to Bethel. The current U.S. Route 64 freeway (opened in 1996) passes to the north of Parmele, with the closest access from either Robersonville or Bethel.

According to the U.S. Census Bureau, the town of Parmele has a total area of 1.16 square miles (3.00 km^{2}), all land.

== Demographics ==
Historical population
Census	Pop.	Note	%±
1900	336		—
1910	272		−19.0%
1920	355		30.5%
1930	341		−3.9%
1940	417		22.3%
1950	406		−2.6%
1960	323		−20.4%
1970	373		15.5%
1980	484		29.8%
1990	321		−33.7%
2000	290		−9.7%
2010	278		−4.1%
2020	243		−12.6%
U.S. Decennial Census

=== 2020 census ===
Parmele town, North Carolina – Racial and ethnic composition Note: the US Census treats Hispanic/Latino as an ethnic category. This table excludes Latinos from the racial categories and assigns them to a separate category. Hispanics/Latinos may be of any race.
Race / Ethnicity (NH = Non-Hispanic)	Pop 2000	Pop 2010	Pop 2020	% 2000	% 2010	% 2020
White alone (NH)	31	24	31	10.69%	8.63%	12.76%
Black or African American alone (NH)	249	254	184	85.86%	91.37%	75.72%
Native American or Alaska Native alone (NH)	0	0	0	0.00%	0.00%	0.00%
Asian alone (NH)	1	0	0	0.34%	0.00%	0.00%
Native Hawaiian or Pacific Islander alone (NH)	0	0	0	0.00%	0.00%	0.00%
Other race alone (NH)	0	0	0	0.00%	0.00%	0.00%
Mixed race or Multiracial (NH)	7	0	8	2.41%	0.00%	3.29%
Hispanic or Latino (any race)	2	0	20	0.69%	0.00%	8.23%
Total	290	278	243	100.00%	100.00%	100.00%

=== 2000 census ===
As of the census of 2000, there were 290 people, 114 households, and 73 families residing. The population density was 244.7 people per square mile (94.5 people/km^{2}). There were 133 housing units at an average density of 112.2 per square mile (43.3/km^{2}). The racial makeup was 10.69% White, 85.86% African American, 0.34% Native American, 0.34% Asian, and 2.76% from two or more races. Hispanic or Latino of any race were 0.69% of the population.

There were 114 households, out of which 26.3% had children under the age of 18 living with them, 33.3% were married couples living together, 25.4% had a female householder with no husband present, and 35.1% were non-families. 34.2% of all households were made up of individuals, and 21.9% had someone living alone who was 65 years of age or older. The average household size was 2.54 and the average family size was 3.27.

The population was spread out, with 25.5% under the age of 18, 8.6% from 18 to 24, 20.3% from 25 to 44, 27.9% from 45 to 64, and 17.6% who were 65 years of age or older. The median age was 42 years. For every 100 females there were 77.9 males. For every 100 females age 18 and over, there were 78.5 males.

The median income for a household was $20,179, and the median income for a family was $21,528. Males had a median income of $22,344 versus $16,964 for females. The per capita income was $16,976. About 28.0% of families and 29.1% of the population were below the poverty line, including 32.0% of those under the age of eighteen and 28.0% of those 65 or over.

== Notable people ==
Country music group Parmalee, best known for their single "Carolina", is from Parmele.

Eloise Greenfield (1929–2021), born in Parmele, was an author of children's books, poetry, and a biography of her family.
