= Worth the Wait (EP) =

EP by Lindsay Ell
- Released: March 24, 2017
- Recorded: 2016–17
- Genre: Country
- Length: 21:41
- Label: Stoney Creek Records
- Producer: Kristian Bush

Lindsay Ell chronology
Alone (2009)	Worth the Wait (2017)	The Project (2017)

Singles from Worth the Wait
- 1. "Waiting on You" Released: May 29, 2017

Worth the Wait is the debut extended play by Canadian country artist Lindsay Ell. It was released on March 24, 2017 through Stoney Creek Records. The collection was recorded in eight months between 2016 and 2017 following a string of one-off singles. Kristian Bush of Sugarland produced the EP. Worth the Wait includes a cover of John Mayer's "Stop This Train".

== Background ==
Ell independently released an album titled Consider This through Maple Worldwide in December 2008. After moving to Nashville, Tennessee, she signed with record label Stoney Creek Records (a sister label to Broken Bow Records) in 2013. Five one-off singles were released between 2013 and 2016, with three charting on the American Country Airplay chart and the latest, "All Alright" (2016), reaching the top 10 on the Canada Country chart.

Ell met musician Kristian Bush in August 2016 and the two began recording the songs that would comprise Worth the Wait. The collection was inspired by John Mayer's 2006 album, Continuum, which Ell covered in full before working in earnest on her own EP. A cover of "Stop This Train" from that album was included on Worth the Wait.

== Singles ==
"Waiting on You" was released to American country radio on May 29, 2017 as the record's lead single.

== Critical reception ==
Laura Hostelley of Sounds Like Nashville wrote that the EP "shows off Ell's talent in all capacities, as a guitarist, vocalist and songwriter." Variety Beat commended the songs as being "deeply personal" and "relatable," and also wrote that the EP "is stacked with vulnerability and is deliberate in its sequence."

== Commercial performance ==
Worth the Wait debuted at number 8 on the Nielsen SoundScan Country Albums chart and at number 28 on the Billboard Country Albums chart, which combines sales and streaming. The EP reached as high as number seven on the all-genre iTunes sales chart in the United States. It debuted at number 139 on the Billboard 200 chart dated April 15, 2017 and at number 36 on the Top Album Sales component chart. The album has sold 6,300 copies in the US as of June 2017.

== Track listing ==
No.	Title	Writer(s)	Length
1.	"Waiting on You"	Lindsay Ell; Adam Hambrick; Andrew DeRoberts	3:55
2.	"Criminal"	Ell; Chris Stevens; Fred Wilhelm	3:23
3.	"Space"	Caitlyn Smith; Heather Morgan; Maggie Chapman	3:10
4.	"Standing Here"	Melissa Peirce; Ryan Hurd; Chase McGill	3:07
5.	"Worth the Wait"	Ell; Travis Meadows	3:30
6.	"Stop This Train"	John Mayer	4:36
Total length:			21:41

== Chart performance ==
Chart (2017)	Peak position
US Billboard 200	139
US Top Country Albums (Billboard)	28
US Independent Albums (Billboard)	7
