= Right on Time (Lindsay Ell song) =

2022 song by Lindsay Ell

Single by Lindsay Ell
- Released: April 27, 2022
- Genre: Country pop
- Length: 3:06
- Label: Stoney Creek; BMG
- Songwriter(s): Lindsay Ell; Jordan Schmidt; Geoff Warburton
- Producer(s): Jordan Schmidt

Lindsay Ell singles chronology
"Can't Do Without Me" (2021)	"Right on Time" (2022)	"Sweet Spot" (2023)

Music video
- "Right on Time" on YouTube

Alternate cover

"Right on Time" is a song co-written recorded by Canadian country pop artist Lindsay Ell. She wrote the song with Jordan Schmidt and Geoff Warburton, while Schmidt produced the track.

== Background ==
Ell cited "Right on Time" as her "own theme song", taking inspiration from the idea that "women spend a lot of time feeling like they might miss their ‘time’ in life –their time to be beautiful, to be a mother, to have their dream career, to work their ass off," adding there is "a constant fear that we might miss the very thing we want by focusing on something else" and that she was ”just done worrying about that". She said that the song is for "anyone who needs to hear and be inspired by the idea that you can’t be late to the party in your own life".

== Critical reception ==
Erica Zisman of Country Swag referred to the song as a "bonafide anthem for single people or people who thought they would be somewhere else by now". Music critic Eric Alper stated that the track "introduces a new, clearly confident side of Ell," framing it as "upbeat and incredibly catchy". Front Porch Music described "Right on Time" as "the perfect song to remind you to take a breath, slow down, and embrace the moment that you’re in," calling it an "anthem" for "anyone who felt pressured to follow societal norms". Off the Record UK said that the song is "joyfully fun," adding that "Ell puts a voice to the pressure she feels as a career-focused woman in her 30s". Top Country named the track their "Pick of the Week" for April 29, 2022, saying it "encompasses a strong message about accepting where you are at in life and truly celebrating it". To the Point Music called the track "a reminder that only we define what our lives will be".

== Accolades ==
Year	Association	Category	Result	Ref
2022	Canadian Country Music Association	Music Video of the Year	Nominated	
2023	Canadian Country Music Association	Single of the Year	Won	

== Commercial performance ==
"Right on Time" peaked at number 8 on the Billboard Canada Country chart for the week of September 17, 2022, marking Ell's seventh top ten radio hit in her country of birth. It spent 24 weeks in total on the chart. The song also peaked at number 98 on the all-genre Canadian Hot 100 for the same week, spending 2 weeks on the chart in total.

== Music video ==
The official music video for "Right on Time" premiered on April 27, 2022. It features Ell performing the song for a fictional "Right on Time Support Group" before the rest of the group joins in and celebrates being at the right place in their lives.

== Credits and personnel ==
Credits adapted from AllMusic.

- Sean R. Badum – engineering
- Drew Bollman – engineering
- Jeff Braun – engineering, programming
- Lindsay Ell – electric guitar, songwriting, primary vocals, background vocals
- Ted Jensen – engineer
- Alyson McAnally – assistant producer
- Jake Moss – digital editing
- Jerry Roe – drums, percussion
- Justin Schipper – steel guitar
- Jordan Schmidt – digital editing, production, programming, recording, songwriting
- Jimmy Lee Sloas – bass guitar
- Ilya Toshinskiy – guitar, acoustic guitar, mandolin
- Geoff Warburton – songwriting
- Derek Wells – electric guitar
- Alex Wright – Hammond B-3 organ, piano, synthesizer

== Charts ==
Chart performance for "Right on Time"
Chart (2022)	Peak position
Canada (Canadian Hot 100)	98
Canada Country (Billboard)	8
