= Want Me Back =

2020 Song by Lindsay Ell

Single by Lindsay Ell

from the album Heart Theory
- Released: July 13, 2020
- Genre: Country pop; pop rock
- Length: 3:13
- Label: Stoney Creek
- Songwriter(s): Lindsay Ell; Kane Brown; Matt McGinn; Lindsay Rimes
- Producer(s): Dann Huff

Lindsay Ell singles chronology
"I Don't Love You" (2019)	"Want Me Back" (2020)	"Good on You" (2021)

Music video
- "Want Me Back" on YouTube

"Want Me Back" (stylized as "wAnt me back") is a song co-written and recorded by Canadian country music artist Lindsay Ell. She co-wrote the track with Kane Brown, Matt McGinn, and Lindsay Rimes. The song was the second single off Ell's fifth studio album Heart Theory.

== Background ==
Ell said of "Want Me Back", "It’s all about stepping into your own power". Co-writer Kane Brown stated: "I think Lindsay is an awesome artist. I was excited and grateful to be part of the song".

== Critical reception ==
Billy Dukes of Taste of Country called the track Ell's "most commercially friendly radio release to date," adding "the clean structure, guitar lines and verses recall and build off of the Brantley Gilbert collaboration 'What Happens in a Small Town'". Soundigest called the song "upbeat" and an "empowerment anthem".

== Commercial performance ==
"Want Me Back" reached a peak of #1 on the Billboard Canada Country chart dated December 12, 2020, becoming Ell's second number one. The song also reached a peak of #89 on the Canadian Hot 100, as well as #35 on Hot Country Songs and #52 on Country Airplay in the United States, while it peaked at number 44 on The Music Network's Country Hot 50 in Australia. In March 2021, the song was certified Gold by Music Canada, becoming the first single of Ell's career to achieve this status.

== Music video ==
The official music video for "Want Me Back" premiered on October 8, 2020. The video finds Ell in a fictional duo named "Eddie and Ell" before breaking out as a solo artist herself. Chris Parton of Sounds Like Nashville said "the glamorous clip sends a powerful message … especially to young girls". Ell told CMT: "The video captures the whole story line in which my whole persona changes from an unconfident, held-back woman, to then realizing my own self-power and stepping into it".

== Charts ==
Chart (2020)	Peak position
Australia Country Hot 50 (TMN)	44
Canada (Canadian Hot 100)	89
Canada Country (Billboard)	1
US Hot Country Songs (Billboard)	35
US Country Airplay (Billboard)	52

== Certifications ==
Region	Certification	Certified units/sales
Canada (Music Canada)	Gold	40,000^{‡}
^{‡} Sales+streaming figures based on certification alone.
