= The Continuum Project =

Studio album by Lindsay Ell
- Released: May 25, 2018
- Recorded: Fall 2016
- Genre: Country; rock
- Length: 49:10
- Label: Stoney Creek Records
- Producer: Kristian Bush; Lindsay Ell

Lindsay Ell chronology
The Project (2017)	The Continuum Project (2018)	Heart Theory (2020)

The Continuum Project is the fourth studio album by Canadian country music artist Lindsay Ell. Released on May 25, 2018, by Stoney Creek Records, the album was co-produced by Ell and Kristian Bush. The album is a track-by-track cover of John Mayer's 2006 album, Continuum. Recorded as a "homework" assignment before working on her debut label-supported album, The Project (2017), the record was released due to fan demand.

== Critical reception ==
Writing for Forbes, Brittany Hodak wrote that The Continuum Project is a "creative, nuanced and refreshing take on [Continuum], with several standout performances both musically and vocally." Matt Bjorke of Roughstock called the album a "wonderful tribute to one of [Ell's] musical heroes," and praised both Ell's guitar-playing skills and artistic expression.

== Commercial performance ==
The Continuum Project sold 1,100 copies in the United States in its first week. The album debuted and peaked at number 28 on the Billboard Top Independent Albums chart.

== Promotion ==
Ell filmed music videos for two of the album's tracks – "I Don't Trust Myself (With Loving You)" and "Dreaming with a Broken Heart" – both of which were directed by Brian Vaughan.

== Track listing ==
No.	Title	Writer(s)	Length
1.	"Waiting on the World to Change"	John Mayer	3:28
2.	"I Don't Trust Myself (With Loving You)"	Mayer	4:38
3.	"Belief"	Mayer	3:49
4.	"Gravity"	Mayer	4:24
5.	"The Heart of Life"	Mayer	3:11
6.	"Vultures"	Mayer; Steve Jordan; Pino Palladino	3:52
7.	"Stop This Train"	Mayer	4:36
8.	"Slow Dancing in a Burning Room"	Mayer	4:06
9.	"Bold as Love"	Jimi Hendrix	4:18
10.	"Dreaming with a Broken Heart"	Mayer	4:02
11.	"In Repair"	Mayer; Charlie Hunter	6:03
12.	"I'm Gonna Find Another You"	Mayer	2:43
Total length:			49:10

== Charts ==
Chart (2018)	Peak position
US Independent Albums (Billboard)	28
