= Already Callin' You Mine =

Single by Parmalee

from the album Feels Like Carolina
- Released: February 2, 2015
- Recorded: 2013
- Genre: Country, country rock
- Length: 3:04
- Label: Stoney Creek
- Songwriter(s): Matt Thomas; Scott Thomas; Barry Knox; Phil O'Donnell; Wade Kirby
- Producer(s): New Voice Entertainment

Parmalee singles chronology
"Close Your Eyes" (2014)	"Already Callin' You Mine" (2015)	"Roots" (2016)

Alternative cover

"Already Callin' You Mine" is a song recorded by American country music group Parmalee. It was released in February 2015 as the fourth single from their album Feels Like Carolina. The song was written by group members Matt Thomas, Scott Thomas, and Barry Knox, along with Phil O'Donnell and Wade Kirby.

== Critical reception ==
Website Taste of Country reviewed the song favorably, saying that "After back-to-back mid-tempo hits, this song gets back to the band’s rock roots without pouring it on too heavily for radio success, like maybe they did with their debut, the Top 40 hit “Musta Had a Good Time.” The song should find few obstacles on its way as it climbs the charts in 2015."

== Commercial performance ==
The song debuted the Country Airplay chart for the chart of February 21, 2015 at No. 55, and entered the Hot Country Songs chart of April 25, 2015 at No. 49. The song climbed slowly up the chart. It also debuted at number 25 on the US Billboard Bubbling Under Hot 100 Singles chart for the week of September 26, 2015. The song has sold 174,000 copies in the US as of January 2016.

== Charts ==
Chart (2015)	Peak position
Canada Country (Billboard)	33
US Billboard Hot 100	91
US Country Airplay (Billboard)	10
US Hot Country Songs (Billboard)	16

=== Year-end charts ===
Chart (2015)	Position
US Country Airplay (Billboard)	56
US Hot Country Songs (Billboard)	67
