= The Project (Lindsay Ell album) =

Studio album by Lindsay Ell
- Released: August 11, 2017
- Recorded: 2016–17
- Genre: Country pop; pop rock
- Length: 40:44
- Label: Stoney Creek
- Producer: Kristian Bush

Lindsay Ell chronology
Worth the Wait (2017)	The Project (2017)	The Continuum Project (2018)

Singles from The Project
- 1. "Waiting on You" Released: May 29, 2017; 2. "Criminal" Released: December 11, 2017; 3. "Champagne" Released: September 17, 2018

The Project is the third studio album and major label debut by Canadian country music artist Lindsay Ell. It was released by Stoney Creek Records on August 11, 2017. The Project was the number-one selling country album the week of its release. The album was released in physical format in the United Kingdom on March 9, 2018.

== Singles ==
"Waiting on You", the album's lead single, was released on March 24, 2017 as part of Ell's EP, Worth the Wait. The song was released to American country radio on May 29, 2017.

The second single, "Criminal", was released to American country radio on December 11, 2017.

=== Promotional singles ===
"Champagne" was released as the album's first promotional single on July 21, 2017. "Good" was released as the second promotional single on July 28, 2017.

== Production ==
Before recording the album, Ell was worried about what sort of music she wanted to make and brought her concerns to producer Bush. Upon being asked what her favourite album was, she replied with Continuum by John Mayer. Bush then tasked her with recording the entire album by herself in under three weeks so that she could determine what sounds and production elements she liked, resulting in The Continuum Project which was released separately in 2018.

== Critical reception ==
Matt Bjorke of Roughstock wrote that Kristian Bush's production "allowed Lindsay to shine in a way that accentuates every nuanced talent she has as a singer, songwriter and guitarist," and called The Project "a beautiful collection worthy of revisiting time and time again." Cillea Houghton of Sounds Like Nashville praised Ell's artistry, writing that "what makes The Project so compelling is not just the songs themselves, but the fact that they are so unique from one another but still work cohesively."

== Commercial performance ==
The Project debuted at number 40 on the Billboard 200 chart dated September 2, 2017. On the Top Album Sales component chart, the album debuted at number seven. It also debuted at number four on the Top Country Albums chart, and at number one on the Country Album Sales component chart. The album sold 10,000 copies and 1,000 album-equivalent units in its first week. As of September 2017, the album has sold 14,600 copies in the US.

== Track listing ==
No.	Title	Writer(s)	Length
1.	"Waiting on You"	Lindsay Ell; Andrew DeRoberts; Adam Hambrick	3:53
2.	"Champagne"	Ell; Walker Hayes; Fred Wilhelm	3:04
3.	"Castle"	Ell; Abbey Cone; Josh Kerr	3:21
4.	"Good"	Ell; DeRoberts; Hambrick	2:48
5.	"Wildfire"	Ell; Kristian Bush	4:30
6.	"Mint"	Ell; Justin Ebach	2:56
7.	"White Noise"	Kelsea Ballerini; Ross Copperman; Josh Kear	3:35
8.	"Criminal"	Ell; Wilhelm; Chris Stevens	3:22
9.	"Just Another Girl"	Ell; Shane McAnally; Josh Osborne	3:04
10.	"Space"	Maggie Chapman; Heather Morgan; Caitlyn Smith	3:10
11.	"Always Kiss the Girl"	Bobby Hamrick; Jarrad Kritzstein; Carly Pearce	3:34
12.	"Worth the Wait"	Ell; Travis Meadows	3:27

== Charts ==
Chart (2017)	Peak position
US Billboard 200	40
US Top Country Albums (Billboard)	4
US Independent Albums (Billboard)	1

== Release history ==
Country	Date	Format	Label	Ref.
North America	August 11, 2017	Compact disc	Stoney Creek	
Worldwide	August 11, 2017	Digital download	BMG; Stoney Creek	
United Kingdom	March 9, 2018	Compact disc	BMG; Stoney Creek	
