= Adam Hambrick =

American country singer-songwriter (born 1985)

- Born: April 17, 1985 (age 41)
- Occupations: Singer; songwriter
- Years active: 2008–present
- Musical career
- Origin: Conway, Arkansas; Nashville, Tennessee
- Genres: Country; southern rock; Southern soul; country rock
- Labels: Mercury Nashville; Capitol Records Nashville/Buena Vista
- Website: www.adamhambrick.com

Adam Hambrick (born April 17, 1985) is an American country music singer and songwriter who has also written for Dan + Shay ("How Not To"), Justin Moore ("Somebody Else Will"), Eli Young Band, Lindsay Ell ("Waiting on You"), and several other musicians. He is signed to Capitol Records Nashville/Buena Vista.

== Life and career ==
Hambrick grew up in Mississippi and Arkansas, and graduated from the University of Central Arkansas. He moved to Nashville in 2013 and initially worked strictly as a songwriter; starting in 2017, he began performing as well.

Hambrick's 2018 single "Rockin' All Night Long" peaked at number 45 on the Billboard Hot Country Songs chart. In 2020, he launched a series of two-song EPs called Flipside, releasing the first, Top Down, Southbound, on September 4, 2020. The second Flipside EP, Love Is Quicksand, was released on October 23, 2020, and the third and final one will be released in early 2021. His EP Give Her a Rose was released on UMG on December 2, 2020. He performed his single "Between Me and the End of the World" on The Bachelorette on December 8, 2020.

== Discography ==
=== Extended plays ===
- Flipside: Top Down, Southbound (2020)
- Flipside: Love Is Quicksand (2020)
- Give Her A Rose (2020)

=== Singles ===
- "Rockin' All Night Long" (2018)
- "All You, All Night, All Summer" (2019)
- "Forever Ain't Long Enough" (2019)
- "What Christmas Means to Me" (2019)
- "Midnight in Montgomery" (2020)
- "Between Me and the End of the World" (2020)
