= Blanco Brown =

American country rapper

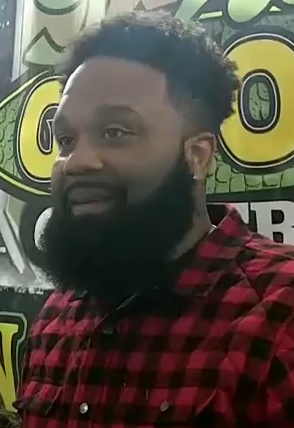
- Brown in 2019

Background information
- Also known as: Blanco
- Born: Bennie Julius Amey III; March 24, 1985 (age 40)
- Origin: Atlanta, Georgia, U.S.
- Genres: Hip hop; country rap; trap
- Occupations: Rapper; singer; songwriter; record producer
- Years active: 2015–present
- Labels: BBR; BMG; NuStarr; • Trailer Trap
- Website: www.blancobrown.com

Bennie Julius Amey III (born March 24, 1985), known professionally as Blanco Brown, is an American country rapper, singer, songwriter, and record producer who has produced for Fergie and Pitbull. Brown's debut single "The Git Up" was released in April 2019 and as of October 2022 has over 300 million streams on Spotify. In June 2019, Brown debuted on the Billboard charts, appearing at No. 41 on the Emerging Artists. "The Git Up" later topped the Hot Country Songs chart and reached the top 20 of the Billboard Hot 100.

== Early life ==
Amey was raised in Atlanta, Georgia, listening to hip hop artists, such as Outkast. In his younger days, Amey would listen to country music, such as Johnny Cash. Amey would go on to appreciate both forms of music.

== Career ==
=== "The Git Up" challenge ===
Brown posted a YouTube video with country music artist Lainey Wilson to teach people how to do the dance. "The Git Up" Challenge increased in popularity after the video was released and was featured in over 130,000 videos on TikTok. The song reached number 1 on Billboard's Hot Country Songs chart.

In 2021, Brown achieved a second number-one single on the country music charts as a featured vocalist on the band Parmalee's single "Just the Way". In 2024, he appeared in the country music documentary, Rebel Country.

== Personal life ==
On August 31, 2020, Brown was in a motorcycle accident that broke his wrists, arms, legs, and pelvis. He underwent a 12-hour surgery and successfully recovered one month later.

== Discography ==
=== Studio albums ===
Title	Album details	Peak chart positions				Sales	Certifications
Title	Album details	US	US Country	AUS Dig.	CAN	Sales	Certifications
Honeysuckle & Lightning Bugs	Released: October 11, 2019; Label: BBR; Formats: CD, digital download	130	16	10	58	US: 5,000	RIAA: Gold

=== Extended plays ===
Title	EP details	Sales
Blanco Brown	Released: May 31, 2019; Label: Broken Bow; Formats: Digital download	US: 1,200

=== Singles ===
Title	Year	Peak chart positions									Sales	Certifications	Album
Title	Year	US	US Country Songs	US Country Airplay	AUS	CAN	GER	IRE	NZ	UK	Sales	Certifications	Album
"The Git Up"	2019	14	1	44	5	6	42	76	8	96	US: 475,000	RIAA: 5× Platinum; ARIA: 3× Platinum; BPI: Silver; MC: 5× Platinum; RMNZ: 3× Platinum	Honeysuckle & Lightning Bugs
"Just the Way" (with Parmalee)	2019	31	3	1	—	50	—	—	—	—	US: 6,000	RIAA: 2× Platinum; MC: 3× Platinum	For You
"Do Si Do" (with Diplo)	2020	—	—	—	—	—	—	—	—	—			Diplo Presents Thomas Wesley, Chapter 1: Snake Oil
"Nobody's More Country"	2021	—	—	—	—	—	—	—	—	—			TBA
"High Horse" (with Nelly and Breland)	2021	—	—	—	—	—	—	—	—	—			Heartland

=== Written and co-written songs ===
Year	Artist	Album	Song	Co-written with
2015	Monica	Code Red	"Suga"	Atia Boggs, Monica Brown, Jocelyn A. Donald, Jamal Jones, Teena Marie, Richard J. Rudolph
2016	Malachiae Warren	Hear U Was in My City	"Do 2 U"	Jasper Cameron, Malachiae Warren
2017	2 Chainz	Pretty Girls Like Trap Music	"Burglar Bars"	Gabriel Arillo, Joshua Banks, Monica Brown, Mike Dean, Barbara Jean English, Tauheed Epps, Salomes Jackson, George Kerr
2017	Demetria McKinney	Officially Yours	"Sextraordinary (Interlude)"	Quintin Amey, Travis Cherry, Demetria McKinney, Donald Woolfolk
2017	Demetria McKinney	Officially Yours	"No, No, No"	Travis Cherry, Kid Class, Demetria McKinney, Anthony Wyley
2017	Demetria McKinney	Officially Yours	"Sextraordinary"	Quintin Amey, Travis Cherry, Demetria McKinney, Donald Woolfolk
2018	Pitbull	Goalie Goalie	"Goalie Goalie"	Mohombi, Cederic Lorrain, Christian Pérez, Alexandru Cotoi, Andrei Ropcea, Cezar Cazano
2018	Case	Therapy	"Heaven"	Case Woodward
2019	Raheem DeVaughn	The Love Reunion	"K.I.N.G."	Quintin Amey, Ahmad Rashad Brown, Rodreges Jabar Copeland, Lil King Tutt, Ursula Yancy
2019	Raheem DeVaughn	The Love Reunion	"Black Girl Magic"	
2019	Raheem DeVaughn	The Love Reunion	"Metronome"	Raheem DeVaughn

=== Produced and co-produced songs ===
Year	Artist	Album	Song	Produced with
2015	Monica	Code Red	"Suga"	Polow da Don
2018	Fergie	Double Dutchess	"M.I.L.F. $"	Polow da Don, Fergie Duhamel, Steve Macke
2018	Pitbull	Goalie Goalie	"Goalie Goalie"	Alexandru Cotoi, Andrei Ropcea
