= Parmalee =

American country music band

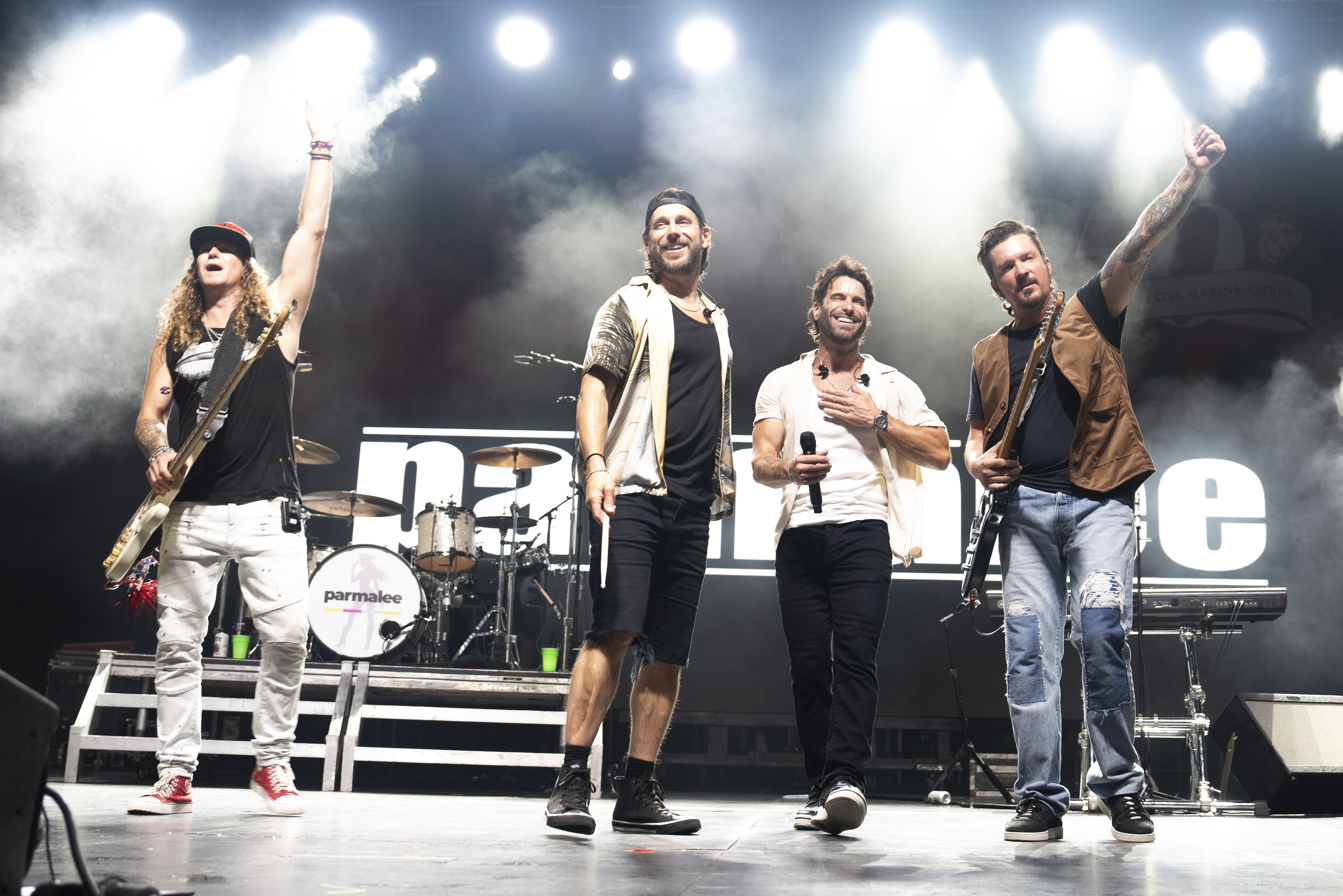
- Parmalee in 2025

Background information
- Origin: Parmele, North Carolina, U.S.
- Genres: Country; rock
- Years active: 2001–present
- Labels: Deep South, Stoney Creek
- Members: Barry Knox; Josh McSwain; Matt Thomas; Scott Thomas

Parmalee is an American country music band from Parmele, North Carolina. The band consists of brothers Matt Thomas (lead vocals, guitar) and Scott Thomas (drums), along with their cousin Barry Knox (bass) and Josh McSwain (guitar). They are signed to the Stoney Creek division of BBR Music Group and have released three studio albums: Feels Like Carolina, 27861, and For You. Parmalee has also had five number-one singles on the Billboard Country Airplay charts: "Carolina", "Just the Way" (featuring Blanco Brown), "Take My Name", "Gonna Love You", and "Cowgirl".

== Career ==
=== Early years ===
Prior to the formation of Parmalee, brothers Matt and Scott Thomas performed with their father in a group entitled Jerry Thomas and the Thomas Brothers Band. When their father retired, they wanted to continue playing music so they started Parmalee, consisting of Matt and Scott Thomas, Josh McSwain, and Barry Knox. Their first EP was titled Daylight. The band drew attention from producer David Bendeth of RCA. Bendeth invited them to record three songs at Water Music Studios in Hoboken, New Jersey, which led to a publishing deal with Los Angeles-based Windswept Publishing. Then came an invitation from Bendeth to record the remainder of the 12 songs that comprise the band's full-length debut album, Inside. Following the release, Parmalee spent nearly 2 years touring and promoting their album.

Parmalee also released a live acoustic album entitled Unplugged and a documentary-style DVD, Inside Live. In 2006, they went to Los Angeles to begin recording with producer Stevo Bruno. They split their time between touring the East Coast and recording in California. They recorded the majority of the tracks in Los Angeles (Nikki Sixx, bassist of Mötley Crüe, collaborated with Parmalee on several tracks, both writing and producing), then travelled to Nashville to write, produce, and mix the remainder of the record with producer Kevin Beamish. Parmalee released the EP Complicated in 2008.

=== Shooting ===
In 2010, the band were victims of an attempted robbery. They had just finished playing at The Money, a bar in Rock Hill, South Carolina, on September 21, and were in their RV when Dytavis Hinton and Demorrio Burris entered the vehicle with a handgun demanding money. Drummer Scott Thomas came out from the back of the bus with his own gun and told them to leave. According to the band, Burris opened fire and a gunfight erupted. Thomas was shot in the leg, stomach, and chest. Burris was killed and Hinton wounded in the lower half of his body. Both wounded men were transported to the Carolinas Medical Center. Thomas remained in critical condition after the gunshot wound and was hospitalized in Charlotte, North Carolina, for 35 days, ten of which he spent in a coma. Hinton pleaded guilty to attempted murder, burglary, attempted armed robbery, and criminal conspiracy; he was sentenced to 20 years in prison with no chance of parole. By May 2011, Thomas was well enough to get behind a drum kit for the first time and the band finally performed their promised label showcase.

=== Stoney Creek Records ===
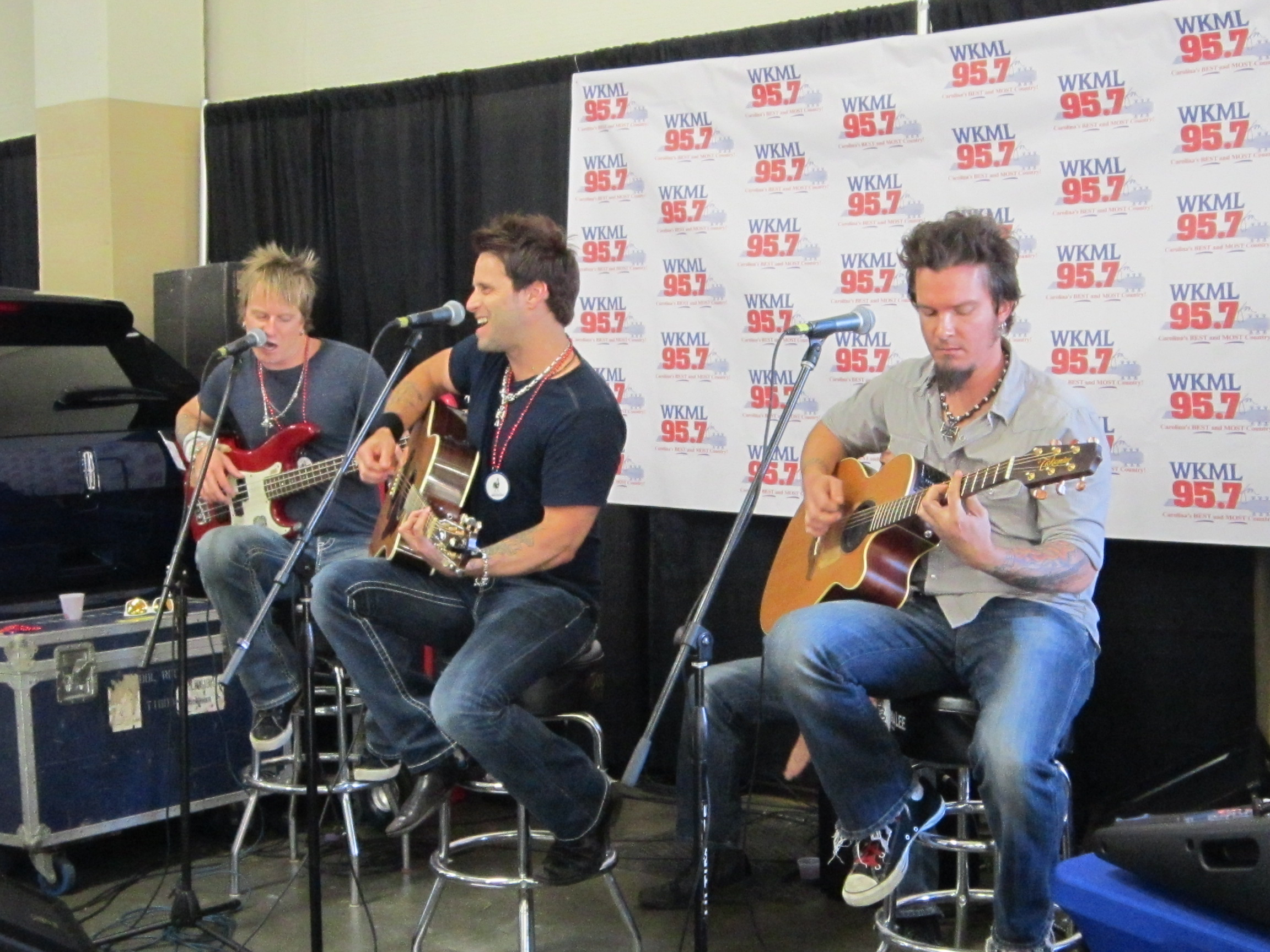
Parmalee performing at WKML in 2012

While in Nashville, Parmalee met David Fanning from New Voice Entertainment at Sound Stage Studios. Alongside him the band recorded their hit "Musta Had a Good Time" in the back of their RV. The song led to both their production and record deals.

The inspiration for "Musta Had a Good Time" came right from their own lives. When the band formed, they all moved into the same house and parties happened almost every night. Scott clarifies: "I can say the car wasn't in the pool. My friend drove his truck into a small creek. That actually happened. We had to get a tractor to pull it out." And when they shot the video, another party broke out until the owner of the house where the video was being shot asked them to leave. The band got kicked out of their own video shoot. "'Musta Had a Good Time' describes that one epic party that all of us have either been to -- or hope to go to -- at some point in our lives," says Matt. "It's that one party that becomes a legend in a small town. The response that we get from fans when we play this song live is crazy -- the fans know all the words and everyone's dancing, and it becomes a party on stage and in the crowd. We're finding out that there's a lot of people out there who really like to have a good time."

In June 2012, the band was featured as a Billboard "Bubbling Under" artist. A live performance video for the song debuted on AOL's TheBoot.com in July 2012 and the music video debuted in August 2012.

They were featured as Clear Channel's NEW! Artist to Watch (Country) and the song was picked as one of CountryMusicIsLove.com's Top 15 Songs of Summer. "Taste of Country" gave the single two stars out of five.

Their second Stoney Creek single, "Carolina", was released to country radio on February 4, 2013. It reached number 1 on the Country Airplay chart in December 2013. The band's first album on the label, Feels Like Carolina, was released on December 10, 2013. "Close Your Eyes" and "Already Callin' You Mine" were issued as the album's third and fourth singles, and both were top 10 hits on Country Airplay. "Roots" was released in late 2016 and served as the lead-off single to their second studio album on Stoney Creek, 27861, which was released July 21, 2017. It and "Sunday Morning" were minor top 40 hits for the band.

The band's next BBR single was 2020's "Just the Way", a collaboration with trap artist Blanco Brown. In March 2021, this became both the band's and Brown's second number-one single. The song was included on the band's third BBR album, For You. This album also charted the single "Take My Name". In 2023, the band re-issued For You as For You 2, with bonus tracks included. Among these were two new singles, "Girl in Mine" and "Gonna Love You".

On January 10, 2025, the band released the single "Cowgirl" and announced their fourth major label album (eighth overall) Fell in Love with a Cowgirl. The album was released on April 4, 2025.

== Discography ==
Studio albums

- Daylight (2002)
- Inside (2004)
- Mildew or Barbecue? (2006)
- Complicated (2008)
- Feels Like Carolina (2013)
- 27861 (2017)
- For You (2021)
- Fell in Love with a Cowgirl (2025)
