= Carolina (Parmalee song) =

Single by Parmalee

from the album Feels Like Carolina
- Released: February 4, 2013
- Recorded: 2008–13
- Genre: Country
- Length: 3:21
- Label: Stoney Creek
- Songwriters: Matt Thomas; Josh McSwain; Scott Thomas; Rick Beato; Barry Knox
- Producer: New Voice Entertainment

Parmalee singles chronology
"Musta Had a Good Time" (2012)	"Carolina" (2013)	"Close Your Eyes" (2014)

"Carolina" is a song recorded by American country music group Parmalee. It was first released on their 2008 EP titled Complicated before being remixed and re-released on February 4, 2013, as their second single for Stoney Creek Records. It is included on their album Feels Like Carolina, which was released on December 10, 2013. The song was written by group members Matt Thomas, Josh McSwain, Scott Thomas and Barry Knox with future YouTube personality Rick Beato.

== Writing ==
Carolina was originally written in 2007 when Parmalee flew down to Georgia to write with producer Rick Beato. Beato was recommended to them by a mutual friend in the music industry, so singer Matt Thomas found his phone number and called him up. The band arrived at the studio and showed him a few of their older songs before Beato asked to see something new. Thomas then picked up an acoustic guitar and showed him the beginning of a chorus that was part of a song idea they had come up with recently. Beato liked the song and told the band that they should continue to work on it.

A few weeks later the band came back to Beato's studio and finished the song in a very short time. They then tracked the original demo, which was a half step up from the 2013 version. The band also tracked 3 other songs with Beato. The band flew back up to Carolina while Beato mixed the song. He then sent the final mix to Matt Thomas and after that, heard nothing from the band until 2013.

== Content ==
The song is a mid-tempo song about the narrator's lover who "feels like Carolina" and reminds him of his home even when he is away from her. The song is in the key of B-flat major with a vocal range of F^{3}-G^{4} and a main chord pattern of E♭-B♭-F/A.

== Critical reception ==
Billy Dukes of Taste of Country gave the song three out of five, stating that "they sound as if they’re holding back, which holds the song back." Dukes wrote that "the chorus is as good as anything you’ll hear in 2013," but added that "the production feels too soft for a group of former rockers." Chuck Dauphin of Roughstock gave the song a favorable review, writing that "the harmonies are nothing short of incredible."

== Music videos ==
A live music video, directed by Reid Long, premiered in April 2013. The song's official music video, directed by Rhetorik, premiered in July 2013.

== Chart and sales performance ==
"Carolina" debuted at number 58 on the U.S. Billboard Country Airplay chart for the week of February 16, 2013. It also debuted at number 50 on the U.S. Billboard Hot Country Songs chart for the week of April 6, 2013. It also debuted at number 93 on the U.S. Billboard Hot 100 chart for the week of October 5, 2013. On the Country Airplay chart dated December 21, 2013, "Carolina" became Parmalee's first number one country hit. It would remain their only number one single until over seven years later, when they topped the chart a second time with "Just the Way" in March 2021. It sold 685,000 copies in the US by January 2014.

The song also debuted at number 100 on the Canadian Hot 100 chart for the week of December 7, 2013.

== Charts and certifications ==
=== Weekly charts ===
Chart (2013–2014)	Peak position
Canada Hot 100 (Billboard)	53
Canada Country (Billboard)	12
US Billboard Hot 100	36
US Country Airplay (Billboard)	1
US Hot Country Songs (Billboard)	2

=== Year-end charts ===
Chart (2013)	Position
US Country Airplay (Billboard)	47
US Hot Country Songs (Billboard)	54

Chart (2014)	Position
US Country Airplay (Billboard)	68
US Hot Country Songs (Billboard)	70

=== Certifications ===
Region	Certification	Certified units/sales
United States (RIAA)	Platinum	685,000
