= New Voice Entertainment =

- Origin: Nashville, Tennessee, U.S.
- Genres: Country
- Years active: 2010-2015
- Spinoff of: Rushlow
- Past members: Kurt Allison; David Fanning; Tully Kennedy; Rich Redmond

New Voice Entertainment was an American music production team composed of Rich Redmond, Kurt Allison, Tully Kennedy, and David Fanning. Redmond, Allison, and Kennedy are also in Jason Aldean's touring band, and were previously in the band Rushlow in 2003–2004. New Voice Entertainment has produced for Katie Armiger, Thompson Square, and Parmalee. The Thompson Square song "Are You Gonna Kiss Me or Not", which New Voice produced, reached number 1 on the country charts in 2011. New Voice also produced the number 1 singles "If I Didn't Have You" by Thompson Square and "Carolina" by Parmalee. They also produced solo singles for Fanning, including "Drink You Away".
