= David Fanning (singer) =

American singer-songwriter

- Born: June 12, 1986 (age 39); Ardmore, Alabama, United States
- Origin: Nashville, Tennessee
- Genres: Country
- Occupations: Singer-songwriter, record producer
- Instrument: Vocals
- Years active: 2014–present
- Labels: Red Bow, Stoney Creek, MV2 Entertainment
- Member of: New Voice Entertainment

David Fanning (born June 12, 1986) is an American country music singer, songwriter, record producer, and talent manager.

Fanning has produced albums for Parmalee and Thompson Square, including three number 1 songs: "Are You Gonna Kiss Me or Not" (2010), "If I Didn't Have You" (2012), and "Carolina" (2013). He also co-wrote "Musta Had a Good Time" (2012), performed by Parmalee, "Trippin' on Us" (2013), performed by Lindsay Ell, and "Tennessee Orange" (2022), performed by Megan Moroney. He is also the talent manager for Avery Anna and has produced many of her songs.

== Biography ==
Fanning was born and grew up in Ardmore, Alabama, on the border between Alabama and Tennessee. He spent his childhood on a 100-acre horse farm. He became proficient with Pro Tools at age 14.

When he was 21, he was introduced to and joined New Voice Entertainment.

Fanning signed to Red Bow Records (later Stoney Creek Records), a division of BBR Music Group. In 2010, he met Parmalee and introduced the band to BBR.

In April 2014, at the request of Storme Warren, Fanning recorded a country music cover version of "Drink You Away" by Justin Timberlake. In May 2014, the song debuted at number 60 on the Country Airplay chart and peaked at number 58.

In July 2014, he performed at the Buckle Up Music Festival.

In April 2015, he released "Doin' Country Right", written by Jimmy Robbins, Josh Osborne, and Heather Morgan.

In November 2015, Fanning signed to MV2 Entertainment, a music publishing, artist development and management company.

In December 2015, he released "What's Next", co-written with Cary Barlowe and James Moore.

In September 2016, Fanning released his debut EP, First, via MV2 Entertainment.

In 2017, he toured schools in rural areas without regular access to live concerts to promote the importance of music education.

In March 2019, he signed a global publishing deal with RED Creative Group.

In 2021, after viewing a viral video, Fanning contacted Avery Anna via Instagram and signed her to a talent manager and production contract.

In March 2025, he launched Off Road Records in partnership with Reservoir Media.

== Discography ==
=== Extended plays ===
Year	Album details
2016	First - EP: Released: September 23, 2016; Label: MV2 Entertainment; Formats: music download
2017	Dreamers: Released: September 1, 2017; Label: MV2 Entertainment; Formats: CD, music download

=== Singles ===
Year	Single	Peak positions	Album
Year	Single	US Country Airplay	Album
2014	"Drink You Away"	58	singles only
2015	"Doin' Country Right"	60	singles only
2015	"What's Next"	—	singles only
2017	"First"	—	First - EP

=== Music videos ===
Year	Video
2017	"First"
2017	"Ridin' to the Beat"
2018	"Lovers"

== Awards and nominations ==
Year	Organization	Award	Nominee/Work	Result	Ref
2023	Country Music Association Awards	Song of the Year	"Tennessee Orange" with Paul Jenkins, Megan Moroney and Ben Williams	Pending	
