= Lindsay Ell =

Canadian-American country music singer

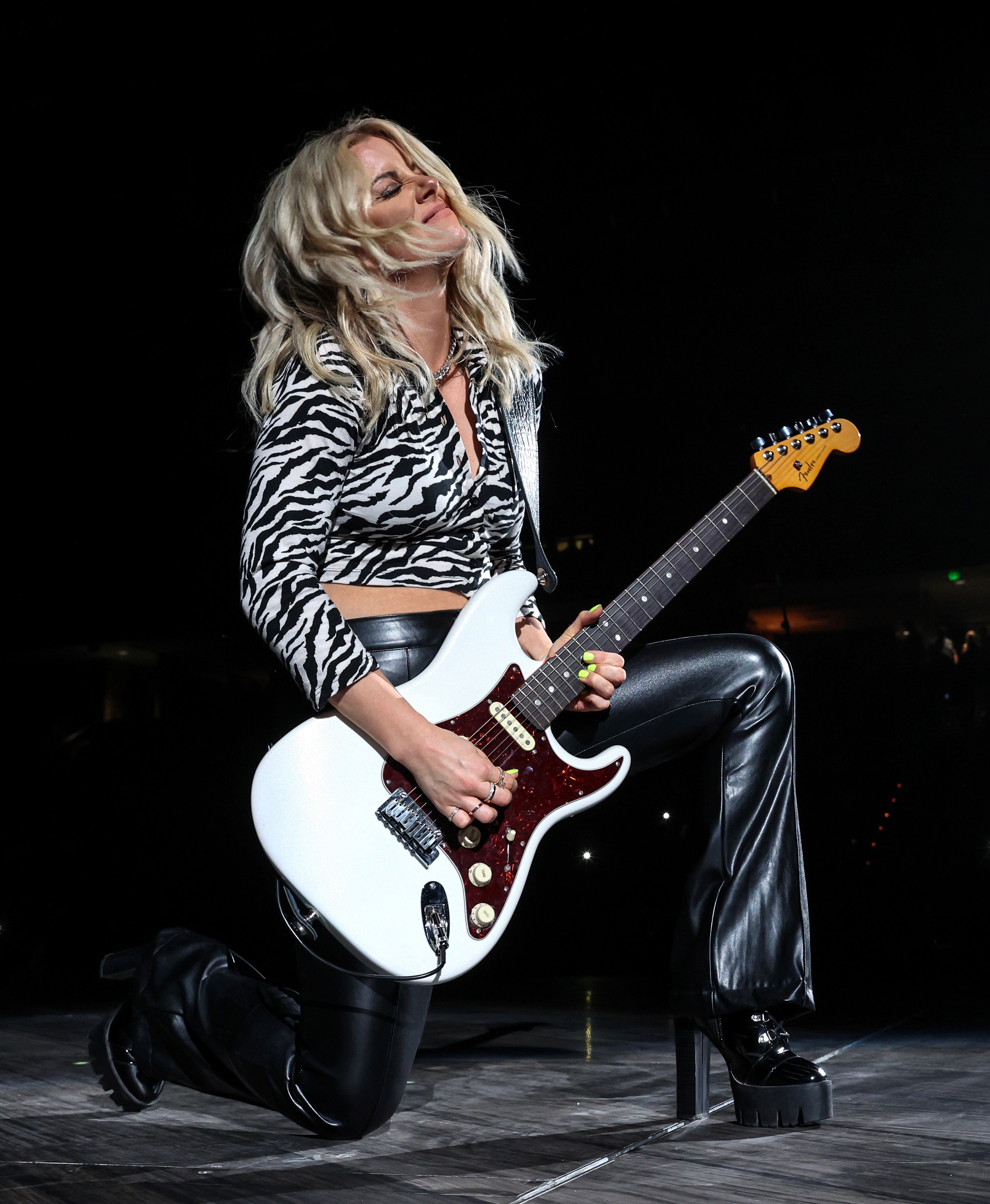
- Lindsay Ell on the Friends and Heroes Tour (2021)

Background information
- Born: Lindsay Elizabeth Ell; 20 March 1989 (age 37); Calgary, Alberta, Canada
- Genres: Country pop; pop rock
- Occupations: Singer, songwriter, guitarist
- Instruments: Vocals, acoustic guitar, electric guitar, mandolin, ukulele, piano, banjo
- Years active: 2003–present
- Labels: Universal Music Canada; Stoney Creek Records
- Website: lindsayell.com

Lindsay Elizabeth Ell (born 20 March 1989) is a Canadian-American country pop singer, songwriter, guitarist and television personality from Calgary, Alberta. Her music incorporates elements of rock and blues. Her debut extended play, Worth the Wait, was released in March 2017. Her first full-length country album, The Project, was released in August 2017 and debuted at No. 1 on the Billboard Country Album Sales chart. From 2022 to 2025, she was the host of the revived Canada's Got Talent reality television series.

== Early life ==
Lindsay Ell was born in Calgary. She started playing the piano at six, until she discovered her father's collection of guitars scattered throughout the house, switching at age eight; "I fell in love with the guitar," says Lindsay. "It's a huge part of who I am." Lindsay fell in love with the blues and started songwriting at age 10. Ell was valedictorian for her class at Bishop Carroll High School, from which she graduated a year early. She went on to study business at the University of Calgary and music at the Berklee College of Music, in addition to pursuing her music career.

== Career ==
Randy Bachman discovered Ell when she was only 15 years old. Bachman described her as "the most talented and multi-faceted artist I've come across in many years". Bachman co-wrote and produced her first album Consider This. It was recorded at Bachman's studio on Saltspring Island, and Ell herself co-wrote most of the 11 songs. The album was released in 2006 on Bachman's record label Ranbach Music and distributed by Fontana North. Ell toured with blues guitarist Buddy Guy in 2008. On her 2009 album, Alone, she moved to a more acoustic sound compared to her debut.

It was her first songwriting trip to Nashville that brought her full circle to her country roots. She travelled back and forth from Calgary to Nashville for a couple years to participate in songwriting sessions while playing as many live shows as she could to hone her craft. At the age of 21, she permanently moved to Nashville and signed with the US-based record label Stoney Creek Records.

In December 2013, her first official single, "Trippin' on Us", debuted as the most added song for country music radio in both Canada and the United States with over 50 first week adds. Ell has since been called "a true triple threat" by Guitar World; "a star in the making" by Taste of Country and "a distinct figure in the modern country recording camp" by Country Weekly. Lindsay is a guitarist and her style has been influenced by John Mayer, Keith Urban, Stevie Ray Vaughan, Tommy Emmanuel, Chet Atkins, Buddy Guy, Randy Bachman, Eric Clapton and Jimi Hendrix. She typically plays a custom Les Paul Goddess and Martin acoustic guitars. She is an official Martin Guitar artist.

Lindsay made her Grand Ole Opry debut on 15 April 2014 and has since made several appearances on the show. On 24 March 2017, Lindsay released her debut EP, Worth the Wait, featuring six songs, one of which is a cover of John Mayer's "Stop This Train". "Worth the Wait shows off Ell's talent in all capacities, as a guitarist, vocalist and songwriter," wrote Sounds Like Nashville in a review of the project. On 28 January 2018, Lindsay sang the Canadian National Anthem at the 2018 NHL All-Star Game. In March 2018, she performed at the C2C: Country to Country festival in the UK. On 29 July 2020 upon her label's request Lindsay flew to Nashville to perform a remix as a guest artist on her label mate Tucker Beathard's newly released single titled "Faithful". The track was the first promotional single released upon the announcement Beathard's upcoming album titled KING, however the version that features her was left off of the album and was instead only able to be streamed via YouTube.

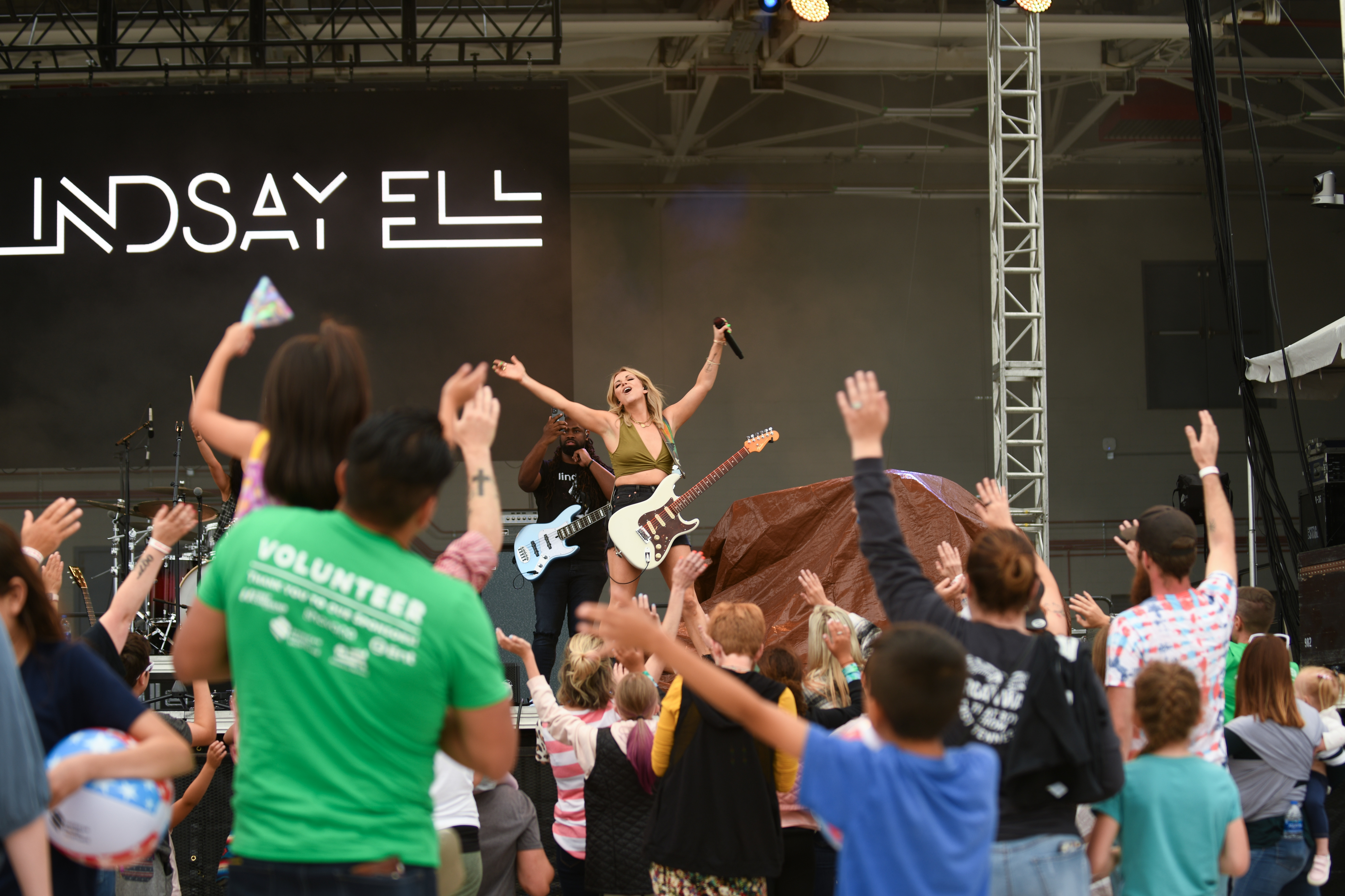
Ell performing in Aurora, Colorado in 2022

On 14 August 2020, Ell released her fifth studio album, Heart Theory, featuring the singles "I Don't Love You", "Want Me Back", and "Good on You". In October 2021, it was announced that Ell will host the second season of Canada's Got Talent, which aired in 2022. She served alongside Priyanka as cohost of the 2021 Canadian Country Music Awards.

In 2023, Ell departed Stoney Creek Records and the BBR Music Group. She subsequently released the single "Sweet Spot". Her song "Right on Time" was named "Single of the Year" at the 2023 Canadian Country Music Awards. Ell was named the recipient of the Gary Slaight Music Humanitarian Award at the 2024 Canadian Country Music Awards for her work establishing The Make You Movement fund and support for sexual assault survivors and the LGBTQ2SIA+ community.

In 2023, Ell performed as one of the support acts on Shania Twain's Queen of Me Tour. In 2024, she joined Twain for her third Las Vegas residency at PH Live as guitarist. Later that year, she signed with Universal Music Canada, and released an extended play titled Love Myself on October 25, 2024. The EP included her debut pop single "Story I Tell Myself". She also appeared in the country music documentary Rebel Country in June 2024.

== Personal life ==
Ell officially became an American citizen on December 8, 2022. In February 2023, she revealed that she has been battling an eating disorder for many years that was only recently diagnosed.

== Tours ==
- We Are Pioneers World Tour (2013/2014) – supporting The Band Perry
- CMT Next Women of Country Tour (2016) – supporting Jennifer Nettles
- Life Amplified World Tour (2017) – supporting Brad Paisley
- Weekend Warrior World Tour (2017/2018) – supporting Brad Paisley
- Still the Same Tour (2018) - supporting Sugarland
- Graffiti U World Tour (2018) – supporting Keith Urban
- Monster Energy Outbreak Tour (2018/2019) - headlining
- Friends and Heroes Tour (2021) - supporting Blake Shelton
- wAnt me back tour (2021) - headlining, with Robyn Ottolini supporting
- From the Fire Tour (2023) - supporting Zac Brown Band

Lindsay Ell was selected by The Band Perry to open for their "We Are Pioneers World Tour" which included 50 dates throughout Europe and North America during 2013 and 2014. She has also supported tours with Shania Twain (support act for Queen of Me Tour and then guitarist for her Come On Over Las Vegas residency), Keith Urban, Luke Bryan, Buddy Guy, Big & Rich, Gretchen Wilson, Ronnie Dunn, Paul Brandt, Chris Isaak and Blake Shelton. In 2021, Lindsay Ell completed her first Canadian headlining tour, with special guest Robyn Ottolini supporting.

== Discography ==
- Consider This (2008)
- Alone (2009)
- The Project (2017)
- The Continuum Project (2018)
- Heart Theory (2020)
- The Love Myself Collection (2025)

== Awards and nominations ==
Year	Award show	Category	Nominated work	Result	Ref
2014	Canadian Country Music Association	Rising Star	Lindsay Ell	Nominated	
2014	Canadian Country Music Association	All Star Band - Guitar	Lindsay Ell	Nominated	
2015	Canadian Country Music Association	Rising Star	Lindsay Ell	Nominated	
2015	Association of Country Music in Alberta	Female Artist of the Year	Lindsay Ell	Won	
2016	CMT Music Awards	Social Superstar	Lindsay Ell	Nominated	
2016	Canadian Country Music Association	Female Artist of the Year	Lindsay Ell	Nominated	
2017	Canadian Country Music Association	Female Artist of the Year	Lindsay Ell	Nominated	
2018	Canadian Country Music Association	Female Artist of the Year	Lindsay Ell	Nominated	
2018	Canadian Country Music Association	Album of the Year	The Project	Nominated	
2019	Academy of Country Music Awards	New Female Artist of the Year	Lindsay Ell	Nominated	
2019	CMT Music Awards	Collaborative Video of the Year	"What Happens in a Small Town" (with Brantley Gilbert)	Nominated	
2019	Canadian Country Music Association	Female Artist of the Year	Lindsay Ell	Nominated	
2019	Canadian Country Music Association	Interactive Artist of the Year	Lindsay Ell	Won	
2019	Canadian Country Music Association	Single of the Year	"Criminal"	Nominated	
2019	Canadian Country Music Association	Video of the Year	"Criminal"	Nominated	
2019	Country Music Association Awards	Musical Event of the Year	"What Happens in a Small Town" (with Brantley Gilbert)	Nominated	
2020	Academy of Country Music Awards	New Female Artist of the Year	Lindsay Ell	Nominated	
2020	Academy of Country Music Awards	Music Event of the Year	"What Happens in a Small Town" (with Brantley Gilbert)	Nominated	
2020	Canadian Country Music Association	Female Artist of the Year	Lindsay Ell	Nominated	
2020	Canadian Country Music Association	Interactive Artist of the Year	Lindsay Ell	Won	
2021	Juno Awards of 2021	Country Album of the Year	heart theory	Nominated	
2021	2021 Canadian Country Music Awards	Album of the Year	heart theory	Nominated	
2021	2021 Canadian Country Music Awards	Female Artist of the Year	Lindsay Ell	Nominated	
2021	2021 Canadian Country Music Awards	Interactive Artist of the Year	Lindsay Ell	Won	
2021	2021 Canadian Country Music Awards	Songwriter of the Year	"Good on You" (with Sam Ellis and Micah Premnath)	Nominated	
2021	2021 Canadian Country Music Awards	Video of the Year	"Want Me Back"	Nominated	
2022	Canadian Country Music Awards	Female Artist of the Year	Lindsay Ell	Nominated	
2022	Canadian Country Music Awards	Music Video of the Year	"Right on Time"	Nominated	
2022	Country Music Association Awards	International Artist Achievement Award	Lindsay Ell	Nominated	
2023	Canadian Country Music Awards	Female Artist of the Year	Lindsay Ell	Nominated	
2023	Canadian Country Music Awards	Single of the Year	"Right on Time"	Won	
2024	Canadian Country Music Awards	Female Artist of the Year	Lindsay Ell	Nominated	
