= Luke Laird discography =

Luke Robert Laird is an American country music songwriter and producer. This article lists all of the songs that he has had a hand in writing as well as those that he has produced.

== Songwriting discography ==
List of singles as songwriter, showing year released, artist, album, title, and co-writers
Year	Artist	Album	Song	Co-written with
2005	Lee Ann Womack	There's More Where That Came From	"Painless"	Hillary Lindsey, Bill Luther
2005	Beulah	Mabel And I	"Stay"	Beulah Garside
2005	Katharine McPhee	Unbroken	"Say Goodbye"	Hillary Lindsey, Troy Verges, Aimee Mayo, Chris Lindsey
2007	Tim McGraw	Let It Go	"Put Your Lovin' On Me"	Hillary Lindsey
2007	Rascal Flatts	Still Feels Good	"Help Me Remember"	Hillary Lindsey, Edward Hill
2007	Carrie Underwood	Carnival Ride	"So Small"	Carrie Underwood, Hillary Lindsey
2007	Carrie Underwood	Carnival Ride	"Last Name"	Carrie Underwood, Hillary Lindsey
2007	Carrie Underwood	Carnival Ride	"Twisted"	Brett James, Hillary Lindsey
2008	Crystal Shawanda	Dawn of a New Day	"Try"	Hillary Lindsey, Edward Hill
2008	Jessica Simpson	Do You Know	"You're My Sunday"	Jessica Simpson, Hillary Lindsey
2008	Jessica Simpson	Do You Know	"Sipping On History"	Jessica Simpson, Hillary Lindsey
2008	Phil Stacey	Phil Stacey	"Find You"	busbee
2009	Emerson Drive	Believe	"That Kind of Beautiful"	Hillary Lindsey, Gordie Sampson
2009	Emerson Drive	Believe	"Your Last"	Lisa Carver
2009	Mitchel Musso	Mitchel Musso	"Get Out"	Lindy Robbins, Matthew Wilder
2009	Joe Nichols	Old Things New	"Figure That One Out"	
2009	Carrie Underwood	Play On	"Mama's Song"	Carrie Underwood, Kara DioGuardi, Marti Frederiksen
2009	Carrie Underwood	Play On	"Undo It"	Carrie Underwood, Kara DioGuardi, Marti Frederiksen
2009	Carrie Underwood	Play On	"Temporary Home"	Carrie Underwood, Zac Maloy
2009	Carrie Underwood	Play On	"Play On"	Carrie Underwood, Natalie Hemby
2009	Holly Williams	Here with Me	"Keep the Change"	Hillary Lindsey
2010	Trace Adkins	Cowboy's Back In Town	"Don't Mind If I Don't"	Ashley Gorley
2010	Laura Bell Bundy	Achin' and Shakin'	"Boyfriend?"	Laura Bell Bundy, Barry Dean
2010	Laura Bell Bundy	Achin' and Shakin'	"Everybody"	Laura Bell Bundy, Mike Shimshack
2010	Sarah Buxton	Sarah Buxton	"Big Blue Sky"	Jedd Hughes
2010	Amy Grant	Somewhere Down the Road	"Overnight"	Amy Grant, Natalie Hemby, Audrey Spillman
2010	Jessica Harp	A Woman Needs	"Good Enough For Me"	Hillary Lindsey, Carrie Underwood
2010	Little Big Town	The Reason Why	"Shut Up Train"	Hillary Lindsey, Chris Tompkins
2010	Katharine McPhee	Unbroken	"Last Letter"	Katharine McPhee, Barry Dean
2010	Katharine McPhee	Unbroken	"Anybody's Heart"	Katharine McPhee, Barry Dean
2010	Blake Shelton	Hillbilly Bone	"Hillbilly Bone" (featuring Trace Adkins)	Craig Wiseman
2010	Clay Walker	She Won't Be Lonely Long	"People In Planes"	Barry Dean
2010	Cassandra Wilson feat. John Legend	Silver Pony	"Watch The Sunrise"	John Legend, Steven Jones
2010	Jasmine Rae	Look It Up	"Can't a Girl Change Her Mind"	Hillary Lindsey, Katrina Elam
2010	William Topley	Water Taxi (Deluxe Edition)	"Dawn"	—N/a
2011	Lauren Alaina	Wildflower	"Funny Thing About Love"	Lauren Alaina, Brett James
2011	Rodney Atkins	Take a Back Road	"Take a Back Road"	Rhett Akins
2011	Francesca Battistelli	Hundred More Years	"So Long"	Francesca Battistelli
2011	Jason Michael Carroll	Numbers	"Hell or Hallelujah"	Jason Michael Carroll, Jeremy Spillman
2011	Charlotte Church	Back to Scratch	"Suitcase"	Barry Dean, Charlotte Church
2011	Charlotte Church	Back to Scratch	"Unraveling"	Barry Dean, Charlotte Church
2011	Charlotte Church	Back to Scratch	"The Story Of Us"	Barry Dean, Charlotte Church
2011	Eric Church	Chief	"Hungover & Hard Up"	Eric Church
2011	Eric Church	Chief	"Over When It's Over"	Eric Church
2011	Eric Church	Chief	"Drink in My Hand	Eric Church, Michael P. Henney
2011	Sara Evans	Stronger	"A Little Bit Stronger"	Hillary Lindsey, Hillary Scott
2011	Sara Evans	Stronger	"Life Without Losing"	Sara Evans, Barry Dean, Andrew Dorff
2011	Miranda Lambert	Four the Record	"Fine Tune"	Natalie Hemby
2011	Miranda Lambert	Four the Record	"Baggage Claim"	Miranda Lambert, Natalie Hemby
2011	Steve Moakler	Watching Time Run	"Best Thing"	Steve Moakler
2011	Xenia	Send You Hope	"Snapshot"	David Hodges, Hillary Lindsey
2011	Jesse Lee	Come After Me	"If I Were You"	—N/a
2012	Boys Like Girls	Crazy World	"Life of the Party"	Martin Johnson
2012	Boys Like Girls	Crazy World	"Shoot"	Martin Johnson
2012	Lee Brice	Hard 2 Love	"Parking Lot Party"	Lee Brice, Thomas Rhett, Rhett Akins
2012	Luke Bryan	Spring Break…Here to Party	"Little Bit Later On"	Luke Bryan, Ashley Gorley
2012	Florida Georgia Line	Here's to the Good Times	"Party People"	Shane McAnally, J. T. Harding
2012	Brandon Heath	Blue Mountain	"Blue Mountain"	Barry Dean, Brandon Heath
2012	Megan Hilty	It Happens All The Time	"Walk Away"	Carrie Underwood, Ne-Yo
2012	Little Big Town	Tornado	"Pontoon"	Barry Dean, Natalie Hemby
2012	Little Big Town	Tornado	"On Fire Tonight"	Karen Fairchild, Kimberly Schlapman, Phillip Sweet, Jimi Westbrook
2012	Neal McCoy	XII	"A-OK"	Barry Dean, Brett Eldredge
2012	Jennette McCurdy	Jennette McCurdy	"Put Your Arms Around Someone"	Jennette McCurdy, Jessi Alexander
2012	Jennette McCurdy	Jennette McCurdy	"Have To Say Goodbye"	Jennette McCurdy, Jessi Alexander
2012	Tim McGraw	Emotional Traffic	"Halo"	Jedd Hughes
2012	Ne-Yo	R.E.D.	"She Is"	Ne-Yo
2012	Jay Sean, Jewel, Owl City	Child Hunger Ends Here (ConAgra Foods)	"Here's Hope"	Hunter Hayes, Barry Dean
2012	Carrie Underwood	Blown Away	"Nobody Ever Told You"	Carrie Underwood, Hillary Lindsey
2012	Carrie Underwood	Blown Away	"Thank God for Hometowns"	Ashley Gorley, Hillary Lindsey
2012	Carrie Underwood	Blown Away	"One Way Ticket"	Carrie Underwood, Josh Kear
2012	Chris Young	Neon	"You"	Chris Young
2012	Trent Dabbs	Future Like Snow	"Hoping for Home"	Barry Dean
2013	Jason Aldean	Night Train	"1994"	Barry Dean, Thomas Rhett
2013	Lee Brice	Hard 2 Love	"Parking Lot Party"	Lee Brice, Rhett Akins, Thomas Rhett
2013	Luke Bryan	Crash My Party	"I See You"	Luke Bryan, Ashley Gorley
2013	Luke Bryan	Crash My Party	"Your Mama Should've Named You Whiskey"	Thomas Rhett, Jeremy Spillman
2013	Joel Crouse	Ever the River Runs	"If You Want Some"	Joel Crouse, Jamie Houston
2013	Sheryl Crow	Feels Like Home	"We Oughta Be Drinkin'"	Sheryl Crow, Chris DuBois
2013	Sheryl Crow	Feels Like Home	"Homecoming Queen"	Brandy Clark, Shane McAnally
2013	Ronnie Dunn	Peace, Love, and Country Music	"I Wish I Still Smoked Cigarettes"	Barry Dean, Lori McKenna
2013	Brett Eldredge	Bring You Back	"On and On"	Brett Eldredge, Shane McAnally
2013	Brett Eldredge	Bring You Back	"Gotta Get There"	Brett Eldredge, Barry Dean
2013	Amy Grant	How Mercy Looks from Here	"I'm Not Giving Up On You"	Molly Reed
2013	Amy Grant	How Mercy Looks from Here	"Not Giving Up"	Amy Grant, Marshall Altman, Molly Reed
2013	Hunter Hayes	Hunter Hayes	"Somebody's Heartbreak"	Hunter Hayes, Andrew Dorff
2013	Toby Keith	Drinks After Work	"Drinks After Work"	Natalie Hemby, Barry Dean
2013	Lady Antebellum	Golden	"Downtown"	Shane McAnally, Natalie Hemby
2013	Tim McGraw	Two Lanes of Freedom	"One of Those Nights"	Rodney Clawson, Chris Tompkins
2013	Kacey Musgraves	Same Trailer Different Park	"Blowin' Smoke"	Kacey Musgraves, Shane McAnally
2013	Kacey Musgraves	Same Trailer Different Park	"I Miss You"	Kacey Musgraves, Josh Osbourne
2013	Kacey Musgraves	Same Trailer Different Park	"Back On The Map"	Kacey Musgraves
2013	Kacey Musgraves	Same Trailer Different Park	"It Is What It Is"	Kacey Musgraves, Brandy Clark
2013	Kacey Musgraves	Same Trailer Different Park	"Step Off"	Kacey Musgraves, Shane McAnally
2013	Jake Owen	Days of Gold	"Tall Glass of Something"	Barry Dean, Jaren Johnston
2013	Brad Paisley	Wheelhouse	"Beat This Summer"	Brad Paisley, Chris DuBois
2013	Thomas Rhett	It Goes Like This	"Call Me Up"	Rhett Akins, Shane McAnally
2013	Darius Rucker	True Believers	"Radio"	Darius Rucker, Ashley Gorley
2013	Thompson Square	Just Feels Good	"Testing The Water"	Shane McAnally, Hillary Lindsey
2013	Tyler Farr	Redneck Crazy	"Dirty"	Rhett Akins, Tyler Farr
2014	Frankie Ballard	Sunshine & Whiskey	"Sunshine & Whiskey"	Jaren Johnston
2014	Frankie Ballard	Sunshine & Whiskey	"Drinky Drink"	Jaren Johnston
2014	Kenny Chesney	The Big Revival	"American Kids"	Kenny Chesney, Shane McAnally
2014	Eric Church	The Outsiders	"Give Me Back My Hometown"	Eric Church
2014	Gloriana	Best Night Ever Single	"Best Night Ever"	Ashley Gorley, Hillary Lindsey
2014	Lucy Hale	Road Between	"You Sound Good to Me"	Ashley Gorley, Hillary Lindsey
2014	Hunter Hayes	Storyline	"Wild Card"	Hunter Hayes, Barry Dean
2014	Lady Antebellum	747	"Damn You Seventeen"	Shane McAnally, Rodney Clawson
2014	Lady Antebellum	747	"Slow Rollin'"	Rodney Clawson
2014	Miranda Lambert	Platinum	"Hard Staying Sober"	Miranda Lambert, Natalie Hemby
2014	Miranda Lambert	Platinum	"Smokin' and Drinkin'"	Natalie Hemby, Shane McAnally
2014	Tim McGraw	Sundown Heaven Town	"Lincoln Continentals And Cadillacs"	Rodney Clawson, Ashley Gorley
2014	Tim McGraw	Sundown Heaven Town	"Diamond Rings and Old Barstools"	Barry Dean, Jonathan Singleton
2014	Kacey Musgraves	Same Trailer Different Park	"Keep It To Yourself"	Kacey Musgraves Shane McAnally
2014	Angaleena Presley	American Middle Class	"Surrender"	Angaleena Presley, Barry Dean
2014	Blake Shelton	Bringing Back the Sunshine	"Gonna"	Craig Wiseman
2014	Blake Shelton	Bringing Back the Sunshine	"Anyone Else"	Barry Dean, Natalie Hemby
2014	Blake Shelton	Bringing Back the Sunshine	"Messed Up"	Shane McAnally, Ashley Gorley
2014	Dallas Smith	Tippin Point	"Slow Rollin'"	Rodney Clawson
2014	Thompson Square	Just Feels Good	"Testing The Water"	Shane McAnally, Hillary Lindsey
2014	Carrie Underwood	—N/a	"Keep Us Safe"	Carrie Underwood, Hillary Lindsey, Shane McAnally
2014	Nikki Lane	All Or Nothin'	"Sleep With A Stranger"	Barry Dean
2014	Native Run	Good On You - EP	"Cheap Thrill"	Shane McAnally, Bryan Dawley, Rachel Beauregard
2015	Luke Bryan	Crash My Party	"I See You"	Luke Bryan, Ashley Gorley
2015	Eric Church	The Outsiders	"Talladega"	Eric Church
2015	Skylar Grey	Furious 7	"I Will Return"	Skylar Grey, J.R. Rotem
2015	Ashley Monroe	The Blade	"On To Something Good"	Barry Dean, Ashley Monroe
2015	Cam	Untamed	"Half Broke Heart"	Camaron Ochs, Tyler Johnson
2015	Kacey Musgraves	Pageant Material	"High Time"	Kacey Musgraves, Shane McAnally
2015	Kacey Musgraves	Pageant Material	"Dime Store Cowgirl"	Kacey Musgraves, Shane McAnally
2015	Kacey Musgraves	Pageant Material	"Pageant Material"	Kacey Musgraves, Shane McAnally
2015	Kacey Musgraves	Pageant Material	"This Town"	Kacey Musgraves, Brandy Clark
2015	Kacey Musgraves	Pageant Material	"Die Fun"	Kacey Musgraves, Shane McAnally
2015	Kacey Musgraves	Pageant Material	"Good Ol' Boys Club"	Kacey Musgraves, Natalie Hemby
2015	Kacey Musgraves	Pageant Material	"Late To The Party"	Josh Osborne, Brandy Clark
2015	Jon Pardi	California Sunrise	"Head Over Boots	Jon Pardi
2015	RaeLynn	Me EP	"Better Do It"	Barry Dean, RaeLynn
2015	Thomas Rhett	Tangled Up	"T-Shirt"	Ashley Gorley, Shane McAnally
2015	Thomas Rhett	Tangled Up	"The Day You Stop Lookin' Back"	Jaren Johnston
2015	Tim McGraw	Damn Country Music (Deluxe Edition)	"Everybody's Lookin'"	Rodney Clawson
2015	Mickey Guyton	Mickey Guyton	"Somebody Else Will"	Ashley Gorley, Hillary Lindsey
2015	Lindsay Ell	—N/a	"By The Way"	Barry Dean, Barry Dean George, Lindsay Ell
2015	Bret Michaels	True Grit	"Girls on Bars"	–
2015	Sam Hunt	Between The Pines (Acoustic Mixtape)	"Vacation - Acoustic Mixtape"	JT Harding, Sam Hunt
2016	Brandy Clark	Big Day in a Small Town	"Homecoming Queen"	Brandy Clark, Shane McAnally
2016	Jake Owen	American Love	"American Love"	Jaren Johnston
2016	Jake Owen	American Love	"If He Ain't Gonna Love You"	Shane McAnally, Chris Stapleton
2016	Luke Bryan	Kill the Lights	"Fast"	Luke Bryan, Rodney Clawson
2016	Jon Pardi	California Sunrise	"Head Over Boots"	Jon Pardi
2016	Jon Pardi	California Sunrise	"Paycheck"	Barry Dean, Jon Pardi
2016	Drake White	Spark	"Livin' the Dream"	Tom Douglas, Jaren Johnston
2016	Ingrid Michaelson	It Doesn't Have to Make Sense	"Hell No"	Barry Dean, Ingrid Michaelson
2016	Ingrid Michaelson	It Doesn't Have to Make Sense	"Celebrate"	Barry Dean, Ingrid Michaelson
2016	Jordan Rager	Southern Boy EP	"Southern Boy" (with Jason Aldean)	Barry Dean, Jeremy Stover
2016	Dierks Bentley	Black	"Can't be Replaced"	Hillary Lindsey, Dierks Bentley
2016	Maren Morris	Hero	"Drunk Girls Don't Cry"	Barry Dean, Maren Morris
2016	Chris Lane	Girl Problems	"Saturday Night"	Ashley Gorley, Shane McAnally
2016	The Cadillac Three	Bury Me in My Boots	"Buzzin'"	Jaren Johnston
2016	NEEDTOBREATHE	HARDLOVE	"Let's Stay Home Tonight"	Bear Rinehart, Bo Rinehart
2016	Nashville Cast	The Music of Nashville, Season 4, Vol. 2	"Soul Survivor"	Barry Dean, Natalie Hemby
2016	Sister Hazel	Lighter in the Dark	"That Kind of Beautiful"	Hillary Lindsey, Gordie Sampson
2016	Native Run	When I'm Taken EP	"BIC Lighter"	Barry Dean, Lori McKenna
2016	Native Run	When I'm Taken EP	"When I'm Taken"	Rachel Beauregard, Luke Brindley, Bryan Dawley, Ashley Gorley
2016	Cole Taylor	Step 2	"Girl from a Little Town"	—N/a
2016	Meghan Patrick	Grace & Grit	"Breaking Records"	Ashley Gorley, Hillary Lindsey
2016	Lori McKenna	The Bird & the Rifle	"Old Men Young Women"	Barry Dean, Lori McKenna
2016	Skylar Grey	Natural Causes	"Intro - Wilderness"	Holly Hafermann, Timothy Mckenzie
2017	Carly Pearce	Every Little Thing	"Hide the Wine"	Ashely Gorley, Hillary Lindsey
2017	Brandon Lay	Speakers	"Speakers, Bleachers and Preachers"	Brandon Lay, Shane McAnally
2017	Steve Moakler	Steel Town	"Suitcase"	Barry Dean, Thomas Rhett
2017	Steve Moakler	Steel Town	"Just Long Enough"	Barry Dean, Steve Moakler
2017	Little Big Town	The Breaker	"Free"	Barry Dean, Natalie Hemby, Lori McKenna
2017	Maren Morris	Hero Deluxe	"Company You Keep"	Shane McAnally, Maren Morris
2017	Old Dominion	Happy Endings	"Shoe Shopping"	Shane McAnally, Matthew Ramsey
2017	Midland	On the Rocks	"Out of Sight"	Jess Carson, Cameron Duddy, Mark Wystrach, Shane McAnally
2017	Rascal Flatts	Back to Us	"Vandalized"	Chris Stapleton
2017	Ingrid Michaelson	Alter Egos EP	"Celebrate"	Barry Dean, Ingrid Michaelson
2017	Mags Duval	Pink Cadillac Single	"Pink Cadillac"	Margaret Chapman, April Geesbreght, John Hill, Tiffany Vartanyan
2017	Mags Duval	Stay Lonely Single	"Stay Lonely"	Margaret Chapman, John Hill
2017	Mags Duval	Cinnamon Gum Single	"Cinnamon Gum"	Margaret Chapman, John Hill
2017	Mags Duval	Plain Jane Single	"Plain Jane"	Margaret Chapman, John Hill, Ben Stennis
2017	Mags Duval	Don't Ask Me Single	"Don't Ask Me"	Benny Blanco, Margaret Chapman, John Hill, Ammar Malik
2018	Kacey Musgraves	Golden Hour	"Butterflies"	Natalie Hemby, Kacey Musgraves
2018	Kacey Musgraves	Golden Hour	"Space Cowboy"	Shane McAnally, Kacey Musgraves
2018	Dierks Bentley	The Mountain	"You Can't Bring Me Down"	Dierks Bentley, Hillary Lindsey
2018	Devin Dawson	Dark Horse	"Dip"	Barry Dean, Devin Dawson
2018	Tenille Townes	Living Room Worktapes EP	"Somebody's Daughter"	Barry Dean, Tenille Townes
2018	Kassi Ashton	California Missouri Single	"California, Missouri"	Kassi Ashton, Shane McAnally
2018	Steve Moakler	Born Ready	"Born Ready"	Barry Dean, Steve Moakler
2018	Steve Moakler	Born Ready	"Hard Not to Love It"	Barry Dean, Steve Moakler
2018	Michael Ray	Amos	"Forget About It"	Jaren Johnston
2018	RaeLynn	Origins	"Better Do It"	Barry Dean, RaeLynn
2018	Lori McKenna	The Tree	"The Way Back Home"	Lori McKenna
2018	Lori McKenna	The Tree	"Young and Angry Again"	Barry Dean, Lori McKenna
2019	Steve Moakler	Blue Jeans	"Good Years"	Barry Dean
2019	Emerson Drive	Country People	"Country People"	Hillary Lindsey, Rodney Clawson
2019	George Strait	Honky Tonk Time Machine	"God And Country Music"	Barry Dean, Lori McKenna
2019	Jake Owen	Greetings From...Jake	"Down to the Honkytonk"	Shane McAnally, Rodney Clawson
2019	Rodney Atkins	Caught Up In The Country	"What Lonely Looks Like"	Barry Dean
2019	Thomas Rhett	Center Point Road	"Things You Do For Love"	Ashley Gorley, Jesse Frasure, Josh Osborne, Thomas Rhett
2019	Kassi Ashton	—N/a	"Field Party"	Kassi Ashton
2019	Alexis Ebert	Trailer Trashed	"Trailer Trashed"	Rodney Clawson
2019	Zac Brown Band	The Owl	"Me and the Boys in the Band"	Clay Cook, Zac Brown
2019	Jon Pardi, Lauren Alaina	Heartache Medication	"Don't Blame It On Whiskey"	Miranda Lambert, Eric Church, Michael P. Heeney
2019	Jon Pardi	Heartache Medication	"Tequila Little Time"	Rhett Akins, Jon Pardi
2019	Jon Pardi	Heartache Medication	"Me And Jack"	Rhett Akins, Bart Butler, Jon Pardi
2019	Jon Pardi	Heartache Medication	"Oughta Know That"	Bart Butler, Jon Pardi
2019	Barry Dean, Luke Laird	—N/a	"The Songs We Sing"	Barry Dean
2020	Dallas Smith	Timeless	"People I've Known"	Rodney Clawson
2020	Terry McBride	Rebels & Angels	"Lampasas Lady"	Brice Long, Terry McBride
2020	Terry McBride	Rebels & Angels	"Like Neon"	Brice Long, Marv Green, Terry McBride
2020	Terry McBride	Rebels & Angels	"Callin' All Hearts"	Terry McBride
2020	Terry McBride	Rebels & Angels	"Honky Tonkinest Time I Ever Had"	Terry McBride
2020	Terry McBride	Rebels & Angels	"Leave the Neon Light On"	Terry McBride
2020	The Cool Chips	The Cool Chips	"Don't Be Mean, Be Nice"	—N/a
2020	The Cool Chips	The Cool Chips	"Rocks, Worms, Dirt"	—N/a
2020	The Cool Chips	The Cool Chips	"I Don't Wanna Brush My Teeth"	—N/a
2020	The Cool Chips	The Cool Chips	"Night Night"	—N/a
2020	The Cool Chips	The Cool Chips	"Shootin' Hoops"	—N/a
2020	Steve Moakler	Blue Jeans	"Every Girl"	Josh Miller
2020	Sam Hunt	SOUTHSIDE	"Hard To Forget"	Ashley Gorle, Josh Osborne, Shane McAnally, Audrey Grisham, Mary Jean Shurtz, Russ Hull, Sam Hunt
2020	Tim McGraw	Here On Earth	"Hard To Stay Mad At"	Lori McKenna, Shane McAnally
2020	Luke Laird	Music Row	"Branch On The Tree"	Lori McKenna, Barry Dean
2020	Luke Laird	Music Row	"Country Music Will Never Die"	—N/a
2020	Luke Laird	Music Row	"Good Friends"	—N/a
2020	Luke Laird	Music Row	"Hangin' Out"	—N/a
2020	Luke Laird	Music Row	"Jake And Mack"	—N/a
2020	Luke Laird	Music Row	"Leaves On The Ground"	—N/a
2020	Luke Laird	Music Row	"Music Row"	—N/a
2020	Luke Laird	Music Row	"One More Divorce"	—N/a
2020	Luke Laird	Music Row	"That's Why I Don't Drink Anymore"	—N/a
2020	Luke Laird	Music Row	"Why I Am Who I Am"	—N/a
2020	Kassi Ashton	—N/a	"Black Motorcycle"	Kassi Ashton
2020	Eric Church	—N/a	"Through My Ray-Bans"	Barry Dean, Eric Church
2020	Dustin Lynch	Tullahoma	"The World Ain't Yours and Mine"	Matthew Ramsey, Rodney Clawson
2021	Anna Vaus	Wild Honey	"Girl In A Bar"	Anna Vaus
2021	BEXAR	—N/a	"Key to Life"	Barry Dean, Chris Ryan
2021	Brandy Clark	Your Life is a Record	"The Past is the Past"	Barry Dean, Brandy Clark
2021	Dillon Carmichael	Son Of A	"Leave The Lovin'"	Jaren Johnston
2021	Dillon Carmichael	Son Of A	"Man Made A Bar"	Shane McAnally, Jon Pardi
2021	Eric Church	Heart	"Crazyland"	Eric Church, Michael P. Heeney
2021	Eric Church	Heart	"People Break"	Eric Church
2021	Jeremy McComb	Frontier Rock	"Cotton's Gettin' High"	Josh Osborne, Shane McAnally
2021	Jojo Mason	Sky Full of Stars	"Broken Umbrella"	Hillary Lindsey, Jordan Davis
2021	Kassi Ashton	—N/a	"Heavyweight"	Hillary Lindsey, Kassi Ashton
2021	Lori McKenna	Christmas Is Right Here	"Christmas Without Crying"	Lori McKenna, Barry Dean
2021	Lori McKenna	Christmas Is Right Here	"Hail Mary"	Lori McKenna, Barry Dean
2021	Morgan Wallen	Dangerous: The Double Album	"Quittin’ Time"	Eric Church, Josh Thompson
2021	Rayne Johnson	Love Drunk or Lonely	"Vacation"	JT Harding, Sam Hunt
2021	Thomas Rhett	Country Again (Side A)	"Where We Grew Up"	Josh Miller, Thomas Rhett
2021	Walker Hayes	Country Stuff The Album	"AA"	Shane McAnally, Walker Hayes
2021	Wanda Jackson	Encore	"That's What Love Is"	Lori McKenna, Jordan Breanne Simpson, Wanda Jackson
2021	Zach Williams	Rescue Story (Deluxe Edition)	"Good To Know"	Jonathan Smith, Zach Williams
2022	Brandon Lay	—N/a	"Lipstick and Shotgun Shells"	Brandon Lay
2022	Cole Swindell	STEREOTYPE	"Miss Wherever"	Josh Miller, Chris La Corte, Cole Swindell
2022	Jake Owen	—N/a	"1x1"	Hillary Lindsey, Josh Miller
2022	Jon Pardi	Mr. Saturday Night	"New Place To Drink"	Jessie Jo Dillon, Jon Pardi
2022	Jon Pardi	Mr. Saturday Night	"Santa Cruz"	Jon Pardi
2022	Jon Pardi	Mr. Saturday Night	"Smokin' A Doobie"	Rhett Akins, Jon Pardi
2022	Jon Pardi	Mr. Saturday Night	"Workin' On A New One"	Rhett Akins, Jon Pardi
2022	Jonathan Hutcherson	—N/a	"Blue Collar"	Jonathan Hutcherson, Mark Trussell
2022	Kassi Ashton	—N/a	"Dates In Pickup Trucks"	David Garcia, Kassi Ashton
2022	Kassi Ashton	—N/a	"I Don't Go Back"	Hillary Lindsey, Kassi Ashton
2022	Luke Bryan	Prayin' In A Deer Stand	"Songs You Never Heard"	Josh Osborne, Luke Bryan
2022	Maddie & Tae, Morgane Stapleton	Through The Madness Vol. 1	"Don't Make Her Look Dumb"	Barry Dean, Maddie Font, Taylor Kerr
2022	Shadowlands	November Songs	"Hear You"	Brett Taylor, Sandra McCracken
2022	Shadowlands	November Songs	"Hold Together"	Brett Taylor, Sandra McCracken
2022	Shadowlands	November Songs	"Let My Heart Be Moved"	Brett Taylor, Sandra McCracken
2022	Shadowlands	November Songs	"Quiet Mind"	Brett Taylor, Sandra McCracken
2022	Shadowlands	November Songs	"Saving Me"	Brett Taylor, Sandra McCracken
2022	Shadowlands	November Songs	"Song For The Waiting"	Brett Taylor, Sandra McCracken
2022	Shelby Darrall	—N/a	"Brady"	Shelby Darrall
2022	Steve Moakler	Make A Little Room	"Let's Go To The Lake"	Barry Dean, Steve Moakler
2022	Thomas Rhett	Where We Started	"Simple As A Song"	Thomas Rhett, A1 Jacobs, Jimmie Crane, Jimmy Brewster, Josh Thompson
2023	Ian Munsick	White Buffalo	"Cowshit In The Morning"	Ian Munsick, Jeremy Spillman
2023	Jake Owen	Loose Cannon	"The Ending"	Chris Tompkins, Rodney Clawson
2023	Jonathan Hutcherson	—N/a	"Fight"	Casey Beathard, Jonathan Hutcherson
2023	Karley Scott Collins	Hands On The Wheel	"Loose Thread"	Brock Berryhill, Karley Scott Collins
2023	Larry Fleet	—N/a	"Daddy Don't Drink"	Derek Bahr, Larry Fleet
2023	Lori McKenna	1988	"Days Are Honey"	Barry Dean, Lori McKenna
2023	Lori McKenna	1988	"Killing Me (feat. Hillary Lindsey)"	Hillary Lindsey, Lori McKenna
2023	Megan Moroney	Lucky	"Kansas Anymore"	Megan Moroney, Lori McKenna, Rodney Clawson
2023	Nikita Karmen	Fantasy Island	"Get Even"	Hillary Lindsey, Shane McAnally, Carrie Underwood
2023	Amanda Kate Ferris	Pedal Steel	"When I Think About You"	Barry Dean, Lori McKenna
2023	Triston Marez	—N/a	"Too Soon For Goodbye"	Hillary Lindsey, Jon Pardi, Triston Marez
2023	Shawn Austin	Dirt Roads Downtown	"Settle For A Drink"	Morgan Wallen, Rodney Clawson
2024	Megan Moroney	Am I Okay?	"Am I Okay?"	Megan Moroney, Jessie Jo Dillon
2024	Megan Moroney	Am I Okay?	"Hope You're Happy"	Shane McAnally
2025	Eric Church	Evangeline vs. the Machine	"Johnny"	Eric Church, Brett Warren
2025	Eric Church	Evangeline vs. the Machine	"Evangeline"	Eric Church, Barry Dean
2025	James Barker Band	One of Us	"Real Cold Beer"	James Barker, Travis Wood
2026	Owen Riegling	In the Feeling	"Love Hate Love"	Owen Riegling, Luke Preston, Oscar Charles
2026	Megan Moroney	Cloud 9	"Cloud 9"	Jessie Jo Dillon, Ernest Keith Smith
2026	Megan Moroney	Cloud 9	"Liars, Tigers & Bears"	Jessie Jo Dillon
2026	Megan Moroney	Cloud 9	"Wish I Didn't"	Emily Weisband, Hillary Lindsay
2026	Megan Moroney	Cloud 9	"Who Hurt You"	Jessie Jo Dillon
2026	Megan Moroney	Cloud 9	"Waiting on the Rain"	Jessie Jo Dillon
2026	Kacey Musgraves	Middle of Nowhere	"Dry Spell"	Kacey Musgrave, Josh Osborne, Shane McAnally
2026	Kacey Musgraves	Middle of Nowhere	"I Believe in Ghosts"	Kacey Musgraves, Shane McAnally
2026	Kacey Musgraves	Middle of Nowhere	"Abilene"	Kacey Musgraves, Shane McAnally
2026	Kacey Musgraves	Middle of Nowhere	"Loneliest Girl"	Kacey Musgraves, Josh Osborne, Shane McAnally
2026	Kacey Musgraves	Middle of Nowhere	"Mexico Honey"	Kacey Musgraves, Steph Jones
2026	Kacey Musgraves	Middle of Nowhere	"Hell on Me"	Kacey Musgraves, Shane McAnally, Steph Jones

== Production discography ==
=== Albums ===
List of albums as producer, showing year released, artist, and album
Year	Artist	Album
2013	Kacey Musgraves	Same Trailer Different Park
2015	Kacey Musgraves	Pageant Material
2017	Steve Moakler	Steel Town
2018	Steve Moakler	Born Ready
2020	Everette	Kings of the Dairy Queen Parking Lot – Side A
2020	Luke Laird	Music Row
2020	Terry McBride	Rebels & Angels
2020	The Cool Chips	The Cool Chips
2020	Steve Moakler	Blue Jeans
2021	Anna Vaus	Wild Honey
2021	Lori McKenna	Christmas Is Right Here
2022	Everette	Kings of the Dairy Queen Parking Lot – Side B
2022	Shadowlands	November Songs

=== Songs ===
List of singles as producer, showing year released, artist, title, and album
Year	Artist	Tracks	Album
2012	Tamia	"Still"	Beautiful Surprise
2012	Tamia	"Is It Over Yet"	Beautiful Surprise
2012	Ne-Yo	"She Is"	R.E.D.
2013	Thomas Rhett	"Call Me Up"	It Goes Like This
2013	Thomas Rhett	"Get Me Some of That"	It Goes Like This
2013	Thomas Rhett	"Sorry for Partyin'"	It Goes Like This
2013	Brett Eldredge	"Gotta Get There	Bring You Back
2013	Brett Eldredge	"On And On"	Bring You Back
2015	CAM	"Half-Broke Heart"	Untamed
2016	Ingrid Michaelson	"Celebrate"	It Doesn't Have to Make Sense
2016	Muscadine Bloodline	"Gravel"	Movin' On
2016	Muscadine Bloodline	"Can't Tell You No"	Movin' On
2016	Muscadine Bloodline	"Movin' On"	Movin' On
2016	Muscadine Bloodline	"Put Me On a Pond"	Movin' On
2016	Muscadine Bloodline	"You on Me"	Movin' On
2016	Jake Owen	"If He Ain't Gonna Love You"	American Love
2017	Mickey Guyon	"Somebody Else Will"	Mickey Guyton
2017	Mags Duval	"Mean to Me"	—N/a
2017	Mags Duval	Tell Me Where to Park	—N/a
2017	Mags Duval	"Cinnamon Gum"	—N/a
2017	Mags Duval	"Plain Jane"	—N/a
2017	Mags Duval	"Don't Ask Me"	—N/a
2017	Mags Duval	"Pink Cadillac"	—N/a
2017	Mags Duval	"Stay Lonely"	—N/a
2017	Muscadine Bloodline	"CB Radio"	Muscadine Bloodline
2017	Muscadine Bloodline	"Depending on the Night"	Muscadine Bloodline
2017	Muscadine Bloodline	"Ginny"	Muscadine Bloodline
2017	Muscadine Bloodline	"WD-40"	Muscadine Bloodline
2017	Muscadine Bloodline	"Crickets and Cane Poles"	Muscadine Bloodline
2018	Kassi Ashton	"California, Missouri"	—N/a
2018	Kassi Ashton	"Taxidermy"	—N/a
2018	Alec Bailey	"Callin'"	—N/a
2019	Alec Bailey	"Flowerbomb"	—N/a
2019	Alec Bailey	"Grip"	—N/a
2019	Alec Bailey	"Lemonade"	—N/a
2019	Alec Bailey	"Roseanne"	—N/a
2019	Kassi Ashton	"Field Party"	—N/a
2019	Kassi Ashton	"Pretty Shiny Things"	—N/a
2019	Kassi Ashton	"Violins"	—N/a
2020	Kassi Ashton	"Black Motorcycle"	—N/a
2020	Kassi Ashton	"Hopeless"	—N/a
2020	Sam Hunt	"Hard To Forget"	Southside
2021	BEXAR	"Key To Life"	Pronounced BEAR
2021	JoJo Mason	"Broken Umbrella"	Sky Full Of Stars
2021	Kassi Ashton	"Heavyweight"	—N/a
2022	Anna Vaus	"Didn't Even Date"	Younger Version Of Myself
2022	Anna Vaus	"Kinda Don't Ever"	Younger Version Of Myself
2022	Anna Vaus	"Take It Easy On Me"	Younger Version Of Myself
2022	Anna Vaus	"Younger Version Of Myself"	Younger Version Of Myself
2022	Jonathan Hutcherson	"Blue Collar"	—N/a
2022	Kassi Ashton	"Dates In Pickup Trucks"	—N/a
2022	Kassi Ashton	"I Don't Go Back"	—N/a
2022	Shelby Darrall	"Brady"	—N/a
2022	Thomas Rhett	"Simple As A Song"	Where We Started
2023	Jonathan Hutcherson	"Dust"	Outta Here
2023	Jonathan Hutcherson	"Fight"	Outta Here
2023	Jonathan Hutcherson	"Makes A Man"	Outta Here
2023	Kassi Ashton	"Drive You Out Of My Mind"	—N/a
