= The Cloud 9 Tour =

2026 concert tour by Megan Moroney

- Tour by Megan Moroney
- Promotional poster
- Location: Europe; North America
- Associated album: Cloud 9
- Start date: May 29, 2026
- End date: May 14, 2027
- Legs: 3
- No. of shows: 52
- Supporting acts: Colin Lynch; JP Saxe; Laci Kaye Booth; Solon Holt

Megan Moroney concert chronology
- Am I Okay? Tour (2025); The Cloud 9 Tour (2026)

The Cloud 9 Tour is the ongoing fifth concert tour by American country singer Megan Moroney, in support of her third studio album, Cloud 9 (2026). The tour began on May 29, 2026, in Columbus, United States, and will conclude on May 14, 2027, in Brisbane, Australia.

== Background ==
Moroney announced 43 dates for the tour on December 4, 2025. Additional dates were announced a week later due to demand.

JP Saxe and Solon Holt were announced as the support acts for the United States shows in April 2026, while Colin Lynch is announced as a support act for her headlining set at Great Jones County Fair.

On 3 September 2026, an Australian Leg of the tour was announced for May 2027, promoted by Frontier Touring. Laci Kaye Booth will support on the Australian Leg. On October 22, 2026, it was announced that Colin Lynch will also support the Australian Leg of the tour.

== Setlist ==
This setlist was taken from the show in Columbus on May 29, 2026. It does not represent all shows throughout the tour.

1. "Stupid"
2. "Medicine"
3. "Bless Your Heart"
4. "Convincing"
5. "I'm Not Pretty"
6. "Change of Heart"
7. "No Caller ID"
8. "Wonder"
9. "Table for Two"
10. "Who Hurt You?"
11. "Liars & Tigers & Bears"
12. "Waiting on the Rain"
13. "Wedding Dress"
14. "Bells & Whistles"
15. "Cloud 9"
16. Surprise acoustic song
17. "Tennessee Orange"
18. "Beautiful Things"
19. "Wish I Didn't"
20. "Traitor (Roles Reversed)"
21. "Am I Okay?"
22. "Sorry... I Meant Tonight"
23. "6 Months Later"

=== Surprise acoustic songs ===
Moroney performs one surprise song from her discography at each show after "Cloud 9".

- May 29 – Columbus: "Hair Salon"
- May 30 – Indianapolis: "Break It Right Back"
- June 3 – Chicago: "Sleep on My Side"
- June 5 – Baltimore: "I Know You"
- June 6 – Greensboro: "Kansas Anymore"
- June 16 – Pittsburgh: "I Love Me"
- June 18 – Milwaukee: "Break It Right Back"
- June 20 – Toronto: "Fix You Too"
- July 7 – Boston: "I Bought a House"
- July 9 – Brooklyn: "The Girls"
- July 16 – Orlando: "Third Time's the Charm"
- July 17 – Tampa: "Girl in the Mirror"
- July 25 – Minneapolis: "Mustang or Me"
- July 26 – Lincoln: "Noah"
- August 1 – Portland: "Miss Universe"
- August 2 – Seattle: "Sad Songs for Sad People"
- August 18 – Detroit: "28th of June"
- August 21 – Nashville: "Noah" & "Hair Salon"
- August 22 – Nashville: "I Know You"
- August 27 – Denver: "Sad Songs for Sad People" & "Heaven By Noon"
- September 13 – Oslo: "Hair Salon"
- September 15 – Stockholm: "Noah"
- September 18 – Cologne: "Hope You're Happy"
- September 19 – Tilburg: "Sad Songs for Sad People"
- September 21 – Paris: "Bells & Whistles" & "Nothin' Crazy"
- September 23 – London: "Georgia Girl"
- September 26 – Manchester: "I Know You"
- September 27 – Glasgow: "Sleep on My Side"
- October 1 – Belfast: "Man on the Moon"

=== Notes ===
- At the show in Milwaukee, Moroney performed "Who's Your Daddy?"
- At the show in Toronto, JP Saxe joined Moroney on stage for "Why Johnny".
- At the show in Brooklyn, Benson Boone joined Moroney on stage to perform his song "Beautiful Things".
- At the show in Tampa, "Break It Right Back" was performed before "Am I Okay?"
- At the show in Minneapolis, Saxe joined Moroney on stage for "I Only Miss You".
- At the show in Glendale, Kameron Marlowe joined Moroney on stage to perform "Fix You Too".
- At the August 21 show in Nashville, Jessi Alexander joined Moroney on stage to perform an unreleased song, "You for Me", covered "What Are You Listening To?" with Solon Holt, and performed "Tequila" with Dan + Shay.
- At the August 22 show in Nashville, Saxe joined Moroney on stage for "I Only Miss You", performed "Need You Now" with Lady A, and performed "You Had to Be There" with Kenny Chesney.
- At the show in Denver, "Hair Salon", "Georgia Girl", "Indifferent", "Break It Right Back", and "Who's Your Daddy?" were played. Moroney also performed "I Will Always Love You" with Saxe, and covered "What Are You Listening To?" with Holt.

== Tour dates ==
List of 2026 concerts
Date (2026)	City	Country	Venue	Opening acts
May 29	Columbus	United States	Schottenstein Center	JP Saxe; Solon Holt
May 30	Indianapolis	United States	Gainbridge Fieldhouse	JP Saxe; Solon Holt
June 2	Chicago	United States	United Center	JP Saxe; Solon Holt
June 3	Chicago	United States	United Center	JP Saxe; Solon Holt
June 5	Baltimore	United States	CFG Bank Arena	JP Saxe; Solon Holt
June 6	Greensboro	United States	First Horizon Coliseum	JP Saxe; Solon Holt
June 8	Atlanta	United States	State Farm Arena	JP Saxe; Solon Holt
June 9	Atlanta	United States	State Farm Arena	JP Saxe; Solon Holt
June 12	Louisville	United States	KFC Yum! Center	JP Saxe; Solon Holt
June 13	St. Louis	United States	Enterprise Center	JP Saxe; Solon Holt
June 16	Pittsburgh	United States	PPG Paints Arena	JP Saxe; Solon Holt
June 18 (Note: This show is part of Summerfest.)	Milwaukee	United States	Henry Maier Festival Park	JP Saxe; Solon Holt
June 19	Grand Rapids	United States	Van Andel Arena	JP Saxe; Solon Holt
June 20	Toronto	Canada	Scotiabank Arena	JP Saxe; Solon Holt
July 6	Boston	United States	TD Garden	JP Saxe; Solon Holt
July 7	Boston	United States	TD Garden	JP Saxe; Solon Holt
July 9	Brooklyn	United States	Barclays Center	JP Saxe; Solon Holt
July 10	Newark	United States	Prudential Center	JP Saxe; Solon Holt
July 11	Philadelphia	United States	Xfinity Mobile Arena	JP Saxe; Solon Holt
July 14	Charlotte	United States	Spectrum Center	JP Saxe; Solon Holt
July 16	Orlando	United States	Kia Center	JP Saxe; Solon Holt
July 17	Tampa	United States	Benchmark International Arena	JP Saxe; Solon Holt
July 18	Sunrise	United States	Amerant Bank Arena	JP Saxe; Solon Holt
July 24 (Note: This show is part of the Great Jones County Fair.)	Monticello	United States	Great Jones County Fairgrounds	Colin Lynch
July 25	Minneapolis	United States	Target Center	JP Saxe; Solon Holt
July 26	Lincoln	United States	Pinnacle Bank Arena	JP Saxe; Solon Holt
August 1	Portland	United States	Moda Center	JP Saxe; Solon Holt
August 2	Seattle	United States	Climate Pledge Arena	JP Saxe; Solon Holt
August 5	Sacramento	United States	Golden 1 Center	JP Saxe; Solon Holt
August 7	Los Angeles	United States	Crypto.com Arena	JP Saxe; Solon Holt
August 8	Los Angeles	United States	Crypto.com Arena	JP Saxe; Solon Holt
August 11	Glendale	United States	Desert Diamond Arena	JP Saxe; Solon Holt
August 14	Dallas	United States	American Airlines Center	JP Saxe; Solon Holt
August 15	Tulsa	United States	BOK Center	JP Saxe; Solon Holt
August 16	Kansas City	United States	T-Mobile Center	JP Saxe; Solon Holt
August 18	Detroit	United States	Little Caesars Arena	JP Saxe; Solon Holt
August 21	Nashville	United States	Bridgestone Arena	JP Saxe; Solon Holt
August 22	Nashville	United States	Bridgestone Arena	JP Saxe; Solon Holt
August 27 (Note: The show in Denver was originally scheduled for July 28, but was rescheduled to August 27 due to illness.)	Denver	United States	Ball Arena	JP Saxe; Solon Holt
September 13	Oslo	Norway	Sentrum Scene	Colin Lynch
September 15	Stockholm	Sweden	Cirkus	Colin Lynch
September 18	Cologne	Germany	Carlswerk Victoria	Colin Lynch
September 19	Tilburg	Netherlands	013 Poppodium	Colin Lynch
September 21	Paris	France	Le Trianon	Colin Lynch
September 23	London	England	Eventim Apollo	Colin Lynch
September 26	Manchester	England	O2 Apollo Manchester	Laci Kaye Booth
September 27	Glasgow	Scotland	O2 Academy Glasgow	Colin Lynch
September 28	Glasgow	Scotland	O2 Academy Glasgow	Colin Lynch
October 1	Belfast	Northern Ireland	The O2 Belfast	Colin Lynch

List of 2027 concerts
Date (2027)	City	Country	Venue	Opening acts
May 8	Melbourne	Australia	Rod Laver Arena	Laci Kaye Booth; Colin Lynch
May 11	Sydney	Australia	Afterpay Arena	Laci Kaye Booth; Colin Lynch
May 14	Brisbane	Australia	Brisbane Entertainment Centre	Laci Kaye Booth; Colin Lynch
May 15	Brisbane	Australia	Brisbane Entertainment Centre	Laci Kaye Booth; Colin Lynch
