= 48th Academy of Country Music Awards =

US music awards ceremony in 2013

- Date: April 7, 2013
- Location: MGM Grand Garden Arena, Las Vegas, Nevada
- Hosted by: Luke Bryan; Blake Shelton

Highlights
- Most wins: Miranda Lambert (3)
- Most nominations: Eric Church (6)

Television/radio coverage
- Network: CBS

The 48th Academy of Country Music Awards were held on April 7, 2013, at the MGM Grand Garden Arena, Las Vegas, Nevada. The ceremony was hosted by Luke Bryan and Blake Shelton.

== Winners and nominees ==
Winners are shown in bold.

Entertainer of the Year (Note: From 2008 to 2015, 'Entertainer of the Year' was decided by a combination of ACM professional membership and fan votes cast online and via text message.)	Album of the Year
**Luke Bryan**; Jason Aldean; Miranda Lambert; Blake Shelton; Taylor Swift	**Chief** — **Eric Church**; Blown Away — Carrie Underwood; Red — Taylor Swift; Tailgates & Tanlines — Luke Bryan; Tornado — Little Big Town
Female Artist of the Year	Male Artist of the Year
**Miranda Lambert**; Martina McBride; Kacey Musgraves; Taylor Swift; Carrie Underwood	**Jason Aldean**; Luke Bryan; Eric Church; Toby Keith; Blake Shelton
Vocal Group of the Year	Vocal Duo of the Year
**Little Big Town**; Lady Antebellum; The Band Perry; Eli Young Band; Zac Brown Band	**Thompson Square**; Big & Rich; Florida Georgia Line; Love and Theft; Sugarland
Single of the Year	Song of the Year
**"Over You"** — **Miranda Lambert**; "Springsteen" — Eric Church; "Even If It Breaks Your Heart" — Eli Young Band; "Wanted" — Hunter Hayes; "Pontoon" — Little Big Town	**"Over You"** — **Miranda Lambert, Blake Shelton**; "A Woman Like You" — Phil Barton, Johnny Bulford, Jon Stone; "Even If It Breaks Your Heart" — Will Hoge, Eric Paslay; "Springsteen" — Eric Church, Jeff Hyde, Ryan Tyndell; "Wanted" — Hunter Hayes, Troy Verges
Best New Artist of the Year	Video of the Year
**Florida Georgia Line**; Brantley Gilbert; Jana Kramer	**"Tornado"** — **Little Big Town**; "Creepin’" — Eric Church; "Wanted" — Hunter Hayes; "Merry Go ‘Round" — Kacey Musgraves; "We Are Never Ever Getting Back Together" — Taylor Swift; "The Wind" — Zac Brown Band
Vocal Event of the Year
**"The Only Way I Know"** — **Jason Aldean, Luke Bryan, and Eric Church**; "Don't Rush" — Kelly Clarkson and Vince Gill; "Easy" — Rascal Flatts and Natasha Bedingfield; "Feel Like A Rock Star" — Kenny Chesney and Tim McGraw; "Let It Rain" — David Nail and Sarah Buxton
