= Evangeline vs. the Machine =

Studio album by Eric Church
- Released: May 2, 2025
- Recorded: 2024–2025
- Studio: Neon Cross Studio (Nashville)
- Genre: Country
- Length: 36:00
- Label: EMI Nashville
- Producer: Jay Joyce

Eric Church chronology
Heart & Soul (2021)	Evangeline vs. the Machine (2025)

Singles from Evangeline vs. the Machine
- 1. "Hands of Time" Released: March 20, 2025

Evangeline vs. the Machine is the eighth studio album by American country music singer Eric Church. Released on May 2, 2025, the album was preceded by the single "Hands of Time" released on March 20, 2025.

"Clap Hands" was originally written and recorded by Tom Waits off his 1985 album, Rain Dogs.

== Background and promotion ==
Following the release of Church's triple album, Heart & Soul, Church took a hiatus from making music, having one of his only mainstream appearances following the album being his feature on Morgan Wallen's "Man Made a Bar" which topped the Country Airplay charts and peaked at 15 on the Billboard Hot 100. In October 2024, Church released a promotional single entitled "Darkest Hour (Helene Edit)", his first solo performance in three years. He had already written the song before Hurricane Helene and intended to release it in 2025, but because the lyrics fit with the serious damage the storm caused to his home state of North Carolina, and the efforts to help, Church said it "didn't feel right to wait with this song." Church helped directly with the recovery and promised all publishing royalties would go to help the state. Church and Luke Combs put together the "Concert for Carolina" on October 26, 2024, at Bank of America Stadium in Charlotte, North Carolina, which raised over $24 million for Hurricane Helene relief. Church performed the song at the 58th Annual Country Music Association Awards.

On March 17, 2025, Church announced via his social media that he would release the first single from his upcoming eighth studio album, "Hands of Time" on March 20, 2025. Shortly before the song's release, both the song and the album leaked on Apple Music, allowing listeners to listen to the song a few hours early, while also revealing the full tracklist and the title, Evangeline vs. The Machine. Church then took to his social media acknowledging the leak and revealing the release date, saying, "News escaped from the machine earlier today, but we're proud to announce the single "Hands of Time" is out now, and the new album Evangeline vs. The Machine will be releasing on 5.2.25." Church's shortest album to date, containing eight songs in total, contains the original cut of "Darkest Hour" along with the previously released "Hands of Time."

Church appeared on the Today show and talked about the album, saying about the album release:

"In the day we live in now, with all the social media... you can release a song on Tuesday, another song on Friday, another song on Tuesday," explained Church in the feature. "I'm an album artist, always have been, and I think we've gotten away from that now. The 'machine' is consumption; the 'machine' is the world we live in - and the interesting thing about 'Evangeline' is it's kind of creativity versus the machine, and 'Evangeline' represents that creativity."

On April 29, 2025, Church teased the second track from the album, "Bleed on Paper", across his social media. The next day, on April 30, Church announced his upcoming "Free the Machine" tour. The album was released on May 2, 2025.

On October 17, 2025, Church announced a live version of the album, Evangeline vs. the Machine: Comes Alive, would be released on February 13, 2026. The album contains 19 tracks and was recorded across two nights during shows at The Pinnacle in Nashville.

== Track listing ==
Evangeline vs. the Machine track listing
No.	Title	Writer(s)	Length
1.	"Hands of Time"	Eric Church; Scooter Carusoe	3:32
2.	"Bleed on Paper"	Casey Beathard; Tucker Beathard; Monty Criswell	5:39
3.	"Johnny"	Church; Luke Laird; Brett Warren	5:03
4.	"Storm in Their Blood"	Church	3:30
5.	"Darkest Hour"	Church	5:48
6.	"Evangeline"	Church; Barry Dean; Laird	4:40
7.	"Rocket's White Lincoln"	Church	4:03
8.	"Clap Hands"	Tom Waits	3:45
Total length:			36:00

Evangeline vs. the Machine: Comes Alive track listing
No.	Title	Writer(s)	Length
1.	"Hands of Time"	Church; Carusoe	3:53
2.	"Bleed on Paper"	C. Beathard; T. Beathard; Criswell	5:47
3.	"Johnny"	Church; Laird; Warren	4:45
4.	"Storm in Their Blood"	Church	3:52
5.	"Darkest Hour"	Church	5:27
6.	"Evangeline"	Church; Dean; Laird	4:35
7.	"Rocket's White Lincoln"	Church	4:33
8.	"Clap Hands"	Waits	3:59
9.	"Desperate Man"	Church; Ray Wylie Hubbard	4:52
10.	"Give Me Back My Hometown"	Church; Laird	4:38
11.	"Homeboy"	Church; C. Beathard	5:04
12.	"Sinners Like Me"	Church; Jeremy Spillman	4:05
13.	"Creepin' "	Church; Marv Green	4:58
14.	"Knives of New Orleans"	Church; Travis Meadows; Spillman	5:15
15.	"Smoke a Little Smoke"	Church; Jeff Hyde; Driver Williams	4:57
16.	"The Outsiders"	Church; C. Beathard	4:54
17.	"Hell of a View"	Church; C. Beathard; Criswell	2:51
18.	"Mistress Named Music"	Church; C. Beathard	7:14
19.	"Springsteen"	Church; Hyde; Ryan Tydnell	7:10
Total length:			92:58

== Personnel ==
=== Musicians ===
- Eric Church – vocals (all tracks), acoustic guitar (tracks 2–8)
- Jay Joyce – acoustic guitar, choir arrangement, electric guitar, keyboards, programming (all tracks); percussion (1, 3, 4, 6–8), bass (1, 3, 4, 7), synth bass (2, 5, 6, 8), drums (4, 5, 7); handclaps, timpani (8)
- April Rucker – choir vocals
- Armand Hutton – choir vocals
- Jeremy Lister – choir vocals
- Kristen Rogers – choir vocals
- Roy Agee – trombone
- Joanna Cotten – background vocals (tracks 1, 2, 4–6, 8)
- Rob McNelley – electric guitar (tracks 1, 5, 6, 8), acoustic guitar (2, 6, 8)
- Mike Haynes – trumpet (tracks 1, 2, 5, 6, 8)
- Todd Lombardo – acoustic guitar, mandolin (track 1)
- Luke Laird – acoustic guitar (track 1)
- Craig Wright – drums (track 1)
- Austin Hoke – cello (tracks 2–8)
- Bryan Sutton – acoustic guitar (tracks 2–5)
- Billy Justineau – choir vocals (tracks 2–8), Hammond B3 organ (3, 4), piano (4, 6), handclaps (8)
- Jessica Nolan – choir vocals (tracks 2–8)
- Maureen Murphy – choir vocals (tracks 2–8)
- Moiba Mustapha – choir vocals (tracks 2–8)
- Evan Cobb – saxophone (tracks 2–8), flute (5)
- Eleonore Denig – violin (tracks 2–8)
- Beth Beeson – French horn (tracks 2–6, 8)
- Sam Bacco – percussion (tracks 2–6, 8)
- Avery Bright – viola (tracks 2–6, 8)
- Kristin Weber – violin (tracks 2, 5, 6, 8)
- Laura Epling – violin (tracks 3, 4)
- Emmanuel Echem – trumpet (tracks 3, 4)

=== Technical ===
- Jay Joyce – production, mixing
- Jason Hall – mixing, engineering
- Andrew Mendelson – mastering
- Jimmy Mansfield – immersive mixing, immersive mastering, recording, engineering assistance
- Bobby Louden – recording, engineering assistance
- Court Blankenship – production coordination

== Charts ==
Chart performance for Evangeline vs. the Machine
Chart (2025)	Peak position
Scottish Albums (Official Charts)	88
UK Album Downloads (Official Charts)	33
UK Country Albums (Official Charts)	1
US Billboard 200	30
US Top Country Albums (Billboard)	5
