= Medicine (Megan Moroney song) =

2026 single by Megan Moroney

Single by Megan Moroney

from the album Cloud 9
- B-side: "Wedding Dress"
- Released: April 20, 2026
- Genre: Country pop
- Length: 3:11
- Label: Sony; Columbia
- Songwriters: Megan Moroney; Connie Harrington; Jessie Jo Dillon; Jessi Alexander
- Producer: Kristian Bush

Megan Moroney singles chronology
"Beautiful Things" (2025)	"Medicine" (2026)

"Medicine" is a song by American country music singer Megan Moroney. It was released on April 20, 2026, as the third single from her third studio album, Cloud 9. Moroney co-wrote the song with Connie Harrington, Jessie Jo Dillon, and Jessi Alexander, and it was produced by Kristian Bush.

== Background ==
In an interview on The Highway, Megan Moroney stated that she had originally planned to base her third album around the song and title the album Medicine, but later changed the title to Cloud 9.

== Composition ==
The song has been described as a blend of Megan Moroney's "classic emo cowgirl rock" and country pop. It is composed of snare drums, piano and a guitar break, which alternates between electric and steel guitar. The lyrics find Moroney addressing an unfaithful boyfriend, who has not contacted her for three days and been flirting with other women. She retaliates by giving her number to another man, a football quarterback, and dancing with him. The chorus plays on the phrase "taste of your own medicine", with her mockingly asking her ex-boyfriend about his feelings as he experiences the same treatment he has inflicted on her. The concept is continued in the next verse. Later, she expresses that his attempts to reconcile cannot make up for him repeatedly hurting her feelings in the past.

== Critical reception ==
Ross Jones of Holler praised the sarcasm in the song, considering it charming, as well as the guitar solo, which he wrote "tops off the track and might just make it one of the album's best." Piper Westrom of Riff described the song as "playful and sharp — the kind of track built for dance floors." Jacob Brookman of Stereoboard compared the song to "6 Months Later" and remarked it "bottles that same cartoon vengeance, serving revenge chilled and radio-ready. It's wicked without tipping into cruelty — Tammy Wynette in the group chat."

== Live performances ==
Megan Moroney performed the song on The Tonight Show Starring Jimmy Fallon on March 4, 2026.

== Charts ==
Chart performance for "Medicine"
Chart (2026)	Peak position
Canada Hot 100 (Billboard)	51
Canada Country (Billboard)	21
New Zealand Hot Singles (RMNZ)	24
US Billboard Hot 100	39
US Country Airplay (Billboard)	14
US Hot Country Songs (Billboard)	11
