= Even the River Runs =

Studio album by Joel Crouse
- Released: August 19, 2014
- Genre: Country
- Length: 37:34
- Label: Show Dog-Universal Music
- Producer: Jason Nivens, Jamie Houston

Even the River Runs is the debut studio album by American country music artist Joel Crouse. It was released on August 19, 2014 via Show Dog-Universal Music. The album includes the singles "If You Want Some", "Why God Made Love Songs" and "Don't Tell Me".

== Track listing ==
No.	Title	Writer(s)	Length
1.	"Don't Tell Me"	Joel Crouse, James Dean Hicks, Jamie Houston	3:48
2.	"If You Want Some"	Crouse, Houston, Luke Laird	3:17
3.	"You Could Break a Heart Like That"	Crouse, Tim Johnson, Houston	4:05
4.	"Summer Love"	Crouse, Hicks, Houston	4:02
5.	"Even the River Runs"	Crouse, Houston, Craig Wiseman	3:50
6.	"Slow Motion"	Crouse, Johnson, Houston	3:56
7.	"Oh Juliet"	Crouse, Marcus Hummon, Houston	3:46
8.	"Ruby Puts Her Red Dress On"	Crouse, Wayne Kirkpatrick, Houston	3:55
9.	"Why God Made Love Songs"	Crouse, Jimmy Yeary, Houston	3:32
10.	"I Never Said I Was in Love"	Crouse, Johnson, Houston	3:23

== Chart performance ==
Chart (2014)	Peak position
US Top Country Albums (Billboard)	20
US Billboard 200	183
