= Darkest Hour (Eric Church song) =

- Helene Edit cover

Single by Eric Church

from the album Evangeline vs. the Machine
- Released: October 4, 2024 (Helene Edit); May 2, 2025 (Album Cut)
- Recorded: August 22, 2024
- Genre: Country
- Length: 4:07 (Helene Edit); 5:48 (Album Cut)
- Label: EMI Records
- Songwriter: Eric Church
- Producer: Jay Joyce

Eric Church singles chronology
"Doing Life with Me" (2022)	"Darkest Hour" (2024)	"Hands of Time" (2025)

"Darkest Hour" is a single by American country music singer Eric Church. Originally released on October 4, 2024, titled "Darkest Hour (Helene Edit)", the song was released to radio as a single to promote relief for damage from Hurricane Helene. The original cut of the song was released on May 2, 2025, as the fifth track from his eighth studio album, Evangeline vs. the Machine.

== Lyrics and composition ==
The song, written solely by Church, contains the notion of "offering a hand to anyone who needs help". "Darkest Hour" opens with Church speaking to the listener telling that if they were "down in a gutter, trying to shake off the snow" or if their "tide was low, and they lost their rudder" he would show them where to go. The chorus tells that even in the listeners' "darkest hour", he would be there to help: "In your darkest hour / Baby I'd come runnin' / In your darkest hour / I'd light your way / Baby don't give up / I'd do everything in my power to take even a minute off of your darkest hour". The second verse says that life can be a "maze of moments" and says: "When it all goes south / I'll be your compass / Till your needle spins you north again".

== Helene edit ==
In October 2024, Church released a promotional single entitled "Darkest Hour (Helene Edit)", his first solo performance in three years. He had already written the song before Hurricane Helene and intended to release it in 2025, but because the lyrics fit with the serious damage the storm caused to his home state of North Carolina, and the efforts to help, Church said it "didn't feel right to wait with this song." Church helped directly with the recovery and promised all publishing royalties would go to help the state. Church and Luke Combs put together the "Concert for Carolina" on October 26, 2024, at Bank of America Stadium in Charlotte, North Carolina, which raised over $24 million for Hurricane Helene relief. Church performed the song at the 58th Annual Country Music Association Awards. The song charted on several US Billboard charts including peaking at number 21 on the Bubbling Under Hot 100 chart.

== Charts ==
Chart performance for "Darkest Hour (Helene Edit)"
Chart (2025)	Peak position
US Bubbling Under Hot 100 (Billboard)	21
US Country Airplay (Billboard)	25
US Hot Country Songs (Billboard)	38
