= Hands of Time (song) =

2025 single by Eric Church

Single by Eric Church

from the album Evangeline vs. the Machine
- Released: March 20, 2025
- Studio: Neon Cross Studio (Nashville, Tennessee)
- Genre: Country
- Length: 3:32
- Label: EMI Nashville
- Songwriters: Eric Church; Scooter Carusoe
- Producer: Jay Joyce

Eric Church singles chronology
"Darkest Hour (Helene Edit)" (2024)	"Hands of Time" (2025)	"McArthur" (2026)

Music video
- "Hands of Time" on YouTube

"Hands of Time" is a song by American country music singer Eric Church, released on March 20, 2025, as the lead single from his eighth studio album Evangeline vs. the Machine (2025). It was written by Church and Scooter Carusoe and produced by Jay Joyce.

== Background ==
In an Instagram video, Eric Church said:

"Hands of Time" is interesting because as I get older, I'm looking for things that make me feel not as old. And for "Hands of Time," I really can honestly say that when I hear music or a movie or something, those things, when I see something from my past, I feel like I did then. I relate to what it was then. And there's a line in the song, "How do you handle the hands of time?" I really believe that a good way to handle that is with music with Seger and with "Hollywood Nights" and every line of the song. But I think that that's a way I handle it. I think it was an interesting concept from a writing standpoint, to come in and handle it that way. I think it's pretty good advice for people as they age to find things that make them feel younger, and that's what this song is all about.

Church announced the release of the song on March 17, 2025. The song was scheduled to be released at midnight on March 20, but leaked before the date.

== Composition ==
"Hands of Time" is a country song that blends southern rock and blues. It contains gospel elements from the backup vocals, while the production consists of electric guitar, horn stabs and sound effects of clocks ticking. Lyrically, the song is about listening to music to feel younger as one is aging. Eric Church shouts to numerous songs serving as his influences, including "Hollywood Nights" by Bob Seger, "Even the Losers" by Tom Petty and the Heartbreakers, "Paradise by the Dashboard Light" by Meat Loaf, "Back in Black" and "You Shook Me All Night Long" by AC/DC, "Could You Be Loved" and "Redemption Song" by Bob Marley and the Wailers, "Luckenbach, Texas (Back to the Basics of Love)" by Waylon Jennings, "Amazing Grace" and "Sunday Morning Coming Down".

== Music video ==
The music video for "Hands of Time" premiered on May 2, 2025.

== Personnel ==
As listed in album credits

- Eric Church – lead vocals
- Jay Joyce – programming, percussion, bass, acoustic guitar, electric guitar, keys
- Todd Lombardo – acoustic guitar, mandolin
- Rob McNelley – electric guitar
- Craig Wright – drums
- Luke Laird – guitar
- Joanna Cotten – background vocals

Horns

- Roy Agee – trombone
- Mike Haynes – trumpet

Choir

- Kristen Rogers
- April Rucker
- Jeremy Lister
- Armand Hutton

== Charts ==
=== Weekly charts ===
Weekly chart performance for "Hands of Time"
Chart (2025)	Peak position
Canada Hot 100 (Billboard)	96
Canada Country (Billboard)	7
UK Country Airplay (Radiomonitor)	1
US Billboard Hot 100	70
US Country Airplay (Billboard)	14
US Hot Country Songs (Billboard)	20

=== Year-end charts ===
Year-end chart performance for "Hands of Time"
Chart (2025)	Position
US Country Airplay (Billboard)	44
US Hot Country Songs (Billboard)	48
