= Drink in My Hand =

Single by Eric Church

from the album Chief
- Released: August 15, 2011
- Recorded: 2011
- Genre: Country rock
- Length: 3:11
- Label: EMI Nashville
- Songwriters: Eric Church; Michael P. Heeney; Luke Laird
- Producer: Jay Joyce

Eric Church singles chronology
"Homeboy" (2011)	"Drink in My Hand" (2011)	"Springsteen" (2012)

"Drink in My Hand" is a song co-written and recorded by American country music artist Eric Church. It was released in August 2011 as the second single from his 2011 album Chief. The song became Church's first number one hit on the US Billboard Hot Country Songs chart. Church wrote this song with Michael P. Heeney and Luke Laird.

== Content ==
"Drink in My Hand" is an up-tempo where the male narrator sings about drinking alcohol to forget his problems, suggesting that "All you gotta do is put a drink in [his] hand."

== Critical reception ==
Billy Dukes of Taste of Country gave the song four and a half stars out of five, writing that it is "rowdy and fun" and "should easily become the most successful song of the singer’s three album career." Matt Bjorke of Roughstock gave the song four and a half stars of five, calling it "downright perfect as the theme song to a fun weekend" and adding that it "truly feels like a monster hit." Dan Milliken, reviewing the song for Country Universe, gave it a B−, saying that it is "just a radio hit [with] no higher aspiration than to be a slightly cooler version of 'All About Tonight'."

== Music video ==
The music video was directed by Peter Zavadil and premiered in September 2011. It shows Eric at a concert, as well as various close-ups. It was filmed using a grainy-style technique, so the video is fast and somewhat blurry.

== Commercial performance ==
"Drink in My Hand" debuted at number 57 on the U.S. Billboard Hot Country Songs chart for the week of August 27, 2011. As of April 2014, the song has sold 1,191,000 digital copies in the US and was certified 5× platinum by the RIAA on October 30, 2024.

== Charts ==
=== Weekly charts ===
Chart (2011–2012)	Peak position
Canada Country (Billboard)	1
Canada Hot 100 (Billboard)	52
US Hot Country Songs (Billboard)	1
US Billboard Hot 100	40

=== Year-end charts ===
Chart (2011)	Position
US Country Songs (Billboard)	73

Chart (2012)	Position
US Country Songs (Billboard)	44

== Certifications ==
Region	Certification	Certified units/sales
Canada (Music Canada)	Platinum	80,000^{*}
United States (RIAA)	5× Platinum	1,191,000
^{*} Sales figures based on certification alone.
