= Beulah (singer) =

British singer-songwriter

Beulah (born Beulah Garside in 1982 or 1983) is an English female singer-songwriter and record producer. She grew up in the Peak District and attended Repton School. This country setting and her family gave her the inspiration for her debut album, Mabel and I. The album is a mixture of folksy ballads, jazz and country.

She is from Manchester, England. Her career has spanned 15 years and has taken her from the United Kingdom to the United States, Brazil and Japan. In her early years Beulah worked with Gary Barlow and Eliot Kennedy. At the age of 22 she moved to London and met Jon Kelly, and they, along with Universal Records, made her debut album Mabel & I. However, she spent most of her career in the United States, namely Nashville and Los Angeles, working alongside Grammy Award-winning writer/producer David Foster and songwriter Sarah Siskind. She also sang with Andrea Bocelli.

She has written with many other writers such as Crispin Hunt, Steve Booker and Amy Foster. She is currently working alongside BAFTA- and Oscar-winning executive producer, Maggie Monteith, among others, as she enjoys her move into film and television.

== Discography ==
Mabel and I was released on 6 June 2005 via Universal Classic and Jazz. The first and most well-known single from the album, "Stay", was released on 13 February 2006 and is used on many compilation albums. The album included:

https://open.spotify.com/artist/7JgsSijn01ytQ39BNwmmK0?si=bbJu4TU-R6SopEuxbgh4cQ

1. "Stay"
2. "I Can't Wait"
3. "Leaving Home"
4. "Mary"
5. "Sweet Kinda' Something"
6. "Never More"
7. "Circus"
8. "Miss Me No More"
9. "Lazy Days"
10. "You're Gone"
11. "Broken Seams"
12. "Mabel and I"

Beulah released her second studio album, Hollow in 2020. https://open.spotify.com/artist/7JgsSijn01ytQ39BNwmmK0?si=bbJu4TU-R6SopEuxbgh4cQ

1. "Seriously"
2. "Unravelling"
3. "Wasted"
4. "Wanted"
5. "Hollow"
6. "Vampire"
7. "Moon"
8. "Space"
9. "River"
10. "Safe"

Dance Music is an extended play.

1. "Burning"
2. "Signs"
3. "Roller"
4. "Superluminal"
