= Beautiful Things (Megan Moroney song) =

2025 single by Megan Moroney

Single by Megan Moroney

from the album Cloud 9
- Released: October 27, 2025
- Genre: Country
- Length: 3:55
- Label: Sony
- Songwriters: Megan Moroney; Jessi Alexander; Jessie Jo Dillon; Connie Harrington
- Producer: Kristian Bush

Megan Moroney singles chronology
"6 Months Later" (2025)	"Beautiful Things" (2025)	"Medicine" (2026)

"Beautiful Things" is a song by American country music singer Megan Moroney. It was released to country radio on October 27, 2025, as the second single from Moroney's third album, Cloud 9. It was written by Moroney, Jessi Alexander, Jessie Jo Dillon, and Connie Harrington, and produced by Kristian Bush. The song was nominated for Best Country Song at the 69th Annual Grammy Awards, becoming Moroney's first song to be nominated by the Recording Academy.

== Background ==
Moroney co-wrote the song with Jessi Alexander, Jessie Jo Dillon, and Connie Harrington, the latter of which came up with the subject idea. Moroney referred to the song as the "older sister" of "Girl in the Mirror", a track from her debut album, Lucky, saying: "I wish I had this song in high school."

Prior to its release, she performed the song live for the first time in March 2025 at the Bluebird Café in Nashville, before adding it to the setlist of her Am I Okay? Tour.

== Content ==
A ballad, Moroney wrote the song about her young niece: "When she was born I remember being in awe of how sweet and perfect she was. & I (in true emo cowgirl fashion) was sad knowing that when she grows up the world may be cruel to her sometimes."

== Chart performance ==
"Beautiful Things" pulled in 68 station adds at the country format upon impact, and debuted at number 37 on the Billboard Country Airplay chart.

== Charts ==
Chart performance for "Beautiful Things"
Chart (2025–2026)	Peak position
Canada Hot 100 (Billboard)	65
Canada Country (Billboard)	3
New Zealand Hot Singles (RMNZ)	23
US Billboard Hot 100	32
US Country Airplay (Billboard)	4
US Hot Country Songs (Billboard)	8

== Certifications ==
Certifications for "Beautiful Things"
Region	Certification	Certified units/sales
United States (RIAA)	Gold	500,000^{‡}
^{‡} Sales+streaming figures based on certification alone.
