= Johnny (Eric Church song) =

Promotional single by Eric Church

from the album Evangeline vs. the Machine
- Released: September 12, 2025
- Recorded: 2024–2025
- Studio: Neon Cross Studio (Nashville, Tennessee)
- Genre: Country
- Length: 5:03 (album version); 4:20 (single edit)
- Label: EMI Nashville
- Songwriters: Eric Church; Luke Laird; Brett Warren
- Producer: Jay Joyce

"Johnny" is a song by American country music singer Eric Church. It was released on September 12, 2025, as a promotional single from his eighth studio album Evangeline vs. the Machine. Church co-wrote the song with Luke Laird and Brett Warren.

== History ==
Church debuted "Johnny" during the 2025 Country Radio Seminar (CSR) in Nashville, Tennessee. He performed the song on the Ryman Auditorium stage, initially with only an acoustic guitar before being joined by a gospel choir.

The song was written in the aftermath of the Nashville school shooting in March 2023 at The Covenant School, which occurred roughly a mile from the school attended by Church's two sons. Church described the difficulty of dropping off his children at school the following morning, calling it "the hardest thing I've ever done in my life, parent or otherwise." Sitting in the parking lot, he heard Charlie Daniels's "The Devil Went Down to Georgia" on the radio and reflected, "Man, we could use Johnny right now, because the Devil is not in Georgia. He is everywhere." He went home and wrote "Johnny" that same day.

The performance also drew from Church's personal history with mass shootings, as he had performed at the Route 91 Harvest in Las Vegas the night before the mass shooting that killed 60 people.

The studio version was released alongside his eighth album, Evangeline vs. the Machine, on May 2, 2025. In September 2025, Church issues a standalone promotional single edit, timed amid a series of widely publicized violent events in the United States.

== Critical reception ==
Critics praised "Johnny" as one of the most striking and ambitious songs of Church's career. Rolling Stone described it as "fire, brimstone, and, if we're lucky, salvation," noting its risk of veering into melodrama but crediting Church's delivery with grounding its emotional core. Other reviewers highlighted its "haunting portrait of our modern world" and its boldness in tackling politically sensitive themes without direct partisanship. Wide Open Country emphasized that while the premise could have fallen flat, Church's "weight and drama" lent the song thematic weight.

== Personnel ==
=== Musicians ===
- Eric Church – vocals, acoustic guitar
- Jay Joyce – acoustic guitar, choir arrangement, electric guitar, keyboards, programming, percussion, bass
- April Rucker – choir vocals
- Armand Hutton – choir vocals
- Jeremy Lister – choir vocals
- Kristen Rogers – choir vocals
- Roy Agee – trombone
- Austin Hoke – cello
- Bryan Sutton – acoustic guitar
- Billy Justineau – choir vocals, Hammond B3 organ
- Jessica Nolan – choir vocals
- Maureen Murphy – choir vocals
- Moiba Mustapha – choir vocals
- Evan Cobb – saxophone
- Eleonore Denig – violin
- Beth Beeson – French horn
- Sam Bacco – percussion
- Avery Bright – viola
- Laura Epling – violin
- Emmanuel Echem – trumpet

=== Technical ===
- Jay Joyce – production, mixing
- Jason Hall – mixing, engineering
- Andrew Mendelson – mastering
- Jimmy Mansfield – immersive mixing, immersive mastering, recording, engineering assistance
- Bobby Louden – recording, engineering assistance
- Court Blankenship – production coordination
