= If You Want Some =

Single by Joel Crouse

from the album Even the River Runs
- Released: February 4, 2013
- Genre: Country
- Length: 3:20
- Label: Show Dog-Universal Music
- Songwriter(s): Joel Crouse; Jamie Houston; Luke Laird
- Producer(s): Jamie Houston

Joel Crouse singles chronology
"If You Want Some" (2013)	"Why God Made Love Songs" (2014)

"If You Want Some" is a song recorded by American country music artist Joel Crouse. It was released in February 2013 as his debut single and the first from his album Even the River Runs. Crouse wrote the song with Jamie Houston and Luke Laird.

== Critical reception ==
Billy Dukes of Taste of Country gave the song three and a half stars out of five, writing that "it’s a worthwhile story that allows the singer to show some personality." Dukes thought that Crouse "sings with more confidence than 20 years provides most artists" and that the song is "cool enough to grab one’s attention, but not so cool that fans will ask 'What’s he trying to prove?'"

== Music video ==
The music video was directed by Chris Hicky and premiered on the Rolling Stone website in June 2013. It features Crouse and his band performing in front of a convenience store when their van breaks down.

== Chart performance ==
"If You Want Some" debuted at number 59 on the U.S. Billboard Country Airplay chart for the week of February 9, 2013. It also debuted at number 50 on the U.S. Billboard Hot Country Songs chart for the week of July 27, 2013.

Chart (2013)	Peak position
US Country Airplay (Billboard)	32
US Hot Country Songs (Billboard)	50
