= Joel Crouse =

American country music singer

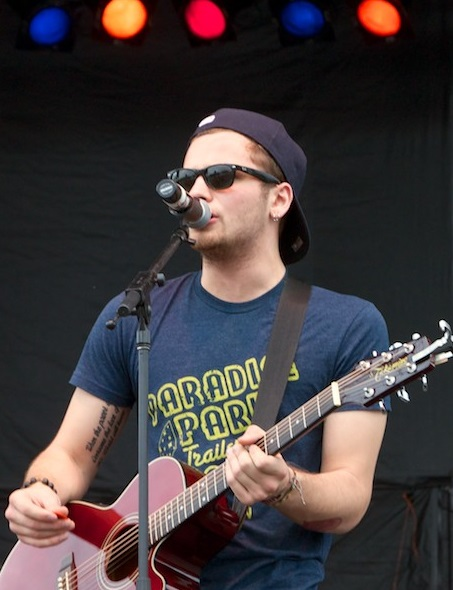
- Image of Joel Crouse at Countryfest 2013

Background information
- Born: Joel Thomas Crouse; June 14, 1992 (age 33); Holland, Massachusetts
- Genres: Country
- Occupation: Singer-songwriter musician
- Instrument: Vocals/guitar/piano
- Website: www.joelcrouse.com

Joel Thomas Crouse (born June 14, 1992) is an American country music singer and songwriter. He released his most recent EP, wasteLAnd on his label, Hum Records in August 2020.

== Early life ==
Joel Crouse grew up in Holland, Massachusetts. He attended Tantasqua Regional High School and graduated when he was sixteen.

== Career ==
While still living in Holland, Crouse founded a local pop rock band called Leaving Stafford. He signed a short-lived demo deal with Epic Records in 2009.

In 2011, Crouse signed with Show Dog-Universal Music, and toured with Toby Keith and The Band Perry. He released his debut single "If You Want Some" in February 2013. It received three-and-a-half stars from Taste of Country reviewer Billy Dukes, who thought that Crouse "sings with more confidence than 20 years provides most artists". The song, which he wrote with Jamie Houston and Luke Laird, debuted at number 59 on the Country Airplay charts in January 2013. His album, Even the River Runs, was released on August 19, 2014, and entered the Billboard Top Country Albums at No. 20. Crouse made his Grand Ole Opry debut on April 18, 2014.

From May to July 2013, he toured with Taylor Swift as a part of her Red Tour as one of her opening acts, playing before the other opening act, Ed Sheeran.

On July 10, 2020, Crouse released his first feature collaboration with German DJ Wave Wave, "Broke".

Crouse released "wasteLAnd" EP on his label, Hum Records, in August 2020. "On My Way" was the lead single co-written by Ed Sheeran and the Official Music Video features Darius Rucker, Ed Sheeran, and Lucy Hale. American Songwriter published an interview with Crouse about the EP, which "chronicles Crouse’s roller-coaster experience with the music business. [Crouse said] 'I had gone from touring with Taylor Swift and Ed Sheeran and Darius Rucker,' he says. 'Four years later, my business manager ends up going to jail. I ended up getting in this horrible deal that I had to fight my way out of. And at this time, I’m broke, too. I’m on food stamps, trying to survive. I end up going to write a song with Todd Clark and he was like, ‘What’s going on in your life?’ I told him, ‘Dude, I feel like I’m just surviving.’ That started everything. I just started writing everything that was going on around me.'”

In December 2020, Darius Rucker included Crouse in SPIN Magazine's The 35 Best Lesser-Known Artists of the Last 35 Years, Picked by 35 Well-Known Artists, saying "Joel Crouse has a sense of melody like no one I have been around. I think that comes from having such a unique voice, it’s so original."

== Discography ==
=== EPs ===
Title	EP Details
wasteLAnd	Released: August 7, 2020; Label: Hum Records; Format: Digital

=== Albums ===
Title	Album details	Peak chart positions		
Title	Album details	US Country	US	US Heat
Even the River Runs	Released: August 19, 2014; Label: Show Dog-Universal Music; Format: CD, digital download	20	183	3

=== Singles ===
Year	Single	Peak chart positions		Album
Year	Single	US Country	US Country Airplay	Album
2013	"If You Want Some"	50	32	Even the River Runs
2014	"Why God Made Love Songs"	-	53	Even the River Runs
2014	"Don't Tell Me"	-	-	Even the River Runs
"-" denotes releases that did not chart

=== Music Videos ===
Year	Video	Director
2013	"If You Want Some"	Chris Hicky
2020	"On My Way"	Robbie Norris
