= Homeboy (song) =

Single by Eric Church

from the album Chief
- Released: February 28, 2011
- Recorded: 2010
- Genre: Country rock; Southern rock; hard rock
- Length: 3:49
- Label: EMI Nashville
- Songwriters: Eric Church; Casey Beathard
- Producer: Jay Joyce

Eric Church singles chronology
"Smoke a Little Smoke" (2010)	"Homeboy" (2011)	"Drink in My Hand" (2011)

"Homeboy" is a song co-written and recorded by American country music artist Eric Church. It was released in February 2011 as the ninth single of his career and the first from his 2011 album Chief. The song reached the Top 20 on the U.S. Billboard Hot Country Songs chart with a peak at number 13. Church wrote this song with Casey Beathard about his son Tucker Beathard

== Content ==
In "Homeboy", the narrator addresses a delinquent brother who has taken to a destructive urban lifestyle. The lyrics play on the word "homeboy", turning it into a plea for his brother to "come on home, boy." Co-writer Casey Beathard came up with the song's idea after hearing his son say "come on, homeboy" to a friend. He made the song available as a free digital download from his website between February 20 and 24, 2011, although it was not available from retailers until March 8.

== Critical reception ==
Matt Bjorke of Roughstock rated the song four stars out of five, calling it "relatable on many levels" and praising the "interesting musical accompaniment". He thought that the "loud guitars are sure to turn off some people", but believed that the song would appeal to fans of Hank Williams, Jr. or Charlie Daniels. Stephen M. Deusner of Engine 145 gave it a "thumbs down", describing it as something "actively, even aggressively bad to the point of insulting, both culturally and musically." He thought that the song stereotyped the urban lifestyle and that the production "topple[d] over into self-parody".

== Music video ==
The music video was directed by Peter Zavadil and premiered in May 2011. It was filmed at the former Tennessee State Prison in Nashville, Tennessee, where Church also filmed the video for "Lightning", an album track from his first album. In the video, the brother character is shown being pursued by police officers, jailed, and then leaving jail while realizing the effects of his decisions.

== Chart performance ==
Chart (2011)	Peak position
Canada Country (Billboard)	34
US Hot Country Songs (Billboard)	13
US Billboard Hot 100	53

=== Year-end charts ===
Chart (2011)	Position
US Country Songs (Billboard)	52

== Certifications ==
Region	Certification	Certified units/sales
Canada (Music Canada)	Gold	40,000^{*}
United States (RIAA)	2× Platinum	2,000,000^{‡}
^{*} Sales figures based on certification alone.^{‡} Sales+streaming figures based on certification alone.
