= Cloud 9 (Megan Moroney album) =

2026 studio album by Megan Moroney

Studio album by Megan Moroney
- Released: February 20, 2026
- Recorded: 2025
- Genre: Country
- Length: 52:52
- Labels: Sony; Columbia
- Producers: Kristian Bush; Megan Moroney; Luke Laird

Megan Moroney chronology
Blue Christmas...Duh (2024)	Cloud 9 (2026)

Singles from Cloud 9
- 1. "6 Months Later" Released: June 20, 2025; 2. "Beautiful Things" Released: October 27, 2025; 3. "Medicine" Released: April 20, 2026

Cloud 9 is the third studio album by American country music singer Megan Moroney, released by Columbia Records through Sony on February 20, 2026. It debuted at number one on the US Top Country Albums chart and the US Billboard 200, making it her first number-one album on both charts. The album was nominated for Best Contemporary Country Album at the 69th Annual Grammy Awards, becoming her first album to be nominated by the Recording Academy. The album has been described as country with elements of pop, country pop, steel guitar synths, and country rock.

== Release and promotion ==
The album's lead single, "6 Months Later", was released on June 20, 2025. On October 14, Moroney announced "Beautiful Things", which was released as the second single on October 27. On November 9, she took to social media to post a teaser trailer for the album, opening a window from a blue backdrop of the Am I Okay? album cover fading into a pink color, with the instrumental of the album's title track playing in the background. On November 11, the album's release date and name were officially revealed and slated for February 20, 2026.

Moroney released "Wish I Didn't" as a promotional single on January 16, 2026 alongside a music video directed by Lauren Dunn based off the 2005 film Mr. & Mrs. Smith. Critics described the track as a country pop song that is "flirty, self-aware and packed with bite". On February 6, 2026 Moroney released the albums title track as the second promotional single. Both tracks would debut on the US Billboard Hot 100, peaking at number 41 and 63 respectively. One week after the release of the album, Moroney released "Sorry... I Meant Tonight" as a bonus track, which critics described as having a "pop-heavy production".

"Medicine" was sent to radio on April 20, 2026 as the album's third single. In an interview with The Highway, Moroney stated that she had originally planned to base her third album around the song and title the album Medicine, but decided against it, adding that the title Cloud 9 felt closer to the pink theme-color of her record. On May 15, 2026 Moroney released "Traitor (Roles Reversed)" digitally as bonus track.

== Commercial performance ==
Cloud 9 became her first No. 1 on the Billboard 200, debuting with 147,000 equivalent album units in the US for the week ending February 26, 2026. The album was the first country album by a female artist to reach number one on the chart since Beyoncé's album Cowboy Carter in 2024. Moroney's album debuted on several other Billboard charts, including No. 1 on the Top Country Albums chart and No. 2 on Top Streaming Albums chart with 71.54 million on-demand official streams. Cloud 9 became Moroney's biggest debut week in terms of sales. The albums lead single "6 Months Later" became Moroney's highest charting song on the US Billboard Hot 100 at number 29, alongside "Medicine" and "Beautiful Things" peaking inside the top 40. The albums three singles have all charted within the top 20 on the US Country Airplay chart, with "6 Months Later" reaching number two, tying "Am I Okay?" as her highest charting song on the format.

== Critical reception ==
Professional ratings
Aggregate scores
Source	Rating
Metacritic	73/100
Review scores
Source	Rating
AllMusic	4/5 stars
Paste	C
Pitchfork	6.7/10
Riff	9/10
Rolling Stone	3.5/5 stars
Stereoboard	3/5 stars

According to music review aggregator Metacritic, Cloud 9 received "generally favorable" reviews, earning an average score of 73 based off four reviews. Millan Verma of Pitchfork gave the album a score of 6.7 out of 10, noting that Moroney's songwriting on the album is "tight, [providing] humorously self-aware narratives and an embedded use of place". Verma added that the album "solidifies [Moroney] as a mainstream country star who hasn’t entirely submitted to the machine".

Jonathan Bernstein for Rolling Stone described Moroney as "gifted as ever at Nashville songcraft" writing that the album has a "newfound emotional complexity". He noted that Cloud 9 could transform Moroney from a rising star into a "plain old megastar", naming "Liars & Tigers & Bears", "Change of Heart", and "Bells & Whistles" (featuring Kacey Musgraves) as standout moments on the album. Bernstein gave the album 3.5/5 stars.

== Accolades ==
Awards and nominations for Cloud 9
Award	Year	Category	Result	Ref.
American Music Awards	2026	Favorite Country Album	Won	
Grammy Awards	2027	Best Contemporary Country Album	Pending	

== Track listing ==
All tracks are written by Megan Moroney, with additional co-writers noted.

Standard edition
No.	Title	Writer(s)	Producer(s)	Length
1.	"Cloud 9"	Luke Laird; Jessie Jo Dillon; Ernest Keith Smith	Kristian Bush	3:38
2.	"Medicine"	Connie Harrington; Dillon; Jessi Alexander	Bush	3:11
3.	"6 Months Later"	Ben Williams; Rob Hatch; David Mescon	Bush	3:03
4.	"Stupid"	Amy Allen; Mescon	Bush	3:25
5.	"Beautiful Things"	Harrington; Dillon; Alexander	Bush	3:56
6.	"Convincing"	Harrington; Dillon; Alexander	Bush	2:59
7.	"Liars & Tigers & Bears"	Laird; Dillon	Bush	3:49
8.	"I Only Miss You" (featuring Ed Sheeran)	Williams; Mackenzie Carpenter; Micah Carpenter; Sheeran	Bush	4:09
9.	"Wedding Dress"	Williams; Colin Healy	Moroney; Laird	3:51
10.	"Change of Heart"	Williams; Ma. Carpenter; Mi. Carpenter	Bush	2:56
11.	"Bells & Whistles" (featuring Kacey Musgraves)	Williams; Ma. Carpenter; Mi. Carpenter	Bush	2:58
12.	"Table for Two"	Williams; Ma. Carpenter; Mi. Carpenter	Moroney; Laird	4:08
13.	"Wish I Didn't"	Emily Weisband; Hillary Lindsey; Laird	Bush	3:31
14.	"Who Hurt You?"	Laird; Dillon	Bush	3:55
15.	"Waiting on the Rain"	Laird; Dillon	Bush	3:25
Total length:				52:52

Bonus track / Spotify reissue
No.	Title	Writer(s)	Producer(s)	Length
16.	"Sorry... I Meant Tonight"	Laird; Dillon	Bush	3:33
17.	"Traitor (Roles Reversed)"	Lindsey; Weisband; David Mescon	Moroney; Bush; Laird	3:30

Target bonus edition
No.	Title	Writer(s)	Producer(s)	Length
16.	"Traitor (Roles Reversed)"			3:30
17.	"I Bought a House"	Dillon; Mescon	Bush	3:06

== Personnel ==
Credits were adapted from Tidal.

=== Musicians ===
- Megan Moroney – lead vocals, background vocals (all tracks); whistles (11)
- Kristian Bush – acoustic guitar (1–10, 13), chimes (1), synthesizer (3, 9, 13), mandolin (6), electric guitar (7, 11), programming (11, 15)
- Brandon Bush – synthesizer (1–5, 7, 8, 10, 11, 13, 14), piano (1, 7), organ (2–4, 6, 14), percussion (2, 5), programming (3, 4, 7, 11, 14), electric piano (4, 6, 11, 13–15), Clavinet (4), strings (5, 15), Mellotron (7, 11, 13, 14), synth bass (13)
- Benji Shanks – electric guitar (1–8, 11, 13–15), acoustic guitar (1, 3, 10, 11), baritone guitar (6, 7, 14), slide guitar (10)
- Travis McNabb – drums (1–8, 10, 11, 13–15), percussion (1, 3, 4, 6)
- Ted Pecchio – bass (1–8, 10, 11, 13, 14), upright bass (15)
- Justin Schipper – steel guitar (1–6, 8–15), electric guitar (1, 4, 6, 10), slide guitar (3), acoustic guitar (14)
- Justin Niebank – programming (1–5, 7, 8, 10–15), acoustic guitar (13)
- Ed Sheeran – lead vocals (8)
- Luke Laird – acoustic guitar (9, 12, 15); electric guitar, synthesizer (9, 12); bass (9), programming (12)
- Shaun Richardson – acoustic guitar (9), mandolin (12)
- Miles McPherson – drums, percussion (9, 12)
- Eli Beaird – bass (9, 12)
- Nathan Keeterle – electric guitar (9, 12)
- Billy Justineau – synthesizer (9, 12)
- Alex Harp – vocals (10)
- Chip Beaver – vocals (10)
- Cindy Beaver – vocals (10)
- Mike "Frog" Griffith – vocals (10)
- Juli Griffith – vocals (10)
- Kelly Harkin – vocals (10)
- Natalie King – vocals (10)
- Kacey Musgraves – lead vocals (11)
- Hillary Lindsey – background vocals (13)
- Jamey Johnson – background vocals (15)
- Kristin Wilkinson – viola (15)
- Annaliese Kowert – violin (15)
- David Angell – violin (15)

=== Technical ===
- Kristian Bush – production (1–8, 10, 11, 13–15), additional production (9, 12)
- Luke Laird – production (9, 12), additional engineering (9, 12, 13)
- Megan Moroney – production (9, 12)
- Drew Bollman – engineering (1–8, 10, 11, 13–15), mixing (1–3, 5–12, 14, 15), additional engineering (12), vocal engineering (15)
- Mike Stankiewicz – engineering (9, 12)
- Luke Camoplieta – vocal engineering, additional engineering, digital editing
- Konrad Snyder – vocal engineering (11)
- Buckley Miller – vocal engineering, additional engineering (12)
- Chris Vanoverberghe – engineering assistance (1, 4, 6, 8–11)
- Austin Brown – engineering assistance (2, 3, 5, 7, 13–15)
- Justin Niebank – mixing (1–3, 5–12, 14, 15)
- Serban Ghenea – mixing (4)
- Bryce Bordone – mixing (4)
- Alex Ghenea – mixing (13)
- Nathan Dantzler – mastering (1–12, 14, 15)
- Randy Merrill – mastering (13)
- Harriston Tate – mastering assistance (1–12, 14, 15)
- Brian David Willis – digital editing (5)
- Brandon Bush – production management
- Mike "Frog" Griffith – production management

== Charts ==
Weekly chart performance
Chart (2026)	Peak position
Australian Albums (ARIA)	20
Australian Country Albums (ARIA)	2
Canadian Albums (Billboard)	4
Irish Albums (IRMA)	100
New Zealand Albums (RMNZ)	24
Scottish Albums (Official Charts)	7
UK Albums (Official Charts)	67
UK Country Albums (Official Charts)	1
US Billboard 200	1
US Top Country Albums (Billboard)	1

== Certifications ==
Certifications for Cloud 9
Region	Certification	Certified units/sales
United States (RIAA)	Gold	500,000^{‡}
^{‡} Sales+streaming figures based on certification alone.
