= Cloud 9 (Megan Moroney song) =

2026 song by Megan Moroney

Promotional single by Megan Moroney

from the album Cloud 9
- Released: February 6, 2026
- Genre: Country
- Length: 3:33
- Label: Sony; Columbia
- Songwriters: Megan Moroney; Luke Laird; Jessie Jo Dillon; Ernest Smith
- Producer: Kristian Bush

"Cloud 9" is a song by American country music singer Megan Moroney, released on February 6, 2026, as a promotional single from her third studio album of the same name. It was written by Moroney herself, Luke Laird, Jessie Jo Dillon and Ernest and produced by Kristian Bush.

== Composition ==
The song consists of steel guitar synths, and a steady backbeat. Lyrically, Megan Moroney centers on her euphoria from falling in love. In the opening verse, she depicts her happiness as rendering the frustrations of everyday life insignificant. Moroney continues to highlight that being beside her lover is the only thing that matters to her. The verses maintain a soft and delicate tone, while the chorus features layered instrumentation and a mid-tempo beat that mirrors her intense joy.

== Critical reception ==
Piper Westrom of Riff commented the song "plays with expectations", adding "It's her most straightforward love song to date, but it doesn't sacrifice personality for polish."

== Charts ==
Chart performance for "Cloud 9"
Chart (2026)	Peak position
Canada Hot 100 (Billboard)	77
New Zealand Hot Singles (RMNZ)	18
US Billboard Hot 100	63
US Hot Country Songs (Billboard)	21
