= Chief (album) =

Studio album by Eric Church
- Released: July 26, 2011
- Recorded: 2010–2011
- Studio: Tragedy Studios, Nashville, Tennessee
- Genre: Country; outlaw country; Southern rock
- Length: 39:39
- Label: EMI Nashville
- Producer: Jay Joyce

Eric Church chronology
Carolina (2009)	Chief (2011)	The Outsiders (2014)

Singles from Chief
- 1. "Homeboy" Released: February 28, 2011; 2. "Drink in My Hand" Released: August 15, 2011; 3. "Springsteen" Released: February 21, 2012; 4. "Creepin'" Released: July 16, 2012; 5. "Like Jesus Does" Released: January 28, 2013

Chief is the third studio album by American country music artist Eric Church. It was released on July 26, 2011, via EMI Nashville. The album produced five singles, including Church's first two number one hits on the US Billboard Hot Country Songs chart—"Drink in My Hand" and "Springsteen", as well as the Top 10 hits "Creepin'" and "Like Jesus Does" and the Top 20 "Homeboy". In November 2024, the album was certified four-times Platinum by the RIAA, for having shipped over 4,000,000 records. As of April 2017, the album has sold 1,957,700 copies in the United States.

The album received a nomination for Best Country Album at the 54th Grammy Awards and won Album of the Year at the CMA Awards and ACM Awards. In 2020, the album was ranked at 419 on Rolling Stone's 500 Greatest Albums of All Time list.

== Critical reception ==
Professional ratings
Aggregate scores
Source	Rating
Metacritic	77/100
Review scores
Source	Rating
AllMusic	5/5 stars
Engine 145	3/5 stars
Slant Magazine	3.5/5 stars

Upon its release, Chief received generally positive reviews from most music critics. At Metacritic, which assigns a normalized rating out of 100 to reviews from mainstream critics, the album received an average score of 77, based on 9 reviews, which indicates "generally favorable reviews".

AllMusic reviewer Thom Jurek gave it 5 stars out of 5, saying that it is "defiant, well-conceived, and more carefully executed than it sounds, with some excellent songs". In a review for Slant Magazine, critic Jonathan Keefe stated that "It just doesn't make a hell of a lot of sense to champion traditional country music while singing over hard-rock arrangements and occasionally Auto-Tuned vocal tracks. That's not to say he doesn't do a lot of things, particularly with his songwriting and with some risky production choices, awfully well here. Chief doesn't make him a country music Jesus, but it does back up a good deal of his braggadocio."

Rolling Stone placed the album at number 19 on its Best Albums of 2011 list.

== Commercial performance ==
The album debuted at number one on the US Billboard 200 and the Top Country Albums chart, selling 145,000 copies in its first week of release. In its second week, the album fell to number two on the Billboard 200 while still remaining at number one on the Top Country Albums chart. The album was certified Platinum by the Recording Industry Association of America (RIAA) on June 20, 2012, and triple platinum on August 31, 2016, for combined sales and streams of over three million units in the United States. As of August 2017, the album has sold 1,957,700 copies in the United States.

== Track listing ==
No.	Title	Writer(s)	Length
1.	"Creepin'"	Eric Church; Marv Green	3:52
2.	"Drink in My Hand"	Church; Michael P. Heeney; Luke Laird	3:11
3.	"Keep On"	Church; Ryan Tyndell	2:38
4.	"Like Jesus Does"	Casey Beathard; Monty Criswell	3:18
5.	"Hungover & Hard Up"	Church; Laird	2:53
6.	"Homeboy"	Church; Beathard	3:47
7.	"Country Music Jesus"	Church; Jeremy Spillman	3:52
8.	"Jack Daniels"	Church; Jeff Hyde; Lynn Hutton	5:04
9.	"Springsteen"	Church; Hyde; Tyndell	4:23
10.	"I'm Gettin' Stoned"	Church; Hyde; Beathard; Jeremy Crady	4:02
11.	"Over When It's Over"	Church; Laird	2:39
12.	"Lovin' Me Anyway" (bonus track download)	Church; Green	3:29

== Personnel ==
Adapted from AllMusic.

=== Musicians ===
- Stephanie Chapman – background vocals
- Eric Church – lead vocals, Dobro, acoustic guitar, electric guitar
- J. T. Corenflos – electric guitar
- Joanna Cotten – background vocals
- Shelly Fairchild – background vocals
- Steve Fishell – lap steel guitar, pedal steel guitar
- Jason Hall – background vocals
- Lee Hendricks – bass guitar
- Jedd Hughes – acoustic guitar, banjo, mandolin
- Jeff Hyde – acoustic guitar, banjo, background vocals
- Jay Joyce – acoustic guitar, electric guitar, 12-string guitar, Dobro, synthesizer
- Jaime King – background vocals
- Luke Laird – acoustic guitar
- Alfreda McCrary Lee – background vocals
- Beverly Ann McCrary – background vocals
- Regina McCrary – background vocals
- Pat McLaughlin – acoustic guitar, electric guitar, background vocals
- Giles Reaves – vibraphone
- Jonathan Singleton – background vocals
- Bryan Sutton – acoustic guitar, banjo, mandolin
- Ryan Tyndell – background vocals
- Charlie Worsham – electric guitar, mandolin
- Craig Wright – drums, percussion

=== Technical ===
- Arturo Buenahora Jr. – executive production
- Joanna Carter – art direction
- Jason Hall – assistant, engineer
- Michelle Hall – art production
- Scott Johnson – production assistant
- Jay Joyce – production, engineer, mixing
- Andrew Mendelson – mastering
- John Peets – photography
- Matt Wheeler – assistant

== Charts ==
=== Weekly charts ===
Chart (2011–13)	Peak position
Australian Country Albums (ARIA)	13
Canadian Albums (Billboard)	7
UK Country Albums (OCC)	4
US Billboard 200	1
US Billboard Top Country Albums	1

=== Year-end charts ===
Chart (2011)	Position
US Billboard 200	66
US Top Country Albums (Billboard)	15
Chart (2012)	Position
US Billboard 200	23
US Top Country Albums (Billboard)	7
Chart (2013)	Position
US Billboard 200	47
US Top Country Albums (Billboard)	11
Chart (2017)	Position
US Top Country Albums (Billboard)	42
Chart (2018)	Position
US Top Country Albums (Billboard)	100
Chart (2019)	Position
US Top Country Albums (Billboard)	89

=== Decade-end charts ===
Chart (2010–2019)	Position
US Billboard 200	74
US Top Country Albums (Billboard)	10

== Certifications ==
Region	Certification	Certified units/sales
Canada (Music Canada)	Platinum	80,000^{^}
United States (RIAA)	4× Platinum	4,000,000^{‡} / 1,957,700
^{^} Shipments figures based on certification alone.
