= Wish I Didn't =

2026 song by Megan Moroney

- Moonlght remix cover art

Promotional single by Megan Moroney

from the album Cloud 9
- Released: January 16, 2026
- Genre: Country pop
- Length: 3:29
- Label: Sony
- Songwriters: Megan Moroney; Emily Weisband; Hillary Lindsey; Luke Laird
- Producer: Kristian Bush

Music video
- "Wish I Didn't" on YouTube

"Wish I Didn't" is a song by American country music singer Megan Moroney, released on January 16, 2026, as a promotional single from her third studio album, Cloud 9. It was written by Moroney herself, Emily Weisband, Hillary Lindsey and Luke Laird and produced by Kristian Bush.

== Background ==
Megan Moroney previewed the song on January 12, 2026, with a video of herself lip-syncing to the song. Fans speculated that the song was aimed at her rumored ex-boyfriend, fellow country singer Riley Green, based on the lyrics "It's all sunshine and blue skies / But I can also make it rain", which is believed to be a reference to Green's song "Make It Rain". In addition, Moroney dons her sunglasses during the line in question, possibly referencing a viral photo of Green in reflective sunglasses that appeared to show him on vacation with her.

== Composition ==
"Wish I Didn't" is a country pop song. It contains acoustic guitars, pop-inflected beats, and a "low hum of fuzzed electric guitar and synth". Lyrically, Megan Moroney sings about falling in love with a man of questionable character. She notes his troubled reputation and romantic past, admitting that he has charmed her but remaining cautious. Moroney warns him not to cross her and that she can expose him through her songs.

== Critical reception ==
Ross Jones of Holler called the song "an uptempo earworm reminiscent of Short n' Sweet era Sabrina Carpenter, and once again showcases Moroney's ear for a killer hook and her penchant for witty lyricism." James Daykin of Entertainment Focus remarked, "At its core, 'Wish I Didn't' is a playful but pointed warning shot aimed at a walking red flag. It is flirty, self-aware and packed with bite, balancing feel-good energy with Moroney's razor-sharp lyrical instincts. The song captures the emotional tug-of-war of catching feelings while knowing better, delivering a hook-heavy rush that feels built for windows-down singalongs and repeat listens." He additionally wrote that the song "surges with glossy momentum. Massive vocal stacks, driving rhythms and radiant guitars combine to create a high-octane country-pop track that feels both effortless and explosive, reinforcing Moroney's growing reputation as one of the genre's most replayable hitmakers."

== Music video ==
The music video was directed by Lauren Dunn and released alongside the song. Based on the 2005 film Mr. & Mrs. Smith, it stars Megan Moroney and Dylan Efron as a married couple. They appear to live blissfully in a house in the suburbs, but are revealed to have double lives as rival spies and assassins. The clip opens with a depiction of their morning routine; as Moroney makes breakfast for Efron, he slips spyware into her purse, before they leave for their respective jobs. As a spy, Moroney interrogates a potential criminal. She also runs into Efron at the hardware store, where they are shopping for tools for their profession. After each realize that the other is a spy, they plot to kill each other, leading to a showdown at the dinner table. They stop fighting when they discover that a third party has been watching them and emerge from the front door with fear and uncertainty, ending the video on a cliffhanger.

Following the video's release, Moroney stated that she sustained bruises on her knees and probably a concussion during filming.

== Charts ==
Chart performance for "Wish I Didn't"
Chart (2026)	Peak position
Canada Hot 100 (Billboard)	63
New Zealand Hot Singles (RMNZ)	20
US Billboard Hot 100	41
US Adult Pop Airplay (Billboard)	31
US Hot Country Songs (Billboard)	12
