= 6 Months Later =

2025 single by Megan Moroney

Single by Megan Moroney

from the album Cloud 9
- Released: June 20, 2025
- Genre: Country
- Length: 3:02
- Label: Sony
- Songwriters: Megan Moroney; Ben Williams; David Mescon; Rob Hatch
- Producer: Kristian Bush

Megan Moroney singles chronology
"You Had to Be There" (2025)	"6 Months Later" (2025)	"Beautiful Things" (2025)

Music video
- "6 Months Later" on YouTube

"6 Months Later" is a song by American country music singer Megan Moroney. Initially released on June 20, 2025, as a promotional single, it was released to country radio on July 14, 2025, as the lead single from her third studio album Cloud 9, and later received an official adds date of August 11, 2025. It was written by Moroney, Ben Williams, David "Messy" Mescon, and Rob Hatch, and produced by Kristian Bush.

== Background ==
The song was written in February 2025, during the third annual writers retreat Megan Moroney took with songwriters Ben Williams, Rob Hatch, and David Mescon. Moroney introduced the song's title and hook, as well as her plans for it to be the "summer tempo single" for her forthcoming record. The opening line of the chorus, where Moroney namechecks herself, was inspired by Miley Cyrus, who did the same in her song, "See You Again". Kristian Bush produced the track at Nashville's Blackbird Studio.

Moroney began teasing the song in February 2025, right after it was written. For the next few months, she shared snippets of the song on social media, before hinting and finally confirming the release date.

== Composition and lyrics ==
The song centers around one's feelings after a breakup, over an instrumental of guitar and drums. At the start of the song, the protagonist feels devastated after her partner decided to end their relationship. With her distinctive dark humor, Megan Moroney describes feeling like she was close to death but survived, highlighting that as she recovered from grief, she realized she was better off without her ex. He calls her six months later in an attempt to re-enter the relationship, but she turns him down. The narrator sarcastically compliments him for supposedly being "stable" after going to therapy and "OK well... your next girlfriend will be so lucky". She plays on the phrase "What doesn't kill you makes you stronger", singing in the chorus: "What doesn't kill you calls you 6 months later", and in the bridge: "What doesn't kill you / Makes you stronger and blonder and hotter / Makes you wonder what you even saw in him at all / What doesn't kill you always calls".

== Critical reception ==
Maxim Mower of Holler wrote that the song "finds Megan Moroney's charismatic, conversational vocals gliding across the energizing instrumental, with the 'Tennessee Orange' hitmaker delivering each amusing punchline and cutting witticism with a metaphorical wink. The infectious, bright guitar riff that extends throughout the track combines with a simple, rhythmic drum pattern to give this a slightly nostalgic country feel."

== Music video ==
The music video premiered on July 16, 2025, and was directed by Megan Moroney and Cece Dawson. In it, Moroney portrays a customer service representative at a fictional call center called Karma Now! Hotline, where she helps a heartbroken version of herself get back at her ex. She enacts revenge by tracking him from her computer screen and interfering with a "magic button panel", finding subtle ways to ruin his day like making his milk go sour and his steak taste bad, until he finally caves and calls Moroney's character back while she's sitting in her bedroom, allowing her the satisfaction of turning him down.

== Charts ==
=== Weekly charts ===
Weekly chart performance for "6 Months Later"
Chart (2025–2026)	Peak position
Canada Hot 100 (Billboard)	34
Canada Country (Billboard)	1
Global 200 (Billboard)	106
New Zealand Hot Singles (RMNZ)	28
UK Country Airplay (Radiomonitor)	1
US Billboard Hot 100	29
US Country Airplay (Billboard)	2
US Hot Country Songs (Billboard)	8

=== Year-end charts ===
Year-end chart performance for "6 Months Later"
Chart (2025)	Position
US Hot Country Songs (Billboard)	41

== Certifications ==
Certifications for "6 Months Later"
Region	Certification	Certified units/sales
United States (RIAA)	Platinum	1,000,000^{‡}
^{‡} Sales+streaming figures based on certification alone.
