= Springsteen (song) =

Single by Eric Church

from the album Chief
- Released: February 21, 2012
- Recorded: 2011
- Genre: Country; heartland rock
- Length: 3:47 (single version); 4:23 (album version)
- Label: EMI Nashville
- Songwriters: Eric Church; Jeff Hyde; Ryan Tyndell
- Producer: Jay Joyce

Eric Church singles chronology
"Drink in My Hand" (2011)	"Springsteen" (2012)	"Creepin'" (2012)

"Springsteen" is a song co-written and recorded by the American country music artist Eric Church. It was released on February 21, 2012, as the third single from his third album Chief. Church wrote the song with Jeff Hyde and Ryan Tyndell. It was inspired by a memory of a girl and another artist's song, but he chose to center it around an idol of his, Bruce Springsteen, and to tell the story of a teenage romance.

"Springsteen" was received with critical acclaim for its melody and strong lyrics making it one of the top country songs of 2012. The single reached number 19 on the Billboard Hot 100, becoming Church's first song to enter the top 20 on that chart. The song also topped the US Billboard Hot Country Songs. Outside of the United States, the song peaked at 28 on the Canadian Hot 100. "Springsteen" was certified eight-times Platinum by the Recording Industry Association of America (RIAA). The song was nominated for two Grammy Awards on December 12, 2012, but failed to win any of the awards at the ceremony in 2013.

The accompanying music video was directed by Peter Zavadil and premiered on April 13, 2012, on Maxim.com. The video features Eric Church playing instruments in a suburban neighborhood, while a couple is shown going through the ups and downs of a relationship.

== Composition ==
"Springsteen" features drums and a synthesizer, along with live instrumentation from the guitar and keyboard. The song notably lacks both the fiddle and steel guitar, which are staples of country music. Eric Church uses his voice throughout the piece to convey emotion, with his pitch and tone changing from verse to verse. The song is composed of two verses with a chorus that is repeated several times. The song is set in the key of D major with a main chord pattern of D–G–Bm–A and a vocal range of A3–E5.

Eric Church wrote the song with Jeff Hyde and Ryan Tyndell. The basis for the song came from a memory of a girl and involved another artist's song. Church chose to base the song around an idol of his, Bruce Springsteen, whose career he admires. During the course of the song, Church makes several allusions to Springsteen; he mentions the Springsteen songs "Born to Run", "Born in the USA", "Glory Days", and "I'm on Fire". While being named after Springsteen and making several references to him, the song however tells the story of a teenage romance. Bruce Springsteen later wrote Eric a letter saying how he and his family enjoyed the song and that he hoped that Eric and he would cross paths soon.

== Critical reception ==
"Springsteen" received critical acclaim from many music critics. Billy Dukes of Taste of Country gave the song five stars out of five, calling it "the best song from one of 2011's top country albums". Matt Bjorke of Roughstock also gave the song five stars of five, writing that "the strong, sing-a-long lyrics and driving, percussive melody brings Eric Church to an accessibility that he's previously never had". Noah Eaton of Country Universe gave it an A−, saying that it is "a gorgeous, bittersweet anthem-to-be that will likely leave even some more hardened hearts simultaneously smile and cry listening". Eaton went on further to say that this song would propel Church's career to the next level. American Songwriter chose the song for its Lyric of the Week feature, for the week of June 11, 2012. The song was nominated for two Grammy Awards – Best Country Solo Performance and Best Country Song – on December 12, 2012, but failed to win any of the awards at the ceremony in 2013.

Thom Jerek of AllMusic said the song had "a clever, if somewhat cloying, tune, but it gets the feeling across in spades". The A.V. Club reviewer Steven Hyden claims that Church "is just as effective on slower, more thoughtful songs like "Springsteen" and that the song "[reflects] reflecting on music's power to revive forgotten emotions from the past". Bruce Springsteen himself took note of Church's music, specifically the song "Springsteen", and wrote Church a note on the back of a setlist. Church received the letter from Springsteen's after a show on August 19, 2012. In the note, Springsteen explained his and his family's love of the song and that he hoped to have their paths cross at some point. Church was surprised when receiving the note and said that "it's a long note, takes up the entire back page of this setlist for a show that lasted three hours and 47 minutes".

Rolling Stone ranked "Springsteen" at number 58 on their list of the 100 Greatest Country Songs of All Time, the fifth highest ranking for a song released in the 21st century behind Carrie Underwood's "Before He Cheats" (number 57), Brad Paisley's "Alcohol" (number 54), Kacey Musgraves' "Follow Your Arrow" (number 39) and Taylor Swift's "Mean" (number 24). In a 2024 update, the publication expanded the ranking to the 200 Greatest Country Songs of All Time, with "Springsteen" placing at number 58 once again. The magazine also ranked the song number 391 on its 2021 list of The 500 Greatest Songs of All Time.

== Music video ==
The song's accompanying music video was directed by Peter Zavadil and premiered on April 13, 2012, on Maxim.com. The video was later made available for purchase through iTunes on April 20, 2012. The video is set in a suburban neighborhood located in Murfreesboro, Tennessee and work on the video began in early March 2012. Church allowed all the neighborhood kids to make cameos in the film. The video was later nominated for Music Video of the Year for 2012 Country Music Awards; however, it lost out to Toby Keith's "Red Solo Cup" for the award.

The music video begins with a girl (portrayed by Kelsey Pribilski) talking about what she wants in her next boyfriend while on some bleachers. After her monologue is over, the video cuts between shots of Eric Church and scenes of the girl and a boy during the best and worst times in their relationship. Church is seen throughout the video either playing with his band in a garage, in the middle of the street on a piano, or walking through the streets with an American flag around his shoulders while singing. The video ends without showing whether the girl and boy ended up together.

== Chart and sales performance ==
"Springsteen" debuted at number 52 on the US Billboard Hot Country Songs chart for the week of February 18, 2012. On June 23, 2012, it later became Eric Church's second number one single on the US Billboard Hot Country Songs after "Drink in My Hand" in January 2012. The record reached two million copies sold in January 2013 and has gone on to be certified eight-times Platinum by the Recording Industry Association of America (RIAA). The song has sold 2,783,000 copies in the US as of August 2016.

On the Canadian Hot 100, the single reached a peak of 28 on the charts before falling down the rankings. On September 5, 2012, sales for the song in Canada received Gold and Platinum certifications, and on July 11, 2013, it achieved double Platinum status with over 80,000 records sold.

== Charts and certifications ==
=== Weekly charts ===
Chart (2012)	Peak position
Canada Country (Billboard)	1
Canada Hot 100 (Billboard)	28
US Billboard Hot 100	19
US Hot Country Songs (Billboard)	1

=== Year-end charts ===
Chart (2012)	Position
Canada (Canadian Hot 100)	88
US Billboard Hot 100	58
US Country Songs (Billboard)	9

=== Certifications ===
Region	Certification	Certified units/sales
Canada (Music Canada)	2× Platinum	160,000^{*}
United States (RIAA)	8× Platinum	2,783,000
^{*} Sales figures based on certification alone.
