= Creepin' (Eric Church song) =

2012 song by Eric Church

Single by Eric Church

from the album Chief
- Released: July 16, 2012
- Recorded: 2011
- Genre: Hard rock; country rock
- Length: 3:53
- Label: EMI Nashville
- Songwriters: Eric Church; Marv Green
- Producer: Jay Joyce

Eric Church singles chronology
| "Springsteen" (2012) | "Creepin'" (2012) | "The Only Way I Know" (2012) |

"Creepin'" is a song co-written and recorded by American country music singer Eric Church. It was released in July 2012 as the fourth single from his third album Chief (2011). Co-written by Church and Marv Green, the mid-tempo track is a narrator describing a memory about a former lover that's similar to "creepin'". The song received positive reviews from critics. "Creepin'" peaked at numbers five and 10 on both the U.S. Billboard Country Airplay and Hot Country Songs charts respectively. It also reached number 56 on the Hot 100. "Creepin'" was certified Platinum by the Recording Industry Association of America (RIAA), denoting sales of over one million units in the United States. It achieved chart prominence in Canada, reaching number 65 on the Canadian Hot 100. The song garnered a Gold certification from Music Canada, denoting sales of 40,000 units in that country. The accompanying music video for the single, directed by Peter Zavadil, takes place around the turn of the 20th century and follows a man in a runaway train being haunted by a female ghost.

== Background and development ==
"Creepin'" is a mid-tempo track in which the narrator describes the memory of a former lover as being similar to "creepin'". The song is set in the key of C major, mainly accompanied by guitars set in Drop C tuning (CGCFAD). It also features a banjo and an electric guitar, as well as several vocal effects on Church's voice. Church came up with the song while hungover inside a screened in porch and as he continued to play it the title came to his head, which he later told co-writer Marv Green about the next day and loved it, helping to provide the track with the chorus and putting together the rest of the storyline. In a Rolling Stone interview, Church said that the track was important to him after "Springsteen", and he wanted both the radio and the public to listen to something that's "so odd and boundary-pushing."

== Critical reception ==
Jonathan Keefe of Slant Magazine said that the song "slinks and slithers along a rhythm arrangement that owes more to vintage funk than traditional country". Giving it four stars out of five, Jessica Nicholson of Country Weekly said that it had "vivid imagery" and that "this swampy tune grabs the listener's attention from the get-go." In 2017, Billboard contributor Chuck Dauphin put "Creepin'" at number six on his top 10 list of Church's best songs.

== Commercial performance ==
On the week of July 7, 2012, "Creepin'" debuted at number 54 on both the Billboard Country Airplay and Hot Country Songs charts respectively. It peaked at numbers five and 10 on both charts, and spent twenty-eight and twenty-nine weeks respectively. On the Billboard Hot 100, the song debuted at number 95 the week of September 8. Sixteen weeks later, it peaked at number 56 the week of December 29, and remained on the chart for twenty weeks. It was certified 2× platinum by the RIAA in the US on October 30, 2024.

In Canada, the track debuted at number 100 on the Canadian Hot 100 the week of September 1, before leaving the chart. Two weeks later, it reappeared at number 82 and peaked at number 65 the week of November 30, staying on the chart for twenty weeks. It was certified gold by Music Canada in Canada on January 16, 2013.

== Music video ==
The music video was directed by Peter Zavadil and premiered in September 2012. Shot in Chattanooga, the video takes place on a runaway train around the turn of the 20th century, following a man being haunted by a female ghost that's feeding said train with coal and having the man go through various memories.

== Charts and certifications ==
=== Weekly charts ===
| Chart (2012–2013) | Peak position |
|---|---|
| Canada Country (Billboard) | 8 |
| Canada Hot 100 (Billboard) | 65 |
| US Billboard Hot 100 | 56 |
| US Hot Country Songs (Billboard) | 10 |
| US Country Airplay (Billboard) | 5 |

=== Year-end charts ===
| Chart (2012) | Position |
|---|---|
| US Hot Country Songs (Billboard) | 63 |

| Chart (2013) | Position |
|---|---|
| US Country Airplay (Billboard) | 80 |
| US Hot Country Songs (Billboard) | 79 |

=== Certifications ===
| Region | Certification | Certified units/sales |
|---|---|---|
| Canada (Music Canada) | Gold | 40,000^{*} |
| United States (RIAA) | 2× Platinum | 2,000,000^{‡} |
^{*} Sales figures based on certification alone.^{‡} Sales+streaming figures based on certification alone.

== Parodies ==
Country music parodist Cledus T. Judd recorded a parody of "Creepin'", entitled "Tweetin'", on his 2012 album Parodyziac!!
