= Good Times & Tan Lines =

Single by Zach Top

from the album Ain't in It for My Health
- Released: June 9, 2025
- Recorded: Sound Stage Studios (Nashville, Tennessee)
- Genre: Neotraditional country
- Length: 2:41
- Label: Leo33
- Songwriters: Carson Chamberlain; Wyatt McCubbin; Zach Top
- Producer: Carson Chamberlain

Zach Top singles chronology
"I Never Lie" (2024)	"Good Times & Tan Lines" (2025)	"South of Sanity" (2026)

Music video
- "Good Times & Tan Lines" on YouTube

"Good Times & Tan Lines" is a song by American country music singer Zach Top. It was released on June 9, 2025, as the lead single from his second studio album, Ain't in It for My Health. Top co-wrote the song with Carson Chamberlain and Wyatt McCubbin, and it was produced by Chamberlain.

== Background and composition ==
Following the success of his debut album Cold Beer & Country Music, Zach Top began teasing new material during his live performances while wrapping up production on his new record. During a Q&A session at the 2025 Houston Livestock Show and Rodeo, Top confirmed that the album was near complete and in the final mixing stages, with a release scheduled for later that year.

The song was co-written by Top alongside his producer, Carson Chamberlain, and Wyatt McCubbin. It was officially released on June 9, 2025. The release was surprise-released immediately after Top performed the song on the main stage of Nissan Stadium during his CMA Fest debut in early June 2025.

== Critical reception ==
The song was named by Jessica Nicholson of Billboard as one of five "must-hear new country songs" alongside songs by Hailey Whitters and Old Dominion. Nicholson added that it was "strongly Alan Jackson-coded."

== Music video ==
The music video for "Good Times & Tan Lines" was directed by Citizen Kane Wayne and premiered on June 30, 2025.

== Credits and personnel ==
Credits adapted from Tidal.

- Zach Top – vocals, acoustic guitar, background vocals
- Jimmy Carter – bass guitar
- Tommy Harden – drums
- Brent Mason – electric guitar
- Andy Leftwich – fiddle
- Scotty Sanders – pedal steel guitar
- Gary Prim – piano
- Carson Chamberlain – production
- Matt Rovey – mixing, engineering
- Ken Love – mastering
- Jason Campbell – production assistant
- Will Kienzle – assistant engineering

== Charts ==
=== Weekly charts ===
Weekly chart performance for "Good Times & Tan Lines"
Chart (2025)	Peak position
Australia Country Hot 50 (The Music)	3
Canada Hot 100 (Billboard)	100
Canada Country (Billboard)	6
UK Country Airplay (Radiomonitor)	5
US Billboard Hot 100	75
US Country Airplay (Billboard)	12
US Hot Country Songs (Billboard)	19

=== Year-end charts ===
Year-end chart performance for "Good Times & Tan Lines"
Chart (2025)	Position
US Hot Country Songs (Billboard)	86

== Certifications ==
Region	Certification	Certified units/sales
Canada (Music Canada)	Gold	40,000^{‡}
^{‡} Sales+streaming figures based on certification alone.
