= Ain't in It for My Health =

Studio album by Zach Top
- Released: August 29, 2025
- Genre: Neotraditional country
- Length: 49:38
- Label: Leo33
- Producer: Carson Chamberlain

Zach Top chronology
Cold Beer & Country Music (2024)	Ain't in It for My Health (2025)

Singles from Ain't in It for My Health
- 1. "Good Times & Tan Lines" Released: June 9, 2025; 2. "South of Sanity" Released: January 2026

Ain't in It for My Health is the second studio album by American country music artist Zach Top. The album was released on August 29, 2025 under the record label Leo33 and was produced by Carson Chamberlain. It was preceded by two singles, "Good Times & Tan Lines" and "South of Sanity". Top promoted the album both through supporting Dierks Bentley's Broken Branches Tour and his own headlining Cold Beer & Country Music Tour.

The album received generally positive reviews from music critics, who praised Top's continued neotraditional country sound while noting a more relaxed, lighthearted tone compared to his debut album. It debuted at number 11 on the Billboard 200 and charted in Australia, Canada, and the United Kingdom.

Ain't in It for My Health won the inaugural Grammy Award for Best Traditional Country Album at the 68th Annual Grammy Awards.

== Background and recording ==
The album was first announced on June 9, 2025, when Top debuted its lead single, "Good Times & Tan Lines," live on the main stage at CMA Fest at Nissan Stadium in Nashville. The song was released immediately following the performance and accompanied by the announcement of the new album. On social media, Top confirmed, "The subtle hints and cryptic announcements are over... 'Ain't In It For My Health' will be out 8/29."

Top reunites on this album with Carson Chamberlain, and many of Top's previous co-writers, including Tim Nichols, Wyatt McCubbin, Paul Overstreet, and Mark Nesler, who were included on Top's previous album, Cold Beer & Country Music. While his debut album leaned heavily into traditional honky-tonk and bluegrass influences, Ain't in It for My Health is reportedly more relaxed in tone, featuring sun-soaked imagery and nods to Jimmy Buffett-style escapism, as heard in the lead single and tracks like "Flip--Flop."

Top supported Ain't in It for My Health in two major touring legs. He featured as an opener on Dierks Bentley's Broken Branches Tour, performing in major markets including, Toronto, Los Angeles, and Madison Square Garden in New York City. Bentley himself praised Top's traditionalist approach and instrumental skill, saying, "He's got the bluegrass chops to hang with the best of 'em in a jam."

Top embarked on a headlining tour titled the Cold Beer & Country Music Tour that began on 27 September 2025 at Cook's Garage in Lubbock, Texas, and concluded at Rogers Arena in Vancouver. Notable stops included Red Rocks Amphitheatre, KFC Yum! Center, and Charlottesville's John Paul Jones Arena. Supporting acts included Jake Worthington and Andy Buckner. The tour was extended in early 2026 to include several European locations as well as more US locations later in the year.

== Themes ==
Described as a "jovial, laid-back tribute to simply having fun," the album channels a lighthearted, beachy vibe while still maintaining Top's signature traditionalist sound. Billboard praised "Good Times & Tan Lines" for its "strongly Alan Jackson-coded, twangy guitar intro and piles of fiddle" layered beneath lyrics about "a more laid-back time of friendship, chilled beverages, and ample time on a beach or lake."

In contrast, "South of Sanity" presents a more introspective and emotionally resonant ballad. Written about the toll of balancing life on the road with a strained relationship, the track blends 1980s-inspired production with vivid storytelling. "When we hung up she was talking leaving / Now how am I supposed to sing and play?" Top asks in the song, depicting the disintegration of a long-distance romance.

== Release and critical reception ==
Professional ratings
Review scores
Source	Rating
AllMusic	3.5/5 stars
Country Central	9.7/10
Entertainment Focus	4.5/5 stars
Pitchfork	7.2/10
Rolling Stone	3.5/5 stars

Prior to the album's release, early singles were met with strong critical support. "Good Times & Tan Lines" was described by Billboard as a "top country anthem for the summer" and praised for its catchy, radio-ready hooks. Rolling Stone called "South of Sanity" a "slice of slick and satisfying Eighties balladry," highlighting Top's expanding stylistic range while retaining lyrical depth.

The album was released on digital streaming platforms as well as in CD and vinyl formats. The vinyl release includes a bonus recording of "I Never Lie" from Top's performance at the Ryman Auditorium.

== Accolades ==
Organization	Year	Category	Result	Ref.
Grammy Awards	2026	Best Traditional Country Album	Won	

== Track listing ==
All tracks are written by Zach Top and Carson Chamberlain, with additional co-writers as noted.

No.	Title	Writer(s)	Length
1.	"Guitar"	Tim Nichols	3:14
2.	"Good Times & Tan Lines"	Wyatt McCubbin	2:41
3.	"When You See Me"	McCubbin	3:36
4.	"Splitsville"	Paul Overstreet	3:43
5.	"Between the Ditches"	McCubbin	3:15
6.	"Flip--Flop"	Overstreet	3:36
7.	"Livin' a Lie"	McCubbin	3:39
8.	"Tightrope"		3:13
9.	"I Know a Place"	Nichols	3:17
10.	"She Makes"	Nichols	3:00
11.	"South of Sanity"	Mark Nesler	3:41
12.	"Like I Want You"		2:54
13.	"Country Boy Blues"		2:44
14.	"Lovin' the Wrong Things"		3:53
15.	"Honky Tonk Till It Hurts"	Nichols	3:12
Total length:			49:38

Vinyl exclusive
No.	Title	Writer(s)	Length
16.	"I Never Lie" (live)	Nichols	3:12
Total length:			52:50

== Personnel ==
Credits are adapted from the album's liner notes.

- Zach Top – vocals, background vocals (all tracks), acoustic guitar (tracks 1–5, 7, 9, 10, 12–14), acoustic solo guitar (1, 3)
- Tommy Harden – drums (all tracks), percussion (1, 4–6, 10, 11, 15)
- Jimmy Carter – bass guitar (all tracks)
- Brent Mason – electric guitar (all tracks)
- Scotty Sanders – steel guitar (1–11, 13–15), Dobro (12)
- Andy Leftwich – acoustic rhythm guitar (1, 3), fiddle (2, 5, 7, 8, 12–15), acoustic guitar (3, 4, 6, 8–11, 15), mandolin (6)
- Gary Prim – piano (1–5, 8, 13, 15), keyboards (6, 9, 11, 12), Wurlitzer (10)
- Carson Chamberlain – production (all tracks)
- Matt Rovey – mixing (all tracks), engineering (all tracks)
- Ken Love – mastering (all tracks)
- Jason Campbell – production coordinator (all tracks)
- Will Kienzle – engineering assistance (1–4, 10, 11)
- Jordan Reed – engineering assistance (5, 7, 12–14)
- Kam Luchterhand – engineering assistance (6, 8, 9, 15)
- Citizen Kane Wayne – photography, design
- Dusty Cantrell – assistant designer

== Charts ==
=== Weekly charts ===
Weekly chart performance for Ain't in It for My Health
Chart (2025)	Peak position
Australian Country Albums (ARIA)	35
Canadian Albums (Billboard)	44
UK Album Downloads (Official Charts)	55
UK Americana Albums (Official Charts)	13
UK Country Albums (Official Charts)	9
UK Independent Albums Breakers (OCC)	15
US Billboard 200	11
US Independent Albums (Billboard)	2
US Top Country Albums (Billboard)	4

=== Year-end charts ===
Year-end chart performance for Ain't in It for My Health
Chart (2025)	Position
US Top Country Albums (Billboard)	70
