= Use Me (Zach Top song) =

Promotional single by Zach Top

from the album Cold Beer & Country Music
- Released: February 23, 2024
- Recorded: 2021
- Studio: Backstage, Nashville, Tennessee
- Genre: Neotraditional country
- Length: 3:56
- Label: Leo33
- Songwriters: Carson Chamberlain; Tim Nichols; Zach Top
- Producer: Carson Chamberlain

"Use Me" is a song by American country music singer Zach Top. It was released on February 23, 2024, via Leo33 as the fifth and final promotional single from his debut studio album, Cold Beer & Country Music. Top co-wrote the song with Carson Chamberlain and Tim Nichols, with Chamberlain also producing. The track has been certified Platinum by the Recording Industry Association of America.

== Background ==
Following years of recording as a bluegrass performer, Top pivoted to country music, and in September 2023, it was announced that he was signed as the flagship artist for the newly-formed independent record label Leo33. His debut album, Cold Beer & Country Music was announced on January 8, 2024, with "Use Me" featuring as the ninth track. Top co-wrote all twelve of the album's tracks with producer Carson Chamberlain, with "Use Me" being co-written by the duo alongside Tim Nichols, who also wrote Top's single "I Never Lie" from the album.

In an interview with American Songwriter, Top cited "Use Me" as one of his favorite songs on the record, but was unsure of how it would be received by fans, stating, “ I think that’s such a raw and real song. And I think it’s unexpected. That’s not a fashionable thing right now—a cheatin’ waltz. But, since we put it out a couple of weeks ago, it has been the fastest-growing song that we’ve put out as far as streaming numbers. I knew it would be a love it or hate it thing because of the nature of the song”.

== Lyrics and composition ==
"Use Me" is a neotraditional country ballad chronicling the desperation of one lonely heart to another, and paints a poignant picture of two people finding temporary comfort in each other's company. In an Instagram post announcing the release of the song, Top dubbed the song a “cheatin’ waltz” and joked, “that’s what the hip kids are into these days.”

== Live performances ==
Top performed the song at the 60th Academy of Country Music Awards, where he received the New Male Artist of the Year award.

== Credits and personnel ==
Credits adapted from Tidal.

- Jason Campbell – producing assistance
- Jimmy Carter – bass
- Carson Chamberlain – production
- Tommy Harden – drums
- Jeff Huskins engineering
- Will Kienzle – engineering assistance
- Andy Leftwich – acoustic guitar
- Ken Love – mastering
- Brent Mason – electric guitar
- Gary Prim – piano
- Matt Rovey – mixing, engineering
- Scotty Sanders - pedal steel
- Zach Top – vocals, acoustic guitar, electric guitar

== Charts ==
=== Weekly charts ===
Weekly chart performance for "Use Me"
Chart (2025)	Peak position
US Country Airplay (Billboard)	51
US Hot Country Songs (Billboard)	37

=== Year-end charts ===
Year-end chart performance for "Use Me"
Chart (2025)	Position
US Hot Country Songs (Billboard)	99

== Certifications ==
Certifications for "Use Me"
Region	Certification	Certified units/sales
Canada (Music Canada)	Gold	40,000^{‡}
United States (RIAA)	Platinum	1,000,000^{‡}
^{‡} Sales+streaming figures based on certification alone.
