= South of Sanity (song) =

Single by Zach Top

from the album Ain't in It for My Health
- Released: January 2026
- Recorded: Sound Stage Studios (Nashville, Tennessee)
- Genre: Neotraditional country
- Length: 3:41
- Label: Leo33
- Songwriters: Carson Chamberlain; Mark Nesler; Zach Top
- Producer: Carson Chamberlain

Zach Top singles chronology
"Good Times & Tan Lines" (2025)	"South of Sanity" (2026)

"South of Sanity" is a song recorded by American country music singer Zach Top. It was released in January 2026 as the second single from his second studio album, Ain't in It for My Health. Top co-wrote the song with Carson Chamberlain and Mark Nesler, and was produced by Chamberlain.

== Background and composition ==
Top announced the song as a promotional single by sharing an acoustic teaser the night before its release, captioned simply: "New one comin in hot."

== Critical reception ==
"South of Sanity" was praised by critics. Holler called it "an emotional single that will have you sitting at your window, crying, looking at the rain," noting the song's powerful juxtaposition to Top's previous release. Rolling Stone praised the track's "pristine production" and called it "a slice of slick and satisfying Eighties balladry." Whiskey Riff highlighted it as "some of Top's best work yet," remarking on its cautionary tale of love list in the grind of a musician's life. Country Thang Daily described Top as "the mainstream's saving grace" and asserted that "South of Sanity" "proves once again that he's not here to chase trends. He's here to keep country country."

== Credits and personnel ==
Credits adapted from Tidal.

- Zach Top – lead vocals, background vocals
- Tommy Harden – drums, percussion
- Jimmy Carter – bass guitar
- Brent Mason – electric guitar
- Scotty Sanders – pedal steel guitar
- Andy Leftwich – acoustic guitar
- Gary Prim – keyboards
- Carson Chamberlain – production
- Matt Rovey – mixing, engineering
- Ken Love – mastering
- Jason Campbell – production assistance
- Will Kienzle – engineering assistance

== Charts ==
Chart performance for "South of Sanity"
Chart (2025–2026)	Peak position
Canada Hot 100 (Billboard)	70
Canada Country (Billboard)	22
US Billboard Hot 100	63
US Country Airplay (Billboard)	12
US Hot Country Songs (Billboard)	21

== Certifications ==
Certifications for "South of Sanity"
Region	Certification	Certified units/sales
Canada (Music Canada)	Gold	40,000^{‡}
United States (RIAA)	Gold	500,000^{‡}
^{‡} Sales+streaming figures based on certification alone.
