= Bad Luck (Zach Top song) =

Promotional single by Zach Top

from the album Cold Beer & Country Music
- Released: October 28, 2022
- Recorded: 2021
- Studio: Backstage, Nashville, Tennessee
- Genre: Neotraditional Country
- Length: 3:19
- Label: Leo33
- Songwriters: Carson Chamberlain; Mark Nesler; Zach Top
- Producer: Carson Chamberlain

Music video
- "Bad Luck" music video on YouTube

"Bad Luck" is a song by American country music singer Zach Top. It was released on October 28, 2022, via Leo33 as the third promotional single from his debut studio album, Cold Beer & Country Music. Top co-wrote the song with Carson Chamberlain and Mark Nesler, with Chamberlain also producing. It became Top's first song to chart on the Billboard Hot Country Songs chart, reaching the top forty in July 2024, and has been certified Platinum by the Recording Industry Association of America and Music Canada.

A new version of the song featuring bluegrass singer and musician Billy Strings was released on February 28, 2025, as part of their collaborative extended play Me & Billy.

== Background ==
Following years of recording as a bluegrass performer, Top pivoted to country music, and in September 2023, it was announced that he was signed as the flagship artist for the newly-formed independent record label Leo33. His debut album, Cold Beer & Country Music was announced on January 8, 2024, with "Bad Luck" featuring as the seventh track. Top co-wrote all twelve of the album's tracks with producer Carson Chamberlain, with three songs, including "Bad Luck" co-written by the duo along with Mark Nesler.

== Lyrics and composition ==
"Bad Luck" is a blues-inspired neotraditional country song that has been described as a “dive bar anthem”. Lyrically, it tells the story of a gambler who just can’t catch a break. The song sees him losing everything. However, his luck turns around when he meets “the one.” The narrator describes various cases of running into bad luck, including seeing a black cat, losing his rent money playing the lottery, and several failed relationships, but feels that his unlucky streak is over now he has found a new love interest.

== Music video ==
The music video for "Bad Luck" was directed by Citizen Kane Wayne and premiered on October 31, 2023. It begins with Top driving his pickup truck down the street at night, interspersed with various scenes of him at the local bar: playing poker, drinking, playing his guitar, and playing pool.

== Credits and personnel ==
Credits adapted from Tidal.

- Carson Chamberlain – production
- Tommy Harden – drums
- Andy Leftwich – acoustic guitar
- Ken Love – mastering
- Kam Luchterand – engineering assistance
- Brent Mason – electric guitar
- Gary Prim – piano
- Matt Rovey – mixing, engineering
- Scotty Sanders - dobro
- Zach Top – vocals, acoustic guitar, electric guitar
- Glenn Worf – bass

== Charts ==
Weekly chart performance for "Bad Luck"
Chart (2024)	Peak position
US Hot Country Songs (Billboard)	38

== Certifications ==
Certifications for "Bad Luck"
Region	Certification	Certified units/sales
Canada (Music Canada)	Platinum	80,000^{‡}
United States (RIAA)	Platinum	1,000,000^{‡}
^{‡} Sales+streaming figures based on certification alone.
