= Sounds Like the Radio =

Single by Zach Top

from the album Cold Beer & Country Music
- Released: January 8, 2024
- Recorded: November 23, 2021
- Studio: Backstage, Nashville, Tennessee
- Genre: Neotraditional country
- Length: 3:38
- Label: Leo33
- Songwriters: Zach Top; Carson Chamberlain; Wyatt McCubbin
- Producer: Carson Chamberlain

Zach Top singles chronology
"Sounds Like the Radio" (2024)	"I Never Lie" (2024)

"Sounds Like the Radio" is a song by American country music singer Zach Top. It was released on January 8, 2024, as his debut single to country radio. It served as the lead single to Top's debut studio album, Cold Beer & Country Music. Top co-wrote the song with Carson Chamberlain and Wyatt McCubbin, with Chamberlain also producing it.

== Background ==
Following years of recording as a bluegrass performer, Top pivoted to country music, and in September 2023, it was announced that he was signed as the flagship artist for the newly-formed independent record label Leo33. Carson Chamberlain, who played steel guitar for Keith Whitley in the 1980s and wrote songs for Alan Jackson in the 1990s, came up with the hook of the song and pitched it at a songwriting session with Wyatt McCubbin and Zach Top on September 25, 2020. Top bought into it immediately due to his love of 1990s-era country music, and the three developed the song based around heavy references to the decade including the mullet, jukeboxes, and name-checking "Chattahoochee" in its opening line. They cut a rough demo that day, but it wasn't until November 23, 2021, that Top entered Nashville's Backstage studio to record the song, after it had helped land him a publishing deal with Major Bob Music. On its release as his debut single to country radio several years later, Top said that "literally the day we wrote it, it was like that was meant to be my first single. It seems like an awesome introduction to me and the type of music that people are going to be getting from me. If you like it, great. If not, don't expect nothing different".

== Critical reception ==
In a review for Holler, Soda Canter favorably described the track as "a nostalgic throwback to the heydays of the late '90s" that foreshadows the kind of artist Zach Top is. Will Chapman of Country Central called it a "raucous country opener" for the Cold Beer & Country Music album and praised the instrumentation, highlighting the fiddle, steel, and the telecaster played by Brent Mason that added to the early 90s nostalgia of the track. Taste of Country placed it at number 32 on its list of the Top 40 Country Songs of 2024.

== Music video ==
The music video for "Sounds Like the Radio" was directed by Citizen Kane Wayne and premiered on January 12, 2024. It opens with Top and his band arriving at a rural radio station via pickup truck, where they tie up the disc jockey and plug into the sound board, before performing the song outside, allowing listeners to hear it over the airwaves. The video progresses with the band loading up their equipment and moving to a dive bar, where Top performs the song again in front of a crowd.

== Chart performance ==
"Sounds Like the Radio" debuted at number 56 on Billboard Country Airplay, and pulled in adds from 55 stations upon impact date. It has since reached the top 20 of that chart.

== Charts ==
=== Weekly charts ===
Weekly chart performance for "Sounds Like the Radio"
Chart (2024)	Peak position
Australia Country Hot 50 (The Music)	21
Canada Hot 100 (Billboard)	97
Canada Country (Billboard)	8
US Bubbling Under Hot 100 (Billboard)	5
US Country Airplay (Billboard)	15
US Hot Country Songs (Billboard)	29

=== Year-end charts ===
Year-end chart performance for "Sounds Like the Radio"
Chart (2024)	Position
US Country Airplay (Billboard)	57

== Certifications ==
Certifications for "Sounds Like The Radio"
Region	Certification	Certified units/sales
Canada (Music Canada)	Platinum	80,000^{‡}
United States (RIAA)	Platinum	1,000,000^{‡}
^{‡} Sales+streaming figures based on certification alone.
