= 60th Academy of Country Music Awards =

US music awards ceremony in 2025

- Date: May 8, 2025
- Location: Ford Center at The Star, Frisco, Texas
- Hosted by: Reba McEntire

Highlights
- Most wins: Ella Langley (5)
- Most nominations: Ella Langley (7)

Television/radio coverage
- Network: Prime Video

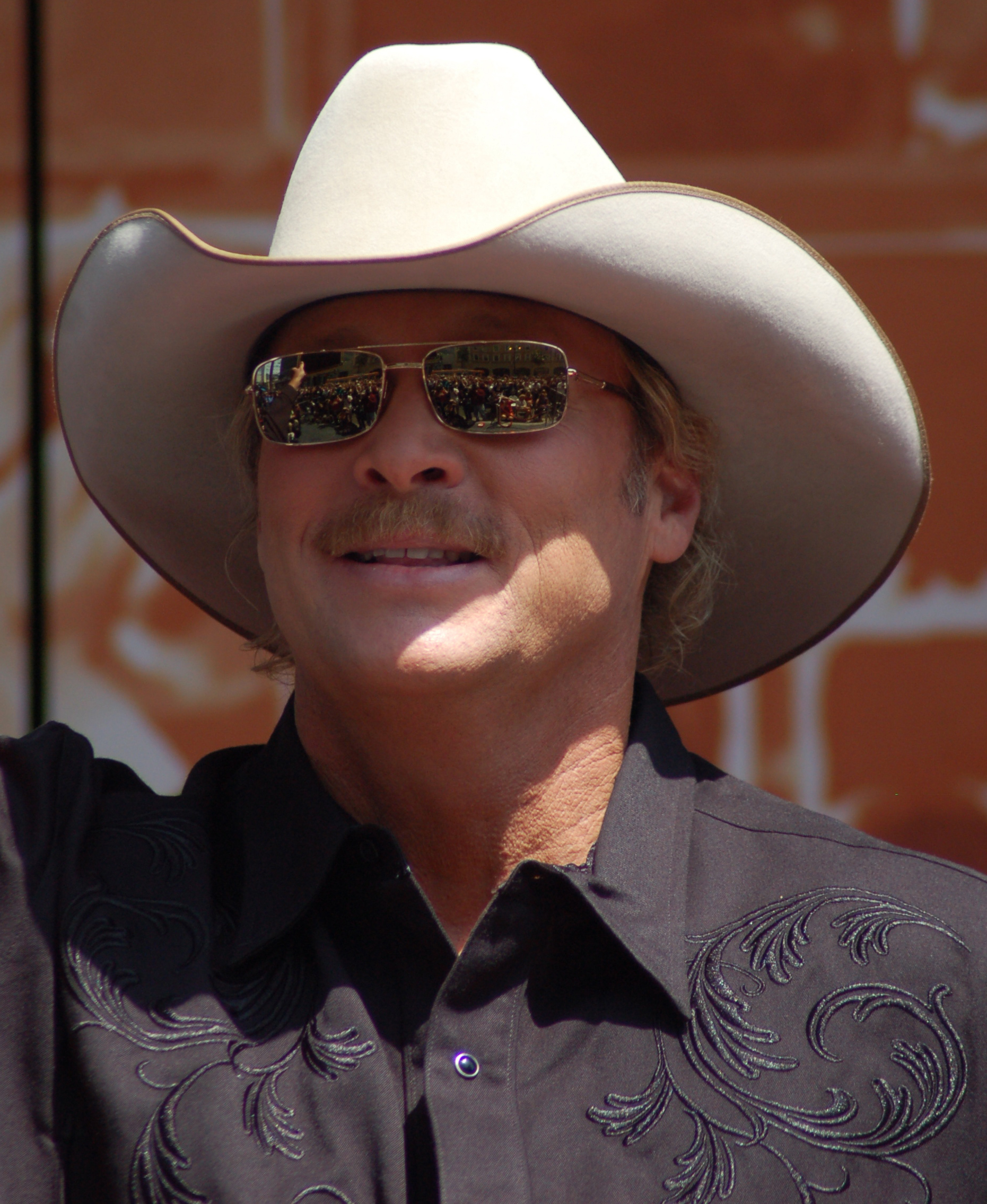
Alan Jackson, inaugural and eponymous recipient of the Alan Jackson Lifetime Achievement Award.

The 60th Academy of Country Music Awards were held on May 8, 2025, at the Ford Center at The Star in Frisco, Texas. Reba McEntire returned as host. The ceremony was streamed live on Amazon Prime Video. Ella Langley lead the nomination with seven, followed by Cody Johnson, Morgan Wallen, and Lainey Wilson with six nominations each. Langley won five awards followed by Wilson with four.

The ceremony had faced cultural and racial controversy regarding Beyoncé's eighth studio album, Cowboy Carter, not being nominated in any category, similar to what happened at the 2024 Country Music Association Awards and despite winning for Best Country Album at the 67th Annual Grammy Awards in February 2025.

== Background ==
On November 2, 2023, the Academy of Country Music announced that it would renew its partnership with Prime Video through 2025. Reba McEntire hosted the ceremony for the eighteenth time. In press releases, ACM started that the ceremony would "celebrate six decades of Country Music and feature unforgettable performances by the genre's most legendary and multi-award-winning stars". Radio personality Bobby Bones conducted candid interviews with artists throughout the show.

First time nominee, Ella Langley, led with seven nominations, including one as a director of her music video, she was followed by Cody Johnson, Morgan Wallen, and Lainey Wilson with six nominations each. Langley would win the most awards of the ceremony with five, two as both an artist of her music video and as a director.

=== Triple Crown Award ===
On May 5, 2025, ACM announced that Keith Urban would be honored with the ACM Triple Crown Award. The honor distinguishes the achievement of an artist, duo or group who have received all of the ACM's three artist awards, the New Artist award, Male/Female Artist or Duo/Group award, and Entertainer of the Year awards.

=== Alan Jackson Lifetime Achievement Award ===
During the ceremony, Reba McEntire surprised the audience with announcement of the inaugural Alan Jackson Lifetime Achievement Award. Along with a special performance by Alan Jackson, the award's eponymous and inaugural honoree. The award will continue to recognize an iconic artist, duo, or group that has achieved both national and international prominence and stature through concert performances, philanthropy, record sales, streaming numbers, and public representation.

== Winners and nominees ==
The nominees were revealed on March 27, 2025. The eligibility period for submissions for the 60th Academy of Country Music Awards ran from January 1, 2024, to December 31, 2024.

Entertainer of the Year	Album of the Year
Lainey Wilson; Kelsea Ballerini; Luke Combs; Cody Johnson; Jelly Roll; Chris Stapleton; Morgan Wallen	Whirlwind — Lainey Wilson; Am I Okay? — Megan Moroney; Beautifully Broken — Jelly Roll; Cold Beer & Country Music — Zach Top; F-1 Trillion — Post Malone
Female Artist of the Year	Male Artist of the Year
Lainey Wilson; Kelsea Ballerini; Ella Langley; Megan Moroney; Kacey Musgraves	Chris Stapleton; Luke Combs; Cody Johnson; Jelly Roll; Morgan Wallen
Group of the Year	Duo of the Year
Old Dominion; Flatland Cavalry; Little Big Town; Rascal Flatts; The Red Clay Strays	Brooks & Dunn; Brothers Osborne; Dan + Shay; Muscadine Bloodline; The War and Treaty
Single of the Year	Song of the Year
"You Look Like You Love Me" — Ella Langley (feat. Riley Green); "A Bar Song (Tipsy)" — Shaboozey; "Dirt Cheap" — Cody Johnson; "I Had Some Help" — Post Malone (feat. Morgan Wallen); "White Horse" — Chris Stapleton	"Dirt Cheap" — Josh Phillips; "4x4xU" — Aaron Raitiere, Jon Decious, Lainey Wilson; "The Architect" — Josh Osborne, Kacey Musgraves, Shane McAnally; "I Had Some Help" — Ashley Gorley, Chandler Paul Walters, Ernest, Jonathan Hoskins, Louis Bell, Morgan Wallen, Ryan Vojtesak, Post Malone; "You Look Like You Love Me" — Aaron Raitiere, Ella Langley, Riley Green
New Female Artist of the Year	New Male Artist of the Year
Ella Langley; Kassi Ashton; Ashley Cooke; Dasha; Jessie Murph	Zach Top; Gavin Adcock; Shaboozey; Tucker Wetmore; Bailey Zimmerman
New Duo/Group of the Year	Artist-Songwriter of the Year
The Red Clay Strays; Restless Road; Treaty Oak Revival	Lainey Wilson; Luke Combs; Ernest; Hardy; Morgan Wallen
Songwriter of the Year	Visual Media of the Year
Jessie Jo Dillon; Jessi Alexander; Ashley Gorley; Chase McGill; Josh Osborne	"You Look Like You Love Me" — Ella Langley (feat. Riley Green); Dir. Wales Toney, John Park, Ella Langley; "4x4xU" — Lainey Wilson; Dir. Dano Cerny; "Dirt Cheap" — Cody Johnson; Dir. Dustin Haney; "I'm Gonna Love You" — Cody Johnson (feat. Carrie Underwood); Dir. Dustin Haney; "Think I'm in Love with You" — Chris Stapleton; Dir. Stephen Kinigopoulos, Alexa Stone
Music Event of the Year
"You Look Like You Love Me" — Ella Langley (feat. Riley Green); "Cowboys Cry Too" — Kelsea Ballerini (feat. Noah Kahan); "I Had Some Help" — Post Malone (feat. Morgan Wallen); "I'm Gonna Love You" — Cody Johnson (feat. Carrie Underwood); "We Don't Fight Anymore" — Carly Pearce (feat. Chris Stapleton)

=== Special awards ===
Alan Jackson Lifetime Achievement Award	Triple Crown Award
Alan Jackson	Keith Urban

== Performers ==
Performer(s)	Song
Reba McEntire; Clint Black; Wynonna Judd; LeAnn Rimes; Little Big Town; Dan + Shay	Songs of the Decades Medley "Okie From Muskogee" "Rhinestone Cowboy" "Why Not Me" "Blue" "Girl Crush" "Tequila"
Eric Church	"Hands of Time"
Miranda Lambert; Ella Langley	"Run" "Kerosene"
Zach Top	"Use Me"
Blake Shelton	"Texas"
Lainey Wilson	"Whirlwind"
Kelsea Ballerini	"Baggage"
Chris Stapleton	"It Takes a Woman"
Ella Langley	"Weren't for the Wind"
Alan Jackson	Alan Jackson Lifetime Achievement Award "Remember When"
Jelly Roll; Shaboozey	"Heart of Stone" "Amen"
Megan Moroney; Chris Stapleton; Brothers Osborne; Keith Urban	Honoring Triple Crown Award winner Keith Urban "Stupid Boy" "Blue Ain't Your Color" "Where the Blacktop Ends"
Cody Johnson; Brooks & Dunn	"The Fall" "Red Dirt Road"
Reba McEntire; Miranda Lambert; Lainey Wilson	"Trailblazer"
Rascal Flatts; Backstreet Boys	"What Hurts the Most" "I Dare You" "Larger than Life" "Life Is a Highway"

== Presenters ==
- Lionel Richie – presented Song of the Year
- Riley Green – introduced New Male Artist of the Year, Zach Top
- The Oak Ridge Boys – presented Group of the Year
- Clint Black – presented Male Artist of the Year
- Kristian Bush of Sugarland – presented Duo of the Year
- Gabby Barrett – introduced New Female Artist of the Year, Ella Langley
- Reba McEntire – presented Single of the Year and the Alan Jackson Lifetime Achievement Award to Alan Jackson
- Carly Pearce – recognized ACM Lifting Lives and St. Jude's Children's Research Hospital
- Martina McBride, Gretchen Wilson, Sara Evans, Crystal Gayle, and Wynonna Judd – presented Female Artist of the Year
- Ernest – introduced Jelly Roll and Shaboozey
- Amber Anderson and Kelly Sutton – recognized Dasha as Amazon Music's "Breakthrough Artist"
- Little Big Town – presented Album of the Year
- Jordan Davis and Chase Elliott – introduced Cody Johnson
- Lee Ann Womack and Parker McCollum – presented Musical Event of the Year
- Rita Wilson – introduced Reba McEntire, Miranda Lambert and Lainey Wilson
- Blake Shelton – presented Entertainer of the Year

== Milestones ==
- Ella Langley received the most nominations of any artist in their first year of being nominated with seven total. Langley also holds the record for most wins for any artist in their first year of being nominated with five.
- Kelsea Ballerini received her first nomination for Entertainer of the Year.
- Lainey Wilson's win for Entertainer of the Year marked her second consecutive year winning the award, making her the third woman to win the award consecutively, following Taylor Swift in 2011 and 2012, and Carrie Underwood in 2009 and 2010. With her additional wins for Female Artist of the Year and Album of the Year, Wilson became the second woman in history to win all three awards in the same ceremony, following Loretta Lynn who did the same in 1976.
- Brooks & Dunn won Duo of the Year for the first time since 2009. Increasing their win count to a record seventeenth win in the category; increasing their own record and bringing their ACM Award count to thirty-one.

== Controversty ==
Despite winning the Grammy Award for Best Contemporary Country Album at the 67th Annual Grammy Awards on February 2, 2025, Beyoncé and her eighth studio album Cowboy Carter, as well as the lead single "Texas Hold 'Em", did not receive any nominations from the Academy of Country Music when the nominations were announced on March 27, 2026. Several publications attributed this to conservatism and racism against Black artists in the country music industry, correlating it with the similar decision made by the organizers of the 58th Annual Country Music Association Awards.

In a interview for Billboard, Academy of Country Music CEO Damon Whiteside addressed the snub "Were we hoping she’d be nominated? Absolutely, [...] We love that Beyoncé is in the country genre. That’s fantastic for all the country artists out there. [...] I think, more likely, ACM voters're going to be voting for artists that they’ve got relationships with and work with on a regular basis and that are in the country music business 365. We’d love to have Beyoncé on the show. She has an open invitation to be on the ACM stage anytime she ever wants to". However The Hollywood Reporter's Carly Thomas pointed out that the artist Post Malone, whose previous five albums featured hip-hop and R&B music generes, received four nominations at the awards ceremony for his first country album, F-1 Trillion.
