= Academy of Country Music Award for Male Artist of the Year =

Annual US country music award

- Country: United States
- Presented by: Academy of Country Music
- First award: 1966
- Currently held by: Cody Johnson (61st)

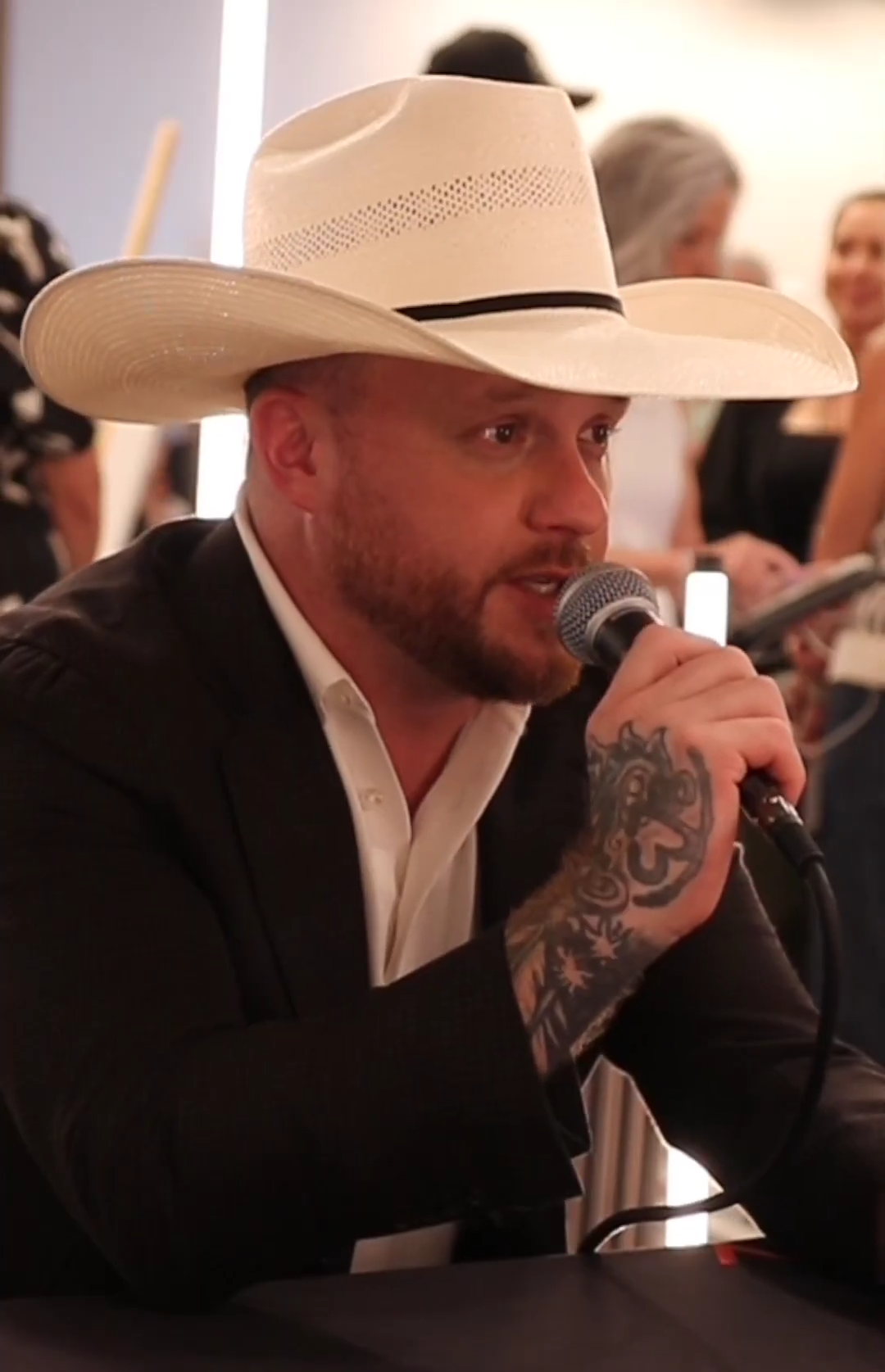
Cody Johnson, the reigning winner of Male Artist of the Year, 2026.

This article lists the winners and nominees for the Academy of Country Music's Male Artist of the Year. The award was first given in 1966, entitled Top Male Vocalist. The following is the list of winners, with the year representing the nominated work.

== Winners and nominees ==
Year	Winner	Nominees
2026	Cody Johnson	Luke Combs; Riley Green; Chris Stapleton; Zach Top
2025	Chris Stapleton	Luke Combs; Cody Johnson; Jelly Roll; Morgan Wallen
2024	Chris Stapleton	Luke Combs; Jelly Roll; Cody Johnson; Morgan Wallen
2023	Morgan Wallen	Kane Brown; Luke Combs; Jordan Davis; Chris Stapleton
2022	Chris Stapleton	Jimmie Allen; Luke Combs; Thomas Rhett; Morgan Wallen
2021	Thomas Rhett	Dierks Bentley; Eric Church; Luke Combs; Chris Stapleton
2020	Luke Combs	Dierks Bentley; Thomas Rhett; Chris Stapleton; Keith Urban
2019	Thomas Rhett	Dierks Bentley; Luke Combs; Chris Stapleton; Keith Urban
2018	Chris Stapleton	Jason Aldean; Thomas Rhett; Keith Urban; Chris Young
2017	Thomas Rhett	Jason Aldean; Dierks Bentley; Chris Stapleton; Keith Urban
2016	Chris Stapleton	Jason Aldean; Dierks Bentley; Eric Church; Brett Eldredge
2015	Jason Aldean	Dierks Bentley; Luke Bryan; Brad Paisley; Blake Shelton
2014	Jason Aldean	Lee Brice; Luke Bryan; Blake Shelton; Keith Urban
2013	Jason Aldean	Luke Bryan; Eric Church; Blake Shelton; Toby Keith
2012	Blake Shelton	Jason Aldean; Kenny Chesney; Brad Paisley; Chris Young
2011	Brad Paisley	Jason Aldean; Blake Shelton; George Strait; Keith Urban
2010	Brad Paisley	Kenny Chesney; Darius Rucker; George Strait; Keith Urban
2009	Brad Paisley	Kenny Chesney; Toby Keith; George Strait; Keith Urban
2008	Brad Paisley	Rodney Atkins; Kenny Chesney; George Strait; Keith Urban
2007	Brad Paisley	Kenny Chesney; Toby Keith; George Strait; Keith Urban
2006	Keith Urban	Dierks Bentley; Kenny Chesney; Brad Paisley; George Strait
2005	Keith Urban	Kenny Chesney; Alan Jackson; Toby Keith; Tim McGraw
2004	Toby Keith	Kenny Chesney; Alan Jackson; Tim McGraw; Keith Urban
2003	Kenny Chesney	Alan Jackson; Toby Keith; Tim McGraw; George Strait
2002	Alan Jackson	Kenny Chesney; Toby Keith; Tim McGraw; Travis Tritt
2001	Toby Keith	Kenny Chesney; Tim McGraw; Brad Paisley; George Strait
2000	Tim McGraw	Alan Jackson; Toby Keith; Collin Raye; George Strait
1999	Tim McGraw	Garth Brooks; Vince Gill; Collin Raye; George Strait
1998	George Strait	Alan Jackson; Tim McGraw; Collin Raye; Bryan White
1997	George Strait	Vince Gill; Alan Jackson; Collin Raye; Bryan White
1996	Alan Jackson	John Berry; Vince Gill; Tim McGraw; George Strait
1995	Alan Jackson	Garth Brooks; Joe Diffie; Vince Gill; George Strait
1994	Vince Gill	Clint Black; Garth Brooks; Billy Ray Cyrus; Alan Jackson
1993	Vince Gill	Garth Brooks; Billy Dean; Alan Jackson; Doug Stone
1992	Garth Brooks	Clint Black; Vince Gill; Alan Jackson; Doug Stone
1991	Garth Brooks	Clint Black; Vince Gill; George Strait; Ricky Van Shelton
1990	Clint Black	Rodney Crowell; George Strait; Randy Travis; Ricky Van Shelton
1989	George Strait	Randy Travis; Ricky Van Shelton; Hank Williams Jr.; Dwight Yoakam
1988	Randy Travis	Ronnie Milsap; George Strait; Steve Wariner; Hank Williams Jr.
1987	Randy Travis	Earl Thomas Conley; George Strait; George Jones; Hank Williams Jr.
1986	George Strait	Earl Thomas Conley; Gary Morris; Ricky Skaggs; Hank Williams Jr.
1985	George Strait	Lee Greenwood; Gary Morris; Kenny Rogers; Ricky Skaggs
1984	Lee Greenwood	John Anderson; Earl Thomas Conley; Merle Haggard; Ricky Skaggs
1983	Ronnie Milsap	Merle Haggard; Willie Nelson; Ricky Skaggs; Hank Williams Jr.
1982	Merle Haggard	Ronnie Milsap; George Jones; Kenny Rogers; Hank Williams Jr.
1981	George Jones	Ronnie Milsap; Eddie Rabbitt; Kenny Rogers; Don Williams
1980	Larry Gatlin	Moe Bandy; Waylon Jennings; Kenny Rogers; Don Williams
1979	Kenny Rogers	Larry Gatlin; Merle Haggard; Eddie Rabbitt; Don Williams
1978	Kenny Rogers	Mickey Gilley; Ronnie Milsap; Mel Tillis; Conway Twitty
1977	Mickey Gilley	Tom Bresh; Marty Robbins; Mel Tillis; Conway Twitty
1976	Conway Twitty	Glen Campbell; Mickey Gilley; Merle Haggard; Willie Nelson
1975	Merle Haggard	John Denver; Ronnie Milsap; Cal Smith; Conway Twitty
1974	Charlie Rich	Merle Haggard; Marty Robbins; Johnny Rodriguez; Conway Twitty
1973	Merle Haggard	Tony Booth; Freddie Hart; Ray Price; Charley Pride; Conway Twitty
1972	Freddie Hart	Merle Haggard; Charley Pride; Marty Robbins; Conway Twitty
1971	Merle Haggard	Glen Campbell; Ray Price; Charley Pride; Marty Robbins
1970	Merle Haggard	Glen Campbell; Johnny Cash; Billy Mize; Charley Pride
1969	Glen Campbell	Merle Haggard; Roger Miller; Billy Mize; Jerry Wallace
1968	Glen Campbell	Merle Haggard; Dean Martin; Billy Mize; Buck Owens
1967	Merle Haggard	Buck Owens; Glen Campbell; Roger Miller; Tex Williams; Wynn Stewart
1966	Buck Owens	Glen Campbell; Johnny Cash; Freddie Hart; Roger Miller; Jerry Wallace

== Category records ==
=== Wins ===
- Most wins — Merle Haggard (6).
  - Most wins from the 1960s — Glen Campbell (2).
  - Most wins from the 1970s — Merle Haggard (4).
  - Most wins from the 1980s — George Strait (3).
  - Most wins from the 1990s — Garth Brooks, Vince Gill, Alan Jackson, George Strait (2).
  - Most wins from the 2000s — Brad Paisley (3).
  - Most wins from the 2010s — Jason Aldean (3).
  - Most wins from the 2020s — Chris Stapleton (3).

=== Nominations ===
- Most nominated — George Strait (21).
  - Most nominated from the 1960s — Glen Campbell (4).
  - Most nominated from the 1970s — Merle Haggard (8).
  - Most nominated from the 1980s — Hank Williams Jr. (6)
  - Most nominated from the 1990s — Vince Gill (8).
  - Most nominated from the 2000s — Kenny Chesney (9).
  - Most nominated from the 2010s — Jason Aldean (8).
  - Most nominated from the 2020s — Luke Combs (7), Chris Stapleton (7).
