= I Never Lie =

2024 song by Zach Top

Single by Zach Top

from the album Cold Beer & Country Music
- Released: November 25, 2024
- Genre: Neotraditional country
- Length: 3:45
- Label: Leo33
- Songwriters: Carson Chamberlain; Tim Nichols; Zach Top
- Producer: Carson Chamberlain

Zach Top singles chronology
"Sounds Like the Radio" (2024)	"I Never Lie" (2024)	"Good Times & Tan Lines" (2025)

Music video
- "I Never Lie" on YouTube

"I Never Lie" is a song by American country music singer Zach Top from his debut studio album Cold Beer & Country Music. Top co-wrote the song with Carson Chamberlain and Tim Nichols, and was produced by Chamberlain. The song notably went viral on social media platform TikTok, which led to it being released as the album's second single.

== Musical style and composition ==
"I Never Lie" is influenced by the neotraditional country style of country music popularized in the 1980s and 1990s. Its comedic lyricism has been compared to George Strait's "Ocean Front Property" on the 1987 album of the same name.

== Critical reception ==
Country Central writer Will Chapman wrote that the song "as well as a classic voice, Zach Top has plenty of personality, and just like the greats he seeks to follow in the footsteps of, he puts a high premium on witty lyrics". Taste of Country placed it at number 17 on its list of the Top 40 Country Songs of 2024.

== Live performances ==
Top performed "I Never Lie" on The Tonight Show Starring Jimmy Fallon on April 30, 2025.

== Chart performance ==
The song debuted at number 95 on the Billboard Hot 100 the week of September 28, 2024, and became Top's first entry on the chart. It debuted at number 45 on Billboard Hot Country Songs. In May 2025, it reached a peak of number two on the Billboard Country Airplay chart, and became Top's first number-one hit on the Canada Country chart.

== Charts ==
=== Weekly charts ===
Weekly chart performance for "I Never Lie"
Chart (2024–2025)	Peak position
Australia Country Hot 50 (The Music)	1
Canada Hot 100 (Billboard)	36
Canada All-Format Airplay (Billboard)	3
Canada Country (Billboard)	1
US Billboard Hot 100	24
US Country Airplay (Billboard)	2
US Hot Country Songs (Billboard)	6

=== Year-end charts ===
Year-end chart performance for "I Never Lie"
Chart (2025)	Position
Canada (Canadian Hot 100)	63
Canada Country (Billboard)	18
US Billboard Hot 100	43
US Country Airplay (Billboard)	17
US Hot Country Songs (Billboard)	10

== Certifications ==
Certifications for "I Never Lie"
Region	Certification	Certified units/sales
Canada (Music Canada)	4× Platinum	320,000^{‡}
New Zealand (RMNZ)	Gold	15,000^{‡}
United States (RIAA)	4× Platinum	4,000,000^{‡}
^{‡} Sales+streaming figures based on certification alone.
