= Zach Top =

American singer-songwriter (born 1997)

- Top in 2025

Background information
- Born: Zachary Dirk Top; September 26, 1997 (age 29); Sunnyside, Washington, U.S.
- Genres: Neotraditional country; bluegrass (early work)
- Occupations: Singer; songwriter; musician
- Instruments: Vocals; guitar
- Years active: 2019–present
- Label: Leo33
- Website: zachtop.com

Zachary Dirk Top (born September 26, 1997) is an American country music singer, songwriter, and musician. Born in Sunnyside, Washington, he began his musical career in 2019 and signed to record label Leo33 in 2023. Top has released two albums for the label: Cold Beer & Country Music (2024) and Ain't in It for My Health (2025). Several of his singles have charted on the Billboard Hot Country Songs and Country Airplay charts, and "I Never Lie" also reached the Hot 100. Top is known for a neotraditional country sound similar to 1990s-era country artists which has received largely favorable reception alongside some criticism that it is derivative. He won the Academy of Country Music Award for New Male Artist of the Year in 2025 and the Country Music Association Award for New Artist of the Year later that year. In 2026, Ain't in It for My Health won the inaugural Grammy Award for Best Traditional Country Album.

== Life and career ==
Zachary Dirk Top was born on September 26, 1997, and grew up on a farm in Sunnyside, Washington. Top began guitar lessons aged 5 and at the age of 7 he began performing in a bluegrass band with his siblings named Top String. His family relocated to Pasco when Top was around 10.

Top moved to Boulder, Colorado, in 2015 to study mechanical engineering at the University of Colorado Boulder. He left after a year, saying he had lost interest, and worked to save money to move to Nashville, Tennessee. Through his teens and early twenties he played in various bluegrass music bands, one of which, titled Mashtag then retitled Modern Tradition, won the 2017 International Bluegrass Band Championships in Nashville. After releasing a string of bluegrass singles in 2019 Top settled in Nashville in 2021. His self-titled extended play (EP) followed on May 13, 2022, with RBR Entertainment.

In September 2023, Top signed with the independent record label Leo33. His debut single to country radio, "Sounds Like the Radio", was released on January 8, 2024, and was the most-added song at the format with 55 stations adding the song after release. It has since charted in the top 20 of the Billboard Country Airplay chart. Top co-wrote "Sounds Like the Radio" with Carson Chamberlain and Wyatt McCubbin, inspired by his love of 1990s-era country music. It served as the lead single to Top's debut studio album, Cold Beer & Country Music, which was released on April 5, 2024. The album received widespread critical acclaim on release. The Tennessean praised it as full of "star-making tunes", while Country Central called it "a masterclass in traditional country music", adding that "with a record this strong, Zach Top has proven himself as a standout rising star in this format and a premier vocalist in country music." Top released Me & Billy, a three-track EP with Billy Strings featuring reimagined versions of Top's songs "Bad Luck" and "Things to Do", along with a cover of Ricky Skaggs's "Don't Cheat in Our Home Town". The EP was first released as an Apple Music exclusive in October 2024, before becoming widely available on 28 February 2025.

Top's second studio album, Ain't in It for My Health, was released on August 29, 2025. It was preceded by the release of "Good Times & Tan Lines" on June 9. The album was well-received by Rolling Stone's Daniel Kohn wrote that Top "holds his own with the country greats", adding that his "vocals soar with the confidence of a seasoned storyteller", and that the album "brings to mind legends like George Strait and Alan Jackson." Pitchfork's Millan Verma described it as "good, clean country fun, full of clear-eyed comedic writing and tight arrangements". The album debuted at number one on Billboard's Top Current Country Albums chart and number 11 on the Billboard 200, earning more than 30 million global streams in its first week of release. Top performed on The Tonight Show Starring Jimmy Fallon in 2026.

== Musical style ==
Top is known for his neotraditional country sound, drawing heavily on 1990s-era country artists such as George Strait, Keith Whitley and Randy Travis, as well as Marty Robbins. His musical roots lie in bluegrass, having formed a family band, Top String, with his siblings at age seven. Both of Top's studio albums were produced by Carson Chamberlain, a former bandleader for Whitley who has written for Strait and Alan Jackson. Writing in The New York Times, Jon Caramanica observed that "Top's commitment to form remains immaculate: a high-wire routine so aesthetically faithful and brimming with theatrical mirth that he's almost winking, merging a sense of history and a sense of play."

Some listeners have criticized Top's sound as derivative. A 2024 Country Central piece reported that critics of Cold Beer & Country Music called its songs "recycled" and unoriginal, saying they had heard them before, while the writer argued that Top was telling his own stories through the 1990s country sound he grew up with.

== Public image and personal life ==
In May 2026, clips from Top's appearance on Bert Kreischer’s podcast circulated online. In them, Top described sobriety as a "fad, trendy thing" and criticized people who publicize it. The comments drew mixed reactions, with some listeners saying the comments downplayed the struggles of people with alcohol addiction, while others saying Top was promoting a healthy balance and responsible alcohol consumption, and that the clips were taken out of context. Saving Country Music said that the comments were inconsiderate and uninformed, but that Top did not deserve to be canceled over the incident.

Top is in a relationship with model and social media influencer Amelia Taylor, from Grenada, Mississippi. The couple made their relationship public in November 2024, and made their red carpet debut together weeks later at the 58th Country Music Association Awards. The pair have since continued to appear together publicly, including at the 60th Academy of Country Music Awards and the 2025 CMA Awards.

== Discography ==
=== Studio albums ===
List of studio albums, with selected details, chart positions and sales
Title	Album details	Peak chart positions				Certification
Title	Album details	US	US Country	US Indie	CAN	Certification
Cold Beer & Country Music	Release date: April 5, 2024; Label: Leo33; Formats: CD, vinyl, digital download	31	4	5	67	RIAA: Platinum
Ain't in It for My Health	Release date: August 29, 2025; Label: Leo33; Formats: CD, vinyl, digital download	11	4	2	44	

=== EPs ===
List of EPs, with selected details
Title	EP details
Zach Top	Release date: May 13, 2022; Label: RBR Entertainment; Formats: CD, digital download
Me & Billy	Release date: October 2024 (Apple Music); 28 February 2025 (full release); Label: Leo33; Format: digital download; Tracks: "Bad Luck", "Things to Do", "Don't Cheat in Our Home Town" (originally by Ricky Skaggs); Featured artist: Billy Strings
Good Girls & Cowgirls	Release date: August 21, 2026; Label: Leo33; Formats: digital download, vinyl; Tracks: "Good Girls & Cowgirls", "Other Side of Hurtin'"

=== Singles ===
List of singles, with selected chart positions
Title	Year	Peak chart positions					Certifications	Album
Title	Year	US	US Country	US Country Airplay	CAN	CAN Country	Certifications	Album
"Sounds Like the Radio"	2024	— (Note: "Sounds Like the Radio" did not enter the Billboard Hot 100, but peaked at number five on the Bubbling Under Hot 100 chart.)	29	15	97	7	RIAA: Platinum; MC: Platinum	Cold Beer & Country Music
"I Never Lie"	2024	24	6	2	36	1	RIAA: 4× Platinum; MC: 4× Platinum; RMNZ: Gold	Cold Beer & Country Music
"Good Times & Tan Lines"	2025	75	19	12	100	6	MC: Gold	Ain't in It for My Health
"South of Sanity"	2025	63	21	12	70	22	RIAA: Gold; MC: Gold	Ain't in It for My Health

=== Promotional singles ===
List of promotional singles, with selected chart positions
Title	Year	Peak chart positions		Certifications	Album
Title	Year	US Country	US Country Airplay	Certifications	Album
"In a World Gone Wrong"	2019	—	—		Zach Top
"I Don't Mind"	2021	—	—		Zach Top
"Like It Ain't No Thing"	2022	—	—		Zach Top
"Cold Beer & Country Music"	2022	—	—	RIAA: Gold; MC: Gold	Cold Beer & Country Music
"There's the Sun"	2022	—	—	RIAA: Gold	Cold Beer & Country Music
"Bad Luck"	2022	38	—	RIAA: Platinum; MC: Platinum	Cold Beer & Country Music
"Busy Doin' Nothin'"	2023	—	—		Non-album single
"The Kinda Woman I Like"	2023	—	—		Cold Beer & Country Music
"Justa Jonesin'"	2023	—	—		Non-album single
"Use Me"	2024	37	51	RIAA: Platinum; MC: Gold	Cold Beer & Country Music
"Beer for Breakfast"	2024	—	—		Non-album single
"Good Girls & Cowgirls"	2026	50	—		Good Girls & Cowgirls

=== Other charted songs ===
List of other charted songs, with selected chart positions
Title	Year	Peak chart positions			Certifications	Album
Title	Year	US Country	US Country Airplay	CAN Country	Certifications	Album
"Lonely for Long"	2024	—	—	—	RIAA: Gold	Cold Beer & Country Music
"When You See Me"	2025	47	—	—		Ain't in It for My Health
"Blue Christmas"	2025	—	59	47		Non-album song

=== Music videos ===
Year	Title	Director
2023	"There's the Sun"	Citizen Kane Wayne
2023	"Bad Luck"	Citizen Kane Wayne
2024	"Sounds Like the Radio"	Citizen Kane Wayne
2024	"Cold Beer & Country Music"	
2025	"Good Times & Tan Lines"	Citizen Kane Wayne

== Awards and nominations ==
=== Grammy Awards ===
Year	Nominee / work	Award	Result
2026	Ain't in It for My Health	Best Traditional Country Album	Won
2026	"I Never Lie"	Best Country Song	Nominated
2026	"I Never Lie"	Best Country Solo Performance	Nominated

=== American Music Awards ===
Year	Nominee / work	Award	Result
2026	Zach Top	Breakthrough Country Artist	Nominated

=== Academy of Country Music Awards ===
Year	Nominee / work	Award	Result
2025	Zach Top	New Male Artist of the Year	Won
2025	Cold Beer & Country Music	Album of the Year	Nominated
2026	Ain't in It for My Health	Album of the Year	Nominated
2026	"I Never Lie"	Single of the Year	Nominated
2026	"I Never Lie"	Song of the Year	Nominated
2026	Zach Top	Male Artist of the Year	Nominated

=== Country Music Association Awards ===
Year	Nominee / work	Award	Result
2024	Zach Top	New Artist of the Year	Nominated
2025	Zach Top	New Artist of the Year	Won
2025	Zach Top	Male Vocalist of the Year	Nominated
2025	Cold Beer & Country Music	Album of the Year	Nominated
2025	"I Never Lie"	Single of the Year	Nominated
2025	"I Never Lie"	Song of the Year	Nominated
2026	Ain't in It for My Health	Album of the Year	Nominated
2026	Zach Top	Male Vocalist of the Year	Nominated

== Tours ==
Headlining

- Cold Beer & Country Music Tour (2025)
- Cold Beer & Country Music Tour (2026)

Supporting

- Broken Branches Tour (2025) (with Dierks Bentley)
