= Cold Beer & Country Music =

Studio album by Zach Top
- Released: April 5, 2024
- Studios: Sound Stage, Nashville
- Genre: Neotraditional country
- Length: 40:02
- Label: Leo33
- Producer: Carson Chamberlain

Zach Top chronology
Zach Top (2022)	Cold Beer & Country Music (2024)	Ain't in It for My Health (2025)

Singles from Cold Beer & Country Music
- 1. "Sounds Like the Radio" Released: January 8, 2024; 2. "I Never Lie" Released: November 25, 2024

Cold Beer & Country Music is the debut studio album by American country music singer Zach Top. It was released on April 5, 2024, via Leo33. It includes the singles "Sounds Like the Radio" and "I Never Lie".

== Content ==
In September 2023, it was announced that Top was signed as the flagship artist for the newly-formed independent record label Leo33. Cold Beer & Country Music marks his first release under the label, and his first marketed as country music, following years of recording as a bluegrass performer.

Top co-wrote all of the album's 12 tracks with Carson Chamberlain, who also solely produced the album. Top began a working relationship with Chamberlain in 2019, regularly flying to Nashville on a monthly basis to write songs with him and others, including Wyatt McCubbin, Roger Springer, Paul Overstreet, Michael White, Mark Nesler, and Tim Nichols. After five years of songwriting, they put together a cohesive project, with Top saying: "It's just fun to get these songs to finally see the light of day and let people hear what I've been working on for a while. You only get one chance to make that first impression and we wanted to get it right".

Top named the title track, "There's the Sun", and "Cowboys Like Me Do" as some of his favorite songs on the record in an interview with Billboard. In another with American Songwriter, he also cited "Use Me".

== Critical reception ==
Professional ratings
Review scores
Source	Rating
AllMusic	4/5 stars
Holler	9.5/10

In a review for Holler, Soda Canter described the album as finding "Top soaring through an array of diverse and intriguing song selections. It's material that triumphantly succeeds in representing his rural Washington upbringing and natural sentimentality, while propelling his exceptional artistic range front and center", and gave the album a 9.5 out of 10 ranking. Will Chapman of Country Central called the album "a masterclass in traditional country music", praising Top's vocals, the neo-traditional production choices, and the diversity of material from slow jams to honkytonk rockers. Roughstock writer Matt Bjorke praised the singer for his genuine approach to 90s country music and favorably compared him to the likes of Randy Travis, Keith Whitley, and Joe Diffie, citing his background in bluegrass music and unique vocal phrasing as elements that make him a standout in the modern country genre.

== Chart performance ==
Cold Beer & Country Music debuted at number 49 on the Billboard Top Country Albums chart dated August 3, 2024. It has since reached a peak of number 4 on the chart, and reached number 31 on the all-genre Billboard 200.

== Singles ==
"Sounds Like the Radio" was released as Top's debut single to country radio on January 8, 2024, and served as the album's lead single. It became his first top 20 hit on the Billboard Country Airplay chart in November 2024, reaching a peak of number 15. While "Radio" was charting, "I Never Lie" went viral on social media platform TikTok, which led to it being released as the album's second single. It became Top's first entry on the Billboard Hot 100.

== Track listing ==
All tracks are written by Zach Top and Carson Chamberlain, with additional co-writers as noted.

No.	Title	Writer(s)	Length
1.	"Sounds Like the Radio"	Wyatt McCubbin	3:38
2.	"Cold Beer & Country Music"		3:06
3.	"Cowboys Like Me Do"	Roger Springer	2:58
4.	"There's the Sun"	McCubbin	3:25
5.	"Dirt Turns to Gold"	Paul Overstreet	3:10
6.	"The Kinda Woman I Like"	Michael White	2:38
7.	"Lonely for Long"	Mark Nesler	3:36
8.	"Bad Luck"	Nesler	3:19
9.	"Use Me"	Tim Nichols	3:56
10.	"Ain't That a Heartbreak"	Overstreet	3:26
11.	"I Never Lie"	Nichols	3:44
12.	"Things to Do"	Nesler	3:00
Total length:			40:02

== Personnel ==
Credits are adapted from the album's liner notes.

=== Musicians ===
- Zach Top – vocals (all tracks), acoustic guitar (tracks 1–7, 9, 12), background vocals (3–12), electric guitar (4, 8)
- Tommy Harden – drums (all tracks), percussion (5, 9–12)
- Brent Mason – electric guitar (all tracks), tic-tac electric guitar (5)
- Gary Prim – piano (all tracks), keyboards (4)
- Scotty Sanders – steel guitar (1–7, 9–12), Dobro (8)
- Andy Leftwich – fiddle (1–7, 10, 12), acoustic guitar (5, 8, 10, 11)
- Glenn Worf – bass (1, 2, 4, 6–8)
- Paul Brewster – background vocals (1, 2)
- Jimmy Carter – bass (3, 5, 9, 11, 12)

=== Technical ===
- Carson Chamberlain – production
- Matt Rovey – engineering, mixing
- Kam Luchterhand – engineering assistance
- Will Kienzle – engineering assistance
- Ken Love – mastering
- Jeff Huskins – spatial audio engineering
- Jason Campbell – production coordination

=== Visuals ===
- Citizen Kane Wayne – photography, design
- Dusty Cantrell – design assistance

== Charts ==
=== Weekly charts ===
Weekly chart performance for Cold Beer & Country Music
Chart (2024–2026)	Peak position
Australian Country Albums (ARIA)	24
Canadian Albums (Billboard)	67
US Billboard 200	31
US Top Country Albums (Billboard)	4

=== Year-end charts ===
2024 year-end chart performance for Cold Beer & Country Music
Chart (2024)	Position
US Top Country Albums (Billboard)	63

2025 year-end chart performance for Cold Beer & Country Music
Chart (2025)	Position
US Billboard 200	51
US Top Country Albums (Billboard)	10

== Certifications ==
Certifications for "Cold Beer & Country Music"
Region	Certification	Certified units/sales
United States (RIAA)	Platinum	1,000,000^{‡}
^{‡} Sales+streaming figures based on certification alone.

== Accolades ==
Year-end lists
Publication	Rank	List
Billboard	7	The 10 Best Country Albums of 2024
Holler	1	The 25 Best Country Albums of 2024
Rolling Stone	13	The 30 Best Country Albums of 2024
Taste of Country	10	The 10 Best Country Albums of 2024
