= Leo33 =

American record label

- Founded: April 2023
- Founder: Katie Dean; Rachel Fontenot
- Distributors: Firebird Music; Red Light Ventures
- Genre: Country
- Country of origin: United States
- Location: Nashville, Tennessee
- Official website: www.leo33.com

Leo33 is an American independent record label. Founded in 2023 in Nashville, Tennessee, the label is best known for its releases by country singer Zach Top.

== Background ==
The record label was founded in April 2023 by Katie Dean and Rachel Fontenot, two former Universal Music Group Nashville senior executives, and has its headquarters in the Wedgewood-Houston neighborhood of Nashville. The label's core team also includes in-house A&R representatives Daniel Lee and Natalie Osborne, while also utilizing partnerships with global music companies Firebird Music and Red Light Ventures. Its name was inspired by the constellation Leo and the long-playing vinyl format.

It was announced in September 2023 that country artist Zach Top was signed as the label's flagship artist. "Sounds Like the Radio" was released on January 8, 2024, as Top's debut single and the label's first release, and was followed by Top's debut album, Cold Beer & Country Music, on April 5, 2024.

In 2024, the label expanded its roster to include solo country artists Jenna Paulette and Ashland Craft, and Americana and heartland rock band Jason Scott & the High Heat. Leo33 released Paulette's second studio album, Horseback, on September 6, 2024, and her debut country radio single, "The Dirt", was released on April 28, 2025.

In 2025, the label signed Trey Pendley and Clay Street Unit. In 2026, Sela Campbell joined the label roster.

== Current Artists ==
- Sela Campbell
- Clay Street Unit
- Jenna Paulette
- Trey Pendley
- Jason Scott & the High Heat
- Zach Top

== Former Artists ==
- Ashland Craft
