= Neotraditional country =

Style of country music

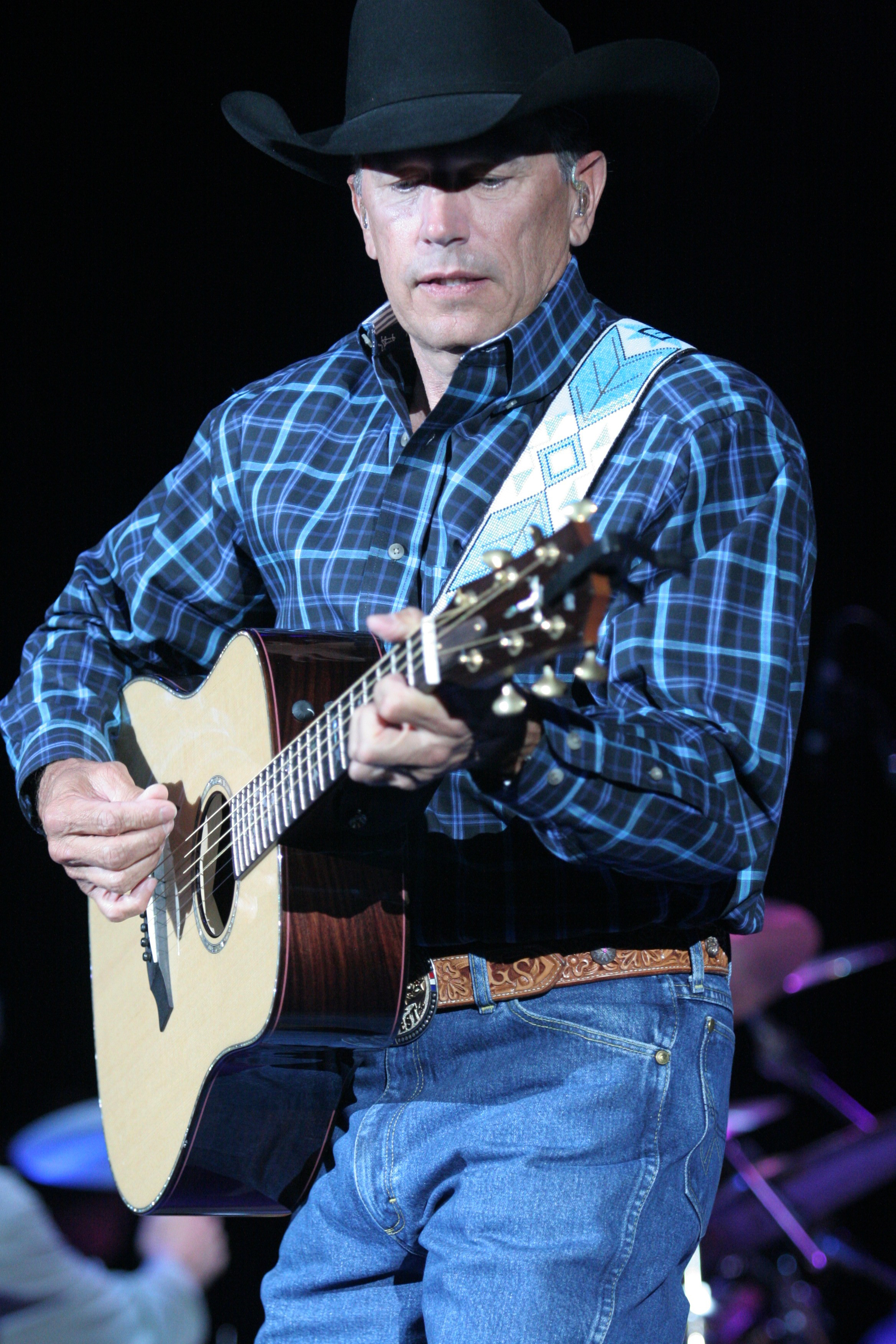
- George Strait, considered the founder of the neotraditional movement, performing in 2008.
- Other names: New traditional country; hardcore country
- Stylistic origins: Western swing; honky-tonk; Bakersfield sound; gospel; rockabilly; bluegrass music; Western
- Cultural origins: Southeastern and Southwestern United States in the late 1970s-early 1980s

Subgenres
- Lubbock sound

Fusion genres
- Americana music; alternative country; country blues; cowpunk

Local scenes
- Tennessee; West Virginia; Kentucky; New Mexico; Texas; Bakersfield, California

Neotraditional country (also known as new traditional country, or hardcore country) is a country music style and subgenre that developed in the 1980s and emphasizes the traditional country instrumental background (i.e. fiddle and pedal steel guitar) and traditional country vocals found in subgenres popularized in the 1940s-60s. Neo-traditional country draws inspiration from styles such as honky-tonk, Western swing, and the Bakersfield sound and performers such as Hank Williams, George Jones, Loretta Lynn, Buck Owens, Tammy Wynette, Kitty Wells, Bob Wills, Ernest Tubb, and Merle Haggard. as well as often dressing in the fashions of the country music scene of the 1940s-1960s.

The neotraditional country movement was ignited by artists George Strait, Ricky Skaggs, and John Anderson in the early 1980s as a reaction to the pop-country and Urban Cowboy scene of the late 1970s and early 1980s, and became popular in the mainstream country scene by the mid-1980s into the mid-1990s with artists such as Randy Travis, Clint Black, Dwight Yoakam, Alan Jackson, Highway 101, Patty Loveless, Kenny Chesney, The Judds, Brooks & Dunn, Mark Chesnutt, Toby Keith, and Keith Whitley. By the mid-to-late 1990s, the neotraditional country movement was overtaken in popularity by "stadium-sized" pop-country performers like Garth Brooks, Shania Twain, Faith Hill, Billy Ray Cyrus, LeAnn Rimes, and Tim McGraw, who integrated aspects of the neotraditional style with the musical and theatrical components of arena rock, adult contemporary music and 1970s-1990s pop music.

Western music performers of neotraditional style music often emphasize their heritage genres – examples include those associated with the late Al Hurricane in New Mexico music, and modern honky-tonk acts such as Zach Top, and bands like Midland and the Turnpike Troubadours in the Texas country music and red dirt scenes.

== History ==
Neotraditional country rose to popularity in the mid-1980s, a few years after the so-called "outlaw movement", a previous "back-to-its-roots" movement, had faded in popularity. Neotraditionalism was born as a reaction to the perceived blandness of the mainstream country music at the time, which had been influenced by the rise of the "urban cowboy" fad. New (or "neo-") traditionalism looked to the elders of country music like Ernest Tubb, Hank Williams, Kitty Wells and George Jones for inspiration, and was a precursor to the more general categorization known as new country. The creation of neotraditionalism was also done in contrast to the more pop-oriented acts of the 1970s and 1980s, such as Ronnie Milsap and Anne Murray, along with the flood of former pop acts (see B.J. Thomas, Billy Joe Royal, The Osmond Brothers, Bill Medley, Dan Seals and Exile) switching to "country" to revive their careers.

In 1981, George Strait had made his musical debut with the album Strait Country. The album was based on an approach towards traditional country music and its subgenres of honky tonk, Western swing, and the Bakersfield sound. The album was considered a sharp contrast to the then current trends of country music, at the time relying on the "urban cowboy" country-pop scene. AllMusic critic Stephen Thomas Erlewine observed:

And that's the genius of Strait Country—it showed how it was possible to be planted firmly in traditional country yet flexible enough to play softer stuff without losing that hardcore stance ... by blending the hardcore honky tonk, Western swing and Bakersfield country with a few melodic ballads that weren't designed for the barroom, he set the template for years and years of modern country.

It is with Strait Country that George Strait is credited with starting the neotraditional movement.

In the early 1980s, Ricky Skaggs, a picking prodigy who took his inspiration from Bill Monroe and Ralph Stanley (Skaggs was a Clinch Mountain Boy as a teen), began making music that he believed brought country back to its roots; Skaggs' style drew heavily on country's bluegrass vein.

Another neotraditional country artist was one of Skaggs' friends and former band-mate, Keith Whitley, who focused largely on countrypolitan ballads. After his success with "Don't Close Your Eyes", Whitley was said to be a promising new artist; however, in 1989, he died of what was officially listed as an alcohol overdose at the age of 34 (this diagnosis has since come into dispute). Despite his death, Whitley's sound remains influential among country artists. At that same time, artists such as Emmylou Harris, John Anderson and Gail Davies, whose hits included re-makes of songs by Ray Price, Webb Pierce, Carl Smith, The Louvin Brothers and Johnnie & Jack, set the tone in the late 1970s and early 1980s. Following that, Randy Travis, Patty Loveless, and The Judds used vintage musical stylings, covers of classic country material, and carefully crafted vocal delivery to help bring neotraditionalism to the vanguard of country music for a time. Some of the last top-10 hits from a number of classic country stars (such as Merle Haggard, Conway Twitty, George Jones, and Don Williams) came during the neotraditional boom of the late 1980s and into 1990.

As the mid-1980s approached, the pop country of the early 1980s was rapidly falling out of popularity as the Second British Invasion and MTV revolution took hold of American pop music, and country music sales overall had fallen to levels not seen since disco. The promotion of traditional country sounds was in part a retrenchment to appeal to the base of country music fans who remained loyal to the genre.

1986 in particular was a seminal year, as Randy Travis and Dwight Yoakam released their critically-acclaimed debut albums, marking a sea-change from urban cowboy to neotraditional country. Artists such as Holly Dunn, Clint Black, Ricky Van Shelton, Lyle Lovett, and Highway 101 soon followed as neotraditionalists stormed the country charts in the late 1980s.

Neotraditionalism, to a certain extent, fell out of favor in approximately 1991, when Billboard removed record sales from its country chart and a new brand of popular country music exploded into mainstream popularity, led in large part by Garth Brooks, Toby Keith, and Reba McEntire (who merged neotraditionalist styles, with stadium rock-influences). Despite this shift, of the acts that were still popular in the 1980s, more of the neotraditional artists survived the shift into the 1990s than did those who did pop country in the 1980s tradition; Travis, Keith, Strait, McEntire, Loveless and newcomer Alan Jackson stayed true to the neotraditional sound and continued to have mainstream success alongside their newer, more pop-oriented rivals.

In 2000, Strait and Jackson, both of whom remain popular as of the early 2020s, recorded a song titled "Murder on Music Row" which spoke directly to the rift between neotraditionalists and pop-country musicians. The lyrics include scathing criticisms of the Nashville establishment such as "Someone killed tradition, and for that, someone should hang." Strait revisited the topic in his 2016 song "Kicked Outta Country", which noted that history was repeating itself at the time as artists like Strait were being marginalized just like artists such as Merle Haggard and George Jones had been in 1991. Jackson made similar remarks in his own song "Where Have You Gone", released at the same time as Strait's, remarking in an interview that he hoped that younger country musicians would embrace the traditional sound because as it stood, "country music is gone and it's not coming back."
