= List of awards and nominations received by Chris Stapleton =

Chris Stapleton awards and nominations
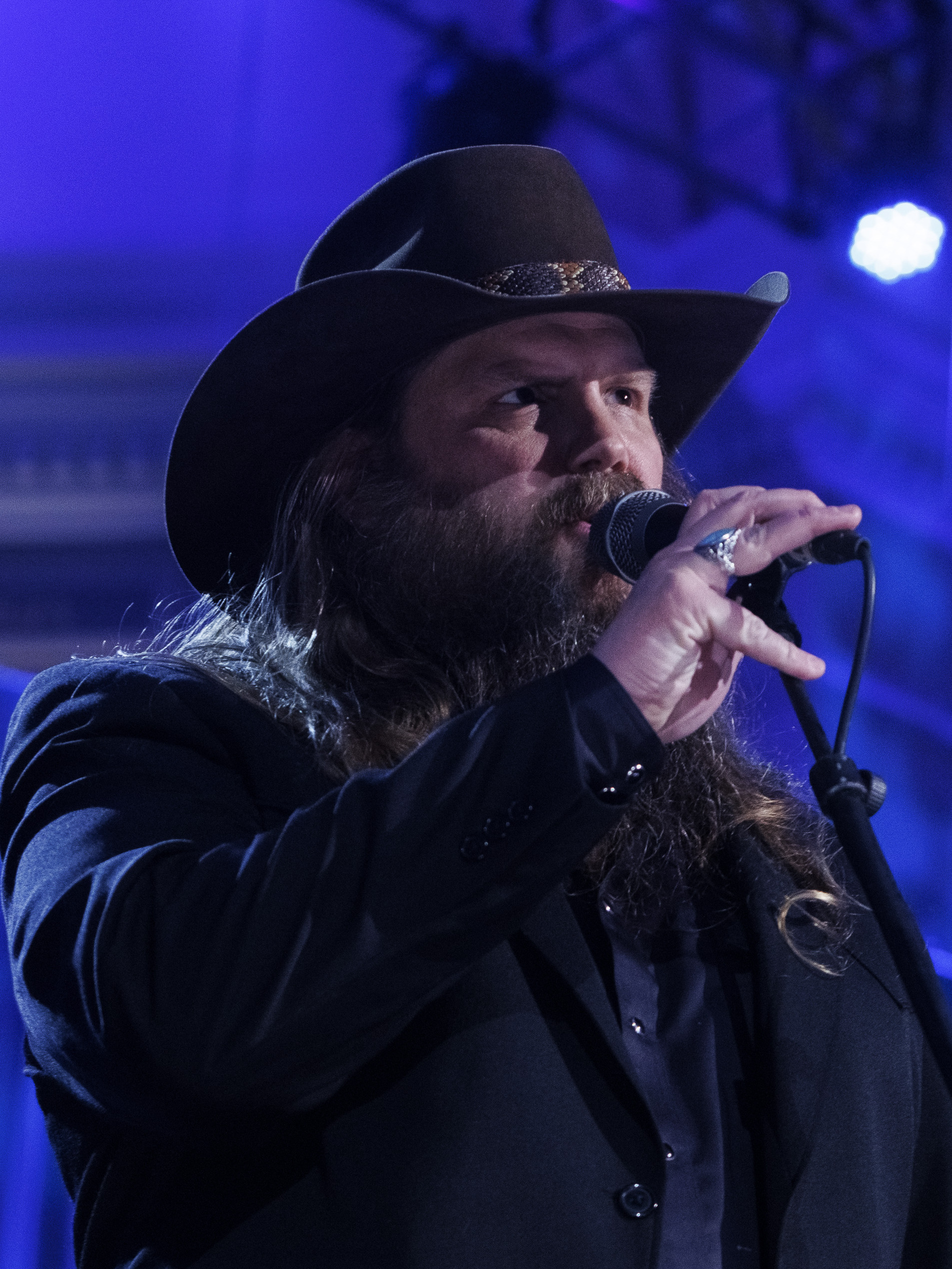
- Stapleton in 2022
Awards and nominations
Award	Wins	Nominations
American Music Awards	0	7
Billboard	5	18
CMT	2	11
Grammy	12	26
MTV VMA	0	2
ACM	16	45
CMA	16	38
iHeartRadio	2	4
People's Choice Country Awards	1	5

Totals (Note: Certain award groups do not simply award one winner. They acknowledge several different recipients, have runners-up, and have third place. Since this is a specific recognition and is different from losing an award, runner-up mentions are considered wins in this award tally. For simplification and to avoid errors, each award in this list has been presumed to have had a prior nomination.)
- Wins: 80
- Nominations: 170 (Note: Awards in certain categories do not have prior nominations and only winners are announced by the jury. For simplification and to avoid errors, each award in this list has been presumed to have had a prior nomination.)

American singer-songwriter Chris Stapleton has received multiple awards and nominations. He is the recipient of twelve Grammy Awards, eleven Academy of Country Music Awards, fifteen Country Music Association Awards, five Billboard Music Award, among others.

During his career he has published five studio albums, three of which, Traveller (2015), From A Room: Volume 1 (2017) and Starting Over (2021), were recognized by both the ACM Award for Album of the Year, the CMA Award for Album of the Year and the Grammy Award for Best Country Album.

For his songwriting works, Stapleton was honored with the ASCAP Vanguard Award (2015) and the ACMusic Award for Songwriter of the Decade (2019) and Triple Crown Award (2023). He was also recognized with three CMT Honoree.

As a member of The SteelDrivers he received three Grammy Awards nominations and as a songwriter for other artist he won eightASCAP Country Awards. Stapleton also collaborated with several pop artists, including on "Say Something" with Justin Timberlake, receiving his first nomination at the MTV Video Music Awards, "I Bet You Think About Me" with Taylor Swift, and "Just Say I'm Sorry" with Pink, winning his first People's Choice Country Awards.

== Awards and nominations ==
Award	Year	Work	Category	Result	Ref.
American Country Countdown Awards	2016	Traveller	Top Country Album	Won	
Academy of Country Music Awards	2016	Traveller	Album of the Year	Won	
Academy of Country Music Awards	2016	"Nobody to Blame"	Song of the Year	Won	
Academy of Country Music Awards	2016	Chris Stapleton	Songwriter of the Year	Won	
Academy of Country Music Awards	2016	Chris Stapleton	New Male Vocalist of the Year	Won	
Academy of Country Music Awards	2016	Chris Stapleton	Male Vocalist of the Year	Won	
Academy of Country Music Awards	2016	"Hangover Tonight" (with Gary Allan)	Vocal Event of the Year	Nominated	
Academy of Country Music Awards	2017	Chris Stapleton	Male Vocalist of the Year	Nominated	
Academy of Country Music Awards	2017	"Tennessee Whiskey"	Song of the Year	Nominated	
Academy of Country Music Awards	2017	"Fire Away"	Video of the Year	Nominated	
Academy of Country Music Awards	2018	Chris Stapleton	Entertainer of the Year	Nominated	
Academy of Country Music Awards	2018	Chris Stapleton	Male Vocalist of the Year	Won	
Academy of Country Music Awards	2018	From A Room: Volume 1	Album of the Year	Won	
Academy of Country Music Awards	2018	"Broken Halos"	Single Record of the Year	Nominated	
Academy of Country Music Awards	2018	"Whiskey and You"	Song of the Year	Nominated	
Academy of Country Music Awards	2019	Chris Stapleton	Songwriter of the Decade	Won	
Academy of Country Music Awards	2019	Chris Stapleton	Entertainer of the Year	Nominated	
Academy of Country Music Awards	2019	Chris Stapleton	Male Vocalist of the Year	Nominated	
Academy of Country Music Awards	2019	From A Room: Volume 2	Album of the Year	Nominated	
Academy of Country Music Awards	2019	"Broken Halos"	Song of the Year	Nominated	
Academy of Country Music Awards	2020	Chris Stapleton	Male Artist of the Year	Nominated	
Academy of Country Music Awards	2021	Chris Stapleton	Entertainer of the Year	Nominated	
Academy of Country Music Awards	2021	Chris Stapleton	Male Artist of the Year	Nominated	
Academy of Country Music Awards	2021	Starting Over	Album of the Year	Won	
Academy of Country Music Awards	2021	"Starting Over"	Song of the Year	Nominated	
Academy of Country Music Awards	2022	Chris Stapleton	Entertainer of the Year	Nominated	
Academy of Country Music Awards	2022	Chris Stapleton	Male Artist of the Year	Won	
Academy of Country Music Awards	2022	" I Bet You Think About Me (From The Vault) (Taylor's Version)" (with Taylor Swift)	Video of the Year	Nominated	
Academy of Country Music Awards	2022	"You Should Probably Leave"	Song of the Year	Nominated	
Academy of Country Music Awards	2023	Chris Stapleton	Entertainer of the Year	Won	
Academy of Country Music Awards	2023	Chris Stapleton	Male Artist of the Year	Nominated	
Academy of Country Music Awards	2023	"You Should Probably Leave" (with Ashley Gorley and Chris DuBois)	Song of the Year	Nominated	
Academy of Country Music Awards	2024	Chris Stapleton	Entertainer of the Year	Nominated	
Academy of Country Music Awards	2024	Chris Stapleton	Male Artist of the Year	Won	
Academy of Country Music Awards	2024	Chris Stapleton	Artist-Songwriter of the Year	Won	
Academy of Country Music Awards	2024	Higher	Album of the Year	Won	
Academy of Country Music Awards	2025	Chris Stapleton	Entertainer of the Year	Nominated	
Academy of Country Music Awards	2025	Chris Stapleton	Male Artist of the Year	Won	
Academy of Country Music Awards	2025	"White Horse"	Single of the Year	Nominated	
Academy of Country Music Awards	2025	"Think I'm in Love with You"	Visual Media of the Year	Nominated	
Academy of Country Music Awards	2025	"We Don't Fight Anymore" (with Carly Pearce)	Music Event of the Year	Nominated	
Academy of Country Music Awards	2026	Chris Stapleton	Entertainer of the Year	Nominated	
Academy of Country Music Awards	2026	Chris Stapleton	Male Artist of the Year	Nominated	
Academy of Country Music Awards	2026	"A Song to Sing" (with Miranda Lambert)	Song of the Year	Nominated	
Academy of Country Music Awards	2026	"A Song to Sing" (with Miranda Lambert)	Visual Media of the Year	Nominated	
Academy of Country Music Awards	2026	"A Song to Sing" (with Miranda Lambert)	Music Event of the Year	Nominated	
American Music Awards	2016	Traveller	Favorite Country Album	Nominated	
American Music Awards	2017	From A Room: Volume 1	Favorite Country Album	Nominated	
American Music Awards	2021	Himself	Favorite Country Artist	Nominated	
American Music Awards	2021	"Starting Over"	Favorite Country Song	Nominated	
American Music Awards	2021	Starting Over	Favorite Country Album	Nominated	
American Music Awards	2022	Himself	Favorite Country Artist	Nominated	
American Music Awards	2022	"You Should Probably Leave"	Favorite Country Song	Nominated	
Americana Music Honors & Awards	2016	Chris Stapleton	Artist of the Year	Won	
Americana Music Honors & Awards	2016	Traveller	Album of the Year	Nominated	
ASCAP Country Music Awards	2006	"Your Man" (by Chris DuBois, Stapleton)	Most Performed Songs	Won	
ASCAP Country Music Awards	2007	"Swing" (by Frank Rogers, Stapleton)	Most Performed Songs	Won	
ASCAP Country Music Awards	2008	"Never Wanted Nothing More" (by Stapleton, Ronnie Bowman)	Most Performed Songs	Won	
ASCAP Country Music Awards	2009	"Another You" (by Stapleton, Jeremy Spillman)	Most Performed Songs	Won	
ASCAP Country Music Awards	2010	"Keep On Lovin' You" (by Stapleton, Trent Willmon)	Most Performed Songs	Won	
ASCAP Country Music Awards	2011	"Come Back Song" (by Darius Rucker, Stapleton; recorded by Darius Rucker)	Most Performed Songs	Won	
ASCAP Country Music Awards	2012	"Love's Gonna Make It Alright" (by Stapleton, recorded by George Strait)	Most Performed Songs	Won	
ASCAP Country Music Awards	2016	Chris Stapleton	Vanguard Award	Won	
ASCAP Country Music Awards	2016	"Crash and Burn"	Most Performed Songs	Won	
ASCAP Country Music Awards	2018	"Broken Halos"	Most Performed Songs	Won	
ASCAP Country Music Awards	2021	"Starting Over"	Most Performed Songs	Won	
ASCAP Country Music Awards	2022	"You Should Probably Leave"	Most Performed Songs	Won	
ASCAP Country Music Awards	2024	Himself	Songwriter-Artist of the Year	Won	
ASCAP Country Music Awards	2024	"Think I'm In Love With You"	Most Performed Songs	Won	
ASCAP Country Music Awards	2024	"White Horse"	Most Performed Songs	Won	
ASCAP Pop Music Awards	2022	"Starting Over"	Most Performed Songs	Won	
Billboard Music Awards	2016	Chris Stapleton	Top Country Artist	Nominated	
Billboard Music Awards	2016	Traveller	Top Country Album	Won	
Billboard Music Awards	2017	Chris Stapleton	Top Country Artist	Nominated	
Billboard Music Awards	2017	Traveller	Top Country Album	Won	
Billboard Music Awards	2018	Chris Stapleton	Top Billboard 200 Artist	Nominated	
Billboard Music Awards	2018	Chris Stapleton	Top Country Artist	Won	
Billboard Music Awards	2018	Chris Stapleton	Top Country Male Artist	Won	
Billboard Music Awards	2018	From A Room: Volume 1	Top Selling Album	Nominated	
Billboard Music Awards	2018	From A Room: Volume 1	Top Country Album	Won	
Billboard Music Awards	2021	Chris Stapleton	Top Country Artist	Nominated	
Billboard Music Awards	2021	Chris Stapleton	Top Country Male Artist	Nominated	
Billboard Music Awards	2021	Starting Over	Top Country Album	Nominated	
Billboard Music Awards	2022	Chris Stapleton	Top Country Artist	Nominated	
Billboard Music Awards	2022	Chris Stapleton	Top Country Male Artist	Nominated	
Billboard Music Awards	2022	"You Should Probably Leave"	Top Country Song	Nominated	
Billboard Music Awards	2022	All-American Road Show Tour	Top Country Tour	Nominated	
Billboard Music Awards	2024	Chris Stapleton	Top Country Artist	Nominated	
Billboard Music Awards	2024	Higher	Top Country Album	Nominated	
British Country Music Association Awards	2016	Traveller	International Album of the Year	Won	
British Country Music Association Awards	2016	"Tennessee Whiskey"	International Song of the Year	Won	
CMT Honoree	2015	Chris Stapleton	Breakout Award	Won	
CMT Honoree	2016	Chris Stapleton	Honoree	Won	
CMT Honoree	2017	Chris Stapleton	Honoree	Won	
CMT Music Awards	2016	"Fire Away"	Video of the Year	Nominated	
CMT Music Awards	2016	"Fire Away"	Breakthrough Video of the Year	Won	
CMT Music Awards	2016	"Nobody to Blame" (from 2015 CMT Artists of the Year)	CMT Performance of the Year	Nominated	
CMT Music Awards	2018	"Say Something" (with Justin Timberlake)	Video of the Year	Nominated	
CMT Music Awards	2018	"Say Something" (with Justin Timberlake)	Collaborative Video of the Year	Nominated	
CMT Music Awards	2018	"I Won't Back Down" (from 2017 CMT Artists of the Year, with Jason Aldean, Keith Urban and Little Big Town)	CMT Performance of the Year	Nominated	
CMT Music Awards	2020	"Tell Me When It's Over" (with Sheryl Crow)	CMT Performance of the Year	Nominated	
CMT Music Awards	2021	"Starting Over"	Male Video of the Year	Nominated	
CMT Music Awards	2022	"Hold On" (with H.E.R.)	CMT Performance of the Year	Nominated	
CMT Music Awards	2023	" Whenever You Come Around" (from "CMT Giants: Vince Gill")	CMT Performance of the Year	Nominated	
CMT Music Awards	2024	"We Don't Fight Anymore" (with Carly Pearce)	Collaborative Video of the Year	Won	
Country Music Association Awards	2015	Traveller	Album of the Year	Won	
Country Music Association Awards	2015	Chris Stapleton	New Artist of the Year	Won	
Country Music Association Awards	2015	Chris Stapleton	Male Vocalist of the Year	Won	
Country Music Association Awards	2016	Chris Stapleton	Entertainer of the Year	Nominated	
Country Music Association Awards	2016	Chris Stapleton	Male Vocalist of the Year	Won	
Country Music Association Awards	2016	"Nobody to Blame"	Single of the Year	Nominated	
Country Music Association Awards	2016	"Fire Away"	Music Video of the Year	Won	
Country Music Association Awards	2016	"You Are My Sunshine" (with Morgane Stapleton)	Musical Event of the Year	Nominated	
Country Music Association Awards	2017	Chris Stapleton	Entertainer of the Year	Nominated	
Country Music Association Awards	2017	Chris Stapleton	Male Vocalist of the Year	Won	
Country Music Association Awards	2017	From A Room: Volume 1	Album of the Year	Won	
Country Music Association Awards	2018	Chris Stapleton	Entertainer of the Year	Nominated	
Country Music Association Awards	2018	Chris Stapleton	Male Vocalist of the Year	Won	
Country Music Association Awards	2018	From A Room: Volume 2	Album of the Year	Nominated	
Country Music Association Awards	2018	"Broken Halos"	Single of the Year	Won	
Country Music Association Awards	2018	"Broken Halos"	Song of the Year	Won	
Country Music Association Awards	2019	Chris Stapleton	Entertainer of the Year	Nominated	
Country Music Association Awards	2019	Chris Stapleton	Male Vocalist of the Year	Nominated	
Country Music Association Awards	2019	"Millionaire"	Single of the Year	Nominated	
Country Music Association Awards	2020	Chris Stapleton	Male Vocalist of the Year	Nominated	
Country Music Association Awards	2020	"Second One to Know"	Music Video of the Year	Nominated	
Country Music Association Awards	2021	Chris Stapleton	Entertainer of the Year	Nominated	
Country Music Association Awards	2021	Chris Stapleton	Male Vocalist of the Year	Won	
Country Music Association Awards	2021	Starting Over	Album of the Year	Won	
Country Music Association Awards	2021	"Starting Over"	Single of the Year	Won	
Country Music Association Awards	2021	"Starting Over"	Song of the Year	Won	
Country Music Association Awards	2022	Chris Stapleton	Entertainer of the Year	Nominated	
Country Music Association Awards	2022	Chris Stapleton	Male Vocalist of the Year	Won	
Country Music Association Awards	2022	"I Bet You Think About Me" (with Taylor Swift)	Video of the Year	Nominated	
Country Music Association Awards	2022	"You Should Probably Leave"	Single of the Year	Nominated	
Country Music Association Awards	2022	"You Should Probably Leave"	Song of the Year	Nominated	
Country Music Association Awards	2023	Chris Stapleton	Entertainer of the Year	Nominated	
Country Music Association Awards	2023	Chris Stapleton	Male Vocalist of the Year	Won	
Country Music Association Awards	2023	"We Don't Fight Anymore" (with Carly Pearce)	Musical Event of the Year	Nominated	
Country Music Association Awards	2026	Chris Stapleton	Entertainer of the Year	Pending	
Country Music Association Awards	2026	Chris Stapleton	Male Vocalist of the Year	Won	
Country Music Association Awards	2026	"White Horse"	Music Video of the Year	Nominated	
Country Music Association Awards	2026	"A Song To Sing" (with Miranda Lambert)	Musical Event of the Year	Nominated	
Grammy Awards	2009	"Blue Side of the Mountain" (as a member of The SteelDrivers)	Best Country Performance by a Duo or Group	Nominated	
Grammy Awards	2011	Reckless (as a member of The SteelDrivers)	Best Bluegrass Album	Nominated	
Grammy Awards	2011	"Where Rainbows Never Die" (as a member of The SteelDrivers)	Best Country Performance by a Duo or Group	Nominated	
Grammy Awards	2016	Traveller	Album of the Year	Nominated	
Grammy Awards	2016	Traveller	Best Country Album	Won	
Grammy Awards	2016	"Traveller"	Best Country Solo Performance	Won	
Grammy Awards	2016	"Traveller"	Best Country Song	Nominated	
Grammy Awards	2018	From A Room: Volume 1	Best Country Album	Won	
Grammy Awards	2018	"Either Way"	Best Country Solo Performance	Won	
Grammy Awards	2018	"Broken Halos"	Best Country Song	Won	
Grammy Awards	2019	"Say Something" (with Justin Timberlake)	Best Pop Duo/Group Performance	Nominated	
Grammy Awards	2019	From A Room: Volume 2	Best Country Album	Nominated	
Grammy Awards	2019	"Millionaire"	Best Country Solo Performance	Nominated	
Grammy Awards	2022	"You Should Probably Leave"	Best Country Solo Performance	Won	
Grammy Awards	2022	"Cold"	Best Country Song	Won	
Grammy Awards	2022	Starting Over	Best Country Album	Won	
Grammy Awards	2023	"I'll Love You Till The Day I Die"	Best Country Song	Nominated	
Grammy Awards	2024	"White Horse"	Best Country Song	Won	
Grammy Awards	2024	"White Horse"	Best Country Solo Performance	Won	
Grammy Awards	2024	"We Don't Fight Anymore" (with Carly Pearce)	Best Country Duo/Group Performance	Nominated	
Grammy Awards	2025	Higher	Best Country Album	Nominated	
Grammy Awards	2025	"It Takes a Woman"	Best Country Solo Performance	Won	
Grammy Awards	2026	"Bad As I Used To Be"	Best Country Solo Performance	Won	
Grammy Awards	2026	"Honky Tonk Hall of Fame" (with George Strait)	Best Country Duo/Group Performance	Nominated	
Grammy Awards	2026	"A Song to Sing" (with Miranda Lambert)	Best Country Duo/Group Performance	Nominated	
Grammy Awards	2026	"A Song to Sing" (with Miranda Lambert)	Best Country Song	Nominated	
iHeartRadio Music Awards	2017	Chris Stapleton	Best New Country Artist	Nominated	
iHeartRadio Music Awards	2017	Traveller	Country Album of the Year	Won	
iHeartRadio Music Awards	2018	From A Room: Volume 1	Country Album of the Year	Won	
iHeartRadio Music Awards	2019	"Say Something"	Song of the Year	Nominated	
MTV Video Music Awards	2018	"Say Something" (with Justin Timberlake)	Best Direction	Nominated	
MTV Video Music Awards	2025	"Think I'm in Love with You"	Best Country	Nominated	
People's Choice Awards	2024	Chris Stapleton	The Male Country Artist of the Year	Nominated	
People's Choice Country Awards	2023	"We Don't Fight Anymore"(with Carly Pearce)	The Collaboration Song of the Year	Nominated	
People's Choice Country Awards	2023	"Just Say I'm Sorry" (with Pink)	The Crossover Song of the Year	Won	
People's Choice Country Awards	2023	All-American Road Show Tour	The Concert Tour of the Year	Nominated	
People's Choice Country Awards	2024	Chris Stapleton	The Male Artist of the Year	Nominated	
People's Choice Country Awards	2024	Higher	The Album of the Year	Nominated	
Pollstar Awards	2018	Chris Stapleton's All-American Road Show Tour	Best Country Tour	Won	
Pollstar Awards	2022	Chris Stapleton's All-American Road Show Tour	Best Country Tour	Won	
Pollstar Awards	2024	Chris Stapleton's All-American Road Show Tour	Best Country Tour	Nominated	
Teen Choice Awards	2018	"Say Something" (with Justin Timberlake)	Choice Song: Male Artist	Nominated	
UK Music Video Awards	2018	"Say Something" (with Justin Timberlake)	Best Live Video	Won	
