= Chris Stapleton's All-American Road Show Tour =

2017–25 concert tour by Chris Stapleton

All-American Road Show Tour
- Tour by Chris Stapleton
- Associated album: From A Room: Volume 1 and From A Room: Volume 2
- Start date: May 5, 2017
- End date: October 10, 2026
- Legs: 7
- No. of shows: 181
- Attendance: 822,417 (in 2017)
- Box office: 38.3 million (in 2017)

Chris Stapleton concert chronology
- Hank Williams Jr. and Chris Stapleton Live in Concert (2016); All-American Road Show Tour (2017–26)

Chris Stapleton's All-American Road Show Tour is the first solo and current headlining concert tour by American singer Chris Stapleton. It is in support of his second and third studio albums, From A Room: Volume 1 and From A Room: Volume 2. The tour began on May 5, 2017, in Alpharetta, Georgia and is scheduled to end on October 10, 2026 in Kansas City, Missouri.

== Background ==
The concert tour was announced on February 16, 2017. Tickets went on sale to fan club members beginning February 21, with general public on-sale February 24. The tour started the same day that his second studio album From A Room: Volume 1 was released. Brothers Osborne, Lucie Silvas, Brent Cobb, Anderson East, Margo Price and Marty Stuart joined Stapleton as special guests playing selected dates. The 2018 dates were announced on January 29, 2018, with Cobb and Stuart set to return as special guests.

== Opening Acts ==
- Ryan Bingham
- Zach Bryan
- Brent Cobb
- Brothers Osborne
- Mike Campbell
- Sheryl Crow
- Anderson East
- Madeline Edwards
- H.E.R.
- The Highwomen
- Imagine Dragons
- Jason Isbell
- Jamey Johnson
- Elle King
- Nikki Lane
- Miranda Lambert
- Little Big Town
- Lyle Lovett
- The Marcus King Band
- Kendell Marvel
- Ashley McBryde
- Parker McCollum

- Willie Nelson
- Larkin Poe
- Grace Potter
- Margo Price
- Katie Pruitt
- Nathaniel Rateliff
- Maggie Rose
- Lucie Silvas
- Brittney Spencer
- Mavis Staples
- Allen Stone
- George Strait
- Tedeschi Trucks Band
- Turnpike Troubadours
- Marty Stuart
- Morgan Wade
- The War and Treaty
- Drake White
- Lainey Wilson
- Dwight Yoakam
- Yola
- Warren Zeiders

== Critical reception ==
Writing for Atlanta Journal-Constitution, Melissa Ruggieri reviewed the opening night, considering Stapleton generated "pure country warmth", and adding that his performances of "Fire Away" and "Traveller" demonstrated "both his versatility and commitment to authentic and unpretentious country." Chuck Yarborough for The Plain Dealer opined Stapleton "actually sings like the love child of Marvin Gaye, Joe Cocker and the Hag. It's as if someone opened a vault and discovered a whole country division of Motown soul", and praised the opening acts Brent Cobb and Margo Price. Reviewers Ruggieri and Yarborough considered Stapleton's solo performance of "Whiskey and You" a highlight of the night. Tulsa World journalist Andrea Eger, who attended Stapleton's first concert since he had to reschedule dates due to a hand injury, expressed, "there were absolutely no signs he wasn’t 100 percent–and he's one of those singers for whom recording simply does too little justice to the quality of his live vocals," while Cleveland Scene's Laura Morrison, who attended a different date, wrote, "his wizened and chest-aching vocals howled to the moon last night just as righteously as they do on his albums." Joshua Tehee of Fresno Bee commented "the singer shined on songs like "Either Way", performed without the band. He managed to cut through the din with a guitar and vocal clarity that is hard to manage in an arena setting."

Carrie Horton of The Boot said Stapleton "managed to meet–and exceed–expectations" during the second night at Nashville's Bridgestone Arena; she also noted "every song reveals a different side of Stapleton's talents", and added, "in many ways, Morgane Stapleton is as equal of a force onstage, bringing energy and a grounding sense of place to her husband every time he looks to his left." Tom Szaroleta of The Florida Times-Union praised Stapleton as a performer, writing, "[...] it was Stapleton, a bass player and a drummer. No fiddles, no pedal steel, no keyboards or backup singers; no place to hide." Kevin Coffey of Omaha World-Herald shared a similar sentiment, saying, "Stapleton played lead and rhythm on every tune, and he did it very well, even busting out some bluesy solos that went on and on." The Columbus Dispatch's Margaret Quamme noted, "many of the songs were compact, but he also managed to weave in long guitar solos without seeming self-indulgent", and concluded her review saying, "Stopping only occasionally for a quick "thank you" to the audience, Stapleton revealed the rich variety behind country music, and its deep connections to other musical forms."

For Dallas Observer, Holly Lafon wrote, "Stapleton's show was refreshingly free of the overglamorized accoutrement of country's current biggest pop stars. He traded fancy hair and flashing lights for a stripped-down presentation.[...] Only three other musicians joined him onstage. It seems to be, as he has said elsewhere, all about the music." Lafon also complimented his vocals, saying, "Stapleton's voice also sounded as pure and versatile as it does on his albums." Grary Graff of The Oakland Press commented, "the production suited Stapleton perfectly. A low-key performer by nature, he kept the focus on the playing [...] The range of his repertoire stretched from stone country to hard rock with plenty of soulful blues in between [...] When he let his guitar do the talking–playing a succession of vintage instruments that had any aficionado drooling–Stapleton was a force to be reckoned with, searing and shredding on songs such as "Death Row", "Second To Know" and extended versions of "The Devil Named Music", "Outlaw State Of Mind" and the show-closing "Sometimes I Cry." Several reviewers highlighted Stapleton showing a "fun-loving personality" while introducing the members of his band as a noteworthy part of the concert.

== Set list ==
The following set list is representative of the show on February 10, 2019. It is not representative of all concerts for the duration of the tour.

1. "Midnight Train to Memphis"
2. "Them Stems"
3. "Nobody to Blame"
4. "Hard Livin'"
5. "Millionaire"
6. "Fire Away"
7. "Might As Well Get Stoned"
8. "When the Stars Come Out"
9. "Was it 26"
10. "Whiskey and You"
11. "Broken Halos"
12. "Second One to Know"
13. "Traveller"
20. "I Was Wrong"
21. "The Devil Named Music"
22. "Parachute"
23. "Tennessee Whiskey"

Encore

1. "Outlaw State of Mind"
2. "Death Row"
3. "Sometimes I Cry"

Notes

- At selected dates Stapleton performed "Either Way".
- At selected dates Stapleton performed "Sometimes I Cry" as the closing number.
- During his concert on July 14, 2017, Stapleton performed "Was It 26" (by Charlie Daniels).
- During his concert on November 3, 2017, Stapleton performed "Last Thing I Needed, First Thing This Morning" (by Willie Nelson), and "I Ain't Living Long Like This" (by Waylon Jennings) with Marty Stuart.

== Tour dates ==
List of concerts, showing date, city, country, venue, opening acts, tickets sold, number of available tickets and amount of gross revenue
Date	City	Country	Venue	Opening acts	Attendance	Revenue
2017
April 20, 2017	Roanoke	United States	Berglund Coliseum	Brent Cobb	10,500/10,500	
April 21, 2017	Pikeville	United States	East Kentucky Expo Center	Brothers Osborne; Lucie Silvas		
April 29, 2017	Bloomington	United States	The Coliseum	Brothers Osborne; Lucie Silvas		
May 5, 2017	Alpharetta	United States	Verizon Wireless Amphitheatre	Brothers Osborne; Lucie Silvas	24,970 / 24,970	$1,341,641
May 6, 2017	Alpharetta	United States	Verizon Wireless Amphitheatre	Brothers Osborne; Lucie Silvas	24,970 / 24,970	$1,341,641
May 11, 2017	Virginia Beach	United States	Veterans United Home Loans Amphitheater	Brothers Osborne; Lucie Silvas	11,061 / 19,823	$549,196
May 12, 2017	Raleigh	United States	Coastal Credit Union Music Park	Brothers Osborne; Lucie Silvas	19,980 / 19,980	$851,025
May 13, 2017	Charlotte	United States	PNC Music Pavilion	Brothers Osborne; Lucie Silvas	18,845 / 18,845	$900,324
May 18, 2017	Chula Vista	United States	Mattress Firm Amphitheatre	Brothers Osborne; Lucie Silvas	13,563 / 19,582	$684,462
May 19, 2017	Phoenix	United States	Ak-Chin Pavilion	Brothers Osborne; Lucie Silvas	17,879 / 19,598	$820,359
May 20, 2017	Inglewood	United States	The Forum	Brothers Osborne; Lucie Silvas	—	—
May 23, 2017	Morrison	United States	Red Rocks Amphitheatre	Brothers Osborne; Lucie Silvas	19,050 / 19,050	$1,214,035
May 24, 2017	Morrison	United States	Red Rocks Amphitheatre	Brothers Osborne; Lucie Silvas	19,050 / 19,050	$1,214,035
June 22, 2017	Tulsa	United States	BOK Center	Anderson East; Brent Cobb	12,187 / 12,187	$735,849
June 23, 2017 (Note: The June 23, 2017 concert was part of the Country Stampede Music Festival.)	Manhattan	United States	Tuttle Creek Lake State Park	—N/a	—N/a	
June 24, 2017 (Note: The June 24, 2017 concert was part of the Nebraskaland Days event.)	North Platte	United States	Wild West Arena	—N/a	—N/a	
July 5, 2017 (Note: The July 5, 2017 concert was part of the Summerfest.)	Milwaukee	United States	American Family Insurance Amphitheater			
July 6, 2017 (Note: The July 6, 2017 concert was part of the Summerfest.)	Milwaukee	United States	American Family Insurance Amphitheater			
July 14, 2017	Mansfield	United States	Xfinity Center	Anderson East; Brent Cobb	14,925 / 19,900	$760,760
July 15, 2017	Hartford	United States	Xfinity Theatre	Anderson East; Brent Cobb	12,635 / 24,087	$568,868
July 16, 2017	Darien	United States	Darien Lake Performing Arts Center	Anderson East; Brent Cobb	10,956 / 21,549	$370,628
July 20, 2017	Holmdel	United States	PNC Bank Arts Center	Anderson East; Brent Cobb	10,792 / 16,924	$391,250
July 21, 2017	Wantagh	United States	Northwell Health at Jones Beach Theater	Anderson East; Brent Cobb	11,568 / 13,649	$571,183
July 22, 2017	Bristow	United States	Jiffy Lube Live	Anderson East; Brent Cobb	20,122 / 22,667	$933,567
July 28, 2017 (Note: The July 28, 2017 concert was part of the Watershed Music Festival.)	George	United States	The Gorge Amphitheatre	—N/a	—N/a	
July 29, 2017 (Note: The July 29, 2017 concert was part of the Country Crossings Music Festival.)	Central Point	United States	Jackson County Expo	—N/a	—N/a	
July 30, 2017 (Note: The July 30, 2017 concert was part of the Mountain Home Country Music Festival.)	Mountain Home	United States	East of Mountain Home	—N/a	—N/a	
August 3, 2017	Duluth	United States	AMSOIL Arena	Margo Price; Brent Cobb	6,844 / 6,844	$453,153
August 4, 2017 (Note: The August 4, 2017 concert was part of the Country on the River Music Festival.)	Prairie du Chien	United States	Wisconsin Campgrounds	—N/a	—N/a	
August 5, 2017	Maryland Heights	United States	Hollywood Casino Amphitheatre	Margo Price; Brent Cobb	18,859 / 18,859	$723,571
August 10, 2017	Hershey	United States	Giant Center	Margo Price; Brent Cobb	7,615 / 9,016	$490,506
August 11, 2017	Burgettstown	United States	KeyBank Pavilion	Margo Price; Brent Cobb	12,672 / 13,507	$396,788
August 12, 2017	Camden	United States	BB&T Pavilion	Margo Price; Brent Cobb	11,434 / 25,413	$385,952
August 17, 2017	Toronto	Canada	Budweiser Stage	Margo Price; Brent Cobb	15,998 / 15,998	$664,723
August 18, 2017	Cuyahoga Falls	United States	Blossom Music Center	Margo Price; Brent Cobb	14,364 / 20,467	$576,725
August 19, 2017	Clarkston	United States	DTE Energy Music Theatre	Margo Price; Brent Cobb	14,903 / 15,028	$681,887
August 25, 2017	Gilford	United States	Bank of New Hampshire Pavilion	Margo Price; Brent Cobb	16,902 / 17,568	$879,030
August 26, 2017	Gilford	United States	Bank of New Hampshire Pavilion	Margo Price; Brent Cobb	16,902 / 17,568	$879,030
August 31, 2017	Fresno	United States	Save Mart Center	Anderson East; Lucie Silvas	8,911 / 11,721	$553,153
September 1, 2017	Mountain View	United States	Shoreline Amphitheatre	Anderson East; Lucie Silvas	17,305 / 22,000	$763,689
September 2, 2017	Wheatland	United States	Toyota Amphitheatre	Anderson East; Lucie Silvas	18,215 / 18,500	$865,231
September 8, 2017	Cincinnati	United States	Riverbend Music Center	Anderson East; Lucie Silvas	20,341 / 20,341	$824,806
September 9, 2017	Noblesville	United States	Klipsch Music Center	Anderson East; Lucie Silvas	23,070 / 24,740	$867,955
September 15, 2017	Southaven	United States	BankPlus Amphitheater	Anderson East; Brent Cobb	13,095 / 13,095	$637,657
September 16, 2017	Pelham	United States	Oak Mountain Amphitheatre	Anderson East; Brent Cobb	10,250 / 10,250	$553,008
September 22, 2017 (Note: The September 22, 2017 concert was part of the iHeartRadio Music Festival.)	Las Vegas	United States	T-Mobile Arena			
September 24, 2017 (Note: The September 24, 2017 concert was part of the A Concert for Charlottesville.)	Charlottesville	United States	Scott Stadium			
October 5, 2017	Moline	United States	TaxSlayer Center	Margo Price; Brent Cobb	7,317 / 10,146	$435,638
October 6, 2017	Des Moines	United States	Wells Fargo Arena	Margo Price; Brent Cobb	12,519 / 13,150	$794,174
October 7, 2017	Saint Paul	United States	Xcel Energy Center	Margo Price; Brent Cobb	14,511 / 14,511	$930,938
October 13, 2017	Nashville	United States	Bridgestone Arena	Brothers Osborne; Brent Cobb	27,865 / 27,865	$1,743,783
October 14, 2017	Nashville	United States	Bridgestone Arena	Brothers Osborne; Brent Cobb	27,865 / 27,865	$1,743,783
October 19, 2017	Baton Rouge	United States	Raising Cane's River Center Arena	Marty Stuart; Brent Cobb	7,683 / 7,683	$511,927
October 20, 2017	San Antonio	United States	AT&T Center	Marty Stuart; Brent Cobb	11,774 / 12,647	$689,071
October 21, 2017	Bossier City	United States	CenturyLink Center	Marty Stuart; Brent Cobb	11,614 / 11,614	$766,106
October 26, 2017	Austin	United States	Austin360 Amphitheater	Marty Stuart; Brent Cobb	13,114 / 13,114	$695,734
October 27, 2017	The Woodlands	United States	Cynthia Woods Mitchell Pavilion	Marty Stuart; Brent Cobb	16,571 / 16,571	$760,144
October 28, 2017	Dallas	United States	Starplex Pavilion	Marty Stuart; Brent Cobb	20,054 / 20,054	$893,221
November 2, 2017	Charleston	United States	Charleston Civic Center	Marty Stuart; Brent Cobb	8,313 / 8,313	$513,985
November 3, 2017	Columbus	United States	Nationwide Arena	Marty Stuart; Brent Cobb	13,406 / 13,406	$873,805
November 4, 2017	Grand Rapids	United States	Van Andel Arena	Marty Stuart; Brent Cobb	10,351 / 10,351	$656,408
November 10, 2017	Tampa	United States	MidFlorida Credit Union Amphitheatre	Marty Stuart; Brent Cobb	18,714 / 19,222	$734,986
November 11, 2017	Jacksonville	United States	Jacksonville Veterans Memorial Arena	Marty Stuart; Brent Cobb	11,373 / 11,373	$706,407
November 16, 2017	North Little Rock	United States	Verizon Arena	Marty Stuart; Brent Cobb	12,837 / 14,227	$703,948
November 17, 2017	Oklahoma City	United States	Chesapeake Energy Arena	Marty Stuart; Brent Cobb	11,591 / 11,852	$687,431
November 18, 2017	Omaha	United States	CenturyLink Center Omaha	Marty Stuart; Brent Cobb	12,842 / 14,139	$722,147
2018
June 16, 2018	Brandon	United States	Brandon Amphitheatere	Marty Stuart; Brent Cobb	—	—
June 22, 2018	Rogers	United States	Walmart Arkansas Music Pavilion	Marty Stuart; Brent Cobb	—	—
June 28, 2018	Darien	United States	Darien Lake Amphitheatre	Marty Stuart; Brent Cobb	—	—
June 29, 2018	Camden	United States	BB&T Pavilion	Marty Stuart; Brent Cobb	—	—
June 30, 2018	Mansfield	United States	Xfinity Center	Marty Stuart; Brent Cobb	—	—
July 13, 2018	Maryland Heights	United States	Hollywood Casino Amphitheatre	Marty Stuart; Brent Cobb	—	—
July 14, 2018 (Note: The July 14, 2018 concert was part of the Forecastle Festival.)	Louisville	United States	Waterfront Park	Marty Stuart; Brent Cobb		
July 15, 2018 (Note: The July 15, 2018 concert was part of the Sloss Fest.)	Birmingham	United States	Sloss Furnaces	Marty Stuart; Brent Cobb		
July 19, 2018	Spokane	United States	Spokane Arena	Marty Stuart; Brent Cobb	—	—
July 20, 2018	Ridgefield	United States	Sunlight Supply Amphitheater	Marty Stuart; Brent Cobb	—	—
July 21, 2018	Auburn	United States	White River Amphitheatre	Marty Stuart; Brent Cobb	—	—
July 26, 2018	Stateline	United States	Harveys Outdoor Amphitheater	Marty Stuart; Brent Cobb	—	—
July 27, 2018	Wheatland	United States	Toyota Amphitheatre	Marty Stuart; Brent Cobb	—	—
July 28, 2018	Mountain View	United States	Shoreline Amphitheatre	Marty Stuart; Brent Cobb	—	—
August 2, 2018	Billings	United States	Rimrock Auto Arena at MetraPark	Marty Stuart; Brent Cobb	—	—
August 3, 2018	Missoula	United States	Adams Center	Marty Stuart; Brent Cobb	—	—
August 4, 2018	Nampa	United States	Ford Idaho Center Arena	Marty Stuart; Brent Cobb	—	—
August 9, 2018	Albuquerque	United States	Isleta Amphitheater	Marty Stuart; Brent Cobb	—	—
August 10, 2018	Denver	United States	Pepsi Center	Marty Stuart; Brent Cobb	—	—
August 11, 2018	West Valley City	United States	USANA Amphitheatre	Marty Stuart; Brent Cobb	—	—
August 16, 2018	Chula Vista	United States	Mattress Firm Amphitheatre	Marty Stuart; Brent Cobb	—	—
August 17, 2018	Anaheim	United States	Honda Center	Marty Stuart; Brent Cobb	—	—
August 18, 2018	Inglewood	United States	The Forum	Marty Stuart; Brent Cobb	—	—
August 23, 2018	Saratoga Springs	United States	Saratoga Performing Arts Center	Marty Stuart; Brent Cobb	—	—
August 24, 2018	Gilford	United States	Bank of New Hampshire Pavilion	Marty Stuart; Brent Cobb	—	—
August 25, 2018	Gilford	United States	Bank of New Hampshire Pavilion	Marty Stuart; Brent Cobb	—	—
October 4, 2018	Cincinnati	United States	Riverbend Music Center	Marty Stuart; Brent Cobb	—	—
October 5, 2018	Noblesville	United States	Ruoff Home Mortgage Music Center	Marty Stuart; Brent Cobb	—	—
October 6, 2018	Tinley Park	United States	Hollywood Casino Amphitheatre	Marty Stuart; Brent Cobb	—	—
October 11, 2018	Charlotte	United States	PNC Music Pavilion	Marty Stuart; Brent Cobb	—	—
October 12, 2018	Raleigh	United States	Coastal Credit Union Music Park	Marty Stuart; Brent Cobb	—	—
October 13, 2018	Bristow	United States	Jiffy Lube Live	Marty Stuart; Brent Cobb	—	—
October 18, 2018	Tuscaloosa	United States	Tuscaloosa Amphitheater	Marty Stuart; Brent Cobb	—	—
October 19, 2018	Alpharetta	United States	Verizon Wireless Amphitheatre	Marty Stuart; Brent Cobb	—	—
October 20, 2018	Atlanta	United States	Lakewood Amphitheatre	Marty Stuart; Brent Cobb	—	—
October 25, 2018	Columbia, SC	United States	Colonial Life Arena	Marty Stuart; Brent Cobb	—	—
October 26, 2018	Knoxville	United States	Thompson–Boling Arena	Marty Stuart; Brent Cobb	—	—
October 27, 2018	Lexington	United States	Rupp Arena	Marty Stuart; Brent Cobb	—	—
November 2, 2018	New York City	United States	Madison Square Garden	Marty Stuart; Brent Cobb	—	—
November 3, 2018	Charlottesville	United States	John Paul Jones Arena	Marty Stuart; Brent Cobb	—	—
November 4, 2018	Baltimore	United States	Royal Farms Arena	Marty Stuart; Brent Cobb	—	—
November 11, 2018 (Note: The November 11, 2018 concert was part of the VetsAid Concert.)	Tacoma	United States	Tacoma Dome			
2019
March 8, 2019 (Note: The March 8 concert was part of the C2C: Country to Country festival.)	Glasgow	Scotland	SSE Hydro	Lyle Lovett; Ashley McBryde; Drake White		
March 9, 2019 (Note: The March 9 concert was part of the C2C: Country to Country festival.)	Dublin	Ireland	3Arena	Lyle Lovett; Ashley McBryde; Drake White		
March 10, 2019 (Note: The March 10 concert was part of the C2C: Country to Country festival.)	London	England	The O2	Lyle Lovett; Ashley McBryde; Drake White		
July 9, 2019	Allentown	United States	PPL Center	Margo Price; The Marcus King Band	—	—
July 14, 2019 (Note: The July 14, 2019 concert was part of the Craven Country Jamboree.)	Craven	Canada	Craven Country Jamboree	Margo Price; The Marcus King Band		
July 19, 2019	Omaha	United States	CHI Health Center Omaha	Margo Price; The Marcus King Band	—	—
July 25, 2019	Bangor	United States	Darling's Waterfront Pavilion	Margo Price; The Marcus King Band		
July 26, 2019	Bethel	United States	Bethel Woods Center	Margo Price; The Marcus King Band		
July 27, 2019	Hopewell	United States	Marvin Sands Performing Arts Center	Margo Price; The Marcus King Band		
August 1, 2019	Charleston	United States	Charleston Civic Center	Margo Price; The Marcus King Band		
August 2, 2019	Clarkston	United States	DTE Energy Music Theatre	Margo Price; The Marcus King Band		
August 9, 2019	Holmdel	United States	PNC Bank Arts Center	Margo Price; The Marcus King Band		
August 10, 2019	Burgettstown	United States	KeyBank Pavilion	Margo Price; The Marcus King Band		
August 11, 2019	Columbia, MD	United States	Merriweather Post Pavilion	Margo Price; The Marcus King Band		
August 15, 2019	Erie	United States	Erie Insurance Arena	Brent Cobb; The Marcus King Band		
August 16, 2019	Grand Rapids	United States	Van Andel Arena	Brent Cobb; The Marcus King Band	—	—
August 17, 2019	Toronto	Canada	Budweiser Stage	Brent Cobb; The Marcus King Band	—	—
August 22, 2019	Wichita	United States	Intrust Bank Arena	Brent Cobb; The Marcus King Band	—	—
August 23, 2019	North Little Rock	United States	Verizon Arena	Brent Cobb; The Marcus King Band	—	—
August 24, 2019	Bossier City	United States	CenturyLink Center	Brent Cobb; The Marcus King Band	—	—
August 29, 2019	Huntsville	United States	Von Braun Center	Brent Cobb; The Marcus King Band		
August 31, 2019	Orange Beach	United States	The Wharf Amphitheater	Brent Cobb; The Marcus King Band		
October 3, 2019	Springfield	United States	JQH Arena	Brothers Osborne; Kendell Marvel	8,392 / 8,392	$738,211
October 4, 2019	Oklahoma City	United States	Chesapeake Energy Arena	Brothers Osborne; Kendell Marvel	11,898 / 11,898	$1,057,990
October 5, 2019	Memphis	United States	FedExForum	Brothers Osborne; Kendell Marvel	12,563 / 12,563	$1,101,094
October 10, 2019	Jacksonville	United States	VyStar Veterans Memorial Arena	Brothers Osborne; Kendell Marvel		
October 11, 2019	Tampa	United States	MidFlorida Credit Union Amphitheatre	Brothers Osborne; Kendell Marvel	18,559 / 18,559	$1,229,271
October 12, 2019	West Palm Beach	United States	Coral Sky Amphitheatre	Brothers Osborne; Kendell Marvel	18,839 / 18,839	$1,062,373
October 17, 2019	North Charleston	United States	North Charleston Coliseum	Brothers Osborne; Kendell Marvel	8,349 / 8,349	$791,863
October 18, 2019	Virginia Beach	United States	Veterans United Home Loans Amphitheater	Brothers Osborne; Kendell Marvel	20,283 / 20,283	$1,115,030
October 19, 2019	Greensboro	United States	Greensboro Coliseum	Brothers Osborne; Kendell Marvel	13,358 / 13,358	$1,275,131
October 20, 2019	Edmond	United States	The Baumberhof	Brothers Osborne; Kendell Marvel		
October 24, 2019	Madison	United States	Alliant Energy Center	Brothers Osborne; Kendell Marvel	8,473 / 8,473	$753,510
October 25, 2019	Peoria	United States	Peoria Civic Center	Brothers Osborne; Kendell Marvel	9,095 / 9,095	$771,409
October 26, 2019	Kansas City	United States	Sprint Center	Brothers Osborne; Kendell Marvel	13,127 / 13,127	$1,153,205
November 1, 2019	Greenville	United States	Bon Secours Wellness Arena	Brothers Osborne; Kendell Marvel	10,566 / 10,566	$1,031,721
November 2, 2019	Louisville	United States	KFC Yum! Center	Brothers Osborne; Kendell Marvel	15,748 / 15,748	$1,394,874
2020
March 11, 2020	Corpus Christi	United States	American Bank Center	Jamey JohnsonYola		
2021
July 28, 2021	Gilford	United States	Bank of New Hampshire Pavilion	Elle KingNikki Lane		
July 29, 2021	Gilford	United States	Bank of New Hampshire Pavilion	Elle KingNikki Lane		
July 30, 2021	Gilford	United States	Bank of New Hampshire Pavilion	Elle KingNikki Lane		
August 5, 2021	Cuyahoga Falls	United States	Blossom Music Center	Kendell Marvel		
August 6, 2021	Clarkston	United States	DTE Energy Music Theatre	Nikki Lane; Kendell Marvel		
August 7, 2021	Clarkston	United States	DTE Energy Music Theatre	Yola; Kendell Marvel		
August 12, 2021	Charlotte	United States	PNC Music Pavilion	Kendell Marvel; Nikki Lane		
August 13, 2021	Raleigh	United States	Coastal Credit Union Music Park	Kendell Marvel; Nikki Lane		
August 14, 2021	Bristow	United States	Jiffy Lube Live			
August 19, 2021	Des Moines	United States	Iowa State Fair	Nikki Lane		
August 21, 2021	Arlington	United States	Globe Life Field	Willie Nelson; Jamey Johnson; Yola		
August 22, 2021	Austin	United States	Germania Insurance Amphitheater	Willie Nelson; Ryan Bingham; Yola		
August 26, 2021	Tampa	United States	MidFlorida Credit Union Amphitheatre	Sheryl Crow; Kendell Marvel		
August 27, 2021	Alpharetta	United States	Ameris Bank Amphitheatre	Sheryl Crow; Kendell Marvel		
August 28, 2021	Atlanta	United States	Cellairis Amphitheatre	Sheryl Crow; Kendell Marvel		
September 9, 2021	Milwaukee	United States	American Family Insurance Amphitheater	Sheryl Crow		
September 16, 2021	Maryland Heights	United States	Hollywood Casino Amphitheatre	The Marcus King Band; Yola		
September 17, 2021	Pelham	United States	Oak Mountain Amphitheatre	The Marcus King Band; Yola		
September 18, 2021	Orange Beach	United States	The Wharf Amphitheater	The Marcus King Band; Yola		
September 23, 2021	Bethel	United States	Bethel Woods Center	Margo Price; Kendell Marvel		
September 24, 2021	Burgettstown	United States	The Pavilion At Star Lake	Margo Price; Kendell Marvel		
September 25, 2021	Noblesville	United States	Ruoff Music Center	Yola; Kendell Marvel		
September 30, 2021	Virginia Beach	United States	Veterans United Home Loans Amphitheater	The Marcus King Band; Caylee Hammack		
October 1, 2021	Camden	United States	BB&T Pavilion	The Marcus King Band; Caylee Hammack		
October 2, 2021	Mansfield	United States	Xfinity Center	The Marcus King Band; Caylee Hammack		
October 7, 2021	Syracuse	United States	Lakeview Amphitheater	Sheryl Crow; Kendell Marvel		
October 8, 2021	New York City	United States	Madison Square Garden	The Marcus King Band; Yola		
October 9, 2021	Holmdel	United States	PNC Bank Arts Center	Sheryl Crow; Kendell Marvel		
October 14, 2021	Columbia, MO	United States	Mizzou Arena	The Marcus King Band; Yola		
October 15, 2021	Lincoln	United States	Pinnacle Bank Arena	The Marcus King Band; Yola		
October 28, 2021	Lubbock	United States	United Supermarkets Arena	Jamey Johnson; Yola		
October 29, 2021	Albuquerque	United States	Isleta Amphitheater	Jamey Johnson; Yola		
October 30, 2021	Phoenix	United States	Ak-Chin Pavilion	Jamey Johnson; Yola		
November 4, 2021	Austin	United States	Frank Erwin Center	Jamey Johnson; Yola		
November 5, 2021	Tulsa	United States	BOK Center	Jamey Johnson; Yola		
November 6, 2021	The Woodlands	United States	Cynthia Woods Mitchell Pavilion	Jamey Johnson; Yola		
November 13, 2021	Minneapolis	United States	U.S. Bank Stadium	George Strait; Little Big Town		
November 14, 2021	Sioux Falls	United States	Denny Sanford Premier Center	The Marcus King Band; Nikki Lane		
November 18, 2021	Orlando	United States	Amway Center	Sheryl Crow; Kendell Marvel		
November 19, 2021	Estero	United States	Hertz Arena	Sheryl Crow; Kendell Marvel		
November 20, 2021	West Palm Beach	United States	iTHINK Financial Amphitheatre	Sheryl Crow; Kendell Marvel		
December 3, 2021	Memphis	United States	FedExForum	The Marcus King Band Yola		
December 4, 2021	Biloxi	United States	Mississippi Coast Coliseum	The Marcus King Band Yola		
December 5, 2021	Knoxville	United States	Thompson-Boling Arena	The Marcus King Band Yola		
December 10, 2021	Nashville	United States	Bridgestone Arena	The Marcus King Band Yola		
December 11, 2021	Nashville	United States	Bridgestone Arena	The Marcus King Band Yola		
2022
March 17, 2022	Houston	United States	RodeoHouston			
March 18, 2022	Durant	United States	Choctaw Casino Resort			
March 19, 2022	Durant	United States	Choctaw Casino Resort			
April 8, 2022	Atlantic City	United States	Hard Rock Live			
April 9, 2022	Atlantic City	United States	Hard Rock Live			
April 20, 2022	Toledo	United States	Huntington Center	Margo Price; Madeline Edwards		
April 21, 2022	Columbus	United States	Schottenstein Center	Margo Price; Madeline Edwards		
April 23, 2022	Lexington	United States	Kroger Field	Willie Nelson; Sheryl Crow; Madeline Edwards		
May 5, 2022	Regina	Canada	Brandt Centre	Elle King		
May 6, 2022	Saskatoon	Canada	SaskTel Centre	Elle King		
May 7, 2022	Winnipeg	Canada	Canada Life Centre	Elle King		
May 11, 2022	Edmonton	Canada	Rogers Place	Elle King		
May 12, 2022	Calgary	Canada	Scotiabank Saddledome	Elle King		
May 14, 2022	Vancouver	Canada	Rogers Place	Elle King		
June 2, 2022	Nampa	United States	Ford Idaho Center Arena	Margo Price Mike Campbell		
June 3, 2022	Ridgefield	United States	RV Inn Style Resorts Amphitheater	Margo Price Mike Campbell		
June 4, 2022	George	United States	The Gorge Amphitheatre	Margo Price Mike Campbell		
June 9, 2022	Chula Vista	United States	North Island Credit Union Amphitheatre	Dwight Yoakam; Mike Campbell		
June 10, 2022	Inglewood	United States	Kia Forum	Dwight Yoakam; Mike Campbell		
June 11, 2022	San Bernardino	United States	Glen Helen Amphitheater	Dwight Yoakam; Mike Campbell		
June 16, 2022	Bakersfield	United States	Mechanics Bank Arena	Margo Price; Mike Campbell		
June 17, 2022	Wheatland	United States	Toyota Amphitheatre	Margo Price; Mike Campbell		
June 18, 2022	Mountain View	United States	Shoreline Amphitheatre	Margo Price; Mike Campbell		
July 1, 2022	West Valley City	United States	USANA Amphitheatre	Margo Price; Mike Campbell		
July 2, 2022	Denver	United States	Ball Arena	Margo Price; Mike Campbell		
July 3, 2022	Denver	United States	Ball Arena	Margo Price; Mike Campbell		
July 7, 2022	Cuyahoga Falls	United States	Blossom Music Center	Elle King Madeline Edwards		
July 8, 2022	Detroit	United States	Comerica Park	Nathaniel Rateliff; Marty Stuart; Madeline Edwards		
July 9, 2022	Charleston	United States	Charleston Civic Center	Elle King; Madeline Edwards		
July 14, 2022	Tuscaloosa	United States	Tuscaloosa Amphitheater	Elle King; Madeline Edwards		
July 15, 2022	Orange Beach	United States	The Wharf Amphitheater	Elle King; Madeline Edwards		
July 16, 2022	Brandon	United States	Brandon Amphitheatre	Elle King; Madeline Edwards		
July 21, 2022	Mount Pleasant	United States	Soaring Eagle Casino & Resort	Elle King		
July 22, 2022	Noblesville	United States	Ruoff Music Center	Elle King; Madeline Edwards		
July 23, 2022	Chicago	United States	Wrigley Field	The Highwomen; Mavis Staples; Mike Campbell		
July 28, 2022	Huntsville	United States	Orion Amphitheater	Elle King; Madeline Edwards		
July 29, 2022	Rogers	United States	Walmart Arkansas Music Pavilion	Elle King; Madeline Edwards		
July 30, 2022	Kansas City	United States	Arrowhead Stadium	George Strait		
August 4, 2022	Gilford	United States	Bank of New Hampshire Pavilion	Elle King; Madeline Edwards		
August 5, 2022	Gilford	United States	Bank of New Hampshire Pavilion	Elle King; Madeline Edwards		
August 6, 2022	Gilford	United States	Bank of New Hampshire Pavilion	Elle King; Madeline Edwards		
August 17, 2022	Hopewell	United States	Marvin Sands Performing Arts Center	Elle King; Madeline Edwards		
August 19, 2022	Cincinnati	United States	Riverbend Music Center	Elle King; Madeline Edwards		
August 20, 2022	Columbia, MD	United States	Merriweather Post Pavilion	Elle King; Madeline Edwards		
August 25, 2022	Wantagh	United States	Northwell Health at Jones Beach Theater	Elle King; Morgan Wade		
August 26, 2022	Saratoga Springs	United States	Saratoga Performing Arts Center	Elle King; Morgan Wade		
August 27, 2022	Hershey	United States	Hersheypark Stadium	Elle King; Morgan Wade		
August 31, 2022	Boston	United States	MGM Music Hall at Fenway	Morgan Wade		
September 1, 2022	Boston	United States	MGM Music Hall at Fenway	Morgan Wade		
September 3, 2022	Aspen	United States	Jazz at Aspen			
September 8, 2022	Montreal	Canada	Bell Centre	Nikki Lane		
September 9, 2022	Ottawa	Canada	Canadian Tire Centre	Nikki Lane		
September 10, 2022	London	Canada	Budweiser Gardens	Nikki Lane		
September 18, 2022	Louisville	United States	Bourbon & Beyond			
September 23, 2022	Camden	United States	Freedom Mortgage Pavilion	Willie Nelson; Zach Bryan; Larkin Poe; Brittney Spencer		
September 24, 2022	Raleigh	United States	Coastal Credit Union Music Park	Elle King; Nikki Lane		
September 25, 2022	Franklin	United States	Pilgrimage Music & Cultural Festival			
October 6, 2022	Grand Forks	United States	Alerus Center	Elle King; Morgan Wade		
October 7, 2022	Saint Paul	United States	Xcel Energy Center	Elle King; Morgan Wade		
October 8, 2022	Milwaukee	United States	Fiserv Forum	Elle King; Morgan Wade		
October 13, 2022	Jacksonville	United States	VyStar Veterans Memorial Arena	Elle King; Morgan Wade		
October 14, 2022	Tampa	United States	MidFlorida Credit Union Amphitheatre	Elle King; Morgan Wade		
October 15, 2022	Hollywood	United States	Hard Rock Live	Elle King; Morgan Wade		
October 20, 2022	North Little Rock	United States	Simmons Bank Arena	Elle King; Morgan Wade		
October 21, 2022	Bossier City	United States	Brookshire Grocery Arena	Elle King; Morgan Wade		
October 22, 2022	New Orleans	United States	Smoothie King Center	Elle King; Morgan Wade		
October 27, 2022	Fort Worth	United States	Dickies Arena	Elle King; Morgan Wade		
October 28, 2022	The Woodlands	United States	Cynthia Woods Mitchell Pavilion	Elle King; Morgan Wade		
November 12, 2022	Atlanta	United States	Mercedes-Benz Stadium	Miranda Lambert; Dwight Yoakam; Katie Pruitt		
2023
January 21, 2023	Riviera Maya	Mexico	Luke Bryan's Crash My Playa			
March 16, 2023	Houston	United States	RodeoHouston			
March 17, 2023	Durant	United States	Choctaw Casino Resort			
March 18, 2023	Durant	United States	Choctaw Casino Resort			
April 26, 2023	El Paso	United States	Don Haskins Center	Margo Price; Nikki Lane		
April 27, 2023	Albuquerque	United States	Isleta Amphitheatre	Margo Price; Nikki Lane		
April 29, 2023	Los Angeles	United States	Hollywood Bowl			
April 30, 2023	Indio	United States	Stagecoach Festival			
May 6, 2023	Atlanta	United States	Mercedes-Benz Stadium	George Strait; Little Big Town		
May 27, 2023	Columbus	United States	Ohio Stadium	George Strait; Little Big Town; Warren Zeiders		
June 1, 2023	Moline	United States	Vibrant Arena at The Mark	Marcus King; The War and Treaty		
June 2, 2023	Grand Rapids	United States	Van Andel Arena	Marcus King; The War and Treaty		
June 3, 2023	Milwaukee	United States	American Family Field	George Strait; Little Big Town		
June 8, 2023	Syracuse	United States	Lakeview Amphitheatre	Charley Crockett; The War and Treaty		
June 9, 2023	Mansfield	United States	Xfinity Center	Charley Crockett; The War and Treaty		
June 10, 2023	Mansfield	United States	Xfinity Center	Charley Crockett; The War and Treaty		
June 11, 2023	Syracuse	United States	Lakeview Amphitheatre	Charley Crockett; The War and Treaty		
June 15, 2023	Spokane	United States	Spokane Arena	Marty Stuart; Allen Stone		
June 16, 2023	Bend	United States	Hayden Holmes Amphitheater	Marty Stuart; Allen Stone		
June 17, 2023	Seattle	United States	Lumen Field	George Strait; Little Big Town		
June 22, 2023	Des Moines	United States	Wells Fargo Arena	Marty Stuart; Allen Stone		
June 24, 2023	Denver	United States	Empower Field at Mile High	George Strait; Little Big Town		
July 6, 2023	Bethel	United States	Bethel Woods Center	Marty Stuart; Allen Stone		
July 7, 2023	Bangor	United States	Maine Savings Amphitheater	Marty Stuart; Allen Stone		
July 8, 2023	Cavendish Beach	Canada	Cavendish Beach Music Festival			
July 13, 2023	Charleston	United States	Credit One Stadium	Margo Price; Allen Stone		
July 14, 2023	Virginia Beach	United States	Veterans United Home Loans Amphitheater	Margo Price; Allen Stone		
July 15, 2023	Baltimore	United States	CFG Bank Arena	Margo Price; Allen Stone		
July 19, 2023	Omaha	United States	CHI Health Center Omaha	Marty Stuart; The War and Treaty		
July 20, 2023	Maryland Heights	United States	Hollywood Casino Amphitheatre	Marty Stuart; The War and Treaty		
July 22, 2023	Cullman	United States	Rock the South			
July 28, 2023	Nashville	United States	Nissan Stadium	George Strait; Little Big Town		
July 29, 2023	Nashville	United States	Nissan Stadium	George Strait; Little Big Town		
August 5, 2023	Tampa	United States	Raymond James Stadium	George Strait; Little Big Town		
August 10, 2023	Gliford	United States	Bank of New Hampshire Pavilion	Marty Stuart; The War and Treaty		
August 11, 2023	Gliford	United States	Bank of New Hampshire Pavilion	Marty Stuart; The War and Treaty		
August 12, 2023	Gliford	United States	Bank of New Hampshire Pavilion	Marty Stuart; The War and Treaty		
August 17, 2023	Toronto	Canada	Budwesier Stage	Marcus King; The War and Treaty		
August 18, 2023	Toronto	Canada	Budwesier Stage	Marcus King; The War and Treaty		
August 19, 2023	Montreal	Canada	Lasso Festival			
August 24, 2023	Memphis	United States	FedEx Forum	Marcus King; Allen Stone		
August 25, 2023	Alpharetta	United States	Ameris Bank Amphitheatre	Marcus King; Allen Stone		
August 26, 2023	Alpharetta	United States	Ameris Bank Amphitheatre	Marcus King; Allen Stone		
October 5, 2023	Charlottesville	United States	John Paul Jones Arena	Margo Price; Nikki Lane		
October 6, 2023	State College	United States	Bryce Jordan Center	Margo Price; Nikki Lane		
October 7, 2023	Elmont	United States	UBS Arena	Margo Price; Nikki Lane		
October 19, 2023	San Antonio	United States	Frost Bank Center	Charley Crockett; Nikki Lane		
October 20, 2023	Austin	United States	Moody Center	Charley Crockett; Nikki Lane		
October 21, 2023	Austin	United States	Moody Center	Charley Crockett; Nikki Lane		
October 26, 2023	Tulsa	United States	BOK Center	Charley Crockett; Nikki Lane		
October 27, 2023	Dallas	United States	Dos Equis Pavilion	Charley Crockett; Nikki Lane		
October 28, 2023	Dallas	United States	Dos Equis Pavilion	Charley Crockett; Nikki Lane		
November 11, 2023	Tampa	United States	MidFlorida Credit Union Amphitheatre	H.E.R. Imagine Dragons		
November 16, 2023	Lafayette	United States	Cajundome	Nikki Lane; Allen Stone		
November 17, 2023	The Woodlands	United States	Cynthia Woods Mitchell Pavilion	Nikki Lane; Allen Stone		
November 18, 2023	Corpus Christi	United States	American Bank Center	Nikki Lane; Allen Stone		
2024
March 1, 2024	Tempe	United States	Extra Innings Festival			
March 2, 2024	San Diego	United States	Petco Park	Turnpike Troubadours; Elle King		
April 3, 2024	Winnipeg	Canada	Canada Life Centre	The War and Treaty; Allen Stone		
April 4, 2024	Grand Forks	United States	Alerus Center	The War and Treaty; Allen Stone		
April 6, 2024	Minneapolis	United States	U.S. Bank Stadium	Lainey Wilson; Marcus King		
April 27, 2024	New Orleans	United States	New Orleans Jazz & Heritage Festival			
May 4, 2024	Indianapolis	United States	Lucas Oil Stadium	George Strait; Little Big Town		
May 9, 2024	West Palm Beach	United States	iTHINK Financial Amphitheatre	Grace Potter; Nikki Lane		
May 10, 2024	Tampa	United States	MidFlorida Credit Union Amphitheatre	Grace Potter; Nikki Lane		
May 11, 2024	Jacksonville	United States	EverBank Stadium	George Strait; Little Big Town		
May 22, 2024	Rapid City	United States	The Monument	Marcus King; The War and Treaty		
May 24, 2024	Sioux Falls	United States	Denny Sanford Premier Center	Marcus King; The War and Treaty		
May 25, 2024	Ames	United States	Jack Trice Stadium	George Strait; Little Big Town		
May 31, 2024	Cuyahoga Falls	United States	Blossom Music Center	Marcus King; The War and Treaty		
June 1, 2024	Charlotte	United States	Bank of America Stadium	George Strait; Little Big Town		
June 2, 2024	Lexington	United States	Railbird Festival			
June 6, 2024	Camden	United States	Freedom Mortgage Pavilion	Marcus King; Nikki Lane		
June 7, 2024	Bristow	United States	Jiffy Lube Live	Marcus King; Nikki Lane		
June 8, 2024	East Rutherford	United States	MetLife Stadium	George Strait; Little Big Town		
June 12, 2024	Kansas City	United States	T-Mobile Center	Marcus King; Allen Stone		
June 13, 2024	Ridgedale	United States	Thunder Ridge Nature Arena	Marcus King; Allen Stone		
June 15, 2024	Arlington	United States	Globe Life Field	Tedeschi Trucks Band; Marcus King		
June 26, 2024	Los Angeles	United States	Hollywood Bowl	Grace Potter; Allen Stone		
June 27, 2024	Los Angeles	United States	Hollywood Bowl	Grace Potter; Allen Stone		
June 29, 2024	Salt Lake City	United States	Rice–Eccles Stadium	George Strait; Little Big Town		
July 11, 2024	Darien	United States	Darien Lake Amphitheatre	Marcus King; Nikki Lane		
July 12, 2024	Burgettstown	United States	The Pavilion at Star Lake	Marcus King; Nikki Lane		
July 13, 2024	Detroit	United States	Ford Field	George Strait; Little Big Town		
July 18, 2024	Toledo	United States	Huntington Center	Marcus King; Nikki Lane		
July 19, 2024	Columbus	United States	Schottenstein Center	Marcus King; Nikki Lane		
July 20, 2024	Chicago	United States	Soldier Field	George Strait; Little Big Town		
July 25, 2024	Nampa	United States	Ford Idaho Center Arena	Allen Stone; Nikki Lane		
July 26, 2024	Ridgefield	United States	RV Inn Style Resorts Amphitheater	Allen Stone; Nikki Lane		
July 27, 2024	Seattle	United States	T-Mobile Park	Willie Nelson; Sheryl Crow		
August 1, 2024	Gilford	United States	Bank of New Hampshire Pavilion	Grace Potter; Allen Stone		
August 2, 2024	Gilford	United States	Bank of New Hampshire Pavilion	Grace Potter; Allen Stone		
August 3, 2024	Gilford	United States	Bank of New Hampshire Pavilion	Grace Potter; Allen Stone		
August 9, 2024	Nashville	United States	Bridgestone Arena	Marty Stuart; Nikki Lane		
August 10, 2024	Nashville	United States	Bridgestone Arena	Marty Stuart; Nikki Lane		
August 21, 2024	Birmingham	United States	Legacy Arena	Grace Potter; Allen Stone		
August 22, 2024	North Little Rock	United States	Simmons Bank Arena	Grace Potter; Allen Stone		
August 24, 2024	Houston	United States	Minute Maid Park	Miranda Lambert; Grace Potter		
October 3, 2024	Austin	United States	Moody Theater			
October 4, 2024	Austin	United States	Austin City Limits Music Festival			
October 11, 2024	Austin	United States	Austin City Limits Music Festival			
October 16, 2024	Manchester	England	AO Arena	Marty Stuart		
October 17, 2024	Glasgow	Scotland	OVO Hydro	Marty Stuart		
October 20, 2024	Dublin	Ireland	3Arena	Marty Stuart		
October 22, 2024	Birmingham	England	Utilita Arena	Marty Stuart		
October 23, 2024	London	England	The O2	Marty Stuart		
October 24, 2024	London	England	The O2	Marty Stuart		
December 7, 2024	Paradise	United States	Allegiant Stadium	George Strait; Little Big Town		
2025
February 25, 2025	Melbourne	Australia	Rod Laver Arena	Marcus King		
February 26, 2025	Melbourne	Australia	Rod Laver Arena	Marcus King		
February 28, 2024	Brisbane	Australia	Brisbane Entertainment Centre	Marcus King		
March 1, 2025	Brisbane	Australia	Brisbane Entertainment Centre	Marcus King		
March 4, 2025	Sydney	Australia	Qudos Bank Arena	Marcus King		
March 5, 2025	Sydney	Australia	Qudos Bank Arena	Marcus King		
March 7, 2025	Auckland	New Zealand	Spark Arena	Marcus King		
March 8, 2025	Auckland	New Zealand	Spark Arena	Marcus King		
May 10, 2025	Philadelphia	United States	Lincoln Financial Field	George Strait Parker McCollum		
May 31, 2025	Pittsburgh	United States	Acrisure Stadium	George Strait Parker McCollum		
June 4, 2025	Greenville	United States	Bon Secours Wellness Arena	Nikki Lane		
June 6, 2025	Charlottesville	United States	John Paul Jones Arena	Nikki Lane		
June 7, 2025	Charlottesville	United States	John Paul Jones Arena	Brittney Spencer		
June 12, 2025	Grand Rapids	United States	Van Andel Arena	Mike Campbell		
June 13, 2025	Grand Rapids	United States	Van Andel Arena	Mike Campbell		
June 14, 2025	Buffalo	United States	Highmark Stadium	George Strait Parker McCollum		
June 18, 2025	Greensboro	United States	First Horizon Coliseum	Maggie Rose		
June 20, 2025	Albany	United States	MVP Arena	Maggie Rose		
June 21, 2025	Foxborough	United States	Gillette Stadium	George Strait Parker McCollum		
June 27, 2025	Tinley Park	United States	Credit Union 1 Amphitheatre	The War and Treaty		
June 28, 2025	Tinley Park	United States	Credit Union 1 Amphitheatre	The War and Treaty		
July 11, 2025	Maryland Heights	United States	Hollywood Casino Amphitheatre	Brittney Spencer		
July 12, 2025	Milwaukee	United States	Harley-Davidson Homecoming Festival			
July 19, 2025	Inglewood	United States	SoFi Stadium	George Strait; Parker McCollum		
July 23, 2025	Elmont	United States	UBS Arena	Grace Potter		
July 25, 2025	New York City	United States	Madison Square Garden	Grace Potter		
July 26, 2025	New York City	United States	Madison Square Garden	Grace Potter		
August 1, 2025	Noblesville	United States	Ruoff Music Center	Allen Stone		
August 2, 2025	Noblesville	United States	Ruoff Music Center	Allen Stone		
August 8, 2025	Glendale	United States	Desert Diamond Arena	Marty Stuart		
August 9, 2025	Glendale	United States	Desert Diamond Arena	Marty Stuart		
August 15, 2025	West Valley City	United States	Utah First Credit Union Amphitheatre	Marcus King		
August 16, 2025	West Valley City	United States	Utah First Credit Union Amphitheatre	Marcus King		
August 22, 2025	Denver	United States	Ball Arena	Allen Stone		
August 23, 2025	Denver	United States	Ball Arena	Allen Stone		
September 19, 2025	Ashland	United States	Healing Appalachia			
2026
January 10, 2026	Hollywood	United States	Hard Rock Live			
January 11, 2026	Hollywood	United States	Hard Rock Live			
February 4, 2026	Las Vegas	United States	Dolby Live at Park MGM			
February 5, 2026	Las Vegas	United States	Dolby Live at Park MGM			
February 7, 2026	San Francisco	United States	Bill Graham Civic Auditorium	Sierra Ferrell		
February 20, 2026	Thackerville	United States	WinStar Lucas Oil Live			
February 21, 2026	Thackerville	United States	WinStar Lucas Oil Live			
February 27, 2026	Uncasville	United States	Mohegan Sun Arena			
February 28, 2026	Uncasville	United States	Mohegan Sun Arena			
April 19, 2026	Georgetown	United States	Two Step Inn			
May 23, 2026	Nashville	United States	Nissan Stadium	Lainey Wilson Allen Stone		
May 29, 2026	Panama City	United States	Gulf Coast Jam			
June 11, 2026	Jacksonville	United States	Vystar Veterans Memorial Arena	Allen Stone		
June 13, 2026	Tampa	United States	Raymond James Stadium	Lainey Wilson Allen Stone		
June 17, 2026	Burgettstown	United States	The Pavilion at Star Lake	Allen Stone		
June 20, 2026	Charlotte	United States	Bank of America Stadium	Lainey Wilson Allen Stone		
June 24, 2026	Hershey	United States	Hersheypark Stadium	Grace Potter		
June 26, 2026	North Charleston	United States	North Charleston Coliseum	Grace Potter		
June 27, 2026	North Charleston	United States	North Charleston Coliseum	Grace Bowers		
July 8, 2026	Mountain View	United States	Shoreline Amphitheatre	Molly Tuttle		
July 10, 2026	Chula Vista	United States	North Island Credit Union Amphitheatre	Molly Tuttle		
July 11, 2026	Chula Vista	United States	North Island Credit Union Amphitheatre	Molly Tuttle		
July 14, 2026	Paso Robles	United States	Paso Robles Event Center	Molly Tuttle		
July 17, 2026	Portland	United States	Providence Park	Grace Potter		
July 19, 2026	Whitefish	United States	Under the Big Sky Festival			
July 22, 2026	Vancouver	Canada	Rogers Arena	The Teskey Brothers		
July 24, 2026	George	United States	The Gorge Amphitheatre	Grace Potter		
July 25, 2026	George	United States	The Gorge Amphitheatre	Grace Potter		
July 29, 2026	Shakopee	United States	Mystic Lake Amphitheatre	Allen Stone		
July 30, 2026	Shakopee	United States	Mystic Lake Amphitheatre	Allen Stone		
August 1, 2026	Cincinnati	United States	Paycor Stadium	Lainey Wilson Allen Stone		
August 6, 2026	Toronto	Canada	Rogers Stadium	Zach Top Allen Stone		
August 8, 2026	Detroit	United States	Ford Field	Lainey Wilson Allen Stone		
August 14, 2026	Boston	United States	Fenway Park	Zach Top Allen Stone		
August 15, 2026	Boston	United States	Fenway Park	Zach Top Allen Stone		
August 18, 2026	Virginia Beach	United States	Veterans United Home Loans Amphitheater	Maggie Rose		
August 19, 2026	Richmond	United States	Allianz Amphitheatre at Riverfront	Maggie Rose		
August 21, 2026	Atlanta	United States	Mercedes-Benz Stadium	Lainey Wilson Ashley McBryde		
August 26, 2026	Wantagh	United States	Northwell Health at Jones Beach Theater	Carter Faith		
August 28, 2026	Camden	United States	Freedom Mortgage Pavilion	Carter Faith		
August 29, 2026	Camden	United States	Freedom Mortgage Pavilion	Carter Faith		
September 1, 2026	Toronto	Canada	Rogers Stadium	Zach Top Ashley McBryde		
September 26, 2026	Louisville	United States	Bourbon & Beyond			
October 2, 2026	Bristow	United States	Jiffy Lube Live	Mike Campbell		
October 3, 2026	Ocean City	United States	Country Calling Festival			
October 7, 2026	Lincoln	United States	Pinnacle Bank Arena	Nikki Lane		
October 9, 2026	Riverside	United States	Morton Amphitheater	Nikki Lane		
October 10, 2026	Riverside	United States	Morton Amphitheater	Nikki Lane		

Cancelled Shows

Date	City	Country	Venue	Reason
August 7, 2021	Notre Dame	United States	Notre Dame Stadium	Coronavirus pandemic
September 3, 2021	Napa	United States	BottleRock Napa Valley	Illness
October 1, 2021	Atlantic City	United States	Boardwalk Hall	Coronavirus pandemic
