= Rogers Stadium (disambiguation) =

Rogers Stadium is a temporary open-air concert venue in the Downsview neighbourhood of Toronto, Ontario, Canada.

Rogers Stadium may also refer to:

- Rogers Stadium, the home football stadium of the Virginia State Trojans in Petersburg, Virginia, U.S.

== See also ==
- Rogers Arena, an indoor arena in Vancouver, British Columbia, Canada
- Rogers Centre, a retractable-roof stadium in Toronto, Ontario, Canada
- Rogers Centre Ottawa, a convention centre in Ottawa, Ontario, Canada
- Rogers Place, an indoor arena in Edmonton, Alberta, Canada
