= 51st Academy of Country Music Awards =

US music awards ceremony in 2016

- Date: April 3, 2016
- Location: MGM Grand, Las Vegas, Nevada
- Hosted by: Luke Bryan; Dierks Bentley

Highlights
- Most wins: Chris Stapleton (4)
- Most nominations: Eric Church; Chris Stapleton; (5 each)

Television/radio coverage
- Network: CBS

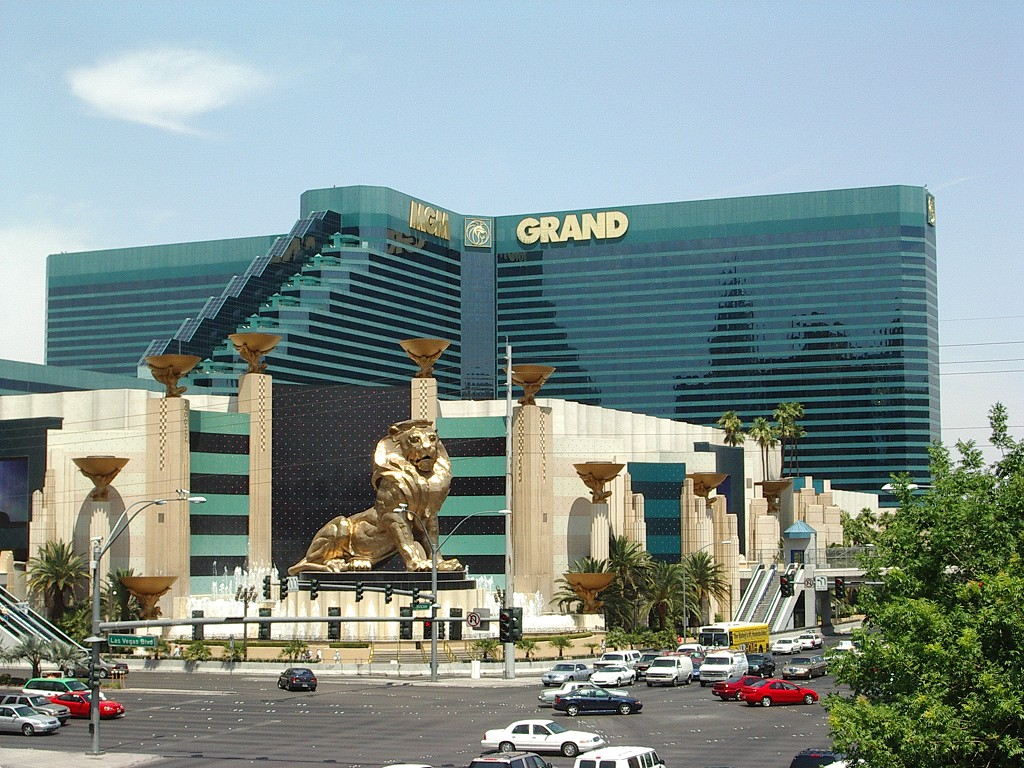
Exterior of the MGM Grand in Las Vegas.

The 51st Academy of Country Music Awards were held on April 3, 2016, at the MGM Grand in Las Vegas, Nevada. Luke Bryan returned to host the show for his fourth consecutive year, with Dierks Bentley as his newest co-host.

== Background ==
Previously, some categories including Entertainer of the Year, New Male Vocalist of the Year, New Female Vocalist of the Year, and New Duo or Group of the Year were voted directly by fans. Beginning with the 2016 awards show, these became incorporated into a professional membership voting process.Nominations were announced on February 1, 2016.

== Winners and nominees ==
The winners are shown in bold.

Entertainer of the Year	Album of the Year
**Jason Aldean**; Garth Brooks; Luke Bryan; Eric Church; Miranda Lambert	**Traveller — Chris Stapleton**; I'm Comin' Over — Chris Young; Montevallo — Sam Hunt; Mr. Misunderstood — Eric Church; Tangled Up — Thomas Rhett
Female Artist of the Year	Male Artist of the Year
**Miranda Lambert**; Kelsea Ballerini; Jana Kramer; Kacey Musgraves; Carrie Underwood	**Chris Stapleton**; Jason Aldean; Dierks Bentley; Eric Church; Brett Eldredge
Group of the Year	Duo of the Year
**Little Big Town**; Eli Young Band; Old Dominion; Rascal Flatts; Zac Brown Band	**Florida Georgia Line**; Brothers Osborne; Dan + Shay; Joey + Rory; Maddie & Tae
Single of the Year	Song of the Year
**"Die a Happy Man" — Thomas Rhett**; "Burning House" — Cam; "Buy Me a Boat" — Chris Janson; "I'm Comin' Over" — Chris Young; "Take Your Time" — Sam Hunt	**"Nobody to Blame – Barry Bales, Ronnie Bowman, Chris Stapleton**; "Girl Crush" – Hillary Lindsey, Lori McKenna, Liz Rose; "Burning House" – Jeff Bhasker, Cam, Tyler Johnson; "Raise 'Em Up" – Tom Douglas, Jaren Johnston, Jeffrey Steele; "She Don't Love You" – Eric Paslay & Jennifer Wayne
New Female Artist of the Year	New Male Artist of the Year
**Kelsea Ballerini**; Cam; Mickey Guyton; RaeLynn	**Chris Stapleton**; Brett Eldredge; Chris Janson; Thomas Rhett; Chase Rice
New Vocal Duo or Group of the Year	Video of the Year
**Old Dominion**; A Thousand Horses; Brothers Osborne; Maddie & Tae; Parmalee	**"Mr. Misunderstood" — Eric Church**; "Biscuits" — Kacey Musgraves; "Burning House" — Cam; "Girl Crush" — Little Big Town; "Riser" — Dierks Bentley
Vocal Event of the Year
**"Smokin' and Drinkin'" — Miranda Lambert (feat. Little Big Town)**; "Hangover Tonight" — Gary Allan (feat. Chris Stapleton); "Home Alone Tonight" — Luke Bryan (feat. Karen Fairchild); "Raise 'Em Up" — Keith Urban (feat. Eric Church); "Wild Child" — Kenny Chesney and Grace Potter

== Performances ==
Artist(s)	Song(s)
Luke Bryan	"Huntin', Fishin' and Lovin' Every Day"
Blake Shelton	"Came Here to Forget"
Old Dominion	"Snapback"
Kenny Chesney	"Noise"
Chris Young & Cassadee Pope	"Think of You"
Eric Church	"Record Year"
Dierks Bentley	"Somewhere on a Beach"
Cam	"Burning House"
Jason Aldean	"Lights Come On"
Cole Swindell	"You Should Be Here"
Brett Eldredge	"Drunk on Your Love"
Keith Urban	"Wasted Time"
Little Big Town and Trombone Shorty	"Stay All Night"
Kelsea Ballerini feat. Nick Jonas	"Peter Pan"
Tim McGraw	"Humble and Kind"
Charles Kelley	"Lonely Girl"
Carrie Underwood	"Church Bells"
Sam Hunt	"Make You Miss Me"
Thomas Rhett	"Die a Happy Man"
Miranda Lambert feat. Billy Gibbons & Keith Urban	"Tush"
Dolly Parton and Katy Perry	"Coat of Many Colors", "Jolene", "9 to 5"
Florida Georgia Line	"Confession"
Chris Stapleton	"Fire Away"
