= Academy of Country Music Award for Entertainer of the Year =

Annual US country music award

- Country: United States
- Presented by: Academy of Country Music
- First award: 1970
- Currently held by: Cody Johnson (61st)

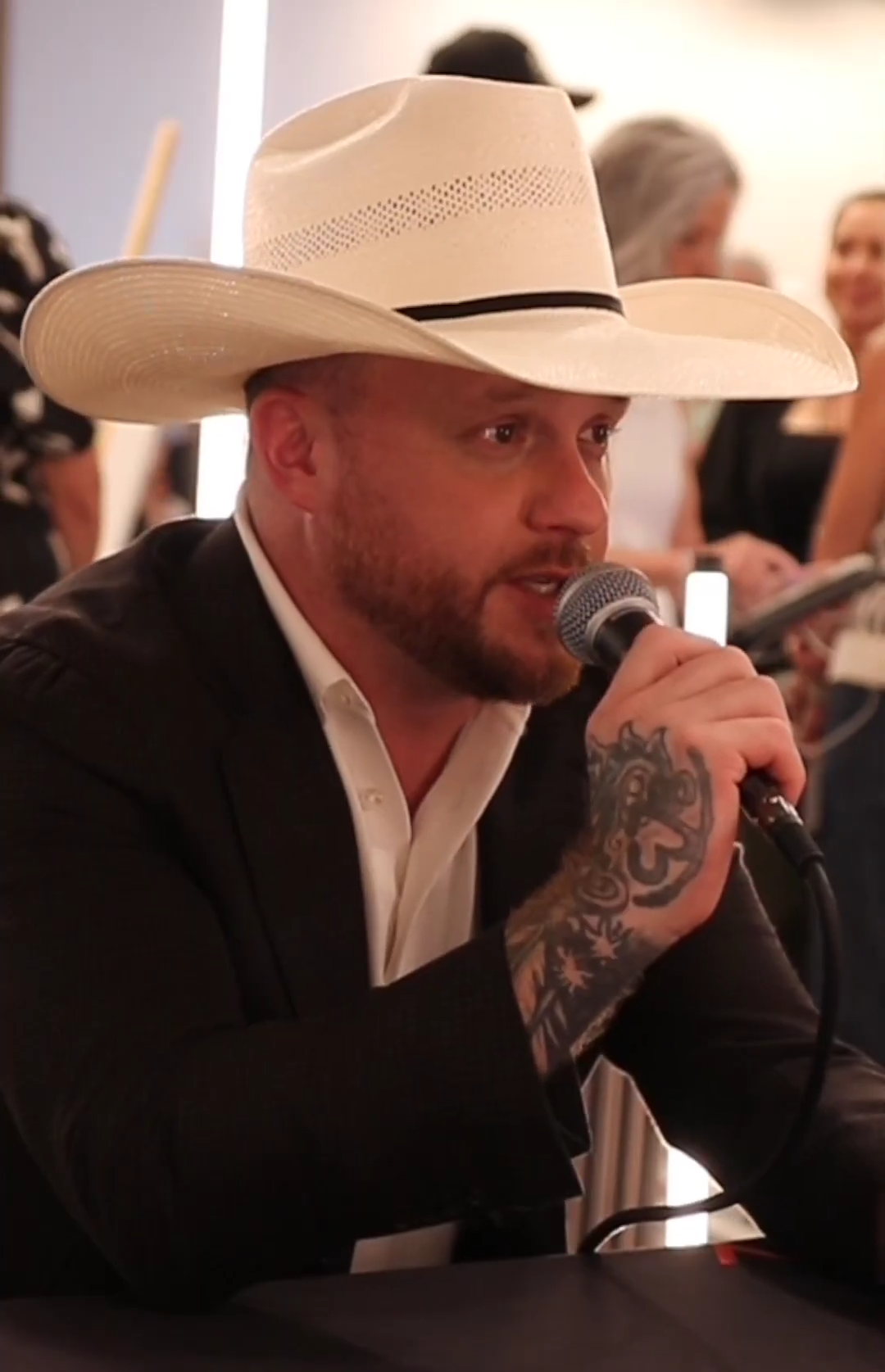
Cody Johnson, the 2026 reigning Entertainer of the Year.

The Academy of Country Music Award for Entertainer of the Year is the biggest competitive category presented at the Academy of Country Music Awards. The award has been given annually since 1970, and is the final award presented at the ceremony.

During the 52 nomination years, 60 artists have been nominated for the Entertainer of the Year; 27 of these have won, including co-winners and ties. Of these, Garth Brooks has received the most awards, with six awards out of 13 nominations. The two artists who have won more than three times are Alabama with 5 out of 10 nominations and Kenny Chesney with 5 out of 11. The two artists who have won three times are Carrie Underwood with 3 out of 6 nominations, and Brooks & Dunn with 3 out of 12 nominations. George Strait and Reba McEntire have received the most nominations; Strait won 2 out of 14 nominations and McEntire won 1 out of 9 nominations.

== Winners and nominees ==
In the following tables, the years correspond to the date of the ceremony. Artists are eligible based on their work of the previous calendar year. Entries with a blue ribbon next to the artist's name have won the award; those with a white background are the nominees on the short-list.

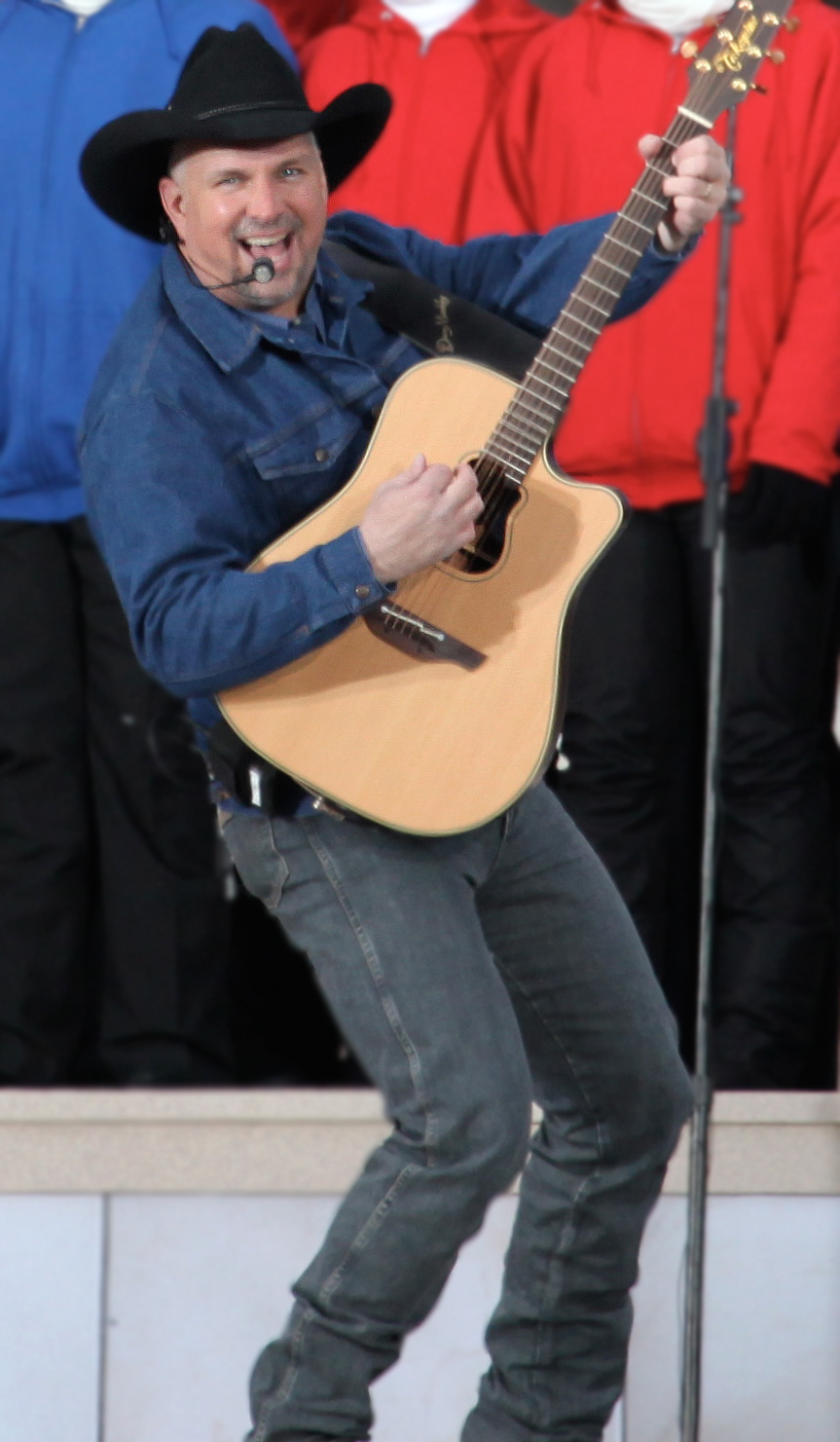
Six-time winner Garth Brooks.

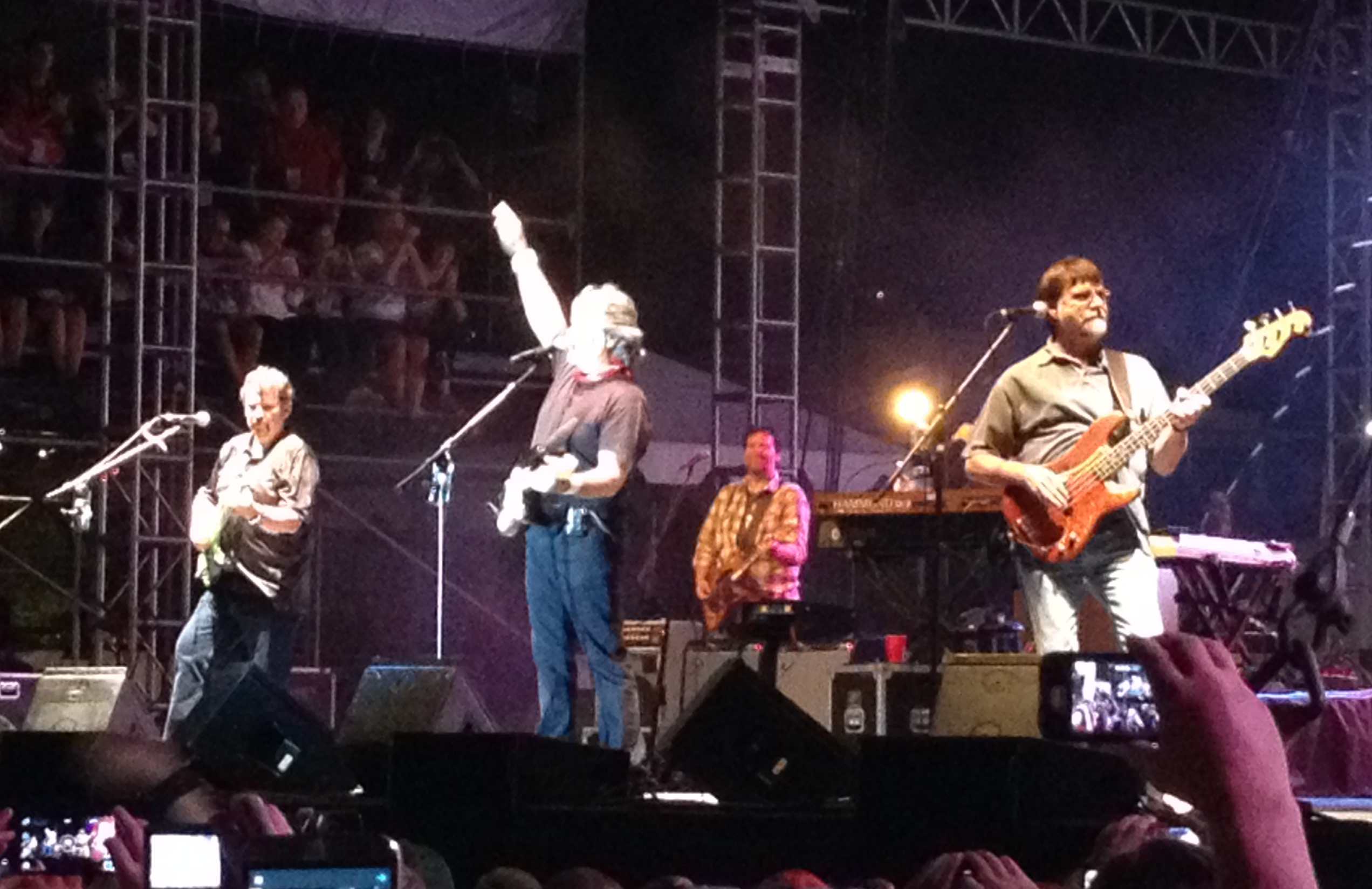
Five-time winners Alabama.

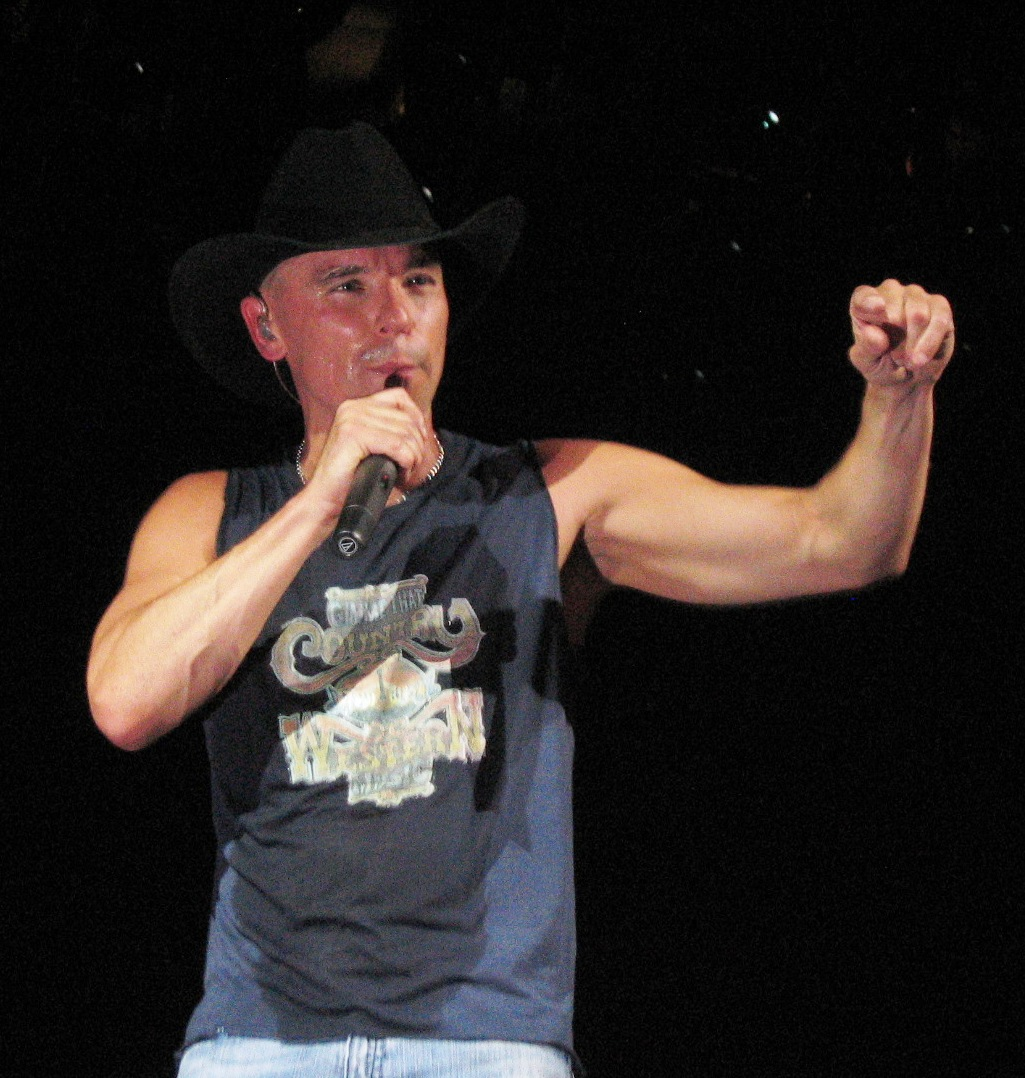
Four-time winner Kenny Chesney.

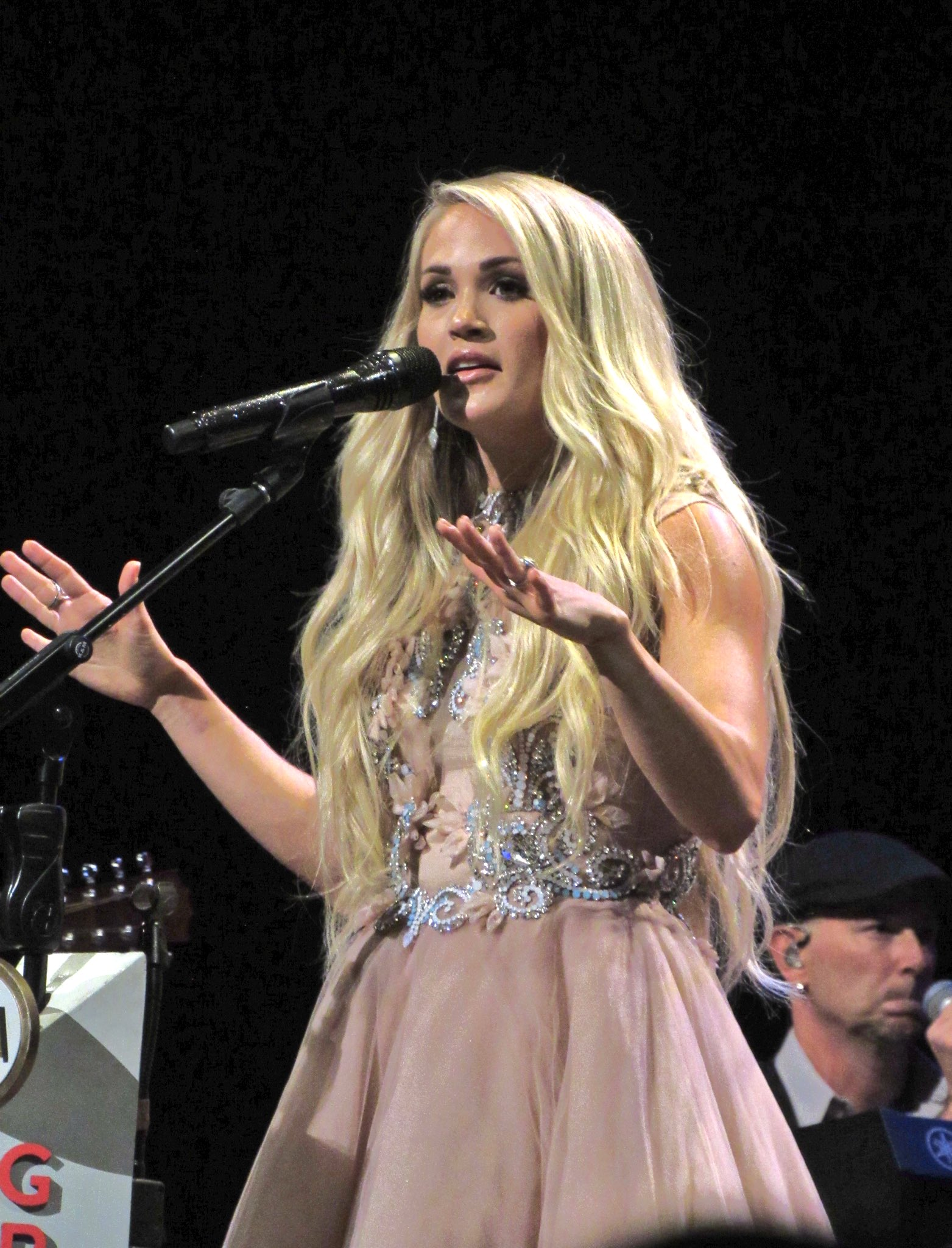
Three-time winner Carrie Underwood.

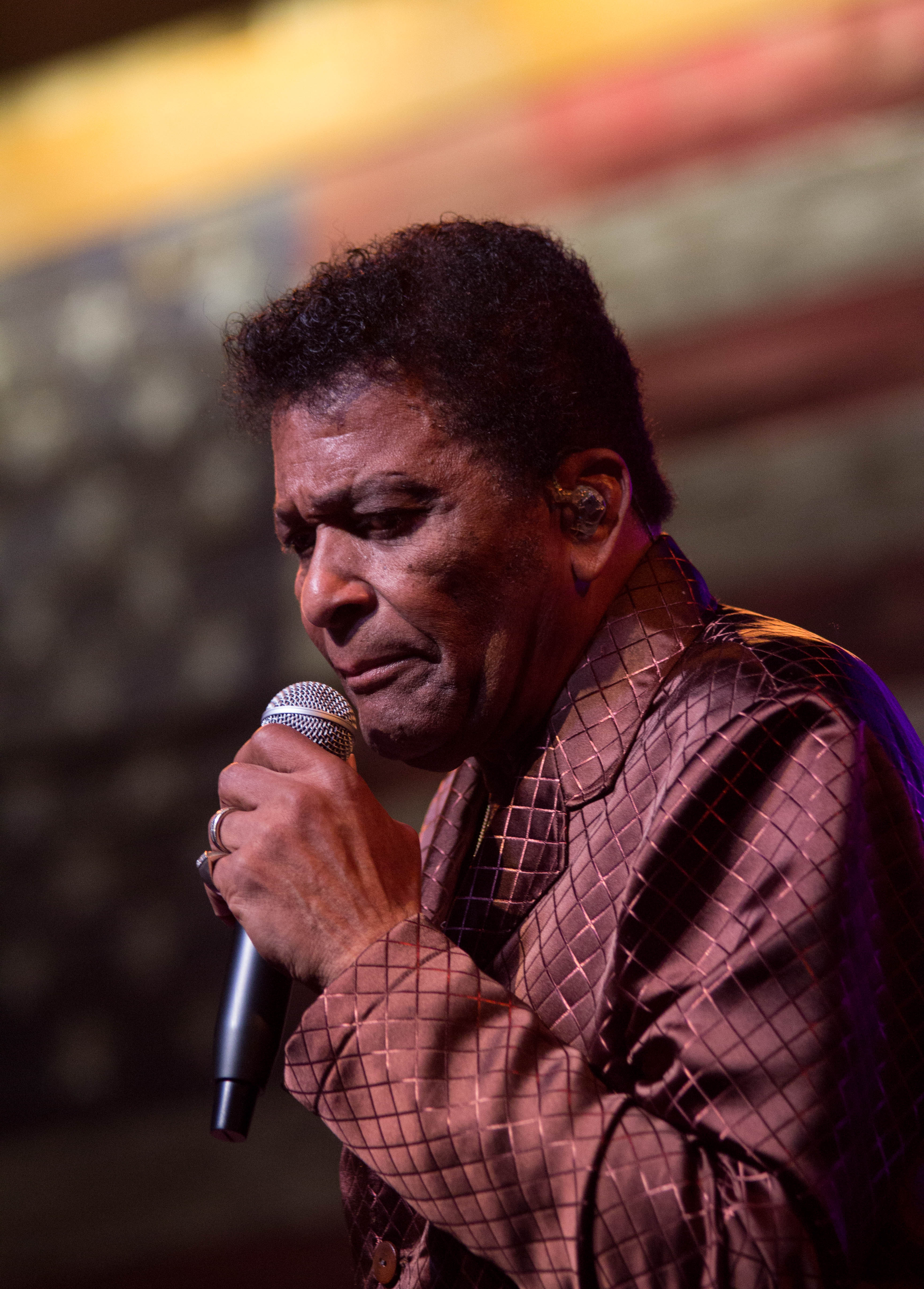
Charley Pride, the first black artist to be nominated for Entertainer of the Year.

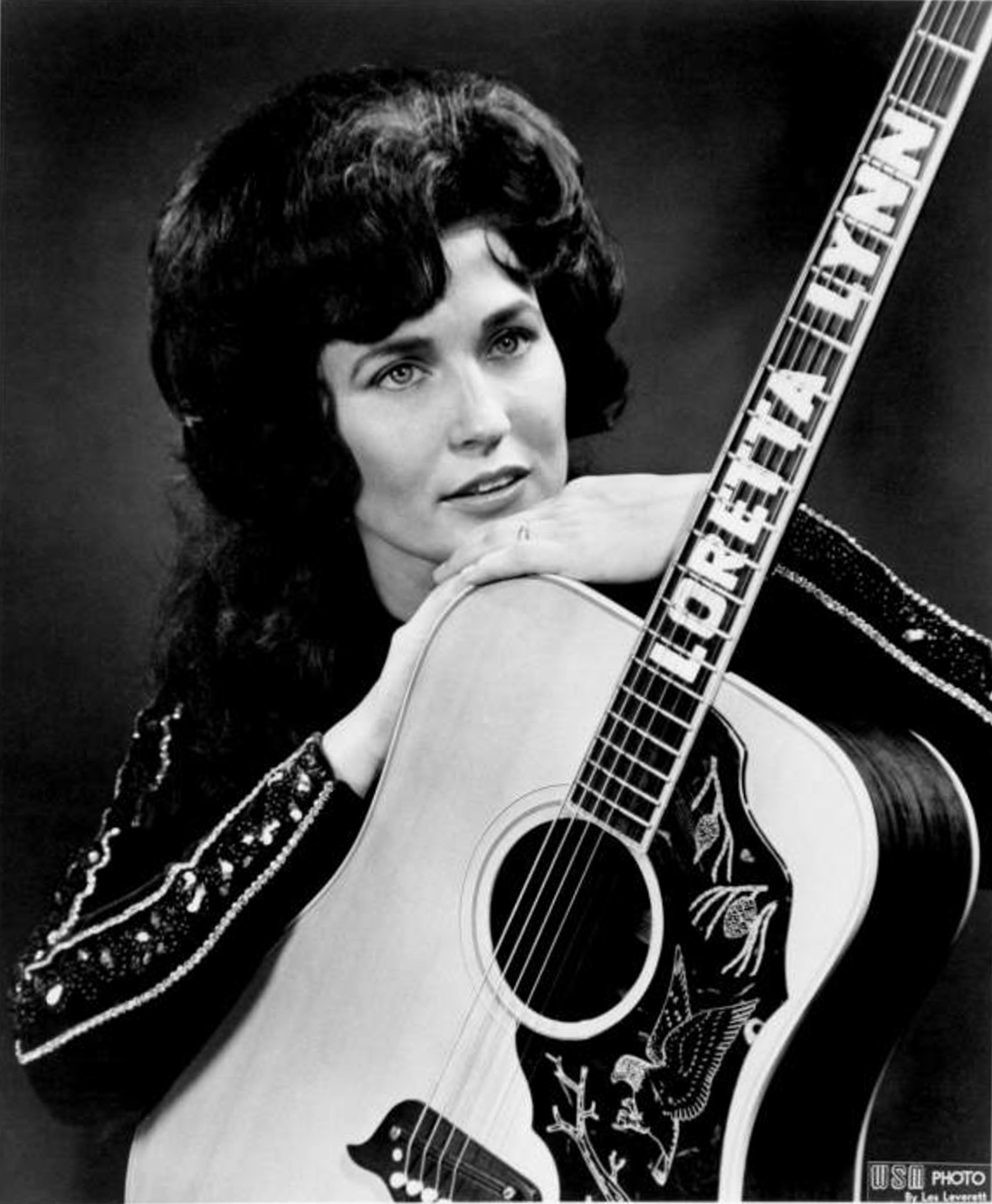
Loretta Lynn, the first woman to be nominated and win the award

Year	Winner	Nominees
2026	Cody Johnson	Luke Combs; Jelly Roll; Megan Moroney; Chris Stapleton; Morgan Wallen; Lainey Wilson
2025	Lainey Wilson	Kelsea Ballerini; Luke Combs; Cody Johnson; Jelly Roll; Chris Stapleton; Morgan Wallen
2024	Lainey Wilson	Kane Brown; Luke Combs; Jelly Roll; Cody Johnson; Chris Stapleton; Morgan Wallen
2023	Chris Stapleton	Jason Aldean; Kane Brown; Luke Combs; Miranda Lambert; Carrie Underwood; Morgan Wallen
2022	Miranda Lambert	Eric Church; Luke Combs; Chris Stapleton; Carrie Underwood
2021	Luke Bryan	Eric Church; Luke Combs; Thomas Rhett; Chris Stapleton
2020	Carrie Underwood; Thomas Rhett	Luke Bryan; Eric Church; Luke Combs
2019	Keith Urban	Jason Aldean; Luke Bryan; Kenny Chesney; Chris Stapleton
2018	Jason Aldean	Garth Brooks; Luke Bryan; Chris Stapleton; Keith Urban
2017	Jason Aldean	Luke Bryan; Florida Georgia Line; Carrie Underwood; Keith Urban
2016	Jason Aldean	Garth Brooks; Luke Bryan; Eric Church; Miranda Lambert
2015	Luke Bryan (Note: From 2008 to 2015, 'Entertainer of the Year' was decided by a combination of ACM professional membership and fan votes cast online and via text message.)	Jason Aldean; Luke Bryan; Miranda Lambert; Florida Georgia Line
2014	George Strait	Luke Bryan; Miranda Lambert; Blake Shelton; Taylor Swift
2013	Luke Bryan	Jason Aldean; Miranda Lambert; Blake Shelton; Taylor Swift
2012	Taylor Swift	Jason Aldean; Kenny Chesney; Brad Paisley; Blake Shelton
2011	Taylor Swift	Jason Aldean; Toby Keith; Brad Paisley; Keith Urban; Miranda Lambert
2010	Carrie Underwood	Kenny Chesney; Toby Keith; Brad Paisley; George Strait; Taylor Swift; Keith Urban; Zac Brown Band
2009	Carrie Underwood	Kenny Chesney; Brad Paisley; George Strait; Keith Urban
2008	Kenny Chesney	Brad Paisley; Rascal Flatts; George Strait; Keith Urban
2007	Kenny Chesney	Brooks & Dunn; George Strait; Tim McGraw; Rascal Flatts
2006	Kenny Chesney	Brooks & Dunn; Toby Keith; Tim McGraw; Rascal Flatts
2005	Kenny Chesney	Brooks & Dunn; Toby Keith; Tim McGraw; Keith Urban
2004	Toby Keith	Brooks & Dunn; Kenny Chesney; Alan Jackson; Tim McGraw
2003	Toby Keith	Brooks & Dunn; Kenny Chesney; Dixie Chicks; Alan Jackson
2002	Brooks & Dunn	Garth Brooks; Alan Jackson; Toby Keith; Tim McGraw
2001	Dixie Chicks	Brooks & Dunn; Faith Hill; George Strait; Toby Keith
2000	Shania Twain	Dixie Chicks; Faith Hill; Sawyer Brown; Tim McGraw
1999	Garth Brooks	Brooks & Dunn; George Strait; Shania Twain; Tim McGraw
1998	Garth Brooks	Brooks & Dunn; George Strait; Reba McEntire; Tim McGraw
1997	Brooks & Dunn	Alan Jackson; Garth Brooks; George Strait; Tim McGraw
1996	Brooks & Dunn	Alan Jackson; Garth Brooks; Reba McEntire; Tim McGraw
1995	Reba McEntire	Alabama; Alan Jackson; Brooks & Dunn; Garth Brooks
1994	Garth Brooks	Alan Jackson; Clint Black; Reba McEntire; Travis Tritt
1993	Garth Brooks	Alan Jackson; Billy Ray Cyrus; Reba McEntire; Travis Tritt
1992	Garth Brooks	Alan Jackson; Clint Black; Randy Travis; Reba McEntire
1991	Garth Brooks	Clint Black; Dolly Parton; George Strait; Reba McEntire
1990	George Strait	Alabama; Dolly Parton; Hank Williams Jr.; Randy Travis
1989	Hank Williams Jr.	Alabama; George Strait; Randy Travis; The Judds
1988	Hank Williams Jr.	Alabama; Randy Travis; Reba McEntire; Willie Nelson
1987	Hank Williams Jr.	Alabama; George Strait; Reba McEntire; Ricky Skaggs
1986	Alabama	George Strait; Hank Williams Jr.; Lee Greenwood; Ricky Skaggs
1985	Alabama	Hank Williams Jr.; Oak Ridge Boys; Ricky Skaggs; Willie Nelson
1984	Alabama	Barbara Mandrell; Hank Williams Jr.; Oak Ridge Boys; Willie Nelson
1983	Alabama	Barbara Mandrell; Kenny Rogers; Ricky Skaggs; Willie Nelson
1982	Alabama	Barbara Mandrell; Dolly Parton; Kenny Rogers; Oak Ridge Boys
1981	Barbara Mandrell	Dolly Parton; Eddie Rabbitt; Kenny Rogers; Willie Nelson
1980	Willie Nelson	Crystal Gayle; Kenny Rogers; Loretta Lynn; Waylon Jennings
1979	Kenny Rogers	Dolly Parton; Loretta Lynn; Roy Clark; Willie Nelson
1978	Dolly Parton	Kenny Rogers; Loretta Lynn; Mel Tillis; Roy Clark
1977	Mickey Gilley	Conway Twitty; Loretta Lynn; Marty Robbins; Mel Tillis
1976	Loretta Lynn	Glen Campbell; John Denver; Mickey Gilley; Roy Clark
1975	Mac Davis	Loretta Lynn; Merle Haggard; Ronnie Milsap; Roy Clark
1974	Roy Clark	Merle Haggard; Charlie Rich; Johnny Rodriguez; Mel Tillis
1973	Roy Clark	Merle Haggard; Freddie Hart; Loretta Lynn; Charley Pride
1972	Freddie Hart	Glen Campbell; Merle Haggard; Loretta Lynn; Charley Pride
1971	Merle Haggard	Johnny Cash; Glen Campbell; Elvis Presley; Charley Pride

== Category Records ==
=== Wins ===
Artist with the most wins — Garth Brooks (6).

- Male artist with most wins — Garth Brooks (6).
- Female artist with most wins — Carrie Underwood (3).
- Group with most wins — Alabama (5).
- Duo with the most wins — Brooks & Dunn (3).

=== Nominations ===
Artist with the most nominations — George Strait (14).

- Male artist with most nominations — George Strait (14).
- Female artist with most nominations — Reba McEntire (9).
- Group with most nominations — Alabama (10).
- Duo with the most nominations — Brooks & Dunn (12).

== See also ==
- Country Music Association Award for Entertainer of the Year
