= Traveller (Chris Stapleton album) =

Studio album by Chris Stapleton
- Released: May 5, 2015
- Studios: Historic RCA Studio A (Nashville, Tennessee); Blackbird (Nashville, Tennessee)
- Genres: Country; rock; country rock; Southern rock; soul
- Length: 63:04
- Label: Mercury Nashville
- Producers: Dave Cobb; Stapleton

Chris Stapleton chronology
Traveller (2015)	From A Room: Volume 1 (2017)

Singles from Traveller
- 1. "Traveller" Released: April 27, 2015; 2. "Nobody to Blame" Released: November 9, 2015; 3. "Parachute" Released: May 2, 2016

Traveller is the debut studio album by American singer-songwriter Chris Stapleton. The album was produced by Dave Cobb and Stapleton, and was released on May 5, 2015, through Mercury Nashville.

Described by music publications as an old-school country, Southern rock record, Traveller received critical acclaim and earned Stapleton several awards. It was named Album of the Year at the 2015 Country Music Association Awards. Furthermore, it received a nomination at the 58th Grammy Awards for Album of the Year and a win for Best Country Album. The song "Traveller" also won Best Country Solo Performance. At the 2016 Academy of Country Music Awards it won Album of the Year, with the song "Nobody to Blame" also winning Song of the Year. It won the Billboard Music Award for Top Country Album in 2016 and 2017.

Traveller reached number one on the US Billboard 200 chart after the 2015 Country Music Association Awards, during which Stapleton and Justin Timberlake performed a well-received duet. The album has been certified quadruple platinum by the Recording Industry Association of America (RIAA) and has sold over 2.6 million copies in the United States by November 2019. It was eventually ranked by Billboard as the bestselling country album of the 2010s. It generated three singles: "Traveller", "Nobody to Blame", and "Parachute". "Nobody to Blame" reached the top 10 on the Country Airplay chart. The album track "Fire Away" was accompanied by a music video. Though not released as a radio single, the album track "Tennessee Whiskey" garnered popularity following its performance at the aforementioned CMA awards, reaching number one on the Billboard Hot Country Songs chart and number 20 on the Hot 100.

== Music and composition ==
I lost my dad in October 2013 and did a little bit of soul-searching. My wife was kind enough to buy me an old Jeep. We flew out to Phoenix and drove it all the way back to Nashville through the desert. I thought a lot about music and my dad, and the things that he would have liked that I should be doing. Out of that, I actually wrote the song 'Traveller' driving down Interstate 40 through New Mexico. That became the cornerstone for the record and wound up being the title track.

— Stapleton speaking about his inspiration for the album during an interview with Billboard

The album is an old-school country record mixed with Southern rock. Tracks on the album feature electric guitar, mandolin, and acoustic guitar. "The Devil Named Music" exclaims the hard life on the road, while "Might As Well Get Stoned" features resignation lyrics. Musically, "Sometimes I Cry" is a blues song, "Nobody to Blame" is a mid-tempo country rock track, and "Fire Away" features a beat in a classic soul-ballad time signature. "Daddy Doesn't Pray Anymore" shrouds reflections about his father in the language of religious backsliding, which was previously covered by Julie Roberts in 2013. In an interview for Rolling Stone, Stapleton commented "If somebody tells me it sounds dated, I'd say that's great, as long as the date is 1978. My favorite things are from then."

Stapleton wrote or co-wrote all but two of the album's 14 tracks. The album features a blues-influenced cover of David Allan Coe's single "Tennessee Whiskey", and Charlie Daniels' "Was It 26", written by Don Sampson.

The track "Whiskey and You" was previously recorded by Tim McGraw on his 2007 album Let It Go.

== Recording ==
Producer Dave Cobb originally intended to record the album at Sound Emporium Studios in Nashville, but it was already booked. Cobb had read reports of the impending demolition of the historic RCA Studio A building and its Grand Victor Sound studios, and decided to record Stapleton's debut studio album there, before the building and its recording studios were gone forever.

== Commercial performance ==
The album debuted on the Top Country Albums chart at number two, and the Billboard 200 at number 14, selling 27,000 copies in the week ending May 10.

Six months after the album was released, Chris Stapleton and Justin Timberlake performed "Tennessee Whiskey" at the 2015 Country Music Association Awards where Traveller won Album of the Year. Following the performance, sales for the album increased 6,000% and it re-entered the Billboard 200 at number one after being absent from the chart since September, with 177,000 equivalent album units (153,000 in pure album sales). According to Billboard, the surge in sales is owed to how a mass audience discovered Stapleton on the November 4 CMA Awards broadcast. Traveller is also the first debut country album to reach number one on the Billboard 200 in over four years, with Clear as Day (2011) by Scotty McCreery being the last. It became the first album to reenter the chart at number one. It remained at number one for a second week with 124,000 album-equivalent units, including 97,000 pure album sales. The album track "Tennessee Whiskey" topped the Hot Country Songs chart, and reached the top 20 on the Billboard Hot 100.

The album sold 685,000 copies in the United States in 2015. In February 2016, Traveller was certified platinum by the Recording Industry Association of America (RIAA), and double platinum in September. It became the fourth best-selling album of 2016 in the nation, and the top selling country album, with 1.04 million copies sold that year. The album surpassed the 2 million sales mark in the US in July 2017, and it was the second best-selling country album of 2017 (after Stapleton's second album From A Room: Volume 1. It hold the records for the most weeks atop the Americana/Folk Albums chart (81 in total as of August 2019). It topped the Billboard Year-End Top Country Albums chart in 2016 and 2017. It was certified quadruple platinum on July 24, 2019, for 4 million units in sales and streams. As of March 2020, the album has accrued 4.3 million units in the country in total, with 2.6 million copies in traditional album sales.

== Critical reception ==
Professional ratings
Aggregate scores
Source	Rating
Metacritic	85/100
Review scores
Source	Rating
AbsolutePunk	9/10 stars
AllMusic	5/5 stars
Billboard	4/5 stars
Digital Journal	A
Exclaim!	9/10
NPR	(Favorable)
The Daily Telegraph	4/5 stars
Wall Street Journal	(Favorable)

Traveller received critical acclaim upon its release. At Metacritic, which assigns a normalized rating out of 100 to reviews from music critics, the album has received an average score of 85, indicating "universal acclaim", based on 6 reviews. In a review for Billboard, editor Caitlin White gave the album four-out-of-five stars, describing Traveller as a "solemn album, the work of a man gripped by life's impermanence", noting "undercurrents of regret, loss and resignation" in songs like "Daddy Doesn't Pray Anymore", "Nobody to Blame" and "Devil Named Music". About the record's sound direction, she commented "Stapleton's songs are both rhythmic and nuanced, perhaps a by-product of years spent writing for others. They feature a cast of characters that remain likable even as they rush headlong into pursuit of ruin, fortune or chance." White concluded "it's a triumphant debut, encapsulating the grit of life, turning it into a hell of a journey." In Los Angeles Times, Randy Lewis wrote "Stapleton's trenchant pen combines with his soul-drenched rasp of a voice for a moving exploration of the panoply of emotions in the human experience."

Critics from Rolling Stone opined Traveller "encapsulates everything that makes him one of the most powerful and unique voices in country music today: gravelly, soulful and full of songs that ring like instant classics without ever resting too deeply in the past." In their year-end summary they stated "every track goes straight for the emotional jugular and give a glimpse inside a wildly introspective mind." Editor Owen R. Smith from The Seattle Times noted the instruments mandolin, banjo, pedal steel guitar "are all given room to shine, even when Stapleton dips his toe into some menacing country rock in "Nobody to Blame" or electrified bluesy swagger in "Might As Well Get Stoned.""

=== Accolades ===
Publication	List	Rank	Ref.
American Songwriter	Top 50 Albums of 2015	1	
Billboard	25 Best Albums of 2015	13	
Brooklyn Magazine	The Best of 2015	no order	
Brooklyn Magazine	The 20 Best Country Albums of 2015	2	
Entertainment Weekly	The 40 Best Albums of 2015	7	
NPR	50 Favorite Albums of 2015	no order	
Rolling Stone	50 Best Albums of 2015	21	
Rolling Stone	40 Best Country Albums of 2015	3	
Stereogum	The 50 Best Albums of 2015	43	

== Awards ==
Year	Award	Category	Result	Ref.
2015	Country Music Association Awards	Album of the Year	Won	
2016	Grammy Awards	Album of the Year	Nominated	
2016	Grammy Awards	Best Country Album	Won	
2016	Academy of Country Music Awards	Album of the Year	Won	
2016	Billboard Music Awards	Top Country Album	Won	
2016	American Country Countdown Awards	Album of the Year	Won	
2016	Americana Music Honors & Awards	Album of the Year	Nominated	
2016	American Music Awards	Favorite Country Album	Nominated	
2017	iHeartRadio Music Awards	Country Album of the Year	Won	
2017	Billboard Music Awards	Top Country Album	Won	

== Track listing ==
All tracks are produced by Dave Cobb and Chris Stapleton.

No.	Title	Writer(s)	Length
1.	"Traveller"	Chris Stapleton	3:42
2.	"Fire Away"	Stapleton; Danny Green	4:04
3.	"Tennessee Whiskey"	Dean Dillon; Linda Hargrove	4:53
4.	"Parachute"	Stapleton; Jim Beavers	4:13
5.	"Whiskey and You"	Stapleton; Lee Thomas Miller	3:56
6.	"Nobody to Blame"	Stapleton; Barry Bales; Ronnie Bowman	4:04
7.	"More of You"	Stapleton; Bowman	4:37
8.	"When the Stars Come Out"	Stapleton; Dan Wilson	4:16
9.	"Daddy Doesn't Pray Anymore"	Stapleton	4:09
10.	"Might as Well Get Stoned"	Stapleton; Jimmy Alan Stewart; Justin McGhee	4:37
11.	"Was It 26"	Don Sampson	4:49
12.	"The Devil Named Music"	Stapleton	6:07
13.	"Outlaw State of Mind"	Stapleton; Bowman; Jerry Salley	5:37
14.	"Sometimes I Cry"	Stapleton; Clint Ingersoll	4:00
Total length:			63:29

== Personnel ==
Credits for Traveller adapted from AllMusic.

Musicians

- Dave Cobb – acoustic guitar, percussion
- J.T. Cure – bass guitar, upright bass
- Derek Mixon – drums, percussion
- Mickey Raphael – harmonica
- Chris Stapleton – acoustic guitar, electric guitar, mandolin, lead vocals
- Morgane Stapleton – background vocals
- Robby Turner – pedal steel guitar
- Michael Webb – Mellotron, organ, piano

Technical personnel

- Steve Blackmon – assistant
- Sorrel Brigman – assistant
- Dave Cobb – producer
- Becky Fluke – photography
- Mary Hooper – design
- Pete Lyman – mastering
- Drew Long – assistant
- Vance Powell – engineer, mixing
- Ed Spear – assistant
- Chris Stapleton – producer
- Shane Stern – production coordination

== Chart performance ==
=== Weekly charts ===
Weekly chart performance for Traveller
Chart (2015–2016)	Peak position
Australian Albums (ARIA)	47
Canadian Albums (Billboard)	4
German Albums (Offizielle Top 100)	53
New Zealand Albums (RMNZ)	13
Scottish Albums (Official Charts)	36
UK Albums (Official Charts)	67
UK Country Albums (Official Charts)	1
US Billboard 200	1
US Americana/Folk Albums (Billboard)	1
US Top Country Albums (Billboard)	1

Weekly chart performance for Traveller
Chart (2020)	Peak position
Swedish Albums (Sverigetopplistan)	43

=== Year-end charts ===
Year-end chart performance for Traveller
Chart	Year	Position
US Billboard 200	2015	68
US Top Country Albums (Billboard)	2015	9
Canadian Albums (Billboard)	2016	14
US Billboard 200	2016	7
US Top Country Albums (Billboard)	2016	1
Canadian Albums (Billboard)	2017	48
US Billboard 200	2017	19
US Top Country Albums (Billboard)	2017	1
US Billboard 200	2018	34
US Top Country Albums (Billboard)	2018	4
US Billboard 200	2019	49
US Top Country Albums (Billboard)	2019	4
US Billboard 200	2020	67
US Top Country Albums (Billboard)	2020	5
US Billboard 200	2021	57
US Top Country Albums (Billboard)	2021	7
US Billboard 200	2022	47
US Top Country Albums (Billboard)	2022	6
US Billboard 200	2023	53
US Top Country Albums (Billboard)	2023	13
Australian Country Albums (ARIA)	2024	22
US Billboard 200	2024	66
US Top Country Albums (Billboard)	2024	17
US Billboard 200	2025	72
US Top Country Albums (Billboard)	2025	12

=== Decade-end charts ===
Decade-end chart performance for Traveller
Chart (2010–2019)	Position
US Billboard 200	17

== Certifications ==
Certifications for Traveller
Region	Certification	Certified units/sales
Australia (ARIA)	Gold	35,000^{‡}
Canada (Music Canada)	4× Platinum	320,000^{‡}
New Zealand (RMNZ)	2× Platinum	30,000^{‡}
Switzerland (IFPI Switzerland)	Gold	10,000^{‡}
United Kingdom (BPI)	Gold	100,000^{‡}
United States (RIAA)	7× Platinum	7,000,000^{‡}
^{‡} Sales+streaming figures based on certification alone.

== Release history ==
List of release dates, showing region, edition, formats, label, and reference
Region	Date	Edition(s)	Format(s)	Label	Ref.
Various	May 5, 2015	Standard	CD; digital download	Mercury Nashville	
United Kingdom	March 4, 2016	Standard	Vinyl	Decca	
United States	May 26, 2015	Standard	Vinyl	Mercury Nashville	
