= Parachute (Chris Stapleton song) =

Single by Chris Stapleton

from the album Traveller
- Released: May 2, 2016
- Genre: Country; country rock
- Length: 4:13
- Label: Mercury Nashville
- Songwriters: Chris Stapleton; Jim Beavers
- Producers: Dave Cobb; Chris Stapleton

Chris Stapleton singles chronology
"Nobody to Blame" (2015)	"Parachute" (2016)	"Either Way" (2017)

"Parachute" is a song recorded by American singer-songwriter Chris Stapleton. It is the third single from his debut album Traveller. The song was written by Stapleton and Jim Beavers.

== Content ==
The song is an uptempo backed by banjo and acoustic guitar, in which the narrator sings about being there for the one he loves: "Baby, I will be your parachute".

== Critical reception ==
Billy Dukes of Taste of Country was favorable, praising the "more dynamic vocal performance" and "straight-forward arrangement", also saying that "Lyrically this isn't quite Song of the Year material, but Stapleton's vocals on 'Parachute' are his latest entry in a still-to-be-created Performance of the Year category".

== Live performance ==
Stapleton sang "Parachute" live at the CMT Music Awards in June 2016, with assistance from Dave Cobb, Mickey Raphael, Robby Turner, and Stapleton's wife, Morgane. He also performed the song on the January 16, 2016 edition of Saturday Night Live.

== Commercial performance ==
The song has sold 248,000 copies in the US as of December 2016.

== Charts ==
=== Weekly charts ===
Chart (2016–2017)	Peak position
Canada Country (Billboard)	34
US Billboard Hot 100	78
US Country Airplay (Billboard)	17
US Hot Country Songs (Billboard)	12

=== Year-end charts ===
Chart (2016)	Position
US Hot Country Songs (Billboard)	62
Chart (2017)	Position
US Hot Country Songs (Billboard)	86

== Certifications ==
Region	Certification	Certified units/sales
Australia (ARIA)	Platinum	70,000^{‡}
Canada (Music Canada)	3× Platinum	240,000^{‡}
New Zealand (RMNZ)	Platinum	30,000^{‡}
United Kingdom (BPI)	Silver	200,000^{‡}
United States (RIAA)	5× Platinum	5,000,000^{‡}
^{‡} Sales+streaming figures based on certification alone.
