= Rogers Stadium =

Temporary venue in Canada

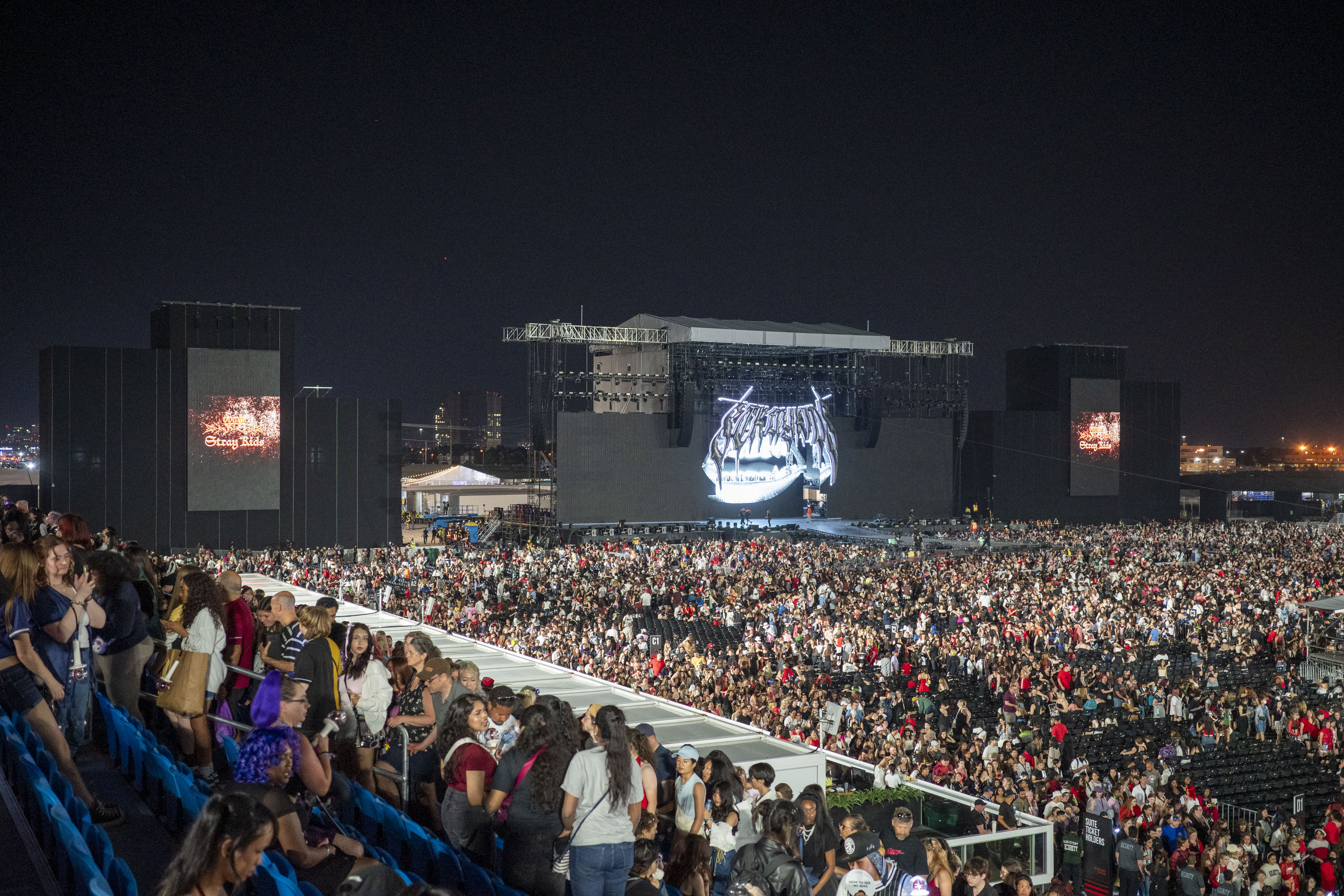
- Inaugural concert in June 2025

- Location in Toronto Rogers Stadium (Ontario) Rogers Stadium (Canada)
- Address: 105 Carl Hall Road; Toronto, Ontario, Canada
- Coordinates: 43°44′34″N 079°27′56″W
- Operator: Live Nation Entertainment
- Capacity: 50,000
- Public transit: at Downsview Park; at Sheppard West and Downsview Park

Construction
- Built: 2024–2025
- Opened: 29 June 2025
- Closed: Expected c. 2030

Website
- rogers-stadium.com

Rogers Stadium is a temporary music venue for concerts in the Downsview area of North York, a district of Toronto, Ontario, Canada. Announced by Live Nation Entertainment in September 2024, and completed in nine months, the stadium will be demolished after its intended lifetime of five years. It is the Greater Toronto Area's largest purpose-built music venue.

== History ==
On 26 September 2024, United States-based Live Nation Entertainment confirmed that Rogers Stadium would debut at the former Downsview Airport (YZD) in June 2025. The new stadium is an open-air concert venue with a stated capacity of 50,000, and according to Billboard Canada, it is "one of the world's few venues of the size that isn't also home to a sports team." Live Nation and Rogers Communications entered into a naming rights agreement that lasts for the entire duration of the venue's existence.

On 26 June 2025, Mayor Olivia Chow announced that Toronto Transit Commission (TTC) subway service from the stadium would be free after all shows, due to anticipated congestion issues and a lack of parking space at the venue. The first concert that Rogers Stadium hosted was Stray Kids on their Dominate World Tour on 29 June 2025.

In July 2025, during the Music of the Spheres World Tour by British rock band Coldplay, head vocalist Chris Martin referred to the venue as a "weird stadium in the middle of nowhere." Area residents complained about traffic and noise caused by the venue, with concertgoers also complaining about poor crowd control and a lack of safety.

In August 2025, Oasis performed at the Rogers Stadium during their reunion tour. It was the first time the band had performed in North America since 2008.

On 2 September 2026, the stadium was seriously damaged by a severe thunderstorm. There were no injuries reported. An AC/DC concert scheduled for 16 September 2026 was cancelled because of the damage.

== Site and design ==
Rogers Stadium was built on the former Downsview Airport lands (YZD), on a site described at announcement as approximately 44 acres at the north end of the former runway. It was designed as a seasonal, open-air concert stadium with a stated capacity of 50,000 and was constructed as a temporary facility intended to operate for roughly five years.

== Public transit and access ==
The venue’s pedestrian entrance is at 105 Carl Hall Road. It has Toronto Transit Commission subway access at Sheppard West and Downsview Park stations, with the former being the closest, and the latter also being a GO Transit station on the Barrie Line.

For the 2025 season, The TTC and GO Transit offered free post-event trips home for passengers with valid concert tickets.

== Concerts ==
List of concerts held at the Rogers Stadium
Date	Artist	Tour	Attendance	Revenue	Ref
2025
29 June	Stray Kids	Dominate World Tour	49,745 / 49,745	$7,107,706	
7, 8, 11 and 12 July	Coldplay	Music of the Spheres World Tour	207,412 / 207,412	$27,649,821	
22 and 23 July	Blackpink	Deadline World Tour	100,000	—	
24 and 25 August	Oasis	Oasis Live '25 Tour	100,000	—	
3 and 5 September	System of a Down & Deftones	—N/a	—	—	
10 September	Hozier	Unreal Unearth Tour	—	—	
2026
24, 27, 28, 30 and 31 May (Note: A concert was originally scheduled for 23 May, but due to bad weather, it was cancelled and rescheduled for 31 May.)	Bruno Mars	The Romantic Tour	—	—	
5 and 6 June	Luke Combs	My Kinda Saturday Night Tour	—	—	
13 June	Mumford & Sons	Prizefighter Tour			
16 June	Post Malone	Big Ass Stadium Tour	—	—	
28 June	Noah Kahan	The Great Divide Tour	53,506 / 53,506	—	
29 July	Karol G	Viajando Por El Mundo Tropitour			
4 August	Foo Fighters	Take Cover Tour	—	—	
5 August	Guns N' Roses	2026 Tour	—	—	
6 August	Chris Stapleton	All-American Road Show			
11 and 12 August	Usher & Chris Brown	The R&B Tour			
22 and 23 August	BTS	Arirang World Tour	—	—	
1 September	Chris Stapleton	All-American Road Show			
2027
25 June	Stray Kids	Run It World Tour			
23 July	Slipknot	(sic)est Stadium Tour			
4 and 7 August	Bon Jovi	Forever Tour			
