= Traveller (song) =

Single by Chris Stapleton

from the album Traveller
- Released: April 27, 2015
- Genre: Country folk
- Length: 3:42
- Label: Mercury Nashville
- Songwriter: Chris Stapleton
- Producers: Dave Cobb; Chris Stapleton

Chris Stapleton singles chronology
"What Are You Listening To?" (2013)	"Traveller" (2015)	"Nobody to Blame" (2015)

"Traveller" is a song written and recorded by American singer-songwriter Chris Stapleton. It was released to radio on April 27, 2015, as his debut solo single from his debut album of the same name. "Traveller" received nominations for Best Country Song and Best Country Solo Performance at the 58th Grammy Awards, winning the latter. The song has sold 135,000 copies in the United States as of February 2016.

== Charts ==
Chart (2015–2016)	Peak position
US Billboard Hot 100	87
US Hot Country Songs (Billboard)	17

== Certifications ==
Region	Certification	Certified units/sales
Australia (ARIA)	Gold	35,000^{‡}
Canada (Music Canada)	Platinum	80,000^{‡}
New Zealand (RMNZ)	Gold	15,000^{‡}
United States (RIAA)	4× Platinum	4,000,000^{‡}
^{‡} Sales+streaming figures based on certification alone.
