= Nobody to Blame =

2015 single by Chris Stapleton

Single by Chris Stapleton

from the album Traveller
- Released: November 9, 2015
- Genre: Country rock
- Length: 4:04
- Label: Mercury Nashville
- Songwriters: Chris Stapleton; Barry Bales; Ronnie Bowman
- Producers: Dave Cobb; Chris Stapleton

Chris Stapleton singles chronology
"Traveller" (2015)	"Nobody to Blame" (2015)	"Parachute" (2016)

"Nobody to Blame" is a song recorded by American singer-songwriter Chris Stapleton. The song was released in November 2015 as the singer's third single overall. Stapleton co-wrote the song with Barry Bales and Ronnie Bowman. It became Stapleton's first top 10 single on the US Country Airplay chart. "Nobody to Blame" won Song of the Year at the ACM Awards.

== Content ==
The country rock song is a mid-tempo composition about a man looking back on the events following a break-up. His ex has kicked him out of the house and destroyed all of his belongings, often in sadistic fashion (dumping out his whiskey, breaking his fishing rods, burning his guitar in a bonfire, running his hot rod car into a pond and putting sugar in the gas tank of his lawnmower). Despite her behavior, he admits there is "nobody to blame" but himself for his situation.

== Critical reception ==
Billy Dukes of Taste of Country gave the song a favorable review, saying that it "is a 200-proof country song that'd fit neatly into any generation's best of catalog. The second single from Traveller is full of steel guitar, fiddle and pain. It rambles along like the best from Waylon while providing a de facto education to the 21st century boy. Stapleton doesn't deviate from what he does best: simple, honest story songs that lean heavy on his once-in-a-lifetime voice".

== Commercial performance ==
The song first entered the Country Airplay chart at number 46 and the Hot Country Songs chart at number 50 for the chart dated November 21, 2015. The song peaked at number 10 on the Country Airplay chart, making it Stapleton's first single to reach the top 10. It has sold 423,000 copies in the US as of November 2016.

== Charts ==
=== Weekly charts ===
Chart (2015–2016)	Peak position
Canada Hot 100 (Billboard)	83
Canada Country (Billboard)	11
US Billboard Hot 100	68
US Country Airplay (Billboard)	10
US Hot Country Songs (Billboard)	13

=== Year end charts ===
Chart (2016)	Position
US Country Airplay (Billboard)	55
US Hot Country Songs (Billboard)	36

== Certifications ==
Region	Certification	Certified units/sales
Canada (Music Canada)	Platinum	80,000^{‡}
United States (RIAA)	2× Platinum	2,000,000^{‡}
^{‡} Sales+streaming figures based on certification alone.
