= Fire Away (song) =

2015 single by Chris Stapleton

Song by Chris Stapleton

from the album Traveller
- Studio: Grand Victor Sound (Nashville, Tennessee)
- Genre: Southern rock
- Length: 4:04
- Label: Mercury Nashville
- Songwriters: Chris Stapleton; Danny Green
- Producers: Dave Cobb; Chris Stapleton

Music video
- "Fire Away" on YouTube

"Fire Away" is a song recorded by American singer-songwriter Chris Stapleton for his studio album Traveller (2015). It was written by Stapleton and Danny Green. The song's accompanying music video was released on February 26, 2016.

== Composition ==
After listening to live renditions of "Fire Away", Billboard writer Elias Leight opined the song features "dragging beat in a classic soul-ballad time signature," while for Tad Dickens of The Roanoke Times, a "waltz-time."

== Music video ==
The music video concept for "Fire Away" was conceived by Stapleton and directed by Tim Mattia, starring Ben Foster and Margarita Levieva. The video follows a couple through courtship and marriage, going through exciting life moments such as buying a home and decorating it together. The happy memories soon fade, dissolving into struggle and ultimately tragedy, as it is evident that the woman is suffering from mental illness and tries multiple times to commit suicide. The video ends displaying the website for the Campaign to Change Direction. "Fire Away" visually depicts what the organization calls the Five Signs of suffering emotionally which includes change in personality, agitation, withdrawal, decline in personal care, and hopelessness. Stapleton makes a cameo as a bartender.

It won the award for Music Video of the Year at the 2016 Country Music Association Awards, and for Breakthrough Video of the Year at the 2016 CMT Music Awards. Reviewing the clip, Jon Freeman of Rolling Stone opined, "Though the video isn't a literal interpretation of Stapleton's lyrics, the video captures the song's weary sadness and brings the doomed resilience of his narrator to life in Foster's performance." Jim Casey of Nash Country Daily concluded saying, "Through a heartbreaking conclusion, it shows just how serious mental health issues can be."

== Charts ==
=== Weekly charts ===
Chart (2016)	Peak position
US Bubbling Under Hot 100 (Billboard)	6
US Hot Country Songs (Billboard)	25

=== Year-end charts ===
Chart (2016)	Position
US Hot Country Songs (Billboard)	88

== Certifications ==
Region	Certification	Certified units/sales
Canada (Music Canada)	2× Platinum	160,000^{‡}
New Zealand (RMNZ)	Platinum	30,000^{‡}
United Kingdom (BPI)	Silver	200,000^{‡}
United States (RIAA)	5× Platinum	5,000,000^{‡}
^{‡} Sales+streaming figures based on certification alone.
