= List of UK top-ten albums in 2025 =

The UK Albums Chart is one of many music charts compiled by the Official Charts Company that calculates the best-selling albums of the week in the United Kingdom. Since 2004 the chart has been based on the sales of both physical albums and digital downloads. Since 2015, the album chart has been based on both sales and streaming. This list shows albums that peaked in the top ten of the UK Albums Chart during 2025, as well as albums which peaked in 2024 and 2026 but were in the top 10 in 2025. The entry date is when the album appeared in the top 10 for the first time (week ending, as published by the Official Charts Company, which is six days after the chart is announced).

One-hundred and fifty-nine albums were in the top 10 this year. One album from 2021, one album from 2023 and nine albums from 2024 remained in the top ten for several weeks at the beginning of the year, while Rebel by EsDeeKid, Rumours by Fleetwood Mac, originally released in 1977, were both released in 2025, but did not reach their peak until 2026. Christmas by Michael Bublé, originally released in 2011, and +–=÷× (Tour Collection) by Ed Sheeran were the albums from 2024 to reach their peak in 2025.

The first new number-one album of the year was Christmas by Michael Bublé. Overall, thirty-nine albums peaked at number-one in 2025, with Elton John, Ed Sheeran, Pink Floyd and Taylor Swift (all 2) having the joint most albums hit that position.

An asterisk (*) in the "Weeks in Top 10" column shows that the album is currently in the top 10.

== Top-ten albums ==
Key

| Symbol | Meaning |
|---|---|
| ‡ | Album peaked in 2021 or 2024 but still in chart in 2025. |
| ♦ | Album released in 2025 but peaked in 2026. |
| (#) | Year-end top ten album position and rank |
| Entered | The date that the album first appeared in the chart. |
| Peak | Highest position that the song reached in the UK Albums Chart. |

| Entered (week ending) | Weeks in top 10 | Album | Artist | Peak | Peak reached (week ending) | Weeks at peak |
Albums in 2021
| 18 February 2021 | 212* | The Highlights ‡ | The Weeknd | 2 | 18 February 2021 | 7 |
Albums in 2023
| 23 November 2023 | 32 | Stick Season ‡ | Noah Kahan | 1 | 22 February 2024 | 1 |
Albums in 2024
| 21 March 2024 | 8 | Eternal Sunshine ‡ | Ariana Grande | 1 | 21 March 2024 | 2 |
| 2 May 2024 | 31 | The Tortured Poets Department ‡ | Taylor Swift | 1 | 2 May 2024 | 11 |
| 30 May 2024 | 32 | Hit Me Hard and Soft ‡ | Billie Eilish | 1 | 30 May 2024 | 1 |
| 20 June 2024 | 35 | Brat ‡ | Charli XCX | 1 | 24 October 2024 | 1 |
| 27 June 2024 | 43 | The Rise and Fall of a Midwest Princess ‡ | Chappell Roan | 1 | 15 August 2024 | 2 |
| 4 July 2024 | 6 | The Secret of Us ‡ | Gracie Abrams | 1 | 4 July 2024 | 1 |
| 5 September 2024 | 53 | Short n' Sweet ‡ | Sabrina Carpenter | 1 | 5 September 2024 | 5 |
| 10 October 2024 | 72 | +–=÷× (Tour Collection) | Ed Sheeran | 1 | 9 January 2025 | 2 |
| 5 December 2024 | 7 | GNX ‡ | Kendrick Lamar | 1 | 5 December 2024 | 1 |
| 12 December 2024 | 8 | Christmas | Michael Bublé | 1 | 2 January 2025 | 2 |
Albums in 2025
| 2 January 2025 | 11 | SOS | SZA | 3 | 2 January 2025 | 3 |
| 2 January 2025 | 9 | Diamonds | Elton John | 1 | 16 January 2025 | 1 |
| 9 January 2025 | 44 | 50 Years – Don't Stop | Fleetwood Mac | 4 | 1 May 2025 | 3 |
| 23 January 2025 | 1 | The Human Fear | Franz Ferdinand | 3 | 23 January 2025 | 1 |
| 30 January 2025 | 1 | Better Man: Original Soundtrack | Robbie Williams | 1 | 30 January 2025 | 1 |
| 6 February 2025 | 5 | Can't Rush Greatness | Central Cee | 1 | 6 February 2025 | 1 |
| 6 February 2025 | 1 | I've Tried Everything but Therapy (Part 2) | Teddy Swims | 2 | 6 February 2025 | 1 |
| 6 February 2025 | 1 | Eusexua | FKA Twigs | 3 | 6 February 2025 | 1 |
| 6 February 2025 | 1 | The Bad Fire | Mogwai | 5 | 6 February 2025 | 1 |
| 13 February 2025 | 2 | Hurry Up Tomorrow | The Weeknd | 1 | 13 February 2025 | 1 |
| 13 February 2025 | 1 | Hallucinating Love | Maribou State | 9 | 13 February 2025 | 1 |
| 13 February 2025 | 1 | Restoration | RØRY | 10 | 13 February 2025 | 1 |
| 20 February 2025 | 1 | Lover (Live from Paris) | Taylor Swift | 1 | 20 February 2025 | 1 |
| 20 February 2025 | 1 | Open Wide | Inhaler | 2 | 20 February 2025 | 1 |
| 27 February 2025 | 1 | Critical Thinking | Manic Street Preachers | 2 | 27 February 2025 | 1 |
| 27 February 2025 | 2 | Some Sexy Songs 4 U | PartyNextDoor and Drake | 3 | 27 February 2025 | 1 |
| 27 February 2025 | 1 | Oh! The Ocean | The Wombats | 4 | 27 February 2025 | 1 |
| 27 February 2025 | 1 | Be Lucky | Louis Dunford | 8 | 27 February 2025 | 1 |
| 6 March 2025 | 8 | People Watching | Sam Fender | 1 | 6 March 2025 | 1 |
| 6 March 2025 | 17 | So Close to What | Tate McRae | 2 | 6 March 2025 | 1 |
| 13 March 2025 | 1 | The Sky, the Earth & All Between | Architects | 2 | 13 March 2025 | 1 |
| 13 March 2025 | 1 | Matter Does Not Define | The Lathums | 3 | 13 March 2025 | 1 |
| 13 March 2025 | 1 | Constellations for the Lonely | Doves | 5 | 13 March 2025 | 1 |
| 13 March 2025 | 1 | The Panic Years | Bradley Simpson | 7 | 13 March 2025 | 1 |
| 20 March 2025 | 7 | Mayhem | Lady Gaga | 1 | 20 March 2025 | 1 |
| 20 March 2025 | 1 | Ruby | Jennie | 3 | 20 March 2025 | 1 |
| 27 March 2025 | 2 | Music | Playboi Carti | 1 | 27 March 2025 | 1 |
| 27 March 2025 | 1 | The Overview | Steven Wilson | 3 | 27 March 2025 | 1 |
| 3 April 2025 | 1 | KOKO | The Lottery Winners | 1 | 3 April 2025 | 1 |
| 3 April 2025 | 1 | The Great Western Road | Deacon Blue | 3 | 3 April 2025 | 1 |
| 3 April 2025 | 1 | I Said I Love You First | Selena Gomez and Benny Blanco | 4 | 3 April 2025 | 1 |
| 10 April 2025 | 1 | Rushmere | Mumford & Sons | 1 | 10 April 2025 | 1 |
| 10 April 2025 | 1 | Dreams on Toast | The Darkness | 2 | 10 April 2025 | 1 |
| 10 April 2025 | 1 | Forever Is a Feeling | Lucy Dacus | 5 | 10 April 2025 | 1 |
| 10 April 2025 | 1 | Rent's Due | Nemzzz | 6 | 10 April 2025 | 1 |
| 10 April 2025 | 27 | You'll Be Alright, Kid (Chapter 1) | Alex Warren | 1 | 31 July 2025 | 1 |
| 17 April 2025 | 3 | Who Believes in Angels? | Elton John and Brandi Carlile | 1 | 17 April 2025 | 1 |
| 17 April 2025 | 1 | Forever Howlong | Black Country New Road | 3 | 17 April 2025 | 1 |
| 17 April 2025 | 1 | Preacher's Daughter | Ethel Cain | 10 | 17 April 2025 | 1 |
| 24 April 2025 | 1 | God Shaped Hole | Those Damn Crows | 1 | 24 April 2025 | 1 |
| 24 April 2025 | 21 | Time Flies... 1994–2009 | Oasis | 1 | 17 July 2025 | 2 |
| 24 April 2025 | 1 | Sable, Fable | Bon Iver | 4 | 24 April 2025 | 1 |
| 1 May 2025 | 1 | 5ive | Davido | 7 | 1 May 2025 | 1 |
| 8 May 2025 | 1 | Make 'Em Laugh, Make 'Em Cry, Make 'Em Wait | Stereophonics | 1 | 8 May 2025 | 1 |
| 8 May 2025 | 1 | Skeletá | Ghost | 2 | 8 May 2025 | 1 |
| 8 May 2025 | 1 | Pisces | James Arthur | 3 | 8 May 2025 | 1 |
| 8 May 2025 | 1 | A Complicated Woman | Self Esteem | 5 | 8 May 2025 | 1 |
| 8 May 2025 | 1 | Still Blooming | Jeff Goldblum & the Mildred Snitzer Orchestra | 10 | 8 May 2025 | 1 |
| 15 May 2025 | 1 | Pink Floyd at Pompeii – MCMLXXII | Pink Floyd | 1 | 15 May 2025 | 1 |
| 22 May 2025 | 2 | Even in Arcadia | Sleep Token | 1 | 22 May 2025 | 1 |
| 22 May 2025 | 2 | Fancy That | PinkPantheress | 3 | 22 May 2025 | 1 |
| 22 May 2025 | 1 | Never/Know | The Kooks | 5 | 22 May 2025 | 1 |
| 29 May 2025 | 3 | I'm the Problem | Morgan Wallen | 1 | 29 May 2025 | 1 |
| 29 May 2025 | 1 | Everything Must Make Sense | The Sherlocks | 4 | 29 May 2025 | 1 |
| 29 May 2025 | 1 | Felt Better Alive | Pete Doherty | 7 | 29 May 2025 | 1 |
| 29 May 2025 | 1 | Brothers in Arms | Dire Straits | 8 | 29 May 2025 | 1 |
| 5 June 2025 | 1 | Mad! | Sparks | 2 | 5 June 2025 | 1 |
| 5 June 2025 | 1 | Addicted to You | When Rivers Meet | 4 | 5 June 2025 | 1 |
| 5 June 2025 | 1 | The Painful Truth | Skunk Anansie | 7 | 5 June 2025 | 1 |
| 5 June 2025 | 1 | Confessions | Louise | 8 | 5 June 2025 | 1 |
| 12 June 2025 | 1 | Something Beautiful | Miley Cyrus | 3 | 12 June 2025 | 1 |
| 12 June 2025 | 1 | Reputation | Taylor Swift | 7 | 12 June 2025 | 1 |
| 12 June 2025 | 1 | ABBA Gold | ABBA | 9 | 12 June 2025 | 1 |
| 19 June 2025 | 2 | More | Pulp | 1 | 19 June 2025 | 1 |
| 19 June 2025 | 1 | Addison | Addison Rae | 2 | 19 June 2025 | 1 |
| 19 June 2025 | 1 | Lotus | Little Simz | 3 | 19 June 2025 | 1 |
| 19 June 2025 | 1 | Princess of Power | Marina | 7 | 19 June 2025 | 1 |
| 19 June 2025 | 1 | Three Cheers for Sweet Revenge | My Chemical Romance | 9 | 19 June 2025 | 1 |
| 26 June 2025 | 1 | Don't Tell the Dog | James Marriott | 1 | 26 June 2025 | 1 |
| 26 June 2025 | 1 | Mixes of a Lost World | The Cure | 9 | 26 June 2025 | 1 |
| 3 July 2025 | 1 | Idols | Yungblud | 1 | 3 July 2025 | 1 |
| 3 July 2025 | 1 | Hopefully! | Loyle Carner | 2 | 3 July 2025 | 1 |
| 3 July 2025 | 1 | I Quit | Haim | 3 | 3 July 2025 | 1 |
| 3 July 2025 | 1 | American Heart | Benson Boone | 4 | 3 July 2025 | 1 |
| 3 July 2025 | 1 | 4 | Aitch | 7 | 3 July 2025 | 1 |
| 10 July 2025 | 2 | Virgin | Lorde | 1 | 10 July 2025 | 1 |
| 10 July 2025 | 1 | Tracks II: The Lost Albums | Bruce Springsteen | 2 | 10 July 2025 | 1 |
| 10 July 2025 | 1 | Ultimate Hits | Rod Stewart | 5 | 10 July 2025 | 1 |
| 10 July 2025 | 1 | Guts | Olivia Rodrigo | 8 | 10 July 2025 | 1 |
| 17 July 2025 | 14 | (What's the Story) Morning Glory? | Oasis | 2 | 17 July 2025 | 2 |
| 17 July 2025 | 7 | Definitely Maybe | Oasis | 4 | 17 July 2025 | 1 |
| 24 July 2025 | 1 | Moisturizer | Wet Leg | 1 | 24 July 2025 | 1 |
| 24 July 2025 | 3 | Swag | Justin Bieber | 4 | 24 July 2025 | 1 |
| 24 July 2025 | 1 | No Sign of Weakness | Burna Boy | 6 | 24 July 2025 | 1 |
| 24 July 2025 | 1 | Is This What You've Been Waiting For? | Amy Macdonald | 8 | 24 July 2025 | 1 |
| 24 July 2025 | 1 | Loner | Barry Can't Swim | 10 | 24 July 2025 | 1 |
| 31 July 2025 | 1 | Don't Tap the Glass | Tyler, the Creator | 2 | 31 July 2025 | 1 |
| 7 August 2025 | 1 | Pretty on the Internet | The K's | 1 | 7 August 2025 | 1 |
| 7 August 2025 | 1 | Find El Dorado | Paul Weller | 5 | 7 August 2025 | 1 |
| 7 August 2025 | 1 | The Revenge of Alice Cooper | Alice Cooper | 9 | 7 August 2025 | 1 |
| 14 August 2025 | 1 | Bite Me | Reneé Rapp | 1 | 14 August 2025 | 1 |
| 14 August 2025 | 3 | The Essential Michael Jackson | Michael Jackson | 8 | 20 November 2025 | 1 |
| 21 August 2025 | 1 | Lost Americana | MGK | 2 | 21 August 2025 | 1 |
| 21 August 2025 | 1 | Songs for the Spine | The Royston Club | 4 | 21 August 2025 | 1 |
| 21 August 2025 | 1 | The Last Wun | Gunna | 9 | 21 August 2025 | 1 |
| 21 August 2025 | 1 | Commitment | Craig David | 10 | 21 August 2025 | 1 |
| 28 August 2025 | 1 | Everywhere I Went, Led Me to Where I Didn't Want to Be | Tom Grennan | 1 | 28 August 2025 | 1 |
| 28 August 2025 | 1 | Wishbone | Conan Gray | 2 | 28 August 2025 | 1 |
| 4 September 2025 | 1 | The Clearing | Wolf Alice | 1 | 4 September 2025 | 1 |
| 4 September 2025 | 1 | Private Music | Deftones | 2 | 4 September 2025 | 1 |
| 4 September 2025 | 1 | A Matter of Time | Laufey | 3 | 4 September 2025 | 1 |
| 4 September 2025 | 1 | Halcyon | Kingfishr | 7 | 4 September 2025 | 1 |
| 4 September 2025 | 1 | Inertia | Pendulum | 8 | 4 September 2025 | 1 |
| 4 September 2025 | 1 | I Barely Know Her | Sombr | 10 | 4 September 2025 | 1 |
| 11 September 2025 | 28 | Man's Best Friend | Sabrina Carpenter | 1 | 11 September 2025 | 2 |
| 11 September 2025 | 1 | Euro-Country | CMAT | 2 | 11 September 2025 | 1 |
| 11 September 2025 | 1 | Roll with the Punches | Bryan Adams | 3 | 11 September 2025 | 1 |
| 11 September 2025 | 1 | The Hives Forever Forever the Hives | The Hives | 5 | 11 September 2025 | 1 |
| 18 September 2025 | 1 | Antidepressants | Suede | 2 | 18 September 2025 | 1 |
| 18 September 2025 | 1 | Buck | Red Rum Club | 7 | 18 September 2025 | 1 |
| 18 September 2025 | 1 | International | Saint Etienne | 8 | 18 September 2025 | 1 |
| 25 September 2025 | 3 | Play | Ed Sheeran | 1 | 25 September 2025 | 1 |
| 25 September 2025 | 1 | That's Showbiz Baby | Jade | 3 | 25 September 2025 | 1 |
| 25 September 2025 | 1 | Breach | Twenty One Pilots | 4 | 25 September 2025 | 1 |
| 25 September 2025 | 1 | Perimenopop | Sophie Ellis-Bextor | 5 | 25 September 2025 | 1 |
| 2 October 2025 | 1 | Futique | Biffy Clyro | 1 | 2 October 2025 | 1 |
| 2 October 2025 | 1 | I'm Only F**king Myself | Lola Young | 3 | 2 October 2025 | 1 |
| 2 October 2025 | 1 | Rainy Sunday Afternoon | The Divine Comedy | 4 | 2 October 2025 | 1 |
| 2 October 2025 | 1 | Buckingham Nicks | Lindsey Buckingham & Stevie Nicks | 6 | 2 October 2025 | 1 |
| 9 October 2025 | 60* | The Art of Loving | Olivia Dean | 1 | 9 October 2025 | 8 |
| 9 October 2025 | 1 | Perrie | Perrie | 3 | 9 October 2025 | 1 |
| 9 October 2025 | 1 | Saving Grace | Robert Plant | 4 | 9 October 2025 | 1 |
| 9 October 2025 | 1 | Vie | Doja Cat | 5 | 9 October 2025 | 1 |
| 16 October 2025 | 18 | The Life of a Showgirl | Taylor Swift | 1 | 16 October 2025 | 5 |
| 16 October 2025 | 1 | Fight Another Day | James Morrison | 5 | 16 October 2025 | 1 |
| 23 October 2025 | 1 | Lovin' You | Richard Ashcroft | 3 | 23 October 2025 | 1 |
| 30 October 2025 | 1 | From the Pyre | The Last Dinner Party | 2 | 30 October 2025 | 1 |
| 30 October 2025 | 1 | Deadbeat | Tame Impala | 4 | 30 October 2025 | 1 |
| 6 November 2025 | 2 | The Boy Who Played the Harp | Dave | 1 | 6 November 2025 | 1 |
| 6 November 2025 | 1 | Forever (Legendary Edition) | Bon Jovi | 2 | 6 November 2025 | 1 |
| 6 November 2025 | 5 | West End Girl | Lily Allen | 2 | 13 November 2025 | 2 |
| 13 November 2025 | 1 | Everybody Scream | Florence and the Machine | 1 | 13 November 2025 | 1 |
| 13 November 2025 | 1 | How to Be Human | Cat Burns | 5 | 13 November 2025 | 1 |
| 13 November 2025 | 1 | We Are Love | The Charlatans | 8 | 13 November 2025 | 1 |
| 20 November 2025 | 1 | Lux | Rosalía | 4 | 20 November 2025 | 1 |
| 20 November 2025 | 1 | Ego Death at a Bachelorette Party | Hayley Williams | 10 | 20 November 2025 | 1 |
| 27 November 2025 | 1 | Everyone's a Star! | 5 Seconds of Summer | 1 | 27 November 2025 | 1 |
| 27 November 2025 | 1 | PTSD 2 | D-Block Europe | 4 | 27 November 2025 | 1 |
| 4 December 2025 | 1 | One More Time (EP) | Aerosmith & Yungblud | 1 | 4 December 2025 | 1 |
| 4 December 2025 | 1 | Knees Up | Olly Murs | 5 | 4 December 2025 | 1 |
| 4 December 2025 | 1 | Nothing but Love: The Definitive Best Of | James | 6 | 4 December 2025 | 1 |
| 4 December 2025 | 1 | Hit Parade | Madness | 8 | 4 December 2025 | 1 |
| 4 December 2025 | 1 | Anthology 4 | The Beatles | 9 | 4 December 2025 | 1 |
| 4 December 2025 | 1 | Contact | Sub Focus | 10 | 4 December 2025 | 1 |
| 11 December 2025 | 2 | Rebel ♦ | EsDeeKid | 8 | 1 January 2026 | 1 |
| 18 December 2025 | 1 | Kylie Christmas (Fully Wrapped) | Kylie Minogue | 1 | 18 December 2025 | 1 |
| 18 December 2025 | 3 | Rumours ♦ | Fleetwood Mac | 5 | 1 January 2026 | 1 |
| 25 December 2025 | 1 | Wish You Were Here | Pink Floyd | 1 | 25 December 2025 | 1 |

== Entries by artist ==
The following table shows artists who have achieved two or more top 10 entries in 2025, including albums that reached their peak in 2024. The figures only include main artists, with featured artists and appearances on compilation albums not counted individually for each artist. The total number of weeks an artist spent in the top ten in 2025 is also shown.

| Entries | Artist | Weeks | Albums |
|---|---|---|---|
| 4 | Taylor Swift | 16 | The Tortured Poets Department, Lover (Live from Paris), Reputation, The Life of a Showgirl |
| 3 | Lindsey Buckingham | 45 | 50 Years – Don't Stop, Buckingham Nicks, Rumours |
| 3 | Stevie Nicks | 45 | 50 Years – Don't Stop, Buckingham Nicks, Rumours |
| 3 | Oasis | 22 | Time Flies... 1994–2009, (What's the Story) Morning Glory?, Definitely Maybe |
| 2 | Ed Sheeran | 47 | +–=÷× (Tour Collection), Play |
| 2 | Elton John | 11 | Diamonds, Who Believes in Angels? |
| 2 | Pink Floyd | 2 | Pink Floyd at Pompeii – MCMLXXII, Wish You Were Here |
| 2 | Sabrina Carpenter | 48 | Short n' Sweet, Man's Best Friend |
| 2 | Yungblud | 2 | Idols, One More Time (EP) |

== See also ==
- List of UK Albums Chart number ones of the 2020s

== Sources ==
- "Six decades of singles charts". The Official Charts Company. Archived from the original on 3 March 2011.
