= List of UK top-ten albums in 2026 =

The UK Albums Chart is one of many music charts compiled by the Official Charts Company that calculates the best-selling albums of the week in the United Kingdom. Since 2004 the chart has been based on the sales of both physical albums and digital downloads. Since 2015, the album chart has been based on both sales and streaming. This list shows albums that peaked in the top ten of the UK Albums Chart during 2026, as well as albums which peaked in 2025 but were in the top 10 in 2026. The entry date is when the album appeared in the top 10 for the first time (week ending, as published by the Official Charts Company, which is six days after the chart is announced).

One-hundred and fifty-six albums have been in the top 10 so far this year (as of 19 November 2026, week ending). One album from 2021, two albums from 2024 and twelve albums from 2025 remained in the top ten for several weeks at the beginning of the year. Rebel by EsDeeKid, Rumours by Fleetwood Mac, originally released in 1977, and Christmas by Michael Bublé, originally released in 2011, were the albums from 2025 to reach their peak in 2026.

The first new number-one album of the year was Christmas by Michael Bublé. Overall, thirty-seven albums have peaked at number-one so far in 2026, with Charli XCX (2) having the most albums hit that position.

An asterisk (*) in the "Weeks in Top 10" column shows that the album is currently in the top 10.

== Top-ten albums ==
Key

Symbol	Meaning
‡	Album peaked in 2021, 2024 or 2025 but still in chart in 2026.
♦	Album released in 2026 but peaked in 2027.
(#)	Year-end top ten album position and rank
Entered	The date that the album first appeared in the chart.
Peak	Highest position that the song reached in the UK Albums Chart.

Entered (week ending)	Weeks in top 10	Album	Artist	Peak	Peak reached (week ending)	Weeks at peak
Albums in 2021
18 February 2021	212*	The Highlights ‡	The Weeknd	2	18 February 2021	7
Albums in 2024
5 September 2024	53	Short n' Sweet ‡	Sabrina Carpenter	1	5 September 2024	5
10 October 2024	72	+–=÷× (Tour Collection) ‡	Ed Sheeran	1	9 January 2025	2
Albums in 2025
6 March 2025	8	People Watching ‡	Sam Fender	1	6 March 2025	1
6 March 2025	17	So Close to What ‡	Tate McRae	2	6 March 2025	1
10 April 2025	27	You'll Be Alright, Kid (Chapter 1)	Alex Warren	1	31 July 2025	1
22 May 2025	2	Fancy That ‡	PinkPantheress	3	22 May 2025	1
17 July 2025	14	(What's the Story) Morning Glory? ‡	Oasis	2	17 July 2025	2
11 September 2025	28	Man's Best Friend ‡	Sabrina Carpenter	1	11 September 2025	2
9 October 2025	60*	The Art of Loving ‡	Olivia Dean	1	9 October 2025	8
16 October 2025	18	The Life of a Showgirl ‡	Taylor Swift	1	16 October 2025	5
6 November 2025	5	West End Girl ‡	Lily Allen	2	13 November 2025	2
11 December 2025	4	Christmas	Michael Bublé	1	1 January 2026	1
11 December 2025	2	Rebel	EsDeeKid	8	1 January 2026	1
18 December 2025	3	Rumours	Fleetwood Mac	5	1 January 2026	1
Albums in 2026
1 January 2026	43	50 Years – Don't Stop	Fleetwood Mac	3	15 January 2026	2
8 January 2026	1	Diamonds	Elton John	7	8 January 2026	1
8 January 2026	41*	The Essential Michael Jackson	Michael Jackson	1	14 May 2026	2
22 January 2026	1	Reflections	Blue	2	22 January 2026	1
22 January 2026	2	With Heaven on Top	Zach Bryan	3	22 January 2026	1
22 January 2026	1	Selling a Vibe	The Cribs	5	22 January 2026	1
29 January 2026	1	Britpop	Robbie Williams	1	29 January 2026	1
29 January 2026	1	Locket	Madison Beer	3	29 January 2026	1
29 January 2026	1	Angels' Share	Nathan Evans and Saint Phnx	4	29 January 2026	1
29 January 2026	1	The Demise of Planet X	Sleaford Mods	6	29 January 2026	1
29 January 2026	1	Don't Be Dumb	ASAP Rocky	8	29 January 2026	1
5 February 2026	1	How Did I Get Here?	Louis Tomlinson	1	5 February 2026	1
5 February 2026	1	Megadeth	Megadeth	3	5 February 2026	1
5 February 2026	1	Indi	Callum Beattie	4	5 February 2026	1
12 February 2026	1	Wasted on Youth	The Molotovs	3	12 February 2026	1
12 February 2026	1	Octane	Don Toliver	4	12 February 2026	1
12 February 2026	2	Number Ones	Michael Jackson	5	7 May 2026	1
12 February 2026	1	Yeah Yeah Yeah	Cast	8	12 February 2026	1
12 February 2026	1	And I'd Do It Again	Only the Poets	9	12 February 2026	1
19 February 2026	2	Debí Tirar Más Fotos	Bad Bunny	2	19 February 2026	1
19 February 2026	1	The Fall-Off	J. Cole	3	19 February 2026	1
19 February 2026	1	Piss in the Wind	Joji	6	19 February 2026	1
26 February 2026	2	Wuthering Heights	Charli XCX	1	26 February 2026	1
5 March 2026	1	Prizefighter	Mumford & Sons	1	5 March 2026	1
5 March 2026	1	My Ego Told Me To	Leigh-Anne	3	5 March 2026	1
5 March 2026	1	Faith	George Michael	4	5 March 2026	1
5 March 2026	1	Luck... or Something	Hilary Duff	5	5 March 2026	1
12 March 2026	2	The Mountain	Gorillaz	1	12 March 2026	1
12 March 2026	2	The Romantic	Bruno Mars	3	12 March 2026	1
12 March 2026	1	Nothing's About to Happen to Me	Mitski	4	12 March 2026	1
19 March 2026	14	Kiss All the Time. Disco, Occasionally	Harry Styles	1	19 March 2026	2
19 March 2026	1	Make-Up Is a Lie	Morrissey	3	19 March 2026	1
26 March 2026	1	Trying Times	James Blake	3	26 March 2026	1
26 March 2026	1	Stick Season	Noah Kahan	10	26 March 2026	1
2 April 2026	4	Arirang	BTS	1	2 April 2026	1
2 April 2026	1	The Way I Am	Luke Combs	4	2 April 2026	1
2 April 2026	1	Living the Dream	Jane McDonald	10	2 April 2026	1
9 April 2026	4	This Music May Contain Hope	Raye	1	9 April 2026	1
9 April 2026	1	Bully	Kanye West	3	9 April 2026	1
9 April 2026	1	Hades	Melanie Martinez	5	9 April 2026	1
9 April 2026	1	Nightmare Tripping	Don Broco	7	9 April 2026	1
9 April 2026	1	Full Circle	Tom Misch	9	9 April 2026	1
9 April 2026	1	Sexistential	Robyn	10	9 April 2026	1
16 April 2026	1	The Weight of the Woods	Dermot Kennedy	1	16 April 2026	1
23 April 2026	1	We Will Always Be the Way We Were	Jack Savoretti	2	23 April 2026	1
23 April 2026	1	Cruel World	Holly Humberstone	4	23 April 2026	1
23 April 2026	1	Dandelion	Ella Langley	7	23 April 2026	1
30 April 2026	1	You Got This	Skindred	1	30 April 2026	1
30 April 2026	1	Superbloom	Jessie Ware	2	30 April 2026	1
30 April 2026	1	Konnakol	Zayn	4	30 April 2026	1
7 May 2026	15*	The Great Divide	Noah Kahan	1	7 May 2026	1
7 May 2026	1	Your Favorite Toy	Foo Fighters	2	7 May 2026	1
7 May 2026	1	Michael: Songs from the Motion Picture	Michael Jackson	4	7 May 2026	1
7 May 2026	12	Thriller	Michael Jackson	4	28 May 2026	1
14 May 2026	1	Fenian	Kneecap	2	14 May 2026	1
14 May 2026	1	Sweat	Melanie C	3	14 May 2026	1
14 May 2026	1	Middle of Nowhere	Kacey Musgraves	7	14 May 2026	1
14 May 2026	5	Bad	Michael Jackson	6	21 May 2026	1
21 May 2026	1	25: The Ultimate Collection	Westlife	2	21 May 2026	1
21 May 2026	1	Is This How Happiness Feels?	Reverend and the Makers	7	21 May 2026	1
28 May 2026	6	Iceman	Drake	1	28 May 2026	1
28 May 2026	1	Maid of Honour	Drake	6	28 May 2026	1
28 May 2026	1	Habibti	Drake	7	28 May 2026	1
4 June 2026	1	Florescence	Maisie Peters	1	4 June 2026	1
4 June 2026	1	Glow	Michael Ball	9	4 June 2026	1
11 June 2026	1	The Boys of Dungeon Lane	Paul McCartney	1	11 June 2026	1
11 June 2026	1	Inferno	Boards of Canada	3	11 June 2026	1
11 June 2026	1	Eight	Shinedown	8	11 June 2026	1
18 June 2026	1	Dinner Party	Niall Horan	1	18 June 2026	1
18 June 2026	1	Elsewhere Always	Overpass	5	18 June 2026	1
18 June 2026	1	Night Blooms	Jeff Goldblum & the Mildred Snitzer Orchestra	9	18 June 2026	1
18 June 2026	1	Sanctuary	Evanescence	10	18 June 2026	1
25 June 2026	22*	You Seem Pretty Sad for a Girl So in Love	Olivia Rodrigo	1	25 June 2026	2
25 June 2026	1	Avalanche	Embrace	5	25 June 2026	1
2 July 2026	1	My Mess, My Heart, My Life	Myles Smith	2	2 July 2026	1
9 July 2026	1	The Wow! Signal	Muse	1	9 July 2026	1
9 July 2026	1	Dear God	The Pretty Reckless	6	9 July 2026	1
9 July 2026	5	The Ones That Got the Plays	Katy Perry	8	13 August 2026	1
16 July 2026	2	Confessions II	Madonna	1	16 July 2026	1
16 July 2026	20*	Visitor	Sienna Spiro	2	16 July 2026	1
23 July 2026	2	Foreign Tongues	The Rolling Stones	1	23 July 2026	1
23 July 2026	1	Danger Days: The True Lives of the Fabulous Killjoys	My Chemical Romance	2	23 July 2026	1
23 July 2026	1	On Your Side	December 10	5	23 July 2026	1
23 July 2026	1	Count Your Blessings: Repented	Bring Me the Horizon	6	23 July 2026	1
30 July 2026	1	Daughter from Hell	Gracie Abrams	1	30 July 2026	1
6 August 2026	1	Music, Fashion, Film	Charli XCX	1	6 August 2026	1
6 August 2026	1	Eyes Open	Snow Patrol	4	6 August 2026	1
6 August 2026	1	Little Miss Twain	Shania Twain	7	6 August 2026	1
6 August 2026	1	Reality Awaits	The Strokes	8	6 August 2026	1
13 August 2026	3	Petal	Ariana Grande	1	13 August 2026	1
20 August 2026	1	A Love Letter to a Broken Town	The Reytons	1	20 August 2026	1
20 August 2026	1	Therapy at the Club	Flo	5	20 August 2026	1
20 August 2026	1	Chuck Timely & the Hourglass	Role Model	6	20 August 2026	1
27 August 2026	1	Lost Weekend	Phoebe Bridgers	1	27 August 2026	1
27 August 2026	1	Wild (EP)	Katseye	2	27 August 2026	1
27 August 2026	1	The User's Guide to Being Human	The Script	3	27 August 2026	1
27 August 2026	1	Sunshine	Jungle	4	27 August 2026	1
3 September 2026	1	Jenius	Paul Heaton	1	3 September 2026	1
3 September 2026	1	Thrasher	Brandon Flowers	3	3 September 2026	1
3 September 2026	1	It Goes On	Westside Cowboy	5	3 September 2026	1
3 September 2026	2	Diamonds & Rhinestones: The Greatest Hits Collection	Dolly Parton	5	10 September 2026	1
3 September 2026	1	DMA's	DMA's	9	3 September 2026	1
10 September 2026	1	Wildchild	Alex Warren	1	10 September 2026	1
10 September 2026	1	God Bless the Band	Courteeners	2	10 September 2026	1
10 September 2026	1	True Confessions	Bananarama	6	10 September 2026	1
17 September 2026	1	Act III	Kasabian	1	17 September 2026	1
17 September 2026	1	Prima	Adéla	2	17 September 2026	1
17 September 2026	1	Blood of Your Empire	President	5	17 September 2026	1
17 September 2026	1	Running Round the Sun	Jamie Webster	10	17 September 2026	1
24 September 2026	1	Here Because of Hope	Ezra Collective	1	24 September 2026	1
24 September 2026	6	Time Flies... 1994–2009	Oasis	5	24 September 2026	1
24 September 2026	1	Anatomy of a Brief Romance	Bloc Party	6	24 September 2026	1
24 September 2026	1	Bloodletting	RØRY	8	24 September 2026	1
1 October 2026	1	Pylon	Beabadoobee	1	1 October 2026	1
1 October 2026	1	Violence Insane in a Beautiful World	Roger Taylor	6	1 October 2026	1
8 October 2026	1	Put a Smile on for Me	Keo	2	8 October 2026	1
8 October 2026	1	Stray Dogs	Nothing but Thieves	3	8 October 2026	1
15 October 2026	1	Songs from the Wedding Cake	Blossoms	1	15 October 2026	1
15 October 2026	1	Rubber Soul	The Beatles	2	15 October 2026	1
15 October 2026	1	The Age of Everything	Johnny Marr	5	15 October 2026	1
22 October 2026	1	Ghosts (100 Days of Morning)	Jamie T	1	22 October 2026	1
22 October 2026	1	Generic Everything	Chase & Status	2	22 October 2026	1
22 October 2026	1	She's the Best	Troye Sivan	9	22 October 2026	1
29 October 2026	4*	Dopamine Chamber	Fontaines D.C.	1	29 October 2026	1
29 October 2026	1	I Think I Spoke Too Soon	Rachel Chinouriri	9	29 October 2026	1
5 November 2026	1	The Black Parade	My Chemical Romance	1	5 November 2026	1
5 November 2026	1	Back to Black	Amy Winehouse	4	5 November 2026	1
5 November 2026	1	The Holy Bible Live	Manic Street Preachers	10	5 November 2026	1
12 November 2026	1	Perfecth	Queens of the Stone Age	1	12 November 2026	1
12 November 2026	1	Joy in Short Moments	The Snuts	4	12 November 2026	1
12 November 2026	1	Everything Under the Sun	Nickelback	6	12 November 2026	1
12 November 2026	1	Surface, Echo & Sound	Editors	7	12 November 2026	1
19 November 2026	1	Airplane Mode	James Blunt	1	19 November 2026	1
19 November 2026	1	Dead Company	Royal Blood	2	19 November 2026	1
19 November 2026	1	The Fork and Knife	Skepta	4	19 November 2026	1
19 November 2026	1	O My Beloved	Kings of Leon	5	19 November 2026	1
19 November 2026	1	Requiem for a Village	Steven Wilson	6	19 November 2026	1
19 November 2026	1	The Faith Tour	George Michael	7	19 November 2026	1
26 November 2026	1*	Carnaval de Luz	U2	1	26 November 2026	1
26 November 2026	1*	Rebecca	Becky Hill	6	26 November 2026	1
26 November 2026	1*	Alamo	Jake Bugg	8	26 November 2026	1

== Entries by artist ==
The following table shows artists who have achieved two or more top 10 entries in 2025, including albums that reached their peak in 2025. The figures only include main artists, with featured artists and appearances on compilation albums not counted individually for each artist. The total number of weeks an artist spent in the top ten in 2026 is also shown.

Entries	Artist	Weeks	Albums
5	Michael Jackson	44*	The Essential Michael Jackson, Number Ones, Michael: Songs from the Motion Picture, Thriller, Bad
3	Drake	6	Iceman, Maid of Honour, Habibti
2	Fleetwood Mac	37	Rumours, 50 Years – Don't Stop
2	Noah Kahan	15*	Stick Season, The Great Divide
2	Sabrina Carpenter	12	Short n' Sweet, Man's Best Friend
2	Alex Warren	11	You'll Be Alright, Kid (Chapter 1), Wildchild
2	Oasis	7	(What's the Story) Morning Glory?, Time Flies... 1994–2009
2	Charli XCX	3	Wuthering Heights, Music, Fashion, Film

== See also ==
- List of UK Albums Chart number ones of the 2020s

== Sources ==
- "Six decades of singles charts". The Official Charts Company. Archived from the original on 3 March 2011.
