= List of Official Albums Streaming Chart number ones of 2025 =

The Official Albums Streaming Chart is a weekly music chart in the United Kingdom which calculates the most popular albums on audio streaming sites.

== Number ones ==
Key
No.	nth album to top the Official Albums Streaming Chart
re	Return of an album to number one

Contents

No.	Artist (Note: The artist, song, date of reaching number one and number of weeks at number one are those given by the OCC.)	Album	Record label (Note: The record labels are those given by the OCC.)	Reached number one (for the week ending)	Weeks at number one	Ref.
re	Michael Bublé	Christmas	Reprise	2 January 2025	1	
re	Sabrina Carpenter	Short n' Sweet	Island	9 January 2025	4	
re	Sabrina Carpenter	Short n' Sweet	Island	16 January 2025	4	
re	Sabrina Carpenter	Short n' Sweet	Island	23 January 2025	4	
re	Sabrina Carpenter	Short n' Sweet	Island	30 January 2025	4	
131	Central Cee	Can't Rush Greatness	Columbia	6 February 2025	1	
132	The Weeknd	Hurry Up Tomorrow	Republic/XO	13 February 2025	2	
132	The Weeknd	Hurry Up Tomorrow	Republic/XO	20 February 2025	2	
133	PartyNextDoor and Drake	Some Sexy Songs 4 U	OVO/Republic	27 February 2025	1	
134	Tate McRae	So Close to What	RCA	6 March 2025	1	
re	Sabrina Carpenter	Short n' Sweet	Island	13 March 2025	2	
re	Sabrina Carpenter	Short n' Sweet	Island	20 March 2025	2	
135	Playboi Carti	Music	Interscope	27 March 2025	1	
re	Sabrina Carpenter	Short n' Sweet	Island	3 April 2025	7	
re	Sabrina Carpenter	Short n' Sweet	Island	10 April 2025	7	
re	Sabrina Carpenter	Short n' Sweet	Island	17 April 2025	7	
re	Sabrina Carpenter	Short n' Sweet	Island	24 April 2025	7	
re	Sabrina Carpenter	Short n' Sweet	Island	1 May 2025	7	
re	Sabrina Carpenter	Short n' Sweet	Island	8 May 2025	7	
re	Sabrina Carpenter	Short n' Sweet	Island	15 May 2025	7	
136	Sleep Token	Even in Arcadia	RCA	22 May 2025	1	
re	Sabrina Carpenter	Short n' Sweet	Island	29 May 2025	2	
re	Sabrina Carpenter	Short n' Sweet	Island	5 June 2025	2	
137	Ed Sheeran	+–=÷× (Tour Collection)	Asylum	12 June 2025	1	
re	Sabrina Carpenter	Short n' Sweet	Island	19 June 2025	2	
re	Sabrina Carpenter	Short n' Sweet	Island	26 June 2025	2	
re	Ed Sheeran	+–=÷× (Tour Collection)	Asylum	3 July 2025	2	
re	Ed Sheeran	+–=÷× (Tour Collection)	Asylum	10 July 2025	2	
re	Oasis	Time Flies... 1994–2009	Big Brother	17 July 2025	8	
re	Oasis	Time Flies... 1994–2009	Big Brother	24 July 2025	8	
re	Oasis	Time Flies... 1994–2009	Big Brother	31 July 2025	8	
re	Oasis	Time Flies... 1994–2009	Big Brother	7 August 2025	8	
re	Oasis	Time Flies... 1994–2009	Big Brother	14 August 2025	8	
re	Oasis	Time Flies... 1994–2009	Big Brother	21 August 2025	8	
re	Oasis	Time Flies... 1994–2009	Big Brother	28 August 2025	8	
re	Oasis	Time Flies... 1994–2009	Big Brother	4 September 2025	8	
138	Sabrina Carpenter	Man's Best Friend	Island	11 September 2025	4	
138	Sabrina Carpenter	Man's Best Friend	Island	18 September 2025	4	
138	Sabrina Carpenter	Man's Best Friend	Island	25 September 2025	4	
138	Sabrina Carpenter	Man's Best Friend	Island	2 October 2025	4	
139	Olivia Dean	The Art of Loving	Polydor	9 October 2025	1	
140	Taylor Swift	The Life of a Showgirl	EMI	16 October 2025	3	
140	Taylor Swift	The Life of a Showgirl	EMI	23 October 2025	3	
140	Taylor Swift	The Life of a Showgirl	EMI	30 October 2025	3	
141	Dave	The Boy Who Played the Harp	Neighbourhood	6 November 2025	1	
142	Lily Allen	West End Girl	BMG	13 November 2025	1	
re	Olivia Dean	The Art of Loving	Polydor	20 November 2025	6	
re	Olivia Dean	The Art of Loving	Polydor	27 November 2025	6	
re	Olivia Dean	The Art of Loving	Polydor	4 December 2025	6	
re	Olivia Dean	The Art of Loving	Polydor	11 December 2025	6	
re	Olivia Dean	The Art of Loving	Polydor	18 December 2025	6	
re	Olivia Dean	The Art of Loving	Polydor	25 December 2025	6	
