= Western Approaches (disambiguation) =

The Western Approaches is a section of the Atlantic Ocean.

Western Approaches may also refer to:

- Western Approaches Command, in World War II
  - Western Approaches Tactical Unit – British naval wargaming unit
  - Western Approaches Museum, heritage attraction within the former Liverpool base for Western Approaches Command
- Western Approaches (Steve Knightley, Seth Lakeman and Jenna Witts album), 2004
- Western Approaches (Red Rum Club album), 2024
- Western Approaches (film), 1944 docufiction film
