= Is This What You've Been Waiting For? (song) =

Single by Amy Macdonald

from the album Is This What You've Been Waiting For?
- Released: 24 April 2025
- Length: 3:34
- Label: Infectious Music; BMG
- Songwriters: Amy Macdonald; James Arter; Adam Falkner
- Producers: Nicolas Rebscher; Jim Abbiss; James Arter; Adam Falkner

Amy Macdonald singles chronology
"Bridges" (2021)	"Is This What You've Been Waiting For?" (2025)	"Forward" (2025)

"Is This What You've Been Waiting For?" is a 2025 single released by Scottish singer Amy Macdonald on 24 April 2025 as the lead single from her sixth studio album of the same name. Written by Macdonald, James Arter and Adam Falkner, it received its debut radio airplay on BBC Radio 2.

== Background ==
The inspiration for the song came from the rise in streaming services for music and the increase in demand for artists to release new music more often as a result. In an interview, Macdonald said that fans seem to "demand new music more often" as a result, and that the song was "my view on how people always expect more music and social media content". She further claimed she took inspiration from the opening of The Sphere in Las Vegas, saying that she "woke up one day and saw all of these videos of it, and I thought, this is incredible", before adding "really inspired me and made me think about how music is for me, and gigs have always been the most important part".

== Release ==
The single was officially released on 24 April 2025, and received its first airplay on BBC Radio 2 by Scott Mills. Afterwards, Macdonald said that, despite having been recording and releasing music "for eighteen years", hearing her songs on the radio "will never feel normal". Reviews for the song were positive, with one review saying that the song has a "blend of emotional depth with an urgent sense of forward motion", but having "connection and care". Music Talkers said that the song "is a reflection of where Amy is now – confident in her craft, rooted in gratitude, and still playing to sold-out crowds".

The release of the single marked her first release in four years, with her last single "Bridges" being released in 2021.

== Music video ==
The music video for the song was officially released on 29 April 2025, and features Macdonald primarily singing the song whilst driving in a car. Posting on her official X account, she claimed that the song was the "perfect road trip tune" which seems to reflect her vision for the music video. Visually, the music video blends "dramatic live action with handmade, collage-style animation", with the visual subverts being accredited as "narrative traits that recall Thelma and Louise and Fear and Loathing In Las Vegas vibes" as suggested by MC Gig Music. The video was directed by Jackson Ducasse who had previously directed videos for both Dua Lipa and Calum Scott.

Following its release, Macdonald spoke positively about the music video, saying that she was "thrilled with the response to my new song, totally bowled over with all the support". She further claimed that "it’s the perfect road trip tune, so join me in the music video for a wee drive".

== Chart performance ==
On 2 May 2025, the single debuted at number forty on the official UK Singles Downloads Chart, and number forty-one on the official UK Singles Sales Chart.

== Charts ==
Chart performance for "Is This What You've Been Waiting For?"
Chart (2025)	Peak position
UK Singles Downloads (Official Charts)	40
UK Singles Sales Charts (OCC)	41
