= Buck (album) =

Studio album by Red Rum Club
- Released: 5 September 2025
- Genres: Alternative rock; indie rock; Americana
- Length: 31:10
- Label: Modern Sky UK
- Producer: Richard Turvey

Red Rum Club chronology
Western Approaches (2024)	Buck (2025)

Singles from Buck
- 1. "American Nights & English Mornings" Released: 14 May 2025; 2. "Crush, TX" Released: 19 June 2025; 3. "Buck" Released: 7 August 2025; 4. "Wild" Released: 3 September 2025

Buck (stylised in all caps) is the fifth studio album by English band Red Rum Club. It was released on 5 September 2025 through Modern Sky.

The album debuted at number 7 on the UK Albums Chart, making it their highest-charting album to date.

== Critical reception ==
Jen Rose of Indiependent called the album a "fast-paced rock romp", praising the "heavy instrumentals and [sic] captivating lyrics" of the opening track, while favorably reviewing the rest of the singles.

== Track listing ==
All tracks are written by Fran Doran, Tom Williams, Michael McDermott, Joe Corby, Simon Hepworth, Neil Lawson & Richard Turvey, except where noted.

No.	Title	Writer(s)	Length
1.	"Crush, TX"		2:18
2.	"Taste"		2:34
3.	"American Nights & English Mornings"		3:14
4.	"Buck"		2:28
5.	"Call Me On Your Comedown"	Doran; Williams; McDermott; Corby; Hepworth; Lawson	2:45
6.	"Trouble In The Neighbourhood"		3:05
7.	"Wild"		2:38
8.	"Vanilla - Alt Mix"	Doran; Williams; McDermott; Corby; Hepworth; Lawson	2:34
9.	"Animal"		3:23
10.	"Wish I Was Here"		2:56
11.	"Someone's Baby Isn't Coming Home"		3:09
Total length:			31:10

== Charts ==
Chart performance
Chart (2025)	Peak position
Scottish Albums (Official Charts)	7
UK Albums (Official Charts)	7
UK Independent Albums (Official Charts)	2
