= +−=÷× (Tour Collection) =

Greatest hits album by Ed Sheeran
- Released: 27 September 2024
- Recorded: 2011–2023
- Length: 94:23
- Labels: Asylum; Atlantic
- Producers: Aaron Dessner; Benny Blanco; Charlie Hugall; Chris Leonard; Ed Sheeran; Fred; Jake Gosling; Jeff Bhasker; Max Martin; Mike Elizondo; Parisi; Pharrell Williams; Rick Rubin; Rudimental; Shellback; Steve Mac; Will Hicks

Ed Sheeran chronology
Autumn Variations (2023)	+−=÷× (Tour Collection) (2024)	Play (2025)

+−=÷× (Tour Collection) (pronounced The Mathematics Tour Collection) is a greatest hits album by English singer-songwriter Ed Sheeran. It was released on 27 September 2024, through Asylum and Atlantic Records. +−=÷× (Tour Collection) contains studio versions of Sheeran's biggest hits, along with hidden access to exclusive memos, available when purchasing the vinyl or CD. The album was preceded by the +−=÷× Tour. On 27 December 2024, +−=÷× (Tour Collection: Live) was released with live versions of songs from Sheeran's catalogue. The album peaked at number one in the United Kingdom and New Zealand, and reached the top ten in Ireland, Germany, Australia, and Canada.

== Commercial performance ==
+−=÷× (Tour Collection) topped the charts in the United Kingdom and New Zealand. It also reached numbers three in Ireland and Scotland, four in Australia, seven in Germany and Croatia, and nine in Canada. In the United States, the album peaked at number 17. It became the third best-selling album of 2025 in the UK and New Zealand. +−=÷× (Tour Collection) was certified diamond in Canada, triple platinum in New Zealand, double platinum in the UK, and platinum in France and Italy.

== Track listing ==
Standard edition track listing
No.	Title	Writer(s)	Producer(s)	Length
1.	"The A Team"	Ed Sheeran	Jake Gosling; Sheeran^{[a]}	4:18
2.	"You Need Me, I Don't Need You^{[b]}"	Sheeran	Gosling; Charlie Hugall; Sheeran^{[a]}	3:40
3.	"Lego House"	Sheeran; Gosling; Chris Leonard	Gosling; Sheeran^{[a]}	3:05
4.	"Give Me Love"	Sheeran; Gosling; C. Leonard	Gosling; Sheeran^{[a]}	5:23
5.	"Sing"	Sheeran; Pharrell Williams	Williams	3:55
6.	"Don't"	Sheeran; Benjamin Levin	Rick Rubin; Benny Blanco	3:39
7.	"Thinking Out Loud"	Sheeran; Amy Wadge	Gosling	4:41
8.	"Bloodstream"	Sheeran; Johnny McDaid; Gary Lightbody; Rudimental	Rubin	5:00
9.	"Photograph"	Sheeran; McDaid; Martin Harrington; Thomas Leonard	Jeff Bhasker; Emile Haynie^{[c]}	4:18
10.	"Tenerife Sea"	Sheeran; McDaid; Foy Vance	Rubin	4:01
11.	"I See Fire"	Sheeran	Sheeran	4:59
12.	"Lay It All on Me^{[b]}" (with Rudimental)	Amir Amor; Kesi Dryden; Piers Agget; Leon Rolle; James Newman; Jonny Harris; Sheeran	Rudimental; Ben Humphreys^{[c]}	4:02
13.	"Castle on the Hill"	Sheeran; Levin	Blanco; Sheeran	4:21
14.	"Shape of You"	Sheeran; McDaid; Steve Mac	Mac; Sheeran^{[a]}	3:53
15.	"Galway Girl"	Sheeran; Vance; McDaid; Wadge; Eamon Murray; Niamh Dunne; Liam Bradley; Damian McKee; Seán Óg Graham	Mike Elizondo	2:48
16.	"Perfect"	Sheeran	Will Hicks; Sheeran; Blanco^{[c]}	4:23
17.	"Happier"	Sheeran; Levin; Ryan Tedder	Blanco	3:27
18.	"Dive"	Sheeran; Levin; Julia Michaels	Blanco	3:58
19.	"I Don't Care" (with Justin Bieber)	Sheeran; Fred Gibson; Max Martin; Shellback; Bieber; Jason Boyd	Martin; Shellback; Fred	3:39
20.	"Beautiful People" (featuring Khalid)	Sheeran; F. Gibson; Martin; Shellback; Khalid Robinson	Shellback; Martin; Fred; Sheeran; Alex Gibson^{[c]}	3:17
21.	"Afterglow"	Sheeran; David Hodges; F. Gibson	Sheeran; Fred; Parisi	3:05
22.	"Bad Habits"	Sheeran; F. Gibson; McDaid	Sheeran; Fred; McDaid; Parisi^{[c]}	3:50
23.	"Shivers"	Sheeran; McDaid; Mac; Kal Lavelle	Sheeran; Mac; Fred	3:27
24.	"Eyes Closed"	Sheeran; F. Gibson; Martin; Shellback	Fred; Martin; Shellback; Aaron Dessner	3:14
Total length:				1:34:13

Christmas edition bonus track
No.	Title	Writer(s)	Producer(s)	Length
25.	"Merry Christmas" (with Elton John)	Sheeran; John	Mac	3:28
Total length:				1:37:30

Japanese edition bonus track
No.	Title	Writer(s)	Producer(s)	Length
23.	"Celestial"	Sheeran; Mac; McDaid	Sheeran; Mac	3:29
Total length:				1:30:06

Live edition bonus disc track listing
No.	Title	Writer(s)	Length
1.	"Tides^{[e]}" (live)	Sheeran; McDaid; Vance	3:20
2.	"Blow^{[e]}" (live)	Sheeran; Chris Stapleton; Bruno Mars; Brody Brown; Frank Rogers; J.T. Cure; Bard McNamee; Greg McKee	3:22
3.	"Castle on the Hill" (live)	Sheeran; Levin	4:26
4.	"Shivers" (live)	Sheeran; McDaid; Mac; Lavelle	4:28
5.	"The A Team" (live)	Sheeran	4:18
6.	"Don't/Nina" (live medley)	Sheeran; Levin; McDaid	6:11
7.	"Lego House" (live)	Sheeran; Gosling; Leonard	3:32
8.	"Dive^{[e]}" (live)	Sheeran; Levin; Michaels	4:20
9.	"I See Fire^{[e]}" (live)	Sheeran	8:03
10.	"Eyes Closed" (live)	Sheeran; F. Gibson; Martin; Shellback	4:12
11.	"Give Me Love" (live)	Sheeran; Gosling; C. Leonard	6:57
12.	"Collaborations Medley^{[d]}^{[e]}" (live)		6:41
13.	"Lay It All on Me^{[e]}" (live)	Amor; Dryden; Agget; Rolle; Newman; Harris; Sheeran	3:53
14.	"Overpass Graffiti^{[e]}" (live)	Sheeran; McDaid; F. Gibson	4:16
15.	"Galway Girl" (live)	Sheeran; Vance; McDaid; Wadge; Murray; Dunne; Bradley; McKee; Graham	2:37
16.	"Thinking Out Loud" (live)	Sheeran; Wadge	5:20
17.	"Sing" (live)	Sheeran; Williams	4:59
18.	"Photograph" (live)	Sheeran; McDaid; Harrington; Leonard	5:13
19.	"Tenerife Sea" (live)	Sheeran; McDaid; Vance	6:10
20.	"Happier" (live)	Sheeran; Levin; Tedder	3:48
21.	"Perfect" (live)	Sheeran	3:59
22.	"Bloodstream" (live)	Sheeran; McDaid; Lightbody; Rudimental	6:30
23.	"Afterglow^{[f]}" (live)	Sheeran; Hodges; F. Gibson	4:38
24.	"You Need Me, I Don't Need You" (live)	Sheeran	8:03
25.	"Shape of You" (live)	Sheeran; McDaid; Mac	4:46
26.	"Bad Habits" (live)	Sheeran; F. Gibson; McDaid	4:47
Total length:			2:12:22

Notes

- ^{^[d]} "Collaborations Medley" (live) consists of: "Take Me Back to London", "River", "Peru", "Cross Me", "Beautiful People", "South of the Border", "Own It" and "I Don't Care"
- ^{^[b]} "You Need Me, I Don't Need You" and "Lay It All on Me" are included on the digital and streaming editions only
- ^{^[f]} The live version of "Afterglow" is included on the cassette, digital and streaming editions only
- ^{^[e]} The live versions of "Tides", "Blow", "Dive", "I See Fire", "Collaborations Medley", "Lay It All on Me", "Overpass Graffiti" and "Happier" are included on the digital and streaming editions only
- ^{^[a]} signifies a co-producer
- ^{^[c]} signifies an additional producer

== Charts ==
=== Weekly charts ===
Weekly chart performance for +−=÷× (Tour Collection)
Chart (2024–2025)	Peak position
Australian Albums (ARIA)	4
Austrian Albums (Ö3 Austria)	14
Belgian Albums (Ultratop Flanders)	13
Belgian Albums (Ultratop Wallonia)	42
Canadian Albums (Billboard)	9
Croatian International Albums (HDU)	17
Danish Vinyl Albums (Hitlisten)	4
Dutch Albums (Album Top 100)	25
French Albums (SNEP)	15
German Albums (Offizielle Top 100)	7
Hungarian Albums (MAHASZ)	13
Irish Albums (Official Charts)	3
Italian Albums (FIMI)	15
Japanese Hot Albums (Billboard Japan)	62
New Zealand Albums (RMNZ)	1
Polish Albums (ZPAV)	92
Portuguese Albums (AFP)	72
Scottish Albums (Official Charts)	3
Spanish Albums (PROMUSICAE)	41
Swiss Albums (Schweizer Hitparade)	19
UK Albums (Official Charts)	1
US Billboard 200	17

Weekly chart performance for +−=÷× (Tour Collection: Live)
Chart (2025)	Peak position
Japanese Download Albums (Billboard Japan)	39
Japanese Digital Albums (Oricon)	42
Croatian International Albums (HDU)	7
Swiss Albums (Schweizer Hitparade)	37

=== Year-end charts ===
2024 year-end chart performance for +−=÷× (Tour Collection)
Chart (2024)	Position
New Zealand Albums (RMNZ)	44
UK Albums (OCC)	79
French Albums (SNEP)	165
Australian Albums (ARIA)	85

2025 year-end chart performance for +−=÷× (Tour Collection)
Chart (2025)	Position
Canadian Albums (Billboard)	22
US Billboard 200	39
New Zealand Albums (RMNZ)	3
French Albums (SNEP)	34
UK Albums (OCC)	3
Australian Albums (ARIA)	11

== Certifications ==
Certifications for +−=÷× (Tour Collection)
Region	Certification	Certified units/sales
Canada (Music Canada)	Diamond	800,000^{‡}
France (SNEP)	Platinum	100,000^{‡}
Italy (FIMI)	Platinum	50,000^{‡}
New Zealand (RMNZ)	3× Platinum	45,000^{‡}
United Kingdom (BPI)	2× Platinum	600,000^{‡}
^{‡} Sales+streaming figures based on certification alone.

== Release history ==
Release history and formats for +−=÷× (Tour Collection)
Region	Date	Format(s)	Edition(s)	Label	Ref.
Various	27 September 2024	CD; vinyl; digital download; streaming	Standard	Asylum; Atlantic	
Japan	27 September 2024	CD	Japanese	Asylum; Atlantic	
Various	6 December 2024	Digital download; streaming	Christmas	Asylum; Atlantic	
Various	27 December 2024	Cassette; CD; digital download; streaming	Live	Asylum; Atlantic	
