= Bloodletting (Røry album) =

Studio album by Røry
- Released: 11 September 2026
- Length: 37:08
- Label: Sadcøre
- Producer: Kingdoms

Røry chronology
Restoration (2025)	Bloodletting (2026)

Bloodletting is the second studio album by the English singer-songwriter Røry. It was released on 11 September 2026 through her independent record label, Sadcøre Records. The album features 13 tracks and was produced by Kingdoms, with additional production and mixing by Dan Lancaster.

== Background ==
Following the release of her debut studio album Restoration in 2025, RØRY announced BLOODLETTING on 28 May 2026. The album was initially announced for release on 4 September through SADCØRE Records, before its release date was subsequently set for 11 September.

In discussing the album, RØRY explained that she had become tired of prioritising other people's feelings at the expense of her own. She described the project as a way of reclaiming parts of herself that she had suppressed through years of trying to be understanding and forgiving.

The album explores grief, anger, mortality and the desire to continue living. Its heavier musical direction reflects RØRY's move towards more aggressive vocal performances and alternative metal influences while retaining the personal songwriting that characterised her earlier work.

== Singles ==
"Degradation", "Dead Girl Watching" and "Kids These Days" were released ahead of the album and subsequently included on its track listing. "Strange" was released alongside the album announcement on 28 May 2026.

"Degradation" explores emotional distress, while "Kids These Days" takes a more satirical approach to generational attitudes and social criticism. "Dead Girl Watching" contrasts with the album's darker material through its emphasis on survival and renewed optimism.

"Strange" combines pop-ballad elements with heavier alternative metal influences. Its lyrics reflect RØRY's changing relationship with life and her recognition of the unexpected ways in which her outlook had changed.

== Critical reception ==
Professional ratings
Review scores
Source	Rating
Distorted Sound	9/10

Writing for Distorted Sound, Lucy Dunnet awarded Bloodletting a score of 9 out of 10. Dunnet praised the album's emotional intensity, its combination of melodic and aggressive vocal performances, and its expansion into heavier musical territory. The review highlighted the record's treatment of grief and mortality, particularly in "a cure for cancer" and "Mortal", as well as its juxtaposition of anger and humour in "KIDS THESE DAYS". Dunnet also praised the contrast between the album's heavier songs and the more restrained "hometown", and described "Strange" as a fitting potential conclusion to the record before the final spoken-word track.

== Track listing ==
All lyrics are written by Roxanne Emery; all music is composed by Emery, Dominic Liu, and Seán McDonagh, except "Dead Girl Walking" (composed with Dan Lancaster).

Bloodletting track listing
No.	Title	Length
1.	"Welcome to Bloodletting"	1:26
2.	"Degradation"	3:49
3.	"Swallow"	3:29
4.	"A Cure for Cancer"	3:24
5.	"Mortal"	3:25
6.	"The Death of a People Pleaser"	0:28
7.	"Kids These Days"	3:10
8.	"Dead Girl Walking"	3:29
9.	"Grey"	3:35
10.	"Oh When the Saints"	1:16
11.	"Hometown"	3:26
12.	"Strange"	3:47
13.	"Do You Want to Live?"	2:24
Total length:		37:08

=== Notes ===
- "Welcome to Bloodletting", "The Death of a People Pleaser", "Oh When the Saints", and "Do You Want to Live?" are stylized in square brackets and all lowercase (e.g., "[welcome to bloodletting]".
- "Degradation", "Swallow", "Mortal", "Kids These Days", "Dead Girl Walking", "Grey", and "Strange" are stylized in all caps.
- "A Cure for Cancer" is stylized in all lowercase.

== Personnel ==
Credits are adapted from Tidal.

- Røry – vocals
- Dominic Liu – production (all tracks), programming (tralks 1, 3–13); guitar, keyboards (1, 3–9, 11–13); drum kit (3–5, 7–9, 12), bass (8)
- Seán McDonagh –production (all tracks), programming (1, 3–13); guitar, keyboards (1, 3–9, 11–13); drum kit (3–5, 7–9, 12), bass (8)
- Dan Lancaster – production assistance, mixing
- Kevin Peterson – mastering
- Dan Weller – drum kit, guitar, programming, synthesizer (2)
- Pete Daynes – background vocals, bass (4, 7, 11)
- Jamie Oldfield – guitar (5, 9, 12)
- Conor Cosimini – engineering (10)
- Hattie Moran – guitar (10)
- Alex Davies – string arrangement, string section (11)

== Charts ==
Chart performance for BLOODLETTING
Chart (2026)	Peak position
UK Albums (Official Charts)	8
UK Rock & Metal Albums (Official Charts)	1
Scottish Albums (Official Charts)	3
UK Independent Albums (Official Charts)	3
