= The Jompson Brothers =

American rock band (2007–2013)

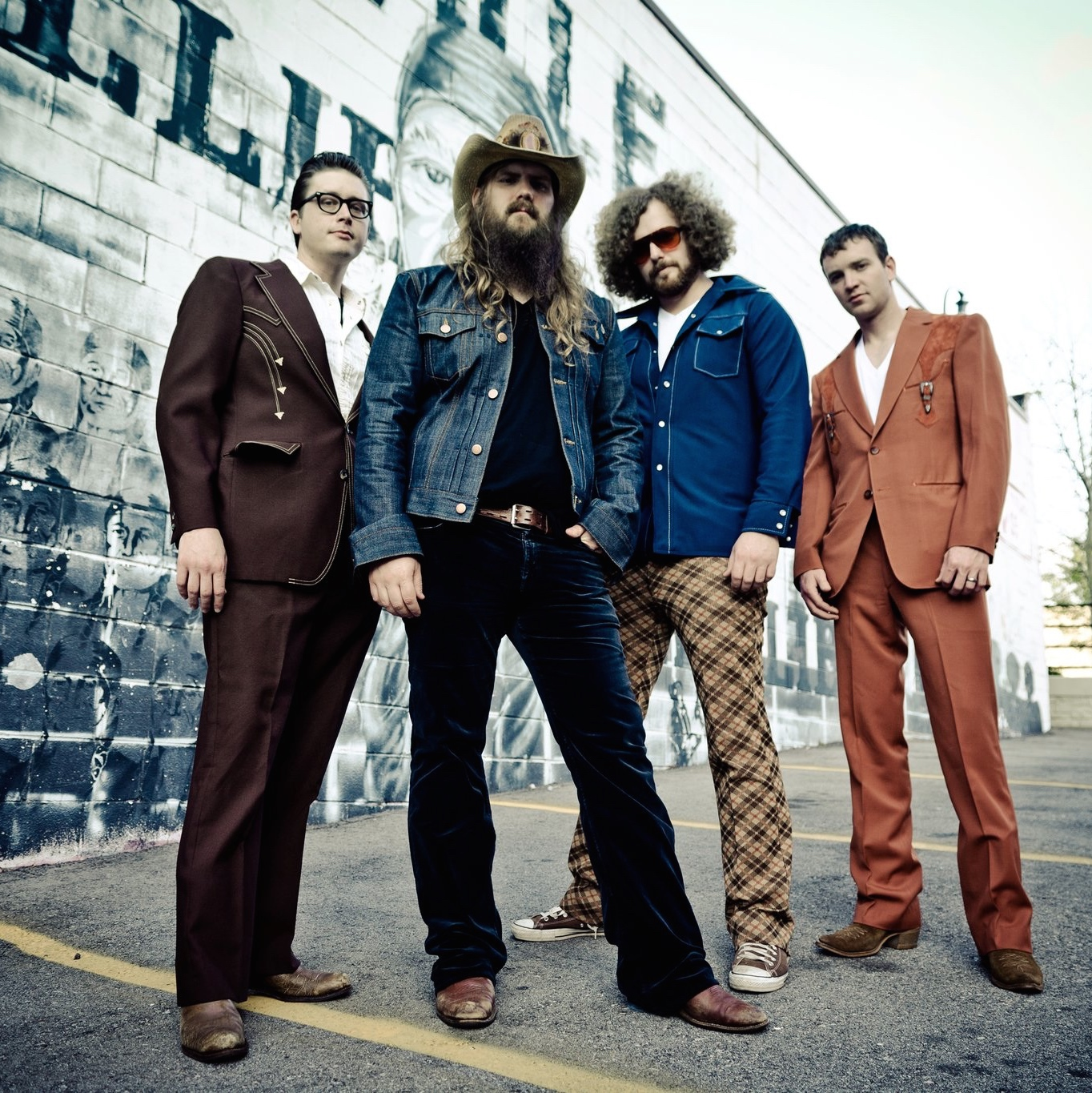
- The Jompson Brothers in 2011 The Jompson Brothers in 2011

Background information
- Origin: Nashville, Tennessee
- Genres: Rock; Southern rock; roots rock
- Years active: 2007–2013
- Past members: Chris Stapleton; Greg McKee; Bard McNamee; J.T. Cure
- Website: thejompsonbrothers.com

The Jompson Brothers were an American country rock band that formed in Nashville, Tennessee in 2007. The band was composed of Chris Stapleton (lead vocals, rhythm guitar), Greg McKee (lead guitar), Bard McNamee (drums), and J.T. Cure (bass).

Following Stapleton's departure from The SteelDrivers in early 2010, The Jompson Brothers began regularly touring the southeastern US. Following a festival performance in Morehead, Kentucky, No Depression called the band "the future of rock 'n' roll."

Zac Brown Band hand-picked The Jompson Brothers to perform on their Sixthman-produced, Sailing Southern Ground Cruise in September 2010.

The Jompson Brothers independently released their self-titled debut album in November 2010.

Jason Aldean uses The Jompson Brothers' song, "Secret Weapon" as his intro music every night for his live shows and has described it as "just one of those songs that gets you fired up and ready to go."

== Discography ==
=== Studio albums ===
- The Jompson Brothers (2010)
