= Chris Stapleton =

American singer-songwriter (born 1978)

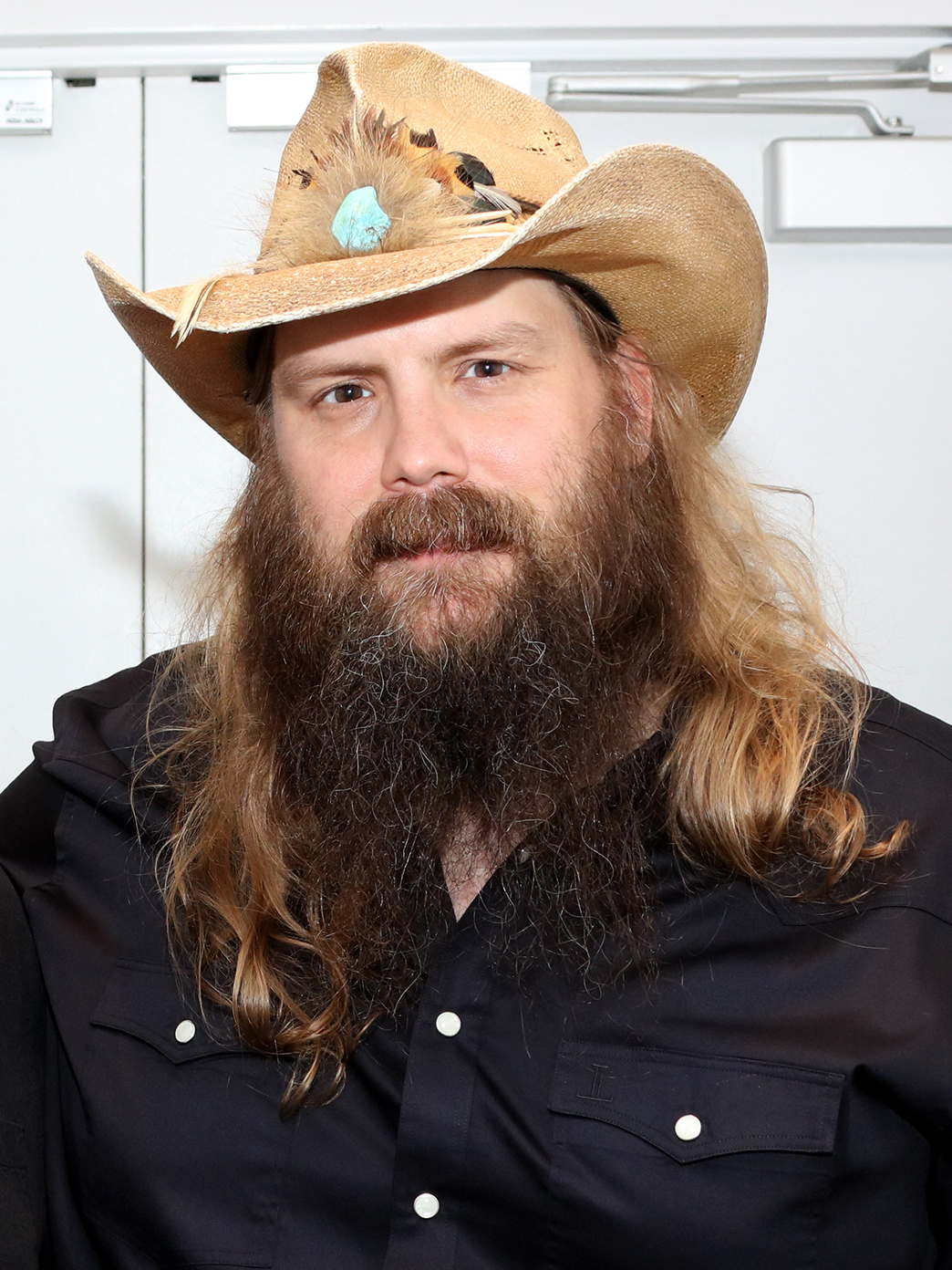
- Stapleton in 2019

Background information
- Born: Christopher Alvin Stapleton; April 15, 1978 (age 48); Lexington, Kentucky, U.S.
- Origin: Staffordsville, Kentucky, U.S. Nashville, Tennessee, U.S.
- Genres: Country; soul; country rock; bluegrass
- Occupations: Singer-songwriter; guitarist; record producer
- Instruments: Vocals; guitar
- Years active: 2001−present
- Label: Mercury Nashville
- Formerly of: The SteelDrivers; The Jompson Brothers
- Spouse: Morgane Hayes (m. 2007)
- Awards: Full list
- Website: chrisstapleton.com

Christopher Alvin Stapleton (born April 15, 1978) is an American singer-songwriter and guitarist. Born in Kentucky, he moved to Nashville in 1996 to study engineering at Vanderbilt University, but dropped out to pursue a career in music. Shortly after, Stapleton signed a contract with Sea Gayle Music to write and publish his music.

Stapleton has co-written six number-one singles for other artists on the Hot Country Songs chart including Kenny Chesney's five-week number-one "Never Wanted Nothing More", Josh Turner's "Your Man", George Strait's "Love's Gonna Make It Alright", and Luke Bryan's "Drink a Beer". He has been credited on albums for artists including Adele, Kelly Clarkson, Brad Paisley, Dierks Bentley, and Taylor Swift. Stapleton has also co-written with SZA, Kehlani, Sheryl Crow, and Ed Sheeran, among others.

As a recording artist, Stapleton served as a vocalist in two bands: the bluegrass ensemble the SteelDrivers and the rock band the Jompson Brothers, before emerging as a solo act. His debut solo album, Traveller (2015), peaked on top of the US Billboard 200 and received septuple platinum certification by the Recording Industry Association of America (RIAA). Stapleton's 2015 cover of the song "Tennessee Whiskey" received diamond certification by the RIAA. His second studio album, From A Room: Volume 1 (2017) earned him a second CMA Award for Album of the Year and a Grammy Award for Best Country Album. Stapleton's third, From A Room: Volume 2 (2017) peaked at number two on the Billboard 200, and his fourth, Starting Over (2020), won his third Grammy for Best Country Album. The title track was issued as its lead single.

Stapleton has been recognized with awards including 11 Grammy Awards, 11 Academy of Country Music (ACM) Awards, and 15 Country Music Association (CMA) Awards. He was named the ACM's Artist-Songwriter of the Decade in September 2019. In 2023, Rolling Stone ranked Stapleton at number 170 on its list of the 200 Greatest Singers of All Time.

== Early life ==
Stapleton was born on April 15, 1978, in Lexington, Kentucky. His mother, Carol J. (née Mace) Stapleton, worked at the local health department and his father, Herbert Joseph Stapleton Jr. (1946–2013), was an engineer in coal mines. Stapleton comes from a family of coal miners. He has an older brother, Herbert Joseph III, and a younger sister, Melanie Brooke.

Stapleton grew up in the small town of Staffordsville, Kentucky, right outside of Paintsville, which is between Staffordsville and Paintsville Lake, a reservoir. Staffordsville is east of Lexington. He graduated from Johnson Central High School in Paintsville where he played football—opposite future NFL draft number one pick Tim Couch on three occasions—and was class valedictorian.

== Career ==
=== Career beginnings and bands ===
In 1996, Stapleton moved to Nashville to study biomedical engineering at Vanderbilt University. He switched to business school (Vanderbilt did not have an undergraduate business school in the 1990s), but when he discovered that songwriting could be a career after meeting a salaried songwriter, Stapleton took to songwriting instead. He signed with publishing house Sea Gayle Music shortly after moving to Nashville and earned a reputation as a versatile and prolific songwriter. Over the next 10 years, Stapleton wrote more than one thousand songs.

In 2007, Stapleton formed a bluegrass group, the SteelDrivers, to perform his songs. The band had two hit records; each peaked at number 2 on the bluegrass chart before Stapleton left in 2010 to form a Southern rock band called the Jompson Brothers, which consisted of Stapleton on vocals, Greg McKee on guitar, J.T. Cure on bass, and Bard McNamee on drums. They toured regionally until 2013 and at one point opened for the Zac Brown Band. The band independently released a self-titled album in November 2010, after which Stapleton went solo. The title track of his first album, Traveller, was composed while he and his wife were on a road trip to New Mexico in 2013.

In 2013, Stapleton signed to Mercury Nashville, a division of Universal Music Group Nashville, as a solo artist. His first single, "What Are You Listening To?", was released in October 2013, but did not perform as expected. The single was part of an album that was recorded, but never released. Stapleton also cowrote the theme "All-Nighter Comin'" to the WSM-AM show The WSM All Nighter with Marcia Campbell, an American radio show with a large trucker following. He co-wrote the song with Vince Gill and Al Anderson and Gill featured on vocals on the track. Songs written by Stapleton have been included in the soundtracks of several feature films, including Valentine's Day, Alvin and the Chipmunks: The Road Chip, and Hell or High Water.

In 2013, Stapleton and his wife Morgane sang the Waylon Jennings song "Amanda" live at the Grand Ole Opry. They also played a NPR Tiny Desk Concert in November 2015. At the 2014 CMT Artist of the Year event, Stapleton performed with Lady A, who played Stapleton's song, "Drink a Beer", which Luke Bryan had recorded, in honor of Bryan who was unable to attend the ceremony. Stapleton had previously sung it during Bryan's 2013 CMA Awards performance of the same song.

=== Solo studio albums ===
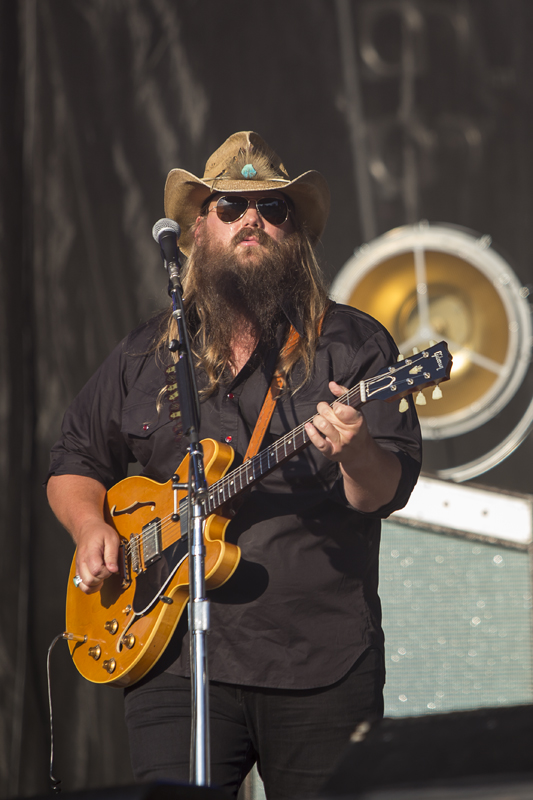
Stapleton at the Austin City Limits Music Festival in October 2016

Stapleton's debut solo album, Traveller, was released on May 5, 2015. It was recorded in Nashville's RCA Studio A. Stapleton co-produced the album with producer Dave Cobb. On the album, Stapleton played guitar and sang with a live band made up of bass player J.T. Cure (from the Jompson Brothers), pedal steel player Robby Turner, drummer Derek Mixon, Mickey Raphael on harmonica, and wife Morgane Stapleton singing harmonies. Stapleton emphasized the importance of the band lineup that came together during the making and promotion of the record. He said his familiarity with Cure and Mixon (he had known and played with Cure for over 20 years), plus Cobb's producing, which included contributing acoustic guitar, had added to the richness of making the record.

Stapleton composed the title track "Traveller" as he and his wife Morgane were driving through New Mexico on their way back to Nashville in a 1979 Jeep that Morgane had bought him, which they had flown to Phoenix, to acquire. She helped Stapleton to sift through 15 years of songs to pick nine to record.

Stapleton won three awards at the 2015 Country Music Association Awards: Album of the Year, Male Vocalist of the Year, and New Artist of the Year. At the CMA Awards, he performed with Justin Timberlake his version of the song popularized as a David Allan Coe live-show staple, "Tennessee Whiskey", and Timberlake's "Drink You Away". This performance was considered a career-defining moment by music publications, and with his wins that night he was lifted to national prominence. In December 2015, Stapleton received the 2015 CMT Artists of the Year Breakout award during a live performance at the annual CMT Artists of the Year show. Traveller was nominated for the Grammy Award for Album of the Year and won the categories Best Country Album and Best Country Solo Performance. It also won the Academy of Country Music Award for Album of the Year and was the top selling country album of 2016. The album had sold a total of 2 million copies in the US by July 2017.

In 2016, Stapleton, with Morgane, contributed the track "You Are My Sunshine" to producer Dave Cobb's compilation record project, Southern Family. Stapleton collaborated with Jake Owen on the song "If He Ain't Gonna Love You" on Owen's album American Love. Stapleton performed on the main stage at the 2016 Country to Country festival in Europe along with Andrew Combs, Kacey Musgraves and headliner Eric Church. Stapleton was the musical guest on the Saturday Night Live episode which aired January 16, 2016, alongside host Adam Driver. Stapleton performed "Parachute" and "Nobody to Blame" from Traveller.

In January 2016, Stapleton performed "Either Way", a song he had written with Kendall Marvel and Tim James, at the Country Radio Hall of Fame's Country Radio Seminar in Nashville. Lee Ann Womack had previously recorded it for her 2008 album, Call Me Crazy. The track was featured on his second studio album, From A Room: Volume 1, released on May 5, 2017. Volume 1 was named after Nashville's RCA Studio A, where it was recorded during the winter of 2016–17. That same month, Stapleton embarked on his All-American Road Show Tour. Volume 1 was certified gold in the US, giving Stapleton his second CMA for Album of the Year, and became the best-selling country album of 2017. Stapleton's third studio album, From A Room: Volume 2, was released on December 1, 2017. Both albums, Volume 1 and Volume 2, debuted at number two on the Billboard 200 charts.

Stapleton was the musical guest on Saturday Night Live for a second time on January 27, 2018, where he performed songs from From A Room: Volume 2 with Sturgill Simpson. In March, "Broken Halos" on From A Room: Volume 1 reached the top of the Country Airplay chart. It earned Stapleton accolades for Song and Single of the Year at the 52nd CMAs. He won Male Vocalist of the Year for a fourth time.

On August 28, 2020, Stapleton released a single, "Starting Over", a song he previously performed on tour. It was the lead single from his album of the same name and was his first single release since 2018's "Millionaire". Stapleton released a second single, "Cold", on September 25. He was Male Vocalist of the Year for the fourth time at the 2021 Country Music Association Awards, and Male Artist of the Year for the third time at the 2022 Academy of Country Music Awards, where he performed "You'll Never Leave Harlan Alive" with Patty Loveless.

=== Other projects and collaborations ===
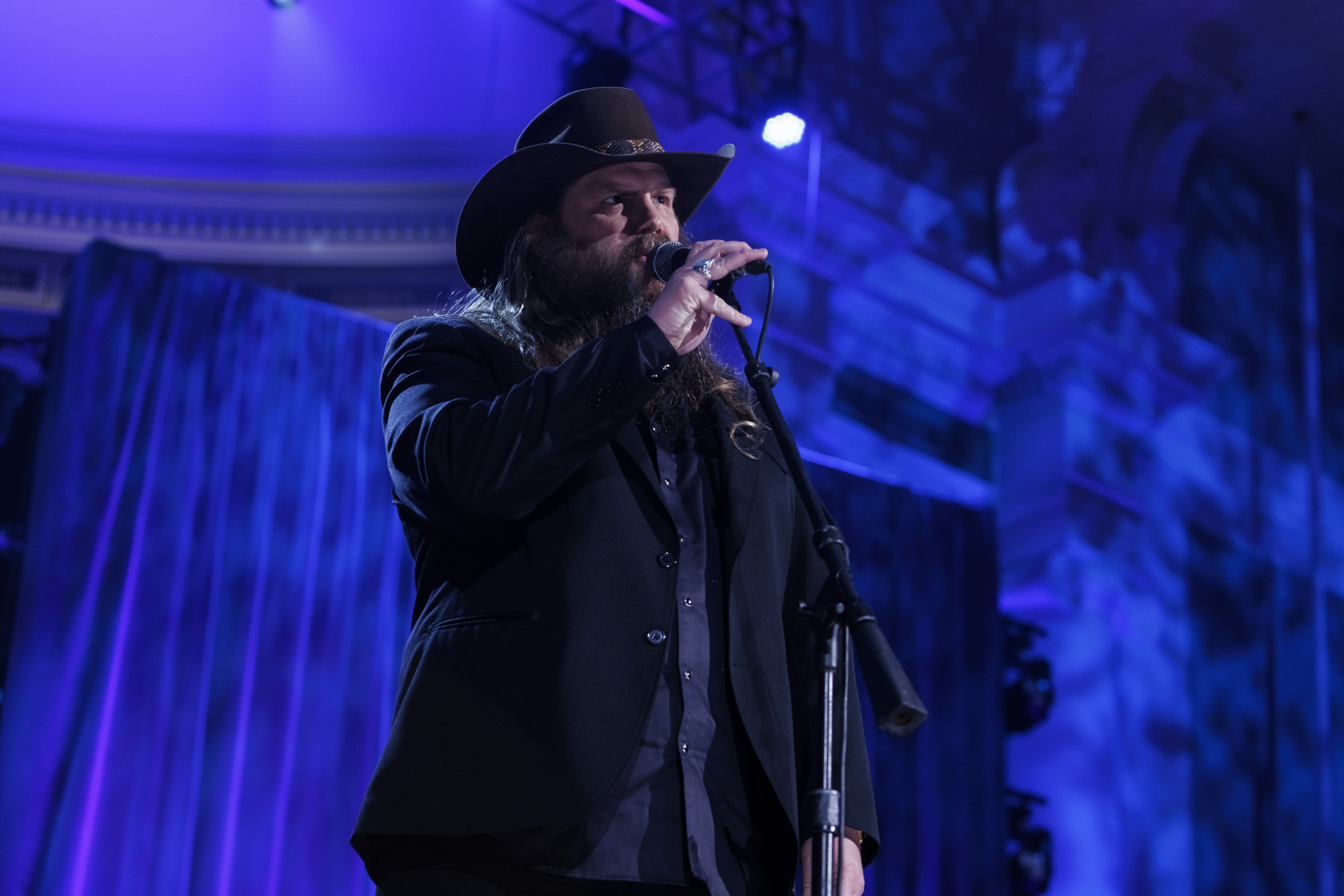
Stapleton at the 2022 Gershwin Prize

Stapleton co-wrote three songs for Justin Timberlake's studio album Man of the Woods (2018), including their collaboration "Say Something", which reached the top 10 list on the US Billboard Hot 100 chart. That same year, Stapleton recorded a cover of "I Want Love" for Restoration: Reimagining the Songs of Elton John and Bernie Taupin.

On April 28, 2019, Stapleton appeared as an extra in "The Long Night", the third episode of the eighth season of the HBO series Game of Thrones.

On July 5, 2019, Stapleton, together with Bruno Mars and Ed Sheeran, released Blow, on which Stapleton contributed songwriting and vocals. Bruno Mars played all instruments on the track except bass guitar. The song was written in a basement in Nashville.

On August 8, 2019, John Mayer invited Stapleton on stage at his concert to perform a song they had written the day before, titled "I Just Remembered That I Didn't Care". He stayed on stage for a performance of Mayer's "Slow Dancing in a Burning Room".

Over the course of 2019 and 2020, Stapleton recorded and wrote songs with Mike Campbell, formerly the guitarist of Tom Petty and the Heartbreakers. Campbell and fellow Heartbreaker Benmont Tench played on Stapleton's album Starting Over, and Stapleton featured on the Dirty Knobs' album Wreckless Abandon.

On August 5, 2021, Stapleton was featured on Taylor Swift's second re-recorded album, Red (Taylor's Version), on the track "I Bet You Think About Me". Stapleton contributed a cover of the Metallica song "Nothing Else Matters" to the charity tribute album The Metallica Blacklist, released in September 2021. He was credited as a vocalist on Adele's album 30, appearing on an alternative version of "Easy on Me".

Stapleton collaborated with Rage Against the Machine and Audioslave guitarist Tom Morello in the writing and performance of the track "The War Inside" on Morello's 2021 album The Atlas Underground Fire.

On February 12, 2023, at Super Bowl LVII, Stapleton sang the United States' national anthem at State Farm Stadium in Glendale, Arizona. The lyrics were signed in American Sign Language by Oscar-winning actor Troy Kotsur.

Stapleton was joined by Cindy Blackman Santana and Snoop Dogg in recording a cover of Phil Collins' "In the Air Tonight" as the 2023 opening theme song for Monday Night Football.

== Artistry ==
Stapleton's musical influences range from outlaw country and bluegrass to rock and roll and blues. NPR and Paste magazine described his sound as a blend of country, classic rock and Southern soul. Before going solo, Stapleton led the progressive bluegrass band the SteelDrivers and the rock and roll band the Jompson Brothers. His first solo album, Traveller, was an old-school country, Southern rock and bluegrass record; his second, From A Room: Volume 1, focused on country, blues and roots rock. Stapleton played acoustic guitar and electric guitar on both albums.

Stapleton is a soul singer with a tenor vocal range. Los Angeles Times writer Randy Lewis said in 2015 that his singing recalled "the note-bending style of country that traces to Merle Haggard and Lefty Frizzell and the gut-wrenching expressionism of blues and R&B perfected by Ray Charles", while his guitar performances elicited "memories of Texas blues rocker Stevie Ray Vaughan". Stapleton has cited Charles, Otis Redding, and Freddie King as some of his musical influences, along with Kentucky-based country artists, Keith Whitley, Dwight Yoakam and Patty Loveless. [...] "Those names are just part of life in Kentucky. You can't help but be aware of them and be influenced by them."

== Personal life ==
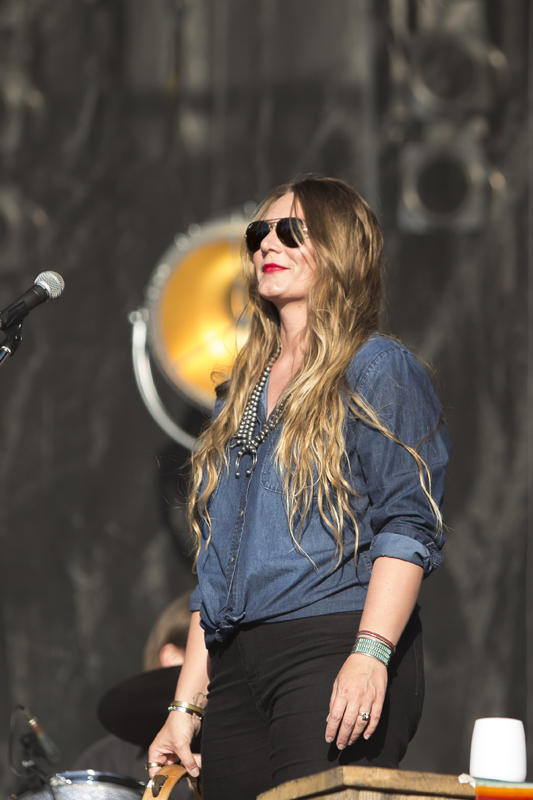
Morgane Stapleton in 2016

Stapleton has been married to singer-songwriter Morgane Hayes since 2007. They met while working at adjacent publishing houses. Stapleton and his wife live in Nashville and have five children together: a son born in 2009, a daughter born in 2010, twin sons born in 2018, and a son born in 2019.

== Awards ==
Stapleton has received numerous awards and nominations. He is the recipient of 12 Grammy Awards, 11 Academy of Country Music Awards, 15 Country Music Association Awards, five Billboard Music Awards, two iHeartRadio Music Awards, among others. For his work as composer, Stapleton has earned nine ASCAP Country awards, including the Vanguard Award. In 2019, he was recognized by the Academy of Country Music as the inaugural ACM artist-songwriter of the decade. Traveller was Billboard's Top Country Album of the decade.

== Discography ==
- Traveller (2015)
- From A Room: Volume 1 (2017)
- From A Room: Volume 2 (2017)
- Starting Over (2020)
- Higher (2023)

== Tours and concerts ==
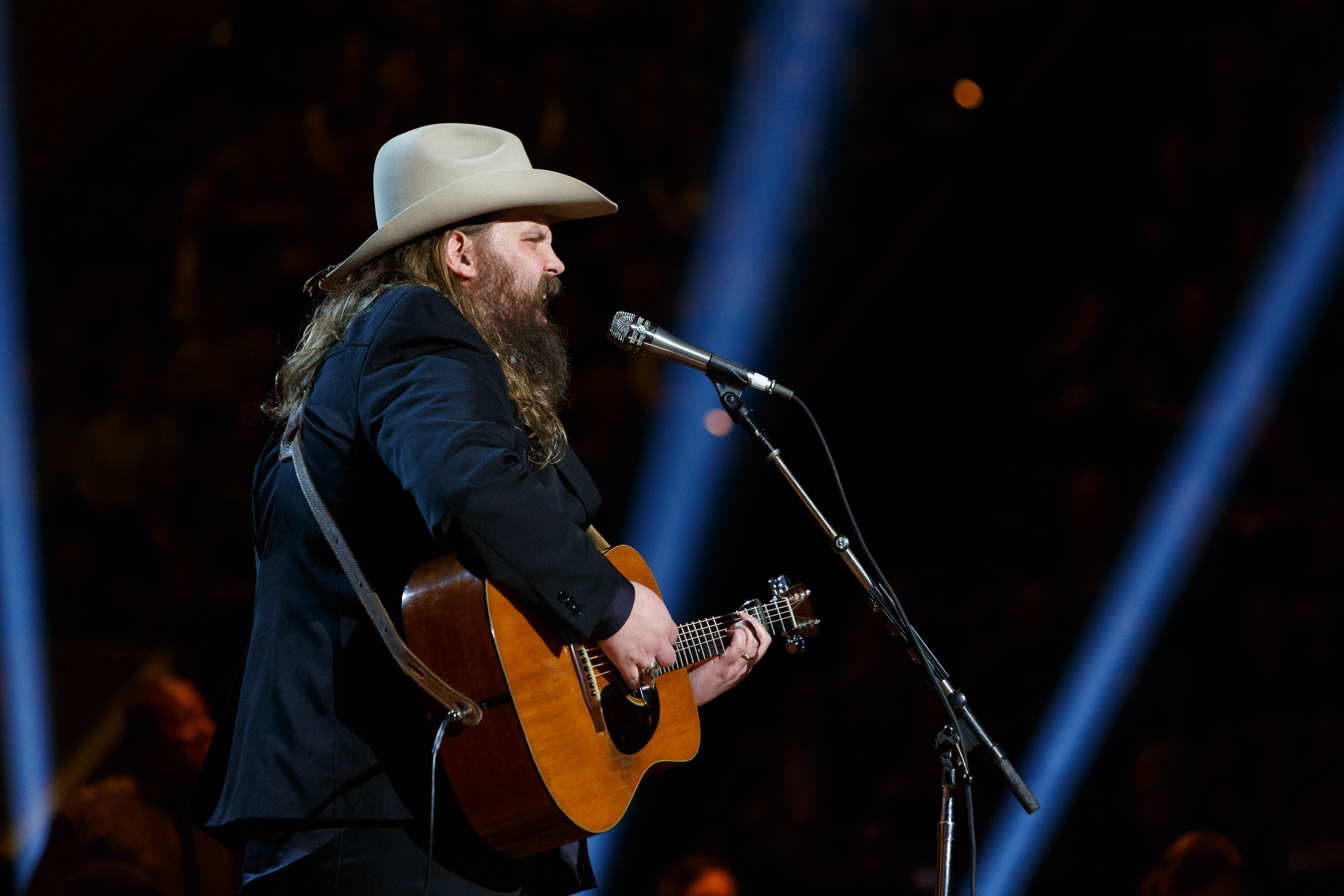
Stapleton performing in Washington, D.C., in 2020

Headlining

- Chris Stapleton's All-American Road Show Tour (2017–present)

Co-headlining

- Hank Williams Jr. and Chris Stapleton Live in Concert (with Hank Williams Jr.) (2016)
- A Concert for Kentucky, An Outlaw State of Kind Benefit (with Willie Nelson, Sheryl Crow, and Madeline Edwards) (April 23, 2022) — the first-ever concert at Kroger Field, home to Kentucky Wildcats football

Opening act

- Outsiders Tour (Eric Church) (2015)
- The Ashes and Dust World Tour (Warren Haynes) (2015)
- Not in This Lifetime... Tour (Guns N' Roses; one date) (2016)
- Tom Petty and the Heartbreakers' 40th Anniversary Tour (Tom Petty and the Heartbreakers; three dates) (2017)
- An Evening With the Eagles (Eagles; two dates) (2018)

== See also ==
- List of artists who reached number one on the U.S. country chart
- List of country rock musicians
- List of country music performers
- List of southern rock bands
