= Michael (soundtrack) =

Michael: Songs from the Motion Picture

Soundtrack album by Michael Jackson
- Released: April 24, 2026
- Recorded: 1969–1986
- Length: 57:55
- Labels: Epic; Legacy; MJJ
- Producers: Michael Jackson; Bobby Taylor; The Corporation; The Jacksons; Quincy Jones

Michael Jackson chronology
Thriller 40 (2022)	Michael: Songs from the Motion Picture (2026)

Michael: Songs from the Motion Picture is the soundtrack album to the biographical film Michael, based on the life and career of Michael Jackson, released on April 24, 2026, the same day as the film's premiere.

The album features 13 songs performed by Jackson that are showcased in the film, spanning his early career with the Jackson 5 and the Jacksons, as well as selections from his solo recordings, including material from the albums Off the Wall and Thriller. The soundtrack features many of Jackson's hits like "Wanna Be Startin' Somethin'", "Billie Jean", "Thriller", and "Don't Stop 'Til You Get Enough".

It is the thirteenth release by Sony and/or Motown since Jackson's death.

== Track listing ==
Michael: Songs from the Motion Picture track listing
No.	Title	Writer(s)	Original album	Length
1.	"I'll Be There"	The Corporation (Berry Gordy, Alphonso Mizell, Freddie Perren and Deke Richards)	Third Album (1970)	3:58
2.	"Never Can Say Goodbye"	Clifton Davis	Maybe Tomorrow (1971)	3:01
3.	"Who's Loving You"	Smokey Robinson	Diana Ross Presents The Jackson 5 (1969)	4:02
4.	"Medley: I Want You Back / ABC / The Love You Save" (live)	The Corporation	The Jacksons Live! (1981)	3:00
5.	"Ben" (live)	Don Black; Walter Scharf	The Jacksons Live!	3:06
6.	"Don't Stop 'Til You Get Enough"	Michael Jackson	Off the Wall (1979)	6:06
7.	"Beat It"	Jackson	Thriller (1982)	3:47
8.	"Thriller"	Rod Temperton	Thriller	5:58
9.	"Billie Jean"	Jackson	Thriller	4:54
10.	"Wanna Be Startin' Somethin'"	Jackson	Thriller	6:03
11.	"Human Nature"	Steve Porcaro; John Bettis	Thriller	4:07
12.	"Workin' Day and Night"	Jackson	Off the Wall	5:13
13.	"Bad"	Jackson	Bad (1987)	4:08
Total length:				57:55

== Other songs ==
Songs not included in the soundtrack, but are featured in the movie, include the following:

- "I Can't Help It", "Rockin' Robin", "We've Got a Good Thing Going", "Doggin' Around", and "Billie Jean (Pepsi Commercial)" by Michael Jackson
- "Big Boy", "You've Changed", "Stand!", "I Want You Back", and "ABC" by the Jackson 5
- "Dreamer", "Enjoy Yourself", "Blame it on the Boogie", "Think Happy", "I'll Be There" (live), and "This Place Hotel" (live) by the Jacksons
- "Oh How Happy" by The Shades of Blue
- "I Heard It Through the Grapevine" by Gladys Knight & the Pips
- "Money (That's What I Want)" by Barrett Strong
- "Singin' in the Rain" by Gene Kelly
- "West Coast Poplock" by Ronnie Hudson and the Street People

== Charts ==
=== Weekly charts ===
Weekly chart performance for Michael: Songs from the Motion Picture
Chart (2026)	Peak position
Australian Albums (ARIA)	17
Austrian Albums (Ö3 Austria)	6
Belgian Albums (Ultratop Flanders)	9
Belgian Albums (Ultratop Wallonia)	1
Canadian Albums (Billboard)	4
Croatian International Albums (HDU)	29
Dutch Albums (Album Top 100)	31
French Albums (SNEP)	1
German Albums (Offizielle Top 100)	6
German Pop Albums (Offizielle Top 100)	3
Greek Albums (IFPI)	8
Hungarian Albums (MAHASZ)	22
Irish Albums (Official Charts)	3
Italian Albums (FIMI)	5
Japanese Albums (Oricon)	8
Japanese Combined Albums (Oricon)	8
Japanese Hot Albums (Billboard Japan)	23
New Zealand Albums (RMNZ)	1
Polish Albums (ZPAV)	9
Portuguese Albums (AFP)	43
Scottish Albums (Official Charts)	6
Spanish Albums (Promusicae)	13
Swedish Physical Albums (Sverigetopplistan)	17
Swiss Albums (Schweizer Hitparade)	7
UK Albums (Official Charts)	4
UK Soundtrack Albums (Official Charts)	1
US Billboard 200	37
US Soundtrack Albums (Billboard)	2

=== Monthly charts ===
Monthly chart performance for Michael: Songs from the Motion Picture
Chart (2026)	Position
Japanese Albums (Oricon)	48

== Certifications and sales ==
Region	Certification	Certified units/sales
France	—	30,000
Italy (FIMI)	Gold	25,000^{‡}
New Zealand (RMNZ)	Gold	7,500^{‡}
^{‡} Sales+streaming figures based on certification alone.
