= Red Rum Club =

British rock band

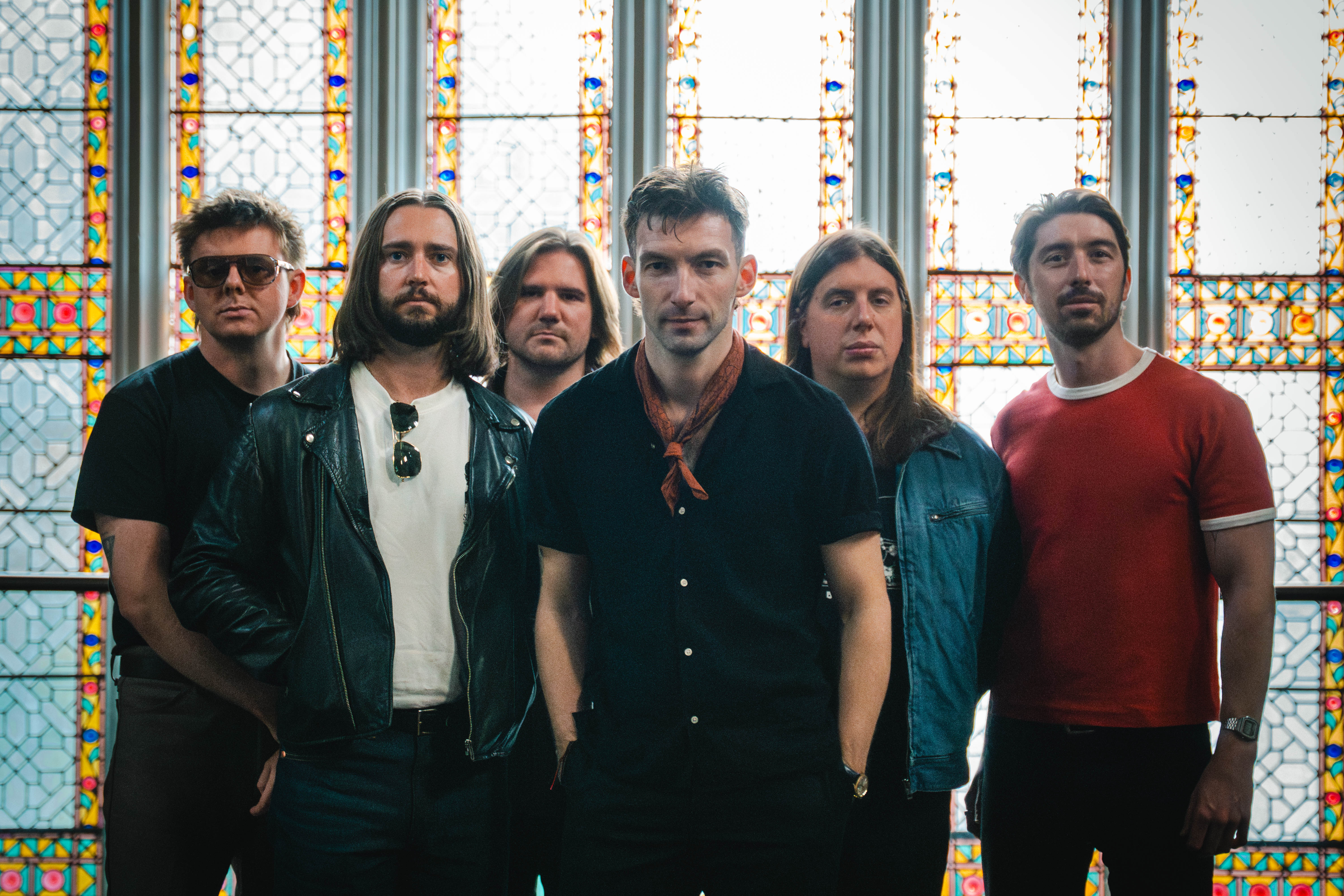
- Red Rum Club in 2025, left to right: Tom Williams, Neil Lawson, Michael McDermott, Fran Doran, former member Joe Corby, and Simon Hepworth

Background information
- Origin: Crosby, Merseyside, UK
- Genres: Alternative rock; indie rock; indie pop; americana
- Years active: 2014–present
- Label: Modern Sky
- Members: Fran Doran; Simon Hepworth; Neil Lawson; Michael McDermott; Tom Williams; Eli Younger
- Past members: Joe "the Blow" Corby
- Website: redrumclub.com

Red Rum Club are a British alternative rock band from Merseyside composed of Fran Doran (vocals), Tom Williams (guitar and backing vocals), Michael McDermott (guitar and backing vocals), Simon Hepworth (bass guitar), Neil Lawson (drums) and Eli Younger (trumpet). Their debut album, Matador, reached Top 50 in the UK Album Sales Charts with tracks appearing across BBC Radio 1, Radio 2 and 6 Music. They have had two Top 10 albums in the UK, 2024's Western Approaches & 2025's Buck, charting at number 8 and number 7 respectively on the UK Albums Chart.

== History ==
=== 2014–2018: Formation ===
All six members originally played in separate bands before forming in 2014, with many of them never having met before sharing a rehearsal space. They quickly bonded musically, aided by their extracurricular activities, including weekly boxing sessions together.

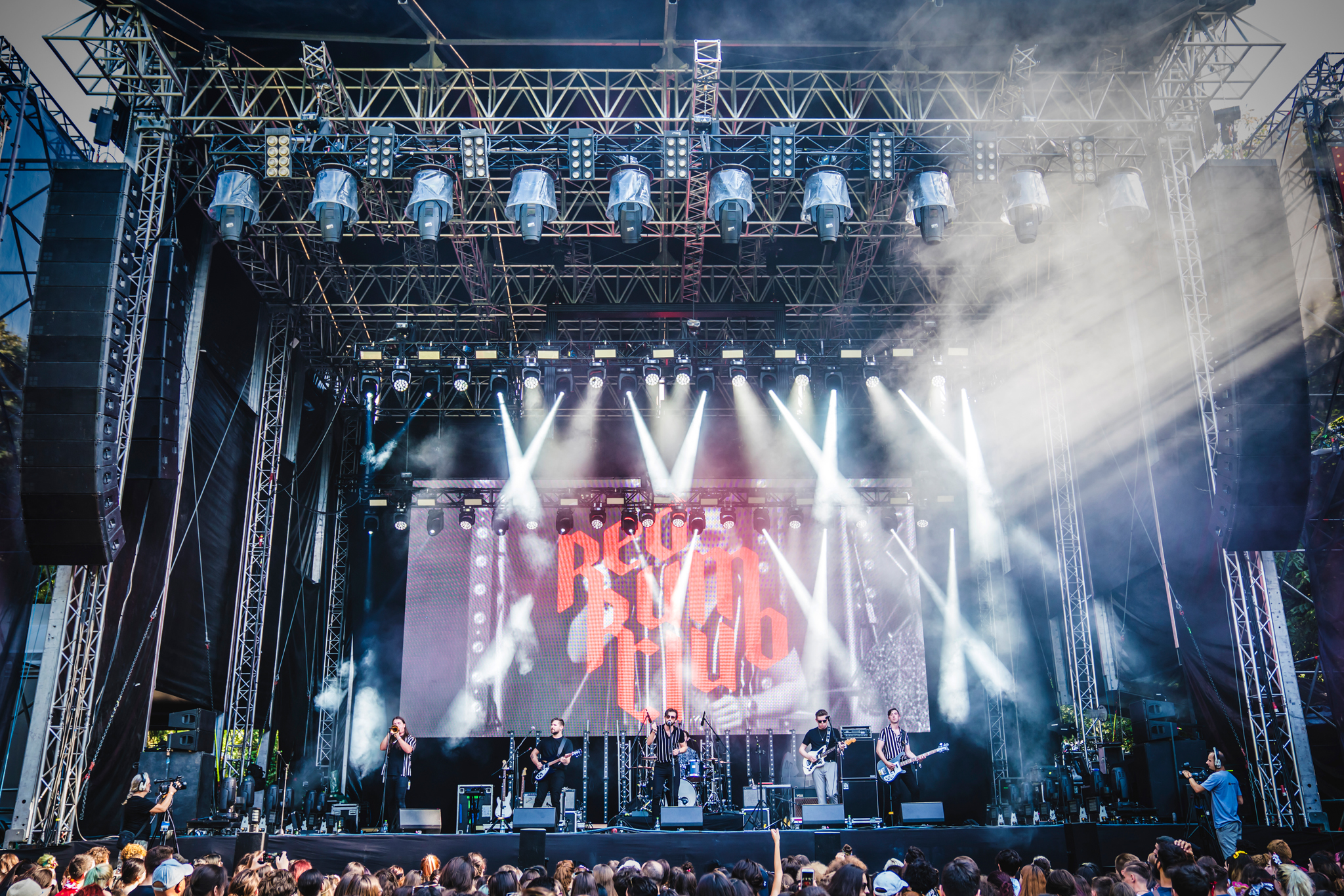
Red Rum Club live at Summer Well Festival 2019

=== 2019: Matador ===
Red Rum Club released their debut album Matador on 11 January 2019 on Modern Sky, which featured the song "Would You Rather Be Lonely". That summer they played slots at various festivals in the UK including Glastonbury Festival, Isle of Wight Festival and Kendal Calling, as well as concerts in Romania, South Korea and Sweden.

=== 2020: The Hollow of Humdrum ===
On 2 October 2020, the band released their second studio album The Hollow of Humdrum, which was preceded by the single "Kids Addicted", "Eleanor", "Ballerino" and "The Elevation". This was their first release to chart on the UK Albums Chart, peaking at number 58.

=== 2021-2023: How to Steal the World ===
On 22 October 2021, the band released their third studio album How To Steal The World, which was the band's first Top 40 album, peaking at number 34 on the UK Album Charts.

=== 2024: Western Approaches ===
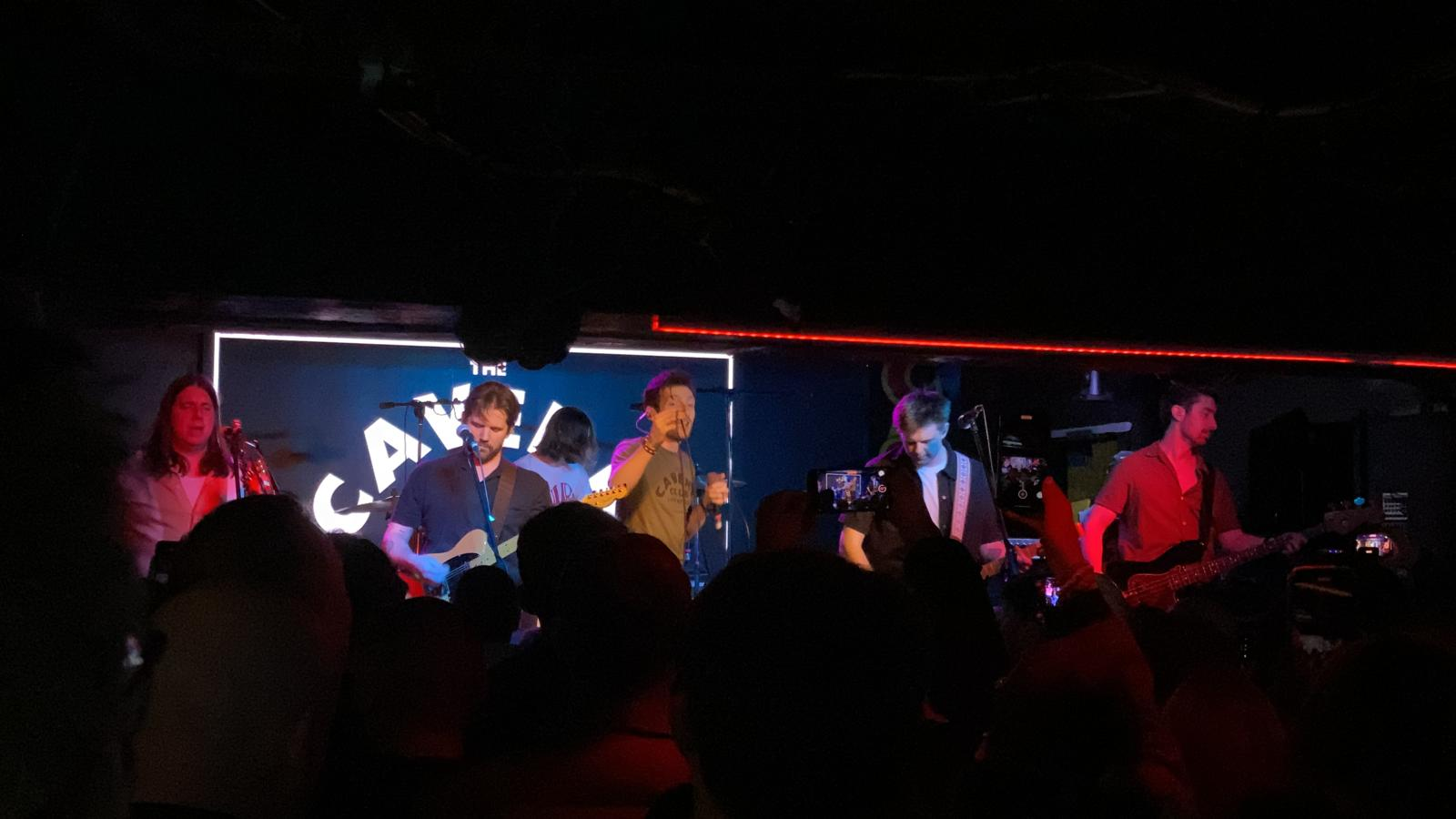
Red Rum Club playing in The Cavern Club, Liverpool

On 23 February 2024, the band released their fourth studio album Western Approaches, which was their first Top 10 album in the UK, charting at number 8. This was followed by their biggest ever headline show at the M&S Bank Arena in Liverpool. The band also played a headline slot at Sound City.

The band supported Blossoms on the majority of dates on their 2024 UK Tour. In 2025, they supported The Wombats on their tours in the UK, Europe, and the United States, alongside playing festivals such as Glastonbury Festival and Reading and Leeds Festival.

=== 2025–present: Buck ===
On 5 September 2025, the band released their fifth studio album Buck, which became their highest charting album to date, peaking at number 7 in the UK Album Chart.

On 27 October 2025, Red Rum Club announced their biggest ever outdoor headline show at the Pier Head in Liverpool, which took place on 19 June 2026.

On 27 April 2026, one day before their 2026 US Tour was due to start, it was announced that Corby would be departing the band.

== Musical style ==
Red Rum Club's sound has been described as bass-driven "Mariachi Merseybeat" due to the presence of a trumpet on their songs. They have been compared to fellow scouse bands such as The Zutons.

Red Rum Club have stated that Bootle – and its seafaring, industrial heritage – plays a big role in their sound. Their frequent tours of the United States also influence their musical style.

== Band members ==
=== Current members ===
- Fran Doran – lead vocals, occasional guitar (2016–present)
- Simon Hepworth – bass (2016–present)
- Neil Lawson – drums (2016–Present)
- Michael McDermott – guitar, backing vocals (2016–present)
- Tom Williams – guitar, backing vocals (2016–present)
- Eli Younger – trumpet (2026–present, touring member 2026)

=== Former Members ===
- Joe "the Blow" Corby – trumpet, (2016–2026)

== Discography ==
=== Studio albums ===
List of studio albums, with selected details and chart positions
Title	Details	Peak chart positions		
Title	Details	UK	UK Indie	SCO
Matador	Released: 11 January 2019; Label: Modern Sky; Formats: Digital Download, CD, 12" Vinyl, Streaming	–	5	56
The Hollow of Humdrum	Released: 2 October 2020; Label: Modern Sky; Formats: Digital Download, CD, 12" Vinyl, Streaming	58	10	37
How To Steal The World	Released: 12 November 2021; Label: Modern Sky; Formats: Digital Download, CD, 12" Vinyl, Streaming	34	5	34
Western Approaches	Released: 23 February 2024; Label: Modern Sky; Formats: Digital Download, CD, 12" Vinyl, Streaming	8	–	6
Buck	Released: 5 September 2026; Label: Modern Sky; Formats: Digital Download, CD, 12" Vinyl, Streaming	7	2	7

=== Singles ===
Title	Year	Album
"Alone Together"	2016	Non-album single
"Calexico"	2018	Matador
"Honey"	2018	Matador
"Would You Rather Be Lonely?"	2018	Matador
"Angeline"	2018	Matador
"Matador"	2019	Matador
"Kids Addicted"	2019	The Hollow of Humdrum
"Eleanor"	2020	The Hollow of Humdrum
"Ballerino"	2020	The Hollow of Humdrum
"The Elevation"	2020	The Hollow of Humdrum
"Last Christmas"	2020	Non-album single
"Nightcalling"	2021	How To Steal The World
"Vibrate"	2021	How To Steal The World
"Love Me Like You Wanna Be Loved"	2021	How To Steal The World
"Drown"	2021	How To Steal The World
"Vanilla"	2022	Non-album single
"The River"	2022	Non-album single
"Black Cat"	2023	Western Approaches
"Undertaker"	2023	Western Approaches
"Godless"	2023	Western Approaches
"Hole In My Home"	2024	Western Approaches
"American Nights & English Mornings"	2025	Buck
"Crush, TX"	2025	Buck
"Buck"	2025	Buck
"Wild"	2025	Buck
"Any Minute Now"	2026	TBC
