= Is This What You've Been Waiting For? =

Studio album by Amy Macdonald
- Released: 11 July 2025
- Recorded: 2024–2025
- Length: 36:37
- Label: BMG; Infectious
- Producer: Jim Abbiss; Nicolas Rebscher

Amy Macdonald chronology
| The Human Demands (2020) | Is This What You've Been Waiting For? (2025) |

Singles from Is This What You've Been Waiting For?
- 1. "Is This What You've Been Waiting For?" Released: 24 April 2025; 2. "Forward" Released: 16 May 2025; 3. "Can You Hear Me?" Released: 18 June 2025

Is This What You've Been Waiting For? is the sixth studio album by Scottish singer Amy Macdonald, released on 11 July 2025 via BMG and Infectious Records. The title track was released as the albums lead single in late April 2025, and received its debut airplay on BBC Radio 2 on 24 April 2025 to positive reviews. Released to favourable critical reviews, the album performed strongly commercially, debuting at number one on the albums charts in her native Scotland, being awarded Best Album at the 2025 Scottish Music Awards. Elsewhere, it debuted within the top ten in Austria, Belgium, Germany and the United Kingdom.

== Background ==
Following the release of her fifth studio album, The Human Demands (2020), Macdonald blamed the rise of streaming music as a contributing factor in her facing difficulties in having "people listen to the album". She subsequently took a break from recording new music for roughly four years. On 5 October 2024, Macdonald posted on her official Instagram that she was about the beginning recording what would become her sixth studio album. During the recording sessions, Macdonald sporadically uploaded a number of daily vlogs documenting her progress on the album in both London and Germany.

In April 2025, she released the lead single from the album, titled "Is This What You've Been Waiting For?", and later revealed that the album would also be titled Is This What You've Been Waiting For?. In an interview, she revealed that the single was written in response to the rise in music demand as a result of streaming services, saying that fans seem to "demand new music more often" as a result, and that the song was "my view on how people always expect more music and social media content". She further claimed she took inspiration from the opening of The Sphere in Las Vegas, saying that she "woke up one day and saw all of these videos of it, and I thought, this is incredible", before adding "really inspired me and made me think about how music is for me, and gigs have always been the most important part".

The single was said to "blend emotional depth with an urgent sense of forward motion", but having "connection and care". Music Talkers said that the song "is a reflection of where Amy is now – confident in her craft, rooted in gratitude, and still playing to sold-out crowds". It received its debut radio play on the Scott Mills breakfast show on BBC Radio 2. Afterwards, Macdonald said that, despite having been recording and releasing music "for eighteen years", hearing her songs on the radio "will never feel normal".

== Recording ==
The album was recorded between late 2024 and early 2025 in recording studios in both London, England and Munich, Germany, as suggested through Macdonald's Instagram daily vlog posts. Its title track was produced by Nicolas Rebscher, with Grammy Award winning producer Jim Abbiss, with whom Macdonald has previously collaborated with, also serving as producer on seven tracks.

== Release ==
The album was released on 11 July 2025 through a collaborative effort by both BMG and Infectious Music. To promote the release of both the lead single and album, on 25 April 2025, Macdonald performed a "surprise" free pop up gig at Prince's Square in her home city of Glasgow. She said that the gig "was the most random thing I think I’ve ever done", but "ended up really good". In April 2025, she confirmed an upcoming tour to support the release of the album. The tour officially commences on 24 May 2025, with the first performance taking place in Warrington at the Neighbourhood Weekender Festival, and will run until February 2026.

The albums lead single debuted at number 40 on the official UK Singles Downloads Chart on 2 May 2025. It subsequently debuted at number 41 on the official UK Singles Sales Chart on the same day.

== Track listing ==
Is This What You've Been Waiting For? track listing
| No. | Title | Writer(s) | Producer(s) | Length |
|---|---|---|---|---|
| 1. | "Is This What You’ve Been Waiting For?" | Amy Macdonald; James Arter; Adam Falkner | Nicolas Rebscher; Arter^{[a]}; Falkner^{[a]} | 3:34 |
| 2. | "Trapped" | Macdonald; Thom Kirkpatrick | Jim Abbiss | 3:49 |
| 3. | "Can You Hear Me?" | Macdonald; Matt Jones | Rebscher; Jones^{[a]} | 3:57 |
| 4. | "I’m Done (Games That You Play)" | Macdonald; Rebscher | Rebscher | 3:03 |
| 5. | "The Hope" | Macdonald; Arter; Falkner | Abbiss; Arter^{[a]}; Falkner^{[a]} | 3:33 |
| 6. | "Forward" | Macdonald; Kirkpatrick | Abbiss | 3:43 |
| 7. | "We Survive" | Macdonald | Abbiss | 3:35 |
| 8. | "One More Shot" | Macdonald; Arter; Falkner | Abbiss | 3:34 |
| 9. | "Physical" | Macdonald; Kirkpatrick | Abbiss | 3:46 |
| 10. | "It’s All So Long Ago" | Macdonald; Arter; Kyle Burns; Falkner | Abbiss | 4:03 |
| Total length: | | | | 36:37 |

=== Note ===
- ^{^[a]} signifies an additional producer

== Personnel ==
Credits adapted from Tidal.

=== Musicians ===
- Amy Macdonald – lead vocals (all tracks), backing vocals (tracks 2, 8)
- Adam Falkner – drums, percussion (all tracks); backing vocals (2, 3); acoustic guitar, organ (5)
- Nicolas Rebscher – backing vocals, bass, guitar, keyboards (1, 3, 4); percussion (4)
- James Arter – keyboards (1, 8, 10), guitar (1); electric guitar, piano, synthesizer (5)
- Thom Kirkpatrick – acoustic guitar (2, 5–7, 9), bass (2, 5, 6, 8, 10), keyboards (2, 7), backing vocals (2), synthesizer (6, 9), piano (9)
- Harry Koisser – 12-string guitar, backing vocals, kalimba (2); guitar (5, 6, 10), percussion (5), synthesizer (7); keyboards, Omnichord (8)
- Neill MacColl – guitar (2, 6, 8, 10), electric guitar (5); acoustic guitar, Guitaret, mandolin (7); slide guitar (8), lead guitar (9)
- Henry Bowers-Broadbent – synthesizer (2, 5, 6, 8, 10), piano (2, 5, 8), strings (7), bass synthesizer (9)
- Jim Abbiss – programming (2, 6–10)
- Holly Macey – backing vocals (2)
- Matt Jones – electric guitar, keyboards (3)
- Marcus Locock – Mellotron (5)
- Chris Hill – bass (7)
- Ben Lyonsmyth – rhythm guitar (8)

=== Technical ===
- Guy Massey – mixing, mastering
- George Chung – engineering (1, 3, 4, 7)
- Nicolas Rebscher – engineering (1, 3, 4)
- Marcus Locock – engineering (2, 5, 6, 8–10)
- Harry Koisser – engineering (7)

== Charts ==
Chart performance for Is This What You've Been Waiting For?
| Chart (2025) | Peak position |
|---|---|
| Austrian Albums (Ö3 Austria) | 3 |
| Belgian Albums (Ultratop Flanders) | 17 |
| Belgian Albums (Ultratop Wallonia) | 50 |
| Dutch Albums (Album Top 100) | 56 |
| German Albums (Offizielle Top 100) | 4 |
| Scottish Albums (Official Charts) | 1 |
| Swedish Physical Albums (Sverigetopplistan) | 9 |
| Swiss Albums (Schweizer Hitparade) | 3 |
| UK Albums (Official Charts) | 8 |
| UK Independent Albums (Official Charts) | 2 |
