= Western Approaches (Red Rum Club album) =

Studio album by Red Rum Club
- Released: 23 February 2024
- Genre: Alternative rock; indie rock; Americana
- Length: 31:40
- Label: Modern Sky UK
- Producer: Richard Turvey

Red Rum Club chronology
How To Steal The World (2021)	Western Approaches (2024)	Buck (2025)

Singles from Western Approaches
- 1. "Black Cat" Released: 17 August 2023; 2. "Undertaker" Released: 20 September 2023; 3. "Godless" Released: 19 October 2023; 4. "Hole in My Home" Released: 25 January 2024

Western Approaches is the fourth studio album by English band Red Rum Club. The album was released on 23 February 2024 through Modern Sky.

The album debuted at number 8 in the UK Albums Chart, making it their first top 10 album in the UK.

== Track listing ==
All tracks are written by Fran Doran, Tom Williams, Michael McDermott, Joe Corby, Simon Hepworth, & Neil Lawson.

No.	Title	Length
1.	"Western Approaches"	0:36
2.	"Godless"	3:19
3.	"Black Cat"	2:20
4.	"Afternoon"	2:05
5.	"Undertaker"	3:00
6.	"Hole In My Home"	3:32
7.	"Last Minute"	2:50
8.	"Houdini"	3:33
9.	"Daisy"	3:13
10.	"Alive"	2:50
11.	"Jigsaw Shores"	4:18
Total length:		31:40

== Charts ==
Chart performance
Chart (2025)	Peak position
Scottish Albums (OCC)	6
UK Albums (OCC)	8
