= Restoration (Røry album) =

Studio album by Røry
- Released: 31 January 2025
- Length: 28:24
- Label: Sadcøre
- Producer: Kingdoms

Røry chronology
Family Drama (2023)	Restoration (2025)	Bloodletting (2026)

Singles from Restoration
- 1. "Blossom" Released: 28 June 2024; 2. "Morality Suicide" Released: 31 July 2024; 3. "In the Bible" Released: 21 August 2024; 4. "Sorry I'm Late" Released: 4 October 2024; 5. "One Drink Away" Released: 29 November 2024

Restoration is the debut studio album by the English singer and songwriter Røry. It was released on 31 January 2025 via Sadcøre and follows her 2023 extended play Family Drama.

== Critical reception ==
Professional ratings
Review scores
Source	Rating
Distorted Sound	9/10
Kerrang!	4/5 stars

Rachel Roberts of Kerrang! awarded the album 4 out of 5 stars and highlighted Røry's "mix of guitars and vocals brushed with Kate Bush-esque yodels with rap with trap beats". Roberts noted the album as "an especially poignant listen for anyone who has found themselves stuck in destructive cycles, but has worked on breaking them". Ed Walton of Distorted Sound rated the 9/10, calling the album "a tour de force of defiance, maturity, vulnerability, and triumph, making it easily one of the best releases of 2025 so far".

== Track listing ==
All tracks are written by Røry, Dominic Liu, and Sean McDonagh, with additional writers noted.

Restoration track listing
No.	Title	Writer(s)	Length
1.	"If Pain Could Talk, What Would It Say?"		2:10
2.	"In the Bible"		3:08
3.	"Wolves"	Jordan Shaw	2:57
4.	"Hold On" (featuring Roxanne Emery)	Joshua Keogh	2:38
5.	"Blossom"		2:54
6.	"Sherlock Holmes"		3:12
7.	"One Drink Away"	Shaw	2:12
8.	"Morality Suicide"	Shaw	2:41
9.	"Sorry I'm Late"		3:15
10.	"The Atheist"	Shaw	3:14
Total length:			28:24

== Personnel ==
- Røry – vocals
- Kingdoms – production
- Dan Weller – mixing, additional production, programming, drum programming, guitars, synthesizers
- Kevin Peterson – mastering
- John Taylor – photography

== Charts ==
Chart (2025)	Peak position
Scottish Albums (Official Charts)	2
UK Albums (Official Charts)	10
UK Independent Albums (Official Charts)	1
