= Roxanne Emery =

English musician

Rox Pink
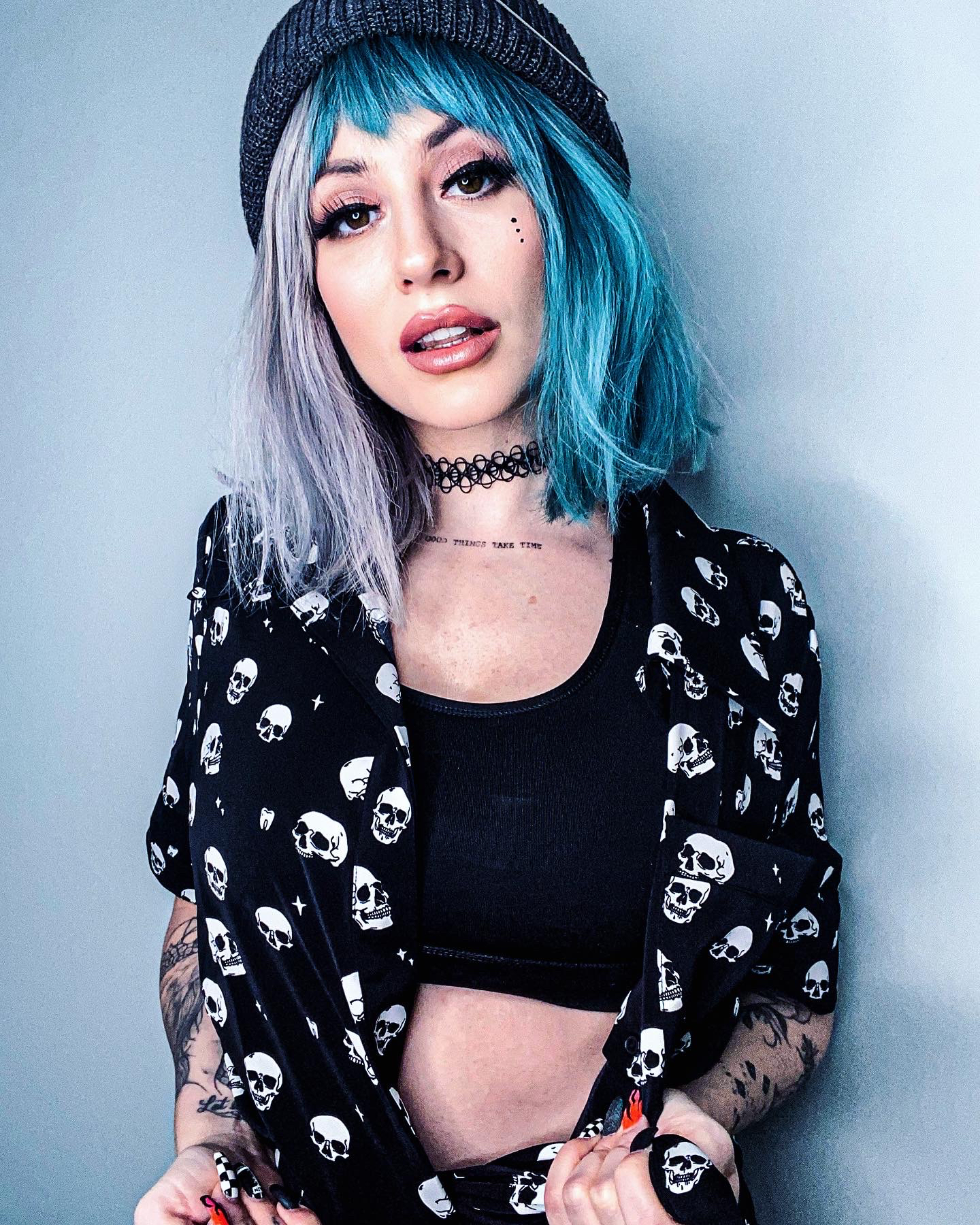
- Pink in 2021

Background information
- Also known as: RØRY
- Born: 4 October 1984 (age 42)
- Origin: Southampton, England
- Genres: Acoustic; dance; pop rock; hard rock; alternative rock; power pop; pop-punk; indie rock; sadcore
- Instruments: Vocals; guitar; piano
- Label: LATE
- Spouse: Rich Pink (m. 2026)
- Website: its-rory.com

Roxanne Emery (born on 4 October 1984), also known as Rox Pink and by her stage name RØRY, is an English singer-songwriter, producer, and social media personality.

== Music career ==
On 6 June 2011, Emery released her debut EP titled An Introduction to Roxanne Emery on LATE Records. It charted at number 54 on iTunes. 3 months later, on 6 September 2011, an acoustic recording of her original song "LATE" was uploaded to YouTube. Within hours the video went viral, and became the No. 1 – Top Favorited and Rated video in the UK, and No. 3 Top Favorited globally. In December 2011, her YouTube success continued when she uploaded her performance of Enrique Iglesias' "Hero" at The Royal Festival Hall, the video received over 100,000 hits in its first week.

On 15 April 2012, Emery released her second EP, entitled Turn Back, on LATE Records. It charted at number 17 on the iTunes chart. On 2 August 2012, Emery released her third EP entitled Live in London on LATE Records, which features live performances London's Hammersmith Apollo. The EP charted in the Top 10 iTunes singer-songwriter chart and Top 20 overall.

On 5 November 2014, Emery released her album For Weddings and a Funeral.

== Touring ==
Emery played eight dates on the "Northern Lights" world tour in 2011 with her brother. Venues included The House of Blues (Chicago), Music Box (LA), and Space (Ibiza).

In November 2011, Emery went on a 19 date tour of the UK supporting Joe McElderry, which included playing at The Royal Festival Hall, London. Following public reaction to her performances, she was then invited to support Matt Cardle on his 23-date UK tour in March 2012, which included dates at Dublin Olympia, Birmingham Symphony Hall and London's Hammersmith Apollo. On 17 April 2012, Emery performed at Hoxton Hall for her début headline show. When tickets went on sale, the show sold out within 40 minutes. On 26 October 2012, Emery performed at London's Bush Hall for her second headline. Again, the show sold out within hours. In June 2024, Emery performed at Liquid Death presents Download Festival 21 on the Avalanche Stage hosted by Kerrang! Radio.

== Music used on television ==
Her music has been featured in episodes of several popular television shows, including Cougar Town, Awkward, and Keeping Up with the Kardashians. "All That I Am" was chosen to feature as the closing track in the season finale of MTV's hit show Awkward which aired in the US September 2011.

"Real" was used in Channel 4's Hollyoaks in November 2011. "Turn Back" was featured in MTV's hit show, The Real World, which aired in the US in December 2011.

"Just Add Love" was featured in MTV's I Used To Be Fat in January 2012. "Don't" was featured in E! Entertainment's Kim's Fairytale Wedding in August 2012. "Tug of War" was featured in ABC's hit show Cougar Town. The episode aired on 15 January 2013.

"Walk Through Fire" from her second EP was featured on the soundtrack to an indie film released in 2013.

== Dance music ==
She is the sister of international DJ and producer Gareth Emery. Her vocals feature on the club anthem "A Day That Fades" by dance act Cosmic Gate. The track received support from Judge Jules and was played on Radio 1. The track also received support and radio play from Armin van Buuren as well as being included on Ministry of Sound's Ibiza Annual. Emery also co-wrote a track with and featured on brother Gareth Emery's début artist album, Northern Lights, which charted at Number 1 on the US iTunes Dance Chart. Another collaboration is with Luke Bond for the track "On Fire"; it was premièred by Gareth Emery at Governor's Island and was released in early 2014. In 2014, she again collaborated with Gareth Emery on the song "Soldier", on the album Drive.

In December 2014, Emery collaborated with the star DJ Dash Berlin, and the result was called "Shelter"; in the beginning of 2015, Emery teamed up with trance trio Easton and released the track "Healing Rain". The Bryan Kearney remix of this single reached the Beatport Nr. 1 trance chart and got featured on Armin van Buuren mix-compilation A State of Trance Yearmix 2015.

Emery has since then worked on tracks with other DJs/producers.

In 2018, Emery brought up a new trance act "HØLY WATERS" together with Ciaran McAuley. On 17 August 2018, HØLY WATERS released their first single "Amsterdam".

In December 2018, Emery was present two times in the A State of Trance 2018 Top 50 Special, with "MaRLo & Roxanne Emery: A Thousand Seas" at number 48 and "Craig Connelly feat. Roxanne Emery: This Life" at number 17. Both tracks were used in Armin van Buuren's A State of Trance Year Mix 2018

== Songwriting ==
Emery co-wrote "Post Malone" for DJ Sam Feldt featuring Rani, which went platinum in the United Kingdom, Australia and Canada. The track has totalled 400 million streams.

Other writing credits include the BBC Radio 1 A-listed "Feel My Needs" by Weiss, Alison Wonderland's "Peace" and JAUZ + Karra's "Wildlife". Her releases have amassed over half a billion streams to date.

== RØRY ==
Since 2019, Emery has been writing and producing material under the name RØRY, writing and collaborating with producers such as K-391, Trivecta, Möwe, MitiS, Jason Ross, John de Sohn, Slander and William Black.

In her podcast she admits to husband Rich that RØRY is an alter-ego she has used on stage to overcome ADHD anxiety and burnout.

== Personal life ==
Emery grew up in Southampton, England. She lost her mother to cancer when she was 22 years old. Her record label, LATE Records, is named after her mother, Linda Angela Teresa Emery.

She is the younger sibling of EDM producer and DJ Gareth Emery.

She and husband Rich Pink run the ADHD Love website, and related TikTok and YouTube channels focusing on living with ADHD. In their podcast Late Bloomers they chat about their experiences with neurodivergence and being diagnosed as adults.

They have self-published four books on the subject:

- Dirty Laundry, published in January 2023,, published by
- Small Talk, published in June 2024.,
- Ady and Me with illustrator Sara Rhys, a childrens book about ADHD, and
- The Cherry Tree Theory that doubles as a biographical account of Rox and Rich's lives with advice to overcome issues experienced by neurodivergent people.

Emery uses both she/her and they/them pronouns.

== Discography ==
=== Albums ===
- For Weddings & A Funeral (2014)
- Restoration (2025)
- Bloodletting (2026)

=== EPs ===
- An Introduction To Roxanne Emery (2011)
- Turn Back (2012)
- Live in London (2012)
- Good Die Young (2022) (as RØRY)
- Family Drama (2023) (as RØRY)

=== Singles (as lead artist) ===
- "f*ck fame" (2021)
- "Psychological War" (2021)
- "My Chemical Romance" (2021)
- "Uncomplicated" (2021)
- "Kill the Girl" (2022)
- "My Funeral Song" with Loveless (2022)
- "Baby Vendetta" (2022)
- "Family Tree" (2022)
- "December Hurts" (2022)
- "Alternative" (2023)
- "Hurt Myself" (2023)
- "The Apology I'll Never Receive" (2023)
- "Black Hearse" (2023)
- "Anti-Repressant" (2023)
- "Blossom" (2024)
- "Morality $uicide" (2024)
- "In the Bible" (2024)
- "Sorry I'm Late" (2024)
- "One Drink Away" (2024)
- "If Pain Could Talk, What Would It Say?" (2025)
- "Wolves" (2025)
- "Degradation" (August 29, 2025)
- "Dead Girl Walking" (2025)
- "Kids These Days" (2026)
- "Strange" (2026)

=== Singles (as featured artist) ===
- "Shelter" – Dash Berlin featuring Roxanne Emery (2014)
- "Safe in the Sky" – Lee Osborne featuring Roxanne Emery (2014)
- "On Fire" – Luke Bond featuring Roxanne Emery (2014)
- "Summer Air" – Lema and Shafer featuring Roxanne Emery (2015)
- "Shine" – Aly & Fila featuring Roxanne Emery [FSOE] (2015)
- "Where You Hide" – ReOrder and Lee Osborne with Roxanne Emery (2015)
- "Healing Rain" – Easton featuring Roxanne Emery (2015)
- "Nowhere to Be Found" – Fabio XB and Liuck featuring Roxanne Emery (2016)
- "Lullaby" – Roman Messer featuring Roxanne Emery [Suanda Music] (2017)
- "This Life" – Craig Connelly featuring Roxanne Emery [Who's Afraid Of 138?!] (2018)
- "A Thousand Seas" – MaRLo and Roxanne Emery (2018)
- "Neon Dreams" – Joel Hirsch and Roxanne Emery (2018)
- "Under the Light" – Chris Schweizer featuring Roxanne Emery [Who's Afraid Of 138?!] (2018)
- "Anything" – Alex Mattson feat. RØRY (2018)
- "Wannabe" – Jonasu feat. Roxanne Emery (uncredited) (2019)
- "Dancing in the Rain" – Futurecode and Roxanne Emery (2019)
- "Lost & Found" – Roman Messer and Roxanne Emery [Suanda Music] (2019)
- "if i ain't got u" – Möwe feat. RØRY (2019)
- "GOOD:BAD/CLOUD 9" – CAZETTE and RØRY (2019)
- "More Than Words" – Culture Code feat. RØRY (2019)
- "Riptide" – Trivecta & Amidy feat. RØRY (2019)
- "Built to Last" – Feki feat. RØRY [Lowly (CMG)] (2019)
- "Drown the Sky" – William Black feat. RØRY [Lowly (CMG)] (2019)
- "The Second Time Around" – Zedo and Roxanne Emery [Amsterdam Trance (2020)
- "Never Going Down" – Andrew Rayel and Roxanne Emery [InHarmony Music] (2020)
- "Learn to Fly" – Maratone and Roxanne Emery [Abora Recordings] (2020)
- "Calm the Storm" – Super8 & Tab featuring Roxanne Emery [Armind] (2020)
- "Gold Dust" – Markus Schulz featuring Roxanne Emery [Black Hole Recordings] (2020)
- "Our Song" – Morgan Page feat. Roxanne Emery (2020)
- "Say My Name (Tonight)" – Sevenn, Moonshine (2020)
- "Lighting the Bridge" – Dash Berlin featuring Roxanne Emery [BODYWRMR] (2020)
- "Sound of the Alarm" – BiXX feat. Roxanne Emery [Amsterdam Trance] (2020)
- "Just Like You" – John de Sohn feat. RØRY (2020)
- "Better Off Lonely" – Nurko feat. RØRY (2020)
- "Embers" – Adip Kiyoi & Roxanne Emery (2020)
- "Say My Name (Tonight)" – Sevenn & Moonshine (2020)
- "Aurora" – K-391 and RØRY (2020)
- "Gold" – W&W feat. RØRY (2020)
- "Try" – MitiS feat. RØRY (2021)
- "Ghost in the Machine" – Trivecta feat. RØRY (2021)
- "Wonderland" – Axel Johansson feat. RØRY (2021)
- "The Love Songs" – Love Harder and RØRY (2021)
- "Walk On Water (Love Is Gone Part II)" – SLANDER feat. RØRY and Dylan Matthew (2022)
- "Mortal" – Axel Johansson (2022)
- "Die Another Day" – Blind Channel and RØRY (2023)

== Bibliography ==
- Dirty Laundry: Why Adults with ADHD Are So Ashamed and What We Can Do to Help (2023) [co-authored with Rich Pink]
- Small Talk: 10 ADHD Lies and How to Stop Believing Them (2024) [co-authored with Rich Pink]
- Ady and Me (2025) [co-authored with Rich Pink and illustrated by Sara Rhys]
- The Cherry Tree Theory: A Simple Guide to Stop F*cking Up Your Life (2026) [co-authored with Rich Pink]
