= Chris Stapleton discography =

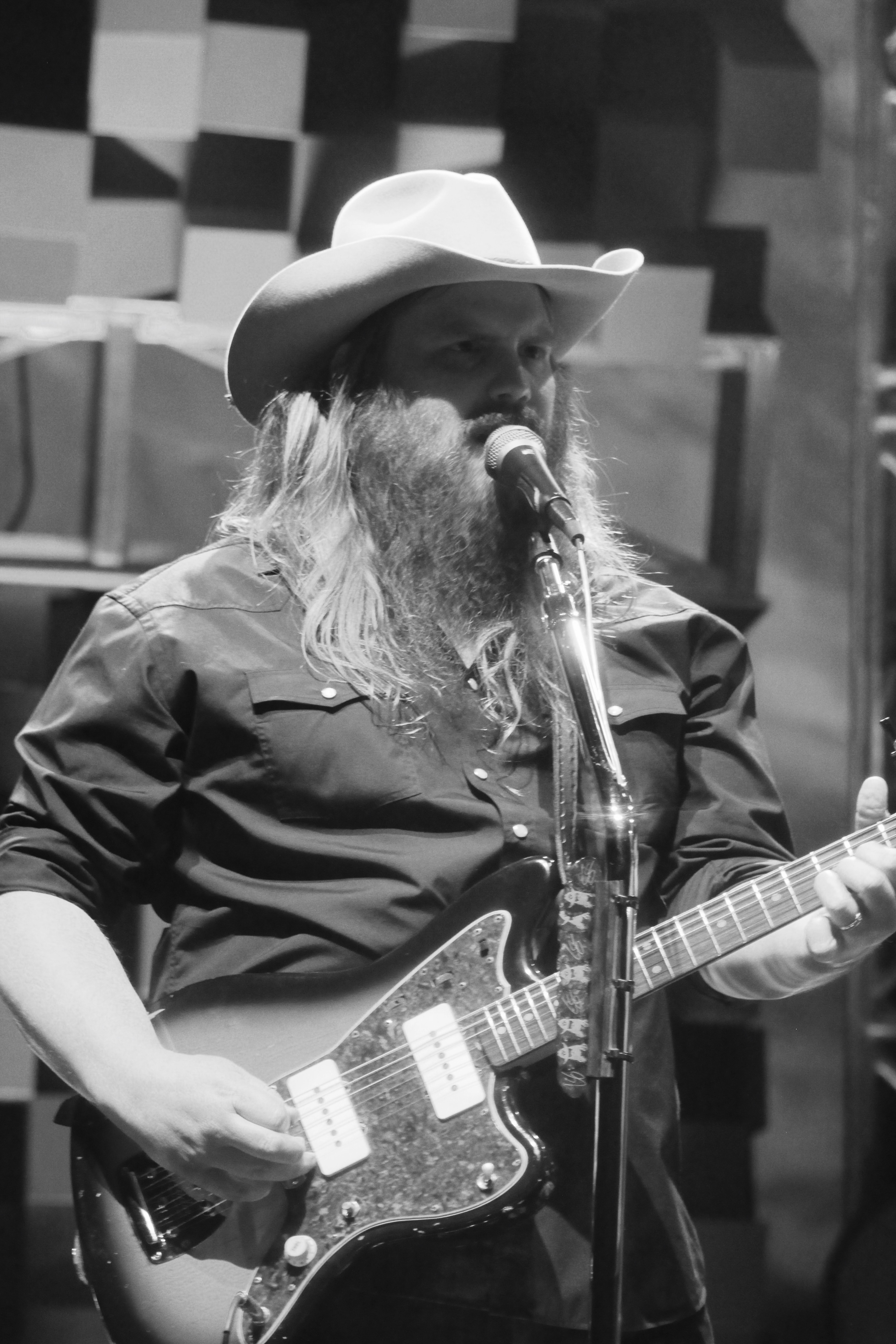
- Stapleton in 2017
- Studio albums: 5
- EPs: 1
- Singles: 21
- Music videos: 3
- Promotional singles: 8
- Other charted songs: 11
- #1 singles: 3

American singer-songwriter Chris Stapleton has released five studio albums, one EP, 21 singles, twelve promotional singles, and seven music videos. His debut solo album, Traveller, was released on May 5, 2015, by Mercury Nashville. It reached number one on the US Billboard 200 and was certified seven-times platinum by the Recording Industry Association of America (RIAA) and four-times platinum by Music Canada. Its album track "Tennessee Whiskey" became the first Country song to be certified double diamond in the US and reached the top 20 on the Billboard Hot 100, while the single "Nobody to Blame" reached the top 10 on the US Country Airplay chart. Stapleton's second studio album From A Room: Volume 1 was released on May 5, 2017, and Volume 2, on December 1. Traveller and Volume 1 were the best-selling country albums of 2016 and 2017, respectively. Volume 1 and Volume 2 both debuted at number two on the Billboard 200.

Traveller, From A Room: Volume 1, and Volume 2 held the top-three spots on the Top Country Albums chart dated February 10, 2018, making Stapleton the first artist to do so since Garth Brooks in 1992. "Broken Halos" became his first single to top the Country Airplay chart and was certified six-times platinum. This was followed-up by "Millionaire" that reached the chart's Top 5. His fourth studio album Starting Over was released on November 13, 2020 and debuted at number three on the US Billboard 200 selling 103,000 units in its first week. The title track and "You Should Probably Leave" both became number one hits and sold over six-million copies. Higher, his fifth studio album, was released on November 10, 2023 featuring his highest charting Billboard Hot 100 single as a solo artist "White Horse" peaking at No. 12.

== Studio albums ==
Title	Album details	Peak chart positions							Sales	Certifications
Title	Album details	US	US Country	AUS	CAN	GER	NZ	UK	Sales	Certifications
Traveller	Release date: May 5, 2015; Label: Mercury Nashville; Format: CD, digital download, LP	1	1	47	4	53	13	67	US: 2,598,600	RIAA: 7× Platinum; BPI: Gold; MC: 4× Platinum; RMNZ: 3× Platinum
From A Room: Volume 1	Release date: May 5, 2017; Label: Mercury Nashville; Format: CD, digital download, LP	2	1	20	1	—	32	22	US: 942,000 (Note: United States pure album sales figure for From A Room: Volume 1 as of October 2018.); CAN: 9,000	RIAA: 2× Platinum; MC: Platinum; RMNZ: Platinum
From A Room: Volume 2	Release date: December 1, 2017; Label: Mercury Nashville; Format: CD, digital download, LP	2	1	25	5	—	—	89	US: 541,200 (Note: United States pure album sales figure for From A Room: Volume 2 as of January 2019)	RIAA: Platinum; MC: Platinum; RMNZ: Gold
Starting Over	Released: November 13, 2020; Label: Mercury Nashville; Format: CD, digital download, LP, streaming	3	1	15	2	61	—	31		RIAA: 3× Platinum; MC: Platinum; RMNZ: 2× Platinum; BPI: Silver
Higher	Released: November 10, 2023; Label: Mercury Nashville; Format: CD, digital download, LP, streaming	3	1	13	2	25	4	22		RIAA: Gold; MC: Gold; RMNZ: Gold
"—" denotes releases that did not chart

== Extended plays ==
Title	Details
In Stereo	Release date: 2015 (Record Store Day limited edition); Label: Mercury Nashville; Format: LP

== Singles ==
=== As lead artist ===
Title	Year	Peak chart positions										Certifications	Album
Title	Year	US	US Country	US Country Airplay	US Main. Rock	US Triple A	AUS	CAN	CAN Country	CAN Rock	GER	Certifications	Album
"What Are You Listening To?"	2013	—	—	46	—	—	—	—	—	—	—	RIAA: Platinum; RMNZ: Gold	Non-album single
"Traveller"	2015	87	17	—	—	—	—	—	—	—	—	RIAA: 4× Platinum; ARIA: Gold; BPI: Silver; MC: Platinum; RMNZ: Platinum	Traveller
"Nobody to Blame"	2015	68	13	10	—	—	—	83	11	—	—	RIAA: 2× Platinum; MC: Platinum	Traveller
"Parachute"	2016	78	12	17	—	—	—	—	34	—	—	RIAA: 5× Platinum; ARIA: Platinum; BPI: Silver; MC: 3× Platinum; RMNZ: Platinum	Traveller
"Either Way"	2017	89	17	26	—	—	—	—	—	—	—	RIAA: Platinum; MC: Platinum	From A Room: Volume 1
"Broken Halos"	2017	45	5	1	—	—	—	67	3	—	—	RIAA: 7× Platinum; ARIA: Platinum; BPI: Silver; MC: 4× Platinum; RMNZ: 2× Platinum	From A Room: Volume 1
"Midnight Train to Memphis"	2017	—	43	—	26	36	—	—	—	—	—	RIAA: Gold; MC: Gold	From A Room: Volume 2
"Millionaire"	2018	47	4	2	—	—	—	84	6	—	—	RIAA: 3× Platinum; ARIA: Gold; BPI: Silver; MC: 2× Platinum; RMNZ: Platinum	From A Room: Volume 2
"Blow" (with Ed Sheeran and Bruno Mars)	2019	53	—	—	17	—	31	39	—	4	93	BPI: Silver; MC: Platinum; RMNZ: Gold	No.6 Collaborations Project
"Starting Over"	2020	25	1	2	—	—	—	21	3	—	—	RIAA: 7× Platinum; ARIA: Platinum; BPI: Silver; MC: 5× Platinum; RMNZ: 2× Platinum	Starting Over
"Cold"	2020	— (Note: "Cold" did not enter the Billboard Hot 100, but peaked at number one on the Bubbling Under Hot 100 Singles chart.)	22	—	—	7	—	—	—	—	—	RIAA: 2× Platinum; MC: Platinum; RMNZ: Platinum	Starting Over
"Arkansas"	2020	— (Note: "Arkansas" did not enter the Billboard Hot 100, but peaked at number 27 on the Digital Songs Sales chart.)	— (Note: "Arkansas" did not enter the Hot Country Songs chart, but peaked at number 12 on the Country Digital Songs Sales chart.)	—	38	—	—	—	—	—	—		Starting Over
"You Should Probably Leave"	2021	28	1	1	—	—	— (Note: "You Should Probably Leave" did not enter ARIA Singles Chart, but peaked at number 21 in The Music Network's Country Hot 50.)	35	1	—	—	RIAA: 8× Platinum; ARIA: Platinum; BPI: Platinum; MC: 4× Platinum; RMNZ: 5× Platinum	Starting Over
"Easy on Me" (Note: The duet version of "Easy on Me" is featured on Target and Japanese editions of 30.) (with Adele)	2021	—	—	25	—	—	—	—	—	—	—		30
"Joy of My Life"	2022	— (Note: "Joy of My Life" did not enter the Billboard Hot 100, but peaked at number one on the Bubbling Under Hot 100 Singles chart.)	27	25	—	—	—	—	43	—	—	RIAA: Platinum; MC: Platinum; RMNZ: Platinum	Starting Over
"White Horse"	2023	12	5	2	—	20	—	14	1	—	—	RIAA: 4× Platinum; BPI: Silver; RMNZ: 2× Platinum	Higher
"Think I'm in Love with You"	2024	49	12	12	—	—	—	67	25	—	—	RIAA: 2× Platinum; BPI: Silver; RMNZ: 2× Platinum	Higher
"A Song to Sing" (with Miranda Lambert)	2025	— (Note: "A Song to Sing" did not enter the Billboard Hot 100, but peaked at number eight on the Bubbling Under Hot 100 Singles chart.)	30	17	—	—	—	—	38	—	—		Crisco
"—" denotes releases that did not chart

=== As featured artist ===
Title	Year	Peak chart positions										Certifications	Album
Title	Year	US	US Country Airplay	US Triple A	AUS	CAN	GER	FRA	NZ	UK	WW	Certifications	Album
"Say Something" (Justin Timberlake featuring Chris Stapleton)	2018	9	—	—	18	6	11	69	20	9	—	RIAA: 3× Platinum; ARIA: 2× Platinum; BPI: Platinum; BVMI: Gold; MC: 2× Platinum; RMNZ: 2× Platinum	Man of the Woods
"Love Me Anyway" (Pink featuring Chris Stapleton)	2019	96	52	—	—	—	—	—	— (Note: "Love Me Anyway" did not enter NZ Top 40 chart, but peaked at number 24 in NZ Hot Singles chart.)	—	—	ARIA: Gold; MC: Gold; RMNZ: Gold	Hurts 2B Human
"Tell Me When It's Over" (Sheryl Crow featuring Chris Stapleton)	2019	—	—	38	—	—	—	—	—	—	—		Threads
"Joy" (Santana featuring Chris Stapleton)	2021	—	—	—	—	—	—	—	—	—	—		Blessings and Miracles
"I Bet You Think About Me" (Taylor Swift featuring Chris Stapleton)	2021	22	23	—	43	17	—	—	—	— (Note: "I Bet You Think About Me" did not enter the UK Singles Chart, but peaked at number 75 on the UK Streaming Chart.)	22	ARIA: Gold; RMNZ: Gold	Red (Taylor's Version)
"Sweet Symphony" (Joy Oladokun featuring Chris Stapleton)	2022	—	—	—	—	—	—	—	—	—	—	RIAA: Gold	Proof of Life
"We Don't Fight Anymore" (Carly Pearce featuring Chris Stapleton)	2023	67	9	—	—	—	—	—	—	—	—	RIAA: Platinum	Hummingbird
"—" denotes releases that did not chart

=== Promotional singles ===
Title	Year	Peak chart positions							Certifications	Album
Title	Year	US	US Country	US Country Airplay	US Holiday Digital	AUS	CAN	WW	Certifications	Album
"Tennessee Whiskey"	2015	20	1	57	—	62	39	175	RIAA: 2× Diamond; ARIA: 9× Platinum; BPI: 2× Platinum; MC: Diamond; RMNZ: 11× Platinum	Traveller
"Last Thing I Needed, First Thing This Morning"	2017	—	37	—	—	—	—	—	RIAA: Gold	From A Room: Volume 1
"Second One to Know"	2017	—	37	—	—	—	—	—	RIAA: Gold; MC: Gold	From A Room: Volume 1
"Scarecrow in the Garden"	2017	—	47	—	—	—	—	—	RIAA: Platinum; MC: Gold; RMNZ: Gold	From A Room: Volume 2
"Tryin' to Untangle My Mind"	2017	—	45	—	—	—	—	—		From A Room: Volume 2
"The Ballad of the Lonesome Cowboy"	2019	—	—	—	—	—	—	—		Toy Story 4
"Nothing Else Matters"	2021	— (Note: "Nothing Else Matters" did not enter the Billboard Hot 100, but peaked at number 34 on the Digital Songs Sales chart.)	—	—	—	—	—	—		The Metallica Blacklist
"Glow" (with Kelly Clarkson)	2021	—	—	—	41	—	—	—		When Christmas Comes Around...
"I'm a Ram"	2022	—	— (Note: "I'm a Ram" did not enter the Hot Country Songs chart, but peaked at number 21 on the Country Digital Songs Sales chart.)	—	—	—	—	—		Non-album promotional singles
"The Star-Spangled Banner (Live from Super Bowl LVII)"	2023	— (Note: "The Star-Spangled Banner (Live from Super Bowl LVII)" did not enter the Billboard Hot 100, but peaked at number 21 on the Digital Songs Sales chart.)	— (Note: "The Star-Spangled Banner (Live from Super Bowl LVII)" did not enter the Hot Country Songs chart, but peaked at number 6 on the Country Digital Songs Sales chart.)	—	—	—	—	—		Non-album promotional singles
"It Takes a Woman"	2023	— (Note: "It Takes a Woman" did not enter the Billboard Hot 100, but peaked at number 14 on the Bubbling Under Hot 100 Singles chart.)	34	—	—	—	—	—		Higher
"Bad as I Used to Be"	2025	—	—	—	—	—	93	—		F1 the Album
"—" denotes releases that did not chart

== Other charted and certified songs ==
Title	Year	Peak chart positions					Certifications	Album
Title	Year	US	US Country	US Country Digital	CAN	WW	Certifications	Album
"When the Stars Come Out"	2015	—	—	—	—	—	RIAA: Platinum; MC: Gold	In Stereo
"Whiskey and You"	2015	—	35	36	—	—	RIAA: Platinum; MC: Platinum	Traveller
"Fire Away"	2015	— (Note: "Fire Away" did not enter the Billboard Hot 100, but peaked at number six on the Bubbling Under Hot 100 Singles chart.)	25	14	—	—	RIAA: 5× Platinum; MC: Platinum; RMNZ: Platinum	Traveller
"Outlaw State of Mind"	2015	—	45	42	—	—	RIAA: Platinum; MC: Gold	Traveller
"Might as Well Get Stoned"	2015	—	44	—	—	—	RIAA: Platinum; MC: Gold	Traveller
"Was It 26"	2015	—	—	—	—	—	RIAA: Gold	Traveller
"Daddy Doesn't Pray Anymore"	2015	—	—	—	—	—	RIAA: Gold	Traveller
"More of You"	2015	—	—	—	—	—	RIAA: Gold; MC: Gold	Traveller
"The Devil Named Music"	2015	—	—	—	—	—	RIAA: Gold	Traveller
"Sometimes I Cry"	2015	—	—	—	—	—	RIAA: Gold	Traveller
"You Are My Sunshine" (Morgane Stapleton with Chris Stapleton)	2016	—	—	41	—	—		Southern Family
"I Was Wrong"	2017	—	41	—	—	—	RIAA: Platinum; MC: Gold; RMNZ: Gold	From A Room: Volume 1
"Without Your Love"	2017	—	—	—	—	—	RIAA: Gold; MC: Gold	From A Room: Volume 1
"Death Row"	2017	—	—	—	—	—	RIAA: Gold	From A Room: Volume 1
"Hard Livin'"	2017	—	—	—	—	—	RIAA: Gold; MC: Gold	From A Room: Volume 2
"I Want Love"	2018	—	—	22	—	—		Restoration: Reimagining the Songs of Elton John and Bernie Taupin
"A Simple Song"	2019	—	—	23	—	—	RIAA: Platinum; MC: Gold; RMNZ: Gold	From A Room: Volume 2
"Maggie's Song"	2020	— (Note: "Maggie's Song" did not enter the Billboard Hot 100, but peaked at number 18 on the Digital Songs Sales chart.)	50	10	—	—	RIAA: Gold; MC: Gold	Starting Over
"Devil Always Made Me Think Twice"	2020	—	—	—	—	—	RIAA: Gold; MC: Gold; RMNZ: Gold	Starting Over
"Nashville, TN"	2020	—	—	—	—	—	RIAA: Gold	Starting Over
"Only Thing That's Gone" (Morgan Wallen featuring Chris Stapleton)	2021	90	32	16	67	178	RIAA: Platinum; MC: Platinum; RMNZ: Gold	Dangerous: The Double Album
"What Am I Gonna Do"	2023	— (Note: "What Am I Gonna Do" did not enter the Billboard Hot 100, but peaked at number three on the Bubbling Under Hot 100 Singles chart.)	30	—	78	—	RIAA: Gold	Higher
"Loving You on My Mind"	2023	—	—	—	—	—	RIAA: Gold	Higher
"California Sober" (Post Malone featuring Chris Stapleton)	2024	34	14	—	30	62		F-1 Trillion
"—" denotes releases that did not chart

== Guest appearances ==
Title	Year	Other artist(s)	Album
"Cheese Please"	2007		What's Cooking? (Inspired By the Movie Ratatouille)
"Save the Bones for Henry Jones"	2007		What's Cooking? (Inspired By the Movie Ratatouille)
"Feel So Bad"	2013	Roosevelt Collier and Steve Fishell	The Big E: A Salute to Steel Guitarist Buddy Emmons
"Two Brothers"	2013		Divided & United: The Songs of the Civil War
"The Climb"	2014	Jessi Alexander and Morgane Stapleton	Down Home
"I Ain't Living Long Like This"	2017		Outlaw: Celebrating the Music of Waylon Jennings (Live)
"My Heroes Have Always Been Cowboys"	2017	Willie Nelson	Outlaw: Celebrating the Music of Waylon Jennings (Live)
"Detroit City"	2017	Bobby Bare	Things Change
"Amanda"	2017	Morgane Stapleton	Gentle Giants: The Songs of Don Williams
"Gotta Serve Somebody"	2018	Jamey Johnson, Willie Nelson and Lee Ann Womack	Muscle Shoals: Small Town, Big Sound
"Don't Let Me Down"	2019	Sheryl Crow and Brandon Flowers	Imagine: John Lennon 75th Birthday Concert (Live)
"You've Got to Hide Your Love Away"	2019	Kris Kristofferson and Willie Nelson	Imagine: John Lennon 75th Birthday Concert (Live)
"All You Need Is Love"	2019	Aloe Blacc, Eric Church, Sheryl Crow, John Fogerty, Peter Frampton, Brandon Flowers, Juanes, Kris Kristofferson, Pat Monahan, Tom Morello, Willie Nelson, The Roots, Spoon and Steven Tyler	Imagine: John Lennon 75th Birthday Concert (Live)
"Pistol Packin' Mama"	2020	The Dirty Knobs	Wreckless Abandon
"Whiskey River"	2020		Willie Nelson American Outlaw (Live)
"Always On My Mind"	2020	Wille Nelson and Derek Trucks	Willie Nelson American Outlaw (Live)
"On the Road Again"	2020	Willie Nelson, The Avett Brothers, Bobby Bare, Dave Matthews, Emmylou Harris, Eric Church, George Strait, Jack Johnson, Jamey Johnson, Jimmy Buffett, Kris Kristofferson, Lee Ann Womack, Lukas Nelson, Lyle Lovett, Margo Price, Micah Nelson, Nathaniel Rateliff, Norah Jones, The Little Willies, Ray Benson, Sheryl Crow, Steve Earle, Susan Tedeschi, Derek Trucks, and Vince Gill	Willie Nelson American Outlaw (Live)
"Roll Me Up and Smoke Me When I Die"	2020	Willie Nelson, The Avett Brothers, Bobby Bare, Dave Matthews, Emmylou Harris, Eric Church, George Strait, Jack Johnson, Jamey Johnson, Jimmy Buffett, Kris Kristofferson, Lee Ann Womack, Lukas Nelson, Lyle Lovett, Margo Price, Micah Nelson, Nathaniel Rateliff, Norah Jones, The Little Willies, Ray Benson, Sheryl Crow, Steve Earle, Susan Tedeschi, Derek Trucks, and Vince Gill	Willie Nelson American Outlaw (Live)
"Farther Along"	2021	Leslie Jordan and Morgane Stapleton	Company's Comin'
"Small Town Hypocrite"	2021	Caylee Hammack	Small Town Hypocrite - Single
"The War Inside"	2021	Tom Morello	The Atlas Underground Fire
"Night Moves"	2023	Dolly Parton	Rockstar
"California Sober"	2024	Post Malone	F-1 Trillion

== Songwriting credits ==
Year	Artist	Song	Written with
2003	Patty Loveless	"Higher Than the Wall"	Mike Henderson
2003	Gary Allan	"Drinkin' Dark Whiskey"	Mike Henderson
2004	Trent Willmon	"Home Sweet Holiday Inn"	Trent Willmon and Jameson Clark
2005	Josh Turner	"Your Man"	Chris DuBois and Jace Everett
2006	Lee Ann Womack	"Finding My Way Back Home"	Craig Wiseman
2006	Darryl Worley	"Nothin' but a Love Thang"	Steve Leslie and Worley
2006	Trace Adkins	"Swing"	Frank Rogers
2007	Kenny Chesney	"Never Wanted Nothing More"	Ronnie Bowman
2007	Tim McGraw	"Whiskey and You"	—N/a
2008	Josh Turner with Trisha Yearwood	"Another Try"	Jeremy Spillman
2008	Lee Ann Womack	"Either Way"	Tim James and Kendell Marvel
2010	Darius Rucker	"Come Back Song"	Darius Rucker and Casey Beathard
2010	Steel Magnolia	"Keep On Lovin' You"	Trent Willmon
2011	Adele	"If It Hadn't Been for Love"	Mike Henderson
2011	Alison Krauss and Union Station	"Miles to Go"	Barry Bales
2011	George Strait	"Love's Gonna Make It Alright"	Al Anderson
2012	Thomas Rhett	"Something to Do with My Hands"	Thomas Rhett and Lee Thomas Miller
2012	Alan Jackson	"Talk Is Cheap"	Guy Clark and Morgane Hayes
2013	Luke Bryan	"Drink a Beer"	Jim Beavers
2014	Jason Aldean	"Too Fast"	Lee Thomas Miller
2015	Thomas Rhett	"Crash and Burn"	Jesse Frasure
2015	Thomas Rhett	"South Side"	Thomas Rhett and Jesse Frasure
2016	Jake Owen	"If He Ain't Gonna Love You"	Shane McAnally and Luke Laird
2016	Charles Kelley	"Lonely Girl"	Jesse Frasure
2018	Justin Timberlake feat. Alicia Keys	"Morning Light"	Justin Timberlake, Eric Hudson, Elliott Ives, Robin Tadross
2018	Justin Timberlake	"The Hard Stuff"	Justin Timberlake, Eric Hudson, Elliott Ives, Robin Tadross
2020	Jade Eagleson	"Boom Town"	Lee Miller
2020	Kelly Clarkson	"Born to Die"	Justin Timberlake
2023	Pink	"Just Say I'm Sorry"	Alecia Moore
2025	Miranda Lambert and Chris Stapleton	"A Song to Sing"	Miranda Lambert, Jenee Fleenor, Jesse Frasure
2025	Warren Zeiders	"Love on the Line"	Al Anderson
2026	Melissa Etheridge	"The Other Side of Blue"	Melissa Etheridge

== Music videos ==
Year	Video	Director
2016	"Fire Away"	Tim Mattia
2018	"Say Something" (Justin Timberlake featuring Chris Stapleton)	La Blogothèque
2019	"Blow" (Ed Sheeran with Chris Stapleton and Bruno Mars)	Bruno Mars & Florent Dechard
2019	"Second One to Know"	David Coleman
2020	"Starting Over"	Becky Fluke
2024	"Think I'm In Love With You"	Running Bear
2025	"White Horse"	Running Bear
