= Southern Streamline =

1997 song by John Fogerty

Single by John Fogerty

from the album Blue Moon Swamp
- Released: May 1997
- Recorded: 1997
- Genre: Rock, country rock, rockabilly
- Length: 3:56
- Label: Warner Bros.
- Songwriter: John Fogerty
- Producer: John Fogerty

John Fogerty singles chronology
| "Walking in a Hurricane" (1997) | "Southern Streamline" (1997) | "Blueboy" (1997) |

"Southern Streamline" is a song written and recorded by John Fogerty for his 1997 album Blue Moon Swamp. It was released as the second single from the album.

== Background and composition ==
According to Fogerty, "Southern Streamline" was inspired by train songs, which he greatly enjoyed growing up. The opening lyric "Mama, I'm on fire!" refers to his early desire to improve at guitar. Fogerty plays his custom Fender Telecaster on the song, which formerly was owned by the Eagles, and a Vox AC30 amplifier. He wrote the song in Newhall, California, near the first commercially successful oil well in California. He got the idea for the song after picking his daughter up from a slumber party. Fogerty originally envisioned the song as a gospel number, but transformed it into a guitar song after working in the studio. "Southern Streamline" features backing vocals from the bluegrass group Lonesome River Band.

== Release and reception ==
"Southern Streamline" peaked at No. 67 on the Hot Country Songs chart on August 16, 1997 and spent two weeks on the chart. The song was generally well-received by critics. Anthony Violanti of The Buffalo News called it a "rocking hoedown." Soren Andersen of The News Tribune considered it one of the album's "rollicking rockers." Jeff Reynolds of The Modesto Bee compared "Southern Streamline" favorably to Fogerty's past work in Creedence Clearwater Revival. The Salina Journal's Michael Cote called it a "musical cousin of "Bad Moon Rising"."

== Other versions ==
"Southern Streamline" has become a staple in Fogerty's stage performances. It was covered by South African country musician Alan Ladd for his 2018 album Country Things.

== Charts ==
| Chart (1997) | Peak position |
|---|---|
| US Hot Country Songs (Billboard) | 67 |
| Canada Country | 83 |
