= Millionaire (Chris Stapleton song) =

Single by Chris Stapleton

from the album From A Room: Volume 2
- Released: October 20, 2017
- Studio: RCA Studio A (Nashville, Tennessee)
- Genre: Heartland rock; country rock
- Length: 3:30
- Label: Mercury Nashville
- Songwriter: Kevin Welch
- Producers: Dave Cobb; Chris Stapleton

Chris Stapleton singles chronology
"Broken Halos" (2017)	"Millionaire" (2017)	"Say Something" (2018)

"Millionaire" is a song recorded by American singer-songwriter Chris Stapleton for his third studio album From A Room: Volume 2 (2017). It was written by Kevin Welch in 2002, and soul singer Solomon Burke included it on his 2006 country music tribute album Nashville.

The song was released as a promotional single of Volume 2 on October 20, 2017, and was released to country radio as the album's first single on April 23, 2018. The song received a nomination for Best Country Solo Performance at the 61st Annual Grammy Awards.

== Composition ==
"Millionaire" is a mid-tempo soul-influenced heartland rock and country rock ballad driven by acoustic guitar. Lyrically, the song is about "spare love" and appreciating relationship closeness over material wealth. Stapleton sings on the chorus accompanied by his wife and collaborator, Morgane.

The song is composed in the key of B-flat major with a slow tempo. It primarily follows the chord pattern B♭5-F5-E♭^{add9}-B♭5-E♭^{add9}-B♭5. Song was recorded and sung by Chris LeDoux on After the Storm in 2002

== Critical reception ==
Robert Crawford of Rolling Stone said the song "gets a swinging, Heartbreakers-worthy update by Stapleton and company," and considered Morgane's harmonies as "the song's secret weapon" which "trace her husband's melodies at every twist and turn." Ari Shapiro of NPR felt Stapleton's reading of "Millionaire" "has a laidback, Petty-esque jangle and, thanks to the Stapletons' cozy harmonizing throughout, a feeling of equanimity."

== Commercial performance ==
The song has sold 250,000 copies in the United States as of April 2018.

== Live performances ==
On December 4, 2017, Stapleton performed "Millionaire" on Jimmy Kimmel Live!, and on December 6 on The Ellen DeGeneres Show.

== Charts ==
=== Weekly charts ===
Chart (2018–2019)	Peak position
Canada Hot 100 (Billboard)	84
Canada Country (Billboard)	6
US Billboard Hot 100	47
US Country Airplay (Billboard)	2
US Hot Country Songs (Billboard)	4

=== Year-end charts ===
Chart (2018)	Position
US Hot Country Songs (Billboard)	57
Chart (2019)	Position
US Country Airplay (Billboard)	27
US Hot Country Songs (Billboard)	40

== Certifications ==
Certifications for "Millionaire"
Region	Certification	Certified units/sales
Australia (ARIA)	Gold	35,000^{‡}
Canada (Music Canada)	2× Platinum	160,000^{‡}
New Zealand (RMNZ)	Platinum	30,000^{‡}
United States (RIAA)	3× Platinum	3,000,000^{‡}
^{‡} Sales+streaming figures based on certification alone.
