= Blue Moon Swamp =

1997 album by John Fogerty

Studio album by John Fogerty
- Released: May 20, 1997
- Studios: The Lighthouse, North Hollywood, California
- Genres: Swamp rock; roots rock; blues rock
- Length: 44:42
- Labels: Warner Bros, BMG
- Producer: John Fogerty

John Fogerty chronology
Eye of the Zombie (1986)	Blue Moon Swamp (1997)	Premonition (1998)

Singles from Blue Moon Swamp
- 1. "Walking in a Hurricane" Released: May 12, 1997; 2. "Southern Streamline" Released: May 1997; 3. "Blueboy" Released: October 1997

Professional ratings
Review scores
Source	Rating
AllMusic	4.5/5 stars
Rolling Stone	4/5 stars
Uncut	3/5 stars

Blue Moon Swamp is the fifth solo studio album by the American guitarist and singer-songwriter John Fogerty, released on May 20, 1997. The Lonesome River Band provided backing vocals on "Southern Streamline" and "Rambunctious Boy". Other vocal backing was provided by The Waters on "Blueboy" and the Fairfield Four on "A Hundred and Ten in the Shade". Luis Conte accompanied on select songs as a guest percussionist. In 1998, Blue Moon Swamp won Best Rock Album at the 40th Grammy Awards. The track "Blueboy" was nominated for Best Male Rock Vocal Performance.

== Cover ==
When asked about if the wet Fender guitar used on the cover was real, Fogerty said, "Oh yes, it is a real photo. I bought a new Fender Stratocaster just for this occasion. After the shooting we dried every part of the guitar. Maybe I should put it on show now".

== 2004 remastered version ==
In 2004 a remastered version of Blue Moon Swamp was released. It features renewed sound and two bonus tracks, which were previously released on singles in either 1997 or 1998, "Just Pickin'" and "Endless Sleep".

== Track listing ==
All tracks are written by John Fogerty.

No.	Title	Length
1.	"Southern Streamline"	3:56
2.	"Hot Rod Heart"	3:26
3.	"Blueboy"	4:04
4.	"A Hundred and Ten in the Shade"	4:19
5.	"Rattlesnake Highway"	4:17
6.	"Bring It Down to Jelly Roll"	2:37
7.	"Walking in a Hurricane"	3:41
8.	"Swamp River Days"	3:36
9.	"Rambunctious Boy"	3:51
10.	"Joy of My Life"	3:52
11.	"Blue Moon Nights"	2:33
12.	"Bad Bad Boy"	4:26

Bonus tracks (2004 remaster)
No.	Title	Writer(s)	Length
13.	"Just Pickin'"	Freddie King	2:08
14.	"Endless Sleep"	Jody Reynolds, Dolores Nance	2:36

== Personnel ==
As published in the liner notes of Warner Bros CD release 9 45426-2:

- John Fogerty – guitar, lap steel, dobro, handclaps, electric sitar, farfisa organ, tambourine (on "Bring It Down to Jelly Roll"), backing vocals (on "Walking in a Hurricane" and " Bad Bad Boy"), mandolin, irish bouzouki, vocals, arrangements, production
- Kenny Aronoff – drums (on most tracks), percussion (on "Joy of my Life")
- Chad Smith – drums (on "Walking in a Hurricane")
- Chester Thompson – drums (on "Blueboy" and "Bad Bad Boy")
- Vinnie Colaiuta – drums (on "Swamp River Days")
- Eddie Bayers – drums (on "A Hundred and Ten in the Shade")
- Jeff Donavan – drums (on "Southern Streamline" and "Blue Moon Nights")
- Bob Glaub – bass guitar (on most tracks), handclaps (on "Blueboy")
- Donald Dunn – bass guitar (on "Blueboy")
- Howie Epstein – bass guitar (on "Rambunctious Boy")
- John Clayton – bass guitar (on "A Hundred and Ten in the Shade")
- Michael Rhodes – bass guitar (on "Southern Streamline")
- Phil Chen – bass guitar (on "Bad Bad Boy")
- Dave Taylor – bass guitar (on "Walking in a Hurricane")
- Luis Conte – clavé, maracas, tambourine, percussion, shaker
- Lonesome River Band (Ronnie Bowman, Don Rigsby, Kenny Smith) – backing vocals (on "Southern Streamline" and "Rambunctious Boy")
- The Waters (Julia Waters, Maxine Waters, Oren Waters) – backing vocals (on "Blueboy")
- The Fairfield Four (James Hill, Isaac Freeman, Wilson Waters, Jr., Robert Hamlett, Joe Rice) – backing vocals (on "A Hundred and Ten in the Shade")
- Ryan Freeland – handclaps (on "Hot Rod Heart")
- Bob Fogerty – handclaps
- Andy Brauer – handclaps (on "Blueboy")
- Tommy "V" Verdonck – handclaps (on "Bring It Down to Jelly Roll" and "Rambunctious Boy")
- Lyndsay, Shane, Tyler, Julie – kids in the crowd (on "Blueboy")
- Bob Clearmountain – mixing
- John Lowson – engineering
- Bob Ludwig – mastering (at Gateway Mastering Studios)
- Linda Cobb – art direction, design
- Kip Lott – photography, CD label
- Larry Corby – booklet back cover design
- Lonesome River Band courtesy of Sugar Hill Records

== Charts ==
=== Weekly charts ===
Chart (1997)	Peak position
Australian Albums (ARIA)	8
Austrian Albums (Ö3 Austria)	46
Belgian Albums (Ultratop Flanders)	13
Belgian Albums (Ultratop Wallonia)	45
Dutch Albums (Album Top 100)	19
Finnish Albums (Suomen virallinen lista)	1
German Albums (Offizielle Top 100)	28
New Zealand Albums (RMNZ)	30
Norwegian Albums (VG-lista)	3
Swedish Albums (Sverigetopplistan)	1
Swiss Albums (Schweizer Hitparade)	26
US Billboard 200	37

=== Year-end charts ===
Chart (1997)	Position
Australian Albums (ARIA)	38
US Billboard 200	169

== Certifications ==
Region	Certification	Certified units/sales
Australia (ARIA)	Platinum	70,000^{^}
Finland (Musiikkituottajat)	Gold	27,529
Norway (IFPI Norway)	Platinum	50,000^{*}
Sweden (GLF)	2× Platinum	160,000^{^}
United States (RIAA)	Gold	500,000^{^}
^{*} Sales figures based on certification alone.^{^} Shipments figures based on certification alone.
