= Billboard Music Award for Top Selling Album =

Annual American music award

The Billboard Music Award for Top Selling Album was first presented in 2018.

== Winners and nominees ==
Year	Album	Artist/Winner	Other nominees	Ref.
2018	Reputation	Taylor Swift	Damn – Kendrick Lamar; Beautiful Trauma – Pink; From A Room: Volume 1 – Chris Stapleton; ÷ (Divide) – Ed Sheeran	
