= Walking in a Hurricane =

- Australian CD maxi-single cover.

Single by John Fogerty

from the album Blue Moon Swamp
- Released: May 12, 1997
- Genre: Rock
- Length: 3:41
- Label: Warner Bros.
- Songwriter: Fogerty
- Producer: Fogerty

John Fogerty singles chronology
"Change in the Weather" (1986)	"Walking in a Hurricane" (1997)	"Blueboy" (1997)

Music video
- "Walking in a Hurricane" on YouTube

"Walking in a Hurricane" is a song by the American musician John Fogerty, released as the lead single from his fifth solo studio album Blue Moon Swamp (1997) on May 12, 1997. It features Red Hot Chili Peppers drummer Chad Smith on drums.

== Background ==
"Walking in a Hurricane" uses the eye of a hurricane as a metaphor to sing about the pain Fogerty is willing to endure to get his lover back. In a Vintage Guitar magazine interview, Fogerty told the interviewer about the feeling he was going for on the track, he explained it was "Just loud, "almost-sinister" rock and roll; something that would hopefully get someone’s attention the first time it was heard, like "Satisfaction" did."

== Release and reception ==
In a review of Blue Moon Swamp for the Houston Chronicle, Bruce Westbrook called it a "robust rocker with a fervent vocal chorus." adding that Fogerty plays "some mean guitar on this track and others" Fogerty himself admitted it was the only song he didn't like as much. LA Weekly writer Michael Lipton believed it "most effectively bridges the old and new into a driving, letter-perfect single." Oakland Tribune critic William Friar said in a live performance review that it is a "straight ahead rock[er that] recalled a particularly raucous Tom Petty song" Evansville Courier & Press' Gordon Engelhardt writes it "boasts a catchy chorus and stingy, bluesy guitar licks from Fogerty."

== Personnel ==
According to the liner notes of the album:

- John Fogerty – vocals, all guitars
- Chad Smith – drums
- Dave Taylor – bass
- Luis Conte – tambourine, maracas

== Charts ==
Weekly chart performance for "Walking in a Hurricane"
Chart (1997)	Peak position
Australian Singles (Kent Music Report)	71
US Mainstream Rock (Billboard)	14
