= Think I'm in Love with You =

2023 song by Chris Stapleton

Single by Chris Stapleton

from the album Higher
- Released: February 12, 2024
- Studio: RCA Studio A (Nashville, Tennessee)
- Genre: Country, blues
- Length: 3:42
- Label: Mercury Nashville
- Songwriter: Chris Stapleton
- Producers: Chris Stapleton; Morgane Stapleton; Dave Cobb

Chris Stapleton singles chronology
"White Horse" (2023)	"Think I'm in Love with You" (2024)	"A Song to Sing" (2025)

Music video
- "Think I'm in Love with You" on YouTube

"Think I'm in Love with You" is a song by American singer-songwriter Chris Stapleton. It was first released on September 8, 2023, as a promotional single from his fifth studio album Higher (2023), before being released as the album's second single on February 12, 2024.

== Composition ==
The song includes elements of blues, electric guitar, slow and "laid-back" grooving rhythm, and a bassline described as "tight" and "burbling". Lyrically, Chris Stapleton confesses his love for a woman and devotion toward her, emphasizing the power she holds over him. The bridge features a violin section that "gestures in the general direction of '70s soul", while Stapleton repeats the lyrics from the chorus.

== Critical reception ==
Maxim Mower of Holler commented the song "feels cut from the same sonic cloth" as Stapleton's song "White Horse", "but with a welcome boost of swagger and playfulness introduced." Tom Breihan of Stereogum, describing the song as "downright funky", stated "This doesn't really sound like country music at all, and Stapleton's got the voice to pull it off." Mary Claire Crabtree of Whiskey Riff wrote "The vocals are the focal point of this single, highlighting that he is more than an outlaw singer that can wail some powerful notes. The softer side of Stapleton on this track highlights his vocal control and the blend created between melodies and vocals. But make no mistake, he picks his spots to let it rip."

== Music video ==
The music video was directed by Running Bear and premiered on August 29, 2024, with actor Andre Royo playing the main character.

== Other versions ==
Chris Stapleton and singer Dua Lipa performed a duet of the song at the 59th Academy of Country Music Awards. A recording of their performance was released to streaming services on May 20, 2024.

== Charts ==
=== Weekly charts ===
Weekly chart performance for "Think I'm in Love with You"
Chart (2023–2025)	Peak position
Canada Hot 100 (Billboard)	67
Canada Country (Billboard)	25
US Billboard Hot 100	49
US Country Airplay (Billboard)	12
US Hot Country Songs (Billboard)	12

=== Year-end charts ===
2024 year-end chart performance for "Think I'm in Love with You"
Chart (2024)	Position
US Hot Country Songs (Billboard)	18

2025 year-end chart performance for "Think I'm in Love with You"
Chart (2025)	Position
Canada Country (Billboard)	57
US Country Airplay (Billboard)	50
US Hot Country Songs (Billboard)	47

== Certifications ==
Certification for "Think I'm in Love with You"
Region	Certification	Certified units/sales
New Zealand (RMNZ)	2× Platinum	60,000^{‡}
United States (RIAA)	2× Platinum	2,000,000^{‡}
^{‡} Sales+streaming figures based on certification alone.
