= Starting Over (Chris Stapleton song) =

2020 single by Chris Stapleton

Single by Chris Stapleton

from the album Starting Over
- Released: August 28, 2020
- Genre: Country
- Length: 4:00
- Label: Mercury Nashville; Sound
- Songwriters: Chris Stapleton; Mike Henderson
- Producers: Dave Cobb; Chris Stapleton

Chris Stapleton singles chronology
| "Love Me Anyway" (2019) | "Starting Over" (2020) | "Cold" (2020) |

Audio video
- "Starting Over" on YouTube

"Starting Over" is a song co-written and recorded by American singer-songwriter Chris Stapleton, released on August 28, 2020 as the lead single from his fourth studio album of the same name, released on November 13, 2020. The song features background vocals from Stapleton's wife Morgane.

== Background ==
In late August 2020, Stapleton wiped all his social media pages clean. On August 26, he posted a cryptic video and the following day previewed the track, along with another song titled "Watch You Burn", while also announcing that his next album would be titled Starting Over. The song is Stapleton's first single since 2018's "Millionaire", although, during his break, he collaborated with other artists, including Justin Timberlake, Pink, and John Mayer. Stapleton played the track while on tour in late 2019. It was written by him and his SteelDrivers bandmate Mike Henderson.

Stapleton performed the song live for the first time at the 54th Annual Country Music Association Awards.

== Composition ==
"Starting Over" carries a "raw, stripped down and vulnerable" theme, with Stapleton singing of looking for new horizons, in "perpetual motion". The love song fuses acoustic guitar chords and a percussive shake, while drummer Derek Mixon delivers a "brushed" snare rhythm, which Rolling Stone's Joseph Hudak said evokes Willie Nelson's version of "City of New Orleans". The song is reminiscent of Stapleton's rustic sound, aided by the Hammond B3 organ played by Benmont Tench.

== Critical reception ==
Rolling Stone's Joseph Hudak highlighted the single, stating it "is for a new day and, like its title implies, a fresh start", while noting that Stapleton "admits, the road is long and hard, but with loved ones by our side [...] we'll get where we're going". Billboard's Jason Lipshutz listed it among the most essential releases of the week, and, referencing the COVID-19 pandemic, said the song is "designed for this moment, an exhalation in the middle of an anxiety-stricken year, with Stapleton's gruff voice providing hope for a better future".

== Charts ==
=== Weekly charts ===
| Chart (2020–2021) | Peak position |
|---|---|
| Canada Hot 100 (Billboard) | 21 |
| Canada Country (Billboard) | 3 |
| US Billboard Hot 100 | 25 |
| US Country Airplay (Billboard) | 2 |
| US Hot Country Songs (Billboard) | 1 |
| US Rolling Stone Top 100 | 33 |

=== Year-end charts ===
| Chart (2020) | Position |
|---|---|
| US Hot Country Songs (Billboard) | 69 |

| Chart (2021) | Position |
|---|---|
| Canada (Canadian Hot 100) | 63 |
| US Billboard Hot 100 | 53 |
| US Country Airplay (Billboard) | 23 |
| US Hot Country Songs (Billboard) | 8 |

== Certifications ==
| Region | Certification | Certified units/sales |
|---|---|---|
| Australia (ARIA) | Platinum | 70,000^{‡} |
| Canada (Music Canada) | 5× Platinum | 400,000^{‡} |
| New Zealand (RMNZ) | 2× Platinum | 60,000^{‡} |
| United Kingdom (BPI) | Silver | 200,000^{‡} |
| United States (RIAA) | 7× Platinum | 7,000,000^{‡} |
^{‡} Sales+streaming figures based on certification alone.
