= Country (Mo Pitney song) =

Single by Mo Pitney

from the album Behind This Guitar
- Released: December 16, 2014
- Recorded: 2014
- Genre: Neotraditional Country
- Length: 3:17
- Label: Curb
- Songwriters: Mo Pitney; Bill Anderson; Bobby Tomberlin
- Producer: Tony Brown

Mo Pitney singles chronology
"Country" (2014)	"Boy & a Girl Thing" (2015)

"Country" is the debut single by American country music artist Mo Pitney. It serves as the lead single to Pitney's debut studio album via Curb Records, Behind This Guitar. Pitney co-wrote the song with Bill Anderson and Bobby Tomberlin. It was released through Curb Records in 2014.

== Critical reception ==
Billy Dukes of Taste of Country stated, "Mo isn’t making a statement, and he’s not the sign of some traditional country revolution in 2015. But he’s a reminder of how good a simple country song sung by a man who believes in God and George Strait can feel."

== Music video ==
The video was recorded by Wes Edwards and was released to YouTube and CMT through Curb.

== Chart performance ==
The song debuted at No. 50 on Hot Country Songs and No. 57 on Country Airplay.

Chart (2015)	Peak position
US Country Airplay (Billboard)	35
US Hot Country Songs (Billboard)	40
