= Always on My Mind (Willie Nelson album) =

1982 studio album by Willie Nelson

Studio album by Willie Nelson
- Released: February 1982
- Genre: Country
- Length: 33:29
- Label: Columbia
- Producer: Chips Moman

Willie Nelson chronology
Somewhere Over the Rainbow (1981)	Always on My Mind (1982)	The Winning Hand (1982)

Singles from Always on My Mind
- 1. "Always on My Mind" Released: February 1982; 2. "Let It Be Me" Released: July 1982; 3. "Last Thing I Needed First Thing This Morning" Released: November 1982

Professional ratings
Review scores
Source	Rating
Allmusic	2/5 stars

Always on My Mind is the 27th studio album by country singer Willie Nelson. It was the Billboard number one country album of the year for 1982, and stayed 253 weeks on the Billboard Top Country Albums chart, peaking at number one for a total of 22 weeks, as well as spending 99 weeks on the all-genre Billboard 200, peaking at number two for 4 weeks.

== Background and recording ==
During the recording sessions for Nelson's collaboration album with Merle Haggard, Pancho & Lefty, the producer Chips Moman and Bobby Emmons suggested that they record Johnny Christopher's "Always on My Mind". Haggard had no interest in recording a version of the song for the album, so instead Nelson recorded his own version—the first for the album entitled Always on My Mind. In his autobiography, Nelson stated: "We'll never know what would have happened if Merle had really heard the song right. 'Always on My Mind' bowled me over the moment I first heard it, which is one way I pick songs to record".

The rest of the album was constituted by adult-contemporary and pop standards, such as "Do Right Woman, Do Right Man" and Paul Simon's "Bridge Over Troubled Water", as well as re-recordings of his own songs including "Permanently Lonely" (originally recorded for 1969's Good Times LP) and "The Party's Over" (originally recorded for The Party's Over released in 1967).

== Track listing ==
A 2003 re-release of the album included two bonus tracks: "The Man Who Owes Everyone" and "I'm a Memory" (another re-recording of an earlier release).

No.	Title	Writer(s)	Length
1.	"Do Right Woman, Do Right Man"	Chips Moman, Dan Penn	2:58
2.	"Always on My Mind"	Johnny Christopher, Mark James, Wayne Carson Thompson	3:34
3.	"A Whiter Shade of Pale"	Gary Brooker, Keith Reid, Matthew Fisher	4:01
4.	"Let It Be Me"	Mann Curtis, Pierre Delanoë, Gilbert Bécaud	3:33
5.	"Staring Each Other Down"	Chips Moman, Bobby Emmons	2:16
6.	"Bridge over Troubled Water"	Paul Simon	4:39
7.	"Old Fords and a Natural Stone"	Bobby Emmons, Chips Moman	2:33
8.	"Permanently Lonely"	Willie Nelson	2:41
9.	"Last Thing I Needed First Thing This Morning"	Gary P. Nunn, Donna Sioux Farar	4:22
10.	"The Party’s Over"	Willie Nelson	2:52
Total length:			33:29

=== 2003 re-release bonus tracks ===
No.	Title	Writer(s)	Length
11.	"The Man Who Owes Everyone"	Dave Anderson, Willie Nelson	3:16
12.	"I'm a Memory"	Willie Nelson	2:42
Total length:			39:27

== Personnel ==
- Willie Nelson – guitar, vocals
- Gene Chrisman – drums
- Johnny Christopher – guitar, backing vocals
- Bobby Emmons – keyboards
- Mike Leech – bass guitar
- John Marett – saxophone
- Grady Martin – guitar
- Chips Moman – guitar, backing vocals, producer, engineer
- Mickey Raphael – harmonica
- Gary Talley – vocals
- Toni Wine – keyboards, vocals
- Bobby Wood – keyboards, vocals
- Reggie Young – guitar
- Waylon Jennings – vocal (3)

Technical

- Virginia Team – art direction
- Beverly Parker – photography

== Charts ==
=== Chart performance ===
1982 Weekly Chart	Peak position
U.S. Billboard Top Country Albums	1
U.S. Billboard 200	2
Canadian RPM Top Albums	20
Dutch Albums Chart	28
Australian Albums Chart	60

=== End of year charts ===
1982 Year-end Chart	Position
U.S. Billboard Country Album	1
U.S. Cashbox Top 100	7
U.S. Billboard 200	26
Canadian RPM Top Albums	96

=== Charting Singles ===
Single	Peak positions								
Single	US Country	US	US AC	CAN Country	CAN	CAN AC	IRE	AUS	UK
"Always on My Mind"^{[A]}	1	5	2	1	10	4	8	39	49
"Let It Be Me"	2	40	11	1	—	1	—	—	—
"Last Thing I Needed First Thing This Morning"	2	—	—	1	—	—	—	—	—

== Certification ==
Organization	Level	Date
RIAA – USA	4× Platinum	October 21, 1994
