= Mo Pitney =

American country music singer (born 1992)

- Birth name: Morgan Daniel Pitney
- Born: March 24, 1993 (age 32); Cherry Valley, Illinois
- Genres: Neotraditional Country
- Occupation: Singer-songwriter
- Years active: 2014–present
- Labels: Curb
- Website: www.mopitney.com

Morgan Daniel Pitney (born March 24, 1993, in Cherry Valley, Illinois) is an American country music singer. In May 2014, he signed to Curb Records. He has released two studio albums: Behind This Guitar (2016), and Ain't Lookin' Back (2020)

== Musical career ==
Mo Pitney was born in Rockford, Illinois. He began playing drums at 6 and guitar at 12. He played in a bluegrass band with his brother and a friend. Pitney moved to Nashville, Tennessee, where he signed to Curb Records and began working with record producer Tony Brown.

Pitney released his single "Country", in December 2014. He co-wrote the song with Bill Anderson and Bobby Tomberlin. Billy Dukes of Taste of Country reviewed the single positively, saying that "Mo isn’t making a statement, and he’s not the sign of some traditional country revolution in 2015. But he’s a reminder of how good a simple country song sung by a man who believes in God and George Strait can feel." Johnny Nevin of Huffington Post also reviewed Pitney's music favorably, saying that "Mo Pitney knows a couple of really important things about being Country, real Country. One of them is that he knows who he is, and that's always going to be important, because it's the only way anyone can keep becoming the person they really want to be. Just as important though, it seems like Mo Pitney never forgets about everybody else, and how important they are too." It was the third most added country song its first week at radio. The song entered Top 40 on Country Airplay on the chart dated for the week ending June 20, 2015, its nineteenth week on that chart. His second single, "Boy & a Girl Thing", released to country radio on August 31, 2015. It reached #50 on Hot Country Songs in October 2016. His debut album is Behind This Guitar. The album's third single, "Everywhere", went for adds at country radio on February 13, 2017.

Pitney's debut album, Behind This Guitar, was released on October 7, 2016, and featured collaborations with Morgane Stapleton and Mac McAnally. It charted at No. 10 on Billboard's Top Country Albums in its first week.

== Discography ==
=== Studio albums ===
Title	Detai	Sales		
Title	Detai	Sales	US Country	US Albums
Behind This Guitar	Release date: October 7, 2016; Label: Curb Records; Formats: CD, music download	10	76	US: 5,500
Ain't Lookin' Back	Release date: August 14, 2020; Label: Curb Records; Formats: CD, music download	—	—	
Cherokee Pioneer	Release date: April 18, 2025			

=== Singles ===
Year	Single	Peak chart positions		Album
Year	Single	US Country	US Country Airplay	Album
2014	"Country"	40	35	Behind This Guitar
2015	"Boy & a Girl Thing"	50	47	Behind This Guitar
2017	"Everywhere"	—	—	Behind This Guitar
2020	"Ain't Bad for a Good Ol' Boy"	—	—	Ain't Lookin' Back
2021	"Local Honey"	—	—	Ain't Lookin' Back
2023	"Mattress on the Floor"	—	—	Ain't Lookin' Back
"—" denotes releases that did not chart

=== Music videos ===
Year	Video	Director
2015	"Country"	Wes Edwards
2015	"Boy & a Girl Thing"	Wes Edwards
2016	"Everywhere"	Peter Zavadil
2017	"Clean Up on Aisle Five"	
2018	"Come Do a Little Life"	Trey Fanjoy
