= Boy & a Girl Thing =

Single by Mo Pitney

from the album Behind This Guitar
- Released: August 31, 2015
- Recorded: 2015
- Genre: Neotraditional Country
- Length: 3:03
- Label: Curb
- Songwriter(s): Mo Pitney; Don Sampson
- Producer(s): Tony Brown

Mo Pitney singles chronology
"Country" (2014)	"Boy & a Girl Thing" (2015)	"Everywhere" (2016)

"Boy & a Girl Thing" is a song co-written and recorded by American country music artist Mo Pitney. It was released to radio on August 31, 2015 as the second single from his debut studio album, Behind This Guitar. The song was written by Pitney and Don Sampson and features Morgane Stapleton singing background vocals.

== Critical reception ==
Taste of Country reviewed the single favorably, saying that "During “Boy & a Girl Thing,” Mo Pitney continues to recall a country generation most think has passed on. He does it effortlessly, with just a few chords, an honest sound and a smile as big as his home state of Illinois." Liz Austin of For The Country Record also favorably reviewed the song, saying that "This is a really sweet song that paints a very real picture of what goes down in the relationship between girls and boys. Pitney pulls this song off like a pro, making it both enjoyable and believable. The soft production and Pitney’s smooth, sweet vocals really enhance the song. I’m certainly looking forward to hearing more from Pitney and hope to see his career succeed! We need more artists like Mo, stone cold country."

== Music video ==
The music video was directed by Wes Edwards and premiered in November 2015.

== Chart performance ==
Chart (2015)	Peak position
US Country Airplay (Billboard)	47
US Hot Country Songs (Billboard)	50
