= You Should Probably Leave =

2021 single by Chris Stapleton

Single by Chris Stapleton

from the album Starting Over
- Released: May 17, 2021
- Genre: Country
- Length: 3:33
- Label: Mercury Nashville
- Songwriters: Chris Stapleton; Ashley Gorley; Chris DuBois
- Producers: Dave Cobb; Chris Stapleton

Chris Stapleton singles chronology
"Cold" (2020)	"You Should Probably Leave" (2021)	"Glow" (2021)

"You Should Probably Leave" is a song recorded by American singer-songwriter Chris Stapleton, it was released on May 17, 2021, as the third single from his fourth studio album Starting Over. The song was co-written by Ashley Gorley, Chris DuBois and Stapleton, who also produced the track with Dave Cobb.

No official music video was made for the song.

== Background ==
The song had been written back in 2014. In a clip from October 2014, Stapleton was seen performing in Nashville on a simple stage, and his wife Morgane joined in.

== Content ==
"You Should Probably Leave" describes a story about an on-again, off-again couple who cannot seem to keep themselves from coming back to one another, even though they know their story will not end well.

== Critical reception ==
The song won the Best Country Solo Performance Grammy Award in 2022.

== Charts ==
=== Weekly charts ===
Weekly chart performance for "You Should Probably Leave"
Chart (2021–2022)	Peak position
Australia Country Hot 50 (TMN)	9
Canada Hot 100 (Billboard)	35
Canada Country (Billboard)	1
Ireland (IRMA)	81
US Billboard Hot 100	28
US Country Airplay (Billboard)	1
US Hot Country Songs (Billboard)	1

=== Year-end charts ===
2021 year-end chart performance for "You Should Probably Leave"
Chart (2021)	Position
US Hot Country Songs (Billboard)	32

2022 year-end chart performance for "You Should Probably Leave"
Chart (2022)	Position
US Billboard Hot 100	79
US Country Airplay (Billboard)	34
US Hot Country Songs (Billboard)	23

== Certifications ==
Region	Certification	Certified units/sales
Australia (ARIA)	Platinum	70,000^{‡}
Canada (Music Canada)	4× Platinum	320,000^{‡}
New Zealand (RMNZ)	5× Platinum	150,000^{‡}
United Kingdom (BPI)	Platinum	600,000^{‡}
United States (RIAA)	8× Platinum	8,000,000^{‡}
^{‡} Sales+streaming figures based on certification alone.
