= Joy of My Life =

1997 song by John Fogerty

Song by John Fogerty

from the album Blue Moon Swamp
- Released: May 20, 1997
- Recorded: 1997
- Genre: Country rock
- Length: 3:52
- Label: Warner Bros.; BMG
- Songwriter: John Fogerty
- Producer: John Fogerty

Audio video
- "Joy of My Life" on YouTube

"Joy of My Life" is a 1997 song written and originally recorded by American musician John Fogerty. It was released on his 1997 fifth solo album Blue Moon Swamp. In 2022, the song was released by country music singer Chris Stapleton as a single from his album Starting Over.

== History ==
The tenth track on Blue Moon Swamp, "Joy of My Life," was written, produced and arranged by Fogerty, engineered by John Lowson and mixed by Bob Clearmountain. It is a conversational song about his wife Julie, and the first love song Fogerty has written unless "Long As I Can See the Light" is counted. The tune started to evolve in 1991 when Fogerty attended the Oshkosh aviation show in Wisconsin. When the organizers asked "How's Julie?" Fogerty always answered "Well' she's the joy of my life". Then the organizers: "You're always saying 'She's the joy of my life'. You should write a song." After getting serious with the dobro in 1992, Fogerty wrote the riff for the song at the Kern River draining an area of the southern Sierra Nevada mountains northeast of Bakersfield in California. The words started coming after returning back home, putting the kids down and lying in bed with his wife. Fogerty also stated he sings "Joy of My Life" to his wife every night. Eventually, it became John Fogerty's first love song.

== Personnel ==
- Dobro, bouzouki (Irish), acoustic guitar, vocals: John Fogerty
- Bass: Bob Glaub
- Drums: Kenny Aronoff
- Claves, tambourine: Luis Conté

== Chris Stapleton cover ==
"Joy of My Life"

Single by Chris Stapleton

from the album Starting Over
- Released: March 22, 2022
- Genre: Country
- Length: 4:34 (album version); 3:43 (radio edit)
- Label: Mercury Nashville
- Songwriter: John Fogerty
- Producers: Dave Cobb; Chris Stapleton

Chris Stapleton singles chronology
"Easy on Me" (2022)	"Joy of My Life" (2022)	"We Don't Fight Anymore" (2023)

Audio video
- "Joy of My Life" on YouTube

On March 22, 2022, country singer Chris Stapleton released his version of the song as a single. The song was originally included on his 2020 album Starting Over. After being released as a single it charted at number 27 on the US Hot Country Songs chart.

=== Charts ===
==== Weekly charts ====
Weekly chart performance for "Joy of My Life"
Chart (2022)	Peak position
Canada Country (Billboard)	43
US Bubbling Under Hot 100 (Billboard)	1
US Country Airplay (Billboard)	25
US Hot Country Songs (Billboard)	27

==== Year-end charts ====
2022 year-end chart performance for "Joy of My Life"
Chart (2022)	Position
US Hot Country Songs (Billboard)	44

=== Certifications ===
Certifications for "Joy of My Life"
Region	Certification	Certified units/sales
Canada (Music Canada)	Platinum	80,000^{‡}
New Zealand (RMNZ)	Platinum	30,000^{‡}
United States (RIAA)	Platinum	1,000,000^{‡}
^{‡} Sales+streaming figures based on certification alone.
