= Blueboy (song) =

Single by John Fogerty

from the album Blue Moon Swamp
- Released: May 1997
- Recorded: 1997
- Genre: Swamp rock
- Length: 4:04
- Label: Warner Bros.
- Songwriter: John Fogerty
- Producer: John Fogerty

John Fogerty singles chronology
"Southern Streamline" (1997)	"Blueboy" (1997)	"Hot Rod Heart" (1997)

"Blueboy" is a song by John Fogerty from his 1997 album Blue Moon Swamp. It was the third single released from the album.

== Recording and release ==
"Blueboy" is the only song by John Fogerty featuring bassist Donald "Duck" Dunn; the backing vocals are sung by singing group The Waters. Fogerty himself used a Danelectro guitar and a 1962 brown Concert amplifier to create a tremolo effect on "Blueboy". The song was released as a single in September 1997, and in summer 1998, a Gerry Wenner directed music video, featuring Fogerty playing at a country barbecue and his wife Julie playing tambourine with sons Shane and Tyler in the audience, was released.

"Blueboy" was first played live in Burbank, California, on May 12, 1997, on the radio special for Album Network. He often played the song live in Europe; overall "Blueboy" was played live 121 times.

== Other releases ==
A home recording during the 2020 COVID-19 pandemic of "Blueboy" was released on the expanded edition of Fogerty's Factory.

== Charts ==
Chart (1997)	Peak position
US Adult Alternative Airplay (Billboard)	6
US Mainstream Rock (Billboard)	32
