= Higher (Chris Stapleton album) =

Studio album by Chris Stapleton
- Released: November 10, 2023
- Studio: RCA Studio A (Nashville, Tennessee)
- Genre: Country; blues rock
- Length: 54:29
- Label: Mercury Nashville
- Producer: Dave Cobb; Chris Stapleton; Morgane Stapleton

Chris Stapleton chronology
Starting Over (2020)	Higher (2023)

Singles from Higher
- 1. "White Horse" Released: July 21, 2023; 2. "Think I'm in Love with You" Released: February 12, 2024

Higher is the fifth studio album by American musician Chris Stapleton, released through Mercury Nashville on November 10, 2023. The album was produced by Dave Cobb, Stapleton and his wife Morgane. It was preceded by the lead single "White Horse".

== Background and recording ==
The album was recorded at RCA Studio A in Nashville, Tennessee, and additionally features producer Dave Cobb on acoustic and electric guitar and Stapleton's wife Morgane on backing vocals, synthesizer and tambourine, along with contributions from members of his touring band J.T. Cure and Derek Mixon, as well as Paul Franklin, and Lee Pardini. A press release stated that the album "span[s] genres and def[ies] easy categorization", while Uproxx described the album and lead single "White Horse" as "emotionally raw and brutally honest".

The track "Loving You on My Mind" was previously recorded by Josh Turner on his 2010 album Haywire.

== Critical reception ==
Professional ratings
Aggregate scores
Source	Rating
Metacritic	76/100
Review scores
Source	Rating
AllMusic	3.5/5 stars
American Songwriter	4.5/5 stars
Exclaim!	7/10
Paste	7.7/10
Slant Magazine	3/5 stars

Higher received a score of 76 out of 100 on review aggregator Metacritic based on five critics' reviews, indicating "generally favorable" reception. Exclaim!'s Dylan Barnabe wrote that while the album "may not muster the same anthemic thunder of singles like 'Might as Well Get Stoned' (though 'White Horse' comes close), [...] it illustrates Stapleton's range and willingness to colour outside the lines", finding that "he's a little bit older and a little bit wiser, but Stapleton is still the same storyteller and he's still got things to say". Alyssa Goldberg of Paste stated, "musically, Higher maintains the same high-caliber energy as Stapleton's previous work [...] However, lyrically Higher is more reserved" than his past work, concluding that "despite [the album's] lyrical shortcomings, Chris Stapleton still reigns high in the country genre and has delivered another admirable album".

Stephen Thomas Erlewine of AllMusic felt that "the heart of Higher resides in stark, intimate ballads and, especially, simmering soul numbers that rely as much on a supple groove as it does on Stapleton's gruff testifying". Lorie Liebig of American Songwriter wrote that "although his sound is more varied than ever, the collection of songs feels cohesive. He's never been an artist too confined by genre lines, but Higher lets Stapleton roam free creatively". John Amen of No Depression wrote, "Stapleton is at once adventurous and a proponent of the tried and true. With Higher, he navigates an array of intriguing sonics. As with previous outings, though, it's his voice — equal parts straight bourbon, aloe balm, Marlboro smoke, and Tupelo honey — that stands out and carries the day. You might call it irresistible, signature, even as it conjures the ghosts of country music's great progenitors."

Slant Magazine's Thomas Bedenbaugh found "White Horse" to be "the best of the album's uptempo cuts, and largely due to its relative lyrical subtlety" as "most of the other songs on Higher are lyrically vague and repetitive in their fixation on the trials of broken, lonely men and the women in their lives".

== Track listing ==
All tracks are written by Chris Stapleton, with additional co-writers as noted.

Higher track listing
No.	Title	Writer(s)	Length
1.	"What Am I Gonna Do"	Miranda Lambert	3:01
2.	"South Dakota"	Dave Cobb; Derek Mixon; J.T. Cure	4:41
3.	"Trust"	Steve McEwan	3:23
4.	"It Takes a Woman"	Ronnie Bowman; Jerry Salley	4:06
5.	"The Fire"	Cobb; Morgane Stapleton; Mixon; Cure	3:45
6.	"Think I'm in Love with You"		3:42
7.	"Loving You on My Mind"	Kendell Marvel; Tim James	3:29
8.	"White Horse"	Dan Wilson	4:27
9.	"Higher"		4:02
10.	"The Bottom"	Lee Miller	4:06
11.	"The Day I Die"	Carolyn Dawn Johnson	4:05
12.	"Crosswind"	Cobb; Mixon; Cure	3:23
13.	"Weight of Your World"	Tim Larsson; Tobias Lundgren; Johan Fransson	3:54
14.	"Mountains of My Mind"		4:25
Total length:			54:29

== Personnel ==
Musicians

- Chris Stapleton – lead vocals (all tracks), electric guitar (tracks 1–4, 6–11, 13), acoustic guitar (1, 3, 5, 10–14), slide guitar (1, 2), 12-string acoustic guitar (3, 13), backing vocals (6–9), string arrangement (6)
- J. T. Cure – bass guitar (1–13)
- Derek Mixon – drums (1–13), shaker (1, 5, 6, 10, 13); bongos, triangle (5)
- Dave Cobb – acoustic guitar (1, 3–6, 8–13), shaker (6, 10, 13), string arrangement (6), nylon-string guitar (7), 12-string acoustic guitar (13)
- Morgane Stapleton – backing vocals (1, 3–5, 7, 8, 10–13), synthesizer (1, 3, 5, 8, 12, 13), tambourine (1, 5–7, 10, 12)
- Lee Pardini – piano (1, 3, 10, 11, 13), synthesizer (5, 13), Hammond B3 (6, 8–10, 13), Wurlitzer electric piano (9, 12, 13)
- Sari Reist – cello (6)
- Austin Hoke – cello (6)
- Kevin Bate – cello (6)
- Kristin Wilkinson – string arrangement (6)
- Stephen Lamb – string arrangement (6)
- Alicia Enstrom – violin (6)
- David Angell – violin (6)
- David Davidson – violin (6)
- Janet Darnall – violin (6)
- Jenny Bifano – violin (6)
- Jung-Min Shin – violin (6)
- Mary Van Osdale – violin (6)
- Paul Franklin – pedal steel (9, 11–13)

Technical

- Chris Stapleton – production
- Morgane Stapleton – production
- Dave Cobb – production
- Pete Lyman – mastering
- Vance Powell – mixing, engineering, immersive mix engineering, recording
- Gena Johnson – recording, additional engineering
- Koehn Terry – additional engineering, mixing assistance
- Michael Fahey – additional engineering, mixing assistance
- Daniel Bacigalupi – mastering assistance
- Philip Smith – recording assistance

== Charts ==
=== Weekly charts ===
Weekly chart performance for Higher
Chart (2023)	Peak position
Australian Albums (ARIA)	13
Australian Country Albums (ARIA)	2
Austrian Albums (Ö3 Austria)	29
Belgian Albums (Ultratop Flanders)	61
Canadian Albums (Billboard)	2
Dutch Albums (Album Top 100)	7
German Albums (Offizielle Top 100)	25
Irish Albums (IRMA)	55
New Zealand Albums (RMNZ)	4
Norwegian Albums (VG-lista)	32
Scottish Albums (OCC)	12
Swiss Albums (Schweizer Hitparade)	15
UK Albums (OCC)	22
UK Americana Albums (OCC)	2
UK Country Albums (OCC)	1
US Billboard 200	3
US Top Country Albums (Billboard)	1

=== Year-end charts ===
2024 year-end chart performance for Higher
Chart (2024)	Position
Australian Country Albums (ARIA)	32
US Billboard 200	56
US Top Country Albums (Billboard)	12

2025 year-end chart performance for Higher
Chart (2025)	Position
US Billboard 200	123
US Top Country Albums (Billboard)	25

== Certifications ==
Certifications for Higher
Region	Certification	Certified units/sales
Canada (Music Canada)	Gold	40,000^{‡}
New Zealand (RMNZ)	Gold	7,500^{‡}
United States (RIAA)	Gold	500,000^{‡}
^{‡} Sales+streaming figures based on certification alone.
