= Starting Over (Chris Stapleton album) =

2020 studio album by Chris Stapleton

Studio album by Chris Stapleton
- Released: November 13, 2020
- Studios: Compass Sound (Nashville, Tennessee); RCA Studio A (Nashville, Tennessee); Muscle Shoals (Sheffield, Alabama)
- Genre: Country
- Length: 54:00
- Label: Mercury Nashville
- Producers: Dave Cobb; Chris Stapleton

Chris Stapleton chronology
From A Room: Volume 2 (2017)	Starting Over (2020)	Higher (2023)

Singles from Starting Over
- 1. "Starting Over" Released: August 28, 2020; 2. "Cold" Released: September 25, 2020; 3. "You Should Probably Leave" Released: May 17, 2021; 4. "Joy of My Life" Released: March 22, 2022

Starting Over is the fourth studio album by American musician Chris Stapleton. The album was released on November 13, 2020, by Mercury Nashville. At the 64th Grammy Awards it won the award for Best Country Album.

== Composition ==
The singer-songwriter's fourth recording project consists of fourteen tracks produced with Dave Cobb, and features writing by John Fogerty, Mike Henderson, Mike Campbell, Susanna Clarke and Guy Clark. Interviewed by Vulture Magazine, Stapleton said: "There’s a lot on this record that I’m finding out, as I’m starting to talk about it a bit, was very reactionary and in the moment. On previous records, there was songwriting that probably took place in a working songwriter vacuum, that sat around for a number of years and found a purpose when it was time to make a record. [...] This project is much more about my current day-to-day life."

== Critical reception ==
Professional ratings
Aggregate scores
Source	Rating
Metacritic	81/100
Review scores
Source	Rating
AllMusic	4/5 stars
American Songwriter	4/5 stars
The Independent	5/5 stars
PopMatters	7/10 stars
Rolling Stone	3.5/5 stars
Slant Magazine	3/5 stars

Starting Over received generally positive reviews from critics. At Metacritic, which assigns a normalized rating out of 100 to reviews from critics, the album received an average score of 81, which indicates "universal acclaim", based on 10 reviews.

Jonathan Bernstein of Rolling Stone reports that "Starting Over feels comfortable experimenting with whatever its author throws at it" as Stapleton "digs deep into familiar territory, spinning a fiery tale of liberation", finding it a "sincere tale".

Chris Willman of Variety finds that "Starting Over is not intended to live up to its title; if anyone is so solid in his musical convictions that he could never try to reinvent himself, it's Stapleton. But it would be hard to consider an album that contains not just one but two Guy Clark covers that pay homage to one of Stapleton's songwriting heroes as banal".

Jeremy Winograd of Slant Magazine finds the arrangements of the songs "sparse and uncluttered" leaving the singer-songwriter's voice "raw". Although he finds the vocal presence of his wife Morgane a testament to the songs' authenticity, he writes that "predictably, it only shifts his focus from love and tenderness to mild hedonism" finding them "largely limited".

== Awards ==
Awards and nominations for Starting Over
Year	Award	Category	Result	Ref.
2021	Country Music Association Awards	Album of the Year	Won	
2021	Academy of Country Music Awards	Album of the Year	Won	
2022	Grammy Awards	Best Country Album	Won	

== Commercial performance ==
Starting Over debuted at number three on the US Billboard 200 selling 103,000 units in its first week.

== Track listing ==
All tracks are produced by Dave Cobb and Chris Stapleton.

Starting Over track listing
No.	Title	Writer(s)	Length
1.	"Starting Over"	Chris Stapleton; Mike Henderson	4:00
2.	"Devil Always Made Me Think Twice"	C. Stapleton; Al Anderson	3:51
3.	"Cold"	C. Stapleton; Cobb; J.T. Cure; Derek Mixon	5:09
4.	"When I'm with You"	C. Stapleton	3:43
5.	"Arkansas"	C. Stapleton; Mike Campbell	2:58
6.	"Joy of My Life"	John Fogerty	4:34
7.	"Hillbilly Blood"	C. Stapleton	4:05
8.	"Maggie's Song"	C. Stapleton	3:31
9.	"Whiskey Sunrise"	C. Stapleton; Tim Krekel	3:22
10.	"Worry B Gone"	Guy Clark; Lee Roy Parnell; Gary Nicholson	3:15
11.	"Old Friends"	G. Clark; Susanna Clark; Richard Dobson	4:01
12.	"Watch You Burn"	C. Stapleton; Campbell	4:03
13.	"You Should Probably Leave"	C. Stapleton; Ashley Gorley; Chris DuBois	3:33
14.	"Nashville, TN"	C. Stapleton; Morgane Stapleton	3:35
Total length:			54:00

== Personnel ==
Adapted from liner notes.

- Chris Stapleton − lead vocals (all tracks), background vocals (tracks 5, 7, 10), acoustic guitar (tracks 1–3, 6–8, 10, 11, 14), electric guitar (tracks 2–7, 9–13), mandolin (track 2), octophone (track 7), string arrangements (track 3)
- Dave Cobb − acoustic guitar (all tracks except 10 and 14), percussion (track 5), string arrangements (track 3)
- J.T. Cure − bass guitar (all tracks except 14), upright bass (track 14)
- Derek Mixon − drums (all tracks), percussion (track 5), tambourine (track 3)
- Morgane Stapleton − background vocals (tracks 1, 3, 4, 8, 10, 11, 13, 14), tambourine (tracks 2, 5, 10, 13)

Additional Personnel

- Benmont Tench − Hammond B-3 organ (tracks 1, 3, 6, 8, 11, 13, 14), piano (tracks 3, 8, 11), upright piano (track 5), Wurlitzer (tracks 1, 8)
- Mike Campbell − electric guitar (tracks 5, 12)
- Paul Franklin − pedal steel guitar (tracks 10, 14)
- Stephen Lamb − copyist (track 3)
- String section (track 3)
  - David Angell − violin
  - Jenny Bifano − violin
  - David Davidson − violin
  - Conni Ellisor − violin
  - Alicia Engstrom − violin
  - Mary Kathryn Vanosdale − violin
  - Karyn Winkleman − violin
  - Kevin Bates − cello
  - Austin Hoke − cello
  - Carole Rabinowitz − cello
  - Sari Reist − cello
  - Kris Wilkinson − viola, string arrangements
- Choir (track 12)
  - Traneshia Chiles
  - Tamika Harris
  - Jordan Holland
  - Lauren McClinton
  - Marqo Patton
  - Lenesha Randolph
  - Shannon Sanders
  - Melody Sheppard

== Charts ==
=== Weekly charts ===
Weekly chart performance for Starting Over
Chart (2020)	Peak position
Australian Albums (ARIA)	15
Belgian Albums (Ultratop Flanders)	92
Canadian Albums (Billboard)	2
Dutch Albums (Album Top 100)	19
German Albums (Offizielle Top 100)	61
Irish Albums (IRMA)	75
Scottish Albums (Official Charts)	18
Swedish Albums (Sverigetopplistan)	22
Swiss Albums (Schweizer Hitparade)	16
UK Albums (Official Charts)	31
UK Album Downloads (Official Charts)	6
UK Americana Albums (Official Charts)	2
UK Country Albums (Official Charts)	1
US Billboard 200	3
US Top Country Albums (Billboard)	1

=== Year-end charts ===
2021 year-end chart performance for Starting Over
Chart (2021)	Position
Canadian Albums (Billboard)	32
US Billboard 200	32
US Top Country Albums (Billboard)	4

2022 year-end chart performance for Starting Over
Chart (2022)	Position
US Billboard 200	51
US Top Country Albums (Billboard)	7

2023 year-end chart performance for Starting Over
Chart (2023)	Position
US Billboard 200	77
US Top Country Albums (Billboard)	17

2024 year-end chart performance for Starting Over
Chart (2024)	Position
Australian Country Albums (ARIA)	24
US Billboard 200	95
US Top Country Albums (Billboard)	22

2025 year-end chart performance for Starting Over
Chart (2025)	Position
US Billboard 200	115
US Top Country Albums (Billboard)	24

== Certifications ==
Certifications for Starting Over
Region	Certification	Certified units/sales
Canada (Music Canada)	Platinum	80,000^{‡}
New Zealand (RMNZ)	2× Platinum	30,000^{‡}
United States (RIAA)	3× Platinum	3,000,000^{‡}
^{‡} Sales+streaming figures based on certification alone.
