= Cold (Chris Stapleton song) =

2020 song by Chris Stapleton

Single by Chris Stapleton

from the album Starting Over
- Released: September 25, 2020
- Genre: Country-soul
- Length: 5:09
- Label: Mercury Nashville
- Songwriters: Chris Stapleton; Dave Cobb; J.T. Cure; Derek Mixon
- Producers: Dave Cobb; Chris Stapleton

Chris Stapleton singles chronology
"Starting Over" (2020)	"Cold" (2020)	"You Should Probably Leave" (2021)

“Cold” is a song by American singer-songwriter Chris Stapleton. It was released on September 25, 2020 as the second single from his fourth studio album Starting Over. At the 64th Grammy Awards, the song won the award for Best Country Song.

== Live performance ==
On November 10, 2021, Stapleton performed the song on 55th CMA Awards, on April 3, 2022, he performed on the 64th Grammy Awards.

== Charts ==
=== Weekly charts ===
Weekly chart performance for "Cold"
Chart (2020–2022)	Peak position
US Adult Alternative Airplay (Billboard)	7
US Bubbling Under Hot 100 (Billboard)	1
US Hot Country Songs (Billboard)	22

=== Year-end charts ===
2021 year-end chart performance for "Cold"
Chart (2021)	Position
US Adult Alternative Songs (Billboard)	40

2022 year-end chart performance for "Cold"
Chart (2022)	Position
US Hot Country Songs (Billboard)	94

== Certifications ==
Certifications for "Cold"
Region	Certification	Certified units/sales
Canada (Music Canada)	Platinum	80,000^{‡}
New Zealand (RMNZ)	Gold	15,000^{‡}
United States (RIAA)	2× Platinum	2,000,000^{‡}
^{‡} Sales+streaming figures based on certification alone.
