= White Horse (Chris Stapleton song) =

2023 single by Chris Stapleton

Single by Chris Stapleton

from the album Higher
- Released: July 21, 2023
- Studio: RCA Studio A (Nashville, Tennessee)
- Genre: Country rock; blues rock; hard rock
- Length: 4:27 (album version); 3:52 (radio edit)
- Label: Mercury Nashville
- Songwriters: Chris Stapleton; Dan Wilson
- Producers: Dave Cobb; Chris Stapleton; Morgane Stapleton

Chris Stapleton singles chronology
"We Don't Fight Anymore" (2023)	"White Horse" (2023)	"Think I'm in Love with You" (2024)

"White Horse" is a song by American singer-songwriter Chris Stapleton, released on July 21, 2023 as the lead single from his fifth studio album Higher. It was written by Stapleton and Dan Wilson and produced by Dave Cobb, Chris and Morgane Stapleton. The song stayed at the number two position for two weeks on the Country Airplay chart, behind Nate Smith's "World on Fire". It was nominated and won the Grammy Awards for Best Country Solo Performance and Country Song at the 66th Annual Grammy Awards. It also won Single of the Year and Song of the Year at the 58th Annual Country Music Association Awards.

== Background ==
Chris Stapleton stated via iHeart Country:

"White Horse" was a song that I wrote with my friend, Dan Wilson. We were out in Los Angeles, it was about I think probably late 2012, early 2013, and there was a movie called The Lone Ranger that was coming out, and I walked in the room to write with Dan at his house, and he said, "Hey they're looking for songs for this Lone Ranger movie." I said, "Cool. Let's write something. What do you know about it?" He goes, "Well, we don't really know anything." I was like, "Well, let's just make a song that might sound like that." And so, that's kind of where that came from, and we got to talking about how it would be cool to have a kind of rock-driven-western-themed song, and that's kind of where the song came from and we kind of built it around a guitar riff, really.

== Composition ==
"White Horse" is a blues rock-inspired country song, featuring an intro of electric guitar riffs and drumbeats. Lyrically, Stapleton tells his imaginary partner that he needs time to open his heart to her and confesses he is not ready to be the man she desires, so she must wait: "If you want a cowboy on a white horse / Ridin' off into the sunset / If that's the kinda love you wanna wait for / Hold on tight, girl, I ain't there yet". However, he also wishes this is not the situation.

== Music video ==
On November 12, 2025, Stapleton released a music video for "White Horse" featuring actor Josh Brolin, model and designer Mae McKagan, actor Tommy Martinez, and guest appearances by Stapleton and his wife and collaborator, Morgane. The video was filmed in Marfa, Texas and directed by Running Bear Films, the western-inspired video features a couple on the run from the law, with the added complexity of a parental relationship between the woman running from the law and the sheriff.

== Accolades ==
Awards and nominations for "White Horse"
Organization	Year	Category	Result
Grammy Awards	2024	Best Country Song	Won
Grammy Awards	2024	Best Country Solo Performance	Won
Country Music Association Awards	2024	Single of the Year	Won
Country Music Association Awards	2024	Song of the Year	Won
Academy of Country Music Awards	2025	Single of the Year	Nominated

== Charts ==
=== Weekly charts ===
Weekly chart performance
Chart (2023–2024)	Peak position
Australia Country Hot 50 (The Music)	6
Canada Hot 100 (Billboard)	14
Canada Country (Billboard)	1
Global 200 (Billboard)	76
New Zealand Hot Singles (RMNZ)	18
US Billboard Hot 100	12
US Adult Alternative Airplay (Billboard)	20
US Country Airplay (Billboard)	2
US Hot Country Songs (Billboard)	5

=== Year-end charts ===
Year-end chart performance
Chart (2023)	Position
US Digital Song Sales (Billboard)	43
US Hot Country Songs (Billboard)	55

Chart (2024)	Position
US Billboard Hot 100	77
US Country Airplay (Billboard)	35
US Hot Country Songs (Billboard)	23

== Certifications ==
Certifications and sales
Region	Certification	Certified units/sales
New Zealand (RMNZ)	Platinum	30,000^{‡}
United Kingdom (BPI)	Gold	400,000^{‡}
United States (RIAA)	4× Platinum	4,000,000^{‡}
^{‡} Sales+streaming figures based on certification alone.
