= From A Room: Volume 1 =

Studio album by Chris Stapleton
- Released: May 5, 2017
- Recorded: 2016–2017
- Studios: RCA Studio A (Nashville, Tennessee)
- Genres: Country; blues; roots rock; Southern rock
- Length: 32:32
- Label: Mercury Nashville
- Producers: Dave Cobb; Stapleton

Chris Stapleton chronology
Traveller (2015)	From A Room: Volume 1 (2017)	From A Room: Volume 2 (2017)

Singles from From A Room: Volume 1
- 1. "Either Way" Released: May 8, 2017; 2. "Broken Halos" Released: July 18, 2017

From A Room: Volume 1 (Note: The "A" is capitalized because it is not the English indefinite article, but a reference to the "Studio A" in which the album was recorded.) is the second studio album by American singer-songwriter Chris Stapleton, released on May 5, 2017, through Mercury Nashville. Primarily a country, blues, and roots rock record, it was produced by Dave Cobb and Stapleton.

Upon its release, the album received critical acclaim. Commercially, it debuted at number one on the Canadian Albums Chart and number two on the US Billboard 200; in the latter Stapleton scored his best sales week so far. It topped the US Country Albums chart for several weeks. In May 2023, the album was certified double platinum by the Recording Industry Association of America (RIAA). It won the award for Album of the Year at the 51st Country Music Association Awards, and Best Country Album at the 60th Grammy Awards. The song "Either Way" was released as the album's first single, followed by "Broken Halos". They won the Grammy Award for Best Country Solo Performance and Best Country Song, respectively. "Broken Halos" reached the top of the Country Airplay chart.

== Background and release ==
From A Room: Volume 1 is Stapleton's second studio album, following his solo debut with Traveller, which earned him several accolades at the Academy of Country Music, Country Music Association, and Grammy Awards, and was certified double platinum by the Recording Industry Association of America (RIAA). The release was confirmed to be followed by Volume 2 later that year.

The album takes its name from Nashville's RCA Studio A, where it was recorded during the winter of 2016–17. Volume 1 marks the second collaboration between Stapleton and producer Dave Cobb. Prior to the album announcement, Stapleton had premiered several tracks during lives performances. He premiered the album track "Second One to Know" at the 52nd Annual Academy of Country Music Awards on April 2, 2017.

The album tracks "Broken Halos", "Last Thing I Needed First Thing This Morning" and "Second One to Know" were released as promotional singles ahead of the album release. Subsequently, the album was released on May 5, 2017, to music stores and streaming services. "Either Way" was serviced to country radio stations on May 8, 2017, as the first single off the album. Stapleton performed the track "I Was Wrong" on The Tonight Show Starring Jimmy Fallon. The same month, he embarked on his All-American Road Show Tour.

== Music and themes ==
From A Room: Volume 1 focuses on country, blues and roots rock. The songs on the project were written years before his first studio album. The opening track "Broken Halos", written by Stapleton and Mike Henderson, was defined by music publications as a multi-genre song, including mid-tempo country rock, folk rock and Southern gospel. Lyrically, on the song Stapleton meditates on the wounds people suffer and the road toward healing that they travel.

The album features eight songs co-written by Stapleton and collaborators, as well as a rendition of "Last Thing I Needed, First Thing This Morning", written by Gary P. Nunn and Donna Sioux Farar and original recorded by Willie Nelson. Stapleton recorded the song as an outlaw country guitar ballad, punctuated by harmonies from his wife Morgane in the background, and accompanied by Mickey Raphael playing the harmonica.

The third album track "Second One to Know" is a country and blues rock song with rock and roll influences, featuring electric guitar riffs. In "Up to No Good Livin'", which features pedal steel guitar, the narrator, known as "the Picasso of painting the town" because of his lifestyle, worries that he may never be able to convince his lady that he has left his "wild days" behind. "Either Way", written by Stapleton, Tim James and Kendall Marvel, is as a solo acoustic ballad about the end of a relationship, telling the painful tale of a marriage nearing its end. A CMT editor opined the country blues track "Them Stems" is an answer to Traveller's "Might as Well Get Stoned" as is about "a stoner with a dire need to restock his marijuana stash." "I Was Wrong" is rooted in electric blues and Southern soul, featuring a guitar solo by Stapleton. "Without Your Love" finds the singer unable to erase the memory of an ex-partner, musically it "recalls a brooding alt-rock ballad" according to a Paste editor. Lyrically, "Death Row" contains themes of a prisoner's final thoughts, featuring cyclical guitar patterns, sparse percussion and repetitive bass – that "hints at the monotony of a life spent behind bars," according to a Rolling Stone reviewer.

== Critical reception ==
Professional ratings
Aggregate scores
Source	Rating
Metacritic	81/100
Review scores
Source	Rating
AllMusic	4/5 stars
Consequence of Sound	B
The Independent	4/5 stars
The Irish Times	4/5 stars
Paste	8.1/10
Pitchfork	7.6/10
PopMatters	8/10
Rolling Stone	4/5 stars
Spectrum Culture	4.25/5 stars
Uncut	8/10

From A Room: Volume 1 received widespread acclaim from music critics. At Metacritic, which assigns a normalized rating out of 100 to reviews from mainstream critics, the album has an average score of 81 out of 100, which indicates "universal acclaim" based on nine reviews.

Writing for Rolling Stone, Will Hermes started his album review commenting "Stapleton is a soul singer, with a preternaturally creaky voice that can turn wizened or brawny, full of pained howls and distended vowels the record", and continued describing the record as "strikingly focused, sonically and thematically. Its characters are flawed; there's much bad behavior, with heartbreak to pay." Hermes also noted its music influences, commenting, "It conjures Otis Redding as much as Waylon Jennings [...] Stapleton is a convincing bluesman. You could imagine B.B. King singing "Death Row" or Freddie King slashing through "I Was Wrong" with his jagged Texas guitar, which Stapleton impressively echoes." Also from the magazine, reviewer Robert Crawford stated it "further cements Stapleton as country's reigning outlaw." In Paste, Ben Salmon opined, "Each [track] is charming and sturdy and well put together, evidence of an artist who is at the very top of his game and ready to reach even higher." Rob Hughes in Uncut felt that the album "manages to pull off that rare trick of sounding both fresh and familiar, as dauntless as it is consoling."

In an article for The New York Times, Jon Caramanica described the album as "earthen, rich with tradition, has a tactile intensity and is carefully measured," and noted the songs' themes are "about romantic disappointment and people letting each other down, often with the Stapletons singing in devastating harmony, like on "Last Thing I Needed, First Thing This Morning" and "Up to No Good Livin'."" Joe Lynch from Billboard opined Stapleton's "earthy growl" from Traveller remains intact, and found the lyrics "sharper than before. There's plenty about boozin' and heartache, but he also tackles a prisoner's final day on earth on "Death Row" and hilariously bemoans getting to the end of his stash on "Them Stems."" Also from the publication, Kevin Rutherford, stated the album "shows Stapleton would much rather bend country radio to his will, not vice versa. "Either Way" contains one of the quintessential powerhouse vocal performances in recent memory, while "Second One to Know" is a raucous, guitar-led jaunt that isn't just a barnburner—it nukes the thing from orbit." In his review for AllMusic, Stephen Thomas Erlewine described it as a collection "of good tunes, delivered simply and soulfully," while there is not a "grand concept," the album "holds together." Glenn Gamboa from Newsday felt the album "isn’t quite the bold, all-encompassing statement" like its predecessor, however, Stapleton's "unpolished, heart-on-his-sleeve approach is bold enough to keep him at the front of the country pack."

=== Accolades ===
Accolades for From A Room: Volume 1
Publication	List	Rank	Ref.
Billboard	50 Best Albums of 2017	22	
Entertainment Weekly	The 25 Best Albums of 2017	9*	
Rolling Stone	50 Best Albums of 2017	30	
Rolling Stone	40 Best Country and Americana Albums of 2017	4	
The San Diego Union-Tribune	The Best Albums of 2017	5*	
Stereogum	The 10 Best Country Albums of 2017	6*	
Uproxx	The Best Country Albums of 2017	13	
Variety	The 20 Best Albums of 2017	no order*	
Vinyl Me, Please	The 30 Best Albums of 2017	29*	

*Along with From A Room: Volume 2

== Awards ==
Awards and nominations for From A Room: Volume 1
Year	Award	Category	Result	Ref.
2017	Country Music Association Awards	Album of the Year	Won	
2017	American Music Awards	Favorite Country Album	Nominated	
2018	Grammy Awards	Best Country Album	Won	
2018	Academy of Country Music Awards	Album of the Year	Won	
2018	iHeartRadio Music Awards	Country Album of the Year	Won	
2018	Billboard Music Awards	Top Selling Album	Nominated	
2018	Billboard Music Awards	Top Country Album	Won	

== Commercial performance ==
From A Room: Volume 1 debuted at number two on the US Billboard 200 with 219,000 album-equivalent units, of which 202,000 were pure album sales, Stapleton's highest first week sales. The album also debuted at number one on the Top Album Sales chart. It had the largest sales week for a country album in more than a year-and-a-half; the last country artist to sell more in a week was Luke Bryan with Kill the Lights (2015). With 658,000 copies sold in the US throughout 2017 (800,000 album-equivalent units), From A Room: Volume 1 was the country's sixth highest-selling album of the year, and the best-selling country album. It has sold 942,600 copies in the US as of October 2019.

In Canada, it debuted at number one on the Canadian Albums Chart. It was certified double platinum in the US and platinum in Canada. Volume 1 is the best-selling country album of 2017.

== Track listing ==
All tracks are produced by Dave Cobb and Chris Stapleton.

From A Room: Volume 1 track listing
No.	Title	Writer(s)	Length
1.	"Broken Halos"	Chris Stapleton; Mike Henderson	3:01
2.	"Last Thing I Needed, First Thing This Morning"	Gary P. Nunn; Donna Sioux Farar	4:15
3.	"Second One to Know"	Stapleton; Henderson	2:56
4.	"Up to No Good Livin'"	Stapleton; Casey Beathard	4:06
5.	"Either Way"	Stapleton; Tim James; Kendell Marvel	4:08
6.	"I Was Wrong"	Stapleton; Craig Wiseman	3:11
7.	"Without Your Love"	Stapleton; Henderson	3:51
8.	"Them Stems"	Stapleton; Jimmy Alan Stewart; Shawn Camp	3:01
9.	"Death Row"	Stapleton; Henderson	4:03
Total length:			32:32

== Personnel ==
Credits for From A Room: Volume 1 adapted from AllMusic.

Musicians

- Dave Cobb – acoustic guitar, percussion
- J.T. Cure – bass guitar, upright bass
- Derek Mixon – drums, percussion
- Mickey Raphael – harmonica
- Chris Stapleton – acoustic guitar, electric guitar, lead vocals, background vocals
- Morgane Stapleton – background vocals, tambourine
- Robby Turner – pedal steel guitar
- Michael Webb – B-3 organ, piano, Wurlitzer

Technical personnel

- Dave Cobb – producer
- Mary Hooper – design
- Gena Johnson – assistant
- Pete Lyman – mastering
- Vance Powell – engineer, mixing
- Chris Stapleton – producer
- Rachel Urquhart – illustrations

== Charts ==
=== Weekly charts ===
Weekly chart performance for From A Room: Volume 1
Chart (2017)	Peak position
Australian Albums (ARIA)	20
Belgian Albums (Ultratop Flanders)	189
Dutch Albums (Album Top 100)	79
Canadian Albums (Billboard)	1
Irish Albums (IRMA)	37
New Zealand Albums (RMNZ)	32
Scottish Albums (Official Charts)	10
Swiss Albums (Schweizer Hitparade)	29
UK Albums (Official Charts)	22
US Billboard 200	2
US Top Country Albums (Billboard)	1

=== Year-end charts ===
Year-end chart performance for From A Room: Volume 1
Chart	Year	Position
US Billboard 200	2017	28
US Top Country Albums (Billboard)	2017	2
US Billboard 200	2018	65
US Top Country Albums (Billboard)	2018	9
US Top Country Albums (Billboard)	2019	21
US Top Country Albums (Billboard)	2020	82

== Certifications ==
Certifications for From A Room: Volume 1
Region	Certification	Certified units/sales
Canada (Music Canada)	Platinum	80,000^{‡}
New Zealand (RMNZ)	Platinum	15,000^{‡}
United States (RIAA)	2× Platinum	2,000,000^{‡}
^{‡} Sales+streaming figures based on certification alone.

== Release history ==
List of release dates, showing region, edition, formats, label, and reference
Region	Date	Edition(s)	Format(s)	Label	Ref.
Various	May 5, 2017	Standard	CD; digital download; streaming	Mercury Nashville	
United States	May 5, 2017	Standard	Vinyl	Mercury Nashville	
United Kingdom	June 16, 2017	Standard	Vinyl	Decca	

== See also ==
- List of Billboard number-one Americana/folk albums
- List of Billboard number-one country albums of 2017
- List of number-one albums of 2017 (Canada)
