= Either Way (Lee Ann Womack song) =

Single by Chris Stapleton

from the album From A Room: Volume 1
- Released: May 8, 2017
- Studio: RCA Studio A (Nashville, Tennessee)
- Genre: Country
- Length: 4:08
- Label: Mercury Nashville
- Songwriters: Chris Stapleton; Tim James; Kendell Marvel
- Producers: Dave Cobb; Chris Stapleton

Chris Stapleton singles chronology
"Parachute" (2016)	"Either Way" (2017)	"Broken Halos" (2017)

"Either Way" is a song written by Chris Stapleton, Tim James and Kendell Marvel. It is the first single off Stapleton's 2017 album, From A Room: Volume 1. The song was first recorded by Lee Ann Womack on her 2008 album, Call Me Crazy. It won the award for Best Country Solo Performance at the 60th Grammy Awards.

== Content ==
"Either Way" is a country ballad performed with an acoustic guitar. Lyrically, is about the end of a relationship. Some reviewers opined in the song Stapleton offers a sparsely arranged requiem for a dormant marriage, telling the painful tale of a union nearing its end.

== Critical reception ==
For Will Hermes of Rolling Stone, the ballad is set to acoustic guitar "that goes from broken whisper to chilling holler, with extravagantly curled phrasing informed, one imagines, by hours spent watching smoke plumes rise toward the ceiling." Also in Rolling Stone, reviewer Robert Crawford wrote the studio version "doesn't differ much from that first live performance, (Note: In early 2016, Stapleton performed "Either Way" at UMG's Country Radio Seminar showcase in Nashville.) with Stapleton screaming heartbroken lyrics over acoustic guitar arpeggios. Simple and stunning."

Writing for Taste of Country, Billy Dukes commented the record "is a tremendous vocal performance that assures fans he’ll continue to be the gold standard moving forward. His guitar shadows him as Stapleton works up the scale at each thundering chorus. Contrast the power of his vocals with the dark, fragile and hopeless nature of his lyrics."

== Commercial performance ==
The song debuted on Billboard's Hot Country Songs at No. 17 as the third best-selling country song of the week, with 23,000 copies sold. After his performance on the finale of The Voice, it sold a further 21,000 copies. It has sold 87,000 copies as of June 2017.

== Live performances ==
On May 23, 2017, Stapleton performed "Either Way" on the season 12 finale of The Voice.

== Cover versions ==
Australian Judah Kelly covered the song on his debut album, Count On Me (2017).

== Charts ==
=== Weekly charts ===
Chart (2017)	Peak position
US Billboard Hot 100	89
US Country Airplay (Billboard)	26
US Hot Country Songs (Billboard)	17

=== Year-end charts ===
Chart (2017)	Position
US Hot Country Songs (Billboard)	89

== Certifications ==
Region	Certification	Certified units/sales
Canada (Music Canada)	Platinum	80,000^{‡}
United States (RIAA)	Platinum	1,000,000^{‡}
^{‡} Sales+streaming figures based on certification alone.
