= From A Room: Volume 2 =

Studio album by Chris Stapleton
- Released: December 1, 2017
- Studios: RCA Studio A (Nashville, Tennessee)
- Genres: Country; Southern rock; Southern soul; Americana
- Length: 32:23
- Label: Mercury Nashville
- Producers: Dave Cobb; Chris Stapleton

Chris Stapleton chronology
From A Room: Volume 1 (2017)	From A Room: Volume 2 (2017)	Starting Over (2020)

Singles from From A Room: Volume 2
- 1. "Millionaire" Released: October 20, 2017

From A Room: Volume 2 (Note: The "A" is capitalized because it is not the English indefinite article, but a reference to the "Studio A" in which the album was recorded.) is the third studio album by American singer-songwriter Chris Stapleton, released on December 1, 2017, through Mercury Nashville. Produced by Dave Cobb and Stapleton, the album comprises a range of music styles, including country, Southern rock and Southern soul. Commercially, it debuted at number two on the US Billboard 200. It received a nomination for Best Country Album at the 61st Annual Grammy Awards, with the single "Millionaire" being nominated for Best Country Solo Performance.

== Background ==
Stapleton released From A Room: Volume 1 in May 2017, and confirmed the release of Volume 2 for later that year. Like its predecessor, the album takes its name from Nashville's RCA Studio A, where the recording sessions took place. The album tracks "Tryin' to Untangle My Mind", "Hard Livin'" and "Midnight Train to Memphis" have been featured in his All-American Road Show Tour prior to the release. The latter song was previously recorded by his former band The SteelDrivers. The album opens with a cover of Kevin Welch's "Millionaire", and closes with a cover of Homer Banks and Lester Snell's "Friendship," previously recorded by Pops Staples. The tracks "Millionaire", "Scarecrow in the Garden" and "Tryin' to Untangle My Mind" were released as a promotional singles with the album preorder on October 20, November 4 and 17, respectively.

== Music and themes ==
"We recorded that song [while in The SteelDrivers], but I've always continued to play that song even when I'm not in that band, so it got time to be recorded again like, "Listen, I still play this song every night. We should record it." One's got a banjo on it, and the other one's got a little Bo Diddley drums underneath it. It's still the same song at its core, it's just a song I've always loved."

— Stapleton in an interview with NPR on re-recording "Midnight Train to Memphis" for the album.

A Kentucky.com music journalist stated traditional country and Southern soul "play into the record equally." For a Rolling Stone reviewer the Americana album comprises country, folk, blues, Southern rock and soul. The opening track "Millionaire" is a mid-tempo soul-influenced heartland rock ballad driven by acoustic guitar, lyrically about "spare love" and appreciating relationship closeness over material wealth, with his wife and music collaborator Morgane on background vocals. The Southern rock track "Hard Livin'" comprises phase-shifted guitar riff, with a Rolling Stone writer comparing it to Traveller's "Nobody to Blame".

Featuring Celtic-sounding verses, the ballad "Scarecrow in the Garden" tells the story of an heir of a West Virginia farm, who laments bad times not allowing him to enjoy the same prosperity of his ancestors, an immigrant family from Northern Ireland. The narrator in the bluesy rock and traditional country song "Tryin' to Untangle My Mind" confesses his past habits of drinking whiskey, dating women and spending all his little money. "Nobody's Lonely Tonight" is a slow soul ballad about looking for some comfort after giving up on love. "A Simple Song" was written with Darrell Hayes, Stapleton's father-in-law, where the narrator is heartened by his family's presence while dealing with quotidian struggle. Lyrically, "Midnight Train to Memphis" is about a person that gets to listen to the train's rumbling sound every day of his time in prison. Delivered alone, "Drunkard's Prayer" finds the singer playing the part of a broken, lonely man who wants to change and seeks for forgiveness. The cover of the song "Friendship" is a country soul track, that differs from the original for its R&B influences, "deeper" groves and guitar tremolo.

== Critical reception ==
Professional ratings
Aggregate scores
Source	Rating
Metacritic	80/100
Review scores
Source	Rating
AllMusic	4/5 stars
The A.V. Club	A−
Las Vegas Weekly	3.5/5 stars
Pitchfork	7.3/10
PopMatters	8/10
Rolling Stone	4/5 stars
Uncut	7/10

From A Room: Volume 2 received generally positive reviews from music critics. At Metacritic, which assigns a normalized rating out of 100 to reviews from mainstream critics, the album has an average score of 80 out of 100, which indicates "generally favorable reviews" based on nine reviews.

Writing for NPR, Jewly Hight noted Stapleton "chose several songs that dwell on, even savor, meaningful attachments", listing as examples "Millionaire", "A Simple Song", "Friendship" and "Scarecrow in the Garden". Compared to Volume 1, Hight opined that its emotional center "lies elsewhere." She concluded saying "folding these songs into his repertoire lends greater emotional weight to his entire body of work. Wise and sensitive storyteller that he is, he knows that deprivation and loss are felt the most deeply when it's clear what's at stake." Robert Crawford of Rolling Stone described it as "lean and live-sounding" while "Stapleton's voice remains as titanic ever, but on these nine tracks, he packs an equally sized punch as both picker and bandleader." Also from the music magazine, Will Hermes compared it to Volume 1 and opined, "the band's the same but leaner, stripped to guitars, bass, drums and Stapleton's mighty voice, with harmonies by his wife, Morgane, smartly moved up in the mix. Again, the songs feel like unearthed classics."

Reviewers from The A.V. Club opined "Stapleton's gravelly vocals sell his own openly emotive songs like no one else could," adding that he "runs the gamut of emotions and genres, traveling from the hard-rocking rumination on the difficulties of "Hard Livin'" to the minimalist blues of "Nobody's Lonely Tonight." Writing for Variety, Chris Willman called it the second-best country album of the year, only behind Stapleton's own Volume 1. Terence Cawley in The Boston Globe said the songs were "expertly crafted." Mike Davies in Folk Radio UK called "Scarecrow In The Garden" the best song in the album, followed by "Drunkard’s Prayer". Stephen M. Deusner from Pitchfork noted Volume 2 "leavens its heavier moments with songs that celebrate the simple joys of love and marriage and family, without lapsing into sentimentality." For Kentucky.com, Walter Tunis summarized his review writing "Stapleton's vivid, unvarnished musical portraits are already striking in ways that distinguish him from pretty much any of his country contemporaries." Stephen Thomas Erlewine of AllMusic said it is "a collection of moments, just like Vol. 1, but that's the charm of Vol. 2," and opined that without "crafting a major statement" the songs "work on their own terms."

=== Accolades ===
Accolades for From A Room: Volume 2
Publication	List	Rank	Ref.
Entertainment Weekly	The 25 Best Albums of 2017	9*	
The San Diego Union-Tribune	The Best Albums of 2017	5*	
Stereogum	The 10 Best Country Albums of 2017	6*	
Uproxx	The Best Albums of 2017	39	
Variety	The 20 Best Albums of 2017	no order*	
Vinyl Me, Please	The 30 Best Albums of 2017	29*	

*Along with From A Room: Volume 1

== Commercial performance ==
From A Room: Volume 2 debuted at number two on the US Billboard 200 with 125,000 album-equivalent units, of which 116,000 were in pure album sales. With Volume 1, which also opened at number 2, Stapleton is the first country act to score two top-two charting albums in a calendar year on the Billboard 200 since Luke Bryan in 2013. On the charts dated February 10, 2018, Traveller, From A Room: Volume 1, and Volume 2 held the top-three spots on Top Country Albums, making Stapleton the third artist ever to do so, the others being Garth Brooks in 1992 and Charlie Rich in 1974. It was certified Gold by the Gold in the US on June 8, 2017, and Platinum on April 26, 2018. It has sold 541,200 copies domestically as of April 2019.

== Awards ==
Awards and nominations for From A Room: Volume 2
Year	Award	Category	Result	Ref.
2018	Country Music Association Awards	Album of the Year	Nominated	
2018	SESAC Nashville Music Awards	Americana Awards	Won	
2019	Grammy Awards	Best Country Album	Nominated	

== Track listing ==
All tracks are produced by Dave Cobb and Chris Stapleton.

From A Room: Volume 2 track listing
No.	Title	Writer(s)	Length
1.	"Millionaire"	Kevin Welch	3:30
2.	"Hard Livin'"	Chris Stapleton; Kendell Marvel	2:59
3.	"Scarecrow in the Garden"	Stapleton; Brice Long; Matt Fleener; Salvatore Polimeni	3:20
4.	"Nobody's Lonely Tonight"	Stapleton; Mike Henderson	3:27
5.	"Tryin' to Untangle My Mind"	Stapleton; Jaron Boyer; Marvel	3:15
6.	"A Simple Song"	Stapleton; Darrell Hayes	3:36
7.	"Midnight Train to Memphis"	Stapleton; Henderson	3:43
8.	"Drunkard's Prayer"	Stapleton; Jameson Clark	4:08
9.	"Friendship"	Homer Banks; Lester Snell	4:25
Total length:			32:23

== Personnel ==
Credits for From A Room: Volume 2 adapted from AllMusic.

Musicians

- Dave Cobb – acoustic guitar, percussion
- J.T. Cure – bass guitar, upright bass
- Derek Mixon – drums
- Chris Stapleton – acoustic guitar, electric guitar, lead vocals
- Morgane Stapleton – background vocals, tambourine

Technical personnel

- Dave Cobb – producer
- Mary Hooper – design
- Gena Johnson – assistant
- Pete Lyman – mastering
- Vance Powell – engineer, mixing
- Chris Stapleton – producer
- Rachel Urquhart – illustrations

== Charts ==
=== Weekly charts ===
Weekly chart performance for From A Room: Volume 2
Chart (2017)	Peak position
Australian Albums (ARIA)	25
Canadian Albums (Billboard)	5
Dutch Albums (Album Top 100)	99
New Zealand Heatseeker Albums (RMNZ)	3
Scottish Albums (Official Charts)	57
Swiss Albums (Schweizer Hitparade)	62
UK Albums (Official Charts)	89
US Billboard 200	2
US Top Country Albums (Billboard)	1
US Americana/Folk Albums (Billboard)	1

=== Year-end charts ===
2018 year-end chart performance for From A Room: Volume 2
Chart (2018)	Position
US Billboard 200	60
US Top Country Albums (Billboard)	7
US Folk Albums (Billboard)	2

2019 year-end chart performance for From A Room: Volume 2
Chart (2019)	Position
US Top Country Albums (Billboard)	40
US Folk Albums (Billboard)	10

== Certifications ==
Certifications for From A Room: Volume 2
Region	Certification	Certified units/sales
Canada (Music Canada)	Platinum	80,000^{‡}
New Zealand (RMNZ)	Gold	7,500^{‡}
United States (RIAA)	Platinum	1,000,000^{‡}
^{‡} Sales+streaming figures based on certification alone.

== Release history ==
List of release dates, showing region, edition, formats, label, and reference
Region	Date	Edition(s)	Format(s)	Label	Ref.
Various	December 1, 2017	Standard	CD; digital download; streaming	Mercury Nashville	
United States	December 1, 2017	Standard	Vinyl	Mercury Nashville	
United Kingdom	December 22, 2017	Standard	Vinyl	Decca	
