= Morgane Stapleton =

American singer-songwriter

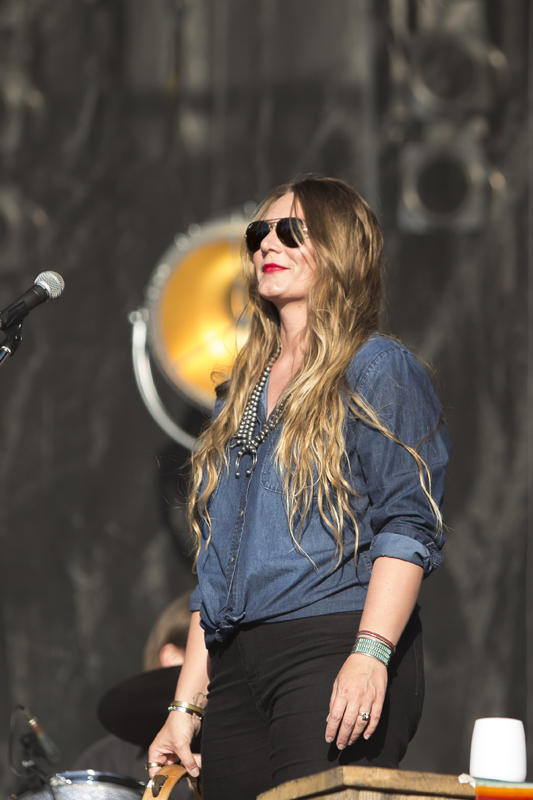
- Stapleton in 2016

Background information
- Born: Morgane Hayes; January 25, 1983 (age 43); Nashville, Tennessee, U.S.
- Genres: Country; Americana
- Occupations: Songwriter; background vocalist
- Instruments: Vocals; tambourine
- Years active: 2004–present
- Spouse: Chris Stapleton (m. 2007)

Morgane Stapleton (pronounced "Morgan"; née Hayes; born January 25, 1983) is an American singer-songwriter and the wife of Chris Stapleton. She performs background, harmony, and duet vocals in her husband's band, was instrumental in the creation of his debut album Traveller, and has contributed to all of his subsequent projects, including co-producing his fifth album Higher. A songwriter in her own right, she has written material that has been recorded by Carrie Underwood, Kellie Pickler, and LeAnn Rimes among others and also appeared as a background session vocalist on records by Underwood, Pickler, Lee Ann Womack, and Joe Nichols.

== Personal life ==
Morgane is married to singer-songwriter Chris Stapleton, whom she met while they were working at adjacent publishing houses. The Stapletons have five children: a son born in 2009, a daughter born in 2010, twin sons born in 2018, and a son born in 2019.

== Discography ==
As a featured/guest artist

| Year | Song | Artist | Album |
|---|---|---|---|
| 2014 | "The Climb" | Jessi Alexander | Down Home |
| 2016 | "Look at Us" | John Prine | For Better, or Worse |
| 2016 | "You Are My Sunshine" with Chris Stapleton | Various Artists | Southern Family |
| 2017 | "Only Blood" | Angaleena Presley | Wrangled |
| 2017 | "Amanda" with Chris Stapleton | Various Artists | Gentle Giants: The Songs of Don Williams |
| 2022 | "Don't Make Her Look Dumb" | Maddie & Tae | Through the Madness, Vol. 1 |

As a background vocalist

| Year | Song | Artist | Album |
|---|---|---|---|
| 2005 | "Don't Forget to Remember Me" | Carrie Underwood | Some Hearts |
| 2005 | "Should I Come Home (Or Should I Go Crazy)" | Joe Nichols | III |
| 2006 | "Ladies Love Country Boys" | Trace Adkins | Dangerous Man |
| 2007 | "It Ain't No Crime" | Joe Nichols | Real Things |
| 2007 | My Whiskey Years" | Joe Nichols | Real Things |
| 2007 | Let's Get Drunk and Fight" | Joe Nichols | Real Things |
| 2007 | The Difference Is Night and Day" | Joe Nichols | Real Things |
| 2007 | If I Could Only Fly" | Joe Nichols | Real Things |
| 2008 | "Solitary Thinkin'" | Lee Ann Womack | Call Me Crazy |
| 2008 | "Have You Seen That Girl" | Lee Ann Womack | Call Me Crazy |
| 2008 | "The Story of My Life" | Lee Ann Womack | Call Me Crazy |
| 2011 | "Diamonds Make Babies" | Dierks Bentley | Home |
| 2011 | "Stop Cheatin' on Me" | Kellie Pickler | 100 Proof |
| 2011 | "Where's Tammy Wynette" | Kellie Pickler | 100 Proof |
| 2011 | "Long as I Never See You Again" | Kellie Pickler | 100 Proof |
| 2011 | "Rockaway" | Kellie Pickler | 100 Proof |
| 2014 | "You Can't Trust the Weatherman" | Trisha Yearwood | PrizeFighter |
| 2015 | "Boy & a Girl Thing" | Mo Pitney | Behind This Guitar |
| 2015 | "Traveller" | Chris Stapleton | Traveller |
| 2015 | "Fire Away" | Chris Stapleton | Traveller |
| 2015 | "Tennessee Whiskey" | Chris Stapleton | Traveller |
| 2015 | "Nobody to Blame" | Chris Stapleton | Traveller |
| 2015 | "More of You" | Chris Stapleton | Traveller |
| 2015 | "When the Stars Come Out" | Chris Stapleton | Traveller |
| 2015 | "Daddy Doesn't Pray Anymore" | Chris Stapleton | Traveller |
| 2015 | "Might as Well Get Stoned" | Chris Stapleton | Traveller |
| 2017 | "Ain't Living Long Like This" | Chris Stapleton | Outlaw: Celebrating the Music of Waylon Jennings |
| 2017 | "Broken Halos" | Chris Stapleton | From A Room: Volume 1 |
| 2017 | "Last Thing I Needed First Thing This Morning" | Chris Stapleton | From A Room: Volume 1 |
| 2017 | "Them Stems" | Chris Stapleton | From A Room: Volume 1 |
| 2017 | "Up to No Good Livin'" | Chris Stapleton | From A Room: Volume 1 |
| 2017 | "Without Your Love" | Chris Stapleton | From A Room: Volume 1 |
| 2017 | "Second One to Know" | Chris Stapleton | From A Room: Volume 1 |
| 2017 | "Millionaire" | Chris Stapleton | From A Room: Volume 2 |
| 2017 | "Hard Livin'" | Chris Stapleton | From A Room: Volume 2 |
| 2017 | "Scarecrow in the Garden" | Chris Stapleton | From A Room: Volume 2 |
| 2017 | "Tryin' to Untangle My Mind" | Chris Stapleton | From A Room: Volume 2 |
| 2017 | "Simple Song" | Chris Stapleton | From A Room: Volume 2 |
| 2017 | "Friendship" | Chris Stapleton | From A Room: Volume 2 |
| 2020 | "Starting Over" | Chris Stapleton | Starting Over |
| 2020 | "When I'm with You" | Chris Stapleton | Starting Over |
| 2020 | "Arkansas" | Chris Stapleton | Starting Over |
| 2020 | "Maggie's Song" | Chris Stapleton | Starting Over |
| 2020 | "Worry B Gone" | Chris Stapleton | Starting Over |
| 2020 | "Old Friends" | Chris Stapleton | Starting Over |
| 2020 | "You Should Probably Leave" | Chris Stapleton | Starting Over |
| 2023 | "What Am I Gonna Do" | Chris Stapleton | Higher |
| 2023 | "Trust" | Chris Stapleton | Higher |
| 2023 | "It Takes a Woman" | Chris Stapleton | Higher |
| 2023 | "The Fire" | Chris Stapleton | Higher |
| 2023 | "Loving You on My Mind" | Chris Stapleton | Higher |
| 2023 | "White Horse" | Chris Stapleton | Higher |
| 2023 | "The Bottom" | Chris Stapleton | Higher |
| 2023 | "The Day I Die" | Chris Stapleton | Higher |
| 2023 | "Crosswind" | Chris Stapleton | Higher |
| 2023 | "Weight of Your World" | Chris Stapleton | Higher |

== Songwriting credits ==
| Year | Song | Artist | Album | Co-writers |
|---|---|---|---|---|
| 2004 | "Bad for the Heart" | Byron Hill | Ramblings... | Byron Hill, Darrell Hayes |
| 2004 | "Wings of Your Love" | Byron Hill | Ramblings... | Byron Hill, Darrell Hayes |
| 2005 | "Don't Forget to Remember Me" | Carrie Underwood | Some Hearts | Ashley Gorley |
| 2006 | "Down in the Valley" | Mountain Heart | Wide Open | Jess Leary, Liz Rose |
| 2006 | "Down in the Valley" | Claire Lynch | New Day | Jess Leary, Liz Rose |
| 2006 | "Cry Me a River" | Rebecca Lindsey | Headlights on the Highway | Lisa Drew, Jeremy Stover |
| 2006 | "Somewhere Else to Fall" | Alecia Nugent | A Little Girl...A Big Four-Lane | Liz Rose, Jerry Salley |
| 2007 | "We Tried" | Trisha Yearwood | Heaven, Heartache and the Power of Love | Liz Rose, Chris Stapleton |
| 2008 | "Cry Me a River" | Trinity Lane | Girls Like Fast Cars Too | Lisa Drew |
| 2008 | "I Will Someday" | Walt Wilkins | Hopewell | Liz Rose, Walt Wilkins |
| 2010 | "Liars Lie" | Lee Ann Womack | Country Strong | Sally Barris, Liz Rose |
| 2011 | "Stop Cheatin' on Me" | Kellie Pickler | 100 Proof | Liz Rose, Chris Stapleton |
| 2012 | "Talk Is Cheap" | Alan Jackson | Thirty Miles West | Guy Clark, Chris Stapleton |
| 2013 | "You Ain't Right" | LeAnn Rimes | Spitfire | Liz Rose, Chris Stapleton |
| 2013 | "Hell Bent on a Heartache" | Guy Clark | My Favorite Picture of You | Guy Clark, Chris Stapleton |
| 2014 | "Casino" | Clare Bowen and Sam Palladio | The Music of Nashville | Natalie Hemby |
| 2015 | "Talk Is Cheap" | Alan Jackson | Thirty Miles West | Guy Clark, Chris Stapleton |
| 2016 | "I Will Someday" | Curtis Wright | Curtis Wright | Garnett Bowman, Ronnie Bowman, Chris Stapleton |
| 2018 | "King for a Day" | Anderson East | Encore | Anderson East, Chris Stapleton |
| 2019 | "Ain't Got Nothin' on My Pain" | Reba McEntire | Stronger Than the Truth | Liz Rose, Chris Stapleton |

== Awards and nominations ==
| Year | Association | Category | Nominated work | Result |
|---|---|---|---|---|
| 2016 | Country Music Association Awards | Musical Event of the Year (with Chris Stapleton) | "You Are My Sunshine" | Nominated |
| 2024 | Academy of Country Music Awards | Album of the Year | Higher | Won |
