= Last Thing I Needed First Thing This Morning =

Single by Willie Nelson

from the album Always on My Mind
- B-side: "Old Fords and a Natural Stone"
- Released: October 1982
- Genre: Country
- Length: 4:22
- Label: Columbia
- Songwriter(s): Gary P. Nunn; Donna Farar
- Producer(s): Chips Moman

Willie Nelson singles chronology
"Let It Be Me" (1982)	"Last Thing I Needed First Thing This Morning" (1982)	"Little Old Fashioned Karma" (1983)

"Last Thing I Needed First Thing This Morning" is a song written by Gary P. Nunn and Donna Farar, and recorded by American country music artist Willie Nelson. It was released in October 1982 as the third single from his album Always on My Mind. The song reached number two on the Billboard Hot Country Singles chart and number one on the RPM Country Tracks chart in Canada.

American singer-songwriter Chris Stapleton featured a cover of the song on his studio album From A Room: Volume 1 (2017).

== Chart performance ==
Chart (1982–1983)	Peak position
US Hot Country Songs (Billboard)	2
Canadian RPM Country Tracks	1

== Certifications ==
Certifications for Last Thing I Needed First Thing This Morning (Chris Stapleton version)
Region	Certification	Certified units/sales
United States (RIAA)	Gold	500,000^{‡}
^{‡} Sales+streaming figures based on certification alone.
