= Broken Halos =

Single by Chris Stapleton

from the album From A Room: Volume 1
- Released: July 17, 2017
- Studio: RCA Studio A (Nashville, Tennessee)
- Genre: Country rock; folk rock; Southern gospel
- Length: 3:00
- Label: Mercury Nashville
- Songwriters: Chris Stapleton; Mike Henderson
- Producers: Dave Cobb; Chris Stapleton

Chris Stapleton singles chronology
"Either Way" (2017)	"Broken Halos" (2017)	"Say Something" (2018)

"Broken Halos" is a song recorded by American singer-songwriter Chris Stapleton. Written by Stapleton and Mike Henderson, it was released on April 14, 2017, as a promotional single from his second studio album From A Room: Volume 1. The lead track on Volume 1, it was serviced to country radio on July 17 as the album's second single. It won the awards for Best Country Song at the 60th Grammy Awards, and Single of the Year and Song of the Year and the 52nd Country Music Association Awards. Additionally, it received a nomination for Single Record of the Year at the 53rd Academy of Country Music Awards,

== Composition and lyrical interpretation ==
Musically, it was defined by critics as a multi-genre song. Stapleton said the song was inspired by "people who have passed away before their time." The singer recorded the song a day after a longtime friend died. "Broken Halos" is a mid-tempo country rock number in which Stapleton "meditates on the wounds people suffer and the road toward healing that they travel," as noted by a Los Angeles Times' reviewer. An NPR editor described it as Southern gospel, and a Rolling Stone reviewer, as folk rock. Another Rolling Stone writer, Chris Parton, named it country gospel after listening to a live performance of the song, and interpreted it as:

...[The track] offers a tender, lump-in-your-throat reminder to keep the faith, even in the midst of tragedy. Angels appear to help us on our way, Stapleton sings, but when their job is done they leave. . . and we're not meant to understand why.

The song is composed in the key of A-flat major with a moderate tempo. It primarily follows the chord pattern A♭-D♭-A♭-Fm-A♭-D♭-A♭.

== Critical reception ==
Writing for Billboard, Spotify editors opined the song "helps build a strong argument that [Stapleton] is one of the most refreshing and consistent country artists to emerge in recent memory." Laura McClellan of Taste of Country wrote "the stripped-down tune is a commentary on, essentially, stumbling along this life together as human beings, and its lyrics are poignant enough to affect even the most cynical of us." She commented its mid-tempo, "laid-back" feel with only guitar and vocals featuring prominently "makes it easy listening, but its core is significant." In Paste, Ben Salmon described it a "a perfectly paced song that lyrically spans the spiritual and the earthbound."

In Rolling Stone, Robert Crawford commented, "Equal parts folk-rock anthem and Sunday-morning spiritual, [the song] begins with five seconds of Stapleton in solo mode, howling over an acoustic guitar. When the band joins him halfway through the first verse, it's an understated entrance, stripped free of radio-friendly gloss... [The song] is a straightforward, uncluttered opener, designed to welcome – not overwhelm – the listener."

== Chart performance ==
"Broken Halos" entered the top 10 on the US Country Airplay on the chart dated February 10, 2018, becoming his second single to do so following "Nobody to Blame". It topped the chart in its March 24, 2018 issue, becoming his first career number one on Country Airplay. It also entered the top 10 on the Hot Country Songs chart in its 42nd chart week, being Stapleton's second top 10 following his two-week leading song "Tennessee Whiskey". "Broken Halos" was certified platinum by the Recording Industry Association of America on April 26, 2018, double platinum in 2019 and triple platinum in 2021. It has sold 664,000 downloads in the United States as of April 2019.

== Live performances ==
Stapleton premiered the song during Dolly Parton's Tennessee wildfires telethon in December 2016. On July 18, 2017, the singer performed it on The Today Show, along with "Tennessee Whiskey" and "Second One to Know". Stapleton also performed the song at the 2017 CMT Artists of the Year awards and at the Country Music Association Awards. The song is featured on the setlist of his All-American Road Show Tour. During his live performances in late 2017, the singer dedicated the song to the victims of deadly tragedies that happened in the country.

== Charts ==
=== Weekly charts ===
Chart (2017–2018)	Peak position
Canada Hot 100 (Billboard)	67
Canada Country (Billboard)	3
US Billboard Hot 100	45
US Country Airplay (Billboard)	1
US Hot Country Songs (Billboard)	5

=== Year-end charts ===
Chart (2017)	Position
US Hot Country Songs (Billboard)	58

Chart (2018)	Position
US Country Airplay (Billboard)	33
US Hot Country Songs (Billboard)	15

== Certifications ==
Region	Certification	Certified units/sales
Australia (ARIA)	Platinum	70,000^{‡}
Canada (Music Canada)	4× Platinum	320,000^{‡}
New Zealand (RMNZ)	2× Platinum	60,000^{‡}
United Kingdom (BPI)	Silver	200,000^{‡}
United States (RIAA)	7× Platinum	7,000,000^{‡}
^{‡} Sales+streaming figures based on certification alone.

== Awards and nominations ==
Year	Ceremony	Category	Recipient/Work	Result	Ref
2018	Country Music Association Awards	Single of the Year	Chris Stapleton - "Broken Halos"	Won	
2018	Country Music Association Awards	Song of the Year	Mike Henderson, Chris Stapleton - "Broken Halos"	Won	
