= Cole Swindell discography =

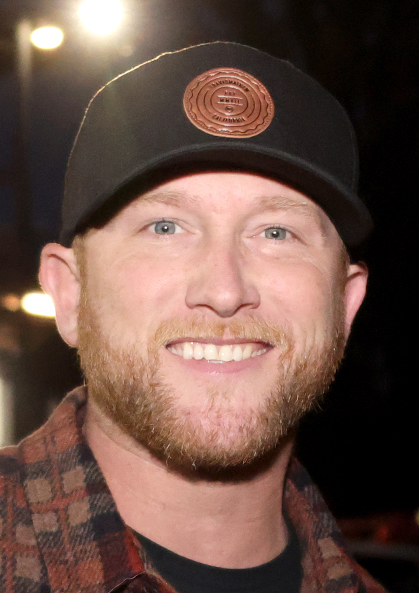
- Studio albums: 5
- EPs: 5
- Singles: 15
- Music videos: 16

American country music singer and songwriter Cole Swindell has released five studio albums, five extended plays, and fifteen singles. He has also released sixteen music videos. All five of Swindell's studio albums have been released through Warner Music Nashville: Cole Swindell in 2014, You Should Be Here in 2016, All of It in 2018, Stereotype in 2022 and Spanish Moss in 2025. His self-titled debut is also his most commercially successful album, having been certified platinum by the Recording Industry Association of America (RIAA).

All of Swindell's singles have charted on the American Billboard Hot Country Songs and Country Airplay charts, with a total of nine having reached the number one position between the two charts. These include his debut single "Chillin' It", along with "Hope You Get Lonely Tonight", "Ain't Worth the Whiskey", "You Should Be Here", "Middle of a Memory", "Love You Too Late", "Single Saturday Night", "Never Say Never", a duet with Lainey Wilson, and "She Had Me at Heads Carolina". All but two of his singles have also charted on the Billboard Hot 100, where "She Had Me at Heads Carolina" holds his highest peak at number 16.

== Studio albums ==
Title	Album details	Peak chart positions				Certifications
Title	Album details	US	US Country	AUS	CAN	Certifications
Cole Swindell	Release date: February 18, 2014; Label: Warner Nashville; Formats: CD, digital download	3	2	—	4	RIAA: Platinum
You Should Be Here	Release date: May 6, 2016; Label: Warner Nashville; Formats: CD, digital download	6	2	52	10	RIAA: Platinum
All of It	Release date: August 17, 2018; Label: Warner Nashville; Formats: CD, digital download	7	1	91	16	RIAA: Gold
Stereotype	Release date: April 8, 2022; Label: Warner Nashville; Formats: CD, digital download	48	6	—	92	RIAA: Gold
Spanish Moss	Released: June 27, 2025; Label: Warner Nashville; Formats: CD, LP, digital download	—	48	—	—	
"—" denotes albums that did not chart or was not released in the territory

== Extended plays ==
Title	EP details	Peak chart positions		
Title	EP details	US	US Country	CAN
Down Home Sessions	Release date: November 17, 2014; Label: Warner Nashville; Formats: Digital download	36	8	—
Down Home Sessions II	Release date: November 6, 2015; Label: Warner Nashville; Formats: Digital download	43	11	74
Down Home Sessions III	Release date: October 28, 2016; Label: Warner Nashville; Formats: Digital download	36	5	71
Down Home Sessions IV	Release date: November 24, 2017; Label: Warner Nashville; Formats: Digital download	—	—	—
Down Home Sessions V	Release date: October 18, 2019; Label: Warner Nashville; Formats: Digital download, streaming	—	—	—
"—" denotes releases that did not chart

== Singles ==
=== As lead artist ===
Year	Title	Peak chart positions						Certifications	Album
Year	Title	US	US Country	US Country Airplay	CAN	CAN Country	WW	Certifications	Album
2013	"Chillin' It"	28	1	2	38	5	—	RIAA: 3× Platinum; MC: Platinum	Cole Swindell
2014	"Hope You Get Lonely Tonight"	50	7	1	74	6	—	RIAA: Platinum; MC: Gold	Cole Swindell
2014	"Ain't Worth the Whiskey"	43	3	1	62	10	—	RIAA: 2× Platinum; MC: Gold	Cole Swindell
2015	"Let Me See Ya Girl"	59	9	2	99	8	—	RIAA: Platinum	Cole Swindell
2015	"You Should Be Here"	31	1	1	67	3	—	RIAA: 3× Platinum; MC: Gold	You Should Be Here
2016	"Middle of a Memory"	46	3	1	81	3	—	RIAA: 2× Platinum; MC: Gold	You Should Be Here
2017	"Flatliner" (featuring Dierks Bentley; uncredited)	56	10	2	—	4	—	RIAA: Platinum	You Should Be Here
2017	"Stay Downtown"	—	34	28	—	—	—		You Should Be Here
2018	"Break Up in the End"	49	4	2	—	34	—	RIAA: 2× Platinum; MC: Gold	All of It
2018	"Love You Too Late"	49	7	1	—	8	—	RIAA: Platinum	All of It
2020	"Single Saturday Night"	26	4	1	59	2	—	RIAA: Platinum; MC: Platinum	Stereotype (Note: "Drinkaby" is only found on the deluxe re-issue of Stereotype)
2021	"Never Say Never" (with Lainey Wilson)	27	2	1	47	1	—	RIAA: Platinum; MC: Gold	Stereotype
2022	"She Had Me at Heads Carolina"	16	3	1	24	1	81	RIAA: 3× Platinum; MC: Gold; RMNZ: Gold	Stereotype
2023	"Drinkaby"	— (Note: "Drinkaby" did not enter the Billboard Hot 100, but peaked at number three on the Bubbling Under Hot 100 chart.)	22	13	85	4	—		Stereotype
2024	"Forever to Me"	91	25	2	—	50	—		Spanish Moss
2025	"We Can Always Move On"	—	—	50	—	—	—		Spanish Moss
2025	"Make Heaven Crowded"	— (Note: "Make Heaven Crowded" did not enter the Billboard Hot 100 chart, but peaked at No. 5 on the Digital Song Sales chart.)	— (Note: "Make Heaven Crowded" did not enter the Billboard Hot Country Songs chart, but peaked at No. 1 on the Country Digital Song Sales chart.)	—	—	—	—		Non-album singles
2026	"Girl Dad"	—	—	26	—	—	—		Non-album singles
"—" denotes releases that did not chart

=== As featured artist ===
Year	Title	Peak chart positions	Album
Year	Title	US Christ.	Album
2026	"Still Do" (Anne Wilson featuring Cole Swindell)	28	Non-album single

== Other charted songs ==
Year	Title	Peak chart positions				Album
Year	Title	US Country	US Country Airplay	US Bub.	CAN	Album
2014	"Hey Y'all"	—	—	—	93	Cole Swindell
2015	"Should've Ran After You"	27	—	18	— (Note: "Should’ve Ran After You" did not enter the Billboard Canadian Hot 100, but peaked at number 49 on the Hot Canadian Digital Song Sales chart.)	Down Home Sessions II
2016	"Stars"	41	—	—	—	You Should Be Here
2016	"Remember Boys"	27	—	—	—	You Should Be Here
2016	"Broke Down"	28	—	—	—	You Should Be Here
2018	"Somebody's Been Drinkin'"	49	—	—	—	All of It
2018	"The Ones Who Got Me Here"	50	—	—	—	All of It
2018	"Reason to Drink"	48	—	—	—	All of It
2018	"Dad's Old Number"	33	—	—	—	All of It
2018	"All of It"	49	—	—	—	All of It
2022	"How Is She"	—	60	—	—	Stereotype
"—" denotes releases that did not chart

== Music videos ==
Year	Title	Director	Ref.
2013	"Chillin' It"	Michael Monaco, Shaun Silva	
2014	"Hope You Get Lonely Tonight"	Peter Zavadil	
2015	"Ain't Worth the Whiskey"	Michael Monaco	
2015	"Let Me See Ya Girl"	Michael Monaco	
2015	"You Should Be Here"	Michael Monaco	
2016	"Middle of a Memory"	Michael Monaco	
2016	"Stars"	—N/a	
2016	"Up"	—N/a	
2016	"Chevrolet DJ"	—N/a	
2017	"Flatliner" (with Dierks Bentley)	Michael Monaco	
2018	"Break Up in the End"	Jay Martin	
2018	"Somebody's Been Drinkin" (concept video)	—N/a	
2018	"The Ones Who Got Me Here" (concept video)	—N/a	
2018	"All of It"	—N/a	
2019	"Love You Too Late"	Sam Siske	
2020	"Single Saturday Night"	Michael Monaco, Eder Acevedo	
2021	"Never Say Never" (with Lainey Wilson)	Michael Monaco	
2022	"She Had Me at Heads Carolina"	Spidey Smith	
