= You Should Be Here =

You Should Be Here may refer to:

- You Should Be Here (mixtape), 2015, by Kehlani
- You Should Be Here (album), 2016, by Cole Swindell
  - "You Should Be Here" (song), its title track
