= All of It =

Studio album by Cole Swindell
- Released: August 17, 2018
- Studio: Sound Emporium (Nashville); Sound Stage (Nashville); Blackbird (Nashville); Miracle (Franklin); Sony Tree (Nashville)
- Genre: Country
- Length: 41:05
- Label: Warner Nashville
- Producer: Michael Carter

Cole Swindell chronology
Down Home Sessions IV (2017)	All of It (2018)	Stereotype (2022)

Singles from All of It
- 1. "Break Up in the End" Released: February 23, 2018; 2. "Love You Too Late" Released: November 19, 2018

All of It is the third studio album by American country music singer Cole Swindell. It was released on August 17, 2018, via Warner Bros. Records Nashville. The album includes the singles "Break Up in the End" and "Love You Too Late" as well as several songs written by Swindell, Michael Carter, and outside writers.

== Content ==
"Break Up in the End" is the album's lead single. It has charted on both the US Billboard Hot Country Songs and Country Airplay charts in advance of the album's release. The album's second single, "Love You Too Late", was released to country radio on November 19, 2018. The album features twelve songs in total, of which Swindell co-wrote five. Two other cuts, "Somebody's Been Drinkin'" and "The Ones Who Got Me Here", were also released digitally in advance of the album. To promote the album, he embarked on the headlining All of It Tour, which began in St. Louis, Missouri on the day of the album's release.

Of the album's title track, Swindell told the website Sounds Like Nashville that the song was chosen as the title track "because I think the album is full of every topic we could touch on."

== Critical reception ==
Rating it 3.5 out of 4 stars, Newsday said that the album consists of songs that are "celebrating regular life with thrilling results." He praised the lyrics of "Reason to Drink", "The Ones That Got Me Here", and "Dad's Old Number" in particular. Annie Reuter of Sounds Like Nashville also praised the songwriting, and said of the album as a whole, "Whether he wrote the song or not, his emotive singing shines through, leaving a lasting impression on the listener. And, with a proven track record at radio in selecting songs that leave an impact, All of It adds to Swindell's growing catalog of hits."

== Commercial performance ==
All of It debuted at number seven on the US Billboard 200 with 50,000 album-equivalent units, of which 39,000 were pure album sales. It is Swindell's third top 10 album. As of October 2019, the album has sold 104,500 copies in the United States.

== Track listing ==
All of It track listing
No.	Title	Writer(s)	Length
1.	"Love You Too Late"	Cole Swindell; Michael Carter; Brandon Kinney	3:25
2.	"All of It"	Bobby Pinson; Dallas Davidson; Kyle Fishman	3:39
3.	"Somebody's Been Drinkin'"	Brent Anderson; Lynn Hutton; Hunter Phelps	3:45
4.	"Sounded Good Last Night"	Carter; Shane Minor; Chase McGill; Cole Taylor	3:25
5.	"Break Up in the End"	Jon Nite; McGill; Jessie Jo Dillon	3:20
6.	"I'll Be Your Small Town"	Swindell; Taylor; McGill	3:15
7.	"The Ones Who Got Me Here"	Swindell; Ashley Gorley; Jesse Frasure	3:20
8.	"20 in a Chevy"	Swindell; Ross Copperman; Nite	3:04
9.	"Reason to Drink"	Swindell; Carter; Kinney	3:30
10.	"Her"	Matt Jenkins; Gorley; McGill; Wade Kirby; Phil O'Donnell	3:32
11.	"Both Sides of the Mississippi"	Jenkins; Ben Hayslip; J. T. Harding	3:20
12.	"Dad's Old Number"	Jessi Alexander; McGill	3:30
Total length:			41:05

== Personnel ==
Credits adapted from the album's liner notes.

=== Musicians ===
- Cole Swindell – lead vocals
- Greg Morrow – drums (tracks 1–3, 5–12)
- Miles McPherson – drums (4)
- Mike Wolofsky – bass (1, 2, 5–9)
- Mike Brignardello – bass (3, 4, 10–12)
- James Mitchell – electric guitar (1–3, 5–12)
- Pat Buchanan – electric guitar (2, 4–12)
- Michael Carter – electric guitar (1, 3, 4, 6, 7, 9–12), programming (1–3, 6–12), keyboards (2, 7, 8), piano (5)
- Billy Panda – acoustic guitar (1, 3, 5–12)
- Joel Key – acoustic guitar, ganjo (2)
- Dave Cohen – keyboards (1, 2, 4, 6–12), synthesizer (3, 5); piano, B3 (3)
- Russell Terrell – background vocals

=== Technical and visuals ===
- Michael Carter – production
- Mills Logan – recording
- Zack Pancoast – recording assistance
- Mike Stankiewicz – recording assistance
- Kam Luchterhand – recording assistance
- John Palmieri – vocal recording, overdub recording, digital editing (all tracks); drum recording (4)
- Mike Brignardello – bass recording
- Patrick Thrasher – mixing
- Adam Ayan – mastering
- Scott Johnson – production assistance
- Luke Forehand – drum recording assistance (4)
- Shane Tarleton – creative direction
- Mike Moore – art direction, design
- Joseph Llanes – photography
- Amber Lehman – styling
- Paula Turner – grooming

== Charts ==
=== Weekly charts ===
Chart (2018)	Peak position
Australian Albums (ARIA)	91
Canadian Albums (Billboard)	16
US Billboard 200	7
US Top Country Albums (Billboard)	1

=== Year-end charts ===
Chart (2018)	Position
US Top Country Albums (Billboard)	45
Chart (2019)	Position
US Top Country Albums (Billboard)	55

== Certifications ==
Region	Certification	Certified units/sales
United States (RIAA)	Gold	500,000^{‡}
^{‡} Sales+streaming figures based on certification alone.
