= Down Home Sessions II =

EP by Cole Swindell
- Released: November 13, 2015
- Recorded: 2015
- Genre: Country
- Length: 16:40
- Label: Warner Bros. Nashville
- Producer: Michael Carter

Cole Swindell chronology
Down Home Sessions (2014)	Down Home Sessions II (2015)	You Should Be Here (2016)

Down Home Sessions II is the second extended play album from American country music artist Cole Swindell. The album includes five tracks, all co-written by Swindell.

== Critical reception ==
Mark Deming of AllMusic rated the album 3.5 out of 5 stars, saying that Swindell "sings five more songs of good times, good music, beautiful women, cold beer, and broken hearts, accompanied by uptempo arrangements and polished production that bridge the gap between the worlds of country and pop." Nash Country Weekly reviewer Jon Freeman was less favorable, saying that "His music, tuneful as it is, often feels precisely calibrated for a certain lifestyle segment as if it’s a soft drink or a friendly fast food chain", ultimately giving the album a "C". In 2017, Billboard contributor Chuck Dauphin put "Should've Ran After You" at number eight on his top 10 list of Swindell's best songs.

== Track listing ==
No.	Title	Writer(s)	Length
1.	"Dangerous After Dark"	Cole Swindell; Rhett Akins; Ben Hayslip	3:17
2.	"My First Radio"	Swindell; Dallas Davidson; Ashley Gorley	3:42
3.	"Should've Ran After You"	Swindell; Brandon Kinney; Michael Carter	3:31
4.	"Shuttin' It Down"	Swindell; Rodney Clawson; Matt Dragstrem	3:10
5.	"Blue Lights"	Swindell; Gorley; Chris DeStefano	3:00

== Personnel ==
- Pat Buchanan – electric guitar
- Michael Carter – acoustic guitar, electric guitar, keyboards, programming, background vocals
- Dave Cohen – keyboards
- James Mitchell – electric guitar
- Greg Morrow – drums, percussion
- Billy Panda – acoustic guitar
- Cole Swindell – lead vocals
- Russell Terrell – background vocals
- Mike Wolofsky – bass guitar

== Charts ==
Chart (2015)	Peak position
Canadian Albums (Billboard)	74
US Billboard 200	43
US Top Country Albums (Billboard)	11
