= Flatliner (song) =

Single by Cole Swindell featuring Dierks Bentley

from the album You Should Be Here
- Released: January 23, 2017
- Recorded: 2016–17
- Genre: Country
- Length: 2:57
- Label: Warner Bros. Nashville
- Songwriters: Cole Swindell; Jaron Boyer; Matt Bronleewe
- Producer: Michael Carter

Cole Swindell singles chronology
"Middle of a Memory" (2016)	"Flatliner" (2017)	"Stay Downtown" (2017)

Dierks Bentley singles chronology
"Black" (2016)	"Flatliner" (2017)	"What the Hell Did I Say" (2017)

"Flatliner" is a song co-written by American country music artist Cole Swindell featuring vocals from Dierks Bentley. (Note: Bentley is not officially credited on the charts published by Billboard.) The song was released to radio on January 23, 2017 as the third single to Swindell's second studio album You Should Be Here. The song was written by Swindell, Jaron Boyer and Matt Bronleewe in 2012.

== Composition ==
In a sizzle reel, Swindell described the song as "about a hot girl in the club, dancing on the dance floor, making your heart stop, killing all the guys out there who are watching."

== Critical reception ==
Joseph Hudak of Rolling Stone gave a negative review of "Flatliner", criticizing it as "a hit that employs the laziest clichés of contemporary country music". He called the song "a step back for Swindell as a serious artist", compared to the maturity in the lyrics of previous releases "You Should Be Here" and "Middle of a Memory". In 2017, Billboard contributor Chuck Dauphin put "Flatliner" at number ten on his top 10 list of Swindell's best songs.

== Commercial performance ==
Flatliner first entered the US Billboard Hot Country Songs chart at number 36 on April 30, 2016 based on 14,000 copies sold when it was released as a preview track before the album You Should Be Here dropped. It only entered Billboard's Country Airplay at number 48 on chart date of January 28, 2017 when it was released as a single, and re-entered the Hot Country Songs the following week at No. 48. It reached number ten on Hot Country Songs and number two on Country Airplay in August 2017. As of September 2017, the song has sold 280,000 copies in the United States. On December 12, 2018, the single was certified platinum by the Recording Industry Association of America (RIAA) for combined sales and streaming data of over a million units in the United States.

== Music video ==
The music video was directed by Michael Monaco and premiered in March 2017. It features Cole Swindell performing with Dierks Bentley at a show in Sioux Falls, South Dakota during Dierks' 2017 What the Hell World Tour.

== Charts ==
=== Weekly charts ===
Chart (2017)	Peak position
Canada Country (Billboard)	4
US Billboard Hot 100	56
US Hot Country Songs (Billboard)	10
US Country Airplay (Billboard)	2

=== Year-end charts ===
Chart (2017)	Position
Canada Country (Billboard)	24
US Country Airplay (Billboard)	15
US Hot Country Songs (Billboard)	21

== Certifications ==
Region	Certification	Certified units/sales
United States (RIAA)	Platinum	1,000,000^{‡}
^{‡} Sales+streaming figures based on certification alone.
