= Cole Swindell (album) =

Studio album by Cole Swindell
- Released: February 18, 2014
- Recorded: 2013–14
- Genre: Country
- Length: 40:37
- Label: Warner Bros. Nashville
- Producer: Michael Carter; Jody Stevens

Cole Swindell chronology
Cole Swindell (2014)	Down Home Sessions (2014)

Singles from Cole Swindell
- 1. "Chillin' It" Released: August 19, 2013; 2. "Hope You Get Lonely Tonight" Released: March 24, 2014; 3. "Ain't Worth the Whiskey" Released: November 3, 2014; 4. "Let Me See Ya Girl" Released: April 20, 2015

Cole Swindell is the debut studio album by American country music artist Cole Swindell. It was released on February 18, 2014 via Warner Bros. Records. The album includes the number one single "Chillin' It".

== Background ==
Lead single "Chillin' It" was produced by Jody Stevens, who is the son of songwriter and producer Jeff Stevens, and formerly one-half of the duo Fast Ryde. Stevens also performed all instruments on that track. Luke Bryan's guitarist Michael Carter produced the rest of the album.

== Critical reception ==
Professional ratings
Review scores
Source	Rating
AllMusic	3/5 stars
Digital Journal	5/5 stars
Got Country Online	5/5 stars
Newsday	B
Roughstock	4/5 stars
USA Today	2.5/4 stars

The eponymously titled Cole Swindell album received generally positive reception from music critics. At USA Today, Brian Mansfield rated the album two-and-a-half stars out of four, saying that the album contains an "unhurried confidence." Stephen Thomas Erlewine of AllMusic rated the album three stars out of five, writing that the release "goes down easy even if it sometimes seems like an overblown demo tape", which "winds up pleasant enough." At Newsday, Glenn Gamboa graded the album a B, stating that the album set him up for "country stardom." Matt Bjorke of Roughstock rated the album four out of five stars, saying that the release is "easily likeable" because he has an "easy-going charm" about himself. At Digital Journal, Markos Papadatos rated the album a perfect five stars, affirming that "The songs on here are polished and infectious." Kimberly Owens of Got Country Online rated the album a perfect five stars, stating that "Cole Swindell is pure talent, whether it be with his songwriting, or his vocals."

In 2017, Billboard contributor Chuck Dauphin placed four tracks from the album on his top 10 list of Swindell's best songs: "Ain't Worth the Whiskey" at number two, "Hope You Get Lonely Tonight" at number three, "Let Me See Ya Girl" at number five and "Chillin' It" at number six.

== Commercial performance ==
Cole Swindell debuted at number three on the US Billboard 200 chart with 63,000 copies sold in its first week. With 42,000 of its sales were digital downloads, putting it at number one in the Top Digital Albums chart. On March 13, 2016, the album was certified platinum by the Recording Industry Association of America (RIAA) for combined sales and album-equivalent units of over a million units. As of November 2016, the album has sold 510,400 copies in the United States.

== Track listing ==
No.	Title	Writer(s)	Length
1.	"Hey Y'all"	Cole Swindell; Brandon Kinney; Michael Carter	2:50
2.	"Chillin' It"	Swindell; Shane Minor	3:16
3.	"Swayin'"	Rhett Akins; Chris DeStefano; Ashley Gorley	3:27
4.	"Hope You Get Lonely Tonight"	Swindell; Brian Kelley; Tyler Hubbard; Carter	3:48
5.	"Let Me See Ya Girl"	Swindell; Carter; Jody Stevens	3:08
6.	"Ain't Worth the Whiskey"	Swindell; Josh Martin; Adam Sanders	3:12
7.	"Brought to You by Beer"	Swindell; Kinney; Carter	3:11
8.	"I Just Want You"	Swindell; Carter; Luke Bryan	3:56
9.	"Get Up"	Swindell; Kinney; Jeremy Stover	2:41
10.	"A Dozen Roses and a Six-Pack"	Swindell; Sanders; Aaron Goodvin	4:30
11.	"Down Home Boys"	Swindell; Carter; Minor	2:54
12.	"The Back Roads and the Back Row"	Swindell; Carter; Tom Shapiro	3:44
Total length:			40:37

== Personnel ==
- Pat Buchanan – electric guitar, slide guitar
- Michael Carter – electric guitar, piano, background vocals
- Howard Duck – Hammond B-3 organ, piano, synthesizer
- Josh Matheny – lap steel guitar
- Shane Minor – background vocals
- James Mitchell – electric guitar
- Greg Morrow – drums, loop programming
- John Palmieri – background vocals
- Billy Panda – acoustic guitar
- Jody Stevens – banjo, bass guitar, acoustic guitar, electric guitar, keyboards, loop programming, drum programming, slide guitar, synthesizer
- Cole Swindell – lead vocals
- Russell Terrell – background vocals
- Mike Wolofsky – bass guitar

== Charts ==
=== Weekly charts ===
Chart (2014–15)	Peak position
Canadian Albums (Billboard)	4
US Billboard 200	3
US Top Country Albums (Billboard)	2

=== Year-end charts ===
Chart (2014)	Position
US Billboard 200	63
US Top Country Albums (Billboard)	11
Chart (2015)	Position
US Billboard 200	82
US Top Country Albums (Billboard)	24

=== Singles ===
Year	Single	Peak chart positions				
Year	Single	US Country	US Country Airplay	US	CAN Country	CAN
2013	"Chillin' It"	1	2	28	5	38
2014	"Hope You Get Lonely Tonight"	7	1	50	6	74
2014	"Ain't Worth the Whiskey"	3	1	43	10	62
2015	"Let Me See Ya Girl"	9	2	59	8	99

== Certifications ==
Region	Certification	Certified units/sales
United States (RIAA)	Platinum	1,000,000^{‡}
^{‡} Sales+streaming figures based on certification alone.
