= Stay Downtown =

Single by Cole Swindell

from the album You Should Be Here
- Released: September 5, 2017
- Recorded: 2016–17
- Genre: Country
- Length: 3:23
- Label: Warner Bros. Nashville
- Songwriters: Matt Dragstrem; Cole Taylor
- Producer: Michael Carter

Cole Swindell singles chronology
| "Flatliner" (2017) | "Stay Downtown" (2017) | "Break Up in the End" (2018) |

"Stay Downtown" is a song written by Matt Dragstrem and Cole Taylor and recorded by American country music artist Cole Swindell. The song was released to radio on September 5, 2017 as the fourth and final single to Swindell's second studio album You Should Be Here. It was his first single to miss the Top 10 on the Hot Country Songs and Country Airplay Charts.

== Content ==
"Stay Downtown" was written by Matt Dragstrem and Cole Taylor, thus becoming the first single in Swindell's career that he did not co-write. He said that he chose to record the song because he wanted to show support for those writers, after noticing that they had written for other artists. The song is about pleading with an-ex lover, and the conflict that he feels upon insisting that she "stay downtown" instead of visit him. Of the content, an uncredited Taste of Country article said that the song has "slick, pop-friendly production" and "relies on Swindell to play the tortured heart".

== Charts ==
| Chart (2017) | Peak position |
|---|---|
| US Hot Country Songs (Billboard) | 34 |
| US Country Airplay (Billboard) | 28 |
