= Down Home Sessions IV =

EP by Cole Swindell
- Released: November 24, 2017
- Genre: Country
- Length: 16:58
- Label: Warner Nashville
- Producer: Michael Carter

Cole Swindell chronology
Down Home Sessions III (2016)	Down Home Sessions IV (2017)	All of It (2018)

Down Home Sessions IV is the fourth EP from American country music artist Cole Swindell. The work was released on 24 November 2017 by Warner Bros.

== Content ==
In late 2017, Swindell published a music video for "Beer in the Headlights", a song originally recorded by Luke Bryan on his 2013 album Crash My Party, and Swindell's rendition of Bryan's collaboration with Florida Georgia Line, "This Is How We Roll", which he co-wrote. In addition to those two songs, Down Home Sessions IV features Swindell's renditions of three other songs that he wrote for other artists: "Roller Coaster", also cut by Bryan; "Outta My Head", recorded by Craig Campbell; and "Get Me Some of That", recorded by Thomas Rhett.

== Critical reception ==
Markos Papadatos of Digital Journal stated that Swindell's 'cover of "This is How We Roll" is infectious, and it would make country duo Florida Georgia Line proud', giving it 4.5 out of 5 stars. Cillea Houghton of Sounds Like Nashville stated that the musician "presents the songs in the stripped down, acoustic fashion they were created in".

== Track listing ==
No.	Title	Writer(s)	Length
1.	"Roller Coaster"	Swindell; Michael Carter	4:13
2.	"Get Me Some of That"	Swindell; Carter; Rhett Akins	3:11
3.	"Outta My Head"	Swindell; Carter; Brandon Kinney	3:14
4.	"This Is How We Roll"	Swindell; Luke Bryan; Tyler Hubbard; Brian Kelley	3:36
5.	"Beer in the Headlights"	Swindell; Carter; Kinney	2:44
Total length:			16:58

== Personnel ==
- Adam Cunningham - bass guitar
- Joel Hutsell - acoustic guitar, background vocals
- Scotty Sanders - dobro, pedal steel guitar
- Chris Marquart - drums, percussion
- Clint May - acoustic guitar, background vocals
- Josh Schultz - organ, piano, Wurlitzer, background vocals
- Cole Swindell - lead vocals
