= Down Home Sessions III =

EP by Cole Swindell
- Released: October 28, 2016
- Recorded: 2016
- Genre: Country
- Length: 17:14
- Label: Warner Bros. Nashville
- Producer: Michael Carter

Cole Swindell chronology
You Should Be Here (2016)	Down Home Sessions III (2016)	Down Home Sessions IV (2017)

Down Home Sessions III is the third EP from American country music artist Cole Swindell. The album includes five tracks, all co-written by Swindell.

Swindell promoted the album via a Down Home Tour. Fans who pre-ordered the album received two bonus tracks: "You've Got My Number" and "Chevrolet DJ".

== Commercial performance ==
Down Home Sessions III debuted at number 36 on the US Billboard 200 and number five on the US Top Country Albums, selling 11,000 copies in the first week.

== Track listing ==
No.	Title	Writer(s)	Length
1.	"You've Got My Number"	Cole Swindell; Ashley Gorley	3:26
2.	"Does It Hurt"	Swindell; Tom Douglas; Jaren Johnston	3:17
3.	"Six Pack Lines"	Swindell; Chris DeStefano; Brandon Kinney	3:46
4.	"Chevrolet DJ"	Swindell; Kinney; Jeremy Stover	3:43
5.	"Wildlife"	Swindell; Michael Carter; Corey Crowder	3:02
Total length:			17:14

== Personnel ==
- Pat Buchanan – electric guitar
- Michael Carter – acoustic guitar, electric guitar, keyboards
- Dave Cohen – keyboards
- James Mitchell – electric guitar
- Greg Morrow – drums, percussion
- Billy Panda – acoustic guitar
- Cole Swindell – lead vocals
- Russell Terrell – background vocals
- Mike Wolofsky – bass guitar

== Charts ==
Chart (2016)	Peak position
Canadian Albums (Billboard)	71
US Billboard 200	36
US Top Country Albums (Billboard)	5
