= Let Me See Ya Girl =

Single by Cole Swindell

from the album Cole Swindell
- Released: April 20, 2015
- Recorded: 2013–14
- Genre: Country
- Length: 3:08
- Label: Warner Bros. Nashville
- Songwriters: Cole Swindell; Michael Carter; Jody Stevens
- Producer: Michael Carter

Cole Swindell singles chronology
"Ain't Worth the Whiskey" (2014)	"Let Me See Ya Girl" (2015)	"You Should Be Here" (2015)

"Let Me See Ya Girl" is a song co-written and recorded by American country music artist Cole Swindell. It was released to country radio in April 2015 as the fourth and final single from his self-titled debut album. "Let Me See Ya Girl" reached numbers two and nine on both the Billboard Country Airplay and Hot Country Songs charts respectively. It also peaked at number 59 on the Hot 100 chart. The song was certified Platinum by the Recording Industry Association of America (RIAA), and has sold 282,000 units in the United States as of October 2015. It achieved similar chart success in Canada, peaking at number eight on the Canada Country chart and number 99 on the Canadian Hot 100. An accompanying music video for the song was directed by Michael Monaco.

== Critical reception ==
An uncredited writer from Taste of Country gave the song a positive review, saying that "Swindell isn't the rangiest singer, but this song keeps it between the lines. Lyrically he's helped write another sharp guy-meets-girl country song. The bridge is particularly colorful, and it's reminiscent of his good friend Luke Bryan." In 2017, Billboard contributor Chuck Dauphin put "Let Me See Ya Girl" at number five on his top 10 list of Swindell's best songs.

== Music video ==
The music video was directed by Michael Monaco and premiered in June 2015.

== Commercial performance ==
"Let Me See Ya Girl" peaked at number two on the Billboard Country Airplay chart dated November 14, 2015, and remained there for three weeks, and number nine on the Hot Country Songs chart date November 7, making it Swindell's first single to miss the number one spot on either chart. On the week of August 22, the song debuted at number 94 on the Hot 100 chart, peaked at number 59 the week dated November 14, and remained on the chart for eighteen weeks. As of October 2015, it has sold 282,000 copies in the United States. On August 3, 2018, the single was certified platinum by the Recording Industry Association of America (RIAA) for combined sales and streaming data of over a million units in the United States.

In Canada, the song debuted and peaked at number 99 on the Canadian Hot 100 chart dated November 28, 2015 before leaving the next week.

== Charts ==
=== Weekly charts ===
Chart (2015)	Peak position
Canada Hot 100 (Billboard)	99
Canada Country (Billboard)	8
US Billboard Hot 100	59
US Country Airplay (Billboard)	2
US Hot Country Songs (Billboard)	9

=== Year-end charts ===
Chart (2015)	Position
US Country Airplay (Billboard)	5
US Hot Country Songs (Billboard)	23

== Certifications ==
Region	Certification	Certified units/sales
United States (RIAA)	Platinum	1,000,000^{‡}
^{‡} Sales+streaming figures based on certification alone.
