= Brandon Lay =

- Born: Jackson, Tennessee, U.S.
- Origin: Nashville, Tennessee, U.S.
- Genres: Country
- Occupation(s): Singer, songwriter
- Instrument(s): Vocals, guitar
- Years active: 2016-present
- Labels: EMI

Brandon Lay is an American country music singer and songwriter. He has charted three singles on Billboard Country Airplay.

== Career ==
Brandon Lay was born in Jackson, Tennessee. He took up an interest in country music while in high school; while attending Union University, he started performing at local clubs. This led to him being signed as an opening act for artists such as Dierks Bentley, Eli Young Band, and Cole Swindell. He signed a songwriter publishing contract with Warner Chappell Music in 2013, which led to Swindell recording Lay's song "Home Game" on his album You Should Be Here. His father was a pastor. Lay said in an interview with American Songwriter that he recalled performing at a local bar called Barley's which was very close to his father's church, and he had the bar put up an abbreviation of his name on the marquee to avoid association.

In 2016, Lay signed with EMI Records Nashville, where he released his debut single "Speakers, Bleachers, and Preachers." The song was released simultaneously with a B-side titled "Let It". Taste of Country writer Billy Dukes described the former song as being inspired by Lay's life. Lay co-wrote the song with Luke Laird and Shane McAnally. The song charted for 16 weeks on Billboard's two main country music charts, Hot Country Songs and Country Airplay.

A second single, "Yada Yada Yada", followed in 2018. According to Lay, the title was "dummy lyrics" he sang into his phone when attempting to convey the melody he wanted the song to have, and the song's co-writers suggested it be left in as it fit the song's mood. Following the latter song, Lay's chart appearances led to him being signed as an opening act for Kenny Chesney. This was followed in 2020 by the single "For My Money". He wrote this song with Andrew DeRoberts, who wrote "The Weekend" for Brantley Gilbert, and it was produced by Mikey Reaves. Tom Roland of Billboard compared the story line of "For My Money" to Chesney's "Out Last Night" and Ricky Van Shelton's "Crime of Passion". Although Lay thought the song would be "too quirky", EMI selected it as a single. Two more singles, "Broke" and "Back Home", followed in 2021.

== Discography ==
Singles

Year	Single	Peak chart positions	
Year	Single	US Country	US Country Airplay
2017	"Speakers, Bleachers, and Preachers"	48	47
2018	"Yada Yada Yada"	—	42
2020	"For My Money"	—	55
2021	"Broke"	—	—
2021	"Back Home"	—	—
