= Middle of a Memory =

Single by Cole Swindell

Single by Cole Swindell

from the album You Should Be Here
- Released: May 2, 2016
- Recorded: 2015–16
- Genre: Country
- Length: 3:47
- Label: Warner Bros. Nashville
- Songwriters: Cole Swindell; Zach Crowell; Ashley Gorley
- Producer: Michael Carter

Cole Swindell singles chronology
"You Should Be Here" (2015)	"Middle of a Memory" (2016)	"Flatliner" (2017)

"Middle of a Memory" is a song co-written and recorded by American country music artist Cole Swindell. The song was released to radio on May 2, 2016 as the second single to his second studio album You Should Be Here. The song was written by Swindell, Zach Crowell and Ashley Gorley. It received positive reviews from critics praising Swindell's improvements as a storyteller. "Middle of a Memory" peaked at number one on the Billboard Country Airplay chart, giving Swindell his fifth number-one country hit overall. It also reached numbers three and 46 on both the Hot Country Songs and Hot 100 charts respectively. It was certified Platinum by the Recording Industry Association of America (RIAA), and has sold 365,000 copies as of January 2017. The song also charted in Canada, reaching number 33 on the Canada Country chart and number 98 on the Canadian Hot 100 chart. The accompanying music video for the song was directed by Michael Monaco.

== Critical reception ==
Taste of Country thought that the song showed Swindell's improved storytelling, and that he chose songs that represent the album as a whole. Similarly, Annie Reuter of Sounds Like Nashville also found that the song has a "vivid storyline" where the maturity of Swindell's songwriting "shines through." Matt Bjorke of Roughstock thought the song fit Swindell as a vocalist, and that its story of a girl who left before a man could express an interest in her is "a song most people have lived" and therefore would like to keep hearing on the radio. In 2017, Billboard contributor Chuck Dauphin put "Middle of a Memory" at number four on his top 10 list of Swindell's best songs.

== Commercial performance ==
"Middle of a Memory" debuted at number 34 on the Billboard Country Airplay chart dated May 21, 2016, and entered at number 31 on the Hot Country Songs chart a week later on the album's release date, selling 12,000 copies in its first week. It also debuted at number 99 on the Billboard Hot 100 chart for the week of August 13. Twelve weeks later, it peaked at number 46 the week of November 5, and remained on the chart for twenty weeks. As of January 2017, it has sold 365,000 copies in the US. On July 24, 2017, the song was certified platinum by the Recording Industry Association of America (RIAA) for combined sales and streaming data of over a million units in the United States.

In Canada, the track debuted at number 50 on the Canada Country chart dated August 27, 2016 and at number 98 on the Canadian Hot 100 chart for the week of November 12. It peaked at number three on the former chart dated December 2 and stayed there for twenty weeks. On the Canadian Hot 100, it peaked at number 81 for two consecutive weeks and stayed on the chart for six weeks.

== Music video ==
The music video was directed by Michael Monaco and premiered in August 2016. Danielle Maltby, a contestant from season 21 of The Bachelor and season 4 of Bachelor in Paradise appears in the video.

== Personnel ==
- Michael Carter – electric guitar, programming
- Dave Cohen – piano, synthesizer
- James Mitchell – electric guitar
- Greg Morrow – drums, percussion
- Billy Panda – acoustic guitar
- Cole Swindell – lead vocals
- Russell Terrell – background vocals
- Mike Wolofsky – bass guitar

== Charts ==
=== Weekly charts ===
Chart (2016)	Peak position
Canada Hot 100 (Billboard)	81
Canada Country (Billboard)	3
US Billboard Hot 100	46
US Country Airplay (Billboard)	1
US Hot Country Songs (Billboard)	3

=== Year end charts ===
Chart (2016)	Position
US Country Airplay (Billboard)	11
US Hot Country Songs (Billboard)	23

Chart (2017)	Position
US Hot Country Songs (Billboard)	96

== Certifications ==
Region	Certification	Certified units/sales
Canada (Music Canada)	Gold	40,000^{‡}
United States (RIAA)	2× Platinum	2,000,000^{‡}
^{‡} Sales+streaming figures based on certification alone.

== See also ==
- List of number-one country singles of 2016 (U.S.)
