= Pat Buchanan (musician) =

American guitarist

- Born: Patrick Jay Buchanan; Florida, United States
- Genres: Rock, country
- Occupation: Musician
- Instrument: Guitar
- Years active: 1986–present
- Website: patbuchananmusic.com

Patrick Jay Buchanan is an American guitarist, known for his work with the band Cameo and as a Nashville-based session musician.

== Biography ==
=== Early years ===
Buchanan grew up in Jacksonville, Lake City, and Tallahassee, Florida. His father played bass in jazz bands and his mother is a singer. Buchanan started playing guitar while in second or third grade, and played his first gig while attending fourth grade. In the mid 1980s, Buchanan began recording on radio and television jingles in Atlanta, Georgia. Buchanan worked with the band Cameo, touring and participating in the recording of their Word Up! album. He also toured with Hall and Oates and Cyndi Lauper on her A Night to Remember World Tour.

=== Session and recording ===
After being urged by producer Ed Seay, Buchanan moved to Nashville in 1994. As a session musician, he recorded with many artists, including Rodney Crowell, Dixie Chicks, Faith Hill, Kenny Chesney, Don Henley, Dolly Parton, Travis Tritt, and Amy Grant. He also recorded on film and television soundtracks, including the Nashville television series.

=== Solo career and bands ===
On Buchanan's first albums: Pat Buchanan in 2002, he co-wrote all songs with Bill DeMain. Brad Jones produced, and Greg Morrow and Jim Hoke also performed. He also released St. George in 2005.

Buchanan recorded and toured with his band the Idle Jets, with Tom Bukovac and Greg Morrow

Buchanan played in the band Swan Dive with Bill DeMain.

=== Awards ===
Buchanan won the Academy of Country Music award for Guitarist of the Year in 2005.

== Discography ==
=== Solo albums ===
- 2002: Pat Buchanan (Indiscreet)
- 2005: St. George (CD Baby)
- 2022: Slacker Bossa

=== With Cameo ===
- 1986: Word Up! (PolyGram)

=== With Hall & Oates ===
- 1988: Ooh Yeah! (Arista)

=== With Idle Jets ===
- 1999: Atomic Fireball (Not Lame)

=== With Swan Dive ===
- 2001: June (Compass)

=== Also appears on ===
==== 1986 - 1989 ====
- 1986: Bobby Brown - King of Stage (MCA)
- 1986: Peabo Bryson - Quiet Storm (Elektra)
- 1987: Wilton Felder - Love is a Rush (MCA)
- 1987: T Lavitz - From the West (Passport)
- 1988: Holly Knight - Holly Knight (Columbia)
- 1989: Tinsley Ellis - Fanning the Flames (Alligator)

==== 1990 - 1999 ====
- 1992: Dan Baird - Love Songs for the Hearing Impaired (Def American)
- 1995: Francis Dunnery - Tall Blonde Helicopter (Atlantic)
- 1995: Victoria Shaw - In Full View (Reprise)
- 1996: Corey Hart - Corey Hart (Columbia)
- 1996: Chris LeDoux - Stampede (Capitol Nashville)
- 1997: Sherrié Austin - Words (Arista Nashville)
- 1997: Beth Nielsen Chapman - Sand and Water (Reprise)
- 1997: Lynyrd Skynyrd - Twenty (SPV)
- 1998: Faith Hill - Faith (Warner Bros.)
- 1998: Jo Dee Messina - I'm Alright (Curb)
- 1998: Van Zant - Brother to Brother (SPV)
- 1999: Dixie Chicks - Fly (Monument)
- 1999: Marshall Crenshaw - #447 (Razor & Tie)
- 1999: Bruce Robison - Long Way Home From Anywhere (Lucky Dog)
- 1999: Tammy Rogers - The Speed of Love (Dead Reckoning)

==== 2000 - 2004 ====
- 2000: Chad Brock - Yes! (Warner Bros.)
- 2000: John Cowan - John Cowan (Sugar Hill)
- 2000: Billy Ray Cyrus - Southern Rain (Monument)
- 2000: Todd Snider - Happy to Be Here (Oh Boy)
- 2001: Sherrié Austin - Followin' a Feelin' (WE)
- 2001: Charlie Robison - Step Right Up (Columbia)
- 2001: Earl Scruggs - Earl Scruggs and Friends (MCA Nashville)
- 2001: Van Zant - Van Zant II (CMC)
- 2002: Beth Nielsen Chapman - Deeper Still (Sanctuary)
- 2002: Kenny Chesney - No Shoes, No Shirt, No Problems (BNA)
- 2002: Montgomery Gentry - My Town (Columbia)
- 2003: Trace Adkins - Comin' On Strong (Capitol Nashville)
- 2003: Rodney Crowell - Fate's Right Hand (Epic)
- 2003: Billy Ray Cyrus - The Other Side (Curb / Warner Bros.)
- 2003: Jessica Simpson - In This Skin (Columbia)
- 2004: Montgomery Gentry - You Do Your Thing (Columbia)

==== 2005 - 2009 ====
- 2005: Trace Adkins - Songs About Me (Capitol Records Nashville)
- 2005: Kenny Chesney - The Road and the Radio (BNA)
- 2006: Trace Adkins - Dangerous Man (Capitol Nashville)
- 2006: John Corbett - John Corbett (Funbone)
- 2006: Jon Christopher Davis - Jon Christopher Davis (Palo Duro)
- 2006: Jeff Finlin - Angels in Disguise (Rykodisc)
- 2006: Jamey Johnson - The Dollar (BNA)
- 2007: Kenny Chesney - Just Who I Am: Poets & Pirates (BNA)
- 2007: Ray Davies - Working Man's Café (V2)
- 2007: Rod Picott - Summerbirds (Welding Rod)
- 2007: Van Zant - My Kind of Country (Sony BMG)
- 2007: Gretchen Wilson - One of the Boys (Sony BMG Nashville)
- 2008: Trace Adkins - X (Capitol Nashville)
- 2008: Jessie Baylin - Firesight (Verve Forecast)
- 2008: Hayes Carll - Trouble in Mind (Lost Highway)
- 2008: Matthew Perryman Jones - Swallow the Sea (Thirty Tigers)
- 2009: Will Hoge - The Wreckage (Rykodisc)
- 2009: Jimmy Wallace - Workin' For Peanuts (BGB)

==== 2010 - 2014 ====
- 2010: Jimmy Webb - Just Across the River (E1 Music)
- 2010: Sister Hazel - Heartland Highway (Rock Ridge)
- 2011: Trace Adkins - Proud to Be Here (Show Dog Nashville)
- 2011: Alice Cooper - Welcome 2 My Nightmare (Universal)
- 2011: Kenny Rogers - The Love of God (Cracker Barrel)
- 2012: Matraca Berg - Love's Truck Stop (Proper)
- 2012: Kenny Chesney - Welcome to the Fishbowl (Columbia)
- 2012: Grace Potter and the Nocturnals - The Lion the Beast the Beat (Hollywood)
- 2012: Lionel Richie - Tuskegee (Mercury)
- 2012: Hank Williams Jr. - Old School New Rules (Bocephus)
- 2013: Trace Adkins - Love Will... (Show Dog Nashville)
- 2013: Alabama - Alabama & Friends (Show Dog)
- 2013: Luke Bryan - Spring Break... Here to Party (Capitol)
- 2013: Kenny Chesney - Life on a Rock (Columbia Nashville)
- 2013: George Ducas - 4340 (Loud Ranch)
- 2013: Tom Keifer - The Way Life Goes (Merovee)
- 2013: LoCash Cowboys - LoCash Cowboys (Average Joe's)
- 2013: Lorrie Morgan and Pam Tillis - Dos Divas (Red River)
- 2013: Joe Nichols - Crickets (Red Bow)
- 2013: Thomas Rhett - It Goes Like This (Valory)
- 2013: Kenny Rogers - You Can't Make Old Friends (Warner Bros.)
- 2013: Tate Stevens - Tate Stevens (RCA)
- 2013: Jimmy Webb - Still Within the Sound of My Voice (Entertainment One)
- 2014: Kenny Chesney - The Big Revival (BNA)
- 2014: Rodney Crowell - Tarpaper Sky (New West)
- 2014: Dolly Parton - Blue Smoke (Dolly)
- 2014: Cole Swindell - Cole Swindell (Warner Bros. Nashville)
- 2014: various artists - The Music of Nashville: Original Soundtrack Season 3, Vol. 1 (Big Machine)

==== 2015 - present ====
- 2015: Don Henley - Cass County (Capitol)
- 2015: Darius Rucker - Southern Style (Capitol Nashville(
- 2016: Lorrie Morgan - Letting Go... Slow (Shanachie)
- 2016: Cole Swindell - Down Home Sessions II (Warner Bros. Nashville)
- 2016: Aaron Lewis - Sinner (Dot)
- 2016: Jim Peterik - The Songs (World Stage)
- 2016: Cole Swindell - You Should Be Here (Warner Bros. Nashville)
- 2016: Cole Swindell - Down Home Sessions III (Warner Bros. Nashville)
- 2016: various artists - The Music of Nashville: Season 4, Vol. 2 (Big Machine)
- 2017: Joe Nichols - Never Gets Old (Red Bow)
- 2017: Gretchen Wilson - Ready to Get Rowdy (Redneck)
