= Ain't Worth the Whiskey =

Single by Cole Swindell

from the album Cole Swindell
- Released: November 3, 2014
- Recorded: 2014
- Genre: Country pop
- Length: 3:12
- Label: Warner Bros. Nashville
- Songwriters: Cole Swindell; Josh Martin; Adam Sanders
- Producer: Michael Carter

Cole Swindell singles chronology
"Hope You Get Lonely Tonight" (2014)	"Ain't Worth the Whiskey" (2014)	"Let Me See Ya Girl" (2015)

"Ain't Worth the Whiskey" is a song co-written and recorded by American country music artist Cole Swindell. It was released to country radio in November 2014 as the third single from his self-titled debut album. The song was written by Swindell, Josh Martin, and Adam Sanders. It garnered mixed reviews from critics.

"Ain't Worth the Whiskey" peaked at number one on the Billboard Country Airplay chart, giving Swindell his third number-one country hit overall, making him the first male country artist since Darius Rucker in 2009 to send their first three singles to number one. It also charted at numbers three and 43 on the Hot Country Songs and Hot 100 charts respectively. The song was certified platinum by the Recording Industry Association of America (RIAA), and has sold 688,000 copies in that country as of June 2015. The song also charted in Canada at number ten on the Country chart and number 62 on the Canadian Hot 100. It was also certified Gold by Music Canada, denoting sales of over 40,000 units in that country.

The accompanying music video was directed by Michael Monaco and features Swindell at a bar giving tribute to a returning U.S. Special Forces soldier from Afghanistan.

== Critical reception ==
Vickye Fisher of For The Country Record gave the song a negative review, criticizing the production and lyrics as well as Swindell's vocals, saying that "Unfortunately, the genuineness that they're going for with this one falls pretty flat. Along with having a very conventional, generic country/pop sound (like 'Lonely') that I find it very difficult to get remotely excited about, it sits in a cheery major key complete with perfect cadences and a feel-good vibe, meaning that any sadness or heartache that might have been conveyed through the lyrics gets completely overthrown."

Taste of Country reviewed it positively which stated that "Ultimately, 'Ain't Worth the Whiskey' is a strong choice for Swindell's third single off his self-titled debut album. It's fun to listen to and everything we love about country music. And who doesn't love a classic tune about moving on … with a good shot of whiskey, of course." In 2017, Billboard contributor Chuck Dauphin put "Ain't Worth the Whiskey" at number two on his top 10 list of Swindell's best songs.

== Music video ==
The music video was directed by Michael Monaco and premiered in March 2015. Taking place in Nashville at the Silver Dollar Saloon, the video starts out with Swindell entering said bar with a blonde woman, presumed to be his ex, spotting him. Midway through the video, Swindell goes on stage to announce that Kyle Davis, a U.S. Special Forces soldier, has returned from Afghanistan and gives a salute to him by toasting a glass of alcohol.

== Commercial performance ==
Ain't Worth the Whiskey first entered the Hot Country Songs chart at number 27 on the album release in February 2014, as well as Bubbling Under Hot 100 chart at number 2, and number 6 on the Country Digital Songs, selling 34,000 copies for the week. In anticipation of the song release as a single, the song entered the Country Airplay chart at number 59 for chart dated October 25, 2014. With increasing airplay, the song eventually debuted on the Billboard Hot 100 for chart dated January 17, 2015. It peaked at number one on the Country Airplay chart and on the Hot 100 at number 43 on the chart date of April 4, 2015. As of June 2015, the single has sold 688,000 copies in the United States. On August 31, 2015, the single was certified platinum by the Recording Industry Association of America (RIAA) for sales of over a million digital copies in the United States.

== Charts ==
=== Weekly charts ===
Chart (2014–2015)	Peak position
Canada Hot 100 (Billboard)	62
Canada Country (Billboard)	10
US Billboard Hot 100	43
US Country Airplay (Billboard)	1
US Hot Country Songs (Billboard)	3

=== Year-end charts ===
Chart (2015)	Position
US Country Airplay (Billboard)	41
US Hot Country Songs (Billboard)	34

== Certifications ==
Region	Certification	Certified units/sales
Canada (Music Canada)	Gold	40,000^{*}
United States (RIAA)	2× Platinum	2,000,000^{‡}
^{*} Sales figures based on certification alone.^{‡} Sales+streaming figures based on certification alone.
