= Greg Morrow =

American drummer

- Born: Ripley, Tennessee
- Genres: Rock, country
- Occupation: Musician
- Instruments: Drums, vocals
- Years active: 1982–present

Greg Morrow is an American drummer, percussionist, session musician, mixing engineer, and vocalist.

== Biography ==
Morrow was born in Ripley, Tennessee and raised in Memphis. At age 11, Morrow and his band performed on a local TV show, and he participated in his first recording session.

While working as a teen at the Drum Stand, Morrow's mentor was Dave Patrick, who taught him about drums and drum construction.

In the 1980s, Morrow toured and recorded with the Christian ensemble DeGarmo and Key. Morrow then was a part of Amy Grant's touring band.

Morrow moved from Memphis in 1996 after encouragement from Norbert Putnam and Chad Cromwell.

Morrow is a member of Big Al Anderson’s band The World Famous Headliners, along with Shawn Camp, Pat McLaughlin, and Michael Rhodes.

Morrow has performed and recorded with Blake Shelton, Don Henley, Joe Bonamassa, Billy Gibbons, Bob Seger, Luke Bryan, the Dixie Chicks, Kacey Musgraves, Steve Earle, Gretchen Wilson and others.

=== Awards ===
In 2008 and 2015, Morrow won the Academy of Country Music Studio Recording Award for Drummer of the Year.

== Discography ==
With DeGarmo and Key

- 1982: No Turning Back: Live (Lamb & Lion)
- 1993: Mission of Mercy (Power Discs)
- 1984: Communication (Power Discs)
- 1985: Commander Sozo and the Charge of the Light Brigade (Power Discs)
- 1986: "Streetlight" Power Discs)
- 1987: D & K (Power Discs)
- 1988: Rock Solid: Absolutely Live (Power Discs)

With Amy Grant

- 1981: In Concert (Myrrh / A&M)
- 1981: In Concert Volume Two (Myrrh / Word)
- 1989: A Moment in Time (Tretorn) with Michael W. Smith and Gary Chapman

=== Also appears on ===
==== 1990–1994 ====
- 1990: Dreams So Real – Gloryline (Arista)
- 1991: Deborah Conway – String of Pearls (Mushroom)
- 1992: Toy Caldwell – Toy Caldwell (Cabin Fever)
- 1993: Don Nix – Back to the Well (Appaloosa)
- 1994: David Lynn Jones – Play by Ear (Liberty)
- 1994: Sonny Landreth – Exit 103A EP (Zoo)
- 1994: Barbara Lynn – So Good (Bullseye Blue
- 1994: Primal Scream – Give Out But Don't Give Up (Creation)

==== 1995–1996 ====
- 1995: Deana Carter – Did I Shave My Legs for This? (Capitol Nashville)
- 1995: Francis Dunnery – Tall Blonde Helicopter (Atlantic)
- 1995: Dana Key – Part of the Mystery (ForeFront)
- 1995: Sonny Landreth – South of I-10 (Zoo / Praxis)
- 1995: Billy Pilgrim – Bloom (Atlantic)
- 1996: Bad Company – Stories Told & Untold (EastWest)
- 1996: Steve Earle – I Feel Alright (Warner Bros.)
- 1996: LeAnn Rimes – Blue (Curb)
- 1996: Tony Spinner – Crosstown Sessions (Blues Bureau)

==== 1997–1998 ====
- 1997: 38 Special – Resolution (Razor & Tie)
- 1997: The Cicadas – The Cicadas (Warner Bros.)
- 1997: David Allan Coe – LIVE: If That Ain't Country... (Columbia)
- 1997: Leo Kottke – Standing in My Shoes (Private Music)
- 1997: RB Morris – ...Take That Ride... (Oh Boy)
- 1997: LeAnn Rimes – You Light Up My Life: Inspirational Songs (Curb)
- 1998: Toy Caldwell – Can't You See (Pet Rock)
- 1998: Deana Carter – Everything's Gonna Be Alright (Capitol Nashville)
- 1998: Dixie Chicks – Wide Open Spaces (Monument)
- 1998: Allison Moorer – Alabama Song (MCA Nashville)
- 1998: Suzy Ragsdale – Future Past (VNS)
- 1998: LeAnn Rimes – Sittin' on Top of the World (Curb)
- 1998: Van Zant – Brother to Brother (CMC International)
- 1998: Marie Wilson – Real Life (Atlantic)

==== 1999–2000 ====
- 1999: Trace Adkins – More... (Capitol Nashville)
- 1999: Dixie Chicks – Fly (Monument)
- 1999: Steve Forbert – Evergreen Boy (Koch)
- 1999: John Jorgenson – Emotional Savant (J2)
- 1999: Lace – Lace (Warner Bros.)
- 1999: The Warren Brothers – Beautiful Day in the Cold Cruel World (BMG / Ariola)
- 1999: Hank Williams III – Risin' Outlaw (Curb)
- 2000: Alabama – When It All Goes South (RCA)
- 2000: Eddy Raven – Living in Black and White (RMG)
- 2000: John Wesley Harding – The Confessions of St. Ace (Mammoth)
- 2000: Trisha Yearwood – Real Live Woman (MCA Nashville)

==== 2001–2003 ====
- 2001: Billy Gilman – Dare to Dream (Epic)
- 2001: Chris Knight – A Pretty Good Guy (Dualtone)
- 2001: Scott Miller and the Commonwealth – Thus Always to Tyrants (Sugar Hill)
- 2001: Earl Scruggs – Earl Scruggs and Friends (MCA Nashville)
- 2002: Montgomery Gentry – My Town (Columbia)
- 2003: Trace Adkins – Comin' On Strong (Capitol Nashville)
- 2003: Rodney Crowell – Fate's Right Hand (Epic)
- 2003: Billy Ray Cyrus – The Other Side (Warner Bros.)
- 2003: Chris Knight – The Jealous Kind (Dualtone)
- 2003: Lynyrd Skynyrd – Vicious Cycle (Sanctuary)
- 2003: Blake Shelton – The Dreamer (Warner Bros. Nashville)

==== 2004–2006 ====
- 2004: 38 Special – Drivetrain (Sanctuary)
- 2004: Peter Cetera – You Just Gotta Love Christmas (Viastar)
- 2004: Montgomery Gentry – You Do Your Thing (Columbia)
- 2004: Andy Griggs – This I Gotta See (RCA)
- 2004: Carolyn Dawn Johnson – Dress Rehearsal (Arista Nashville)
- 2004: Jason Ringenberg – Empire Builders (Bittersweet)
- 2004: Sugarland – Twice the Speed of Life (Mercury)
- 2004: Gretchen Wilson – Here for the Party (Epic)
- 2005: Trace Adkins – Songs About Me (Capitol Nashville)
- 2005: Brooks & Dunn – Hillbilly Deluxe (Arista Nashville)
- 2005: Kim Carnes – Chasin' Wild Trains (Corazong)
- 2005: Van Zant – Get Right with the Man (Columbia)
- 2005: 4Him – Encore..For Future Generations (INO Records/Epic Records)
- 2006: Trace Adkins – Dangerous Man (Capitol Nashville)
- 2006: Carolina Rain – Weather the Storm (Equity Music Group)
- 2006: Jon Christopher Davis – Jon Christopher Davis (Palo Duro)
- 2006: Sugarland – Enjoy the Ride (Mercury)

==== 2007–2010 ====
- 2007: John Anderson – Easy Money (Warner Bros.)
- 2007: Brooks & Dunn – Cowboy Town (Arista Nashville)
- 2007: Halfway to Hazard – Halfway to Hazard (StyleSonic)
- 2007: Ty Herndon – Right About Now (Pyramid)
- 2007: Van Zant – My Kind of Country (Sony BMG)
- 2007: Trisha Yearwood – Heaven, Heartache and the Power of Love (Big Machine)
- 2008: Trace Adkins – X (Capitol Nashville)
- 2008: Catherine Britt – Little Wildflower (ABC Music)
- 2008: Chris Cagle – My Life's Been a Country Song (Capitol Nashville)
- 2008: Darius Rucker – Learn to Live (Capitol Nashville)
- 2008: Sugarland – Love on the Inside (Mercury)
- 2009: Luke Bryan – Doin' My Thing (Capitol Nashville)
- 2009: Steve Earle – Townes (New West)
- 2009: Lynyrd Skynyrd – God & Guns (Roadrunner)
- 2010: Trace Adkins – Cowboy's Back in Town (Show Dog-Universal)
- 2010: Trailer Choir – Tailgate (Show Dog-Universal)
- 2010: Jimmy Webb – Just Across the River (Victor)
- 2010: Amy Grant – Somewhere Down the Road (EMI CMG/Sparrow Records)

==== 2011–2014 ====
- 2011: Trace Adkins – Proud to Be Here (Show Dog Nashville)
- 2011: Matraca Berg – The Dreaming Fields (Dualton
- 2011: Luke Bryan – Tailgates & Tanlines (Capitol Nashville)
- 2011: Sara Evans – Stronger (Sony Music)
- 2011: Kellie Pickler – 100 Proof (BNA)
- 2012: Big & Rich – Hillbilly Jedi (Warner Bros. Nashville)
- 2012: Kix Brooks – New to This Town (Arista Nashville)
- 2012: Lynyrd Skynyrd – Last of a Dyin' Breed (Roadrunner)
- 2012: Hank Williams Jr. – Old School New Rules (Bocephus)
- 2013: Danielle Bradbery – Danielle Bradbery (Republic Nashville)
- 2013: Sheryl Crow – Feels Like Home (Warner Bros.)
- 2013: Sara Evans – Slow Me Down (RCA)
- 2013: John Fogerty – Wrote a Song for Everyone (Vanguard)
- 2013: Vince Gill and Paul Franklin – Bakersfield (MCA Nashville)
- 2013: Tom Keifer – The Way Life Goes (Merovee)
- 2013: Neal McCoy – Pride: A Tribute to Charley Pride (Slate Creek)
- 2013: Ashley Monroe – Like a Rose (Warner Bros. Nashville)
- 2013: Kellie Pickler – The Woman I Am (Black River Entertainment)
- 2013: Kenny Rogers – You Can't Make Old Friends (Warner Bros.)
- 2013: Blake Shelton – Based on a True Story... (Warner Bros.)
- 2013: Tate Stevens – Tate Stevens (RCA)
- 2013: Steve Wariner – It Ain't All Bad (SelecTone Records)
- 2013: Amy Grant – How Mercy Looks from Here (EMI CMG/Sparrow)

==== 2014–2015 ====
- 2014: Alabama – Angels Among Us: Hymns and Gospel Favorites (Universal)
- 2014: Jimmy Barnes – 30:30 Hindsight (Mushroom)
- 2014: Big & Rich – Gravity (B$R)
- 2014: Garth Brooks – Man Against Machine (RCA)
- 2014: Jerrod Niemann – High Noon (Sea Gayle)
- 2014: John Oates – Good Road to Follow (Elektra Nashville)
- 2014: Eric Paslay – Eric Paslay (EMI Nashville)
- 2014: Dolly Parton – Blue Smoke (Dolly / Masterworks)
- 2014: Cole Swindell – Cole Swindell (Warner Bros.)
- 2014: The Waterboys – Modern Blues (Harlequin And Clown)
- 2014: Eli Young Band – 10,000 Towns (Big Machine)
- 2015: Alabama – Southern Drawl (BMG)
- 2015: Jim Ed Brown – In Style Again (Plowboy)
- 2015: Luke Bryan – Kill the Lights (Capitol / Decca)
- 2015: The Cox Family – Gone Like the Cotton (Rounder)
- 2015: Billy Gibbons and the BFG's – Perfectamundo (Concord)
- 2015: Don Henley – Cass County (Capitol)
- 2015: Reba McEntire – Love Somebody (Starstruck / Nash Icon)
- 2015: Darius Rucker – Southern Style (Capitol Nashville)
- 2015: George Strait – Cold Beer Conversation (MCA Nashville)

==== 2016 – present ====
- 2016: Joe Bonamassa – Blues of Desperation (J&R Adventures)
- 2016: Kenny Chesney – Cosmic Hallelujah (Blue Chair / Columbia)
- 2016: Amy Grant – Tennessee Christmas (Universal)
- 2016: Amy Holland – Light on My Path (Chonin)
- 2016: Cyndi Lauper – Detour (Sire)
- 2016: Midland – Midland EP (Big Machine)
- 2016: Mo Pitney – Behind This Guitar (Curb)
- 2016: Joanne Shaw Taylor – Wild (Axehouse Music)
- 2016: Cole Swindell – Down Home Sessions II EP (Warner Bros.)
- 2016: Cole Swindell – Down Home Sessions III EP (Warner Bros.)
- 2016: Cole Swindell – You Should Be Here (Warner Bros.)
- 2017: Reba McEntire – Sing It Now: Songs of Faith & Hope (Nash Icon)
- 2017: Jerrod Niemann – This Ride (Curb)
- 2017: Leon Russell – On a Distant Shore (Sony)
- 2017: Selah – Unbreakable (Curb)
- 2017: Gretchen Wilson – Ready To Get Rowdy (Redneck)
