= Weather the Storm =

Studio album by Carolina Rain
- Released: September 19, 2006
- Studio: Black Lab Studios; Starstruck Studios; County Q Studios; Blackbird Studios
- Genre: Country
- Length: 46:27
- Label: Equity
- Producer: Clint Black; Carolina Rain; Stephony Smith; Rhean Boyer; Justin Niebank

Singles from Weather the Storm
- 1. "Isn't She" Released: December 11, 2006

Weather the Storm is the only studio album by American country music trio Carolina Rain. It was released on September 19, 2006, via Equity Music Group. The album features the singles "I Ain't Scared", "Get Outta My Way", and "Isn't She".

== Content ==
The album's first single, "I Ain't Scared", charted on Hot Country Songs in 2004. Another single, "Let's Get It On", charted in 2005, but did not make the final cut of the album. "Get Outta My Way" and "Isn't She" were both issued in 2006. Clint Black, who owned the Equity Music Group label at the time, produced some of the tracks and provided percussion accompaniment. Other producers on the album included Stephony Smith, Justin Niebank, and the band itself.

== Critical reception ==
Professional ratings
Review scores
Source	Rating
Allmusic	3.5/5 stars
Country Standard Time	positive
Arizona Daily Star	positive

Jeff Tamarkin of Allmusic rated the album 3.5 out of 5 stars, praising the prominence of vocal harmony, fiddle, and banjo in the production. Dave Bagdade of Country Standard Time gave the album a positive review, calling the songs "well-constructed" while also noting the prominence of vocal harmony and describing the instrumental arrangements with favor. Cathalena E. Burch of the Arizona Daily Star was also positive toward the band's sound, writing that the album "arrives with a warm and fuzzy feeling of familiarity. But just when you've accepted that this is a band like so many that came before it, Carolina Rain drops in something old that sounds new."

== Track listing ==
No.	Title	Writer(s)	Length
1.	"Carolina Rain"	Stephony Smith, Gary Loyd, Rhean Boyer, Jeremy Baxter, Marvin Evatt	3:37
2.	"Isn't She"	Phillip Douglas, Ron Harbin, Boyer	3:41
3.	"Get Outta My Way"	Robert Ellis Orrall, Curtis Wright	2:54
4.	"Dealin'"	Rand Bishop, Boyer	4:24
5.	"I Ain't Scared"	Smith, Loyd, Boyer	3:32
6.	"How It Should Be"	Chuck Allen Floyd, Boyer	4:20
7.	"All Before the Sun Goes Down"	Don Ellis, Billy Montana, Boyer	3:32
8.	"Someone's Child"	Tommy Conners, Boyer	4:16
9.	"That's Alright with Me"	Smith, Loyd, Boyer	3:42
10.	"The Man I've Been Looking For"	Smith, Loyd, Boyer	4:15
11.	"Sweet Virginia Kiss"	Orrall, Jeff Coplan, Boyer	3:52
12.	"Who Needs the Sun"	Boyer	4:22

== Personnel ==
Adapted from liner notes.

Carolina Rain

- Rhean Boyer - lead vocals, acoustic guitar, resonator guitar
- Marvin Evatt - low harmony vocals, banjo
- Jeremy Baxter - high harmony vocals, mandolin

Additional musicians

- Clint Black - percussion (1–4, 11, 12)
- Steve Brewster - drums (tracks 1–4, 11, 12)
- Mike Brignardello - bass guitar (8)
- Chad Cromwell - drums (6)
- J. T. Corenflos - electric guitar (all tracks)
- Eric Darken - percussion (6, 7, 9, 10)
- Dan Dugmore - steel guitar, mandolin (5, 6, 7, 9, 10)
- Kevin Grantt - bass guitar (1, 3, 4, 11, 12)
- Kenny Greenberg - electric guitar (7, 9, 10)
- Anthony Harrell - Hammond B-3 organ (8)
- Steve Hinson - steel guitar (8)
- Mike Johnson - steel guitar (1–4, 11, 12)
- Kevin Key - bass guitar (2)
- Chris McHugh - drums (5)
- Greg Morrow - drums (tracks 7, 9, 10)
- Billy Panda - acoustic guitar (8)
- Larry Paxton - bass guitar (5, 6, 7, 9, 10)
- Steve Sheehan - acoustic guitar, ganjo, resonator guitar (all tracks except 8)
- Steve Turner - drums (8)
- Wanda Vick - mandolin (5)

Technical

- Clint Black - producer (1–4, 11, 12)
- Rhean Boyer - producer (8)
- Carolina Rain - producer (1–4, 6, 11, 12)
- Ricky Cobble - recording
- P. T. Houston - recording
- David Leonard - mnixing
- Mills Logan - recording, mixing
- Ken Love - mastering
- Justin Niebank - producer (6), recording
- Stephony Smith - producer (5, 7, 9, 10)

== Chart performance ==
Chart (2006)	Peak position
US Top Country Albums (Billboard)	60
