= Spanish Moss =

Studio album by Cole Swindell
- Released: June 27, 2025
- Studios: Yoda's Palace Studio (Nashville, Tennessee)
- Genre: Country
- Length: 65:27
- Label: Warner Nashville
- Producers: Will Bundy; Zach Crowell; Devin Dawson; Matt Dragstrem; Jacob Durrett; Kyle Fishman; Jesse Frasure; Greylan James; Jimmy Robbins; Jordan Schmidt

Cole Swindell chronology
Stereotype (2022)	Spanish Moss (2025)

Singles from Spanish Moss
- 1. "Forever to Me" Released: April 12, 2024; 2. "We Can Always Move On" Released: June 2, 2025

Spanish Moss is the fifth studio album by American country music artist Cole Swindell. The album was released on June 27, 2025, via Warner Nashville. The album featured 45 different songwriters and was co-produced by Will Bundy, Zach Crowell, Devin Dawson, Matt Dragstrem, Jacob Durrett, Kyle Fishman, Jesse Frasure, Greylan James, Jimmy Robbins, Jordan Schmidt.

== Background ==
Following the success of Swindell's 2022 album Stereotype, he began work on Spanish Moss. The title of the album was inspired by a golf trip in the 30A region of Florida, when co-writer Jordan Minton asked Swindell what the material hanging from trees was. The phrase "Spanish moss" sparked a memory of Swindell's late father, who once left moss hanging from his truck's gas cap after a visit to Savannah, Georgia. Though the title track ultimately became a love song, the moment helped shape the album's name and concept. A photograph taken by Minton of the moss that day was used as the album's cover.

Swindell stated that the project had been "a work in progress for over two years," adding that it was challenging to follow up Stereotype's success. "Life changed a lot for me in the best way since the last project," he said, referring to his 2024 wedding to his longtime girlfriend and their upcoming first child. During that time, Swindell briefly stepped away from music to focus on his personal life before returning to complete the project.

The album was officially announced in early 2025 and released on June 27, 2025. "Forever to Me" was the first single from the record, reaching number two on Billboard's Country Airplay. A second promotional single, the title track, was released on March 28, 2025. "We Can Always Move On" was released as the album's second single.

== Critical reception ==
Professional ratings
Review scores
Source	Rating
Country Central	4.8/10
Entertainment Focus	3/5 stars

Critics gave Spanish Moss a mixed reception, praising its authenticity and standout moments while criticizing its length and thematic repetition. While tracks like "Forever to Me," "Dale Jr.," "Dirty Dancing," and "Happy Hour Sad" were highlighted for their emotional depth and creative flair, others, such as "'99 Problems" and "One Day" were seen as filler. James Daykin of Entertainment Focus noted that "trimmed down by five or six tracks, this could have been Swindell's most personal and potent project yet."

Creed Miller of Country Central also critiqued the album's length, calling it bloated and occasionally dull. He described it as "a grind to listen to... not bad enough to hate, but not good enough to remember."

== Track listing ==
Spanish Moss track listing
No.	Title	Writer(s)	Producer(s)	Length
1.	"Kill a Prayer"	Jesse Frasure; Cole Taylor; Josh Thompson	Frasure	3:06
2.	"Dirty Dancing"	Beau Bailey; Hunter Phelps; Ned Cameron	Jordan Schmidt	3:49
3.	"Dale Jr."	Matt Alderman; Greylan James; Cole Swindell	Will Bundy	3:35
4.	"Spanish Moss"	Devin Dawson; Jordan Minton; Jordan Reynolds; Swindell	Dawson; Jacob Durrett; Reynolds	3:35
5.	"We Can Always Move On"	Thomas Archer; Kyle Fishman; Michael Tyler	Fishman; Jimmy Robbins	3:19
6.	"Georgia (Ain't On Her Mind)"	John Byron; Ben Johnson; Swindell	Zach Crowell	2:47
7.	"Lost Heart"	Rodney Clawson; Zach Kale; Tawgs Salter; Nolen Sipe	Crowell	2:42
8.	"Bottom of It"	Chase McGill; Ben Simonetti; Jonathan Singleton; Swindell	Bundy	2:54
9.	"Left to Get Right"	Archer; Rocky Block; James	Bundy	3:01
10.	"Longneck List"	Lindsay Rimes; Jameson Rodgers; Matt Rogers	Bundy	3:03
11.	"Country Boy Can't Survive"	Jared Keim; Josh Osborne; Swindell; Travis Wood	Bundy	3:03
12.	"Happy Hour Sad"	Micah Carpenter; Robbins; Lydia Vaughan; Wood	Robbins	2:43
13.	"Wild"	Matt Dragstrem; Minton; Rogers; Swindell	Dragstrem	2:50
14.	"One Day"	McGill; Schmidt; Ernest Keith Smith	Crowell	2:51
15.	"Forever to Me"	Block; James; Swindell	James; Schmidt	2:59
16.	"Someone Worth Missing"	Brad Rempel; Ben Stennis; Tyler	Schmidt	3:16
17.	"First Second"	Block; David Garcia; James; Osborne	Crowell	2:51
18.	"'99 Problems"	Dawson; Seth Ennis; Minton; Reynolds	Dawson; Schmidt	2:46
19.	"It Don't Hurt Anymore"	Blake Bollinger; Craig Campbell; Trea London	Crowell	3:36
20.	"Take Me Down"	Jessie Jo Dillon; Garcia; Swindell; Chris Tompkins	Dragstrem	3:27
21.	"Heads Up Heaven"	McGill; Bobby Pinson; Swindell	Crowell	3:25
Total length:				65:27

== Personnel ==
- Cole Swindell – lead vocals (all tracks), background vocals (2, 16, 18)
- Jesse Frasure – producer, editing, programming, keyboard, background vocals, drums, acoustic guitar (track 1)
- Josh Thompson – background vocals (track 1)
- Jimmie Lee Sloas – bass (tracks 1, 3, 6–11, 14, 17, 19, 21)
- Dann Huff – electric guitar (track 1)
- Jenee Fleenor – mandolin (track 1), fiddle (2)
- Scotty Sanders – steel guitar (track 1), pedal steel guitar (14, 21), dobro (14)
- Jonny Fung – steel guitar (tracks 2, 4, 5, 12, 18), electric guitar, acoustic guitar (2, 4, 15, 16, 18), bass (2, 4, 16, 18) mandolin (2, 16), keyboard (4), engineer (4, 16, 18), dobro (5, 12, 16), resonator guitar (16), banjo (18)
- Jordan Schmidt – producer, editing, engineer (tracks 15, 16, 18), programming (2, 15, 16, 18), background vocals (2, 16), producer, editing, engineer (2)
- Renee Blair – background vocals (track 2)
- Josh Manuel – drums (tracks 2, 16, 18)
- Alex Wright – piano (tracks 2, 18), keyboard (15), engineer (tracks 16, 18), synthesizer, Hammond organ (16, 18), Rhodes piano (16)
- Todd Lombardo – acoustic guitar (tracks 3, 8, 10, 11), mandolin, bouzouki (8), banjo (10)
- Trey Keller – background vocals (tracks 3, 8–11, 13, 20), editing (3, 8–11)
- Dan Dugmore – dobro (track 3), pedal steel guitar (8–11)
- Evan Hutchings – drums, percussion (tracks 3, 8–11)
- Rob McNelley – electric guitar (tracks 3, 8–11, 13, 20)
- Dave Cohen – synthesizer (tracks 3, 8, 9, 13, 20), Wurlitzer piano (8–11), Hammond organ (9–11), Mellotron (11), organ, keyboard (13, 20)
- Devin Dawson – vocal producer, background vocals (tracks 4, 18), engineer (4), editing (18)
- Jordan Reynolds – producer, background vocals (track 4)
- Jacob Durrett – engineer, vocal producer, programming, drums, background vocals (track 4), editing (4, 18)
- Kyle Fishman – producer, editing, programming, keyboard, electric guitar, acoustic guitar (track 5)
- Michael Tyler – background vocals (track 5)
- Jimmy Robbins – producer, editing, electric guitar, bass, banjo, baritone guitar (tracks 5, 12), programming, acoustic guitar, keyboard (12)
- Miles McPherson – drums (tracks 5, 12)
- Ilya Toshinsky – acoustic guitar (tracks 6, 7, 13, 14, 17, 19, 20), banjo, mandolin (13, 20)
- Ben Caver – background vocals (tracks 6, 14, 17, 21)
- Nir Z – drums (tracks 6, 7, 13–15, 17, 19, 20), percussion (15)
- Kenny Greenberg – electric guitar (tracks 6, 7, 14, 17, 19, 21)
- Sol Philcox-Littlefield – electric guitar (tracks 6, 7, 14, 17, 19, 21)
- Zach Kale – background vocals (track 7)
- Devin Malone – electric guitar (tracks 7, 17, 19, 21), acoustic guitar (19, 21), banjo (19)
- Jonathan Singleton – banjo (track 8)
- Greylan James – producer, editing, engineer (track 15), programming (9, 15), synthesizer (9)
- Jameson Rodgers – background vocals (track 10)
- Lydia Vaughan – background vocals (track 12)
- Matt Dragstrem – producer, engineer, editing, programming, electric guitar, acoustic guitar (tracks 13, 20)
- Tony Lucido – bass (tracks 13, 20)
- Ben Stennis – programming (track 16)
- Jordan Minton – background vocals (track 18)
- Jeff Roach – piano, organ (track 21)
- Joe LaPorta – mastering (track 1)
- Sean Moffitt – mixing (track 1)
- Andrew Mendelson – mastering (tracks 2–21)
- Jim Cooley – mixing (tracks 2–6, 8–13, 15–21)
- Buckley Miller – engineer, editing (tracks 3, 8–11)
- Will Bundy – producer, editing (tracks 3, 8–11), programming (8–11), electric guitar (8, 9), engineer (9–11), background vocals (10)
- Chris Vanoverberghe – assistant engineer (tracks 3, 8–11)
- Terry Watson – engineer (tracks 4, 18), vocal engineer (18)
- Bryce Cain – editing (track 6)
- Zach Crowell – producer (tracks 6, 7, 14, 17, 19, 21), engineer (6, 7, 17, 19, 21), mixing (7, 14), programming, keyboard (14, 21), electric guitar (21)
- Nick Autry – engineer (tracks 6, 7, 14, 17, 19, 21)
- Will Kienzle – assistant engineer (tracks 6, 7, 17, 19, 21)
- Zach Willis – assistant mixing (tracks 8–11, 16, 18, 20)
- Nick Zin – editing, engineer (tracks 13, 20), vocal engineer (20)
- Zach Kuhlman – assistant mixing (tracks 17, 19, 21)

== Charts ==
Weekly chart performance for Spanish Moss
Chart (2025)	Peak position
US Top Country Albums (Billboard)	48
