= Chillin' It =

Single by Cole Swindell

from the album Cole Swindell
- Released: August 19, 2013
- Recorded: 2013
- Genre: Country
- Length: 3:16
- Label: Warner Bros. Nashville
- Songwriters: Cole Swindell; Shane Minor
- Producer: Jody Stevens

Cole Swindell singles chronology
| "Chillin' It" (2013) | "Hope You Get Lonely Tonight" (2014) |

"Chillin' It" is the debut single by American country music artist Cole Swindell. Swindell co-wrote the song with Shane Minor. Swindell released the song independently in March 2013 as a digital download. In July 2013, Swindell signed a record deal with Warner Bros. Records. Warner Bros. assumed promotion of the single and released it to country radio in August 2013. It is included on Swindell's self-titled debut album, which was released on February 18, 2014.

== History ==
The song was produced by Jody Stevens, the son of songwriter and producer Jeff Stevens, and formerly one-half of the duo Fast Ryde. According to The Tennessean, the recording was a demo made by Jody Stevens, with him playing all of the instruments.

== Content ==
The song is in the key of A major with a moderate tempo in 4/4 time signature, and a main chord pattern of D–A–E–F♯m^{7}.

== Critical reception ==
Billy Dukes of Taste of Country gave the song three and a half stars out of five, writing that it "isn't about the words or the musicianship. It's about the vibe and the sweet groove this Georgia-raised singer lays down patiently." Dukes also wrote that "the verses are pleasantly effective in telling a vivid (if overtold) story of a guy, a girl and the open road" and described it a "decaf version" of Florida Georgia Line's "Cruise". In 2017, Billboard contributor Chuck Dauphin put "Chillin' It" at number six on his top 10 list of Swindell's best songs.

== Music video ==
The music video was directed by Michael Monaco and Shaun Silva and premiered in November 2013.

== Chart performance ==
"Chillin' It" debuted at number 42 on the U.S. Billboard Hot Country Songs chart for the week of June 15, 2013. It also debuted at number 52 on the U.S. Billboard Country Airplay chart for the week of August 10, 2013. It also debuted at number 98 on the U.S. Billboard Hot 100 chart for the week of November 2, 2013. The song reach its 1 million sales mark in the US by March 2014. On March 24, 2014, the single was certified platinum by the Recording Industry Association of America (RIAA) for sales of over a million digital copies in the United States. As of April 2014, the song has sold 1,075,000 copies in the United States.

The song also debuted at number 100 on the Canadian Hot 100 chart for the week of January 11, 2014.

== Charts ==
=== Weekly charts ===
| Chart (2013–2014) | Peak position |
|---|---|
| Canada Hot 100 (Billboard) | 38 |
| Canada Country (Billboard) | 5 |
| US Billboard Hot 100 | 28 |
| US Country Airplay (Billboard) | 2 |
| US Hot Country Songs (Billboard) | 1 |

=== Year-end charts ===
| Chart (2013) | Position |
|---|---|
| US Country Airplay (Billboard) | 83 |
| US Hot Country Songs (Billboard) | 70 |

| Chart (2014) | Position |
|---|---|
| US Country Airplay (Billboard) | 30 |
| US Hot Country Songs (Billboard) | 35 |

== Certifications ==
| Region | Certification | Certified units/sales |
|---|---|---|
| Canada (Music Canada) | Platinum | 80,000^{*} |
| United States (RIAA) | 3× Platinum | 3,000,000^{‡} |
^{*} Sales figures based on certification alone.^{‡} Sales+streaming figures based on certification alone.
