= Greylan James =

- Born: June 18, 1996 (age 30); Knoxville, Tennessee, U.S.
- Origin: Nashville, Tennessee, U.S.
- Genre: Country
- Instruments: Vocals, guitar
- Years active: 2020-present
- Label: Big Machine

Greylan James (born June 18, 1996) is an American country music singer. Signed to Big Machine Records, he released his debut single "Water at a Wedding" in 2025 followed by a self-titled debut album in 2026.

== Biography ==
Greylan James was born June 18, 1996 in Knoxville, Tennessee. He expressed his interest in country music at age five after his grandparents bought him a guitar at Kmart. At age 17, he was featured in a magazine article published by Guitar Center, in addition to competing on The Voice. James moved to Nashville, Tennessee, after turning 18 to pursue a country music career. Although he signed his first publishing contract with songwriter Bob DiPiero, he was dropped from it two years later. Despite being dropped, he remained in contact with several Nashville songwriters, which led to him signing a second songwriting contract with Universal Music Publishing Group's Nashville branch. In 2020, he wrote "Happy Does" for Kenny Chesney. This was followed by "Next Thing You Know" by Jordan Davis, "Forever to Me" by Cole Swindell, and album cuts by Hardy and Darius Rucker. Additionally, he independently released an extended play titled I Hope She Hears These. After releasing the tracks "Anything Cold" and "Make the Best Memories" off the extended play, James toured with Scotty McCreery to promote the project. Basketball player Jimmy Butler co-wrote one of the songs on the EP, "Old Truck Young Love".

As he wanted to focus on performing over songwriting, he was signed to Big Machine Records in 2023 as an artist. The label released the single "Wait 'til You Have Kids" in 2025, with production and instrumentation by Jason Massey and Brock Berryhill. His next Big Machine release "Water at a Wedding" became his first to chart, making Billboard Hot Country Songs and Country Airplay by the end of 2025. James wrote the song with Matt Dragstrem and Chase McGill. He was inspired to write it after seeing an ex-girlfriend of his at a wedding, drinking water instead of alcohol, and presuming that this was due to her being pregnant.

The song was included on a self-titled album, released November 13, 2026 on Big Machine's Nashville Harbor imprint. James, Massey, and Berryhill alternated with Julian Raymond and Dann Huff in production, and James co-wrote every song except for a cover of Dolly Parton's "I Will Always Love You". Additionally, the album features a collaboration with Swindell on "Things That I Can't Change", and a duet version of "Water at a Wedding" with Gabriella Rose. James Daykin of Entertainment Focus thought the album was well-written and thematically consistent, and also thought that all of its songs had potential to be radio hits. His review made favorable comparison to both Jordan Davis and Old Dominion.

In November 2026, prior to the album's release, "Water at a Wedding" also became James's first song to enter the Billboard Hot 100. Additionally, James made his debut on the Grand Ole Opry in October 2026, and announced that he would be touring with Chesney in 2027.

== Discography ==
List of singles, with selected peak chart positions
Title	Year	Peak chart positions			Album
Title	Year	US	US Country	US Country Airplay	Album
"Wait 'Til You Have Kids"	2025	—	—	—	TBD
"Water at a Wedding"	2025	96	30	13	Greylan James
"—" denotes a recording that did not chart.
