= Forever to Me =

2024 single by Cole Swindell

Single by Cole Swindell

from the album Spanish Moss
- Released: April 12, 2024
- Genre: Country
- Length: 2:59
- Label: Warner Music Nashville
- Songwriters: Cole Swindell; Greylan James; Rocky Block
- Producers: Greylan James; Jordan Schmidt

Cole Swindell singles chronology
| "Drinkaby" (2023) | "Forever to Me" (2024) | "We Can Always Move On" (2025) |

"Forever to Me" is a song by American country music singer Cole Swindell, released on April 12, 2024, as the lead single from his fifth studio album, Spanish Moss (2025). It was written by Swindell, Greylan James and Rocky Block and produced by James and Jordan Schmidt.

== Background ==
The song centers around Swindell's relationship with his wife Courtney Little, a former member of the Charlotte Honey Bees. In 2023, Swindell periodically attempted to write a song of this topic for their first dance. On January 7, 2024, the day before he would headline the party in Houston at the 2024 College Football Playoff National Championship, Swindell asked songwriter Greylan James to join him in composing and find a third writer, at the last minute. James picked Rocky Block. They wrote a couple songs on the way to Houston and, after the concert, stayed up late on the bus talking. Swindell described Little as "forever to me", which his co-writers agreed to be the song they would write after they slept.

James developed an opening acoustic guitar riff that Swindell compared to Keith Whitley's style. The writers came up with the chorus' opening line, "She gave 18 summers to Carolina". The number of years was not quite correct but the state was; Brock noted, "That was a little bit poetic license, but it got the point across. We were just trying to say she grew up somewhere." He composed the melody at the end of the chorus, including the line "I might've gave her the diamond / But she gave forever to me". With respect to this, James said, "I would have never sang that off the bat. That's just a Rocky Block special." The word "gave" became important to the song, as the composers started writing about the things that Little had given to Swindell. The song references Carolina, Georgia and Tennessee. Originally, they started writing the verses with a line that referenced Dallas, where Swindell intended to propose. It became the second verse as the first recounted how they met. In the bridge, they wrote lyrics that referenced the reality television series Say Yes to the Dress and mentioned Little's mother, included a mention of Jesus (suggesting divinity is involved in the relationship), and the line "I wish you coulda met my daddy". After writing the bridge, Swindell came up with the opening line, "You ever seen a prayer in person?"

During the game, the three writers kept going back to a corner where they listened to the demo, which James paid extra attention to when he went back to Nashville, Tennessee due to the song's importance to Swindell's fiancée. In regard to recording the song, Swindell recalled, "It was a different kind of feeling — like, 'Man, I can't believe I'm singing this. I can't believe I wrote this song. I felt a lot of pressure to get it right."

When Swindell played the song for Little, she and her family loved it, though another song was eventually used for their first dance. Swindell made several attempts with different groups of musicians to record a final version of the song, but none of them captured the emotion in the way that the demo did. Ultimately, Swindell contacted Jordan Schmidt, who used much of Swindell's vocal and some of James' drum programming from the demo. Schmidt had drummer Nir Z add a layer of real drums playing over the digital percussion and had Jonny Fung re-record the guitar parts. Swindell also had a long phone call with Block and James about changing the lyric about Dallas, which became "There ain't no dancin' around it / When your whole world's standin' there".

== "Our Version" ==
On February 14, 2025, Swindell released a new rendition of the song, titled "Forever To Me (Our Version)", which is driven by piano. It was released with an accompanying video that features footage from Swindell and Little's wedding, which took place on June 12, 2024, in Sonoma, California.

== Charts ==
=== Weekly charts ===
Weekly chart performance for "Forever to Me"
| Chart (2024–2025) | Peak position |
|---|---|
| Canada Country (Billboard) | 50 |
| US Billboard Hot 100 | 91 |
| US Country Airplay (Billboard) | 2 |
| US Hot Country Songs (Billboard) | 25 |

=== Year-end charts ===
Year-end chart performance for "Forever to Me"
| Chart (2025) | Position |
|---|---|
| US Country Airplay (Billboard) | 12 |
| US Hot Country Songs (Billboard) | 68 |
