= Love You Too Late =

Single by Cole Swindell

from the album All of It
- Released: November 19, 2018
- Genre: Country
- Length: 3:25
- Label: Warner Nashville
- Songwriter(s): Cole Swindell; Michael Carter; Brandon Kinney
- Producer(s): Michael Carter

Cole Swindell singles chronology
"Break Up in the End" (2018)	"Love You Too Late" (2018)	"Single Saturday Night" (2020)

"Love You Too Late" is a song recorded by American country music singer Cole Swindell. It is the second single from his third studio album, 2018's All of It. Swindell wrote the song with Brandon Kinney and Michael Carter, the latter of whom also produced it.

== History ==
The song is about a relationship that ends quickly for the narrator, in which he realizes of the situation that he has "love[d] her too late". Swindell said that upon writing the song with frequent collaborators Michael Carter and Brandon Kinney that they originally wanted to write a more uptempo song. The other two writers did not have an idea for a title, until he suggested the idea of "telling somebody you love them too late [when] it doesn't even matter anymore". In a review for the blog Sounds Like Nashville, Annie Reuter called the song "infectious" and "[a]n arena-ready anthem with soaring guitar parts, heart-pounding beats and polished production".

== Music video ==
Sam Siske directed the music video, which features actress Kachina Dechert as Swindell's love interest. In the video, Dechert drives away from Swindell at a high speed, while he performs from the inside of a tunnel with a full band, as well as in the middle of a parking lot with her driving around him in circles.

== Charts ==
=== Weekly charts ===
Chart (2018–2019)	Peak position
Canada Country (Billboard)	8
US Billboard Hot 100	49
US Hot Country Songs (Billboard)	7
US Country Airplay (Billboard)	1

=== Year-end charts ===
Chart (2019)	Position
US Country Airplay (Billboard)	7
US Hot Country Songs (Billboard)	29

== Certifications ==
Region	Certification	Certified units/sales
United States (RIAA)	Platinum	1,000,000^{‡}
^{‡} Sales+streaming figures based on certification alone.
