= Fast Ryde =

American country music duo

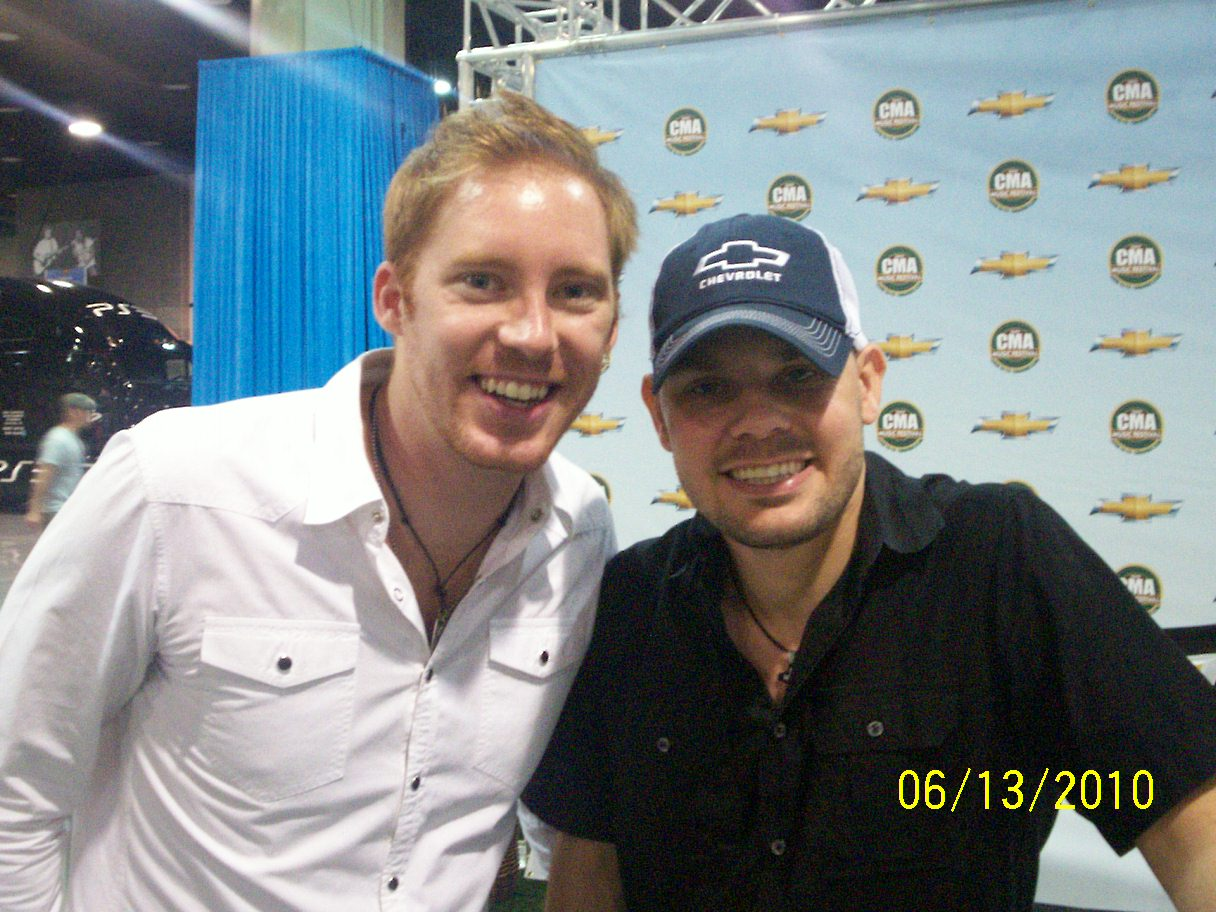
- James Harrison (left) and Jody Stevens, June 2010

Background information
- Origin: Nashville, Tennessee, U.S.
- Genres: Country
- Years active: 2008–10
- Labels: Republic Nashville
- Members: James Harrison; Jody Stevens

Fast Ryde was an American country music duo composed of singer-songwriters James Harrison and Jody Stevens, both of whom sing and play guitar. The duo was signed to Republic Records Nashville and has released three singles: "That Thang", which charted at number 38 on Hot Country Songs, plus "Make It Rain" and "Top Down".

== History ==
Fast Ryde was founded in 2008 by Jody Stevens and James Harrison, natives of West Virginia and Florida, respectively. Jody Stevens is the son of songwriter Jeff Stevens, who has written hits for George Strait and Tim McGraw and produces for Luke Bryan. Both Stevens and Harrison decided to work as songwriters in Nashville, Tennessee, and chose to form a duo. In 2009, Fast Ryde signed to Republic Records' newly established Nashville division, through the assistance of Scott Borchetta.

Fast Ryde's first single release was "That Thang," which the duo wrote after Stevens suggested that the two write a "booty song." This song was met with mixed reviews. Juli Thanki of Engine 145 gave the single a thumbs-down rating, criticizing the song for its repeated use of sung syllables and its similarity in theme to Trace Adkins' "Honky Tonk Badonkadonk." Alison Bonaguro, who reviewed the song in the blog for television network CMT said that it was "a nice little catchy rocker." Bobby Peacock of Roughstock also compared it to "Honky Tonk Badonkadonk," but also called the song a "silly little piece of ear candy." The song peaked at 38 on the U.S. Billboard Hot Country Songs charts for the week ending September 26, 2009.

The duo released "Make It Rain" in October 2009. Robert K. Oermann of MusicRow said that the song was "quite listenable and easy-smooth," and Peacock called it "just what Fast Ryde needs to get their foot in the door." "Top Down" was released as the duo's third single. It was also made into a music video, directed by Chris Hicky. After failing to chart with their second and third singles, they were released from Republic Nashville and their debut album was not released.

In late 2013, Stevens produced and performed all instrumentation on Cole Swindell's debut single "Chillin' It".

== Discography ==
=== Singles ===
Year	Single	Peak positions
Year	Single	US Country
2009	"That Thang"	38
2009	"Make It Rain"	—
2010	"Top Down"	—
"—" denotes releases that did not chart

=== Music videos ===
Year	Video	Director
2009	"Make It Rain"	Chris Hicky
2010	"Top Down"	Chris Hicky
