= Break Up in the End =

Single by Cole Swindell

from the album All of It
- Released: February 23, 2018
- Genre: Country
- Length: 3:19
- Label: Warner Nashville
- Songwriters: Jon Nite; Chase McGill; Jessie Jo Dillon
- Producer: Michael Carter

Cole Swindell singles chronology
"Stay Downtown" (2017)	"Break Up in the End" (2018)	"Love You Too Late" (2018)

"Break Up in the End" is a song written by Jon Nite, Chase McGill, and Jessie Jo Dillon, and recorded by American country music singer Cole Swindell. It was released in February 2018 as the lead single from his third album All of It. The song features a lyric about following through on a relationship despite knowing that it will end in a breakup, and it is accompanied by a music video directed by Jay Martin which stars Swindell and actress Alicia Watson. The song has been noted for Swindell's vocal performance.

== Content ==
Jon Nite, Chase McGill, and Jessie Jo Dillon wrote the song. McGill recorded a demo of the song on a keyboard, and sent it via Dropbox to Nite, who added his own vocals and an acoustic guitar. Although the song had been pitched to Luke Bryan and Dan + Shay, it ended up being recorded by Swindell, who was unaware that Dillon, a songwriting partner of his, had co-written it. Swindell said that he chose to record the song because he identified with its central theme of a breakup: "You still think the world of each other; it's just not gonna work out. [This song is] a love story, in a way. Every little line describes a place that I've been at some point."

Dillon said that the title was inspired by the book John Dies at the End, and decided to write a song about a man who feels bittersweet over a relationship, and follows through on it even though he is aware that they will "break up in the end". An article in Billboard compared the song's theme and lack of animosity in the protagonist's experience to Garth Brooks' "The Dance", Clint Black's "A Better Man", and Trisha Yearwood's "I Would've Loved You Anyway".

Swindell's recording of the song features an acoustic guitar accompaniment played by Billy Panda, along with muted percussion from Greg Morrow and piano chords from Michael Carter, who also produced the track. Taste of Country described the song's sound as " an acoustic guitar-based ballad that's very different from any other single Swindell has released. It's one of the most unguarded vocal performances he's ever given."

== Commercial performance ==
The song has sold 162,000 copies in the United States as of November 2018.

== Music video ==
The music video premiered on March 30, 2018. Directed by Jay Martin, it features Swindell and actress Alicia Watson progressing through a relationship that is filmed in reverse.

== Charts ==
=== Weekly charts ===
Chart (2018)	Peak position
Canada Country (Billboard)	34
US Billboard Hot 100	49
US Hot Country Songs (Billboard)	4
US Country Airplay (Billboard)	2

=== Year-end charts ===
Chart (2018)	Position
US Country Airplay (Billboard)	14
US Hot Country Songs (Billboard)	14

== Certifications ==
Region	Certification	Certified units/sales
Canada (Music Canada)	Gold	40,000^{‡}
United States (RIAA)	2× Platinum	2,000,000^{‡}
^{‡} Sales+streaming figures based on certification alone.
