= Adam Sanders =

American singer-songwriter (born 1988)

- Born: May 25, 1988 (age 37); Lake City, Florida
- Genres: Country
- Occupation: Singer-songwriter
- Years active: 2009–present
- Website: http://www.adamsandersmusic.com

Adam Sanders (born May 25, 1988) is an American singer and songwriter. In 2025, he won the first season of the music competition series The Road. Sanders has released 18 singles, five EPs, two full-length albums, and one live album as an independent artist. He has over 200 million total streams and charted at No. 33 on Billboard's Country Albums chart with his self-titled, debut EP. Sanders is a co-writer of the number one hits: Ain't Worth the Whiskey (for Cole Swindell) and Hell of a Night (for Dustin Lynch).

== Early life ==
Adam Sanders grew up in Lake City, Florida, where he was raised on hunting and fishing. He began singing when he was three years old. His uncle, steel guitar and dobro player Scotty Sanders, encouraged him to write songs. His father taught him three guitar chords at age ten and helped him write his first song at age twelve. He continued to write songs and play in local fairs, talent shows, and town festivals throughout his high school years.

In 2009, at age twenty-one, he moved to Nashville. At first, he worked construction with his father. In 2011, he signed a publishing deal with Big Yellow Dog Music. Within six months, Luke Bryan cut Sanders's song, "Out Like That". Sanders's friend and one of the first people that he met when moved to Nashville, Cole Swindell, played the song for Bryan. He liked it and chose it for his 2013 album, Crash My Party.

Swindell later recorded "Ain't Worth the Whiskey", a song that Swindell, Sanders, and Josh Martin wrote. The songwriters joked that the song belonged to the first from the group to get a record deal. "Ain't Worth the Whiskey" became Sanders's first number one as a songwriter and Swindell's third consecutive number one as an artist. By 2015, Dustin Lynch had also made a number one hit of a Sanders co-write, "Hell of a Night".

== Music career ==
Sanders began his artist journey by testing the market with singles. His first single, "Nothin’ To Do But Drink", premiered on SiriusXM's The Highway in June 2014. "Somewhere That You Don’t Go", followed on the channel and saw success by being named a "Highway Find". The video for his third single, "Thunder" drew attention from Rolling Stone, who called it "emotionally-charged, ominous" and "intense". Sanders toured extensively in 2015 with Cole Swindell.

Sanders continued to release singles in 2016. The video for "About To" drew from horror film inspiration and spent time in rotation on CMT. The song and video received critical acclaim from CMT, Taste of Country, and The Boot. The single "I've Been Meaning To Call" was inspired by his relationship with his mom. He toured with Cam on her Burning House Tour.

Sanders released two singles, "Thankful For" and "Over Did It", ahead of his May 2018 self-titled debut EP. The EP charted at No. 33 on Billboard’s Country Albums. The video for "Over Did It" rotated on CMT music.

In February 2020, Sanders released a feel good song, called "Ruled The World", which Billboard called an "infectious tune". The song was a collaboration on multiple levels. It was written by Sanders, Hunter Phelps, and Chris LaCorte. Singer-songwriters Hunter Phelps, Ray Fulcher, Cash Campbell, Faren Rachels, Josh Mirenda, Mitch Rossell, and Drew Parker join Sanders in providing vocals for the song. Tracy Lawrence, Aaron Tippin, and Shenandoah’s Marty Raybon and Mike McGuire joined for the video.

Sanders showcases his talents at singing the songs that he wrote in his January 2021 album, Adam Sanders (Live). The album includes Sanders's version of the number one hits that he wrote: Cole Swindell's, Ain't Worth the Whiskey and Dustin Lynch's, Hell of a Night. The album is Sanders's way of bringing live music to his fans that couldn't experience live shows during the pandemic.

In May 2021, Sanders released What If I’m Right, his first full-length studio album. What If I'm Right features the single, "Daddy, Jesus and Earnhardt". The song is a tribute to NASCAR legend, Dale Earnhardt. Sanders told People Magazine that he and his father were watching as Earnhardt crashed and that "losing him had a major impact for me". People wrote that the song "could go and make Sanders a country music superstar". The title track "What If I'm Right", caught Rolling Stone's attention, as they wrote that it's "a meaty production of big drums and bigger guitars, with an emphasis on how it’ll play on radio and for the seats at the back of the arena, delivered in a confident tenor".

In December 2025, Sanders won the first season of CBS/Paramount+ music competition The Road, earning a $250,000 prize, a recording contract, and a performance slot at the Stagecoach Music Festival.

== Discography ==
Studio albums

- What If I'm Right (2021)
- Right in the Middle of It (2024)

Extended plays

- Adam Sanders (2018)
- I Wanna Be Somebody (2024)
- All Summer Long (2024)
- 90's Kid (2024)
- Tell Somebody 'bout You (2024)

Live albums

- Adam Sanders (Live) (2021)

Singles

- Nothin' to Do but Drink (2014)
- Somewhere That You Don’t Go (2015)
- Thunder (2015)
- About To (2016)
- I've Been Meaning to Call (2016)
- Sippin' on the Good Times (2017)
- We Live It (2018)
- Miss Me Memphis (2018)
- Life I'm Livin' (2019)
- I Don't Just Sing About It (2019)
- Damn Strait (2019)
- Ruled The World (2020)
- Make Em Wanna Change (2020)
- Drink Drank Drunk (2020)
- What If I'm Right (2021)
- Cat In a Hat (2025)
- Get It If You Did It (2025)
- Bible in a House Fire (2025)

== Music videos ==
Year	Video	Director
2016	"Thunder"	Matt DeLisi
2016	"About To"	Zach Daulton
2016	"I've Been Meaning To Call"	
2017	"Thankful For"	
2018	"Over Did It"	Michael Monaco
2018	"We Live It"	
2020	"Ruled The World"	
2020	"Make Em Wanna Change"	
2020	"Drink Drank Drunk"	
2021	"What If I'm Right"	Austin Peckham
2021	"Do What We Do"	
2021	"Bible Versus"	
2022	"All Summer Long"	Alex Pescosta
2022	"Maybe We Should Just Sleep On It"	
2024	"Good Day to Fly"	
2024	"Do What You Do"	
