= Down Home Sessions =

EP by Cole Swindell
- Released: November 17, 2014
- Recorded: 2014
- Genre: Country
- Length: 17:36
- Label: Warner Bros. Nashville
- Producer: Michael Carter

Cole Swindell chronology
Cole Swindell (2014)	Down Home Sessions (2014)	Down Home Sessions II (2015)

Down Home Sessions is the first extended play from American country music artist Cole Swindell. The album peaked at number eight on Top Country Albums and sold 12,000 copies.

== Track listing ==
No.	Title	Writer(s)	Length
1.	"Ready"	Cole Swindell; Brandon Kinney	3:03
2.	"The Way You’re Lovin’ Me Now"	Swindell; Luke Bryan; Michael Carter	3:38
3.	"Kiss"	Swindell; Ashley Gorley; Zach Crowell	4:00
4.	"Workin’ on Me"	Swindell; Shane Minor; Wade Kirby	3:56
5.	"Boomerang"	Swindell; Kinney; Carter	2:59
Total length:			17:36

== Charts ==
Chart (2014)	Peak position
US Billboard 200	36
US Top Country Albums (Billboard)	8
