= Halfway to Hazard (album) =

Studio album by Halfway to Hazard
- Released: August 14, 2007
- Genre: Country
- Label: Mercury Nashville/StyleSonic
- Producers: Tim McGraw; Byron Gallimore

Halfway to Hazard chronology
Halfway to Hazard (2007)	Come on Time (2009)

Halfway to Hazard is the debut studio album by American country music duo Halfway to Hazard. It was released through a joint venture of Mercury Nashville Records and StyleSonic Records on August 14, 2007. The tracks "Daisy" and "Devil and the Cross" were both released as singles. The album was produced by singer Tim McGraw, owner of the StyleSonic label, and Byron Gallimore, who has co-produced all of McGraw's albums. The song 8."Country 'Til the Day I Die" was featured in NASCAR 08.

== Critical reception ==
David McPherson of Country Standard Time gave the album a positive review, stating that "This country fried concoction blends Southern rock with a generous helping of modern country for a concoction that goes down as smooth as bourbon from their home state."

== Tracks ==
No.	Title	Writer(s)	Length
1.	"Countrified"	Kip Raines, Jeffrey Steele	4:31
2.	"Taking Me On"	Bobby Pinson, David Tolliver, Chad Warrix	4:21
3.	"Cold"	Kris Bergsnes, Tolliver, Warrix	4:34
4.	"Daisy"	Anthony Smith, Tolliver, Warrix	5:38
5.	"I'm Tired"	Arlis Albritton, Tolliver, Warrix	5:06
6.	"Devil and the Cross"	Jim Dowell	4:17
7.	"Die by My Own Hand"	Rivers Rutherford, Tolliver, Warrix	5:34
8.	"Country 'til the Day We Die"	Albritton, Tolliver, Warrix	3:30
9.	"Got Back Up"	Smith, Tolliver, Warrix	4:34
10.	"Burn It Down"	Bergsnes, Tolliver, Warrix	5:10
11.	"Welcome to Nashville"	Shannon Lawson, Tolliver	3:08
Total length:			50:23

== Personnel ==
Halfway to Hazard

- David Tolliver - Guitar, vocals, synthesizer, harmonica, kazoo, mandolin, crowd noise, background vocals
- Chad Warrix - banjo, acoustic guitar, electric guitar, mandolin, slide guitar, crowd noise, vocals

Additional Musicians

- Tom Bukovac - acoustic guitar, electric guitar
- Paul Bushnell - bass guitar
- Joanna Cotten - background vocals
- Dan Dugmore - Dobro, acoustic guitar, lap steel guitar, pedal steel guitar
- Edward Eason - slide guitar
- Shannon Forrest - drums, percussion
- Byron Gallimore - synthesizer
- Eric Gallimore - crowd noise
- Rob Hajacos - fiddle
- Tony Harrell - clavinet, piano, organ
- Sara Lesher - crowd noise
- Greg Morrow - drums, percussion
- Glenn Worf - bass guitar
- Jonathan Yudkin - bouzouki, mandolin, strings

== Chart performance ==
Chart (2007)	Peak position
US Billboard 200	87
US Top Country Albums (Billboard)	14
