= Hope You Get Lonely Tonight =

Single by Cole Swindell

from the album Cole Swindell
- Released: March 24, 2014
- Recorded: 2013–14
- Genre: Country
- Length: 3:48
- Label: Warner Bros. Nashville
- Songwriters: Cole Swindell; Brian Kelley; Tyler Hubbard; Michael Carter
- Producer: Michael Carter

Cole Swindell singles chronology
"Chillin' It" (2013)	"Hope You Get Lonely Tonight" (2014)	"Ain't Worth the Whiskey" (2014)

"Hope You Get Lonely Tonight" is a song co-written and recorded by American country music artist Cole Swindell. It was released on March 24, 2014 by Warner Bros. Nashville as the second single from Swindell's self-titled debut album. Swindell wrote the song with Brian Kelley and Tyler Hubbard of Florida Georgia Line and Michael Carter.

The song received positive reviews from critics who praised its lyricism and different takes on typical country tropes. "Hope You Get Lonely Tonight" peaked at number one on the US Billboard Country Airplay chart, giving Swindell his second number-one country hit overall. It also charted at numbers seven and 50 on the Hot Country Songs and US Billboard Hot 100 charts respectively. The song was certified platinum by the Recording Industry Association of America (RIAA), denoting sales of over one million units in that country. The song also charted in Canada at number six on the Country chart and number 74 on the Canadian Hot 100. It was also certified gold by Music Canada, denoting sales of over 40,000 units in that country.

The accompanying music video was directed by Peter Zavadil and features Swindell and his girlfriend hanging out separately at night.

== Critical reception ==
Billy Dukes of Taste of Country gave the song a favorable review, praising it for having "sharp lyrics, fine storytelling and an undeniable familiarity." Dukes wrote that Swindell "uses country tropes in unique ways" and added that "the production is thick with guitar and synthesizers, but nothing gets in the way of this fine lyric." Ashley Cooke of Roughstock gave the song four stars out of five, calling it "destined for success" and "a well-written song, which is sure to gain attention in this new 'Pop/Country', 'Bro-Country' world." In 2017, Billboard contributor Chuck Dauphin put "Hope You Get Lonely Tonight" at number three on his top 10 list of Swindell's best songs.

== Music video ==
The music video was directed by Peter Zavadil and premiered in August 2014. The video features Swindell and his girlfriend hanging out separately while feeling depressed; Swindell alone at a bar and she hanging out with her girlfriends. The video ends with both of them meeting together at a diner.

== Chart performance ==
"Hope You Get Lonely Tonight" debuted at number 57 on the U.S. Billboard Country Airplay chart for the week of March 22, 2014. It also debuted at number 27 on the U.S. Billboard Hot Country Songs chart for the week of February 1, 2014. For the week of October 11, the song became his first number one single on the Country Airplay chart. As of October 2014, the single has sold 617,000 copies in the United States. On January 6, 2016, the single was certified platinum by the Recording Industry Association of America (RIAA) for sales of over a million digital copies in the United States.

== Charts ==
=== Weekly charts ===
Chart (2014)	Peak position
Canada Hot 100 (Billboard)	74
Canada Country (Billboard)	6
US Billboard Hot 100	50
US Country Airplay (Billboard)	1
US Hot Country Songs (Billboard)	7

=== Year-end charts ===
Chart (2014)	Position
US Country Airplay (Billboard)	7
US Hot Country Songs (Billboard)	21

== Certifications ==
Region	Certification	Certified units/sales
Canada (Music Canada)	Gold	40,000^{*}
United States (RIAA)	Platinum	1,000,000^{‡}
^{*} Sales figures based on certification alone.^{‡} Sales+streaming figures based on certification alone.
