= That Thang =

Single by Fast Ryde
- Released: July 31, 2009
- Recorded: 2009
- Genre: Country
- Length: 3:09
- Label: Republic Nashville
- Songwriter(s): James Harrison; Jody Stevens
- Producer(s): Jody Stevens

Fast Ryde singles chronology
"That Thang" (2009)	"Make It Rain" (2009)

"That Thang" is a song written and recorded by song by American country music duo Fast Ryde. It was released in late July 2009 as the duo's debut single.

== Critical reception ==
This song was met with mixed reviews. Juli Thanki of Engine 145 gave the single a thumbs-down rating, criticizing the song for its repeated use of sung syllables and its similarity in theme to Trace Adkins' "Honky Tonk Badonkadonk." Alison Bonaguro, who reviewed the song in the blog for television network CMT said that it was "a nice little catchy rocker." Bobby Peacock of Roughstock also compared it to "Honky Tonk Badonkadonk," but also called the song a "silly little piece of ear candy."

== Chart performance ==
The song peaked at 38 on the U.S. Billboard Hot Country Songs charts for the week ending September 26, 2009.

Chart (2009)	Peak position
US Hot Country Songs (Billboard)	38
