= Water at a Wedding =

2025 single by Greylan James

Single by Greylan James

from the album Greylan James
- Written: September 2024
- Released: July 11, 2025
- Genre: Country
- Length: 3:33
- Label: Nashville Harbor
- Songwriters: Greylan James; Matt Dragstrem; Chase McGill
- Producers: Greylan James; Jason Massey

Greylan James singles chronology
"Wait Til You Have Kids" (2025)	"Water at a Wedding" (2025)	"Give Me A Second (the before)" (2025)

Music video
- "Water at a Wedding" on YouTube

"Water at a Wedding" is a song by American country music singer Greylan James. It was released on July 11, 2025 as the lead single from his self-titled debut album. James wrote the song with Matt Dragstrem and Chase McGill, and produced it with Jason Massey.

== Background and promotion ==
Greylan James wrote the song in September 2024, about his experience of attending his ex-girlfriend's wedding. He and his co-writers included a narrative twist in the bridge, where James suggests that his ex may be expecting his baby. They originally wanted to reveal this in the second verse, but held it back for listeners to process the story. James warned his ex about the song before releasing it.

Although James had another single at radio, he struggled to promote it because it did not reflect his personal experiences. Against his label's advice, he teased the song on TikTok using a burner account, helping it garner widespread recognition and convincing his label to release it. James also went on to make several sequels to the song.

== Music video ==
The music video was released on July 16, 2026. James later recalled that filming the video, which reenacted the wedding in the song, brought back difficult memories, and one of the extras in the video happened to know his ex-girlfriend.

== Remix ==
On October 7, 2026, James released a remix of the song titled "Water at a Wedding (her side)". It features American singer Gabriella Rose, who sings from the bride's perspective in the story.

== Live performances ==
James performed the song during his Grand Ole Opry debut on October 24, 2026.

== Charts ==
Chart performance for "Water at a Wedding"
Chart (2025-2026)	Peak position
US Billboard Hot 100	96
US Country Airplay (Billboard)	13
US Hot Country Songs (Billboard)	30
