= Carolina Rain =

American country music group

- Origin: Nashville, Tennessee, U.S.
- Genres: Country
- Years active: 2003–2009
- Label: Equity Music Group
- Members: Jeremy Baxter; Rhean Boyer; Marvin Evatt

Carolina Rain was an American country music group composed of Jeremy Baxter (tenor vocals, mandolin), Rhean Boyer (lead vocals, guitar), and Marvin Evatt (baritone vocals, guitar, banjo). Founded in 2003, the band was signed in 2004 as the first act on Equity Music Group, an independent record label owned by country music artist Clint Black. Carolina Rain has released one studio album (2006's Weather the Storm) and has charted five singles on the U.S. Billboard Hot Country Songs charts. Two more singles were released in 2008 before Equity closed. In April 2019, Marvin Evatt released his debut EP titled Songs from the Boat

== Music career ==
=== Weather the Storm ===
In 2004, Carolina Rain signed to Equity Music Group, a label formed by Clint Black. The band was the first act signed to the label besides Black himself. Carolina Rain released its debut single, "I Ain't Scared", which reached No. 41 on the U.S. Billboard Hot Country Songs chart. Following it were two additional singles, "Louisiana Love", and "Let's Get It On". "Louisiana Love" failed to chart, and "Let's Get It On" reached No. 57. However, those songs were never included on an album. Then in 2006, the group released "Get Outta My Way". Co-written by Robert Ellis Orrall and Curtis Wright, this song became their first Top 40 country hit, peaking at No. 28. After its release came their debut album Weather the Storm, which also included "I Ain't Scared". After "Get Outta My Way" came their highest-charting single in the No. 26 "Isn't She", followed by the non-charting "Dealin'".

=== American Radio ===
In late 2008, the group released a new single titled "American Radio". The single intended to be the lead-off to a second studio album of the same name. The song reached No. 53 on the country charts a few weeks after its release. A second single from the album, "Weight of the World" was released, but Equity closed in December 2008.

== Discography ==
=== Studio albums ===
Title	Album details	Peak positions
Title	Album details	US Country
Weather the Storm	Release date: September 19, 2006; Label: Equity Music Group	60

=== Singles ===
Year	Single	Peak positions	Album
Year	Single	US Country	Album
2004	"I Ain't Scared"	41	Weather the Storm
2005	"Louisiana Love"	—	—N/a
2005	"Let's Get It On"	57	—N/a
2006	"Get Outta My Way"	28	Weather the Storm
2006	"Isn't She"	26	Weather the Storm
2007	"Dealin'"	—	Weather the Storm
2008	"American Radio"	53	—N/a
2008	"Weight of the World"	—	—N/a
"—" denotes releases that did not chart

=== Music videos ===
Year	Video	Director
2006	"Get Outta My Way"	Sam Erickson
