= Halfway to Hazard =

- Origin: Hazard, Kentucky, United States
- Genres: country
- Years active: 2007–2010, 2015–present
- Labels: Mercury Nashville/StyleSonic; Picnic Hill
- Members: David Tolliver; Chad Warrix
- Website: halfwaytohazard.com

Halfway to Hazard is an American country music duo composed of singer-songwriters David Tolliver and Chad Warrix. Though Tolliver and Warrix grew up in different towns in southeastern Kentucky, their band's origins are in Hazard, Kentucky, which was halfway between their hometowns. Warrix is from Jackson, Kentucky, while Tolliver is from Hindman, Kentucky.

== Biography ==
Their debut single, "Daisy", was a Top 40 hit on the U.S. Billboard Hot Country Songs charts in 2007. The song was also featured as iTunes' single of the week on August 6, 2007. In addition, they toured as Tim McGraw and Faith Hill's opening act on their Soul2Soul 2007 Tour. McGraw helped to produce the album.

On October 14, 2007, the duo performed the national anthem prior to the Green Bay Packers' home game against the Washington Redskins. Later that season they performed again at Lambeau Field for the Packers NFC Championship game against the New York Giants.

In May 2008, they were nominated by the Academy of Country Music for the Duo of the Year award. Halfway to Hazard toured again on the Live Your Voice tour with Tim McGraw and Jason Aldean.

The duo created the "Halfway to Hazard Charity Concert and Trailride" later simply renamed "Crockettsville." (Crockettsville, KY is located near Chad Warrix's hometown) The annual event from 2008 to 2014 featured various friends of Chad and David/music entertainers as Chris Young, Lee Brice, Randy Houser, Lit, Tim McGraw, Dierks Bentley, Montgomery Gentry, Keith Anderson, Danielle Peck, Ray Scott and many more. The multi-day event/festival included a 40+ mile off-road ATV ride and an outdoor concert along with miscellaneous carnival attractions and extreme motocross trick teams. The duo partnered with KY based charity, Concerts 4 a Cause from 2009 on. The event's proceeds were given to various local charities mostly involving children and education. Other notable celebrities included motocross legend Ricky Carmichael, UFC Hall of Famer Rich "Ace" Franklin, race car driver Kyle Petty, and Sirius XM's Storme Warren.

A single from their second album, "I Know Where Heaven Is," was released on July 20, 2009. The album, Come on Time, was released on October 19, 2009. Neither charted.

The duo took an official hiatus from 2011 to 2014 . During this time, Warrix toured as lead guitarist for with Randy Houser and also Keith Anderson.

Warrix released a solo music video, "Rain on the Roof," in 2012, featuring former All Pro NFL Tennessee Titan's kicker, Rob Bironas.

Tolliver now writes full-time for Curb music publishing and formerly of Tim McGraw's publishing company, StyleSonic. He and Warrix had one song, "Die by My Own Hand," on McGraw's Emotional Traffic album and Tolliver has the song "Let Me Love It Out of You" on McGraw's Two Lanes of Freedom album. Brantley Gilbert, Lee Brice, Jerrod Niemann, Chris Young, Pryor Baird, Edwin McCain, Cade Foehner, Wynonna Judd, Tim Montana, Joe Diffie, Neal McCoy, and many others have also recorded Tolliver's songs. Halfway to Hazard released two singles for purchase on iTunes via their own Picnic Hill Label. "Heaven On Down the Highway" and "American Outlaw" respectively. Their album REDemption was released in 2017 on their own Picnic Hill Records imprint, as was Live at Analog in 2019. Tolliver recently had a number one in the Bluegrass music genre with "Blue Skies", recorded by Buddy Melton, and he also won two Cannes Lion awards for his work with Tennessee Tourism's "Sound Sites" project.

== Discography ==
=== Albums ===
Title	Album details	Peak chart positions	
Title	Album details	US Country	US
Halfway to Hazard	Release date: August 14, 2007; Label: Mercury Nashville/StyleSonic	14	87
Come On Time	Release date: October 19, 2009; Label: Picnic Hill Records	—	—
REDemptiOn	Release date: October 27, 2017; Label: Picnic Hill Records	—	—
Live at Analog	• Release date: May 17, 2019 • Label: Picnic Hill Records		
"—" denotes releases that did not chart

=== Singles ===
Year	Single	Peak positions	Album
Year	Single	US Country	Album
2007	"Daisy"	39	Halfway to Hazard
2007	"Devil and the Cross"	50	Halfway to Hazard
2009	"I Know Where Heaven Is"	—	Come On Time
2015	"Heaven On Down the Highway"	__	REDemption
2016	"American Outlaw"	__	REDemption
"—" denotes releases that did not chart

=== Music videos ===
Year	Video	Director
2007	"Daisy"	Traci Goudie
2007	"Countrified"	Cory Kelley
2009	"I Know Where Heaven Is"	Cory Kelley
2016	"American Outlaw"	Charles Shouse
