= You Should Be Here (song) =

2015 single by Cole Swindell

Single by Cole Swindell

from the album You Should Be Here
- Released: December 14, 2015
- Recorded: 2015
- Genre: Country pop; country rock
- Length: 3:09
- Label: Warner Bros. Nashville
- Songwriters: Cole Swindell; Ashley Gorley
- Producer: Michael Carter

Cole Swindell singles chronology
"Let Me See Ya Girl" (2015)	"You Should Be Here" (2015)	"Middle of a Memory" (2016)

"You Should Be Here" is a song co-written and recorded by American country music artist Cole Swindell. The song was released to radio on December 14, 2015, via Warner Bros. Nashville as the lead single to his second studio album of the same name (2016). The song, written by Swindell and Ashley Gorley, is a tribute to Swindell's father who died unexpectedly while Swindell was out on tour after signing his record deal.

"You Should Be Here" reached number one on both the Billboard Country Airplay and Hot Country Songs charts respectively, giving Swindell his fourth number-one country hit overall. It also gave him his second top 40 hit on the Hot 100, peaking at number 31. The song was certified 2× platinum by the RIAA, and has sold 706,000 copies in the United States as of July 2016. It achieved similar chart success in Canada, peaking at number three on the Country chart and number 67 on the Canadian Hot 100.

An accompanying music video for the song was directed by Michael Monaco.

== Background ==
The song is the title track of Swindell's second album You Should Be Here. The song was written as a tribute to his father, who died unexpectedly while Swindell was out on his radio tour in September 2013, shortly after Swindell had signed a record deal with Warner Music Nashville. According to CMT News, Swindell's father, William Swindell, died unexpectedly "when a truck he was working on fell on him."

== Critical reception ==
Website Taste of Country reviewed the single favorably, saying that "Cole Swindell's 'You Should Be Here' is personal and accessible. The piano-driven ballad about the death of his father isn't so specific that those who haven’t lost a parent feel left out. More than a tribute, it's a soundtrack for those moments that are perfect except for one vacant parking spot." In 2017, Billboard contributor Chuck Dauphin placed "You Should Be Here" at number one on his top 10 list of Swindell's best songs.

== Commercial performance ==
You Should Be Here debuted at number 69 on the US Billboard Hot 100, and at number 10 on Hot Country Songs charts on the song release. The song topped both the Hot Country Songs, and the Country Airplay charts in March 2016. The song peaked at number 31 on the Hot 100 for chart dated April 16, 2016. As of July 2016, the song has sold 706,000 copies in the United States. On April 4, 2019, the single was certified 2× platinum by the Recording Industry Association of America (RIAA) for combined sales and streaming data of over a million units in the United States.

== Music video ==
The music video was directed by Michael Monaco and premiered in December 2015.

== Charts ==
=== Weekly charts ===
Chart (2015–2016)	Peak position
Canada Hot 100 (Billboard)	67
Canada Country (Billboard)	3
US Billboard Hot 100	31
US Country Airplay (Billboard)	1
US Hot Country Songs (Billboard)	1

=== Year end charts ===
Chart (2016)	Position
US Country Airplay (Billboard)	32
US Hot Country Songs (Billboard)	6

== Certifications ==
Region	Certification	Certified units/sales
Canada (Music Canada)	Gold	40,000^{‡}
United States (RIAA)	3× Platinum	3,000,000^{‡}
^{‡} Sales+streaming figures based on certification alone.
