= You Should Be Here (album) =

Studio album by Cole Swindell
- Released: May 6, 2016
- Recorded: 2015–16
- Studios: Sound Emporium (Nashville, Tennessee)
- Genre: Country
- Length: 41:32
- Label: Warner Bros. Nashville
- Producer: Michael Carter

Cole Swindell chronology
Down Home Sessions II (2015)	You Should Be Here (2016)	Down Home Sessions III (2016)

Singles from You Should Be Here
- 1. "You Should Be Here" Released: December 14, 2015; 2. "Middle of a Memory" Released: May 2, 2016; 3. "Flatliner" Released: January 23, 2017; 4. "Stay Downtown" Released: September 5, 2017

Professional ratings
Review scores
Source	Rating
AllMusic	3/5 stars

You Should Be Here is the second studio album by American country music artist Cole Swindell. It was released on May 6, 2016 via Warner Bros. Nashville. The lead single, its title track, was released to radio on December 14, 2015. The song became Swindell's fourth number-one hit after it reached the top of both the Hot Country Songs and Country Airplay charts of Billboard magazine. The track listing was announced on April 4. The track "Flatliner" peaked at number two on US Country Airplay in 2017. "Flatliner" also hit number one on Mediabase country radio singles chart and was most played and heard August 6–12 receiving ~8,302 spins (+600) and ~52.136 million audience impressions.

== Commercial performance ==
You Should Be Here debuted at number two on Billboard's Top Country Albums chart, selling 65,500 copies in its first week. It also debuted at number six on US Billboard 200 chart. On February 21, 2017, the album was certified gold for combined sales and album-equivalent units of over 500,000 units. As of June 2018, the album has sold 318,000 copies in the United States.

== Track listing ==
No.	Title	Writer(s)	Length
1.	"Flatliner" (featuring Dierks Bentley)	Cole Swindell; Jaron Boyer; Matt Bronleewe	2:57
2.	"Middle of a Memory"	Swindell; Zach Crowell; Ashley Gorley	3:47
3.	"Broke Down"	Swindell; Michael Carter; Gorley	3:24
4.	"Home Game"	Aaron Eshuis; Brandon Lay; Heather Morgan	4:09
5.	"Up"	Terry McBride; Brad Tursi	3:14
6.	"Party Wasn't Over"	Swindell; Tyler Hubbard; Brian Kelley; Canaan Smith	3:47
7.	"Stay Downtown"	Matt Dragstrem; Cole Taylor	3:23
8.	"You Should Be Here"	Swindell; Gorley	3:11
9.	"Stars"	Ben Hayslip; Chase McGill	3:20
10.	"Making My Way to You"	Swindell; Dragstrem; Taylor; Carter	3:29
11.	"No Can Left Behind"	Swindell; Carter; Brandon Kinney	3:48
12.	"Remember Boys"	Andrew Dorff; Tursi	3:03
Total length:			41:32

Target and iTunes edition
No.	Title	Writer(s)	Length
13.	"Hoppin'"	Swindell; Brad Warren; Brett Warren	3:23
14.	"Gettin' Forgotten"	Swindell; Casey Beathard	3:16

== Personnel ==
Adapted from AllMusic

- Dierks Bentley - featured vocals on "Flatliner" (uncredited)
- Pat Buchanan - electric guitar
- Michael Carter - electric guitar, keyboards, piano, programming, synthesizer
- Dave Cohen - Hammond B-3 organ, keyboards, piano, synthesizer
- James Mitchell - electric guitar
- Greg Morrow - drums, percussion
- John Palmieri - percussion, background vocals
- Billy Panda - acoustic guitar
- Cole Swindell - lead vocals
- Russell Terrell - background vocals
- Patrick Thrasher - programming
- Mike Wolofsky - bass guitar

== Charts ==
=== Weekly charts ===
Chart (2016)	Peak position
Australian Albums (ARIA)	52
Canadian Albums (Billboard)	10
US Billboard 200	6
US Top Country Albums (Billboard)	2

==== Year-end charts ====
Chart (2016)	Position
US Billboard 200	96
US Top Country Albums (Billboard)	14
Chart (2017)	Position
US Billboard 200	156
US Top Country Albums (Billboard)	23
Chart (2018)	Position
US Top Country Albums (Billboard)	78

=== Singles ===
Year	Single	Peak chart positions					Sales
Year	Single	US Hot Country	US Country Airplay	US	CAN Country	CAN	Sales
2015	"You Should Be Here"	1	1	31	3	67	US: 430,000
2016	"Middle of a Memory"	3	1	46	3	81	US: 310,000
2017	"Flatliner"	10	2	56	4		US: 223,000
2017	"Stay Downtown"	34	28				

== Certifications ==
Region	Certification	Certified units/sales
United States (RIAA)	Platinum	1,000,000^{‡}
^{‡} Sales+streaming figures based on certification alone.
