= Chuck Dauphin =

American journalist (1974–2019)

- Born: Charles Frederick Dauphin III; February 17, 1974; Dickson, Tennessee, U.S.
- Died: September 18, 2019 (aged 45); Nashville, Tennessee, U.S.
- Occupations: Journalist, radio broadcaster

Charles Frederick Dauphin III (February 17, 1974 – September 18, 2019) was an American sports and country music journalist. He was a radio broadcaster for WDKN in Dickson, Tennessee for 18 years, a radio show host and sports director at WNKX in Centerville for 10 years, and a contributing writer to Billboard from 2011 until his death. He received an Achievement Award at the 2014 Country Music Association Awards.

He died at Nashville's Alive Hospice following a series of complications from diabetes.
