= Cole Swindell =

American singer-songwriter (born 1983)

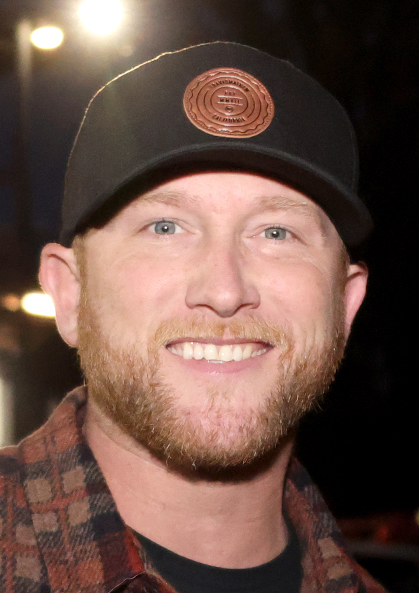
- Swindell in 2021

Background information
- Born: Colden Rainey Swindell; June 30, 1983 (age 43); Glennville, Georgia, U.S.
- Origin: Franklin, Tennessee, U.S.
- Genres: Country; country pop
- Occupations: Singer; songwriter
- Instrument: Vocals
- Years active: 2013–present
- Label: Warner Bros. Nashville
- Spouse: Courtney Little (m. 2024)
- Website: coleswindell.com

Colden Rainey Swindell (born June 30, 1983) is an American country music singer and songwriter. He has written singles for Craig Campbell, Thomas Rhett, Scotty McCreery, and Luke Bryan, and has released four albums for Warner Bros. Records Nashville. He has released thirteen singles, eight of which have reached number one on the Hot Country Songs and/or Country Airplay charts. Five more singles have reached the Top 10. Swindell is known for hits such as “Chillin’ It,” “You Should Be Here,” “Flatliner,” “Never Say Never,” and “She Had Me At Heads Carolina.”

== Early life ==
Swindell was born in Glennville, Georgia, on June 30, 1983, to William Keith Swindell and Betty Carol Rainey. He grew up in Dawson, Georgia, and has two brothers and a stepbrother.

Swindell attended Terrell Academy in Dawson. Swindell attended Georgia Southern University, where he majored in marketing. He met Luke Bryan, who attended the same university some years earlier and was also a fellow Sigma Chi member, at the fraternity house when Bryan came back to Statesboro to do a show. They kept in touch, and after Swindell left college in 2007 and moved to Nashville, he sold merchandise for Bryan for three years, and wrote songs on the road.

== Music career ==
=== Songwriting ===
In 2010, Swindell signed a publishing deal with Sony/ATV Music Publishing.

Swindell wrote Craig Campbell's "Outta My Head", Luke Bryan's "Just a Sip", "Beer in the Headlights", "Roller Coaster", "Out Like That", "I'm Hungover", "In Love with the Girl", Florida Georgia Line’s "This Is How We Roll" with Bryan, who was featured on the song. Chris Young also had a song on his A.M. album co-written by Swindell, "Nothin' but the Cooler Left"

=== 2013–2015: Cole Swindell ===
In 2013, Swindell's independently released debut single "Chillin' It", buoyed by heavy airplay on SiriusXM satellite radio channel "The Highway", became a hit and Swindell signed a record deal with Warner Music Nashville. The demo of "Chillin' It" was sent to radio before it had been mastered.

Swindell released his self-titled debut album on February 18, 2014. Luke Bryan's guitarist, Michael Carter, produced the rest of the album. Along with Lee Brice, Swindell opened Bryan's 2014 That's My Kind of Night Tour. "Chillin' It" became a top-five hit on Country Airplay and number 1 single on Hot Country Songs. The album's second single is "Hope You Get Lonely Tonight", which Swindell and Carter co-wrote with both members of Florida Georgia Line, Brian Kelley and Tyler Hubbard. The album's third single, "Ain't Worth the Whiskey", was released to country radio on November 3, 2014. It reached number one on the Country Airplay chart in April 2015. The album's fourth single, "Let Me See Ya Girl", was released to country radio on April 20, 2015. It reached number two on the Country Airplay chart in November 2015.

On November 17, 2014, Swindell released a five-song digital EP, The Down Home Sessions. The release coincided with his headlining tour of the same name.

Swindell won the ACM New Artist of the Year Award in April 2015.

=== 2015–2018: You Should Be Here ===
The album's first single, "You Should Be Here" was released to country radio on December 14, 2015. It was written with Ashley Gorley. It reached at number one on the Country Airplay and Hot Country Songs charts in April 2016. The album's second single, "Middle of a Memory" released to country radio on May 2, 2016. It reached at number one on the Country Airplay in November 2016. The album's third single, "Flatliner" (featuring Dierks Bentley) released to country radio on January 23, 2017. It reached at number two on the Country Airplay in August 2017. The album's fourth single, "Stay Downtown" released to country radio on September 5, 2017. "You Should Be Here", "Middle of a Memory" and "Flatliner" all hit No.1 on Mediabase country radio singles chart.

Swindell also released a music video for the song which featured a video of him telling his father he received a record contract and subsequent montages of Cole and his brothers grieving outside of the family home and at their father's grave. The video also shows images of Swindell's rising popularity while clearly conveying that he wanted to be able to see his father and share this fame experience with him.

=== 2018–2024: All of It and Stereotype ===
Swindell released "Break Up in the End", the lead single from his third album, on February 23, 2018. Swindell's third album, All of It, was released on August 17, 2018. After the album became available for pre-order in July 2018, Swindell released the number-one track "Love You Too Late" as a promotional single. "Love You Too Late" was announced as the album's official second single, being released to radio on November 19, 2018.

The lead single from Swindell's fourth studio album, "Single Saturday Night", was released on May 22, 2020. It was followed by "Never Say Never", a duet with Lainey Wilson, on November 19, 2021. Swindell released his fourth album Stereotype on April 8, 2022. Swindell followed the album up with its third single, "She Had Me at Heads Carolina", a remake of Jo Dee Messina's 1996 single "Heads Carolina, Tails California". This single has gone on to become the biggest single of Swindell's career so far, having spent four weeks at number one on the Country Airplay chart, as well as becoming his first Top 20 single on the Billboard Hot 100 and was certified three-times Platinum by RIAA.

=== 2025–present: Spanish Moss ===
On March 25, 2025, Swindell announced his fifth album Spanish Moss. It was released on June 27, 2025. The title track was released on March 28, 2025. On September 26, 2025, Swindell released "Make Heaven Crowded", a song inspired by the assassination of Charlie Kirk.

== Personal life ==
In 2019, Swindell was confirmed to be dating professional wrestler and model Barbie Blank, best known for her time in WWE under the ring name "Kelly Kelly". The couple broke up three months after making their first public appearance at that year's Academy of Country Music Awards.

In 2024, Swindell married Courtney Little, a former member of the Charlotte Honey Bees. On March 3, 2025, the couple announced that they are expecting their first child. On August 7, 2025, their daughter was born.

== Discography ==
Studio albums

- Cole Swindell (2014)
- You Should Be Here (2016)
- All of It (2018)
- Stereotype (2022)
- Spanish Moss (2025)

== Tours ==
Headlining

- Reason to Drink Tour (2018)
- The Down to Earth Tour (2020)
- Happy Hour Sad Tour (2025)

Supporting

- Burn It Down Tour with Jason Aldean (2015)
- The Big Revival Tour with Kenny Chesney (2015)
- Dig Your Roots Tour with Florida Georgia Line (2016)
- What the Hell Tour with Dierks Bentley (2017)
- Sunset Repeat Tour with Luke Bryan (2019)
- Center Point Road Tour with Thomas Rhett (2021)

== Awards and nominations ==
Year	Awards	Category	Recipient/Work	Result	Ref
2014	CMT Music Awards	Breakthrough Video of the Year	"Chillin’ It"	Nominated	
2015	Academy of Country Music Awards	New Artist of the Year	Cole Swindell	Won	
2015	iHeartRadio Music Awards	Best New Artist	Cole Swindell	Nominated	
2016	Country Music Association Awards	New Artist of the Year	Cole Swindell	Nominated	
2017	iHeartRadio Music Awards	Country Song of the Year	"You Should Be Here"	Nominated	
2017	iHeartRadio Music Awards	Best Lyrics	"You Should Be Here"	Nominated	
2017	CMT Music Awards	Video of the Year	"Middle of a Memory"	Nominated	
2019	CMT Music Awards	Male Video of the Year	"Break Up in the End"	Nominated	
2019	Grammy Awards	Best Country Song	"Break Up in the End"	Nominated	
2019	Academy of Country Music Awards	Song of the Year	"Break Up in the End"	Nominated	
2026	Dove Awards	Country/Roots Recorded Song of the Year	"Still Do"	Nominated	
