= Michael Carter (musician) =

American singer-songwriter

- Born: Sylvester, Georgia, U.S.
- Origin: Nashville, Tennessee
- Genres: Country
- Occupations: Songwriter, musician, record producer
- Instruments: Guitar, Piano
- Years active: 2007-present

Michael Carter is an American guitarist, songwriter, and record producer, known for his work with Luke Bryan and Cole Swindell.

Carter is Bryan's lead guitarist and bandleader. He and Swindell, a former merchandise vendor of Bryan's, co-wrote Craig Campbell's "Outta My Head", Thomas Rhett's "Get Me Some of That", Swindell's "Hope You Get Lonely Tonight", and Bryan's "Roller Coaster". Carter also produced Swindell's self-titled debut album.
