= Lainey Wilson discography =

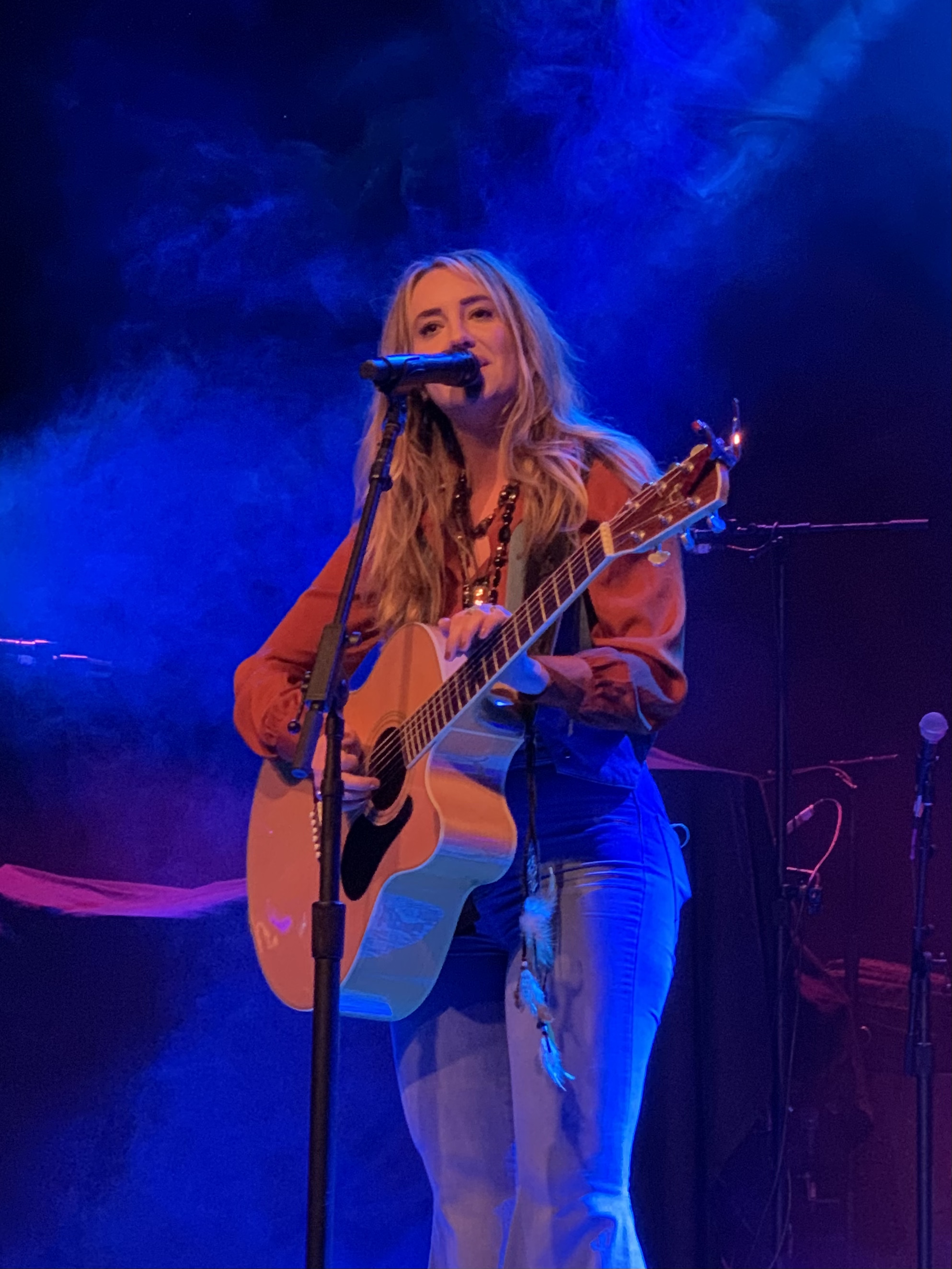
- Wilson in concert, 2020
- Studio albums: 5
- EPs: 4
- Singles: 11
- Music videos: 7
- Promotional singles: 10
- Other album appearances: 2

American country singer Lainey Wilson has released five studio albums, four extended plays (EPs), seven music videos, 11 singles, and ten promotional singles; she has appeared on two additional albums. While still in high school, Wilson self-released an EP of songs on her Myspace account called Country Girls Rule. In 2014, her self-titled studio album was issued on the Cupit label and was later followed in 2016 by her second studio offering Tougher. The latter disc was her first to make Billboard Top Country Albums.

In 2018, she self-released a second EP. After signing a recording contract with the BBR Music Group, the label issued her third EP titled Redneck Hollywood (2019). Her debut single with the label was also released in 2019 called "Dirty Looks". In 2020, Wilson's second BBR single was issued titled "Things a Man Oughta Know". The release became her breakout single, topping the Billboard Country Airplay chart and reaching the top five of the Hot Country Songs. In 2021, her third studio album was issued called Sayin' What I'm Thinkin'. The disc was her second to chart on the Country Albums list.

In 2022, Wilson's fourth studio album was released titled Bell Bottom Country. It was her first to reach the top ten of the Country Albums chart and also her first to reach the Billboard 200 all-genre chart. Its lead single "Heart Like a Truck" subsequently reached the Country Airplay and Country Songs top ten and number one on the Canada Country chart. During this period she was featured on Hardy's single "Wait in the Truck" and Cole Swindell's chart-topping "Never Say Never". The second single from Bell Bottom Country, "Watermelon Moonshine", became Wilson's third number one when it topped the Country Airplay chart in October 2023. She achieved her fourth two months later when "Save Me", a collaboration with Jelly Roll, reached the top in December.

== Studio albums ==
List of albums, with selected chart positions, showing other relevant details
Title	Album details	Peak chart positions							Certifications
Title	Album details	US	US Cou.	AUS	CAN	NZ	SCO	UK	Certifications
Lainey Wilson	Released: August 6, 2014; Label: Cupit; Formats: Digital	—	—	—	—	—	—	—	
Tougher	Released: April 8, 2016; Label: Lone Chief; Formats: CD, digital	—	44	—	—	—	—	—	
Sayin' What I'm Thinkin'	Released: February 19, 2021; Label: BBR; Formats: LP, CD, digital	—	40	—	—	—	74	—	RIAA: Gold
Bell Bottom Country	Released: October 28, 2022; Label: BBR; Formats: LP, CD, digital	51	9	35	—	—	64	—	RIAA: Platinum; MC: Gold
Whirlwind	Released: August 23, 2024; Label: BBR; Formats: LP, CD, digital	8	3	8	19	19	3	13	RIAA: Gold; MC: Platinum
"—" denotes a recording that did not chart or was not released in that territory.

== Extended plays ==
List of extended plays, showing relevant details
Title	EP details
Country Girls Rule	Released: 2006; Label: Self-released; Format: Digital
Lainey Wilson	Released: April 13, 2018; Label: Self-released; Format: Digital
Redneck Hollywood	Released: September 13, 2019; Label: BBR; Format: Digital
Peace, Love and Cowboys (Holiday Edition)	Released: October 17, 2025; Label: Broken Bow / Primary Wave; Format: Digital

== Singles ==
=== As lead artist ===
List of singles, with selected chart positions and certifications, showing other relevant details
Title	Year	Peak chart positions					Certifications	Album
Title	Year	US	US Cou. Songs	US Cou. Air.	CAN	CAN Cou.	Certifications	Album
"Dirty Looks" (Note: Both "Dirty Looks" and "Things a Man Oughta Know" first appeared on the 2019 EP Redneck Hollywood before officially appearing on an album.)	2019	—	—	—	—	—		Sayin' What I'm Thinkin'
"Things a Man Oughta Know"	2020	32	3	1	65	4	RIAA: 3× Platinum; MC: 2× Platinum; RMNZ: Gold	Sayin' What I'm Thinkin'
"Heart Like a Truck"	2022	29	7	2	53	1	RIAA: 4× Platinum; ARIA: Gold; MC: 2× Platinum; RMNZ: Gold	Bell Bottom Country
"Watermelon Moonshine"	2023	21	7	1	47	1	RIAA: 3× Platinum; ARIA: Gold; MC: Platinum; RMNZ: Gold	Bell Bottom Country
"Wildflowers and Wild Horses"	2023	48	8	5	65	1	RIAA: Platinum; MC: Gold	Bell Bottom Country
"Hang Tight Honey"	2024	61	19	13	81	3	RIAA: Gold; MC: Platinum	Whirlwind (Note: "Somewhere Over Laredo" appears exclusively on the deluxe edition of Whirlwind.)
"4x4xU"	2024	45	9	4	44	1	RIAA: 2× Platinum; MC: 3× Platinum; RMNZ: Gold	Whirlwind
"Somewhere Over Laredo"	2025	36	7	1	53	3	MC: Platinum	Whirlwind
"The Jesus I Know Now" (with Brandon Lake)	2026	— (Note: "The Jesus I Know Now" did not enter the Billboard Hot 100, but peaked at number 21 on the Bubbling Under Hot 100 chart.)	42	—	—	—		Non-album single
"Phone, Keys, Wallet" (with John Mayer)	2026	43	12	9	42	1		TBA
"—" denotes a recording that did not chart or was not released in that territory.

=== As a featured artist ===
List of singles, with selected chart positions, showing other relevant details
Title	Year	Peak chart positions							Certifications	Album
Title	Year	US	US Cou. Songs	US Cou. Air.	US AAA	CAN	CAN Cou.	WW	Certifications	Album
"Mama Ain't Jesus" (Jordan Rowe featuring Lainey Wilson)	2021	—	—	—	—	—	—	—		—N/a
"Never Say Never" (with Cole Swindell)	2021	27	2	1	—	47	1	—	RIAA: Platinum; MC: Gold	Stereotype
"Wait in the Truck" (Hardy featuring Lainey Wilson)	2022	23	5	2	—	42	2	118	RIAA: 3× Platinum	The Mockingbird & the Crow
"Save Me" (Jelly Roll with Lainey Wilson)	2023	19	6	1	—	38	1	—	ARIA: Gold	Whitsitt Chapel
"Wilted Rose" (The Black Crowes featuring Lainey Wilson)	2024	—	—	—	29	—	—	—		Happiness Bastards
"Light of a Clear Blue Morning" (Dolly Parton featuring Lainey Wilson, Miley Cyrus, Queen Latifah and Reba McEntire)	2026	—	—	41	—	—	—	—		Non-album single
"—" denotes a recording that did not chart or was not released in that territory.

=== Promotional singles ===
List of promotional singles, showing all relevant details
Title	Year	Peak chart positions					Album
Title	Year	US	US Cou. Songs	US Cou. Air.	CAN Cou.	NZ Hot	Album
"Tougher"	2015	—	—	—	—	—	Tougher
"Workin' Overtime"	2018	—	—	—	—	—	Lainey Wilson (EP)
"High on Somethin'"	2018	—	—	—	—	—	—N/a
"WWDD"	2020	—	—	—	—	—	Sayin' What I'm Thinkin'
"Rolling Stone"	2020	—	—	—	—	—	Sayin' What I'm Thinkin'
"Sunday Best"	2020	—	—	—	—	—	Sayin' What I'm Thinkin'
"Small Town, Girl"	2020	—	—	—	—	—	Sayin' What I'm Thinkin'
"Neon Diamonds"	2020	—	—	—	—	—	Sayin' What I'm Thinkin'
"Two Story House"	2021	—	—	—	—	—	—N/a
"Christmas Cookies"	2021	—	—	57	41	—	—N/a
"Beer Song" (with Chase Rice and Granger Smith)	2021	—	—	—	—	—	Hixtape, Vol. 2
"Live Off"	2022	—	—	—	—	—	Bell Bottom Country
"Country's Cool Again"	2024	—	—	—	—	—	Whirlwind
"Go Home W U" (with Keith Urban)	2024	—	—	—	—	—	High
"Out of Oklahoma"	2024	— (Note: "Out of Oklahoma" did not enter the Billboard Hot 100, but peaked at number 20 on the Bubbling Under Hot 100 chart.)	40	—	—	—	Twisters: The Album
"Good Horses" (featuring Miranda Lambert)	2024	—	—	—	58	—	Whirlwind
"Can't Sit Still"	2026	82	26	—	42	11	—N/a
"Kinda Love It"	2026	93	29	—	—	22	—N/a
"—" denotes a recording that did not chart or was not released in that territory.

== Other charted and certified songs ==
List of other charted songs, with selected chart positions and certifications, showing other relevant details
Title	Year	Peak chart positions							Certifications	Album
Title	Year	US	US Cou. Songs	US Cou. Air.	CAN	CAN Cou.	NZ Hot	WW	Certifications	Album
"Pieces" (Muscadine Bloodline featuring Lainey Wilson)	2020	—	—	—	—	—	—	—	RIAA: Platinum	Turn Back Time
"Nosedive" (Post Malone featuring Lainey Wilson)	2024	50	18	—	43	—	—	110		F-1 Trillion
"Whirlwind"	2024	—	—	—	—	—	30	—	MC: Gold	Whirlwind (Note: "Bell Bottoms Up" appears exclusively on the deluxe edition of Whirlwind.)
"Bell Bottoms Up"	2025	—	—	—	—	—	39	—		Whirlwind
"Trailblazer" (with Reba McEntire and Miranda Lambert)	2025	—	44	—	—	—	—	—		—N/a
"Let It Snow! Let It Snow! Let It Snow!" (with Bing Crosby)	2025	—	—	53	—	52	—	—		Peace, Love and Cowboys (Holiday Edition)
"—" denotes a recording that did not chart or was not released in that territory.

== Music videos ==
List of music videos, showing year released and director
Title	Year	Director(s)	Ref.
"Workin' Overtime"	2018	Jessica Steddom	
"Things a Man Oughta Know"	2021	Chris Ashlee; Sean O'Halloran	
"Never Say Never" (with Cole Swindell)	2022	Michael Monaco	
"Heart Like a Truck"	2022	Eliabeth Olmstead	
"Wait in the Truck" (with Hardy)	2022	Justin Clough	
"Grease"	2023	Preston Leatherman	
"Watermelon Moonshine"	2023	Stephen & Alexa Kinigopoulos	
"Wildflowers and Wild Horses"	2024	Patrick Tracy	
"Hang Tight Honey"	2024	Dano Cerny	
"4x4xU"	2024	Dano Cerny	
"Whirlwind"	2024	Dustin Haney	
"Somewhere Over Laredo"	2025	TK McKamy	

== Guest appearances ==
List of non-single guest appearances, with other performing artists, showing year released and album name
Title	Year	Other artist(s)	Album
"Good Time to Me"	2021	King Calaway	Midnight
"Drunk on Christmas"	2021	Darren Criss	A Very Darren Crissmas
"You Can't Always Get What You Want"	2023	—N/a	Stoned Cold Country
"Thicc as Thieves"	2023	Lauren Alaina	Unlocked
"Mama He's Crazy"	2023	Dolly Parton	A Tribute to The Judds
"Would If I Could"	2024	Ernest	Nashville, Tennessee
"Nosedive"	2024	Post Malone	F-1 Trillion
"Wild Woman (Lainey Wilson Version)"	2025	Aerosmith, Yungblud	One More Time
