= Whirlwind World Tour =

2025 concert tour by Lainey Wilson

- Tour by Lainey Wilson
- Location: Europe; North America
- Associated album: Whirlwind
- Start date: March 4, 2025
- End date: November 8, 2025
- Legs: 2
- No. of shows: 10 in Europe; 37 in North America; 47 Total

Lainey Wilson concert chronology
- Country's Cool Again Tour (2024); Whirlwind World Tour (2025)

The Whirlwind World Tour is the third headlining concert tour by American country music singer Lainey Wilson. It is in support of her fifth studio album, Whirlwind (2024). The tour began on March 4, 2025, in Zurich, Switzerland and concluded on November 8, 2025, in Orlando, Florida. This is her first world tour.

== Background ==
The tour was first announced in January 2025.

== Opening acts ==
- Kaitlin Butts
- ERNEST
- Maddox Batson
- Zach Meadows
- Drake Milligan
- Muscadine Bloodline
- Lauren Watkins

== Set list ==
This set list is a representative of the show at The O2 in London during the C2C: Country to Country music festival on March 14, 2025. It does not represent all tour dates.

1. "Hang Tight Honey"
2. "Smells Like Smoke"
3. "Dirty Looks"
4. "Good Horses"
5. "Things a Man Oughta Know"
6. "Middle of It"
7. "Whirlwind"
8. "Heart Like a Truck"
9. "Bar in Baton Rouge"
10. "Ring Finger"
11. "Atta Girl"
12. "Watermelon Moonshine"
13. "Keep Up with Jones"
14. "Country's Cool Again"
15. "Come Together" (The Beatles cover)
16. "4x4xU"
17. "Wildflowers and Wild Horses"

== Tour dates ==
Date	City	Country	Venue	Opening acts
Europe
March 4, 2025	Zurich	Switzerland	X-TRA	Zach Meadows
March 6, 2025	Antwerp	Belgium	De Roma	Zach Meadows
March 8, 2025	Rotterdam	Netherlands	Rotterdam Ahoy	—N/a
March 9, 2025	Berlin	Germany	Uber Eats Music Hall	—N/a
March 12, 2025	Copenhagen	Denmark	Vega	Zach Meadows
March 14, 2025 (Note: The show on March 14 2025 was part of C2C: Country to Country.)	London	England	The O_{2} Arena	—N/a
March 15, 2025 (Note: The show on March 15, 2025 was a part of C2C: Country to Country.)	Belfast	Northern Ireland	SSE Arena	—N/a
March 16, 2025 (Note: The show on March 16, 2025 was a part of C2C: Country to Country.)	Glasgow	Scotland	OVO Hydro	—N/a
March 19, 2025	Paris	France	Élysée Montmartre	Zach Meadows
North America
May 30, 2025 (Note: The show on May 30, 2025 is a part of Pepsi Gulf Coast Jam.)	Panama City Beach	United States	Pepsi Gulf Coast Jam	—N/a
May 31, 2025 (Note: The show on May 31, 2025 is a part of Railbird Festival.)	Lexington	United States	Railbird Festival	—N/a
June 6, 2025 (Note: The show on June 6, 2025 is a part of Carolina Country Music Fest.)	Myrtle Beach	United States	Carolina Country Music Fest	—N/a
June 20, 2025 (Note: The show on June 20, 2025 is a part of Barefoot Country Music Fest.)	Wildwood	United States	Barefoot Country Music Fest	—N/a
June 26, 2025 (Note: The show on June 26, 2025 is a part of Summerfest.)	Milwaukee	United States	Summerfest	—N/a
June 27, 2025 (Note: The show on June 27, 2025 is a part of Hoofbeat.)	Cadott	United States	Hoofbeat	—N/a
June 6, 2025 (Note: The show on June 6, 2025 is a part of Cavendish Beach Music Festival.)	Cavendish	Canada	Cavendish Beach Music Festival	—N/a
August 14, 2025	Phoenix	United States	PHX Arena	ERNEST; Kaitlin Butts
August 15, 2025	Albuquerque	United States	Isleta Amphitheater	ERNEST; Kaitlin Butts
August 16, 2025	Denver	United States	Ball Arena	ERNEST; Kaitlin Butts
August 21, 2025	Bend	United States	Hayden Homes Amphitheater	ERNEST; Kaitlin Butts
August 22, 2025	Sacramento	United States	Golden 1 Center	ERNEST; Kaitlin Butts
August 23, 2025	Inglewood	United States	Kia Forum	ERNEST; Kaitlin Butts
August 28, 2025	Calgary	Canada	Scotiabank Saddledome	ERNEST; Kaitlin Butts
August 29, 2025	Edmonton	Canada	Rogers Place	ERNEST; Kaitlin Butts
August 30, 2025	Saskatoon	Canada	SaskTel Centre	ERNEST; Kaitlin Butts
September 11, 2025	Baton Rouge	United States	Raising Cane's River Center	ERNEST; Maddox Batson
September 12, 2025	Bossier City	United States	Brookshire Grocery Arena	ERNEST; Maddox Batson
September 18, 2025	Austin	United States	Moody Center	Muscadine Bloodline; Drake Milligan
September 19, 2025	Fort Worth	United States	Dickies Arena	Muscadine Bloodline; Drake Milligan
September 20, 2025	The Woodlands	United States	Cynthia Woods Mitchell Pavilion	Muscadine Bloodline; Drake Milligan
September 25, 2025	Toronto	Canada	Budweiser Stage	Muscadine Bloodline; Lauren Watkins
September 26, 2025	Clarkston	United States	Pine Knob Music Theatre	Muscadine Bloodline; Lauren Watkins
September 27, 2025	Grand Rapids	United States	Van Andel Arena	Muscadine Bloodline; Lauren Watkins
October 2, 2025	Nashville	United States	Bridgestone Arena	Muscadine Bloodline; Maddox Batson
October 3, 2025	Noblesville	United States	Ruoff Music Center	Muscadine Bloodline; Lauren Watkins
October 4, 2025	Cuyahoga Falls	United States	Blossom Music Center	Muscadine Bloodline; Lauren Watkins
October 9, 2025	Columbia	United States	Merriweather Post Pavilion	Muscadine Bloodline; Lauren Watkins
October 10, 2025	New York City	United States	Madison Square Garden	Muscadine Bloodline; Lauren Watkins
October 11, 2025	Mansfield	United States	Xfinity Center	Muscadine Bloodline; Lauren Watkins
October 16, 2025	Maryland Heights	United States	Hollywood Casino Amphitheatre	Muscadine Bloodline; Maddox Batson
October 17, 2025	Rosemont	United States	Allstate Arena	Muscadine Bloodline; Maddox Batson
October 18, 2025	Saint Paul	United States	Xcel Energy Center	Muscadine Bloodline; Maddox Batson
October 24, 2025	Knoxville	United States	Thompson-Boling Arena	ERNEST; Drake Milligan
October 25, 2025	Charlotte	United States	Spectrum Center	ERNEST; Drake Milligan
November 7, 2025	Tampa	United States	Benchmark International Arena	ERNEST; Drake Milligan
November 8, 2025	Orlando	United States	Kia Center	ERNEST; Drake Milligan
