= High (Keith Urban album) =

Studio album by Keith Urban
- Released: 20 September 2024
- Recorded: 2022–24
- Studios: Sound Stage (Nashville); Blackbird (Nashville); Standard (Los Angeles); Chief Beats (Nashville); Skeye (Nashville); Asher's Place (Franklin); Bunya (Sutton Forest); Facet House (West Hollywood); Phantom (Gallatin); Good Lander (Nashville)
- Genre: Country pop
- Length: 39:50
- Labels: Hit Red; Capitol Nashville
- Producers: Eren Cannata; Mike Elizondo; Dann Huff; Marc Scibilia; Sean Small; Sam Sumser; Keith Urban; Greg Wells

Keith Urban chronology
The Speed of Now Part 1 (2020)	High (2024)	Flow State (2026)

Singles from High
- 1. "Straight Line" Released: 2 February 2024; 2. "Messed Up as Me" Released: 1 March 2024; 3. "Go Home W U" Released: 3 May 2024; 4. "Wildside" Released: 28 June 2024; 5. "Heart Like a Hometown" Released: 2025; 6. "Chuck Taylors" Released: 2025

High is the twelfth studio album by Australian and American country music singer Keith Urban. The album was released on 20 September 2024 via Hit Red and Capitol Records Nashville.

At the 2025 ARIA Music Awards, the album was nominated for Best Country Album.

== Background ==
High marks Urban's first studio album since The Speed of Now Part 1 (2020). He began working on an album in 2022, tentatively titled 615, but ultimately scrapped the project. Several of the songs from that project eventually made their way onto High, a 12-track set that he titled after the feeling of "euphoria" he felt during the creative process. On the title, Urban said: "What makes you 'high' can mean whatever you want it to mean. It might be physical, spiritual, herbal, meditative, chemical, or musical, but it’s definitely a place of utopia."

Urban wrote the album's opening interlude and co-wrote six of its tracks, and it features a collaboration with Lainey Wilson ("Go Home W U").

"Straight Line" was released as the album's lead single in February 2024. It was followed by "Messed Up as Me", the first single promoted to country radio in the United States and Canada, in March 2024. "Go Home W U" and "Wildside" were released as additional singles ahead of the album release.

== Track listing ==
High track listing
No.	Title	Writer(s)	Producer(s)	Length
1.	"Blue Sky"	Keith Urban		0:12
2.	"Straight Line"	Urban; Jerry Flowers; Chase McGill; Greg Wells	Urban; Wells	3:46
3.	"Messed Up as Me"	Rodney Clawson; Jessie Jo Dillon; Michael Lotten; Shane McAnally	Urban; Dann Huff	3:16
4.	"Wildside"	Urban; Ernest; David Garcia; Ashley Gorley	Urban; Huff	2:47
5.	"Go Home W U" (with Lainey Wilson)	Urban; Breland; Sean Small; Sam Sumser	Urban; Sumser; Small	3:47
6.	"Chuck Taylors"	Urban; Flowers; McGill; Wells	Urban; Wells	3:34
7.	"Daytona"	Nathan Barlowe; Steven Lee Olsen	Urban; Huff	2:58
8.	"Love Is Hard"	Eren Cannata; McAnally; Justin Tranter	Urban; Cannata	2:52
9.	"Heart Like a Hometown"	Casey Brown; Matt Roy; Parker Welling	Urban; Huff	2:46
10.	"Laughin' All the Way to the Drank"	Urban; Ben Burgess; Terence F. Clark; Mike Elizondo	Urban; Elizondo	4:31
11.	"Dodge in a Silverado"	Thomas Archer; Ben Stennis; Michael Tyler	Urban; Huff	4:54
12.	"Break the Chain"	Urban; Marc Scibilia	Urban; Scibilia	4:24
Total length:				39:50

High (Deluxe) track listing
No.	Title	Writer(s)	Length
13.	"Straight Line" (Live from the High and Alive World Tour)	Urban; Flowers; McGill; Wells	6:45
14.	"Messed Up as Me" (Live from the High and Alive World Tour)	Clawson; Dillon; Lotten; McAnally	4:23
15.	"Go Home W U" (Live from the High and Alive World Tour)	Urban; Breland; Small; Sumser	3:58
16.	"Chuck Taylors" (Live from the High and Alive World Tour)	Urban; Flowers; McGill; Wells	4:02
17.	"Heart Like a Hometown" (Live from the High and Alive World Tour)	Brown; Roy; Welling	3:07
18.	"Laughin' All the Way to the Drank" (Live from the High and Alive World Tour)	Urban; Burgess; Clark; Elizondo	4:28
Total length:			66:33

== Personnel ==
Musicians

- Keith Urban – lead vocals (all tracks), electric guitar (tracks 2–7, 9–12), background vocals (2–6, 8–12), acoustic guitar (3, 4, 6, 7, 9–12), piano (3, 7, 11), 12-string acoustic guitar (3), ganjo (4, 6, 10), bass (5, 6), EBow (6, 9); Del Oro acoustic guitar, percussion (12)
- Greg Wells – keyboards, programming (tracks 2, 6); bass, drum programming (2); drums, rototoms (6)
- Jerry Flowers – acoustic guitar, background vocals (tracks 2, 6); mandolin (2)
- Aaron Sterling – drums (track 2)
- Dann Huff – electric guitar (tracks 3, 4, 7, 9, 11), acoustic guitar (3)
- David Huff – programming (tracks 3, 4, 9), percussion (3)
- Jimmie Lee Sloas – bass (tracks 3, 7, 9)
- Charlie Judge – synthesizer (tracks 3, 7), piano (4, 7), keyboards (4, 9)
- Matt Chamberlain – drums (track 3), programming (7)
- Michael Lotten – acoustic guitar, keyboards, programming (track 3)
- Jerry Roe – drums (tracks 4–6, 11)
- Terence F. Clark – percussion (track 4), drums (7, 9, 10)
- Josh Reedy – background vocals (tracks 4, 11)
- Craig Young – bass (track 4)
- David Garcia – programming (track 4)
- Sean Small – background vocals, programming (track 5)
- Sam Sumser – background vocals, programming (track 5)
- Lainey Wilson – vocals (track 5)
- Breland – background vocals (track 5)
- Paul Mabury – drums (track 6)
- Nathan Barlowe – keyboards (track 7)
- Eren Cannata – acoustic guitar, background vocals, drums, electric guitar, keyboards, percussion, programming (track 8)
- Justin Tranter – background vocals (track 8)
- Mike Elizondo – bass, drum programming, keyboards (track 10)
- Jenee Fleenor – fiddle (track 10)
- DJ Battlecat – scratching (track 10)
- Blair Whitlow – background vocals (track 10)
- Denise Carite – background vocals (track 10)
- Mark Hill – bass (track 11)
- Gordon Mote – piano (track 11)
- Marc Scibilia – background vocals, piano, syntheiszer (track 12)
- Lewis Wright – drums (track 12)

Technical

- Joe Causey – mastering
- Sean Moffitt – mixing (tracks 2, 4–7, 9–12), recording (2, 4–7, 9, 11)
- Chris Lord-Alge – mixing (track 3)
- Serban Ghenea – mixing (track 8)
- Mark Dobson – recording (tracks 2, 4, 6, 10)
- Joe Chiccarelli – recording (tracks 2, 6)
- Justin Niebank – recording (track 3)
- Sam Sumser – recording (track 5)
- Sean Small – recording (track 5)
- Eren Cannata – recording (track 8)
- James Meslin – recording (track 8)
- Topher Wright – recording (track 8)
- Justin Francis – recording (track 10)
- Bryce Bordone – mixing assistance (track 8)
- Joel McKenney – recording assistance (tracks 2, 4–7, 9)
- Bill Mims – recording assistance (tracks 2, 6)
- Sean Badum – recording assistance (track 3)
- Amber Jones – recording assistance (track 8)
- Erica Block – recording assistance (track 10)
- Alex Wilder – recording assistance (track 10)
- Scott Greenblatt – recording assistance (track 12)

Visuals

- Patrick Tracy – art direction, design
- Jordan Curtis Hughes – back cover photo, booklet photos
- Daniel Prakopcyk – cover photo, booklet photos
- Katie Galliher – grooming
- Peter Lamden – grooming
- Wendy Schecter – wardrobe styling
- Amanda Merten – wardrobe styling
- Karen Naff – art production

== Charts ==
=== Weekly charts ===
Weekly chart performance for High
Chart (2024)	Peak position
Australian Albums (ARIA)	3
Australian Country Albums (ARIA)	1
Canadian Albums (Billboard)	71
Scottish Albums (Official Charts)	24
UK Album Downloads (Official Charts)	15
UK Country Albums (Official Charts)	2
US Billboard 200	38
US Top Country Albums (Billboard)	10

=== Year-end charts ===
Year-end chart performance for High
Chart (2024)	Position
Australian Artist Albums (ARIA)	21
Australian Country Albums (ARIA)	27
Chart (2025)	Position
Australian Artist Albums (ARIA)	36
Australian Country Albums (ARIA)	48

== Accolades ==
Year-end lists
Publication	Rank	List
Rolling Stone	28	The 30 Best Country Albums of 2024
