= Straight Line (song) =

2024 song by Keith Urban

Single by Keith Urban

from the album High
- Released: 2 February 2024
- Genre: Country pop; country rock
- Length: 3:46 (album version); 3:35 (US radio edit)
- Label: Hit Red; Capitol Nashville
- Songwriters: Jerry Flowers; Chase McGill; Keith Urban; Greg Wells
- Producers: Keith Urban; Greg Wells

Keith Urban singles chronology
"Street Called Main" (2022)	"Straight Line" (2024)	"Messed Up as Me" (2024)

Lyric video
- "Straight Line" on YouTube

"Straight Line" (stylised in all caps) is a song recorded by Australian-American country music artist Keith Urban. He co-wrote the song with Jerry Flowers, Chase McGill, and Greg Wells, and also produced it with Wells. It is a lead single off Urban's twelfth studio album, High. The song was released to country radio formats in Australia and the United Kingdom in 2024. It was released as the second single in the US and Canada on 21 January 2025.

== Background ==
"Straight Line" was the first song released by Urban in more than a full year. He stated that it was the "perfect first track" off his upcoming album "because it's a song born of wanting to break out of routine and feeling like somewhere along the line, life lost some colour and excitement". Urban added that it "is about getting it back again – a message of taking back your life and driving out from under the dark cloud". He remarked that the song "represents an energy and spirit that became a through line" for the entire album.

== Critical reception ==
Jeremy Chua of Taste of Country described "Straight Line" as an "energetic song", noting a "blend of pop and country influences" as Urban "glides through a catchy melody to celebrate life and fiercely living out one's dreams". An uncredited review from ABC Audio described the song as "an anthemic fresh track".

== Charts ==
=== Weekly charts ===
Weekly chart performance for "Straight Line"
Chart (2024–2025)	Peak position
Australia Country Hot 50 (The Music)	5
Canada Country (Billboard)	21
UK Country Airplay (Radiomonitor)	16
US Country Airplay (Billboard)	18

=== Year-end charts ===
Year-end chart performance for "Straight Line"
Chart (2025)	Position
US Country Airplay (Billboard)	49
