= Somewhere Over Laredo =

Single by Lainey Wilson

from the album Whirlwind
- Released: May 27, 2025
- Genre: Country
- Length: 3:46
- Label: BBR
- Songwriters: Andy Albert; Trannie Anderson; Harold Arlen; Yip Harburg; Dallas Wilson; Lainey Wilson
- Producer: Jay Joyce

Lainey Wilson singles chronology
"4x4xU" (2024)	"Somewhere Over Laredo" (2025)	"The Jesus I Know Now" (2026)

Music video
- "Somewhere Over Laredo" on YouTube

"Somewhere Over Laredo" is a song by American country music singer Lainey Wilson. It was released as a single to country radio impacting on May 27, 2025, from the deluxe re-issue of her fifth studio album, Whirlwind.

== Background ==
Wilson co-wrote "Somewhere Over Laredo" with Andy Albert, Trannie Anderson, and Dallas Wilson. Harold Arlen and Yip Harburg also received writing credits as the song interpolates the melody of "Over the Rainbow", which was originally written for the 1939 film, The Wizard of Oz, and performed by Judy Garland. The title directly references Laredo, Texas and also includes a lyrical nod in the chorus to "Over the Rainbow" with a reference to chasing a "neon rainbow". Wilson said the song was influenced by her downtime flying between shows and "looking out the window, talking to God, dreaming, or even reminiscing".

Wilson began teasing the track on her social media accounts, starting on May 12, 2025. The song was digitally released on May 23, 2025, and Wilson announced the deluxe re-issue of Whirlwind the following day.

== Music video ==
A performance video for "Somewhere Over Laredo" premiered alongside its release. The music video premiered on June 20, 2025, and was directed by TK McKamy.

== Live performances ==
Wilson performed the song live for the first time on the American Music Awards on May 26, 2025.

== Chart performance ==
"Somewhere Over Laredo" was the most-added song at country radio upon release, pulling in 129 first-week stations, and debuted at number 21 on the Billboard Country Airplay chart dated June 7, 2025. It reached number one on the chart dated December 6, 2025, becoming Wilson's fifth number-one single, and the first number one by a solo female artist since her own "Watermelon Moonshine" reached the top in October 2023. It became Wilson's third number one on the UK Country Airplay chart, reaching the top spot on June 8, 2025.

== Charts ==
=== Weekly charts ===
Weekly chart performance for "Somewhere Over Laredo"
Chart (2025)	Peak position
Australia Country Hot 50 (The Music)	2
Canada Hot 100 (Billboard)	53
Canada Country (Billboard)	3
New Zealand Hot Singles (RMNZ)	19
UK Country Airplay (Radiomonitor)	1
UK Singles Downloads (Official Charts)	67
UK Singles Sales (OCC)	70
US Billboard Hot 100	36
US Country Airplay (Billboard)	1
US Hot Country Songs (Billboard)	7

=== Year-end charts ===
Year-end chart performance for "Somewhere Over Laredo"
Chart (2025)	Position
US Country Airplay (Billboard)	54
US Hot Country Songs (Billboard)	51

== Certifications ==
Certifications for "Somewhere Over Laredo"
Region	Certification	Certified units/sales
Canada (Music Canada)	Platinum	80,000^{‡}
^{‡} Sales+streaming figures based on certification alone.
