= Messed Up as Me =

2024 song by Keith Urban

Single by Keith Urban

from the album High
- Released: 1 March 2024
- Genre: Country pop; country rock
- Length: 3:16
- Label: Hit Red; Capitol Nashville
- Songwriters: Jessie Jo Dillon; Shane McAnally; Michael Lotten; Rodney Clawson
- Producers: Keith Urban; Dann Huff

Keith Urban singles chronology
"Straight Line" (2024)	"Messed Up as Me" (2024)	"Go Home W U" (2024)

Music video
- "Messed Up as Me" on YouTube

"Messed Up as Me" (stylised in all caps) is a song recorded and co-produced by Australian-American country music artist Keith Urban. The song was written by Jessie Jo Dillon, Shane McAnally, Michael Lotten, and Rodney Clawson. It was released on 1 March 2024 as the second single from Urban's twelfth studio album, High.

== Background ==
Urban debuted "Messed Up as Me" live on 29 February 2024, during the "Team UMG at the Ryman" show at the annual Country Radio Seminar in Nashville, Tennessee. He described the song material as being about two people in a relationship "who know they aren't good for each other" and that there is "only one good aspect to it. All the rest is completely toxic and dysfunctional. But this one area is [fantastic]. So you put up with all the rest".

== Critical reception ==
Coti Howell of Nashville Noise favourably reviewed the track, describing it as "an instant earworm, despite having an unsettled feeling to it".

== Music video ==
The music video was directed by Patrick Tracy and released on 17 September 2024.

== Charts ==
=== Weekly charts ===
Weekly chart performance for "Messed Up as Me"
Chart (2024)	Peak position
Australia Country Hot 50 (The Music)	11
Canada Country (Billboard)	27
Canada Digital Songs (Billboard)	17
UK Country Airplay (Radiomonitor)	17
US Bubbling Under Hot 100 (Billboard)	3
US Country Airplay (Billboard)	12
US Hot Country Songs (Billboard)	24

=== Year-end charts ===
2024 year-end chart performance for "Messed Up as Me"
Chart (2024)	Position
US Country Airplay (Billboard)	52
