= Trailblazer (song) =

Single by Reba McEntire, Miranda Lambert, and Lainey Wilson
- Released: May 9, 2025
- Genre: Country
- Length: 3:46
- Label: MCA Nashville; Rockin' R
- Songwriters: Brandy Clark; Miranda Lambert; Lainey Wilson
- Producers: Tony Brown; Reba McEntire

Reba McEntire, Miranda Lambert, and Lainey Wilson singles chronology
"Happy's Place" (2024)	"Trailblazer" (2025)	"Heat Wave" (2025)

"Trailblazer" is a song recorded by American country artists Reba McEntire, Miranda Lambert, and Lainey Wilson. Released as a single on May 9, 2025, it was written by Lambert and Wilson alongside Brandy Clark, and was produced and McEntire and Tony Brown. The track is a tribute to female country artists of the past who have opened doors for future generations, and namechecks Dolly Parton, Patsy Cline, Tammy Wynette, and Loretta Lynn, as well as the Grand Ole Opry.

The song was nominated for the Grammy Award for Best Country Duo/Group Performance at the 68th Annual Grammy Awards and Musical Event of the Year at the 61st Academy of Country Music Awards.

== Background ==
Clark, Lambert and Wilson wrote the song together on Lambert's back porch, specifically as a song that the latter pair could sing with McEntire, and described how they would call McEntire on the set on her NBC sitcom Happy's Place in order to work out what they wanted to say. Of the song's message of female solidarity, Wilson stated, “We were just having a conversation about how both [Lambert and McEntire] have influenced me and [about] passing the torch and blazing trails for each other. Generation after generation, it’s going to continue, but we got to keep blazing those trails for the next one.” Wilson also felt that the song had a universally relatable message, describing how “this could be a song that a grandmother and a daughter and a grandchild could listen to.” The song also contains hidden easter eggs to each of the three artists, with lyrics including the word "kerosene", one of Lambert's biggest hits, and "Louisiana" and "Oklahoma", the home states of Wilson and McEntire. All three artists stated that the song is strengthened by their friendship, and spoke of how this camaraderie amongst female country artists helped to inspire each of them despite being from different generations. McEntire cried when she heard the song for the first time, explaining “I remember listening to it in the dressing room. I couldn’t find a flaw in it, not a word. It was that great. I was very emotional when I heard it.”

Despite having performed live together several times, this marks the first official recorded collaboration between McEntire and Lambert, and is also the first collaboration between McEntire and Wilson. It is Lambert and Wilson's second collaboration following "Good Horses", a single from Wilson's 2024 album Whirlwind.

== Live performances ==
The trio performed the song live together for the first time on May 8, 2025, a day prior to its official release, at the 60th Academy of Country Music Awards which were hosted by McEntire. Lambert and Wilson also joined McEntire during her headline set at Nashville's inaugural Music City Rodeo on May 29, 2025.

McEntire, Clark, and Lukas Nelson performed the song as part of the in memoriam at the 68th Annual Grammy Awards on February 1, 2026, McEntire's first ever Grammy performance. Clark re-wrote some of the lyrics to make them less specific to country music and to honor all of the artist, musicians, and industry professionals who had passed away that year, including McEntire's own stepson Brandon Blackstock. A recorded version, titled the "Dream Chaser version", was released on streaming services immediately after their performance.

== Track listing ==
Digital single

- "Trailblazer" – 3:46
- "Trailblazer" (Dream Chaser Version) – 4:11

== Credits and personnel ==
Credits adapted from Tidal.

- Tony Brown – production
- Steve Cordray - engineering
- Chad Cromwell - drums
- Nathan Dantzler - mastering
- Kenny Greenberg - electric guitar
- Aubrey Haynie - fiddle
- John Jarvis - keyboard
- Mike Johnson - steel guitar
- Charlie Judge - keyboard
- Miranda Lambert - vocals
- Steve Marcantonio - recording, mixing
- Reba McEntire - vocals, production
- Ilya Toshinskiy - acoustic guitar
- Brian David Willis - engineering
- Lainey Wilson - vocals
- Glenn Worf - bass

== Charts ==
Chart performance for "Trailblazer"
Chart (2025)	Peak position
US Hot Country Songs (Billboard)	44
