= Drinkaby =

Single by Cole Swindell

from the album Stereotype
- Released: January 30, 2023
- Genre: Country
- Length: 3:04
- Label: Warner
- Songwriters: Jon Pardi; Michael Hardy; Jordan Schmidt; Hunter Phelps
- Producer: Zach Crowell

Cole Swindell singles chronology
"She Had Me at Heads Carolina" (2022)	"Drinkaby" (2023)	"Forever to Me" (2024)

"Drinkaby" is a song by American country music singer Cole Swindell. It was released on January 30, 2023 on the deluxe version of his fourth studio album Stereotype and serves as the album's fourth single. It peaked at 13 in late 2023, which resulted in his second song to miss the top ten.

== Content ==
"Drinkaby" was co-written by Jon Pardi, Michael Hardy, Jordan Schmidt, and Hunter Phelps. Swindell told the blog Taste of Country that he chose to record the song because he "pictured it being a show-opener". The title is a portmanteau of "drink" and "lullaby", referencing the narrator's attempts to "drink away heartbreak". The song is included on Stereotype Broken, a 2023 re-release of his 2022 studio album Stereotype.

== Chart performance ==
=== Weekly charts ===
Weekly chart performance for "Drinkaby"
Chart (2023)	Peak position
Canada Country (Billboard)	4
US Bubbling Under Hot 100 (Billboard)	3
US Country Airplay (Billboard)	13
US Hot Country Songs (Billboard)	22

=== Year-end charts ===
Year-end chart performance for "Drinkaby"
Chart (2023)	Position
US Country Airplay (Billboard)	43
US Hot Country Songs (Billboard)	64
