= Sayin' What I'm Thinkin' =

Studio album by Lainey Wilson
- Released: February 19, 2021
- Studio: Neon Cross
- Genres: Country; neotraditional country
- Length: 37:57
- Label: BBR
- Producer: Jay Joyce

Lainey Wilson chronology
Redneck Hollywood (2019)	Sayin' What I'm Thinkin' (2021)	Bell Bottom Country (2022)

Singles from Sayin' What I'm Thinkin'
- 1. "Dirty Looks" Released: October 3, 2019; 2. "Things a Man Oughta Know" Released: August 24, 2020

Sayin' What I'm Thinkin' is the third studio album by American country music singer Lainey Wilson. It was released on February 19, 2021, by BBR Music Group. Produced by Jay Joyce, the album was Wilson's first album to be released on a major label and contained 12 tracks. The album was the third studio collection released in Wilson's music career and the first issued on a major record label. The disc has since spawned two singles: "Dirty Looks" (2019) and "Things a Man Oughta Know" (2020). The latter release became Wilson's breakout single, reaching chart positions on the country music surveys in North America. Sayin' What I'm Thinkin has since been met with favorable reviews from critics and writers.

== Background ==
Lainey Wilson had been attempting a career as a country music artist for several years. She had previously released the studio album Tougher and played a variety of shows while networking along the way. After signing a publishing deal, she would sign her first major record label contract with the BBR Music Group. In 2019, BBR issued the extended play (EP) Redneck Hollywood. Several of the songs that would appear on Sayin' What I'm Thinkin first appeared on Redneck Hollywood. In crafting the album, Wilson would continually ask herself if the music was "saying what I'm thinking". The phrase was used often enough that she decided to name the album Sayin' What I'm Thinkin'.

== Recording and content ==
Sayin' What I'm Thinkin was recorded at the Neon Cross Studio, which was located in Nashville, Tennessee. The project was produced by Jay Joyce, along with assistance from Court Blankenship. In regards to production, Wilson explained that she and Joyce were "kindred spirits". A total of 12 songs comprised the collection and were all co-written by Wilson. In addition, Jason Nix and Brent Anderson are featured writers on multiple songs in the track listing. Several of the songs on the project were composed as far back as 2018 when Wilson first landed a publishing deal with Sony ATV. "That’s when I started figuring out who I was more—what I wanted to say, and how I wanted to say it," she reflected.

In developing the album's sound, Wilson wanted it to sound "fresh" and "familiar". In an interview with Rolling Stone, Wilson explained that she wanted the disc to have the "pureness of Lee Ann Womack" and the "sassiness of Dolly Parton". Four of the disc's tracks were originally released on Redneck Hollywood: "WWDD", "Dirty Looks", "LA" and "Things a Man Oughta Know". The remaining eight songs were previously not released. The opening track "Neon Diamonds" was chosen as the lead song because it had similarities to a concert opener, according to Wilson. The song "LA" was derived from Wilson explaining to people that she was Louisiana (LA) and not Los Angeles. "I’d meet people and they’d say, 'Where in the world are you from?' as soon as I’d open my mouth. And I’d say 'LA.' And they’d say, 'There’s no way you’re from Los Angeles.'," she commented.

The song "Pipe" was described by Wilson as being her "redneck rulebook". The eighth track "Keeping Bars in Business" was composed after Wilson and her co-writers all experienced different personal tragedies: "We were talking about how even though we were going through things in life, they don’t stop the world from turning," she stated. The tenth track "WWDD" (what would Dolly do) was a written as tribute to Dolly Parton, whom Wilson has been influence by: "Dolly is an international icon and role model for a lot of folks around the world, so it’s an easy song for a lot of people to relate to." The eleventh track "Rolling Stone" was based on the breakup of Wilson and her high school boyfriend. After seven years of dating, the couple realized they were no longer compatible.

== Critical reception ==
Professional ratings
Review scores
Source	Rating
And It Don't Stop	(3-star Honorable Mention)

Sayin' What I'm Thinkin was met with favorable reviews from critics. Mark Deming of AllMusic commented that the album "boasted more polished production but didn't dilute her style." Jon Freeman of Rolling Stone commented, "It sounded like little else this year, and seemed particularly reflective of her singular, unabashedly Southern personality." Jeremy Chua compared Wilson's style on the album to that of Miranda Lambert and Kellie Pickler. Chua further added that "Sayin' What I'm Thinkin is a strong, cohesive introduction to who Lainey Wilson is. A force to be reckoned with, the Louisianan’s stellar album seals her position as a mainstay in country music."

Taste of Country's Billy Dukes also gave the album a positive response. He praised Wilson's songwriting and her "raspy" voice. He also found the album to be genuine in both its production and vocal delivery: "'Authentic' is a one-word review of Sayin' What I'm Thinkin, an album that's intentionally frayed at the edges. Beyond writing and recording songs that satisfy country music fans, she succeeds at introducing her whole self through the music." Pip Ellwood-Hughes of the United Kingdom-based Entertainment Focus praised her songwriting and the honesty in her lyrics. Ellwood-Hughes concluded by saying, "Lainey Wilson has everything a breakout Country star needs and then some, and with any justice this will go down as one of the best records of 2021."

Veteran critic Robert Christgau was more reserved in his praise, highlighting the songs "Dirty Looks" and "Sunday Best" while saying in reference to the album title: "Also what she's drinkin', often with a sexual edge to it, which says plenty for her skill set and not enough for her emotional equilibrium".

== Release, chart performance and singles ==
Sayin' What I'm Thinkin was originally released on February 19, 2021 on the BBR Music Group label. It was originally available to digital and streaming sites. It was later released as both a compact disc and as a vinyl LP. It was the third studio album released in Wilson's music career and her first to be released on a major label. The album was Wilson's second to reach the Billboard Top Country Albums chart. Spending eight weeks on the list, the record peaked at number 40 in October 2021. Two songs had previously been issued as a singles prior to the album's release. The first single was "Dirty Looks", originally issued on October 3, 2019. The second was "Things a Man Oughta Know", which was released on August 24, 2020. The song became her breakout hit in the country field, reaching the top spot of the Billboard Country Airplay chart and the top five of the Billboard Hot Country Songs chart.

== Track listing ==
Sayin' What I'm Thinkin' track listing
No.	Title	Writer(s)	Length
1.	"Neon Diamonds"	Lainey Wilson; Matthew McVaney; Matt Rogers	3:06
2.	"Sunday Best"	Wilson; Brice Long; Shane Minor	3:13
3.	"Things a Man Oughta Know"	Wilson; Jonathan Singleton; Jason Nix	3:23
4.	"Small Town, Girl"	Wilson; Chris Yarber; Dallas Wilson	3:02
5.	"LA"	Wilson; Hannah Dasher; Frank Romano	2:49
6.	"Dirty Looks"	Wilson; Smith Ahnquist; Brent Anderson	3:14
7.	"Pipe"	Wilson; Luke Dick; John Pierce	2:49
8.	"Keeping Bars in Business"	Wilson; Jordan Schmidt; Rogers	3:45
9.	"Straight Up Sideways"	Wilson; Reid Isbell; Nix; Dan Alley	2:56
10.	"WWDD"	Wilson; Casey Beathard; Michael Heeney	2:20
11.	"Rolling Stone"	Wilson; Tammi Kidd; Anderson	3:59
12.	"Sayin' What I'm Thinkin'"	Wilson; Jay Knowles	3:21
Total length:			37:57

== Personnel ==
All credits are adapted from the liner notes of Sayin' What I'm Thinkin'.

- Lainey Wilson – lead vocals, background vocals, gang vocals, handclaps
- Brent Anderson – background vocals
- Tom Bukovac – electric guitar, Fender Rhodes, handclaps
- Fred Eltringham – djembe, drums, bongo, percussion, shaker, tambourine, vibraslap, gang vocals, handclaps
- Aslan Freeman – acoustic guitar, electric guitar, gang vocals, handclaps
- Jason Hall – gang vocals, handclaps
- Jedd Hughes – mandolin
- Joel King – bass guitar, gang vocals, handclaps
- Joanna Janét – background vocals
- Jay Joyce – acoustic guitar, B-3 organ, clavinet, drum machine, electric guitar, Farfisa organ, Fender Rhodes, keyboards, Oberheim, piano, programming, gang vocals, handclaps
- Billy Justineau – B-3 organ, CP-70, piano
- Jimmy Mansfield – gang vocals, handclaps
- Rob McNelley – dobro, electric guitar, gang vocals
- Mickey Raphael – harmonica, Jew's harp
- Matt Rogers – background vocals
- Jonathan Singleton – harmony vocals, background vocals

== Charts ==
=== Weekly charts ===
2021 weekly chart performance for Sayin' What I'm Thinkin'
Chart (2021)	Peak position
US Current Album Sales (Billboard)	94
US Heatseekers Albums (Billboard)	3
US Top Country Albums (Billboard)	40

2024 weekly chart performance for Sayin' What I'm Thinkin'
Chart (2024)	Peak position
Scottish Albums (Official Charts)	74
UK Country Albums (Official Charts)	8

=== Year-end charts ===
Year-end chart performance for Sayin' What I'm Thinkin'
Chart (2021)	Position
US Top Country Albums (Billboard)	86

== Certifications ==
Certifications for Sayin' What I'm Thinkin
Region	Certification	Certified units/sales
United States (RIAA)	Gold	500,000^{‡}
^{‡} Sales+streaming figures based on certification alone.

== Release history ==
Release history and formats for Sayin' What I'm Thinkin'
Region	Date	Format	Label	Ref.
United States	February 19, 2021	Digital download; streaming	BBR	
United States	April 16, 2021	CD; vinyl	BBR	
