= 4x4xU =

Single by Lainey Wilson

from the album Whirlwind
- Released: September 3, 2024
- Genre: Country
- Length: 3:59
- Label: BBR
- Songwriters: Jon Decious; Aaron Raitiere; Lainey Wilson
- Producer: Jay Joyce

Lainey Wilson singles chronology
"Hang Tight Honey" (2024)	"4x4xU" (2024)	"Somewhere Over Laredo" (2025)

Music video
- "4x4xU" on YouTube

"4x4xU" is a song by American country music singer Lainey Wilson. It was released on September 3, 2024, as the second single from her fifth studio album, Whirlwind. It was written by Wilson, Jon Decious, and Aaron Raitiere, and was produced by Jay Joyce.

== Background ==
Wilson co-wrote "4x4xU" with Jon Decious and Aaron Raitiere. Described as a soulful mid-tempo ballad, Wilson said the song is "about finding that someone that gives you the comfort and peace of home anywhere in the world as long as you're by their side". She cited boyfriend, Devlin "Duck" Hodges, as inspiration for the love song: "The truth is, I write what I know, and I finally found a man worth writing about. So you know it's a love song because y'all probably thought, dang, she ain't got it in her, she ain't got it in her... but I do. I got me a cheerleader".

== Live performances ==
Wilson performed the song on The Tonight Show Starring Jimmy Fallon on September 11, 2024.

Wilson performed the song during her time co-hosting the 58th Annual Country Music Association Awards on November 20, 2024. She was joined on stage by her full band and a string ensemble that included all three members of The Accidentals. This version was released as its own live performance single on November 22, 2024.

== Music video ==
The music video for "4x4xU" premiered on July 4, 2024. It was directed by Dano Cerny, and serves as a continuation to Wilson's music video for "Hang Tight Honey". In it, Wilson trades out the tour bus from "Honey" for the shotgun seat of an old pickup truck, with her leaning out the window and counting her gig money as her male co-star drives, focusing on the aftermath of being on tour and home life.

== Chart performance ==
"4x4xU" was the most-added song at the country format upon impact, receiving 65 first-week adds. It debuted on the Billboard Country Airplay chart at number 55, and at number 28 on the Billboard Hot Country Songs chart. It reached a peak of number four on the Billboard Country Airplay chart in February 2025.

== Charts ==
=== Weekly charts ===
Weekly chart performance for "4x4xU"
Chart (2024–2025)	Peak position
Australia Country Hot 50 (The Music)	1
Canada Hot 100 (Billboard)	44
Canada All-Format Airplay (Billboard)	6
Canada Country (Billboard)	1
US Billboard Hot 100	45
US Country Airplay (Billboard)	4
US Hot Country Songs (Billboard)	9

=== Year-end charts ===
Year-end chart performance for "4x4xU"
Chart (2025)	Position
Canada (Canadian Hot 100)	87
Canada Country (Billboard)	10
US Country Airplay (Billboard)	42
US Hot Country Songs (Billboard)	36

== Certifications ==
Region	Certification	Certified units/sales
Canada (Music Canada)	3× Platinum	240,000^{‡}
New Zealand (RMNZ)	Gold	15,000^{‡}
United States (RIAA)	2× Platinum	2,000,000^{‡}
^{‡} Sales+streaming figures based on certification alone.
