= Single Saturday Night =

Single by Cole Swindell

from the album Stereotype
- Released: May 22, 2020
- Genre: Country pop
- Length: 3:07
- Label: Warner Nashville
- Songwriters: Cole Swindell; Mark Holman; Ashley Gorley; Michael Hardy
- Producer: Michael Carter

Cole Swindell singles chronology
"Love You Too Late" (2018)	"Single Saturday Night" (2020)	"Never Say Never" (2021)

"Single Saturday Night" is a song recorded by American country music singer Cole Swindell. It was released on May 22, 2020 as the lead single from his fourth studio album Stereotype. The song was written by Swindell, Mark Holman, Ashley Gorley and Michael Hardy, and produced by Michael Carter.

== Background ==
Swindell commented on the release of ‘Single Saturday Night’: “The past few months have been hard for everyone and I wanted to give the fans something fun to kick off summer.”

== Critical reception ==
ABC News called the song: “uptempo and summer-ready”. Website Taste of Country commented: "is a great way to kick off a weekend."

== Commercial performance ==
The song reached No. 26 on Billboard Hot 100 chart in 2021, becoming Swindell's highest peak since "Chillin' It" in 2013.

== Music video ==
Swindell accepted an interview and said: “I have loved this song since the first listen and wanted to create a video that was just as special!” “We had to get really creative shooting because we were still in quarantine during the COVID-19 pandemic, and it ended being one of the most fun videos I’ve ever done. Because of having that extra time I was able to be really involved in the creative and editing process and this video is a snapshot of my quarantine of trying to tune out all of the bad news and dreaming of being back out on the road at live shows with my band and fans.”

The music video directed by Michael Monaco and Eder Acevedo. It was shot during the COVID-19 pandemic quarantine, Swindell sit on the sofa, slept and heard the news about the COVID-19 pandemic, then he was taken to all over the world, after he woke up, to beach, desert, space and beyond surrounded by his friends and his band. Luke Bryan and Michael Hardy both make a short appearance in the video.

== Charts ==
=== Weekly charts ===
Weekly chart performance for "Single Saturday Night"
Chart (2020–2021)	Peak position
Australia Country Hot 50 (TMN)	6
Canada Hot 100 (Billboard)	59
Canada Country (Billboard)	2
US Billboard Hot 100	26
US Country Airplay (Billboard)	1
US Hot Country Songs (Billboard)	4

=== Year-end charts ===
Year-end chart performance for "Single Saturday Night"
Chart (2021)	Position
US Billboard Hot 100	95
US Country Airplay (Billboard)	4
US Hot Country Songs (Billboard)	23

== Certifications ==
Certifications for "Single Saturday Night"
Region	Certification	Certified units/sales
Canada (Music Canada)	Platinum	80,000^{‡}
United States (RIAA)	Gold	500,000^{‡}
^{‡} Sales+streaming figures based on certification alone.
