= Never Say Never (Cole Swindell and Lainey Wilson song) =

2021 single by Cole Swindell and Lainey Wilson

Single by Cole Swindell and Lainey Wilson

from the album Stereotype
- Written: 2018
- Released: November 19, 2021
- Genre: Country rock
- Length: 2:56
- Label: Warner Nashville
- Songwriters: Jessi Alexander; Chase McGill; Cole Swindell
- Producer: Zach Crowell

Cole Swindell singles chronology
"Single Saturday Night" (2020)	"Never Say Never" (2021)	"She Had Me at Heads Carolina" (2022)

Lainey Wilson singles chronology
"Things a Man Oughta Know" (2020)	"Never Say Never" (2021)	"Heart Like a Truck" (2022)

Music video
- "Never Say Never" on YouTube

"Never Say Never" is a song by American country music singers Cole Swindell and Lainey Wilson. It was released on November 19, 2021, as the second single from Swindell's fourth studio album Stereotype. Swindell co-wrote the song with Jessi Alexander and Chase McGill, and it was produced by Zach Crowell. It peaked at number one on the Billboard Country Airplay chart in April 2022, becoming Swindell's seventh number one single, and Wilson's second.

== Background and content ==
On November 18, 2021, Swindell and Wilson announced the collaboration on social media, "Never Say Never" is the first duet between the two artists. Swindell stated in a press release: "I wrote 'Never Say Never' with Jessi Alexander and Chase McGill in 2018 about a relationship you just can't stay away from, I have been a fan of Lainey Wilson's for a while now and what she brings to this song is everything it needed". Wilson said: "'Things a Man Oughta Know' was such an incredible ride, I can’t wait to get this next song out into the world and see where it leads".

== Composition ==
Billy Dukes of Taste of Country wrote that the producer Zach Crowell "adds a swirl of emotions with steel guitar, keys and a thundering rhythm section" that contrasts Swindell's previous work.

== Critical reception ==
Music and Tour News commented that Wilson's presence "give[s] the stellar song an added dimension" and the two artists "sound absolutely fantastic together on the smash-hit".

== Music video ==
The music video was released on January 12, 2022, and directed by FlyHi Films’ Michael Monaco. The video was filmed in Brushy Mountain State Penitentiary located at the suburb of Knoxville, Tennessee. It tells a story about "a forbidden relationship between a prison guard with an inmate".

== Charts ==
=== Weekly charts ===
Weekly chart performance for "Never Say Never"
Chart (2021–2022)	Peak position
Canada Hot 100 (Billboard)	47
Canada Country (Billboard)	1
US Billboard Hot 100	27
US Country Airplay (Billboard)	1
US Hot Country Songs (Billboard)	2

=== Year-end charts ===
2022 year-end chart performance for "Never Say Never"
Chart (2022)	Position
US Billboard Hot 100	92
US Country Airplay (Billboard)	12
US Hot Country Songs (Billboard)	27

== Certifications ==
Certifications for "Never Say Never"
Region	Certification	Certified units/sales
Canada (Music Canada)	Gold	40,000^{‡}
United States (RIAA)	Platinum	1,000,000^{‡}
^{‡} Sales+streaming figures based on certification alone.

== Release history ==
Release history for "Never Say Never"
Region	Date	Format	Label	Ref.
Various	November 19, 2021	Digital download; streaming	Warner Nashville	
United States	November 22, 2021	Country radio	Warner Nashville	
