= Redneck Hollywood =

EP by Lainey Wilson
- Released: September 13, 2019
- Genre: Country
- Length: 12:29
- Label: BBR
- Producer: Jay Joyce

Lainey Wilson chronology
| Tougher (2016) | Redneck Hollywood (2019) | Sayin' What I'm Thinkin' (2021) |

Singles from Redneck Hollywood
- 1. "Dirty Looks" Released: October 3, 2019; 2. "Things a Man Oughta Know" Released: August 24, 2020

Redneck Hollywood is an extended play (EP) by American country singer Lainey Wilson. It was released on September 13, 2019, via the BBR Music Group and contained four tracks. Two songs from the collection were spawned as singles: "Dirty Looks" (2019) and "Things a Man Oughta Know" (2020).

== Background and content ==
Before Lainey Wilson would have breakout success in 2021 with the song "Things a Man Oughta Know", she released a series of recordings both independently and through other labels. Prior to 2021, Wilson signed with the BBR Music Group and would release her debut extended play (EP) titled Redneck Hollywood. The project was produced by Jay Joyce. The album's title was derived from the track "LA", which references the phrase "redneck Hollywood". The EP was a collection of four tracks, all of which featured co-writing credits from Wilson herself. The opening track "Straight Up Sideways" was described by Wilson as being a "good ole party song". In regards to the second track ("Dirty Looks"), Wilson commented, "In my opinion, there’s nothing sexier than going to grab a beer with your man after he’s been busting his tail at work all day long."

== Release and singles ==
Redneck Hollywood was released on September 13, 2019, through the BBR Music Group. It was Wilson's first release with the label. The disc was offered to digital and streaming sites upon its release. Two singles were spawned from the project, beginning with the second track "Dirty Looks". The song was released to radio on October 3, 2019. The third track "Things a Man Oughta Know" was then released on August 24, 2020. The song became Wilson's first major hit in her career, reaching number one on the American country chart in 2021. In 2021, Wilson would release her first studio album with BBR titled Sayin' What I'm Thinkin'. Both singles would appear on the project as well.

== Track listing ==
Redneck Hollywood
| No. | Title | Writer(s) | Length |
|---|---|---|---|
| 1. | "Straight Up Sideways" | Dan Alley; Reid Isbell; Jason Nix; Lainey Wilson | 2:58 |
| 2. | "Dirty Looks" | Brent Anderson; Smith Ahnquist; Wilson | 3:16 |
| 3. | "Things a Man Oughta Know" | Nix; Jonathan Singleton; Wilson | 3:26 |
| 4. | "LA" | Hannah Dasher; Frank Romano; Wilson | 2:49 |
| Total length: | | | 12:29 |

== Release history ==
| Region | Date | Format | Label | Ref. |
|---|---|---|---|---|
| United States | September 13, 2019 | Digital download; streaming | BBR | |
