= Watermelon Moonshine =

Single by Lainey Wilson

from the album Bell Bottom Country
- Released: May 30, 2023
- Studio: Neon Cross Studios (Nashville)
- Genre: Country
- Length: 3:28
- Label: BBR
- Songwriters: Josh Kear; Jordan Schmidt; Lainey Wilson
- Producer: Jay Joyce

Lainey Wilson singles chronology
"Save Me" (2023)	"Watermelon Moonshine" (2023)	"Wildflowers and Wild Horses" (2023)

Music video
- "Watermelon Moonshine" on YouTube

"Watermelon Moonshine" is a song recorded by American country music singer Lainey Wilson. It was released in May 2023 as the second single from her third studio album, Bell Bottom Country. It was written by Wilson, Josh Kear, and Jordan Schmidt, and was produced by Jay Joyce.

== Background and content ==
Lyrically, "Watermelon Moonshine" is a nostalgic description of a young and reckless love and has been compared to Deana Carter's signature hit "Strawberry Wine" from 1996. Wilson said: "This song embodies what country music means to me, creating a timeless story that will resonate with people for generations to come. This song is about the crazy, young, nostalgic love we all hope to experience".

The track was first released on August 12, 2022, as a promotional single alongside the announcement of Bell Bottom Country.

== Music video ==
The music video was directed by Alexa King Stone and Stephen Kinigopoulos and premiered on July 11, 2023. It stars Rachel Lynn Matthews and Sam Sherrod, who act out the storyline of the song, depicting the unfolding of a young love, while scenes of Wilson performing the song in a field are interspersed as she narrates the story.

A visualizer for the song premiered on August 12, 2022, before its release as a single.

== Chart performance ==
"Watermelon Moonshine" pulled in 63 first-week adds at country radio and debuted at number 55 on the Billboard Country Airplay chart dated June 3, 2023. It later reached number one in October on that chart, making it Wilson's third chart-topper, as well as the first chart-topper by a solo female artist since Wilson's own "Things a Man Oughta Know" two years prior. It also spent two additional weeks at number one on the chart, making it only the third multi-week chart-topper by a solo female in the 2020s, after "The Bones" by Maren Morris and "The Good Ones" by Gabby Barrett. It was certified triple Platinum by RIAA in 2026.

== Charts ==
=== Weekly charts ===
Weekly chart performance for "Watermelon Moonshine"
Chart (2023)	Peak position
Canada Hot 100 (Billboard)	47
Canada Country (Billboard)	1
US Billboard Hot 100	21
US Country Airplay (Billboard)	1
US Hot Country Songs (Billboard)	7

=== Year-end charts ===
2023 year-end chart performance for "Watermelon Moonshine"
Chart (2023)	Position
US Billboard Hot 100	100
US Country Airplay (Billboard)	36
US Hot Country Songs (Billboard)	32

2024 year-end chart performance for "Watermelon Moonshine"
Chart (2024)	Position
US Hot Country Songs (Billboard)	100

== Certifications ==
Certifications for "Watermelon Moonshine"
Region	Certification	Certified units/sales
Australia (ARIA)	Gold	35,000^{‡}
Canada (Music Canada)	Platinum	80,000^{‡}
New Zealand (RMNZ)	Gold	15,000^{‡}
United States (RIAA)	3× Platinum	3,000,000^{‡}
^{‡} Sales+streaming figures based on certification alone.
