= Bell Bottom Country =

Studio album by Lainey Wilson
- Released: October 28, 2022
- Studio: Neon Cross
- Genre: Country
- Length: 56:02
- Label: BBR
- Producer: Jay Joyce

Lainey Wilson chronology
Sayin' What I'm Thinkin' (2021)	Bell Bottom Country (2022)	Whirlwind (2024)

Singles from Bell Bottom Country
- 1. "Heart Like a Truck" Released: May 20, 2022; 2. "Watermelon Moonshine" Released: May 30, 2023; 3. "Wildflowers and Wild Horses" Released: November 13, 2023

Bell Bottom Country is the fourth studio album by American country singer Lainey Wilson. Released on October 28, 2022, by BBR Music Group, the album serves as the follow-up to her third studio album, Sayin' What I'm Thinkin' (2021). It was preceded by the single "Heart Like a Truck". Sonically, the album combines country with elements of '70s rock, funk and soul.

It won Best Country Album at the 66th Annual Grammy Awards, Album of the Year at the 58th Academy of Country Music Awards, and Album of the Year at the 57th Annual Country Music Association Awards.

== Background ==
Wilson co-wrote all of the album's sixteen tracks, with the exception of a cover of "What's Up?", originally recorded by 4 Non Blondes, which Wilson had been performing during her live shows. Sonically, the album has been described as "country at its core", with elements of '70s rock, funk and soul.

The album was announced on August 16, 2022, alongside the promotional single "Watermelon Moonshine". In an interview with Taste Of Country, Wilson explained of the album's title "Sure, I love a good pair of bell bottoms, but Bell Bottom Country to me has always been about the flare and what makes someone unique—I have really embraced mine, and I hope y'all can hear that across this project". Of the short time frame between her debut and sophomore major label albums, Wilson stated ""I've lived quite a bit of life in the past few years, and I have a lot more to say." The song "Those Boots (Deddy's Song)" is a tribute to Wilson's father, who suffered a medical emergency that caused her to cancel a number of live shows.

"Live Off", the album's second promotional single, was released on September 23, 2022, following an acoustic performance of the track that was posted to her Instagram a week earlier. Describing the song, Wilson expressed "this one's one of my favorites off of my new album. 'Live Off' is all about the things that make my world go 'round... my backroad hometown, my dog, my family, my friends, and music, of course."

Upon making her acting debut on Yellowstone in November 2022, Wilson released two new songs—"Smell Like Smoke" and "New Friends"—that were tacked onto the streaming and digital versions of Bell Bottom Country.

"Watermelon Moonshine" and "Wildflowers and Wild Horses" were released as the album's second and third singles, respectively.

== Track listing ==
Bell Bottom Country track listing
No.	Title	Writer(s)	Length
1.	"Smell Like Smoke"	Monty Criswell; Derek George; Lynn Hutton; Lainey Wilson	2:48
2.	"Hillbilly Hippie"	Terri Jo Box; Jeremy Bussey; L. Wilson	3:31
3.	"Road Runner"	Trannie Anderson; Dallas Wilson; L. Wilson	3:46
4.	"Watermelon Moonshine"	Josh Kear; Jordan Schmidt; L. Wilson	3:28
5.	"Grease"	Jessi Alexander; Andrew Petroff; L. Wilson	3:07
6.	"Weak-End"	Nicolette Hayford; Faren Rachels; L. Wilson	3:28
7.	"Me, You, and Jesus"	Emily Weisband; D. Wilson; L. Wilson	3:41
8.	"Hold My Halo"	Criswell; George; Hutton; L. Wilson	3:26
9.	"Heart Like a Truck"	Anderson; D. Wilson; L. Wilson	3:19
10.	"Atta Girl"	Brett Tyler; D. Wilson; L. Wilson	3:26
11.	"This One's Gonna Cost Me"	Hayford; Rachels; L. Wilson	3:13
12.	"Those Boots (Deddy's Song)"	Box; Trent Tomlinson; L. Wilson	2:50
13.	"Live Off"	Anderson; Box; Adam Doleac; L. Wilson	3:35
14.	"Wildflowers and Wild Horses"	Anderson; Paul Sikes; L. Wilson	4:10
15.	"What's Up (What's Going On)"	Linda Perry	3:51
16.	"New Friends"	Park Chisholm; Mark Irwin; L. Wilson	4:15
Total length:			56:02

== Personnel ==
Credits adapted from the album's liner notes.

=== Musicians ===
- Lainey Wilson – lead vocals, claps, background vocals, gang vocals
- Fred Eltringham – drums, timpani, claps, percussion, gang vocals
- Brad Pemberton – drums
- Joel King – bass, claps, gang vocals
- Rob McNelley – electric guitar, acoustic guitar, claps, Dobro, sitar, gang vocals
- Charlie Worsham – acoustic guitar, electric guitar, banjo, mandolin
- Aslan Freeman – acoustic guitar, electric guitar, claps, gang vocals
- Billy Justineau – keyboards, piano, pump organ, B3, Moog, Wurlitzer, Mellotron, Omnichord, gang vocals
- Jay Joyce – acoustic guitar, electric guitar, keyboards, B3, programming, percussion, drums, bass, Dobro, ganjo, background vocals, gang vocals, claps
- Jason Hall – claps, background vocals, gang vocals
- Jimmy Mansfield – claps, gang vocals
- Josh Groppel – claps, gang vocals
- Ashland Craft – background vocals
- Kasey Tyndall – background vocals
- Joanna Janét – background vocals
- Derek George – background vocals
- Molly Tuttle – background vocals, acoustic guitar
- Jason Hargrove – gang vocals

=== Technical ===
- Jay Joyce – production, mixing
- Jason Hall – mixing, recording
- Andrew Mendelson – mastering
- Court Blankenship – production assistance
- Jimmy Mansfield – engineering assistance
- Josh Groppel – engineering assistance
- Jaxon Hargrove – engineering assistance

=== Visuals ===
- Alyse Gafkjen – photography
- CeCe Dawson – creative direction, design

== Charts ==
=== Weekly charts ===
Weekly chart performance for Bell Bottom Country
Chart (2022–2024)	Peak position
Australian Albums (ARIA)	35
Scottish Albums (OCC)	64
UK Country Albums (OCC)	2
UK Independent Albums (OCC)	26
US Billboard 200	51
US Top Country Albums (Billboard)	9

=== Year-end charts ===
2023 year-end chart performance for Bell Bottom Country
Chart (2023)	Position
US Billboard 200	95
US Independent Albums (Billboard)	12
US Top Country Albums (Billboard)	19

2024 year-end chart performance for Bell Bottom Country
Chart (2024)	Position
Australian Country Albums (ARIA)	30
US Billboard 200	128
US Top Country Albums (Billboard)	28

== Certifications ==
Certifications for Bell Bottom Country
Region	Certification	Certified units/sales
Canada (Music Canada)	Gold	40,000^{‡}
United States (RIAA)	Platinum	1,000,000^{‡}
^{‡} Sales+streaming figures based on certification alone.
