= Wildflowers and Wild Horses =

Single by Lainey Wilson

from the album Bell Bottom Country
- Released: November 13, 2023
- Studio: Neon Cross Studios (Nashville)
- Genre: Country
- Length: 4:10 (album version); 3:36 (single version)
- Label: BBR
- Songwriters: Trannie Anderson; Paul Sikes; Lainey Wilson
- Producer: Jay Joyce

Lainey Wilson singles chronology
"Watermelon Moonshine" (2023)	"Wildflowers and Wild Horses" (2023)	"Go Home W U" (2024)

Music video
- "Wildflowers and Wild Horses" on YouTube

"Wildflowers and Wild Horses" is a song recorded by American country music singer Lainey Wilson. It was released on November 13, 2023, as the third single from her third studio album, Bell Bottom Country. It was written by Wilson alongside Trannie Anderson and Paul Sikes, and was produced by Jay Joyce. Wilson performed the track live for the first time at the 57th Annual Country Music Association Awards.

Lyrically, the song delivers a message of perseverance and freedom via the imagery of the American West and relates to Wilson's upbringing in rural Louisiana.

== Background and content ==
Wilson announced her second major label studio album, Bell Bottom Country, on August 16, 2022, with "Wildflowers and Wild Horses" included as the fourteenth track. The album was released on October 28, 2022.

Discussing the single, Wilson explained “This one definitely shows that western side, it takes me back to my childhood. It takes me back to my roots. I come from a long line of hardheaded tough people and people who have kind of blazed their own trails. I’m from five generations of farmers in northeast Louisiana, and I always compare farming to the music business. I mean, you get up every day, do the same thing, you have good years, you have bad years, but you just keep on blazing that trail. So I think it’s just kind of digging a little deeper into my story.”

The song is featured prominently in a Wrangler commercial starring Wilson.

== Music video ==
The music video for "Wildflowers and Wild Horses" was directed by Patrick Tracy and premiered on March 9, 2024. It won Video of the Year at the 58th Annual Country Music Association Awards.

== Chart performance ==
The song first impacted country radio on November 13, 2023, debuting on the Billboard Country Airplay chart at number 53. It was certified Platinum by RIAA in 2026.

== Charts ==
=== Weekly charts ===
Weekly chart performance for "Wildflowers and Wild Horses"
Chart (2023–2024)	Peak position
Australia Country Hot 50 (The Music)	1
Canada Hot 100 (Billboard)	65
Canada Country (Billboard)	1
UK Country Airplay (Radiomonitor)	2
US Billboard Hot 100	48
US Country Airplay (Billboard)	5
US Hot Country Songs (Billboard)	8

=== Year-end charts ===
2024 year-end chart performance for "Wildflowers and Wild Horses"
Chart (2024)	Position
US Country Airplay (Billboard)	38
US Hot Country Songs (Billboard)	35

== Certifications ==
Certifications for "Wildflowers and Wild Horses"
Region	Certification	Certified units/sales
Canada (Music Canada)	Gold	40,000^{‡}
United States (RIAA)	Platinum	1,000,000^{‡}
^{‡} Sales+streaming figures based on certification alone.
