= Go Home W U =

2024 song by Keith Urban

Single by Keith Urban featuring Lainey Wilson

from the album High
- Released: 3 May 2024
- Genre: Country pop
- Length: 3:47
- Label: Hit Red; Capitol Nashville
- Songwriters: Daniel Breland; Keith Urban; Sam Sumser; Sean Small
- Producers: Keith Urban; Sam Sumser; Sean Small

Keith Urban singles chronology
"Messed Up as Me" (2024)	"Go Home W U" (2024)	"Wildside" (2024)

Lainey Wilson singles chronology
"Wildflowers and Wild Horses" (2023)	"Go Home W U" (2024)	"Hang Tight Honey" (2024)

Music video
- "Go Home W U" on YouTube

"Go Home W U" (stylised in all caps) is a song recorded by Australian-American country artist Keith Urban featuring American country artist Lainey Wilson. Urban wrote the song with Breland, Sam Sumser, and Sean Small, and he co-produced it with the latter two. It is the third single to Australian radio from Urban's twelfth studio album, High.

== Background ==
Urban wrote "Go Home W U" with his three co-writers in 2020. He stated that the song started as a "late night drum loop," before he began playing the bass guitar and started playing a riff. Shortly thereafter, the four men wrote the chorus, and then the remainder of the song. Urban remarked that the song was not initially meant to be a duet, but when a friend suggested the idea, he thought that Lainey Wilson worked well with the "swagger and attitude" of it. Wilson called Urban "one of the best" and said that recording a song with him was a "notch on my belt I am very proud of".

== Music video ==
The official music video for "Go Home W U" premiered on YouTube on 3 May 2024. The video includes footage from Urban and Wilson's live debut of the track from the stage of Nissan Stadium at the 2024 CMA Music Festival in Nashville, Tennessee.

== Credits ==
Adapted from AllMusic.

- Breland – background vocals, composition
- Jesse Brock – assistant engineering
- Joe Causey – mastering engineer
- Rose Hutcheson – production coordination
- Scott Johnson – production coordination
- Jase Keithley – assistant engineering
- Joel McKenney – assistant engineering
- Scott Moffitt – engineering, mixing, recording
- Jerry Roe – drums
- Sean Small – background vocals, composition, engineering, production, programming
- Sam Sumser – background vocals, composition, engineering, production, programming
- Keith Urban – background vocals, bass guitar, composition, electric guitar, production, lead vocals
- Lainey Wilson – lead vocals

== Charts ==
Chart performance for "Go Home W U"
Chart (2024)	Peak position
Australia Country Hot 50 (The Music)	1
Canada Digital Songs (Billboard)	21
US Country Digital Songs (Billboard)	7
