= Tougher =

Studio album by Lainey Wilson
- Released: April 8, 2016
- Genre: Country
- Label: Lone Chief
- Producer: Frank Foster

Lainey Wilson chronology
Lainey Wilson (2014)	Tougher (2016)	Redneck Hollywood (2019)

Singles from Tougher
- 1. "Tougher" Released: 2015

Tougher is the second studio album by American country singer Lainey Wilson. It was released on April 8, 2016, via Lone Chief Records and contained 10 tracks. It was the second record released in Wilson's career and her first to gain traction on the American country albums chart. The project's title track was released as the lead single from the album in 2015.

== Background and content ==
Lainey Wilson would later reach breakthrough success with 2020's "Things a Man Oughta Know". Prior to that, Wilson had been performing and recording as a country artist in Nashville, Tennessee for several years. One of the projects she released prior to 2020 was Tougher. The album was recorded between 2015 and 2016 in Nashville, Tennessee. It contained a total of ten tracks and was produced by Frank Foster. The album's title track describes the loss of a friend, a grandfather and Wilson's other experiences during childhood. In an interview with Songwriter Magazine, Wilson reflected on the content of Tougher: "...It’s so cool to go back and listen to the music that I put out years ago. I’m proud of how far I’ve come, and I’m seeing that growth in my writing. But more importantly, just me as a human, the more life you live, the better songs you write."

== Release and chart performance ==
Tougher was preceded by the release of its title track. The song was issued as the lead single off the project in 2015. The album itself was released on April 8, 2016, via the Lone Chief label. It was the second full-length studio album issued in Wilson's music career. It was offered as both a compact disc and as a digital release to platforms which included Apple Music. The album received enough attention where it charted the Billboard Top Country Albums survey. Spending one week on the chart, Tougher peaked at number 44 following its release in April 2021.

== Track listing ==
Tougher
No.	Title	Writer(s)	Length
1.	"Gravel"	Lainey Wilson; Bryan Bayley	4:22
2.	"Caught on Fire"	Wilson; Greg Friia	3:06
3.	"Indian Giver"	Wilson; Friia	3:21
4.	"I Make Myself"	Wilson; Friia	4:34
5.	"Two Sides of Bad"	Wilson; Scott Moffatt	2:50
6.	"One Night Stand"	Wilson; Maxfield Camp; James McNair	3:39
7.	"Let Me Be Your Jesus"	Wilson; Friia	3:55
8.	"Bright Side"	Wilson; Evan Thompson	3:13
9.	"Tougher"	Wilson; Forest Glen Whitehead	3:39
10.	"Where My House Stood" (featuring Frank Foster)	Wilson; Kyndon Oaks	3:53
Total length:			36:32

== Chart performance ==
Chart (2016)	Peak position
US Top Country Albums (Billboard)	44

== Release history ==
Region	Date	Format	Label	Ref.
United States	April 8, 2016	CD; digital download; streaming	Lone Chief	
