= Stereotype (album) =

Studio album by Cole Swindell
- Released: April 8, 2022
- Genre: Country
- Length: 43:42
- Label: Warner Music Nashville
- Producers: Michael Carter; Zach Crowell; Chris LaCorte; Jordan Schmidt

Cole Swindell chronology
All of It (2018)	Stereotype (2022)	Spanish Moss (2025)

Singles from Stereotype
- 1. "Single Saturday Night" Released: May 22, 2020; 2. "Never Say Never" Released: November 19, 2021; 3. "She Had Me at Heads Carolina" Released: June 21, 2022; 4. "Drinkaby" Released: January 30, 2023

Stereotype is the fourth studio album by American country music singer Cole Swindell. It was released on April 8, 2022, via Warner Music Nashville. The album contains the singles "Single Saturday Night" and "Never Say Never".

== Album history ==
Stereotype is Swindell's first studio album since All of It four years prior. Before the album's release, Swindell told American Songwriter that the COVID-19 pandemic allowed him more time for song selection than his previous albums, and that he wanted to "put in something for everybody". The song "She Had Me at Heads Carolina" is a reference to Jo Dee Messina's 1996 debut single "Heads Carolina, Tails California" which changes that song's perspective. Swindell contacted Tim Nichols and Mark D. Sanders, the writers of "Heads Carolina, Tails California", for permission to include elements of that song. According to Swindell, "it sounds a lot like the original song, but the lyrics are changed and it’s a whole different viewpoint".

Zach Crowell, Chris LaCorte, and Jordan Schmidt produced the album with Swindell's usual producer, Michael Carter. Prior to the album's release, it produced two singles; "Single Saturday Night" was the first, reaching number one on the Billboard Country Airplay charts in 2021. The second single is "Never Say Never", a duet with Lainey Wilson.

In advance of the album's release, Swindell released two other songs digitally. The first was "Down to the Bar", a duet with Hardy, on March 15, 2022. Hardy also co-wrote "Single Saturday Night" and "Every Beer" on the album. To support the album, Swindell also began a tour called the Down to the Bar Tour, which lasted from February to April. After this, Swindell released the title track on March 31.

== Track listing ==
Stereotype track listing
No.	Title	Writer(s)	Length
1.	"Stereotype"	Cole Swindell; Michael Hardy; Jordan Schmidt	3:43
2.	"Every Beer"	Swindell; Hardy; Schmidt	3:38
3.	"Never Say Never" (with Lainey Wilson)	Swindell; Jessi Alexander; Chase McGill	2:58
4.	"She Had Me at Heads Carolina"	Swindell; Ashley Gorley; Jesse Frasure; Thomas Rhett; Mark D. Sanders; Tim Nichols	3:27
5.	"Sayin' You Love Me"	Mark Holman; Ernest Keith Smith; James McNair	2:59
6.	"I'm Gonna Let Her"	Dustin Lynch; Justin Ebach; Josh Thompson	2:57
7.	"Down to the Bar" (featuring Hardy)	Swindell; Hardy; Schmidt; Thompson	3:16
8.	"How Is She"	Hunter Phelps; Brock Berryhill; Greylan James	3:34
9.	"Miss Wherever"	Swindell; Chris LaCorte; Luke Laird; Josh Miller	3:27
10.	"Single Saturday Night"	Swindell; Gorley; Hardy; Mark Holman	3:10
11.	"Some Habits"	LaCorte; Miller; Scooter Carusoe	3:37
12.	"Girl Goes Crazy"	Swindell; Hardy; Ross Copperman	3:13
13.	"Walk on Whiskey"	Randy Montana; Rodney Clawson; Jared Mullins	3:43
Total length:			43:42

Stereotype Broken track listing
No.	Title	Writer(s)	Length
1.	"Sad Ass Country Song"	Cole Swindell; Joel Hutsell; Josh Miller; Matt Dragstrem	2:58
2.	"Broken"	Chris LaCorte; Swindell; Cole Taylor; Hillary Lindsay	2:57
3.	"Drinkaby"	Hunter Phelps; Jon Pardi; Jordan Schmidt; Michael Hardy	3:03
17.	"She Had Me at Heads Carolina (Remix)" (featuring Jo Dee Messina)	Swindell; Gorley; Frasure; Rhett; Sanders; Nichols	3:44

== Personnel ==
Musicians

- Renee Blair – background vocals (1)
- Jeff Braun – programming (1, 2, 7)
- Pat Buchanan – electric guitar (10)
- Michael Carter – bass guitar (10), electric guitar (10), keyboards (10), programming (10)
- Ben Caver – background vocals (5, 6, 8, 9, 12, 13)
- Dave Cohen – keyboards (10)
- Zach Crowell – keyboards (4, 6, 8, 9, 11, 13), organ (3), piano (3), programming (3, 4, 6, 8, 9, 11, 13), background vocals (3, 4, 11, 13)
- Kenny Greenberg – electric guitar (3–5, 8, 9)
- Hardy – background vocals (1, 2, 7), featured vocals (7)
- Mark Hill – bass guitar (3, 9)
- Joel Key – acoustic guitar (10)
- Chris LaCorte – electric guitar (5, 12), keyboards (5, 12), programming (5, 12)
- Tony Lucido – bass guitar (7)
- Devin Malone – acoustic guitar (6, 11, 13), electric guitar (3–6, 8, 9, 11–13), ganjo (4), mandolin (4)
- Chris McHugh – drums (3, 9)
- Madeline Merlo – background vocals (4)
- Josh Miller – background vocals (11)
- James Mitchell – electric guitar (10)
- Greg Morrow – drums (10)
- Sol Philcox-Littlefield – electric guitar (4–6, 8, 11–13)
- Danny Rader – acoustic guitar (3, 5, 9, 12), bouzouki (3)
- Scotty Sanders – dobro (4, 6, 8, 9, 11, 13), pedal steel guitar (4, 6, 8, 9, 11, 13)
- Justin Schipper – pedal steel guitar (1, 2, 7)
- Jordan Schmidt – electric guitar (1, 2), programming (1, 2, 7), background vocals (2, 7)
- Jimmie Lee Sloas – bass guitar (4–6, 8, 11–13)
- Cole Swindell – lead vocals (all tracks)
- Russell Terrell – background vocals (10)
- Ilya Toshinsky – acoustic guitar (1, 2, 4, 6–8, 11, 13), banjo (1, 2, 7), dobro (2, 7), electric guitar (1, 2), mandolin (1, 2)
- Derek Wells – electric guitar (7)
- Lainey Wilson – featured vocals (3)
- Mike Wolofsky – bass guitar (10)
- Alex Wright – B-3 organ (1, 2, 7), piano (1, 2, 7), synthesizer (1, 2)
- Nir Z. – drums (1, 2, 4–8, 11–13), percussion (7)

Technical

- Michael Carter – producer (10)
- Zach Crowell – producer (3–6, 8, 9, 11–13)
- Chris LaCorte – producer (5, 8, 13)
- Jordan Schmidt – producer (1, 2, 7)

== Charts ==
=== Weekly charts ===
Weekly chart performance for Stereotype
Chart (2022)	Peak position
Canadian Albums (Billboard)	92
US Billboard 200	48
US Top Country Albums (Billboard)	6

=== Year-end charts ===
2022 year-end chart performance for Stereotype
Chart (2022)	Position
US Billboard 200	168
US Top Country Albums (Billboard)	30

2023 year-end chart performance for Stereotype
Chart (2023)	Position
US Top Country Albums (Billboard)	30

== Certifications ==
Certifications for Stereotype
Region	Certification	Certified units/sales
United States (RIAA)	Gold	500,000^{‡}
^{‡} Sales+streaming figures based on certification alone.
