= Whirlwind (Lainey Wilson album) =

Studio album by Lainey Wilson
- Released: August 23, 2024
- Genre: Country
- Length: 51:47
- Label: BBR
- Producer: Jay Joyce

Lainey Wilson chronology
Bell Bottom Country (2022)	Whirlwind (2024)

Singles from Whirlwind
- 1. "Hang Tight Honey" Released: May 20, 2024; 2. "4x4xU" Released: September 3, 2024; 3. "Somewhere Over Laredo" Released: May 27, 2025

Whirlwind is the fifth studio album by American country singer Lainey Wilson. It was released on August 23, 2024, by BBR Music Group. The album was promoted by three singles "Hang Tight Honey", "4x4xU" and "Somewhere Over Laredo". A deluxe re-issue of the album was released on August 22, 2025.

The album received generally positive reviews by music critics, being prised for its production and lyricism, being recognized with the main awards in the country music genre, including both the Academy of Country Music Award and Country Music Association Award for Album of the Year. Whirlwind was nominated for Best Country Album at the 67th Annual Grammy Awards.

Whirlwind debuted at number eight on the Billboard 200 and number three on the Billboard Top Country Albums chart, becoming the fist Wilson album to debut on the top ten on both the charts. It also became Wilson's first album to debut in Australia, Canada, New Zealand and United Kingdom.

== Background ==
Wilson co-wrote all 14 of the tracks on Whirlwind. Due to her busy schedule, Wilson said she focused on "quality over quantity" with respect to writing songs for Whirlwind, a different approach compared to her past projects. She wrote several songs with The Heart Wranglers, a songwriting collective consisting of herself, Trannie Anderson, and Dallas Wilson, as well as new collaborators such as Jon Decious. The album features a collaboration with Miranda Lambert on "Good Horses", which the two co-wrote with Luke Dick at Lambert's farm in May 2023, and previewed it with a joint performance in Las Vegas ahead of its release.

The album's title and release date were announced on May 9, 2024, with the tracklisting following in June. Her third studio album for BBR Music Group, Wilson once again recruited Jay Joyce to helm production, though this time the singer enlisted her touring band to play on the record instead of utilizing studio musicians. In conjunction with the album announcement, Wilson appeared on the cover of Billboard, premiered the trailer for her Hulu-exclusive documentary, Lainey Wilson: Bell Bottom Country, and shared news that she would be opening the Bell Bottoms Up bar in Nashville.

== Promotion ==
=== Singles and deluxe version ===
"Hang Tight Honey" was released on May 20, 2024, as the album's lead single. "Country's Cool Again", "4x4xU" and "Good Horses" were issued ahead of the album as promotional singles. "4x4xU" was announced alongside the album's release as its second single to country radio, impacting on September 3, 2024. It was the most-added song at the format upon impact, receiving 65 first-week adds.

A deluxe re-issue of Whirlwind was released on August 22, 2025, one year after the album's initial release date. "Somewhere Over Laredo" was released as a single to country radio on May 27, 2025, serving as the third overall single from the album.

=== Tours ===
Wilson embarked on her headlining Country's Cool Again Tour on May 31, 2024, in support of the album. She also performed several tracks from the album on NPR's Tiny Desk series on August 27, 2024. She is currently supporting the album on the Whirlwind World Tour from March 4, to November 8, 2025.

== Critical reception ==
Professional ratings
Review scores
Source	Rating
AllMusic	4/5 stars
Rolling Stone	4/5 stars

Whirlwind received generally positive reviews by music critics.

In a four out of five review, AllMusic's Timothy Monger wrote that Wilson "continues her upward trajectory and tendency to mix rock, pop, and funk" with her country music heritage, finding the track's lyrics "leaner" and "concise", praising Miranda Lambert collaboration. Ranking the album's tracks, Billboard stated that the album's songs are "thoroughly country" and expresse "an artist who has come into herself".

=== Year-end rankings ===
Year-end lists
Publication	Rank	List
Billboard	2	The 10 Best Country Albums of 2024
Rolling Stone	8	The 30 Best Country Albums of 2024
Taste of Country	5	The 10 Best Country Albums of 2024

== Commercial performance ==
Whirlwind debuted at number eight on the Billboard 200 and number three on the Billboard Top Country Albums chart, with first-week totals of 48,000 equivalent units, marking Wilson's first top 10 showing on the former chart and best charting week to date in terms of units.

In United Kingdom Whirlwind debuted at thirteen on the UK Albums Chart, becoming Wilson's first album to chart. The album also debuted at one on the UK Country Albums Chart, becoming Wilson's first number one and her third top ten album. The album also debuted at number three on the Scottish Albums Chart.

In Australia Whirlwind debuted at number nineteen becoming Wilson's first entry on the chart. It peaked at number eight after the deluxe edition in September 2025, becoming Wilson first top ten album.

== Track listing ==
All tracks are written by Lainey Wilson, with additional co-writers noted.

Whirlwind track listing
No.	Title	Writer(s)	Length
1.	"Keep Up with Jones"	Josh Kear; Wyatt McCubbin	3:47
2.	"Country's Cool Again"	Trannie Anderson; Aslan Freeman; Dallas Wilson	3:38
3.	"Good Horses" (featuring Miranda Lambert)	Lambert; Luke Dick	3:57
4.	"Broken Hearts Still Beat"	Blake Pendergrass; Josh Thompson; D. Wilson	2:48
5.	"Whirlwind"	Anderson; D. Wilson	4:00
6.	"Call a Cowboy"	Anderson; D. Wilson	3:47
7.	"Hang Tight Honey"	Jason Nix; Paul Sikes; Driver Williams	3:09
8.	"Bar in Baton Rouge"	Anderson; Kasey Tyndall; Jason Nix	5:07
9.	"Counting Chickens"	Anderson; Jon Decious; Kear; D. Wilson	3:34
10.	"4x4xU"	Decious; Aaron Raitiere	3:59
11.	"Ring Finger"	Decious; Marti Dodson; Raitiere	3:39
12.	"Middle of It"	Anderson; D. Wilson	3:26
13.	"Devil Don't Go There"	Abram Dean; Joe Fox; Lance Miller	3:30
14.	"Whiskey Colored Crayon"	Kear; McCubbin	3:26
Total length:			51:47

Whirlwind — Walmart exclusive version
No.	Title	Writer(s)	Length
15.	"Where the Sun Don't Shine"	Anderson; D. Wilson	3:31
Total length:			55:18

Whirlwind — Deluxe edition
No.	Title	Writer(s)	Length
15.	"Somewhere Over Laredo"	Andy Albert; Anderson; Harold Arlen; Yip Harburg; D. Wilson	3:46
16.	"King Ranch, King George, King James"	Anderson; D. Wilson; Chase McGill	3:12
17.	"Yesterday, All Day, Every Day"	Anderson; Kear; D. Wilson	3:04
18.	"Bell Bottoms Up"	Freeman; Matt Nolan; Kevin Nolan; Tommy Scifres; Meg McRee	3:33
19.	"Peace, Love and Cowboys"	Anderson; Kear; D. Wilson	3:30
Total length:			68:52

== Personnel ==
Credits adapted from the album's liner notes.

- Lainey Wilson – lead vocals
- Fred Eltringham – drums
- Matt Nolan – drums, cuíca, djembe, percussion
- Tommy Scifres – bass
- Aslan Freeman – acoustic guitar, electric guitar, 12-string acoustic guitar
- Rob McNelley – electric guitar, Dobro
- Kevin Nolan – electric guitar, Rhodes, acoustic guitar, mandolin, piano, claps, toy piano, Dobro, 12-string acoustic guitar, synth bass
- Steve Fishell – pedal steel
- Bryan Sutton – acoustic guitar, 12-string acoustic guitar
- Jay Joyce – B3, Omnichord, claps, djembe, programming, Farfisa, keyboards, percussion, background vocals, acoustic guitar, electric guitar, timpani, drums, synth bass, production, mixing
- Wyatt McCubbin – background vocals
- Bobby Louden – backing vocals
- Monroe the Dog – barking
- Miranda Lambert – lead and background vocals on "Good Horses"
- Jason Hall – mixing, recording
- Andrew Mendelson – mastering on all tracks except "Country's Cool Again" and "Hang Tight Honey"
- Pete Lyman – mastering on "Country's Cool Again" and "Hang Tight Honey"
- Jimmy Mansfield – engineering assistance
- Bobby Louden – engineering assistance
- Court Blankenship – production coordination
- Cece Dawson – creative direction, design
- Eric Ryan Anderson – photography

== Charts ==
=== Weekly charts ===
Weekly chart performance for Whirlwind
Chart (2024–2026)	Peak position
Australian Albums (ARIA)	8
Australian Country Albums (ARIA)	1
Canadian Albums (Billboard)	19
New Zealand Albums (RMNZ)	19
Scottish Albums (Official Charts)	3
Swiss Albums (Schweizer Hitparade)	25
UK Albums (Official Charts)	13
UK Country Albums (Official Charts)	1
UK Independent Albums (Official Charts)	2
US Billboard 200	8
US Independent Albums (Billboard)	1
US Top Country Albums (Billboard)	3

=== Year-end charts ===
2024 year-end chart performance for Whirlwind
Chart (2024)	Position
Australian Country Albums (ARIA)	50
US Top Country Albums (Billboard)	65

2025 year-end chart performance for Whirlwind
Chart (2025)	Position
US Top Country Albums (Billboard)	47

== Certifications ==
Certifications for Whirlwind
Region	Certification	Certified units/sales
Canada (Music Canada)	Platinum	80,000^{‡}
United States (RIAA)	Gold	500,000^{‡}
^{‡} Sales+streaming figures based on certification alone.
