= Hang Tight Honey =

Single by Lainey Wilson

from the album Whirlwind
- Released: May 20, 2024
- Genre: Country
- Length: 3:15
- Label: BBR
- Songwriters: Jason Nix; Paul Sikes; Driver Williams; Lainey Wilson
- Producer: Jay Joyce

Lainey Wilson singles chronology
"Go Home W U" (2024)	"Hang Tight Honey" (2024)	"4x4xU" (2024)

Music video
- "Hang Tight Honey" on YouTube

"Hang Tight Honey" is a song recorded by American country music singer Lainey Wilson. It was released in May 2024 as the lead single from her fifth studio album, Whirlwind. It was written by Wilson, Jason Nix, Paul Sikes, and Driver Williams, and was produced by Jay Joyce.

== Background ==
Lyrically, "Hang Tight Honey" was inspired by Wilson's life on the road as a touring performer yearning for home and spending time with her boyfriend, though the melody and beat are described as "infectious" and indicative of Wilson's live set. Wilson co-wrote the "countrified funk-rock hybrid" with Jason Nix, Paul Sikes, and Driver Williams. Wilson spoke on the single saying: "I've been runnin' the roads nonstop for a few years now and I ain't gonna lie to y'all, sometimes it can be tough being away from home that much. At the same time, remembering what 'home' is and the things that I get to do for the ones I love because of the work I put in is what keeps me going and makes it all worthwhile".

It follows promotional single, "Country's Cool Again", which was also included on Whirlwind and shares its name with her headlining tour that began May 31, 2024, in Nashville.

== Live performances ==
Wilson debuted the song live, alongside a cover of "God Blessed Texas", when she opened the 59th Academy of Country Music Awards on May 16, 2024. Wilson performed the song live on the 25th-season finale of The Voice on May 21, 2024, with Reba McEntire surprising her with an invite to become a member of the Grand Ole Opry.

== Music video ==
The music video for "Hang Tight Honey" was directed by Dano Cerny and premiered on July 3, 2024. In it, Wilson is shown in two distinct getups for a vintage variety TV show performance, with a 1960s-inspired pale blue pantsuit with high hair in one look, and Wilson's more traditional regalia of a cowboy hat and bell bottoms in the other. These scenes are interspersed with shots following Wilson and her band as they travel the country in her tour bus. The video ends with a "To Be Continued..." teaser, ahead of the July 4, 2024, premiere for the music video for "4x4xU", another promotional single from Whirlwind.

== Chart performance ==
"Hang Tight Honey" debuted on the Billboard Country Airplay chart at number 23 in May 2024. "Hang Tight Honey" peaked at number 13 on the Billboard Country Airplay chart in July 2024, becoming Wilson's first single to miss the top 10 since her debut single "Dirty Looks". It was certified Gold by RIAA in 2026.

== Charts ==
=== Weekly charts ===
Weekly chart performance for "Hang Tight Honey"
Chart (2024)	Peak position
Canada Hot 100 (Billboard)	81
Canada Country (Billboard)	3
US Billboard Hot 100	61
US Country Airplay (Billboard)	13
US Hot Country Songs (Billboard)	19

=== Year-end charts ===
2024 year-end chart performance for "Hang Tight Honey"
Chart (2024)	Position
US Country Airplay (Billboard)	56
US Hot Country Songs (Billboard)	69

== Certifications ==
Certifications for "Hang Tight Honey"
Region	Certification	Certified units/sales
Canada (Music Canada)	Platinum	80,000^{‡}
United States (RIAA)	Gold	500,000^{‡}
^{‡} Sales+streaming figures based on certification alone.
