= Heart Like a Truck =

2022 single by Lainey Wilson

Single by Lainey Wilson

from the album Bell Bottom Country
- Released: May 20, 2022
- Studio: Neon Cross Studios (Nashville)
- Genre: Country
- Length: 3:19
- Label: Broken Bow
- Songwriters: Trannie Anderson; Dallas Wilson; Lainey Wilson
- Producer: Jay Joyce

Lainey Wilson singles chronology
"Never Say Never" (2022)	"Heart Like a Truck" (2022)	"Wait in the Truck" (2022)

Music video
- "Heart Like a Truck" on YouTube

"Heart Like a Truck" is a song recorded by American country music singer Lainey Wilson. It was released in May 2022 as the lead single from her third studio album, Bell Bottom Country. It was written by Wilson, Trannie Anderson and Dallas Wilson, and was produced by Jay Joyce. Described as a "song about triumph", the track has received praise for Wilson's passionate and powerful vocals and for its poignant and raw lyrics. The song reached number 2 for two weeks on the Country Airplay chart and certified four-times Platinum by RIAA.

== Background ==
Lyrically, the song compares her heart to a truck and is about acknowledging that it is okay to experience heartache and to remember to keep on going. In a statement accompanying the song's release, Wilson explained “This is a song about finding freedom in strength, and not being afraid of your scars and bruises. A truck that has hit a few bumps and earned a few scratches has proved itself and its tenacity…the shiny one on the lot can’t say that.” Wilson noted that her father and his upbringing of her helped to inspire the song.

Discussing the writing process with Absolute Radio Country, Wilson explained “I wrote it with two of my dear friends Dallas Wilson and Trannie Anderson, they’re incredible songwriters, we call ourselves The Heart Wranglers, we go on retreats together. We sat down to write that day in the thick of the pandemic and we were talking about all the different things that we were going through, and Trannie had this idea, Heart Like a Truck, and I was like cool, I got one of those. We decided to write it in a way that was vulnerable and tells a story but not so much about where I’ve been but more importantly where I'm going. It’s a song about finding freedom in strength. Not being afraid of the scars and the bruises and the bumps along the way. That makes you who you are. It builds character.”

Shortly after the song's release in May 2022, Wilson performed it on The Tonight Show Starring Jimmy Fallon. On October 14, Wilson performed the song live at the CMT Artists of the Year ceremony where she received the Breakthrough Artist award.

== Music video ==
The video for the song was directed by Elizabeth Olmstead and stars Wilson as a stable hand who is brought in to earn the trust of a free-spirited pony that no one else has been able to tame. Through time, care and patience, Wilson is able to get through the difficult period and eventually rides the horse around the farm, which is designed to mirror her own approach to relationships. Rolling Stone described the video as "cinematic".

It won Female Video of the Year at the 2023 CMT Music Awards.

== Charts ==
=== Weekly charts ===
Weekly chart performance for "Heart Like a Truck"
Chart (2022–2023)	Peak position
Canada Hot 100 (Billboard)	53
Canada Country (Billboard)	1
Global 200 (Billboard)	190
US Billboard Hot 100	29
US Country Airplay (Billboard)	2
US Hot Country Songs (Billboard)	7

=== Year-end charts ===
2022 year-end chart performance for "Heart Like a Truck"
Chart (2022)	Position
US Hot Country Songs (Billboard)	100

2023 year-end chart performance for "Heart Like a Truck"
Chart (2023)	Position
US Billboard Hot 100	58
US Country Airplay (Billboard)	13
US Hot Country Songs (Billboard)	18

== Certifications ==
Certifications for "Heart Like a Truck"
Region	Certification	Certified units/sales
Australia (ARIA)	Gold	35,000^{‡}
Canada (Music Canada)	2× Platinum	160,000^{‡}
New Zealand (RMNZ)	Gold	15,000^{‡}
United States (RIAA)	4× Platinum	4,000,000^{‡}
^{‡} Sales+streaming figures based on certification alone.
