= Things a Man Oughta Know =

2020 single by Lainey Wilson

Single by Lainey Wilson

from the EP Redneck Hollywood and the album Sayin' What I'm Thinkin'
- Released: August 24, 2020
- Studio: Neon Cross Studios (Nashville)
- Genre: Country
- Length: 3:26
- Label: Broken Bow
- Songwriters: Lainey Wilson; Jason Nix; Jonathan Singleton
- Producer: Jay Joyce

Lainey Wilson singles chronology
"Dirty Looks" (2019)	"Things a Man Oughta Know" (2020)	"Never Say Never" (2021)

Music video
- "Things a Man Oughta Know" on YouTube

"Things a Man Oughta Know" is a song recorded by American country music singer Lainey Wilson. It was released in August 2020 as the second single from Wilson's Redneck Hollywood EP and would later be included on her 2021 album Sayin' What I'm Thinkin'. The song was written by Wilson, Jason Nix and Jonathan Singleton, and produced by Jay Joyce.

== Content ==
Wilson accepted an interview to Digital Journal, and mentioned she wrote it with Jason Nix and Jonathan Singleton: “We really spoke about all the things that we thought a man oughta know. The list was way too long so we condensed that list. We discussed my childhood and the things that my parents taught me growing up. This song is really about having good character.”

== Music video ==
The music video was released on April 2, 2021, co-directed by Sean O’Halloran and Chris Ashlee. It was shot in Wilson’s own home partially, and filled with personal elements and close friends.

Wilson mentioned in a statement: “I hoped that people would connect to this song and it’s been so incredible to see just how strong the reaction has been. For the music video, we wanted to create a piece of art where people could watch it and feel something all over again.”

== Chart performance ==
The song reached No. 3 on the Hot Country Songs chart, and reached No. 1 on the Country Airplay chart, becoming Wilson's first number-one song. It was certified triple Platinum by RIAA in 2026.

== Charts ==
=== Weekly charts ===
Weekly chart performance for "Things a Man Oughta Know"
Chart (2020–2021)	Peak position
Australia Country Hot 50 (TMN)	16
Canada Hot 100 (Billboard)	65
Canada Country (Billboard)	4
US Billboard Hot 100	32
US Country Airplay (Billboard)	1
US Hot Country Songs (Billboard)	3

=== Year-end charts ===
Year-end chart performance for "Things a Man Oughta Know"
Chart (2021)	Position
US Billboard Hot 100	96
US Country Airplay (Billboard)	13
US Hot Country Songs (Billboard)	17

== Certifications ==
Certifications for "Things a Man Oughta Know"
Region	Certification	Certified units/sales
Canada (Music Canada)	2× Platinum	160,000^{‡}
New Zealand (RMNZ)	Gold	15,000^{‡}
United States (RIAA)	3× Platinum	3,000,000^{‡}
^{‡} Sales+streaming figures based on certification alone.
