= Lainey Wilson =

American country singer (born 1992)

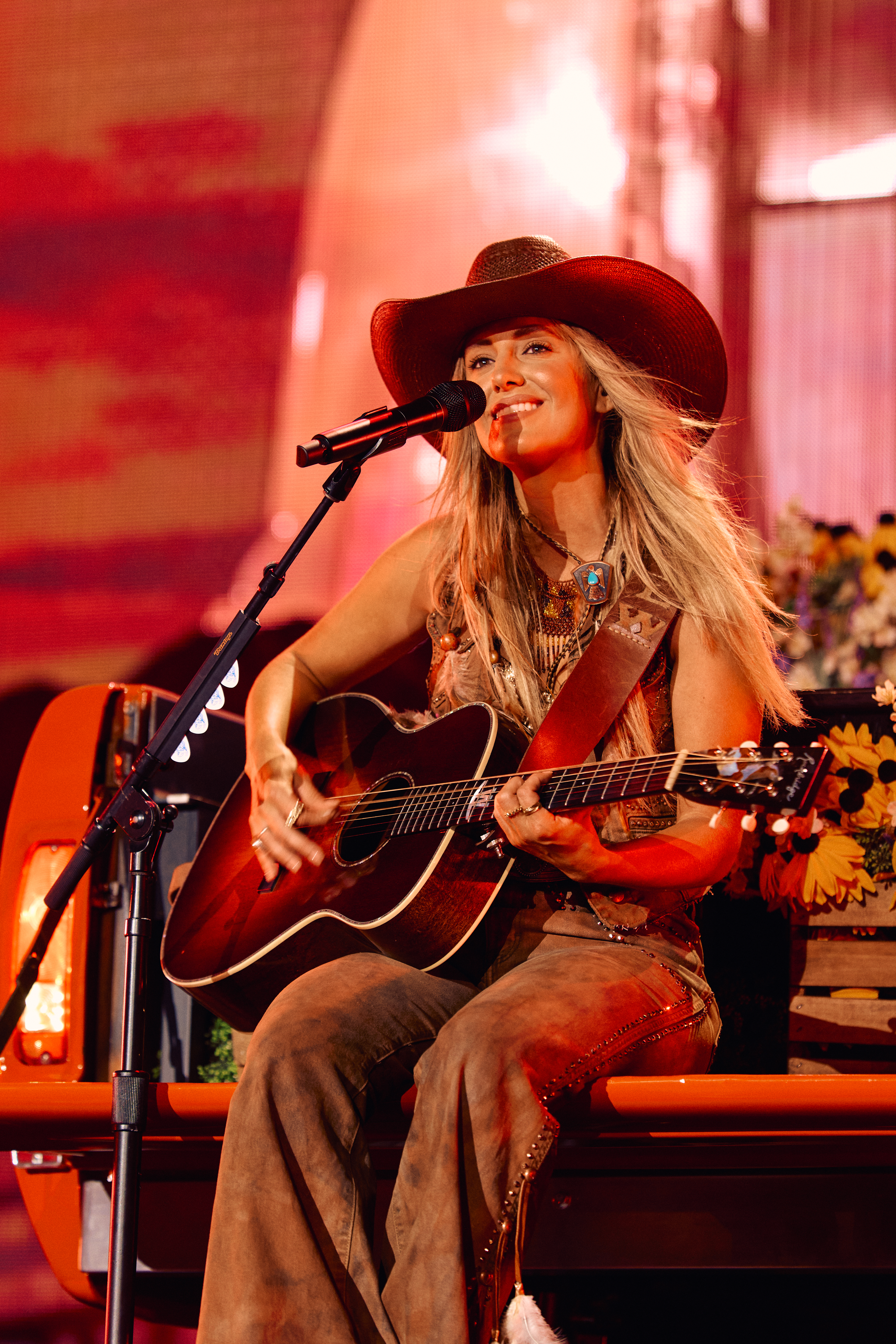
- Wilson in 2024

Background information
- Born: May 19, 1992 (age 34); Baskin, Louisiana, U.S.
- Origin: Nashville, Tennessee, U.S.
- Genre: Country
- Occupations: Singer-songwriter; actress
- Instruments: Vocals; Guitar; Piano; Harmonica
- Works: Lainey Wilson discography
- Years active: 2011–present
- Labels: Cupit; Lone Chief; BBR
- Spouse: Devlin "Duck" Hodges (m. 2026)
- Website: laineywilson.com

Lainey Wilson (born May 19, 1992) is an American singer-songwriter and actress. She performed at an early age, before going to Nashville to pursue a career in country music. Grammy Award winner, she was recognized with sixteen Academy of Country Music Awards and twelve Country Music Association Awards, including winning their top honor Entertainer of the Year in 2023 and 2025.

In 2014, she released her self-titled debut album on Cupit Records, followed by her second album Tougher on Lone Chief in 2016. Wilson secured a publishing deal and later released an extended play (EP) in 2019 which included the song "Things a Man Oughta Know". In 2020, it was issued as a single through the BBR Music Group and reached number one on the American country songs chart, releasing her third album Sayin' What I'm Thinkin' in 2021.

Wilson fourth studio album Bell Bottom Country (2022) become her first Billboard 200 charting album, being recognized at the 66th Annual Grammy Awards for Best Country Album. In 2024 she published fifth album Whirlwind, becoming her most successful album on the international charts, including placements in the United Kingdom and Australia, and her first top-ten entry on the Billboard 200.

In 2022, she made her TV series debut in Yellowstone playing the part of Abby. In 2024, she was in the country music documentary Rebel Country. In 2026, she made her film debut in the film adaptation of Colleen Hoover’s book Reminders of Him, where she played Amy Matthews. Wilson also wrote and performed the original song "Out of Oklahoma" from Twisters (2024), being nominated at the Society of Composers & Lyricists Awards and Guild of Music Supervisors Awards.

== Early life and education ==
Lainey Wilson was born on May 19, 1992 and raised in Baskin, Louisiana, a town of 170 people. Her father, Brian, was a farmer while her mother, Michelle, was a schoolteacher. She also has a sister, Janna. She became interested in music at a young age. Her family often listened to classic country music by Buck Owens and Glen Campbell.

At age nine, she attended a performance of the Grand Ole Opry and was drawn to the music. Wilson's father taught her a couple of chords and she was writing songs by her pre-teen years.

In 2006, she released an EP on Myspace titled Country Girls Rule. In high school, Wilson took a job impersonating Hannah Montana. Often booking her own shows, she performed as Hannah Montana at birthday parties, fairs, and festivals across Louisiana, Mississippi, and Arkansas, even once performing for child cancer patients at St. Jude Children's Research Hospital.

== Career ==
=== 2011–2018: Early years in Nashville and independent releases ===
Wilson graduated from high school and moved to Nashville in August 2011. She first lived in a camper trailer outside of a recording studio in Nashville. The studio owner paid for Wilson's water and electricity to help make ends meet. In 2021, Wilson said that her early years in Nashville were difficult: "It taught me that this thing was not going to be easy. It taught me perseverance." For several years, Wilson played a variety of small shows and worked on her songwriting. In 2014, she released a self-titled album on the Cupit label. It was followed in 2016 by Tougher, on the Lone Chief label. The project garnered an audience and made the Billboard Top Country Albums chart. Wilson also performed with Kasey Tyndall as members of the duo Loretta Jett, including a November 2016 show at the Mercury Ballroom in Louisville, Kentucky. In 2018, she released her second EP, a self-titled collection that was self-released. It led to her signing a publishing deal with Sony/ATV in 2018. Also in 2018, she also signed a management deal.

=== 2019–2021: Breakout success with "Things a Man Oughta Know" ===
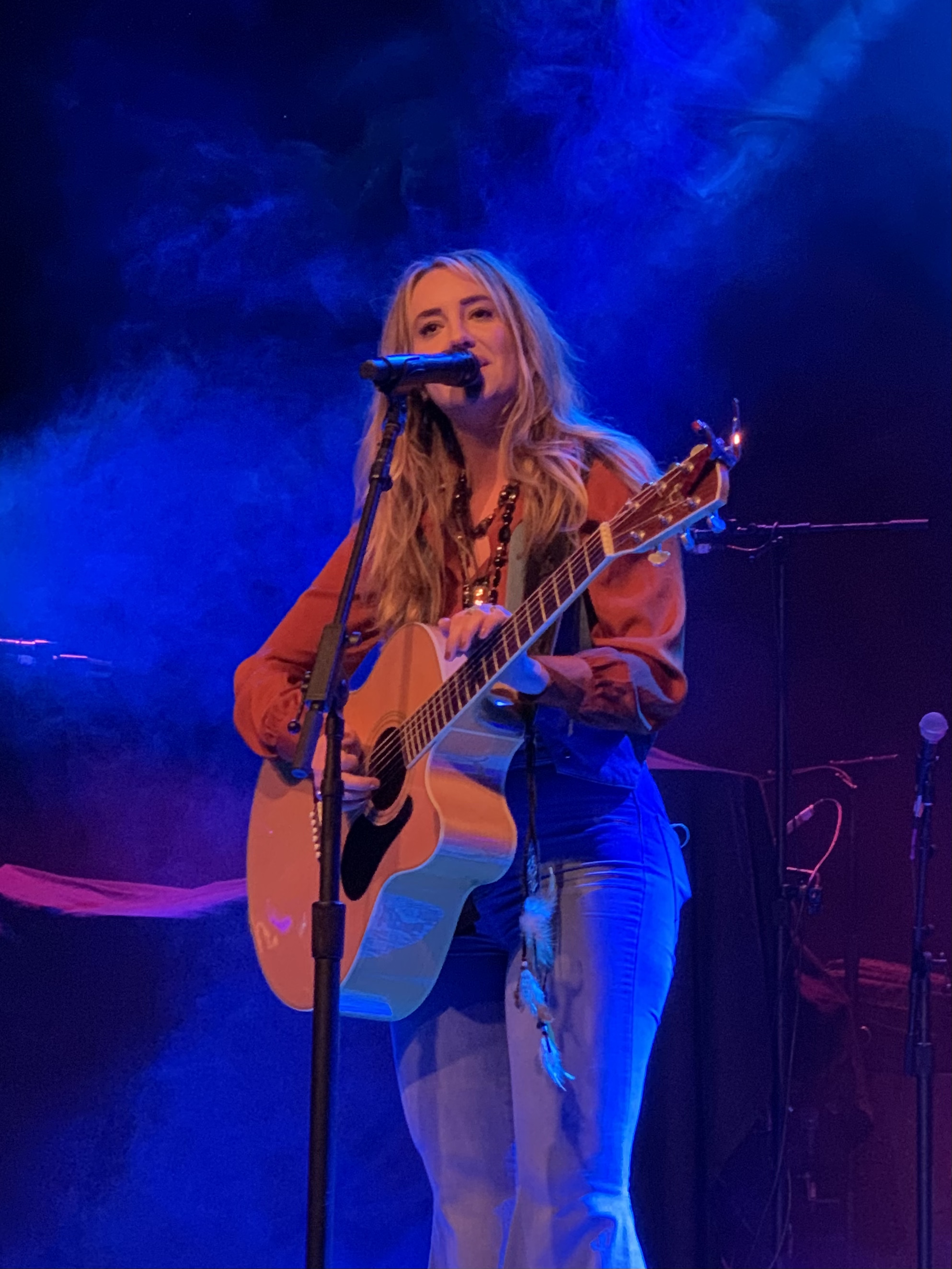
Wilson in concert in 2020

In 2018, Wilson signed a major-label recording contract with the BBR Music Group. Her first major-label release was her third EP Redneck Hollywood (2019). Her debut major label single was also released in 2019: "Dirty Looks". Off the Record UK praised the EP, highlighting Wilson's songwriting and the production from producer Jay Joyce. The publication said, "The EP is raw and real, pushing the country music genre wider than ever and bringing it back to the traditional while still reinventing it to its modern surroundings." Next she received attention from Country Music Television, who included her in their "Listen Up" Class of 2019 and on their "2019 CMT Next Women of Country" tour. She also toured with Morgan Wallen in 2019. During this same period, several of her songs were featured in the Paramount Network show Yellowstone.

In August 2020, the BBR label issued Wilson's next single to radio: "Things a Man Oughta Know". The track gained heavy media attention from sites like YouTube, Apple Music, iHeart Radio, Spotify, and Pandora. By 2021, "Things a Man Oughta Know" became her breakout single, reaching number one on Billboard Country Airplay and number three on Hot Country Songs. It was included on her third studio album Sayin' What I'm Thinkin' (2021). The disc was her first full-length album issued on BBR and contained 12 tracks. It was her second to reach the Billboard country albums chart, peaking at number 40. The disc received positive reviews. "Beyond writing and recording songs that satisfy country music fans, she succeeds at introducing her whole self through the music," concluded Taste of Country's Billy Dukes. Entertainment Focus commented, "The rising star knocks it out of the park with her new album."

Wilson appeared as a supporting act on Jason Aldean's "Back in the Saddle Tour" in 2021. The same year, Wilson collaborated with Cole Swindell on his single "Never Say Never". The duet was released as the second single from Swindell's fourth studio album Stereotype, and became Wilson's second single to top the Billboard country chart.

=== 2022–present: Acting debut and Whirlwind ===
It was followed by her 2022 solo single titled "Heart Like a Truck", then the album Bell Bottom Country. Wilson received a leading six nominations at the 56th Annual Country Music Association Awards, becoming the fourth artist to receive six or more nominations as a first-time nominee. Wilson also joined the cast of Yellowstone in 2022, with some of her songs also being featured in the series. She was a co-writer on the 2023 single "Chasing Tornadoes" by fellow country artist MacKenzie Porter. Wilson received a leading nine nominations at the 57th Annual Country Music Association Awards in 2023, winning five including the top honor Entertainer of the Year. She was the first woman to win Entertainer of the Year since Taylor Swift in 2009. In 2024, she featured on Keith Urban's song "Go Home W U".

On May 9, 2024, Wilson announced that her fifth album Whirlwind was released on August 23, 2024. "Hang Tight Honey" was released as its lead single to country radio on May 20, 2024. That same month, Wilson was featured on a new version of "Poor Poor Pitiful Me" with Terri Clark, from Clark's album Terri Clark: Take Two. In 2024, Whirlwind was nominated for Grammy Award for Best Country Album at the 67th Annual Grammy Awards, to take place in 2025. Wilson's "Out of Oklahoma" won Best Music Video at the 15th Hollywood Music in Media Awards. In 2026, Wilson made her feature film acting debut in Reminders of Him, a film adaptation of Colleen Hoover's novel of the same name. On April 17, 2026, she released "Younger You" with Miley Cyrus, a duet version of Cyrus's single.

== Influences ==
Wilson's musical style is rooted in country music, but also incorporates elements of pop, southern rock, contemporary country, and classic country. In describing her music, AllMusic's Mark Deming commented, "Wilson's voice is clear and strong, with an unapologetic Southern accent, and her songs are tough but heartfelt contemporary country with an edge that has its roots in vintage Southern rock and classic rock, as well as a dash of modern-day pop." In describing her own musical style, Wilson characterized it as "bell-bottom country", which Taste of Country called "a cross between easy listening and hard truths." Wilson has been heavily influenced by Dolly Parton, paying tribute to her in the self-composed track "WWDD" (What Would Dolly Do). Wilson credits Lee Ann Womack as an influence on her career and music.

== Personal life ==
In 2022, Wilson's father, Brian Wilson, experienced severe health issues including a stroke and a fungal infection which resulted in the removal of his left eye. This all occurred while she was filming her first season on Yellowstone. Wanting to be closer to him, she considered quitting the show. However, her father encouraged her to continue filming regardless of his health outlook. He eventually recovered and was seen accompanying her on the red carpet at the 56th CMA Awards.

In late 2022, Wilson became the subject of a viral trend that occurred on social media, predominantly on TikTok. A video of her performing at a concert spread very quickly on the platform. As a result of the angle of the camera and the leopard print pants Wilson was wearing, users felt the video was very flattering to the size and shape of her buttocks. The resulting trend saw users posting additional videos, pictures, and comments expressing admiration for Wilson's figure. For her part, Lainey acknowledged the trend and has largely responded to it with humor. She made jokes about it and also expressed hope that many people who only knew about her because of the posts would be inspired to listen to her music and become fans.

External videos
- Tour of Wilson's home for Architectural Digest

In May 2023, Wilson was confirmed to be in a relationship with former National Football League (NFL) quarterback Devlin "Duck" Hodges. Wilson later revealed in an interview with The Bobby Bones Show that she and Hodges had been dating for over two years prior to the public knowing about it. Both Hodges and Wilson support the Pittsburgh Steelers, because Hodges used to play quarterback for them. In February 2025, Wilson and Hodges announced their engagement. On May 10, 2026, the pair married.

On May 31, 2024, Wilson opened Bell Bottoms Up, a three-story bar, Cajun restaurant and music venue in downtown Nashville.

Wilson is a long-time supporter of St. Jude Children's Research Hospital.

== Discography ==
Studio albums

- Lainey Wilson (2014)
- Tougher (2016)
- Sayin' What I'm Thinkin' (2021)
- Bell Bottom Country (2022)
- Whirlwind (2024)

== Tours ==
Headlining

- Country with a Flair Tour (2023)
- Country's Cool Again Tour (2024)
- Whirlwind World Tour (2025)

Supporting

- Back in the Saddle Tour (2021) (with Jason Aldean)
- Beers on Me Tour (2022) (with Dierks Bentley)
- Ain't Always the Cowboy Tour (2022) (with Jon Pardi)
- Dangerous Tour (2022) (with Morgan Wallen)
- Luke Combs World Tour (2023) (with Luke Combs)

== Filmography ==
Year	Title	Role	Notes	Ref.
2022	Yellowstone	Abby	TV series; season 5	
2024	Rebel Country	Herself	Country music documentary	
2026	Leanne	Jessie	TV series; seasons 2	
2026	Reminders of Him	Amy		

== Awards and nominations ==
Award	Year	Category	Nominee(s) / Work(s)	Result	Ref.
Academy of Country Music Awards	2022	Song of the Year	"Things a Man Oughta Know"	Won	
Academy of Country Music Awards	2022	New Female Artist of the Year	Herself	Won	
Academy of Country Music Awards	2023	Album of the Year	Bell Bottom Country	Won	
Academy of Country Music Awards	2023	Female Artist of the Year	Herself	Won	
Academy of Country Music Awards	2023	Single of the Year	"Heart Like a Truck"	Nominated	
Academy of Country Music Awards	2023	Music Event of the Year	"Wait in the Truck" (with Hardy)	Won	
Academy of Country Music Awards	2023	Visual Media of the Year	"Wait in the Truck" (with Hardy)	Won	
Academy of Country Music Awards	2023	Tex Ritter Film Award	Yellowstone	Honoree	
Academy of Country Music Awards	2024	Entertainer of the Year	Herself	Won	
Academy of Country Music Awards	2024	Female Artist of the Year	Herself	Won	
Academy of Country Music Awards	2024	Song of the Year	"Heart Like a Truck"	Nominated	
Academy of Country Music Awards	2024	Music Event of the Year	"Save Me" (with Jelly Roll)	Won	
Academy of Country Music Awards	2025	Entertainer of the Year	Herself	Won	
Academy of Country Music Awards	2025	Female Artist of the Year	Herself	Won	
Academy of Country Music Awards	2025	Artist-Songwriter of the Year	Herself	Won	
Academy of Country Music Awards	2025	Milestone Award	Herself	Honored	
Academy of Country Music Awards	2025	Triple Crown Award	Herself	Honored	
Academy of Country Music Awards	2025	Album of the Year	Whirlwind	Won	
Academy of Country Music Awards	2025	Song of the Year	"4x4xU"	Nominated	
Academy of Country Music Awards	2025	Visual Media of the Year	"4x4xU"	Nominated	
Academy of Country Music Awards	2026	Entertainer of the Year	Herself	Nominated	
Academy of Country Music Awards	2026	Female Artist of the Year	Herself	Nominated	
Academy of Country Music Awards	2026	Single of the Year	"Somewhere Over Laredo"	Nominated	
Academy of Country Music Awards	2026	Song of the Year	"Somewhere Over Laredo"	Nominated	
Academy of Country Music Awards	2026	Visual Media of the Year	"Somewhere Over Laredo"	Nominated	
Academy of Country Music Awards	2026	Music Event of the Year	"Trailblazer" (with Reba McEntire and Miranda Lambert)	Nominated	
American Music Awards	2022	Favorite Female Country Artist	Herself	Nominated	
American Music Awards	2025	Favorite Female Country Artist	Herself	Nominated	
American Music Awards	2026	Best Female Country Artist	Herself	Nominated	
Billboard Music Awards	2023	Top Country Female Artist	Herself	Nominated	
Billboard Music Awards	2024	Top Country Female Artist	Herself	Nominated	
CMT Music Awards	2021	Breakthrough Video of the Year	"Things a Man Oughta Know"	Nominated	
CMT Music Awards	2022	CMT Digital-First Performance of the Year	"Things a Man Oughta Know"	Nominated	
CMT Music Awards	2023	Video of the Year	"Wait in the Truck" (with Hardy)	Nominated	
CMT Music Awards	2023	Collaborative Video of the Year	"Wait in the Truck" (with Hardy)	Won	
CMT Music Awards	2023	Female Video of the Year	"Heart Like a Truck"	Won	
CMT Music Awards	2023	CMT Performance of the Year	"Never Say Never" (with Cole Swindell)	Nominated	
CMT Music Awards	2024	Female Video of the Year	"Watermelon Moonshine"	Won	
CMT Music Awards	2024	Collaborative Video of the Year	"More Than Friends" (with Lukas Nelson & Promise of the Real)	Nominated	
Country Music Association Awards	2023	Album of the Year	Sayin' What I'm Thinkin'	Nominated	
Country Music Association Awards	2023	Female Vocalist of the Year	Herself	Won	
Country Music Association Awards	2023	New Artist of the Year	Herself	Won	
Country Music Association Awards	2023	Song of the Year	"Things a Man Oughta Know"	Nominated	
Country Music Association Awards	2023	Music Video of the Year	"Never Say Never" (with Cole Swindell)	Nominated	
Country Music Association Awards	2023	Musical Event of the Year	"Never Say Never" (with Cole Swindell)	Nominated	
Country Music Association Awards	2023	Entertainer of the Year	Herself	Won	
Country Music Association Awards	2023	Female Vocalist of the Year	Herself	Won	
Country Music Association Awards	2023	Album of the Year	Bell Bottom Country	Won	
Country Music Association Awards	2023	Song of the Year	"Heart Like a Truck"	Nominated	
Country Music Association Awards	2023	Single of the Year	"Heart Like a Truck"	Nominated	
Country Music Association Awards	2023	Single of the Year	"Wait in the Truck" (with Hardy)	Nominated	
Country Music Association Awards	2023	Music Video of the Year	"Wait in the Truck" (with Hardy)	Won	
Country Music Association Awards	2023	Musical Event of the Year	"Wait in the Truck" (with Hardy)	Won	
Country Music Association Awards	2023	Musical Event of the Year	"Save Me" (with Jelly Roll)	Nominated	
Country Music Association Awards	2024	Entertainer of the Year	Herself	Nominated	
Country Music Association Awards	2024	Female Vocalist of the Year	Herself	Won	
Country Music Association Awards	2024	Single of the Year	"Watermelon Moonshine"	Nominated	
Country Music Association Awards	2024	Music Video of the Year	"Wildflowers and Wild Horses"	Won	
Country Music Association Awards	2025	Entertainer of the Year	Herself	Won	
Country Music Association Awards	2025	Female Vocalist of the Year	Herself	Won	
Country Music Association Awards	2025	Album of the Year	Whirlwind	Won	
Country Music Association Awards	2025	Single of the Year	"4x4xU"	Nominated	
Country Music Association Awards	2025	Song of the Year		Nominated	
Country Music Association Awards	2025	Music Video of the Year	"Somewhere Over Laredo"	Nominated	
Country Music Association Awards	2026	International Artist Achievement Award	Herself	Pending	
Country Music Association Awards	2026	Entertainer of the Year	Herself	Nominated	
Country Music Association Awards	2026	Female Vocalist of the Year	Herself	Nominated	
Country Music Association Awards	2026	Single of the Year	"Somewhere Over Laredo"	Nominated	
GMA Dove Awards	2026	Country/Roots Recorded Song of the Year	"The Jesus I Know Now"	Won	
Grammy Awards	2024	Best Country Duo/Group Performance	"Save Me" (with Jelly Roll)	Nominated	
Grammy Awards	2024	Best Country Album	Bell Bottom Country	Won	
Grammy Awards	2025	Best Country Album	Whirlwind	Nominated	
Grammy Awards	2026	Best Country Solo Performance	"Somewhere Over Laredo"	Nominated	
Grammy Awards	2026	Best Country Song	"Somewhere Over Laredo"	Nominated	
Grammy Awards	2026	Best Country Duo/Group Performance	"Trailblazer" (with Reba McEntire and Miranda Lambert)	Nominated	
Grammy Awards	2027	Best Country Solo Performance	"Can't Sit Still"	Pending	
Grammy Awards	2027	Best Country Duo/Group Performance	"Light of a Clear Blue Morning" (with Dolly Parton, Miley Cyrus, Queen Latifah and Reba McEntire)	Pending	
Grammy Awards	2027	Best Country Duo/Group Performance	"Phones, Keys, Wallet" (with John Mayer)	Pending	
Grammy Awards	2027	Best Country Song	"Phones, Keys, Wallet" (with John Mayer)	Pending	
Grammy Awards	2027	Best Contemporary Christian Music Performance/Song	"The Jesus I Know Now" (with Brandon Lake, Luke Laird and Emily Weisband)	Pending	
Guild of Music Supervisors Awards	2024	Best Song Written and/or Recording Created for a Film	"Out of Oklahoma" (from Twisters)	Nominated	
Hollywood Music in Media Awards	2024	Best Original Song in a Feature Film	"Out of Oklahoma" (from Twisters)	Nominated	
Hollywood Music in Media Awards	2024	Best Music Video	"Out of Oklahoma" (from Twisters)	Won	
iHeartRadio Music Awards	2022	Best New Country Artist	Herself	Won	
iHeartRadio Music Awards	2024	Country Artist of the Year	Herself	Nominated	
iHeartRadio Music Awards	2024	Country Song of the Year	"Heart Like a Truck"	Won	
iHeartRadio Music Awards	2025	Country Artist of the Year	Herself	Nominated	
iHeartRadio Music Awards	2025	Favorite On Screen	Lainey Wilson: Bell Bottom Country	Nominated	
iHeartRadio Music Awards	2026	Country Artist of the Year	Herself	Nominated	
iHeartRadio Music Awards	2026	Favorite Tour Tradition	Cowgirl of the Night Tour	Nominated	
People's Choice Awards	2024	Female Artist of the Year	Herself	Nominated	
People's Choice Awards	2024	Female Country Artist of the Year	Herself	Won	
People's Choice Country Awards	2024	People's Artist of the Year	Herself	Nominated	
People's Choice Country Awards	2024	Female Artist of the Year	Herself	Won	
People's Choice Country Awards	2024	Song of the Year	"Wait in the Truck" (with Hardy)	Nominated	
People's Choice Country Awards	2024	Music Video of the Year	"Wait in the Truck" (with Hardy)	Won	
People's Choice Country Awards	2024	Collaboration of the Year	"Wait in the Truck" (with Hardy)	Nominated	
People's Choice Country Awards	2024	Collaboration of the Year	"Save Me" (with Jelly Roll)	Won	
People's Choice Country Awards	2024	Album of the Year	Bell Bottom Country	Nominated	
People's Choice Country Awards	2024	People's Artist of the Year	Herself	Nominated	
People's Choice Country Awards	2024	Female Artist of the Year	Herself	Won	
People's Choice Country Awards	2024	Female Song of the Year	"Hang Tight Honey"	Nominated	
Society of Composers & Lyricists Awards	2025	Outstanding Original Song for a Comedy or Musical Visual Media Production	"Out of Oklahoma" (from Twisters)	Nominated	
