= Anything Goes Tour =

2015 concert tour by Florida Georgia Line

- Tour by Florida Georgia Line
- Promotional poster for the tour
- Associated album: Anything Goes
- Start date: January 15, 2015
- End date: October 17, 2015
- Legs: 1
- No. of shows: 48
- Box office: $27,860,442

Florida Georgia Line concert chronology
- Here's to the Good Times Tour (2013–14); Anything Goes Tour (2015); Dig Your Roots Tour (2016–17)

The Anything Goes Tour was the second headlining concert tour from American country music duo the Florida Georgia Line, in support of their studio album Anything Goes. It began on January 15, 2015, in Toledo, Ohio. Thomas Rhett and Frankie Ballard served as opening act. For Pollstar's Year End Top 200 North American Tours of 2015, it ranked thirty-first and grossed $29.5 million.

== Background ==
On October 8, 2014, the duo appeared on the Today Show to announce the tour. Additional dates were announced in January 2015.

Their February 25, 2015, sold-out show at Madison Square Garden led Brian Kelley to thank fans, "We've waited a long time for this", "I've gotta give you guys props. You guys sold out Madison Square Garden on a Wednesday night."

== Concert synopsis ==
The show began with the duo shooting straight up in the air from apparatuses at each ends of the stage, which had a sci-fi design.

Hubbard and Kelley kicked off the show with "Every Night" and "Smile", two non-singles from their current album, and ended the night with their smash hit "Cruise". "Good Good" and "Smoke", two more non-singles were used for the encore. During the show they went into an acoustic setup for "Dirt". Tyler Hubbard has said he thinks about his father in heaven when they sing that song, so towards the end of it, during the New York City show he called out, "From MSG to Heaven." Opening acts Thomas Rhett and Frankie joined Florida Georgia Line for "Party People". They sang medley of covers which included songs such as Meghan Trainor's "All About That Bass" and Garth Brooks's "Friends in Low Places".

== Opening acts ==
- Thomas Rhett
- Frankie Ballard

== Setlist ==
1. "Every Night"
2. "Smile"
3. "It'z Just What We Do"
4. "Round Here"
5. "Anything Goes"
6. "Get Your Shine On"
7. "Bumpin' the Night"
8. "Sippin' On Fire"
9. "Dayum Baby"
10. "Dirt"
11. "Like You Ain't Even Gone
12. "Stay" (Black Stone Cherry cover)
13. "This Is How We Roll"
14. "Sun Daze"
15. "Party People" (/Thomas Rhett & Frankie Ballard)
16. Covers medley: "All About That Bass"/"Forgot About Dre"/"We Dem Boyz"/"Treasure"/"Friends in Low Places"
  (Meghan Trainor/Dr. Dre & Eminem/Wiz Khalifa/Bruno Mars/Garth Brooks cover)
17. "Cruise"

Encore

18. "Good Good"

19. "Smoke"

== Tour dates ==
Date	City	Country	Venue	Opening acts	Attendance	Gross revenue
North America
January 15, 2015	Toledo	United States	Huntington Center	Thomas Rhett; Frankie Ballard	7,451 / 7,451	$391,594
January 16, 2015	Dayton	United States	Nutter Center	Thomas Rhett; Frankie Ballard	10,201 / 10,201	$510,074
January 17, 2015	Charlottesville	United States	John Paul Jones Arena	Thomas Rhett; Frankie Ballard	11,844 / 11,844	$519,720
January 22, 2015	Biloxi	United States	Mississippi Coast Coliseum	Thomas Rhett; Frankie Ballard	8,425 / 9,089	$411,719
January 23, 2015	Lafayette	United States	Cajundome	Thomas Rhett; Frankie Ballard	9,543 / 9,543	$477,636
January 24, 2015	North Little Rock	United States	Verizon Arena	Thomas Rhett; Frankie Ballard	12,846 / 14,020	$611,823
February 12, 2015	Sioux City	United States	Tyson Events Center	Thomas Rhett; Frankie Ballard	7,308 / 7,308	$372,906
February 13, 2015	Lincoln	United States	Pinnacle Bank Arena	Thomas Rhett; Frankie Ballard	13,326 / 13,326	$675,947
February 14, 2015	Moline	United States	i Wireless Center	Thomas Rhett; Frankie Ballard	10,716 / 10,716	$551,974
February 18, 2015	Manchester	United States	Verizon Wireless Arena	Thomas Rhett; Frankie Ballard	8,719 / 8,719	$444,128
February 19, 2015	Ottawa	Canada	Canadian Tire Centre	Thomas Rhett; Frankie Ballard	11,626 / 11,626	$572,782
February 20, 2015	Kingston	Canada	K-Rock Centre	Thomas Rhett; Frankie Ballard	4,995 / 4,995	$274,685
February 21, 2015	Uncasville	United States	Mohegan Sun Arena	Thomas Rhett; Frankie Ballard	7,159 / 7,159	$381,510
February 25, 2015	New York City	United States	Madison Square Garden	Thomas Rhett; Frankie Ballard	12,955 / 12,955	$908,339
March 21, 2015	Orange Beach	United States	Amphitheater at the Wharf	Thomas Rhett; Frankie Ballard	9,648 / 9,648	$499,302
April 30, 2015	Columbia	United States	Colonial Life Arena	Thomas Rhett; Frankie Ballard	10,771 / 11,889	$486,242
May 1, 2015	Charleston	United States	Charleston Civic Center	Thomas Rhett; Frankie Ballard	8,824 / 8,824	$433,423
May 2, 2015	Hershey	United States	Giant Center	Thomas Rhett; Frankie Ballard	9,551 / 9,551	$487,473
May 3, 2015	Wilkes-Barre	United States	Mohegan Sun Arena at Casey Plaza	Thomas Rhett; Frankie Ballard	7,379 / 7,379	$373,735
May 7, 2015	Providence	United States	Dunkin' Donuts Center	Thomas Rhett; Frankie Ballard	9,819 / 9,819	$497,453
May 8, 2015	Atlantic City	United States	Boardwalk Hall	Thomas Rhett; Frankie Ballard	12,147 / 12,147	$608,505
May 9, 2015	Columbia	United States	Merriweather Post Pavilion	Thomas Rhett; Frankie Ballard	17,426 / 17,426	$909,470
May 28, 2015	West Palm Beach	United States	Perfect Vodka Amphitheatre	Thomas Rhett; Frankie Ballard	14,300 / 19,440	$459,487
May 29, 2015	Tampa	United States	MidFlorida Credit Union Amphitheatre	Thomas Rhett; Frankie Ballard	18,135 / 19,239	$693,231
May 30, 2015	Pelham	United States	Oak Mountain Amphitheatre	Thomas Rhett; Frankie Ballard	9,972 / 9,972	$428,667
June 24, 2015 ^{[A]}	Milwaukee	United States	Marcus Amphitheatre	Thomas Rhett; Frankie Ballard	20,558 / 22,522	$841,120
June 27, 2015	North Platte	United States	Wild West Arena	Colt Ford	11,246 / 11,246	$688,395
July 24, 2015	Camden	United States	Susquehanna Bank Center	Thomas Rhett; Frankie Ballard	24,967 / 24,967	$885,651
July 25, 2015	Bristow	United States	Jiffy Lube Live	Thomas Rhett; Frankie Ballard	20,301 / 22,543	$712,340
July 26, 2015	Virginia Beach	United States	Farm Bureau Live	Thomas Rhett; Frankie Ballard	18,024 / 20,049	$563,530
August 7, 2015	Bethel	United States	Bethel Woods Center for the Arts	Thomas Rhett; Frankie Ballard	15,647 / 15,647	$592,917
August 8, 2015	Darien	United States	Darien Lake Performing Arts Center	Thomas Rhett; Frankie Ballard	21,216 / 21,216	$812,688
August 13, 2015	Raleigh	United States	Walnut Creek Amphitheatre	Thomas Rhett; Frankie Ballard	18,787 / 19,980	$600,029
August 14, 2015	Charlotte	United States	PNC Music Pavilion	Thomas Rhett; Frankie Ballard	18,105 / 18,801	$614,568
August 15, 2015	Burgettstown	United States	First Niagara Pavilion	Thomas Rhett; Frankie Ballard	21,558 / 22,943	$665,621
August 20, 2015	Beaumont	United States	Ford Park	Thomas Rhett; Frankie Ballard	—	—
August 21, 2015	Austin	United States	Austin360 Amphitheatre	Thomas Rhett; Frankie Ballard	—	—
August 22, 2015	Dallas	United States	Gexa Energy Pavilion	Thomas Rhett; Frankie Ballard	15,011 / 20,011	$457,731
August 27, 2015	Bakersfield	United States	Rabobank Arena	Thomas Rhett; Frankie Ballard	6,615 / 8,523	$328,181
August 28, 2015	Wheatland	United States	Toyota Amphitheatre	Thomas Rhett; Frankie Ballard	15,405 / 18,500	$457,744
September 10, 2015	Holmdel	United States	PNC Bank Arts Center	Thomas Rhett; Frankie Ballard	16,542 / 16,542	$693,691
September 11, 2015	Hartford	United States	Xfinity Theatre	Thomas Rhett; Frankie Ballard	24,031 / 24,031	$778,225
September 12, 2015	Mansfield	United States	Xfinity Center	Thomas Rhett; Frankie Ballard	19,923 /19,923	$702,924
September 24, 2015	Wichita	United States	Intrust Bank Arena	Thomas Rhett; Frankie Ballard	7,844 / 10,613	$329,409
September 25, 2015	Tulsa	United States	BOK Center	Thomas Rhett; Frankie Ballard	9,716 / 11,624	$431,134
September 26, 2015	Maryland Heights	United States	Hollywood Casino Amphitheatre	Thomas Rhett; Frankie Ballard	19,283 / 19,283	$643,376
October 3, 2015	Chula Vista	United States	Sleep Train Amphitheatre	Thomas Rhett; Frankie Ballard	18,285 / 19,603	$653,955
October 9, 2015	Albuquerque	United States	Isleta Amphitheater	Thomas Rhett; Frankie Ballard	13,592 / 15,267	$425,825
October 10, 2015	Phoenix	United States	Ak-Chin Pavilion	Thomas Rhett; Frankie Ballard	16,144 / 20,261	$525,060
October 15, 2015	Southaven	United States	BancorpSouth Arena	Thomas Rhett; Frankie Ballard	10,129 / 12,385	$323,799
October 16, 2015	New Orleans	United States	Smoothie King Center	Thomas Rhett; Frankie Ballard	11,590 / 12,617	$524,921
October 17, 2015	Atlanta	United States	Aaron's Amphitheatre	Thomas Rhett; Frankie Ballard	18,717 / 18,717	$625,783
Total					678,322 / 722,100	$27,860,442

Festivals
^{A} This concert is a part of Summerfest.

== Critical reception ==
Jim Allen of CMT.com said about their sold-out show at Madison Square Garden, "Instead of hitting the crowd over the head with the hits from the start, they kicked off with a pair of nonsingles from their 2014 No. 1 album, Anything Goes — "Every Night" and "Smile". By the second song, Kelley had stripped down to a muscle shirt, giving a spotlight to both his gym-rat physique and his tattoos. This move garnered no audible dissent from the strikingly high percentage of giddy young girls in the audience."
