= Smooth Tour =

2017 concert tour by Florida Georgia Line

- Tour by Florida Georgia Line
- Associated album: Dig Your Roots
- Start date: June 3, 2017
- End date: October 21, 2017
- Legs: 1
- No. of shows: 47

Florida Georgia Line concert chronology
- Dig Your Roots Tour (2016–17); Smooth Tour (2017); Can't Say I Ain't Country Tour (2019)

The Smooth Tour was the fourth headlining concert tour by the American country music duo Florida Georgia Line. The tour of the United States was in support of their third studio album, Dig Your Roots (2016). It began on June 3, 2017, in Austin, Texas, and concluded on October 21, 2017, in Alpharetta, Georgia.

== Background ==
In February 2017, Florida Georgia Line announced the tour.

== Opening acts ==
- Backstreet Boys (Boston, Minneapolis & Chicago)
- Russell Dickerson (selected dates)
- Ryan Hurd (selected dates)
- Chris Lane
- Nelly
- Morgan Wallen (selected dates)

== Setlists ==
Smooth Tour Setlist

Florida Georgia Line

1. "Anything Goes"
2. "Smile"
3. "Round Here"
4. "Confession"
5. "Dig Your Roots"
6. "May We All"
7. "Dirt"
8. "Sippin' on Fire"
9. "H.O.L.Y."
10. "God, Your Mama, and Me"
11. "Sun Daze" (With Chris Lane)
12. "Get Your Shine On"
13. "This Is How We Roll"

Encore

15. "Hot in Herre (Nelly cover) (With Nelly)
16. "Cruise (Remix)" (With Nelly)

Nelly

1. "Party People"
2. "E.I"
3. "Where the Party At" (Jagged Edge cover)
4. "Where the Party At"
5. "Batter Up"
6. "Air Force Ones"
7. "Country Grammar (Hot Shit)"
8. "Ride Wit Me"
9. "The Fix"
10. "Die a Happy Man" (Thomas Rhett cover
11. "Sounds Good to Me"
12. "Get Like Me"
13. "Grillz"
14. "Move that Body"
15. "All I Do Is Win/Fake Love/That's What I Like"
16. "Body On Me"
17. "Over and Over"
18. "Dilemma"
19. "Just a Dream"

Chris Lane

1. "Who's It Gonna Be"
2. "Her Own Kind of Beautiful"
3. "Let Me Love You"
4. "For Her"
5. "I Want It That Way/Can't Feel My Face/SexyBack/Want to Want Me/Bye Bye Bye/Whip (Nae Nae)/It's Going Down for Real"
6. "Fix"
Boston, Minneapolis & Chicago Setlists

Florida Georgia Line

1. "Anything Goes"
2. "Smile"
3. "Round Here"
4. "Confession"
5. "Dig Your Roots"
6. "May We All"
7. "Dirt"
8. "Sippin' on Fire"
9. "H.O.L.Y."
10. "God, Your Mama, and Me" (With Backstreet Boys)
11. "Sun Daze" (With Chris Lane)
12. "Get Your Shine On"
13. "This Is How We Roll"

Encore

15. "Hot in Herre (Nelly cover) (With Nelly)
16. "Everybody (Backstreet's Back)" (Backstreet Boys cover) (With Backstreet Boys)
17. "Cruise (Remix)" (With Backstreet Boys & Nelly)

Backstreet Boys

1. "Larger Than Life"
2. "The One"
3. "Get Down (You're the One for Me)"
4. "Drowning
5. "Quit Playing Games (With My Heart)"
6. "As Long as You Love Me
7. "The Call"
8. "We've Got It Goin' On"
9. "I Want It That Way

Nelly

1. "Party People"
2. "E.I"
3. "Where the Party At" (Jagged Edge cover)
4. "Where the Party At"
5. "Batter Up"
6. "Air Force Ones"
7. "Country Grammar (Hot Shit)"
8. "Ride Wit Me"
9. "The Fix"
10. "Die a Happy Man" (Thomas Rhett cover
11. "Sounds Good to Me"
12. "Get Like Me"
13. "Grillz"
14. "Move that Body"
15. "All I Do Is Win/Fake Love/That's What I Like"
16. "Body On Me"
17. "Over and Over"
18. "Dilemma"
19. "Just a Dream"

Chris Lane

1. "Who's It Gonna Be"
2. "Her Own Kind of Beautiful"
3. "Let Me Love You"
4. "For Her"
5. "Can't Feel My Face/SexyBack/Want to Want Me/Bye Bye Bye/Whip (Nae Nae)/It's Going Down for Real"
6. "Fix"

== Shows ==
| Date | City | Venue | Opening acts | Attendance | Revenue |
|---|---|---|---|---|---|
| June 2, 2017 | Austin | Austin360 Amphitheater | Nelly; Chris Lane; Morgan Wallen | 9,955 / 10,998 | $599,547 |
| June 3, 2017 | Dallas | Starplex Pavilion | Nelly; Chris Lane; Morgan Wallen | 14,886 / 18,872 | $563,266 |
| June 15, 2017 | Wantagh | Northwell Health at Jones Beach Theater | Nelly; Chris Lane; Ryan Hurd | 13,586 / 13,586 | $771,463 |
| June 16, 2017 | Darien Center | Darien Lake Performing Arts Center | Nelly; Chris Lane; Ryan Hurd | 21,662 / 21,662 | $842,168 |
| June 17, 2017 | Camden | BB&T Pavilion | Nelly; Chris Lane; Ryan Hurd | 24,785 / 24,785 | $891,556 |
| June 24, 2017 | Noblesville | Klipsch Music Center | Nelly; Chris Lane; Ryan Hurd | 25,185 / 25,185 | $1,065,584 |
| June 25, 2017 | Maryland Heights | Hollywood Casino Amphitheatre | Nelly; Chris Lane; Ryan Hurd | 18,660 / 18,660 | $835,519 |
| July 7, 2017 | Boston | Fenway Park | Backstreet Boys; Nelly; Chris Lane | 35,699 / 35,699 | $3,072,146 |
| July 14, 2017 | Orange Beach | Amphitheater at The Wharf | Nelly; Chris Lane; Morgan Wallen | 18,182 / 18,182 | $938,852 |
| July 15, 2017 | Orange Beach | Amphitheater at The Wharf | Nelly; Chris Lane; Morgan Wallen | 18,182 / 18,182 | $938,852 |
| July 21, 2017 | Raleigh | Coastal Credit Union Music Park | Nelly; Chris Lane; Morgan Wallen | 18,778 / 18,843 | $782,131 |
| July 22, 2017 | Hershey | Hersheypark Stadium | Nelly; Chris Lane; Morgan Wallen | 22,853 / 25,222 | $1,005,288 |
| July 23, 2017 | Saratoga Springs | Saratoga Performing Arts Center | Nelly; Chris Lane; Morgan Wallen | 22,793 / 24,331 | $895,020 |
| July 27, 2017 | Tulsa | BOK Center | Nelly; Chris Lane; Ryan Hurd | 8,139 / 9,165 | $523,408 |
| July 29, 2017 | Minneapolis | Target Field | Backstreet Boys; Nelly; Chris Lane | 37,592 / 37,592 | $3,109,656 |
| August 3, 2017 | Charlotte | PNC Music Pavilion | Nelly; Chris Lane; Ryan Hurd | 17,879 / 17,978 | $692,588 |
| August 4, 2017 | Virginia Beach | Veterans United Home Loans Amphitheater | Nelly; Chris Lane; Ryan Hurd | 19,817 / 19,817 | $742,558 |
| August 5, 2017 | Bristow | Jiffy Lube Live | Nelly; Chris Lane; Ryan Hurd | 23,055 / 23,055 | $994,285 |
| August 10, 2017 | Bethel | Bethel Woods Center for the Arts | Nelly; Chris Lane; Ryan Hurd | 16,039 / 16,782 | $630,495 |
| August 11, 2017 | Cuyahoga Falls | Blossom Music Center | Nelly; Chris Lane; Ryan Hurd | 20,830 / 20,917 | $918,126 |
| August 12, 2017 | Chicago | Wrigley Field | Backstreet Boys; Nelly; Chris Lane | 42,387 / 42,387 | $3,387,468 |
| August 17, 2017 | Holmdel | PNC Bank Arts Center | Nelly; Chris Lane; Ryan Hurd | 16,948 / 16,948 | $820,704 |
| August 18, 2017 | Hartford | Xfinity Theatre | Nelly; Chris Lane; Ryan Hurd | 24,387 / 24,387 | $1,002,413 |
| August 19, 2017 | Burgettstown | First Niagara Pavilion | Nelly; Chris Lane; Ryan Hurd | 22,825 / 22,825 | $1,069,238 |
| September 1, 2017 | Gilford | Bank of New Hampshire Pavilion | Nelly; Chris Lane; Morgan Wallen | 13,967 / 15,336 | $825,571 |
| September 2, 2017 | Gilford | Bank of New Hampshire Pavilion | Nelly; Chris Lane; Morgan Wallen | 13,967 / 15,336 | $825,571 |
| September 7, 2017 | Anaheim | Honda Center | Nelly; Chris Lane; Russell Dickerson | 11,509 / 11,509 | $738,815 |
| September 8, 2017 | San Bernardino | Glen Halen Amphitheater | Nelly; Chris Lane; Russell Dickerson | 22,528 / 24,201 | $910,043 |
| September 9, 2017 | Chula Vista | Mattress Firm Amphitheatre | Nelly; Chris Lane; Russell Dickerson | 18,638 / 18,638 | $720,499 |
| September 10, 2017 | Phoenix | Ak-Chin Pavilion | Nelly; Chris Lane; Russell Dickerson | 14,481 / 17,814 | $688,325 |
| September 14, 2017 | Wheatland | Toyota Amphitheatre | Nelly; Chris Lane; Russell Dickerson | — | — |
| September 15, 2017 | Concord | Concord Pavilion | Nelly; Chris Lane; Russell Dickerson | 8,663 / 12,500 | $357,625 |
| September 16, 2017 | Mountain View | Shoreline Amphitheatre | Nelly; Chris Lane; Russell Dickerson | — | — |
| September 21, 2017 | Kennewick | Toyota Center | Nelly; Chris Lane; Russell Dickerson | — | — |
| September 22, 2017 | Missoula | Adams Center | Nelly; Chris Lane; Russell Dickerson | — | — |
| September 23, 2017 | Bozeman | Brick Breeden Fieldhouse | Nelly; Chris Lane; Russell Dickerson | — | — |
| September 29, 2017 | West Valley City | USANA Amphitheatre | Nelly; Chris Lane; Russell Dickerson | — | — |
| September 30, 2017 | Denver | Pepsi Center | Nelly; Chris Lane; Russell Dickerson | — | — |
| October 1, 2017 | Albuquerque | Isleta Amphitheater | Nelly; Chris Lane; Russell Dickerson | — | — |
| October 6, 2017 | Auburn | White River Amphitheatre | Nelly; Chris Lane; Russell Dickerson | — | — |
| October 7, 2017 | Ridgefield | Sunlight Supply Amphitheater | Nelly; Chris Lane; Russell Dickerson | — | — |
| October 12, 2017 | Jacksonville | Jacksonville Veterans Memorial Arena | Nelly; Chris Lane; Morgan Wallen | — | — |
| October 13, 2017 | Tampa | MidFlorida Credit Union Amphitheatre | Nelly; Chris Lane; Morgan Wallen | — | — |
| October 14, 2017 | West Palm Beach | Perfect Vodka Amphitheatre | Nelly; Chris Lane; Morgan Wallen | — | — |
| October 19, 2017 | Birmingham | Oak Mountain Amphitheater | Nelly; Chris Lane; Morgan Wallen | — | — |
| October 20, 2017 | Alpharetta | Verizon Wireless Amphitheatre | Nelly; Chris Lane; Morgan Wallen | — | — |
| October 21, 2017 | Alpharetta | Verizon Wireless Amphitheatre | Nelly; Chris Lane; Morgan Wallen | — | — |
| Total | | | | 567,068 / 607,876 | $28,594,357 |
