= Tyler Hubbard =

American singer-songwriter (born 1987)

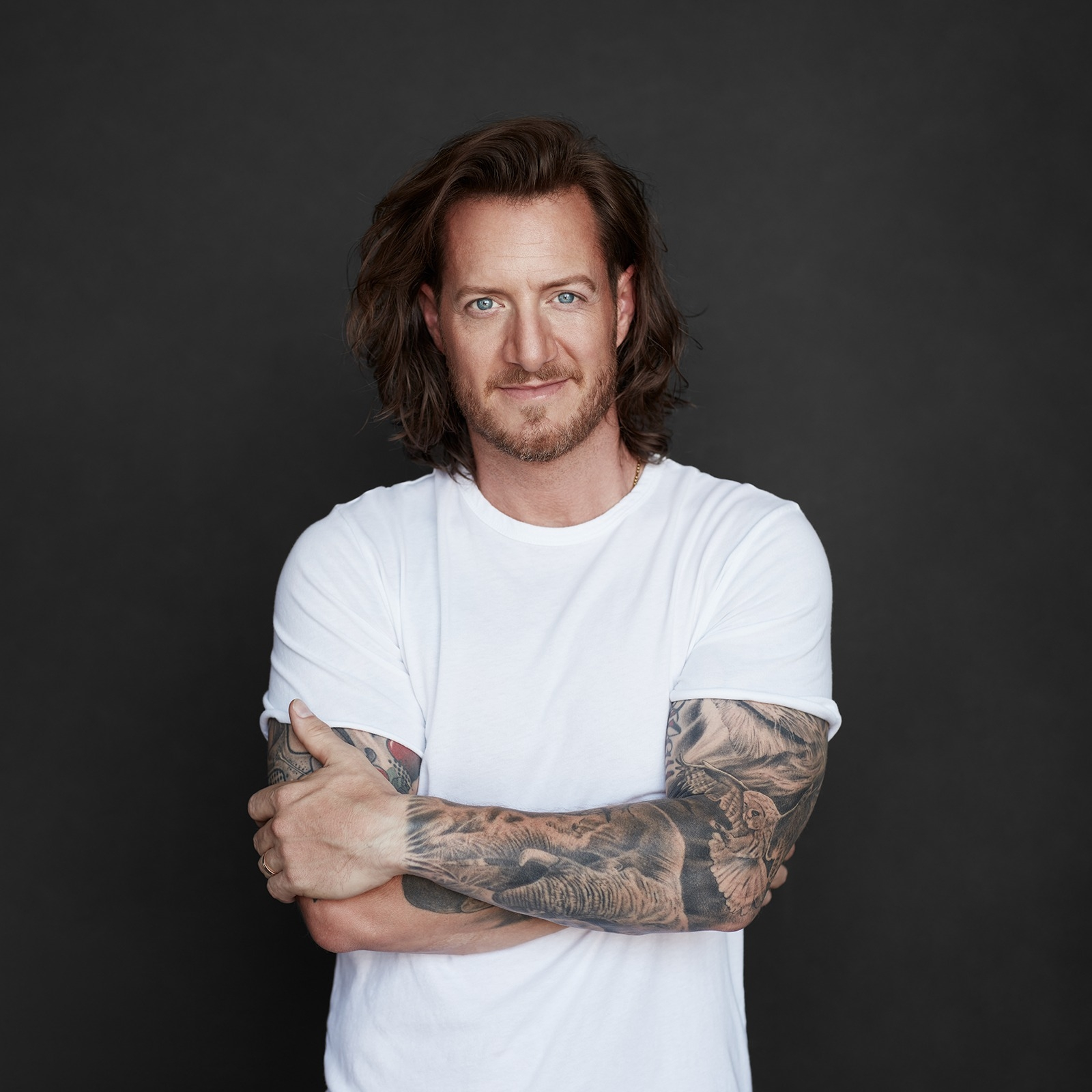
- Hubbard in 2023

Background information
- Born: Tyler Reed Hubbard; January 31, 1987 (age 39)
- Origin: Monroe, Georgia, U.S.
- Genres: Country; country pop; country rock
- Instruments: Vocals; guitar; piano
- Years active: 2010–present
- Labels: Hubbard House; EMI Nashville
- Member of: Florida Georgia Line
- Spouse: Hayley Stommel (m. 2015)
- Website: tylerhubbardofficial.com

Tyler Reed Hubbard (born January 31, 1987) is an American singer-songwriter, and musician, best known as a member of the country music duo Florida Georgia Line. After that duo went on hiatus in 2021, Hubbard began recording as a solo artist on EMI Nashville. His first solo chart entry was a guest vocalist on Tim McGraw's "Undivided", followed by his first solo single "5 Foot 9", which topped the Billboard Country Airplay charts in 2022. He released his self-titled debut album in 2023.

== Early life ==
Hubbard was born on January 31, 1987, in Monroe, Georgia. He spent much of his time on dirt bikes or playing whatever sport was in season. He was very involved at church and would attend multiple times a week. By the time he was in high school, he was leading the worship service at church and spending his free time making hip-hop/rap beats with his friends and learning to play the guitar. Hubbard graduated from high school at Loganville Christian Academy in 2005 and went on to study at Belmont University.

== Career ==
=== Florida Georgia Line (2010–2022) ===
Hubbard was introduced to Brian Kelley at Belmont University in 2007 by a mutual friend in a campus worship group. The two became great friends, and began writing songs and playing guitar together. The two began playing writers rounds throughout Nashville, as well as selling out shows at local venues. In 2009, the duo decided they wanted to pursue music as a career and they started playing shows throughout the south. In 2010, they recorded and digitally distributed their first EP, Anything Like Me. Shortly afterwards, they were discovered at a county fair by Nickelback's producer, Joey Moi. After writing and polishing songs for two years, the duo released their second EP It'z Just What We Do in 2012. Major labels became interested when their debut single, "Cruise", first hit satellite radio on "The Highway" channel and began selling well on iTunes, leading to a deal with Republic Nashville and the Big Machine Label Group.

The duo released their first studio album, Here's to the Good Times, on December 4, 2012, with Republic Nashville. The album was the sixth best selling album of 2013. "Cruise", the first single on the album, reached number 1 on the Country Airplay chart dated December 15, 2012. A remix of "Cruise" featuring Nelly later hit number 4 on the Billboard Hot 100. The song is also the best selling country digital song of all time, with sales of over 10 million, and it spent 24 weeks at number 1 on Hot Country songs. The other singles from this album include "Get Your Shine On", "Round Here", "Stay", and "This Is How We Roll".

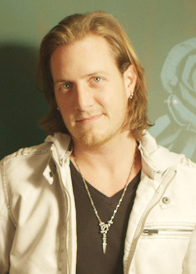
Hubbard in 2013

Florida Georgia Line's second studio album, Anything Goes, was released on October 14, 2014. The album's first single, "Dirt", was released on July 8, 2014. Other singles from this album include "Sun Daze", "Sippin' On Fire", "Anything Goes" and "Confession".

The duo's third album, Dig Your Roots, was released on August 26, 2016. Singles include "H.O.L.Y.", "May We All", "God, Your Mama, and Me" and "Smooth".

They released their fourth studio album, Can't Say I Ain't Country, on February 15, 2019. Singles include "Simple", "Talk You Out of It" and "Blessings".

On February 12, 2021, they released their fifth studio album, Life Rolls On, which was co-produced by the duo alongside Corey Crowder. It includes the singles "I Love My Country" and "Long Live".

=== Tree Vibez Music and Round Here Records (2015–present) ===
In 2015, Hubbard and Kelley started their own artist development and music publishing company called Tree Vibez Music. Since the company began, they have signed writer Jordan Schmidt, writer Jimmie Deeghan, writer/artist Drew Castle as well as singer-songwriters Canaan Smith and RaeLynn. In 2019, Hubbard and Kelley launched Round Here Records; an independent label with Smith signed as the flagship artist.

=== Solo career (2021–present) ===
Hubbard featured on the single "Undivided" with Tim McGraw, released on January 13, 2021. He then featured on the song "My Way" with rapper Lathan Warlick. Hubbard and Russell Dickerson were both featured on Thomas Rhett's 2022 promotional single "Death Row".

Hubbard signed a recording contract with EMI Nashville in May 2022 and plans to release a solo album on the label. He released his debut solo single "5 Foot 9" later that month. On November 4, 2022, Hubbard announced that his debut album would be released on January 27, 2023. He co-headlined the halftime show at the 109th Grey Cup in Regina, Saskatchewan alongside Jordan Davis and Josh Ross.

On February 16, 2024, Hubbard released the single "Wish You Would" and announced that his second album Strong will be released on April 12. Also in 2024 he opened for Kane Brown's In The Air Tour.

In the fall of 2026, Hubbard joined Dan + Shay's "The Young Tour" as an opening act with Josh Ross.

== Personal life ==
In February 2014, Hubbard sustained a back injury in a dirt bike accident. Hubbard suffered another dirt bike accident in August 2020, rupturing his Achilles tendon and breaking an ankle bone.

Hubbard and Hayley Stommel began dating in 2013. On September 22, 2014, Hubbard proposed during a helicopter flight. They were married in Sun Valley, Idaho on July 1, 2015. The couple have two sons and one daughter. During their marriage, Hubbard has written several songs inspired by Stommel, including "5 Foot 9", "Meant to Be", and the Jason Aldean song "You Make It Easy".

== Discography ==
=== Studio albums ===
| Title | Details | Peak chart positions | | | Certifications |
| Title | Details | US | US Country | CAN | Certifications |
|---|---|---|---|---|---|
| Tyler Hubbard | Released: January 27, 2023; Label: Hubbard House / EMI Records Nashville; Format: CD, digital download, LP, streaming | 40 | 8 | 90 | RIAA: Gold |
| Strong | Released: April 12, 2024; Label: Hubbard House / EMI Records Nashville; Format: CD, digital download, LP, streaming | 187 | 35 | — | |

=== Extended plays ===
| Title | Details | Peak chart positions | |
| Title | Details | US | US Country |
|---|---|---|---|
| Dancin' in the Country | Released: August 19, 2022; Label: Hubbard House / EMI Records Nashville; Format: Digital download, streaming | 107 | 12 |

=== Singles ===
| Year | Title | Peak positions | | | | | | Certifications | Album |
| Year | Title | US | US Country | US Country Airplay | CAN | CAN Country | WW | Certifications | Album |
|---|---|---|---|---|---|---|---|---|---|
| 2021 | "Undivided" (with Tim McGraw) | 76 | 23 | 16 | 66 | 4 | — | MC: Gold | Here on Earth |
| 2022 | "5 Foot 9" | 22 | 5 | 1 | 28 | 1 | 140 | RIAA: 3× Platinum; ARIA: Gold; MC: 3× Platinum; RMNZ: Gold | Tyler Hubbard |
| 2022 | "Dancin' in the Country" | 23 | 6 | 2 | 31 | 1 | — | RIAA: 3× Platinum; MC: 2× Platinum; RMNZ: Gold | Tyler Hubbard |
| 2023 | "Back Then Right Now" | 62 | 9 | 1 | 94 | 2 | — | RIAA: Gold; MC: Gold | Strong |
| 2024 | "Park" | 84 | 24 | 1 | 89 | 1 | — | | Strong |
| 2025 | "After Midnight" (with Nate Smith) | — | — | 24 | — | 34 | — | | Non-album single |
| 2026 | "Land" | — | — | 32 | — | 57 | — | | TBA |
| 2026 | "902180" | — | — | — | — | 42 | — | | TBA |
| 2026 | "All I Need Is You" | — | — | — | — | — | — | | The Chosen – Inspired By (Seasons 1-5) |

==== Promotional singles ====
| Year | Title | Album |
|---|---|---|
| 2021 | "My Way" (with Lathan Warlick) | My Way |
| 2022 | "Death Row" (Thomas Rhett featuring Tyler Hubbard and Russell Dickerson) | Where We Started |
| 2022 | "35's" | Tyler Hubbard |
| 2022 | "Way Home" | Tyler Hubbard |
| 2023 | "A Lot With a Little" | Strong |
| 2024 | "Turn" | Strong |
| 2024 | "Wish You Would" | Strong |
| 2024 | "Heroes" | Non-album singles |
| 2025 | "Forget Tonight" (with Steve Aoki) | Non-album singles |
| 2025 | "Whiskey Rain" (Graham Barham featuring Tyler Hubbard) | Club Country |

=== Other charted songs ===
| Year | Song | Peak positions | Album |
| Year | Song | US Christ. | Album |
|---|---|---|---|
| 2021 | "Good to Be Loved by You" (with Chris Tomlin) | 34 | Chris Tomlin & Friends: Summer |

=== Guest appearances ===
List of non-single guest appearances, with other performing artists, showing year released and album name
| Title | Year | Other artist(s) | Album |
|---|---|---|---|
| "Rubber Meets the Road" | 2021 | Brantley Gilbert | The Ice Road |
| "Good to Be Loved By You" | 2021 | Chris Tomlin | Chris Tomlin & Friends: Summer |
| "Country Boy Do" | 2021 | Nelly | Heartland |
