= Dig Your Roots Tour =

2016–17 concert tour by Florida Georgia Line

- Tour by Florida Georgia Line
- Associated album: Dig Your Roots
- Start date: May 12, 2016
- End date: May 6, 2017
- Legs: 2
- No. of shows: 102
- Box office: $41,535,529

Florida Georgia Line concert chronology
- Anything Goes Tour (2015); Dig Your Roots Tour (2016–17); Smooth Tour (2017)

The Dig Your Roots Tour was the third headlining concert tour by American country music duo Florida Georgia Line. The tour is in support of their third studio album Dig Your Roots (2016), it began on May 12, 2016, in Tupelo, Mississippi and finished on May 6, 2017, in Quebec City, Quebec.

== Background ==
In January 2016, Florida Georgia Line announced the tour.

== Opening acts ==
- Cole Swindell
- The Cadillac Three
- Kane Brown
- LANco
- Chris Lane
- Granger Smith/Earl Dibbles Jr.
- Dustin Lynch
- Ryan Follese
- Morgan Wallen

== Setlists ==
Setlist until June 17, 2016

1. "Party People" (Start From B-Stage)
2. "It'z Just What We Do"
3. "Round Here"
4. "Anything Goes"
5. "Smooth"
6. "Confession"
7. "Stay" (Black Stone Cherry cover)
8. "May We All"
9. "Dig Your Roots"

B-Stage

10. "H.O.L.Y."
11. "Songwriters Session" (With Cole Swindell & Jaren Johnson)
12. "Three Little Birds" (Bob Marley and the Wailers cover)
13. "Life is a Honeymoon"

Back To Main Stage

14. "Sun Daze" (With Kane Brown)
15. "Get Your Shine On"

Encore

16. "This Is How We Roll"
17. Cover medley: "Ridin' Dirty"/"Should've Been a Cowboy"/"Last Resort"/"Everybody (Backstreet's Back)"/"Jump Around"
18. "Cruise"
Setlist from June 17 to October 1, 2016

1. "This Is How We Roll"
2. "It'z Just What We Do"
3. "Round Here"
4. "Anything Goes"
5. "Smooth"
6. "Confession"
7. "Stay" (Black Stone Cherry cover)
8. "May We All"
9. "Dig Your Roots"
10. "H.O.L.Y."
11. "Songwriters Session" (With Cole Swindell & Jaren Johnson)
12. "Three Little Birds" (Bob Marley and the Wailers cover)
13. "Life is a Honeymoon"
14. "Sun Daze" (With Kane Brown)
15. "Get Your Shine On"

Encore

15. "Party People"
16. Cover medley: "Ridin' Dirty"/"Should've Been a Cowboy"/"Last Resort"/"Everybody (Backstreet's Back)"/"Jump Around"
17. "Cruise"
Setlist from October 1, 2016 to May 6, 2017

1. "This Is How We Roll"
2. "It'z Just What We Do"
3. "Round Here"
4. "Anything Goes"
5. "Dig Your Roots"
6. "Confession"
7. "Smooth"
8. "May We All"
9. "God, Your Mama, and Me"

B-Stage

10. "Dirt"
11. "Dayum, Baby/Hell Raisin' Heat Of The Summer/Here's To The Good Times"
12. "H.O.L.Y."

Back To Main Stage

13. "Sun Daze" (With Kane Brown or Chris Lane)
14. "Get Your Shine On"

Encore

15. "Party People"
16. Cover medley: "Ridin' Dirty"/"Should've Been a Cowboy"/"Last Resort"/"Everybody (Backstreet's Back)"/"Jump Around"
17. "Cruise"

Notes:

- In Nashville The Backstreet Boys joined FGL on-stage to sing "Everybody (Backstreet's Back)" & To Live Debut "God Your Mama & Me".

== Tour dates ==
Dates	City	Country	Venue	Opening acts	Attendance	Revenue
Leg 1: North America
May 12, 2016	Tupelo	United States	BancorpSouth Arena	Cole Swindell; The Cadillac Three; Kane Brown; Chris Lane	7,476 / 7,476	$408,103
May 13, 2016	Orange Beach	United States	Amphitheater at the Wharf	Cole Swindell; The Cadillac Three; Kane Brown; Chris Lane	9,687 / 9,687	$576,131
May 14, 2016	Livingston	United States	Baptist Health Systems Amphitheatre	Cole Swindell; The Cadillac Three; Kane Brown; Chris Lane	8,228 / 8,361	$442,018
May 19, 2016	Rapid City	United States	Rushmore Plaza Civic Center	Cole Swindell; The Cadillac Three; Kane Brown; Chris Lane	5,710 / 6,299	$307,323
May 20, 2016	Bismarck	United States	Bismarck Civic Center	Cole Swindell; The Cadillac Three; Kane Brown; Chris Lane	6,030 / 6,330	$311,628
May 21, 2016	Grand Forks	United States	Ralph Engelstad Arena	Cole Swindell; The Cadillac Three; Kane Brown; Chris Lane	8,273 / 8,273	$451,517
May 22, 2016	Sioux Falls	United States	Denny Sanford Premier Center	Cole Swindell; The Cadillac Three; Kane Brown; Chris Lane	10,548 / 10,548	$576,131
June 11, 2016 (Note: This show is a part of the CMA Music Festival.)	Nashville	United States	Nissan Stadium	—	—	—
June 12, 2016 (Note: This show was a part of the Carolina Country Music Festival.)	Myrtle Beach	United States	Carolina Country Music Festival	—	—	—
June 16, 2016	Mount Pleasant	United States	Soaring Eagle Casino & Resort	Cole Swindell; The Cadillac Three; Kane Brown; Chris Lane	10,982 / 10,982	$754,065
June 17, 2016	Clarkston	United States	DTE Energy Music Theatre	Cole Swindell; The Cadillac Three; Kane Brown; Chris Lane	15,117 / 15,117	$577,191
June 18, 2016	Noblesville	United States	Klipsch Music Center	Cole Swindell; The Cadillac Three; Kane Brown; Chris Lane	24,790 / 24,790	$798,062
June 19, 2016 (Note: This show was a part of the Buckeye Country Superfest.)	Columbus	United States	Ohio Stadium	—	—	—
June 23, 2016	Bangor	United States	Darling's Waterfront Pavilion	Cole Swindell; The Cadillac Three; Kane Brown; Chris Lane	13,343 / 13,343	$413,069
June 24, 2016	Gilford	United States	Bank of New Hampshire Pavilion	Cole Swindell; The Cadillac Three; Kane Brown; Chris Lane	16,885 / 16,885	$884,863
June 25, 2016	Gilford	United States	Bank of New Hampshire Pavilion	Cole Swindell; The Cadillac Three; Kane Brown; Chris Lane	16,885 / 16,885	$884,863
July 2, 2016 (Note: This show was a part of the Trackside Music Festival.)	London	Canada	Western Fair District	—	—	—
July 7, 2016	Hartford	United States	Xfinity Theatre	Cole Swindell; The Cadillac Three; Kane Brown; Chris Lane	24,454 / 24,454	$807,153
July 8, 2016 (Note: This show is a part of 2016 DICK’S Sporting Goods Open .)	Endicott	United States	Enjoie Golf Course	Cole Swindell; The Cadillac Three; Kane Brown; Chris Lane	—	—
July 9, 2016	Camden	United States	BB&T Pavilion	Cole Swindell; The Cadillac Three; Kane Brown; Chris Lane	24,294 / 24,294	$831,768
July 14, 2016	Raleigh	United States	Coastal Credit Union Music Park	Cole Swindell; The Cadillac Three; Kane Brown; Chris Lane	19,257 / 19,980	$615,392
July 16, 2016	Bristow	United States	Jiffy Lube Live	Cole Swindell; The Cadillac Three; Kane Brown; Chris Lane	23,055 / 23,055	$914,509
July 17, 2016	Wantagh	United States	Nikon at Jones Beach Theater	Cole Swindell; The Cadillac Three; Kane Brown; Chris Lane	13,697 / 13,697	$760,627
July 21, 2016 (Note: This concert is a part of Country Jam USA.)	Eau Claire	United States	Country Jam USA	—	—	—
July 23, 2016 (Note: This concert is a part of Country Thunder.)	Twin Lakes	United States	Country Thunder	—	—	—
July 28, 2016	Billings	United States	Rimrock Auto Arena at MetraPark	Cole Swindell; The Cadillac Three; Kane Brown; Chris Lane	7,448 / 8,404	$411,606
July 29, 2016	West Valley City	United States	USANA Amphitheatre	Cole Swindell; The Cadillac Three; Kane Brown; Chris Lane	19,975 / 19,975	$803,374
July 30, 2016 (Note: This concert is a part of Cheyenne Frontier Days.)	Cheyenne	United States	Cheyenne Frontier Days	Cole Swindell	—	
August 4, 2016	Holmdel	United States	PNC Bank Arts Center	Cole Swindell; The Cadillac Three; Kane Brown; Chris Lane	16,927 / 16,927	$732,180
August 5, 2016	Mansfield	United States	Xfinity Center	Cole Swindell; The Cadillac Three; Kane Brown; Chris Lane	19,281 / 19,281	$884,176
August 6, 2016	Pointe-du-Chene	Canada	Can-Am Park (Parlee Beach Provincial Park)	Cole Swindell; The Cadillac Three; Kane Brown; Chris Lane	—	
August 12, 2016 (Note: This show is a part of the Willamette Country Music Festival.)	Brownsville	United States	Willamette Country Music Festival	Cole Swindell; The Cadillac Three; LANco; Chris Lane	—	
August 25, 2016	New York City	United States	The Theater at Madison Square Garden	The Cadillac Three; Chris Lane	3,117 / 3,117	$163,643
August 26, 2016	Darien Center	United States	Darien Lake Performing Arts Center	Cole Swindell; The Cadillac Three; Kane Brown; Chris Lane	21,800 / 21,800	$890,992
August 27, 2016	Burgettstown	United States	First Niagara Pavilion	Cole Swindell; The Cadillac Three; Kane Brown; Chris Lane	22,629 / 22,629	$899,806
August 28, 2016	Saratoga Springs	United States	Saratoga Performing Arts Center	Cole Swindell; The Cadillac Three; Kane Brown; Chris Lane	18,458 /24,430	$749,481
September 1, 2016	Toronto	Canada	Molson Canadian Amphitheatre	Cole Swindell; The Cadillac Three; Kane Brown; Chris Lane	16,026 / 16,026	$753,011
September 2, 2016	Syracuse	United States	Lakeview Amphitheater	Cole Swindell; The Cadillac Three; Kane Brown; Chris Lane	16,199 / 17,126	$667,982
September 3, 2016	Atlantic City	United States	Atlantic City Beach	Cole Swindell; The Cadillac Three; Kane Brown; Chris Lane	—	—
September 4, 2016 (Note: This show is a part of Red, White, & Boom.)	Lexington	United States	Whitaker Bank Ballpark	Cole Swindell; The Cadillac Three; Kane Brown; Chris Lane	—	—
September 8, 2016	Erie	United States	Erie Insurance Arena	Cole Swindell; The Cadillac Three; Kane Brown; Chris Lane	7,074 / 7,074	$378,425
September 9, 2016	Cuyahoga Falls	United States	Blossom Music Center	Cole Swindell; The Cadillac Three; Kane Brown; Chris Lane	20,815 / 20,815	$840,835
September 10, 2016	Charlotte	United States	PNC Music Pavilion	Cole Swindell; The Cadillac Three; Kane Brown; Chris Lane	18,731 / 18,731	$794,387
September 11, 2016	Virginia Beach	United States	Veterans United Home Loans Amphitheater	Cole Swindell; The Cadillac Three; Kane Brown; Chris Lane	19,904 / 19,904	$766,136
September 15, 2016	Des Moines	United States	Wells Fargo Arena	Cole Swindell; The Cadillac Three; Kane Brown; Chris Lane	12,562 / 13,321	$682,544
September 16, 2016	Maryland Heights	United States	Hollywood Casino Amphitheatre	Cole Swindell; The Cadillac Three; Kane Brown; Chris Lane	19,927 / 19,927	$814,919
September 17, 2016	Tinley Park	United States	Hollywood Casino Amphitheatre	Cole Swindell; The Cadillac Three; Kane Brown; Chris Lane	28,630 / 28,630	$1,198,900
September 22, 2016	Englewood	United States	Fiddler's Green Amphitheatre	Cole Swindell; The Cadillac Three; Kane Brown; Chris Lane	16,862 / 16,862	$670,148
September 23, 2016	Albuquerque	United States	Isleta Amphitheater	Cole Swindell; The Cadillac Three; Kane Brown; Chris Lane	14,374 / 15,222	$605,901
September 29, 2016	Reno	United States	Reno Events Center	Cole Swindell; The Cadillac Three; Kane Brown; Chris Lane	5,962 / 6,222	$453,461
September 30, 2016	Wheatland	United States	Toyota Amphitheatre	Cole Swindell; The Cadillac Three; Kane Brown; Chris Lane	18,383 / 18,383	$725,206
October 1, 2016	Mountain View	United States	Shoreline Amphitheatre	Cole Swindell; The Cadillac Three; Kane Brown; Chris Lane	21,377 / 22,000	$838,902
October 7, 2016	Phoenix	United States	Ak-Chin Pavilion	Cole Swindell; The Cadillac Three; Kane Brown; Chris Lane	17,029 / 18,173	$723,851
October 8, 2016	Irvine	United States	Irvine Meadows Amphitheatre	Cole Swindell; The Cadillac Three; Kane Brown; Chris Lane	14,889 / 14,889	$768,658
October 9, 2016	Chula Vista	United States	Sleep Train Amphitheatre	Cole Swindell; The Cadillac Three; Kane Brown; Chris Lane	11,988 / 11,988	$622,745
October 13, 2016	Nashville	United States	Bridgestone Arena	Cole Swindell; The Cadillac Three; Kane Brown; Chris Lane	14,695 / 14,695	$693,172
October 14, 2016	Evansville	United States	Ford Center	Cole Swindell; The Cadillac Three; Kane Brown; Chris Lane	8,223 / 8,634	$425,881
October 15, 2016	Kansas City	United States	Sprint Center	Cole Swindell; The Cadillac Three; Kane Brown; Chris Lane	13,381 / 13,381	$711,912
October 22, 2016	Atlanta	United States	Lakewood Amphitheatre	Cole Swindell; The Cadillac Three; Kane Brown; Chris Lane	18,919 / 18,919	$832,013
November 4, 2016	Winnipeg	Canada	MTS Centre	Cole Swindell; The Cadillac Three; Kane Brown; Chris Lane	11,803 / 11,803	$614,590
November 5, 2016	Regina	Canada	Brandt Centre	Cole Swindell; The Cadillac Three; Kane Brown; Chris Lane	5,882 / 5,882	$318,637
November 6, 2016	Saskatoon	Canada	SaskTel Centre	Cole Swindell; The Cadillac Three; Kane Brown; Chris Lane	8,423 / 10,026	$430,779
November 9, 2016	Lethbridge, Alberta	Canada	ENMAX Centre	Cole Swindell; The Cadillac Three; Kane Brown; Chris Lane	4,213 / 4,709	$225,972
November 10, 2016	Spokane	United States	Spokane Arena	Cole Swindell; The Cadillac Three; Kane Brown; Chris Lane	8,951 / 9,899	$474,292
November 11, 2016	Tacoma	United States	Tacoma Dome	Cole Swindell; The Cadillac Three; Kane Brown; Chris Lane	13,480 / 13,480	$687,363
November 12, 2016	Vancouver	Canada	Rogers Arena	Cole Swindell; The Cadillac Three; Kane Brown; Chris Lane	12,492 / 12,492	$579,633
November 16, 2016	Prince George	Canada	CN Centre	Cole Swindell; The Cadillac Three; Kane Brown; Chris Lane	4,192 / 4,832	$211,184
November 17, 2016	Dawson Creek	Canada	EnCana Events Centre	Cole Swindell; The Cadillac Three; Kane Brown; Chris Lane	4,587 / 4,587	$260,900
November 18, 2016	Edmonton	Canada	Rogers Place	Cole Swindell; The Cadillac Three; Kane Brown; Chris Lane	12,473 / 12,473	$688,720
November 19, 2016	Calgary	Canada	Scotiabank Saddledome	Cole Swindell; The Cadillac Three; Kane Brown; Chris Lane	10,326 / 11,411	$522,849
Leg 2: North America
January 27, 2017	Tallahassee	United States	Donald L. Tucker Civic Center	Dustin Lynch; Chris Lane; Ryan Follese	5,721 / 8,105	$331,291
January 28, 2017	Orlando	United States	Amway Center	Dustin Lynch; Chris Lane; Ryan Follese	12,307 / 12,819	$673,062
January 29, 2017	Pembroke Pines	United States	C.B. Smith Park	—	—	—
February 2, 2017	Moline	United States	iWireless Center	Dustin Lynch; Chris Lane; Ryan Follese	8,265 / 8,265	$492,846
February 3, 2017	Columbia	United States	Mizzou Arena	Dustin Lynch; Chris Lane; Ryan Follese	8,415 / 8,415	$559,826
February 4, 2017	Durant	United States	Choctaw Grand Theater	Chris Lane	3,023 / 3,023	$272,980
February 16, 2017	Biloxi	United States	Mississippi Coast Coliseum	Dustin Lynch; Chris Lane	8,001 / 8,945	$545,534
February 17, 2017	Bossier City	United States	CenturyLink Center	Dustin Lynch; Chris Lane	8,848 / 9,225	$550,001
February 18, 2017	Lafayette	United States	Cajundome	Dustin Lynch; Chris Lane	8,564 / 9,982	$519,385
February 23, 2017	Champaign	United States	State Farm Center	Dustin Lynch; Chris Lane; Ryan Follese	7,787 / 9,016	$457,921
February 24, 2017	Omaha	United States	CHI Health Center Omaha	Dustin Lynch; Chris Lane; Ryan Follese	12,860 / 13,842	$766,358
February 25, 2017	Oklahoma City	United States	Chesapeake Energy Arena	Dustin Lynch; Chris Lane; Ryan Follese	10,111 / 11,113	$545,876
March 10, 2017	Uncasville	United States	Mohegan Sun Arena	Dustin Lynch; Chris Lane; Ryan Follese	13,045 / 13,045	$1,225,986
March 11, 2017	Uncasville	United States	Mohegan Sun Arena	Dustin Lynch; Chris Lane; Ryan Follese	13,045 / 13,045	$1,225,986
March 16, 2017	Allentown	United States	PPL Center	Dustin Lynch; Chris Lane	—	—
March 17, 2017	Atlantic City	United States	Boardwalk Hall	Dustin Lynch; Chris Lane	11,515 / 11,515	$697,898
March 18, 2017	Newark	United States	Prudential Center	Dustin Lynch; Chris Lane	13,453 / 13,453	$846,716
March 20, 2017 (Note: This show is a part of Houston Rodeo.)	Houston	United States	NRG Stadium	—	—	—
March 23, 2017	Greensboro	United States	Greensboro Coliseum	Dustin Lynch; Chris Lane	10,587 / 12,327	$558,969
March 24, 2017	Charlottesville	United States	John Paul Jones Arena	Dustin Lynch; Chris Lane	9,295 / 11,090	$531,883
March 25, 2017	University Park	United States	Bryce Jordan Center	Dustin Lynch; Chris Lane	12,019 / 12,019	$713,775
April 20, 2017	Sioux Falls	United States	Denny Sanford Premier Center	Dustin Lynch; Chris Lane	8,490 / 10,496	$543,246
April 21, 2017	Cedar Rapids	United States	UNI-Dome	Dustin Lynch; Chris Lane	11,607 / 12,007	$692,268
April 22, 2017	Springfield	United States	JQH Arena	Dustin Lynch; Chris Lane	8,165 / 8,165	$533,111
April 27, 2017	North Charleston	United States	North Charleston Coliseum	Dustin Lynch; Chris Lane	6,448 / 7,506	$415,949
April 28, 2017	Charleston	United States	Charleston Civic Center	Dustin Lynch; Chris Lane	7,447 / 7,903	$489,604
April 29, 2017	Knoxville	United States	Thompson-Boling Arena	Dustin Lynch; Chris Lane	10,401 / 11,057	$551,266
May 3, 2017	Hamilton	Canada	FirstOntario Centre	Dustin Lynch; Chris Lane	12,806 / 12,806	$788,206
May 4, 2017	Ottawa	Canada	Canadian Tire Centre	Dustin Lynch; Chris Lane	8,730 / 12,544	$540,933
May 5, 2017	Montreal	Canada	Centre Bell	Dustin Lynch; Chris Lane	7,576 / 8,912	$429,336
May 6, 2017	Quebec City	Canada	Centre Videotron	Dustin Lynch; Chris Lane	7,841 / 8,416	$450,481
TOTAL					827,325 / 866,993	$41,535,529

List of festivals
