= Anything Goes (Florida Georgia Line album) =

Studio album by Florida Georgia Line
- Released: October 14, 2014
- Recorded: 2013–14
- Genres: Country; country rock
- Length: 38:32
- Labels: Republic Nashville; Big Loud Mountain
- Producer: Joey Moi

Florida Georgia Line chronology
Here's to the Good Times (2012)	Anything Goes (2014)	Dig Your Roots (2016)

Singles from Anything Goes
- 1. "Dirt" Released: July 8, 2014; 2. "Sun Daze" Released: September 16, 2014; 3. "Sippin' on Fire" Released: February 16, 2015; 4. "Anything Goes" Released: June 15, 2015; 5. "Confession" Released: November 3, 2015

Alternative cover
- Cover for Target deluxe edition.

Professional ratings
Review scores
Source	Rating
Allmusic	3/5 stars
Billboard	4/5 stars

Anything Goes is the second studio album by American country music duo Florida Georgia Line. It was released on October 14, 2014, by Republic Nashville. The release of the album was announced August 15 from Central Park in New York City on Good Morning America. The album was produced by Joey Moi. Its first single, "Dirt", became Florida Georgia Line's sixth number one hit when it peaked at number one on the Billboard Hot Country Songs chart. The duo embarked on the Anything Goes Tour to further promote the album.

== Critical reception ==
Anything Goes has received mixed reviews from critics. Writing for Allmusic, Stephen Thomas Erlewine criticized the anonymity of the duo and their music, claiming that "they're playing to the largest possible audience, so nobody should be surprised that Anything Goes is so broad it avoids such messiness as personality." He awarded the album 3 stars out of 5. Tom Roland awarded the album 4 out of 5 stars in his review for Billboard, saying that "it shores up the duo's country flanks, and demonstrates that FGL intends to aggressively protect its progressive place in the genre, one that the act essentially designed on its own."

== Commercial performance ==
The album debuted at number one on the Billboard 200 with first-week sales of 197,000 copies. The album was certified Gold by the RIAA on December 1, 2014, and Platinum on March 29, 2016, for combined sales and streams of a million units. As of June 2015, the album has sold 858,000 copies in the US.

It also reached number one on the Top Country Albums chart.

In Canada, the album debuted at number two on the Canadian Albums Chart, selling 16,000 copies.

== Singles ==
"Dirt" was released as the lead single from the album on July 8, 2014. A huge commercial success, it peaked at number one on both the Hot Country Songs and Country Airplay charts. It also peaked at number 11 on the Billboard Hot 100.

"Sun Daze" was released as the second single on September 16, 2014, and peaked at number one on the Country Airplay chart. It also peaked at number 44 on the Hot 100.

"Sippin' on Fire" was released as the third single on February 16, 2015, and peaked at number one on the Country Airplay chart. It also peaked at number 40 on the Hot 100.

"Anything Goes" was released as the fourth single on June 15, 2015, and peaked at number three on the Country Airplay chart. It also peaked at number 55 on the Hot 100.

"Confession" was released as the fifth and final single from the album on November 3, 2015, and peaked at number one on the Country Airplay chart. It also peaked at number 53 on the Hot 100.

== Track listing ==
The album's track listing was announced on August 15.

No.	Title	Writer(s)	Length
1.	"Anything Goes"	Felix McTeigue; Chris Tompkins; Craig Wiseman	3:39
2.	"Sun Daze"	Tyler Hubbard; Brian Kelley; Cary Barlowe; Jesse Frasure; Sarah Buxton	3:04
3.	"Good Good"	Hubbard; Kelley; Barlowe; Frasure; Buxton	3:17
4.	"Dirt"	Tompkins; Rodney Clawson	3:50
5.	"Smile"	Chris DeStefano; Dallas Davidson; Ashley Gorley	2:50
6.	"Sippin' on Fire"	Clawson; Matt Dragstrem; Cole Taylor	3:14
7.	"Smoke"	Josh Kear; Tompkins	3:35
8.	"Bumpin' the Night"	Bart Allmand; Tompkins; Clawson	3:42
9.	"Angel"	Hubbard; Kelley; Clawson; Ross Copperman	3:31
10.	"Confession"	Clawson; Copperman; Matt Jenkins	3:11
11.	"Like You Ain't Even Gone"	Hubbard; Kelley; Tompkins; Clawson	3:31
12.	"Every Night"	Hubbard; Kelley; DeStefano; Gorley	3:06

Deluxe Edition (Target exclusive)
No.	Title	Writer(s)	Length
13.	"Girl on the Radio"	Nicolle Galyon; Hubbard; Kelley; Jimmy Robbins	2:47
14.	"Dance for Me"	Clawson; Copperman; Hubbard; Kelley	2:39
15.	"That's What's Up"	Copperman; Hubbard; Kelley; Jon Nite	3:25

Expanded edition (digital-only)
No.	Title	Writer(s)	Length
13.	"Girl on the Radio"	Nicolle Galyon; Hubbard; Kelley; Jimmy Robbins	2:47
14.	"Dance for Me"	Clawson; Copperman; Hubbard; Kelley	2:39
15.	"That's What's Up"	Copperman; Hubbard; Kelley; Jon Nite	3:25
16.	"Dirt" (Acoustic Remix)	Tompkins; Clawson	3:48
17.	"Sippin' on Fire" (Acoustic)	Clawson; Dragstrem; Taylor	3:11
18.	"Sun Daze" (Acoustic)	Hubbard; Kelley; Barlowe; Frasure; Buxton	3:04
19.	"Anything Goes" (Acoustic)	McTeigue; Tompkins; Wiseman	3:33
20.	"Confession" (Acoustic)	Clawson; Copperman; Jenkins	3:04
21.	"Cruise" (iTunes Live Session)	Hubbard; Kelley; Joey Moi; Chase Rice; Jesse Rice	3:23
22.	"Get Your Shine On" (iTunes Live Session)	Hubbard; Kelley; Clawson; Tompkins	3:38
23.	"Dayum, Baby" (iTunes Live Session) (featuring Colbie Caillat)	Hubbard; Kelley; Clawson; David Lee Murphy	3:23
24.	"Stay" (iTunes Live Session)	Moi; John Fred Young; Chris Robertson; Jon Lawhon; Ben Wells	3:13
25.	"Here's to the Good Times" (iTunes Live Session)	Clawson; Tompkins; Lynn Hutton	4:24
26.	"Friends in Low Places" (iTunes Live Session)	Dewayne Blackwell; Earl Bud Lee	4:56
27.	"It'z Just What We Do" (iTunes Live Session)	Hubbard; Kelley; Clawson	3:32

== Personnel ==
=== Florida Georgia Line ===
- Tyler Hubbard – vocals
- Brian Kelley – vocals

=== Additional musicians ===
- Tom Bukovac – electric guitar
- Sarah Buxton – background vocals
- Rodney Clawson – background vocals
- Wes Hightower – background vocals
- Charlie Judge – keyboards
- Joey Moi – acoustic guitar, electric guitar, percussion, background vocals, whistle
- Russ Pahl – pedal steel guitar
- Danny Rader – bouzouki, acoustic guitar, mandolin
- Adam Shoenfeld – electric guitar
- Jimmie Lee Sloas – bass guitar
- Bryan Sutton – banjo, bouzouki, acoustic guitar, dobro, mandolin
- Chris Tompkins – acoustic guitar, keyboards, percussion, background vocals
- Ilya Toshinsky – banjo, dobro, acoustic guitar, electric guitar

== Charts and certifications ==
=== Weekly charts ===
Chart (2014–2015)	Peak position
Australian Albums (ARIA)	20
Canadian Albums (Billboard)	2
US Billboard 200	1
US Top Country Albums (Billboard)	1

=== Year-end charts ===
Chart (2014)	Position
Canadian Albums (Billboard)	45
US Billboard 200	47
US Top Country Albums (Billboard)	10
Chart (2015)	Position
US Billboard 200	23
US Top Country Albums (Billboard)	6
Chart (2016)	Position
US Billboard 200	111
US Top Country Albums (Billboard)	36
Chart (2017)	Position
US Top Country Albums (Billboard)	43

=== Decade-end charts ===
Chart (2010–2019)	Position
US Billboard 200	170

=== Singles ===
Year	Single	Peak chart positions				
Year	Single	US Country	US Country Airplay	US	CAN Country	CAN
2014	"Dirt"	1	1	11	1	10
2014	"Sun Daze"	3	1	44	2	41
2015	"Sippin' on Fire"	3	1	40	1	36
2015	"Anything Goes"	6	3	55	1	51
2015	"Confession"	7	1	53	1	73

=== Certifications ===
Region	Certification	Certified units/sales
Canada (Music Canada)	Platinum	80,000^{^}
United States (RIAA)	Platinum	1,000,000^{‡} / 858,000
^{^} Shipments figures based on certification alone.

=== Other charted songs ===
Year	Title	Peak chart positions		
Year	Title	US Country	US	CAN
2014	"Bumpin' the Night"	15	69	55
2014	"Good Good"	20	—	68
"—" denotes releases that did not chart
