= Brian Kelley =

American musician (born 1985)

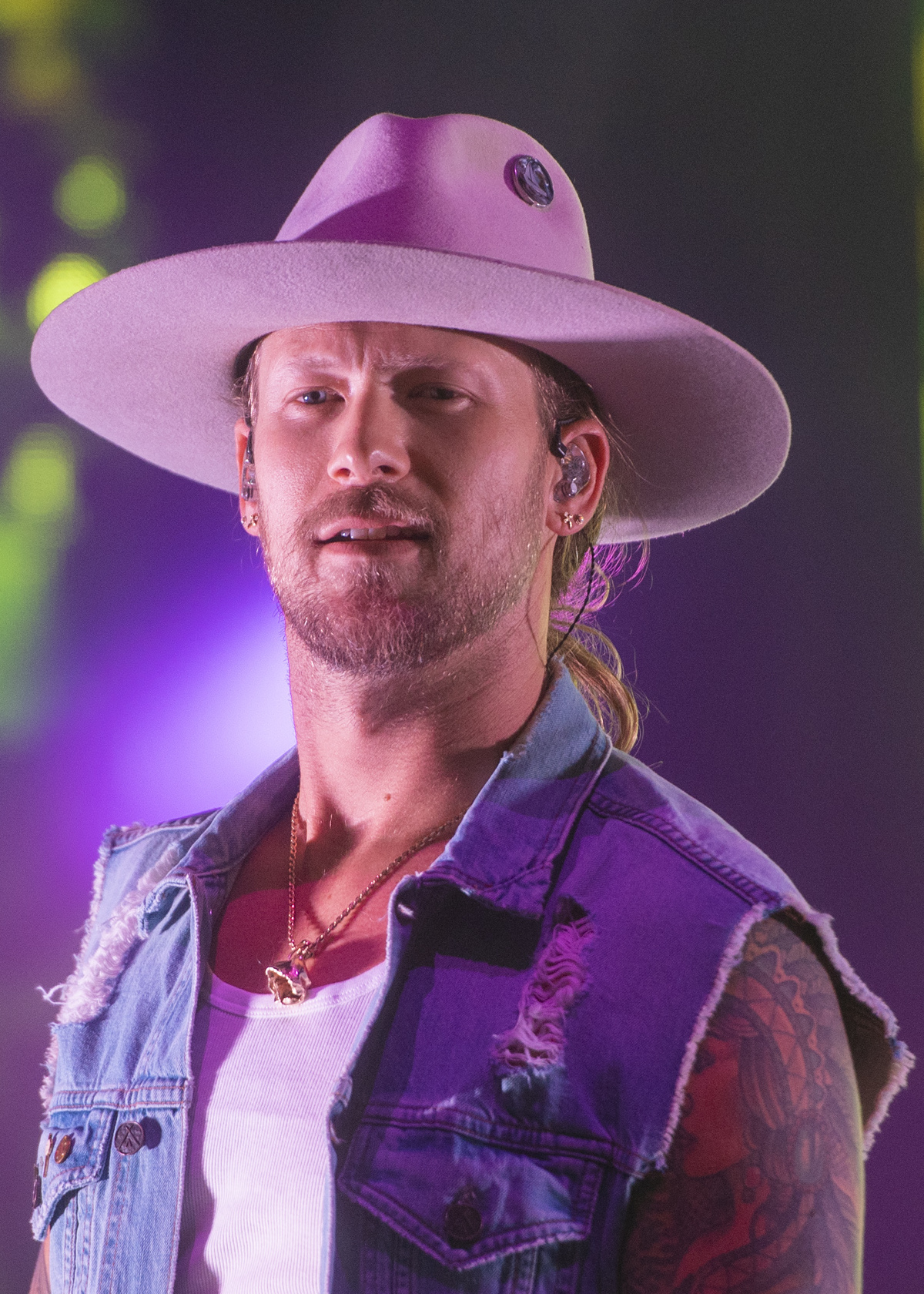
- Brian Kelley during 2018 USO concert

Background information
- Born: Brian Edward Kelley; August 26, 1985 (age 41)
- Origin: Ormond Beach, Florida, U.S.
- Genres: Country; country pop; country rock
- Instruments: Vocals; guitar
- Years active: 2010–present
- Labels: Nashville South; Big Machine; Warner Nashville
- Member of: Florida Georgia Line
- Spouse: Brittney Cole (m. 2013)
- Website: officialbriankelley.com

Brian Edward Kelley (born August 26, 1985) is an American musician, best known as a member of the Nashville-based duo Florida Georgia Line. Kelley is from Ormond Beach, Florida, and enjoyed playing sports and music growing up. He moved to Nashville to go to school and played baseball at Belmont University, where he met Tyler Hubbard, the other member of Florida Georgia Line.

== Early life ==
Kelley was born on August 26, 1985, in Ormond Beach, Florida, and is the son of Ed and Mary Margaret Kelley. Growing up, Kelley enjoyed sports and writing and spent most of his time playing baseball or at the beach. As he got older he started to spend more time writing music and leading worship at his church. He also developed a strong love for playing guitar. When he was in his teens, his sister began to introduce him to country artists by playing him tapes on the way to the beach in exchange for Kelley washing her car. By the time Kelley was ready to graduate from Seabreeze High School in 2004 and Daytona State College in 2007, he was splitting his time between baseball (playing college baseball at Daytona State College and Florida State University and being scouted by the pros) and writing music. However, when he was doing more bench sitting than playing, he filled the void with writing. He later decided to move to Belmont University.

== Career ==
=== Florida Georgia Line (2010–2022) ===
Kelley was introduced to Tyler Hubbard at Belmont University in 2007 while they were in a campus worship group together. The two became great friends, and began playing guitar and writing songs together. The two friends began playing writers rounds throughout Nashville. In 2009, the duo decided they wanted to pursue music as a career so they started playing shows throughout the American South. In 2010, they independently recorded and digitally distributed their first EP, Anything Like Me. After releasing that EP, they were discovered at a county fair by Nickelback's producer, Joey Moi. After writing and polishing songs for two years, the duo released their second EP It'z Just What We Do in 2012. Major labels became interested in the duo when their debut single, "Cruise", first hit satellite radio on "The Highway" channel and began selling well on iTunes, leading to a record deal with Republic Nashville and Big Machine Label Group.

In the fall of 2011, Kelley signed a publishing deal with Big Loud Shirt.

The duo released their first studio album, Here's to the Good Times, on December 4, 2012, with Republic Nashville. This album was the sixth best selling album of 2013. "Cruise", the first single on the album, reached number 1 on the Country Airplay chart dated December 15, 2012. A remix of "Cruise" featuring Nelly later hit number 4 on the Billboard Hot 100. The song is also the best selling country digital song of all time, with sales of over 7 million, and it spent 24 weeks at number 1 on Hot Country songs. The other singles from this album include "Get Your Shine On", "Round Here", "Stay", and "This Is How We Roll".

Florida Georgia Line announced on August 15, 2014, that their second album would be titled Anything Goes, and would be released on October 14, 2014. They released the album's first single, "Dirt", on July 8, 2014. Other singles from this album include "Sun Daze", "Sippin' On Fire", "Anything Goes" and "Confession".

The duo's third album, Dig Your Roots was released on August 26, 2016. Singles include "H.O.L.Y.", "May We All", "God, Your Mama, and Me" and "Smooth".

They released their fourth studio album, Can't Say I Ain't Country, on February 15, 2019. Singles include "Simple", "Talk You Out of It" and "Blessings".

Their fifth studio album, Life Rolls On, was released on February 12, 2021. It was co-produced by the duo and Corey Crowder, and includes the singles "I Love My Country" and "Long Live".

In 2022, Florida Georgia Line decided to take an indefinite hiatus from touring as well as “taking a break” from making music together as both of the musicians went on to currently focus on their solo careers.

=== Tree Vibez Music and Round Here Records (2015–present) ===
In 2015, Hubbard and Kelley started their own artist development and music publishing company called Tree Vibez Music. Since the company began, they have signed writer Jordan Schmidt, writer Jimmie Deeghan, writer/artist Drew Castle as well as singer-songwriters Canaan Smith and RaeLynn. In 2019, Hubbard and Kelley launched Round Here Records; an independent label with Smith signed as the flagship artist.

=== Solo career and Nashville South Records (2021–present) ===
In January 2021, Kelley indicated his intentions to have a solo music career while remaining part of Florida Georgia Line, with the support of fellow duo-member Tyler Hubbard. In April 2021, he announced that he had launched his own label, Nashville South Records, to release his new music in partnership with Warner Music Nashville. Kelley referred to himself as a "Beach Cowboy", announcing that new music would be coming with a full album slated for release in late 2021. On April 13, 2021, he released the extended play BK's Wave Pack. The songs from the EP were included on his debut studio album Sunshine State of Mind, which was released on June 25, 2021. Kelly has also launched a stage musical, entitled "May We All", inspired by the Florida Georgia Line song of the same name.

In June 2022, Kelley moved to Big Machine Records, and released the song "American Spirit" the next month.

In January 2024, Kelley released the single, “Trucks, Ducks, Bucks & Beer.”

In 2025, Kelley competed in season thirteen of The Masked Singer as "Mad Scientist Monster". He finished in fourth place. Thanks to Taika Waititi as "Detective Lucky Duck", there was a reference to how Florida Georgia Line's "Cruise" bested Robin Thicke's "Blurred Lines" for "Single of the Year" at the 2013 American Music Awards.

== Personal life ==
In December 2013, he married his wife, Brittney Marie (née Cole) Kelley. Kelley and his wife have no children; she has stated that while they are open to having a family if it is "in God's plan", they are also "at peace" if children are not part of their future.

Kelley and his wife operate the Tribe Kelley Surf Post in Grayton Beach, Florida, which serves as the storefront and on‑site studio for their Tribe Kelley clothing line.

In July 2024, Kelley released the single, "Make America Great Again", as an endorsement of Donald Trump in the 2024 United States presidential election.

== Discography ==
=== Studio albums ===
Studio album, with selected details
Title	Details
Sunshine State of Mind	Release date: June 25, 2021; Label: Nashville South / Warner Music Nashville; Format: Digital download, streaming, CD
Tennessee Truth	Release date: May 10, 2024; Label: Nashville South / Big Machine; Format: CD, digital download, streaming
Ed & Mary Margaret's Son	Release date: October 25, 2024; Label: Nashville South / Big Machine

=== Extended plays ===
Extended play, with selected details
Title	Details
BK's Wave Pack	Release date: April 13, 2021; Label: Nashville South / Warner Music Nashville; Format: Digital download, streaming

=== Singles ===
List of charted singles
Title	Year	Peak positions	Album
Title	Year	US Country Airplay	Album
"See You Next Summer"	2023	28	Tennessee Truth
"Acres"	2024	—	Tennessee Truth

== Filmography ==
Year	Title	Role	Notes
2025	The Masked Singer	Himself/Mad Scientist Monster	Season 13 contestant
2020	Songland	Himself/Florida Georgia Line	Episode 6 musical guest

== See also ==
- List of people from Florida
