= Simple (Florida Georgia Line song) =

Single by Florida Georgia Line

from the album Can't Say I Ain't Country
- Released: June 1, 2018
- Genre: Country pop; country folk
- Length: 3:05
- Label: BLMG
- Songwriter(s): Tyler Hubbard; Brian Kelley; Michael Hardy; Mark Holman
- Producer(s): Joey Moi; Florida Georgia Line; Mark Holman

Florida Georgia Line singles chronology
"Up Down" (2017)	"Simple" (2018)	"Talk You Out of It" (2018)

Music videos
- "Simple" on YouTube
- "Simple (Lyric Video)" on YouTube

"Simple" is a song by American country music duo Florida Georgia Line. It is their fifteenth solo single release, and the first from their fourth studio album Can't Say I Ain't Country. Written by duo members Tyler Hubbard and Brian Kelley along with Michael Hardy and Mark Holman, the song expresses romantic love as a "simple" concept. The song has been promoted through the use of black-and-white photography on the duo's Instagram account, along with a music video directed by Justin Clough.

== Content ==
The song was one of two tracks leaked in advance of Florida Georgia Line's upcoming fourth studio album. It is their first solo single release since "Smooth" in late 2017, although the duo had hit singles as featured artists on Morgan Wallen's "Up Down", Hailee Steinfeld's "Let Me Go" and Bebe Rexha's "Meant to Be" in between. Duo members Tyler Hubbard and Brian Kelley wrote the song with Michael Hardy and Mark Holman, and Joey Moi produced the track. It features "banjos and a whistling melody", and a hook in which the two spell out the title. Chris Parton of Rolling Stone Country compared the song's sound to Mumford & Sons and Edward Sharpe and the Magnetic Zeros.

Hubbard and Kelley both discussed the song in an interview with Nash Country Daily. Hubbard said that "Majority of the time, I just find that for us it’s just easy to keep it simple. There's no need to complicate it, especially when it comes to love and [our] relationships with our wives and our families. Just a little reminder to simplify things every now and then and have a good time while you do it", while Kelley stated that it was "the next step for FGL" and a "fresh sound". The two also stated in an interview on iHeartRadio's website that the two drew lyrical inspiration from their relationships with their own wives and families. Thematically, the song is about keeping a relationship "simple" and expressing the emotion of romantic love in simple fashions.

The duo promoted the song on Instagram by erasing all other pictures from the account and replacing them with captioned black-and-white photos.

== Commercial performance ==
Simple debuted at No. 24 on the Country Airplay chart on its release on June 1, 2018. It peaked at No. 1 on Country Airplay in October 2018, which is Florida Georgia Line's 14th No. 1 on the chart, making them a duo or group with the second-most No. 1s on the chart, tying with Rascal Flatts behind Brooks & Dunn. The song was certified double platinum on September 13, 2019. The song has sold 367,000 copies in the United States as of January 2019. As of May 2024, the song had 388,804,313 streams on Spotify.

== Music video ==
Directed by Justin Clough, the music video features a grandfather recalling a romantic story to his grandchildren, interspersed with scenes from his wife and his younger self crashing a party in the 1930s.

== Charts ==
=== Weekly charts ===
Chart (2018)	Peak position
Australia Country (TMN)	2
Canada (Canadian Hot 100)	28
Canada Country (Billboard)	1
US Billboard Hot 100	32
US Country Airplay (Billboard)	1
US Hot Country Songs (Billboard)	2

=== Year-end charts ===
Chart (2018)	Position
Canada (Canadian Hot 100)	86
US Billboard Hot 100	82
US Country Airplay (Billboard)	11
US Hot Country Songs (Billboard)	7

== Certifications ==
Region	Certification	Certified units/sales
Australia (ARIA)	Gold	35,000^{‡}
Canada (Music Canada)	2× Platinum	160,000^{‡}
New Zealand (RMNZ)	Platinum	30,000^{‡}
United States (RIAA)	2× Platinum	2,000,000^{‡}
^{‡} Sales+streaming figures based on certification alone.
