= It'z Just What We Do =

EP by Florida Georgia Line
- Released: May 15, 2012
- Recorded: 2011
- Genre: Country
- Label: Big Loud Mountain
- Producer: Joey Moi

Florida Georgia Line chronology
Anything Like Me (2010)	It'z Just What We Do (2012)	Here's to the Good Times (2012)

It'z Just What We Do is the second EP by American country music duo Florida Georgia Line. It was released in May 2012, by Big Loud Mountain. All five songs from the extended play later appeared on their debut studio album, Here's to the Good Times (2012).

== Critical reception ==
Jessica Nicholson of Country Weekly gave the album a very positive review, saying that "Newcomers Brian Kelley and Tyler Hubbard of Florida Georgia Line first met while students at Nashville’s Belmont University, and melded their diverse musical backgrounds to create their first five-song EP. No softhearted love songs here, though. Producer Joey Moi (Jake Owen, Nickelback) is a fine match for the duo’s country-meets-alt-rock sound."

== Commercial performance ==
The album peaked at number 18 on the Top Country Albums chart. Additionally, it peaked on number 105 on the US Billboard 200, on number 45 on the Independent Albums chart, and reached number one on the Top Heatseekers chart.

== Track listing ==
No.	Title	Writer(s)	Length
1.	"Cruise"	Tyler Hubbard; Brian Kelley; Joey Moi; Chase Rice; Jesse Rice	3:29
2.	"Get Your Shine On"	Hubbard; Kelley; Rodney Clawson; Chris Tompkins	3:33
3.	"Tip It Back"	Hubbard; Kelley; Clawson	3:45
4.	"Tell Me How You Like It"	Hubbard; Kelley; Tompkins	3:47
5.	"It'z Just What We Do"	Hubbard; Kelley; Clawson	3:36

== Charts and certifications ==
=== Weekly charts ===
Chart (2012)	Peak position
US Billboard 200	105
US Top Country Albums (Billboard)	18
US Heatseekers Albums (Billboard)	1
US Independent Albums (Billboard)	45
