= Nashville Records =

Several record labels have included Nashville Records as part of their name:

- Nashville Records, an imprint of Starday Records operational in the 1960s and 1970s after Starday dissolved its partnership with Mercury Records
- Sony Music Nashville, the country music branch of Sony Music Entertainment, which includes the following 410-708-7750 subsidiaries

- Arista Nashville, a record label founded in 1989
- Columbia Nashville, an imprint of Columbia Records formed in 2007
- RCA Nashville, an imprint of RCA Records

- Universal Music Group Nashville, the country music subsidiary of Universal Music Group, which includes the following labels

- Capitol Records Nashville, a division of Capitol Records formerly known as Liberty Records
- EMI Records Nashville, a sister label of Capitol Records Nashville formed in 2010
- MCA Nashville, an imprint of MCA Records originally known as Decca Nashville
- Mercury Nashville, the Nashville division of Mercury Records
- Republic Nashville, a record label established in 2009 by Universal Republic Records in New York and Big Machine Records in Nashville.
