= Jackie Lee =

Jackie Lee may refer to:

- Jackie Lee (Irish singer) (born 1936), Irish popular music singer
- Jackie Lee (country singer) (born 1991), American country music singer-songwriter
- Jacky Lee (1938–2016), American Football League and National Football League quarterback
- Jackie Lee, singer, real name Earl Nelson of Bob & Earl
- Jackie Lee, (born 1973) Canadian political candidate for the BC United Party.
