= Felix McTeigue =

American songwriter

Edward McTeigue
- Birth name: Edward McTeigue
- Also known as: FDR
- Born: 1971 or 1972
- Died: July 24, 2020 (aged 48)
- Occupation(s): Record producer, songwriter, musician

Edward "Felix" McTeigue (born 1971 or 1972; died July 24, 2020) was a Grammy Award-nominated record producer and songwriter.

== Career ==
Notable songs by McTeigue include platinum-selling and number one Mediabase hit "Anything Goes" for the band Florida Georgia Line. In 2017 McTeigue was nominated for a Grammy award for "Wreck You", a song co-written and released by Lori McKenna. Additionally, "Wreck You" was nominated for 2018 American Award for Americana song of the year. McTeigue also co-wrote Dallas Smith's top five Canadian Country song "Jumped Right In" which was certified gold in 2014.

McTeigue began to produce records for other artists. Other writers and performers he collaborated with include Mary Gauthier, Amy Helm and Katharine McPhee.

Previously a singer-songwriter himself, McTeigue released several critically acclaimed solo albums and performed at venues including The Fillmore in San Francisco, The Bottom Line in New York City and the Iron Horse Music Hall in Northampton, Massachusetts.

McTeigue died in 2020 after complications from surgery.

== Family ==
McTeigue's mother Maggie Roche (1951–2017) formed folk/pop group The Roches with her sisters Suzzy and Terre. Singer-songwriter Lucy Wainwright Roche, Suzzy's daughter with Loudon Wainwright III, is McTeigue's cousin.

== Tributes ==
Singer-songwriter Anaïs Mitchell wrote "On Your Way (Felix Song)" about McTeigue's passing for her 2022 self-titled album.

Singer-songwriter Roger Street Friedman wrote "About You" about McTeigue's death for his 2022 album "Love Hope Trust". The album itself is dedicated to McTeigue.

== Discography ==
=== Solo studio albums ===
- Felix McTeigue (album) (2001)
- Radio Perfecto (album) (2004)
- The New Deal (album as FDR) (2006)

=== FILO ===
- Hoi Polloi (album) (1998)

=== Felix McTeigue & Jason Covert ===
- Carnivora (album) (2010)

== See also ==
- List of songwriters
- List of people from Brooklyn
