= Smooth (Florida Georgia Line song) =

Single by Florida Georgia Line

from the album Dig Your Roots
- Released: August 13, 2017
- Genre: Country
- Length: 2:49
- Label: Big Machine; Big Loud Mountain
- Songwriter(s): Tyler Hubbard; Brian Kelley; Nicolle Galyon; Jordan Schmidt
- Producer(s): Joey Moi

Florida Georgia Line singles chronology
"God, Your Mama, and Me" (2017)	"Smooth" (2017)	"Let Me Go" (2017)

Music video
- "Smooth" on YouTube

"Smooth" is a song recorded by American country music duo Florida Georgia Line. It was released as the fourth and final single from the duo's third studio album, Dig Your Roots. The song was written by members Tyler Hubbard and Brian Kelley with Nicolle Galyon and Jordan Schmidt. The duo's fourth headlining concert tour, the Smooth Tour, also takes its title from this song.

== Commercial performance ==
As of November 2017, the song has sold 130,000 copies in the United States. It was certified Gold on January 12, 2018.

== Charts ==
"Smooth" has reached a peak of number 14 on the Billboard Country Airplay chart and number 16 on the Billboard Hot Country Songs chart, becoming Florida Georgia Line's first single to miss the top 10 on either chart. It peaked at number 89 on the Billboard Hot 100, becoming the duo's lowest-charting single on the chart.

=== Weekly charts ===
Chart (2017)	Peak position
Canada Country (Billboard)	11
US Billboard Hot 100	89
US Country Airplay (Billboard)	14
US Hot Country Songs (Billboard)	16

=== Year-end charts ===
Chart (2017)	Position
US Hot Country Songs (Billboard)	68
