= Confession (Florida Georgia Line song) =

Single by Florida Georgia Line

from the album Anything Goes
- Released: November 3, 2015
- Genre: Country rock
- Length: 3:11
- Label: Republic Nashville
- Songwriters: Rodney Clawson; Ross Copperman; Matt Jenkins
- Producer: Joey Moi

Florida Georgia Line singles chronology
"Anything Goes" (2015)	"Confession" (2015)	"H.O.L.Y." (2016)

Music videos
- "Confession" on YouTube
- "Confession (Lyric Video)" on YouTube

"Confession" is a song written by Rodney Clawson, Ross Copperman, and Matt Jenkins, and recorded by American country music duo Florida Georgia Line, released on November 3, 2015. It is the fifth and final single from their second studio album, Anything Goes.

== History ==
Florida Georgia Line debuted the single at the 2015 Country Music Association (CMA) awards telecast in November 2015. Brian Kelley, one-half of the duo, told Nash Country Weekly that "[It] bookends the album—with 'Dirt' really well... I think it closes the Anything Goes chapter."

== Content ==
The song is a mid-tempo ballad about a man who "takes a late-night drive through the country in an attempt to clear his brain" and "takes stock of his life", ultimately praying to God while drinking beer.

== Critical reception ==
An uncredited article about Anything Goes published by Taste of Country stated that "The songwriters penned a chorus that's both emotional and sonically satisfying, and Moi does a fine job in amplifying the message."

== Commercial performance ==
The song first entered the chart at No. 39 on Billboard's Hot Country Songs chart, and No. 47 on the Country Airplay chart on its release. The song peaked at No. 7 on Hot Country Songs for chart dated April 9, 2016, and topped the Country Airplay chart dated May 7, 2016. Florida Georgia Line joined Zac Brown Band as the only country acts to have four songs reaching No. 1 on Country Airplay from each of their first two albums. The song has sold 293,000 copies in the US as of May 2016. It was certified Platinum by the RIAA on May 23, 2017.

== Music video ==
TK McKamy directed the music video. It features the duo singing the song in an abandoned church.

== Charts ==
=== Weekly chart ===
Chart (2015–2016)	Peak position
Canada Hot 100 (Billboard)	73
Canada Country (Billboard)	1
US Billboard Hot 100	53
US Country Airplay (Billboard)	1
US Hot Country Songs (Billboard)	7

=== Year end charts ===
Chart (2016)	Position
US Country Airplay (Billboard)	7
US Hot Country Songs (Billboard)	27

=== Certifications ===
Region	Certification	Certified units/sales
United States (RIAA)	Platinum	1,000,000^{‡}
^{‡} Sales+streaming figures based on certification alone.
