= Jackie Lee (country singer) =

American country music singer-songwriter (born 1991)

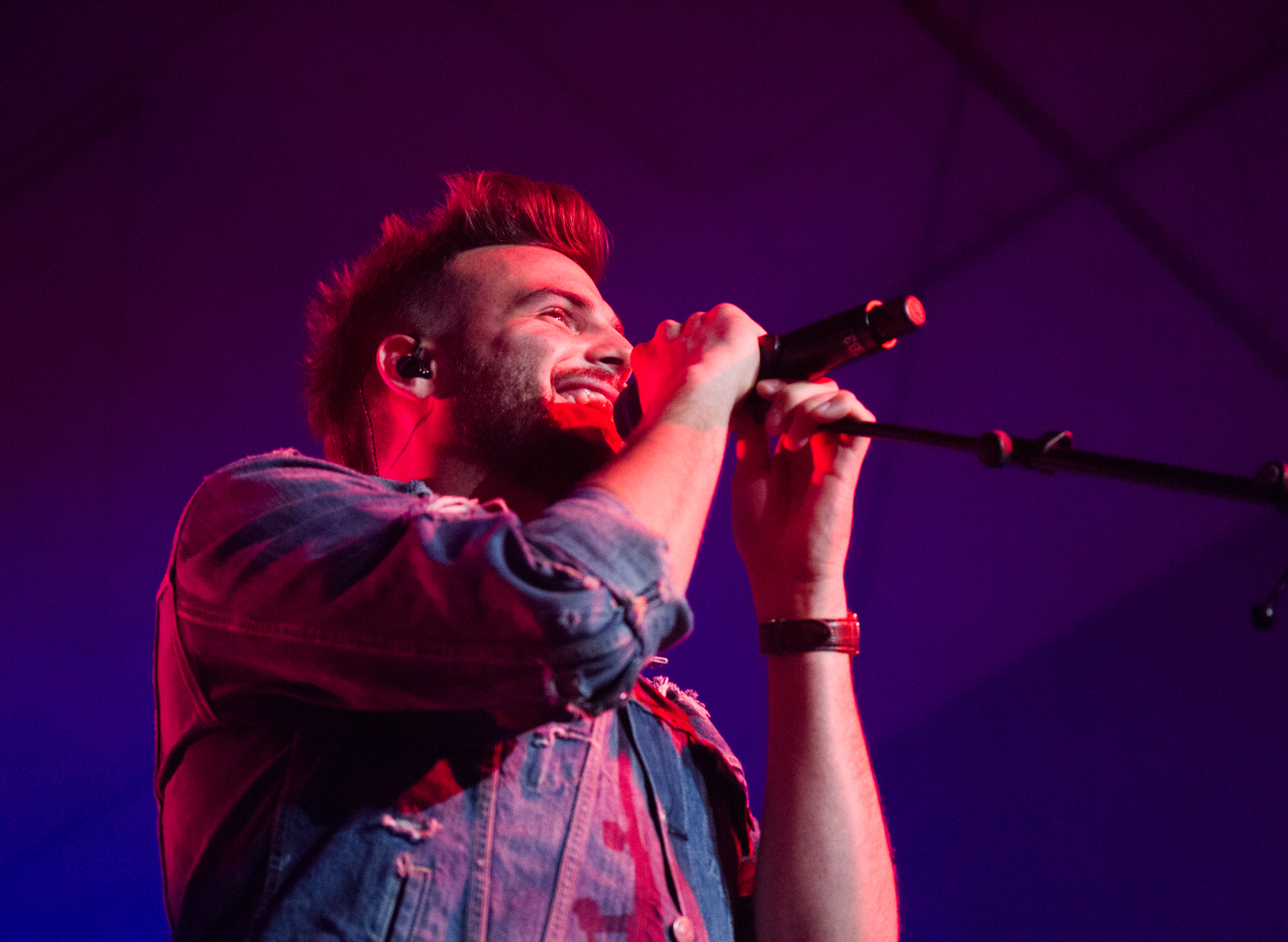
- Jackie Lee performing in concert in 2017

Background information
- Born: Jackie Lee Midkiff; October 2, 1991 (age 34); Maryville, Tennessee
- Genres: Country
- Occupation: Singer-songwriter
- Instrument: Vocals
- Years active: 2012–present
- Labels: Republic Nashville, Broken Bow Records
- Website: www.jackielee.com

Jackie Lee (born October 2, 1991 in Maryville, Tennessee) is an American country music singer-songwriter.

== Career ==
Before pursuing a career in music, Lee played high school football at Alcoa High, where he was a teammate of future NFL receiver Randall Cobb. He grew up singing in church and his dad was a professional musician. Lee was briefly signed to Republic Nashville in 2012.

He signed to Broken Bow Records and released his debut single, "She Does", in September 2014. The song was written by Kelley Lovelace and Neil Thrasher and originally put on hold by Kenny Chesney.

Markos Papadatos of Digital Journal gave the song four stars out of five, writing that "Lee's vocals on 'She Does' are rich, sultry and polished, where the listener can easily recall country singer-songwriters Will Hoge and James Otto." The song also received a favorable review from Taste of Country, which called it "a country love song that stands out from so many others on the radio" and said that "Lee is a pure country vocalist who will attract both fans of traditional country and fans of a slicker sound." "She Does" was the most added song at country radio the week of September 15, 2014. It debuted at number 57 on the Billboard Country Airplay chart for the week of October 4.

Lee made his Grand Ole Opry debut in September 2014. Lee's second single, "Headphones", was released to country radio on May 11, 2015. Lee released his third single, "Leave the Light On", through Spotify on July 8, 2016. A fourth single, "Getting Over You", was released to country radio in 2016. Lee parted ways with Broken Bow in July 2017.

== Discography ==
=== Singles ===
Year	Single	Peak positions	Album
Year	Single	US Country Airplay	Album
2014	"She Does"	49	n/a
2015	"Headphones"	60	n/a
2016	"Leave the Light On"	—	n/a
2016	"Getting Over You"	51	n/a
"—" denotes releases that did not chart

=== Music videos ===
Year	Video
2018	"Long Year"
