= Florida Georgia Line =

American country music duo

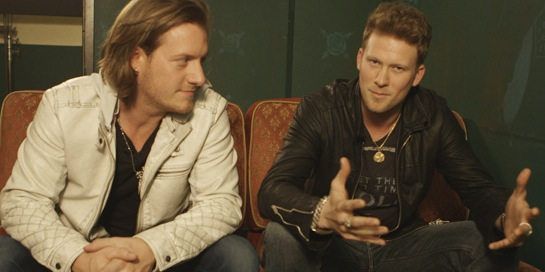
- Tyler Hubbard (left) and Brian Kelley (right) in 2013

Background information
- Origin: Nashville, Tennessee, U.S.
- Genres: Country; country pop; country rock
- Years active: 2010–2022 • 2026–present
- Labels: Republic, BMLG
- Members: Tyler Hubbard; Brian Kelley
- Website: floridageorgialine.com

Florida Georgia Line is an American country music duo. It was founded in 2010 by vocalists and songwriters Tyler Hubbard of Georgia and Brian Kelley of Florida. Its 2012 debut single, "Cruise", broke two major sales records: it was downloaded over seven million times, making it the first country song ever to receive the Diamond RIAA certification, and it became the best-selling digital country song, with 24 weeks at number one, until it was surpassed in July 2017 by Sam Hunt's "Body Like a Back Road." The duo's music style is described as "bro-country", which incorporates production elements from rock and hip-hop, and tends to cover subject matter such as partying, drinking, driving trucks, and sexual attraction.

Florida Georgia Line was formed in 2010 in Nashville, Tennessee, as a cover band. It signed to the Big Loud label in December 2011 and in 2012, it released its second EP, It'z Just What We Do, which charted on the Billboard Top Country Albums chart. Florida Georgia Line then signed with Republic Nashville, part of Big Machine Records, and released Anything Goes (2014), Dig Your Roots (2016), Can't Say I Ain't Country (2019), and Life Rolls On (2021). The duo went on hiatus in 2022, then broke up, after which both members began solo careers.

Florida Georgia Line announced a reunion and performed at the CMA FEST 2026 in Nashville.

== History ==
=== Early history ===
Musicians Brian Kelley and Tyler Hubbard met in 2008 at Belmont University through a campus worship group, and following graduation, decided to give themselves two years to succeed as a country duo. They moved in together and began several odd jobs to pay bills, while playing clubs on the weekends. While independent, they recorded and digitally distributed their first EP, Anything Like Me (2010). They were discovered by Nickelback producer Joey Moi at a county fair, and the three began recording in studio together. Unlike typical country music sessions, the group spent days polishing songs, which were collected on the duo's second EP, It'z Just What We Do (2012). The duo modeled their sound on bands such as Nickelback, Shinedown, and Three Days Grace, while Moi aimed for each song to resemble hair metal group Def Leppard in structure. Major labels became interested when the song "Cruise" first aired on The Highway channel on SiriusXM and began selling well in the iTunes Store, leading to a deal with Republic Nashville and Big Machine Records.

=== 2010–2013: Anything Like Me, It'z Just What We Do and Here's to the Good Times ===
Florida Georgia Line's first EP, released on December 14, 2010, is a six-song EP produced with Wesley Walker. All of the songs were written by either by just Hubbard or Hubbard and Kelley. The EP consists of the songs "You're Country," "Now That She's Gone," "Man I Am Today," "Never Let Her Go", "Black Tears," and "Backwoods Beauty Queen." The song "Black Tears" was also on Jason Aldean's 2012 album Night Train. The duo's second EP is a five-song EP produced by Joey Moi on Big Loud and released on May 15, 2012. It starts off with "Cruise" and also includes "Get Your Shine On," "Tip It Back," "Tell Me How You Like It," and the title track "It'z Just What We Do".

The duo's first studio album, Here's to the Good Times, was an 11-song album produced by Joey Moi on Republic Nashville and released on December 4, 2012. The pair's first full-length, Here's to the Good Times, was the sixth-best-selling album of 2013 (topping Drake and Katy Perry, among others). "Cruise," the first single, reached number one on the Country Airplay chart dated December 15, 2012. The Jason Nevins - produced Top40 version of "Cruise" featuring Nelly later hit number four on the US Billboard Hot 100. In January 2014, "Cruise" became the best-selling country digital song of all time. The song spent a record 24 weeks at number one on Billboard's Hot Country Songs chart, which was the longest reign in the history of the chart until July 2017 when it was surpassed by Sam Hunt's "Body Like a Back Road."

The album's second single, "Get Your Shine On," was released to country radio on January 21, 2013, and reached number one on the Country Airplay chart in May 2013. It was co-written by the duo along with Rodney Clawson and Chris Tompkins. "Round Here" was released as the album's third single on June 3, 2013, and reached number one on the Country Airplay chart in September 2013. The album's fourth single, "Stay," was released in October 2013. It was co-written and originally recorded by Black Stone Cherry, produced by Joey Moi and the music video featured Josh Henderson. It reached number one on the Hot Country Songs chart and the Country Airplay chart in December 2013.

A deluxe edition of Here's to the Good Times titled Here's to the Good Times... This Is How We Roll was released on November 25, 2013. A music video for "It'z Just What We Do" premiered on December 13, 2013, with the video being uploaded to YouTube on December 26, 2013. "This Is How We Roll," a collaboration with Luke Bryan, was released from the deluxe edition as the album's fifth and final single on February 10, 2014, and reached number one on the Hot Country Songs chart in March 2014.

In early 2013, Florida Georgia Line toured the United States as part of the Dirt Road Diaries Tour with Thompson Square and headlining act Luke Bryan. In June 2013, the album reached number one on the Billboard Top Country Albums chart. It stayed at the top spot for ten weeks.

=== 2014–2017: Anything Goes and Dig Your Roots ===
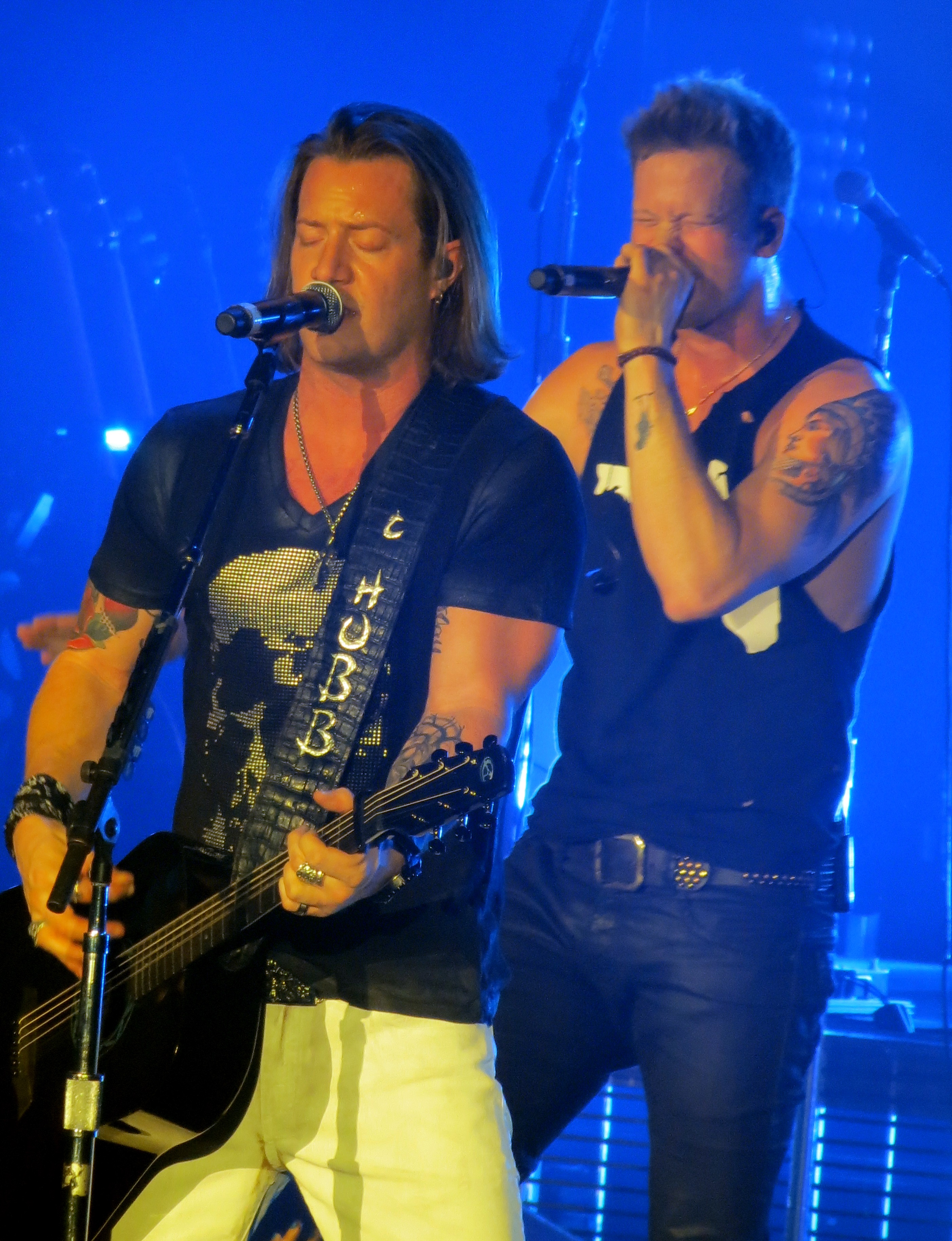
Florida Georgia Line on Jason Aldean's Night Train Tour, 2014

The duo revealed on August 15, 2014, that their second studio album would be titled Anything Goes with a release date of October 14, 2014. The album's first single, "Dirt," was released to country radio and digital sales outlets on July 8, 2014, and became the sixth consecutive single by Florida Georgia Line to make the top five on the Billboard Hot Country Songs chart. "Sun Daze" was released to digital sales outlets on September 16, 2014. A week later, the album's title track, "Anything Goes," was released on September 22, 2014. Florida Georgia Line also appeared on the Hot Tours recap. "Sippin' on Fire" was released on February 16, 2015 and "Confession" was released on November 3, 2015 as the album's final singles, and both reached number one on the Country Airplay chart.

In 2016, Florida Georgia Line became the only country artist to receive the Digital Diamond Award, for their single "Cruise" crossing the 10× Platinum threshold.

The duo released their third studio album, Dig Your Roots, on August 29, 2016, featuring Tim McGraw, Ziggy Marley, and the Backstreet Boys and started their Dig Your Roots tour, with Ryan Follesé, Chris Lane, and Dustin Lynch. They collaborated with Bebe Rexha on the song "Meant to Be" for her EP All Your Fault: Pt. 2; the song would become the duo's highest charting song on the Hot 100, at number 2. Along with Hank Williams Jr. and Jason Derulo, Florida Georgia Line sang "All My Rowdy Friends Are Here on Monday Night" as the theme for ESPN's Monday Night Football broadcasts in 2017.

=== 2018–present: Can't Say I Ain't Country, Life Rolls On, and Greatest Hits ===
The duo released "Simple" to country radio on June 1, 2018. Since then, they have released the preview tracks "Colorado", "Talk You Out of It," and "Sittin Pretty." "Talk You Out of It" was announced as the second single from the album, and was released to country radio on November 5, 2018. On December 11, 2018, the duo announced their fourth studio album, Can't Say I Ain't Country, which was released on February 15, 2019. On September 30, 2019, they won the Breakout Artist of the Decade award, along with Single of the Decade for their Diamond-certified 2012 hit "Cruise," and Music Event of the Decade for "Meant to Be," their 2017 collaboration with Bebe Rexha. On September 23, 2019, "Blessings" was released as the third single to country radio. On February 19, 2020, the duo featured on the country remix of Justin Bieber's single, "Yummy." The original song is the lead single of Bieber's fifth studio album, Changes, released five days before the remix.

On March 27, 2020, the duo released "I Love My Country," the debut single off their upcoming fifth album. The duo appeared on NBC's Songland, where they premiered the track "Second Guessing." On May 22, 2020, they released the 6-Pack EP. In June 2020, they were featured on Christian music singer Chris Tomlin's "Thank You Lord" with Thomas Rhett. The track was part of Tomlin's collaboration album Chris Tomlin & Friends, which included "Forever Home," another track they were featured on. Both members of the duo were co-executive producers of the album and co-writers on many of the tracks. In September 2020, the duo released the single "Long Live." They then released the single "Lil Bit," a collaboration with Nelly from his upcoming country-influenced album Heartland, a project the duo are co-executive producers on. They were also featured on long-time friend Chase Rice's single "Drinkin' Beer. Talkin' God. Amen." In December 2020, they announced their fifth studio album, Life Rolls On, which was released on February 12, 2021, and includes "Long Live," as well as all six songs from the 6-Pack EP.

In February 2022, Hubbard and Kelley announced that they would be "taking a break" from recording music together and would be on an indefinite hiatus from touring. Both members of the duo confirmed in 2024 that the reason for their breakup was due to Kelley wanting to start a solo career and, despite rumors to the contrary from fans, there was no animosity between the two at the time of their split. In November 2022, the duo released a greatest hits album.

On June 4, 2026, the duo made a surprise appearance and performed together at CMA Fest in Nashville, Tennessee and confirmed their reunion.

== Other ventures ==
The duo has a brand of whiskey, Old Camp Whiskey, promoted in their song "Smooth" and in their feature on Morgan Wallen's single "Up Down". The two men launched Round Here Records in 2019, an independent label with Canaan Smith signed as the flagship artist.

== Discography ==
Studio albums

- Here's to the Good Times (2012)
- Anything Goes (2014)
- Dig Your Roots (2016)
- Can't Say I Ain't Country (2019)
- Life Rolls On (2021)

== Tours ==
Headlining

- Here's to the Good Times Tour (2013–2014)
- Anything Goes Tour (2015)
- Dig Your Roots Tour (2016)
- Smooth Tour (2017)
- Can't Say I Ain't Country Tour (2019)

Supporting

- The Summer Never Ends Tour (2012) with Jake Owen
- Dirt Road Diaries Tour (2013) with Luke Bryan
- The Red Tour (2013) with Taylor Swift (12 shows)
- Burn It Down Tour (2014) with Jason Aldean
- Kick the Dust Up Tour (2015) with Luke Bryan (stadium dates only)
- Chillaxification Tour (2020) with Kenny Chesney (stadium dates only)

== Awards and nominations ==
Year	Association	Category	Nominated work / recipient	Result	Ref
2013	Academy of Country Music Awards	New Artist of the Year	Florida Georgia Line	Won	
2013	Academy of Country Music Awards	New Vocal Duo or Group of the Year	Florida Georgia Line	Won	
2013	Academy of Country Music Awards	Vocal Duo of the Year	Florida Georgia Line	Nominated	
2013	Billboard Music Awards	Top Country Song	"Cruise"	Nominated	
2013	CMT Music Awards	Video of the Year	"Cruise"	Nominated	
2013	CMT Music Awards	Duo Video of the Year	"Cruise"	Won	
2013	CMT Music Awards	Breakthrough Video of the Year	"Cruise"	Won	
2013	CMT Music Awards	Nationwide On Your Side Award	Florida Georgia Line	Nominated	
2013	Teen Choice Awards	Choice Country Group	Florida Georgia Line	Nominated	
2013	Teen Choice Awards	Choice Country Song	"Cruise"	Nominated	
2013	Teen Choice Awards	Choice Summer Song	"Cruise (Remix)" (with Nelly)	Nominated	
2013	Teen Choice Awards	Choice Summer Music Star: Group	Florida Georgia Line	Nominated	
2013	CMA Awards	New Artist of the Year	Florida Georgia Line	Nominated	
2013	CMA Awards	Vocal Duo of the Year	Florida Georgia Line	Won	
2013	CMA Awards	Single of the Year	"Cruise"	Won	
2013	CMA Awards	Vocal Event of the Year	"Cruise (Remix)" (with Nelly)	Nominated	
2013	American Music Awards	New Artist of the Year	Florida Georgia Line	Nominated	
2013	American Music Awards	Favorite Country Band/Duo/Group	Florida Georgia Line	Nominated	
2013	American Music Awards	Favorite Country Album	Here's to the Good Times	Nominated	
2013	American Music Awards	Single of the Year	"Cruise (Remix)" (with Nelly)	Won	
2014	Billboard Music Awards	Top Duo/Group	Florida Georgia Line	Nominated	
2014	Billboard Music Awards	Top Country Artist	Florida Georgia Line	Nominated	
2014	Billboard Music Awards	Top Country Song	"Cruise"	Won	
2014	Billboard Music Awards	Top Country Album	Here's to the Good Times	Nominated	
2014	CMT Music Awards	Video of the Year	"This Is How We Roll" (with Luke Bryan)	Nominated	
2014	CMT Music Awards	Duo Video of the Year	"Round Here"	Won	
2014	CMT Music Awards	Duo Video of the Year	"Stay"	Nominated	
2014	CMT Music Awards	Collaborative Video of the Year	"This Is How We Roll" (with Luke Bryan)	Won	
2014	Teen Choice Awards	Choice Country Group	Florida Georgia Line	Nominated	
2014	Teen Choice Awards	Choice Country Song	"This Is How We Roll" (with Luke Bryan)	Won	
2014	Canadian Country Music Association	Top Selling Album	Here's to the Good Times	Won	
2014	CMA Awards	Vocal Duo of the Year	Florida Georgia Line	Won	
2014	American Music Awards	Favorite Country Band/Duo/Group	Florida Georgia Line	Won	
2015	People's Choice Awards	Favorite Country Group	Florida Georgia Line	Nominated	
2015	ACM Awards	Entertainer of the Year	Florida Georgia Line	Nominated	
2015	ACM Awards	Vocal Duo of the Year	Florida Georgia Line	Won	
2015	ACM Awards	Single Record of the Year	"Dirt"	Nominated	
2015	ACM Awards	Vocal Event of the Year	"The South" (with The Cadillac Three, Dierks Bentley, and Mike Eli)	Nominated	
2015	ACM Awards	Vocal Event of the Year	"This Is How We Roll" (with Luke Bryan)	Won	
2015	Billboard Music Awards	Top Duo/Group	Florida Georgia Line	Nominated	
2015	Billboard Music Awards	Top Country Artist	Florida Georgia Line	Won	
2015	Billboard Music Awards	Top Country Song	"This Is How We Roll" (with Luke Bryan)	Nominated	
2015	Teen Choice Awards	Choice Country Artist	Florida Georgia Line	Nominated	
2015	Teen Choice Awards	Choice Country Song	"Sippin' On Fire"	Nominated	
2015	CMA Awards	Vocal Duo of the Year	Florida Georgia Line	Won	
2015	American Music Awards	Favorite Country Band/Duo/Group	Florida Georgia Line	Won	
2015	American Music Awards	Favorite Country Album	Anything Goes	Won	
2016	People's Choice Awards	Favorite Country Group	Florida Georgia Line	Nominated	
2016	ACM Awards	Vocal Duo of the Year	Florida Georgia Line	Won	
2016	American Country Countdown Awards	Artist of the Year	Florida Georgia Line	Nominated	
2016	American Country Countdown Awards	Duo of the Year	Florida Georgia Line	Won	
2016	American Country Countdown Awards	Digital Album of the Year	Florida Georgia Line	Nominated	
2016	CMT Music Awards	Video of the Year	"Sippin' on Fire"	Nominated	
2016	CMT Music Awards	Group/Duo Video of the Year	"Sippin' on Fire"	Nominated	
2016	Teen Choice Awards	Choice Music - Country Song	"H.O.L.Y."	Nominated	
2016	American Music Awards	Favorite Country Song	"H.O.L.Y."	Nominated	
2016	American Music Awards	Favorite Country Duo or Group	Florida Georgia Line	Won	
2017	People's Choice Awards	Favorite Country Group	Florida Georgia Line	Nominated	
2017	iHeartRadio Music Awards	Best Duo/Group of the Year	Florida Georgia Line	Nominated	
2017	ACM Awards	Single Record of the Year	"H.O.L.Y."	Won	
2017	ACM Awards	Vocal Event of the year	"May We All" (with Tim McGraw)	Won	
2017	ACM Awards	Vocal Duo of the Year	Florida Georgia Line	Nominated	
2017	ACM Awards	Entertainer of the Year	Florida Georgia Line	Nominated	
2017	ACM Awards	Album of the Year	Dig Your Roots	Nominated	
2017	Radio Disney Music Awards	Country Favorite Artist	Florida Georgia Line	Nominated	
2017	Radio Disney Music Awards	Country Favorite Song	"H.O.L.Y."	Nominated	
2017	Billboard Music Awards	Top Duo/Group	Florida Georgia Line	Nominated	
2017	Billboard Music Awards	Top Country Artist	Florida Georgia Line	Nominated	
2017	Billboard Music Awards	Top Country Album	Dig Your Roots	Nominated	
2017	Billboard Music Awards	Top Country Song	"H.O.L.Y."	Won	
2017	Billboard Music Awards	Top Country Song	"May We All" (with Tim McGraw)	Nominated	
2017	Billboard Music Awards	Top Country Collaboration	"May We All" (with Tim McGraw)	Nominated	
2017	CMT Music Awards	Video of the Year	"H.O.L.Y."	Nominated	
2017	CMT Music Awards	Duo Video of the Year	"H.O.L.Y."	Won	
2017	CMT Music Awards	Collaborative Video of the Year	"May We All" (with Tim McGraw)	Nominated	
2017	Teen Choice Awards	Choice Country Artist	Florida Georgia Line	Nominated	
2017	Teen Choice Awards	Choice Collaboration	"God, Your Mama, And Me" (with Backstreet Boys)	Nominated	
2017	Teen Choice Awards	Choice Country Song	"God, Your Mama, And Me" (with Backstreet Boys)	Nominated	
2017	Teen Choice Awards	Choice Summer Group	Florida Georgia Line	Nominated	
2017	Country Music Association Awards	Vocal Duo of the Year	Florida Georgia Line	Nominated	
2017	American Music Awards	Favorite Country Duo or Group	Florida Georgia Line	Nominated	
2018	Billboard Music Awards	Top Country Duo/Group Artist	Florida Georgia Line	Won	
2018	Billboard Music Awards	Top Country Tour	Florida Georgia Line	Nominated	
2018	Billboard Music Awards	Top Country Song	"Meant To Be" (with Bebe Rexha)	Nominated	
2018	CMT Music Awards	CMT Performance of the Year	"Everybody" (with Backstreet Boys)	Won	
2018	CMT Music Awards	Collaborative Video of the Year	"Meant to Be" (with Bebe Rexha)	Nominated	
2018	CMT Music Awards	Duo Video of the Year	"Smooth"	Nominated	
2018	Teen Choice Awards	Choice Country Song	"Meant to Be" (with Bebe Rexha)	Won	
2018	Teen Choice Awards	Choice Country Artist	Florida Georgia Line	Nominated	
2018	American Music Awards	Favorite Duo or Group - Country	Florida Georgia Line	Won	
2018	American Music Awards	Favorite Song - Country	"Meant to Be" (with Bebe Rexha)	Nominated	
2018	American Music Awards	Collaboration of the Year	"Meant to Be" (with Bebe Rexha)	Nominated	
2018	MTV Video Music Awards	Best Collaboration	"Meant to Be" (with Bebe Rexha)	Nominated	
2018	iHeartRadio Titanium Award	1 Billion Total Audience Spins on iHeartRadio Stations	"Meant to Be" (with Bebe Rexha)	Won	
2019	Grammy Awards	Best Country Duo/Group Performance	"Meant to Be" (with Bebe Rexha)	Nominated	
2019	iHeartRadioMusic Awards	Country Song of the Year	"Meant to Be" (with Bebe Rexha)	Won	
2019	iHeartRadioMusic Awards	Best Collaboration	"Meant to Be" (with Bebe Rexha)	Nominated	
2019	Billboard Music Awards	Top Country Artist	Florida Georgia Line	Nominated	
2019	Billboard Music Awards	Top Country Duo/Group	Florida Georgia Line	Nominated	
2019	Billboard Music Awards	Top Country Song	"Meant to Be" (with Bebe Rexha)	Won	
2019	Billboard Music Awards	Top Radio Song	"Meant to Be" (with Bebe Rexha)	Nominated	
2019	CMT Music Awards	Duo Video of the Year	"Simple"	Nominated	

== Television appearances ==
Year	Title	Role	Notes
2014	American Country Countdown Awards	Themselves/Host	
2016	Hollywood Game Night	Themselves	Episode: "Musical Game Night" (with Ciara, Estelle, & Hunter Hayes)
2017, 2021	CMT Crossroads	Themselves	Alongside with Backstreet Boys (2017) and Nelly (2021)
2017	The Ellen Show	Performance	Alongside with Backstreet Boys
2019	Ridiculousness	Themselves/Guest	Episode: "Florida Georgia Line"
2020	Songland	Themselves/Guest	Episode: "Florida Georgia Line"
