= Sippin' on Fire =

Single by Florida Georgia Line

from the album Anything Goes
- Released: February 16, 2015
- Recorded: 2014
- Genre: Country
- Length: 3:14
- Label: Republic Nashville
- Songwriters: Rodney Clawson; Matt Dragstrem; Cole Taylor
- Producer: Joey Moi

Florida Georgia Line singles chronology
"Sun Daze" (2014)	"Sippin' on Fire" (2015)	"Anything Goes" (2015)

Music videos
- "Sippin' On Fire" on YouTube
- "Sippin' On Fire (Lyric Video)" on YouTube

"Sippin' on Fire" is a song written by Cole Taylor, Matt Dragstrem and Rodney Clawson, and recorded by American country music duo Florida Georgia Line. It is the third single from their second studio album, Anything Goes.

== Critical reception ==
Website Taste of Country reviewed the single favorably, saying that "After pushing the edges of their sound with “Dirt” and “Sun Daze,” Hubbard, Brian Kelley and Moi return home with “Sippin’ on Fire,” the third single from Anything Goes. It’s a song that could have found its way on to Here’s to the Good Times."

== Commercial performance ==
The song has sold 513,000 copies in the US as of July 2015. It was certified Platinum by the RIAA on January 29, 2016.

== Music video ==
The music video was directed by Marc Klasfeld and premiered in March 2015. It features the duo and a full band performing the song from within a ring of fire in the Mojave Desert, and scenes of a man and woman walking towards each other from afar, eventually meeting at night and caressing around the ring of fire. Their images "melt away" in the fire as the video goes on.

== Charts and certifications ==
Chart (2015)	Peak position
Canada Hot 100 (Billboard)	36
Canada Country (Billboard)	1
US Billboard Hot 100	40
US Hot Country Songs (Billboard)	3
US Country Airplay (Billboard)	1

=== Year-end charts ===
Chart (2015)	Position
US Country Airplay (Billboard)	48
US Hot Country Songs (Billboard)	21

=== Certifications ===
Region	Certification	Certified units/sales
United States (RIAA)	Platinum	1,000,000^{‡}
^{‡} Sales+streaming figures based on certification alone.
