= Sun Daze =

Single by Florida Georgia Line

from the album Anything Goes
- Released: September 16, 2014
- Recorded: 2014
- Genre: Country pop; reggae
- Length: 3:04
- Label: Republic Nashville
- Songwriters: Tyler Hubbard; Brian Kelley; Cary Barlowe; Jesse Frasure; Sarah Buxton
- Producer: Joey Moi

Florida Georgia Line singles chronology
"Dirt" (2014)	"Sun Daze" (2014)	"Sippin' on Fire" (2015)

Music videos
- "Sun Daze" on YouTube
- "Sun Daze (Lyric Video)" on YouTube

"Sun Daze" is a song recorded by American country music duo Florida Georgia Line. It is the second single from their second studio album, Anything Goes, which was released on October 14, 2014. The song was written by the duo's members Tyler Hubbard and Brian Kelley, along with Sarah Buxton, Cary Barlowe and Jesse Frasure.

== History and content ==
Thematically, the song is about a man who plans to participate in various recreational activities, including flip cup, sexual intercourse, and substance intoxication of cannabis. Country Weekly describes the song as "reggae-indebted" and said that "While it retains the party friendly vibe of much of FGL's work, the loose, stripped-down production is a bit of a departure for the duo". The group members told the magazine that “It still kinda bumps and it's still got a cool guitar line and it's got the whistles going and it's still groovy. You can't not shake your head to that song. It's just a simple song, man. We just try to be very transparent in the way we write and the way we live. There's nothing better than just kicking back . . . whatever 'Sun Daze' is for that person—staying home, making a drink, playing basketball, whatever it may be.”

In an article for The Washington Post, Emily Yahr cited the presence of the term "getting laid" and the double entendre lyric "I'll sit you up on a kitchen sink / Stick a pink umbrella in your drink" as examples of increasingly prominent sexual content in country music in the 2010s.

== Critical reception ==
The song received mixed to negative reviews from several critics. Hannah Smith for Vinyl Mag says "this song [is] incredibly catchy in the worst way. There's nothing wrong with party songs, but there comes a time when an artist needs to evaluate the direction their career is heading. No one wants to hear middle-aged people singing about getting laid and stoned, which this song addresses multiple times." Kevin John Coyne of Country Universe similarly panned the song, giving it a failing grade and writing "listening to “Sun Daze”, I kept thinking back to those parody music videos that used to pop up on In Living Color and MadTV. A comedy writer couldn't mock Florida Georgia Line better than they're mocking themselves here." Time listed it as one of the worst songs of 2014, writing that the song "sounds like what would happen if Florida Georgia Line made a disastrous attempt at writing a song for Miley Cyrus (and then recorded it after Cyrus rejected it for being even too low brow for her)" and that "“I sit you up on a kitchen sink / stick the pink umbrella in your drink” wins the I Just Threw Up in My Mouth Award for worst innuendo of 2014."

Jen Swirsky of Country Music Chat gave the song a more positive review, writing "Love it or hate it, 'Sun Daze' is witty. Perhaps witty on subjects that may still be a little too liberal for country music, but witty nonetheless." Country Weekly reviewer Tammy Ragusa was more moderate, praising the reggae influences of the instrumentation while criticizing the lyrical content. She said that "their continued attempts to establish themselves as bad boys, gratuitously dropping in overt references to getting 'laid' and 'stoned', are beginning to sound more cartoonish." She also wrote that "This is the kind of thing that sells and garners airplay, and 'Sun Daze' will do well for FGL", ultimately grading the song "C+".

== Commercial performance ==
The single has been a commercial success for the duo, peaking at No. 3 on the Billboard Hot Country Songs chart and No. 1 on the Country Airplay chart. The song was certified gold by the RIAA on January 29, 2015, and platinum on September 15, 2015. As of April 2015, the single has sold 618,000 copies in the United States.

== Music video ==
The music video was directed by Marc Klasfeld and premiered in October 2014. Footage from the 2014 installment of WWE Night of Champions is shown in the video, an event which Florida Georgia Line served as guest commentators for as a means of cross-promotion.

== Charts and certifications ==
=== Weekly charts ===
Chart (2014–2015)	Peak position
Canada Hot 100 (Billboard)	41
Canada Country (Billboard)	2
US Billboard Hot 100	44
US Hot Country Songs (Billboard)	3
US Country Airplay (Billboard)	1

=== Year-end charts ===
Chart (2014)	Position
US Hot Country Songs (Billboard)	93

Chart (2015)	Position
US Country Airplay (Billboard)	35
US Hot Country Songs (Billboard)	35

=== Certifications ===
Region	Certification	Certified units/sales
United States (RIAA)	Platinum	618,000
