= Anything Goes (Florida Georgia Line song) =

Single by Florida Georgia Line

from the album Anything Goes
- Released: June 15, 2015
- Genre: Country
- Length: 3:39
- Label: Republic Nashville
- Songwriters: Felix McTeigue; Chris Tompkins; Craig Wiseman
- Producer: Joey Moi

Florida Georgia Line singles chronology
"Sippin' on Fire" (2015)	"Anything Goes" (2015)	"Confession" (2015)

Music videos
- "Anything Goes" on YouTube
- "Anything Goes (Lyric Video)" on YouTube

"Anything Goes" is a song recorded by American country music duo Florida Georgia Line. It was released to radio on June 15, 2015 as the fourth single from their second studio album, Anything Goes. The song was written by Felix McTeigue, Chris Tompkins and Craig Wiseman.

== Critical reception ==
Billy Dukes of Taste of Country reviewed the single favorably, saying that "By freeing themselves of the shackles of what is or isn't 'real' country music, this duo is able to fall into rhymes and metaphors that set their sound apart as much as their in-your-face production style...Sonically, the song is very similar to many (but not all) of FGL's previous hits...a closer listen reveals an incredibly refined sonic landscape."

== Commercial performance ==
The song first entered the Billboard Country Airplay at number 50 on chart dated June 27, 2015, and peaked at number 3 on the chart on October 31, 2015. The song also peaked at number 6 on the Hot Country Songs chart, making it the duo's first single to not reach number one on either chart, although it did reach number one on the Canadian Country Chart. The song has sold 430,000 copies in the US as of November 2015. It was certified Platinum by the RIAA on September 23, 2016.

== Music video ==
The music video was directed by Shaun Silva and premiered in June 2015. It consists entirely of footage from the duo's 2015 Anything Goes tour, their first as a headliner.

== Charts ==
Chart (2015)	Peak position
Canada Hot 100 (Billboard)	51
Canada Country (Billboard)	1
US Billboard Hot 100	55
US Hot Country Songs (Billboard)	6
US Country Airplay (Billboard)	3

=== Year-end charts ===
Chart (2015)	Position
US Country Airplay (Billboard)	24
US Hot Country Songs (Billboard)	38

== Certifications ==
Region	Certification	Certified units/sales
United States (RIAA)	2× Platinum	430,000
