= Dirt (Florida Georgia Line song) =

Single by Florida Georgia Line

from the album Anything Goes
- Released: July 8, 2014
- Genre: Country
- Length: 3:50 (album version); 3:38 (radio edit)
- Label: Republic Nashville
- Songwriters: Rodney Clawson; Chris Tompkins
- Producer: Joey Moi

Florida Georgia Line singles chronology
"This Is How We Roll" (2014)	"Dirt" (2014)	"Sun Daze" (2014)

Music video
- "Dirt" on YouTube

Lyric video
- "Dirt" on YouTube

"Dirt" is a song recorded by American country music duo Florida Georgia Line. It is the first single from their second studio album, Anything Goes, which was released on October 14, 2014.

== Content ==
Written by Rodney Clawson and Chris Tompkins, the song is a mid-tempo ballad about various life events centering on dirt. The final lines of the song include the lyrics "You know you came from it / Someday you'll return to it", which the duo initially did not want to include as they felt it was a cliché. However they eventually decided to include the line. Brian Kelley, one-half of the duo, told the Chicago Sun-Times, "I think a 'Cruise'-type song would have been accepted, but just when you think you have FGL figured out, we wanted to go against the grain and change it up with a song like 'Dirt'".

== Music video ==
The music video was directed by Nigel Dick. It follows the life of a married couple, alternating between the past and present, where the family is gathered for the mother's funeral. The video has a lot of visual references to dirt. Dirt is portrayed as a substance that you can smear in the face of your loved ones one minute, then bury family in it the next. It stars JD Souther in the leading role and Lindsay Heyser as the young Rosie.

== Commercial performance ==
"Dirt" debuted at number 16 on the Country Airplay chart for the week of July 26, 2014, becoming the highest-airplay debut by a country duo. "Dirt" also debuted on the US Billboard Hot 100 at number 11 and on the Canadian Hot 100 the same week at number 10, being the "Hot Shot Debut" of the week on both charts. Also during the same week, "Dirt" jumped from number 40 to number one on the Billboard Hot Country Songs chart. On its final week on the chart, for the week of January 10, 2015, the song jumped from number 22 to number 11 on the Hot Country Songs chart and was the airplay garner for the week. Afterwards, however, the song dropped off the charts.

"Dirt" is the sixth consecutive single of the duo to peak in the top 5 on the Billboard Hot Country Songs chart. The song reached its million sales mark in the US in October 2014. As of December 2014, the song has sold 1,272,000 copies in the US. The song was certified double Platinum on April 30, 2015.

In Canada, the song sold 17,000 downloads in its debut week.

== Chart positions ==
Chart (2014–2015)	Peak position
Canada Hot 100 (Billboard)	10
Canada Country (Billboard)	1
Czech Republic Singles Digital (ČNS IFPI)	95
Slovakia Singles Digital (ČNS IFPI)	81
US Billboard Hot 100	11
US Hot Country Songs (Billboard)	1
US Country Airplay (Billboard)	1

=== Year-end charts ===
Chart (2014)	Position
Canada Canadian Hot 100	80
US Billboard Hot 100	66
US Country Airplay (Billboard)	6
US Hot Country Songs (Billboard)	3

Chart (2015)	Position
US Hot Country Songs (Billboard)	95

== Certifications ==
Region	Certification	Certified units/sales
United States (RIAA)	2× Platinum	2,000,000^{‡}
^{‡} Sales+streaming figures based on certification alone.
