= Get Your Shine On (Florida Georgia Line song) =

Single by Florida Georgia Line

from the album Here's to the Good Times
- Released: January 21, 2013
- Recorded: 2012
- Genre: Country
- Length: 3:42
- Label: Republic Nashville
- Songwriters: Tyler Hubbard; Brian Kelley; Rodney Clawson; Chris Tompkins
- Producer: Joey Moi

Florida Georgia Line singles chronology
"Cruise" (2012)	"Get Your Shine On" (2013)	"Round Here" (2013)

Audio sample
- file; help

Music Videos
- "Get Your Shine On" on YouTube
- "Get Your Shine On (Lyric Video)" on YouTube

"Get Your Shine On" is a song recorded by American country music duo Florida Georgia Line. It was released in January 2013 as the second single from their album Here's to the Good Times. The song was written by group members Brian Kelley and Tyler Hubbard with Rodney Clawson and Chris Tompkins.

== Critical reception ==
Billy Dukes of Taste of Country gave the song three and a half stars out of five, writing that the song "cements the duo as the good-time country party band they introduced themselves as" and "[relies] on a big, fat hook and songwriting that’s sharper than they’ll get credit for." Matt Bjorke of Roughstock gave the song four stars out of five, saying that "Joey Moi's thick muscular production adds a layer of rock/country sheen that could be too much for some but […] makes total sense and fits." Dan Milliken of Country Universe gave the song a C grade, criticizing the production and saying that the duo "desperately need to aim higher than soundtracking tailgate parties", but adding that "if you can endure this thing long enough to pay attention to the lyrics, you’ll see that they’ve got a sharp way with details to go along with their strong melodic sense."

== Music video ==
The music video was directed by Declan Whitebloom and premiered in February 2013. It was shot in Cancún, Mexico and features various scenes from the Hard Rock Hotel Cancun.

== Chart performance ==
"Get Your Shine On" debuted at number 47 on the U.S. Billboard Hot Country Songs chart for the week of October 20, 2012, sixteen weeks prior to its release as a single. It also debuted at number 52 on the U.S. Billboard Country Airplay chart for the week of December 22, 2012, due to unsolicited airplay seven weeks before being released to radio. It also debuted at number 96 on the U.S. Billboard Hot 100 chart for the week of February 9, 2013 and number 91 on the Canadian Hot 100 chart for the week of February 16, 2013. In May 2013, it became the duo's second consecutive number 1 single, making them the first artist to reach the top of the country charts with their first two singles since Easton Corbin in April–October 2010, and the first duo to do so since Brooks & Dunn in September–December 1991. The song has reached 1 million copies in sales in the United States by May 2013. As of April 2014, the song has sold 1,671,000 copies in the US. The song was certified triple Platinum by the RIAA for combined streams and sales on December 12, 2018.

== Charts and certifications ==
=== Weekly charts ===
Weekly chart performance for "Get Your Shine On"
Chart (2013)	Peak position
Canada Hot 100 (Billboard)	39
Canada Country (Billboard)	1
US Billboard Hot 100	27
US Country Airplay (Billboard)	1
US Hot Country Songs (Billboard)	5

=== Certifications ===
Certifications and sales for "Get Your Shine On"
Region	Certification	Certified units/sales
United States (RIAA)	3× Platinum	1,671,000

=== Year-end charts ===
2013 year-end chart performance for "Get Your Shine On"
Chart (2013)	Position
US Billboard Hot 100	94
US Country Airplay (Billboard)	22
US Hot Country Songs (Billboard)	7
