= Round Here (Florida Georgia Line song) =

Single by Florida Georgia Line

from the album Here's to the Good Times
- Released: June 3, 2013
- Recorded: 2012
- Genre: Country
- Length: 3:35
- Label: Republic Nashville
- Songwriter(s): Rodney Clawson; Chris Tompkins; Thomas Rhett
- Producer(s): Joey Moi

Florida Georgia Line singles chronology
"Get Your Shine On" (2013)	"Round Here" (2013)	"Stay" (2013)

Music video
- "Round Here" on YouTube

"Round Here" is a song recorded by American country music duo Florida Georgia Line. It was released in June 2013 as the third single from their album Here's to the Good Times. It was written by Rodney Clawson, Chris Tompkins, and Thomas Rhett.

== Composition ==
According to the sheet music published at musicnotes.com, the song is written in the key of D-flat major.

== Music video ==
The music video was directed by Peter Zavadil and premiered in June 2013. It was filmed in the duo's hometowns, Ormond Beach, Florida and Monroe, Georgia.

== Commercial performance ==
"Round Here" debuted at number 54 on the U.S. Billboard Country Airplay chart for the week of June 1, 2013. It debuted at number 36 on the U.S. Billboard Hot Country Songs chart for the week of December 22, 2012. It also debuted at number 89 on the U.S. Billboard Hot 100 and number 90 on the Canadian Hot 100 for the week of June 29, 2013. As of April 2014, the song has sold 1,143,000 copies in the US. The song was certified double Platinum by the RIAA in 2015 and triple Platinum in 2019.

The song became the duo's third consecutive number 1 on the Country Airplay chart dated for September 21, 2013, thus making Florida Georgia Line only the second duo after Brooks & Dunn to send its first three singles to number 1 on that chart. During its first week at the top of the charts, the Top 10 of Country Airplay included five songs co-written by Thomas Rhett or his father, Rhett Akins, one of which was the former's own "It Goes Like This". The duo performed the song on the November 18th, 2013 episode of WWE Raw.

== Charts and certifications ==
=== Weekly chart ===
Chart (2013)	Peak position
Canada (Canadian Hot 100)	47
Canada Country (Billboard)	1
US Billboard Hot 100	28
US Country Airplay (Billboard)	1
US Hot Country Songs (Billboard)	3

=== Year-end charts ===
Chart (2013)	Position
US Country Airplay (Billboard)	18
US Hot Country Songs (Billboard)	16

=== Certifications ===
Region	Certification	Certified units/sales
United States (RIAA)	3× Platinum	3,000,000^{‡}
^{‡} Sales+streaming figures based on certification alone.
