= Cruise (song) =

Single by Florida Georgia Line

from the album Here's to the Good Times
- Released: August 6, 2012
- Recorded: December 2011
- Genre: Country (original); country rap (remix); country pop (remix)
- Length: 3:29 (album version); 3:26 (remix featuring Nelly); 3:07 (remix radio edit)
- Label: Big Loud Mountain; Republic Nashville
- Songwriters: Brian Kelley; Tyler Hubbard; Joey Moi; Chase Rice; Jesse Rice
- Producers: Joey Moi; Jason Nevins (remix featuring Nelly)

Florida Georgia Line singles chronology
| "Cruise" (2012) | "Get Your Shine On" (2013) |

Nelly singles chronology
| "Hey Porsche" (2013) | "Cruise (Remix)" (2013) | "Get Like Me" (2013) |

Audio sample
- file; help

"Cruise" (Remix)
- Cover for remix featuring Nelly.

Music video
- "Cruise" on YouTube

"Cruise" is a song recorded by American country music duo Florida Georgia Line. It was first released to iTunes in April 2012 and then to radio on August 6, 2012 as the first single from their extended play It'z Just What We Do. It was written by group members Brian Kelley and Tyler Hubbard with Joey Moi, Chase Rice, and Jesse Rice (no relation). It is included on their first album for Republic Nashville, Here's to the Good Times, released on December 4. "Cruise" is the best-selling country digital song of all time in the United States as of January 2014. The song is considered the foremost example of the genre of country music termed "bro-country".

The recording by Florida Georgia Line reached No. 16 on the Billboard Hot 100 on its initial release, but dropped off the Hot 100 in February 2013. A couple of months later, a remix by rapper Nelly was released, and the song then re-entered the top 10. The song reached a peak of No. 4 on the Hot 100 chart in its 34th week, one of the slowest climbs to the top five in the chart's history. The song also logged 24 weeks at No. 1 on Hot Country Songs, becoming the longest-running No. 1 single on that chart at the time, until it was surpassed in 2017 by Sam Hunt's "Body Like a Back Road".

The Nelly remix, produced by Jason Nevins, was released to iTunes on April 2, 2013, and to pop radio on April 16 of that same year. The remix was played at the end of Nelly's music video for "Hey Porsche", and it was included on the deluxe version of Florida Georgia Line's album, This Is How We Roll. In total, all versions of the songs have sold over 7 million copies in the US.

== Background ==
The song was written by the two members of Florida Georgia Line, Brian Kelley and Tyler Hubbard, together with Joey Moi, Chase Rice and Jesse Rice. According to Chase Rice, they (Brian Kelley, Chase Rice and Jesse Rice) were writing a different song, when Kelley started to strum a chord and hummed another melody, which ended up being the melody for "Cruise". They decided to drop the song they were writing to write "Cruise" instead, which they finished in 45 minutes. Kelley originally wrote the opening line as "Baby, you like a song", and the song then went through several edits when Florida Georgia Line recorded the song with producer Moi, with rewrites of some lyrics and the addition of a section after the solo. In December 2011, the duo signed a publishing deal with Big Loud Shirt, and recorded "Cruise" that same day.

The song is a mid-tempo in the key of B-flat major with a main chord pattern of B♭-F-Gm^{7}-E♭. It is about an attractive woman that the male narrator wants to cruise with in his pick-up truck.

== Critical reception ==
Billy Dukes of Taste of Country gave the song four stars out of five, writing that "their formal training shows in the tight execution of this lyric-heavy summer song." Matt Bjorke of Roughstock also gave the song a favorable review, calling it "a feel-good song from a band that likes to have a good time." Liv Carter of Urban Country News gave the song a thumbs-up, calling it "one of those disposable-yet-enjoyable country summer songs which will not only enjoy a healthy chart run, but find itself on radio playlists for many more summers." Ian Crouch wrote in The New Yorker that musically, the song is "forward-thinking, combining traditional country harmonies and a banjo backing with rock and roll stadium-show guitars and drums", and "has the hint of a dance-music". However, lyrically, he thought that the song is "ass-backwards".

"Cruise" is credited with the rise of "bro-country", a musical trend in country music starting in 2013 that entails rock- and rap-influenced country by male artists, often with partying themes. Jody Rosen, a music critic who coined the term bro-country, described "Cruise" as the "most generic song", an "amiable lunk of a song", and that the "most extraordinary thing about it is its aggressive ordinariness." To Rosen, it exemplifies the genre of bro-country, "music by and of the tatted, gym-toned, party-hearty young American white dude." Its themes of women and driving are noted by critics to be typical of the genre of bro-country, with its perceived objectification of women the target of criticism. Some country purists also thought it too influenced by hip-hop, pop and rock to be country music, with one describing the song as "the death of modern country music".

== Music video ==
The music video was directed by Brian Lazzaro and premiered in August 2012. It was filmed outside Nashville, and featured the duo driving and performing against an American flag backdrop at a colorful paint party, and showed shots of women as well as a game of strip poker. In the remix, it features the duo, Nelly, and another friend of theirs, driving down a road. It shows shots of women in country, cowgirl outfits and police uniforms on vehicles and riding with the men in the men's cars as they go down the country roads.

== Chart performance ==
"Cruise" debuted at No. 54 on the U.S. Billboard Hot Country Songs chart for the week of August 11, 2012. On the chart dated December 15, 2012, it reached No. 1 on the U.S. Billboard Country Airplay chart in only its 19th week, achieving the fastest climb to the top of the chart for a debut single since Heartland's "I Loved Her First" in October 2006.

"Cruise" went on to spend three weeks atop the Country Airplay chart—the most weeks at No. 1 on Country Airplay for a new act's first charted title since Gretchen Wilson's "Redneck Woman" in early 2004—and 24 weeks (over three different runs including the Nelly remix) atop the new Hot Country Songs chart. When the song reached its tenth week atop Hot Country Songs on May 18, 2013, it became the second song (Taylor Swift's "We Are Never Ever Getting Back Together") to spend that many weeks at No. 1 since Buck Owens's "Love's Gonna Live Here" (16 weeks between October 1963 and February 1964). On August 24, 2013, it logged its 24th week at No. 1, the longest run at No. 1 in the chart's 69-year history (the previous record was 21 weeks held jointly by three songs, the last of which was Webb Pierce's "In the Jailhouse Now" from February to June 1955). On November 9, 2013, the song logged its 66th and final week on the Hot Country Songs chart, setting a new all-time record of 56 weeks, previously held jointly by "Love Like Crazy" by Lee Brice and "Wanted" by Hunter Hayes, and just the sixth song to spend 52 or more weeks on the chart during a single chart run.

"Cruise" debuted at No. 99 on the U.S. Billboard Hot 100 chart for the week of September 1, 2012. It spent 26 consecutive weeks on it, peaking at No. 16. The song returned to the Hot 100 following the release of the Jason Nevins produced remix with Nelly, reappearing at No. 8 for the week ending April 20, 2013, and reaching a new peak at No. 4 in the issue dated July 6, 2013. The remix video featuring Nelly has over 91 million views as of November 2018. According to Nielsen SoundScan, the Nelly version of "Cruise" has sold 2.5 million copies as of January 2014. The song reached a peak of No. 4 on the Billboard Hot 100 chart on July 6, 2013, and set an industry record for the slowest climb to the top five in the chart's nearly 55-year history, eclipsing the 30-week ascent of Lonestar's No. 1 "Amazed" in 1999–2000. However, the record was soon broken by Imagine Dragons' "Radioactive", which peaked in its 43rd week.

The song became the best-selling song by a country duo in digital history by April 2013, and it also became the fourth-selling song of 2013 with 4,691,000 downloads sold for the year. By October 2013, the song has sold 6 million copies in the United States, then the second best-selling country song in history, behind Lady Antebellum's "Need You Now". In January 2014, it overtook Lady Antebellum's "Need You Now" and became the best-selling country song in the US. It was certified 9× Platinum by RIAA on January 29, 2015 (certification includes streaming in addition to downloads since May 2013). The song, including all versions, reached seven million in total sales in September 2014. It became the country's ninth all-time best-selling digital single in 2015. On April 1, 2016, the song was certified Diamond, the first country song to achieve this status. The certification includes streams, which numbered more than 155 million by April 2015. As of November 2016, the song has sold 7,598,000 copies in the U.S. The song was certified 14× Platinum by the RIAA on October 10, 2018.

== Charts and certifications ==
=== Weekly charts ===
| Chart (2012–2013) | Peak position |
|---|---|
| Australia (ARIA) | 63 |
| Canada Hot 100 (Billboard) | 38 |
| Canada AC (Billboard) | 25 |
| Canada CHR/Top 40 (Billboard) | 9 |
| Canada Country (Billboard) | 1 |
| Canada Hot AC (Billboard) | 5 |
| Netherlands (Dutch Top 40) | 30 |
| New Zealand (Recorded Music NZ) | 34 |
| Scottish Singles Sales (Official Charts) | 59 |
| Slovakia Airplay (ČNS IFPI) | 43 |
| UK Singles (Official Charts) | 75 |
| US Billboard Hot 100 | 4 |
| US Adult Contemporary (Billboard) | 13 |
| US Adult Pop Airplay (Billboard) | 6 |
| US Country Airplay (Billboard); Original version | 1 |
| US Hot Country Songs (Billboard); Original version | 1 |
| US Pop Airplay (Billboard) | 7 |

=== Year-end charts ===
| Chart (2012) | Position |
|---|---|
| US Hot Country Songs (Billboard) | 65 |
| US Ringtones (Billboard) | 48 |

| Chart (2013) | Position |
|---|---|
| Netherlands (Dutch Top 40) | 145 |
| US Billboard Hot 100 | 9 |
| US Adult Contemporary (Billboard) | 30 |
| US Adult Top 40 (Billboard) | 30 |
| US Hot Country Songs (Billboard) | 1 |
| US Country Airplay (Billboard) | 60 |
| US Mainstream Top 40 (Billboard) | 39 |

=== Decade-end charts ===
| Chart (2010–2019) | Position |
|---|---|
| US Hot Country Songs (Billboard) | 3 |

=== Certifications ===
| Region | Certification | Certified units/sales |
|---|---|---|
| Australia (ARIA) | 2× Platinum | 140,000^{‡} |
| Canada (Music Canada) | 2× Platinum | 160,000^{*} |
| New Zealand (RMNZ) | 2× Platinum | 60,000^{‡} |
| United Kingdom (BPI) | Silver | 200,000^{‡} |
| United States (RIAA) | 14× Platinum | 7,598,000 |
^{*} Sales figures based on certification alone.^{‡} Sales+streaming figures based on certification alone.
