= Stay (Black Stone Cherry song) =

2011 song by Black Stone Cherry

Song by Black Stone Cherry

from the album Between the Devil and the Deep Blue Sea
- Released: May 31, 2011
- Genre: Southern rock
- Length: 3:24
- Label: Roadrunner
- Songwriters: Chris Robertson; Ben Wells; Jon Lawhon; John Fred Young; Joey Moi
- Producer: Howard Benson

Music video
- "Stay" on YouTube

"Stay" is a song by American rock band Black Stone Cherry, written by the band along with Joey Moi. Black Stone Cherry recorded it on their 2011 album Between the Devil and the Deep Blue Sea, produced by Howard Benson.

The song was covered by Florida Georgia Line in 2012 and released as a single in 2013. This version has been certified double Platinum by the RIAA.

== Florida Georgia Line version ==
"Stay"

Single by Florida Georgia Line

from the album Here's to the Good Times
- Released: October 7, 2013
- Recorded: 2012
- Genre: Country rock
- Length: 3:19
- Label: Republic Nashville
- Songwriters: Joey Moi; Black Stone Cherry
- Producer: Joey Moi

Florida Georgia Line singles chronology
"Round Here" (2013)	"Stay" (2013)	"The South" (2014)

Music video
- "Stay" on YouTube

American country music duo Florida Georgia Line covered the song on their 2012 album Here's to the Good Times. It was released in October 2013 as the album's fourth single.

=== Critical reception ===
In his review of Here's to the Good Times, Billy Dukes of Taste of Country called it "the biggest dud on the album" and wrote that "it’s a clumsy beginner’s effort that only shows off FGL’s vocal flaws when they stray from the party jams." Matt Bjorke of Roughstock was more favorable, writing that "despite being a cover of a Black Stone Cherry song, it suits Florida Georgia Line and is emotional and features some nice mandolin and steel guitar work (though you'll have to strain a bit to hear the latter)."

=== Music video ===
The music video was directed by Peter Zavadil and premiered in October 2013. It stars Josh Henderson in the leading role.

The video starts off the day after the rest of the video takes place, showing a sad woman sitting in front of a burned down house. A dog goes through the ruins, finds a shattered mobile phone, and gives it to her. The woman starts crying.

Then, the reason for this is revealed. When the song starts, a man is shown standing in the doorway of the house when it was still intact. The woman, revealed to be the man's girlfriend or wife, drives away in a car (presuming the man did something to drive her mad and leave). The man then sends the woman some text messages, but the woman does not respond. The man loses his mind, and destroys his possessions, including vintage electricals and furniture, and a vintage television.

The woman then goes to a motel. When the man checks his phone again, there are still no new messages, so he sets fire to all his possessions, including the furniture, the house, his phone, and a picture of the man and his girlfriend, back when they were still in love, before driving away. In her motel room, she finally realizes that he meant no harm to hurt her and takes off. At the end of the video, the girlfriend drives back to the house, only to see the house on fire. Then she steps out of the car, shocked that her boyfriend did this. Throughout, the duo is seen performing the song inside the house, outside the now burned down house, and with a full band in front of the burning house at night.

=== Commercial performance ===
"Stay" debuted at number 57 on the U.S. Billboard Country Airplay chart for the week of September 28, 2013, at the same time that their Florida Georgia Line's previous single "Round Here" was at number one. It also debuted at number 47 on the U.S. Billboard Hot Country Songs chart for the week of December 22, 2012. It also debuted at number 85 on the U.S. Billboard Hot 100 chart for the week of November 2, 2013. The song reached over a million in sales in the United States by April 2014.

The song also debuted at number 73 on the Canadian Hot 100 chart for the week of November 23, 2013.

=== Weekly charts ===
Chart (2013–2014)	Peak position
Canada Hot 100 (Billboard)	39
Canada Country (Billboard)	1
US Billboard Hot 100	28
US Country Airplay (Billboard)	1
US Hot Country Songs (Billboard)	1

=== Year-end charts ===
Chart (2013)	Position
US Country Airplay (Billboard)	97
US Hot Country Songs (Billboard)	85

Chart (2014)	Position
US Country Airplay (Billboard)	49
US Hot Country Songs (Billboard)	25

=== Certifications ===
Region	Certification	Certified units/sales
United States (RIAA)	2× Platinum	1,039,000
