= Nashville Harbor Records & Entertainment =

Record label based in Nashville, Tennessee

- Parent company: HYBE America
- Founded: 2009; 17 years ago
- Founder: Scott Borchetta; Jimmy Harnen
- Genre: Country
- Country of origin: United States
- Location: Nashville, Tennessee

Nashville Harbor Records & Entertainment, is a record label established in 2009 in Nashville.

== History ==
Until 2015, the label was owned by the Universal Music Group; however, in July 2015, the Big Machine Label Group acquired full ownership of the label as part of distribution negotiations. In August 2016, Republic Nashville was rebranded as BMLG Records. In February 2024, BMLG Records rebranded as Nashville Harbor Records & Entertainment. Following the acquisition by HYBE America in 2021, the label strongly propelled Riley Green's career and managed the releases of artists such as The Band Perry. In February 2026, after Scott Borchetta's departure, all of the label's music came under the primary supervision and distribution of Blue Highway Records (the new Nashville division created by HYBE under the leadership of its new CEO, Jake Basden).

== Nashville Harbor Records & Entertainment roster ==
- Riley Green
- Lady A
- Brett Young
- The Band Perry
- Hunter Flynn

=== Past artists ===
- Danielle Bradbery (moved to Big Machine)
- Greg Bates
- Eli Young Band (moved to Valory)
- Fast Ryde
- Florida Georgia Line
- Ryan Follese
- Jaron and the Long Road to Love
- Jackie Lee
- Martina McBride (moved to Nash Icon)
- Cassadee Pope
- SHEL
- Dallas Smith
- Sunny Sweeney
- A Thousand Horses
- Drake White

==== Past Dot Records artists ====
- Tucker Beathard (moved to Big Machine)
- Craig Wayne Boyd
- Ashley Campbell
- Aaron Lewis (moved to Valory)
- Maddie & Tae
- Carly Pearce (moved to Big Machine)
- Drake White (moved to BMLG)
- Steven Tyler
- The Shires
- Zac Brown Band

== See also ==
- List of record labels
