= Thomas Rhett discography =

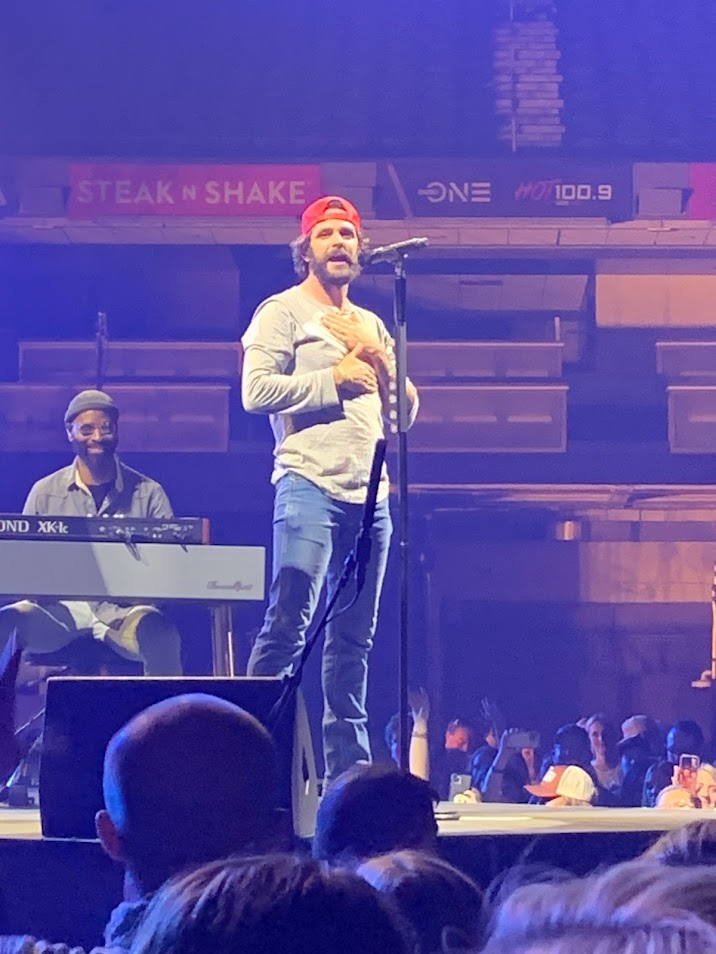
- Rhett performing in Indianapolis in May 2023
- Studio albums: 7
- EPs: 2
- Compilation albums: 1
- Singles: 35
- Music videos: 29
- No. 1 singles: 23
- Promotional singles: 19
- Other charted songs: 11

American singer and songwriter Thomas Rhett has released seven studio albums, two extended plays and 28 singles, including five as a featured artist. USA Today dubbed him the "Prince of Country Music" for attaining 18 No. 1 hits in just 9 years. Billboard ranked him as the 12th Top Country Artist of the 2010s decade and the 95th Top Artist of the Decade overall. Rhett has scored 2 No. 1 albums on the Billboard 200. According to the Recording Industry Association of America (RIAA), Rhett has sold 53 million singles and 4.5 million certified albums in the United States.

His debut album, It Goes Like This, debuted in the top 10 of the Billboard 200 in 2013 and produced three number one singles on the Billboard Country Airplay chart. Rhett released his second album Tangled Up in 2015, which peaked at number six on the Billboard 200. Four of the album's five singles reached number one on the country charts, while the second single, "Die a Happy Man" became his first crossover success and highest-charting single on the Billboard Hot 100. His third album, Life Changes, was released in 2017 and includes four chart-topping singles "Craving You", "Unforgettable", "Marry Me", and "Sixteen". On March 1, 2019, Rhett released another chart-topper "Look What God Gave Her" as the lead single to his fourth studio album, Center Point Road. The album was released on May 31. "Remember You Young" was the album's second single, while "Beer Can't Fix" featuring Jon Pardi was the third single. In 2020, Rhett released the standalone single "Be a Light", a star-studded collaboration featuring Reba McEntire, Hillary Scott, Chris Tomlin and Keith Urban. All proceeds earned from the song are donated to the MusiCares COVID-19 Relief Fund.

In March 2021, Rhett announced a double album release, with the first part, Country Again: Side A, released on April 30, 2021. It includes the singles "What's Your Country Song" and "Country Again." In November 2021, he released "Slow Down Summer", which was the lead single from his sixth studio album Where We Started, released on April 1, 2022. The album's second single, "Half of Me," was released on June 6, 2022, as a collaboration with Riley Green. Rhett released the album's third single, "Angels (Don't Always Have Wings)" on January 23, 2023. The album's latter two singles reached number one on the Country Airplay chart, surpassing twenty number-one singles on Country Aircheck/MediaBase chart in his career. On October 21, 2022, Rhett released his EP Merry Christmas, Y'all, featuring his take on four Christmas classics. On September 29, 2023, Rhett released "20 Number Ones," a greatest hits album, including "Mamaw's House," which was released as a single and features Morgan Wallen. On May 10, 2024, Rhett released the song "Beautiful as You". On June 5, 2024, Rhett announced that his seventh album About a Woman would be released on August 23, 2024. The album had several reissues and was promoted through radio hits "After All the Bars Are Closed", "Somethin' 'Bout a Woman" with Teddy Swims, and "Ain't a Bad Life" with Jordan Davis.

28 of Rhett's singles have received at least a Gold certification from the RIAA, with 23 going Platinum, and one being certified Diamond. Rhett has also written songs for other country artists, and made history in 2013 when half of the top 10 singles on the Country Airplay chart were written by Rhett or his father, Rhett Akins, including the singer's own chart-topping hit, "It Goes Like This".

== Albums ==
=== Studio albums ===
Title	Details	Peak chart positions					Certifications
Title	Details	US	US Country	AUS	CAN	UK	Certifications
It Goes Like This	Release date: October 29, 2013; Label: Valory	6	2	—	23	—	RIAA: Platinum; MC: Gold
Tangled Up	Release date: September 25, 2015; Label: Valory	6	2	77	2	80	RIAA: 2× Platinum; MC: Platinum
Life Changes	Release date: September 8, 2017; Label: Valory	1	1	30	2	54	RIAA: Platinum; MC: Platinum
Center Point Road	Release date: May 31, 2019; Label: Valory	1	1	24	2	—	RIAA: Gold; MC: Platinum
Country Again: Side A	Release date: April 30, 2021; Label: Valory	10	2	65	13	—	MC: Gold
Where We Started	Release date: April 1, 2022; Label: Valory	12	2	84	20	—	
About a Woman	Release date: August 23, 2024; Label: Valory	19	10	96	42	—	MC: Gold
"—" denotes releases that did not chart.

=== Compilation albums ===
Title	Details	Peak chart positions			
Title	Details	US	US Country	AUS Country	CAN
20 Number Ones	Release date: September 29, 2023; Label: Valory	22	7	15	31

== Extended plays ==
Title	Details	Peak chart positions		
Title	Details	US	US Country	US Heat
Thomas Rhett	Release date: August 28, 2012; Label: Valory	133	24	3
Merry Christmas, Y'all	Release date: October 21, 2022; Label: Valory	—	—	—

== Singles ==
=== As lead artist ===
Title	Year	Peak chart positions							Certifications (sales threshold)	Album
Title	Year	US	US Country Songs	US Country Airplay	US Adult	CAN	CAN Country	NZ Hot	Certifications (sales threshold)	Album
"Something to Do with My Hands"	2012	93	15	15	—	90	22	—		It Goes Like This
"Beer with Jesus"	2012	— (Note: "Beer with Jesus" did not enter the Hot 100, but peaked at number 1 on the Bubbling Under Hot 100.)	26	19	—	—	36	—	RIAA: Gold	It Goes Like This
"It Goes Like This"	2013	25	2	1	—	33	4	—	RIAA: 4× Platinum; ARIA: Gold	It Goes Like This
"Get Me Some of That"	2013	41	4	1	—	49	6	—	RIAA: 4× Platinum; ARIA: Gold	It Goes Like This
"Make Me Wanna"	2014	43	2	1	—	74	11	—	RIAA: 3× Platinum	It Goes Like This
"Crash and Burn"	2015	36	2	1	—	47	1	—	RIAA: 2× Platinum	Tangled Up
"Die a Happy Man"	2015	21	1	1	25	35	1	—	RIAA: Diamond; ARIA: Gold; BPI: Silver; MC: Diamond; RMNZ: Platinum	Tangled Up
"T-Shirt"	2016	41	3	1	—	53	1	—	RIAA: 3× Platinum; ARIA: Gold	Tangled Up
"Vacation"	2016	— (Note: "Vacation" did not enter the Hot 100, but peaked at number 1 on the Bubbling Under Hot 100 Singles.)	19	30	—	—	39	—	RIAA: Platinum	Tangled Up
"Star of the Show"	2016	45	4	1	—	77	1	—	RIAA: Platinum	Tangled Up
"Craving You" (featuring Maren Morris)	2017	39	3	1	—	61	1	—	RIAA: 3× Platinum; ARIA: Gold	Life Changes
"Unforgettable"	2017	47	4	1	—	51	1	—	RIAA: 2× Platinum; ARIA: Platinum; MC: Platinum; RMNZ: Gold	Life Changes
"Marry Me"	2017	30	2	1	—	45	1	—	RIAA: 4× Platinum; ARIA: Platinum; MC: Platinum; RMNZ: Gold	Life Changes
"Life Changes"	2018	36	6	1	—	62	1	—	RIAA: Platinum; ARIA: Gold	Life Changes
"Sixteen"	2018	42	6	1	—	71	1	—	RIAA: Platinum; ARIA: Gold	Life Changes
"Look What God Gave Her"	2019	32	3	1	15	33	1	—	RIAA: 2× Platinum; ARIA: Platinum; RMNZ: Gold	Center Point Road
"Remember You Young"	2019	53	5	1	—	75	1	—	RIAA: Platinum	Center Point Road
"Beer Can't Fix" (featuring Jon Pardi)	2020	36	6	1	—	45	1	—	RIAA: Platinum; ARIA: Gold; MC: Platinum	Center Point Road
"Be a Light" (featuring Reba McEntire, Hillary Scott, Chris Tomlin, and Keith Urban)	2020	42	7	2	—	74	3	—	RIAA: Platinum	20 Number Ones
"What's Your Country Song"	2020	29	1	1	—	37	1	—	RIAA: 2× Platinum; ARIA: Gold; MC: Gold	Country Again: Side A
"Country Again"	2021	42	5	1	—	42	1	—	RIAA: Platinum	Country Again: Side A
"Slow Down Summer"	2021	43	9	2	—	64	4	—	RIAA: Platinum	Where We Started
"Half of Me" (featuring Riley Green)	2022	52	9	1	—	54	1	—	RIAA: Platinum; MC: 2× Platinum	Where We Started
"Angels (Don't Always Have Wings)"	2023	69	17	1	—	83	4	—	RIAA: Gold; MC: Gold	Where We Started
"Mamaw's House" (featuring Morgan Wallen)	2023	55	14	1	—	46	1	—	RIAA: Gold; MC: Gold	20 Number Ones
"Beautiful as You"	2024	50	10	2	—	57	7	—	RIAA: Gold; MC: Platinum	About a Woman
"After All the Bars Are Closed"	2024	35	8	1	—	46	1	—		About a Woman
"Somethin' 'Bout a Woman" (solo or featuring Teddy Swims)	2024	65	17	—	—	95	—	16	RIAA: Platinum; MC: Gold; RMNZ: Gold	About a Woman
"Ain't a Bad Life" (featuring Jordan Davis)	2025	53	14	2	—	88	3	40		About a Woman (Deluxe Edition)
"Be There in a Minute"	2026	87	27	19	—	—	48	—		TBA
"—" denotes releases that did not chart

=== As featured artist ===
Title	Year	Peak chart positions							Certifications (sales threshold)	Album
Title	Year	US	US Country Songs	US Country Airplay	US Christ	CAN	CAN Country	NZ Hot	Certifications (sales threshold)	Album
"Small Town Throwdown" (with Brantley Gilbert and Justin Moore)	2014	67	13	8	—	97	24	—	RIAA: Gold	Just as I Am
"Goodbye Summer" (with Danielle Bradbery)	2018	—	39	39	—	—	49	—		I Don't Believe We've Met
"God Who Listens" (with Chris Tomlin)	2021	—	—	—	13	—	—	—		Chris Tomlin & Friends
"Thank You Lord" (with Chris Tomlin and Florida Georgia Line)	2021	—	37	—	11	—	—	—	RIAA: Gold	Chris Tomlin & Friends
"Praise the Lord" (Breland featuring Thomas Rhett)	2022	100	21	—	—	—	—	—	RIAA: Gold	Cross Country
"Nothing Else" (with Forrest Frank)	2025	— (Note: "Nothing Else" did not enter the Billboard Hot 100, but peaked at number 14 on the Billboard Digital Song Sales.)	—	—	4	—	—	31		Child of God II
"—" denotes releases that did not chart

== Other songs ==
=== Promotional singles ===
Title	Year	Peak chart positions						Certifications	Album
Title	Year	US Bubbling	US Country Songs	US Country Airplay	CAN	CAN Country	NZ Hot	Certifications	Album
"When I Was Your Man"	2015	7	27	—	—	—	—		Non-album single
"Grave"	2017	9	23	—	—	—	—		Life Changes
"Sweetheart"	2017	—	41	—	—	—	—		Life Changes
"Leave Right Now"	2018	—	38	—	—	—	—	RIAA: Gold	Life Changes
"Don't Threaten Me with a Good Time" (featuring Little Big Town)	2019	—	—	—	—	—	—		Center Point Road
"That Old Truck"	2019	—	36	—	—	—	—		Center Point Road
"Center Point Road" (featuring Kelsea Ballerini)	2019	—	31	—	—	—	—		Center Point Road
"Christmas in the Country" (Note: Appeared on Country Airplay chart due to unsolicited airplay.)	2019	—	36	38	—	—	—		Non-album singles
"The Christmas Song"	2019	—	—	49	—	—	—		Non-album singles
"Growing Up"	2021	—	40	—	—	—	—		Country Again: Side A
"Want It Again"	2021	—	— (Note: "Want It Again" did not enter the Hot Country Songs chart, but peaked at number 10 on the Country Digital Song Sales chart.)	—	—	—	—		Country Again: Side A
"Things Dads Do"	2021	—	—	—	—	50	—		Non-album single
"Church Boots"	2022	—	—	—	—	—	—		Where We Started
"Us Someday"	2022	—	—	—	—	—	—		Where We Started
"Death Row" (featuring Tyler Hubbard and Russell Dickerson)	2022	—	—	—	—	—	—		Where We Started
"Where We Started" (with Katy Perry)	2022	—	33	—	—	—	—		Where We Started
"C'est La Vie" (with Surfaces)	2022	—	—	—	—	—	—		Pacifico (Deluxe)
"Ain't a Bad Life" (featuring Jordan Davis)	2025	—	—	—	—	—	40		About a Woman (Deluxe Edition)
"Old Tricks" (featuring Niall Horan)	2025	—	—	—	—	—	28		About a Woman (Deluxe Edition)
"—" denotes releases that did not chart

=== Other charted songs ===
Title	Year	Peak chart positions				Certifications	Album
Title	Year	US Bubbling	US Country Songs	US Country Airplay	CAN	Certifications	Album
"Take You Home"	2013	—	44	—	—		It Goes Like This
"Playing with Fire" (featuring Jordin Sparks)	2015	—	40	—	—		Tangled Up
"The Day You Stop Lookin' Back"	2015	—	47	—	—		Tangled Up
"Like It's the Last Time"	2015	—	48	—	—		Tangled Up
"Drink a Little Beer" (featuring Rhett Akins)	2017	—	42	51	—		Life Changes
"When You Look Like That"	2017	—	49	—	—		Life Changes
"Notice"	2019	14	21	—	—		Center Point Road
"Blessed"	2019	—	39	—	—	RIAA: Gold	Center Point Road
"On Me" (with Kane Brown featuring Ava Max)	2020	—	—	—	91	RIAA: Gold	Scoob! The Album
"Dance With Me" (with Diplo & Young Thug)	2020	—	—	—	58	MC: 2× Platinum; RMNZ: Gold	Diplo Presents Thomas Wesley, Chapter 1: Snake Oil
"To the Guys That Date My Girls"	2021	—	— (Note: "To the Guys That Date My Girls" did not enter the Hot Country Songs chart, but peaked at number 25 on the Country Digital Song Sales chart.)	—	—		Country Again: Side A
"—" denotes releases that did not chart

=== Other appearances ===
Title	Year	Artist	Album
"My Maria"	2019	Brooks & Dunn	Reboot

== Music videos ==
Title	Year	Director
"Something to Do with My Hands"	2012	Justin Key
"Something to Do with My Hands" (version 2)	2012	Peter Zavadil
"Beer with Jesus"	2012	Peter Zavadil
"It Goes Like This"	2013	TK McKamy
"Get Me Some of That"	2013	TK McKamy
"Small Town Throwdown" (with Brantley Gilbert and Justin Moore)	2014	Shane Drake
"Make Me Wanna"	2014	TK McKamy
"When I Was Your Man"	2015	
"Crash and Burn"	2015	TK McKamy
"Die a Happy Man"	2015	TK McKamy
"T-Shirt"	2016	Blake Judd
"Vacation"	2016	TK McKamy
"Star of the Show"	2016	TK McKamy
"American Spirit"	2017	TK McKamy
"Craving You" (with Maren Morris)	2017	TK McKamy
"Unforgettable" (live at CMA Awards)	2017	Paul Miller
"Marry Me"	2017	TK McKamy
"Leave Right Now"	2018	Justin Clough
"Goodbye Summer" (with Danielle Bradbery)	2018	Shaun Silva
"Life Changes"	2018	Michael Monaco
"Look What God Gave Her"	2019	TK McKamy
"Remember You Young"	2019	TK McKamy
"Beer Can't Fix" (with Jon Pardi)	2020	Shaun Silva
"What's Your Country Song"	2020	TK McKamy
"Country Again"	2021	TK McKamy
"Slow Down Summer"	2021	Patrick Tracy
"Where We Started" (with Katy Perry)	2022	Patrick Tracy
"Overdrive"	2024	TK McKamy
"After All the Bars Are Closed"	2024	TK McKamy

== Writing credits ==
Title	Year	Artist	Album
"I Ain't Ready to Quit"	2010	Jason Aldean	My Kinda Party
"Write My Number on Your Hand"	2011	Scotty McCreery	Clear as Day
"1994"	2012	Jason Aldean	Night Train
"Parking Lot Party"	2012	Lee Brice	Hard 2 Love
"Round Here"	2012	Florida Georgia Line	Here's to the Good Times
"Sunburnt Lips"	2013	Luke Bryan	Crash My Party (Deluxe Edition)
"Think a Little Less"	2015	Michael Ray	Michael Ray
"Ring on Every Finger"	2016	LoCash	The Fighters
"What Are We Doing"	2017	Danielle Bradbery	I Don't Believe We've Met
"Some People Do"	2019	Old Dominion	Old Dominion
"Finish Your Sentences"	2020	Carly Pearce & Michael Ray	Carly Pearce
"Looking Back"	2020	Rascal Flatts	How They Remember You (EP)
"Don't Need the Whiskey"	2020	Dallas Smith	Timeless
"Whiskey'd My Way"	2021	Morgan Wallen	Dangerous: The Double Album
"Your Bartender"	2021	Morgan Wallen	Dangerous: The Double Album
"That Was Us"	2021	Riley Green featuring Jessi Alexander	Behind the Bar (EP)
"Stars Like Confetti"	2022	Dustin Lynch	Blue in the Sky
"She Had Me at Heads Carolina"	2022	Cole Swindell	Stereotype
"Me for Me"	2023	Tyler Hubbard	Tyler Hubbard
"We Should Get a Drink Sometimes"	2023	Michael Ray	TBA
"Georgia Is Yours"	2024	Sugarland	There Goes the Neighborhood (EP)
