= 20 Number Ones =

Greatest hits album by Thomas Rhett
- Released: September 29, 2023
- Genre: Country
- Length: 68:22
- Label: Valory

Thomas Rhett chronology
Merry Christmas, Y'all (2022)	20 Number Ones (2023)	About a Woman (2024)

Singles from 20 Number Ones
- 1. "Mamaw's House" Released: September 29, 2023

20 Number Ones is the first greatest hits album by American country singer Thomas Rhett. It was released through Valory on September 29, 2023. It is a compilation of his first 20 number-one country music singles, starting with "It Goes Like This" and presented in chronological order. A new track, "Mamaw's House", was also included and became his 20th overall number one at the Billboard Country Airplay chart in 2024. The number "20 Number Ones" includes songs that topped the Country Aircheck/MediaBase chart.

It traces Rhett's path over the last 10 years.

== Track listing ==
20 Number Ones track listing
No.	Title	Writer(s)	Producer(s)	Length
1.	"It Goes Like This" (from It Goes Like This)	Rhett Akins; Ben Hayslip; Jimmy Robbins	Michael Knox	3:06
2.	"Get Me Some of That" (from It Goes Like This)	Michael Carter; Akins; Cole Swindell	Luke Laird	3:08
3.	"Make Me Wanna" (from It Goes Like This)	Thomas Rhett; Bart Butler; Larry McCoy	Jay Joyce	3:46
4.	"Crash and Burn" (from Tangled Up)	Jesse Frasure; Chris Stapleton	Dann Huff; Jesse Frasure	3:10
5.	"Die a Happy Man" (from Tangled Up)	Rhett; Sean Douglas; Joe Spargur	Huff; Frasure	3:46
6.	"T-Shirt" (from Tangled Up)	Ashley Gorley; Luke Laird; Shane McAnally	Huff; Frasure	3:45
7.	"Star of the Show" (from Tangled Up)	Rhett; Akins; Ben Hayslip	Joe London; Julian Bunetta; Rhett	3:02
8.	"Craving You" (featuring Maren Morris, from Life Changes)	Dave Barnes; Bunetta	Rhett; Bunetta; London; Huff	3:43
9.	"Unforgettable" (from Life Changes)	Rhett; Frasure; Gorley; McAnally	Rhett; Huff; Frasure	2:37
10.	"Marry Me" (from Life Changes)	Rhett; Frasure; Gorley; McAnally	Rhett; Huff; Frasure	3:26
11.	"Life Changes" (from Life Changes)	Rhett; Akins; Frasure; Gorley	Rhett; Huff; Frasure	3:10
12.	"Sixteen" (from Life Changes)	Rhett; Douglas; Spargur	Rhett; Huff; Frasure	2:58
13.	"Look What God Gave Her" (from Center Point Road)	Rhett; Akins; Bunetta; Josh Ryan; Jacob Kasher; Ammar Malik	Rhett; Huff; Bunetta	2:48
14.	"Remember You Young" (from Center Point Road)	Rhett; Gorley; Frasure	Rhett; Huff; Frasure	3:00
15.	"Beer Can't Fix" (featuring Jon Pardi, from Center Point Road)	Rhett; Bunetta; Tedder; Zach Skelton	Rhett; Huff; Bunetta	3:29
16.	"Be a Light" (featuring Reba McEntire, Hillary Scott, Chris Tomlin, and Keith Urban)	Rhett; Matt Dragstrem; Josh Miller; Josh Thompson	Huff	2:50
17.	"What's Your Country Song" (from Country Again: Side A)	Rhett; Akins; Frasure; Gorley; Parker Welling	Huff; Frasure	2:51
18.	"Country Again" (from Country Again: Side A)	Rhett; Gorley; Zach Crowell	Huff; Frasure	3:41
19.	"Slow Down Summer" (from Where We Started)	Rhett; Akins; Frasure; Gorley; Douglas	Huff; Frasure	3:36
20.	"Half of Me" (featuring Riley Green, from Where We Started)	Rhett; Thompson; Akins; Will Bundy	Huff; Frasure	3:02
21.	"Angels (Don't Always Have Wings)" (from Where We Started)	Rhett; Thompson; Bunetta; Teddy Swims	Huff; Frasure; Bunetta	3:34
Total length:				68:22

Bonus version
No.	Title	Writer(s)	Producer(s)	Length
22.	"Mamaw's House" (featuring Morgan Wallen)	Morgan Wallen; Rhett; Dragstrem; Chase McGill	Huff; Frasure	3:07
Total length:				71:29

== Charts ==
=== Weekly charts ===
Weekly chart performance for 20 Number Ones
Chart (2023)	Peak position
Australian Country Albums (ARIA)	15
Canadian Albums (Billboard)	31
US Billboard 200	22
US Top Country Albums (Billboard)	7

=== Year-end charts ===
2024 year-end chart performance for 20 Number Ones
Chart (2024)	Position
Australian Country Albums (ARIA)	20
US Billboard 200	91
US Top Country Albums (Billboard)	21

2025 year-end chart performance for 20 Number Ones
Chart (2025)	Position
US Billboard 200	133
US Top Country Albums (Billboard)	26
