= Very Hot Summer Tour =

2019 concert tour by Thomas Rhett

- Tour by Thomas Rhett
- Promotional poster for the tour
- Location: North America
- Associated album: Center Point Road
- Start date: April 24, 2019
- End date: October 12, 2019
- Legs: 1
- No. of shows: 49

Thomas Rhett concert chronology
- Life Changes Tour (2018); Very Hot Summer Tour (2019); Center Point Road Tour (2020)

The Very Hot Summer Tour was the third headlining concert tour by American country music artist Thomas Rhett. The tour was in support of his fourth studio album Center Point Road (2019). It began on April 24, 2019, in Montreal, Quebec and concluded on October 12, 2019, in Nashville, Tennessee. Dustin Lynch, Russell Dickerson, and Rhett's father, Rhett Akins opened the shows. The tour was announced in November 2018.

== Opening acts ==
- Dustin Lynch
- Russell Dickerson
- Rhett Akins
- Tyler Hubbard (Nashville)
- Little Big Town (Nashville)
- Hardy (Nashville)

== Critical reception ==
Madeline Colman of The Charlotte Observer said, "Throughout the night, there was a consistently upbeat atmosphere." which was "electric."

== Setlist ==
This is an average setlist for the tour.

1. "Look What God Gave Her"
2. "Crash and Burn"
3. "Get Me Some of That"
4. "Craving You"
5. "Sixteen"
6. "Don't Threaten Me with a Good Time"
7. "It Goes Like This"
8. "Remember You Young"
9. "Make Me Wanna" / "Suit & Tie" (Justin Timberlake cover)
10. "Life Changes"
11. "That Old Truck"
12. "Star of the Show"
13. "Round Here" (Florida Georgia Line cover)
14. "Creepin'" / "Homeboy" (Eric Church cover)
15. "Vacation"
16. "Marry Me"
17. "Die a Happy Man"
18. "Unforgettable"

Encore

19. "T-Shirt"

== Tour dates ==
List of concerts showing: date, city, country, venue, and opening acts
Date	City	Country	Venue
April 24, 2019	Montreal	Canada	Bell Centre
April 26, 2019	Ottawa	Canada	Canadian Tire Centre
April 27, 2019	London	Canada	Budweiser Stage
May 2, 2019	Saskatoon	Canada	SaskTel Centre
May 3, 2019	Regina	Canada	Brandt Centre
May 4, 2019	Winnipeg	Canada	Bell MTS Place
May 8, 2019	Calgary	Canada	Scotiabank Saddledome
May 10, 2019	Edmonton	Canada	Rogers Place
May 15, 2019	Vancouver	Canada	Rogers Arena
May 17, 2019	Spokane	United States	Spokane Arena
May 18, 2019	Tacoma	United States	Tacoma Dome
May 25, 2019	Orange Beach	United States	Amphitheater at the Wharf
May 26, 2019	Orange Beach	United States	Amphitheater at the Wharf
June 13, 2019	Virginia Beach	United States	Veterans United Home Loans Amphitheater
June 14, 2019	Charlotte	United States	PNC Music Pavilion
June 15, 2019	Bristow	United States	Jiffy Lube Live
June 20, 2019	Clarkston	United States	DTE Energy Music Theatre
June 21, 2019	Noblesville	United States	Ruoff Home Mortgage Music Center
June 26, 2019	Milwaukee	United States	American Family Insurance Amphitheater
June 28, 2019	Dallas	United States	Dos Equis Pavilion
June 15, 2019	Bristow	United States	Jiffy Lube Live
July 11, 2019	Toronto	Canada	Budweiser Stage
July 12, 2019	Burrgettstown	United States	KeyBank Pavilion
July 18, 2019	Columbia	United States	Merriweather Post Pavilion
July 19, 2019	Darien	United States	Darien Lake Performing Arts Center
July 20, 2019	Hershey	United States	Hersheypark Stadium
August 1, 2019	Camden	United States	BB&T Pavilion
August 2, 2019	Mansfield	United States	Xfinity Center
August 3, 2019	Holmdel	United States	PNC Bank Arts Center
August 8, 2019	Raleigh	United States	Coastal Credit Union Music Park
August 9, 2019	Cincinnati	United States	Riverbend Music Center
August 10, 2019	Atlanta	United States	Cellairis Amphitheatre
August 15, 2019	Rogers	United States	Walmart Arkansas Music Pavilion
August 16, 2019	Southaven	United States	BankPlus Amphitheater
August 17, 2019	Pelham	United States	Oak Mountain Amphitheatre
September 5, 2019	Sioux Falls	United States	Denny Sanford Premier Center
September 6, 2019	Des Moines	United States	Wells Fargo Arena
September 7, 2019	Saint Paul	United States	Xcel Energy Center
September 12, 2019	Kansas City	United States	Sprint Center
September 13, 2019	St. Louis	United States	Enterprise Center
September 14, 2019	Chicago	United States	United Center
September 19, 2019	Bridgeport	United States	Webster Bank Arena
September 20, 2019	New York City	United States	Madison Square Garden
September 21, 2019	Albany	United States	Times Union Center
October 3, 2019	Greenville	United States	Bon Secours Wellness Arena
October 4, 2019	Jacksonville	United States	Jacksonville Veterans Memorial Arena
October 5, 2019	Orlando	United States	Amway Center
October 10, 2019	Knoxville	United States	Thompson-Boling Arena
October 12, 2019	Louisville	United States	KFC Yum Center
October 13, 2019	Nashville	United States	Bridgestone Arena
