= List of number-one country singles of 2018 (Canada) =

Canada Country was a chart published weekly by Billboard magazine.

This 50-position chart lists the most popular country music songs, calculated weekly by airplay on 46 country music stations across the country as monitored by Nielsen BDS. Songs are ranked by total plays. As with most other Billboard charts, the Canada Country chart features a rule for when a song enters recurrent rotation. A song is declared recurrent if it has been on the chart longer than 30 weeks and is lower than number 20 in rank.

These are the Canadian number-one country singles of 2018, per the BDS Canada Country Airplay chart.

Note that Billboard published charts with an issue date approximately 7–10 days in advance through the chart dated January 3, 2018. The magazine shifted its chart publication schedule to better align with release dates, resulting in an extra "week" published on January 6, 2018.

Issue date	Country Song	Artist	Ref.
January 3	"Like I Loved You"	Brett Young	
January 6	"Like I Loved You"	Brett Young	
January 13	"Like I Loved You"	Brett Young	
January 20	"Like I Loved You"	Brett Young	
January 27	"Sleepin' Around"	Dallas Smith	
February 3	"Written in the Sand"	Old Dominion	
February 10	"Written in the Sand"	Old Dominion	
February 17	"Written in the Sand"	Old Dominion	
February 24	"Marry Me"	Thomas Rhett	
March 3	"8th Day"	Dean Brody	
March 10	"Marry Me"	Thomas Rhett	
March 17	"Marry Me"	Thomas Rhett	
March 24	"Marry Me"	Thomas Rhett	
March 31	"Most People Are Good"	Luke Bryan	
April 7	"Most People Are Good"	Luke Bryan	
April 14	"Criminal"	Lindsay Ell	
April 21	"Singles You Up"	Jordan Davis	
April 28	"You Make It Easy"	Jason Aldean	
May 5	"You Make It Easy"	Jason Aldean	
May 12	"One Number Away"	Luke Combs	
May 19	"One Number Away"	Luke Combs	
May 26	"Heaven"	Kane Brown	
June 2	"Heaven"	Kane Brown	
June 9	"Woman, Amen"	Dierks Bentley	
June 16	"Woman, Amen"	Dierks Bentley	
June 23	"Up Down"	Morgan Wallen featuring Florida Georgia Line	
June 30	"Get Along"	Kenny Chesney	
July 7	"Get Along"	Kenny Chesney	
July 14	"I Was Jack (You Were Diane)"	Jake Owen	
July 21	"I Was Jack (You Were Diane)"	Jake Owen	
July 28	"Coming Home"	Keith Urban featuring Julia Michaels	
August 4	"Tequila"	Dan + Shay	
August 11	"Tequila"	Dan + Shay	
August 18	"Life Changes"	Thomas Rhett	
August 25	"Drowns the Whiskey"	Jason Aldean featuring Miranda Lambert	
September 1	"Drowns the Whiskey"	Jason Aldean featuring Miranda Lambert	
September 8	"Simple"	Florida Georgia Line	
September 15	"Simple"	Florida Georgia Line	
September 22	"Dive Bar"	Gord Bamford	
September 29	"Simple"	Florida Georgia Line	
October 6	"She Got the Best of Me"	Luke Combs	
October 13	"She Got the Best of Me"	Luke Combs	
October 20	"She Got the Best of Me"	Luke Combs	
October 27	"Make 'Em Like You"	Dallas Smith	
November 3	"Lose It"	Kane Brown	
November 10	"Lose It"	Kane Brown	
November 17	"Lose It"	Kane Brown	
November 24	"Who's Gonna Love You"	Tebey	
December 1	"Burning Man"	Dierks Bentley featuring Brothers Osborne	
December 8	"Best Shot"	Jimmie Allen	
December 15	"Down to the Honkytonk"	Jake Owen	
December 22	"Walls Come Down"	Meghan Patrick	
December 29	"Sixteen"	Thomas Rhett	

== See also ==
- 2018 in country music
- List of number-one country singles of 2018 (U.S.)
