= 52nd Annual Country Music Association Awards =

2018 US music award ceremony

- Date: November 14, 2018
- Location: Bridgestone Arena; Nashville, Tennessee
- Hosted by: Brad Paisley; Carrie Underwood

Highlights
- Most wins: Chris Stapleton (3)
- Most nominations: Chris Stapleton (5)

Television/radio coverage
- Network: ABC
- Viewership: 10.1 million

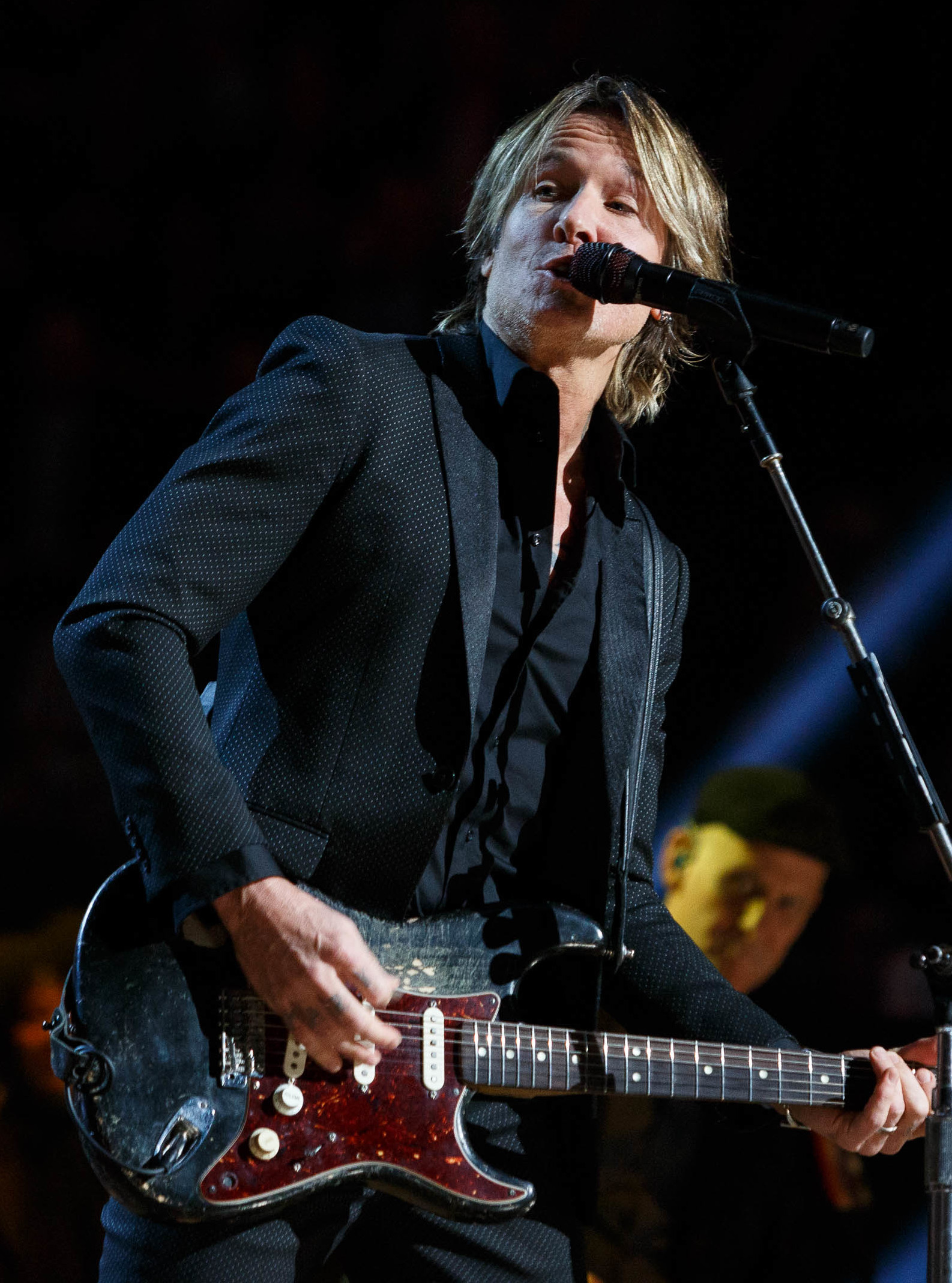
Keith Urban, Entertainer of the Year recipient.

The 52nd Annual Country Music Association Awards, commonly known as the 52nd CMA Awards, were held on November 14, 2018, at the Bridgestone Arena in Nashville, Tennessee and was hosted for the eleventh and final time by CMA Award winners Brad Paisley and Carrie Underwood.

== Winners and nominees ==
The nominations for the 52nd CMA Awards were announced on August 28, 2018, on Good Morning America by Luke Bryan, Dan + Shay and Sugarland.

The winners are shown in Bold.

Entertainer of the Year	Album of the Year
**Keith Urban**; Jason Aldean; Luke Bryan; Kenny Chesney; Chris Stapleton	**Golden Hour —** **Kacey Musgraves**; The Mountain — Dierks Bentley; Life Changes — Thomas Rhett; From A Room: Volume 2 — Chris Stapleton; Graffiti U — Keith Urban
Male Vocalist of the Year	Female Vocalist of the Year
**Chris Stapleton**; Dierks Bentley; Luke Combs; Thomas Rhett; Keith Urban	**Carrie Underwood**; Kelsea Ballerini; Miranda Lambert; Maren Morris; Kacey Musgraves
Vocal Group of the Year	Vocal Duo of the Year
**Old Dominion**; Lady Antebellum; LANCO; Little Big Town; Midland	**Brothers Osborne**; Dan + Shay; Florida Georgia Line; Maddie & Tae; Sugarland
Single of the Year	Song of the Year
**"Broken Halos" — Chris Stapleton**; "Drinkin' Problem" — Midland; "Drowns the Whiskey" — Jason Aldean and Miranda Lambert; "Meant to Be" — Bebe Rexha and Florida Georgia Line; "Tequila" — Dan + Shay	**"Broken Halos" — Chris Stapleton and Mike Henderson**; "Body Like a Back Road" — Zach Crowell, Sam Hunt, Shane McAnally, and Josh Osborne; "Drowns the Whiskey" — Brandon Kinney, Jeff Middleton, and Josh Thompson; "Drunk Girl" — Scooter Carusoe, Tom Douglas, and Chris Janson; "Tequila" — Nicolle Galyon, Jordan Reynolds, and Dan Smyers
New Artist of the Year	Musician of the Year
**Luke Combs**; Lauren Alaina; Chris Janson; Midland; Brett Young	**Mac McAnally, Guitar**; Jerry Douglas, Dobro; Paul Franklin, Steele Guitar; Dann Huff, Guitar; Derek Wells, Guitar
Music Video of the Year	Musical Event of the Year
**"Marry Me" — Thomas Rhett; (Dir. TK McKamy)**; "Babe" — Sugarland feat. Taylor Swift; (Dir. Anthony Mandler); "Cry Pretty" — Carrie Underwood; (Dir. Randee St. Nicholas); "Drunk Girl" — Chris Janson; (Dir. Jeff Venable); "Tequila" — Dan + Shay; (Dir. Patrick Tracy)	**"Everything's Gonna Be Alright" — David Lee Murphy and Kenny Chesney**; "Drowns the Whiskey" — Jason Aldean and Miranda Lambert; "Burning Man" — Dierks Bentley and Brothers Osborne; "Dear Hate" — Maren Morris and Vince Gill; "Meant to Be" — Bebe Rexha and Florida Georgia Line

== Performers ==
Artist(s)	Song(s)
Luke Bryan; Luke Combs; Cole Swindell; Lindsay Ell; Chris Janson; Jon Pardi; Ashley McBryde	"What Makes You Country"
Jason Aldean; Miranda Lambert	"Drowns the Whiskey"
Thomas Rhett	"Life Changes"
Dan + Shay	"Tequila"
Lauren Alaina	"A Lesson in Leavin'"
Kelsea Ballerini	"Miss Me More"
Old Dominion	"Hotel Key"
Carrie Underwood	"Love Wins"
Brett Young	"Mercy"
Ricky Skaggs; Kentucky Thunder; Keith Urban; John Osborne; Brad Paisley; Marty Stuart; Sierra Hull; Carson Peters	"Black Eyed Suzie" "Highway 40 Blues" "Country Boy"
Midland	"East Bound and Down"
Bebe Rexha; Florida Georgia Line	"Meant to Be"
Luke Combs	"She Got the Best of Me"
Keith Urban	"Never Comin' Down"
Garth Brooks	"Stronger Than Me"
Pistol Annies	"Got My Name Changed Back"
Dierks Bentley; Brothers Osborne	"Burning Man"
Chris Stapleton; Morgane Stapleton; Maren Morris; Mavis Staples; Marty Stuart	"Friendship" "I'll Take You There"
Brad Paisley	"Bucked Off"
Kacey Musgraves	"Slow Burn"
Eric Church; Joanna Cotten	"Desperate Man"

== Presenters ==
Presenter(s)	Award
Lady Antebellum	Song of the Year
Mackenzie Foy and Noah Schnapp	New Artist of the Year
Jimmie Allen, Dustin Lynch and Carly Pearce	Single of the Year
Kane Brown and Olivia Culpo	Vocal Group of the Year
Little Big Town	Album of the Year
Bobby Bones and Sharna Burgess	Vocal Duo of the Year
Martina McBride and Lara Spencer	Male Vocalist of the Year
Trisha Yearwood and Dennis Quaid	Female Vocalist of the Year
Lionel Richie	Entertainer of the Year

== Reception ==
Underwood and Pasley's monologue was praised for ignoring the subject of politics, with Fox News stating that "despite avoiding controversial topics, Underwood and Paisley still delivered a joke-filled opening monologue that left many in the audience in stitches".

In their review of the best and worst moments of the telecast, The Washington Post praised Stapleton's performance with Morris and Staples, Brooks' "sweet" and "adorable" tribute to Trisha Yearwood, Bryan's opening number, the "fiery" Pistol Annies performance and the Ricky Skaggs tribute and celebrated Musgraves' Album of the Year win as well as the performances on newer artists such as Combs and Dan + Shay. However, they were critical of Paisley and Underwood's monologue, calling it "flat", "lame" and claiming that it "didn't make sense", leaving audience members "confused". Lauren Alaina's tribute to Dottie West was criticised for being too short and Midland's tribute to Burt Reynolds was described as being too confusing and unexplained.
