= What's Your Country Song =

2020 single by Thomas Rhett

Single by Thomas Rhett

from the album Country Again: Side A
- Written: 2019
- Released: November 11, 2020
- Genre: Country pop; Country rock
- Length: 2:51
- Label: Valory
- Songwriters: Thomas Rhett; Ashley Gorley; Jesse Frasure; Parker Welling; Rhett Akins
- Producers: Dann Huff; Jesse Frasure

Thomas Rhett singles chronology
"Be a Light" (2020)	"What's Your Country Song" (2020)	"God Who Listens" (2021)

Music video
- "What's Your Country Song" on YouTube

"What's Your Country Song" is a song recorded by American country pop singer Thomas Rhett for his fifth studio album, Country Again: Side A (2021). The song was written by Rhett, Ashley Gorley, Jesse Frasure, Parker Welling, and Rhett Akins, while produced by Frasure and Dann Huff. The song was inspired by Rhett's road travels across the United States. It was released by Valory on November 11, 2020, as the lead single from the album. The lyrics include a series of questions and directly reference the titles of 16 other country songs, including Akins' "That Ain't My Truck". The song received generally positive reviews from music critics, particularly for its nostalgic quality and referential lyrics.

The song reached number one on the US Billboard Country Airplay, Billboard Hot Country Songs, and Canada Billboard Country charts, becoming Rhett's 16th number one single on the first chart. It also peaked in the top 40 on the Billboard Hot 100 and the Canadian Hot 100. The music video for "What's Your Country Song", which was directed by TK McKamy, intersperses clips of Rhett singing and playing guitar, people living in the countryside, and a high school homecoming football game. Rhett performed the song on television for the first time at the 56th Academy of Country Music Awards in April 2021, and on The Ellen DeGeneres Show the following month.

== Background and production ==
Rhett wrote "What's Your Country Song" in mid-2019 with his father Rhett Akins, along with Ashley Gorley, Jesse Frasure, and Parker Welling. The song was written in a hotel room during a stop of Rhett's Very Hot Summer Tour in Dallas, Texas, for promotion of his fourth studio album Center Point Road (2019). It was the first of several songs written on the trip. In an interview with Kelleigh Bannen, Rhett described the tracks from Country Again: Side A as venturing towards making the type of music that he wanted to, as part of a shift that had "been happening since the beginning of 2019". In a statement, he explained that the inspiration of the song came from his experiences of "traveling on the road and getting to meet people from the country, from California to New York".

According to Rhett, the song was difficult to write because the chorus was written before the verses, a deviation from his typical songwriting process. It originated as a piano vocal, and production was later added to Rhett's satisfaction. Like the other tracks from Country Again: Side A, the song was produced by Frasure and Dann Huff. It was programmed by Frasure, David Huff, and Justin Niebank.

== Music and lyrics ==
"What's Your Country Song"
A 17-second sample of the second verse of "What's Your Country Song", which includes lyrics referencing the titles of more than a dozen country songs.

Musically, "What's Your Country Song" is a country and country rock track, and has a length of two minutes and 51 seconds. It features an electric guitar solo by Huff and additional instrumentals, including acoustic, steel, and bass guitars, Dobro, ganjo, piano, and drums. The lyrics include a series of questions about one's life and memories, culminating in the title question about one's favorite country song. Explaining the intent, Rhett stated that the song "really is just about, what is your country song?", and it was written to evoke a feeling of nostalgia in the listener. Rhett references the titles of many other country songs, including both classic hits and newer songs. The writers experimented with various combinations of song titles and produced multiple versions of "What's Your Country Song" before finalizing the list. The 16 country songs referenced in the released version are:

- "Drive (For Daddy Gene)" by Alan Jackson
- "Whiskey Bent and Hell Bound" by Hank Williams Jr.
- "Mama Tried" by Merle Haggard
- ”Cruise” by Florida Georgia Line
- "Dixieland Delight" by Alabama
- "Chattahoochee" by Alan Jackson
- "Barefoot Blue Jean Night" by Jake Owen
- ”If You're Going Through Hell (Before the Devil Even Knows)” by Rodney Atkins
- "Turn Your Radio On" by Ray Stevens
- "All My Ex's Live in Texas" by George Strait
- "I'm So Lonesome I Could Cry" by Hank Williams
- "Heartbroke" by Ricky Skaggs
- "That Ain't My Truck" by Rhett Akins
- "Friends in Low Places" by Garth Brooks
- "Neon Moon" by Brooks & Dunn
- "I Was Country When Country Wasn't Cool" by Barbara Mandrell
- "Strawberry Wine" by Deana Carter
- "Family Tradition" by Hank Williams Jr.

The song's lyrical style has been compared to "90's Country", a song by Walker Hayes with lyrics that reference the titles of 22 country songs from the 1990s. According to Rhett, each of the songs referenced in "What's Your Country Song" was influential to his artistic development.

== Release and promotion ==
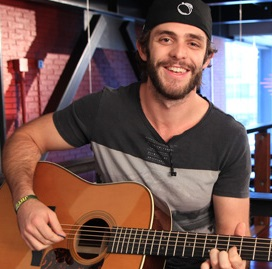
Rhett (pictured) released "What's Your Country Song" as the lead single from Country Again: Side A.

Rhett posted a slow-tempo acoustic clip of "What's Your Country Song" on his Instagram account in April 2020, shortly after he began quarantining at home due to the COVID-19 pandemic. The video received favorable comments from fellow country singers, including Jake Owen and Jimmie Allen, and was viewed over one million times. Rhett teased the song's cover art via his Twitter account on November 6, 2020. The song was released as the lead single from Country Again: Side A on November 11, 2020, the same day as the 54th Annual Country Music Association Awards, where Rhett received two nominations.

In April 2021, Rhett performed "Country Again" and "What's Your Country Song" at the 56th Academy of Country Music Awards, where he won Male Artist of the Year. After a seated acoustic performance of one verse and the chorus of "Country Again", he rose from his chair and transitioned into "What's Your Country Song", accompanied by a backing band. This marked the first performance of either song and was praised by Andrew Unterberger of Billboard, who called it a "rocking performance". He performed the song as a musical guest for The Ellen DeGeneres Show on May 5, 2021.

== Critical reception ==
James Daykin of Lyric Magazine named "What's Your Country Song" as the best song on Country Again: Side A, calling it a "glorious, slick, smooth nod to the great country songs of the past" and favorably making a comparison to Old Dominion's "Song for Another Time", which similarly references the titles of classic songs. Madeline Christy, writing for Off the Record, praised the song's "nostalgic lyrics", and Madeline Crone of American Songwriter described it as a celebration of the country music community following a divisive year. Providing a mixed review for MusicRow, Robert K. Oermann characterized the song as an "anthem with an uplifting mood", but criticized the production and audio quality. In a less favorable review, a reviewer for the Shenzhen Daily called the song "nothing brand-new or earth shattering" compared to Rhett's previous work, but conceded that it is "simple, relatable, and enjoyable".

The song reached number one on the US Billboard Country Airplay and Hot Country Songs charts dated March 27, 2021, becoming Rhett's 16th number one single on the Country Airplay chart. The song was his second number one on the Hot Country Songs chart, following "Die a Happy Man" in 2015. It also peaked at number 29 on the US Billboard Hot 100, Rhett's highest position on the chart since "Die a Happy Man" reached number 21 in 2016. In April 2021, the Recording Industry Association of America (RIAA) certified the song gold for track-equivalent sales of 500,000 units in the United States. In Canada, "What's Your Country Song" reached number one on the Billboard Country chart dated March 6, 2021, and peaked at number 37 on the Billboard Canadian Hot 100. It was certified gold in the country by Music Canada (MC). In Australia, the song charted at number three on the Australian Country Hot 50, published by The Music Network.

== Music video ==
Rhett posted a brief clip of the music video for "What's Your Country Song" via social media on November 11, 2020, the day of the song's release. The full music video was released on Rhett's YouTube channel two days later. It was directed by TK McKamy, who directed many of Rhett's previous music videos, including "Crash and Burn", "Die a Happy Man", and "Marry Me". Rhett said that he wanted the music video to remind viewers of a familiar moment in their life and capture the feeling of listening to a nostalgic song.

The music video is composed of interspersed clips of a family living in the countryside, performing various activities including chasing chickens on a farm, attending a bonfire, and singing with friends. Part of the video was filmed during the homecoming football game at Blackman High School in Murfreesboro, Tennessee, featuring the school's football team and cheerleaders. The clips are intercut with shots of Rhett walking through a cornfield and playing guitar. The music video was produced with film grain quality video and an autumn color palette. The visual was nominated for Male Video of the Year at the 2021 CMT Music Awards.

== Credits and personnel ==
Credits are adapted from the liner notes of Country Again: Side A.

- Tyler Chiarelli – Dobro
- Paul Franklin – steel guitar
- Jesse Frasure – acoustic guitar, programming, synth bass
- Dann Huff – electric guitar, electric guitar solo, ganjo
- David Huff – programming
- Charlie Judge – keyboards, piano
- Chris Kimmerer – drums
- Justin Niebank – programming
- Josh Reedy – background vocals
- Thomas Rhett – lead vocals, background vocals
- Jimmie Lee Sloas – bass guitar
- Ilya Toshinsky – acoustic guitar
- Derek Wells – electric guitar

== Charts ==
=== Weekly charts ===
Weekly chart performance for "What's Your Country Song"
Chart (2020–2021)	Peak position
Australia Country Hot 50 (TMN)	3
Canada (Canadian Hot 100)	37
Canada Country (Billboard)	1
US Billboard Hot 100	29
US Country Airplay (Billboard)	1
US Hot Country Songs (Billboard)	1

=== Year-end charts ===
Year-end chart performance for "What's Your Country Song"
Chart (2021)	Position
Canada (Canadian Hot 100)	92
US Billboard Hot 100	80
US Country Airplay (Billboard)	3
US Hot Country Songs (Billboard)	13

== Certifications ==
Certifications and sales for "What's Your Country Song"
Region	Certification	Certified units/sales
Australia (ARIA)	Gold	35,000^{‡}
Canada (Music Canada)	Gold	40,000^{‡}
United States (RIAA)	2× Platinum	2,000,000^{‡}
^{‡} Sales+streaming figures based on certification alone.
