= Leave Right Now (Thomas Rhett song) =

Promotional single by Thomas Rhett

from the album Life Changes
- Released: April 13, 2018
- Genre: EDM; Pop rock
- Length: 3:16 (album version): 3:09 (radio edit)
- Label: Valory
- Songwriter(s): Thomas Rhett; Julian Bunetta; Edward Drewett; John Henry Ryan
- Producer(s): Thomas Rhett; Julian Bunetta

"Leave Right Now" is a song co-written and recorded by American country pop singer Thomas Rhett for his third studio album, Life Changes (2017). Inspired by trends in modern dance music, Rhett co-wrote the track with Edward Drewett, John Henry Ryan, and his co-producer, Julian Bunetta. An extended play featuring various remixes of the song was released April 13, 2018 through the Valory Music Group. "Leave Right Now" serves as the fifth promotional single for the album.

"Leave Right Now" has peaked at number 38 on the Billboard Hot Country Songs chart.

== Background and recording ==
"Leave Right Now" was written in Los Angeles, California and was originally intended as an acoustic country pop song. Rhett drew inspiration from electronic dance music, particularly the songs of the Chainsmokers, and proposed adding a drop after the chorus. He told media outlets when discussing the album's recording that he "never in a million years" expected the song to make it on the record as is because of its "progressive" sound, which he worried might be jarring to country music fans.

In April 2018, Valory Music Group commissioned a set of remixes for the song to serve as a promotional single, concurrent with the radio release of "Life Changes". The resulting extended play includes the original album version, a shortened radio edit, an EDM remix from Danish DJ Martin Jensen, and a stripped-down "Nashville mix."

== Composition ==
"Leave Right Now" combines influences of pop and electronic dance music, including a post-chorus drop, with honest, wistful lyrics and a more traditionally country narrative. Lyrically, the song revolves around a guy meeting a romantic interest at a party and suggesting that they leave early and get to know each other better in private. The song begins with acoustic guitar chords, which give way to slick electronic beats later on.

== Critical reception ==
The staff of Taste of Country praised Rhett's willingness to take a risk on the song, writing, that the song "push[es] the boundaries of country music further than" most artists. Markos Papadatos of Digital Journal described the song as "addicting" in a complimentary album review. Georgia Davis of The Post gave a more mixed review of the song, writing that it is "lyrically a treat," but that its sound feels out of place on the album.

== Commercial performance ==
Following the release of Life Changes, "Leave Right Now" entered the Hot Country Songs chart dated September 30, 2017 at number 38.

== Music video ==
Metro reported that an accompanying music video is being filmed for the song sometime in the spring of 2018. A statement from Rhett states that the video intends to "[play] around with the energy of the song" by speeding up and slowing down various scenes in time with the music for emphasis. Directed by Justin Clough and filmed at the Frist Art Museum in Nashville, Tennessee, the video premiered May 23, 2018. The video uses the audio of the Martin Jensen remix.

== Track listing ==
Leave Right Now: The Remixes
No.	Title	Length
1.	"Leave Right Now"	3:16
2.	"Leave Right Now" (radio edit)	3:09
3.	"Leave Right Now" (Martin Jensen mix)	2:42
4.	"Leave Right Now" (Nashville mix)	3:19
Total length:		12:26

== Charts ==
Chart (2017)	Peak position
US Hot Country Songs (Billboard)	38

== Certifications ==
Region	Certification	Certified units/sales
United States (RIAA)	Gold	500,000^{‡}
^{‡} Sales+streaming figures based on certification alone.
