= Tyminski =

Tyminski or Tymiński (feminine: Tymińska; plural: Tymińscy) is a surname. Notable people with the surname include:

- Dan Tyminski (born 1967), American musician
- Karolina Tymińska (born 1984), Polish heptathlete
- Łukasz Tymiński (born 1990), Polish footballer
- Stanisław Tymiński (born 1948), Polish-Canadian businessman
- Zbigniew Tymiński (born 1955), Polish football manager
