= Merry Christmas, Y'all =

EP by Thomas Rhett
- Released: October 21, 2022
- Genre: Christmas; country
- Length: 12:08
- Label: Valory
- Producer: Dann Huff

Thomas Rhett chronology
Where We Started (2022)	Merry Christmas, Y'all (2022)	20 Number Ones (2023)

Merry Christmas, Y'all is the second EP and first Christmas album from American country singer Thomas Rhett. It was released through Valory on October 21, 2022, includes four Christmas standards covers.

== Background ==
On October 20, 2022, without any previous implications, Rhett took to his social media accounts to announce the EP. Rhett said about the EP, "I wanted to record some of the Christmas songs that my family and I enjoy every year." All songs on the EP are arranged in Rhett's country style.

== Track listing ==
Stand Alone track listing
No.	Title	Writer(s)	Length
1.	"Winter Wonderland"	Felix Bernard; Richard B. Smith	2:37
2.	"It's the Most Wonderful Time of the Year"	Edward Pola; George Wyle	2:56
3.	"Have Yourself a Merry Little Christmas"	Hugh Martin; Ralph Blane	4:13
4.	"It's Beginning to Look a Lot Like Christmas"	Meredith Willson	2:21
Total length:			12:08

== Charts ==
Chart performance for Merry Christmas, Y'all
Chart (2022)	Peak position
US Top Holiday Albums (Billboard)	22
