= Be a Light =

2020 single by various artists

Single by Thomas Rhett featuring Reba McEntire, Hillary Scott, Chris Tomlin, and Keith Urban

from the album 20 Number Ones
- Released: March 30, 2020
- Genre: Country
- Length: 2:50
- Label: Valory
- Songwriters: Thomas Rhett; Matt Dragstrem; Josh Miller; Josh Thompson
- Producer: Dann Huff

Thomas Rhett singles chronology
"Beer Can't Fix" (2020)	"Be a Light" (2020)	"What's Your Country Song" (2020)

Reba McEntire singles chronology
"Freedom" (2019)	"Be a Light" (2020)	"Does He Love You" (2021)

Hillary Scott singles chronology
"Still" (2017)	"Be a Light" (2020)

Chris Tomlin singles chronology
"Christmas Day" (2019)	"Be a Light" (2020)	"Who You Are to Me" (2020)

Keith Urban singles chronology
"God Whispered Your Name" (2020)	"Be a Light" (2020)	"Polaroid" (2020)

"Be a Light" is a song recorded by American country music singer Thomas Rhett and featuring guest vocals from Reba McEntire, Hillary Scott, Chris Tomlin, and Keith Urban. It was released on March 30, 2020.

Rhett performed the song live at the 54th Annual Country Music Association Awards alongside McEntire and Tomlin for the first time.

== Content and history ==
Rhett said that he wrote the song in 2019, but chose to release it because he thought its message would be well received in the wake of the COVID-19 pandemic. He told Billboard that the song "was really just about being a light in a dark place; being an encouragement to people." He co-wrote the song with Matt Dragstrem, Josh Thompson, and Josh Miller. The song was sent to country radio on March 30, 2020. On April 5, 2020, he performed it on ACM Presents: Our Country, a television special put on by the Academy of Country Music. Rhett also announced that proceeds from the song will be donated to the MusiCares COVID-19 Relief Fund.

== Personnel ==
Credits by AllMusic

- David Angell – violin
- Monisa Angell – viola
- Jenny Bufano – violin
- Zeneba Bowers – violin
- Janet Darnall – violin
- David Davidson – violin
- Matt Dragstrem – programming
- Conni Ellisor – violin
- Alicia Engstrom – violin
- Dann Huff – electric guitar, piano, programming
- Charlie Judge – keyboards, piano
- Chris Kimmerer – drums
- Anthony LaMarchina – cello
- Betsy Lamb – viola
- Tony Lucido – bass guitar
- Reba McEntire – featured vocals
- Carole Rabinowitz-Nueun – cello
- Justin Niebank – programming
- Sari Reist – cello
- Thomas Rhett – lead vocals
- Hillary Scott – featured vocals
- Chris Tomlin – featured vocals
- Ilya Toshinsky – acoustic guitar
- Keith Urban – electric guitar, featured vocals
- Mary Kathryn Van Osdale – violin
- Derek Wells – electric guitar
- Kris Wilkinson – viola, string arrangements

== Chart performance ==
Be a Light entered the US Billboard Hot 100 at number 71 on the chart dated for the week ending April 18, 2020. In doing so, it became the first entries on that chart for both Scott and Tomlin (though the former has charted repeatedly with Lady A). It is also McEntire's first top-10 hit since "Turn On the Radio" peaked at No. 1 in January 2011, and her most recent top-10 hit to date. With a peak of number 2 on the Billboard Country Airplay chart, it became Rhett's first single to miss the top spot since "Vacation" peaked at number 30 in 2016.

== Charts ==
=== Weekly charts ===
Chart (2020)	Peak position
Canada Hot 100 (Billboard)	74
Canada Country (Billboard)	3
US Billboard Hot 100	42
US Country Airplay (Billboard)	2
US Hot Country Songs (Billboard)	7
US Rolling Stone Top 100	91

=== Year-end charts ===
Chart (2020)	Position
US Country Airplay (Billboard)	31
US Hot Country Songs (Billboard)	24

== Certifications ==
Region	Certification	Certified units/sales
United States (RIAA)	Platinum	1,000,000^{‡}
^{‡} Sales+streaming figures based on certification alone.
