= Remember You Young =

Single by Thomas Rhett

from the album Center Point Road
- Released: July 15, 2019
- Genre: Country
- Length: 3:00
- Label: Big Machine
- Songwriters: Thomas Rhett; Ashley Gorley; Jesse Frasure
- Producers: Dann Huff; Jesse Frasure; Thomas Rhett

Thomas Rhett singles chronology
| "Look What God Gave Her" (2019) | "Remember You Young" (2019) | "Beer Can't Fix" (2020) |

Music video
- "Remember You Young" on YouTube

"Remember You Young" is a song co-written and recorded by American country music singer Thomas Rhett. It was released on July 15, 2019 as the second single from his fourth studio album Center Point Road. Rhett wrote the song with Ashley Gorley and Jesse Frasure, the latter of which produced it with Dann Huff.

== History ==
Rhett says that the song carries a theme of nostalgia, and references to his wife and children. It also contains references to events from his past. He said that "We wrote this song about the people in life that we love, and always remembering them in their youth, no matter how much time passes and we all change." The song's accompanying music video features a group of elderly people who reminisce on their lives.

== Commercial performance ==
"Remember You Young" reached No. 1 on Billboard's Country Airplay chart on chart dated December 21, 2019, becoming Rhett's eighth consecutive No. 1 single and his fourteenth overall. The song has sold 143,000 copies in the United States as of February 2020.

== Music video ==
The music video was directed by TK McKamy and premiered on CMT, GAC & Vevo in 2019.

It was filmed partly on the property of session and touring bassist Todd Ashburn in the Nashville area.

The video is a sequel to the Marry Me music video. In addition to showing Rhett performing the song barefoot in a room full of mirrors, the video centers on Sam, now in his elderly years, goes about his daily routine while remembering moments of his time with Ellie, who is deceased as referred to by the ending shot of him holding an urn.

== Personnel ==
Credits are adapted from the liner notes of Center Point Road.

- Thomas Rhett – lead vocals, background vocals, producer
- Joe Baldridge – recording
- Dave Cohen – keyboards
- Josh Ditty – assistant recording
- Jesse Frasure – producer, programming
- Charlie Judge – cello
- Dann Huff – producer, electric guitar
- David Huff – digital editing, programming
- Chris Kimmerer – drums
- Jason Mott – assistant recording
- Justin Niebank – mixing
- Adam Nyan – mastering
- Jimmie Lee Sloas – bass
- Chris Small – digital editing
- Russell Terrell – background vocals
- Ilya Toshinskiy – acoustic guitar
- Derek Wells – electric guitar

== Charts ==
=== Weekly charts ===
| Chart (2019–2020) | Peak position |
|---|---|
| Canada Hot 100 (Billboard) | 75 |
| Canada Country (Billboard) | 1 |
| US Billboard Hot 100 | 53 |
| US Country Airplay (Billboard) | 1 |
| US Hot Country Songs (Billboard) | 5 |

=== Year-end charts ===
| Chart (2019) | Position |
|---|---|
| US Country Airplay (Billboard) | 55 |
| US Hot Country Songs (Billboard) | 66 |

| Chart (2020) | Position |
|---|---|
| US Country Airplay (Billboard) | 49 |
| US Hot Country Songs (Billboard) | 64 |

== Certifications ==
| Region | Certification | Certified units/sales |
|---|---|---|
| United States (RIAA) | Platinum | 1,000,000^{‡} |
^{‡} Sales+streaming figures based on certification alone.
