= Beer Can't Fix =

Single by Thomas Rhett featuring Jon Pardi

from the album Center Point Road
- Released: January 6, 2020
- Genre: Country
- Length: 3:29
- Label: Valory; Capitol Nashville
- Songwriter(s): Thomas Rhett; Julian Bunetta; Ryan Tedder; Zach Skelton
- Producer(s): Thomas Rhett; Julian Bunetta; Dann Huff

Thomas Rhett singles chronology
"Remember You Young" (2019)	"Beer Can't Fix" (2020)	"Be a Light" (2020)

Jon Pardi singles chronology
"Heartache Medication" (2019)	"Beer Can't Fix" (2020)	"Ain't Always the Cowboy" (2020)

Music videos
- "Beer Can't Fix" on YouTube
- "Beer Can't Fix" (Lyric Video) on YouTube

"Beer Can't Fix" is a song recorded by American country music singer-songwriters Thomas Rhett and Jon Pardi. It was released to country radio on January 6, 2020 as the third single from Rhett's fourth studio album Center Point Road (2019). The song's thesis is that, regardless of the nature of one's life problems, beer is always the answer. Rhett wrote the song with Julian Bunetta, Ryan Tedder, and Zach Skelton.

== Music video ==
Released in March 2020, the song's music video was directed by Shaun Silva. It features the two singers performing the song together in Key West, Florida.

== Commercial performance ==
"Beer Can't Fix" became Rhett's fifteenth (and ninth consecutive) number-one hit and Pardi's fourth on the Billboard Country Airplay chart dated May 16, 2020. It has reached number six on the Hot Country Songs chart. It has also reached number 36 on the Hot 100, giving Rhett his eighth top 40 hit and Pardi his second on that chart. The song achieved similar prominence in Canada, giving Rhett his twelfth (and ninth consecutive) number-one hit and Pardi his fourth on the Canada Country chart. It also reached number 45 on the Canadian Hot 100 chart.

== Charts ==
=== Weekly charts ===
Chart (2020)	Peak position
Australia Country Hot 50 (TMN)	3
Canada (Canadian Hot 100)	45
Canada Country (Billboard)	1
US Billboard Hot 100	36
US Country Airplay (Billboard)	1
US Hot Country Songs (Billboard)	6

=== Year-end charts ===
Chart (2020)	Position
US Country Airplay (Billboard)	21
US Hot Country Songs (Billboard)	26

== Certifications ==
Region	Certification	Certified units/sales
Australia (ARIA)	Gold	35,000^{‡}
Canada (Music Canada)	Platinum	80,000^{‡}
United States (RIAA)	Platinum	1,000,000^{‡}
^{‡} Sales+streaming figures based on certification alone.
