= Unforgettable (Thomas Rhett song) =

Single by Thomas Rhett

from the album Life Changes
- Released: July 28, 2017
- Recorded: 2017
- Genre: Country pop
- Length: 2:37 (album version); 2:34 (radio mix)
- Label: Valory
- Songwriter(s): Thomas Rhett; Jesse Frasure; Ashley Gorley; Shane McAnally
- Producer(s): Dann Huff; Jesse Frasure; Thomas Rhett

Thomas Rhett singles chronology
"Craving You" (2017)	"Unforgettable" (2017)	"Marry Me" (2017)

"Unforgettable" is a song recorded by American country music singer Thomas Rhett. It was released to country radio on July 28, 2017 via Valory Music Group as the second single from his third studio album, Life Changes (2017). The song was written by Rhett, Jesse Frasure, Ashley Gorley and Shane McAnally.

== Content ==
Rolling Stone said that the song "examines a day at the start of a relationship from the vantage of its more mature present day." It features details about the narrator meeting his lover for the first time.

== Videos ==
A lyric video was first released in July 2017, featuring Rhett performing in concert as well as video clips of him and his wife Lauren. A music video of a live performance at CMA Awards directed by Paul Miller premiered on CMT, GAC, and Vevo in November 2017.

== Critical reception ==
American Songwriter and Taste of Country both ranked the song number five on their lists of the greatest Thomas Rhett songs.

== Commercial performance ==
"Unforgettable" debuted at No. 33 on the Billboard's Country Airplay chart of August 12, 2017. The song was then released for sale, and it charted at No. 13 on the Hot Country Songs (chart date August 19, 2017), with 29,000 copies sold in the first week. The song has sold 293,000 copies in the United States as of February 2018.

== Charts ==
Chart (2017–2018)	Peak position
Canada (Canadian Hot 100)	51
Canada Country (Billboard)	1
US Billboard Hot 100	47
US Country Airplay (Billboard)	1
US Hot Country Songs (Billboard)	4

=== Year-end charts ===
Chart (2017)	Position
US Billboard Country Airplay	42
US Billboard Hot Country Songs	22

Chart (2018)	Position
US Hot Country Songs (Billboard)	58

== Certifications ==
Region	Certification	Certified units/sales
Australia (ARIA)	Platinum	70,000^{‡}
Canada (Music Canada)	Platinum	80,000^{‡}
United States (RIAA)	2× Platinum	2,000,000^{‡}
^{‡} Sales+streaming figures based on certification alone.
