= Look What God Gave Her =

Single by Thomas Rhett

from the album Center Point Road
- Released: March 1, 2019
- Genre: Country pop
- Length: 2:48
- Label: Valory
- Songwriter(s): Thomas Rhett; Rhett Akins; Julian Bunetta; John Ryan; Jacob Kasher; Ammar Malik
- Producer(s): Dann Huff; Julian Bunetta; Thomas Rhett

Thomas Rhett singles chronology
"Sixteen" (2018)	"Look What God Gave Her" (2019)	"Remember You Young" (2019)

"Look What God Gave Her" is a song recorded by American country music singer Thomas Rhett. He wrote the song with his father Rhett Akins, Julian Bunetta, John Ryan, Jacob Kasher, and Ammar Malik, and co-produced it with Dann Huff and Bunetta. It is the first single from Rhett's fourth studio album, Center Point Road.

== Commercial performance ==
The song was released for download on February 28, 2019. It was the best-selling country digital song of the week with 19,000 copies sold in its first week, which moved the song up to number 5 from 35 on Hot Country Songs chart dated March 16, 2019. It was certified Gold by the RIAA for 500,000 units in combined sales and streams on October 9, 2019, and has sold 210,000 copies as of December 2019. By August 2021, it was certified 2× Platinum for sales of an equivalent of 2,000,000 units.

== Critical reception ==
American Songwriter and Taste of Country both ranked the song number seven on their lists of the greatest Thomas Rhett songs.

== Music video ==
The music video was released on April 6, 2019 and directed by T.K. McKamy. Thomas Rhett's inspiration for the song was his wife, Lauren Atkins, who joins him in the video. His two daughters, Willa Gray and Ada James, also make an "unplanned cameo". In an interview Rhett said he wants the video to "highlight amazing women in Nashville for all of the amazing things they've done around the world". Among those featured are women from Nashville's Thistle Farms as well as the founder of Love + One.

== Charts ==
=== Weekly charts ===
Chart (2019)	Peak position
Canada (Canadian Hot 100)	33
Canada Country (Billboard)	1
US Billboard Hot 100	32
US Adult Pop Airplay (Billboard)	15
US Country Airplay (Billboard)	1
US Hot Country Songs (Billboard)	3
US Rolling Stone Top 100	36

=== Year-end charts ===
Chart (2019)	Position
Canada (Canadian Hot 100)	90
US Billboard Hot 100	85
US Country Airplay (Billboard)	41
US Hot Country Songs (Billboard)	11

== Certifications ==
Region	Certification	Certified units/sales
Australia (ARIA)	Platinum	70,000^{‡}
United States (RIAA)	2× Platinum	2,000,000^{‡}
^{‡} Sales+streaming figures based on certification alone.
