= Craving You =

Single by Thomas Rhett featuring Maren Morris

from the album Life Changes
- Released: April 3, 2017
- Recorded: 2017
- Genre: Pop
- Length: 3:44 (single version); 3:42; (album version)
- Label: Valory
- Songwriters: Dave Barnes; Julian Bunetta
- Producers: Dann Huff; Julian Bunetta; Joe London; Thomas Rhett

Thomas Rhett singles chronology
"Star of the Show" (2016)	"Craving You" (2017)	"Unforgettable" (2017)

Maren Morris singles chronology
"I Could Use a Love Song" (2017)	"Craving You" (2017)	"The Middle" (2018)

Music video
- "Craving You" on YouTube

"Craving You" is a song by American singers Thomas Rhett and Maren Morris, who appears as a featured artist. It was released to country radio on April 3, 2017, via Valory Music Group, as the lead single from Rhett's third studio album, Life Changes. The song was written by Dave Barnes and Julian Bunetta.

== Background and release ==
Rhett was originally scheduled to co-write the song with David Barnes and Julian Bunetta, however, he was sick on the day and was therefore absent at the writing session. Bunetta then send Rhett a demo the next day, and Rhett said he was "blown away by the longing-ness of the story".

Maren Morris contributed vocals on the song and recorded her parts in an hour. However, it was not decided whether her vocals would be used until later as Rhett thought the song may not be "really a duet song". His producer then sent him a version with just his vocal, and then another version with Morris on it; Rhett said: "I think me and my wife and my team were just collectively like 'Wow, she adds such a crazy element to the song.'" "Craving You" was released on April 3, 2017, as the lead single of Rhett's third studio album, Life Changes.

== Composition ==
Written by Dave Barnes and Julian Bunetta, "Craving You" was written in the key of A minor, with Rhett's and Morris's vocals spanning from C3 to E5. A pop song, it contains elements of country and R&B.

== Commercial performance ==
"Craving You" reached No. 1 on the Country Airplay chart dated July 22, 2017, becoming Rhett's eighth number one single on that chart, and Morris's first. The song was certified three-times Platinum by the RIAA on November 14, 2023, and it has sold 384,000 copies in the United States as of October 2017.

== Music video ==
The official music video was directed by TK McKamy, and premiered on GQ on March 31, 2017, while it premiered on CMT, GAC, and Vevo on May 2, 2017. It is presented as a movie trailer for a crime thriller involving a bank heist, with Morris playing a bank robber and Rhett playing an undercover cop.

== Charts ==
Chart (2017)	Peak position
Canada Hot 100 (Billboard)	61
Canada Country (Billboard)	1
US Billboard Hot 100	39
US Country Airplay (Billboard)	1
US Hot Country Songs (Billboard)	3

=== Year-end charts ===
Chart (2017)	Position
Canada Country (Billboard)	11
US Country Airplay (Billboard)	11
US Hot Country Songs (Billboard)	8
US Radio Songs (Billboard)	71

== Certifications ==
Region	Certification	Certified units/sales
Australia (ARIA)	Gold	35,000^{‡}
United States (RIAA)	3× Platinum	3,000,000^{‡}
^{‡} Sales+streaming figures based on certification alone.
