= Sixteen (Thomas Rhett song) =

Single by Thomas Rhett

from the album Life Changes
- Released: October 1, 2018
- Genre: Country
- Length: 2:58
- Label: Valory
- Songwriter(s): Thomas Rhett; Sean Douglas; Joe Spargur
- Producer(s): Dann Huff; Jesse Frasure; Thomas Rhett

Thomas Rhett singles chronology
"Goodbye Summer" (2018)	"Sixteen" (2018)	"Look What God Gave Her" (2019)

"Sixteen" is a song recorded by American country music singer Thomas Rhett. He wrote the song with Sean Douglas and Joe Spargur, and co-produced it with Dann Huff and Jesse Frasure. It is the fifth single from Rhett's third studio album, Life Changes.

== Content ==
The song is a look at biographical milestones in the male narrator's life, focusing particularly on those occurring at the age of sixteen, eighteen, twenty-one and twenty-five. In each verse, the narrator is at a certain point in his life, wishing to be slightly older. Rhett said that he wrote the song when he was 25, and that it was one of the first he wrote for the Life Changes album. He also said that it was integral to the formation of the album, telling The Boot that "It was the first one that I really fell in love with. Then, I started to get in a room with [my co-writers for the album], and we really just started to shape Life Changes around all these different vibes, to make sure it was all really cohesive but every song still sounded fresh."

== Commercial performance ==
The song reached number one on Billboard's Country Airplay chart dated January 26, 2019. It has sold 108,000 copies in the United States as of March 2019.

== Charts ==
=== Weekly charts ===
Chart (2018–2019)	Peak position
Canada (Canadian Hot 100)	71
Canada Country (Billboard)	1
US Billboard Hot 100	42
US Country Airplay (Billboard)	1
US Hot Country Songs (Billboard)	6

=== Year-end charts ===
Chart (2019)	Position
US Country Airplay (Billboard)	37
US Hot Country Songs (Billboard)	56

== Certifications ==
Region	Certification	Certified units/sales
Australia (ARIA)	Gold	35,000^{‡}
United States (RIAA)	Platinum	1,000,000^{‡}
^{‡} Sales+streaming figures based on certification alone.
