= Life Changes (Thomas Rhett album) =

Studio album by Thomas Rhett
- Released: September 8, 2017
- Recorded: 2017
- Studios: Blackbird Studio, Sound Stage Studios, Rhythm House and RTBGV (Nashville, Tennessee); Hound's Ear Studios (Franklin, Tennessee); Enemy Dojo Studios (Calabasas, California); MixStar Studios (Virginia Beach, Virginia); Sarm Music Village and Echo Beach Management (London, UK)
- Genres: Country pop; pop rock
- Length: 46:28
- Label: Valory
- Producers: Thomas Rhett; Dann Huff; Jesse Frasure; Julian Bunetta; Joe London

Thomas Rhett chronology
Tangled Up (2015)	Life Changes (2017)	Center Point Road (2019)

Singles from Life Changes
- 1. "Craving You" Released: April 3, 2017; 2. "Unforgettable" Released: July 28, 2017; 3. "Marry Me" Released: November 20, 2017; 4. "Life Changes" Released: April 16, 2018; 5. "Sixteen" Released: October 1, 2018

Professional ratings
Review scores
Source	Rating
AllMusic	4/5 stars

Life Changes is the third studio album by American country pop singer Thomas Rhett. Released on September 8, 2017, through Valory Music Group, Rhett produced the album alongside Dann Huff, Jesse Frasure, Julian Bunetta, and Joe London. It includes the chart-topping singles "Craving You" with Maren Morris, and "Unforgettable". The album debuted at No. 1 with 123,000 album-equivalent units, giving Rhett his first number one album on the Billboard 200.

== Singles ==
"Craving You", a duet with Maren Morris, was released digitally on March 31, 2017, as the record's lead single. It was promoted to country radio on April 3, 2017. The song hit number one on both the US Country Airplay chart and the Canada Country chart. The second single, "Unforgettable", was released to radio on July 28, 2017. "Marry Me" was released to radio on November 20, 2017, as the album's third single.

The title track was released to radio April 9, 2018, as the fourth single.

=== Promotional singles ===
A promotional single, "Sixteen", was released on August 11, 2017. A second promotional single, "Grave", was released on August 18, 2017. The title track was released as the third promotional single on September 1, 2017.

Rhett released a song, titled "Sweetheart", exclusively to Billboard on September 7, a day ahead of the release of the album. A remix extended play for the track "Leave Right Now" was released April 13, 2018, as the album's fifth promotional single.

== Commercial performance ==
Life Changes debuted at number one on the Billboard 200, giving Rhett his first chart-topping album. It sold 94,000 copies in the first week (with 123,000 album-equivalent units total), Rhett's best sales and units week. The album is also the first country album to top the Billboard 200 chart in 2017. It sold a further 20,400 copies in its second week. The album was certified Platinum by the RIAA for a million units in sales and streams on September 6, 2018. It has sold 319,600 copies in the United States as of March 2019.

== Track listing ==
Life Changes
No.	Title	Writer(s)	Producer(s)	Length
1.	"Craving You" (featuring Maren Morris)	Dave Barnes; Julian Bunetta	Rhett; Bunetta; Joe London; Dann Huff	3:43
2.	"Unforgettable"	Thomas Rhett; Jesse Frasure; Ashley Gorley; Shane McAnally	Rhett; Huff; Frasure	2:37
3.	"Sixteen"	Rhett; Sean Douglas; Joe Spargur	Rhett; Huff; Frasure	2:58
4.	"Drink a Little Beer" (featuring Rhett Akins)	Rhett Akins; Frasure; Ben Hayslip	Rhett; Huff; Frasure	3:34
5.	"Marry Me"	Rhett; Frasure; Gorley; McAnally	Rhett; Huff; Frasure	3:26
6.	"Leave Right Now"	Rhett; Bunetta; Edward Drewett; John Henry Ryan	Rhett; Bunetta	3:16
7.	"Smooth Like the Summer"	Rhett; Frasure; McAnally; Josh Osborne	Rhett; Huff; Frasure	2:48
8.	"Life Changes"	Rhett; Akins; Frasure; Gorley	Rhett; Huff; Frasure	3:10
9.	"When You Look Like That"	Jessi Alexander; Matt Dragstrem; David Lee Murphy	Rhett; Huff; Frasure	3:23
10.	"Sweetheart"	Rhett; Akins; Boggs; Douglas; Spargur	Rhett; Huff; Bunetta; London	3:26
11.	"Kiss Me Like a Stranger"	Rhett; Barnes; Jordan Reynolds	Rhett; Huff; Bunetta; London	3:47
12.	"Renegades"	Rhett; Bunetta; Ryan	Rhett; Huff; Bunetta; London	3:43
13.	"Gateway Love"	Rhett; Douglas; Sam Ellis; Emily Weisband	Rhett; Huff; Bunetta; London	3:26
14.	"Grave"	Chris DeStefano; Hillary Lindsey; Josh Miller	Rhett; Huff; Frasure	3:11
Total length:				46:28

Deluxe Edition (CD)
No.	Title	Writer(s)	Producer(s)	Length
15.	"Country Gold"	Rhett; Akins; Frasure; Gorley	Rhett; Huff; Frasure	3:50
16.	"Cardboard Heart"	Rhett; Akins; Douglas; Frasure	Rhett; Huff; Frasure	2:46
17.	"When We're 80"	Rhett; Frasure; McAnally; Osborne	Rhett; Huff; Frasure	2:57
Total length:				56:01

Deluxe Edition (Digital/Streaming only)
No.	Title	Length
18.	"Life Changes" (radio edit)	3:11
19.	"Leave Right Now" (Martin Jensen mix)	2:42
20.	"Leave Right Now" (Nashville mix)	3:19
21.	"Leave Right Now" (radio edit)	3:09
Total length:		68:22

== Personnel ==
Musicians

- Thomas Rhett – lead vocals, backing vocals (6)
- Charlie Judge – keyboards (1–4, 7–14), synthesizers (5), strings (5)
- Julian Bunetta – keyboards (1, 6, 10, 13), programming (1, 6, 10, 11, 12), electric guitar (1, 10, 13), guitars (6), drums (6), backing vocals (6)
- Joe London – programming (1, 10–13), keyboards (10, 13), electric guitar (10, 12)
- Jesse Frasure – programming (2–5, 7, 8, 9, 14)
- John Ryan – programming (6)
- Matt Dragstrem – programming (9), backing vocals (9)
- Sam Ellis – keyboards (13), programming (13)
- Dann Huff – electric guitar (1–5, 7–14), ganjo (1), mandolin (1)
- Derek Wells – electric guitar (1–5, 7–14)
- Danny Rader – acoustic guitar (1, 10–13)
- Ilya Toshinsky – acoustic guitar (2–9, 14)
- Paul Franklin – steel guitar (2, 9, 13)
- Skip Edwards – steel guitar (10)
- Jimmie Lee Sloas – bass (1–5, 7–14)
- Chris Kimmerer – drums (1–5, 7–14)
- Stuart Duncan – fiddle (4)
- Tom Peyton – trombone (11)
- Nate Mercereau – French horn (11)
- Maren Morris – lead and harmony vocals (1)
- Russell Terrell – backing vocals (1–4, 7, 8, 10, 13)
- Rhett Akins – lead and backing vocals (4)
- Jessi Alexander – backing vocals (9)
- David Lee Murphy – backing vocals (9)
- Dave Barnes – backing vocals (11)
- Ben Caver – backing vocals (11, 12)
- Jordan Reynolds – backing vocals (11)
- Emily Weisband – backing vocals (13)
- Bob Bailey – backing vocals (14)
- Jason Eskridge – backing vocals (14)
- Vicki Hampton – backing vocals (14)
- Wendy Moten – backing vocals (14)

Technical and design

- Joe Baldridge – recording (1–5, 7–14)
- Julian Bunetta – additional recording (1, 10), recording (6)
- Joe London – additional recording (1, 10)
- Jesse Frasure – additional recording (2–5, 8, 9)
- Russell Terrell – additional recording (2, 3, 7, 8, 10, 11, 13)
- Seth Morton – recording assistant (1–5, 7–14), additional recording (14)
- Kam Luchterhand – recording assistant (7, 14)
- John Hanes – mix engineer (1)
- Serban Ghenea – mixing (1)
- Justin Niebank – mixing (2–5, 7, 8, 9, 11–14)
- Ash Howes – mixing (6, 10)
- Chris Small – digital editing (1–5, 7, 8, 9, 11, 13, 14)
- Adam Ayan – mastering at Gateway Mastering (Portland, Maine)
- Mike "Frog" Griffith – production coordinator
- Laurel Kittleson – production coordinator
- Janice Soled – production coordinator
- Brianna Steinitz – production coordinator
- Becky Reiser – art direction, graphics
- Sandi Spika Borchetta – art direction
- John Shearer – photography

== Awards ==
Year	Association	Category	Result
2018	Grammy Awards	Best Country Album	Nominated
2018	CMA Awards	Album of the Year	Nominated

== Charts ==
=== Weekly charts ===
Chart (2017)	Peak position
Australian Albums (ARIA)	30
Canadian Albums (Billboard)	2
New Zealand Heatseeker Albums (RMNZ)	3
Scottish Albums (Official Charts)	26
UK Albums (Official Charts)	54
UK Country Albums (Official Charts)	2
US Billboard 200	1
US Top Country Albums (Billboard)	1

=== Year-end charts ===
Chart (2017)	Position
US Billboard 200	123
US Top Country Albums (Billboard)	17

Chart (2018)	Position
Australian Country Albums (ARIA)	34
Canadian Albums (Billboard)	41
US Billboard 200	41
US Top Country Albums (Billboard)	5

Chart (2019)	Position
Australian Country Albums (ARIA)	19
US Billboard 200	106
US Top Country Albums (Billboard)	9

Chart (2020)	Position
US Top Country Albums (Billboard)	38

Chart (2021)	Position
Australian Country Albums (ARIA)	46

=== Decade-end charts ===
Chart (2010–2019)	Position
US Top Country Albums (Billboard)	30

== Certifications ==
Region	Certification	Certified units/sales
Canada (Music Canada)	Platinum	80,000^{‡}
United States (RIAA)	Platinum	1,000,000^{‡}
^{‡} Sales+streaming figures based on certification alone.
