= Life Changes (Thomas Rhett song) =

Single by Thomas Rhett

from the album Life Changes
- Released: April 16, 2018
- Recorded: 2017
- Genre: Country pop
- Length: 3:10
- Label: Valory
- Songwriter(s): Thomas Rhett; Rhett Akins; Ashley Gorley; Jesse Frasure
- Producer(s): Dann Huff; Jesse Frasure; Thomas Rhett

Thomas Rhett singles chronology
| "Marry Me" (2017) | "Life Changes" (2018) | "Goodbye Summer" (2018) |

Music video
- "Life Changes" on YouTube

"Life Changes" is a song recorded by American country music singer Thomas Rhett. It was released to country radio on April 16, 2018, via Valory Music Group as the fourth single from his third studio album, Life Changes (2017). The song was written by Rhett, along with his father Rhett Akins, Ashley Gorley and Jesse Frasure.

== Background ==
"Life Changes" was released as the fourth single on Rhett's third studio album, Life Changes, on April 16, 2018. The song was originally released as the third promotional single for the album.

Rhett discussed the autobiographical song with Taste of Country:

"It covers my college years, marrying Lauren, becoming a dad and the evolution of my music career. It's definitely the most personal song I've ever written, but we all go through a lot in life whatever the story is, so I think the sentiment is something a lot of people can relate to."

The song is covered with "slick production and Rhett's slowed talking/singing style." He speaks about how his life has evolved over the years of his life and how he would never want a thing to change.

The radio edit features a lyric change reflecting the birth of Ada James. The line in the third verse where Rhett sings, "Now Lauren's showing, got one on the way" is altered to "Now there's Willa, and sweet Ada James." It was featured on the digital deluxe edition of the album of the same name and his first compilation album 20 Number Ones (2023).

== Commercial performance ==
The song has sold 189,000 copies in the United States as of October 2018.

== Music video ==
A static video with the original lyrics was released on August 31, 2017. The official music video with the radio edit lyrics was released on July 10, 2018. The video features his wife Lauren and two daughters Willa and Ada James on tour, along with him performing with his band on stage.

== Charts ==
=== Weekly charts ===
| Chart (2018) | Peak position |
|---|---|
| Canada (Canadian Hot 100) | 62 |
| Canada Country (Billboard) | 1 |
| US Billboard Hot 100 | 36 |
| US Country Airplay (Billboard) | 1 |
| US Hot Country Songs (Billboard) | 6 |

=== Year-end charts ===
| Chart (2018) | Position |
|---|---|
| US Country Airplay (Billboard) | 15 |
| US Hot Country Songs (Billboard) | 25 |

== Certifications ==
| Region | Certification | Certified units/sales |
|---|---|---|
| Australia (ARIA) | Gold | 35,000^{‡} |
| United States (RIAA) | Platinum | 1,000,000^{‡} |
^{‡} Sales+streaming figures based on certification alone.
