= Thomas Rhett =

American country singer (born 1990)

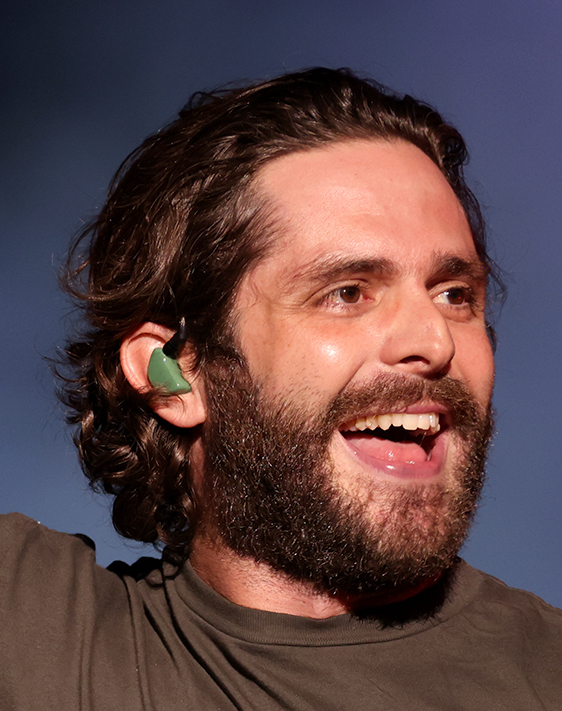
- Rhett in 2021

Background information
- Born: Thomas Rhett Akins Jr. March 30, 1990 (age 36); Valdosta, Georgia, U.S.
- Origin: Nashville, Tennessee, U.S.
- Genre: Country
- Occupation: Singer-songwriter
- Instruments: Vocals; guitar
- Years active: 2010–present
- Label: Valory/Big Machine
- Spouse: Lauren Akins (m. 2012)
- Website: thomasrhett.com

Thomas Rhett Akins Jr. (born March 30, 1990) is an American singer-songwriter. He is the oldest son of singer Rhett Akins.

Rhett has released seven studio albums for Big Machine Records' Valory Music imprint: It Goes Like This (2013), Tangled Up (2015), Life Changes (2017), Center Point Road (2019), Country Again: Side A (2021), Where We Started (2022) and About a Woman (2024). He has received four Grammy Award nominations with two albums being nominated for Best Country Album in 2017 and 2019.

His six albums have produced 21 singles on the Billboard Hot Country and Country Airplay charts, with 20 reaching the No. 1 position on the latter: "It Goes Like This", "Get Me Some of That", "Make Me Wanna", "Crash and Burn", "Die a Happy Man", "T-Shirt", "Star of the Show", "Craving You", "Unforgettable", "Marry Me", "Life Changes", "Sixteen", "Remember You Young", "Look What God Gave Her", "Beer Can't Fix", "What's Your Country Song", "Country Again", "Half of Me", "Angels (Don't Always Have Wings)", and "Mamaw's House".

In addition to much of his own material, Rhett has written singles for Jason Aldean, Lee Brice, Florida Georgia Line, LoCash, and Michael Ray, among others.

== Early life ==
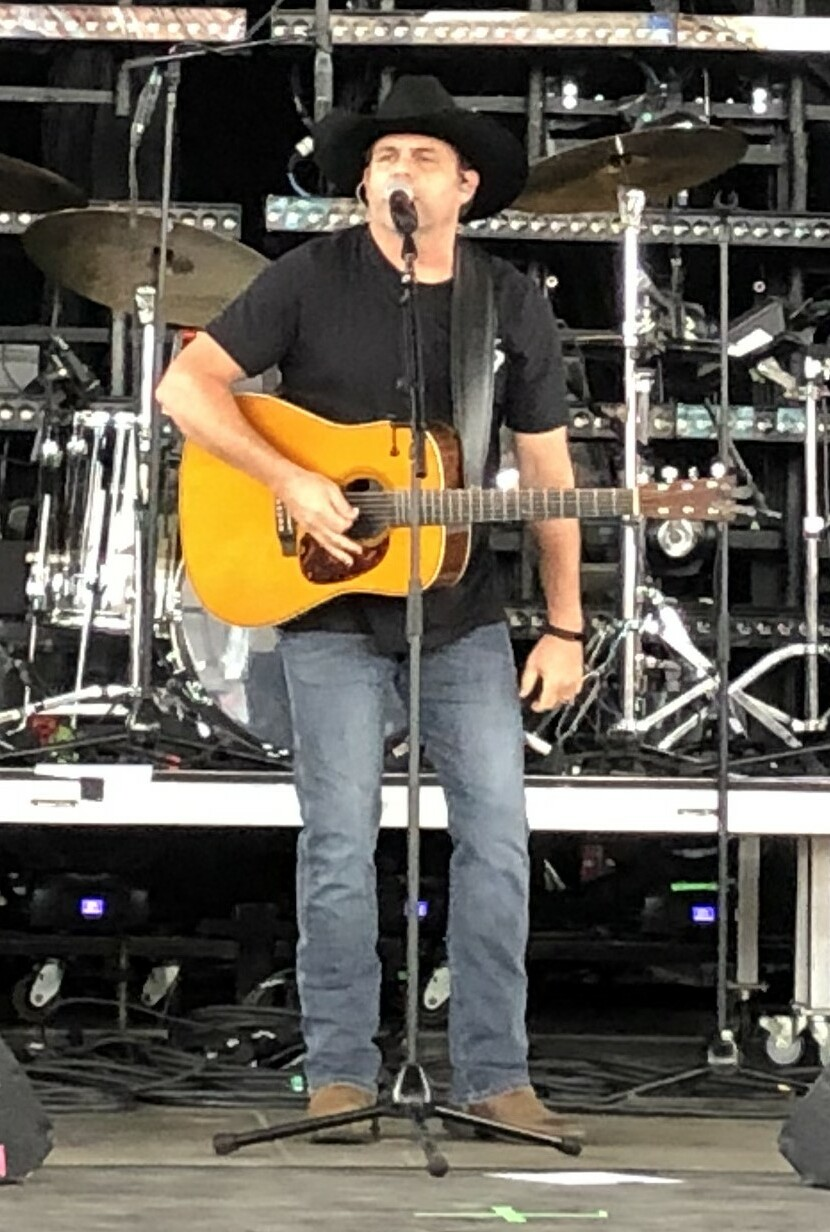
Rhett is the son of country singer-songwriter Rhett Akins, pictured in 2019.

Thomas Rhett Akins Jr. was born in Valdosta, Georgia, to mother Paige (née Braswell) and father Rhett Akins. Rhett Akins had hit singles in the 1990s with "That Ain't My Truck" and "Don't Get Me Started" before becoming a songwriter at the beginning of the 21st century.

He was raised in Hendersonville, Tennessee. He grew up knowing other singers including Tim McGraw and Brooks & Dunn. He has one younger sister, and two younger half-brothers; one on his mother's side, and one his father's side.

After learning to play drums while attending junior high school, Rhett later would go onstage with his father and play. In high school, he was part of a band named The High Heeled Flip Flops. Rhett went to Lipscomb University in Nashville, Tennessee, to study communications. He dropped out of college when he was 20 to pursue a career in music. He subsequently accepted a publishing deal by Big Machine Label Group to write songs.

== Career ==
=== Songwriting ===
Rhett co-wrote the song "I Ain't Ready to Quit" on Jason Aldean's 2010 album My Kinda Party and signed a recording contract with Big Machine Records' Valory Music Group division in 2011. The album's first 21 weeks were spent in the top 40 of the Billboard 200; it also has sold 1.7 million in its first years of release. Rhett also co-wrote the 2013 singles "1994" by Jason Aldean, "Parking Lot Party" by Lee Brice, and "Round Here" by Florida Georgia Line. During the chart week of September 21, 2013, the Country Airplay chart included five songs within the top 10 that Rhett or his father had co-written, including "It Goes Like This".

=== 2012–2015: It Goes Like This ===
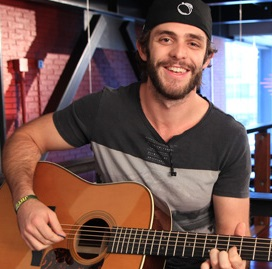
Rhett in 2013

In early 2012, he released his debut single, "Something to Do with My Hands", followed later that year by "Beer with Jesus". Both of these made top 30 on the Hot Country Songs charts. His third single, "It Goes Like This", topped the Country Airplay chart and also peaked at number 2 on the Hot Country Songs.

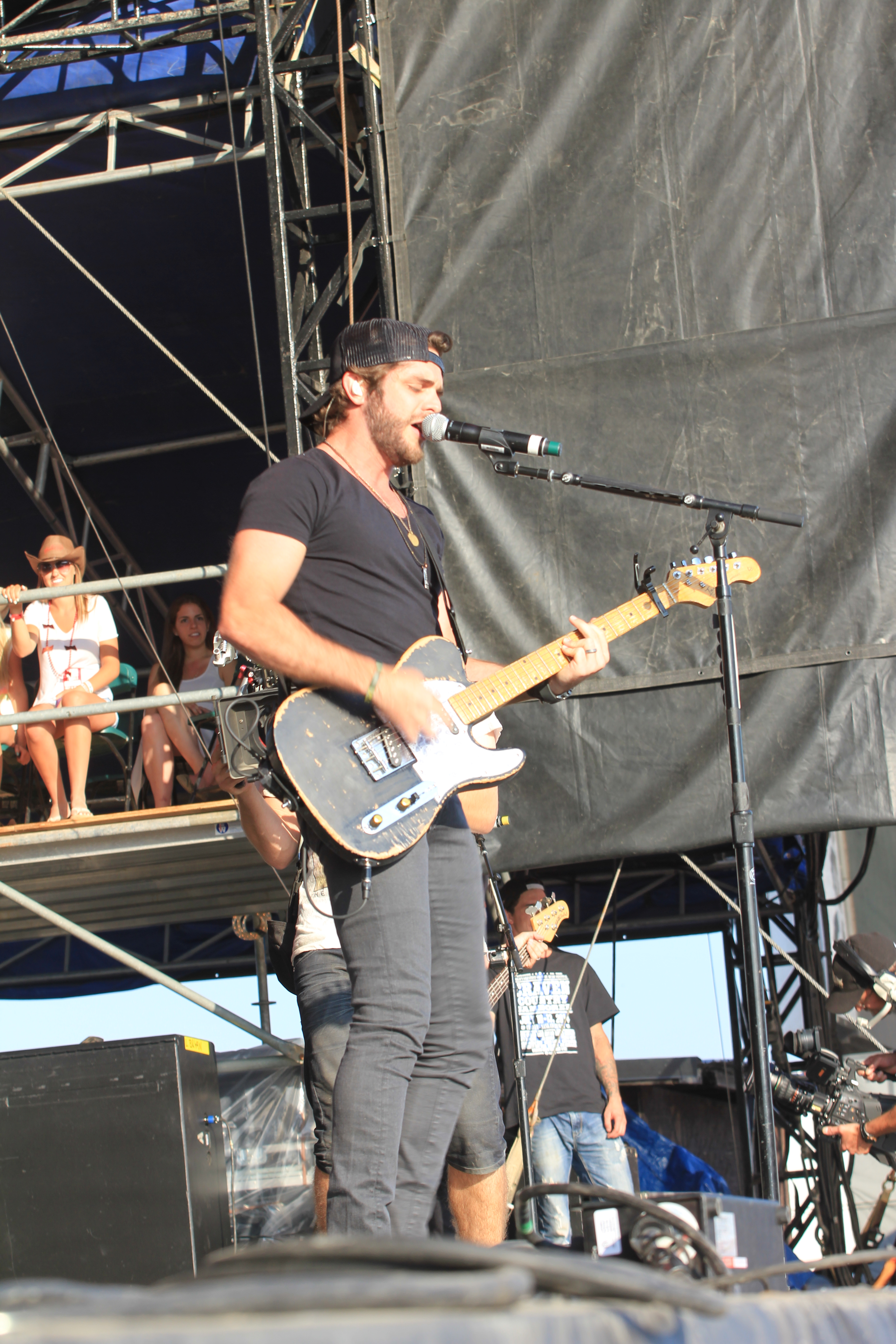
Thomas Rhett at the 2014 Craven Country Jamboree

His debut album, also titled It Goes Like This, was released on October 29, 2013. The album's fourth single, "Get Me Some of That", became Rhett's second number 1 single in early 2014. The album's fifth single, "Make Me Wanna", was released to country radio on August 4, 2014. It reached number one on the Country Airplay chart on March 7, 2015. In between the two singles, Rhett sang guest vocals along with Justin Moore on Brantley Gilbert's "Small Town Throwdown".

=== 2015–2017: Tangled Up ===
On April 7, 2015, Rhett released a new single titled "Crash and Burn" which served as the lead single to his second studio album. The album, Tangled Up, was released on September 25. It reached at number one on the Country Airplay chart in September 2015. The album's second single, "Die a Happy Man" released to country radio on September 28, 2015. It reached at number one on the Country Airplay, Hot Country Songs, and Canada Country chart in December 2015. and January 2016. It stayed at number one on the Country Airplay chart for 8 weeks, becoming the second song in the chart's history to do so. The album's third single, "T-Shirt" released to country radio on February 16, 2016. It reached at number one on the Country Airplay in June 2016, but received poor critical reviews criticizing its lyrical content. The album's fourth single, "Vacation" released to country radio on June 13, 2016. The album's fifth single, "Star of the Show", released to country radio on October 3, 2016.

=== 2017–2020: Life Changes and Center Point Road ===
On September 8, Rhett released his third studio album Life Changes. It includes the chart-topping singles "Craving You" featuring Maren Morris, "Unforgettable", and "Marry Me". The title track was released as the album's fourth single on April 16, 2018. The album's fifth single was "Sixteen".

On March 1, 2019, Rhett released "Look What God Gave Her" as the lead-off single to his fourth studio album, Center Point Road. The following night, on Saturday Night Live, Rhett performed another new song from the album, called "Don't Threaten Me With a Good Time." The album was released on May 31. "Remember You Young" was the album's second single, while "Beer Can't Fix" featuring Jon Pardi was the third single.

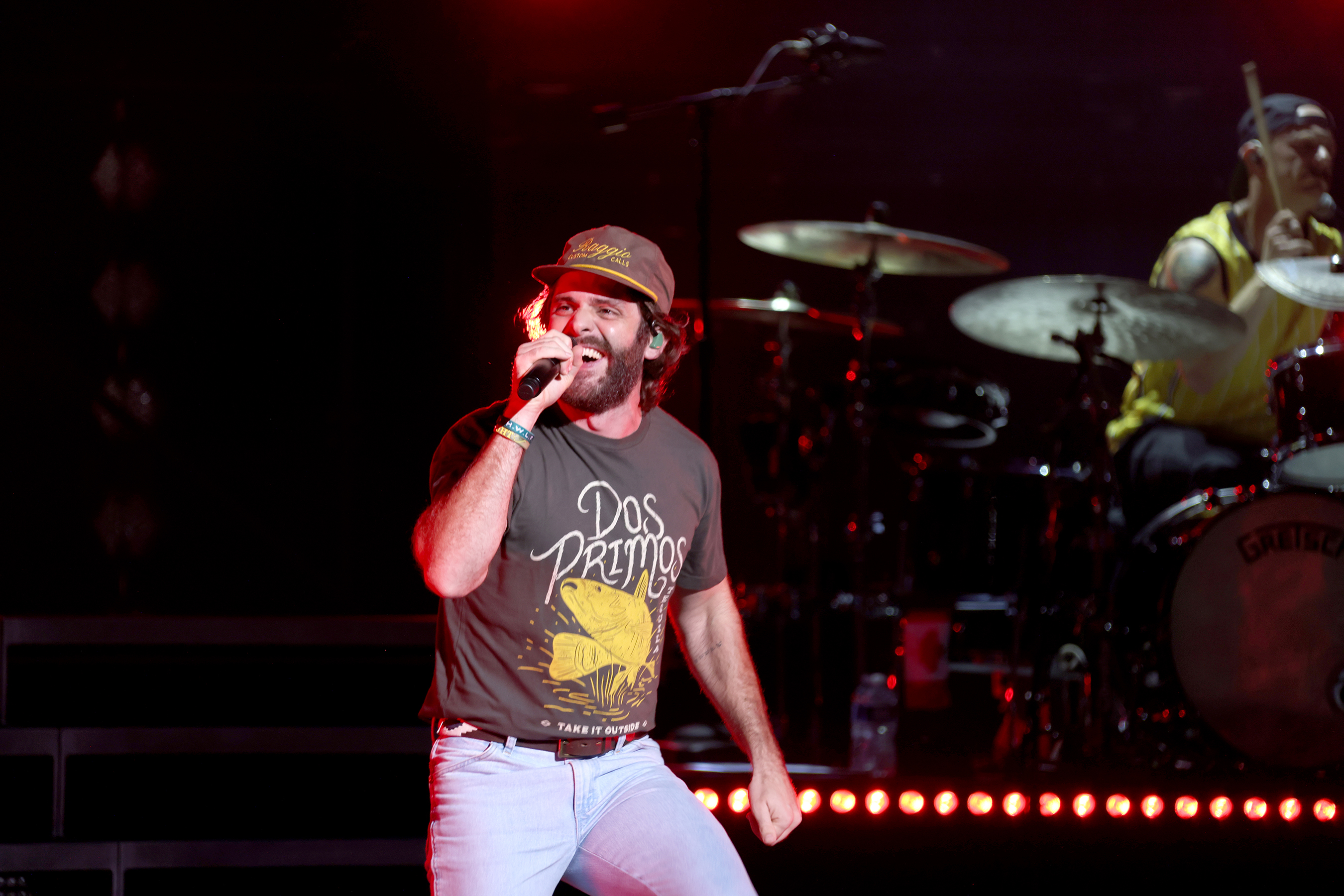
Rhett in 2021

In 2020, Rhett released the standalone single "Be a Light", a star-studded collaboration featuring Reba McEntire, Hillary Scott, Chris Tomlin and Keith Urban. All proceeds earned from the song are donated to the MusiCares COVID-19 Relief Fund. Rhett won Entertainer of the Year at the 2020 Academy of Country Music Awards.

=== 2021–2023: Country Again and Where We Started ===
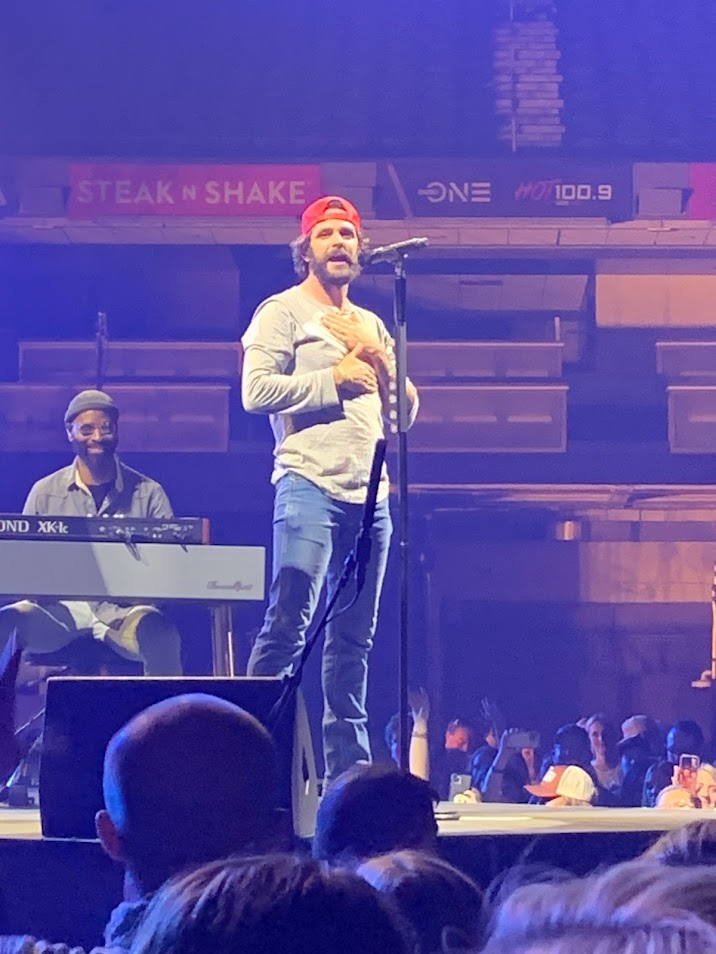
Rhett in 2023

In March 2021, Rhett announced a double album release, with the first part, Country Again: Side A, released on April 30, 2021. It includes the singles "What's Your Country Song" and "Country Again". The album sees Rhett return to his country roots, with stripped down songs that often include country elements, such as the fiddle. Six songs were co-written by his father, country singer Rhett Akins. Rhett released previews of some of the album's songs on Instagram during the COVID-19 pandemic. The second part of the album, Country Again: Side B, has yet to release. In March 2023, Rhett stated that the album had not come together because of his focus on releasing more high-energy music to play at live shows, but he still hoped to eventually release Side B.

In November 2021, he released "Slow Down Summer", which was the lead single from his sixth studio album Where We Started, released on April 1, 2022. The album's second single, "Half of Me," was released on June 6, 2022, as a collaboration with Riley Green. Rhett released the album's third single, "Angels (Don't Always Have Wings)" on January 23, 2023. The album's latter two singles reached number one on the Country Airplay chart. The album also features collaborations with Katy Perry, Tyler Hubbard, and Russell Dickerson.

On October 21, 2022, Rhett released his EP Merry Christmas, Y'all, featuring his take on four Christmas classics.

On September 29, 2023, Rhett released "20 Number Ones," a greatest hits album, in honor of "Half of Me" becoming his 20th number one single on the Country Aircheck/MediaBase chart. The album includes the bonus track "Mamaw's House," which was released as a single and features Morgan Wallen.

=== 2024–present: About a Woman ===
On May 10, 2024, Rhett released the song "Beautiful as You". On June 5, 2024, Rhett announced that his seventh album About a Woman would be released on August 23, 2024. In September 2024, Rhett co-hosted the 2024 Canadian Country Music Awards alongside MacKenzie Porter.

In 2026, Rhett joined Morgan Wallen as a direct support act on select dates of the Still the Problem Tour, performing in stadiums including Minneapolis, Las Vegas, Gainesville, and Ann Arbor.

== Personal life ==
Rhett married Lauren Akins (née Gregory), on October 12, 2012. In May 2017, they announced via Instagram that they were expecting and also in the process of adopting a child from Africa. Shortly after, they brought home their first daughter from Uganda, who was born on November 1, 2015. They then welcomed their second daughter in August 2017. Their third daughter was born on February 10, 2020, and their fourth daughter was born on November 15, 2021. On August 26, 2025, the couple announced that they were expecting their fifth child. On February 27, 2026, the couple announced the birth of their fifth child, a son.

Rhett is a Christian. He has incorporated his faith into his music through singles like "Beer With Jesus" and collaborations with worship singers such as Chris Tomlin.

== Discography ==
- It Goes Like This (2013)
- Tangled Up (2015)
- Life Changes (2017)
- Center Point Road (2019)
- Country Again: Side A (2021)
- Where We Started (2022)
- About a Woman (2024)

== Tours ==
Headlining

- Home Team Tour (2017)
- Life Changes Tour (2018)
- Very Hot Summer Tour (2019)
- Center Point Road Tour (2020–2021)
- Home Team Tour (2023)

Co-headlining

- Suits & Boots Tour with Brett Eldredge (2015)

Supporting

- Own the Night Tour with Lady Antebellum (2012)
- Night Train Tour with Jason Aldean (2013)
- Anything Goes Tour with Florida Georgia Line (2015)
- We Were Here Tour with Jason Aldean (2016)
- Six String Circus Tour with Jason Aldean (2016)
- My Kinda Saturday Night Tour with Luke Combs (2026)
- Still The Problem Tour with Morgan Wallen (2026)

== Awards and nominations ==
Year	Ceremony	Category	Recipient/Work	Result	Ref
2013	American Country Awards	New Artist of the Year	Thomas Rhett	Nominated	
2014	iHeartRadio Music Awards	Country Song of the Year	"It Goes Like This"	Nominated	
2014	CMT Music Awards	Video of the Year	"It Goes Like This"	Nominated	
2014	CMT Music Awards	Breakthrough Video of the Year	"It Goes Like This"	Nominated	
2014	Country Music Association Awards	New Artist of the Year	Thomas Rhett	Nominated	
2014	American Country Countdown Awards	Breakthrough Artist of the Year	Thomas Rhett	Nominated	
2015	Academy of Country Music Awards	New Artist of the Year	Thomas Rhett	Nominated	
2015	CMT Music Awards	Collaborative Video of the Year	"Small Town Throwdown" (shared with Brantley Gilbert & Justin Moore)	Nominated	
2015	BMI Country Awards	Top 50 Songs	"Make Me Wanna"	Won	
2015	Country Music Association Awards	New Artist of the Year	Thomas Rhett	Nominated	
2016	iHeartRadio Music Awards	Country Artist of the Year	Thomas Rhett	Nominated	
2016	iHeartRadio Music Awards	Best Lyrics	"Die a Happy Man"	Nominated	
2016	American Music Awards	Favorite Song	"Die a Happy Man"	Nominated	
2016	American Music Awards	Favorite Country Male Artist - Country	Thomas Rhett	Nominated	
2016	Academy of Country Music Awards	New Male Vocalist of the Year	Thomas Rhett	Nominated	
2016	Academy of Country Music Awards	Album of the Year	Tangled Up	Nominated	
2016	Academy of Country Music Awards	Single Record of the Year	"Die a Happy Man"	Won	
2016	Country Music Association Awards	Single of the Year	"Die a Happy Man"	Nominated	
2016	Country Music Association Awards	Song of the Year	"Die a Happy Man"	Won	
2016	Billboard Music Awards	Top Country Song	"Die a Happy Man"	Won	
2017	Grammy Awards	Best Country Song	"Die a Happy Man"	Nominated	
2017	iHeartRadio Music Awards	Country Artist of the Year	Thomas Rhett	Won	
2017	iHeartRadio Music Awards	Country Song of the Year	"T-Shirt"	Nominated	
2017	Academy of Country Music Awards	Male Vocalist of the Year	Thomas Rhett	Won	
2017	Academy of Country Music Awards	Song of the Year	"Die a Happy Man"	Won	
2017	CMT Music Awards	Video of the Year	"Star of the Show"	Nominated	
2017	CMT Music Awards	Male Video of the Year	"Star of the Show"	Nominated	
2017	CMT Music Awards	CMT Performance of the Year	"Close" (with Nick Jonas)	Nominated	
2017	Teen Choice Awards	Choice Country Song	"Craving You" (feat. Maren Morris)	Nominated	
2017	Country Music Association Awards	Musical Event of the Year	"Craving You" (feat. Maren Morris)	Nominated	
2017	Country Music Association Awards	Music Video of the Year	"Craving You" (feat. Maren Morris)	Nominated	
2017	Country Music Association Awards	Male Vocalist of the Year	Thomas Rhett	Nominated	
2017	American Music Awards	Favorite Male Artist - Country	Thomas Rhett	Nominated	
2018	Grammy Awards	Best Country Album	Life Changes	Nominated	
2018	iHeartRadio Music Awards	Country Artist of the Year	Thomas Rhett	Won	
2018	iHeartRadio Music Awards	Country Song of the Year	"Unforgettable"	Nominated	
2018	Academy of Country Music Awards	Male Vocalist of the Year	Thomas Rhett	Nominated	
2018	Academy of Country Music Awards	Album of the Year	Life Changes	Nominated	
2018	Academy of Country Music Awards	Video of the Year	"Marry Me"	Nominated	
2018	Academy of Country Music Awards	Vocal Event of the Year	"Craving You" (feat. Maren Morris)	Nominated	
2018	Billboard Music Awards	Top Country Artist	Thomas Rhett	Nominated	
2018	Billboard Music Awards	Top Country Male Artist	Thomas Rhett	Nominated	
2018	Billboard Music Awards	Top Country Album	Life Changes	Nominated	
2018	CMT Music Awards	Video of the Year	"Marry Me"	Nominated	
2018	CMT Music Awards	Collaborative Video of the Year	"Craving You" (feat. Maren Morris)	Nominated	
2018	CMT Music Awards	Male Video of the Year	"Marry Me"	Nominated	
2018	Country Music Association Awards	Male Vocalist of the Year	Thomas Rhett	Nominated	
2018	Country Music Association Awards	Album of the Year	Life Changes	Nominated	
2018	Country Music Association Awards	Music Video of the Year	"Marry Me"	Won	
2018	American Music Awards	Favorite Male Artist - Country	Thomas Rhett	Nominated	
2018	American Music Awards	Favorite Album - Country	Life Changes	Nominated	
2019	iHeartRadio Music Awards	Country Artist of the Year	Thomas Rhett	Nominated	
2019	Academy of Country Music Awards	Male Artist of the Year	Thomas Rhett	Won	
2019	CMT Music Awards	Male Video of the Year	"Life Changes"	Nominated	
2019	Teen Choice Awards	Choice Country Artist	Thomas Rhett	Nominated	
2019	Teen Choice Awards	Choice Country Song	"Look What God Gave Her"	Nominated	
2019	Country Music Association Awards	Male Vocalist of the Year	Thomas Rhett	Nominated	
2019	Country Music Association Awards	Album of the Year	Center Point Road	Nominated	
2019	American Music Awards	Favorite Male Artist - Country	Thomas Rhett	Nominated	
2020	Grammy Awards	Best Country Album	Center Point Road	Nominated	
2020	iHeartRadio Music Awards	Country Artist of the Year	Thomas Rhett	Nominated	
2020	Academy of Country Music Awards	Entertainer of the Year	Thomas Rhett	Won	
2020	Academy of Country Music Awards	Album of the Year	Center Point Road	Nominated	
2020	Academy of Country Music Awards	Male Artist of the Year	Thomas Rhett	Nominated	
2020	Academy of Country Music Awards	Video of the Year	"Remember You Young"	Won	
2020	CMT Music Awards	Video of the Year	"Remember You Young"	Nominated	
2020	CMT Music Awards	Male Video of the Year	"Remember You Young"	Nominated	
2020	CMT Music Awards	Collaborative Video of the Year	"Beer Can't Fix" (with Jon Pardi)	Nominated	
2020	Country Music Association Awards	Male Vocalist of the Year	Thomas Rhett	Nominated	
2020	Country Music Association Awards	Musical Event of the Year	"Be a Light" (feat. Reba McEntire, Hillary Scott, Chris Tomlin, and Keith Urban)	Nominated	
2021	Grammy Awards	Best Country Song	"Some People Do"	Nominated	
2021	Academy of Country Music Awards	Entertainer of the Year	Thomas Rhett	Nominated	
2021	Academy of Country Music Awards	Male Artist of the Year	Thomas Rhett	Won	
2021	Academy of Country Music Awards	Song of the Year	"Some People Do"	Nominated	
2021	Academy of Country Music Awards	Musical Event of the Year	"Be a Light"	Nominated	
2021	iHeartRadio Music Awards	Country Artist of the Year	Thomas Rhett	Nominated	
2021	CMT Music Awards	Male Video of the Year	"What's Your Country Song"	Nominated	
2021	Country Music Association Awards	Male Vocalist of the Year	Thomas Rhett	Nominated	
2022	Grammy Awards	Best Country Song	"Country Again"	Nominated	

== Television appearances ==
Year	Title	Role	Notes
2016	CMT Crossroads	Himself	Alongside Nick Jonas
2016–present	CMA Music Festival: Country's Night To Rock	Himself/co-host	Alongside Brett Eldredge and Kelsea Ballerini
2017	The Ranch	Himself	
2018	The Voice	Himself/Advisor	Season 15: Team Kelly
2019	Saturday Night Live	Himself/Musical guest	Season 44: "John Mulaney/Thomas Rhett"
2019	Kennedy Center Honors	Himself	

He also sang a duet with Elmo and the gang on Sesame Street.
