= Center Point Road =

Studio album by Thomas Rhett
- Released: May 31, 2019
- Genres: Country; pop
- Length: 52:45
- Label: Valory
- Producers: Thomas Rhett; Dann Huff; Jesse Frasure; Julian Bunetta; The Stereotypes; Cleve Wilson

Thomas Rhett chronology
Life Changes (2017)	Center Point Road (2019)	Country Again: Side A (2021)

Singles from Center Point Road
- 1. "Look What God Gave Her" Released: March 1, 2019; 2. "Remember You Young" Released: July 15, 2019; 3. "Beer Can't Fix" Released: January 6, 2020

Center Point Road is the fourth studio album by American country music singer Thomas Rhett, released on May 31, 2019, through Big Machine Label Group imprint Valory Music Co. It was supported by the lead single "Look What God Gave Her". Rhett co-wrote and co-produced all 16 tracks on the album, sharing production duties with Dann Huff, Jesse Frasure, Julian Bunetta, The Stereotypes, and Cleve Wilson. The album also features collaborations with Little Big Town, Jon Pardi, and Kelsea Ballerini. The album received a nomination for Best Country Album at the 62nd Annual Grammy Awards in 2020.

== Background ==
Rhett named the album after a road from his hometown of Hendersonville, Tennessee that he said symbolized his childhood.

== Promotion ==
"Look What God Gave Her" was released as the lead single from the album on March 1, 2019. On March 3, 2019, "Don't Threaten Me with a Good Time" was released, alongside a performance of it on Saturday Night Live. Rhett later revealed the cover art and track listing on March 29, and also shared the track "That Old Truck". On April 19, 2019, Rhett released "Remember You Young" as another promotional single.

== Commercial performance ==
Center Point Road debuted at No. 1 on the US Billboard 200 with 76,000 album-equivalent units, of which 45,000 were pure album sales. It is Rhett's second No. 1 album. In its first week it registered 33.59 million US streams, making it the largest streaming week for a country album at the time. The album has sold more than 101,600 copies in pure albums in the US and 362,000 in units consumed.

== Critical reception ==
Rhett was hailed for his versatility on Center Point Road by Rolling Stone, while Newsday suggested the album fell short of crossing over to pop music.

== Track listing ==
Center Point Road track listing
No.	Title	Writer(s)	Producer(s)	Length
1.	"Up"	Thomas Rhett; Ashley Gorley; Jesse Frasure; Shane McAnally	Thomas Rhett; Dann Huff; Jesse Frasure	3:27
2.	"Don't Threaten Me with a Good Time" (featuring Little Big Town)	Rhett; Karen Fairchild; Jonathan Yip; Ray Romulus; Jeremy Reeves; Ray Charles McCullough II; Gorley; Frasure	Rhett; Huff; Frasure; The Stereotypes	3:35
3.	"Blessed"	Rhett; Joe Spargur; Sean Douglas	Rhett; Huff; Frasure; Julian Bunetta	3:34
4.	"Look What God Gave Her"	Rhett; Rhett Akins; Julian Bunetta; John Ryan; Jacob Kasher; Ammar Malik	Rhett; Huff; Bunetta	2:48
5.	"Center Point Road" (featuring Kelsea Ballerini)	Rhett; Amy Wadge; Cleve Wilson; Frasure	Rhett; Huff; Frasure; Cleve Wilson	3:36
6.	"That Old Truck"	Rhett; Bunetta; Kamron Kimbro; Ryan Tedder	Rhett; Huff; Bunetta	3:32
7.	"VHS"	Rhett; Wadge; Gorley; Frasure	Rhett; Huff; Frasure	3:16
8.	"Notice"	Rhett; Gorley; Frasure; Douglas	Rhett; Huff; Frasure	3:42
9.	"Sand"	Rhett; Frasure; Hardy	Rhett; Huff; Frasure	2:42
10.	"Beer Can't Fix" (featuring Jon Pardi)	Rhett; Bunetta; Tedder; Zach Skelton	Rhett; Huff; Bunetta	3:29
11.	"Things You Do for Love"	Rhett; Gorley; Frasure; Josh Osborne; Luke Laird	Rhett; Huff; Frasure	3:26
12.	"Remember You Young"	Rhett; Gorley; Frasure	Rhett; Huff; Frasure	3:00
13.	"Don't Stop Drivin'"	Rhett; Gorley; Josh Miller; Zach Crowell	Rhett; Huff; Frasure	3:03
14.	"Barefoot"	Rhett; Miller; Matt Dragstrem; Akins	Rhett; Huff; Frasure	3:00
15.	"Dream You Never Had"	Rhett; Gorley; Frasure; Akins	Rhett; Huff; Frasure	3:22
16.	"Almost"	Rhett; Wadge; Gorley; Frasure	Rhett; Huff; Frasure	3:13
Total length:				52:45

== Personnel ==
- Thomas Rhett – lead vocals, backing vocals
- Dave Cohen – keyboards
- Charlie Judge – keyboards, cello
- Julian Bunetta – keyboards, programming, electric guitar, drums, backing vocals
- Matt Dragstrem – programming, backing vocals
- Jesse Frasure – programming, backing vocals
- David Huff – programming
- Zach Skelton – programming
- The Stereotypes – programming
- Cleve Wilson – programming
- Tyler Chiarelli – electric guitar
- Brandon Day – electric guitar
- Dann Huff – electric guitar
- John Ryan – electric guitar, backing vocals
- Derek Wells – electric guitar
- Ilya Toshinsky – acoustic guitars
- Jimmie Lee Sloas – bass
- Chris Kimmerer – drums
- Randy Leago – baritone saxophone
- Jim Hoke – tenor saxophone, horn arrangements
- Barry Green – trombone
- Mike Haynes – trumpet
- Kasey Akins – backing vocals
- Lauren Akins – backing vocals
- Bob Bailey – backing vocals
- Jamar Carter – backing vocals
- Everett Drake – backing vocals
- Kim Fleming – backing vocals
- Vicki Hampton – backing vocals
- Michael Hardy – backing vocals
- Ashley Gorley – backing vocals
- Kyla Jade – backing vocals
- Macy Page – backing vocals
- Josh Reedy – backing vocals
- Jason Kyle Saetveit – backing vocals
- Ryan Tedder – backing vocals
- Russell Terrell – backing vocals
- Amy Wadge – backing vocals
- Kelsea Ballerini – duet vocals on "Center Point Road"
- Little Big Town – backing vocals on "Don't Threaten Me with a Good Time"
- Jon Pardi – duet vocals on "Beer Can't Fix"

== Charts ==
=== Weekly charts ===
Weekly chart performance for Center Point Road
Chart (2019)	Peak position
Australian Albums (ARIA)	24
Canadian Albums (Billboard)	2
Scottish Albums (Official Charts)	53
UK Country Albums (Official Charts)	1
US Billboard 200	1
US Top Country Albums (Billboard)	1

=== Year-end charts ===
Year-end chart performance for Center Point Road
Chart (2019)	Position
US Billboard 200	153
US Top Country Albums (Billboard)	17
Chart (2020)	Position
US Billboard 200	164
US Top Country Albums (Billboard)	15

== Certifications ==
Certifications for Center Point Road
Region	Certification	Certified units/sales
Canada (Music Canada)	Platinum	80,000^{‡}
United States (RIAA)	Gold	500,000^{‡}
^{‡} Sales+streaming figures based on certification alone.
