= Jesse Frasure =

Record producer

Jesse Frasure (DJ Telemitry)
- Born: Jesse Vernon Frasure; September 18, 1981 (age 44); Dearborn, Michigan
- Genres: Pop; EDM; country; hip hop
- Occupations: Music publisher; songwriter; record producer; DJ
- Instruments: Guitar; piano; turntables
- Years active: 2001—present
- Website: www.instagram.com/telemitry

Jesse Vernon Frasure (born September 18, 1981), also known as DJ Telemitry, is an American music publisher, record producer, songwriter, and DJ. He has written 22 number one songs and has cuts with various artists including Chris Stapleton, Marshmello, Miranda Lambert, Kacey Musgraves, Thomas Rhett, Leon Bridges, Kane Brown, Jelly Roll, Blake Shelton, Cole Swindell, Meghan Trainor, Florida Georgia Line and more.

Frasure won BMI's Country Songwriter Of The Year Award in 2018 and 2021. He has been Grammy nominated twice and was nominated as ACM's Songwriter Of The Year in 2022. He has also received six consecutive CMA Triple Play Awards for having written three number one radio songs in a 12-month period.

== Biography ==
A Detroit native, Frasure (DJ Telemitry), now lives in Nashville, Tennessee with his wife Stevie Frasure. Frasure began his music career working at Major Bob Music in Nashville, eventually rising to VP of A&R and also signing a publishing and production deal with the company. In June 2016, Jay-Z's Roc Nation Nashville and Warner/Chappell Music launched Rhythm House, a venture led by Frasure. Rhythm House includes Frasure's own writing and production activities, as well as the signing and development of other composers and producers.

Growing up, he was surrounded by a family with a passion for music. His father often played in bands full of Motown and classic rock. As a college student at Michigan State University, Frasure first began programming his own music, heavily influenced by his love for electronic dance and the mix of his Motown roots. He then moved to Nashville, finishing his college career at Belmont University, It was there that a passion for even more styles of music grew.

Throughout his career, Frasure has merged his love for all genres of music to diversify his sound. He has written 22 number one songs and has cuts with various artists including Chris Stapleton, Marshmello, Miranda Lambert, Kacey Musgraves, Thomas Rhett, Leon Bridges, Kane Brown, Jelly Roll, Blake Shelton, Cole Swindell, Meghan Trainor, Florida Georgia Line and more. He's also seen multi-platinum success producing, co-writing, and remixing for artists including Luke Bryan, Rascal Flatts, Billy Currington, Lauren Alaina, Brett Kissel, Gary Allan, Hot Chelle Rae, Jordin Sparks. In 2015, he reached the No. 1 spot on the Billboard Country charts for the first time with his Florida Georgia Line co-write "Sun Daze".

As DJ Telemitry, Frasure has DJed parties for celebrity clients including Nicki Minaj, Lil Wayne, Drake, Florida Georgia Line, Thomas Rhett, Chris Lane & Lauren Bushnell, Todd English, and CeeLo Green. He has also DJed across the globe for party planners Colin Cowie Lifestyles and Angel City Designs, and hosts the radio shows, "Little Bit Country" and "YeeDM" on Apple Music Radio.

== Awards and nominations ==
Year	Award	Category	Work/Title
2023	ACM Awards Winner	Song Of The Year (Winner)	"She Had Me At Heads Carolina" - Cole Swindell (Writer)
2023	Grammy Award Nominee	Best Country Song	"If I Was A Cowboy" - Miranda Lambert
2022	ACM Awards Nominee	Songwriter of the Year	n/a
2022	ACM Awards Nominee (Producer)	Album Of The Year	Country Again: Side A - Thomas Rhett (Writer, Co-producer)
2022	CMA Triple Play Awards	Triple Play Winner	“Whiskey And Rain” – Michael Ray “One Mississippi” – Kane Brown “Slow Down Summer” - Thomas Rhett
2021	Grammy Award Nominee	Best Country Song	"Some People Do" - Old Dominion
2021	BMI Country Awards	Songwriter of the Year (Winner)	n/a
2021	CMA Triple Play Awards	Triple Play Winner	“One Big Country Song” – Locash “Hole In The Bottle – Kelsea Ballerini “What’s Your Country Song” - Thomas Rhett
2020	CMA Triple Play Awards	Triple Play Winner	“One That Got Away” – Michael Ray “One Thing Right” – Marshmello, Kane Brown “Remember You Young” - Thomas Rhett
2019	Grammy Award Nominee	Best Country Album	Golden Hour - Kacey Musgraves "Wonder Woman" (Writer)
2019	CMA Triple Play Awards	Triple Play Winner	Unforgettable” – Thomas Rhett “Marry Me” – Thomas Rhett “Life Changes”– Thomas Rhett
2018	Grammy Award Nominee	Best Country Album	Life Changes - Thomas Rhett (Writer, Co-producer)
2018	BMI Country Awards	Songwriter of the Year (Winner)	n/a
2018	CMA Triple Play Awards	Triple Play Winner	“Dirt On My Boots” – Jon Pardi “Road Less Traveled” – Lauren Alaina “No Such Thing As A Broken Heart” – Old Dominion
2017	CMA Triple Play Awards	Triple Play Winner	“Crash And Burn” – Thomas Rhett “I Like The Sound Of That” – Rascal Flatts “Fix” – Chris Lane
2017	CMA Awards Nominee	Song Of The Year	"Dirt On My Boots" - Jon Pardi (Writer)
2016	ACM Awards	Record of the Year (Winner)	"Die A Happy Man" - Thomas Rhett (Co-producer)
2016	CMA Awards	Single of the Year (Winner)	"Die A Happy Man" - Thomas Rhett (Co-producer)
2013	Dove Award Winner	Dove Award Winner	"Hold On" - Toby Mac

== Number One Radio Songs ==
1. Kane Brown & Marshmello - "One Thing Right"
2. Cole Swindell - "She Had Me at Heads Carolina" (5 weeks at #1)
3. Jon Pardi - "Dirt On My Boots" (3 weeks at #1)
4. Kelsea Ballerini - "Hole in the Bottle"
5. Kane Brown - "One Mississippi"
6. Thomas Rhett - "Marry Me"
7. Thomas Rhett - "Life Changes"
8. Thomas Rhett - "Crash and Burn"
9. Thomas Rhett - "Unforgettable"
10. Thomas Rhett - "Remember You Young"
11. Thomas Rhett - "What's Your Country Song"
12. Thomas Rhett - "Slow Down Summer"
13. Florida Georgia Line - "Sun Daze"
14. Rascal Flatts - "I Like the Sound of That"
15. Chris Lane - "Fix"
16. Lauren Alaina - "Road Less Traveled"
17. Old Dominion - "No Such Thing as a Broken Heart"
18. Michael Ray - "One That Got Away"
19. LoCash - "One Big Country Song"
20. Michael Ray - "Whiskey and Rain"
21. Toby Mac - "Hold On"
22. Toby Mac - "Christmas This Year"

== Select Discography ==
Year	Artist	Album	Song Title	Contribution
2024	Brett Kissel	Let Your Horses Run – The Album	"Let Your Horses Run	Writer, Producer
2023	Miranda Lambert/Leon Bridges	If You Were Mine	"If You Were Mine"	Writer
2023	Jelly Roll	Whitsitt Chapel	"Halfway to Hell"	Co-producer, writer
2023	Jelly Roll	Whitsitt Chapel	"The Lost"	Co-producer, writer
2023	Jelly Roll	Dragging These Roots - Single	"Dragging These Roots"	Co-producer, writer
2023	Gabby Barrett	Cowboy Back - Single	"Cowboy Back"	Writer
2023	Chris Young	Young Love & Saturday Nights - Single	"Young Love & Saturday Nights"	Writer
2023	Brothers Osborne	Brothers Osborne	"We Ain't Good at Breaking Up"	Writer
2023	Brothers Osborne	Brothers Osborne	"Love You Too"	Writer
2023	Old Dominion	Memory Lane	"Both Sides of the Bed"	Writer
2023	Nate Smith	Nate Smith (Deluxe)	"Love is Blind"	Writer
2023	Larry Fleet	Earned It	"Muddy Water"	Writer
2023	Michael Ray	Dive Bars and Broken Hearts	"Workin' On It"	Writer
2023	Michael Ray	Dive Bars and Broken Hearts	"Dive Bars and Broken Hearts"	Writer
2022	Cole Swindell	Stereotype	"She Had Me At Heads Carolina"	Writer
2022	Kelsea Ballerini	Subject To Change	"Love Is a Cowboy"	Writer
2022	Kane Brown	Different Man	"Devil Don't Even Bother"	Writer
2022	Kane Brown	One Mississippi	"One Mississippi"	Writer
2022	Steve Aoki/Kane Brown	Move On	"Move On"	Writer
2022	Elle King	Come Get Your Wife	"Crawlin' Mood"	Writer
2022	Mitchell Tenpenny	This is the Heavy	"Miss You Cause I'm Drinking"	Writer
2022	Little Big Town	Mr. Sun	"Heaven Had a Dance Floor"	Writer
2022	Ingrid Andress	Good Person	"Seeing Someone Else"	Writer
2022	Tyler Hubbard	Tyler Hubbard	"Baby Gets Her Lovin' "	Writer
2022	Jackson Dean	Greenbroke	"Trailer Park"	Writer
2022	Chris Lane/Lauren Alaina	Dancin' in the Moonlight	"Dancin' in the Moonlight"	Writer
2022	Ben Burgess	Tears the Size of Texas	"Jackson"	Writer
2021	Miranda Lambert	Palomino	"If I Was a Cowboy"	Writer
2021	Miranda Lambert	Tequila Does (Telemitry Remix)	"Tequila Does (Telemitry Remix)"	Producer
2021	Lady A	What A Song Can Do (Chapter One)	"Things He Handed Down"	Writer
2021	Thomas Rhett	Country Again (Side A)	"What's Your Country Song"	Co-producer, writer
2021	Thomas Rhett	Slow Down Summer	"Slow Down Summer"	Co-producer, writer
2021	Blake Shelton	Body Language	Minimum Wage	Writer
2021	Kidd G	Down Home Boy	"Paper Hearts"	Co-producer, writer
2021	Brett Kissel	What Is Life?	"Die to Go Home"	Co-producer, writer
2021	Brett Kissel	What Is Life?	"Without"	Co-producer, writer
2020	Kelsea Ballerini	Kelsea	"Hole in the Bottle"	Writer
2020	Michael Ray	Higher Education	"Whiskey and Rain"	Co-producer, writer
2019	Florida Georgia Line	Can't Say I Ain't Country	"Y'all Boys"	Writer
2019	Florida Georgia Line	Can't Say I Ain't Country	"Blessings"	Writer
2019	Kane Brown/Marshmello	One Thing Right	"One Thing Right"	Writer
2019	Little Big Town	Nightfall	"Over Drinking"	Writer
2019	Thomas Rhett feat. Little Big Town	Center Point Road Christmas in Diverse City	"Don't Threaten Me With A Good Time"	Co-producer, writer
2019	Thomas Rhett	Center Point Road Christmas in Diverse City	"Center Point Road Album"	Co-producer, writer
2019	Thomas Rhett	Center Point Road Christmas in Diverse City	"Remember You Young"	Co-producer, writer
2019	LoCash	Brothers	"One Big Country Song"	Writer
2018	Kylie Minogue	Golden	"Sincerely Yours"	Writer, producer
2018	Fil Eisle	N/A	"Oblivion"	Writer
2018	Kacey Musgraves	Golden Hour	"Wonder Woman"	Writer
2018	Dan + Shay	Dan + Shay	"Alone Together"	Writer
2018	Little Big Town	Summer Fever	"Summer Fever"	Producer, writer
2018	Michael Ray	Amos	"One That Got Away"	Writer
2018	Cole Swindell	All of It	"The Ones Who Got Me Here"	Writer
2018	Hunter Brothers	State of Mind	"Lost"	Writer
2017	Thomas Rhett	Life Changes	"Unforgettable"	Composer
2017	Thomas Rhett	Life Changes	"Marry Me"	Writer
2017	Thomas Rhett	Life Changes	"Drink a Little Beer"	Writer, producer, programming
2017	Thomas Rhett	Life Changes	"Smooth Like the Summer"	Writer, producer, programming
2017	Thomas Rhett	Life Changes	"Life Changes"	Writer
2017	Lady Antebellum	The Shack Soundtrack	"Lay Our Flowers Down"	Writer, keyboards, programming
2017	Lady Antebellum	Heart Break	"Heart Break"	Writer, programming
2017	Aliya Moulden	The Complete Season 12 Collection (The Voice)	"Never Be Lonely"	Writer
2017	Faith Hill/Tim McGraw	The Rest of Our Life	"Devil Callin' Me Back"	Writer
2017	Tyminski	Southern Gothic	"Southern Gothic"	Producer, engineer, programming, writer
2017	Tyminski	Southern Gothic	"Temporary Love"	Producer, engineer, programming, writer
2017	Tyminski	Southern Gothic	"Perfect Poison"	Producer, engineer, programming, writer
2017	Tyminski	Southern Gothic	"Hollow Hallelujah"	Producer, engineer, programming, writer
2017	Tyminski	Southern Gothic	"Good for Your Soul"	Producer, engineer, programming, writer
2017	Tyminski	Southern Gothic	"Haunted Heart"	Producer, engineer, programming, writer
2017	Tyminski	Southern Gothic	"Bloodline"	Producer, engineer, programming, writer
2017	Colt Ford	Love Hope Faith	"Dirt Road Disco"	Writer
2017	TobyMac	Christmas in Diverse City	"Christmas This Year"	Writer
2017	Rascal Flatts	Back to Us	"Hopin' You Were Lookin'"	Writer
2017	Easton Corbin	A Girl Like You	"A Girl Like You"	Writer
2016	Brooke Eden	Welcome to the Weekend	"Act Like You Don't"	Writer
2016	LoCash	The Fighters	"Ring On Every Finger"	Writer
2016	Charles Kelley	The Driver	"Lonely Girl"	Writer
2016	Dan + Shay	Obsessed	"Round the Clock"	Writer, bass, drums, engineer, keyboards, producer, programming
2016	Old Dominion	Happy Endings	"No Such Thing as a Broken Heart"	Writer
2016	Jo Smith	Introducing Jo Smith	"Queen of Fools"	Writer, producer
2016	Jo Smith	Introducing Jo Smith	"Dance Dirty"	Writer, producer
2016	Jo Smith	Introducing Jo Smith	"Poster Child"	Writer, producer
2016	David Nail	Fighter	"Ease Your Pain"	Writer
2016	Florida Georgia Line	Dig Your Roots	"Summerland"	Writer
2016	Kenny Chesney	Cosmic Hallelujah	"Rich and Miserable"	Writer
2016	The Cadillac Three	Bury Me In My Boots	"Drunk Like You"	Writer
2015	Meghan Trainor	Title	"Mr. Almost"	Writer
2015	Who Is Fancy	Goodbye	"Goodbye"	Writer, producer
2015	Gary Allan	Hangover Tonight	"Hangover Tonight"	Writer
2015	Gary Allan	N/A	"Getting Played Again"	Writer
2015	Billy Currington	Summer Forever	"Summer Forever"	Writer
2015	Chris Lane	Girl Problems	"Fix"	Writer
2015	Lauren Alaina	Road Less Traveled	"Road Less Traveled"	Writer
2015	Jon Pardi	California Sunrise	"Dirt On My Boots"	Writer
2015	Thomas Rhett	Tangled Up	"Crash and Burn"	Writer
2014	Florida Georgia Line	Anything Goes	"Sun Daze"	Writer
2014	Florida Georgia Line	Anything Goes	"Good Good"	Writer
2014	Chase Bryant	Chase Bryant	"Jet Black Pontiac"	Writer
2014	tobyMac	Eye'M All Mixed Up	"Mac Daddy (Tru's Reality) [Telemrity Remix]"	Writer
2014	Rascal Flatts	Rewind	"I Like the Sound of That"	Writer
2014	Rascal Flatts	Rewind	"DJ Tonight"	Writer
2014	Five Kings	N/A	"Oblivion"	Writer, Programmer
2014	Kelleigh Bannen	N/A	"Thousand Days of Summer"	Writer
2014	Natalie Stovall And the Drive	Mason Jar	"Mason Jar"	Writer
2014	David Archuleta	No Matter How Far	"Love Don't Hate"	Writer
2014	Dallas Smith	Lifted	"Cheap Seats"	Writer
2014	Leah Turner	Leah Turner (EP)	"Beat Up Bronco"	Writer, producer
2014	Leah Turner	Leah Turner (EP)	"Bless My Heart"	Writer, producer
2014	Leah Turner	Leah Turner (EP)	"Take The Keys"	Writer, producer
2014	Leah Turner	Leah Turner (EP)	"My Finger"	Writer, producer
2014	Jessie James Decker	Clint Eastwood	"Clint Eastwood"	Writer
2013	Capital Kings	Capital Kings	"You'll Never Be Alone"	Writer, Programmer
2013	Capital Kings	Capital Kings	"Ready For Home"	Writer, Programmer
2013	Royal Tailor	Royal Tailor	"Remain"	Writer
2012	Meghan Trainor	N/A	"Who I Wanna Be"	Writer
2012	tobyMac	Eye'M All Mixed Up	"Me Without You (Telemitry Remix)"	Remixer
2012	tobyMac	Eye On It	"Mac Daddy"	Writer, programming
2012	tobyMac	Eye On It	"LoudNClear (Telemitry Remix)"	Remixer
2012	tobyMac	Dubbed & Freq'd: A Remix Project	"Made To Love (Telemitry Remix)"	Remixer
2011	Luke Bryan	N/A	"Country Girl Shake It For Me (Telemitry Remix)"	Remixer
2010	tobyMac	Tonight	"Hold On"	Writer, programming
2010	tobyMac	Christmas in Diverse City	"Christmas This Year"	Writer, programming
2010	tobyMac	Dubbed & Freq'd: A Remix Project	"Hold On (Telemitry Remix)"	Writer, Remixer
2010	Hot Chelle Rae	Whatever	"The Only One"	Writer
