= Marry Me (Thomas Rhett song) =

Single by Thomas Rhett

from the album Life Changes
- Released: November 20, 2017
- Recorded: 2017
- Genre: Country
- Length: 3:26
- Label: Valory
- Songwriters: Thomas Rhett; Shane McAnally; Ashley Gorley; Jesse Frasure
- Producers: Dann Huff; Jesse Frasure; Thomas Rhett

Thomas Rhett singles chronology
"Unforgettable" (2017)	"Marry Me" (2017)	"Life Changes" (2018)

Music video
- "Marry Me" on YouTube

"Marry Me" is a song recorded by American country music singer Thomas Rhett. It was released to country radio on November 20, 2017, via Valory Music Group as the third single from his third studio album, Life Changes (2017). The song was written by Rhett, Jesse Frasure, Ashley Gorley and Shane McAnally.

== Background ==
"Marry Me" is a song where the narrator watches a desired woman marry someone else. It was quoted as "a clever ode to rejection" by StarTribune.com.

== Commercial performance ==
The song peaked at No. 2 on the Hot Country Songs chart on February 17, 2018 where it stayed for 6 weeks. It reached No. 1 on Country Airplay for charts dated March 10, 2018. It was certified Platinum by the RIAA on March 13, 2018, and has sold 451,000 copies in the United States as of June 2018. By August 2021 it was certified 4× Platinum, for sales of an equivalent of 4,000,000 units.

== Critical reception ==
American Songwriter and Taste of Country both ranked the song number three on their lists of the greatest Thomas Rhett songs.

== Music video ==
The official music video was directed by TK McKamy and released on December 17, 2017 on Thomas Rhett's Vevo channel.

In the video, a young girl named Ellie is seen playing dress up with her dolls and imagining her wedding day. Sam, the boy next door, peeks through the window and watches it all unfold before heading out to play football. As the song progresses, their friendship develops and Ellie becomes his biggest fan at a high school football game. Later, at a local diner, he almost kisses her, only for the moment to be interrupted by one of his teammates, whom Ellie merely shrugs off as just a friend. However, Ellie later ends up engaged to that same person, and the pain causes Sam to leave the wedding after dropping off the gift he got for her, wrapped in the same tie-dyed T-shirt with his name on the back that Ellie used to wear to his games. Sam is later seen eating alone at the same diner, the same table where he nearly kissed Ellie, as he pours whiskey from his flask into a coffee cup. The video ends on a cliffhanger as Sam hears a tap on the window, only to find Ellie, still in her wedding dress, with tears in her eyes and the same confused shrug as the other night at the diner. One possible explanation for this is that Ellie's fiance left her standing at the altar and it made her realize she was ready to reciprocate Sam's feelings.

Rhett completes the story of Sam and Ellie in his 2019 video Remember You Young.

== Charts ==
=== Weekly charts ===
Chart (2017–2018)	Peak position
Canada (Canadian Hot 100)	45
Canada Country (Billboard)	1
US Billboard Hot 100	30
US Country Airplay (Billboard)	1
US Hot Country Songs (Billboard)	2

=== Year-end charts ===
Chart (2018)	Position
Canada (Canadian Hot 100)	99
US Billboard Hot 100	76
US Country Airplay (Billboard)	24
US Hot Country Songs (Billboard)	5

== Certifications ==
Region	Certification	Certified units/sales
Australia (ARIA)	Platinum	70,000^{‡}
Canada (Music Canada)	Platinum	80,000^{‡}
United States (RIAA)	4× Platinum	451,000
^{‡} Sales+streaming figures based on certification alone.

== Awards and nominations ==
Year	Ceremony	Category	Recipient/Work	Result	Ref
2018	Country Music Association Awards	Music Video of the Year	Thomas Rhett - "Marry Me"	Won	
