= 2016 in country music =

This is a list of notable events in country music that took place in 2016.

== Events ==
- January 7 – Rachel Reinert announces that she is leaving the band Gloriana.
- January 26 – Thomas Rhett's "Die a Happy Man" spends a sixth week at No. 1 on Country Airplay, becoming the first artist to spend six or more weeks atop that chart since Taylor Swift did so with "Our Song" in late 2007.
- February 11 – Charles Kelley and wife Cassie McConnell welcome first child, son Ward Charles Kelley.
- March 1 – Don Williams announces his retirement after six decades in the music business. He died in September 2017 at age 78.
- March 4 – Loretta Lynn releases her album Full Circle. This album is the first album from Lynn in over a decade since 2004's Van Lear Rose.
- March 7 – Dolly Parton announces plans for her first major North American tour in 25 years.
- April 1 – Carrie Underwood quest Kellie Pickler, Kelleigh Bannen, Lauren Alaina and Jana Kramer at the 4th ACM Party for a Cause Festival in Las Vegas Festival Grounds.
- April 30 – Ray Pillow celebrates his 50th Grand Ole Opry anniversary
- May 12 – ABC cancels musical drama Nashville after four seasons. One month later, the series is picked up by CMT.
- June 1 – The Dixie Chicks begin their DCX MMXVI World Tour, the first time the band toured North America in ten years.
- June 8 – Kellie Pickler and Aaron Tippin at the CMT Music Awards.
- July 11 – The body of Craig Morgan's 19-year-old son, Jerry Greer, is recovered from Kentucky Lake.
- July 15 – Bill Anderson Celebrates his 55th Grand Ole Opry Anniversary
- September 16 – A total of 30 artists gather to record "Forever Country", a single released in honor of the 50th annual Country Music Association awards. The song immediately debuted on country radio and reached the Hot Country Airplay's top 40 in its first week on the chart; on the all-encompassing Hot Country Songs chart, the song debuted at No. 1 the week of October 8, the third song to do so since its inception in 2012.
- December 17 – Benny Birchfield, the widower of country music singer Jean Shepard, is injured following an attack at his home, where two others died. One of the victims was Icie Hawkins, granddaughter of Shepard and Hawkshaw Hawkins.

== Top hits of the year ==
The following songs placed within the Top 20 on the Hot Country Songs, Country Airplay or Canada Country charts in 2016:

=== Singles released by American artists ===
Songs	Airplay	Canada	Single	Artist	References
19	—	—	"Ain't No Stopping Us Now"	Kane Brown	
6	1	2	"American Country Love Song"	Jake Owen	
11	—	—	"At Last"	Sundance Head	
4	1	2	"Backroad Song"	Granger Smith	
5	1	2	"Beautiful Drug"	Zac Brown Band	
6	1	1	"Break on Me"	Keith Urban	
2	2	3	"Break Up in a Small Town"	Sam Hunt	
2	2	2	"Burning House"	Cam	
4	—	—	"Burning House"	Emily Ann Roberts	
2	1	1	"Came Here to Forget"	Blake Shelton	
17	14	6	"Castaway"	Zac Brown Band	
2	1	2	"Church Bells"	Carrie Underwood	
7	1	1	"Confession"	Florida Georgia Line	
18	12	30	"Country Nation"	Brad Paisley	
4	—	—	"Darlin' Don't Go"	Sundance Head	
7	1	8	"Dibs"	Kelsea Ballerini	
1	1	1	"Die a Happy Man"	Thomas Rhett	
3	1	1	"Different for Girls"	Dierks Bentley featuring Elle King	
2	2	1	"Drunk on Your Love"	Brett Eldredge	
10	1	8	"Fix"	Chris Lane	
1	32	34	"Forever Country"	Artists of Then, Now & Forever	
3	1	10	"From the Ground Up"	Dan + Shay	
13	—	—	"Go Ahead and Break My Heart"	Blake Shelton featuring Gwen Stefani	
4	1	2	"Head Over Boots"	Jon Pardi	
2	1	1	"Heartbeat"	Carrie Underwood	
1	1	1	"H.O.L.Y."	Florida Georgia Line	
3	1	1	"Home Alone Tonight"	Luke Bryan featuring Karen Fairchild	
1	1	1	"Humble and Kind"	Tim McGraw	
2	1	1	"Huntin', Fishin' and Lovin' Every Day"	Luke Bryan	
5	6	22	"I Got the Boy"	Jana Kramer	
4	1	7	"I Know Somebody"	LoCash	
8	1	2	"I Like the Sound of That"	Rascal Flatts	
5	2	4	"I Love This Life"	LoCash	
8	2	13	"I Met a Girl"	William Michael Morgan	
18	—	—	"I'm Sorry"	Adam Wakefield	
19	—	—	"Islands in the Stream"	Emily Ann Roberts featuring Blake Shelton	
22	15	48	"It All Started with a Beer"	Frankie Ballard	
3	1	1	"It Don't Hurt Like It Used To"	Billy Currington	
18	—	—	"Jolene"	Pentatonix featuring Dolly Parton	
3	1	3	"Lights Come On"	Jason Aldean	
16	4	22	"Little Bit of You"	Chase Bryant	
5	1	2	"A Little More Summertime"	Jason Aldean	
20	12	37	"Livin' the Dream"	Drake White	
14	—	—	"Lonesome Broken and Blue"	Adam Wakefield	
19	14	—	"Lovin' Lately"	Big & Rich featuring Tim McGraw	
2	1	2	"Make You Miss Me"	Sam Hunt	
2	1	1	"May We All"	Florida Georgia Line featuring Tim McGraw	
3	1	3	"Middle of a Memory"	Cole Swindell	
8	1	8	"Mind Reader"	Dustin Lynch	
15	15	7	"Mr. Misunderstood"	Eric Church	
5	1	1	"Move"	Luke Bryan	
5	9	3	"My Church"	Maren Morris	
17	14	32	"Night's on Fire"	David Nail	
13	10	11	"Nobody to Blame"	Chris Stapleton	
14	6	5	"Noise"	Kenny Chesney	
1	1	4	"Peter Pan"	Kelsea Ballerini	
28	17	44	"Real Men Love Jesus"	Michael Ray	
2	1	1	"Record Year"	Eric Church	
9	2	16	"Rock On"	Tucker Beathard	
25	13	31	"Running for You"	Kip Moore	
1	1	1	"Setting the World on Fire"	Kenny Chesney featuring Pink	
8	7	2	"She's Got a Way with Words"	Blake Shelton	
3	2	7	"Sleep Without You"	Brett Young	
4	2	1	"Snapback"	Old Dominion	
1	1	1	"Somewhere on a Beach"	Dierks Bentley	
4	1	3	"Song for Another Time"	Old Dominion	
4	2	26	"Stay a Little Longer"	Brothers Osborne	
23	18	49	"Stone Cold Sober"	Brantley Gilbert	
3	1	1	"T-Shirt"	Thomas Rhett	
13	10	38	"That Don't Sound Like You"	Lee Brice	
2	1	1	"Think of You"	Chris Young duet with Cassadee Pope	
15	35	—	"Used to Love You Sober"	Kane Brown	
19	30	39	"Vacation"	Thomas Rhett	
2	11	4	"Vice"	Miranda Lambert	
3	1	1	"Wanna Be That Song"	Brett Eldredge	
4	1	1	"Wasted Time"	Keith Urban	
7	1	3	"We Went"	Randy Houser	
17	56	—	"Whisper"	Chase Rice	
23	16	11	"Without a Fight"	Brad Paisley featuring Demi Lovato	
12	1	1	"You Look Like I Need a Drink"	Justin Moore	
1	1	3	"You Should Be Here"	Cole Swindell	

=== Singles released by Canadian artists ===
Songs	Airplay	Canada	Single	Artist	References
—	—	1	"Autograph"	Dallas Smith	
—	—	10	"Be You"	High Valley	
—	—	18	"Beer Weather"	Cold Creek County	
—	—	17	"Bow Chicka Wow Wow"	Meghan Patrick	
—	—	6	"Bush Party"	Dean Brody	
—	44	14	"By the Way"	Lindsay Ell	
—	—	3	"Come on Down"	High Valley	
—	—	8	"Cool with That"	Brett Kissel	
—	—	8	"Daughters of the Sun"	George Canyon	
—	—	6	"Dirt Road in 'Em"	Aaron Pritchett	
—	—	9	"Down by the River"	Bobby Wills	
—	—	15	"Elevator"	Jess Moskaluke	
—	—	8	"Every Week's Got a Friday"	High Valley	
—	—	16	"Found"	Dan Davidson	
—	—	12	"Good Kinda Love"	Jojo Mason	
—	—	7	"Heard You in a Song"	Gord Bamford	
—	—	8	"Hearts on Fire"	Chad Brownlee	
—	—	16	"I Didn't Fall in Love with Your Hair"	Brett Kissel featuring Carolyn Dawn Johnson	
—	—	8	"I Got This"	George Canyon	
—	—	8	"I Hate You for It"	Chad Brownlee	
—	—	19	"Jealous of the Sun"	Tebey	
—	—	6	"Kids with Cars"	Dallas Smith	
—	—	3	"Lawn Chair Lazy"	James Barker Band	
—	—	4	"Love Would Be Enough"	Dean Brody	
—	—	10	"Maybe It's the Moonshine"	The Washboard Union	
—	—	19	"Mixtape"	Autumn Hill	
—	—	7	"Monterey"	Dean Brody	
—	—	5	"One Little Kiss"	Dallas Smith	
—	—	6	"Pick Me Up"	Brett Kissel	
—	—	9	"Red Dress"	Jojo Mason	
—	—	5	"Shot of Glory"	The Washboard Union	
—	—	11	"Spotlight"	Jason Blaine	
—	—	7	"Stompin' Ground"	Tim Hicks	
—	—	7	"Take Me Home"	Jess Moskaluke	
—	—	13	"War Paint"	Madeline Merlo	
—	—	10	"Whatcha Wanna Do About It"	Madeline Merlo	
—	—	9	"Won't You Be Mine"	Bobby Wills	

Notes

- "—" denotes releases that did not chart

== Top new album releases ==
The following albums placed on the Top Country Albums charts in 2016:

US	Album	Artist	Record label	Release date	Reference
10	The Album Collection	Joey + Rory	Vanguard/Sugar Hill	April 1	
3	All Night Party	Casey Donahew	Almost Country	August 19	
1	American Love	Jake Owen	RCA Nashville	July 29	
10	Behind This Guitar	Mo Pitney	Curb	October 7	
8	Big Day in a Small Town	Brandy Clark	Warner Bros. Nashville	June 10	
1	Black	Dierks Bentley	Capitol Nashville	May 27	
7	Boots on the Ground	Frank Foster	Lone Chief	January 15	
5	Bury Me in Boots	The Cadillac Three	Big Machine	August 5	
1	California Sunrise	Jon Pardi	Capitol Nashville	June 17	
9	Call Me Old-Fashioned	Bradley Walker	Gaither Music Group	September 23	
3	Chapter 1 (EP)	Kane Brown	RCA Nashville	March 18	
1	Christmas Together	Garth Brooks and Trisha Yearwood	Pearl/Gwendolyn	November 11	
3	Christmas Together / Gunslinger	Garth Brooks & Trisha Yearwood	Pearl/Gwendolyn	November 18	
5	CMA Awards 50 Zinepak	Various Artists	CMA/Zinepak	October 21	
1	Cosmic Hallelujah	Kenny Chesney	Blue Chair/Columbia	October 28	
4	The Critics Give It 5 Stars	Bobby Bones and the Raging Idiots	Black River	March 18	
4	Detour	Cyndi Lauper	Sire	May 6	
1	Dig Your Roots	Florida Georgia Line	BMLG	August 26	
5	Down Home Sessions III (EP)	Cole Swindell	Warner Bros. Nashville	October 28	
4	Down to My Last Bad Habit	Vince Gill	MCA Nashville	February 12	
2	The Driver	Charles Kelley	Capitol Nashville	February 5	
5	Dylan Scott	Dylan Scott	Curb	August 12	
9	El Río	Frankie Ballard	Warner Bros. Nashville	June 10	
6	Elvis: Way Down in the Jungle Room	Elvis Presley	RCA Legacy	August 5	
1	Farm Tour... Here's to the Farmer (EP)	Luke Bryan	Capitol Nashville	September 23	
3	Fighter	David Nail	MCA Nashville	July 15	
3	Fired Up	Randy Houser	Stoney Creek	March 11	
2	For Better, or Worse	John Prine	Oh Boy	September 30	
5	For the Good Times: A Tribute to Ray Price	Willie Nelson	Legacy	September 16	
4	Full Circle	Loretta Lynn	Legacy	March 4	
9	Girl Problems	Chris Lane	Big Loud	August 5	
2	Glow	Brett Eldredge	Atlantic Nashville	October 28	
2	Gotta Be Me	Cody Johnson	CoJo	August 5	
7	The Greatest Gift of All	Rascal Flatts	Big Machine	October 21	
4	Gunslinger	Garth Brooks	Pearl	November 25	
2	Full Of (Even More) Cheer	Home Free	Columbia	November 11	
1	Hero	Maren Morris	Columbia Nashville	June 3	
1	Hymns That Are Important to Us	Joey + Rory	Gaither Music Group	February 14	
1	If I'm Honest	Blake Shelton	Warner Bros. Nashville	May 20	
4	I'm Not the Devil	Cody Jinks	Thirty Tigers	August 12	
4	It Must Be Christmas	Chris Young	RCA Nashville	October 14	
2	It's About Time	Hank Williams, Jr.	Nash Icon	January 15	
1	Kane Brown	Kane Brown	RCA Nashville	December 2	
1	Kinda Don't Care	Justin Moore	Valory	August 12	
4	Lighter in the Dark	Sister Hazel	Croakin' Poets	February 19	
1	Like an Arrow	Blackberry Smoke	Rounder	October 14	
2	Love Remains	Hillary Scott & the Scott Family	EMI Nashville	July 29	
10	Midwest Farmer's Daughter	Margo Price	Third Man	March 25	
4	Mr. Misunderstood: On the Rocks, Live and (Mostly) Unplugged (EP)	Eric Church	EMI Nashville	November 4	
4	Mud	Whiskey Myers	Wiggy Thump	September 9	
10	Music Is Medicine	Marie Osmond	Oliveme	April 15	
7	My Kind of Christmas	Reba McEntire	Cracker Barrel/Nash Icon/Starstruck	September 6	
5	Nothing Shines Like Neon	Randy Rogers Band	Tommy Jackson	January 15	
5	Now That's What I Call Country #1's	Various Artists	Sony/Universal	November 4	
3	Now That's What I Call Country Volume 9	Various Artists	Universal	June 10	
2	Obsessed	Dan + Shay	Warner Bros. Nashville	June 3	
3	Pawn Shop	Brothers Osborne	EMI Nashville	January 15	
2	Playing with Fire	Jennifer Nettles	Big Machine	May 13	
1	Pure & Simple	Dolly Parton	Dolly/RCA Nashville	August 19	
2	Reckless	Martina McBride	Nash Icon	April 29	
9	Redneck Shit	Wheeler Walker, Jr.	Pepper Hill	February 12	
3	Remington	Granger Smith	Wheelhouse	March 4	
1	Ripcord	Keith Urban	Capitol Nashville	May 6	
1	A Sailor's Guide to Earth	Sturgill Simpson	Atlantic	April 15	
1	Sinner	Aaron Lewis	Dot	September 16	
5	Southern Family	Various Artists	Elektra Nashville	March 18	
4	Spark	Drake White	Dot	August 19	
3	Strait Out of the Box: Part 2	George Strait	MCA Nashville	November 18	
6	Swimmin' Pools, Movie Stars	Dwight Yoakam	Sugar Hill	September 23	
3	Tattooed Heart	Ronnie Dunn	Nash Icon	November 11	
1	They Don't Know	Jason Aldean	Broken Bow	September 9	
8	The Things That We Are Made Of	Mary Chapin Carpenter	Lambent Light	May 6	
6	'Tis the Season	Jimmy Buffett	Mailboat	October 28	
7	Trio: The Ultimate Collection	Dolly Parton, Linda Ronstadt and Emmylou Harris	Warner Bros. Nashville	September 9	
1	The Ultimate Collection	Garth Brooks	Pearl	November 11	
1	The Weight of These Wings	Miranda Lambert	RCA Nashville	November 18	
5	Vinyl	William Michael Morgan	Warner Bros. Nashville	September 30	
1	We're All Somebody from Somewhere	Steven Tyler	Dot	July 15	
2	You Should Be Here	Cole Swindell	Warner Bros. Nashville	May 6	

=== Other top albums ===
US	Album	Artist	Record label	Release date	Reference
49	And Then There's This...	The Grascals	Mountain Home	January 8	
16	All American Mutt	Jamie Kent	Road Dog	October 21	
35	All I've Been Through	Charlie Farley	BackRoad	April 8	
14	All Night Live, Volume 1	The Mavericks	Valory Music Co.	October 14	
42	Bad Mutha Fucka	Upchurch	RHEC	December 9	
19	The Bird & the Rifle	Lori McKenna	Thirty Tigers	July 29	
30	Boots No. 1: The Official Revival Bootleg	Gillian Welch	Acony	November 25	
12	Breathless	Sam Riggs	Deep Creek	February 19	
31	Brett Young	Brett Young	Republic Nashville	February 12	
46	Bringing Country Back	Zane Williams	Be Music & Entertainment	October 21	
30	Cayamo: Sessions at Sea	Buddy Miller	New West	January 29	
41	Celebrate Christmas	The Oak Ridge Boys	Gaither Music Group	October 21	
43	A Chrisley Christmas	Todd Chrisley	Holy Graffiti	November 4	
11	Circlin' Back, Celebrating 50 Years, Live at the Ryman Auditorium, TN	Nitty Gritty Dirt Band	NGDB/Warner Bros. Nashville	September 30	
13	Colvin & Earle	Colvin & Earle	Fantasy	June 10	
21	Coming to a Honky Tonk Near You	Kevin Fowler	Kevin Fowler	October 21	
50	A Country Boy Can Survive (Box Set)	Hank Williams, Jr.	Curb	October 21	
41	Couchville Sessions	Darrell Scott	Full Light	May 13	
42	Dance with Me (EP)	The Springs	CFC	June 10	
37	Dear Life	High Valley	Atlantic Nashville	November 18	
22	Deep Tracks	Faith Hill	Warner Bros. Nashville	November 18	
42	Del and Woody	Del McCoury Band	McCoury	April 15	
39	Deux (EP)	Megan and Liz	Hidden Cow	March 11	
11	Dirt on Us	Drew Baldridge	Cold River	June 10	
35	Down in a Hole	Kiefer Sutherland	Warner Bros. Nashville	August 19	
43	Drifted	Lenny Cooper	Backroad	October 28	
23	Exodus of Venus	Elizabeth Cook	Agent Love Records	June 17	
25	Extended Play (EP)	LANco	Arista Nashville	April 15	
14	Fight Like Hell (EP)	Tucker Beathard	Dot	October 7	
14	The Fighters	LoCash	Reviver Music	June 17	
44	Forever a Cowboy (EP)	Ned LeDoux	Powder River	December 2	
13	Good Country Music	Frank Foster	Lone Chief	October 28	
30	Heart of America	Upchurch	Johnny Cashville	January 15	
42	House on Fire	Ty Herndon	BFD	November 11	
38	Humble Folks	Flatland Cavalry	Flatland Cavalry	April 1	
13	I Am the Rain	Chely Wright	MRI Entertainment/Sony	September 9	
22	I Call BS on That (EP)	Buddy Brown	Buddy Brown Music	October 7	
27	I'm Leavin'	Elvis Presley	RCA/Legacy	April 15	
49	It's So Good Live	Sundy Best	eOne Entertainment	April 22	
25	Kid Sister	The Time Jumpers	Rounder	September 9	
44	Ladies & Gentlemen	Infamous Stringdusters	Compass	February 5	
47	Letting Go...Slow	Lorrie Morgan	Shanachie	February 12	
28	The Life & Songs of Emmylou Harris: An All-Star Concert Celebration	Various Artists	Rounder	November 11	
16	Live: American Outlaws	The Highwaymen	Legacy	May 20	
29	Live Dinner Reunion	Robert Earl Keen	Dualtone	November 18	
42	Long Way	Corey Kent White	Backwoods	May 27	
49	Lucky to Be Alive	Confederate Railroad	D&B Masterworks	July 15	
44	A Man and His Guitar: Live from the Franklin Theatre	Travis Tritt	Post Oak	November 18	
50	McGraw: The Ultimate Collection	Tim McGraw	Curb	October 21	
38	Midland (EP)	Midland	Big Machine	October 28	
24	Midnight Motel	Jack Ingram	Rounder	August 26	
12	The Music of Nashville: Season 4, Volume 2	Various Artists	Big Machine	May 13	
50	My Gospel	Paul Cauthen	Lightning Rod	October 14	
48	Never Enders	Lonestar	Shanachie	April 29	
23	New City Blues	Aubrie Sellers	Carnival	January 29	
29	New Lane Road	Josh Kelley	Sugar Hill	April 22	
42	Post Monroe (EP)	Post Monroe	KCH	May 13	
34	Precious Memories: Collection	Alan Jackson	EMI Nashville	November 25	
46	Rain Crow	Tony Joe White	Yep Roc	May 27	
39	Red, White & Blue (Live)	Van Zant	Loud & Proud	July 1	
41	Rx	Ryan Beaver	St. Beaver	May 6	
17	Shine on a Rainy Day	Brent Cobb	Elektra Nashville	October 7	
45	Simple (EP)	Travis Marvin	Independent	July 22	
43	Silent Night: A Country Christmas	Various Artists	Sony Music Nashville	August 23	
38	Steve Moakler (EP)	Steve Moakler	Creative Nation	March 11	
11	Strait for the Holidays	George Strait	MCA Nashville	October 28	
14	Summer (EP)	Cassadee Pope	Republic Nashville	June 3	
12	Sunset Motel	Reckless Kelly	Thirty Tigers	September 23	
25	Tailgate Country	Soul Circus Cowboys	Kismet	February 26	
18	Then Sings My Soul: Songs for My Mother	Wade Bowen	Bowen Sounds	March 18	
49	Thin Line	Billy Ray Cyrus	Blue Cadillac	September 9	
19	Timeless (EP)	The Swon Brothers	TSB	January 29	
13	To Celebrate Christmas	Jennifer Nettles	Big Machine	October 28	
31	To Joey, with Love (Original Motion Picture Soundtrack)	Various Artists	Reunion	November 11	
44	Tougher	Lainey Wilson	Lone Chief	April 8	
22	Tradition Lives	Mark Chesnutt	Row Entertainment	July 8	
28	The Truth (EP)	Royal Bliss	Royal Bliss	June 3	
12	Turning Point	Chuck Wicks	Blaster	February 26	
40	The Ultimate Collection	Roy Orbison	Legacy	October 28	
12	Underground (EP)	Kip Moore	MCA Nashville	October 28	
24	Up At Night	Cimorelli	Cimorelli	May 18	
22	The Very Best of the Highwaymen	The Highwaymen	Legacy	May 20	
11	A Very Kacey Christmas	Kacey Musgraves	Mercury Nashville	October 28	
28	The Voice: The Complete Season 10 Collection	Adam Wakefield	Republic	May 24	
36	The Voice: The Complete Season 11 Collection	Sundance Head	Republic	December 9	
21	Watch This	Wade Bowen and Randy Rogers	Lil' Buddy Toons	June 3	
48	Wayfaring Strangers: Cosmic American Music	Various Artists	Numero	March 18	
13	We the People	Big Smo	Elektra Nashville	July 22	
47	Which Way Is Up	Jackson Taylor & the Sinners	Sin House	June 3	
26	White Christmas Blue	Loretta Lynn	Legacy	October 7	
16	A Whole Lot More to Me	Craig Morgan	Black River	June 3	
28	William Michael Morgan EP	William Michael Morgan	Warner Bros. Nashville	March 18	
48	Wrong Side of the River	Rob Baird	Hard Luck	May 13	
14	Wynonna & the Big Noise	Wynonna	Curb	February 12	
14	Yours, EP	Russell Dickerson	Dent	January 18	
25	Zach Seabaugh (EP)	Zach Seabaugh	Open Roads Highway	June 1	
37	17 (EP)	Dylan Schneider	Dylan Schneider	October 9	

== Deaths ==
- January 8 – Red Simpson, 81, singer-songwriter best known for the 1971 hit "I'm a Truck." (heart attack)
- January 18 – Glenn Frey, 67, founding member of the Eagles (numerous complications)
- February 22 – Sonny James, 87, singer and Country Music Hall of Fame member (natural causes).
- March 4 – Joey Martin Feek, 40, one-half of husband-and-wife duo Joey + Rory (cervical cancer)
- March 9 – Ray Griff, 75, Canadian singer-songwriter (aspiration pneumonia)
- March 18 – Ned Miller, 90, singer of the 1960s, best known for "From a Jack to a King."
- April 6 – Merle Haggard, 79, singer-songwriter with many hits between the 1960s and 1980s, known as a pioneer of the Bakersfield sound (pneumonia).
- May 16 – Emilio Navaira, 53, Tejano and country music singer, best known for the 1995 hit "It's Not the End of the World" (heart attack).
- May 17 – Guy Clark, 74, singer-songwriter best known for hits recorded by Rodney Crowell, Ricky Skaggs, Steve Wariner and others (cancer).
- June 23 – Ralph Stanley, 89, legendary bluegrass pioneer who was a member of The Stanley Brothers and the Grand Ole Opry (skin cancer)
- July 16 – Bonnie Brown, 77, member of The Browns (lung cancer)
- August 5 – Richard Fagan, 69, songwriter best known for co-writing two of John Michael Montgomery's number one hits: "Sold (The Grundy County Auction Incident)" and "Be My Baby Tonight" (liver cancer).
- September 1 – Kacey Jones, 66, singer-songwriter and humorist, writer of the Mickey Gilley hit "I'm the One Mama Warned You About", cancer.
- September 21 – John D. Loudermilk, 82, singer and songwriter.
- September 25 – Jean Shepard, 82, pioneering female country artist and the only woman to be a member of the Opry for sixty years (Parkinson's disease).
- October 30 – Curly Putman, 85, songwriter, known for writing or co-writing classics such as "Green, Green Grass of Home", "D-I-V-O-R-C-E" and "He Stopped Loving Her Today".
- November 14 – Holly Dunn, 59, singer-songwriter and former Opry member best known for this hits "Daddy's Hands", "Are You Ever Gonna Love Me" and "You Really Had Me Going" (ovarian cancer).
- December 2 – Mark Gray, 64, singer-songwriter and member of Exile from 1979 and 1982.
- December 18 – Gordie Tapp, 94, comedian and longtime cast member of the television series Hee Haw.
- December 29 - Billy Joe Burnette, 75, co-writer of Red Sovine's "Teddy Bear"

== Hall of Fame inductees ==
=== Bluegrass Music Hall of Fame Inductees ===
- Ken Irwin
- Marian Leighton-Levy
- Bill Nowlin
- Clarence White

=== Country Music Hall of Fame inductees ===
- Fred Foster, music executive and founder of Monument Records (born 1931).
- Charlie Daniels, singer-songwriter and musician (born 1936).
- Randy Travis, singer-songwriter and leading figure in the neotraditionalist movement of the 1980s (born 1959).

=== Canadian Country Music Hall of Fame inductees ===
- Murray McLauchlan
- Paul Mascioli

== Major awards ==
=== Academy of Country Music ===
(presented April 2, 2017 in Las Vegas)

- Entertainer of the Year – Jason Aldean
- Top Male Vocalist – Thomas Rhett
- Top Female Vocalist – Miranda Lambert
- Top Vocal Group – Little Big Town
- Top Vocal Duo – Brothers Osborne
- New Male Vocalist – Jon Pardi
- New Female Vocalist – Maren Morris
- New Vocal Duo or Group – Brothers Osborne
- Album of the Year – The Weight of These Wings, Miranda Lambert
- Single Record of the Year – "H.O.L.Y.", Florida Georgia Line
- Song of the Year – "Die a Happy Man", Thomas Rhett
- Video of the Year – "Forever Country", Artists of Then, Now & Forever
- Vocal Event of the Year – "May We All", Florida Georgia Line feat. Tim McGraw

ACM Honors
(presented August 30, 2016)

- Career Achievement Award – Glen Campbell
- Cliffie Stone Pioneer Award – Crystal Gayle, The Statler Brothers and Tanya Tucker
- Jim Reeves International Award – Jeff Walker
- Merle Haggard Spirit Award – Miranda Lambert
- Poet's Award – Jimmy Webb and Eddie Rabbitt
- Crystal Milestone Award – Little Big Town
- Mae Boren Axton Award – Keith Urban
- Gary Harber Lifting Lives Award – Carrie Underwood
- Songwriter of the Year – Ross Copperman

=== Americana Music Honors & Awards ===
- Album of the Year – Something More Than Free (Jason Isbell)
- Artist of the Year – Chris Stapleton
- Duo/Group of the Year – Emmylou Harris and Rodney Crowell
- Song of the Year – "24 frames" (Jason Isbell)
- Emerging Artist of the Year – Margo Price
- Instrumentalist of the Year – Sara Watkins
- Spirit of Americana/Free Speech Award – Billy Bragg
- Lifetime Achievement: Trailblazer – Shawn Colvin
- Lifetime Achievement: Songwriting – William Bell
- Lifetime Achievement: Performance – Bob Weir

=== American Country Countdown Awards ===
(presented May 1 in Los Angeles)

- Artist of the Year – Luke Bryan
- Male Vocalist of the Year – Luke Bryan
- Female Vocalist of the Year – Carrie Underwood
- Group/Duo of the Year – Florida Georgia Line
- Song of the Year – "Die a Happy Man", Thomas Rhett
- Album of the Year – Traveller, Chris Stapleton
- Digital Song of the Year – "Girl Crush", Little Big Town
- Digital Album of the Year – Montevallo, Sam Hunt
- Breakthrough Male of the Year – Sam Hunt
- Breakthrough Female of the Year – Kelsea Ballerini
- Breakthrough Group/Duo of the Year – Old Dominion
- Touring Artist of the Year – Garth Brooks
- Nash Icon – Brooks & Dunn

=== American Music Awards ===
(presented in November 20 in Los Angeles)

- Favorite Country Male Artist – Blake Shelton
- Favorite Country Female Artist – Carrie Underwood
- Favorite Country Album – Storyteller, Carrie Underwood
- Favorite Country Song – "Humble and Kind", Tim McGraw

=== ARIA Awards ===
(presented in Sydney on November 23, 2016)

- Best Country Album – Silos (Sara Storer)

=== Canadian Country Music Association ===
(presented September 11 in London, Ontario)

- Fans' Choice Awards – Brett Kissel
- Album of the Year – Tin Roof, Gord Bamford
- Female Artist of the Year – Jess Moskaluke
- Male Artist of the Year – Brett Kissel
- Group or Duo of the Year – High Valley
- Single of the Year – "Bring Down the House", Dean Brody
- CMT Video of the Year – "Bring Down the House", Dean Brody
- Songwriter of the Year – Dean Brody ("Bring Down the House")
- Roots Artist of the Year – The Washboard Union
- Interactive Artist of the Year – Brett Kissel
- Rising Star – The Washboard Union

=== Country Music Association ===
(presented November 2 in Nashville)

- Entertainer of the Year – Garth Brooks
- Single of the Year – "Die a Happy Man", Thomas Rhett
- Male Vocalist of the Year – Chris Stapleton
- Female Vocalist of the Year – Carrie Underwood
- New Artist of the Year – Maren Morris
- Musical Event of the Year – "Different for Girls", Dierks Bentley featuring Elle King
- Album of the Year – Mr. Misunderstood, Eric Church
- Music Video of the Year – "Fire Away", Chris Stapleton
- Song of the Year – "Humble and Kind", Lori McKenna
- Vocal Duo of the Year – Brothers Osborne
- Vocal Group of the Year – Little Big Town
- Musician of the Year – Dann Huff
- Willie Nelson Lifetime Achievement Award – Dolly Parton
- Pinnacle Award – Kenny Chesney

=== CMT Music Awards ===
(presented on June 8 in Nashville)

- Video of the Year – "Humble and Kind", Tim McGraw
- Male Video of the Year – "Die a Happy Man", Thomas Rhett
- Female Video of the Year – "Smoke Break", Carrie Underwood
- Group/Duo Video of the Year – "Girl Crush", Little Big Town
- Breakthrough Video of the Year – "Fire Away", Chris Stapleton
- CMT Performance of the Year – "Smoke Break", Carrie Underwood from Instant Jam
- CMT Social Superstar – Blake Shelton

CMT Artists of the Year
(presented on October 20, 2016, in Nashville)

- Kelsea Ballerini
- Luke Bryan
- Florida Georgia Line
- Thomas Rhett
- Chris Stapleton
- Carrie Underwood

=== Grammy Awards ===
(presented February 12, 2017 in Los Angeles)

- Best Country Solo Performance – My Church (Maren Morris)
- Best Country Duo/Group Performance – Jolene (Pentatonix ft. Dolly Parton)
- Best Country Song – Humble and Kind (Lori McKenna)
- Best Country Album – A Sailor's Guide to Earth (Sturgill Simpson)
- Best Bluegrass Album – Coming Home (Mark O'Connor Band)
- Best Americana Album – This Is Where I Live (William Bell)
- Best American Roots Performance – House of Mercy (Sarah Jarosz)
- Best American Roots Song – Kid Sister (Vince Gill)
- Best Roots Gospel Album – Hymns That Are Important to Us (Joey + Rory)

=== Juno Awards ===
(presented April 2, 2017 in Ottawa)

- Country Album of the Year – Kiss Me Quiet (Jess Moskaluke)

== See also ==
- Country Music Association
- Inductees of the Country Music Hall of Fame
