= LoCash discography =

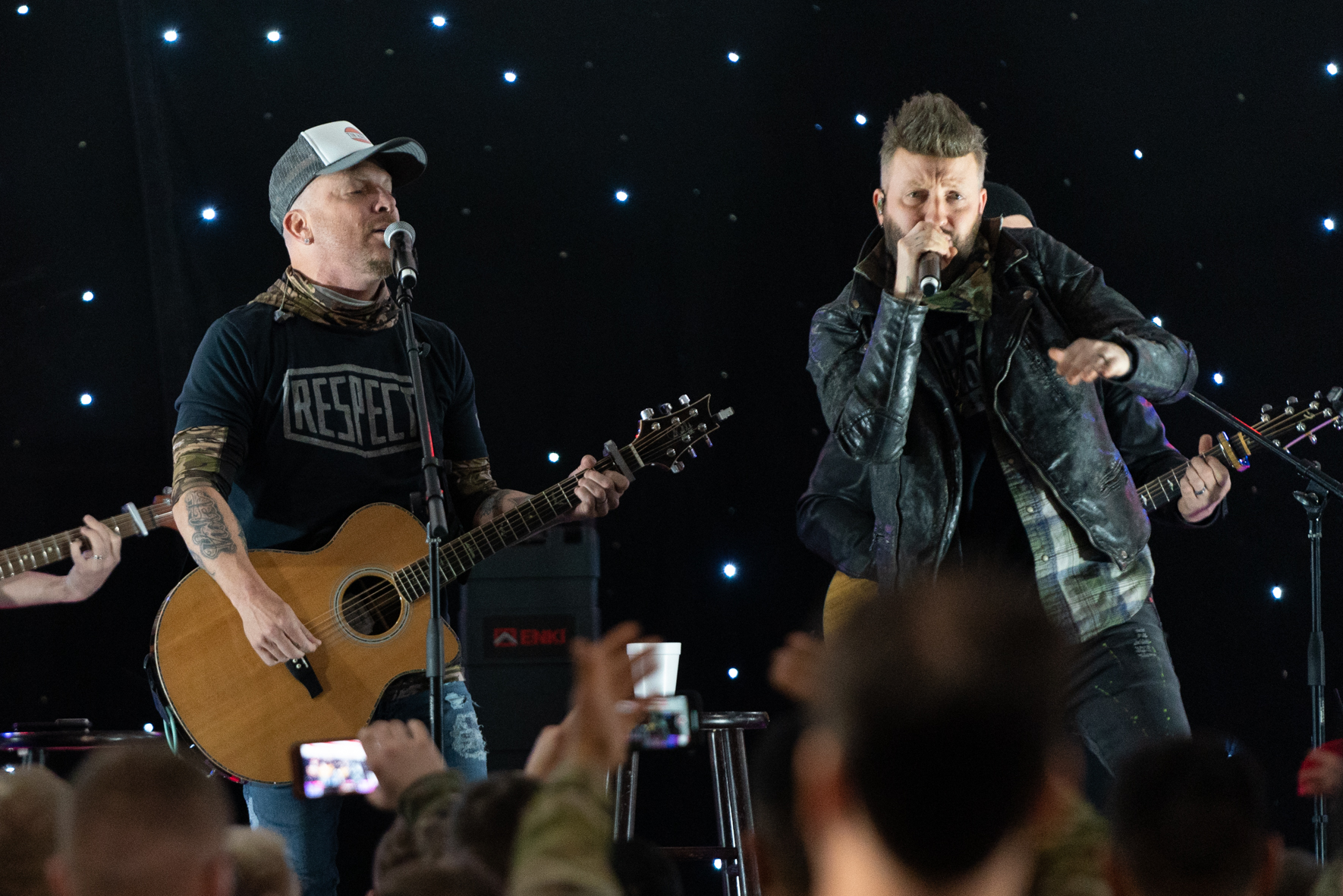
- LoCash in 2020.
- Studio albums: 5
- EPs: 2
- Singles: 17

American country music duo LoCash has released five studio albums, two extended plays, and sixteen singles. Originally known as LoCash Cowboys, the duo released the singles "Here Comes Summer", "Keep in Mind", and "You Got Me" for R&J Records prior to the label's closure. "Chase a Little Love" and "Best Seat in the House" were released as singles for a self-titled album on Average Joes Entertainment in 2013.

After shortening their name to LoCash, the duo broke through in 2015 and 2016 with "I Love This Life" and "I Know Somebody" on Reviver Records, with the latter being their first number-one single on Country Airplay.

== Studio albums ==
Title	Album details	Peak chart positions			Sales
Title	Album details	US	US Country	US Indie	Sales
LoCash Cowboys	Release date: November 21, 2008; Label: Self-released	—	—	—	
LoCash Cowboys	Release date: June 18, 2013; Label: Average Joes	97	25	22	
The Fighters	Release date: June 17, 2016; Label: Reviver	131	14	—	US: 20,600
Brothers	Release date: March 29, 2019; Label: Wheelhouse	—	34	—	US: 4,600
Bet the Farm	Release date: April 18, 2025; Label: Galaxy	—	—	—	
Chris & Preston	Release date: October 23, 2026; Label: Galaxy	—	—	—	
"—" denotes releases that did not chart

== Extended plays ==
Title	EP details	Peak positions	Sales
Title	EP details	US Country	Sales
I Love This Life	Release date: October 30, 2015; Label: Reviver	38	US: 9,200
Woods & Water	Release date: November 6, 2021; Label: Wheelhouse	—	
Let the Country Music Play	Release date: August 7, 2026; Label: Galaxy	—	
"—" denotes releases that did not chart

== Singles ==
Year	Title	Peak chart positions					Certifications (sales threshold)	Album
Year	Title	US	US Country	US Country Airplay	CAN	CAN Country	Certifications (sales threshold)	Album
2010	"Here Comes Summer" (Note: Single credited to LoCash Cowboys.)	—	41		—	—		This Is How We Do It (unreleased)
2010	"Keep in Mind"	—	34		—	—		—N/a
2011	"You Got Me"	—	52		—	—		This Is How We Do It (unreleased)
2012	"C.O.U.N.T.R.Y."	—	—	—	—	—		LoCash Cowboys (2013)
2013	"Chase a Little Love"	—	—	54	—	—		LoCash Cowboys (2013)
2013	"Best Seat in the House"	—	—	52	—	—		LoCash Cowboys (2013)
2015	"I Love This Life"	56	5	2	74	4	RIAA: Platinum	The Fighters
2016	"I Know Somebody"	52	4	1	94	7	RIAA: Gold	The Fighters
2016	"Ring on Every Finger"	— (Note: "Ring on Every Finger" did not enter the Billboard Hot 100, but peaked at number 12 on the Bubbling Under Hot 100 Singles chart.)	22	16	—	35		The Fighters
2018	"Don't Get Better Than That"	—	—	44	—	—		—N/a
2018	"Feels Like a Party"	—	40	26	—	48		Brothers
2019	"One Big Country Song"	50	8	2	86	1	RIAA: Gold	Brothers
2020	"Beers to Catch Up On"	—	—	45	—	—		Brothers
2022	"Beach Boys" (featuring Mike Love and Bruce Johnston)	—	—	58	—	—		Woods & Water
2022	"Let It Slide" (featuring Blanco Brown and Leslie Jordan)	—	—	—	—	—		—N/a
2024	"Hometown Home"	91	21	1	—	34		Bet the Farm
2025	"Wrong Hearts"	—	—	21	—	59		Bet the Farm
2026	"Talkin' 'Bout"	—	—	49	—	—		Chris & Preston
"—" denotes releases that did not chart

== Music videos ==
Year	Video	Director
2013	"Chase a Little Love"	Travis Nicholson
2013	"Best Seat in the House"	Daniel Henry
2015	"I Love This Life"	Stokes Nielson
2016	"I Know Somebody"	Ry & Drew Cox
2019	"One Big Country Song"	TK McKamy
2022	"Let It Slide" (featuring Leslie Jordan and Blanco Brown)	Mason Dixon
2023	"Three Favorite Colors"	Joe Sir
