= I Love This Life =

I Love This Life may refer to:

- "I Love This Life" (Kim Cesarion song)
- I Love This Life (EP), by LoCash
  - "I Love This Life" (LoCash song), its title track
- Song by The Blue Nile
