= Country Soul =

Country Soul might relate to :

- Country Soul (Glen Campbell album), 1968 compilation
- Country Soul (Hayley Jensen album), 2025
