= I Love This Life (EP) =

EP by LoCash
- Released: October 30, 2015
- Genre: Country
- Length: 18:40
- Label: Reviver Music
- Producer: Lindsay Rimes, David Ross (exec.)

LoCash chronology
LoCash Cowboys (2013)	I Love This Life (2015)	The Fighters (2016)

Singles from I Love This Life
- 1. "I Love This Life" Released: February 23, 2015; 2. "I Know Somebody" Released: February 22, 2016

I Love This Life is an EP by American country music duo LoCash. It is their first release for Reviver Music, and its title track is the duo's first Top 10 hit on Country Airplay.

== History ==
The duo, formerly known as LoCash Cowboys, signed to Reviver Music in 2015 and released "I Love This Life". They announced the EP's release to digital outlets in October 2015. Chris Lucas, one-half of the duo, said, "It’s a new and established sound for us. Something fresh, with the LoCash flavor and the roots of country music". On October 19, the duo previewed the EP at a listening party at the Roy Orbison Building in Nashville, Tennessee. The EP consists of six tracks, five of which were co-written by at least one half of the duo.

== Critical reception ==
Giving it a "B+", Tammy Ragusa of Nash Country Weekly wrote that "There's a great energy to I Love This Life that makes the title track the perfect introduction to the rest of the album." She praised the production and lyrics of "Shipwrecked" and "Till the Wheels Fall Off", but criticized the production of other tracks, saying that "when the songs are this well-written, it's easy to overlook a little studio sleight of hand".

== Track listing ==
1. "I Love This Life" (Preston Brust, Chris Lucas, Chris Janson, Danny Myrick) — 3:28
2. "I Know Somebody" (Ross Copperman, Jeremy Stover, Rhett Akins) — 3:17
3. "Shipwrecked" (Brust, Michael Tyler, Lindsay Rimes) — 2:54
4. "Ain't Startin' Tonight" (Brust, Jaron Boyer, Michael Tyler) — 2:50
5. "Drunk Drunk" (Brust, Lucas, Brian Niemi, Stevens Stokes) — 2:57
6. "Till the Wheels Fall Off" (Brust, Boyer, Matt Bronleewe) — 3:05

== Chart performance ==
The EP debuted at No. 38 on the Top Country Albums chart, selling 1,400 copies in the first week. It has sold 9,200 copies in the US as of March 2016.

Chart (2015)	Peak position
US Top Country Albums (Billboard)	38
