= Talking to Myself =

Intrapersonal communication is a communicator's internal use of language or thought.

Talking to Myself may also refer to:

== Books ==
- Talking to Myself, by Pearl Bailey (1971)
- Talking to Myself, by Studs Terkel (1973)

== Television ==
- Talking to Myself, Season 4 Episode 20 The Lizzie Bennet Diaries
- Talking to Myself, Season 1 Episode 5 Wonderful You (TV series)

== Music ==
- Talking to Myself (album), by Patricia Conroy 2007
- "Talking to Myself" (song), by Linkin Park 2017
- "Talking to Myself", song by Michael Brecker from Don't Try This at Home (Michael Brecker album)
- "Talking to Myself", song by Glenn Campbell from Country Music Star No. 1
- "Talking to Myself", single by Cousteau (band)
- "Talking to Myself", song by Strung Out from Another Day in Paradise (album)
- "Talking to Myself", single by Terraplane (band) 1985
- "Talking to Myself", song by Vinnie Barrett
- "Talking to Myself", song by Gallant from Ology (album)
- "Talking To Myself" (Korean: 혼잣말) Lee Tae-sung
- "Talking to Myself", song by DJ Rap
- "Talking to Myself", song by the Adolescents from La Vendetta... 2014
- "Talking to Myself", song by George Watsky 2016
- "Talking to Myself", single by Otis Williams and the Charms 1957
- "Talking to Myself", song by Eminem from Recovery 2010
- "Talking to Myself", song by the Linda Lindas from Growing Up 2022
