= Star of the Show =

Single by Thomas Rhett

from the album Tangled Up
- Released: October 3, 2016
- Recorded: 2015
- Genre: Country; R&B
- Length: 3:02
- Label: Valory
- Songwriter(s): Thomas Rhett; Rhett Akins; Ben Hayslip
- Producer(s): Joe London; Julian Bunetta; Thomas Rhett

Thomas Rhett singles chronology
"Vacation" (2016)	"Star of the Show" (2016)	"Craving You" (2017)

"Star of the Show" is a song recorded by American country music singer Thomas Rhett. It was released to country radio on October 3, 2016 via Valory Music Group as the fifth single from his second studio album, Tangled Up. Rhett wrote the song with his father Rhett Akins and Ben Hayslip. The song is featured on the 2016 deluxe edition of the album.

== Critical reception ==
Billy Dukes of Taste of Country wrote that "the guitar licks and Rhett's bashful delivery stay true to songs on his latest album, especially "Die a Happy Man," and also praised the songwriters for painting "vivid, relatable pictures." Kelly Brickey of Sounds Like Nashville described the love song as "swoon-worthy and groovy enough to warrant radio airplay."

== Commercial performance ==
"Star of the Show" was the most-added song at American country radio the week of its release and debuted at number 38 on the Billboard Country Airplay chart dated October 15, 2016. It has since become Rhett's seventh number one single. The song also debuted at number 21 on the Hot Country Songs chart dated October 22, 2016. It also debuted at number 88 on the US Billboard Hot 100 chart for the week of November 22, 2016. The song has sold 249,000 copies in the United States as of March 2017.

In Canada, the song debuted at number 37 on Canada Country chart for the week of November 30, 2016.

== Music video ==
The music video was directed by Roger Pistole and premiered on CMT, GAC and Vevo in November 2016.

== Chart performance ==
=== Weekly charts ===
Chart (2016–2017)	Peak position
Canada (Canadian Hot 100)	77
Canada Country (Billboard)	1
US Billboard Hot 100	45
US Country Airplay (Billboard)	1
US Hot Country Songs (Billboard)	4

=== Year-end charts ===
Chart (2016)	Position
US Hot Country Songs (Billboard)	99

Chart (2017)	Position
Canada Country (Billboard)	30
US Country Airplay (Billboard)	45
US Hot Country Songs (Billboard)	36
US Radio Songs (Billboard)	75

== Certifications ==
Region	Certification	Certified units/sales
United States (RIAA)	Gold	249,000

== Release history ==
Country	Date	Format	Label	Ref.
Worldwide	September 30, 2016	Digital download	Valory	
United States	October 3, 2016	Country radio	Valory	
