= Breakin' Hearts =

Studio album by Hayley Jensen
- Released: 22 October 2021
- Length: 32:31
- Label: Social Family Records
- Producer: Troy Kokol, Dan Davidson, Joe Nino-Hernes

Hayley Jensen chronology
Turning Up the Dial (2018)	Breakin' Hearts (2021)	Country Soul (2025)

Singles from Breakin' Hearts
- 1. "Angel" Released: February 2020; 2. "Breakin' Hearts" Released: August 2020; 3. "Fireworks" Released: 6 November 2020; 4. "Just Gonna Party" Released: March 2021; 5. "Karma" Released: May 2021; 6. "Better Than That" Released: February 2022; 7. "Shake My Bones" Released: June 2022; 8. "Four Boots" Released: September 2022

Breakin' Hearts is the fourth studio album by Australian singer-songwriter Hayley Jensen. The album was announced in September 2021 and released in October 2021. It debuted and peaked at number 25 on the ARIA Charts.

Upon announcement Jensen said "The creation of Breakin' Hearts was one of the most hands-on and enjoyable creative experiences of my life. A true labour of love, conceived during a period of global uncertainty and isolation. The production process spanned two continents, three countries, multiple time zones and pushed technology to its limits. Every story told through these songs is charged with emotion and grit - just like me."

== Reception ==
Sophie Hamley from Sunburnt Country Music called Jensen "A singer whose voice has enough power to front a very loud band and enough subtlety to be just as captivating with an acoustic guitar and nothing else. So it is very easy to spend every minute you're listening to Breakin' Hearts solely appreciating her voice, then playing the album over and over again so you can appreciate it more."

Velvet Thunder said "Jensen has a beautiful voice and a truly inspirational delivery and reminds very much of Shania Twain and if she can get anywhere near to her success then she will be one remarkable lady. Yes, this is a country album full of emotionally charged ballads but there are plenty of up-tempo country rockers to get those toes tapping too and you will soon be singing along to her tunes with gusto. Hayley Jensen has the look and sound of the latest star out of Nashville and simply has talent top spare."

== Track listing ==
Breakin' Hearts
No.	Title	Writer(s)	Length
1.	"Breakin' Hearts"	Hayley Jensen, Troy Kokol, Chris O'Neill	3:05
2.	"Shot Down"	Jensen, Kokol	2:44
3.	"Just Gonna Party"	Jensen, Kokol, O'Neill	3:18
4.	"Karma"	Warner, Joni Delaurier	3:14
5.	"Better Than That"	Warner, Clayton Bellamy	2:43
6.	"Four Boots" (featuring Clayton Bellamy)	Warner, Bellamy, Dan Davidson	3:04
7.	"Shake My Bones"	Warner, Tallus Scott, Jordan Welbourne	3:36
8.	"Rules"	Warner, Delaurier	3:36
9.	"Fireworks"	Warner, Phil Barton, Dana Heaton-Perdue	2:58
10.	"Angel" (featuring Beccy Cole)	Sarah McLachlan	4:18
Total length:			32:31

== Charts ==
Weekly chart performance for Breakin' Hearts
Chart (2021)	Peak position
Australian Albums (ARIA)	25
