= Solo Icon =

Solo Idol Finalists

Idol 2006 finalists
- McPherson Baea Winner

Idol 2007 finalists
- Fay Indu Winner

Idol 2008 finalists
- David Auna Winner
- Becky Maetia Runner-up
- Philip Carlos 2nd runner-up

Idol 2009 finalists
- Jeddy Dyer Winner

Idol 2010 finalists
- Josh Bshaller Pa'ahanua Winner

Idol 2011 finalists
- Grace Andrew Winner
- Annet Auga Runner-up
- Jimmy Kalua'ae 2nd runner-up

Solo Icon, formerly Solo Idol, is a Solomon Islands yearly singing competition, established in 2006 but not part of the Idol franchise. McPherson Baea won the inaugural competition, and Fay Indu was the winner of Solo Idol in 2007. David Auna won Solo Idol 2008, and Jeddy Dyer was the winner in 2009; Solo Icon 2010 was won by Joshua Bshaller Pa'ahanua.

The competition was named "Solo Idol" from 2006 to 2008, but changed its name to "Solo Icon" in 2009.

== 2008 Idol ==
The 2008 Solo Idol competition was jointly organised by the Ministry of Women, Youth and Children's Affairs, and the Global Leadership Youth Nexus (GLYN). The theme was "I am a Nation Builder".

2004 Australian Idol finalist Hayley Jensen participated, "conducting a workshop with the finalists" according to a representative of the organising committee. Jensen's participation was assisted by the Australian High Commission in Honiara, with the aim of "foster[ing] relationships between Australian and Solomon Islands' artists".

The final was held on 7 September. David Auna won with the song "Angels brought me here", by Guy Sebastian. There was subsequently some criticism due to his brother being one of the four judges. Becky Maetia was runner-up, while Philip Carlos was second runner-up.

A junior competition was also held, which Rachael Sarei won with the song "Power of Love" by Celine Dion. Runners-up were Richy Saeni and Betsy Luitolo.

== 2009 Icon ==
The 2009 edition received support from Australia, which provided a cheque for SI$30,000. The Australian High Commission in Honiara also arranged for Kelvin Fahey, President of Hardrush Music, to "work with finalists on song writing and marketing". Fahey would also provide the competition's winner with a recording contract, for a CD to be distributed in the Solomon Islands and in Australia. The Solomon Times described this as "a huge opportunity to put Solomon Islands music on a world stage".

The winner was Jeddy Dyer, performing his self-composed song "Say No". The following year, he travelled to Australia to record his début album at Woodhead Studios.

== 2010 Icon ==
In the senior category, the following qualified for the semi-finals: Rexford Haro, Kevin Kahui, Josh Bshaller, Robert Ne’e, Shelton Pio, Dinah Sinah, Willy Salu, Daniel Joel and Spain Onorio. In the junior category, the qualifiers for the semi-final were Iyvon Sitobata, Kenny James, Luke Allen, Manddy Maggie and Angellar Raha.

Joshua Bshaller won the competition, and a flight to Australia to "record his first album with Australian music producer Kelvin Fahey of Hardrush Music".
