= One Big Country Song =

2019 single by LoCash

Single by LoCash

from the album Brothers
- Released: May 13, 2019
- Genre: Country
- Length: 3:19
- Label: Wheelhouse
- Songwriter(s): Ashley Gorley; Jesse Frasure; Michael Hardy
- Producer(s): Tyler Hubbard; Corey Crowder

LoCash singles chronology
"Feels Like a Party" (2019)	"One Big Country Song" (2019)	"Beers to Catch Up On" (2020)

"One Big Country Song" is a song recorded by American country music duo LoCash. It is the second single from their third studio album Brothers. Jesse Frasure, Ashley Gorley and Michael Hardy wrote the song.

== Content ==
Tyler Hubbard of Florida Georgia Line co-produced it with Corey Crowder.

Chris Parton of the blog Sounds Like Nashville said that the song is about "focusing on the things we share in common – from the drive to succeed to the need to unwind every weekend." Billy Dukes of Taste of Country said of the song that "Chris Lucas and Preston Brust find unity in our shared experiences over a strikingly simple guitar riff."

== Music video ==
TK McKamy directed the song's corresponding video, which features disembodied boots and hats in various scenes.

== Chart performance ==
=== Weekly charts ===
Chart (2019–2020)	Peak position
Canada (Canadian Hot 100)	76
Canada Country (Billboard)	1
US Billboard Hot 100	50
US Country Airplay (Billboard)	2
US Hot Country Songs (Billboard)	8

=== Year-end charts ===
Chart (2020)	Position
US Country Airplay (Billboard)	27
US Hot Country Songs (Billboard)	38

== Certifications ==
Region	Certification	Certified units/sales
United States (RIAA)	Gold	500,000^{‡}
^{‡} Sales+streaming figures based on certification alone.
