= Vacation (Thomas Rhett song) =

Single by Thomas Rhett

from the album Tangled Up
- Released: June 13, 2016
- Recorded: 2015
- Genre: Country pop
- Length: 3:43 (album version); 3:28 (radio edit)
- Label: Valory
- Songwriters: Thomas Rhett; Thomas Allen; Harold Brown; Morris Dickerson; Sean Douglas; Gerry Goldstein; Leroy Jordan; Charles Miller; Lee Oskar; Andreas Schuller; Howard Scott; Joe Spargur; Ricky Reed; John Ryan
- Producers: Dann Huff; Jesse Frasure

Thomas Rhett singles chronology
| "T-Shirt" (2016) | "Vacation" (2016) | "Star of the Show" (2016) |

"Vacation" is a song recorded by American country music singer Thomas Rhett. It was released on June 13, 2016 via Valory Music Group as the fourth single from his second studio album, Tangled Up. The song was written by Rhett, Thomas Allen, Harold Brown, Morris Dickerson, Sean Douglas, Gerry Goldstein, Leroy Jordan, Charles Miller, Lee Oskar, Andreas Schuller, Howard Scott, Joe Spargur, Ricky Reed, and John Ryan. It features an interpolation of War's "Low Rider", and thus its writers are also credited.

== Music video ==
A music video for the song became available in August 2015 as part of a series of video releases in advance of the release of the album Tangled Up. Directed by TK McKamy and filmed at the same time as his video for "Die a Happy Man", it features Rhett on vacation with family and friends (including his wife Lauren) in Hawaii, participating in activities such as skydiving, surfing, lounging on the beach, and various random activities. The whole video is shot in the style of a home video, and was filmed entirely on a handheld camcorder. Rhett does not sing in the video; rather, several kids in the water (Rhett and Lauren's relatives, specifically) lip-sync the song throughout the video.

== Commercial performance ==
"Vacation" debuted on the chart at No. 50 on the Hot Country Songs for chart dated May 28, 2016, and entered the Country Airplay chart five weeks later at No. 45 when it was officially released to radio. It reached No. 19 on the Hot Country Songs chart on August 20, 2016 after being released as a promotional single. It later peaked at No. 30 on the Country Airplay chart. It was Rhett's first single to miss the top 20 and the lowest charting single of his career. As a result, it broke his streak of six consecutive No. 1 singles, although a new streak would be started with his next single, "Star of the Show". The song had sold 284,000 copies in the US as of October 2016.

== Chart performance ==
=== Weekly charts ===
| Chart (2016) | Peak position |
|---|---|
| Canada Country (Billboard) | 39 |
| US Bubbling Under Hot 100 (Billboard) | 1 |
| US Country Airplay (Billboard) | 30 |
| US Hot Country Songs (Billboard) | 19 |

=== Year-end charts ===
| Chart (2016) | Position |
|---|---|
| US Hot Country Songs (Billboard) | 72 |

== Certifications ==
| Region | Certification | Certified units/sales |
|---|---|---|
| United States (RIAA) | Platinum | 284,000 |
