= Hometown Home =

Single by LoCash

from the album Bet the Farm
- Released: April 19, 2024
- Genre: Country
- Length: 3:29
- Label: Galaxy; BBR
- Songwriters: Preston Brust; Chris Lucas; Zach Abend; Andy Albert
- Producer: Jacob Rice

LoCash singles chronology
"Let It Slide" (2022)	"Hometown Home" (2024)	"Wrong Hearts" (2025)

"Hometown Home" is a song by American country music duo LoCash. It was released on April 19, 2024, as the lead single from their fourth studio album, Bet the Farm (2025).

== History ==
LoCash announced the release of the song in April 2024. It is their first release for Galaxy Label Group, their own record label, in partnership with BBR Music Group.

Preston Brust and Chris Lucas, the two members of LoCash, co-wrote the song with Zach Abend and Andy Albert.

The duo followed the song's release with the announcement of a 2024 tour of the same name.

== Chart performance ==
"Hometown Home" peaked at number one on the Country Airplay chart the week ending April 12, 2025, making this LoCash's second number-one single, and their first since "I Know Somebody" in October 2016.

== Official versions ==
- Album version (3:29)
- The Front Porch Mix / acoustic version (3:24)
- Wedding Cake Mix (3:30)
- Hometown Hot Mix (3:15)

== Charts ==
=== Weekly charts ===
Weekly chart performance for "Hometown Home"
Chart (2024–2025)	Peak position
Canada Country (Billboard)	34
US Billboard Hot 100	91
US Adult Pop Airplay (Billboard)	18
US Country Airplay (Billboard)	1
US Hot Country Songs (Billboard)	21

=== Year-end charts ===
Year-end chart performance for "Hometown Home"
Chart (2025)	Position
US Country Airplay (Billboard)	7
US Hot Country Songs (Billboard)	70
