= Country Soul (Hayley Jensen album) =

Studio album by Hayley Jensen
- Released: 29 August 2025
- Length: 39:19
- Label: White Dove Music
- Producers: MSquared, Troy Kokol, Matt Fell, Leon Zervos

Hayley Jensen chronology
Breakin' Hearts (2021)	Country Soul (2025)

Singles from Country Soul
- 1. "Bring It On" Released: April 2023; 2. "Rock Bottom" Released: 14 July 2023; 3. "Stomping Ground" Released: 12 April 2024; 4. "Outskirts" Released: September 2024; 5. "Dirt Rich" Released: 28 February 2025; 6. "Giddy Up Cowboy" Released: 23 May 2025; 7. "Country Soul" Released: August 2025

Country Soul is the fifth studio album by Australian singer-songwriter Hayley Jensen. The album was announced in June 2025 and released in August 2025.. It debuted and peaked at number 14 on the ARIA Charts, her best charting album to date.

In July 2025, Jensen said, "Growing up in the country shaped every part of who I am. I've got a country soul, and that's something that never leaves you, no matter where life takes you. When the world gets loud or overwhelming, I know I can always head back home to the country and reconnect with who I truly am."

The album was launched in Gympie Music Muster in August 2025 and was followed by an Australian tour.

At the 2026 Country Music Awards of Australia, the album was nominated for Contemporary Country Album of the Year and Album of the Year. At the AIR Awards of 2026, it was nominated for Best Independent Country Album or EP.

== Reception ==
Sarah Duggan from Country Town said "Country Soul represents a career-defining moment for Hayley Jensen. This record is confident, versatile, unapologetically authentic and incredibly fun. It demonstrates the power of independence, the importance of creative control and the rewards of embracing one’s own voice."

ABC Country said "The album is a powerful and empowering, energetic collection of 13 tracks showcasing Jensen's signature grit, sass and soaring vocals, while the album's title track is an energetic, boot-tapping anthem about the country way of life, knowing where you come from, staying true to who you are."

== Track listing ==
Country Soul
No.	Title	Writer(s)	Length
1.	"Country Soul"	Hayley Warner, Michael Delorenzis, Michael Paynter	3:13
2.	"Stomping Ground"	Warner, Alexandra Adamoski Delorenzis, Tony Kokal, Paynter	2:41
3.	"Giddy Up Cowboy"	Warner, Sarah Grace Buckley, Nolan Wynne	2:50
4.	"Honey I Ain't Mad"	Warner, Tallus Scott, Jordan Welbourne	2:59
5.	"Dirt Rich"	Warner, Melanie Dyer, Wynee	2:58
6.	"Without You"	Warner, Dan Davidson, Delorenzis, Paynter	3:19
7.	"Sure Ain't Gold"	Warner, Delorenzis, Paynter	3:01
8.	"This Heart Ain't Big Enough"	Warner, Kokol	2:58
9.	"Outskirts"	Warner, Joni Delaurier	2:46
10.	"These Are the Good Times"	Warner, Delorenzis, Paynter, Anthony Snape	3:10
11.	"Rock Bottom"	Jensen, Kokol, O'Neill	3:08
12.	"Bing It On"	Warner, Delaurier	2:48
13.	"You Decide"	Warner, Delaurier	3:21
Total length:			39:19

== Charts ==
Weekly chart performance for Country Soul
Chart (2025)	Peak position
Australian Albums (ARIA)	14
