= Crash and Burn (Thomas Rhett song) =

Single by Thomas Rhett

from the album Tangled Up
- Released: April 27, 2015
- Recorded: 2015
- Genre: Country pop; R&B
- Length: 3:10
- Label: Valory
- Songwriter(s): Jesse Frasure; Chris Stapleton
- Producer(s): Dann Huff; Jesse Frasure

Thomas Rhett singles chronology
"Make Me Wanna" (2014)	"Crash and Burn" (2015)	"Die a Happy Man" (2015)

"Crash and Burn" is a song recorded by American country music singer Thomas Rhett. It was released to digital retailers on April 7, 2015 via Valory Music Group as the lead single to Rhett's second studio album, Tangled Up, and was released to country radio on April 27, 2015. The song was written by Jesse Frasure and Chris Stapleton.

== Background ==
The first song by Rhett about heartache, "Crash and Burn" tells the story of the narrator whose relationship falls apart. Prior to the song's release, Rhett admitted that he was worried about the feedback from fans about the new single because of its pop- and R&B-influenced sound.

== Commercial performance ==
"Crash and Burn" debuted at number 38 on the Billboard Country Airplay chart for the week ending April 25, 2015. It sold 40,000 copies in the US in its debut week. The song peaked at No. 2 on the Hot Country Songs, and No. 36 on the Hot 100 for charts dated September 5, 2015. The song reached No. 1 on the Country Airplay three weeks later, his fourth number-one on this chart and the fastest to reach the top spot. The song was certified platinum by the RIAA on September 23, 2015 and double-platinum in 2019. As of January 2016, the song has sold 882,000 copies in the US.

== Music video ==
Premiering in June 2015, the music video was directed by TK McKamy and features Rhett, who is dumped by a woman on the John Seigenthaler Pedestrian Bridge in downtown Nashville. Throughout the video, he pursues her and attempts to win her back, which fails after she walks off and leaves him in the middle of the street. Rhett explained that the video was shot on his "old stomping grounds from college," which he considered cool.

== Charts and certifications ==
=== Weekly charts ===
Chart (2015)	Peak position
Canada (Canadian Hot 100)	47
Canada Country (Billboard)	1
US Billboard Hot 100	36
US Country Airplay (Billboard)	1
US Hot Country Songs (Billboard)	2

=== Year-end charts ===
Chart (2015)	Position
US Country Airplay (Billboard)	21
US Hot Country Songs (Billboard)	5

=== Certifications ===
Region	Certification	Certified units/sales
United States (RIAA)	2× Platinum	2,000,000^{‡}
^{‡} Sales+streaming figures based on certification alone.
