= Ring on Every Finger =

Single by LoCash

from the album The Fighters
- Released: November 7, 2016
- Genre: Country, pop rock
- Length: 3:34
- Label: Reviver
- Songwriter(s): Jesse Frasure; Josh Kear; Thomas Rhett
- Producer(s): Lindsay Rimes

LoCash singles chronology
"I Know Somebody" (2016)	"Ring on Every Finger" (2016)	"Don't Get Better Than That" (2018)

"Ring on Every Finger" is a song recorded by American country music duo LoCash. It was released to radio on November 7, 2016 as the third single from The Fighters. The song was written by Jesse Frasure, Josh Kear and Thomas Rhett.

== Content ==
The song is an ode to the narrator's lover, using "over-the-top, almost saccharine overtures to prove they’re worthy of this girl’s hand in marriage". Thomas Rhett wrote the song with the intention of including it on his 2015 album Tangled Up, but it did not make the cut. When Rhett wrote it, he originally conceived the song as having a Latin music sound, but LoCash and producer Lindsay Rimes changed it to a more mainstream country-pop arrangement.

== Critical reception ==
Billy Dukes of Taste of Country called the song "an infectious, melodic jam" and stated that "Lyrically the songwriters snap short, dynamic phrases into place like puzzle pieces."

== Music video ==
The duo released the song's music video in January 2017.

== Chart performance ==
=== Weekly charts ===
Chart (2016–2017)	Peak position
Canada Country (Billboard)	35
US Bubbling Under Hot 100 (Billboard)	12
US Country Airplay (Billboard)	16
US Hot Country Songs (Billboard)	22

=== Year-end charts ===
Chart (2017)	Position
US Country Airplay (Billboard)	54
US Hot Country Songs (Billboard)	57
