= Hayley Jensen =

Australian singer and songwriter (born 1983)

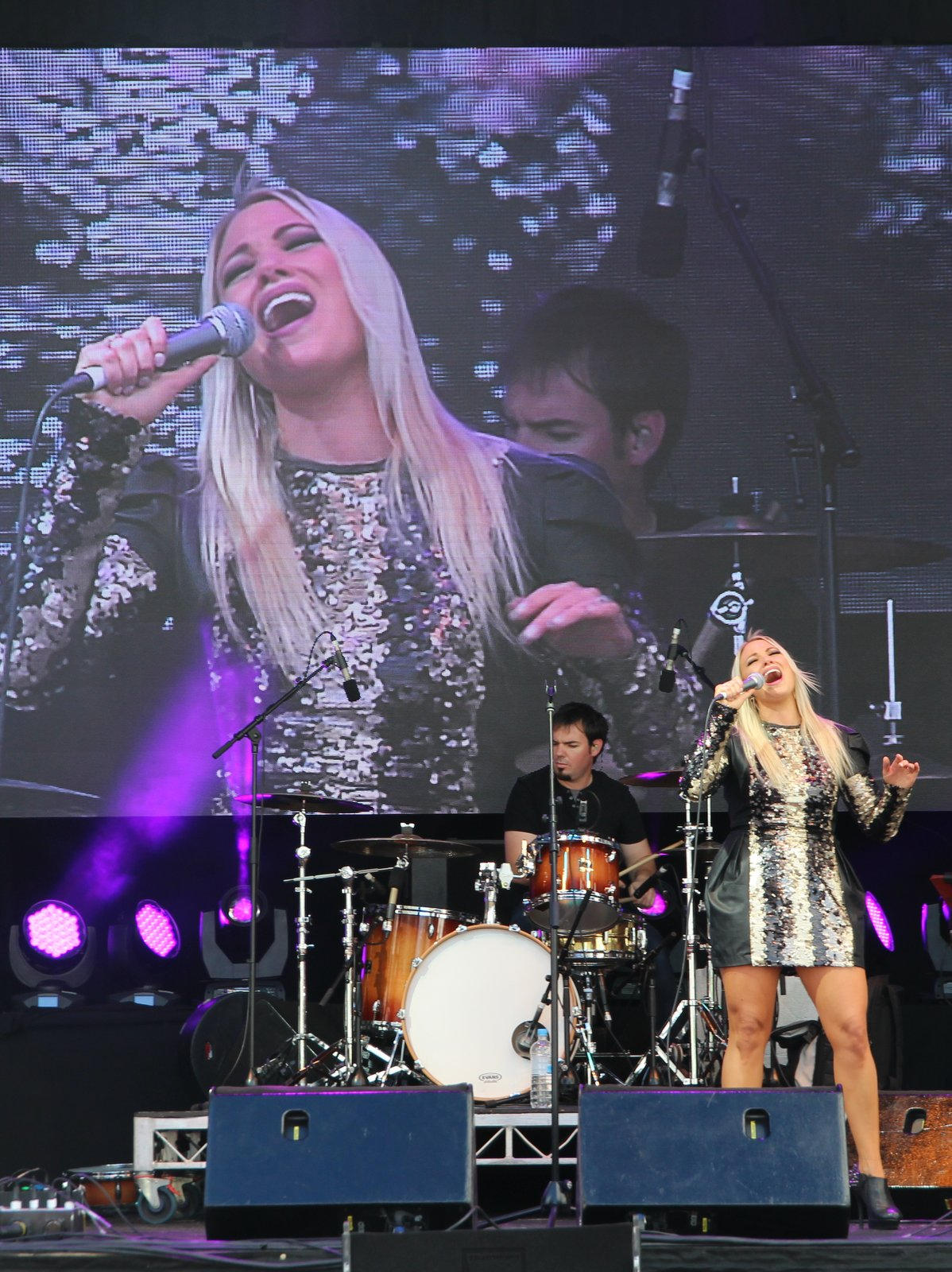
- Hayley Jensen performing at the Broadbeach Country Music Festival 2017

Background information
- Born: Hayley Jane; 7 January 1983 (age 43); Albury, New South Wales, Australia
- Origin: Canberra, Australian Capital Territory, Australia
- Genres: Country, alternative rock, pop rock, pop, roots music, folk rock, dance-rock
- Occupation: Singer-songwriter
- Instruments: Vocals, piano, keyboards
- Years active: 2004–present
- Website: www.hayleyjensen.net

Hayley Jensen (born 7 January 1983) is an Australian singer and songwriter who became known after placing fourth on the second series (2004) of Australian Idol.

In 2018 Jensen released the album Turning Up the Dial which became her first to enter the ARIA top 100. Jensen's fourth Breakin' Hearts (2021) and Country Soul (2025) continued that success.

== Early life ==
Hayley Jensen was born in Albury, New South Wales, but has lived in Canberra for most of her life. Before entering the Australian Idol competition, she studied Jazz vocals at the ANU whilst completing year 11–12, and then went on to study Economics and Management at the University of Canberra.

=== 2004: Early career and Australian Idol ===
In 2004, Jensen auditioned for Australian Idol. She did not progress from her hometown of Canberra, but travelled to Sydney to try again and was successful.She was selected for a spot in the Final 12 and continued in the competition for a number of weeks, eventually placing 4th.

Australian Idol performances and results (2004)
Episode	Song	Result
Audition		Through to the Theatre Rounds
Theatre Rounds	"Anyone Who Had a Heart"	Through to top 30
Top 30	"Angel"	Through to live shows
Live show 1: Australian Made (Top 12)	"Weir"	Saved by Public
Live show 2: Pop (Top 11)	"Left Outside Alone"	Saved by Public
Live show 3: The '60s (Top 10)	"To Sir, With Love"	Saved by Public
Live show 4: Disco (Top 9)	"If I Can't Have You"	Saved by Public
Live show 5: Contestants' Choice (Top 8)	"Release" (George song)	Saved by Public
Live show 6: Beatles (Top 7)	"Yesterday"	Saved by Public
Live show 7: The '80s (Top 6)	"I Feel the Earth Move"	Saved by Public
Live show 8: RnB-Soul (Top 5)	"Ain't No Mountain High Enough"	Saved by Public
Live show 9: (Top 4)	"It Had to Be You" / "Nature Boy"	Eliminated in 4th position

=== 2005-2013: Post-Idol activities ===
After Australian Idol, Jensen formed her own record label (White Dove Music), released a solo album, Note to Self and released a number of singles. She performed for Coalition Forces in Iraq, for the Prime Minister on a number of occasions, and at entertainment centres around Australia.

In March 2010, Jensen co-founded alternative pop/rock band Seasons with drummer Peter Wright and guitarist Sam Young. The band released their debut EP A Moment of Clarity on 15 April 2011. In late 2012, Seasons changed their name to Silver Cities, and released their first single, "Lights" was co-credited to Jensen. They toured as a supporting act for Evermore on their Hero National Tour. In November 2013, Hayley and her band received an award for their single "Lights" at the 2013 Australian Independent Music Awards.

=== 2014-2015: The Voice Australia ===
In 2014, Jensen auditioned for the third season of the Australian version of The Voice. She performed the song "Freefallin" in her audition chose to join Kylie Minogue's team. She was eliminated in the Battle Rounds.

The Voice performances and results (2014)
Episode	Song	Original Artist	Result
Audition	"Freefallin"	Zoë Badwi	Through to Battle rounds
Battle Rounds	"Roar"	Katy Perry	Eliminated

In 2015, Jensen joined Casey Donovan, Doug Williams and Darren Mapes, in a concert celebrating the songs and life of Burt Bacharach. In December 2015, Jensen was announced as a finalist in the 2016 Star Maker award.

=== 2016-present: Return to country music ===
In January 2016 Jensen released the country single "The One". She subsequently released the single "I'll Always Love You" and "Young Years" which was followed by the album Past Tense & Present Peace.

In 2017, Jensen signed with Social Family Records and in November 2017, released the single "Summertime Soundtrack".

In May 2018, her third studio album Turning Up the Dial was released. Jensen toured the album across the south east coast of Australia before heading to Manchester to perform as a headline international act at Buckle & Boots Country Music Festival and to Canada in 2019 to perform at Calgary Stampede.

Early 2020 Jensen released a version of Sarah McLachlan's "Angel", the song which got her to the top 12 in Australian Idol, this time as a duet with Australian Country Artist Beccy Cole.

With most of her shows and touring cancelled in 2020 due to COVID-19, Jensen wrote and produced music with Canadian producer Troy Kokol at Reluctant Cowboy Records. The first new single "Breakin' Hearts" was released in August 2020 as a radio single both in Australia and Canada and made it to number 2 in the Music Networks' Country Hot 50 chart.

In October 2021, Jensen released her fourth studio album, Breakin' Hearts.

Throughout 2024 and 2025, Jensen released singles "Stomping Ground", "Outskirts", "Dirt Rich" and "Giddy Up Cowboy". At the 2025 Independent Country Music Awards, Jensen won Best Song and Best Video.

In August 2025, Jensen released her fifth studio album Country Soul which peaked at number 14 on the ARIA Charts.

== Discography ==
=== Albums ===
Title	Details	Peak chart positions
Title	Details	AUS
Note to Self	Released: 16 September 2007; Label: White Dove Music (DOVE001CD); Format: CD, digital download	—
Past Tense & Present Peace	Released: 3 February 2017; Label: White Dove Music (DOVE005); Format: CD, digital download	—
Turning Up the Dial	Released: 11 May 2018; Label: Social Family (SFR0063); Format: CD, digital download	52
Breakin' Hearts	Released: 22 October 2021; Label: Social Family (SFR0128); Format: CD, LP, digital download, streaming	25
Country Soul	Released: 29 August 2025; Label: White Dove Music (DOVE007); Format: CD, LP, digital download, streaming	14

=== Singles ===
Title	Year	Peak chart positions	Album
Title	Year	AUS	Album
"Alive"	2006	68	Note to Self
"Stronger"	2007	—	Note to Self
"Waste Away"	2008	—	Note to Self
"Lights" (with Silver Cities)	2012	—	Lights (Silver Cities album)
"What You Waiting For?" (with Silver Cities)	2013	—	Lights (Silver Cities album)
"The One"	2016	—	Past Tense & Present Peace
"I'll Always Love You"	2016	—	Past Tense & Present Peace
"Young Years"	2016	—	Past Tense & Present Peace
"Summertime Soundtrack"	2017	—	Turning Up the Dial
"Saturday Night"	2018	—	Turning Up the Dial
"Forever Won't Be Long Enough"	2018	—	Turning Up the Dial
"This Love"	2018	—	Turning Up the Dial
"Next Big Thing"	2019	—	Turning Up the Dial
"Turning Up the Dial"	2019	—	Turning Up the Dial
"Angel" (featuring Beccy Cole)	2020	—	Breakin' Hearts
"Breakin' Hearts"	2020	—	Breakin' Hearts
"Fireworks"	2020	—	Breakin' Hearts
"Just Gonna Party"	2021	—	Breakin' Hearts
"Karma"	2021	—	Breakin' Hearts
"Really Shouldn't Drink Around You" (with Dan Davidson)	2021	—	6 Songs to Midnight
"Better Than That"	2022	—	Breakin' Hearts
"Flirtin'" (with Petric)	2022	—	Non-album single
"Shake My Bones"	2022	—	Breakin' Hearts
"Four Boots" (featuring Clayton Bellamy)	2022	—	Breakin' Hearts
"Bring It On"	2023	—	Country Soul
"Rock Bottom"	2023	—	Country Soul
"Welcome Back Summer"	2023	—	Non-album single
"Stomping Ground"	2024	—	Country Soul
"Outskirts"	2024	—	Country Soul
"Dirt Rich"	2025	—	Country Soul
"Giddy Up Cowboy"	2025	—	Country Soul
"Country Soul"	2025	—	Country Soul
"Burn It Down"	2026	—	
"Wild as the Wind"	2026	—	
"Everything All Works Out"	2026	—	

== Awards and nominations ==
=== AIR Awards ===
The Australian Independent Record Awards (commonly known informally as AIR Awards) is an annual awards night to recognise, promote and celebrate the success of Australia's Independent Music sector.

Year	Nominee / work	Award	Result	Ref.
2026	Country Soul	Best Independent Country Album or EP	Nominated	

=== Country Music Awards of Australia ===
The Country Music Awards of Australia is an annual awards night held in January during the Tamworth Country Music Festival. Celebrating recording excellence in the Australian country music industry. They commenced in 1973.

Year	Nominee / work	Award	Result	Ref.
2016	Hayley Jensen	Star Maker Award	Finalist	
2022	Hayley Jensen	Female Artist of the Year	Nominated	
2023	Hayley Jensen	Female Artist of the Year	Nominated	
2026	Country Soul	Contemporary Country Album of the Year	Nominated	
2026	Country Soul	Album of the Year	Nominated	

=== Music for a New Generation Awards by Planet Country with Big Stu & MJ ===
The Music for a New Generation Awards was a country music aware program as part of Planet Country with Big Stu & MJ radio show. They ran from 2015 to 2018..

Year	Nominee / work	Award	Result	Ref.
2018	Hayley Jensen	Australian Female Artist of The Year	Won	
