= Spark (Drake White album) =

Studio album by Drake White
- Released: August 19, 2016
- Genre: Country
- Length: 42:19
- Label: Dot
- Producer: Ross Copperman; Andrew Petroff; Adam Schwind; Jeremy Stover; Drake White

Drake White chronology
It Feels Good (2015)	Spark (2016)

Singles from Spark
- 1. "It Feels Good" Released: February 24, 2015; 2. "Livin' the Dream" Released: December 7, 2015; 3. "Makin' Me Look Good Again" Released: December 5, 2016

Spark is the debut studio album of American country music singer Drake White. It was released on August 19, 2016 via Dot Records, an imprint of Big Machine Records. The album has produced three singles, "It Feels Good", Livin' the Dream" and "Makin' Me Look Good Again", all of which have reached the Top 40 on the Billboard Country Airplay chart. White co-wrote eleven of the album's twelve tracks.

Ross Copperman and Jeremy Stover produced all tracks except for track 10, with assistance from White on tracks 3, 6, 7, and 8. Andrew Petroff and Adam Schwind produced track 10.

== Commercial reception ==
The album debuted at No. 34 on Billboard 200, and No. 4 on the Top Country Albums chart, selling 11,000 copies in its first week. It has sold 58,900 copies in the US as of September 2017.

== Track listing ==
No.	Title	Writer(s)	Length
1.	"Heartbeat"	Drake White; Ross Copperman; Jason Sellers	3:27
2.	"Story"	White; Mark Irwin; Tommy Lee James	3:14
3.	"Makin' Me Look Good Again"	White; Monty Criswell; Shane Minor	3:59
4.	"It Feels Good"	White; Derek George; Philip Pence	2:40
5.	"Livin' the Dream"	Tom Douglas; Jaren Johnston; Luke Laird	3:09
6.	"I Need Real"	White; Copperman; Jon Nite	3:41
7.	"Back to Free"	White; Randy Montana; Pence	3:59
8.	"Equator"	White; Matt Jenkins; Trevor Rosen	4:07
9.	"Live Some"	Copperman; Shane McAnally; Josh Osborne; White	3:38
10.	"Waitin' on the Whiskey to Work"	White; Tony Lane; Pence	4:01
11.	"Elvis"	White; Jeremy Spillman; Ryan Tyndell	3:07
12.	"Take Me as I Am"	White; Phil Barton; Lindsay Rimes	3:17
Total length:			42:19

== Personnel ==
Musicians

- Jon Aanestad – harmonica
- Joe Andrews – electric guitar
- Paul Armstrong – trumpet
- Zac Brown – background vocals
- Clay Cook – background vocals
- Ross Copperman – acoustic guitar, electric guitar, keyboards, background vocals
- Sam Damewood – fiddle
- Jimmy de Martini – background vocals
- Kris Donegan – electric guitar
- Fred Eltringham – drums
- Shannon Forrest – drums
- Mark Hill – bass guitar
- John Driskell Hopkins – background vocals
- Carolyn Dawn Johnson – background vocals
- Jaren Johnston – background vocals
- Jason Lehning – keyboards
- Tony Lucido – bass guitar
- Matt McDaniel – banjo, acoustic guitar, electric guitar, keyboards, electric sitar
- Miles McPherson – drums
- Jimmy Nichols – keyboards
- Billy Nobel – keyboards
- Phillip Pence – bass guitar, acoustic guitar, ukulele
- Andrew Petroff – percussion
- Ethan Pilzer – bass guitar
- Danny Rader – banjo, acoustic guitar, electric guitar, mandolin
- Mike Rojas – keyboards
- Adam Schwind – drums, percussion, background vocals
- Carlos Sosa – saxophone
- Dawn Soul – tambourine
- Russell Terrell – background vocals
- Ilya Toshinsky – acoustic guitar, electric guitar
- Raúl Vallejo – trombone
- Derek Wells – acoustic guitar, electric guitar
- Drake White – lead vocals

Production

- Natthaphol Abhigantaphand – production assistant
- Daniel Bacigalupi – production assistant
- Joe Baldridge – engineer
- Adam Bokesch – production assistant
- Drew Bollman – production assistant
- Ross Copperman – digital editing, engineer, producer, programming
- Paul Cossette – production assistant
- Andrew Darby – production assistant
- Brian David – digital editing
- Steve Dewey – production assistant
- Angella Grossi – production assistant
- Bob Holland – engineer mixing
- Travis Humbert – production assistant
- Scott Johnson – production coordination
- Allison Jones – A&R
- Laurel Kittleson – production coordination
- Jason Kyle – engineer
- Nick Lane – engineer
- Jasper Lemaster – production assistant, engineer
- Andrew Mendelson – mastering
- Buckley Miller – engineer, mixing
- Justin Niebank – mixing
- Andrew Petroff – engineer, producer
- Richard Ridgell – production assistant
- Lindsay Rimes – programming
- Adam Schwind – producer
- Reid Shippen – engineer, mixing
- Brianna Steinitz – production coordination
- Jeremy Stover – producer
- Drake White – producer
- Chris Wilkinson – production assistant

== Chart performance ==
=== Album ===
==== Weekly charts ====
Chart (2016)	Peak position
US Billboard 200	34
US Top Country Albums (Billboard)	4
US Digital Albums (Billboard)	8

==== Year-end charts ====
Chart (2016)	Position
US Top Country Albums (Billboard)	71
