= Country Music Star No. 1 =

Compilation album by Glen Campbell
- Released: 1969
- Recorded: 1960–1961
- Genre: Country
- Label: Starday

Professional ratings
Review scores
Source	Rating
Allmusic	2/5 stars

Country Music Star No. 1 contains recordings of a pre-stardom Glen Campbell, which were made around 1960–1961. This album, just like the other Starday album Country Soul, was released after Campbell rose to international fame with hits including "Gentle on My Mind", "By the Time I Get to Phoenix" and "Wichita Lineman". Campbell sued against these releases but eventually settled with Starday.

== Track listing ==
Side 1:

1. "Gone But Not Forgotten" (Horton/Bryan) – 2:38
2. "The Ashes Of Time" (Horton/Bryan) – 2:00
3. "Groovin Country" (Horton/Bryan) – 1:45
4. "No Need Of Lying" (Horton/Bryan) – 2:22
5. "Talking To Myself" (Horton/Bryan) – 2:22

Side 2:

1. "I'm A Fool For You" (Horton/Bryan) – 2:15
2. "Why Did You Do Me This Way" (Horton/Bryan) – 2:24
3. "I Need You Dear I Do" (Horton/Bryan) – 1:40
4. "The Judge And Jury" (Horton/Bryan) – 2:34
5. "One Of These Days" (Horton/Bryan) – 2:26

== Personnel ==
- Glen Campbell – vocals, acoustic guitar

== Production ==
- Cover design – Dan Quest Art Studio
