= Country Soul (Glen Campbell album) =

Compilation album by Glen Campbell
- Released: 1968
- Recorded: 1960/1961
- Genre: Country
- Label: Starday
- Producer: Don Pierce

Country Soul contains recordings of a pre-stardom Glen Campbell, which were made around 1960-1961. This album, just like the other Starday album Country Music Star No. 1, was released after Glen Campbell rose to international fame with hits like "Gentle on My Mind," "By the Time I Get to Phoenix" and "Wichita Lineman." Campbell sued against these releases but eventually settled with Starday.

== Track listing ==
Side 1:

1. "Why Try To Lie" (Horton/Morgan/Bryan) - 2:13
2. "Smokey Blue Eyes" (Horton/Morgan/Bryan/Kirkland) - 2:57
3. "I'll Always Be Waiting" (Horton/Morgan/Bryan) - 2:25
4. "The Love Of A Woman" (Horton/Morgan/Bryan) - 2:28
5. "Another Face, Another Place" (Horton/Morgan/Bryan) - 1:47

Side 2:

1. "Where Do I Go From Here" (Horton/Morgan/Bryan) - 3:41
2. "Remind Me Of You" (Horton/Morgan/Bryan) - 3:49
3. "Three's A Crowd" (Horton/Morgan/Bryan) - 2:07
4. "My Whole Life Through" (Horton/Morgan/Campbell) - 2:17
5. "Something To Remember" (Horton/Morgan/Bryan) - 2:19

== Personnel ==
- Glen Campbell - vocals, acoustic guitar

== Production ==
- Producer - Don Pierce
- Music produced by Thomas R. Morgan
- Arrangements - Mark Roberts
- Cover design - Dan Quest Art Studio
