= Livin' the Dream (Drake White song) =

Single by Drake White

from the album Spark
- Released: December 7, 2015
- Genre: Country
- Length: 3:07
- Label: Dot
- Songwriter(s): Tom Douglas; Jaren Johnston; Luke Laird
- Producer(s): Ross Copperman; Jeremy Stover

Drake White singles chronology
"It Feels Good" (2015)	"Livin' the Dream" (2015)	"Makin' Me Look Good Again" (2016)

"Livin' the Dream" is a song written by Tom Douglas, Jaren Johnston and Luke Laird and recorded by American country music artist Drake White. It was released to radio on December 7, 2015 as the second single to his debut studio album, Spark, which was released on August 19, 2016.

== Content ==
The song is about a "lower middle class couple" who are struggling but "focusing on the emotional salve of the healthy, adoring relationship". White told Billboard that "This song does have a realistic point to it that there are bad things going on out there, but at the end of the day, it’s that tough stuff that makes the good stuff good."

The song's arrangement relies mainly on nylon-string guitar playing "a mix of major chords and seventh chords that creates a descending melodic pattern pocked with dissonance and release."

== Critical reception ==
Taste of Country reviewed the song favorably, praising the soulfulness of White's delivery, comparing his vocals favorably to James Otto.

== Charts ==
=== Weekly charts ===
Chart (2015–2016)	Peak position
US Bubbling Under Hot 100 (Billboard)	4
US Country Airplay (Billboard)	12
US Hot Country Songs (Billboard)	20

=== Year end charts ===
Chart (2016)	Position
US Country Airplay (Billboard)	48
US Hot Country Songs (Billboard)	65
