= Brothers (LoCash album) =

Studio album by LoCash
- Released: March 29, 2019
- Genre: Country
- Length: 33:27
- Label: Wheelhouse
- Producers: Corey Crowder; Tyler Hubbard; Lindsay Rimes; Jordan Schmidt

LoCash chronology
| The Fighters (2016) | Brothers (2019) | Woods & Water (2021) |

Singles from Brothers
- 1. "Feels Like a Party" Released: September 4, 2018; 2. "One Big Country Song" Released: May 13, 2019; 3. "Beers to Catch Up On" Released: August 31, 2020

Brothers is the fourth studio album by the American country music duo LoCash. It was released on March 29, 2019 via Wheelhouse Records, a division of Broken Bow Records. The album includes the singles "Feels Like a Party" and "One Big Country Song."

== Content ==
Preston Brust and Chris Lucas, who comprise LoCash, announced the album in February 2019. The lead single, "Feels Like a Party", was sent to radio in late 2018. The duo said that the album reflects their dependence on each other throughout their careers, with Sounds Like Nashville writer Lauren Laffer saying that it "will consist of upbeat feel-good songs and have an overall neighborly sentiment." Brust and Lucas wrote some of the songs on the album, with other writers including Russell Dickerson, Rhett Akins, and Devin Dawson's twin brother Jacob Durrett. Tyler Hubbard, one-half of Florida Georgia Line, produced the album with Lindsay Rimes, Corey Crowder, and Jordan Schmidt.

== Commercial performance ==
The album debuted at No. 34 on Billboard's Top Country Albums, selling 3,800 copies in the first week.

== Track listing ==
| No. | Title | Writer(s) | Length |
|---|---|---|---|
| 1. | "One Big Country Song" | Jesse Frasure; Ashley Gorley; Michael Hardy | 3:12 |
| 2. | "How Much Time You Got" | Jacob Durrett; Corey Crowder; Rhett Akins | 3:02 |
| 3. | "Brothers" | Preston Brust; Chris Lucas; Crowder; Tyler Hubbard | 2:55 |
| 4. | "Summer in a Truck" | Akins; Ben Hayslip; Zach Crowell | 3:08 |
| 5. | "God Thing" | Jordan Schmidt; Alex Smith; Hubbard; Russell Dickerson | 2:55 |
| 6. | "It's Only Midnight" | Marv Green; Akins; Dallas Davidson | 2:55 |
| 7. | "Feels Like a Party" | Brust; Lucas; Hubbard; Crowder | 2:48 |
| 8. | "Secret Weapon" | Brust; Lucas; Schmidt; Crowder | 2:48 |
| 9. | "Cold Beer Kinda Night" | Chris DeStefano; Gorley; Akins | 3:22 |
| 10. | "Kissing a Girl" | Matthew West; Andrew Pruis; Thomas Finchum | 3:24 |
| 11. | "Beers to Catch Up On" | Akins; Jeremy Stover; Paul DiGiovanni | 2:58 |
| Total length: | | | 33:27 |

== Charts ==
| Chart (2019) | Peak position |
|---|---|
| Australian Digital Albums (ARIA) | 12 |
| US Top Country Albums (Billboard) | 34 |
