= Soul Circus Cowboys =

Soul Circus Cowboys is an American Southern rock group based in Tampa, Florida. The band was founded by lead singer and songwriter Billy McKnight in 2009. They are currently produced by Grammy-award-winning songwriter Frank Myers.

== History ==
Soul Circus Cowboys founder Billy McKnight grew up in Brandon, Florida. McKnight moved to Nashville in 1994 and spent ten years learning the music industry before returning to Florida. It was there that McKnight came across Frank Myers, a successful songwriter and artist. McKnight was suggested to Myers as a partner on a song of Myers, "High and Low." Myers began collaborating with the band and to this day produces their albums. After moving back to Florida, McKnight began auditioning members for Soul Circus Cowboys. He named the band Soul Circus Cowboys based on the band's life experiences, which he compared to a roller coaster ride. The cowboy and soul elements come from their musical style.

Their first album was released in 2011, titled Lay it Down. The lead single, "Lay it Down", and accompanying music video was picked up by national cable networks Great American Country and Country Music Television. Their subsequent albums, Tailgate Country, I Can't Imagine, and Rolling Across America have also received recognition. Their 2016 album Tailgate Country reached 25 on the Top Billboard Country Album Charts. 2020 single "I Stand" was also picked up by Great American Country and Country Music Television. In 2021, the band wrote "We're Going to Buc You Up," a fight song for the Tampa Bay Buccaneers football team in advance of their 2021 Super Bowl win.

The band plays over 50 festivals and local shows every year and have performed at the Jeep Jam in Ohio, as well as every state between the Keys. They have also performed with Big & Rich and other country and southern rock acts.

== Discography ==
Soul Circus Cowboys Releases
Title	Details
Lay It Down	Released: 2012
Tailgate Country	Released: 2016
I Can't Imagine	Released: April 1, 2019
Gotta Get Me One of Them: Single	Released: April 22, 2015
Rolling Across America: First Leg	Released: April 2, 2021
Rolling Across America: Home Stretch	Released: 2022
Setting You Free: Single	Released: March 11, 2022
Last Train Running: Single	Released: March 31, 2023
Boys Like Us: Single	Released: June 16, 2023
Country Girls: Single	Released: August 25, 2023
Time: Single	Released: October 6, 2023
Knowing That Girl: Single	Released: November 21, 2023
Sundown: Single Cover	Released: February 16, 2024
Sit on a Beach: Single	Released: April 19, 2024
