= Found (song) =

Single by Dan Davidson

from the album Songs for Georgia
- Released: March 7, 2016
- Recorded: December 2015 (Nashville, Tennessee)
- Genre: Country
- Length: 3:14
- Label: Independent (via Sharp 9 Music)
- Songwriters: Dan Davidson; Clayton Bellamy
- Producer: Jeff Dalziel

Dan Davidson singles chronology
"Unkiss Her" (2015)	"Found" (2016)	"Barn Burner" (2016)

Music video
- "Found" on YouTube

"Found" is a song recorded by Canadian country singer and songwriter Dan Davidson for his debut solo extended play, Songs for Georgia (2017). Davidson co-wrote the song with fellow musician Clayton Bellamy, while Jeff Dalziel produced the track. It was released independently on March 7, 2016 as Davidson's second solo single. "Found" was a radio hit, reaching number 16 on the Canada Country chart, making it the highest-charting independent single on Canadian country radio.

== Content ==
"Found" is an up-tempo country song with elements of bluegrass, including a fiddle solo. It was written by Dan Davidson and Clayton Bellamy over a couple of days in December 2015 at Bellamy's Nashville, Tennessee home. Davidson refers to the song as "fun, drunken proposal song;" in the chorus, he asks a love interest, "Would you marry me in the back forty?" while assuring her that they "could have that beautiful life."

== Commercial performance ==
"Found" debuted at number 48 on the Billboard Canada Country chart dated May 7, 2016. It was the 2nd most added song at Canadian country radio, according to Mediabase, and tied for 8th most added at all formats for the week of June 14, 2016. On the next published chart, dated June 25, 2016, "Found" reached the top 30 of the Billboard chart. In doing so, it became the #1 independently-released and distributed country single in Canada. It reached a peak position of 16 on the chart dated July 16, 2016. "Found" was the best-selling Canadian country single for multiple weeks in July and August 2016, according to figures reported by Nielsen Soundscan. The song was certified Gold by Music Canada in August 2017, and later reached Platinum status in September 2022.

== Music video ==
The music video for "Found" was directed by Travis Nesbitt and filmed in Davidon's hometown of Edmonton, Alberta on a budget of $500. Described by Davidson as "sort of a hilarious experiment," the video features Davidson and his bandmates dressed in animal mascot costumes and dancing around a barn. It premiered on Davidson's official YouTube channel on May 9, 2016.

== Charts ==
Chart (2016)	Peak position
Canada Country (Billboard)	16

== Certifications ==
Region	Certification	Certified units/sales
Canada (Music Canada)	Platinum	80,000^{‡}
^{‡} Sales+streaming figures based on certification alone.

== Release history ==
Country	Date	Format	Label	Ref.
Canada	May 7, 2016	Digital download	Independent (via Sharp 9 Music)	
United States	May 7, 2016	Digital download	Independent (via Sharp 9 Music)	
United States	May 25, 2016	Country radio	Independent (via Sharp 9 Music)	
