= Frank Foster (country singer) =

American country music singer-songwriter

- Born: January 22, 1982 (age 44); Cypress Bottom, Claiborne Parish, Louisiana, United States
- Genres: Country
- Occupation: Singer-songwriter
- Instruments: Vocals; guitar
- Years active: 2011–present
- Labels: Lone Chief
- Website: www.frankfostermusic.com

Frank Foster (born January 22, 1982, in Cypress Bottom, Claiborne Parish, Louisiana, United States) is an American country music singer-songwriter. Foster has released eleven independent albums: Rowdy Reputation in 2011, Red Wings and Six Strings in 2012, Southern Soul in 2013, Rhythm and Whiskey in 2014, Boots on the Ground in 2016, Good Country Music in 2016, Till I'm Gone in 2018, The Way It Was in 2020, Star Spangled Bangers in 2021, Ridin' For the Brand in 2023, and Tuffer Than the Rest in 2023.

Jonathan Widran of AllMusic gave Red Wings and Six Strings four stars out of five, writing that "Foster's ability to connect lies in the raw emotional authenticity of his storytelling". Southern Soul sold 6,000 copies in its first week of release, debuting at number 11 on the Billboard Top Country Albums chart and number 67 on the Billboard 200. Rhythm and Whiskey debuted at number 21 on the Billboard 200 and number four on the Hot Country Albums chart, with 9,000 copies sold in the US the first week.

== Discography ==
=== Albums ===
Title	Album details	Peak chart positions				Sales
Title	Album details	US Country	US	US Heat	US Indie	Sales
Rowdy Reputation	Release date: March 10, 2011; Label: Frank Foster	—	—	—	—	
Red Wings and Six Strings	Release date: September 4, 2012; Label: Frank Foster	30	—	7	38	
Southern Soul	Release date: September 3, 2013; Label: Frank Foster	11	67	—	11	
Rhythm and Whiskey	Release date: September 2, 2014; Label: Lone Chief Records	4	21	—	3	US: 10,300
Boots on the Ground	Release date: January 15, 2016; Label: Lone Chief Records	7	86	—	5	US: 7,600
Good Country Music	Release date: October 28, 2016; Label: Lone Chief Records	13	113	—	7	US: 5,900
'Til I'm Gone	Release date: September 21, 2018; Label: Lone Chief Records	16	160	—	4	US: 6,300
"—" denotes releases that did not chart

=== Singles ===
Year	Single	Album
2014	"Outlaw Angel"	Rhythm and Whiskey
2014	"Southern Man"	Rhythm and Whiskey

=== Music videos ===
Year	Video	Director
2012	"Blue Collar Boys"	Brett Bortle
2012	"Amen"	Brett Bortle
2013	"Backwoods Babydoll"	Brett Bortle
2014	"Cut Off Jeans"	Brett Bortle
2014	"Southern Man"	Brett Bortle
2014	"Bayou Moon"	Brett Bortle
2014	"Flyin' Down The Highway"	Brett Bortle
2015	"Boots on the Ground"	Brett Bortle
2016	"Tuff"	Brett Bortle
2018	"Something Bout Being Free"	Brett Bortle
2018	"#3 Sticker"	Brett Bortle
