= Drake White =

American country music singer (born 1983)

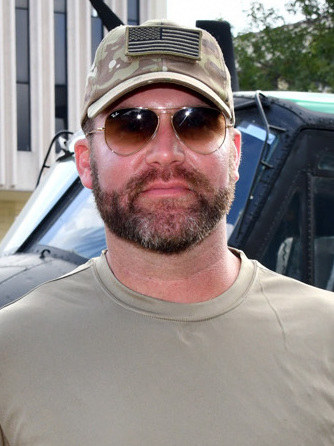
- White in 2022

Background information
- Born: William Drake White; October 3, 1983 (age 42); Hokes Bluff, Alabama
- Origin: Hokes Bluff, Alabama
- Genres: Country
- Occupation: Singer-songwriter
- Instruments: Vocals, guitar
- Years active: 2011-present
- Labels: MCA Nashville, Dot, BMLG

William Drake White (born October 3, 1983) is an American country music singer and the leader of Drake White & The Big Fire.

== Early life ==
White was born in Hokes Bluff, Alabama, where he attended Hokes Bluff High School. White started writing his thoughts down when he was 14, some of which would later become lyrics in his songs. He started singing when he was asked to join the youth choir at First Baptist Church of Hokes Bluff by his parents. He later attended Gadsden State Community College and then Auburn University, graduating with a degree in building science. Later, he worked with a general contractor in Nashville, Tennessee before quitting that job in favor of a musical career.

== Music career ==
In concert, he and his band ("Drake White & The Big Fire") opened up performances for such musicians as Eric Church, Luke Bryan, Lynyrd Skynyrd, Tyler Bryant, and Channing Wilson. White has opened for Little Big Town and the Zac Brown Band.

In early 2013, he released his debut single "Simple Life" through MCA Nashville. White signed to Big Machine Records' re-establishment of Dot Records in June 2014. The first single, "It Feels Good" released to country radio on February 24, 2015. The second single, "Livin' the Dream" released to country radio on December 7, 2015. On August 19, 2016, White released "Spark", his debut album under Dot Records. It charted at No. 4 on the Top Country Albums chart. The album's third single, "Makin' Me Look Good Again", was released in 2016. A new 5-song EP titled "Pieces" was released on May 4, 2018.

== Personal life ==
In January 2019, White was diagnosed with arteriovenous malformation (AVM), a rare vascular disorder.

== Discography ==
=== Studio albums ===
Title	Details	Peak chart positions		Sales
Title	Details	US Country	US	Sales
50 Years Too Late	Release date: February 18, 2011; Label: Self-released; Formats: CD, digital download	—	—	
Spark	Release date: August 19, 2016; Label: Dot Records; Formats: CD, digital download	4	34	US: 58,900
The Optimystic	Release date: March 11, 2022; Label: Reverend White; Formats: CD, digital download, streaming	—	—	
Low Country High Road	Release date: September 20, 2024; Label: Reverend White; Formats: CD, digital download, streaming	—	—	
"—" denotes releases that did not chart

=== Extended plays ===
Title	Details	Sales
It Feels Good	Release date: September 18, 2015; Label: Dot Records; Formats: Digital download	
Pieces	Release date: May 4, 2018; Label: BMLG; Formats: Digital download, streaming	US: 2,300
Drake White and the Big Fire Live	Release date: December 4, 2018; Label: Reverend White; Formats: Digital download, streaming	
Stars	Release date: April 17, 2020; Label: Reverend White; Formats: Digital download, streaming	
The Bridge	Release date: October 6, 2023; Label: Reverend White; Formats: Digital download, streaming	

=== Singles ===
Year	Single	Peak chart positions			Sales	Album
Year	Single	US Country	US Country Airplay	US Bubbling	Sales	Album
2013	"The Simple Life"	—	36	—		—N/a
2015	"It Feels Good"	38	33	—		Spark
2015	"Livin' the Dream"	20	12	4		Spark
2016	"Makin' Me Look Good Again"	32	26	—	US: 93,000	Spark
"—" denotes releases that did not chart

=== Music videos ===
Year	Video	Director
2015	"It Feels Good"	Roman White
2016	"Livin' the Dream"	P. R. Brown
2017	"Makin' Me Look Good Again"	Shaun Silva
