= LoCash Cowboys (album) =

Studio album by LoCash Cowboys
- Released: June 18, 2013
- Genre: Country
- Length: 39:05
- Label: Average Joes Entertainment
- Producer: Noah Gordon, Shannon Houchins, Jeffrey Steele

LoCash Cowboys chronology
LoCash Cowboys (2008)	LoCash Cowboys (2013)	I Love This Life (2015)

Singles from LoCash Cowboys
- 1. "Keep in Mind" Released: September 20, 2010; 2. "C.O.U.N.T.R.Y." Released: April 30, 2012; 3. "Chase a Little Love" Released: April 22, 2013; 4. "Best Seat in the House" Released: September 30, 2013

LoCash Cowboys is the self-titled second album of the American country music duo LoCash Cowboys. It was released on June 18, 2013 via Average Joes Entertainment.

== Critical reception ==
Giving it 4 stars out of 5, Matt Bjorke of Roughstock said that it "is the work of a band that has spent years honing their craft and while a thoroughly modern Country music album". It received a C+ rating from Joseph Hudak of Country Weekly, who said that "these guys believe the musical mayhem they're laying down" and thought that "Independent Trucker" was a highlight, but criticized the lyrics of "Hey Hey Hey" and "Fine".

== Track listing ==
1. "Hey Hey Hey" (Preston Brust, Chris Lucas, Jeffrey Steele) — 2:49
2. "Chase a Little Love" (Brust, Jaron Boyer) — 3:03
3. "Love Drunk" (Brust, Lucas, Skip Black) — 3:22
4. "Best Seat in the House" (Brust, Lucas, Aaron Barker) — 3:25
5. "Bounce" (Brust, Lucas, Chris Janson) — 2:28
6. "Make It Look Good" (Brust, Lucas) — 3:21
7. "Little Miss Crazyhot" (Brust, Lucas, Steve Dean, Wil Nance) — 2:40
8. "I Hope" (Brust, Lucas, Steele) — 3:41
9. "Fine" (Brust, Lucas, Steele) — 2:51
10. "Keep in Mind" (Steele, Shane Minor) —3:47
11. "Independent Trucker" (Steele, Chris Stapleton) — 3:45
  - featuring George Jones
12. "C.O.U.N.T.R.Y." (Brust, Lucas, Steele) — 3:53

== Personnel ==
- Larry Beaird - acoustic guitar
- Bruce Bouton - steel guitar
- Jim "Moose" Brown - keyboards
- Susan Brown - fiddle
- Steve Bryant - bass
- Pat Buchanan - electric guitar
- Nick Buda - drums, percussion
- Tom Bukovac - electric guitar
- J. T. Corenflos - electric guitar
- David Dorn - keyboards
- Howard Duck - steel drums
- Mike Durham - electric guitar
- Shannon Forrest - drums, percussion
- Larry Franklin - fiddle
- Noah Gordon - vocals
- Kevin Grantt - bass
- Rob Hajacos - fiddle
- Tommy Harden - drums, percussion
- Steve Hinson - steel guitar
- Mike Johnson - steel guitar
- George Jones - vocals
- Jeff King - electric guitar
- Steve Mackey - bass
- Russ Paul - steel guitar
- Steven Sheehan - acoustic guitar
- Jeffrey Steele - vocals
- David White - electric guitar
- John Willis - acoustic guitar
- Reese Wynans - piano

== Chart performance ==
Chart (2013)	Peak position
US Billboard 200	97
US Top Country Albums (Billboard)	25
US Independent Albums (Billboard)	22
