= T-Shirt (Thomas Rhett song) =

Single by Thomas Rhett

from the album Tangled Up
- Released: February 16, 2016
- Recorded: 2013–15
- Genre: Country
- Length: 3:47
- Label: Valory
- Songwriters: Ashley Gorley; Luke Laird; Shane McAnally
- Producers: Dann Huff; Jesse Frasure

Thomas Rhett singles chronology
| "Die a Happy Man" (2015) | "T-Shirt" (2016) | "Vacation" (2016) |

"T-Shirt" is a song recorded by American country music singer Thomas Rhett. It was released on February 16, 2016 via Valory Music Group as the third single from his second studio album, Tangled Up (2015). The song was written by Ashley Gorley, Luke Laird, and Shane McAnally.

"T-Shirt" peaked at number one on the Billboard Country Airplay chart, giving Rhett his sixth consecutive number-one hit on that chart. It also charted at numbers 3 and 41 on both the Hot Country Songs and Hot 100 charts respectively. The song was certified three-times Platinum by the Recording Industry Association of America (RIAA), denoting sales of three million units in the United States. It also had chart success in Canada, giving Rhett his third number-one hit on the Country chart and reaching number 53 on the Canadian Hot 100.

== Background ==
Before the release of Tangled Up in 2015, Rhett had been performing the song live as early as November 2013. It was originally slated to be recorded by Tim McGraw, but it would later be passed to Rhett. On September 4, 2015, the track and a video of the song were made available for sales and as "instant grat" downloads for those who made a pre-release order of the album on iTunes.

== Reception ==
=== Critical ===
Website Taste of Country reviewed the song favorably, saying that "With "T-Shirt," Thomas Rhett again proves that nobody sings young love better than he does. Every single love song he’s released from his first two albums recalls a honeymooner’s excitement. The lascivious tension is palpable."

=== Commercial ===
The song first entered on the Hot Country Songs at number 39 when the track was made available for download on September 4, 2015, three weeks before the release of the album, selling 8,000 copies in its first week. It debuted on the Country Airplay chart at number 53 for chart dated February 13, 2016 when it was released as a single, and entered the Billboard Hot 100 at number 92 on chart date of March 19, 2016. The song peaked at number one on the Country Airplay chart, and number 3 on Hot Country Songs the same week. The song has sold 529,000 copies in the US as of August 2016.

== Music video ==
An Instant Grat Video for the song, directed by Blake Judd, premiered in September 2015.

== Charts and certifications ==
=== Weekly charts ===
| Chart (2016) | Peak position |
|---|---|
| Canada (Canadian Hot 100) | 53 |
| Canada Country (Billboard) | 1 |
| US Billboard Hot 100 | 41 |
| US Country Airplay (Billboard) | 1 |
| US Hot Country Songs (Billboard) | 3 |

=== Year end charts ===
| Chart (2016) | Position |
|---|---|
| US Country Airplay (Billboard) | 14 |
| US Hot Country Songs (Billboard) | 16 |

=== Certifications ===
| Region | Certification | Certified units/sales |
|---|---|---|
| Australia (ARIA) | Gold | 35,000^{‡} |
| United States (RIAA) | 3× Platinum | 3,000,000^{‡} |
^{‡} Sales+streaming figures based on certification alone.
