= The Fighters (LoCash album) =

Studio album by LoCash
- Released: June 17, 2016
- Genre: Country pop
- Label: Reviver
- Producer: Lindsay Rimes

LoCash chronology
I Love This Life (2015)	The Fighters (2016)	Brothers (2019)

Singles from The Fighters
- 1. "I Love This Life" Released: February 23, 2015; 2. "I Know Somebody" Released: February 22, 2016; 3. "Ring on Every Finger" Released: November 7, 2016

The Fighters is the third studio album by American country pop duo LoCash (formerly LoCash Cowboys). It was released on June 17, 2016 via Reviver Records. It includes the singles I Love This Life and I Know Somebody.

== Commercial performance ==
The album debuted at No. 131 on Billboard 200, No. 14 on Top Country Albums, selling 4,200 copies in the first week. The album has sold 20,600 copies in the United States as of October 2016.

== Track listing ==
No.	Title	Writer(s)	Length
1.	"I Love This Life"	Preston Brust, Chris Lucas, Chris Janson, Danny Myrick	3:29
2.	"Ring on Every Finger"	Jesse Frasure, Josh Kear, Thomas Rhett	3:32
3.	"I Know Somebody"	Ross Copperman, Jeremy Stover, Rhett Akins	3:18
4.	"Shipwrecked"	Brust, Michael Tyler, Lindsay Rimes	2:54
5.	"Moonwalkin"	Brust, Pete Good, Tyler	2:32
6.	"Drunk Drunk"	Brust, Lucas, Brian Niemi, Stevens Stokes	2:57
7.	"ALLL DAY"	Brust, Lucas, Brandon Hood, Jeffrey Steele	3:16
8.	"God Loves Me More"	Brust, Lucas, Matt Alderman, Phil Barton	2:59
9.	"Till the Wheels Fall Off"	Brust, Jaron Boyer, Matt Bronleewe	3:01
10.	"Ain't Startin Tonight"	Brust, Boyer, Tyler	2:52
11.	"The Fighters"	Rodney Clawson, Tom Douglas, Matt Dragstrem	3:40
Total length:			34:22

== Personnel ==
Musicians

- Bruce Bouton – pedal steel guitar
- Steve Brewster – drums
- Preston Brust – vocals
- Howard Duck – Hammond B-3 organ
- Tommy Harden – drums
- Evan Hutchings – drums
- Mike Johnson – pedal steel guitar
- Chris Lucas – vocals
- Pat McGrath – banjo, bouzouki, acoustic guitar, mando
- Rob McNelley – electric guitar
- Steve Mackey – bass guitar
- Josh Matheny – dobro
- James Mitchell – electric guitar
- Russ Pahl – pedal steel guitar
- Alison Prestwood – bass guitar
- Lindsay Rimes – banjo, bass guitar, acoustic guitar, electric guitar, keyboards, synthesizer strings, synthesizer, background vocals
- Jeff Roach – Hammond B-3 organ, piano
- Jerry Roe – drums
- Ilya Toshinsky – banjo, mando
- Michael Tyler – background vocals

Production

- Danielle Blakey – vocal engineer
- Jerome Bunke – production supervision
- Adam Engelhardt – engineer
- Dan Frizsell – engineer
- Taylor Pollert – assistant engineer
- Sam Raymond – assistant engineer
- Lindsay Rimes – mixing, producer, programming
- David Ross – executive producer
- Leon Zervos – mastering

== Charts ==
=== Album ===
Chart (2016)	Peak position
US Billboard 200	131
US Top Country Albums (Billboard)	14
Chart (2019)	Peak position
Australian Digital Albums (ARIA)	45
