= Tangled Up (Thomas Rhett album) =

Studio album by Thomas Rhett
- Released: September 25, 2015
- Recorded: 2015
- Studio: Starstruck Studios, Major Bob Studios and Sub-Level 03 (Nashville, Tennessee); Atlantic Studios (Hollywood, California); Elysian Sound (Los Angeles, California)
- Genre: Country, pop
- Length: 44:21
- Label: Valory
- Producer: Thomas Rhett; Jesse Frasure; Dann Huff; Chris DeStefano; Joe London; Julian Bunetta; Jaren Johnston; Lindsay Rimes; Carl Falk

Thomas Rhett chronology
It Goes Like This (2013)	Tangled Up (2015)	Life Changes (2017)

Singles from Tangled Up
- 1. "Crash and Burn" Released: April 27, 2015; 2. "Die a Happy Man" Released: September 28, 2015; 3. "T-Shirt" Released: February 16, 2016; 4. "Vacation" Released: June 13, 2016; 5. "Star of the Show" Released: October 3, 2016

Tangled Up is the second studio album by American country music singer Thomas Rhett. It was released on September 25, 2015, via Valory Music Group. The album's lead single "Crash and Burn", was released to radio on April 27, 2015. The album's second single, "Die a Happy Man" was released to country radio on September 28, 2015, but was available for download as a pre-order for the album on September 18, 2015.

== Reception ==
Professional ratings
Review scores
Source	Rating
AllMusic	4/5 stars
Billboard	3.5/5 stars

=== Critical ===
Stephen Thomas Erlewine of Allmusic thought that the Thomas Rhett's second album feels like an album "where the singer/songwriter comes into his own" and rated the album 4 stars out of 5. He thought that Rhett "displays an omnivorous cultural appetite" in the album where Rhett might be "dropping passing allusions to Guns N' Roses and Third Eye Blind" to using disco beat. He judged Rhett to be "a true pop artist, harnessing the trends of his time and turning them into music that's hard to resist." Billboard also picked up on the disco influence, noting that songs in the album, such as "Tangled", "sound as Saturday Night Fever’d as anything recorded by a male country star in decades", but wondered whether "country radio will fully embrace their Nashville disco or ignore it."

=== Commercial ===
Tangled Up debuted on the Billboard 200 at No. 6 and Top Country Albums at No. 3, with 76,000 units sold, 63,000 of which are pure album sales. It reached No. 2 on the Top Country Albums chart in its fourth week. The album was certified Platinum by the RIAA on September 20, 2016. The album has sold over 598,900 copies in the US as of September 2017.

== Track listing ==
Tangled Up – Standard edition
No.	Title	Writer(s)	Producer(s)	Length
1.	"Anthem"	Nicolle Galyon; Shane McAnally; Jimmy Robbins	Dann Huff; Jesse Frasure	3:13
2.	"Crash and Burn"	Frasure; Chris Stapleton	Huff; Frasure	3:10
3.	"South Side"	Thomas Rhett; Frasure; Stapleton	Huff; Frasure	2:51
4.	"Die a Happy Man"	Rhett; Sean Douglas; Joe Spargur	Huff; Frasure	3:46
5.	"Vacation"	Rhett; Thomas Allen; Harold Brown; Morris Dickerson; Douglas; Gerry Goldstein; Leroy Jordan; Charles Miller; Lee Osker; Andreas Schuller; Howard Scott; Spargur; Ricky Reed; John Ryan	Huff; Frasure	3:43
6.	"Like It's the Last Time"	Rhett; Rhett Akins; Ben Hayslip	Huff; Frasure	3:10
7.	"T-Shirt"	Ashley Gorley; Luke Laird; McAnally	Huff; Frasure	3:45
8.	"Single Girl"	Rhett; Akins; Ross Copperman; Hayslip	Huff; Frasure	3:18
9.	"The Day You Stop Looking Back"	Jaren Johnston; Laird	Huff; Frasure	3:25
10.	"Tangled"	Chris DeStefano; Adam Hoffman; Matt Lipkins; Josh Osborne; Scott Schwartz	Huff; Frasure	3:33
11.	"Playing with Fire" (featuring Jordin Sparks)	Rhett; Akins; Gorley	DeStefano	3:26
12.	"I Feel Good" (featuring LunchMoney Lewis)	Rhett; Douglas; Teddy Geiger; Jacob Hindlin; Gamal Lewis; Charlie Puth; Spargur	Joe London	3:16
13.	"Learned It from the Radio"	Galyon; Gorley; Robbins	DeStefano	3:39
Total length:				44:21

Tangled Up – Deluxe edition
No.	Title	Writer(s)	Producer(s)	Length
14.	"Star of the Show"	Rhett; Akins; Hayslip	London; Julian Bunetta; Rhett	3:02
15.	"American Spirit"	Rhett; DeStefano; Johnston	Frasure; Johnston; Rhett	3:38
16.	"Background Music"	Rhett; Akins; Hayslip; Lindsay Rimes	Frasure; Rimes; Rhett	2:50
17.	"Playing with Fire" (featuring Danielle Bradbery)	Rhett; Akins; Gorley	DeStefano	3:26
18.	"Die a Happy Man (The Remix)" (featuring Tori Kelly)	Rhett; Douglas; Spargur	Carl Falk	3:29
Total length:				60:00

== Personnel ==
Musicians

- Thomas Rhett – lead vocals
- Charlie Judge – keyboards
- Matt Stanfield – keyboards
- Jesse Frasure – programming
- Joe London – keyboards, programming, electric guitar, bass
- Chris DeStefano – keyboards, acoustic piano, programming, acoustic guitar, electric guitar, banjo, steel guitar, bass, drums, backing vocals
- Charlie Puth – keyboards (12), backing vocals (12)
- Dann Huff – electric guitar
- Rob McNelley – electric guitar
- Chris Stapleton – electric guitar, backing vocals
- Derek Wells – electric guitar
- Danny Rader – acoustic guitar
- Paul Franklin – steel guitar
- Teddy Geiger – bass
- Jimmie Lee Sloas – bass
- Chris Kimmerer – drums
- Byron "Mr. Talkbox" Chambers – talk box
- Sean Douglas – backing vocals
- Russell Terrell – backing vocals
- Jordin Sparks – vocals (11)
- LunchMoney Lewis – vocals (12)
- Danielle Bradbury – vocals (17)
- Tori Kelly – vocals (18)

Technical and design

- Jesse Frasure – recording (1–10)
- Steve Marcantonio – recording (1–10)
- Chris DeStefano – recording (11, 13)
- Joe London – recording (12)
- Shawn Daugherty – recording assistant (1–10)
- Seth Morton – recording assistant (1–10), additional recording (4, 5, 9, 10)
- Russell Terrell – additional recording (1, 2, 4–10)
- Justin Niebank – mixing at Blackbird Studio (Nashville, Tennessee) and Hound's Ear Studio (Franklin, Tennessee)
- Drew Bollman – mix assistant
- David Huff – digital editing
- Sean Neff – digital editing
- Adam Ayan – mastering at Gateway Mastering (Portland, Maine)
- Mike "Frog" Griffith – production coordinator
- Laurel Kittleson – production coordinator
- Alicia Matthews – production coordinator
- Becky Reiser – art direction, graphic design
- Sandi Spika Borchetta – art direction
- Abbey Lanigan – graphic design
- John Shearer – cover photography
- Joseph Llanes – additional photography

== Charts ==
=== Weekly charts ===
Weekly chart performance for Tangled Up
Chart (2015–2017)	Peak position
Australian Albums (ARIA)	77
Canadian Albums (Billboard)	2
UK Albums (OCC)	80
US Billboard 200	6
US Top Country Albums (Billboard)	2

=== Year-end charts ===
Year-end chart performance for Tangled Up
Chart (2015)	Position
US Billboard 200	141
US Top Country Albums (Billboard)	27
Chart (2016)	Position
Canadian Albums (Billboard)	41
US Billboard 200	21
US Top Country Albums (Billboard)	7
Chart (2017)	Position
US Billboard 200	59
US Top Country Albums (Billboard)	9
Chart (2018)	Position
US Billboard 200	159
US Top Country Albums (Billboard)	19
Chart (2019)	Position
US Top Country Albums (Billboard)	24
Chart (2020)	Position
US Top Country Albums (Billboard)	45

=== Decade-end charts ===
Decade-end chart performance for Tangled Up
Chart (2010–2019)	Position
US Billboard 200	169
US Top Country Albums (Billboard)	12

== Certifications ==
Certifications for Tangled Up
Region	Certification	Certified units/sales
Canada (Music Canada)	Platinum	80,000^{‡}
United States (RIAA)	2× Platinum	598,900
^{‡} Sales+streaming figures based on certification alone.
