= LoCash =

American country music duo

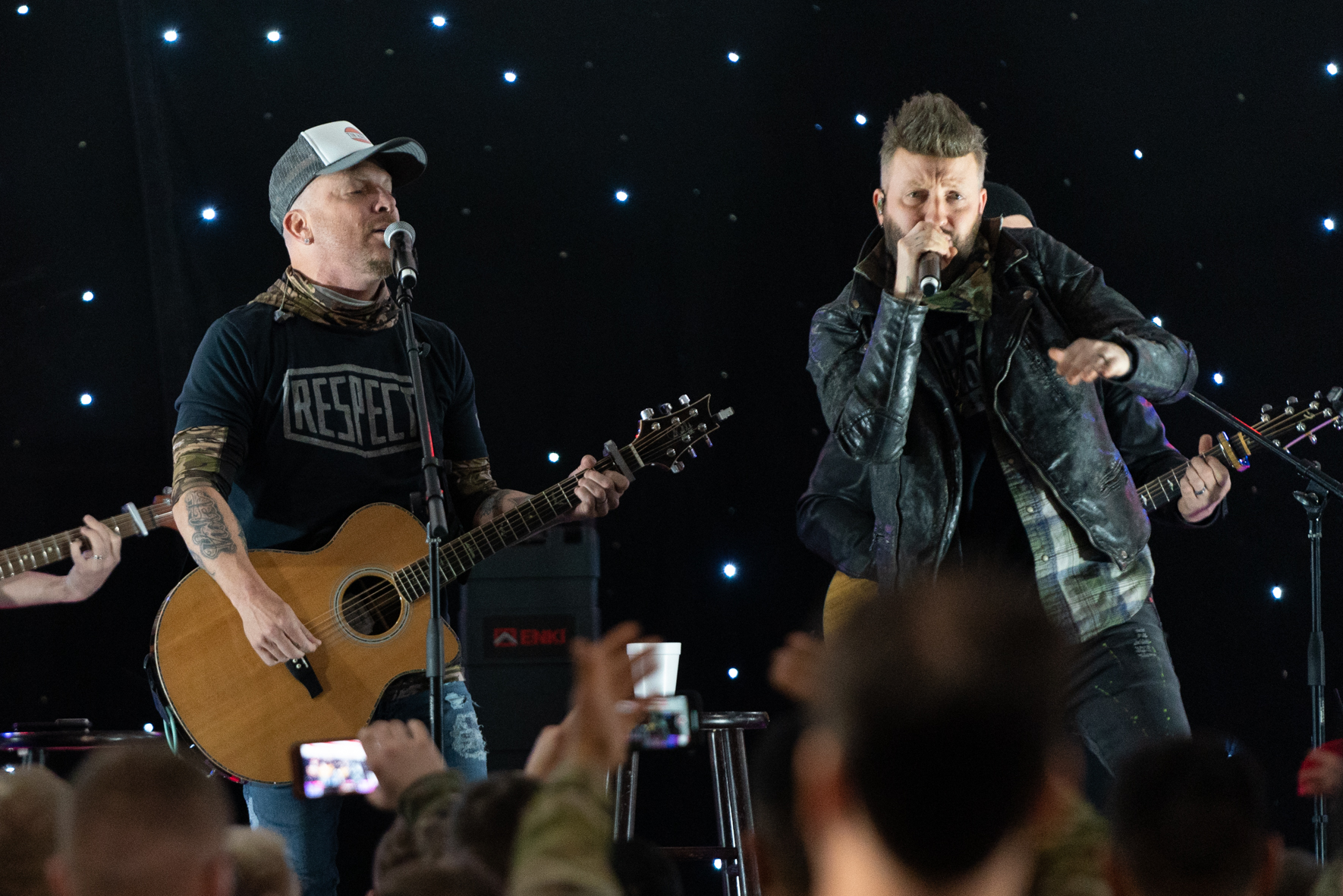
- Chris Lucas (left) and Preston Brust performing in January 2020

Background information
- Also known as: LoCash Cowboys
- Origin: Nashville, Tennessee, U.S.
- Genre: Country
- Years active: 2008–present
- Labels: R&J; Average Joes; Reviver; Wheelhouse
- Members: Preston Brust; Chris Lucas

LoCash (stylized in all caps), formerly known as LoCash Cowboys, is an American country music duo from Nashville. It consists of Chris Tyler Lucas and Preston Samuel Brust, both of whom are vocalists, songwriters, and guitarists. They have released 3 studio albums, one each for Average Joes Entertainment, Reviver Records, and Wheelhouse. In 2024, the duo started their own record label, Galaxy Record Label. They have charted 4 songs on Billboard Hot Country Songs and 13 songs on the Country Airplay chart. Their highest-charting singles are "I Know Somebody" and "Hometown Home", which topped Country Airplay in 2016 and 2025. In addition to their own material, the members of LoCash co-wrote Keith Urban's "You Gonna Fly" and Tim McGraw's "Truck Yeah".

== History ==
LoCash Cowboys was founded in 2008 in Nashville by Preston Brust (born in Kokomo, Indiana) and Chris Lucas (born in Baltimore, Maryland), both of whom are vocalists and songwriters.

The duo first signed to R&J Records (formerly Stroudavarious Records), for which they released three singles. The first, "Here Comes Summer", debuted at No. 60 on Hot Country Songs for the week ending May 8, 2010, which was made into a music video that aired on CMT; the duo's second single, "Keep in Mind", charted within the top 40 in early 2011 while the follow-up "You Got Me" reached No. 52.

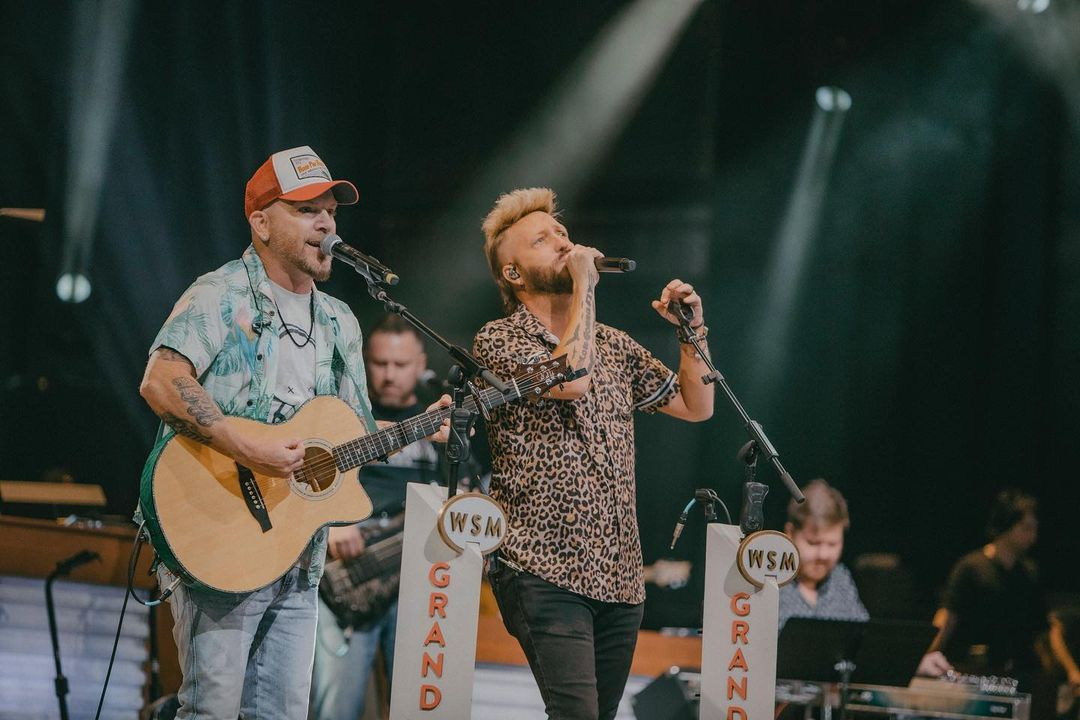
LoCash on stage in 2022

In 2012, the LoCash Cowboys released the single "C.O.U.N.T.R.Y." through Average Joes Entertainment. The song was originally intended to be the fourth single from their debut album, but was delayed due to the closing of R&J Records. The video premiered on July 31, 2012 on GAC. A dance remix of "C.O.U.N.T.R.Y." featuring Colt Ford was also released, and was included on the album Mud Digger, Vol. 3, also from Average Joes.

Brust and Lucas co-wrote Keith Urban's 2011 single "You Gonna Fly" and Tim McGraw's 2012 single "Truck Yeah".

By 2015, the duo had dropped "Cowboys" and released a new single as LoCash: "I Love This Life", via Reviver Records. It became their first Top 10 hit overall, reaching number 5 on the Billboard Hot Country Songs and number 2 on the Country Airplay charts, respectively. EP album's second single, "I Know Somebody" was released to country radio on February 22, 2016. It reached number one on the Billboard charts in October 2016. The duo was nominated for the Academy of Country Music's New Duo or Group in 2017. "Ring on Every Finger", released in December 2016, is the third single from The Fighters. Thomas Rhett wrote the song, and had planned to include it on his second album Tangled Up.

In August 2018, LoCash signed a record deal with Broken Bow Records' Wheelhouse Records imprint. Their first release for the label is "Feels Like a Party", which they co-wrote with Tyler Hubbard of Florida Georgia Line. Wheelhouse released the corresponding album, Brothers, in March 2019.

This was followed in 2025 by Bet the Farm, their first release via their own Galaxy label. The album includes the single "Hometown Home".

== Discography ==
Studio albums

- LoCash Cowboys (2008)
- LoCash Cowboys (2013)
- The Fighters (2016)
- Brothers (2019)
- Bet the Farm (2025)

== Awards and nominations ==
Year	Award	Category	Recipient/Work	Result	Ref
2017	ACM Awards	New Vocal Duo or Group of the Year	LOCASH	Nominated	
2017	CMT Music Awards	Duo Video of the Year	"I Know Somebody"	Nominated	
2017	Country Music Association Awards	Vocal Duo of the Year	LOCASH	Nominated	
2019	CMT Music Awards	Duo Video of the Year	"Feels Like A Party"	Nominated	
2022	ACM Awards	Vocal Duo of the Year	LOCASH	Nominated	
2022	CMA Awards	Vocal Duo of the Year	LOCASH	Nominated	
