= Die a Happy Man =

2015 single by Thomas Rhett

Single by Thomas Rhett

from the album Tangled Up
- Released: September 28, 2015
- Recorded: 2015
- Genre: Country pop; soft rock
- Length: 3:47
- Label: Valory; Republic
- Songwriters: Thomas Rhett; Sean Douglas; Joe Spargur
- Producers: Dann Huff; Jesse Frasure

Thomas Rhett singles chronology
"Crash and Burn" (2015)	"Die a Happy Man" (2015)	"T-Shirt" (2016)

"Die a Happy Man" is a song co-written and recorded by American country music singer Thomas Rhett. It was released on September 28, 2015, by Valory Music Group as the second single from his second studio album, Tangled Up. Rhett wrote the song with Sean Douglas and Joe Spargur. American singer Tori Kelly is featured on a pop remix included on the deluxe edition. The song peaked at number 21 on the US Billboard Hot 100, becoming his highest-charting single on that chart.

== Content ==
"Die a Happy Man" is composed in the key of D major, featuring a moderately slow tempo and a chord progression of D-Bm-G-D. The song features organ, acoustic guitar, and steel guitar. Rhett wrote the song about his wife, Lauren, and said he was inspired by Ed Sheeran's "Thinking Out Loud". According to an interview with Smooth Radio, he wrote the song with Sean Douglas and Joe Spargur while "in a parking lot in Arkansas".

The chorus of the song is similar to that of "Emerald Dream" by Niklas Johansson that came out in 2017.

== Reception ==
=== Critical ===
Billy Dukes of Taste of Country reviewed the song favorably, saying that "Thomas Rhett may have just released the love song of the year. "Die a Happy Man" is a slow burner that melts like candle wax. With just a few pulls from a blues-soaked guitar, the mood is set for this increasingly dynamic singer to heat up any room." Taste of Country and American Songwriter have both named "Die a Happy Man" as Rhett's best song.

=== Commercial ===
On the week of its release, the song debuted at number 17 on the Hot Country Songs chart, number 92 on the Billboard Hot 100 and number 41 on the Country Airplay chart, with 40,000 copies sold for the week. The second week, it rose to number 30 on the Country Airplay chart, and sold 33,000 copies. It reached number one on the Country Digital Songs chart in its third week, selling 39,000 copies. It topped the Hot Country Songs chart in its sixth week, and then topped the Country Airplay chart in January 2016, staying at number one on all three country charts simultaneously for multiple weeks. On the Country Airplay chart for the week of January 30, 2016, the song logged its fifth consecutive week at number one, making it the first song to spend more than four weeks at number one since Lady Antebellum's "Need You Now" stayed at the top for five weeks in 2009, and the first song by a solo male artist to spend five weeks at the top since Kenny Chesney's "Never Wanted Nothing More" in August 2007. The following week, it topped the Country Airplay chart for a sixth and final week, becoming the first song to spend six weeks at number one since Taylor Swift's "Our Song" in December 2007 – January 2008. It peaked at number 21 on the Hot 100 for the week of January 2, 2016.

The single was certified 2× Platinum on May 18, 2016, 3× Platinum on February 21, 2017 and by August 2021 was certified 7× Platinum. The single reached the one million download sales in February 2016. As of September 2017, "Die a Happy Man" had sold 1,914,000 downloads.

== Music video ==
The music video was directed by TK McKamy and produced by Dan Atchison. The video was shot on location on the North Shore of Oahu in Hawaii at the same time as his video for "Vacation". It premiered in June 2015. Rhett's wife, Lauren, appears in the video.

== Chart performance ==
"Die a Happy Man" topped the Hot Country Songs chart on November 14, 2015. The song remained on top for seventeen weeks before being knocked off by "You Should Be Here" performed by Cole Swindell.

=== Thomas Rhett version ===
Chart (2015–2016)	Peak position
Canada Hot 100 (Billboard)	35
Canada Country (Billboard)	1
US Billboard Hot 100	21
US Adult Pop Airplay (Billboard)	25
US Country Airplay (Billboard)	1
US Hot Country Songs (Billboard)	1

=== Year-end charts ===
Chart (2015)	Position
US Country Airplay (Billboard)	89
US Hot Country Songs (Billboard)	59

Chart (2016)	Position
US Billboard Hot 100	64
US Country Airplay (Billboard)	5
US Hot Country Songs (Billboard)	2

=== Decade-end charts ===
Chart (2010–2019)	Position
US Hot Country Songs (Billboard)	15

=== All-time charts ===
Chart (All-time)	Position
US Hot Country Songs (Billboard)	78

=== Certifications ===
Region	Certification	Certified units/sales
Australia (ARIA)	Gold	35,000^{‡}
Canada (Music Canada)	Diamond	800,000^{‡}
United States (RIAA)	Diamond	1,914,000
^{‡} Sales+streaming figures based on certification alone.

== Nelly version ==
"Die a Happy Man"

Single by Nelly
- Released: February 5, 2016
- Genre: Hip-hop; R&B
- Length: 3:34
- Label: RECORDS; Epic
- Songwriters: Thomas Rhett; Sean Douglas; Joe Spargur

Nelly singles chronology
"I Don't Wanna Go to Bed" (2015)	"Die a Happy Man" (2016)	"Millionaire" (2016)

"Die a Happy Man" was covered by American rapper Nelly in 2016 and released as a single on February 5, 2016 by RECORDS and Epic Records. His version draws inspiration from hip-hop music and dance music and employs synthesizers.

=== Commercial performance ===
His version debuted at number 83 on the Billboard Hot 100 with first-week US sales of 35,000.

=== Track listing ===
- Digital download
1. "Die a Happy Man" — 3:34

=== Charts ===
Chart (2016)	Peak position
Canada Digital Songs (Billboard)	41
Canada AC (Billboard)	43
US Billboard Hot 100	83
US Pop Airplay (Billboard)	32

== Awards and nominations ==
Year	Award	Category	Result	Ref.
2016	Academy of Country Music Awards	Single Record of the Year	Won	
2016	Billboard Music Awards	Top Country Song	Won	
2016	American Country Countdown Awards	Song of the Year	Won	
2016	American Country Countdown Awards	Digital Song of the Year	Nominated	
2016	Country Music Association Awards	Single of the Year	Won	
2017	Academy of Country Music Awards	Song of the Year	Won	
2017	Grammy Awards	Best Country Song	Nominated	
