= I Know Somebody =

Single by LoCash

from the album The Fighters
- Released: February 22, 2016
- Genre: Country pop
- Length: 3:18
- Label: Reviver
- Songwriters: Ross Copperman; Jeremy Stover; Rhett Akins
- Producer: Lindsay Rimes

LoCash singles chronology
"I Love This Life" (2015)	"I Know Somebody" (2016)	"Ring on Every Finger" (2016)

"I Know Somebody" is a song recorded by American country music duo LoCash (formerly LoCash Cowboys). It was released to radio on February 22, 2016 as the second single from The Fighters. The song was written by Rhett Akins, Ross Copperman and Jeremy Stover. "I Know Somebody" reached number one on the Billboard Country Airplay chart, giving LoCash their first number-one country hit. It also peaked at numbers 4 and 52 on both the Hot Country Songs and Hot 100 charts respectively. The song was certified Gold by the Recording Industry Association of America (RIAA), and has sold 174,000 copies in that country as of November 2016. It received similar chart success in Canada, reaching number 8 on the Canada Country chart and number 94 on the Canadian Hot 100.

A music video directed by Ry & Drew Cox was created to promote the single.

== Critical reception ==
Billy Dukes of Taste of Country reviewed the song favorably, saying that "A catchy chorus infuses “I Know Somebody” with a jolt of energy before the second verse brings the roller coaster ride back down for a moment. There are a few non-organic instruments to be found, but this is a band that's long been comfortable stretching the definition of country music. Asking LoCash to rely on banjo and fiddle would be like asking George Strait to wear skinny jeans."

== Music video ==
The music video was directed by Ry & Drew Cox and premiered in June 2016.

== Chart performance ==
The song has sold 174,000 copies in the US as of November 2016.

Chart (2016)	Peak position
Canada Hot 100 (Billboard)	94
Canada Country (Billboard)	8
US Billboard Hot 100	52
US Country Airplay (Billboard)	1
US Hot Country Songs (Billboard)	4

=== Year end charts ===
Chart (2016)	Position
US Country Airplay (Billboard)	21
US Hot Country Songs (Billboard)	43

== Certifications ==
Region	Certification	Certified units/sales
United States (RIAA)	Gold	500,000^{‡}
^{‡} Sales+streaming figures based on certification alone.
