= I Love This Life (LoCash song) =

Single by LoCash

from the album The Fighters
- Released: February 23, 2015
- Genre: Country; country rock
- Length: 3:28
- Label: Reviver
- Songwriters: Danny Myrick; Chris Janson; Chris Lucas; Preston Brust
- Producer: Lindsay Rimes

LoCash singles chronology
"Best Seat in the House" (2013)	"I Love This Life" (2015)	"I Know Somebody" (2016)

"I Love This Life" is a song co-written and recorded by American country music duo LoCash (formerly LoCash Cowboys). It was released to radio on February 23, 2015 as the lead single to their third studio album, The Fighters. The duo wrote the song with Chris Janson and Danny Myrick.

== Critical reception ==
Website Taste of Country reviewed the song favorably, saying that "The uptempo country-rocker leans more toward the middle than some of their previous party cuts, but it’s still stamped with this duo’s own unique brand mark" and "one could argue it’s been written before. But it’s a story worth reinventing time and again."

== Commercial performance ==
"I Love This Life" first entered on the Billboard Country Airplay chart at number 56 on chart dated March 14, 2015. The song took 47 weeks to peak at number 2 on the airplay chart in January 2016, making it the duo's first Top 10 hit. It debuted on Hot Country Songs at number 50 on the chart of June 6, 2015, and Billboard Hot 100 at number 97 on November 14, 2015. It peaked at number 5 on Hot Country Songs and number 56 of Hot 100 on Billboard charts of February 6, 2016. The song has sold 358,000 copies in the US as of June 2016.

== Music video ==
The music video was directed by Stokes Nielson (of The Lost Trailers) and premiered in August 2015.

== Charts and certifications ==
=== Weekly charts ===
Chart (2015–2016)	Peak position
Canada Hot 100 (Billboard)	74
Canada Country (Billboard)	4
US Billboard Hot 100	56
US Country Airplay (Billboard)	2
US Hot Country Songs (Billboard)	5

=== Certifications ===
Region	Certification	Certified units/sales
United States (RIAA)	Platinum	1,000,000^{‡}
^{‡} Sales+streaming figures based on certification alone.

=== Year-end charts ===
Chart (2015)	Position
US Country Airplay (Billboard)	73
US Hot Country Songs (Billboard)	72

Chart (2016)	Position
US Country Airplay (Billboard)	50
US Hot Country Songs (Billboard)	69
