= Dan Davidson =

Canadian singer-songwriter (born 1983)

- Born: 1983 (age 42–43); Edmonton, Alberta, Canada
- Genres: Country; rock
- Occupation: Singer-songwriter
- Years active: 2003–present
- Labels: Skysong; Nuu Noise; ABC
- Formerly of: Tupelo Honey
- Website: dandavidsonmusic.com

Daniel Davidson (born in 1983) is a Canadian country singer and songwriter. He is best known as the guitarist and later lead vocalist of rock group Tupelo Honey. Since 2014, Davidson has been pursuing a solo career in country music. His second solo single, "Found", reached 16 on the Canada Country chart, making it the highest-charting independent single on Canadian country radio.

== Career ==
In 2003, Davidson joined five fellow musicians from Grant MacEwan College to form the rock band Tupelo Honey. He released three extended plays with the band between 2006 and 2008 as the guitarist and backing vocalist. When their lead singer parted ways with the band in 2010, Davidson took over that role.

In addition to his work with Tupelo Honey, Davidson also served as a songwriter and producer for other Canadian artists during this period, as part of his partnership with Red Brick Songs. Following the release of Brave New World in 2014, the band has been on hiatus and Davidson redirected his efforts towards a solo musical career in country music. He is currently unsigned and independently released his first solo single, "Unkiss Her", in July 2015. Davidson worked with Jeff Dalziel, Karen Kosowski, Troy Samson, Alee, Emma-Lee, and Pete Lesperance on his debut record.

His second single, "Found", was released in March 2016. It became his first song to chart on the Billboard Canada Country chart, where it reached a peak of 16. This made it the highest-charting independent single by a Canadian country artist.

== Discography ==
=== Extended plays ===
Title	Details
Songs for Georgia	Release date: October 27, 2017; Label: Independent
Juliet	Release date: February 27, 2019; Label: Independent
6 Songs to Midnight	Release date: February 25, 2022; Label: Nuu Noise / Independent
Nineteen Eighty Something	Release date: October 26, 2023; Label: Nuu Noise / Independent

=== Singles ===
Year	Title	Peak positions		Certifications	Album
Year	Title	CAN Country	AUS Country	Certifications	Album
2015	"Unkiss Me"	—	—		Songs for Georgia
2016	"Found"	16	—	MC: Platinum	Songs for Georgia
2016	"Barn Burner"	19	—		Songs for Georgia
2017	"Say We Did"	—	—		Songs for Georgia
2018	"Let's Go There"	40	—		—N/a
2020	"Church"	49	—		—N/a
2021	"Roll With It" (feat. The Road Hammers)	—	11		6 Songs to Midnight
2021	"Really Shouldn't Drink Around You" (feat. Hayley Jensen)	—	28		6 Songs to Midnight
2022	"Blindspot"	—	50		6 Songs to Midnight
2022	"Girl Drinks Beer" (feat. Travis Collins)	—	—		6 Songs to Midnight
2023	"If These Streets Could Talk"	—	—		Nineteen Eighty Something
2023	"He Met a Girl"	60	—		Nineteen Eighty Something
2024	"Won't Forget" (featuring Tim Hicks and Max Jackson)	—	22		TBA
2025	"Buckle Rubbin'"	58	30		TBA
2025	"Ain't That the Truth"	55	—		TBA

=== Music videos ===
Year	Video	Director
2016	"Found"	Travis Nesbitt
2016	"Barn Burner"	Travis Nesbitt
2017	"Say We Did"	Travis Nesbitt
2018	"Lets Go There"	Travis Nesbitt
2018	"Cinderella"	Travis Nesbitt
2019	"Can't Help Myself"	Travis Nesbitt
2019	"These Are My People"	Travis Nesbitt
2019	"Church"	Travis Nesbitt
2019	"Unkiss Her"	Travis Nesbitt
2020	"I Do"	Travis Nesbitt

== Awards and nominations ==
Year	Award	Category	Nominee/Work	Result	Ref
2016	Alberta Country Music Awards	Single of the Year	"Found"	Won	
2016	Alberta Country Music Awards	Song of the Year (with Clayton Bellamy)	"Found"	Won	
2016	Alberta Country Music Awards	Video of the Year	"Found"	Won	
2016	Alberta Country Music Awards	Rising Star	Dan Davidson	Won	
2016	Alberta Country Music Awards	Male Artist of the Year	Dan Davidson	Nominated	
2017	Canadian Radio Music Awards	Best New Group or Solo Artist: Country	"Found"	Nominated	
2017	Western Canadian Music Awards	Country Artist of the Year	Dan Davidson	Nominated	
2017	Western Canadian Music Awards	BreakOut Artist of the Year	Dan Davidson	Nominated	
2017	Canadian Country Music Association	Rising Star Award	Dan Davidson	Nominated	
2017	Canadian Country Music Association	Songwriter of the Year (with Clayton Bellamy)	"Found"	Nominated	
2017	Alberta Country Music Awards	Male Artist of the Year	"Dan Davidson"	Won	
2017	Alberta Country Music Awards	Fans Choice	"Dan Davidson"	Won	
2017	Alberta Country Music Awards	Single of the Year ("Barn Burner")	"Dan Davidson"	Won	
2017	Alberta Country Music Awards	Song of the Year (with Clayton Bellamy)	"Barn Burner"	Won	
2019	Western Canadian Music Awards	Country Artist of the Year	Dan Davidson	Nominated	
2020	Canadian Country Music Association	Interactive Artist of the Year	Dan Davidson	Nominated	
2020	Western Canadian Music Awards	Country Artist of the Year	Dan Davidson	Nominated	
2022	Canadian Country Music Association	Record Producer of the Year	"Wanted You To"	Nominated	
2024	Canadian Country Music Association	Design Team	Nineteen Eighty Something (with Travis Nesbitt)	Nominated	
2024	Canadian Country Music Association	Radio Personality of the Year	Dan Davidson, Stella Stevens - CFCW-FM	Nominated	
2025	Canadian Country Music Association	Musical Collaboration of the Year	"Won't Forget" (with Tim Hicks, Max Jackson)	Nominated	
2025	Canadian Country Music Association	Country Personality(ies) of the Year	Dan Davidson, Stella Stevens - CFCW-FM	Nominated	
