= Florida Georgia Line discography =

Band discography

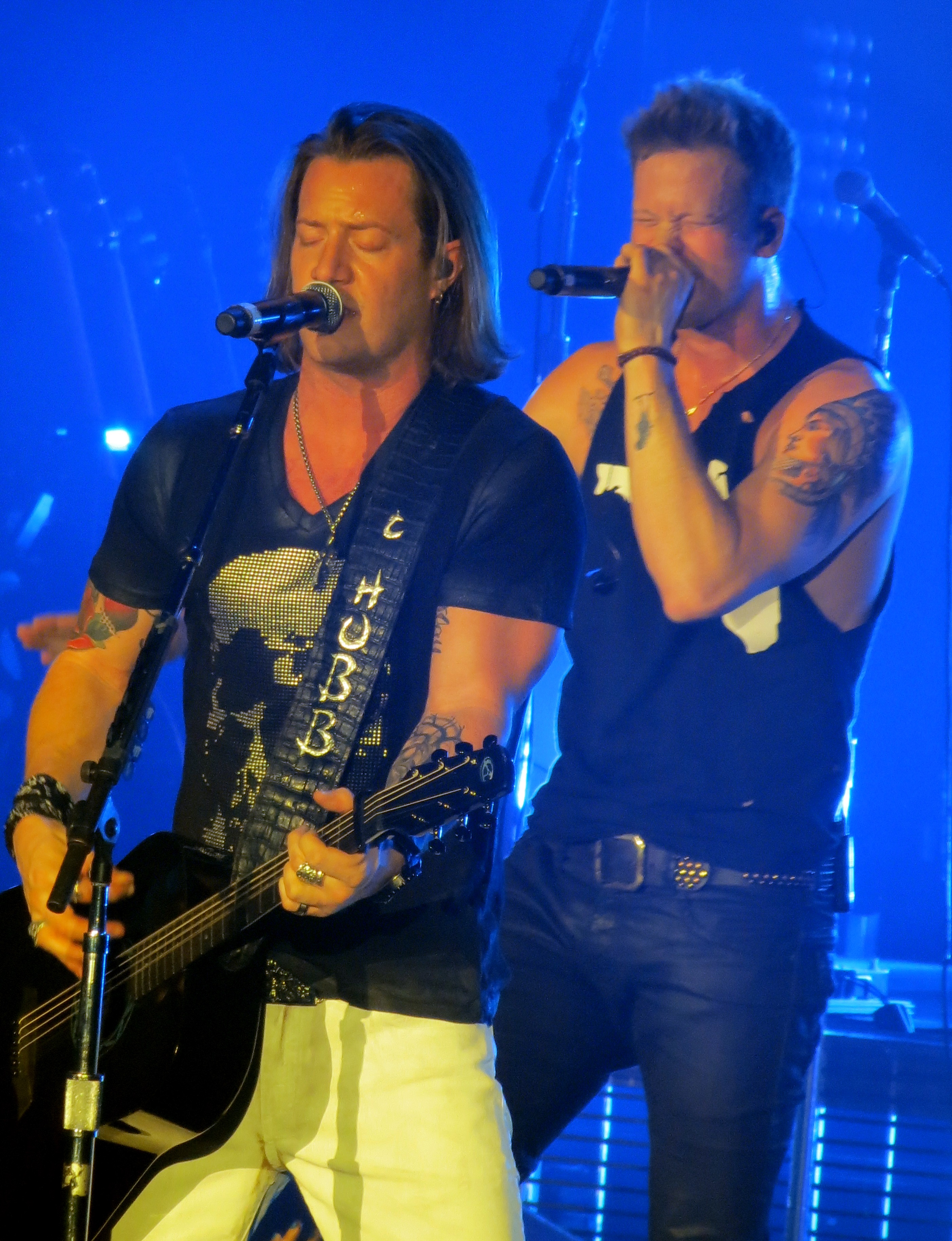
- Studio albums: 5
- EPs: 5
- Compilation albums: 2
- Singles: 19
- Music videos: 29

American country music duo Florida Georgia Line has released five studio albums, two compilation albums, four extended plays, 19 singles (as a lead artist), four featured singles, 27 other charted songs, and 29 music videos. Eighteen of their singles have reached number one on the US Billboard Hot Country Songs, Country Airplay, or Canada Country charts.

== Albums ==
=== Studio albums ===
Title	Album details	Peak chart positions				Certification	Sales
Title	Album details	US	US Country	AUS	CAN	Certification	Sales
Here's to the Good Times	Released: December 4, 2012; Label: Republic Nashville; Format: CD, digital download	4	1	65	8	RIAA: 2× Platinum; MC: Platinum	US: 2,369,400
Anything Goes	Released: October 14, 2014; Label: Republic Nashville; Format: CD, digital download	1	1	20	2	RIAA: Platinum; MC: Platinum	US: 858,000; CAN: 16,000
Dig Your Roots	Released: August 26, 2016; Label: BMLG; Format: CD, digital download	2	1	7	2	RIAA: Platinum	US: 444,300
Can't Say I Ain't Country	Released: February 15, 2019; Label: BMLG; Format: CD, vinyl, digital download, streaming	4	1	7	4	RIAA: Gold; MC: Platinum	US: 107,000
Life Rolls On	Released: February 12, 2021; Label: BMLG; Format: CD, vinyl, digital download, streaming	21	3	43	18		
"—" denotes releases that did not chart

=== Compilation albums ===
Title	Album details	Peak chart positions		Sales
Title	Album details	US	CAN	Sales
The Acoustic Sessions	Release date: October 18, 2019; Label: BMLG, Big Loud; Format: CD, vinyl, digital download, streaming	— (Note: The Acoustic Sessions did not enter the Billboard 200, but peaked at No. 57 on the Billboard Top Album Sales)	—	US: 4,900
Greatest Hits	Release date: November 11, 2022; Label: BMLG, Big Loud; Format: CD, vinyl, digital download, streaming	—	44	

== Extended plays ==
Title	Extended play details	Peak chart positions			
Title	Extended play details	US	US Country	US Indie	CAN
Anything like Me	Released: December 14, 2010; Label: Florida Georgia Line; Format: Digital download	—	—	—	—
It'z Just What We Do	Released: May 15, 2012; Label: Big Loud Mountain; Format: Digital download	105	18	45	—
iTunes Session	Released: January 14, 2014; Label: Republic Nashville; Format: Digital download	63	11	—	—
Florida Georgia Line	Released: June 1, 2018; Label: BMLG; Format: Digital download	72	10	—	28
6-Pack	Released: May 22, 2020; Label: BMLG; Format: Digital download, streaming	50	5	—	36
"—" denotes releases that did not chart

== Singles ==
=== As lead artist ===
Single	Year	Peak chart positions									Certifications	Album
Single	Year	US	US Country	US Country Airplay	US Pop	US Adult	AUS	CAN Country	CAN	UK	Certifications	Album
"Cruise" (solo or featuring Nelly)	2012	4	1	1	7	6	63	1	38	75	RIAA: 14× Platinum; BPI: Silver; MC: 2× Platinum; ARIA: 2× Platinum; RMNZ: 2× Platinum	Here's to the Good Times
"Get Your Shine On"	2013	27	5	1	—	—	—	1	39	—	RIAA: 3× Platinum	Here's to the Good Times
"Round Here"	2013	28	3	1	—	—	—	1	47	—	RIAA: 3× Platinum	Here's to the Good Times
"Stay"	2013	28	1	1	—	—	—	1	39	—	RIAA: 2× Platinum	Here's to the Good Times
"This Is How We Roll" (featuring Luke Bryan)	2014	15	1	2	25	23	—	2	20	—	RIAA: 6× Platinum; ARIA: Platinum; RMNZ: Platinum	Here's to the Good Times
"Dirt"	2014	11	1	1	—	—	—	1	10	—	RIAA: 2× Platinum	Anything Goes
"Sun Daze"	2014	44	3	1	—	—	—	2	41	—	RIAA: Platinum	Anything Goes
"Sippin' on Fire"	2015	40	3	1	—	—	—	1	36	—	RIAA: Platinum	Anything Goes
"Anything Goes"	2015	55	6	3	—	—	—	1	51	—	RIAA: 2× Platinum	Anything Goes
"Confession"	2015	53	7	1	—	—	—	1	73	—	RIAA: Platinum	Anything Goes
"H.O.L.Y."	2016	14	1	1	—	21	94	1	24	—	RIAA: 6× Platinum; ARIA: Gold; RMNZ: Platinum	Dig Your Roots
"May We All" (featuring Tim McGraw)	2016	30	2	1	—	—	—	1	46	—	RIAA: 3× Platinum; ARIA: Gold; RMNZ: Gold	Dig Your Roots
"God, Your Mama, and Me" (featuring Backstreet Boys)	2017	46	4	1	—	—	—	3	79	—	RIAA: 2× Platinum	Dig Your Roots
"Smooth"	2017	89	16	14	—	—	—	11	—	—	RIAA: Gold	Dig Your Roots
"Simple"	2018	32	2	1	—	—	—	1	28	—	RIAA: 2× Platinum; ARIA: Gold; MC: 2× Platinum; RMNZ: Platinum	Can't Say I Ain't Country
"Talk You Out of It"	2018	57	11	11	—	—	—	28	97	—	RIAA: 2× Platinum	Can't Say I Ain't Country
"Blessings"	2019	— (Note: "Blessings" did not enter the Billboard Hot 100, but peaked at number 18 on the Bubbling Under Hot 100 Singles chart.)	23	23	—	—	—	32	—	—	RIAA: Gold	Can't Say I Ain't Country
"I Love My Country"	2020	40	8	2	—	—	—	1	67	—	RIAA: Platinum	Life Rolls On
"Long Live"	2020	45	4	1	—	—	—	1	35	—	RIAA: Platinum; MC: Gold	Life Rolls On
"Lil Bit" (with Nelly)	2021	23	3	42	16	21	—	—	35	—	RIAA: 3× Platinum; MC: 4× Platinum; RMNZ: Gold	Life Rolls On
"—" denotes releases that did not chart

=== As featured artist ===
Title	Year	Peak chart positions										Certifications	Album
Title	Year	US	US Country	US Country Airplay	US Pop	AUS	CAN	CAN Country	NZ	SWE	UK	Certifications	Album
"The South" (The Cadillac Three featuring Dierks Bentley, Florida Georgia Line and Mike Eli)	2013	—	32	33	—	—	—	—	—	—	—		Bury Me in My Boots
"Meant to Be" (Bebe Rexha and Florida Georgia Line) (Note: "Meant to Be" was credited as Bebe Rexha featuring Florida Georgia Line when it was sent to radio. Billboard now credits the song with dual lead billing to Bebe Rexha & Florida Georgia Line in the artists' chart histories.)	2017	2	1	1	2	2	7	7	5	8	11	RIAA: 11× Platinum; ARIA: 8× Platinum; BPI: 2× Platinum; GLF: Gold; MC: Diamond; RMNZ: 7× Platinum	All Your Fault: Pt. 2 and Expectations
"Let Me Go" (Hailee Steinfeld and Alesso featuring Florida Georgia Line and Watt)	2017	40	—	—	14	12	18	—	14	35	30	RIAA: Platinum; ARIA: 5× Platinum; BPI: Platinum; GLF: 2× Platinum; MC: 4× Platinum; RMNZ: 4× Platinum	Non-album single
"Up Down" (Morgan Wallen featuring Florida Georgia Line)	2017	49	5	1	—	—	89	1	—	—	—	RIAA: 5× Platinum; MC: 4× Platinum; RMNZ: Gold	If I Know Me
"Drinkin' Beer. Talkin' God. Amen." (Chase Rice featuring Florida Georgia Line)	2020	24	3	1	—	—	62	4	—	—	—	RIAA: Platinum	The Album
"Thank You Lord" (Chris Tomlin featuring Thomas Rhett and Florida Georgia Line)	2021	—	37	—	—	—	—	—	—	—	—	RIAA: Gold	Chris Tomlin & Friends
"—" denotes releases that did not chart

=== Christmas singles ===
Year	Single	Peak chart positions	Album
Year	Single	US Country Airplay	Album
2020	"Lit This Year"	52	Can't Say I Ain't Country (Expanded Edition)

== Other charted songs ==
Year	Title	Peak chart positions					Certifications	Album
Year	Title	US Country	US Country Airplay	US Christ	US	CAN	Certifications	Album
2012	"Summer Jam" (with Jake Owen)	35	50	—	— (Note: "Summer Jam" did not enter the Billboard Hot 100, but peaked at number seven on the Bubbling Under Hot 100 Singles chart.)	51		Endless Summer (Jake Owen album)
2012	"Here's to the Good Times"	33	—	—	—	84	RIAA: Gold	Here's to the Good Times
2013	"Dayum, Baby" (with Sarah Buxton)	49	—	—	—	—	RIAA: Gold	Here's to the Good Times
2013	"I'm in a Hurry (And Don't Know Why)"	47	—	—	—	82		Alabama & Friends
2013	"Take It Out on Me"	32	—	—	— (Note: "Take It Out on Me" did not enter the Billboard Hot 100, but peaked at number 25 on the Bubbling Under Hot 100 Singles chart.)	84		Here's to the Good Times
2013	"Hands on You"	33	—	—	—	—		Here's to the Good Times
2013	"Headphones"	39	—	—	—	—		Here's to the Good Times
2013	"People Back Home"	42	—	—	—	—		Here's to the Good Times
2014	"Friends in Low Places"	40	—	—	—	—		iTunes Session
2014	"It'z Just What We Do"	48	—	—	—	—		Here's to the Good Times
2014	"Tell Me How You Like It"	22	—	—	—	—	RIAA: Gold	Here's to the Good Times
2014	"Party People"	48	—	—	36	—		Here's to the Good Times
2014	"If I Die Tomorrow"	33	—	—	—	82		Nashville Outlaws: A Tribute to Mötley Crüe
2014	"Bumpin' the Night"	15	—	—	69	55		Anything Goes
2014	"Good Good"	20	—	—	—	68		Anything Goes
2014	"Every Night"	24	51	—	22	—		Anything Goes
2016	"Life Is a Honeymoon" (featuring Ziggy Marley)	44	—	—	—	—		Dig Your Roots
2016	"Island"	48	—	—	—	— (Note: "Island" did not enter the Billboard Canadian Hot 100, but peaked at number 39 on the Hot Canadian Digital Song Sales chart.)		Dig Your Roots
2016	"Summerland"	37	—	—	—	—		Dig Your Roots
2016	"Wish You Were on It"	35	—	—	—	—		Dig Your Roots
2016	"Good Girl, Bad Boy"	50	—	—	—	—		Dig Your Roots
2017	"Last Day Alive" (The Chainsmokers featuring Florida Georgia Line)	—	—	—	— (Note: "Last Day Alive" did not enter the Billboard Hot 100, but peaked at number 19 on the Bubbling Under Hot 100 Singles chart.)	94		Memories...Do Not Open
2018	"Colorado"	41	—	—	—	—		Can't Say I Ain't Country
2018	"Sittin' Pretty"	30	—	—	—	—		Can't Say I Ain't Country
2018	"People Are Different"	40	—	—	—	—		Can't Say I Ain't Country
2019	"Women" (featuring Jason Derulo)	29	—	—	—	— (Note: "Women" did not enter the Billboard Canadian Hot 100, but peaked at number 17 on the Hot Canadian Digital Song Sales chart.)		Can't Say I Ain't Country
2019	"Y'all Boys" (featuring Hardy)	— (Note: "Y’all Boys" did not enter the Hot Country Songs chart, but peaked at number 15 on the Country Digital Song Sales chart.)	—	—	—	—		Can't Say I Ain't Country
2019	"Can't Hide Red" (featuring Jason Aldean)	46	—	—	—	—		Can't Say I Ain't Country
2020	"Second Guessing"	29	—	—	— (Note: "Second Guessing" did not enter the Billboard Hot 100, but peaked at number 24 on the Bubbling Under Hot 100 Singles chart.)	99		Life Rolls On
2020	"Forever Home" (Chris Tomlin featuring Florida Georgia Line)	—	—	48	—	—		Chris Tomlin & Friends
"—" denotes releases that did not chart

== Music videos ==
Year	Video	Director
2012	"Cruise"	Brian Lazzaro
2013	"Get Your Shine On"	Declan Whitebloom
2013	"Cruise" (with Nelly)	Marc Klasfeld
2013	"Round Here"	Peter Zavadil
2013	"Stay"	Peter Zavadil
2013	"It'z Just What We Do"	Michael Monaco
2014	"This Is How We Roll" (with Luke Bryan)	Marc Klasfeld
2014	"Dirt"	Nigel Dick
2014	"Sun Daze"	Marc Klasfeld
2015	"Sippin' on Fire"	Marc Klasfeld
2015	"Anything Goes"	Shaun Silva
2015	"Confession"	TK McKamy
2016	"H.O.L.Y"	TK McKamy
2016	"May We All" (with Tim McGraw)	TK McKamy
2017	"God, Your Mama, and Me" (with Backstreet Boys)	TK McKamy
2017	"Meant to Be" (with Bebe Rexha)	Sophie Muller
2017	"Let Me Go" (with Hailee Steinfeld)	Emil Nava
2017	"Smooth"	TK McKamy, Brian Kelley
2017	"Up Down" (with Morgan Wallen)	Justin Clough
2018	"Simple"	Justin Clough
2018	"Talk You Out of It"	Justin Clough
2019	"Women" (with Jason Derulo)	—N/a
2019	"Blessings"	Justin Clough
2020	"I Love My Country"	TK McKamy
2020	"Second Guessing"	—N/a
2020	"Lit This Year"	—N/a
2021	"Drinkin' Beer. Talkin' God. Amen." (with Chase Rice)	TK McKamy
2021	"Lil Bit"	Christopher Scholar
2021	"Always Gonna Love You"	
