= I Believe in Jesus =

I Believe in Jesus may refer to:

- "I Believe in Jesus", a song by Chris Tomlin from Always (2022)
- "I Believe in Jesus", a song by Donna Summer from The Wanderer (1980)
