= Holy Forever =

2022 song by Chris Tomlin

Single by Chris Tomlin

from the album Always
- Released: March 10, 2023
- Recorded: 2022
- Genre: Worship; CCM
- Length: 5:08
- Label: Sparrow; Capitol CMG
- Songwriters: Jason Ingram; Brian Johnson; Jenn Johnson; Chris Tomlin; Phil Wickham
- Producer: Jonathan Smith

Chris Tomlin singles chronology
| "Always" / "Yahweh (No One)" (2022) | "Holy Forever" (2023) |

Music video
- "Holy Forever" (Lyrics) on YouTube

"Holy Forever" is a song by American contemporary Christian musician Chris Tomlin. It impacted Christian radio in the United States on March 10, 2023, as the fourth single from Tomlin's fourteenth studio album, Always (2022). Tomlin co-wrote the song with Brian Johnson, Jason Ingram, Jenn Johnson, and Phil Wickham. Jonathan Smith handled the production of the single.

"Holy Forever" peaked at No. 1 on the US Hot Christian Songs chart published by Billboard. It was nominated for the Grammy Award for Best Contemporary Christian Music Performance/Song at the 2023 Grammy Awards.

In 2023, Jenn Johnson led the song on Bethel Music's live album Come Up Here.

== Background ==
On July 15, 2022, Chris Tomlin announced that he would be releasing a new worship project titled Always on September 9, releasing "Holy Forever" as the first promotional single from the album. "Holy Forever" followed the previously released singles "I See You", "Always", and "Yahweh (No One)". Speaking with Christian magazine Worship Leader, Tomlin described the song as "the anchor" of Always.

== Composition ==
"Holy Forever" is composed in the key of D♭ with a tempo of 72 beats per minute, and a musical time signature of 4/4.

== Reception ==
=== Critical response ===
Jonathan Andre in his 365 Days of Inspiring Media review spotlighted the track as one of three songs to listen to on Always, opining that "'Holy Forever' is my favourite song from Chris Tomlin's Always, as this track becomes my favourite Chris Tomlin ballad, ever since 'Jesus' way back in 2016." Timothy Yap of JubileeCast gave a positive review of the album, saying, "Solely focused on God in his glorious splendor surrounded with a soul-stirring chorus, this reminds us of the type of worship mentioned in Revelation 4 and 5." Gerod Bass of Worship Musician magazine wrote a positive review of the song, saying it "touches on the ever faithful theme with its soaring chorus notes and reverent and honest worship."

=== Accolades ===
Awards
| Year | Organization | Award | Result | Ref |
|---|---|---|---|---|
| 2023 | Grammy Awards | Best Contemporary Christian Music Performance/Song | Nominated | |

== Commercial performance ==
"Holy Forever" debuted at No. 43 on the US Hot Christian Songs chart dated July 30, 2022 as a promotional single. After steadily climbing the charts through streaming and digital sales alone, it was officially released to radio in March 2023. The song would reach the Top 10 after 43 weeks. It ascended to the No. 1 position on the chart dated October 7, 2023, completing a record-breaking 59-week climb to the summit, the longest ascent in the chart's history. It spent four weeks at No. 1 and remained on the Hot Christian Songs chart for a total of 80 weeks, making it Tomlin's longest-charting song. In May 2024, it was certified Gold by the Recording Industry Association of America.

== Music videos ==
The official lyric video of "Holy Forever" was published via Chris Tomlin's YouTube channel on July 14, 2022. A live performance of the song, featuring Brian and Jenn Johnson, was released on his channel on April 28, 2023, which was recorded during his seventh Good Friday Nashville concert in Bridgestone Arena.

== Cover versions ==
On October 6, 2023, a cover of "Holy Forever" by American singer CeCe Winans was released on YouTube.

On November 28, 2025, Jason Dunn of Hawk Nelson released a cover of the song.

In 2026, a metal version of the song by Seventh Day Slumber, was released on the album Thy Kingdom Come.

== Track listing ==
"Holy Forever"
| No. | Title | Writer(s) | Producer(s) | Length |
|---|---|---|---|---|
| 1. | "Holy Forever" | Jason Ingram; Brian Johnson; Jenn Johnson; Chris Tomlin; Phil Wickham | Jonathan Smith | 5:08 |
| 2. | "Always" | Daniel Carson; Jess Cates; Ben Glover; Jeff Sojka; Tomlin | Ben Glover; Jeff Sojka | 4:07 |
| 3. | "Yahweh (No One)" (with Elevation Worship) | Chris Brown; Steven Furtick; Ingram; Tomlin | Ben Glover; Jeff Sojka | 4:50 |
| 4. | "I See You" (with Brandon Lake) | Bryan Fowler; Jonas Myrin; Tomlin | Bryan Fowler | 3:50 |
| Total length: | | | | 17:58 |

== Personnel ==
Adapted from AllMusic.

- Jacob Arnold — drums, percussion
- Adam Ayan — mastering engineer
- Jonsal Barrientes — choir/chorus
- Dallan Beck — editing
- Jesse Brock — mixing assistant
- Chris Brown — background vocals, choir/chorus
- Shantay Brown — choir/chorus
- Daniel Carson — acoustic guitar, choir/chorus, electric guitar
- Tamera Chipp — choir/chorus
- Chad Chrisman — A&R
- Courtlan Clement — electric guitar
- Nickie Conley — background vocals
- Elevation Worship — primary artist
- Enaka Enyong — choir/chorus
- Jason Eskridge — background vocals
- Bryan Fowler — acoustic guitar, background vocals, bass, electric guitar, keyboards, producer, programmer, synthesizer programming
- Sam Gibson — mixing
- Ben Glover — acoustic guitar, background vocals, choir/chorus, electric guitar, engineer, keyboards, producer, programming
- Lindsay Glover — choir/chorus
- Tarik Henry — choir/chorus
- Mark Hill — bass
- Tiffany Hudson — choir/chorus
- Tommy Iceland — choir/chorus
- Jenn Johnson — background vocals
- Taylor Johnson — acoustic guitar, electric guitar
- Graham King — engineer
- Benji Kurokose — choir/chorus
- Brandon Lake — primary artist, vocals
- Paul Mabury — drums
- Jerry McPherson — electric guitar
- Matthew Melton — bass
- Buckley Miller — recording
- Sean Moffitt — mixing
- Gordon Mote — piano
- Brad O'Donnell — A&R
- Colton Price — editing, programming
- David Ramirez — programming
- Sophie Shear — choir/chorus
- Jonathan Smith — background vocals, Hammond B3, organ, piano, producer, programming
- Jeff Sojka — background vocals, choir/chorus, drums, electric guitar, engineer, keyboards, producer, programming
- Isaiah Templeton — choir/chorus
- Chris Tomlin — choir/chorus, primary artist, vocals
- Bria Valderama — choir/chorus
- Doug Weier — mixing
- Jordan Welch — choir/chorus

== Charts ==
=== Weekly charts ===
Weekly chart performance for "Holy Forever"
| Chart (2022–2025) | Peak position |
|---|---|
| US Hot Christian Songs (Billboard) | 1 |
| US Christian Airplay (Billboard) | 1 |
| US Christian AC (Billboard) | 1 |
| US Digital Song Sales (Billboard) | 3 |

=== Year-end charts ===
Year-end chart performance for "Holy Forever"
| Chart (2023) | Position |
|---|---|
| US Christian Songs (Billboard) | 4 |
| US Christian Airplay (Billboard) | 9 |
| US Christian AC (Billboard) | 5 |
| Chart (2024) | Position |
| US Christian Songs (Billboard) | 15 |
| Chart (2025) | Position |
| US Christian Digital Song Sales (Billboard) | 16 |
| US Christian Streaming Songs (Billboard) | 11 |

== Certifications ==
| Region | Certification | Certified units/sales |
|---|---|---|
| New Zealand (RMNZ) | Gold | 15,000^{‡} |
| United States (RIAA) | Platinum | 1,000,000^{‡} |
^{‡} Sales+streaming figures based on certification alone.

== Release history ==
Release dates and formats for "Holy Forever"
| Region | Date | Format | Label | Ref. |
|---|---|---|---|---|
| Various | July 15, 2022 | Digital download; streaming; (promotional release) | Sparrow; Capitol CMG | |
| United States | March 10, 2023 | Christian radio | Sparrow; Capitol CMG | |
