= Unlearn =

Unlearn may refer to:

- Unlearn (album), and its title track by Griffen Palmer, 2023
- Unlearn, an album and its title track by the band Psykosonik
- Unlearn, an album by Youngblood Brass Band
- "Unlearn", a song by Reks from his album REBELutionary

== See also ==
- Unlearning, a 2005 album by Matt Brouwer
