= 25 to Life (disambiguation) =

25 to Life is a 2006 video game.

25 to Life may also refer to:

- 25 to Life (album), by Pimp Squad Click
- "25 to Life", a song by Eminem from his album Recovery
- "25 to Life", a song by Griffen Palmer from his album Unlearn
- "25 to Life" (Criminal Minds), a 2010 television episode

== See also ==
- 25 ta Life, an American musical group
- Life imprisonment
