= Country Again =

2021 single by Thomas Rhett

Single by Thomas Rhett

from the album Country Again: Side A
- Released: April 12, 2021
- Genre: Country pop
- Length: 3:41
- Label: Valory
- Songwriters: Thomas Rhett; Ashley Gorley; Zach Crowell
- Producers: Dann Huff; Jesse Frasure

Thomas Rhett singles chronology
"God Who Listens" (2021)	"Country Again" (2021)	"Thank You Lord" (2021)

Music video
- "Country Again" on YouTube

"Country Again" is a song recorded by American country music singer Thomas Rhett for his fifth studio album, Country Again: Side A (2021). The song was written by Rhett, Ashley Gorley, and Zach Crowell, while produced by Jesse Frasure and Dann Huff. It was released by Valory on April 12, 2021, as the second single from the album.

== Background ==
Rhett accepted an interview, and said: “It’s one of my favorite songs I’ve written yet and honestly just feels full circle in so many ways… it’s about the crazy journey I’ve been on over the last decade and ultimately finding my way back home.”

Rhett told Billboard: “‘Country Again’ is not just a song title – it does represent 80-90% of this album. The song is about Rhett sharing quality time with friends and family, and suggests that the past year’s touring shutdowns have given him ample time to slow down and reconnect with loved ones and with himself.

== Music video ==
The music video was released on April 13, 2021. It was directed by TK McKamy, who directed many of Rhett's previous music videos, including "Die a Happy Man", "Marry Me", and "What's Your Country Song". It shows Rhett performing the song with a guitar at an old warehouse.

== Credits and personnel ==
Credits are adapted from the liner notes of Country Again: Side A.

- Stuart Duncan – fiddle
- Paul Franklin – steel guitar
- Jesse Frasure – programming
- Dann Huff – electric guitar, programming
- David Huff – programming
- Charlie Judge – B-3 organ
- Chris Kimmerer – drums
- Justin Niebank – programming
- Josh Reedy – background vocals
- Thomas Rhett – lead vocals
- Jimmie Lee Sloas – bass guitar
- Ilya Toshinsky – acoustic guitar, banjo
- Derek Wells – electric guitar

== Charts ==
=== Weekly charts ===
Weekly chart performance for "Country Again"
Chart (2021)	Peak position
Australia Country Hot 50 (TMN)	23
Canada Hot 100 (Billboard)	42
Canada Country (Billboard)	1
US Billboard Hot 100	42
US Country Airplay (Billboard)	1
US Hot Country Songs (Billboard)	5

=== Year-end charts ===
Year-end chart performance for "Country Again"
Chart (2021)	Position
US Country Airplay (Billboard)	29
US Hot Country Songs (Billboard)	25

== Certifications ==
Region	Certification	Certified units/sales
United States (RIAA)	Platinum	1,000,000^{‡}
^{‡} Sales+streaming figures based on certification alone.
