= 6-Pack (EP) =

EP by Florida Georgia Line
- Released: May 22, 2020
- Genre: Country
- Length: 17:25
- Label: Nashville Harbor
- Producers: Corey Crowder; Tyler Hubbard; Brian Kelley

Florida Georgia Line chronology
Can't Say I Ain't Country (2019)	6-Pack (2020)	Life Rolls On (2021)

Singles from 6-Pack
- 1. "I Love My Country" Released: March 27, 2020

6-Pack is an EP by American country music duo Florida Georgia Line. It was released on May 22, 2020 under Nashville Harbor Records & Entertainment. The EP includes the single "I Love My Country" as well as the track "Second Guessing" from the duo’s appearance on Songland. All six songs from the EP are included on the duo’s fifth studio album Life Rolls On.

== Track listing ==
6-Pack track listing
No.	Title	Writer(s)	Length
1.	"Beer:30"	Brian Kelley; Canaan Smith; Ernest K. Smith; Tyler Hubbard	2:18
2.	"Ain’t Worried Bout It"	Kelley; Hubbard; Ben Hayslip; Corey Crowder; Dallas Davidson	2:32
3.	"Second Guessing"	Kelley; Hubbard; Crowder; Shane McAnally; Andrew DeRoberts; Benjamin Simonetti; Ester Dean; Geoff Warburton; Griffen Palmer; Ryan Tedder	3:06
4.	"Countryside"	Blake Redferrin; Jake Rose; Michael Whitworth	3:21
5.	"U.S. Stronger"	Kelley; Hubbard	3:04
6.	"I Love My Country"	Crowder; Smith; Charlie Handsome; Kane Brown; Chase McGill; Will Weatherly	3:04

== Personnel ==
=== Florida Georgia Line ===
- Tyler Hubbard - vocals
- Brian Kelley - vocals

=== Additional Personnel ===
- Tyler Chiarelli - electric guitar
- Dave Cohen - Hammond B-3 organ, synthesizer
- Corey Crowder - programming, background vocals
- Andrew DeRoberts - electric guitar, programming
- Todd Lombardo - banjo, acoustic guitar, electric guitar, mandolin
- Tony Lucido - bass guitar
- Jerry Roe - drums, percussion
- Jake Rose - banjo, acoustic guitar, programming
- Jimmie Lee Sloas - bass guitar
- Ilya Toshinsky - banjo, acoustic guitar
- Derek Wells - dobro, electric guitar, steel guitar
- Alex Wright - Hammond B-3 organ, keyboards, piano, synthesizer

== Charts ==
=== Weekly charts ===
Chart performance for 6-Pack
Chart (2020)	Peak position
Australian Country Albums (ARIA)	7
Canadian Albums (Billboard)	36
US Billboard 200	50
US Top Country Albums (Billboard)	5

=== Year-end charts ===
Year-end chart performance for 6-Pack
Chart (2020)	Position
US Top Country Albums (Billboard)	62
