= Country Again: Side A =

Studio album by Thomas Rhett
- Released: April 30, 2021
- Studios: Blackbird Studio, Sound Stage Studios and House of Drag (Nashville, Tennessee)
- Genre: Country
- Length: 34:03
- Label: Valory
- Producers: Dann Huff; Jesse Frasure; Matt Dragstrem

Thomas Rhett chronology
Center Point Road (2019)	Country Again: Side A (2021)	Where We Started (2022)

Singles from Country Again: Side A
- 1. "What's Your Country Song" Released: November 11, 2020; 2. "Country Again" Released: April 12, 2021

Country Again: Side A is the fifth studio album by American country music artist Thomas Rhett, and the first release of the Country Again double album project. It includes the singles "What's Your Country Song" and the project's title track. The album was released on April 30, 2021, through the Valory Music Co., with its follow-up Country Again: Side B intended for release in late 2022, which did not materalize.

== Background ==
Rhett co-wrote every song on the album. Most of the writing and work on the album was done during the COVID-19 pandemic, and Rhett called it the "best work [he's] ever done". He stated that he felt more inspiration from traditional country music in the process of making this album, noted musical influence from Eric Church, and remarked that he wanted to "tell a real, honest story from the heart". He said that with this album, he "was just trying to be a songwriter".

== Commercial performance ==
In the United States, Country Again: Side A debuted at No. 10 on the Billboard 200 with 30,000 equivalent album units (14,000 in album sales), becoming his fifth top 10 entry on the chart.

== Track listing ==
Country Again: Side A track listing
No.	Title	Writer(s)	Length
1.	"Want It Again"	Thomas Rhett; Jon Henderson; Lynn Hutton; Matt Dragstrem; Josh Miller; Josh Thompson	2:52
2.	"Growing Up"	Rhett; Dragstrem; Miller; Thompson	3:01
3.	"What's Your Country Song"	Rhett; Rhett Akins; Jesse Frasure; Ashley Gorley; Parker Welling	2:51
4.	"Where We Grew Up"	Rhett; Miller; Luke Laird	2:45
5.	"Heaven Right Now"	Rhett; Akins; Dragstrem; Thompson; Laura Veltz	3:48
6.	"To the Guys That Date My Girls"	Rhett; Akins; Thompson; Will Bundy	3:01
7.	"More Time Fishin'"	Rhett; Akins; Thompson; Bundy	3:05
8.	"Country Again"	Rhett; Gorley; Zach Crowell	3:41
9.	"Put It on Ice" (featuring Hardy)	Rhett; Akins; Dragstrem; Thompson	3:04
10.	"Blame It on a Backroad"	Rhett; Crowell; Gorley	2:47
11.	"Ya Heard"	Rhett; Akins; Dragstrem; Chase McGill	3:03
Total length:			34:03

== Personnel ==
- Thomas Rhett – lead vocals, backing vocals (1–4, 9), whistle (7)
- Charlie Judge – keyboards (1, 3–5, 9–11), Hammond B3 organ (2, 6–8, 10), acoustic piano (3), cello (5)
- Justin Niebank – programming
- Jesse Frasure – programming (1–3, 5–8, 10, 11), acoustic guitar (3), synth bass (3)
- Luke Laird – programming (4)
- Josh Miller – programming (4)
- David Huff – programming (6)
- Matt Dragstrem – programming (9, 11), synth bass (9), backing vocals (9), acoustic guitar (11)
- Ilya Toshinsky – acoustic guitar (1, 2, 4–9), mandolin (2, 4, 9), gut string guitar (6), 12-string acoustic guitar (7), banjo (8–10), electric guitar (9), dobro (9), resonator guitar (9)
- Derek Wells – electric guitars (1, 5, 11)
- Dann Huff – electric guitars (2–4, 6–8, 10), electric guitar solo (2, 3), ganjo (3), slide guitar solo (6), synth bass (6, 7), programming (7, 8), acoustic guitar (10)
- Patrick Droney – electric guitars (9), electric guitar solo (9)
- Tyler Chiarelli – dobro (3)
- Stuart Duncan – fiddle (7, 8, 10), mandolin (7)
- Paul Franklin – steel guitar (1–3, 6–10)
- Jimmie Lee Sloas – bass guitar
- Chris Kimmerer – drums, percussion (2, 9–11), programming (6)
- Kirk "Jelly Roll" Johnson – harmonica (11)
- Josh Reedy – backing vocals
- Hardy – lead and backing vocals (9)

Production

- Dann Huff – producer
- Jesse Frasure – producer (1–3, 5–8, 10, 11)
- Matt Dragstrem – producer (9), additional recording (9)
- Joe Baldridge – recording
- Kam Lucherthand – recording assistant (1, 3, 6–8)
- Josh Ditty – recording assistant (2, 4, 5, 9–11)
- Drew Bollman – additional recording (9)
- David Huff – digital editing (1–8, 10, 11)
- Chris Small – digital editing (1–8, 10, 11)
- Brian David Willis – digital editing (2)
- Sam Cooke – digital editing (9)
- Justin Niebank – mixing at Blackbird Studio (Nashville, Tennessee) and Hound's Ear Studio (Franklin, Tennessee)
- Adam Ayan – mastering at Gateway Mastering (Portland, Maine)
- Mike "Frog" Griffith – production coordinator
- Doug Rich – copy coordinator
- Janice Soled – copy coordinator
- Sandi Spika Borchetta – art direction
- Justin Ford – art direction, graphic design
- Thomas Rhett – art direction, additional photography
- John Shearer – cover photography, additional photography
- Grayson Gregory – additional photography
- Ali Ryan – grooming
- Amanda Valentine – stylist

== Charts ==
=== Weekly charts ===
Chart performance for Country Again: Side A
Chart (2021)	Peak position
Australian Albums (ARIA)	65
Australian Country Albums (ARIA)	5
Canadian Albums (Billboard)	13
Scottish Albums (Official Charts)	41
UK Country Albums (Official Charts)	2
US Billboard 200	10
US Top Country Albums (Billboard)	2

=== Year-end charts ===
Year-end chart performance for Country Again: Side A
Chart (2021)	Position
US Top Country Albums (Billboard)	40

== Certifications ==
Certifications for Country Again: Side A
Region	Certification	Certified units/sales
Canada (Music Canada)	Gold	40,000^{‡}
^{‡} Sales+streaming figures based on certification alone.

== Release history ==
Release formats for Country Again: Side A
Country	Date	Format	Label	Ref.
Various	April 30, 2021	Compact disc; digital download; streaming	Valory Music Co.	
