= Who You Are to Me =

2020 song by Chris Tomlin

Single by Chris Tomlin featuring Lady A

from the album Chris Tomlin & Friends
- Released: July 10, 2020
- Recorded: 2020
- Genre: CCM; worship; Christian country
- Length: 3:50
- Label: Sparrow; Capitol CMG
- Songwriters: Charles Kelley; Chris Tomlin; Dave Haywood; Hillary Scott
- Producers: Brian Kelley; Chris Tomlin; Corey Crowder; Dave Haywood; Tyler Hubbard

Chris Tomlin singles chronology
"Be a Light" (2020)	"Who You Are to Me" (2020)	"God Who Listens" (2020)

Lady A singles chronology
"Champagne Night" (2021)	"Who You Are to Me" (2021)	"Like a Lady" (2021)

Music video
- "Who You Are to Me" (Lyrics) on YouTube

"Who You Are to Me" is a song by American contemporary Christian musician Chris Tomlin featuring American country music group Lady A. The song was released as the lead single from his thirteenth studio album, Chris Tomlin & Friends (2020), to Christian radio in the United States on July 10, 2020. Tomlin co-wrote the song with Charles Kelley, Dave Haywood, and Hillary Scott. The single was produced by Brian Kelley, Chris Tomlin, Corey Crowder, Dave Haywood, and Tyler Hubbard.

"Who You Are to Me" peaked at No. 2 on the US Hot Christian Songs chart, and No. 30 on the Hot Country Songs chart.

== Background ==
On June 26, 2020, Chris Tomlin released "Who You Are to Me" featuring Lady A alongside "Thank You Lord" featuring Thomas Rhett and Florida Georgia Line, as the first two promotional singles from Chris Tomlin & Friends in the lead-up to its release, slated for July 31, 2020. On July 10, 2020, "Who You Are to Me" impacted Christian radio in the United States as the lead single from the album.

== Composition ==
"Who You Are to Me" is composed in the key of C♯ with a tempo of 96 beats per minute, and a musical time signature of 4/4.

== Commercial performance ==
"Who You Are to Me" debuted at No. 35 on the US Hot Christian Songs chart dated July 11, 2020, concurrently charting at No. 5 on the Christian Digital Song Sales chart. The song peaked at No. 2 and spent a total of thirty one weeks appearing on the chart.

"Who You Are to Me" debuted at No. 21 on the US Christian Airplay chart dated July 18, 2020. The song peaked at No. 1 on the Christian Airplay, becoming Chris Tomlin's tenth No. 1 entry and Lady A's first No. 1 entry on the chart.

== Music video ==
The lyric video of "Who You Are to Me" was published via Chris Tomlin's YouTube channel on June 26, 2020.

== Personnel ==
Adapted from Tidal.

- Adam Ayan — mastering
- David Cook — mixing assistant
- Corey Crowder — producer
- Dave Haywood — producer
- Tyler Hubbard — producer
- Jeff Juliano — mixing
- Brian Kelley — producer
- Lady A — featured artist
- Chris Tomlin — primary artist, producer

== Charts ==
=== Weekly charts ===
Weekly chart performance for "Who You Are to Me"
Chart (2020–2021)	Peak position
US Hot Christian Songs (Billboard)	2
US Christian Airplay (Billboard)	1
US Christian AC (Billboard)	1
US Hot Country Songs (Billboard)	30

=== Year-end charts ===
Year-end chart performance for "Who You Are to Me"
Chart (2020)	Position
US Christian Songs (Billboard)	22
US Christian Airplay (Billboard)	21
US Christian AC (Billboard)	29
US Hot Country Songs (Billboard)	94
US (WAY-FM)	11
Chart (2021)	Position
US Christian Songs (Billboard)	56
US Christian Airplay (Billboard)	37

== Certifications ==
Region	Certification	Certified units/sales
United States (RIAA)	Gold	500,000^{‡}
^{‡} Sales+streaming figures based on certification alone.

== Release history ==
Region	Date	Format	Label	Ref.
Various	June 26, 2020	Digital download (promotional release); streaming (promotional release)	Sparrow Records; Capitol Christian Music Group	
United States	July 10, 2020	Christian radio	Sparrow Records; Capitol Christian Music Group	
