= Always (Chris Tomlin song) =

2022 song by Chris Tomlin

Single by Chris Tomlin

from the album Always
- Released: March 29, 2022
- Recorded: 2021
- Genre: Worship; CCM
- Length: 4:07
- Label: Sparrow; Capitol CMG
- Songwriters: Daniel Carson; Jess Cates; Ben Glover; Jeff Sojka; Chris Tomlin
- Producers: Ben Glover; Jeff Sojka

Chris Tomlin singles chronology
"Emmanuel God With Us" (2021)	"Always" / "Yahweh (No One)" (2022)	"Holy Forever" (2023)

Music video
- "Always" (Acoustic) on YouTube
- "Always" (Live) on YouTube
- "Always" (Lyrics) on YouTube

"Always" is a song by American contemporary Christian musicians Chris Tomlin. It was released on March 29, 2022, as the lead single from Tomlin's fourteenth studio album, Always (2022). Tomlin co-wrote the song with Ben Glover, Daniel Carson, Jeff Sojka, and Jess Cates. Ben Glover and Jeff Sojka handled the production of the single.

"Always" peaked at No. 6 on the US Hot Christian Songs chart published by Billboard.

== Background ==
On March 29, 2022, Chris Tomlin released a two-track single titled Always, containing the title track and "Yahweh (No One)" with Elevation Worship, accompanied with their lyric videos.

== Composition ==
"Always" is composed in the key of C with a tempo of 79 beats per minute, and a musical time signature of 4/4.

== Commercial performance ==
"Always" debuted at No. 34 on the US Hot Christian Songs chart dated April 16, 2022. It went on to peak at No. 6 on the Hot Christian Songs chart.

"Always" debuted at No. 45 on the US Christian Airplay chart dated April 30, 2022. It went on to reach No. 5 on the Christian Airplay chart.

== Music videos ==
The official lyric video of "Always" was published via Chris Tomlin's YouTube channel on March 29, 2022. On April 12, 2022, Tomlin released the acoustiv performance video of the song through YouTube. The live performance video of "Always" filmed at Good Friday Nashville, was issued on April 22, 2022.

== Track listing ==
"Always"
No.	Title	Writer(s)	Length
1.	"Always"	Daniel Carson; Jess Cates; Ben Glover; Jeff Sojka; Chris Tomlin	4:07
2.	"Yahweh (No One)" (with Elevation Worship)	Chris Brown; Steven Furtick; Jason Ingram; Tomlin	4:50
Total length:			8:58

== Personnel ==
Adapted from AllMusic.

- Adam Ayan — mastering engineer
- Jonsal Barrientes — choir/chorus
- Dallan Beck — editing
- Chris Brown — background vocals, choir/chorus
- Shantay Brown — choir/chorus
- Daniel Carson — acoustic guitar, choir/chorus, electric guitar
- Tamera Chipp — choir/chorus
- Chad Chrisman — A&R
- Elevation Worship — primary artist
- Enaka Enyong — choir/chorus
- Sam Gibson — mixing
- Ben Glover — acoustic guitar, background vocals, choir/chorus, electric guitar, engineer, keyboards, producer, programming
- Lindsay Glover — choir/chorus
- Tarik Henry — choir/chorus
- Mark Hill — bass
- Tiffany Hudson — choir/chorus
- Tommy Iceland — choir/chorus
- Graham King — engineer
- Benji Kurokose — choir/chorus
- Jerry McPherson — electric guitar
- Gordon Mote — piano
- Brad O'Donnell — A&R
- Sophie Shear — choir/chorus
- Jeff Sojka — background vocals, choir/chorus, drums, electric guitar, engineer, keyboards, producer, programming
- Isaiah Templeton — choir/chorus
- Chris Tomlin — choir/chorus, primary artist
- Bria Valderrama — choir/chorus
- Doug Weier — mixing
- Jordan Welch — choir/chorus

== Charts ==
=== Weekly charts ===
Weekly chart performance for "Always"
Chart (2022)	Peak position
US Hot Christian Songs (Billboard)	6
US Christian Airplay (Billboard)	5
US Christian AC (Billboard)	7

=== Year-end charts ===
Year-end chart performance for "Always"
Chart (2022)	Position
US Christian Songs (Billboard)	29
US Christian Airplay (Billboard)	26
US Christian AC (Billboard)	23

== Release history ==
Release history and formats for "Always"
Region	Date	Format	Label	Ref.
Various	March 29, 2022	Digital download; streaming	Sparrow Records; Capitol Christian Music Group	
