= God Who Listens =

2021 single by Chris Tomlin

Single by Chris Tomlin featuring Thomas Rhett

from the album Chris Tomlin & Friends
- Released: February 5, 2021
- Recorded: 2020
- Genre: CCM; worship; Christian country
- Length: 4:09 (album version); 3:03 (radio version)
- Label: Sparrow; Capitol CMG
- Songwriters: Ashley Gorley; Chris Tomlin; David Garcia; Thomas Rhett
- Producer: David Garcia

Chris Tomlin singles chronology
"Who You Are to Me" (2020)	"God Who Listens" (2021)	"I See You" (2021)

Thomas Rhett singles chronology
"What's Your Country Song" (2020)	"God Who Listens" (2021)	"Country Again" (2021)

Music video
- "God Who Listens" (Lyrics) on YouTube

"God Who Listens" is a song by American contemporary Christian musician Chris Tomlin featuring American country music singer-songwriter Thomas Rhett. The song was released as the second single from his thirteenth studio album, Chris Tomlin & Friends (2020), on February 5, 2021. Tomlin co-wrote the song with Ashley Gorley, David Garcia, and Thomas Rhett. The single was produced by David Garcia.

== Background ==
"God Who Listens" was released by Chris Tomlin on February 5, 2021, as the second single from Chris Tomlin & Friends (2020), following the lead single "Who You Are to Me." Chris Tomlin shared the message behind the song, saying: "This song is centered around what sets God apart from all the other idols and gods in the world—He listens. Not sometimes, but always. You know, sometimes He is listening and moving in our lives, and we have no idea, and sometimes He is listening and moving, and it is so apparent."

== Composition ==
"God Who Listens" is composed in the key of A with a tempo of 105 beats per minute, and a musical time signature of 4/4.

== Commercial performance ==
"God Who Listens" debuted at No. 43 on the US Hot Christian Songs chart dated August 15, 2020, concurrently charting at No. 13 on the Christian Digital Song Sales chart. The song peaked at No. 13 on Hot Christian Songs chart and spent a total of twenty six non-consecutive weeks appearing on the chart.

== Music video ==
The lyric video of "God Who Listens" was published via Chris Tomlin's YouTube channel on June 26, 2020.

== Personnel ==
Adapted from AllMusic.

- Adam Ayan — mastering
- David Garcia — mixing, producer
- Thomas Rhett — featured artist, vocals
- Chris Tomlin — primary artist

== Charts ==
=== Weekly charts ===
Weekly chart performance for "God Who Listens"
Chart (2020–2021)	Peak position
US Hot Christian Songs (Billboard)	13
US Christian Airplay (Billboard)	17
US Christian AC (Billboard)	13

=== Year-end charts ===
Year-end chart performance for "God Who Listens"
Chart (2021)	Position
US Christian Songs (Billboard)	43
US Christian Airplay (Billboard)	34
US Christian AC (Billboard)	33

== Release history ==
Region	Date	Format	Label	Ref.
Various	February 5, 2021	Digital download; streaming	Sparrow Records; Capitol Christian Music Group	
United States	February 5, 2021	Christian radio	Sparrow Records; Capitol Christian Music Group	
