= Always (Chris Tomlin album) =

2022 studio album by Chris Tomlin

Studio album by Chris Tomlin
- Released: September 9, 2022
- Recorded: 2021–2022
- Genre: Worship
- Length: 53:22
- Label: Sparrow; Capitol CMG
- Producer: Ben Glover; Jeff Sojka; Ed Cash; Jonathan Smith; Dave Haywood; Ben West; Bryan Fowler

Chris Tomlin chronology
Emmanuel: Christmas Songs of Worship (2021)	Always (2022)	The King Is Still the King (2025)

Singles from Always
- 1. "I See You" Released: August 6, 2021; 2. "Always" / "Yahweh (No One)" Released: March 29, 2022; 3. "Holy Forever" Released: March 10, 2023

Always is the thirteenth solo studio album by American contemporary Christian singer Chris Tomlin. It was released on September 9, 2022, through Sparrow Records and Capitol CMG. The album features guest appearances by Elevation Worship, Steffany Gretzinger, and Brandon Lake. The album was produced by Ben Glover, Jeff Sojka, Ed Cash, Jonathan Smith, Dave Haywood, Ben West, and Bryan Fowler.

The album was supported by the release of "I See You," "Always," "Yahweh (No One)" and "Holy Forever" as singles. "I See You" peaked at No. 31 on the US Hot Christian Songs chart. The title track peaked at No. 6 on the Hot Christian Songs chart. "Yahweh (No One)" peaked at No. 46 on the US Christian Airplay chart. "Holy Forever" peaked at No. 3 on the Hot Christian Songs chart. "O Lord, You're Beautiful" was released as promotional singles. The song "The Answer" was accompanied by the background vocal of Lady A. The album was being promoted with the Tomlin United Tour and the Stories of Worship Tour, spanning cities across the United States.

Always drew mixed reactions from critics, though it was a commercially successful album upon its release, debuting at No. 2 on Billboard's Top Christian Albums Chart in the United States, and at No. 11 on the Official Charts' Official Christian & Gospel Albums Chart in the United Kingdom. The album received a nomination for the Grammy Award for Best Contemporary Christian Music Album at the 2023 Grammy Awards, while the song "Holy Forever" was nominated for Best Contemporary Christian Music Performance/Song.

== Background ==
On July 15, 2022, Chris Tomlin announced that he will be releasing a new worship project titled Always, revealing the album cover, track listing and artists featured on the album. The album marks the follow-up to Tomlin's previous release, Chris Tomlin & Friends (2021), and the companion EP, Chris Tomlin & Friends: Summer EP (2021). The album contains 13 tracks, with twelve being co-written by Tomlin, with Elevation Worship, Steffany Gretzinger, and Brandon Lake featuring as guests. Tomlin shared the purpose of the album in an interview with Forbes, saying, "This record is back to the center, the heart of what this is all about for me – really helping people connect to God and worship God."

The quality time that Tomlin spent with his family inspired some songs on the album, from working on previously written material, covering classics and recording new material. The inspiration for the album emerging when Tomlin rediscovered "Oh Lord, You're Beautiful" by Keith Green, which was one of his favorite songs growing up. During the COVID pandemic, Tomlin taught the song to his daughters, singing it regularly during home church on Sundays and realizing that he wanted to record it.

== Release and promotion ==
=== Singles ===
On August 6, 2021, Chris Tomlin released "I See You" with Brandon Lake as the lead single from the album, accompanied with the song's lyric video. The song peaked at No. 31 on the US Hot Christian Songs chart.

On March 29, 2022, Tomlin released a two-track single titled Always, containing the title track and "Yahweh (No One)" with Elevation Worship, accompanied with their lyric videos. "Always" peaked at No. 6 on the Hot Christian Songs chart. "Yahweh (No One)" peaked at No. 46 on the US Christian Airplay chart.

"Holy Forever" impact Christian radio in the United States on March 10, 2023, as the fourth single from the album. "Holy Forever" peaked at No. 3 on the Hot Christian Songs chart. It was nominated for the Grammy Award for Best Contemporary Christian Music Performance/Song at the 2023 Grammy Awards.

=== Promotional singles ===
On July 15, 2022, Chris Tomlin released "Holy Forever" as the first promotional single from the album, accompanied with its lyric video.

On August 12, 2022, Chris Tomlin released "O Lord, You're Beautiful" as the second and final promotional single from the album, accompanied with its lyric video.

=== Performances ===
On October 10, 2022, Chris Tomlin performed "Holy Forever" on The Kelly Clarkson Show.

== Touring ==
On October 15, 2021, Premier Productions announced that Chris Tomlin and Hillsong United will embark on a co-headline tour dubbed the Tomlin United Tour, slated to commence at the Greensboro Coliseum in Greensboro, North Carolina, on February 9, 2022, concluding at the Gas South Arena in Duluth, Georgia. On February 9, 2022, Premier Productions and The Tomlin United Tour announced that the tour will be postponed, beginning on March 29 at Pechanga Arena in San Diego, California, and ending on June 17 at the Van Andel Arena in Grand Rapids, Michigan. The tour was a success, having ranked in Pollstar's Top 10 Worldwide Tours list during its run.

In November 2022, Chris Tomlin announced the Stories of Worship Tour slated to commence on February 23, 2023, in San Antonio, Texas, and concluding on April 23, 2023, in Grand Rapids, Michigan.

== Reception ==
=== Critical response ===
Professional ratings
Review scores
Source	Rating
365 Days of Inspiring Media	3/5
JubileeCast	5/5
Today's Christian Entertainment	3.8/5 stars

Jonathan Andre in his 365 Days of Inspiring Media review opined that "Chris will always be polarising. They'll be people who love his music, and then they'll be people who'll think he's 'basic'. I fall in the middle, some albums I absolutely love, and then there's others, where I appreciate the album from an objective standpoint, but I myself can't connect to it as much as others," with his opinion on most of the songs on the album being the latter. Timothy Yap of JubileeCast gave a glowing review of the album, saying, "Chris Tomlin has returned to what's he done best: writing and singing powerful worship anthems for the church. After a detour into a country-pop duet album which finds him falling into too many crevices, Always is a return to form. If you like Tomlin for his powerhouse singalongs such as "Whom Shall I Fear (God of Angel Armies)," "Our God," and "Good Good Father," you'll love what he has to offer here." In a NewReleaseToday review, Jasmin Patterson spoke of the album, saying "What I love about Chris Tomlin is that he's consistent. When you listen to a Chris Tomlin album, you know what you're going to get: songs that are accessible for anyone to play and sing along with pure worship, and the truth of who God is. True to Chris' mission in ministry, Always will point your heart to God in adoration." Celita Diaz-Perillo, indicated in a three-point-eight star review at Today's Christian Entertainment: "Always has a mixture of new tunes, and classic songs with some creative changes. Some of them call the soul to ardent, active faith. Some are gentle reminders of who we are in Christ. All are intended to spur the believing soul to persevere and hold on and look up to the Helper and Lover of our souls." Gerod Bass of Worship Musician magazine wrote a positive review of the album, saying "This is the best Tomlin album since Never Lose Sight with almost every song sure to be a Sunday morning classic. Seriously, there is not a bad song or one I would consider a "filler" here. The church is better with this version of Chris Tomlin and I for one am thankful to have him back doing what he does best."

=== Accolades ===
Awards
Year	Organization	Award	Result	Ref
2023	Grammy Awards	Best Contemporary Christian Music Album	Lost	

== Commercial performance ==
In the United States, Always debuted at No. 2 on the Top Christian Albums chart in the United States dated September 24, 2022. Always launched at No. 11 on the OCC's Official Christian & Gospel Albums Chart in the United Kingdom, in the week ending September 22, 2022.

== Track listing ==
Always
No.	Title	Writer(s)	Producer(s)	Length
1.	"Yahweh (No One)" (with Elevation Worship)	Chris Brown; Steven Furtick; Jason Ingram; Chris Tomlin	Ben Glover; Jeff Sojka	4:51
2.	"Always"	Daniel Carson; Jess Cates; Ben Glover; Jeff Sojka; Tomlin	Ben Glover; Jeff Sojka	4:09
3.	"Strongholds"	Ed Cash; Louie Giglio; Chris Tomlin	Ed Cash	4:01
4.	"Holy Forever"	Ingram; Brian Johnson; Jenn Johnson; Tomlin; Phil Wickham	Jonathan Smith	5:08
5.	"O Lord, You're Beautiful" (with Steffany Gretzinger)	Keith Green	Ben Glover; Jeff Sojka	3:56
6.	"The Answer"	Dave Haywood; Josh Kear; Charles Kelley; Tomlin; Benjamin West	Dave Haywood; Ben West	3:35
7.	"Great Forgiver"	Glover; Bear Rinehart; Sojka; Tomlin	Ben Glover; Jeff Sojka	3:18
8.	"I Believe in Jesus"	Ben Fielding; Tomlin; Mitch Wong	Ben Glover; Jeff Sojka	4:00
9.	"I See You" (with Brandon Lake)	Bryan Fowler; Jonas Myrin; Tomlin	Bryan Fowler	3:51
10.	"Father of Lights"	Furtick; Glover; Ingram; Sojka; Tomlin	Ben Glover; Jeff Sojka	4:32
11.	"History"	Cody Carnes; Cates; Chris Tomlin	Ben Glover; Jeff Sojka	3:19
12.	"All in All"	Corey Crowder; Tyler Hubbard; Ingram; Tomlin	Ben Glover; Jeff Sojka	3:47
13.	"Precious Love"	Ben Cantelon; Sam McCabe; Tomlin	Jonathan Smith	4:55
Total length:				53:22

== Personnel ==
Adapted from AllMusic.

- David Angell — strings
- Monisa Angell — strings
- Jacob Arnold — drums, percussion
- Adam Ayan — mastering engineer
- Carrie Bailey — strings
- Jonsal Barrientes — choir/chorus
- Kevin Bates — cello
- Dallan Beck — editing
- Jenny Bifano — strings
- Jesse Brock — mixing assistant
- Chris Brown — background vocals, choir/chorus
- Luke Brown — background vocals
- Shantay Brown — choir/chorus
- Daniel Carson — acoustic guitar, choir/chorus, electric guitar, recording
- Ed Cash — acoustic guitar, electric guitar, keyboards, producer, programming
- Tamera Chipp — choir/chorus
- Chad Chrisman — A&R
- Court Clement — 12 string acoustic guitar, acoustic guitar, electric guitar, mandolin
- Nickie Conley — background vocals, choir/chorus
- Janet Darnall — strings
- David Davidson — strings
- Elevation Worship — primary artist
- Enaka Enyong — choir/chorus
- Jason Eskridge — background vocals, choir/chorus
- Bryan Fowler — acoustic guitar, background vocals, bass, electric guitar, keyboards, producer, programmer, synthesizer programming
- Devonne Fowlkes — choir/chorus
- Sam Gibson — mixing
- Ben Glover — acoustic guitar, background vocals, bass, choir/chorus, electric guitar, engineer, guitar, keyboards, mixing, producer, programming, recording
- Lindsay Glover — choir/chorus
- Steffany Gretzinger — primary artist
- Dave Haywood — acoustic guitar, background vocals, bouzouki, electric guitar, keyboards, percussion, producer, strings, vocal engineer
- Tarik Henry — choir/chorus
- Mark Hill — bass
- Tiffany Hudson — choir/chorus
- Tommy Iceland — choir/chorus
- Jenn Johnson — background vocals
- Taylor Johnson — acoustic guitar, electric guitar
- Charles Kelley — background vocals
- Daewoo Kim — recording
- Graham King — engineer, recording
- Benji Kuriakose — choir/chorus
- Benji Kurokose — choir/chorus
- Brandon Lake — primary artist, vocals
- Jacob Lowery — bass
- Brett Mabury — arranger
- Paul Mabury — drums
- Jerry McPherson — electric guitar, guitar
- Matthew Melton — bass
- Wil Merrell — choir/chorus
- Buckley Miller — recording
- Sean Moffitt — mixing
- Gordon Mote — piano
- Craig Nelson — strings
- Emily Nelson — strings
- Paul Nelson — strings
- Brad O'Donnell — A&R
- Kiley Phillips — choir/chorus
- Randy Poole — recording
- Colton Price — editing, programming
- David Ramirez — programming
- Hillary Scott — background vocals
- Sophie Shear — choir/chorus
- Jonathan Smith — background vocals, Hammond B3, organ, piano, producer, programming
- Jeff Sojka — background vocals, choir/chorus, drums, electric guitar, engineer, keyboards, producer, programming, recording
- Aaron Sterling — drums, percussion
- Isaiah Templeton — choir/chorus
- Chris Tomlin — choir/chorus, primary artist, vocals
- Bria Valderrama — choir/chorus
- Doug Weier — mixing
- Jordan Welch — choir/chorus
- Ben West — acoustic guitar, bass, drum programming, electric guitar, keyboards, producer
- Kris Wilkinson — strings
- Joe Williams — programming
- Karen Winkelmann — strings

== Charts ==
=== Weekly charts ===
Weekly chart performance for Always
Chart (2022)	Peak position
UK Christian & Gospel Albums (OCC)	11
US Christian Albums (Billboard)	2
US Top Album Sales (Billboard)	23

=== Year-end charts ===
Year-end chart performance for Always
Chart (2023)	Position
US Christian Albums (Billboard)	45
Chart (2025)	Position
US Christian Albums (Billboard)	36

== Release history ==
Release history and formats for Always
Region	Date	Format(s)	Label(s)	Ref.
Various	September 9, 2022	CD; Digital download; streaming	Sparrow Records; Capitol Christian Music Group	
