= Dig Your Roots =

Studio album by Florida Georgia Line
- Released: August 26, 2016
- Recorded: 2015–2016
- Studios: Big Loud Mountain Studio, Nashville, Tennessee; The Threehouse, North Hollywood, Los Angeles; Hubbard Hills; NightBird Recording Studios, West Hollywood, California
- Genre: Country
- Length: 50:10
- Labels: Big Machine; Big Loud Mountain
- Producer: Joey Moi

Florida Georgia Line chronology
Anything Goes (2014)	Dig Your Roots (2016)	Can't Say I Ain't Country (2019)

Singles from Dig Your Roots
- 1. "H.O.L.Y." Released: April 29, 2016; 2. "May We All" Released: July 15, 2016; 3. "God, Your Mama, and Me" Released: January 23, 2017; 4. "Smooth" Released: August 13, 2017

Dig Your Roots is the third studio album by American country music duo Florida Georgia Line. The album was released on August 26, 2016, by Big Machine and Big Loud Mountain. As with their first two albums, it is produced by Joey Moi. The two performers were originally known for their upbeat and cross mix of genres within their music, but they claimed this album was their "calm down" album. They claimed they are looking to do more than just entertain with this album but to get people to dig deep into what really is important in their lives.

== Singles ==
The album's lead single "H.O.L.Y.", was released on April 29, 2016, and became a huge commercial success, topping the Hot Country Songs chart for eighteen consecutive weeks, and also reached number one on the Country Airplay chart. It also peaked at number 14 on the Billboard Hot 100 chart.

"May We All", a duet with Tim McGraw, is the album's second single, and was released on July 15, 2016. It reached number one on the Country Airplay chart, and number two on Hot Country Songs. It also peaked at number 30 on the Hot 100 chart.

"God, Your Mama, and Me", a duet with the Backstreet Boys, is the album's third single, and was released on January 23, 2017. It peaked at number one on the Country Airplay chart. It also peaked at number 46 on the Hot 100.

"Smooth" was the album's fourth and final single, and was released on August 13, 2017. Although it peaked at number 89 on the Hot 100, it failed to reach the top 10 on either Country chart.

== Critical reception ==
Professional ratings
Review scores
Source	Rating
AllMusic	3.5/5 stars

Billy Dukes, writing for Taste of Country, juxtaposed the album to the band's first two albums, praising the diversity of the songs. He wrote that "The evolution of Florida Georgia Line is fascinating. Had they tried to repeat the formula that made them headliners, they wouldn't have made it to album three. Kelley and Hubbard deserve credit for staying one step ahead of their fans and expectations. Annie Reuter of Sounds Like Nashville also reviewed the album favorably, similarly praising the album's diversity, as well as the more mature themes, writing that "Florida Georgia Line showcase their maturity throughout Dig Your Roots but they never waver from what fans know and love about them. The party anthems and beach hangs remain, but so does their respect for their wives and their hopes to continue building a strong family. On Dig Your Roots, Hubbard and Kelley maintain the fun but also show a surprising depth that is more than welcomed."

== Commercial performance ==
Dig Your Roots debuted at number two on the US Billboard 200 chart with 145,000 units, of which 126,000 were pure album sales in its first week of release. In its second week, the album fell to number five on the Billboard 200 chart while moving an additional 42,000 units. The album has sold 444,300 copies as of February 2018. On August 7, 2017, the album was certified platinum by the Recording Industry Association of America (RIAA) for combined sales and album-equivalent units of over a million units in the United States.

In Australia, the album debuted at number seven, becoming Florida Georgia Line's first top ten album in the country.

== Track listing ==
No.	Title	Writer(s)	Length
1.	"Smooth"	Tyler Hubbard; Brian Kelley; Nicolle Galyon; Jordan Schmidt	2:49
2.	"Dig Your Roots"	Hubbard; Kelley; Jerry Flowers; Brett James; Ernest Keith Smith; Will Weatherly	3:35
3.	"Life Is a Honeymoon" (featuring Ziggy Marley)	Hubbard; Kelley; Cary Barlowe; David Marley; Jordan Schmidt	3:05
4.	"H.O.L.Y."	busbee; Nate Cyphert; William Wiik Larsen	3:14
5.	"Island"	Ryan Hurd; Matt McGinn; Schmidt	2:41
6.	"May We All" (featuring Tim McGraw)	Rodney Clawson; Jamie Moore	3:46
7.	"Summerland"	Hubbard; Kelley; Jesse Frasure; Chris Tompkins	2:59
8.	"Lifer"	Hubbard; Kelley; Schmidt	4:27
9.	"Good Girl, Bad Boy"	Clawson; Zach Crowell; Matt Jenkins	3:52
10.	"Wish You Were on It"	Smith Ahnquist; Hunter Phelps; Jameson Rodgers; Will Weatherly	3:06
11.	"God, Your Mama, and Me" (featuring Backstreet Boys)	Josh Kear; Hillary Lindsey; Gordie Sampson	3:04
12.	"Music Is Healing"	Hubbard; Kelley; Schmidt; Craig Wiseman	3:33
13.	"While He's Still Around"	Hubbard; Kelley; Chase Rice; Jesse Rice; Schmidt; Wiseman	2:55
14.	"Grow Old"	Zachary Kale; Canaan Smith	3:52
15.	"Heatwave"	Hubbard; Kelley; Kyle Fishman; Schmidt; Brad Warren; Brett Warren	3:12

== Personnel ==
Performers and musicians

- Brian Kelley – lead vocals, background vocals (1–12, 14–15)
- Tyler Hubbard – lead vocals, background vocals (1–10, 12–15)
- Ziggy Marley – featured artist (3), background vocals (3)
- Tim McGraw – featured artist (6)
- Backstreet Boys – featured artists (11), background vocals (11)
- Big Loud Choir – background vocals (3)
- Sarah Buxton – background vocals (3)
- Dave Cohen – keyboards (5, 7–8, 11)
- Charlie Judge – keyboards (1–5, 7–10, 12, 14–15)
- Jimmie Lee Sloas – bass guitars
- Joey Moi – background vocals (1, 3–7, 10), percussion (1–12, 14–15), electric guitars (12)
- Jamie Moore – keyboards (6)
- Russ Pahl – pedal steel guitar (2, 4–5, 8–9, 11, 13–14)
- Ilya Toshinsky – acoustic guitars, electric guitars (1–3, 5–15), dobro (1, 7, 13), mandolin (1–2, 6, 13), banjo (5, 8, 10, 15)
- Nir Z – drums (13), percussion (13)

Production

- Scott Cooke – digital editing
- Zach Crowell – programming (9)
- Jesse Frasure – programming (7)
- Mike Gaydusek – assistant engineering (11)
- Scott Johnson – production assisting
- Andrew Mendelson – mastering
- Joey Moi – production, programming (1–12, 14–15), recording, mixing
- Jamie Moore – programming (6)
- Eivind Nordland – engineering
- Jordan Schmidt – programming (8, 12)

Design

- Gina Ketchum – hair, make up, wardrobe
- Lloyd Aur Norman – art direction, design
- Ryan Smith – photography

== Charts ==
=== Weekly charts ===
Chart (2016–2017)	Peak position
Australian Albums (ARIA)	7
Canadian Albums (Billboard)	2
New Zealand Heatseekers Albums (RMNZ)	1
Scottish Albums (Official Charts)	41
Swiss Albums (Schweizer Hitparade)	94
UK Albums (Official Charts)	91
US Billboard 200	2
US Top Country Albums (Billboard)	1

=== Year-end charts ===
Chart (2016)	Position
US Billboard 200	79
US Top Country Albums (Billboard)	11
Chart (2017)	Position
Canadian Albums (Billboard)	42
US Billboard 200	40
US Top Country Albums (Billboard)	5
Chart (2018)	Position
US Billboard 200	118
US Top Country Albums (Billboard)	14
Chart (2019)	Position
US Top Country Albums (Billboard)	28

== Certifications ==
Region	Certification	Certified units/sales
United States (RIAA)	Platinum	1,000,000^{‡}
^{‡} Sales+streaming figures based on certification alone.
