= Talk You Out of It =

2018 single by Florida Georgia Line

Single by Florida Georgia Line

from the album Can't Say I Ain't Country
- Released: November 5, 2018
- Genre: Country
- Length: 3:22
- Label: BLMG
- Songwriters: Michael Hardy; Hunter Phelps; Jameson Rodgers; Alysa Vanderheym
- Producers: Joey Moi; Florida Georgia Line

Florida Georgia Line singles chronology
"Simple" (2018)	"Talk You Out of It" (2018)	"Blessings" (2019)

Music videos
- "Talk You Out Of It" on YouTube
- "Talk You Out of It (Lyric Video)" on YouTube

"Talk You Out of It" is a song recorded by American country music duo Florida Georgia Line. It is their sixteenth solo single release, and the second from their fourth studio album Can't Say I Ain't Country. The song was written by Michael Hardy, Hunter Phelps, Jameson Rodgers and Alysa Vanderheym.

== Content ==
The song features elements of country music and contemporary R&B, with a banjo riff and drum machine, with lead vocals by Tyler Hubbard. Taste of Country writer Sterling Whitaker described it as a "slow, sexy ballad", and said of its lyrical content that "The narrator manages to talk his lady love into getting ready to hit the town, but once he sees her in the dress she chose, his intentions change" Hubbard referred to it as the "baby-making song".

== Commercial performance ==
The song has sold 169,000 copies in the United States as of September 2019. On the Billboard Hot 100, the song managed to peak at number 57 on the week of August 17, 2019. Despite not reaching the top 50, the song also managed to appear on the year-end chart of the Billboard Hot 100 in 2019 at 94. By doing so, it became the lowest-peaking song to ever make a year-end Hot 100, passing "El Perdón" by Nicky Jam and Enrique Iglesias which peaked at 56.

== Music video ==
The song's music video debuted in November 2018, and was directed by Justin Clough. It features intimate scenes of both members of Florida Georgia Line (Hubbard and Brian Kelley), along with their respective wives. Florida Georgia Line also released behind-the-scenes footage of the video a month later.

== Live performance ==
Florida Georgia Line performed the song on The Tonight Show Starring Jimmy Fallon on February 14, 2019, and on The Ellen DeGeneres Show exactly one week later.

== Charts ==
=== Weekly charts ===
Chart (2018–2019)	Peak position
Australia Country (TMN)	12
Canada Hot 100 (Billboard)	97
Canada Country (Billboard)	28
US Billboard Hot 100	57
US Country Airplay (Billboard)	11
US Hot Country Songs (Billboard)	11
US Rolling Stone Top 100	94

=== Year-end charts ===
Chart (2019)	Position
US Billboard Hot 100	94
US Country Airplay (Billboard)	35
US Hot Country Songs (Billboard)	12

== Certifications ==
Region	Certification	Certified units/sales
United States (RIAA)	2× Platinum	2,000,000^{‡}
^{‡} Sales+streaming figures based on certification alone.
