= May We All =

Single by Florida Georgia Line featuring Tim McGraw

from the album Dig Your Roots
- Released: July 15, 2016
- Genre: Country
- Length: 3:46
- Label: Republic Nashville
- Songwriters: Rodney Clawson; Jamie Moore
- Producer: Joey Moi

Florida Georgia Line singles chronology
"H.O.L.Y." (2016)	"May We All" (2016)	"God, Your Mama, and Me" (2017)

Tim McGraw singles chronology
"How I'll Always Be" (2016)	"May We All" (2016)	"Speak to a Girl" (2017)

Music video
- "May We All" on YouTube

"May We All" is a song recorded by American country music group Florida Georgia Line and country music artist Tim McGraw. It is the second single from the duo's third studio album, Dig Your Roots, which was released on August 26, 2016. The song was written by Rodney Clawson and Jamie Moore. "May We All" was first released for sale on July 16, 2016, by Republic Nashville as an album and released as a single to radio in August.

== Commercial performance ==
"May We All" debuted at number 27 on the Hot Country Songs chart, selling 22,000 copies in its first week as a pre-release track for the album. It has since reached number two on that chart. It was the most added song on its official US radio add date in August 2016. It first appeared on the Country Airplay chart at number 51, and rose to number 34 the following week. It reached number one on the Country Airplay chart in December 2016. It became Florida Georgia Line's ninth top 40 and seventh top 30 hit on the pop chart, and McGraw's thirty-second top 40 and twenty-second top 30 hit on the pop chart. To date, this is McGraw’s 29th and most recent number one song.

As of July 2017, the song had sold 635,000 copies in the United States. It was certified double Platinum by the RIAA on December 12, 2018.

== Music video ==
The music video was directed by TK McKamy and premiered in August 2016. The video features Florida Georgia Line as racecar drivers and McGraw as the owner of the cars. The drivers are friends at first but fight after Tyler Hubbard, one-half of Florida Georgia Line, puts Brian Kelley, the other half, into the wall at the end of the second race. They reconcile after Kelley spins Hubbard out and ends up flipping the latter's car. Kelley then goes to help Hubbard out of the car. Hubbard's car catches on fire then the car explodes with him in it while his daughter looks on and yells, "Daddy!" and starts to cry. Against track official orders, Kelley pushes the firefighters away before he rushes in and pulls Hubbard out of the burning wreckage. The video ends with Hubbard asking Kelley if he won, to which he responds, "Yeah, buddy. We all Did." The video has them acting only (without singing), the first Florida Georgia Line video to do so. The video was shot in Hohenwald, Tennessee.

== Charts ==
=== Weekly charts ===
Chart (2016–2017)	Peak position
Canada Hot 100 (Billboard)	46
Canada Country (Billboard)	1
US Billboard Hot 100	30
US Country Airplay (Billboard)	1
US Hot Country Songs (Billboard)	2

=== Year-end charts ===
Chart (2016)	Position
US Hot Country Songs (Billboard)	41

Chart (2017)	Position
US Country Airplay (Billboard)	52
US Hot Country Songs (Billboard)	51

== Certifications ==
Region	Certification	Certified units/sales
Australia (ARIA)	Gold	35,000^{‡}
New Zealand (RMNZ)	Gold	15,000^{‡}
United States (RIAA)	3× Platinum	3,000,000^{‡}
^{‡} Sales+streaming figures based on certification alone.
