= Unlearn (album) =

2023 album by Griffen Palmer

Studio album by Griffen Palmer
- Released: April 28, 2023
- Recorded: Nashville, Tennessee
- Genre: Country; country pop
- Length: 31:51
- Label: Big Loud
- Producer: Joey Moi

Singles from Unlearn
- 1. "Second Guessing" Released: January 13, 2023

Unlearn is the debut studio album by Canadian country music singer-songwriter Griffen Palmer. It was produced by Joey Moi and released on April 28, 2023, via Big Loud Records. The album includes Palmer's debut single "Second Guessing".

== Background ==
Palmer began writing songs in preparation for his debut album four years prior to its eventual release. He wrote every track on Unlearn with Geoff Warburton, with the two being the only songwriters on every track except "Second Guessing". Palmer told Front Porch Music on their "On the Front Porch" podcast that he did not set out to solely record songs that he and Warburton had written for Unlearn. He chose to record "25 to Life" and continued to select other songs from total of around 200 songs he had written, with the final ten tracks simply happening to songs he and Warburton had written together. Palmer said that he "tried with every song to make it a little snapshot of a period at least of life that I went through and hopefully that other people went through as well".

The album's lead single "Second Guessing" was the first song Palmer in January 2023 released after signing with Big Loud. He pitched the original version of the song to American duo Florida Georgia Line on the television series Songland in 2020, while competing against three other songwriters. The duo chose to record the final version for their 2021 studio album Life Rolls On. Palmer elected to record his own version as it was "such an important part of his story as an artist". "25 to Life" and the title track "Unlearn" were later released as promotional singles, with the latter track being released concurrently with the announcement of the album in March 2023. Palmer described "Unlearn" as the "most personal track" on the album, which is why he elected to make it the title track.

== Critical reception ==
Tamara Shevon of Parton and Pearl described Unlearn as a "top to bottom flawless album", adding that "each track placement feels methodical, intentionally showing the ups and downs of finding love". She highlighted "Late to the Party" and the title track "Unlearn" as standout songs. Pip Ellwood-Hughes of Entertainment Focus gave the album a 3.5/5 star review, stating that while the album "may play it a little too safe at times, it sets out Palmer’s stall and really showcases his abilities as a songwriter". He added that Palmer's voice is "perfect for country radio" and the album "suggests there's a lot more untapped potential that we’ll see on further releases". Dan Wharton of Holler gave Unlearn a 6/10 review, noting the title track and "25 to Life" as standout songs. He stated that the album "teases immense potential, whilst still leaving much to be discovered," adding that while the "material could be sharper, when Palmer is on it, he’s really on it". Wharton also applauded Joey Moi's production, specifically highlighting the songs "By the Way" and "Small Town After All". An uncredited review from All Country News stated that Palmer "put his lyrical cleverness and adventurous artistry on full display" with the album, describing him as a "a masterful storyteller who means every word he writes". Nicole Piering of Country Swag favourably reviewed Unlearn, noting Palmer's "smooth voice, country hooks, and incredibly impressive lyrics", stating that the album is a "surefire way to introduce him to a legion of new fans".

== Track listing ==
No.	Title	Writer(s)	Length
1.	"Second Guessing"	Griffen Palmer; Geoff Warburton; Corey Crowder; Ester Dean; Andrew DeRoberts; Tyler Hubbard; Brian Kelley; Shane McAnally; Benjamin Simonetti; Ryan Tedder	3:09
2.	"25 to Life"	Palmer; Warburton	3:26
3.	"Unlearn"	Palmer; Warburton	3:37
4.	"Put Me Through Hello"	Palmer; Warburton	3:15
5.	"By the Way"	Palmer; Warburton	2:41
6.	"Small Town After All"	Palmer; Warburton	3:14
7.	"Came Here to Leave"	Palmer; Warburton	3:13
8.	"Late to the Party"	Palmer; Warburton	2:52
9.	"How Many Beers"	Palmer; Warburton	2:43
10.	"Bottles on the Table"	Palmer; Warburton	3:37
Total length:			31:51

== Charts ==
=== Singles ===
Year	Single	Peak chart positions
Year	Single	CAN Country
2023	"Second Guessing"	10

=== Promotional singles ===
Year	Single
2023	"25 to Life"
2023	"Unlearn"

== Release history ==
Release formats for Unlearn
Country	Date	Format	Label	Ref.
Various	April 28, 2023	Digital download	Big Loud Records	
Various	April 28, 2023	Streaming	Big Loud Records	

== Awards and nominations ==
Year	Association	Category	Nominated work	Result	Ref.
2024	Country Music Association of Ontario	Album / EP of the Year	Unlearn	Nominated	
