= Thank You Lord (song) =

2021 single by Chris Tomlin

Single by Chris Tomlin featuring Thomas Rhett and Florida Georgia Line

from the album Chris Tomlin & Friends
- Released: August 13, 2021
- Recorded: 2020
- Genre: CCM; worship; Christian country
- Length: 2:48
- Label: Sparrow; Capitol CMG
- Songwriters: Chris Tomlin; Corey Crowder; David Garcia; Thomas Rhett; Tyler Hubbard
- Producers: Brian Kelley; Chris Tomlin; Corey Crowder; Tyler Hubbard

Chris Tomlin singles chronology
"I See You" (2021)	"Thank You Lord" (2021)	"Emmanuel God With Us" (2021)

Thomas Rhett singles chronology
"Country Again" (2021)	"Thank You Lord" (2021)	"Slow Down Summer" (2021)

Florida Georgia Line singles chronology
"Lil Bit" (2020)	"Thank You Lord" (2021)

Music video
- "Thank You Lord" on YouTube

"Thank You Lord" is a song by American contemporary Christian musician Chris Tomlin featuring American country music singer-songwriter Thomas Rhett and country duo Florida Georgia Line. The song was released as the third single from his thirteenth studio album, Chris Tomlin & Friends (2020), to Christian radio in the United States on August 13, 2021. Tomlin co-wrote the song with Corey Crowder, David Garcia, Thomas Rhett, and Tyler Hubbard. The single was produced by Brian Kelley, Chris Tomlin, Corey Crowder, and Tyler Hubbard.

"Thank You Lord" peaked at No. 11 on the US Hot Christian Songs chart, and No. 37 on the Hot Country Songs chart.

The song was also Florida Georgia Line's final single before their breakup the following year.

== Background ==
On June 26, 2020, Chris Tomlin released "Thank You Lord" featuring Thomas Rhett and Florida Georgia Line alongside "Who You Are to Me" featuring Lady A, as the first two promotional singles from Chris Tomlin & Friends in the lead-up to its release, slated for July 31, 2020. On August 13, 2021, "Thank You Lord" impacted Christian radio in the United States as the third single from the album.

== Composition ==
"Thank You Lord" is composed in the key of A with a tempo of 105 beats per minute, and a musical time signature of 4/4.

== Commercial performance ==
"Thank You Lord" debuted at No. 15 on the US Hot Christian Songs chart dated July 11, 2020, concurrently charting at No. 2 on the Christian Digital Song Sales chart. The song peaked at No. 11 and spent a total of twenty weeks appearing on the chart.

== Music video ==
The music video of "Thank You Lord" was published via Chris Tomlin's YouTube channel on July 15, 2020.

== Live performances ==
On August 19, 2020, Chris Tomlin performed "Thank You Lord" alongside Thomas Rhett and Florida Georgia Line on The Late Late Show with James Corden. On August 25, 2020, Chris Tomlin performed "Thank You Lord" alongside Thomas Rhett and Florida Georgia Line on Today with Hoda & Jenna.

== Personnel ==
Adapted from AllMusic.

- Adam Ayan — mastering
- David Cook — mixing assistant
- Corey Crowder — producer
- Florida Georgia Line — featured artist, vocals
- Tyler Hubbard — producer
- Jeff Juliano — mixing
- Brian Kelley — producer
- Thomas Rhett — featured artist, vocals
- Chris Tomlin — primary artist, producer

== Charts ==
=== Weekly charts ===
Weekly chart performance for "Thank You Lord"
Chart (2020–2021)	Peak position
US Hot Christian Songs (Billboard)	11
US Christian Airplay (Billboard)	6
US Christian AC (Billboard)	14
US Hot Country Songs (Billboard)	37

=== Year-end charts ===
Year-end chart performance for "Thank You Lord"
Chart (2020)	Position
US Christian Songs (Billboard)	62
Chart (2021)	Position
US Christian Airplay (Billboard)	41
Chart (2022)	Position
US Christian Songs (Billboard)	81

== Certifications ==
Region	Certification	Certified units/sales
United States (RIAA)	Gold	500,000^{‡}
^{‡} Sales+streaming figures based on certification alone.

== Release history ==
Release history and formats for "Thank You Lord"
Region	Date	Format	Label	Ref.
Various	June 26, 2020	Digital download (promotional release); streaming (promotional release)	Sparrow Records; Capitol Christian Music Group	
United States	August 13, 2021	Christian radio	Sparrow Records; Capitol Christian Music Group	
