= God, Your Mama, and Me =

Single by Florida Georgia Line featuring Backstreet Boys

from the album Dig Your Roots
- Released: January 23, 2017
- Recorded: NightBird Recording Studios in West Hollywood, CA
- Genre: Country; country pop
- Length: 3:04
- Label: Nashville Harbor Records & Entertainment
- Songwriters: Josh Kear; Hillary Lindsey; Gordie Sampson
- Producer: Joey Moi

Florida Georgia Line singles chronology
"May We All" (2016)	"God, Your Mama, and Me" (2017)	"Smooth" (2017)

Backstreet Boys singles chronology
"Show 'Em (What You're Made Of)" (2013)	"God, Your Mama, and Me" (2017)	"Don't Go Breaking My Heart" (2018)

Music video
- "God, Your Mama, and Me" on YouTube

"God, Your Mama, and Me" is a song recorded by American country music duo Florida Georgia Line and pop music group Backstreet Boys. It is the third single from the duo's third studio album, Dig Your Roots, which was released on August 26, 2016. The song was written by Josh Kear, Hillary Lindsey and Gordie Sampson.

== Background ==
Tyler Hubbard, one-half of Florida Georgia Line, told the blog Taste of Country that it "is just such a well-written song. A song that when we heard it, we fell in love with it. We never really heard it said that way, you know, and heard it put that way, but it’s so true and that’s how we felt about our wives and just naturally drawn to that song". The song was initially recorded with only Florida Georgia Line on vocals. On June 11, 2016, Nick Carter of the Backstreet Boys, who had become friendly with Florida Georgia Line, attended one of the duo's performances during the CMA Music Festival at Nissan Stadium in Nashville. After the show, they played some of their newly recorded songs on the tour bus for Carter, and Carter became interested in the song "God, Your Mama, and Me". The duo then asked members of the Backstreet Boys via their manager Seth England if the group would be interested in performing with them, and all five members of the group agreed. In the song, Carter sang on the second verse, AJ McLean and Kevin Richardson sang on the bridge, and Brian Littrell and Howie Dorough provided background vocals. The song was recorded on June 27, 2016, at NightBird Recording Studios in West Hollywood, CA.

== Commercial performance ==
The song first became available as an instant gratification track on iTunes just before the album release, and it entered the Hot Country Song on the chart date of September 10, 2016 based on 25,000 copies sold in the first week. It debuted on Country Airplay at No. 51 for the chart of January 28, 2017 as it was being released to radio as a single. The song entered the Hot 100 at No. 92 for chart dated March 18, 2017, the Backstreet Boys' first return to the chart since 2007. The single was certified Platinum by the RIAA on May 23, 2017, and double Platinum in 2019. It has sold 435,000 copies in the United States as of August 2017.

== Music video ==
The music video for the song was uploaded to Florida Georgia Line's YouTube channel on February 20, 2017. The video features clips of each singer, recorded on cell phones and Go Pros, surprising their wives with random acts of love and kindness. The video has over 45 million views as of August 2022.

== Charts ==
Chart (2017)	Peak position
Canada Hot 100 (Billboard)	79
Canada Country (Billboard)	3
US Billboard Hot 100	46
US Radio Songs (Billboard)	19
US Country Airplay (Billboard)	1
US Hot Country Songs (Billboard)	4

=== Year-end charts ===
Chart (2017)	Position
Canada Country (Billboard)	35
US Country Airplay (Billboard)	37
US Hot Country Songs (Billboard)	14

== Certifications ==
Region	Certification	Certified units/sales
United States (RIAA)	2× Platinum	2,000,000^{‡}
^{‡} Sales+streaming figures based on certification alone.
