= Long Live (Florida Georgia Line song) =

2020 song by Florida Georgia Line

Single by Florida Georgia Line

from the album Life Rolls On
- Released: September 10, 2020
- Genre: Country
- Length: 2:32
- Label: BMLG
- Songwriters: Brian Kelley; Corey Crowder; David Garcia; Josh Miller; Tyler Hubbard
- Producers: Corey Crowder; Florida Georgia Line

Florida Georgia Line singles chronology
"I Love My Country" (2020)	"Long Live" (2020)	"Drinkin' Beer. Talkin' God. Amen." (2020)

Music video
- "Long Live (Lyric Video)" on YouTube

"Long Live" is a song recorded by American country music duo Florida Georgia Line. It was released on September 10, 2020 as the second single from their fifth studio album Life Rolls On. It was written by the duo's members Tyler Hubbard and Brian Kelley, along with David Garcia, Corey Crowder and Josh Miller.

== Content ==
Rolling Stone commented that "'Long Live' is an ode to small-town Friday nights that recalls the duo’s early hits like 'Cruise' and 'Round Here.' 'Long Live' owns beefed-up drums, programmed beats, and a melodic guitar hook that snakes through the recording."

== Music ==
Kelley explained to Billboard: "This song has a throwback, Here's to the Good Times vibe, kind of from our first record. It was a throwback, but kind of new and fresh, and it just feels like an anthem. It's easy to sing along to it. Ever since we wrote it, we couldn't stop singing it."

== Charts ==
=== Weekly charts ===
Chart (2020–2021)	Peak position
Australia Country Hot 50 (TMN)	4
Canada Hot 100 (Billboard)	35
Canada Country (Billboard)	1
US Billboard Hot 100	45
US Country Airplay (Billboard)	1
US Hot Country Songs (Billboard)	4

=== Year-end charts ===
Chart (2020)	Position
US Hot Country Songs (Billboard)	98

Chart (2021)	Position
US Country Airplay (Billboard)	27
US Hot Country Songs (Billboard)	37

== Certifications ==
Region	Certification	Certified units/sales
Canada (Music Canada)	Gold	40,000^{‡}
United States (RIAA)	Gold	500,000^{‡}
^{‡} Sales+streaming figures based on certification alone.
