= Second Guessing (song) =

Florida Georgia Line song

Promotional single by Florida Georgia Line

from the album Life Rolls On
- Released: May 19, 2020
- Genre: Country pop
- Length: 3:07
- Label: Big Machine
- Songwriters: Corey Crowder; Ester Dean; Andrew DeRoberts; Tyler Hubbard; Brian Kelley; Shane McAnally; Griffen Palmer; Benjamin Simonetti; Ryan Tedder; Geoff Warburton
- Producers: Corey Crowder; Tyler Hubbard; Brian Kelley

Music video
- "Second Guessing (From Songland)" on YouTube

"Second Guessing" is a song recorded by American country music duo Florida Georgia Line. The song originated from the duo's appearance on American television series Songland, where singer-songwriter Griffen Palmer pitched the original song to them. It appeared on the duo's 2020 extended play 6-Pack and their subsequent fifth studio album Life Rolls On.

== Background ==
Griffen Palmer, one of the song's original writers, performed the original version of the song on NBC's television show Songland on May 18, 2020, in front of Tyler Hubbard and Brian Kelley of Florida Georgia Line as well as the show's cast of songwriters: Ryan Tedder, Shane McAnally, and Ester Dean. After re-working the song with McAnally, Palmer and "Second Guessing" were selected as the winner of that episode by Florida Georgia Line, who chose to record it over competing songs by Shawn Austin, Lukr, and Victoria Banks.

== Commercial performance ==
"Second Guessing" peaked at number 24 on the Billboard Bubbling Under Hot 100 chart for the week of May 30, 2020, directly following its release. It peaked at number 29 on the Hot Country Songs chart for the same week. It spent two weeks on both charts. In Canada, the song entered and peaked at number 99 on the all-genre Canadian Hot 100 for the same week.

== Music video ==
The official music video for "Second Guessing" premiered on YouTube on May 18, 2020.

== Credits and personnel ==
Adapted from AllMusic.

- Adam Ayan – mastering engineer
- David Cook – mixing assistant
- Corey Crowder – composition, editing, production, programming, recording
- Ester Dean – composition
- Andrew DeRoberts – composition, electric guitar, programming
- Tyler Hubbard – composition, production
- Jeff Juliano – mixing
- Brian Kelley – composition, production
- Alyson McAnally – production coordination
- Shane McAnally – composition
- Griffen Palmer – composition
- Doug Rich – production coordination
- Ben Simonetti – composition
- Janice Soled – production coordination
- Ryan Tedder – composition
- Geoff Warburton – composition
- Derek Wells – dobro, electric guitar
- Alex Wright – Hammond B-3 organ, piano, synthesizer

== Charts ==
Weekly chart performance for "Second Guessing"
| Chart (2020) | Peak position |
|---|---|
| Canada Hot 100 (Billboard) | 99 |
| US Bubbling Under Hot 100 (Billboard) | 24 |
| US Hot Country Songs (Billboard) | 29 |

== Griffen Palmer version ==
"Second Guessing"

Single by Griffen Palmer

from the album Unlearn
- Released: January 13, 2023
- Genre: Country pop
- Length: 3:07
- Label: Big Loud
- Songwriters: Corey Crowder; Ester Dean; Andrew DeRoberts; Tyler Hubbard; Brian Kelley; Shane McAnally; Griffen Palmer; Benjamin Simonetti; Ryan Tedder; Geoff Warburton
- Producer: Joey Moi

Griffen Palmer singles chronology
| "Second Guessing" (2023) | "Heart of Exes" (2023) |

Music video
- "Second Guessing" on YouTube

Canadian country singer-songwriter Griffen Palmer released his own version of the song after signing with Big Loud Records. It is his debut single, and the lead single off his debut album Unlearn, which was released on April 28, 2023.

=== Background ===
Palmer remarked that the song is "such an important part of my story as an artist," and that he was "excited to put my own spin on it and put it out." He added that after his appearance on Songland, people often asked him if he would release his own version of the song, and he was thus happy to release it for them.

=== Critical reception ===
Erica Zisman of Country Swag reviewed Palmer's release of the song favourably, stating that it is a "confident portrayal of what it feels like to be with the right person," and that "Palmer's knack for songwriting is obvious," while "he has the vocals to back it up." Maxim Mower of Holler also gave the song a positive review, writing that Palmer's version "feels noticeably smoother and slicker than Florida Georgia Line's rendition."

=== Live performance ===
Palmer performed the song live on season 27 of ABC's reality television show The Bachelor on February 6, 2023, with his performance being part of a special "one-on-one date" between members of the cast.

=== Music video ===
The official video for Palmer's version of "Second Guessing" was released concurrently with the song on YouTube on January 13, 2020.

=== Charts ===
Chart performance for "Second Guessing"
| Chart (2023) | Peak position |
|---|---|
| Canada Country (Billboard) | 10 |
