= Griffen Palmer =

Canadian singer-songwriter (born 1995)

- Born: September 25, 1995 (age 30)
- Origin: Pickering, Ontario, Canada
- Genres: Country; country pop
- Occupations: Singer, songwriter
- Instruments: Guitar, vocals
- Years active: 2018–present
- Labels: Starseed; Big Loud
- Website: Official website

Griffen Palmer is a Canadian country music singer and songwriter. Palmer released his debut album Unlearn on April 28, 2023, via Big Loud Records. He has charted with the singles "Second Guessing", "Heart of Exes", and "Fight with You".

== Early life ==
Palmer was raised in Pickering, Ontario, and credits his early love of music to his father, who played in bands while Palmer was a child. He began playing instruments when he was eight years old, and gained a strong interest in country music while he was a teenager in high school. After graduating high school, Palmer moved to Ohio to play rugby and study at Bowling Green State University, while continuing to play in bands. Palmer cites John Mayer, Elton John, and Kings of Leon as artists he listened to as a kid, but considers Chris Stapleton and Sam Hunt to be more recent musical influences. Canadian television personality and former professional football quarterback Jesse Palmer is Palmer's first cousin.

== Career ==
After completing his degree, Palmer returned home to Pickering and met songwriter Geoff Warburton at a house party. They formed a partnership, and Palmer signed a management deal with Starseed Entertainment. Shortly thereafter, he moved to Nashville, Tennessee, where he promptly signed a publishing deal with Big Loud Publishing in 2019. In 2020, Palmer appeared on the NBC television show Songland, where he performed the original song "Second Guessing" for American country duo Florida Georgia Line and the judges. After working on the track with the show's judges, it was selected as the winner of that episode, and Florida Georgia Line released it, later including it on their Life Rolls On album. That same year, two songs Palmer wrote became radio singles as Keith Urban recorded "Polaroid", and MacKenzie Porter recorded "Drinkin' Songs". Additionally, he has written songs that were recorded by other artists including Jade Eagleson, The Band Camino, Chelsea Cutler, Diplo, Tyler Shaw, and Nate Haller.

In January 2023, Palmer signed with Big Loud Records, and released his own version of "Second Guessing" as his debut single. The next month, he returned to national television in the United States and performed "Second Guessing" on ABC's reality television show The Bachelor. In March 2023, Palmer released the songs "25 to Life" and "Unlearn", with the latter being released concurrently with the announcement that his debut album Unlearn would be released on April 28, 2023. He received a nomination for "Breakthrough Artist or Group of the Year" at the 2023 Canadian Country Music Awards. In November 2023, Palmer released the single "Heart of Exes”.

In May 2025, Palmer released the single "Fight with You", a collaboration with his fiancée and fellow Canadian singer-songwriter Madison Kozak.

== Discography ==
=== Albums ===
Title	Details
Unlearn	Release date: April 28, 2023; Label: Big Loud Records; Format: Digital download, streaming

=== Singles ===
Year	Title	Peak chart positions	Album
Year	Title	CAN Country	Album
2023	"Second Guessing"	10	Unlearn
2023	"Heart of Exes"	58	Non-album single
2025	"Fight with You" (featuring Madison Kozak)	36	TBA

=== Promotional singles ===
Year	Title	Album
2023	"25 to Life"	Unlearn
2023	"Unlearn"	Unlearn

=== Music videos ===
Year	Title
2023	"Second Guessing"
2023	"25 to Life"
2023	"Unlearn"
2023	"Put Me Through Hello"
2023	"By the Way"

== Awards and nominations ==
Year	Association	Category	Nominated work	Result	Ref
2023	Canadian Country Music Association	Breakthrough Artist or Group of the Year	—N/a	Nominated	
2024	Country Music Association of Ontario	Album / EP of the Year	Unlearn	Nominated	
2024	Country Music Association of Ontario	Fans' Choice	—N/a	Nominated	
2025	Country Music Association of Ontario	Songwriter(s) of the Year	"Hangover at My Place" (with Tebey, Stuart Walker, Danick Dupelle)	Nominated	
