= Blessings (Florida Georgia Line song) =

Single by Florida Georgia Line

from the album Can't Say I Ain't Country
- Released: September 23, 2019
- Genre: Country
- Length: 3:16
- Label: BMLG
- Songwriters: Tyler Hubbard; Brian Kelley; Tom Douglas; Jesse Frasure; Jordan Schmidt; Ernest Keith Smith
- Producers: Joey Moi; Florida Georgia Line

Florida Georgia Line singles chronology
"Talk You Out of It" (2018)	"Blessings" (2019)	"I Love My Country" (2020)

Music videos
- "Blessings" on YouTube
- "Blessings (Lyric Video)" on YouTube

"Blessings" is a song recorded by American country music duo Florida Georgia Line. It was the third and final single from their fourth studio album Can't Say I Ain't Country. Tyler Hubbard and Brian Kelley, the duo's two members, co-wrote the song with Tom Douglas, Jesse Frasure, Jordan Schmidt, and Ernest Keith Smith. It is their lowest-peaking single to date, missing the top 20 of the Billboard Country Airplay and Hot Country Songs charts.

== Content and history ==
Tom Roland of Billboard called the song a "nifty patchwork of homespun phrases, acoustic accents and sweet melody is a satisfying package wrapped with an understated reminder: Always take time to count your blessings." Duo member Brian Kelley began writing the song with Jordan Schmidt and Ernest K. Smith. Smith came up with the idea to write the song's main guitar progression in DADGAD tuning after learning about the tuning in a Guitar Center. The duo then refined the song with the assistance of Tom Douglas, who added a verse, and Jesse Frasure, who assisted in arrangements. Produced by Joey Moi, the song features Ilya Toshinsky on acoustic guitar, Russ Pahl on pedal steel guitar, Jerry Roe on snare drums, and Dave Cohen on Hammond organ.

The duo released a music video for the song on December 4, 2019. It features scenes of them with their wives and families.

== Chart performance ==
"Blessings" peaked at number 23 on both the Hot Country Songs and the Country Airplay, representing the duo's lowest showing on either chart to date. It also became their first official single to fail to chart the Billboard Hot 100 altogether: ending a string of sixteen consecutive charting single releases.

=== Weekly charts ===
Chart (2019–2020)	Peak position
Canada Country (Billboard)	32
US Bubbling Under Hot 100 (Billboard)	18
US Country Airplay (Billboard)	23
US Hot Country Songs (Billboard)	23

=== Year-end charts ===
Chart (2020)	Position
US Hot Country Songs (Billboard)	82

== Certifications ==
Region	Certification	Certified units/sales
United States (RIAA)	Gold	500,000^{‡}
^{‡} Sales+streaming figures based on certification alone.
