= H.O.L.Y. =

Single by Florida Georgia Line

from the album Dig Your Roots
- Released: April 29, 2016
- Genre: Country pop
- Length: 3:14
- Label: Republic Nashville
- Songwriters: busbee; Nate Cyphert; William Wiik Larsen
- Producer: Joey Moi

Florida Georgia Line singles chronology
"Confession" (2015)	"H.O.L.Y." (2016)	"May We All" (2016)

Music video
- "H.O.L.Y" on YouTube

"H.O.L.Y." (an acronym for "High on Loving You") is a song recorded by American country music duo Florida Georgia Line. It is the lead single from the duo's third studio album, Dig Your Roots, which was released on August 26, 2016. The song was written by busbee, Nate Cyphert, and William Wiik Larsen. "H.O.L.Y." was first released on April 29, 2016, by Republic Nashville.

In its second week, "H.O.L.Y." jumped from number 39 to number one on the Billboard Hot Country Songs chart, becoming the duo's fifth single to top that chart. It is also their third single to receive a crossover promotion, impacting American Hot AC radio on June 27, 2016.

== Critical reception ==
Jon Freeman of Rolling Stone commented positively on the song, applauding the group's musical evolution; though he did note caution regarding the song's Christian themes, saying "It's hard not to wonder if the FGL guys — both of whom have publicly proclaimed their faith on numerous occasions — will get some flak from religious listeners the way [Maren] Morris has for "My Church" and its perceived shunning of organized worship." Included on Spotify's list of Picks of the Week, Billboard commented the song "takes FGL in a new direction while keeping the infectious sing-along hooks that made the band famous." Kevin John Coyne of Country Universe was much less favorable, giving the song a failing grade and writing "A baffling mix of romanticism and religious imagery, Florida Georgia Line’s attempt at respectable music only puts their musical incompetence into sharper relief. Little more than a Curtis Stigers throwaway, “H.O.L.Y.” (“High On Loving You”) is adult contemporary drivel, the equivalent of those “serious ballads” that teenybopper acts like New Kids on the Block and Color Me Badd used to show they’d grown up, but only ended up as signals that their careers were ending because their audiences were outgrowing them."

== Commercial performance ==
The song debuted with 125,000 copies sold in the United States in its debut week, the second best-selling digital song of the week. It propelled the song to number one on the Hot Country Songs chart, as well as debuting number 20 on the Billboard Hot 100 chart dating May 21, 2016. It eventually stayed at number one on the Hot Country Songs chart for eighteen consecutive weeks and peaked at number 14 on the Hot 100 chart dating July 16, 2016 (where it ranked number 49 on that chart's year-end list for 2016). The song debuted on the Country Airplay chart at number 26 a week before it was released for sale, where it peaked at number one. It has also reached number one on the Canada Country chart and number 24 on the Canadian Hot 100 chart. The song sold over a million copies in August 2016 in the United States, and has sold 1,550,000 copies as of July 2017. It was certified quadruple Platinum by the RIAA on March 15, 2018.

== Music video ==
The music video was directed by TK McKamy and filmed at The Twelve Apostles, Australia. It premiered on April 29, 2016.

== Charts ==
=== Weekly charts ===
Weekly chart performance for "H.O.L.Y."
Chart (2016)	Peak position
Australia (ARIA)	94
Canada Hot 100 (Billboard)	24
Canada Country (Billboard)	1
Netherlands (Global Top 40)	33
US Billboard Hot 100	14
US Adult Contemporary (Billboard)	19
US Adult Pop Airplay (Billboard)	21
US Country Airplay (Billboard)	1
US Hot Country Songs (Billboard)	1

=== Year-end charts ===
2016 year-end chart rankings for "H.O.L.Y."
Chart (2016)	Position
Canada (Canadian Hot 100)	65
Netherlands (Global Top 40)	78
US Billboard Hot 100	49
US Country Airplay (Billboard)	31
US Hot Country Songs (Billboard)	1

=== Decade-end charts ===
Decade-end chart rankings for the 2010s of "H.O.L.Y."
Chart (2010–2019)	Position
US Hot Country Songs (Billboard)	5

== Certifications ==
Region	Certification	Certified units/sales
Australia (ARIA)	Gold	35,000^{‡}
New Zealand (RMNZ)	Gold	15,000^{‡}
United States (RIAA)	6× Platinum	6,000,000^{‡}
^{‡} Sales+streaming figures based on certification alone.

== Release history ==
Country	Date	Format	Label	Ref.
North America	April 28, 2016	Digital download	Republic Nashville; Big Machine Label Group	
Asia	April 28, 2016	Digital download	Republic Nashville; Big Machine Label Group	
Europe	April 28, 2016	Digital download	Republic Nashville; Big Machine Label Group	
Oceania	April 28, 2016	Digital download	Republic Nashville; Big Machine Label Group	
United States	April 28, 2016	Country radio	Republic Nashville	
United States	June 27, 2016	Hot / Modern / AC radio	Republic Nashville	
United States	July 26, 2016	Contemporary hit radio	Big Machine Label Group; Republic	
