= Can't Say I Ain't Country =

Studio album by Florida Georgia Line
- Released: February 15, 2019
- Genres: Country; country pop
- Length: 53:07
- Labels: BMLG Records; Tree Vibez
- Producers: Joey Moi (all tracks); Florida Georgia Line (all tracks); Mark Holman (track 3); David Garcia (tracks 7,18)

Florida Georgia Line chronology
Dig Your Roots (2016)	Can't Say I Ain't Country (2019)	6-Pack (2020)

Singles from Can't Say I Ain't Country
- 1. "Simple" Released: June 1, 2018; 2. "Talk You Out of It" Released: November 5, 2018; 3. "Blessings" Released: September 23, 2019

Can't Say I Ain't Country is the fourth studio album by American country music duo Florida Georgia Line. It was released on February 15, 2019, through the Big Machine Label Group. It includes the singles "Simple" and "Talk You Out of It", as well as the tracks "Colorado" and "Sittin' Pretty". It was supported by a tour of the same name from May 2019.

== Background and composition ==
Tyler Hubbard told Entertainment Tonight: "We've been working on that album for over a year now, so BK and I are definitely ready." On the sound of the album, he remarked: "A lot of the music is just kind of a throwback -- an FGL take on kind of what we grew up on, '90s country. It's a well-rounded album. We got stuff we wrote and recorded just for the live show. We got some collaborations with Jason Derulo, Jason Aldean. So, there's a little bit of everything."

== Critical reception ==
Professional ratings
Aggregate scores
Source	Rating
Metacritic	58/100
Review scores
Source	Rating
AllMusic	4/5 stars
Exclaim!	7/10
Rolling Stone	2.5/5 stars

At Metacritic, which assigns a normalized rating out of 100 to reviews from mainstream critics, the album has an average score of 58 based on 5 reviews, indicating "mixed or average reviews". Dave Simpson of The Guardian rated the album two out of five stars, heavily panning the album's cliched bro-country lyrics. Jonathan Bernstein of Rolling Stone gave the album two and a half out of five stars, describing it as "a defensive, winking response from the act that’s come to serve as shorthand for everything wrong with modern country." and adding "It’s full of attempts to shore up their credibility, along with jabs at detractors (see the title track and the Nineties-rap-referencing skits)."

== Commercial performance ==
Can't Say I Ain't Country debuted at number four on the US Billboard 200, giving the duo their fourth US top-five album. It entered with 50,000 album-equivalent units, including 29,000 pure album sales. The album has sold 107,000 copies in the United States as of March 2020, and 644,000 units consumed in total in the United States.

== Track listing ==
No.	Title	Writer(s)	Length
1.	"Tyler Got Him a Tesla" (skit) (featuring Brother Jervel)		0:41
2.	"Can't Say I Ain't Country"	Tyler Hubbard; Brian Kelley; Corey Crowder; Michael Hardy	2:56
3.	"Simple"	Hubbard; Kelley; Hardy; Mark Holman	3:05
4.	"Talk You Out of It"	Hardy; Hunter Phelps; Jameson Rodgers; Alysa Vanderheym	3:22
5.	"All Gas No Brakes" (skit) (featuring Brother Jervel)		0:46
6.	"Speed of Love"	Hubbard; Kelley; Jordan Schmidt	2:33
7.	"Women" (featuring Jason Derulo)	Hubbard; Kelley; Jason Derulo; David Garcia; Josh Miller	3:31
8.	"People Are Different"	Hardy; Holman; Hillary Lindsey	3:34
9.	"Told You"	Hubbard; Kelley; Dallas Davidson	3:59
10.	"Sack'a Puppies" (skit) (featuring Brother Jervel)		0:40
11.	"Y'all Boys" (featuring Hardy)	Jesse Frasure; Ashley Gorley; Hardy; Brett Tyler	2:33
12.	"Small Town"	Hubbard; Kelley; Hardy; Schmidt	3:16
13.	"Sittin' Pretty"	Nick Donley; Hardy; Jake Mitchell	3:06
14.	"Catfish Nuggets" (skit) (featuring Brother Jervel)		0:50
15.	"Can't Hide Red" (featuring Jason Aldean)	Hubbard; Kelley; Rob Hatch; James McNair; Ben Stennis	3:02
16.	"Colorado"	Drew Green; Hardy; Phelps	2:57
17.	"Like You Never Had It"	Hubbard; Kelley; Holman; Morgan Wallen	2:58
18.	"Swerve"	Hubbard; Kelley; Garcia; Miller	3:21
19.	"Blessings"	Hubbard; Kelley; Tom Douglas; Frasure; Schmidt; Ernest Keith Smith	3:16
Total length:			53:07

Expanded edition bonus tracks
No.	Title	Writer(s)	Length
20.	"Lit This Year"	Hubbard; Kelley; Crowder	2:46
21.	"Simple" (Acoustic)	Hubbard; Kelley; Hardy; Holman	3:05
22.	"Talk You Out of It" (Acoustic)	Hardy; Phelps; Rodgers; Vanderheym	3:11
23.	"Meant to Be" (with Bebe Rexha)	Rexha; Hubbard; Miller; Garcia	2:45
24.	"Meant to Be" (Live at CMA Fest 2018) (with Bebe Rexha)	Rexha; Hubbard; Miller; Garcia	3:02
Total length:			67:56

== Personnel ==
Adapted from AllMusic.

=== Florida Georgia Line ===
- Tyler Hubbard – vocals
- Brian Kelley – vocals

=== Additional personnel ===
- Jason Aldean – duet vocals on "Can't Hide Red"
- Dave Cohen – keyboards, piano, programming
- Jason Derulo – duet vocals on "Women"
- Paul Franklin – steel guitar
- Jesse Frasure – programming
- David Garcia – programming
- Hardy – electric guitar, programming, duet vocals on "Y'all Boys"
- Mark Holman – programming
- Byron House – upright bass
- Rob Ickes – dobro
- Brother Jervel – featured vocals on "Tyler Got Him a Tesla", "All Gas No Brakes", "Sack'a Puppies", and "Catfish Nuggets"
- Rob McNelley – electric guitar
- Joey Moi – bass guitar, electric guitar, programming
- Russ Pahl – steel guitar
- Jerry Roe – drums, percussion
- Justin Schipper – steel guitar
- Jordan Schmidt – programming
- Jimmie Lee Sloas – bass guitar
- Bryan Sutton – acoustic guitar, mandolin
- Ilya Toshinsky – banjo, dobro, acoustic guitar, electric guitar, mandolin
- Alysa Vanderheym – programming
- Derek Wells – acoustic guitar, electric guitar
- Nir Z. – drums, percussion

== Charts ==
=== Weekly charts ===
Chart (2019)	Peak position
Australian Albums (ARIA)	7
Canadian Albums (Billboard)	4
Scottish Albums (Official Charts)	49
Swiss Albums (Schweizer Hitparade)	52
UK Album Downloads (Official Charts)	26
UK Country Albums (Official Charts)	2
US Billboard 200	4
US Top Country Albums (Billboard)	1

=== Year-end charts ===
Chart (2019)	Position
Australian Top Country Albums (ARIA)	6
US Billboard 200	111
US Top Country Albums (Billboard)	11
Chart (2020)	Position
Australian Top Country Albums (ARIA)	32
US Top Country Albums (Billboard)	43

== Certifications ==
Region	Certification	Certified units/sales
Canada (Music Canada)	Platinum	80,000^{‡}
United States (RIAA)	Gold	500,000^{‡}
^{‡} Sales+streaming figures based on certification alone.
