= I See You (Chris Tomlin and Brandon Lake song) =

2021 song by Chris Tomlin and Brandon Lake

Single by Chris Tomlin and Brandon Lake

from the album Always
- Released: August 6, 2021
- Recorded: 2021
- Genre: Worship; CCM
- Length: 3:48
- Label: Sparrow; Capitol CMG
- Songwriters: Chris Tomlin; Bryan Fowler; Jonas Myrin
- Producer: Bryan Fowler

Chris Tomlin singles chronology
"God Who Listens" (2020)	"I See You" (2021)	"Thank You Lord" (2021)

Brandon Lake singles chronology
"Too Good to Not Believe" (2021)	"I See You" (2021)	"Might Get Loud" (2021)

Music video
- "I See You" (Lyrics) on YouTube

"I See You" is a song by American contemporary Christian musicians Chris Tomlin and Brandon Lake. It was released on August 6, 2021, as the lead single from Tomlin's fourteenth studio album, Always (2022). The song was written by Bryan Fowler, Chris Tomlin, and Jonas Myrin. Bryan Fowler handled the production of the single.

"I See You" peaked at No. 31 on the US Hot Christian Songs chart published by Billboard.

== Background ==
On August 6, 2021, Chris Tomlin announced the release of "I See You" with Brandon Lake as a single, accompanied with the song's lyric video. Tomlin said the message of the song is "all about seeing God throughout the different seasons in life, the ups and the downs."

== Composition ==
"I See You" is composed in the key of D♭ with a tempo of 80 beats per minute, and a musical time signature of 4/4.

== Critical reception ==
Joshua Andre of 365 Days of Inspiring Media gave a negative review of "I See You", describing the song as a "typical CCM song in that Chris and Brandon together passionately and vibrantly relay to us that we can indeed see Jesus in creation and in everything in our lives, ... we are met with an enthusiastic melody… but a melody nonetheless whereby I as a listener am not that impressed. Because you see, it's a track that is forgettable." Andre compared the song's theme to "I See You" by Rich Mullins, "At Your Name" from Tim Hughes, and "God Of Wonders" from Mac Powell and Cliff and Danielle Young. Reviewing for Plugged In, Kristin Smith said "This sweet song reminds us that He is indeed always present, that He longs to be close to us in every moment. In fact, we are promised that the One who sees us will never leave or forsake us, that we can always rest in His love and provision. Tomlin and Lake remind us of that bedrock truth in “I See You.”"

== Commercial performance ==
"I See You" debuted at No. 31 on the US Hot Christian Songs chart dated August 17, 2021, concurrently charting at No. 10 on the Christian Digital Song Sales chart.

== Music video ==
The lyric video of "I See You" was published via Chris Tomlin's YouTube channel on August 6, 2021.

== Track listing ==
"I See You"
No.	Title	Length
1.	"I See You"	3:48

"I See You" — Apple Music bonus content
No.	Title	Length
2.	"I See You" (Lyric video)	3:48
Total length:		7:36

== Personnel ==
Adapted from AllMusic.

- Adam Ayan — mastering engineer
- Jesse Brock — mixing assistant
- Daniel Carson — electric guitar
- Chad Chrisman — A&R
- Nickie Conley — background vocals
- Jason Eskridge — background vocals
- Bryan Fowler — acoustic guitar, background vocals, bass, electric guitar, keyboards, producer, programmer, synthesizer programming
- Brandon Lake — primary artist, vocals
- Paul Mabury — drums
- Sean Moffitt — mixing
- Brad O'Donnell — A&R
- Chris Tomlin — primary artist, vocals

== Charts ==
Weekly chart performance for "I See You"
Chart (2021)	Peak position
US Hot Christian Songs (Billboard)	31
US Christian Airplay (Billboard)	50

== Release history ==
Region	Date	Format	Label	Ref.
Various	August 6, 2021	Digital download; streaming	Sparrow Records; Capitol Christian Music Group	
