= I Love My Country (song) =

Single by Florida Georgia Line

from the album Life Rolls On
- Released: March 27, 2020
- Genre: Country rock
- Length: 3:07
- Label: BMLG
- Songwriters: Corey Crowder; Ernest Keith Smith; Ryan Vojtesak; Kane Brown; Chase McGill; Will Weatherly
- Producers: Corey Crowder; Tyler Hubbard; Brian Kelley

Florida Georgia Line singles chronology
"Blessings" (2019)	"I Love My Country" (2020)	"Long Live" (2020)

Music video
- "I Love My Country" on YouTube

"I Love My Country" is a song recorded by American country music duo Florida Georgia Line. It was released in March 2020 as the first single from their fifth studio album Life Rolls On, and was included on their 6-Pack EP.

== Content ==
The duo released the song on March 27, 2020. Corey Crowder co-wrote the song with Ernest Keith Smith, Ryan Vojtesak, Kane Brown, Chase McGill, and Will Weatherly, and also produced it. USA Today referred to the song as a "country-rock jam tailor-made for summertime."

Billy Dukes of Taste of Country called the song "the kind of country-rocker they built their live show on" and noted the "banjo, heavy drum beats and electric guitars" in the production. Jon Freeman of Rolling Stone Country thought that the song showed influence from country music of the 1990s.

== Charts ==
=== Weekly charts ===
Chart (2020)	Peak position
Australia Country Hot 50 (TMN)	15
Canada Hot 100 (Billboard)	67
Canada Country (Billboard)	1
US Billboard Hot 100	40
US Country Airplay (Billboard)	2
US Hot Country Songs (Billboard)	8
US Rolling Stone Top 100	77

=== Year-end charts ===
Chart (2020)	Position
US Country Airplay (Billboard)	29
US Hot Country Songs (Billboard)	23

== Certifications ==
Region	Certification	Certified units/sales
United States (RIAA)	Platinum	1,000,000^{‡}
^{‡} Sales+streaming figures based on certification alone.
