= Chris Tomlin & Friends =

2020 studio album by Chris Tomlin

Studio album by Chris Tomlin
- Released: July 31, 2020
- Recorded: 2020
- Genres: CCM; worship; Christian country
- Length: 42:31
- Labels: Sparrow; Capitol CMG
- Producers: Brian Kelley; Corey Crowder; Chris Tomlin; Tyler Hubbard; Ed Cash; Dave Haywood; David Garcia

Chris Tomlin chronology
Holy Roar (2018)	Chris Tomlin & Friends (2020)	Emmanuel: Christmas Songs of Worship (2021)

Singles from Chris Tomlin & Friends
- 1. "Who You Are to Me" Released: July 10, 2020; 2. "God Who Listens" Released: February 5, 2021; 3. "Thank You Lord" Released: August 13, 2021

Chris Tomlin & Friends is the twelfth solo studio album by American contemporary Christian singer Chris Tomlin. The album was released via Sparrow Records and Capitol CMG on July 31, 2020. The album features guest appearances by Thomas Rhett, Florida Georgia Line, We the Kingdom, Lady A, Bear Rinehart, Needtobreathe, Brett Young, Cassadee Pope, Russell Dickerson, RaeLynn, Chris Lane, and Blessing Offor. Tomlin collaborated with Brian Kelley, Corey Crowder, Tyler Hubbard, Ed Cash, Dave Haywood, and David Garcia in handling the production of the album.

The album was supported by the release of "Who You Are to Me", "God Who Listens" and "Thank You Lord" as singles. "Who You Are to Me" peaked at No. 2 on the US Hot Christian Songs chart. "God Who Listens" peaked at No. 13 on the Hot Christian Songs chart. "Thank You Lord" peaked at No. 11 on the Hot Christian Songs chart.

Chris Tomlin & Friends drew mixed reactions from critics, and it was a commercially successful album upon its release, debuting at number one on Billboard's Top Christian Albums Chart and number six on Top Country Albums in the United States, and at number six on the Official Charts' Official Christian & Gospel Albums Chart in the United Kingdom. The album received a nomination for the GMA Dove Award Pop/Contemporary Album of the Year at the 2021 GMA Dove Awards.

== Release and promotion ==
=== Singles ===
On July 10, 2020, "Who You Are to Me" featuring Lady A was impacted Christian radio in the United States as the lead single from the album. "Who You Are to Me" peaked at No. 2 on the US Hot Christian Songs chart.

On February 5, 2021, "God Who Listens" featuring Thomas Rhett was released as the second single from the album. "God Who Listens" peaked at No. 13 on the Hot Christian Songs chart.

On August 13, 2021, "Thank You Lord" featuring Thomas Rhett and Florida Georgia Line was impacted Christian radio in the United States as the third single from the album. "Thank You Lord" peaked at No. 11 on the Hot Christian Songs chart.

=== Promotional singles ===
On June 26, 2020, Chris Tomlin released "Thank You Lord" featuring Thomas Rhett and Florida Georgia Line, and "Who You Are to Me" featuring Lady A as the first two promotional singles from Chris Tomlin & Friends, being slated for release on July 31, 2020. On July 17, 2020, Tomlin released "Be the Moon" featuring Brett Young and Cassadee Pope as the third and final promotional single from the album.

== Reception ==
=== Critical response ===
Professional ratings
Review scores
Source	Rating
365 Days of Inspiring Media	4.5/5
CCM Magazine	3.5/5 stars
JubileeCast	3.5/5
One Man In The Middle	3/5 stars
Today's Christian Entertainment	3.8/5 stars

Joshua Andre in his 365 Days of Inspiring Media review opined that Chris Tomlin & Friends is "one album for the ages", further adding that "this album comes pretty close" to topping Arriving or Hello Love. CCM Magazine's Dan MacIntosh gave a favourable review of the album, saying "Chris Tomlin sounds like he really enjoyed making Christian music with his (mainly mainstream) friends. These friends also helped the worship music veteran make one of his best albums to date. These are good friends, indeed." Timothy Yap of JubileeCast gave a lacklustre review of the album, saying, "Though Asbury's previous record had that juggernaut hit "The downfall of this project is in two areas: while Tomlin is known for crafting anthems churches can sing to, there's not one of that calibre here. Second, though this record bears his name, Tomlin plays a subsidiary role as a vocalist. One gets the feeling that this doesn't really feel like a Chris Tomlin record." Rob Allwright, reviewing for One Man In The Middle, concluded: "The question has to be at the end of this, has the experiment worked? Sadly I think that overall it hasn't. The songs are easy to categorise into worship or country, there is not really any kind of blend of those genres. That's not to say that all of the songs, whether the worship numbers or the country one's are bad, but some of them are, despite the artists doing their best with them." Kelly Meade, indicating in a three-point-eight star review at Today's Christian Entertainment, said "When you push play on the Chris Tomlin & Friends album, you may be surprised, as I was, by who you’re hearing on some of these songs. However, a strong message of hope and trusting in God with a solid belief is woven throughout."

Reviewing for the Herald-Standard, Clint Rhodes said of the album: "With a little help from his friends, Tomlin is able to share a variety of testimonials on a compelling album about unwavering faith that encourages and transforms through a simplistic message of hope and salvation." In a NewReleaseToday review, Jasmin Patterson spoke of the album, saying "Chris Tomlin & Friends is an album that will appeal to fans of Christian music, country music and lovers of all genres. It's a significant project in that it brings Christian and mainstream artists together, not only to make music, but to share their faith with one another and with their audience."

=== Accolades ===
Awards
Year	Organization	Award	Result	Ref
2021	GMA Dove Awards	Pop/Contemporary Album of the Year	Nominated	

== Commercial performance ==
In the United States, Chris Tomlin & Friends debuted at number one on the Billboard Top Christian Albums chart, having earned 12,000 equivalent album units in the first week of sales. The album is Chris Tomlin's eighth chart-topping release on the Top Christian Albums chart, following Never Lose Sight (2016). Chris Tomlin & Friends launched at number six on the OCC's Official Christian & Gospel Albums Chart in the United Kingdom, in the week ending August 13, 2020.

== Track listing ==
Chris Tomlin & Friends — Standard edition
No.	Title	Writer(s)	Producer(s)	Length
1.	"Thank You Lord (Intro)"	Traditional	Brian Kelley; Chris Tomlin; Corey Crowder; Tyler Hubbard	0:45
2.	"Thank You Lord" (featuring Thomas Rhett and Florida Georgia Line)	Chris Tomlin; Corey Crowder; David Garcia; Thomas Rhett; Tyler Hubbard	Brian Kelley; Chris Tomlin; Corey Crowder; Tyler Hubbard	2:48
3.	"Reaching for You" (featuring We the Kingdom)	Tomlin; Ed Cash; Shay Mooney	Brian Kelley; Chris Tomlin; Corey Crowder; Ed Cash; Tyler Hubbard	4:41
4.	"Who You Are to Me" (featuring Lady A)	Charles Kelley; Tomlin; Dave Haywood; Hillary Scott	Brian Kelley; Chris Tomlin; Corey Crowder; Dave Haywood; Tyler Hubbard	3:50
5.	"God Who Listens" (featuring Thomas Rhett)	Ashley Gorley; Tomlin; Garcia; Rhett	David Garcia	4:09
6.	"Power" (featuring Bear Rinehart of Needtobreathe)	Tomlin; Cash; Pat Barrett	Brian Kelley; Chris Tomlin; Corey Crowder; Tyler Hubbard	3:13
7.	"Be the Moon" (featuring Brett Young and Cassadee Pope)	Tomlin; Crowder; Hubbard	Jacob Sooter	3:34
8.	"Sing" (featuring Russell Dickerson and Florida Georgia Line)	Brian Kelley; Cary Barlowe; Tomlin; Crowder; Hubbard	Brian Kelley; Chris Tomlin; Corey Crowder; Tyler Hubbard	2:46
9.	"Chase Me Down" (featuring RaeLynn)	Hannah Ellis; Josh Kerr; RaeLynn	Brian Kelley; Chris Tomlin; Corey Crowder; Tyler Hubbard	3:28
10.	"Gifts From God" (featuring Chris Lane)	Tomlin; Crowder; Hubbard	Brian Kelley; Chris Tomlin; Corey Crowder; Tyler Hubbard	3:22
11.	"Forever Home" (featuring Florida Georgia Line)	Gorley; B. Kelley; Crowder; Hubbard	Brian Kelley; Chris Tomlin; Corey Crowder; Tyler Hubbard	3:27
12.	"Together" (featuring Russell Dickerson)	B. Kelley; Tomlin; Crowder; Russell Dickerson; Hubbard	Brian Kelley; Chris Tomlin; Corey Crowder; Tyler Hubbard	2:58
13.	"Tin Roof" (featuring Blessing Offor)	Blessing Offor; Natalie Hemby	Brian Kelley; Chris Tomlin; Corey Crowder; Tyler Hubbard	3:23
Total length:				42:31

Chris Tomlin & Friends — Apple Music bonus video content
No.	Title	Length
14.	"Thank You Lord" (featuring Thomas Rhett and Florida Georgia Line; lyric video)	2:49
15.	"Who You Are to Me" (featuring Lady A; lyric video)	3:51
16.	"Be the Moon" (featuring Brett Young and Cassadee Pope; lyric video)	3:35
Total length:		52:15

== Personnel ==
Credits adapted from Tidal.

- Adam Ayan — mastering engineer (tracks 1—13)
- Ed Cash — producer (track 3)
- David Cook — mixing assistant (tracks 2, 4, 7)
- Corey Crowder — producer (tracks 1—4, 6—13)
- Russell Dickerson — featured artist, vocals (track 8, 12)
- Florida Georgia Line — featured artist, vocals (tracks 2, 8, 11)
- David Garcia — producer (track 5)
- Dave Haywood — producer (track 4)
- Tyler Hubbard — producer (tracks 1—4, 6—13)
- Jeff Juliano — mixing (tracks 1—13)
- Brian Kelley — producer (tracks 1—4, 6—13)
- Lady A — featured artist, vocals (track 4)
- Chris Lane — featured artist, vocals (track 10)
- Needtobreathe — featured artist (track 6)
- Blessing Offor — featured artist, vocals (track 13)
- Cassadee Pope — featured artist, vocals (track 7)
- RaeLynn — featured artist, vocals (track 9)
- Thomas Rhett — featured artist, vocals (track 2, 5)
- Bear Rinehart — featured artist, vocals (track 6)
- Chris Tomlin — primary artist (tracks 1—13), producer (tracks 1—4, 6—13)
- We the Kingdom — featured artist, vocals (track 3)
- Brett Young — featured artist, vocals (track 7)

== Charts ==
=== Weekly charts ===
Chart performance for Chris Tomlin & Friends
Chart (2021)	Peak position
UK Christian & Gospel Albums (OCC)	6
US Billboard 200	60
US Top Christian Albums (Billboard)	1
US Top Country Albums (Billboard)	6

=== Year-end charts ===
Year-end chart performance for Chris Tomlin & Friends
Chart (2020)	Position
US Christian Albums (Billboard)	34
US Top Country Albums (Billboard)	86
Chart (2021)	Position
US Christian Albums (Billboard)	21
Chart (2022)	Position
US Christian Albums (Billboard)	49

== Release history ==
Release history and formats for Chris Tomlin & Friends
Region	Date	Format(s)	Label(s)	Ref.
Various	July 31, 2020	Digital download; streaming	Sparrow Records; Capitol Christian Music Group	
Various	August 28, 2020	CD	Sparrow Records; Capitol Christian Music Group	
