= Life Rolls On =

Studio album by Florida Georgia Line
- Released: February 12, 2021
- Genre: Country
- Length: 43:41
- Label: Nashville Harbor
- Producers: Corey Crowder; Tyler Hubbard; Brian Kelley; Jeff Gitelman; Priscilla Renea; Andrew DeRoberts; Jordan Schmidt

Florida Georgia Line chronology
6-Pack (2020)	Life Rolls On (2021)	Greatest Hits (2022)

Singles from Life Rolls On
- 1. "I Love My Country" Released: March 27, 2020; 2. "Long Live" Released: September 10, 2020; 3. "Lil Bit" Released: June 7, 2021

Life Rolls On is the fifth studio album by American country music duo Florida Georgia Line. It was released on February 12, 2021, through Nashville Harbor Records & Entertainment. It includes the hit singles "I Love My Country" and "Long Live", as well the material from their 6-Pack EP. The album marks their only full-length release with producer Corey Crowder, a departure from their previous work with longtime producer Joey Moi.

== Background ==
Florida Georgia Line appeared on the May 18 episode of Songland. Two days later, on May 20, 2020, they released the 6-Pack EP, which included the song Second Guessing, which had won the Songland episode. All six songs from the EP are included on Life Rolls On. On December 4, 2020, the album and its release date were announced in a tweet.

== Touring ==
While a tour for the album, the I Love My Country Tour, was planned, it was cancelled in August 2021, with the COVID-19 pandemic cited as the reason. However, Bob Lefsetz asserted in his newsletter that the actual reason was low ticket sales.

== Accolades ==
Life Rolls On was nominated for Top Country Album at the 2022 Billboard Music Awards.

== Track listing ==
Life Rolls On track listing
No.	Title	Writer(s)	Length
1.	"Long Live"	Tyler Hubbard; Brian Kelley; Corey Crowder; David Garcia; Josh Miller	2:33
2.	"Life Looks Good"	Hubbard; Kelley; Crowder; Jaren Johnston	2:47
3.	"Countryside"	Blake Redferrin; Jake Rose; Michael Whitworth	3:20
4.	"Always Gonna Love You"	Hubbard; Kelley; Crowder; Ross Copperman; Michael Hardy	2:57
5.	"I Love My Country"	Crowder; Ernest Keith Smith; Ryan Vojtesak; Kane Brown; Chase McGill; Will Weatherly	3:05
6.	"Hard to Get to Heaven"	Hubbard; Kelley; Crowder; Josh Thompson	3:11
7.	"Long Time Comin'"	Hubbard; Kelley; Jordan Schmidt; Canaan Smith	3:14
8.	"Interlude"	Hubbard; Kelley; Crowder	0:26
9.	"Ain't Worried Bout It" (album version)	Hubbard; Kelley; Crowder; Dallas Davidson; Ben Hayslip	2:31
10.	"Beer:30"	Hubbard; Kelley; Crowder; E. Smith; C. Smith	2:19
11.	"New Truck"	Hubbard; Kelley; Crowder; Redferrin; Jeff Gitelman; Raysean Harrison; Priscilla Renea	2:22
12.	"Eyes Closed"	Hubbard; Kelley; Crowder; Copperman; Hardy	2:29
13.	"Second Guessing" (from Songland)	Hubbard; Kelley; Crowder; Shane McAnally; Andrew DeRoberts; Benjamin Simonetti; Ester Dean; Geoff Warburton; Griffen Palmer; Ryan Tedder	3:07
14.	"Good to Me"	Hubbard; Kelley; Crowder; C. Smith	2:49
15.	"U.S. Stronger"	Hubbard; Kelley	3:03
16.	"Life Rolls On"	Ben Burgess; Alysa Vanderhym; Emily Weisband	3:21
Total length:			43:41

Deluxe (Digital/Streaming only)
No.	Title	Writer(s)	Length
17.	"Lil Bit" (FGL Remix) (with Nelly)	Hubbard; Redferrin; Cornell Haynes, Jr.; Jordan Schmidt	3:17

Video Deluxe (iTunes/Apple Music only)
No.	Title	Writer(s)	Length
17.	"I Love My Country" (music video)	Crowder; E. Smith; Vojtesak; Brown; McGill; Weatherly	3:16
18.	"I Love My Country" (lyric video)	Crowder; E. Smith; Vojtesak; Brown; McGill; Weatherly	3:06
19.	"Second Guessing" (music video)	Hubbard; Kelley; Crowder; McAnally; DeRoberts; Simonetti; Dean; Warburton; Palmer; Tedder	3:03
20.	"Second Guessing" (lyric video)	Hubbard; Kelley; Crowder; McAnally; DeRoberts; Simonetti; Dean; Warburton; Palmer; Tedder	3:08
21.	"Long Live" (lyric video)	Hubbard; Kelley; Crowder; Garcia; Miller	2:36
22.	"New Truck" (lyric video)	Hubbard; Kelley; Crowder; Redferrin; Gitelman; Harrison; Renea	2:41

== Personnel ==
Credits adapted from Tidal and the album's liner notes.

Florida Georgia Line

- Brian Kelley – vocals, producer (all tracks); background vocals (5)
- Tyler Hubbard – vocals, producer

Additional musicians

- David Garcia – acoustic guitar, programming (1)
- Ilya Toshinskiy – acoustic guitar (1, 4–7, 9, 10, 12), mandolin (1, 7), banjo (4, 5, 10)
- Todd Lombardo – banjo (1, 11, 14, 16), acoustic guitar (2, 11, 14–16), mandolin (2, 14, 15), electric guitar (15)
- Jimmie Lee Sloas – bass guitar (1, 4–7, 9, 10, 12)
- Jerry Roe – drums (1, 2, 4–7, 9, 10, 12, 14, 15), percussion (3, 5, 7, 10, 12)
- Derek Wells – electric guitar (1, 4–10, 12, 13), Dobro (13)
- Dave Cohen – Hammond B-3 organ (1, 3–5), synthesizer (1, 3, 4, 6, 9, 12), keyboards (4)
- Corey Crowder – programming (1–7, 9–16), synthesizer (1), background vocals (6)
- Jaren Johnston – background vocals, bass guitar, electric guitar (2)
- Katlin Owen – electric guitar (2, 14, 16)
- Alex Wright – Hammond B-3 organ (2, 7, 9, 13, 14), piano (2, 7, 9, 11, 13), synthesizer (2, 6–9, 11, 13, 14), keyboards (9, 16), programming (6, 7)
- Jake Rose – acoustic guitar, banjo, programming (3)
- Ross Copperman – programming (4, 12)
- Josh Thompson – background vocals (6)
- Jordan Schmidt – programming (7)
- Jeff Gitelman – programming (11)
- Andrew DeRoberts – guitar, programming (13)
- Tony Lucido – bass guitar (15)
- Tyler Chiarelli – electric guitar (15)
- Alysa Vanderheym – piano, programming, synthesizer (16)

Technical

- Corey Crowder – producer, editor, recording engineer
- Jeff Juliano – mixer
- Adam Ayan – mastering engineer
- Jake Rose – recording engineer (3)
- Jeff Gitelman – producer (11)
- Priscilla Renea – producer (11)
- Andrew DeRoberts – producer (13)
- Jordan Schmidt – producer (17)
- Joe Baldridge – recording engineer (4, 6, 7, 9, 10, 12)
- Jeff Balding – recording engineer (5)
- Ally Gecewicz – editor (1, 3–7, 9, 10, 12)
- Derek Wells – editor (1, 3–7, 9, 10, 12)
- Eivind Nordland – editor (1, 3–7, 9, 10, 12)
- Scott Cooke – editor (1, 3–7, 9, 10, 12)
- David Cook – editor (2–4, 6, 7, 11, 12, 14–16), assistant mixer (1–16)
- Josh Ditty – assistant recording engineer (1, 3, 4, 6, 7, 9, 10, 12)

== Charts ==
=== Weekly charts ===
Weekly chart performance for Life Rolls On
Chart (2021)	Peak position
Australian Albums (ARIA)	43
Australian Country Albums (ARIA)	4
Canadian Albums (Billboard)	18
US Billboard 200	21
US Top Country Albums (Billboard)	3

=== Year-end charts ===
Year-end chart performance for Life Rolls On
Chart (2021)	Position
US Billboard 200	147
US Top Country Albums (Billboard)	19

== Release history ==
Release history and formats for Life Rolls On
Country	Date	Format	Label	Ref.
Various	February 12, 2021	CD; digital download; streaming; vinyl	BMLG	
