= Keith Urban discography =

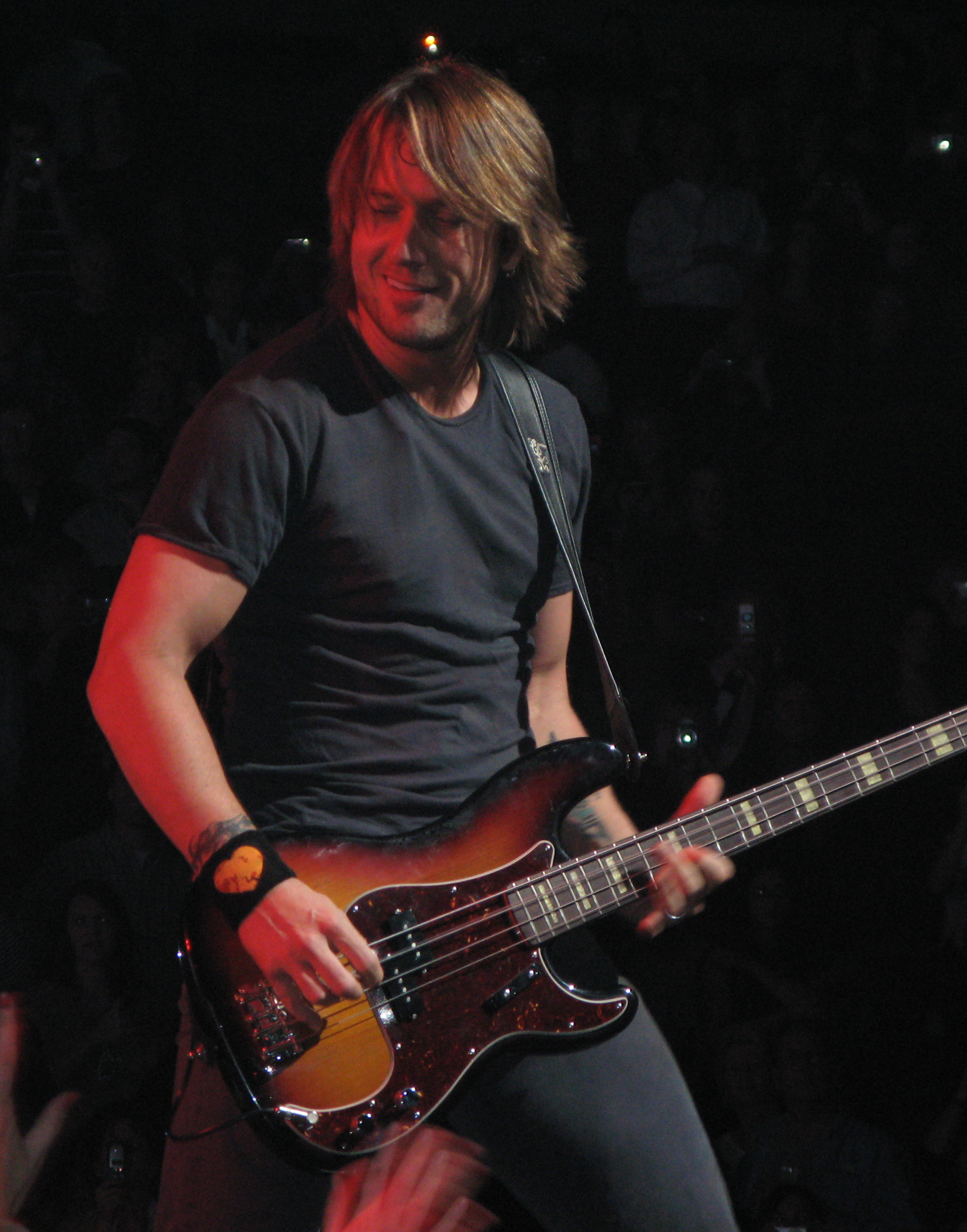
- Studio albums: 13
- Compilation albums: 4
- Singles: 57
- Music videos: 47
- Other charted songs: 11
- No. 1 singles (Billboard): 22
- No. 1 singles (overall): 30

Australian country music singer Keith Urban has released 13 studio albums, four compilation albums and 57 singles. He began his career in 1991 with the release of his self-titled album on EMI and Capitol Records in Australia. After an American album in 1997 as a member of The Ranch, he embarked on a solo career there as well, subsequently releasing three more studio albums. His highest-certified album in the US is 2004's Be Here, which is four-times-platinum by the RIAA.

Of his 48 solo singles, 41 were released to US and Canadian radio. He has scored 20 No. 1 singles on the US Hot Country Songs chart, plus his guest appearance on Brad Paisley's No. 1 single "Start a Band". "Once in a Lifetime" is his highest-debuting single on the US Hot Country Songs chart, entering at No. 17. "You'll Think of Me" and "Making Memories of Us" were also hits on the Adult Contemporary chart, and peaked at No. 2 and No. 5, respectively.

== Albums ==
=== Studio albums ===
Title	Album details	Peak chart positions										Sales	Certifications
Title	Album details	AUS	AUS Country	AUT	CAN	GER	NZ	SWI	UK	US	US Country	Sales	Certifications
Keith Urban (Note: Keith Urban peaked at number 27 on the RPM Country Albums/CDs chart.)	Release date: 19 October 1999; Label: Capitol Nashville	90	—	—	—	—	—	—	—	145	17		ARIA: Gold; RIAA: Platinum
Golden Road	Release date: 8 October 2002; Label: Capitol Nashville	29	—	—	—	—	—	—	—	11	2		ARIA: Platinum; MC: 2× Platinum; RIAA: 3× Platinum
Be Here	Release date: 21 September 2004; Label: Capitol Nashville	11	—	—	8	—	—	—	—	3	1		ARIA: 3× Platinum; MC: 2× Platinum; RIAA: 4× Platinum
Love, Pain & the Whole Crazy Thing	Release date: 7 November 2006; Label: Capitol Nashville	5	—	23	2	32	—	52	73	3	1		ARIA: Platinum; MC: Platinum; RIAA: Platinum
Defying Gravity	Release date: 31 March 2009; Label: Capitol Nashville	3	—	—	4	—	—	—	—	1	1	US: 879,000	ARIA: Platinum; MC: Platinum; RIAA: Platinum
Get Closer	Release date: 16 November 2010; Label: Capitol Nashville / Hit Red	11	2	—	8	—	—	—	—	7	2	US: 743,000	ARIA: Platinum; MC: Gold; RIAA: Platinum
Fuse	Release date: 10 September 2013; Label: Capitol Nashville / Hit Red	1	1	—	1	—	28	—	—	1	1		ARIA: Platinum; MC: Gold; RIAA: Platinum
Ripcord	Release date: 6 May 2016; Label: Capitol Nashville / Hit Red	1	1	—	3	—	15	—	—	4	1	US: 740,700	ARIA: 2× Platinum; MC: Platinum; RIAA: Platinum
Graffiti U	Release date: 27 April 2018; Label: Capitol Nashville / Hit Red	2	1	—	1	—	32	—	—	2	1	US: 282,400	ARIA: Gold; RIAA: Gold
The Speed of Now Part 1	Release date: 18 September 2020; Label: Capitol Nashville / Hit Red	1	1	—	5	56	27	37	24	7	1		ARIA: Gold; MC: Gold; RIAA: Gold
High	Release date: 20 September 2024; Label: Capitol Nashville / Hit Red	3	1	—	71	—	—	—	—	38	10		
Flow State	Release date: 12 June 2026; Label: MCA Nashville / Hit Red	5	1	—	—	—	—	89	—	57	12		
"—" denotes a recording that did not chart or was not released in that territory.

=== Other albums ===
List of other albums
Title	Album details	Peak chart positions	
Title	Album details	AUS	US Country
Keith Urban	Released: 23 September 1991; Label: EMI	98	—
The Ranch (Note: The Ranch was re-released in 2004 under the title Keith Urban in the Ranch; chart position is for re-issue.)	Released: 22 April 1997; Label: Capitol Nashville	82	34

=== Compilation albums ===
Title	Album details	Peak chart positions									Certifications
Title	Album details	AUS	AUS Country	CAN	GER	IRE	NZ	UK	US	US Country	Certifications
Days Go By	Release date: 30 May 2005; Label: Capitol Nashville	—	—	—	58	7	—	40	—	—	BPI: Silver
Greatest Hits: 18 Kids (Note: Re-released on 19 August 2008 as Greatest Hits: 19 Kids with one track added.)	Release date: 20 November 2007; Label: Capitol Nashville	7	2	10	—	—	—	—	11	4	ARIA: 3× Platinum; BPI: Silver; MC: Platinum; RIAA: Platinum
iTunes Originals	Release date: 21 July 2009; Label: Capitol Nashville	—	—	—	—	—	—	—	153	23	
The Story So Far	Release date: 11 May 2012; Label: EMI Australia	1	1	—	—	—	26	—	—	—	ARIA: 3× Platinum
"—" denotes a recording that did not chart or was not released in that territory.

=== Live albums ===
Title	Album details	Peak chart positions
Title	Album details	AUS Country
High and (A)live	Release date: 12 December 2025; Label: Hit Red; Capitol Nashville	35

== Singles ==
=== 1990s ===
Title	Year	Peak chart positions				Album
Title	Year	AUS	CAN Country	US	US Country	Album
"I Never Work on a Sunday" (Note: Released in Australia only.)	1990	—	—	—	—	Keith Urban (1991)
"Only You"	1991	101	—	—	—	Keith Urban (1991)
"Got It Bad"	1991	155	—	—	—	Keith Urban (1991)
"It's a Love Thing"	1999	—	25	— (Note: "It's a Love Thing" did not enter the Billboard Hot 100, but peaked at number 5 on the Bubbling Under Hot 100 Singles chart.)	18	Keith Urban (1999)
"—" denotes a recording that did not chart or was not released in that territory.

=== 2000s ===
Title	Year	Peak chart positions										Certifications	Album
Title	Year	AUS	CAN	CAN Country	GER	NLD	UK	US	US Country	US AC	US Adult	Certifications	Album
"Your Everything"	2000	—	—	20	—	—	—	51	4	—	—		Keith Urban (1999)
"But for the Grace of God"	2000	—	—	x	—	—	—	37	1	—	—		Keith Urban (1999)
"Where the Blacktop Ends"	2001	—	—	x	—	—	—	35	3	—	—		Keith Urban (1999)
"Somebody Like You"	2002	—	3	x	42	—	—	23	1	—	—	ARIA: 4× Platinum; BPI: Silver; RIAA: 3× Platinum; RMNZ: Platinum	Golden Road
"Raining on Sunday"	2003	79	—	x	—	—	—	38	3	—	—		Golden Road
"Who Wouldn't Wanna Be Me"	2003	—	—	x	—	—	—	30	1	—	—	RIAA: Gold	Golden Road
"You'll Think of Me"	2004	—	—	2	—	—	88	24	1	2	6	ARIA: Platinum; RIAA: 2× Platinum	Golden Road
"Days Go By"	2004	56	—	1	—	99	—	31	1	—	—	ARIA: 2× Platinum; RIAA: Platinum	Be Here
"You're My Better Half"	2004	34	—	2	—	—	—	33	2	—	—	ARIA: Gold; RIAA: Gold	Be Here
"Making Memories of Us"	2005	54	—	1	—	—	—	34	1	5	22	ARIA: Platinum; RIAA: Platinum	Be Here
"Better Life"	2005	—	—	1	—	—	—	44	1	—	—	RIAA: Gold	Be Here
"Tonight I Wanna Cry" (Note: "Tonight I Wanna Cry" didn't chart in Australia until September 2011 after it entered the charts following a performance by a contestant on The X Factor Australia.)	2005	72	—	2	—	—	—	36	2	—	—	ARIA: Gold; RIAA: Platinum	Be Here
"These Are the Days" (Note: "These Are the Days" was released before "Tonight I Wanna Cry" in Australia.)	2006	—	—	—	—	—	—	—	—	—	—		Be Here
"Once in a Lifetime"	2006	18	—	1	66	—	194	31	6	26	—	ARIA: Gold; RIAA: Gold	Love, Pain & the Whole Crazy Thing
"Stupid Boy"	2006	— (Note: "Stupid Boy" did not enter the ARIA top 100, but peaked at number 7 on the Australia Digital Song Sales chart.)	—	1	—	—	—	43	3	—	—	ARIA: Gold; RIAA: Platinum	Love, Pain & the Whole Crazy Thing
"I Told You So"	2007	—	56	1	—	—	—	48	2	—	—	RIAA: Gold	Love, Pain & the Whole Crazy Thing
"Everybody"	2007	—	71	2	—	—	—	64	5	—	—		Love, Pain & the Whole Crazy Thing
"Used to the Pain" (Note: "Used to the Pain" was released as a single only in Germany.)	2007	—	—	—	—	—	—	—	—	—	—		Love, Pain & the Whole Crazy Thing
"You Look Good in My Shirt" (Note: "You Look Good in My Shirt" was originally included on Golden Road and charted from unsolicited airplay at No. 60 in 2004 when it was planned as the album's fifth single; it was re-recorded as a bonus track for Greatest Hits: 19 Kids and released to radio in 2008.)	2008	—	54	1	—	—	—	44	1	—	—	ARIA: Gold; RIAA: Gold	Greatest Hits: 19 Kids
"Sweet Thing"	2008	96	45	1	—	—	—	30	1	—	—	RIAA: Platinum	Defying Gravity
"Kiss a Girl"	2009	87	34	1	—	—	—	16	3	11	40	ARIA: Platinum; RIAA: Platinum	Defying Gravity
"Only You Can Love Me This Way"	2009	—	49	1	—	—	—	34	1	—	—	ARIA: Gold; RIAA: Platinum	Defying Gravity
"'Til Summer Comes Around"	2009	—	74	1	—	—	—	58	3	—	—	RIAA: Gold	Defying Gravity
"—" denotes a recording that did not chart or was not released in that territory. "x" denotes a recording where the peak position cannot be verified or no relevant chart existed.

=== 2010s ===
Title	Year	Peak chart positions									Sales	Certifications	Album
Title	Year	AUS	CAN	CAN Country	CAN AC	NZ	US	US Country	US Country Airplay	US AC	Sales	Certifications	Album
"I'm In"	2010	—	63	1	—	—	60	2		—			Defying Gravity
"Put You in a Song"	2010	—	49	2	—	—	53	2		—		RIAA: Gold	Get Closer
"Without You"	2011	39	69	2	—	—	52	1		—		ARIA: Gold; RIAA: Gold	Get Closer
"Long Hot Summer" (Note: "Long Hot Summer" was released in Australia as the first single from Get Closer in October 2010. It wasn't released as a single in North America until 27 June 2011.)	2011	82	35	1	—	—	45	1		—		ARIA: Platinum; RIAA: Platinum	Get Closer
"You Gonna Fly"	2011	—	66	1	—	—	54	1		—		RIAA: Gold	Get Closer
"For You"	2012	—	84	12	—	—	55	6		—		RIAA: Gold	Act of Valor: The Album
"Little Bit of Everything"	2013	40	35	1	—	—	33	6	1	—	US: 561,000	ARIA: Gold; RIAA: Gold	Fuse
"Shame" (Note: "Shame" was released in Australia and New Zealand only as the second single from Fuse in August 2013.)	2013	35	—	—	—	32	—	—	—	—			Fuse
"We Were Us" (with Miranda Lambert)	2013	—	25	2	—	—	26	1	1	—	US: 566,000	ARIA: Gold; MC: Gold; RIAA: Platinum	Fuse
"Cop Car"	2014	—	38	5	—	—	41	4	8	—	US: 772,000	ARIA: Gold; RIAA: 2× Platinum	Fuse
"Somewhere in My Car"	2014	—	32	4	—	—	49	3	1	—	US: 450,000	RIAA: Platinum	Fuse
"Raise 'Em Up" (featuring Eric Church)	2015	—	47	1	—	—	56	8	1	—	US: 250,000	RIAA: Gold	Fuse
"John Cougar, John Deere, John 3:16"	2015	—	35	1	—	—	40	2	2	—	US: 663,000	ARIA: Gold; MC: Platinum; RIAA: 2× Platinum	Ripcord
"Break on Me"	2015	106	61	1	—	—	54	6	1	—	US: 265,000	RIAA: Gold	Ripcord
"Wasted Time"	2016	72	40	1	5	—	51	4	1	—	US: 269,000	ARIA: Platinum; MC: Gold; RIAA: Platinum	Ripcord
"Blue Ain't Your Color"	2016	—	40	1	—	—	24	1	1	14	US: 1,183,000	ARIA: 2× Platinum; MC: Platinum; RIAA: 5× Platinum; RMNZ: Platinum	Ripcord
"The Fighter" (featuring Carrie Underwood)	2017	19	65	2	28	—	38	2	2	13	US: 888,000	ARIA: 4× Platinum; MC: Platinum; RIAA: 3× Platinum; RMNZ: Gold	Ripcord
"Female"	2017	55	71	3	—	—	69	11	12	—	US: 163,000	ARIA: Gold; RIAA: Gold	Graffiti U
"Parallel Line" (Note: "Parallel Line" was released as a single in Australia and the United Kingdom only.)	2018	47	— (Note: "Parallel Line" did not enter the Billboard Canadian Hot 100, but peaked at number 10 on the Hot Canadian Digital Song Sales chart.)	—	—	—	— (Note: "Parallel Line" did not enter the Billboard Hot 100, but peaked at number 19 on the Bubbling Under Hot 100 Singles chart.)	25	—	—		ARIA: 2× Platinum; RIAA: Gold; RMNZ: Gold	Graffiti U
"Coming Home" (featuring Julia Michaels)	2018	84	84	1	—	—	50	11	3	—	US: 113,000	ARIA: Gold; RIAA: Gold	Graffiti U
"Never Comin Down"	2018	—	—	10	—	—	—	30	18	—			Graffiti U
"We Were"	2019	— (Note: "We Were" did not enter the ARIA Singles Chart, but peaked at number 35 on the ARIA Digital Track Chart.)	— (Note: "We Were" did not enter the Billboard Canadian Hot 100, but peaked at number 26 on the Hot Canadian Digital Song Sales chart.)	1	—	—	65	7	4	—	US: 65,000	RIAA: Gold	The Speed of Now Part 1
"—" denotes a recording that did not chart or was not released in that territory.

=== 2020s ===
Title	Year	Peak chart positions										Sales	Certifications	Album
Title	Year	AUS	AUS Country	CAN	CAN Country	NLD	UK	US	US Country	US Country Airplay	US Adult	Sales	Certifications	Album
"God Whispered Your Name"	2020	—	10	65	2	—	—	60	13	8	—	US: 2,000	MC: Gold; RIAA: Gold	The Speed of Now Part 1
"Polaroid" (Note: "Polaroid" was only released as a single in Australia and the United Kingdom.)	2020	—	2	— (Note: "Polaroid" did not enter the Billboard Canadian Hot 100, but peaked at number 33 on the Hot Canadian Digital Song Sales chart.)	—	—	—	—	—	—	—			The Speed of Now Part 1
"Superman" (Note: "Superman" was only released as a single in Australia, the United Kingdom, Sweden, Norway, and New Zealand.)	2020	—	10	— (Note: "Superman" did not enter the Billboard Canadian Hot 100, but peaked at number 16 on the Hot Canadian Digital Song Sales chart.)	—	—	—	—	— (Note: "Superman" did not enter the Hot Country Songs chart, but peaked at number 6 on the Country Digital Song Sales chart.)	—	—			The Speed of Now Part 1
"Change Your Mind" (Note: "Change Your Mind" was only released as a single in Australia.)	2020	—	30	—	—	—	—	—	—	—	—			The Speed of Now Part 1
"One Too Many" (with Pink)	2020	6	1	22	1	28	40	52	10	10	25		ARIA: 5× Platinum; BPI: Gold; MC: Platinum; RIAA: Platinum; RMNZ: 2× Platinum	The Speed of Now Part 1
"Out the Cage" (Note: "Out the Cage" was only released as a single in Australia and New Zealand.) (featuring Breland and Nile Rodgers)	2021	—	—	—	—	—	—	—	—	—	—			The Speed of Now Part 1
"Wild Hearts"	2021	— (Note: "Wild Hearts" did not enter the ARIA top 100, but peaked at number 7 on the Australia Digital Song Sales chart.)	1	59	1	—	—	97	19	4	—		ARIA: Gold	Non-album singles
"Nightfalls" (Note: "Nightfalls" has only been released as a single in Australia, Canada, New Zealand, Sweden and the United Kingdom.)	2022	—	3	— (Note: "Nightfalls" did not enter the Billboard Canadian Hot 100, but peaked at number 44 on the Hot Canadian Digital Song Sales chart.)	25	—	—	—	—	—	—			Non-album singles
"Brown Eyes Baby"	2022	—	1	— (Note: "Brown Eyes Baby" did not enter the Billboard Canadian Hot 100, but peaked at number 24 on the Hot Canadian Digital Song Sales chart.)	7	—	—	— (Note: "Brown Eyes Baby" did not enter the Billboard Hot 100, but peaked at number 10 on the Bubbling Under Hot 100 Singles chart.)	31	11	—		RIAA: Gold	Non-album singles
"Street Called Main" (Note: "Street Called Main" has only been released as a single in Australia.)	2022	—	3	— (Note: "Street Called Main" did not enter the Billboard Canadian Hot 100, but peaked at number 33 on the Hot Canadian Digital Song Sales chart.)	—	—	—	—	— (Note: "Street Called Main" did not enter the Hot Country Songs chart, but peaked at number 22 on the Country Digital Song Sales chart.)	—	—			Non-album singles
"Straight Line"	2024	—	5	—	22	—	—	—	—	18	—			High
"Messed Up as Me"	2024	—	11	— (Note: "Messed Up as Me" did not enter the Billboard Canadian Hot 100, but peaked at number 17 on the Hot Canadian Digital Song Sales chart.)	27	—	—	— (Note: "Messed Up as Me" did not enter the Billboard Hot 100, but peaked at number three on the Bubbling Under Hot 100 Singles chart.)	24	12	—			High
"Go Home W U" (Note: "Go Home W U" has only been released as a single in Australia.) (with Lainey Wilson)	2024	—	1	— (Note: "Go Home W U" did not enter the Billboard Canadian Hot 100, but peaked at number 21 on the Hot Canadian Digital Song Sales chart.)	—	—	—	—	— (Note: "Go Home W U" did not enter the Hot Country Songs chart, but peaked at number 7 on the Country Digital Song Sales chart.)	—	—			High
"Wildside" (Note: "Wildside" has only been released as a single in Australia and the United Kingdom.)	2024	—	38	—	—	—	—	—	—	—	—			High
"Heart Like a Hometown"	2025	—	17	—	—	—	—	—	—	—	—			High
"Chuck Taylors"	2025	—	2	—	—	—	—	—	—	—	—			High
"We Go Back" (featuring Michael McDonald)	2026	—	—	—	—	—	—	—	—	—	—			Flow State
"Summer Breeze"	2026	—	—	—	55	—	—	—	—	—	—			Flow State
"—" denotes a recording that did not chart or was not released in that territory.

=== As featured artist ===
Title	Year	Peak chart positions									Certifications	Album
Title	Year	AUS	CAN	CAN Country	CAN AC	UK	US	US Country	US Country Airplay	US AC	Certifications	Album
"America the Beautiful" (with various artists)	2001	—	—	—	—	—	—	58		—		non-album single
"The Twelfth of Never" (with Dolly Parton)	2005	—	—	—	—	—	—	—	—	—		Those Were the Days
"Funky Tonight" (with The John Butler Trio)	2007	11	—	—	—	—	—	—	—	—		non-album singles
"In God's Hands" (Note: "In God's Hands" was originally released as a solo single by Nelly Furtado from her album Loose in 2007; it was re-recorded with Urban and re-released to North America in 2008.) (with Nelly Furtado)	2008	66	11	—	3	—	—	—	—	15		non-album singles
"Start a Band" (with Brad Paisley)	2008	—	51	1	—	—	55	1			—	Play: The Guitar Album
"Blue Sky" (with Emily West)	2010	—	97	—	—	—	— (Note: "Blue Sky" did not enter the Billboard Hot 100, but peaked at number 4 on the Bubbling Under Hot 100 Singles chart.)	38		—		non-album single
"Lean on Me" (with Sheryl Crow and Kid Rock)	2010	—	11	—	—	142	47	—	—	—		Hope for Haiti Now
"Forever Country" (Artists of Then, Now & Forever)	2016	26	25	34	—	—	21	1	31	—		non-album single
"If I Were You" (with Jillian Jacqueline)	2018	—	—	—	—	—	—	—	—	—		Side A
"Be a Light" (with Thomas Rhett, Reba McEntire, Hillary Scott & Chris Tomlin)	2020	—	74	3	—	—	42	7	2	—	RIAA: Platinum	non-album singles
"Both Still Young" (with Dzeko)	2020	64	— (Note: "Both Still Young" did not enter the Billboard Canadian Hot 100, but peaked at number 50 on the Hot Canadian Digital Song Sales chart.)	—	—	—	—	—	—	—		non-album singles
"Love Songs Ain't for Us" (Amy Shark featuring Keith Urban)	2021	22	—	—	—	—	—	—	—	—	ARIA: Platinum	Cry Forever
"Throw It Back" (Breland featuring Keith Urban)	2021	—	— (Note: "Throw It Back" did not enter the Billboard Canadian Hot 100, but peaked at number 42 on the Hot Canadian Digital Song Sales chart.)	—	—	—	—	38	—	—	RIAA: Gold	Cross Country
"Shape of Me" (with Rita Ora)	2024	—	—	—	—	—	—	—	—	—		You & I
"Write One" (with Karley Scott Collins)	2024	—	—	—	—	—	—	—	—	—		Write One (EP)
"—" denotes a recording that did not chart or was not released in that territory.

== Other charted songs ==
Title	Year	Peak chart positions					Certifications	Album
Title	Year	AUS	CAN	US	US Country	US Country Digital	Certifications	Album
"You Look Good in My Shirt"	2004	—	—	—	60	—		Golden Road
"Live to Love Another Day"	2005	—	—	—	48	—		Be Here
"Hit the Ground Runnin'"	2009	—	—	— (Note: "Hit the Ground Runnin'" did not enter the Billboard Hot 100, but peaked at number 10 on the Bubbling Under Hot 100 Singles chart.)	—	—		Defying Gravity
"If Ever I Could Love"	2009	—	—	— (Note: "If Ever I Could Find Love" did not enter the Billboard Hot 100, but peaked at number 16 on the Bubbling Under Hot 100 Singles chart.)	—	—		Defying Gravity
"All for You"	2012	91	—	—	—	—		Get Closer
"Even the Stars Fall 4 U"	2013	—	98	—	49	31		Fuse
"Good Thing"	2014	—	—	—	50	—		Fuse
"Sun Don't Let Me Down" (featuring Nile Rodgers and Pitbull)	2016	—	—	—	—	47		Ripcord
"That Could Still Be Us"	2016	—	—	—	—	48		Ripcord
"Burden"	2019	— (Note: "Burden" did not enter the ARIA Singles Chart, but peaked at number 35 on the ARIA Digital Track Chart.)	— (Note: "Burden" did not enter the Billboard Canadian Hot 100, but peaked at number 39 on the Hot Canadian Digital Song Sales chart.)	—	38	9		Non-album singles
"I'll Be Your Santa Tonight"	2019	— (Note: "I'll Be Your Santa Tonight" did not enter the ARIA Singles Chart, but peaked at number 30 on the ARIA Digital Track Chart.)	— (Note: "I'll Be Your Santa Tonight" did not enter the Billboard Canadian Hot 100, but peaked at number 13 on the Hot Canadian Digital Song Sales chart.)	—	32	6		Non-album singles
"That's When" (Taylor Swift featuring Keith Urban)	2021	81	63	— (Note: "That's When" did not enter the Billboard Hot 100, but peaked at number three on the Bubbling Under Hot 100 Singles chart.)	30	23		Fearless (Taylor's Version)
"—" denotes a recording that did not chart or was not released in that territory.

== Other appearances ==
Title	Year	Artist	Album
"Some Days You Gotta Dance"	1999	The Chicks	Fly
"If You Try to Save This Marriage Again"	1999	Tim Wilson	Gettin' My Mind Right
"Ride"	2000	Sons of the Desert	Change
"Sunburned Country"	2002	Olivia Newton-John	2
"Die of a Broken Heart"	2004	Carolyn Dawn Johnson	Dress Rehearsal
"Leavin'"	2004	Paul Brandt	This Time Around
"When You're Gone"	2004	Richard Marx	My Own Best Enemy
"One Thing Left"	2004	Richard Marx	My Own Best Enemy
"The Weight of Love"	2005	LeAnn Rimes	This Woman
"Gitarzan"	2007	Cledus T. Judd (with Heidi Newfield)	Boogity, Boogity – A Tribute to the Comedic Genius of Ray Stevens
"Let the Wind Chase You"	2007	Trisha Yearwood	Heaven, Heartache and the Power of Love
"Tryin' to Find a Reason"	2007	Martina McBride	Waking Up Laughing
"The Bees"	2008	Lee Ann Womack	Call Me Crazy
"The Water Is Wide"	2008	Rhonda Vincent	Good Thing Going
"Imagine That"	2012	Don Williams	And So It Goes
"Highway Don't Care"	2013	Tim McGraw and Taylor Swift	Two Lanes of Freedom
"Almost Saturday Night"	2013	John Fogerty	Wrote a Song for Everyone
"One Day Away"	2013	Buddy Guy	Rhythm & Blues
"She's Like"	2014	Colt Ford	Thanks for Listening
"Good Times"	2014	Jimmy Barnes	30:30 Hindsight
"Broke"	2015	Jason Derulo and Stevie Wonder	Everything Is 4
"Diamond"	2016	Martina McBride	Reckless
"If We Had a Child"	2017	Kasey Chambers	Dragonfly
"No Place Like Hometown"	2019	Hardy	Hixtape, Vol. 1
"Kids"	2019	Sam Williams	Glasshouse Children
"I've Gotta Get a Message to You"	2021	Barry Gibb	Greenfields
"Don't Want To"	2024	Jelly Roll	Beautifully Broken (Pickin' Up the Pieces)
"Diablo"	2026	Deep Purple	Splat!

== Videography ==
=== Video albums ===
Title	Year	US Video	Certifications
Video Hits	2004	—	RIAA: Platinum; MC: Gold
Livin' Right Now	2005	3	RIAA: 2× Platinum; ARIA: 5× Platinum; MC: 2× Platinum
Love, Pain & the Whole Crazy World Tour	2008	2	ARIA: 2× Platinum; MC: Platinum

=== Music videos ===
Title	Year	Director
"Only You"	1990	
"It's a Love Thing"	1999	Thom Oliphant
"Your Everything"	2000	Trey Fanjoy
"But for the Grace of God"	2000	Trey Fanjoy
"Where the Blacktop Ends"	2001	Peter Zavadil
"America the Beautiful" (Various)	2001	Marc Ball
"Somebody Like You"	2002	Trey Fanjoy
"Raining on Sunday"	2003	Trey Fanjoy
"Who Wouldn't Wanna Be Me"	2003	Sam Erickson
"You'll Think of Me"	2004	Sam Erickson
"Days Go By"	2004	Wayne Isham
"You're My Better Half"	2004	Trey Fanjoy
"Making Memories of Us"	2005	Chris Hicky
"Better Life"	2005	Chris Hicky
"Tonight I Wanna Cry"	2006	Chris Hicky
"Once in a Lifetime"	2006	Chris Hicky
"Stupid Boy"	2006	Chris Hicky
"I Told You So"	2007	Charles Mehling
"Everybody"	2007	Chris Hicky
"You Look Good in My Shirt"	2008	Chris Hicky
"Start a Band" (with Brad Paisley)	2008	Jim Shea
"Sweet Thing"	2009	Trey Fanjoy
"Kiss a Girl" (promotional video)	2009	Chris Hicky
"Kiss a Girl"	2009	Chris Hicky
"Only You Can Love Me This Way"	2009	Chris Hicky
"Hit the Ground Runnin'"	2009	Jeff Johnson
"'Til Summer Comes Around"	2010	Noble Jones
"Put You in a Song"	2010	Brad Belanger
"Without You"	2011	Chris Hicky
"Long Hot Summer"	2011	Trey Fanjoy
"You Gonna Fly"	2012	Brad Belanger
"For You"	2012	Scott Waugh
"Imagine That" (with Don Williams)	2012	David McClister
"Highway Don't Care" (with Tim McGraw and Taylor Swift)	2013	Shane Drake
"Little Bit of Everything"	2013	Isaac Ravishankara
"We Were Us" (with Miranda Lambert)	2013	Reid Long
"Cop Car"	2014	John Urbano
"Somewhere in My Car"	2014	John Urbano
"Raise 'Em Up" (with Eric Church)	2015	Chris Hicky
"Come Back to Me"	2015	Chris Hicky
"John Cougar, John Deere, John 3:16"	2015	Shane Drake
"Wasted Time"	2016	John Urbano
"Blue Ain't Your Color"	2016	Carter Smith
"Forever Country" (Artists of Then, Now & Forever)	2016	Joseph Kahn
"The Fighter" (with Carrie Underwood)	2017	John Urbano
"Coming Home" (with Julia Michaels)	2018	Andy Hines
"Never Comin Down"	2018	Carter Smith
"We Were"	2019	
"I'll Be Your Santa Tonight"	2019	Chris Hicky
"God Whispered Your Name"	2020	Jennifer Massaux
"Polaroid"	2020	Dano Cerny
"Superman"	2020	Ben Dalgleish
"One Too Many" (with P!nk)	2020	
"Out the Cage" (with Breland and Nile Rodgers)	2021	
"Throw It Back" (with Breland)	2021	Bobby Bruderle
"Wild Hearts"	2022	
"Street Called Main"	2022	Justin Key

== See also ==
- The Ranch
