= The Speed of Now World Tour =

2022 concert tour by Keith Urban

- Tour by Keith Urban
- Promotional poster
- Location: Europe; North America; Australia
- Associated album: The Speed of Now Part 1
- Start date: 28 April 2022
- End date: 17 December 2022
- Legs: 3
- No. of shows: 13 in Europe; 56 in North America; 11 in Australia; 80 total

Keith Urban concert chronology
- Graffiti U World Tour (2018–2019); The Speed of Now World Tour (2022); High and Alive World Tour (2025)

The Speed of Now World Tour was the thirteenth headlining concert tour by New Zealand-born Australian country music artist Keith Urban. The tour is in support of his eleventh studio album, The Speed of Now Part 1 (2020). It began on 28 April 2022, in Birmingham, England and concluded on 17 December 2022 in Melbourne, Australia.

== Background ==
The tour was first announced in December 2021. He will first take the tour to Europe followed by North America, and then finish out the year in his homeland of Australia.

=== Show synopsis ===
The show begins with Urban's 2004 hit "Days Go By". The two hour set includes Urban playing his greatest hits, his latest singles, "Wild Hearts" and "Nightfalls". While performing "One Too Many", his 2020 collaboration with American singer, P!nk, a giant projection of her is shown on the video screens. He finishes the show with "Stupid Boy".

== Critical reception ==
Laura Cooney of Entertainment Focus, attended the 6 May London show and was all positive and praised his versatility. Cooney also said, "Even after 20 years in the business, it's clear Keith Urban is an artist at the top of his game and has a really strong sense of love for the UK audience – and that feel is mutual. He put together a masterclass of a show featuring all his top tracks, showing off his incredible skills as a guitar player and tremendous crowd engagement throughout, which all made for a fantastic night out." Khyle Medany from the Purple Revolver gave the Manchester show a 4.5 out of 5 rating. He said, "The O2 Apollo was Keith's stage on this night, for an intimate yet powerful, moving night of grooves, country jams and plentiful hits."

== Opening acts ==
- Ingrid Andress (North America)
- Tyler Hubbard

== Setlist ==
This setlist is a representation of the 6 May 2022, London show.

1. "Days Go By"
2. "Wild Hearts"
3. "The Fighter"
4. "Long Hot Summer"
5. "Parallel Line"
6. "Never Comin' Down"
7. "Somewhere in My Car"
8. "Nightfalls"
9. "John Cougar, John Deere, John 3:16"
10. "Superman"
11. "God Whispered Your Name"
12. "One Too Many"
13. "Easy on Me" (Adele cover)
14. "You'll Think of Me"
15. "Somebody Like You"
16. "The Lion Sleeps Tonight" (The Tokens cover)
17. "Blue Ain't Your Color"
18. "The Fighter"

Encore

19. "Wasted Time"
20. "Stupid Boy"

== Tour dates ==
| Date | City | Country | Venue | Opening acts | Attendance | Revenue |
Europe
| 28 April 2022 | Birmingham | England | O_{2} Birmingham | — | — | — |
| 1 May 2022 | Newcastle upon Tyne | England | O_{2} City Hall Newcastle | — | — | — |
| 3 May 2022 | Manchester | England | O_{2} Apollo Manchester | — | — | — |
| 4 May 2022 | Bournemouth | England | Bournemouth International Centre | — | – | – |
| 6 May 2022 | London | England | Hammersmith Apollo | — | — | — |
| 7 May 2022 | London | England | Hammersmith Apollo | — | — | — |
| 9 May 2022 | Edinburgh | Scotland | Edinburgh Playhouse | — | – | – |
| 17 May 2022 | Düsseldorf | Germany | Mitsubishi Electric Halle | — | – | – |
| 18 May 2022 | Munich | Germany | Zenith | — | – | – |
| 19 May 2022 | Frankfurt | Germany | Jahrhunderthalle | — | – | – |
| 21 May 2022 | Berlin | Germany | Verti Music Hall | — | – | – |
| 22 May 2022 | Rotterdam | Netherlands | RTM Stage | — | – | – |
| 24 May 2022 | Hamburg | Germany | Barclaycard Arena | — | – | – |
North America
| 27 May 2022 | Las Vegas | United States | The Colosseum at Caesars Palace | — | — | — |
| 28 May 2022 | Las Vegas | United States | The Colosseum at Caesars Palace | — | — | — |
| 29 May 2022 | Las Vegas | United States | The Colosseum at Caesars Palace | — | — | — |
| 17 June 2022 | West Palm Beach | United States | iTHINK Financial Amphitheatre | Ingrid Andress | — | – |
| 8 July 2022 | Toronto | Canada | Budweiser Stage | Ingrid Andress | – | – |
| 9 July 2022 | Toronto | Canada | Budweiser Stage | Ingrid Andress | – | – |
| 10 July 2022 | Hopwell | United States | CMAC | Ingrid Andress | — | — |
| 15 July 2022 | Cuyahoga Falls | United States | Blossom Music Center | Ingrid Andress | – | – |
| 16 July 2022 | Cincinnati | United States | Riverbend Music Center | Ingrid Andress | – | – |
| 22 July 2022 | Mansfield | United States | Xfinity Center | Ingrid Andress | – | – |
| 23 July 2022 | Bangor | United States | Maine Savings Amphitheater | Ingrid Andress | – | – |
| 24 July 2022 | Gilford | United States | Bank of New Hampshire Pavilion | Ingrid Andress | – | – |
| 29 July 2022 | Holmdel | United States | PNC Bank Arts Center | Ingrid Andress | – | – |
| 30 July 2022 | Bristow | United States | Jiffy Lube Live | Ingrid Andress | – | – |
| 31 July 2022 | Camden | United States | Freedom Mortgage Pavilion | Ingrid Andress | – | – |
| 4 August 2022 | Jacksonville | United States | Daily's Place | Ingrid Andress | – | – |
| 5 August 2022 | Jacksonville | United States | Daily's Place | Ingrid Andress | – | – |
| 6 August 2022 | Orange Beach | United States | The Wharf Amphitheater | Ingrid Andress | – | – |
| 12 August 2022 | Charlotte | United States | PNC Music Pavilion | Ingrid Andress | – | – |
| 13 August 2022 | Raleigh | United States | Coastal Credit Union Music Park | Ingrid Andress | – | – |
| 14 August 2022 | Virginia Beach | United States | Veterans United Home Loans Amphitheater | Ingrid Andress | – | – |
| 18 August 2022 | Rogers | United States | Walmart Arkansas Music Pavilion | Ingrid Andress | – | – |
| 19 August 2022 | Maryland Heights | United States | Hollywood Casino Amphitheatre | Ingrid Andress | – | – |
| 20 August 2022 | Des Moines | United States | Iowa State Fair | Ingrid Andress | – | – |
| 26 August 2022 | Clarkston | United States | Pine Knob Music Theatre | Ingrid Andress | – | – |
| 27 August 2022 | Noblesville | United States | Ruoff Music Center | Ingrid Andress | – | – |
| 28 August 2022 | Milwaukee | United States | American Family Insurance Amphitheater | Ingrid Andress | – | – |
| 1 September 2022 | Stateline | United States | Lake Tahoe Outdoor Arena | Ingrid Andress | – | – |
| 2 September 2022 | Stateline | United States | Lake Tahoe Outdoor Arena | Ingrid Andress | – | – |
| 3 September 2022 | Mountain View | United States | Shoreline Amphitheatre | Ingrid Andress | – | – |
| 8 September 2022 | Phoenix | United States | Footprint Center | Ingrid Andress | – | – |
| 9 September 2022 | Chula Vista | United States | North Island Credit Union Amphitheatre | Ingrid Andress | – | – |
| 10 September 2022 | Inglewood | United States | Kia Forum | Ingrid Andress | – | – |
| 15 September 2022 | West Valley City | United States | USANA Amphitheatre | Ingrid Andress | – | – |
| 16 September 2022 | Denver | United States | Ball Arena | Ingrid Andress | – | – |
| 17 September 2022 | Wichita | United States | Intrust Bank Arena | Ingrid Andress | – | – |
| 22 September 2022 | Grand Rapids | United States | Van Andel Arena | Ingrid Andress | – | – |
| 23 September 2022 | Columbus | United States | Nationwide Arena | Ingrid Andress | – | – |
| 24 September 2022 | Tinley Park | United States | Hollywood Casino Amphitheatre | Ingrid Andress | – | – |
| 29 September 2022 | Kansas City | United States | T-Mobile Center | Ingrid Andress | – | – |
| 30 September 2022 | Oklahoma City | United States | Paycom Center | Ingrid Andress | – | – |
| 1 October 2022 | Fort Worth | United States | Dickies Arena | Ingrid Andress | – | – |
| 6 October 2022 | Lexington | United States | Rupp Arena | Ingrid Andress | – | – |
| 7 October 2022 | Nashville | United States | Bridgestone Arena | Ingrid Andress | – | – |
| 8 October 2022 | Atlanta | United States | State Farm Arena | Ingrid Andress | – | – |
| 13 October 2022 | Savannah | United States | Enmarket Arena | Ingrid Andress | – | – |
| 14 October 2022 | Knoxville | United States | Thompson-Boling Arena | Ingrid Andress | – | – |
| 15 October 2022 | Charleston | United States | Charleston Coliseum | Ingrid Andress | – | – |
| 20 October 2022 | Wilkes-Barre | United States | Mohegan Sun Arena at Casey Plaza | Ingrid Andress | – | – |
| 21 October 2022 | Uncasville | United States | Mohegan Sun Arena | Ingrid Andress | – | – |
| 22 October 2022 | Elmont | United States | UBS Arena | Ingrid Andress | – | – |
| 3 November 2022 | Madison | United States | Alliant Energy Center | Ingrid Andress | – | – |
| 4 November 2022 | Saint Paul | United States | Xcel Energy Center | Ingrid Andress | – | – |
Oceania
| 1 December 2022 | Gold Coast | Australia | Gold Coast Convention and Exhibition Centre | NA | — | — |
| 2 December 2022 | Brisbane | Australia | Brisbane Entertainment Centre | NA | — | — |
| 3 December 2022 | Brisbane | Australia | Brisbane Entertainment Centre | NA | — | — |
| 5 December 2022 | Sydney | Australia | Qudos Bank Arena | NA | — | — |
| 6 December 2022 | Sydney | Australia | Qudos Bank Arena | NA | — | — |
| 8 December 2022 | Wollongong | Australia | WIN Entertainment Centre | NA | — | — |
| 10 December 2022 | Deniliquin | Australia | | NA | — | — |
| 12 December 2022 | Newcastle | Australia | Newcastle Entertainment Centre | NA | — | — |
| 14 December 2022 | Adelaide | Australia | Adelaide Entertainment Centre | NA | — | — |
| 16 December 2022 | Melbourne | Australia | Rod Laver Arena | NA | — | — |
| 17 December 2022 | Melbourne | Australia | Rod Laver Arena | NA | — | — |
