= Fransisca Hall =

- Born: United Kingdom
- Genres: Pop; dance
- Occupation: Songwriter
- Label: Sony/ATV Music Publishing

Fransisca Hall, sometimes credited as Fran Hall, is a songwriter signed to Sony/ATV Music Publishing whose credits include: Kelly Clarkson, Britney Spears, Major Lazer, Selena Gomez, Icona Pop, Fitz and the Tantrums, Cheryl Cole, Eden xo, and Jasmine Thompson. She has also enjoyed success with numerous ad campaigns and film/television syncs including T-Mobile, Nissan, Jem and the Holograms, Pretty Little Liars, The Smurfs 2, and We're the Millers, among many others.

== Selected discography ==
Year	Artist	Title	Album	Label	Credited as	Accolades
2012	Juliet Simms	"Wild Child"	Single	Republic	Writer	
2013	Fantasia	"In Deep"	Side Effects of You	RCA	Writer	
2013	Big Time Rush	"We Are"	24/Seven	Columbia	Writer	
2013	Britney Spears	"Ooh La La"	The Smurfs 2 Soundtrack	Kemosabe/RCA	Writer	
2013	Selena Gomez	"I Like It That Way"	Stars Dance	Hollywood	Writer	
2013	Emblem3	"Do It All Again"	Nothing To Lose	Columbia	Writer	
2013	Icona Pop	"Light Me Up" and "In The Stars"	This Is... Icona Pop	Atlantic	Writer	
2013	We The Kings	"Any Other Way"	Somewhere Somehow	Ozone	Writer	
2014	Eden xo	"Too Cool To Dance"	Single	Virgin	Writer	
2014	Cheryl	"Waiting for Lightning"	Only Human	Polydor	Writer	
2015	Indiana	"Only the Lonely" and "Play Dead"	No Romeo	Epic	Writer	
2015	Kelly Clarkson	"In the Blue"	Piece by Piece	RCA	Writer	
2015	Anjulie	"Falling In Love Again"	Single		Writer	
2015	Major Lazer	"Powerful (feat. Ellie Goulding)"	Peace is the Mission	Mad Decent	Writer	
2015	KSHMR & Vaski	"Lazer Love"	Single	Spinnin'	Writer/Featured Vocalist	
2015	Jem and The Holograms	"Youngblood"	Jem and The Holograms Soundtrack		Writer	
2015	Mr Rogers	"I'll Take You"	Single	Atlantic	Writer/Featured Vocalist	
2015	Jasmine Thompson	"Crystal Heart"	Adore (EP)	Atlantic	Writer	
2016	Foxes	"Feet Don't Fail Me Now"	All I Need	Sony Music Entertainment	Writer	
2016	Fitz and the Tantrums	"A Place for Us" and "Do What You Want"	Fitz and the Tantrums	Elektra	Writer	
2016	Broods	"Conscious"	Conscious	Capitol	Writer	
2017	Betty Who	"Mama Say"	The Valley	RCA	Writer	
2017	Lea Michele	"Believer"	Places	Columbia	Writer	
2017	Lea Michele	"Tornado"	Places	Columbia	Writer	
2017	Olivia Holt	"Generous"		Hollywood	Writer	
2017	Spencer Ludwig	"Legend"		Warner Bros. Records	Writer	
2017	Terror Jr	"Personal"	Bop City 2 Terror Rising	Atlantic Records	Writer	
2017	Anjulie	"Where The Love Goes"	Single	Spinnin Records	Writer	
2017	Ella Eyre featuring Ty$	"Ego"	Album TBD	Virgin EMI	Writer	
2017	Tayler Buono	"Who Am I"	Single	RCA Records	Writer	
2017	Charli XCX	"Femmebot"	Pop 2	Asylum Records	Writer	
2018	Weathers	"1983"	Kids In The Night	RCA Records	Writer	
2018	Weathers	"I'm Not Ok"	Kids In The Night	RCA Records	Writer	
2018	Baauer and Lil Miquela	"Hate Me"			Writer	
2018	Elley Duhé	"Starz"	Dragon Mentality	RCA Records	Writer	
2019	Illenium	"Pray"	Ascend	Astralwerks	Writer	
2020	Keith Urban	"Change Your Mind"	The Speed of Now Part 1	Hit Red / Capitol Nashville	Writer	
2021	Imagine Dragons	"Follow You"	Mercury - Act 1	Kidinakorner / Interscope	Writer	
2022	Lauren Spencer-Smith	"Fingers Crossed"				
