= Change Your Mind (Keith Urban song) =

2020 song by Keith Urban

Single by Keith Urban

from the album The Speed of Now Part 1
- Released: 7 August 2020
- Genre: Pop
- Length: 3:53
- Label: Hit Red; Capitol Nashville; UMA
- Songwriters: Matthew Koma; Fransisca Hall
- Producers: Keith Urban; Matthew Koma; Dan McCarroll

Keith Urban singles chronology
"Superman" (2020)	"Change Your Mind" (2020)	"One Too Many" (2020)

Lyric Video
- "Change Your Mind" on YouTube

"Change Your Mind" is a song recorded by Australian and American country artist Keith Urban. The track was written by Fransisca Hall and Matthew Koma. It was the fifth single released in Australia off Urban's eleventh studio album The Speed of Now Part 1, and was released simultaneously with the official announcement of the album.

== Critical reception ==
Angela Stefano of Taste of Country described the song as a "dreamy, though sad, look back at a past relationship". Hannah Barnes of Popculture called the song ""What-if"-driven". Soundigest stated that "Change Your Mind" is a "little bit different" than the singles "Polaroid" and "Superman" from The Speed of Now Part 1, and that shows how Urban "incorporates a layer of depth to every one of his projects".

== Credits ==
Adapted from The Speed of Now Part 1 liner notes.

- Matthew Koma – acoustic guitar, electric guitar, banjo, keyboards, drums, background vocals, production
- Dan McCaroll – production
- Wendy Molvion – bass guitar
- Keith Urban – electric guitar solo, lead vocals, production

== Chart performance ==
"Change Your Mind" reached a peak of number 30 on the TMN Country Hot 50 in Australia.

Chart (2020)	Peak position
Australia Country Hot 50 (TMN)	30

== Release history ==
Region	Date	Format	Label	Ref.
Various	7 August 2020	Digital download; streaming	Hit Red Records; Capitol Records Nashville	
Australia	7 August 2020	Contemporary hit radio	Universal Music Australia	
