= Brown Eyes Baby =

2022 song by Keith Urban

Single by Keith Urban
- B-side: "Wild Hearts"
- Released: 8 July 2022
- Genre: Country
- Length: 3:44
- Label: Hit Red; Capitol Nashville
- Songwriters: Josh Thompson; Morgan Wallen; Rodney Clawson; Will Bundy
- Producers: Dann Huff; Keith Urban

Keith Urban singles chronology
"Nightfalls" (2022)	"Brown Eyes Baby" (2022)	"Street Called Main" (2022)

Music video
- "Brown Eyes Baby" on YouTube

"Brown Eyes Baby" is a song recorded and co-produced by Australian-American country music artist Keith Urban. The song was written by fellow country music artist Morgan Wallen alongside Josh Thompson, Rodney Clawson, and Will Bundy.

== Background and release ==
Urban stated that upon hearing "Brown Eyes Baby" in January 2022, he had a "visceral reaction," and "just loved it." He remarked, "Once I heard it a lot more, I realized it’s everything: it’s the lyric, it’s the melody, it’s the way the song is written. It just connected. It made a connection with me." He was unaware of who had written the song until after he had decided to record it, as the original demo was sung by Josh Thompson.

Urban previewed a clip of a live performance of the song from his tour on social media on June 29, 2022. It was released to digital and streaming platforms as well as country radio on July 8, 2022. Morgan Wallen took to Instagram to thank Urban for "doing [his] thing" with the song, adding that he was "proud to be a part of writing it."

== Critical reception ==
Billy Dukes of Taste of Country reviewed the song favourably, calling it a "vocal and lyrical showcase." He added that the "right song found the right singer," noting how Urban's "sensitive touch" and " electric guitar" steered the song in the right direction. An uncredited review from 101.3 Real Country noted a similar subject matter to Urban's 2016 hit "Blue Ain't Your Color", adding that the song's "melody features a smooth, sway-a-long groove that’s a perfect fit for a live show. Buddy Iahn of The Music Universe stated that the song has a "beautiful, melodic chorus and a signature Urban guitar hook."

== Live performance ==
Urban debuted "Brown Eyes Baby" live on the opening night of his "The Speed of Now World Tour" in the spring of 2022. On June 30, 2022, Urban performed the song live from the Rockefeller Center in New York City. He also performed it on NBC's Today Show that day. In November 2022, he performed the song on ABC's Good Morning America program.

== Track listings ==
Digital download – single

1. "Brown Eyes Baby" – 3:45

Cassette – single

1. "Brown Eyes Baby" – 3:45
2. "Wild Hearts – 3:02

== Personnel ==
Adapted from the cassette booklet.

- Adam Ayan – mastering
- Drew Bollman – mixing assistance
- Matt Chamberlain – drums
- Dann Huff – production, electric guitar, programming
- David Huff – programming
- Scott Johnson – production coordinator
- Charlie Judge – Hammond B-3 organ, synthesizer
- Zach Kuhlman – recording assistance
- Buckley Miller – recording
- Justin Niebank – mixing, programming
- Josh Reedy – background vocals
- Jimmy Lee Sloas – bass guitar
- Keith Urban – lead vocals, background vocals, banjo, electric guitar, production

== Charts ==
=== Weekly charts ===
Chart performance for "Brown Eyes Baby"
Chart (2022–2023)	Peak position
Australia Country Hot 50 (The Music)	1
Canada Country (Billboard)	7
Canada Digital Songs (Billboard)	24
US Bubbling Under Hot 100 (Billboard)	10
US Country Airplay (Billboard)	11
US Hot Country Songs (Billboard)	31

=== Year-end charts ===
Year-end chart performance for "Brown Eyes Baby"
Chart (2023)	Position
US Country Airplay (Billboard)	34
US Hot Country Songs (Billboard)	71

== Certifications ==
Certifications and sales for "Brown Eyes Baby"
Region	Certification	Certified units/sales
United States (RIAA)	Gold	500,000^{‡}
^{‡} Sales+streaming figures based on certification alone.
