= List of number-one country singles of 2019 (Canada) =

Canada Country was a chart published weekly by Billboard magazine.

This 50-position chart lists the most popular country music songs, calculated weekly by airplay on 46 country music stations across the country as monitored by Nielsen BDS. Songs are ranked by total plays. As with most other Billboard charts, the Canada Country chart features a rule for when a song enters recurrent rotation. A song is declared recurrent if it has been on the chart longer than 30 weeks and is lower than number 20 in rank.

These are the Canadian number-one country singles of 2019, per the BDS Canada Country Airplay chart.

Issue date	Country Song	Artist	Ref.
January 5	"Sixteen"	Thomas Rhett	
January 12	"Sixteen"	Thomas Rhett	
January 19	"Sixteen"	Thomas Rhett	
January 26	"Feels Like That"	The Reklaws	
February 2	"Somebody's Daughter"	Tenille Townes	
February 9	"Girl Like You"	Jason Aldean	
February 16	"You Are"	Aaron Goodvin	
February 23	"What Makes You Country"	Luke Bryan	
March 2	"What Makes You Country"	Luke Bryan	
March 9	"Beautiful Crazy"	Luke Combs	
March 16	"Rhinestone World"	Dallas Smith	
March 23	"Beautiful Crazy"	Luke Combs	
March 30	"There Was This Girl"	Riley Green	
April 6	"Better When I Do"	Aaron Pritchett	
April 13	"Lost"	Hunter Brothers	
April 20	"Make It Sweet"	Old Dominion	
April 27	"Forever's Gotta Start Somewhere"	Chad Brownlee	
May 4	"Whiskey Glasses"	Morgan Wallen	
May 11	"Miss Me More"	Kelsea Ballerini	
May 18	"Good as You"	Kane Brown	
May 25	"About You"	MacKenzie Porter	
June 1	"Keep It Simple"	James Barker Band	
June 8	"Love Ain't"	Eli Young Band	
June 15	"What A Song Should Do"	Tim Hicks	
June 22	"Look What God Gave Her"	Thomas Rhett	
June 29	"Look What God Gave Her"	Thomas Rhett	
July 6	"God's Country"	Blake Shelton	
July 13	"Beer Never Broke My Heart"	Luke Combs	
July 20	"Beer Never Broke My Heart"	Luke Combs	
July 27	"Beer Never Broke My Heart"	Luke Combs	
August 3	"Beer Never Broke My Heart"	Luke Combs	
August 10	"Beer Never Broke My Heart"	Luke Combs	
August 17	"Beer Never Broke My Heart"	Luke Combs	
August 24	"Beer Never Broke My Heart"	Luke Combs	
August 31	"All to Myself"	Dan + Shay	
September 7	"Drop"	Dallas Smith	
September 14	"Rearview Town"	Jason Aldean	
September 21	"Southbound"	Carrie Underwood	
September 28	"Living"	Dierks Bentley	
October 5	"We Were"	Keith Urban	
October 12	"Good Vibes"	Chris Janson	
October 19	"One Man Band"	Old Dominion	
October 26	"One Man Band"	Old Dominion	
November 2	"I Don't Know About You"	Chris Lane	
November 9	"Every Little Thing"	Russell Dickerson	
November 16	"Even Though I'm Leaving"	Luke Combs	
November 23	"Even Though I'm Leaving"	Luke Combs	
November 30	"Even Though I'm Leaving"	Luke Combs	
December 7	"Even Though I'm Leaving"	Luke Combs	
December 14	"Remember You Young"	Thomas Rhett	
December 21	"These Days"	MacKenzie Porter	
December 28	"Heartache Medication"	Jon Pardi	

== See also ==
- 2019 in country music
- List of number-one country singles of 2019 (U.S.)
