= One Too Many (song) =

2020 single by Keith Urban with Pink

Single by Keith Urban with Pink

from the album The Speed of Now Part 1
- Released: 16 September 2020
- Studio: Henson Recording Studios (Los Angeles, California); Sound Stage Studios (Nashville, Tennessee)
- Genre: Country pop
- Length: 3:25
- Label: Capitol Nashville; Hit Red
- Songwriters: Cleo Tighe; Daniel Davidsen; Boy Matthews; Mich Hansen; Peter Wallevik
- Producers: Keith Urban; PhD; Cutfather; Dan McCarroll

Keith Urban singles chronology
"Change Your Mind" (2020)	"One Too Many" (2020)	"Love Songs Ain't for Us" (2021)

Pink singles chronology
"Love Me Anyway" (2019)	"One Too Many" (2020)	"Cover Me in Sunshine" (2021)

Music video
- "One Too Many" on YouTube

"One Too Many" is a song by Australian and American singer Keith Urban and American pop singer Pink from Urban's eleventh studio album, The Speed of Now Part 1 (2020). The song was written by Peter Wallevik & Daniel Davidsen (collectively known as PhD), Cleo Tighe, James Norton (aka Boy Matthews), and Mich Hansen (aka Cutfather). "One Too Many" was debuted at the 55th Academy of Country Music Awards on 16 September 2020 and was released that day as the third single from The Speed of Now Part 1. The song has been serviced to both country and pop radio formats in various territories.

At the 2021 ARIA Music Awards, the song was nominated for Song of the Year.

At the 2022 Queensland Music Awards, the release won Highest Selling Single of the Year.

== Background ==
Urban said "I've always loved Pink's voice, but her artistry and her multi-faceted ability to create, and her God-given talent, truly makes her one of the greatest voices of our time." The song's concept is a couple trying to make their way back to one another after one partner regains consciousness following a night of drinking and the other half attempts to avoid yet another fight.

== Music video ==
The official music video for "One Too Many" was directed by Dano Cerny, and released on 18 September 2020, it begins with shots of various wreckage bobbing along the surface of the water, including a guitar, a telephone, sheet music and other items. Urban is out on the water, using a bobbing sofa as a life raft as he floats along. Then back on shore, Pink sits alone on the beach as she looks out to sea. The pair harmonize as they head into the chorus, each singing out towards each other even though they're not physically in the same spot.

== Live performances ==
"One Too Many" was performed at the 55th Academy of Country Music Awards by Keith Urban and Pink on 16 September 2020.

== Personnel ==
Credits adapted from AllMusic.

- Nathan Barlowe – gang vocals, handclaps
- Spencer Clarke – assistant engineer
- Cutfather – producer
- Daniel Davidsen – bass guitar, composer, acoustic guitar, electric guitar, keyboards, programming
- Josh Ditty – recording
- Jerry Flowers – gang vocals, handclaps
- Serban Ghenea – mixing
- John Hanes – engineer
- Mich Hansen (aka Cutfather) – composer, percussion
- Scott Johnson – production coordination
- Boy Matthews – background vocals
- Dan McCarroll – producer
- Randy Merrill – mastering engineer
- James Norton (aka Boy Matthews) – composer
- PhD – producer
- Pink – featured vocals
- Marco Sonzini – recording
- Cleo Tighe – background vocals, composer
- Keith Urban – acoustic guitar, electric guitar, producer, lead vocals
- Peter Wallevik – composer, keyboards, piano, programming
- Nicolas Weilmann – assistant engineer

== Charts ==
=== Weekly charts ===
Chart (2020–2021)	Peak position
Australia (ARIA)	6
Australia Country Hot 50 (TMN)	1
Belgium (Ultratop 50 Flanders)	26
Belgium (Ultratip Bubbling Under Wallonia)	4
Canada Hot 100 (Billboard)	22
Canada AC (Billboard)	8
Canada Country (Billboard)	1
Canada Hot AC (Billboard)	23
Croatia (HRT)	13
Euro Digital Song Sales (Billboard)	12
Global 200 (Billboard)	55
Iceland (Tónlistinn)	36
Netherlands (Dutch Top 40)	28
Netherlands (Single Top 100)	86
New Zealand Hot Singles (RMNZ)	3
Poland Airplay (ZPAV)	24
Scotland Singles (Official Charts)	3
Slovakia Airplay (ČNS IFPI)	38
UK Singles (Official Charts)	40
US Billboard Hot 100	52
US Adult Pop Airplay (Billboard)	25
US Country Airplay (Billboard)	10
US Hot Country Songs (Billboard)	10

=== Year-end charts ===
Chart (2020)	Position
Australian Artist (ARIA)	19
US Hot Country Songs (Billboard)	95

Chart (2021)	Position
Australia (ARIA)	75
Canada (Canadian Hot 100)	37
US Billboard Hot 100	81
US Country Airplay (Billboard)	25
US Hot Country Songs (Billboard)	11

== Certifications ==
Certifications and sales for "One Too Many"
Region	Certification	Certified units/sales
Australia (ARIA)	5× Platinum	350,000^{‡}
Canada (Music Canada)	Platinum	80,000^{‡}
Denmark (IFPI Danmark)	Gold	45,000^{‡}
New Zealand (RMNZ)	2× Platinum	60,000^{‡}
United Kingdom (BPI)	Gold	400,000^{‡}
United States (RIAA)	Platinum	1,000,000^{‡}
^{‡} Sales+streaming figures based on certification alone.

== Release history ==
Region	Date	Format	Label	Ref.
Various	16 September 2020	Digital download; streaming	Capitol Nashville; Hit Red	
Australia	18 September 2020	Contemporary hit radio	Universal	
Italy	19 September 2020	Contemporary hit radio	Universal	
United States	28 September 2020	Country radio	Capitol Nashville	
United States	19 October 2020	Hot adult contemporary	Capitol Nashville	
