= Polaroid (Keith Urban song) =

2020 song by Keith Urban

Single by Keith Urban

from the album The Speed of Now Part 1
- Released: 24 April 2020
- Genre: Pop; country pop
- Length: 2:31
- Label: Hit Red; Capitol Nashville; EMI Australia
- Songwriters: Steph Jones; Sam Fischer; Mark Trussell; Griffen Palmer; Geoff Warburton
- Producers: Keith Urban; Joey Moi

Keith Urban singles chronology
"Be a Light" (2020)	"Polaroid" (2020)	"Superman" (2020)

Music video
- "Polaroid" on YouTube

"Polaroid" is a song recorded by Australian and American country artist Keith Urban. The track was written by Griffen Palmer, Geoff Warburton, Steph Jones, Sam Fischer, and Mark Trussell, while Urban produced the track with Joey Moi. It was the third single released in Australia off Urban's eleventh studio album The Speed of Now Part 1, and the first single off the album released in the United Kingdom.

== Background and release ==
Although Urban did not write the song himself, he felt connected to the concept of it after co-producer Joey Moi sent him the song to listen to it. He stated that when he moved to Nashville, Tennessee, he and his band lived in a "rundown" house, and someone had given them a Polaroid camera which they used to take many pictures that were hung up on their wall. Urban said "the idea that this couple in this photograph who were at a party that they didn't really want to be at ... And then, all these years later, they're still together," was a "great lyric".

Urban released a snippet of "Polaroid" on social media on the morning of Thursday, 23 April 2020, before officially releasing the full track at midnight the next day.

== Critical reception ==
Lars Brandle of Billboard described the song as a "rollicking guitar-driven pop number". Joseph Hudak of Rolling Stone called the track a "breezy, evocative jam," also adding that it is one Urban's "more electronic-focused musical adventures".

== Music video ==
The official music video for "Polaroid" premiered on 24 April 2020, and was directed by Dano Cerny. The video was filmed largely using motion control technology, and is centred around a pool party that includes couples, a barbecue, and Urban himself with a guitar. He remarked that he did not initially realize most of the couples in the video were real-life couples, and joked that he thought to himself "Man, they're really committed to this role".

== Commercial performance ==
"Polaroid" peaked at number 2 on the TMN Country Hot 50 in Australia. It also reached a peak of number 33 on the Hot Canadian Digital Songs chart.

== Track listings ==
Digital download – single

1. "Polaroid" – 2:30
2. "God Whispered Your Name" – 3:52

== Credits ==
Adapted from The Speed of Now Part 1 liner notes.

- Nathan Chapman – bass guitar
- Dave Cohen – keyboards
- Joey Moi – mixing, production, programming
- Jerry Roe – drums, percussion
- Ilya Toshinsky – acoustic guitar
- Mark Trussell – programming
- Keith Urban – banjo, electric guitar, production, all vocals

== Charts ==
Chart (2020)	Peak position
Australia Country Hot 50 (TMN)	2
Canada Digital Songs (Billboard)	33
