= Superman (Keith Urban song) =

2020 song by Keith Urban

Single by Keith Urban

from the album The Speed of Now Part 1
- Released: 17 July 2020
- Genre: Country pop; pop rock
- Length: 2:50
- Label: Hit Red; Capitol Nashville; EMI Australia
- Songwriters: Keith Urban; Craig Wiseman; Ben Berger; Ryan Rabin; Ryan McMahon
- Producers: Keith Urban; Captain Cuts

Keith Urban singles chronology
"Polaroid" (2020)	"Superman" (2020)	"Change Your Mind" (2020)

Music video
- "Superman" on YouTube

"Superman" is a song recorded by Australian and American country artist Keith Urban. The track was written by Urban with Craig Wiseman, and producers Ben Berger, Ryan Rabin, and Ryan McMahon of Captain Cuts. It was the fourth single released in Australia off Urban's eleventh studio album The Speed of Now Part 1, and the second single off the album released in the United Kingdom.

== Background ==
Urban held a writing retreat in Nashville and he wanted to put together different writers that he knew who has never collaborated before. He elected to bring the three-man group Captain Cuts from Los Angeles and experienced country songwriter Craig Wiseman together and the group came up with "Superman" on their first day of writing. Urban said the song was written metaphorically, adding "I like when listeners can put their own story, their own faces and their own characters into the song, and this one to me, is definitely one of those songs".

== Critical reception ==
Joseph Hudak of Rolling Stone noted influence of 1980s music in "Superman", saying Urban "embraces synth and drum machine, using both to zero in on his new sweet spot", referring to him as "Nashville’s preeminent summer-song creator". Chris Parton of Sounds Like Nashville described the song as "an instantly enjoyable foot-tapper full of much-needed positivity". Eric Alper called the song "infectious," and " brimming with energy and swagger".

== Commercial performance ==
"Superman" reached a peak of number 10 on the TMN Country Hot 50 in Australia. It also reached peaks of number 16 on the Billboard Hot Canadian Digital Songs chart and number six on the US Country Digital Songs chart.

== Music video ==
The official music video for "Superman" was directed by Ben Dalgleish and premiered on 17 July 2020. The video was filmed in a flip book style, with the animation portion of the video being drawn by Andymation. It was mostly filmed at Urban's warehouse in Nashville, Tennessee. He noted inspiration from the video for Norwegian synth-pop band A-ha's hit "Take On Me", which he called one of his "favourite videos of all time".

== Track listings ==
Digital download – single

1. "Superman" – 2:50
2. "Polaroid" – 2:30
3. "God Whispered Your Name" – 3:52

== Credits ==
Adapted from The Speed of Now Part 1 liner notes.

- Nathan Barlowe – keyboards
- Ben Berger – bass guitar, keyboards, programming, background vocals
- Nathan Chapman – bass guitar
- Ryan McMahon – acoustic guitar, electric guitar, bass guitar, keyboards, programming, background vocals
- Ryan Rabin – acoustic guitar, electric guitar, bass guitar, keyboards, programming, background vocals
- Jerry Roe – drums
- Keith Urban – acoustic guitar, electric guitar, keyboards, slide guitar, lead vocals, programming

== Charts ==
Chart (2020)	Peak position
Australia Country Hot 50 (TMN)	10
Canada Digital Songs (Billboard)	16
US Country Digital Songs (Billboard)	6

== Release history ==
Region	Date	Format	Label	Ref.
Various	17 July 2020	Digital download; streaming	Hit Red Records; Capitol Records Nashville	
Australia	17 July 2020	Contemporary hit radio	EMI Music Australia	
