= Street Called Main =

2022 song by Keith Urban

Single by Keith Urban
- Released: 28 October 2022
- Genre: Country pop; country rock
- Length: 3:49
- Label: Hit Red; Capitol Nashville; EMI Australia
- Songwriters: Chris LaCorte; Josh Miller; Scooter Carusoe
- Producers: Keith Urban; Dann Huff

Keith Urban singles chronology
"Brown Eyes Baby" (2022)	"Street Called Main" (2022)	"Straight Line" (2024)

Music video
- "Street Called Main" on YouTube

"Street Called Main" is a song recorded and co-produced by Australian-American country artist Keith Urban. The song was written by Chris LaCorte, Josh Miller, and Scooter Carusoe. It was intended to be included on a 2023 album by Urban that was later cancelled.

== Background ==
When Urban first heard the demo of "Street Called Main", he loved it "right out of the gate," especially for the melody and lyrics. He viewed the song as conveying the idea that "some memories are triggered by the simplest of things, like finding yourself anywhere in the world - even on a 'street called main' - and suddenly 'she' comes flooding back. Urban described the song as "pure ‘open road with the windows down’ nostalgia that just makes you feel good." He recorded the track in Nashville, Tennessee with longtime co-producer Dann Huff.

The single art that features Urban holding a boombox over his head is a tribute to a scene from the 1989 film Say Anything....

== Music video ==
The official music video for "Street Called Main" premiered on 17 November 2022. It was filmed in Portland, Tennessee, and was directed by Justin Key, marking his first collaboration with Urban.

== Credits and personnel ==
Adapted from AllMusic.

- Ethan Barrette – second engineer
- Drew Bollman – engineer
- Scooter Carusoe – composition
- Mark Dobson – recording
- Dann Huff – acoustic guitar, electric guitar, production
- David Huff – programming
- Scott Johnson – production coordination
- Charlie Judge – keyboards
- David Kalmusky – engineer
- Chris LaCorte – composition
- Joe LaPorta – mastering engineer
- Rob McNelley – electric guitar
- Josh Miller – composition
- Justin Niebank – engineer, mixing
- Sofie Pederson – assistant engineer
- Josh Reedy – backing vocals
- Jimmy Lee Sloas – bass guitar
- Aaron Sterling – drums
- Conner Theriot – assistant engineer
- Keith Urban – acoustic guitar, electric guitar, production, lead vocals, backing vocals

== Charts ==
Chart performance for "Street Called Main"
Chart (2022)	Peak position
Australia Country Hot 50 (The Music)	3
Canada Digital Songs (Billboard)	33
US Country Digital Songs (Billboard)	22
