= Keith Urban (1991 album) =

1991 studio album by Keith Urban

Studio album by Keith Urban
- Released: 23 September 1991
- Recorded: 1990–1991
- Genre: Country; country rock
- Length: 56:23
- Label: EMI
- Producer: Peter Blyton

Keith Urban chronology
Looking for a deal !! (1989)	Keith Urban (1991)	The Ranch (1997)

Singles from Keith Urban
- 1. "I Never Work on a Sunday" Released: 5 November 1990; 2. "Only You" Released: 27 May 1991; 3. "Got It Bad" Released: 2 September 1991

Keith Urban is the debut studio album by Australian and American country music singer Keith Urban. It was released only in Australia in 1991. It was later released worldwide in 2005 by EMI. This album included three singles, "I Never Work on a Sunday", "Only You" and "Got It Bad", released between 1990 and 1991 respectively. "Only You" was made into a music video in 1991. The album also includes a cover of the Sutherland Brothers and Quiver's 1976 hit "Arms of Mary". Urban later re-recorded the instrumental track "Clutterbilly" with his short-lived backing band The Ranch on their lone album in 1997. The album charted at number 98 in Australia.

== Track listing ==
No.	Title	Writer(s)	Length
1.	"Only You"	Todd Hunter; Johanna Pigott	3:35
2.	"Got It Bad"	Keith Urban; H. Field	4:25
3.	"Blue Stranger"	Paul Kelly	3:26
4.	"Without You"	Urban	3:43
5.	"Arms of Mary"	Iain Sutherland	3:14
6.	"Yesterday"	Urban; G.M Holden	4:25
7.	"Don't Go"	Urban; Holden	4:04
8.	"Hold On to Your Dreams"	Urban; Holden	4:13
9.	"Lovin' on the Side"	Urban; Holden	4:01
10.	"Future Plans"	Urban	3:42
11.	"Love We Got Goin'"	Urban	2:57
12.	"Clutterbilly" (Instrumental)	Urban; Holden; Peter Clarke	2:45
13.	"The River"	Urban	4:52
14.	"What Love Is That Way"	Urban; Gary Burr	3:17
15.	"I Never Work on a Sunday"	Urban	3:44
Total length:			56:23

== Chart performance ==
Chart (1991)	Peak position
Australian Albums (ARIA)	98
