= We Were =

Single by Keith Urban

from the album The Speed of Now Part 1
- B-side: "Happier"
- Released: 13 May 2019
- Genre: Country
- Length: 3:10
- Label: Capitol Nashville
- Songwriter(s): Eric Church; Ryan Tyndell; Jeff Hyde
- Producer(s): Dann Huff; Keith Urban

Keith Urban singles chronology
"Never Comin' Down" (2018)	"We Were" (2019)	"God Whispered Your Name" (2020)

"We Were" is a song written by Eric Church, Ryan Tyndell, and Jeff Hyde and recorded by Australian country music artist Keith Urban. It was released on 13 May 2019 as the first single from Urban's eleventh studio album The Speed of Now Part 1 (2020). A duet version featuring Church was later released, making it the second collaboration between Urban and Church, following 2015's "Raise 'Em Up". The song reached number-one on the Canada Country chart.

== Background ==
Country music singer Eric Church wrote the song with Ryan Tyndell and Jeff Hyde, and Urban produced it with longtime producer Dann Huff. The song uses "vivid imagery" and "earnest nostalgia" to tell of "romances that we all know won't last". Billy Dukes of the blog Taste of Country found the song similar in content and tone to previous Urban singles such as "'Til Summer Comes Around" and "We Were Us", while also noting a more "sparse" production compared to the Graffiti U album preceding it. On 2 August 2019, Urban released an acoustic remix. The song was released as a limited-edition 7-inch vinyl with a cover of Marshmello and Bastille's "Happier" as its B-side.

== Music video ==
The one-shot video was released on August 6, 2019, and was shot in Times Square, New York.

== Chart performance ==
"We Were" reached number four on Billboard's Country Airplay chart. It has sold 65,000 copies in the United States as of November 2019.

== Charts ==
=== Weekly charts ===
Chart (2019)	Peak position
Canada Country (Billboard)	1
Canada Digital Songs (Billboard)	26
US Billboard Hot 100	65
US Country Airplay (Billboard)	4
US Hot Country Songs (Billboard)	7

=== Year-end charts ===
Chart (2019)	Position
US Country Airplay (Billboard)	33
US Hot Country Songs (Billboard)	43

Chart (2020)	Position
US Hot Country Songs (Billboard)	96

== Certifications ==
Region	Certification	Certified units/sales
Australia (ARIA)	Gold	35,000^{‡}
United States (RIAA)	Gold	500,000^{‡}
^{‡} Sales+streaming figures based on certification alone.
