= The Ranch (album) =

Studio album by Keith Urban and the Ranch
- Released: April 1997
- Recorded: 1995–1997
- Genre: Country, country rock
- Length: 43:01
- Label: Capitol Nashville
- Producer: Miles Copeland III; Carlton "Santa" Davis; Monty Powell; Keith Urban

2004 re-release (Keith Urban in The Ranch)
- Re-release cover

Keith Urban chronology
Keith Urban (1991)	The Ranch (1997)	Keith Urban (1999)

The Ranch is a collaborative album by Australian country musician Keith Urban and his short-lived backing band the Ranch. It was released by Capitol Nashville in 1997, and re-released in 2004 with two bonus tracks and re-titled Keith Urban in The Ranch.

At the ARIA Music Awards of 1997, the album was nominated for ARIA Award for Best Country Album.

== Content ==
The instrumental "Clutterbilly" was previously recorded as a solo track by Urban on his 1991 self-titled debut album. "Some Days You Gotta Dance" was later recorded by the Dixie Chicks on their 1999 album Fly. Their version, which features Urban on lead guitar, was released as a single in 2001. "Homespun Love" was later recorded by Steel Magnolia on their 2011 self-titled debut album, "Desiree" by David Nail on his 2011 album The Sound of a Million Dreams, and "Walkin' the Country" by Scotty McCreery on his 2011 debut Clear as Day. The 2004 re-issue includes a cover of Stealers Wheel's 1973 hit "Stuck in the Middle with You" as one of two bonus tracks.

== Critical reception ==
William Ruhlmann of Allmusic rated it three stars out of five, comparing Urban's sound favorably to Rodney Crowell and saying, "He sounds modern instead, and the album reveals a broad, budding talent not far from fully flowering."

An uncredited review in Country Weekly gave the 2004 reissue four stars out of five, saying that it was "lacking his later degree of confidence and polish" but that "The songs are uniformly strong".

Professional ratings
Review scores
Source	Rating
Allmusic	3/5 stars
Country Weekly	4/5 stars

== Track listing ==
All tracks are written by Keith Urban and Vernon Rust except where noted.

No.	Title	Writer(s)	Length
1.	"Walkin' the Country"		2:56
2.	"Homespun Love"		2:44
3.	"Just Some Love"	Cyril Rawson, Scott Phelps	3:18
4.	"Some Days You Gotta Dance"	Marshall Morgan, Troy Johnson	2:29
5.	"My Last Name"		3:48
6.	"Desiree"		5:49
7.	"Freedom's Finally Mine"		3:51
8.	"Hank Don't Fail Me Now"		3:03
9.	"Tangled Up in Love"		3:51
10.	"Clutterbilly" (instrumental)	Urban, Peter Clarke, G. M. Holden	2:41
11.	"Man of the House"	Rust	4:13
12.	"Ghost in This Guitar"		4:11

2004 re-release bonus tracks
No.	Title	Writer(s)	Length
13.	"Stuck in the Middle with You"	Gerry Rafferty, Joe Egan	3:50
14.	"Billy"	Gary Burr, Monty Powell, Urban	3:46

== Personnel ==
=== The Ranch ===
- Keith Urban – lead vocals, lead guitar, acoustic guitar, ganjo, keyboards, hand claps
- Jerry Flowers – bass guitar, background vocals, hand claps
- Peter Clarke – drums, percussion, hand claps

=== Guest musicians ===
- Randy Flowers – hand claps on "Some Days You Gotta Dance"
- Gary Gazzaway – horns on "Clutterbilly"
- Tony Harrell – Hammond B-3 organ, Wurlitzer and glockenspiel on "Desiree", piano on "Ghost in the Guitar"
- Jim Horn – horns on "Clutterbilly"
- Charlie McMahon – didgeridoo on "Billy"
- Johnny Neel – Hammond B-3 organ on "Just Some Love", "Freedom's Finally Mine", "Stuck in the Middle"
- Richard Nord – guest vocals on "Homespun Love"
- Buck Reid – pedal steel guitar on "Man of the House"
- Eric Silver – fiddle on "Just Some Love"
- Joe Spivey – fiddle on "My Last Name"
- Vernon Rust – guest vocals on "Homespun Love"

Strings on "Ghost in the Guitar" performed by the Nashville String Machine, conducted by Carl Marsh, arranged by Carl Marsh, Monty Powell and Keith Urban.

Engineer: Greg Kane

== Charts ==
Chart (1997)	Peak position
Australian Albums (ARIA)	82

Chart (2004)	Peak position
US Billboard Top Country Albums	34
