= Wild Hearts (song) =

2021 single by Keith Urban

Single by Keith Urban

from the EP Wild Hearts
- Released: 19 August 2021
- Genre: Country pop; country rock
- Length: 3:02
- Label: Hit Red; Capitol Nashville
- Songwriters: Brad Tursi; Eric Paslay; Jennifer Wayne; Keith Urban
- Producers: Keith Urban; Mitch Furr

Keith Urban singles chronology
"Throw It Back" (2021)	"Wild Hearts" (2021)	"Nightfalls" (2022)

Music video
- "Wild Hearts" on YouTube

"Wild Hearts" is a song by Australian and American country music singer Keith Urban. It was released on 19 August 2021 as a single on the EP Wild Hearts. Urban co-wrote the song with Brad Tursi, Eric Paslay and Jennifer Wayne, and produced it with Mitch Furr.

== Background ==
Urban stated to fans via Instagram: "To all of the lost ones who aren't really lost ones, this song is for you. We are WILD HEARTS!" He also said in a press release: "I'm here to tell you anything can happen in this life if you got the heart and the passion and a God-lit fire inside." Joseph Hudak of Rolling Stone wrote that the song is "a classic tale of perseverance that preaches a message of not only pursuing your dreams but manifesting them" that alludes to some moments from Urban's life, including his "childhood memory of seeing Johnny Cash in concert with his father".

== Critical reception ==
Matt Doria of NME called the song a "jammy, energetic country-pop track described aptly as 'quintessential Urban'".

== Personnel ==
Adapted from the "Brown Eyes Baby" cassette booklet.

- Kip Allen – drums
- Rich Costey – mixing
- Mark Dobson – recording
- Mitch Furr – acoustic guitar, bass guitar, drum programming, production, recording synthesizer, twelve-string acoustic guitar
- Scott Johnson – production coordinator
- Randy Merrill – mastering
- Eric Paslay – background vocals
- Tyler Tomlinson – electric guitar
- Brad Tursi – background vocals
- Keith Urban – acoustic guitar, background vocals, bass guitar, ebow, electric guitar solo, production, vocals
- Jennifer Wayne – background vocals

== Charts ==
=== Weekly charts ===
Weekly chart performance for "Wild Hearts"
Chart (2021–2022)	Peak position
Australia Country Hot 50 (TMN)	1
Canada (Canadian Hot 100)	59
Canada Country (Billboard)	1
UK Singles Downloads (OCC)	75
US Billboard Hot 100	97
US Country Airplay (Billboard)	4
US Hot Country Songs (Billboard)	19

=== Year-end charts ===
2022 year-end chart performance for "Wild Hearts"
Chart (2022)	Position
US Country Airplay (Billboard)	20
US Hot Country Songs (Billboard)	61

== Certifications ==
Certifications for "Wild Hearts"
Region	Certification	Certified units/sales
Australia (ARIA)	Gold	35,000^{‡}
^{‡} Sales+streaming figures based on certification alone.

== Release history ==
Release history for "Wild Hearts"
Region	Date	Format	Label	Ref.
Various	19 August 2021	Digital download; streaming	Capitol Records Nashville	
United States	23 August 2021	Country radio	Capitol Records Nashville	
