= The Speed of Now Part 1 =

Studio album by Keith Urban
- Released: 18 September 2020
- Genre: Country; R&B; pop
- Length: 49:37
- Label: Hit Red; Capitol Nashville
- Producer: Jeppe Bilsby; Captain Cuts; Cutfather; Dann Huff; Jaren Johnston; Zach Kale; Matthew Koma; Dan McCarroll; Joey Moi; Luke Niccoli; PhD; Jordan Schmidt; Sean Small; Sam Sumsor; Keith Urban; Eg White

Keith Urban chronology
| Graffiti U (2018) | The Speed of Now Part 1 (2020) | High (2024) |

Singles from The Speed of Now Part 1
- 1. "We Were" Released: 13 May 2019; 2. "God Whispered Your Name" Released: 2 March 2020; 3. "Polaroid" Released: 24 April 2020; 4. "Superman" Released: 17 July 2020; 5. "Change Your Mind" Released: 7 August 2020; 6. "One Too Many" Released: 28 September 2020; 7. "Out the Cage" Released: 23 April 2021

The Speed of Now Part 1 is the eleventh studio album by Australian and American country music singer Keith Urban. The album was released on 18 September 2020 via Hit Red and Capitol Records Nashville.

The album won the Highest Selling Album at the 2021 Queensland Music Awards.

== Track listing ==
The Speed of Now Part 1 track listing
| No. | Title | Writer(s) | Producers | Length |
|---|---|---|---|---|
| 1. | "Out the Cage" (featuring Breland and Nile Rodgers) | Keith Urban; Sam Sumser; Sean Small; Daniel Breland | Urban; Sumsor; Small | 3:09 |
| 2. | "One Too Many" (with Pink) | Peter Wallevik; Cleo Tighe; Boy Matthews; Daniel Davidsen; Mich Hansen | Urban; Cutfather; PhD; Dan McCarroll | 3:23 |
| 3. | "Live With" | Zach Kale; Bobby Pinson; Jon Nite | Urban; Kale | 3:18 |
| 4. | "Superman" | Urban; Craig Wiseman; Ben Berger; Ryan Rabin; Ryan McMahon | Urban; Captain Cuts | 2:50 |
| 5. | "Change Your Mind" | Matthew Koma; Fransisca Hall | Urban; Koma; McCarroll | 3:53 |
| 6. | "Forever" | Brent Cobb; Jaren Johnston | Urban; Dann Huff | 4:07 |
| 7. | "Say Something" | Brandyn Burnette; Urban; Hansen; Jeppe London Bilsby; Celine Svanbäck; Scott Quinn; Lindy Robbins | Urban; Bilsby; Cutfather | 2:57 |
| 8. | "Soul Food" | Urban; Sumser; Small; Breland | Urban; Sumsor; Small | 2:36 |
| 9. | "Ain't It Like a Woman" | Justin Ebach; Johnston; Jordan Schmidt | Urban; Johnston; Schmidt | 3:16 |
| 10. | "With You" | Meg Mac; Nate Cyphert; Luke Niccoli | Urban; McCarroll; Niccoli | 3:08 |
| 11. | "Tumbleweed" | Neil Mason; James McNair; Johnston | Urban; Johnston | 2:48 |
| 12. | "God Whispered Your Name" | James T. Slater; Shy Carter; Micah Carter; Chris August | Urban; McCarroll | 3:52 |
| 13. | "Polaroid" | Steph Jones; Sam Fischer; Mark Trussell; Griffen Palmer; Geoff Warburton | Urban; Joey Moi | 2:31 |
| 14. | "Better Than I Am" | Urban; Eg White | Urban; White | 4:31 |
| 15. | "We Were [Bonus Track] (Note: This track is listed as a bonus track on all physical editions of the album.)" | Jeff Hyde; Ryan Tyndell; Eric Church | Urban; Huff | 3:08 |
| Total length: | | | | 49:37 |

Digital and streaming bonus track
| No. | Title | Writer(s) | Producers | Length |
|---|---|---|---|---|
| 16. | "We Were" (featuring Eric Church) | Hyde; Tyndell; Church | Urban; Huff | 3:08 |
| Total length: | | | | 52:45 |

Japanese CD bonus track
| No. | Title | Length |
|---|---|---|
| 16. | "Higher Love" (from Global Citizen's One World: Together at Home) | 2:16 |
| Total length: | | 51:52 |

== Personnel ==
Adapted from liner notes.

"Out the Cage"

- Jamareo Artis – bass guitar
- Breland – featured vocals, choir, background vocals
- Jamie Muhoberac – keyboards
- Nile Rodgers – electric guitar
- Sean Small – acoustic guitar, electric guitar, keyboards, programming
- Sam Sumsor – acoustic guitar, electric guitar, keyboards, programming
- Keith Urban – acoustic guitar, electric guitar, ganjo, lead vocals

"One Too Many"

- Nathan Barlowe – gang vocals, handclaps
- Daniel Davidson – bass guitar, acoustic guitar, electric guitar, keyboards, programming
- Jerry Flowers – gang vocals, handclaps
- Mich Hansen – percussion
- Boy Matthews – background vocals
- Pink – featured vocals
- Cleo Tighe – background vocals
- Keith Urban – acoustic guitar, electric guitar, lead vocals
- Peter Wallevik – keyboards, piano, programming

"Live With"

- Johnny Fung – acoustic guitar, electric guitar, programming
- Evan Hutchings – drums
- Zach Kale – acoustic guitar, electric guitar, keyboards, programming, background vocals
- Jimmie Lee Sloas – bass guitar
- Keith Urban – acoustic guitar, electric guitar, lead vocals, background vocals
- Alex Wright – keyboards

"Superman"

- Nathan Barlowe – keyboards
- Ben Berger – bass guitar, keyboards, programming, background vocals
- Nathan Chapman – bass guitar
- Ryan McMahon – acoustic guitar, electric guitar, bass guitar, keyboards, programming, background vocals
- Ryan Rabin – acoustic guitar, electric guitar, bass guitar, keyboards, programming, background vocals
- Jerry Roe – drums
- Keith Urban – acoustic guitar, electric guitar, keyboards, slide guitar, lead vocals

"Change Your Mind"

- Matthew Koma – acoustic guitar, electric guitar, electric guitar solo, banjo, keyboards, drums, bass guitar, background vocals
- Keith Urban – lead vocals

"Forever"

- Dave Cohen – Hammond B-3 organ
- Dann Huff – electric guitar, percussion, programming
- Jerry Roe – drums
- Jimmie Lee Sloas – bass guitar
- Russell Terrell – background vocals
- Keith Urban – acoustic guitar, electric guitar, lead vocals, background vocals

"Say Something"

- Jeppe Bilsby – keyboards, programming
- Benni Christiansen – bass guitar
- Oliver Cliwik – electric guitar
- Mich Hansen – percussion
- Scott Quinn – background vocals
- Keith Urban – 12-string acoustic guitar, electric guitar, lead vocals, background vocals

"Soul Food"

- Breland – background vocals
- Jamie Muhoberac – keyboards
- Jimmie Lee Sloas – bass guitar
- Sean Small – keyboards, programming
- Sam Sumsor – keyboards, programming
- Keith Urban – acoustic guitar, electric guitar, lead vocals, background vocals

"Ain't It Like a Woman"

- Evan Hutchings – drums
- Jaren Johnston – background vocals
- Jimmie Lee Sloas – bass guitar
- Keith Urban – electric guitar, lead vocals, background vocals
- Alex Wright – pedal steel guitar, piano

"With You"

- Nathan Chapman – bass guitar
- Nate Cyphert – background vocals
- Luke Niccoli – electric guitar, keyboards, programming
- Jerry Roe – drums, percussion
- Keith Urban – acoustic guitar, electric guitar, ganjo, lead vocals, background vocals

"Tumbleweed"

- Lewis Burns – didgeridoo
- Nathan Chapman – bass guitar
- Josh Ditty – programming
- Jaren Johnston – electric guitar, percussion, programming, background vocals
- Jamie Muhoberac – keyboards, synthesizer
- Jerry Roe – drums, percussion
- Keith Urban – electric guitar solo, ganjo, lead vocals, background vocals

"God Whispered Your Name"

- Chris August – keyboards, Wurlitzer, background vocals
- Matt Chamberlain – drums, percussion
- Jamie Muhoberac – synthesizer
- Pino Palladino – bass guitar
- Benmont Tench – Hammond B-3 organ, piano, Wurlitzer
- Keith Urban – acoustic guitar, electric guitar, lead vocals, background vocals

"Polaroid"

- Nathan Chapman – bass guitar
- Dave Cohen – keyboards
- Joey Moi – programming
- Jerry Roe – drums, percussion
- Ilya Toshinsky – acoustic guitar
- Mark Trussell – programming
- Keith Urban – banjo, electric guitar, all vocals

"Better Than I Am"

- Keith Urban – all vocals
- Eg White – acoustic guitar, electric guitar, bass guitar, keyboards, piano, drums, programming

"We Were"

- Eric Church – duet vocals (track 16 version)
- Dave Cohen – keyboards, synthesizer
- Dann Huff – electric guitar
- Charlie Judge – synthesizer
- Jerry Roe – drums, percussion
- Jimmie Lee Sloas – bass guitar
- Russell Terrell – background vocals
- Keith Urban – acoustic guitar, electric guitar, banjo, lead vocals, background vocals

=== Technical ===
- Rochel Trlivieng – art director, design
- Kera Jackson – art producer
- Ally Gecewicz – assistant, editing
- Spencer Clarke – assistant, engineer
- Nicolas Weilmann – assistant, engineer
- Drew Bollman – assistant
- Brendan Dekora – assistant
- Michelle Freetly – assistant
- Zach Kuhlman – assistant
- Kam Luchterhand – assistant
- Matt Wolach – assistant
- Mark Dobson – digital editing, engineer
- Scott Cooke – editing
- Eiving Nordland – editing
- Chris Small – editing
- John Hanes – engineer, mixing
- Captain Cuts – engineer, producer
- Josh Ditty – engineer
- Jeff Balding – engineer
- Joe Baldridge – engineer
- Ed Cherney – engineer
- Russel Graham – engineer
- Elthon Mendoza – engineer
- Marco Sonzini – engineer
- Tremaine "Six7" Williams – engineer
- Dan McCarroll – executive producer, producer
- Randy Merrill – mastering
- Joey Moi – mixing, producer
- Rich Costey – mixing
- Serban Ghenea – mixing
- Justin Nielbank – mixing
- Mark "Spike" Stent – mixing
- Spike Stent – mixing
- Russ Harrington – photography
- Scott Johnson – production coordination

== Charts ==
=== Weekly charts ===
Chart performance for The Speed of Now Part 1
| Chart (2020) | Peak position |
|---|---|
| Australian Albums (ARIA) | 1 |
| Australian Country Albums (ARIA) | 1 |
| Canadian Albums (Billboard) | 5 |
| German Albums (Offizielle Top 100) | 56 |
| New Zealand Albums (RMNZ) | 27 |
| Scottish Albums (OCC) | 5 |
| Swiss Albums (Schweizer Hitparade) | 37 |
| UK Albums (OCC) | 24 |
| US Billboard 200 | 7 |
| US Top Country Albums (Billboard) | 1 |

=== Year-end charts ===
2020 year-end chart performance for The Speed of Now Part 1
| Chart (2020) | Position |
|---|---|
| Australian Albums (ARIA) | 45 |
| Australian Country Albums (ARIA) | 3 |
| US Top Country Albums (Billboard) | 64 |

2021 year-end chart performance for The Speed of Now Part 1
| Chart (2021) | Position |
|---|---|
| Australian Country Albums (ARIA) | 7 |
| US Top Country Albums (Billboard) | 62 |

2022 year-end chart performance for The Speed of Now Part 1
| Chart (2022) | Position |
|---|---|
| Australian Country Albums (ARIA) | 23 |

== Certifications and sales ==
Certifications for The Speed of Now Part 1
| Region | Certification | Certified units/sales |
|---|---|---|
| Australia (ARIA) | Gold | 35,000^{‡} |
| Canada (Music Canada) | Gold | 40,000^{‡} |
| New Zealand (RMNZ) | Gold | 7,500^{‡} |
| United States (RIAA) | Gold | 500,000^{‡} |
^{‡} Sales+streaming figures based on certification alone.

== Release history ==
Release history and formats for The Speed of Now Part 1
| Country | Date | Format | Label | Ref. |
|---|---|---|---|---|
| Various | 18 September 2020 | Digital download | Hit Red; Capitol Nashville | |
| Various | 18 September 2020 | Streaming | Hit Red; Capitol Nashville | |
| Various | 18 September 2020 | Compact disc | Hit Red; Capitol Nashville | |
