= The Ranch (band) =

Country music trio (1995–1998)

- Origin: Nashville, Tennessee, U.S.
- Genres: Country, country rock
- Years active: 1995–1998
- Label: Capitol
- Past members: Peter Clarke; Jerry Flowers; Keith Urban

The Ranch was an Australian-American country music trio, which formed in 1995 by Keith Urban (guitar, keyboards and vocals), Jerry Flowers (bass guitar and background vocals) and Peter Clarke (drums and vocals). Most of the group's material was co-written by Urban and Vernon Rust.

They issued a self-titled album on Capitol Records in 1997, and two related singles, "Walkin' the Country" and "Just Some Love", which appeared on the country charts before the group disbanded in 1998. Besides its two singles, The Ranch included "Some Days You Gotta Dance", which was issued in 2001 as a single by the Dixie Chicks, and also had Urban on guitar. After disbanding The Ranch, Urban resumed his solo career, many of which afterwards have included Flowers. Due to his solo success, The Ranch's album was re-issued in February 2004 on Capitol/EMI as Keith Urban in The Ranch with two bonus tracks: "Billy" and "Stuck in the Middle with You", the latter is a cover version of a single by the 1970s band Stealers Wheel. It also featured two music videos, "Walkin' the Country" and "Clutterbilly".

== Discography ==
=== Albums ===
List of albums, with selected details and chart positions
| Title | Album details | Peak positions | |
| Title | Album details | AUS | US Country |
|---|---|---|---|
| The Ranch | Release date: April 1997; Label: EastWest, Capitol Nashville; Format: CD, cassette | 82 | 34^{A} |

- ^{A}Chart position of 2004 re-release as Keith Urban in The Ranch.

=== Singles ===
| Title | Year | Peak chart positions | | Album |
| Title | Year | US Country | CAN Country | Album |
|---|---|---|---|---|
| "Walkin' the Country" | 1997 | 50 | 65 | The Ranch |
| "Just Some Love" | 1998 | 61 | 92 | The Ranch |

=== Music videos ===
| Title | Year | Director |
|---|---|---|
| "Walkin' the Country" | 1997 | Roger Pistole |
| "Clutterbilly" | 1997 | Roger Pistole |

== Awards and nominations ==
=== ARIA Music Awards ===
The ARIA Music Awards are a set of annual ceremonies presented by Australian Recording Industry Association (ARIA), which recognise excellence, innovation, and achievement across all genres of the music of Australia. They commenced in 1987.

| Year | Nominee / work | Award | Result | Ref. |
|---|---|---|---|---|
| 1997 | The Ranch | Best Country Album | Nominated | |
