= Spencer Clark (musician) =

American musician

- Born: Spencer W. Clark; March 15 1908
- Died: May 27 1998 (aged 90)
- Genres: Jazz
- Occupations: Musician, vocalist
- Instrument: Bass saxophone
- Years active: 1923–late 1970s

Spencer W. Clark (March 15, 1908 – May 27, 1998) was an American jazz bass saxophonist and multi-instrumentalist. In addition to bass saxophone, Clark was also competent on mandolin, cornet, trumpet, clarinet, alto and tenor saxes, guitar, xylophone, and string bass, as well as an occasional vocalist.

== Career ==
His first professional experience was on saxophone in a New Rochelle, New York, ensemble in 1923. In 1925–26 he subbed for Adrian Rollini in the California Ramblers on record and in movie palaces. He also played with Joe Tenner and George Carhart in the middle of the decade. He accompanied Carhart on an ocean liner gig in an orchestra which included Bud Freeman and Babe Russin.

While in Europe, he played with Danny Polo, Julian Fuhs, French bandleader Ray Ventura, and Lud Gluskin. His many recordings with both Ventura and Gluskin in 1929–30 established Clark as a highly original soloist on his neglected instrument.

Clark returned to New York City in 1931, where he played with Will Osborne, Bert Lown, and Fred Waring, then joined Ozzie Nelson's band as third trumpeter. His last big band gig was with Dick Stabile's orchestra in the late 1930s, where his bass sax anchored a saxophone sextet led by Stabile (which did not record). Clark, who had become a competent choral singer during his days with Waring, also formed part of Tommy Dorsey's original Pied Pipers, a vocal octet that was soon reduced to a quartet.

After the 1930s music became a secondary profession for Clark, who worked for a newspaper, in the airline industry, and as a land purchasing consultant for Highland Park, Illinois. He played with Freddie Wacker's Windy City Seven from 1954, and recorded with them in 1957. Clark continued to perform into the 1970s, when he played Adrian Rollini's role in a re-creation album of Joe Venuti's Blue Four. He retired later in the 1970s to North Carolina; he continued to play there locally in a trio with his wife, Mary Clark.
