= Never Comin Down =

2018 single by Keith Urban

Single by Keith Urban

from the album Graffiti U
- Released: 31 August 2018
- Genre: Country pop
- Length: 3:34
- Label: Hit Red; Capitol Nashville
- Songwriters: Josh Kerr; James Abrahart; Shy Carter
- Producers: Keith Urban; Josh Kerr

Keith Urban singles chronology
"Coming Home" (2018)	"Never Comin Down" (2018)	"We Were" (2019)

"Never Comin Down" is a song recorded by Australian and American country music artist Keith Urban, released in August 2018 as the third single from his 2018 album Graffiti U. The song was written by Josh Kerr, James Abrahart and Shy Carter. Urban and Kerr are also the producers.

== Background and content ==
iHeartRadio wrote of the song that "The video, set in a club, reflects the song’s lyrics about having a good time on a night out with friends...Although the usual country elements are present, including some banjo licks, the track features heavy bass and some beatbox." The video for the song features Urban as a Lyft driver heading to a party.

== Charts ==
=== Weekly charts ===
Chart (2018–2019)	Peak position
Canada Country (Billboard)	10
Scotland Singles (OCC)	45
US Country Airplay (Billboard)	18
US Hot Country Songs (Billboard)	30

=== Year-end charts ===
Chart (2019)	Position
US Hot Country Songs (Billboard)	90
