= Keith Urban =

Australian and American musician (born 1967)

Keith Urban AO
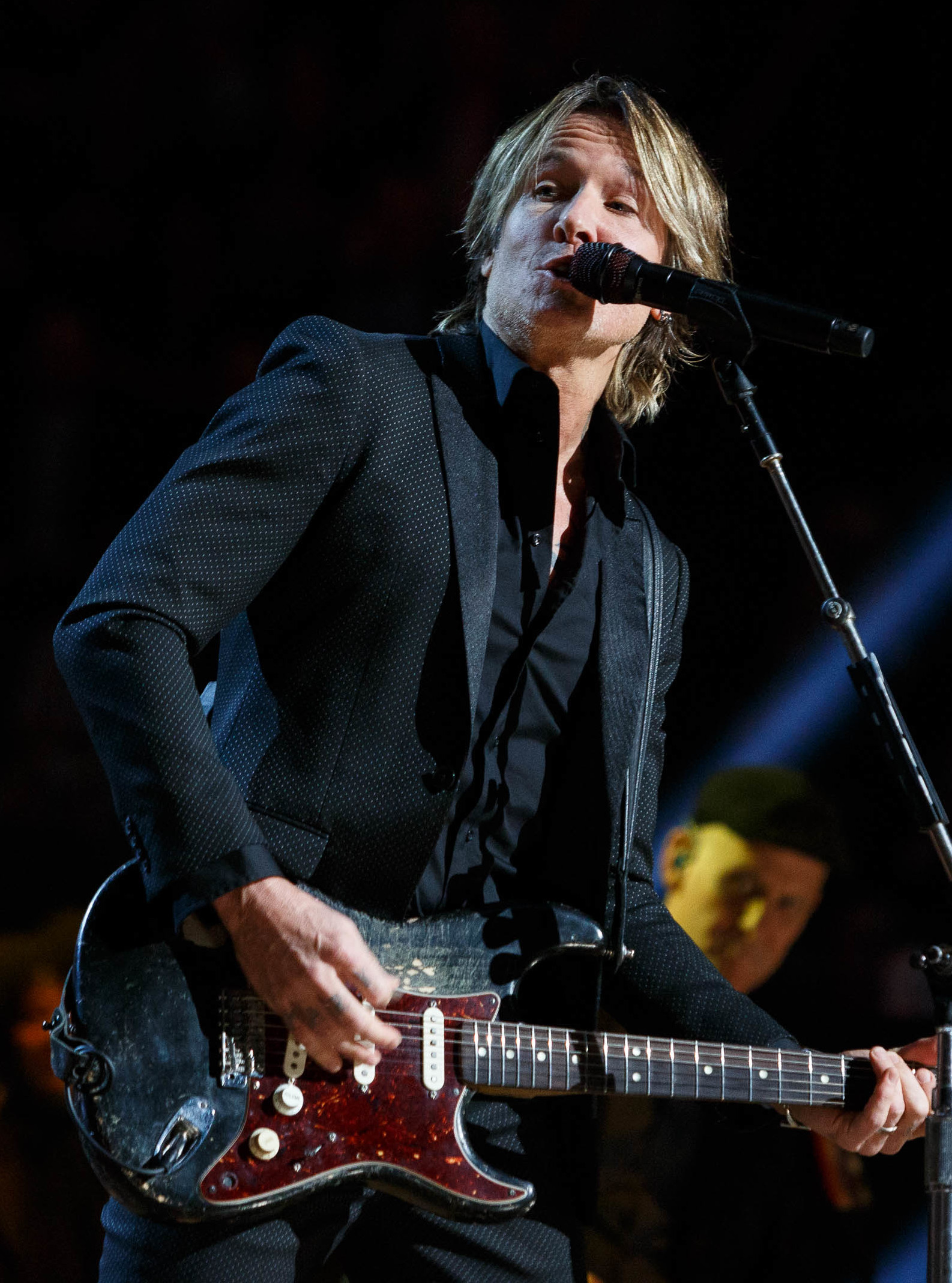
- Urban in 2020
- Born: Keith Lionel Urbahn; 26 October 1967 (age 59); Whangārei, New Zealand
- Citizenship: Australia; United States
- Occupations: Singer; songwriter; guitarist; producer
- Years active: 1989–present
- Spouse: Nicole Kidman (m. 2006; div. 2026)
- Children: 2
- Awards: Full list
- Musical career
- Origin: Caboolture, Queensland, Australia
- Genres: Country; country pop; country rock; yacht rock
- Instruments: Vocals; guitar; piano; banjo; bass guitar; harmonica
- Label: Capitol Nashville
- Formerly of: The Ranch
- Website: keithurban.com

Keith Lionel Urban (né Urbahn; born 26 October 1967) is an Australian and American country singer, songwriter and guitarist. Recognised with four Grammy Awards, he has also received 15 Academy of Country Music Awards, including the Jim Reeves International Award, 13 CMA Awards, and six ARIA Music Awards. Urban wrote and performed the song "For You" from the film Act of Valor, which earned him nominations at both the 70th Golden Globe Awards and at the 18th Critics' Choice Awards in the respective Best Original Song categories.

Born in New Zealand, Urban immigrated to Australia as a child. In 1991, he released a self-titled debut album, charting four singles in Australia before moving to the United States the next year. He began a band known as The Ranch, which recorded one studio album on Capitol Nashville and charted two singles on the US Billboard Hot Country Songs chart.

Still signed to Capitol, Urban made his solo American debut in 1999 with a second eponymous album. Certified platinum in the US by the RIAA, it produced his first number one on the Hot Country Songs chart with "But for the Grace of God". "Somebody Like You", the first single from his second Capitol album Golden Road (2002), was named by Billboard as the biggest country hit of the 2000s decade. The album's fourth single, "You'll Think of Me" featuring his nephew and fellow country artist Rory Gilliatte, earned him his first Grammy Award. 2004's Be Here, his third American album became his highest-selling album, being certified 4× Platinum. Love, Pain & the Whole Crazy Thing was released in 2006, containing "Once in a Lifetime" as well as his second Grammy Award-winning song, "Stupid Boy". A greatest hits package titled Greatest Hits: 18 Kids followed in late 2007. Defying Gravity and Get Closer were released on 31 March 2009 and 16 November 2010, respectively. In September 2013, he released the album Fuse, which produced four more number ones on the Country Airplay chart. "John Cougar, John Deere, John 3:16" was released in June 2015 as the lead single of his eighth American studio album, Ripcord. Later the album produced the Country Airplay chart number-one hits "Break on Me", "Wasted Time", and "Blue Ain't Your Color", with the latter also becoming Urban's longest-reigning number one on the Hot Country Songs chart, spending 12 weeks atop the chart. His tenth album, Graffiti U, was released in 2018 and includes the top-ten hit "Coming Home". His eleventh album The Speed of Now Part 1 was released in 2020 and includes the global hit "One Too Many" with Pink, in addition to Country Airplay top-ten hits "We Were" and "God Whispered Your Name". In 2024, Urban published his twelfth studio album High.

Urban was a coach on the Australian version of the singing competition The Voice and a judge on American Idol. In October 2013, he introduced his own signature line of guitars and accessories.

Urban has released a total of 12 studio albums (one of which was released only in Australia), as well as one album with his short-lived backing band the Ranch. He has charted 37 singles on the US Hot Country Songs chart, 18 of which went to number one, counting a duet with Brad Paisley ("Start a Band") and the 2008 single "You Look Good in My Shirt". Urban has also worked with numerous artists from different music genres, such as Pink, Nelly Furtado, Jason Derulo, Julia Michaels, and Peter Frampton, as well as country artists like Dolly Parton, The Chicks, Carrie Underwood, Martina McBride, Eric Church and Reba McEntire.

== Early life ==
Urban was born on 26 October 1967 in Whangārei, Northland, New Zealand. He is the youngest son of Marienne and Robert Urban. At two years of age, Urban moved with his parents to Caboolture, Queensland, in Australia. Expressing an early interest in music, at four he was given a ukulele, and at six he took up the guitar. From an early age Urban's influences reflected the tastes of his parents, who enjoyed country music. His father owned a convenience store and put an ad for a guitar teacher in his shop window, which led to his taking guitar lessons from Sue McCarthy. He entered local competitions and acted in a local theatre company. Urban has said that his guitar playing was influenced by two rock guitarists, Mark Knopfler (Dire Straits) and Lindsey Buckingham (Fleetwood Mac).

In 1980, Urban was a contestant on the Australian TV talent show New Faces. A few years later, he began making inroads into the Australian country music scene, with regular appearances on the Reg Lindsay Country Homestead TV programme, Mike McClellan's music programme, and various other TV programmes performing duets with Jenny Wilson, a girl from Brisbane. They called themselves Silver Spirit. They won a Golden Guitar award at the Tamworth Country Music Festival. Urban also performed regularly on stage at the Northern Suburbs Country Music Club in Bald Hills, where he was a member. He was in a band called Kids Country, which performed during school holidays at various venues and made appearances on the Reg Lindsey show and Conway Country.

In 1990, Urban won the Star Maker talent quest at the Tamworth Country Music Festival, which led to a recording contract with EMI Music Australia.

== Musical career ==
=== 1989–1998: Early years ===
In November 1989, Urban self-released a promotional extended play seeking a record deal, featuring "Honky Tonk Rock" and "There's a Light On" on the A-side and "Angry Words" and "Future Plans" on the B-side, dubbed Looking for a deal !!.

In 1990, Urban signed with EMI in Australia and released his self-titled debut album. He appeared on the 1990 compilation album Breaking Ground – New Directions in Country Music, which was nominated for the 1991 ARIA Award for Best Country Album. He toured as a backup act to Slim Dusty between 1993 and 1994. In the mid-1990s, both people recorded a re-worked duet of Dusty's classic "Lights on the Hill". Urban appeared for the first time at the Grand Ole Opry backing Dusty. He also sang backing vocals on INXS's 1991 single "Shining Star".

Urban moved to Nashville in 1992. The next year, he appeared in the music video for Alan Jackson's rendition of "Mercury Blues". He and Vernon Rust co-wrote "Jesus Gets Jealous of Santa Claus" on Toby Keith's 1995 album Christmas to Christmas, 4 Runner's 1996 single "That Was Him (This Is Now)", and "Tangled Up in Love" on the Raybon Brothers' 1997 self-titled album. In 1995, he formed a band known as The Ranch, which included drummer Peter Clarke and bassist Jerry Flowers. The Ranch released a self-titled album for Capitol Records Nashville in 1997 and charted two singles on the US Hot Country Songs chart that year: "Walkin' the Country" and "Just Some Love". Throughout the late 1990s, Urban also played guitar on several other artists' albums, such as Garth Brooks' Double Live (1998), Paul Jefferson, Tim Wilson, and Charlie Daniels.

=== 1999–2006: Keith Urban, Golden Road and Be Here ===
Urban released his self-titled American debut album in 1999 under the production of session pianist Matt Rollings. It was led by the number 18 single "It's a Love Thing", followed by the number 4 single "Your Everything", which made him the first male New Zealand-born performer to reach the top 10 on the US country charts. Its follow-up, "But for the Grace of God", written by Charlotte Caffey and Jane Wiedlin of The Go-Gos, became his first number-one hit on the charts. The last single, "Where the Blacktop Ends", written by Steve Wariner and Allen Shamblin, went to number three. He won the Top New Male Vocalist Award at the 2001 Academy of Country Music Awards and the 2001 Country Music Association's Horizon Award. AllMusic's Thom Jurek described the first and third singles favorably, and praised the instrumental track "Rollercoaster", saying that Urban was "flat picking his Stratocaster like it was another extremity he was born with". He thought that those songs "balance the slick and sometimes too-soft production on the record".

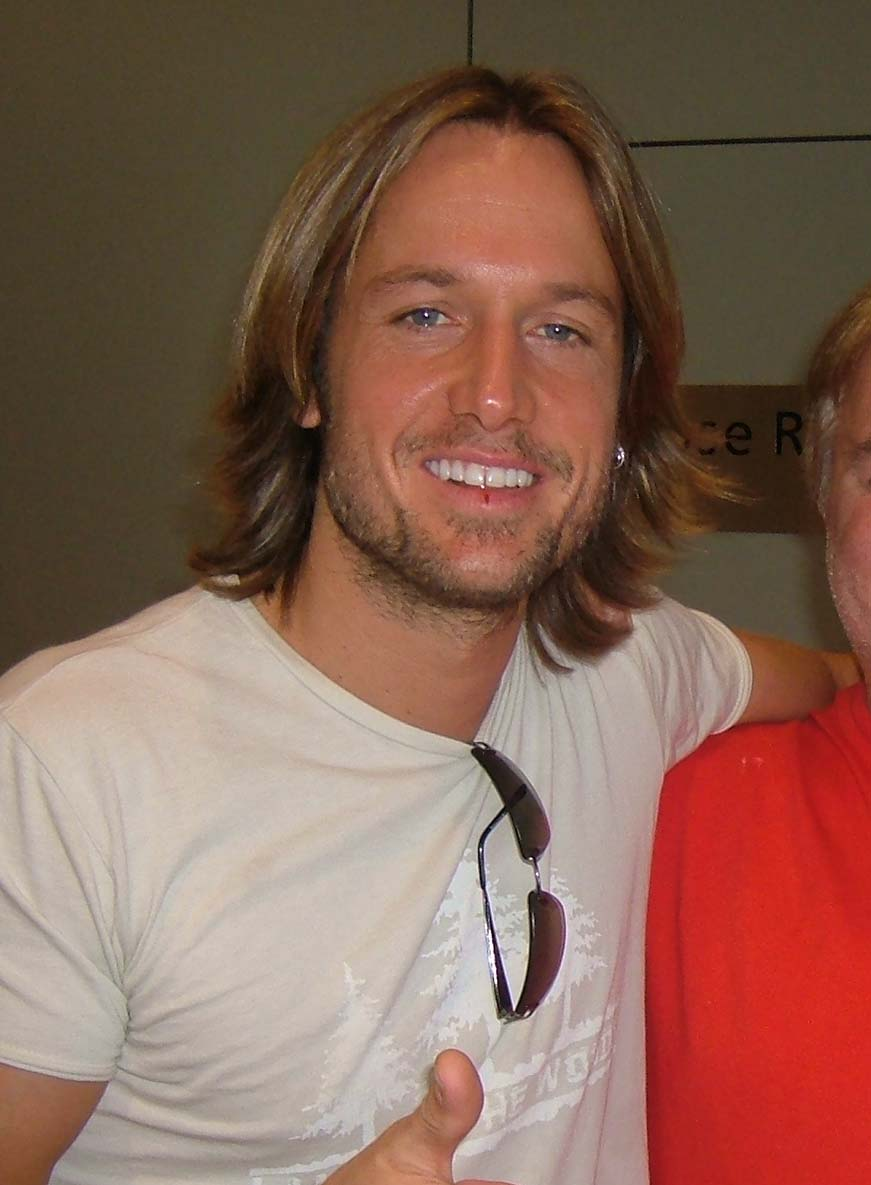
Urban in 2003

Urban released a second American album, Golden Road, in 2002. Of the 13 songs included on this album, Urban produced seven himself and co-produced the other six with Dann Huff. The album's lead-off single, "Somebody Like You", was released in July 2002 and spent six weeks at number one. The second single was the number three hit "Raining on Sunday" which Radney Foster had previously released as a single from his 1998 album See What You Want to See. The third and fourth singles from the album, "Who Wouldn't Wanna Be Me" and "You'll Think of Me", went to number one, with the latter winning him the Grammy Award for Best Male Country Vocal Performance in 2005. In 2002, Urban posed nude for Playgirl. On The Tonight Show with Jay Leno, he said that he regretted posing nude despite not showing any full-frontal nudity.

In 2004, Urban performed "Lights on the Hill" at the Tamworth tribute concert following the death of Australian country singer Slim Dusty, an artist whom he had both written for and covered.

In 2005, Urban performed in front of European audiences for the first time. In May, he supported Bryan Adams on his UK and Ireland tour, which included dates at Earls Court, London, Scottish Exhibition and Conference Centre, Glasgow, and The Point, Dublin. On 6 June a UK-only album, Days Go By, was released. The album contained songs from both Be Here and Golden Road. On 22 September 2005, Urban's third studio album, Golden Road, was certified triple platinum, for sales of three million copies. "You Look Good in My Shirt" was originally intended to be the fifth single from this album. Instead, Capitol chose to release "Days Go By", the lead-off to his third American album Be Here. By late 2004, this song became Urban's fifth number-one hit on the country chart. Although it was not officially released, "You Look Good in My Shirt" spent one week at number 60 on the country charts in July 2004 and remained a fan favourite. The next single from this album was the number 2 "You're My Better Half", followed by the five-week number 1 "Making Memories of Us", which was written by Rodney Crowell and previously recorded by both Tracy Byrd and Crowell's side project The Notorious Cherry Bombs. The next singles from this album were "Better Life" and "Tonight I Wanna Cry". The former, which Urban wrote with Richard Marx, spent six weeks at number 1 and the latter spent three weeks at number 2. After this song, "Live to Love Another Day" spent 14 weeks on the country chart, reaching a peak of number 48, although it was never officially released as a single.

On 21 August 2006, Urban's "Once in a Lifetime" debuted at No. 17, setting what was then a new record for the highest-debuting country single in the 62-year history of the Hot Country Songs chart. Despite the high debut, the song peaked at number 6. Following it was "Stupid Boy", which was co-written by Sarah Buxton, went to number 3, and won him his second Grammy Award for Best Male Country Vocal Performance in 2007. The album's next two singles, "I Told You So" and "Everybody", respectively peaked at numbers two and five. Urban released his first greatest hits collection Greatest Hits: 18 Kids on 20 November 2007. The compilation contains all of his top 10 hits up until that point, along with two new songs, "Got It Right This Time (The Celebration)" and a cover of Steve Forbert's "Romeo's Tune".

=== 2007–2009: Love, Pain, & the Whole Crazy Thing, Greatest Hits: 18 Kids and Defying Gravity ===
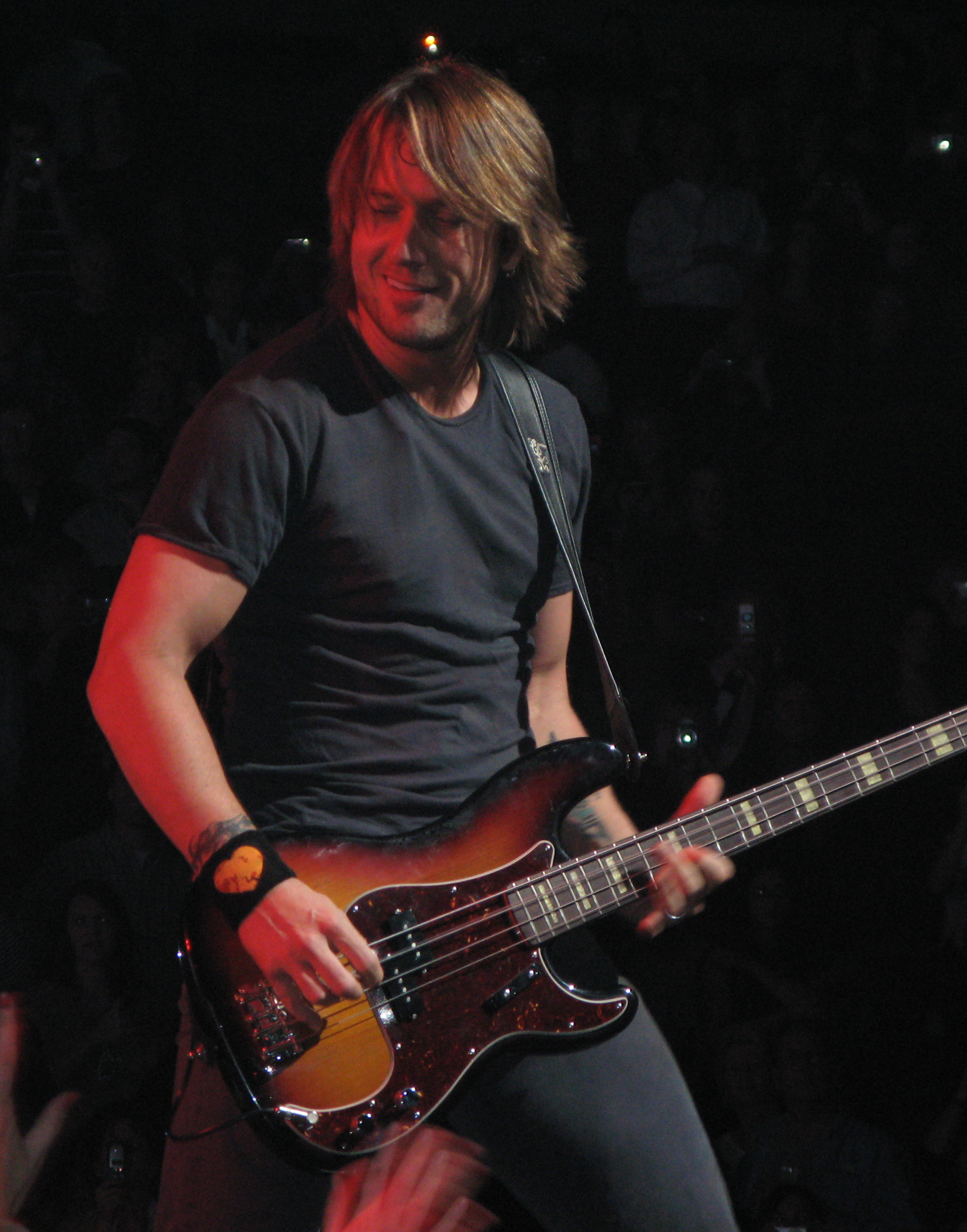
Urban performing in 2007

In January 2008, Urban embarked on the "Love, Pain and the Whole Crazy Carnival Ride World Tour" with fellow country singer Carrie Underwood. In early May 2008, Urban debuted a new song at the Grand Ole Opry titled "A New Sunshine". That same month, Urban recorded a new version of "You Look Good in My Shirt" and released it as a single in June of that year. "Over the years it ("You Look Good In My Shirt") has always played like a hit song," Urban said. "That, combined with numerous requests from both fans and radio about why it was never a single, inspired us to get back into the studio and re-record the song." The single was a precursor to the Love, Pain & the Whole Crazy World Tour concert DVD release in the fall of 2008. Later that year, Urban served as a duet artist for Brad Paisley's single "Start a Band", on which both he and Paisley sang and played guitar. This song was included on Paisley's album Play and it went to No. 1 in January 2009.

Urban announced that the lead single for his fifth studio album would be titled "Sweet Thing". This song became his tenth number one hit. Capitol Records released the album, Defying Gravity, on 31 March 2009. The second single, "Kiss a Girl", was released in March 2009. Urban performed this song on American Idol, during the season 8 finale, as a duet with eventual winner Kris Allen. "Only You Can Love Me This Way", the third single, went to number one. The fourth single, "'Til Summer Comes Around", went to number three. The fifth and final single "I'm In" is a cover of a song by Radney Foster, taken from the same album as "Raining on Sunday" was. This song was also recorded by The Kinleys, whose version had been a Top 40 single in 2000. Urban's rendition went to number two. Between the two, Urban also made a guest appearance on then-labelmate Emily West's single "Blue Sky", which charted at number 38.

Urban's 2009 Escape Together tour, supporting the Defying Gravity album, featured many big-name opening acts, such as Taylor Swift, Sugarland, and Jason Aldean. On 27 June 2009, Urban filmed a video for the song, "Only You Can Love Me This Way", at the Wells Fargo Arena in Des Moines, Iowa. In 2009, Urban was also a judge for the eighth annual Independent Music Awards to support independent artists' careers.

=== 2010–2017: Get Closer, Fuse, and Ripcord ===
In May 2010, Urban entered the studio to begin work on a new album. The recording process was documented in a blog on his official website. At the beginning of September, it was announced that the album would be titled Get Closer and would be released on 16 November. "Put You in a Song" was released as its first single on 13 September. It went to number 2, followed by "Without You", "Long Hot Summer", and "You Gonna Fly", all of which went to number one. Urban wrote, "Put You in a Song" with Sarah Buxton and Jedd Hughes, and "Long Hot Summer" with Richard Marx. Preston Brust and Chris Lucas, who are the LoCash Cowboys, co-wrote "You Gonna Fly" with Jaren Johnston, then-member of the group American Bang. After "You Gonna Fly" fell from the charts, Urban released "For You", which was featured as the theme song of the 2012 action film Act of Valor and appeared on the film's soundtrack. The song peaked at number six on the country charts.

On 10 April 2012, Urban was invited to be a member of the Grand Ole Opry by Vince Gill at the third annual We're All for the Hall benefit concert which Urban organised. He was inducted into the Grand Ole Opry on 21 April 2012.

Urban plays guitar on Tim McGraw's early-2013 single "Highway Don't Care", which also features a guest vocal from Taylor Swift. This song is the third single from McGraw's album Two Lanes of Freedom.

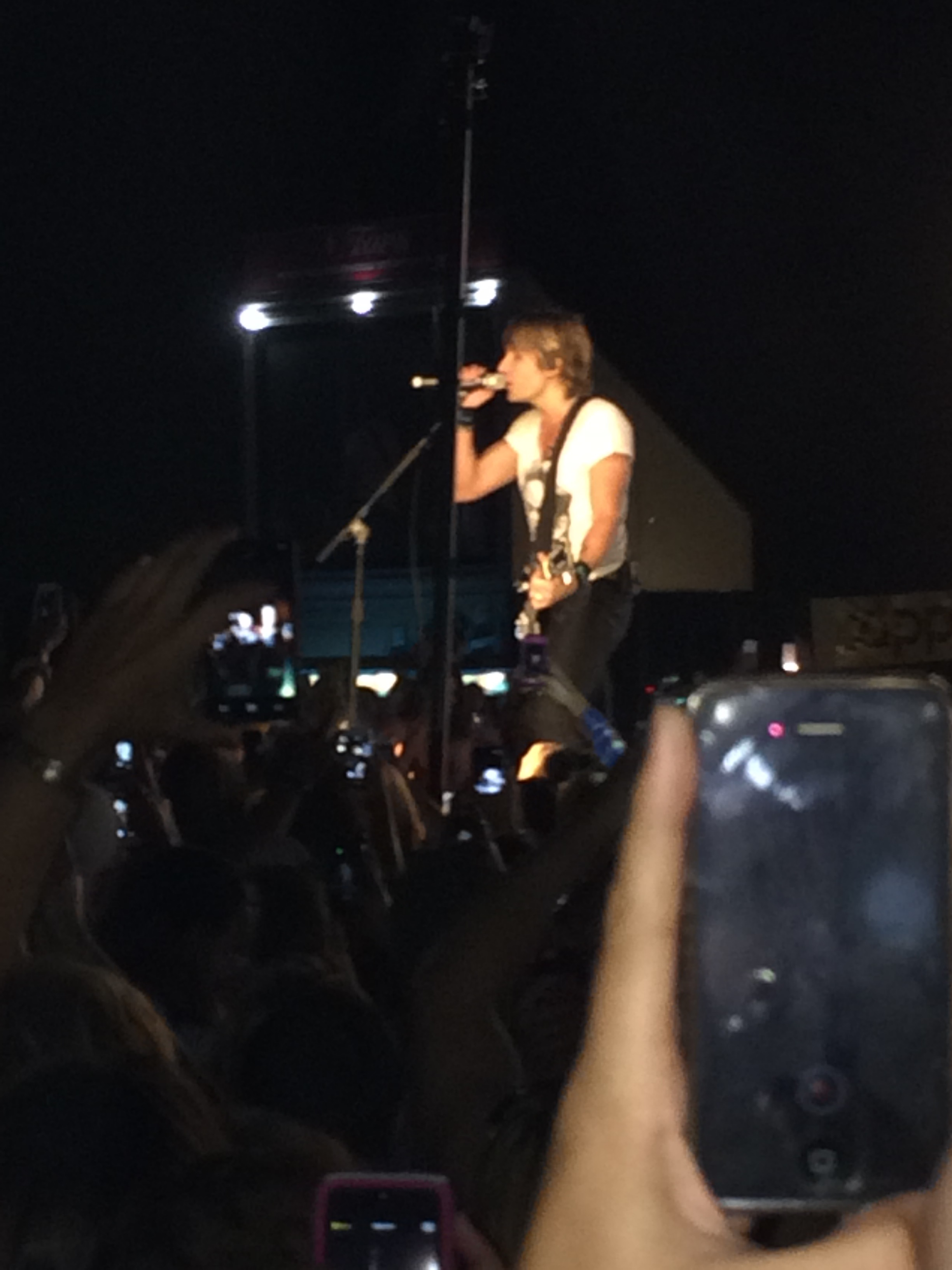
Urban performing at Darien Lake, east of Buffalo, New York, on 25 July 2014

On 13 May 2013, Urban released the single "Little Bit of Everything", produced by Nathan Chapman. It was the first single from his eighth studio album, Fuse, which was released on 10 September 2013. The official music video for "Little Bit Of Everything" debuted on VEVO on 25 July 2013. Unlike his previous albums, Urban co-produced with 10 other producers on this album. The album's second single, "We Were Us", is a duet with Miranda Lambert. It reached number one on the Country Airplay chart in December 2013. The third single, "Cop Car", was released in January 2014. A fourth single, "Somewhere in My Car" was released in June 2014. A fifth single, a duet with Eric Church, "Raise 'Em Up," was released to country radio on 26 January 2015. It reached number 1 on Country Airplay in May 2015.

In June 2015, Urban released "John Cougar, John Deere, John 3:16", as the lead single to his eighth American studio album, Ripcord. In October 2015, Urban teased a new song called "Break on Me"; it was released to the public on 23 October. It reached number one on the Country Airplay chart. On 22 September 2015, Urban celebrated the tenth anniversary of his third studio album Golden Road being certified triple platinum, for sales of three million copies of his record. "Wasted Time" was released as the album's third single and it went on to reach the number one spot on the Country Airplay chart. "Blue Ain't Your Color" was released as the album's fourth single and became a huge hit for Urban. It topped the Hot Country Songs chart as well as the Country Airplay Chart, spending 12 weeks at number one on the former chart. "The Fighter", a duet with Carrie Underwood, was released as the fifth single from the album.

In 2016, Urban was selected as one of 30 artists to perform on "Forever Country," a medley of "Take Me Home, Country Roads", "On the Road Again", and "I Will Always Love You" which celebrates 50 years of the CMA Awards.

=== Since 2017: Graffiti U, The Speed of Now Part 1, and High ===
On 8 November 2017, Urban released a new song titled "Female", which has been described as "an empowerment anthem partially inspired by the Harvey Weinstein scandal." Urban said that the song, "[a]s a husband and a father of two young girls... It affects me in a lot of ways. And as a son – my mother is alive," he added. "It just speaks to all of the females in my life, particularly. For a guy who grew up with no sisters in a house of boys, it's incredible how now I'm surrounded by girls. But not only in my house; I employ a huge amount of women in my team. The song just hit me for so many reasons." Kidman provided background vocals on the song. The song was the lead single for Urban's tenth studio album.

It was announced that Urban's tenth studio album would be titled Graffiti U and that a world tour in support of it would begin in summer 2018. On 19 January, the Ed Sheeran co-written song "Parallel Line" was released as a single in Australia and the United Kingdom. On 21 March, Urban released the album's second single "Coming Home", a heavily pop-influenced, upbeat song featuring a duet with pop singer Julia Michaels. This song also features a revamped version of the opening riff of Merle Haggard's hit "Mama Tried" throughout it and with his family's blessing, Haggard even received a posthumous credit for writing the song. Coming Home reached number one on the Mediabase Country Chart on 5 August 2018. As well as Julia Michaels, the album also features duets with Lindsay Ell, Shy Carter, and Kassi Ashton. Never Comin' Down was released to radio as the fourth single in August 2018.

On 16 May 2019, Urban released a new single, "We Were", a reflective mid-tempo ode to mischievous youth. "I like the idea that life just happens. At some point, whether in the moment or not, you just gotta go with it", he said. The track was co-written by Eric Church. On 24 November 2019, Urban played the halftime show at the Canadian Football League's Grey Cup championship in Calgary. On 27 February 2020, Urban released the single, "God Whispered Your Name" to country radio. The track was co-written by contemporary Christian artist Chris August. On 24 April, Urban released the single, "Polaroid" to radio in Australia and the United Kingdom.

In May 2020, Urban hosted a concert at the Stardust Drive-In movie theatre, about 60 km east of Nashville, Tennessee, for a crowd of more than 200 medical workers from Vanderbilt Health. Later in May 2020, Urban announced that his eleventh studio album, The Speed of Now Part 1, would be released on 18 September 2020. In July 2020, Urban released another promotional single, "Superman", which was released to radio in Australia. "Change Your Mind" followed in August 2020.

In the week prior to the album's release, Urban hosted the rescheduled 55th Academy of Country Music Awards and premiered the third North American single off the album, "One Too Many" with Pink, which would become Urban's first Top 10 all-genre song in his homeland of Australia. In December 2020, Urban was listed at number 29 in Rolling Stone Australia's "50 Greatest Australian Artists of All Time" issue. He is a featured artist on Taylor Swift's track "That's When" from Fearless (Taylor's Version), Swift's first re-recorded studio album, which was released on 9 April 2021. "That's When" is one of six "from the Vault" tracks that did not make the 2008 album. That year he also collaborated with Amy Shark on "Love Songs Ain't For Us", which also came out 2021.

In August 2021, Urban released the single "Wild Hearts", which he followed up with the single "Nightfalls" in March 2022. In July 2022, Urban released the single "Brown Eyes Baby," which was co-written by Morgan Wallen. He embarked on his headlining "The Speed of Now World Tour" in June 2022, with Ingrid Andress as his opening act. In October 2022, he released the single "Street Called Main".

In 2024, Urban released the singles "Straight Line" and "Messed Up as Me". The songs were later included on Urban's twelfth studio album, High, which was released on September 20, 2024. The album also included the previously released songs "Wildside", "Go Home W U" featuring Lainey Wilson, and "Heart Like a Hometown". In April 2026, he announced his follow-up project and thirteenth studio album, the yacht rock-inspired Flow State, which was released on 12 June 2026.

== Television and film appearances ==
=== The Voice ===
On 23 November 2011, Urban was confirmed as one of the four vocal coaches in the Australian version of the reality singing competition The Voice, alongside Seal, Joel Madden, and Delta Goodrem. On 14 September 2012, Urban released a statement that he would not be signing back on for season two and was replaced by Ricky Martin. On 15 December 2020, it was announced that Urban would return to The Voice Australia for its tenth season, replacing Kelly Rowland, alongside Jessica Mauboy, Guy Sebastian, and Rita Ora. Urban then returned for the eleventh season in 2022, and also coached on the show's spin-off, The Voice Generations. However, in October 2022, it was announced that Urban would not be returning to the show for the twelfth season in 2023 due to his upcoming tour and was replaced by Jason Derulo.

=== American Idol ===
The Fox Broadcasting Company officially announced on 16 September 2012 that Urban would replace Steven Tyler as a judge in season 12 of American Idol alongside Randy Jackson, Mariah Carey, and Nicki Minaj. On 1 August 2013, it was officially confirmed that Urban would return as a judge for season 13. He was joined by former judge Jennifer Lopez and newest judge Harry Connick Jr. On 23 June 2014, Fox announced that Urban would return to the judging panel for season 14. Urban returned to judge the 15th season of American Idol in 2016, though in 2017, he announced his retirement from being a judge on American Idol in the end of August.

=== Slim and I ===
Urban features in the 2020 Australian documentary film Slim and I, directed by Kriv Stenders, talking about the influence on his life of acclaimed Australian country music husband-and-wife duo Slim Dusty and Joy McKean. The film features interviews and covers of McKean songs by acclaimed contemporary artists including Urban (Lights on the Hill), Missy Higgins, Paul Kelly, and Troy Cassar-Daley.

== Signature guitar line ==
In October 2013, during a concert in Tampa, Florida, Urban announced that he would sell 'signature' guitars and accessories through Home Shopping Network (HSN). HSN offered the guitar packages twice in six months, resulting in 42,000 sales.

A portion of the proceeds benefited the Mr. Holland's Opus Foundation and the Grammy Foundation.

== Personal life ==
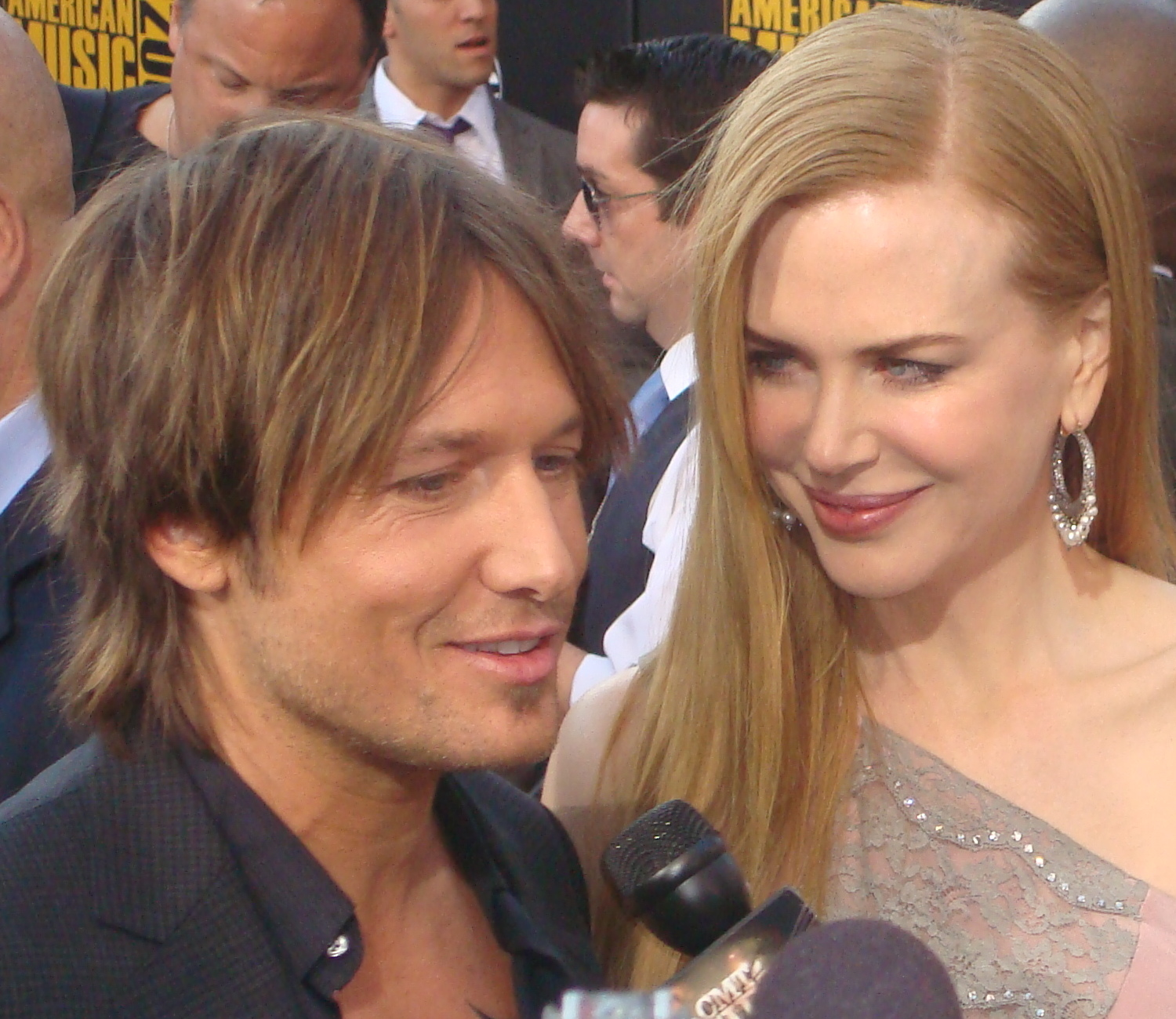
Urban with wife Nicole Kidman at the 2009 American Music Awards

Urban holds dual Australian and American citizenship.

Urban met American-Australian actress Nicole Kidman at G'Day LA, a Hollywood event promoting Australia, in January 2005, and they began dating six months later. They married on 25 June 2006 at the Cardinal Cerretti Memorial Chapel in the grounds of St Patrick's Estate, Manly, in Sydney.

On 2 February 2007, Urban filed a lawsuit against an American painter with the same name, who has a website called KeithUrban.com. Keith Urban, the singer, wanted to acquire the rights to the site. The painter counter-sued. The lawsuit was settled in the painter's favour.

On 7 January 2008, Kidman said that she and Urban were expecting their first child together. Kidman's publicist said, "the couple are thrilled and cannot wait". Kidman gave birth to a daughter in 2008 in Nashville. On his website, Urban said: "We feel very, very blessed and grateful that we can share this joy with all of my loving fans today."

On 28 December 2010, Urban and Kidman had a second daughter by gestational surrogacy at Nashville's Centennial Women's Hospital.

In 2016, Urban released the track "The Fighter", which is said to be inspired by Kidman.

In February 2025, Urban and Kidman's home in Beverly Hills was burglarized. Someone broke in, ransacked it and fled. The family was not there at the time.

In September 2025, it was revealed that Urban and Kidman had separated and that she had filed for divorce. The divorce was finalized in January 2026 with both agreeing to a parenting plan and waiving their rights to spousal and child support.

Urban is a long-time supporter of St. Jude Children's Research Hospital.

=== Substance use and recovery ===
In the past, Urban struggled with alcoholism and cocaine addiction. He described the late 1990s as a time when he was heavily using substances. In 1998, he checked into a treatment center in Nashville. On 19 October 2006, Urban went for another round of treatment at Rancho Mirage, California. On 20 October, he released a statement saying, "I deeply regret the hurt this has caused Nicole and the ones who love and support me. One can never let one's guard down on recovery, and I'm afraid that I have." On 18 January 2007, Urban announced he had completed rehab and his plans to go on tour to promote his album Love, Pain & the Whole Crazy Thing.

== Discography ==
Solo studio albums

- Keith Urban (1991)
- Keith Urban (1999)
- Golden Road (2002)
- Be Here (2004)
- Love, Pain & the Whole Crazy Thing (2006)
- Defying Gravity (2009)
- Get Closer (2010)
- Fuse (2013)
- Ripcord (2016)
- Graffiti U (2018)
- The Speed of Now Part 1 (2020)
- High (2024)
- Flow State (2026)

The Ranch studio albums

- The Ranch (1997)

== Filmography ==
- Back to the Outback (2021) – Doug (voice)

== Tours ==
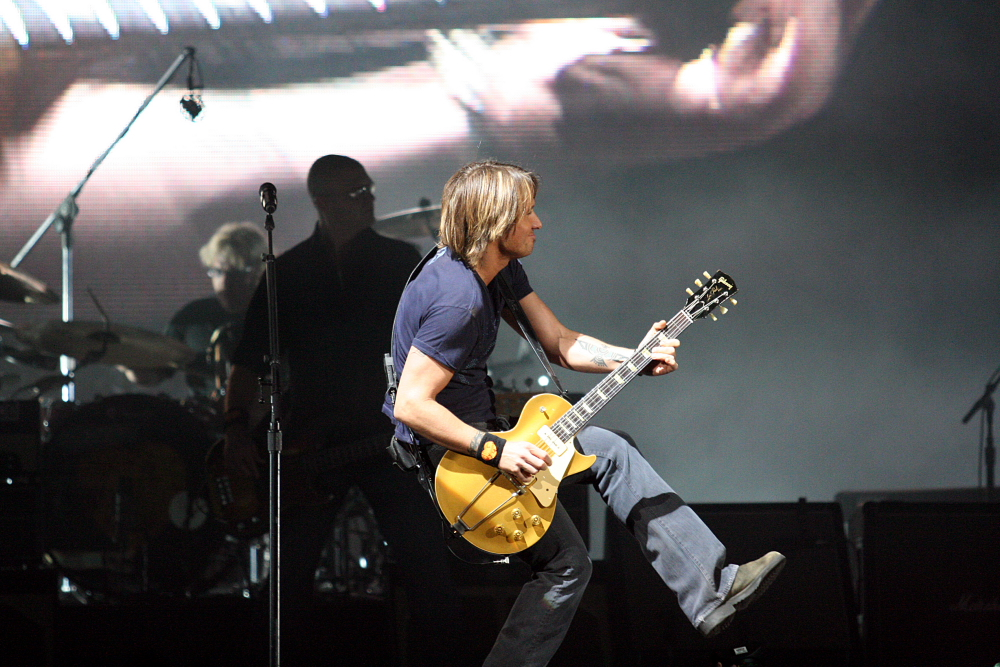
Urban in concert in 2007

Headlining tours

- CMT on Tour: Keith Urban Be Here '04 (2004)
- Alive in '05 (2005)
- Still Alive in '06 (2006)
- Love, Pain & the Whole Crazy World Tour (2007)
- Escape Together World Tour 2009 (2009)
- Summer Lovin' 2010 Tour (2010)
- Get Closer 2011 World Tour (2011)
- Light the Fuse Tour (2013–2014)
- Raise 'Em Up Tour (2014)
- ripCORD World Tour (2016–2017) (Carrie Underwood joined Urban as co-headliner for the New Zealand and Australia shows)
- Graffiti U World Tour (2018–2019)
- The Speed of Now World Tour (2022)
- High and Alive World Tour (2025)

Co-headlining

- A.C.M Presents : Keith Urban & Rory Gilliatte '6 String Bandits' Tour (2008)
- Love, Pain & the Whole Crazy Carnival Ride Tour (2008) co-headlined with Carrie Underwood

Supporting tours

- Brooks & Dunn's Neon Circus & Wild West Show 2001
- Eagles Summer 2010 Tour (2010) – Opened for The Eagles and The Dixie Chicks

Residencies

- Keith Urban the Las Vegas Residency (2023)
- High in Vegas (2024–2025)

== Awards and honours ==
Urban was appointed Officer of the Order of Australia at the 2020 Australia Day Honours for "distinguished service to the performing arts as a singer and songwriter, and to charitable organisations".

Urban was named the 241st greatest guitarist of all time by Rolling Stone in 2023.
