= God Whispered Your Name =

Single by Keith Urban

from the album The Speed of Now Part 1
- Released: 2 March 2020
- Genre: Country
- Length: 3:53
- Label: Hit Red; Capitol Nashville
- Songwriters: Chris August; Shy Carter; Micah Carter; James T. Slater
- Producers: Keith Urban; Dan McCarroll

Keith Urban singles chronology
"We Were" (2019)	"God Whispered Your Name" (2020)	"Be a Light" (2020)

"God Whispered Your Name" is a song recorded by Australian and American country music singer Keith Urban. It was released on 2 March 2020 as the second single from Urban's eleventh studio album The Speed of Now Part 1.

== Content ==
American Christian musician Chris August co-wrote the song with Shy Carter, Micah Carter, and James T. Slater. Urban co-produced with Dan McCarroll. Of the song, Urban told Nash Country Daily, "absolutely spoke to me and tells my journey in such a profound way going through a season in life of being very lost and lonely and confused and not knowing how to get out of that".

Jennifer Massaux directed the music video, which features Urban performing in a basement, from which he escapes to find a sunlit landscape. The basement scenes were filmed underneath a warehouse in Nashville, Tennessee, while the outside scenes were filmed in Lancaster, California.

== Charts ==
=== Weekly charts ===
Chart (2020)	Peak position
Australia Country Hot 50 (TMN)	10
Canada (Canadian Hot 100)	65
Canada Country (Billboard)	2
US Billboard Hot 100	60
US Country Airplay (Billboard)	8
US Hot Country Songs (Billboard)	13

=== Year-end charts ===
Chart (2020)	Position
US Country Airplay (Billboard)	25
US Hot Country Songs (Billboard)	28

== Certifications ==
Region	Certification	Certified units/sales
Canada (Music Canada)	Gold	40,000^{‡}
United States (RIAA)	Gold	500,000^{‡}
^{‡} Sales+streaming figures based on certification alone.
