= The Music Network =

Australian music magazine

- Former editors: Poppy Reid; Nathan Jolly; Jake Challenor
- Categories: Music industry
- Frequency: Digital
- Publisher: Vinyl Group
- First issue: May 1994
- Country: Australia
- Based in: Crows Nest, New South Wales
- Language: English
- Website: www.themusicnetwork.com

The Music Network (TMN) is an Australian music magazine launched as a paper-based publication for the Australian music industry in 1994 by John Woodruff. It was printed weekly until March 2013, when it went fully online. In 2017 it was acquired by Jake Challenor, who served as its publisher and editor. In February 2022 The Music Network was acquired by The Brag Media, which was subsequently acquired by Vinyl Group in January 2024.

== History ==
The Music Network was founded by John Woodruff in May 1994, initially as a paper-based publication for the Australian music industry. This included record labels, media networks, music and DVD retailers, radio and television programmers and music directors, sales representatives, artist managers, music publishers and concert promoters.

In January 2009, the magazine was sold to the music marketing and publishing group Peer Group Media, which is under the ownership of Adam Zammit, who replaced Woodruff as the new owner of The Music Network.

After the sale, its website re-launched on 8 June 2009, with a new design, logo and layout, under managing editor Jade Harley. In March 2009, former Future Entertainment general manager Jade Harley, became the magazine's new managing editor. In September of that year it was publishing the "TopSwaps" chart, which monitored the number of songs downloaded from file-sharing sites each week.

TMN printed a total of 927 issues before the magazine ceasing to print their weekly magazine in March 2013, going fully online. However owners Peer Group Media continued to print Sydney street magazine The Brag at that time.

In 2017, TMN was acquired by Jake Challenor, who served as its publisher and editor.

In 2019 The Music Network began operating the "TMN Country Hot 50" chart in co-operation with Radio Monitor. The chart included airplay data and published a new chart every Friday morning. This replaced the previous "TMN Country Airplay Chart", and is "the most comprehensive country airplay chart in the history of Australian radio".

In February 2022, The Brag Media purchased TMN, with Challenor joining The Brag Media as executive editor, B2B. In February 2023 Challenor departed Brag and set up a new PR agency, Sound Story.

In January 2024, Vinyl Group acquired The Music Network as part of its acquisition of The Brag Media.

== Content ==
The Music Network features the latest music news, radio airplay charts and statistics, music sales data for both physical and digital releases, tour and live event information, interviews with local and international artists, as well as information on new singles released to Australian radio, retail and other media outlets. It includes news, interviews, employment opportunities, future trends, and opinion pieces.
