= Nightfall =

Nightfall or night fall may refer to:

== Time of day ==
- Sunset or sundown, the daily disappearance of the Sun below the western half of the horizon
- Twilight, the period during which the Sun is at most 18° below the horizon and when the sky is illuminated by indirect sunlight scattered in the upper atmosphere
- Dusk, the last stage of twilight in the evening before night

== Film ==
- Nightfall (1956 film), an American film noir by Jacques Tourneur
- Nightfall (1988 film), a film starring David Birney
- Nightfall (1999 film), a film starring Jeff Rector
- Nightfall (1999 German film), a film by Fred Kelemen
- Nightfall (2000 film), a film starring Ashish Vidyarthi
- Nightfall (2012 film), a Hong Kong crime thriller by Chow Hin-yeung

== Gaming ==
- Nightfall (video game), the first real-time 3D adventure game, released in 1998
- Nightfall Games, a UK role-playing game publishing company
- Guild Wars Nightfall, a 2006 computer game in the Guild Wars series
- Nightfall, a deck-building card game by Alderac Entertainment Group
- Nightfall: Escape, a first-person survival horror game by Zeenoh, released in 2016
- Nightfall, a cancelled video game by Maxis South

== Literature ==
=== Stories and novels ===
- "Nightfall" (Asimov novelette and novel), a 1941 science fiction story by Isaac Asimov, and a 1990 adapted novel by Asimov and Robert Silverberg
  - Nightfall and Other Stories, a 1969 collection of short stories by Asimov
- Night Fall (novel), a 2004 novel by Nelson DeMille
- Nightfall, a novel by Will Elliott
- Nightfall, a 1947 novel by David Goodis
- Nightfall, a 2017 fantasy book in the Keeper of the Lost Cities series by Shannon Messenger
- Nightfall, a two-novel fantasy series by Mickey Zucker Reichert
- The Return: Nightfall, a 2009 novel by L. J. Smith
- "Nightfall" (Clarke story), or "The Curse", a 1947 short story by Arthur C. Clarke
- "Nightfall", a 2003 short story incorporated into the 2005 Manfred Macx novel Accelerando by Charles Stross

=== Comics ===
- Nightfall (comics), a DC Comics supervillain
- Nightfall, a graphic novel by Scott O. Brown

== Music ==
- Nightfall (band), a Greek heavy metal band
- Nightfall (Candlemass album), 1987
- Nightfall (Louis Hayes album), 1991
- Nightfall (Charlie Haden album), 2004
- Nightfall (Little Big Town album), 2020
- "Nightfall", a song by Amorphis from Tuonela
- "Nightfall", a song by Blind Guardian from Nightfall in Middle-Earth
- "Nightfall", a song by Circle of Dust from Circle of Dust
- "Nightfall", a song by The Devil Wears Prada from ZII
- "Nightfall", a song by the Incredible String Band from The Hangman's Beautiful Daughter
- "Nightfall", a song by Norther from Death Unlimited
- "Nightfall", a song by Stratovarius from Fourth Dimension
- "Nightfall", a song by Warkings from Armageddon
- "Nightfall", a song by Xandria from Sacrificium
- "Nightfall" (Interlude), a song by Tinashe from Aquarius
- "Nightfalls", a song by Keith Urban

== Radio and television ==
- Nightfall (radio series), a 1980–1983 Canadian supernatural/horror series
- "Night Fall" (Yin-Yang-Yo!), an episode of the TV series Yin-Yang-Yo!
- "Nightfall", an episode of the radio program Dimension X, based on the Isaac Asimov story (see above)
- Operation Nightfall, a fictional operation in the first season of the TV series 24
- Halo: Nightfall, a 2014 series set in the Halo universe

== Other ==
- Nightfall meteorite, the colloquial name for the El Ali meteorite
- Nocturnal emission, a spontaneous orgasm during sleep that includes ejaculation for a male, or vaginal wetness or an orgasm (or both) for a female.
- Nightfall (missile), a British short-range ballistic missile

== See also ==
- The Fall of Night (TV episode) 1995 episode of Babylon 5
- Against the Fall of Night (novel) 1948 novel by Arthur C. Clarke
  - The City and the Stars (novel) 1956 novel by Arthur C. Clarke, sometimes referred to as some variation of "fall of night"
- Beyond the Fall of Night (novel) 1990 novel by Gregory Benford, based on the work of Arthur C. Clakre
- Knightfall (disambiguation)
