= Horizontal elevator =

A horizontal elevator may refer to:

- A person conveyor, such as a moving walkway
- A people mover, a small vehicle travelling automatically on a rail or road surface
