= Moving walkway =

Conveyor mechanism for transporting people

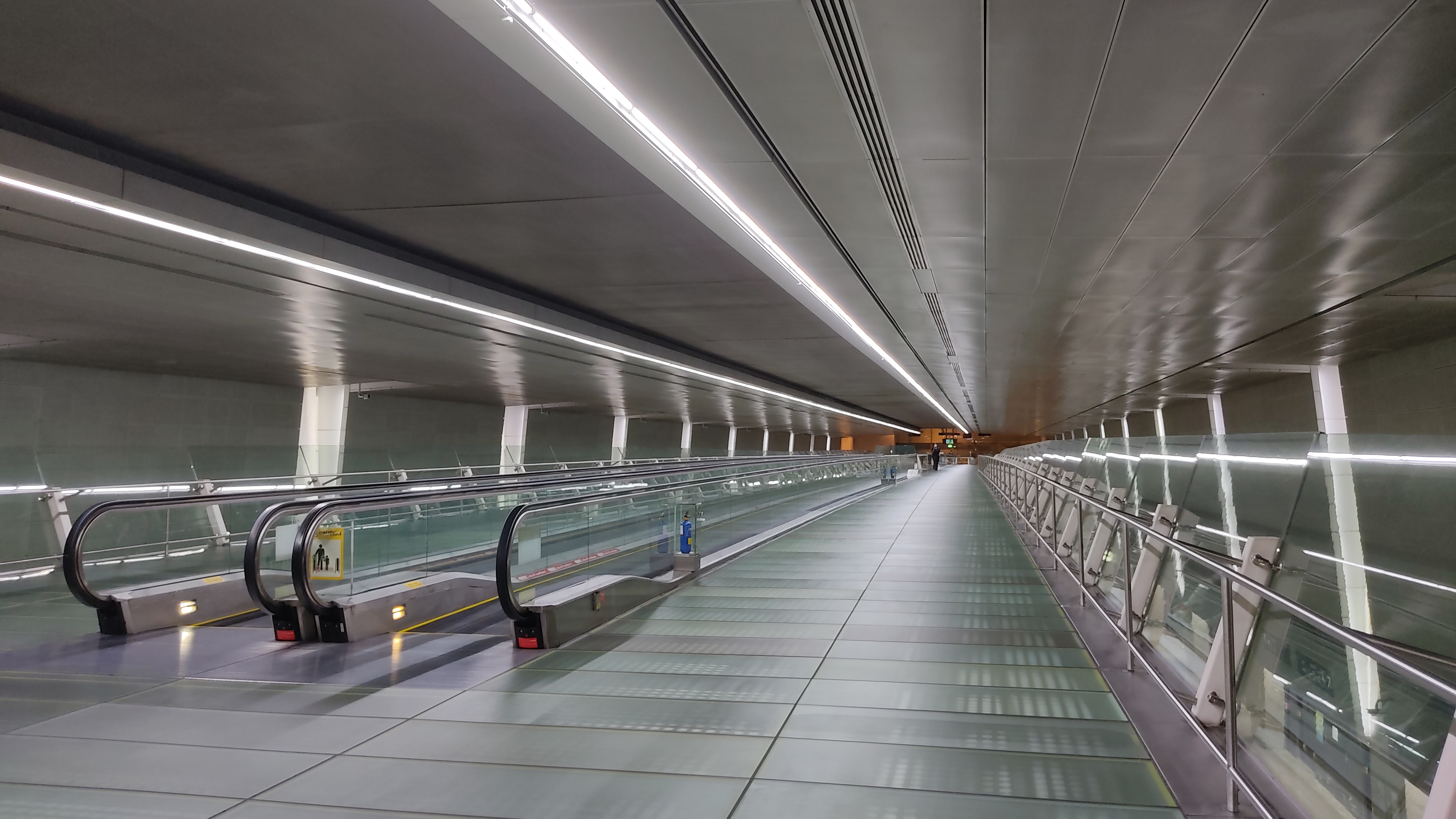
Moving walkway inside the Changi Airport station of the Singapore MRT

A moving walkway – also known as an autowalk, moving pavement, moving sidewalk, movator, travolator, or travelator – is a slow-moving conveyor mechanism that transports people across a horizontal or inclined plane over a short to medium distance. They can be used by standing on them or walking on them, allowing users to cover that distance with less effort and/or more speed than by walking. They are commonly installed in pairs to provide transport in each direction. They are typically designed similarly to escalators and share much of the same underlying technology.

== History ==
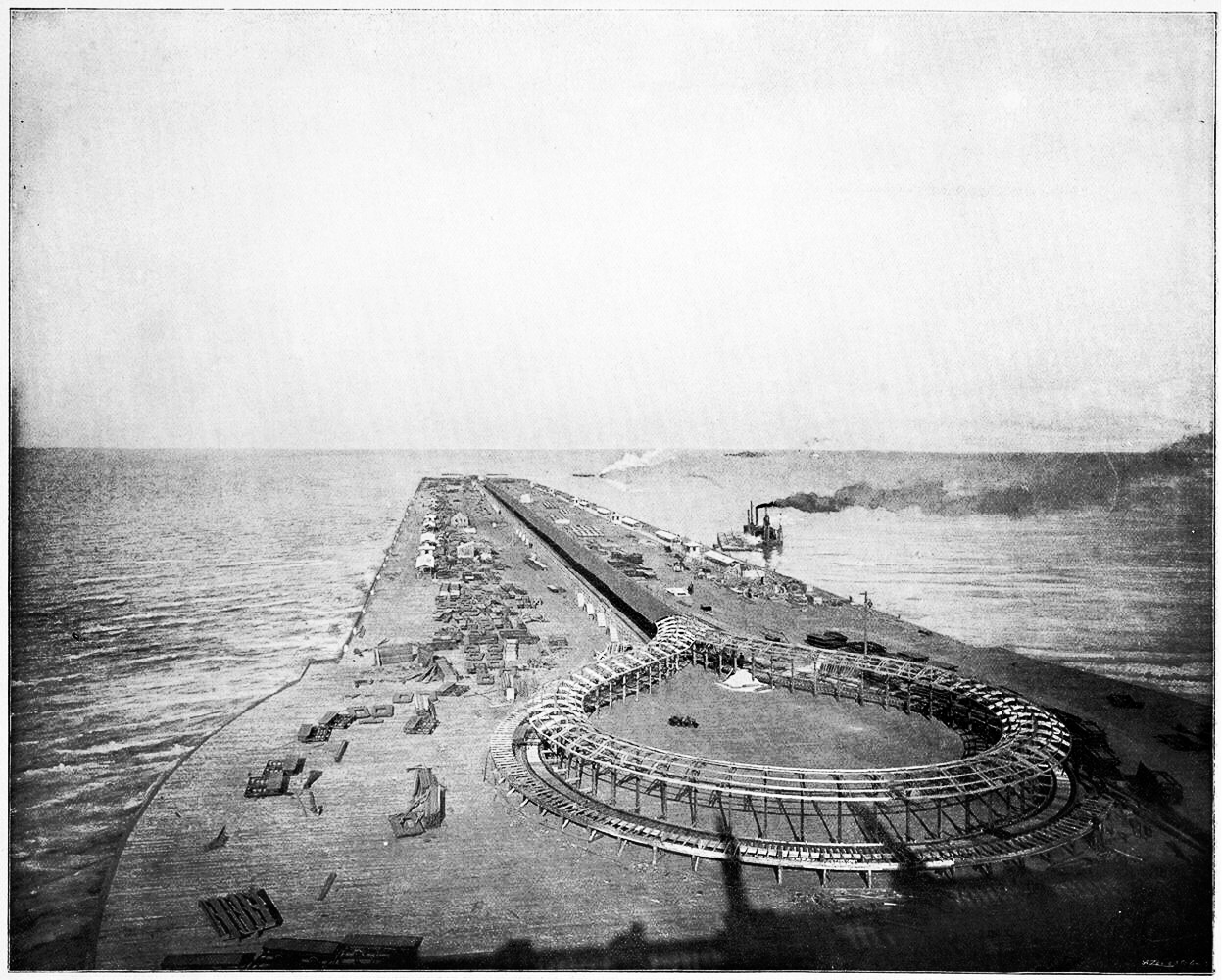
The Great Wharf, Moving Sidewalk, 1893

The first moving walkway debuted at the World's Columbian Exposition of 1893 in Chicago, Illinois, in the United States as The Great Wharf Moving Sidewalk. Designed by architect Joseph Lyman Silsbee, it had two sections: one where passengers were seated, and one where they could stand or walk. It ran in a loop down the length of a lakefront pier to a casino.

Six years later, another moving walkway was presented to the public at the 1900 Exposition Universelle in Paris as the Rue de l'Avenir. It consisted of three elevated platforms—the first stationary, the second moving at a moderate speed, and the third moving at about ten kilometers per hour (six miles per hour). These demonstrations likely inspired some of H. G. Wells' settings mentioned in the "Science Fiction" section below.

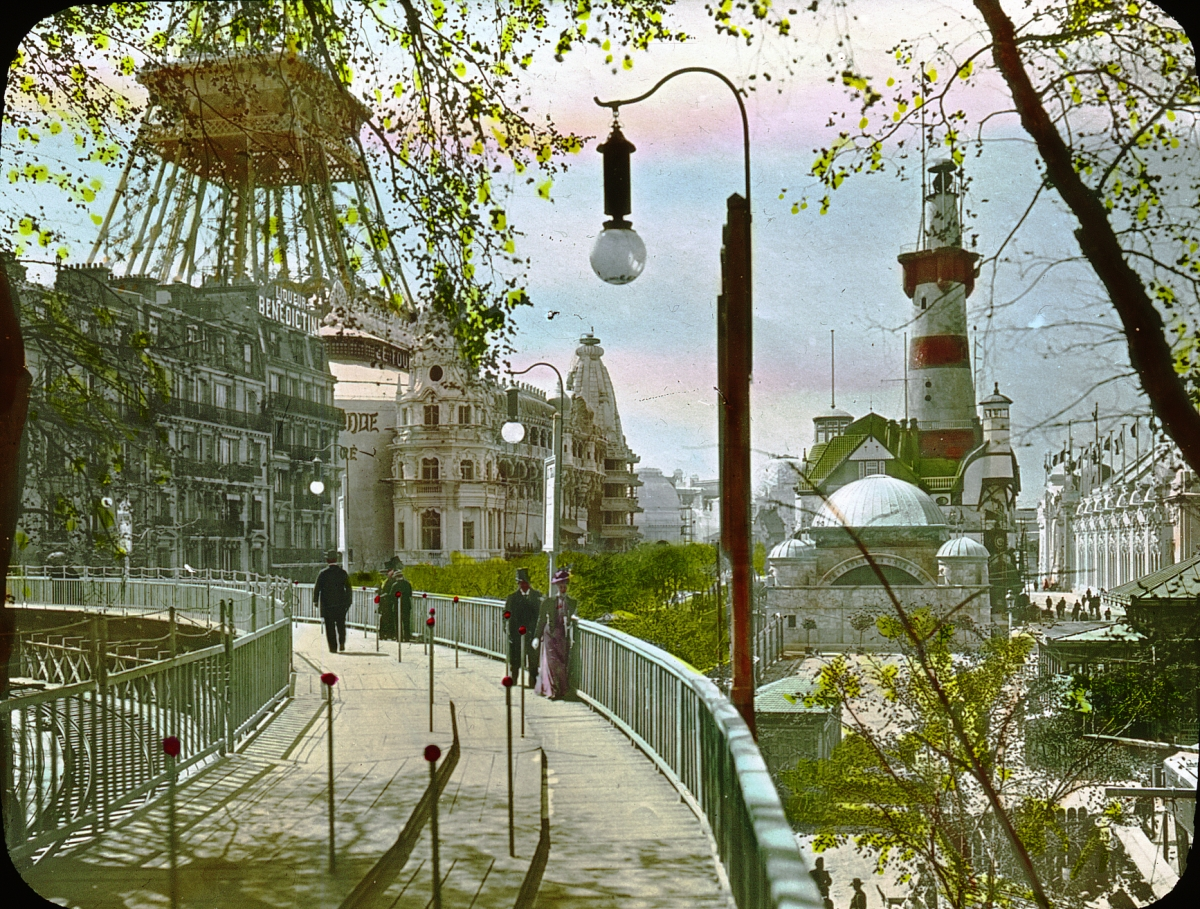
Moving sidewalk, Exposition Universelle, Paris, 1900

The Beeler Organization, a New York City consulting firm, proposed a Continuous Transit System with Sub-Surface Moving Platforms for Atlanta in 1924, with a design roughly similar to the Paris Exposition system. The proposed drive system used a linear induction motor. The system was not constructed.

The Speedwalk, the first commercial moving walkway in the United States was installed in 1954 in Jersey City, New Jersey, inside the Hudson & Manhattan Railroad Erie station at the Pavonia Terminal. Built by Goodyear, it was 84.5 meters (277 feet) long and moved up a 10% grade at 2.4 km/h (1.5 mph). It was removed a few years later when traffic patterns at the station changed.

The first moving walkway in an airport was installed in 1958 at Love Field in Dallas, Texas. On January 1, 1960, Tina Marie Brandon, age 2, was killed on the moving sidewalk.

Moving walkways generally move at a slower speed than a natural walking pace, and when people step onto one, they tend to slow their pace to compensate; thus moving walkways only minimally improve travel times and overall transport capacity.

== Designs ==
Moving walkways are built in one of two basic styles:

- Pallet type – a continuous series of flat metal plates join together to form a walkway – and are effectively identical to escalators in their construction. Most have a metal surface, though some models have a rubber surface for extra traction. The plates are one-piece, die-cast aluminium pallets, with a typical width between the walkway sides of 800–1,200 millimeters (31–47 inches). The walkway can be powered by an AC induction motor. Example speed is 0.5 metres per second (1.6 feet per second).
- Moving belt – these are generally built with mesh metal belts or rubber walking surfaces over metal rollers. The walking surface may have a solid feel or a "bouncy" feel.

Both types of moving walkway have a grooved surface to mesh with combplates at the ends. Also, nearly all moving walkways are built with moving handrails similar to those on escalators.

=== High-speed walkways ===
==== Early examples ====
In 1961, Jim Downer designed and had produced by Dunlop, the first flat running 'Travelator' for a BBC exhibition in Charing Cross underground station.

In the 1970s, Dunlop developed the Speedaway system. It was in fact an invention by Gabriel Bouladon and Paul Zuppiger of the Battelle Memorial Institute at their former Geneva, Switzerland facility. A prototype was built and demonstrated at the Battelle Institute in Geneva in the early 1970s, as can be attested by a (French-speaking) Swiss television program entitled Un Jour une Heure aired in October 1974. The great advantage of the Speedaway, as compared to the then existing systems, was that the embarking/disembarking zone was both wide and slow-moving (up to four passengers could embark simultaneously, equating to around 10,000 per hour), whereas the transportation zone was narrower and fast-moving.

The entrance to the system was like a very wide escalator, with broad metal tread plates of a parallelogram shape. After a short distance the tread plates were accelerated to one side, sliding past one another to form progressively into a narrower but faster-moving track which travelled at almost a right angle to the entry section. The passenger was accelerated through a parabolic path to a maximum design speed 15 km/h (9 mph). The experience was unfamiliar to passengers, who needed to understand how to use the system to be able to do so safely. Developing a moving hand-rail for the system presented a challenge, also solved by the Battelle team. The Speedaway was intended to be used as a stand-alone system over short distances or to form acceleration and deceleration units providing entry and exit means for a parallel conventional (but fast-running) Starglide walkway which covered longer distances. The system was still in development in 1975 but never went into commercial production.

Another attempt at an accelerated walkway in the 1980s was the TRAX (Trottoir Roulant Accéléré), which was developed by Dassault and RATP and whose prototype was installed at Invalides station in Paris. The speed at entry and exit was 3 km/h (1.9 mph), while the maximum speed was 15 km/h (9.3 mph). It was a technical failure due to its complexity, and was never commercially exploited.

In the mid-1990s, the Loderway Moving Walkway company patented and licensed a design to a number of larger moving walkway manufacturers. Trial systems were installed at Flinders Street railway station in Melbourne and Brisbane Airport Australia. These met with a positive response from the public, but no permanent installations were made. This system is of the belt type, with a sequence of belts moving at different speeds to accelerate and decelerate riders. A sequence of different speed handrails is also used.

==== Trottoir roulant rapide (TRR) ====
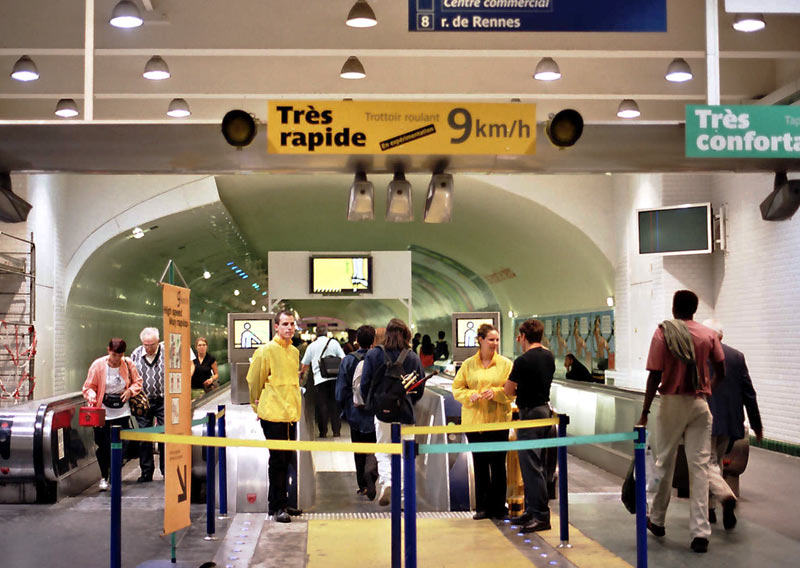
View of the TRR walkway, with staff in yellow jackets monitoring

In 2002, CNIM designed and installed the experimental, 185-metre (607 ft) trottoir roulant rapide high-speed walkway in the Montparnasse–Bienvenüe station in France. At first it operated at a speed of 12 km/h (7.5 mph) but was later reduced to 9 km/h (5.6 mph) due to safety concerns. As the design of the walkway requires riders to have at least one hand free to hold the handrail, those carrying bags, shopping, etc., or who are infirm or physically disabled, must use the ordinary walkway beside it, and staff were positioned at each end to determine who could and who could not use it.

Using this walkway is similar to using any other moving walkway, except that there are special procedures to follow when entering or exiting at either end. On entering, there is a 10-metre (33 ft) acceleration zone where the "ground" is a series of metal rollers. Riders stand still with both feet on these rollers and use one hand to hold the handrail and let it pull them so that they glide over the rollers. The idea is to accelerate the riders so that they will be traveling fast enough to step onto the moving walkway belt. Riders who try to walk on these rollers are at significant risk of falling over. Once on the walkway, riders can stand or walk as on an ordinary moving walkway. At the exit, the same technique is used to decelerate the riders. Users step onto a series of rollers which decelerate them slowly, rather than the abrupt halt which would otherwise take place.

The walkway proved to be unreliable, leading to many users losing their balance and having accidents. Consequently, it was removed by RATP in 2011 after nine years in service, being replaced with a standard moving walkway.

==== ThyssenKrupp ACCEL ====
Video of the "ThyssenKrupp Express Walkway", Toronto Pearson International Airport

In 2007, ThyssenKrupp installed two high-speed walkways in Terminal 1 at Toronto Pearson International Airport. They connect the international gates in the newly opened Pier F, located at one end of the pier, with the rest of the terminal. One walkway serves departing passengers travelling towards the gates and the other serves arriving passengers travelling towards the terminal. The airport decided to decommission the walkway in 2020.

The walkway's pallet-type design accelerates and decelerates users in a manner that eliminates many of the safety risks generated by the moving belt-type used in Paris, making it suitable for use by people of all ages and sizes regardless of their health condition. The pallets "intermesh" with a comb and slot arrangement. They expand out of each other when speeding up, and compress into each other when slowing down. The handrails work in a similar manner, and because of this, there is no need to hold the handrails when entering or exiting the walkway. It moves at roughly 2 km/h (1.2 mph) when riders step onto it and speeds up to approximately 7 km/h (4.3 mph), which it remains at until near the end, where it slows back down.

ThyssenKrupp continued development of that product, and the result is Accel, an upgraded version of Express Walkway, offering speeds of up to 12 km/h (7.5 mph), which is 5 km/h (3.1 mph) faster than of Express Walkway, and is the same speed as of original version of TRR walkway.

=== Inclined moving walkways ===
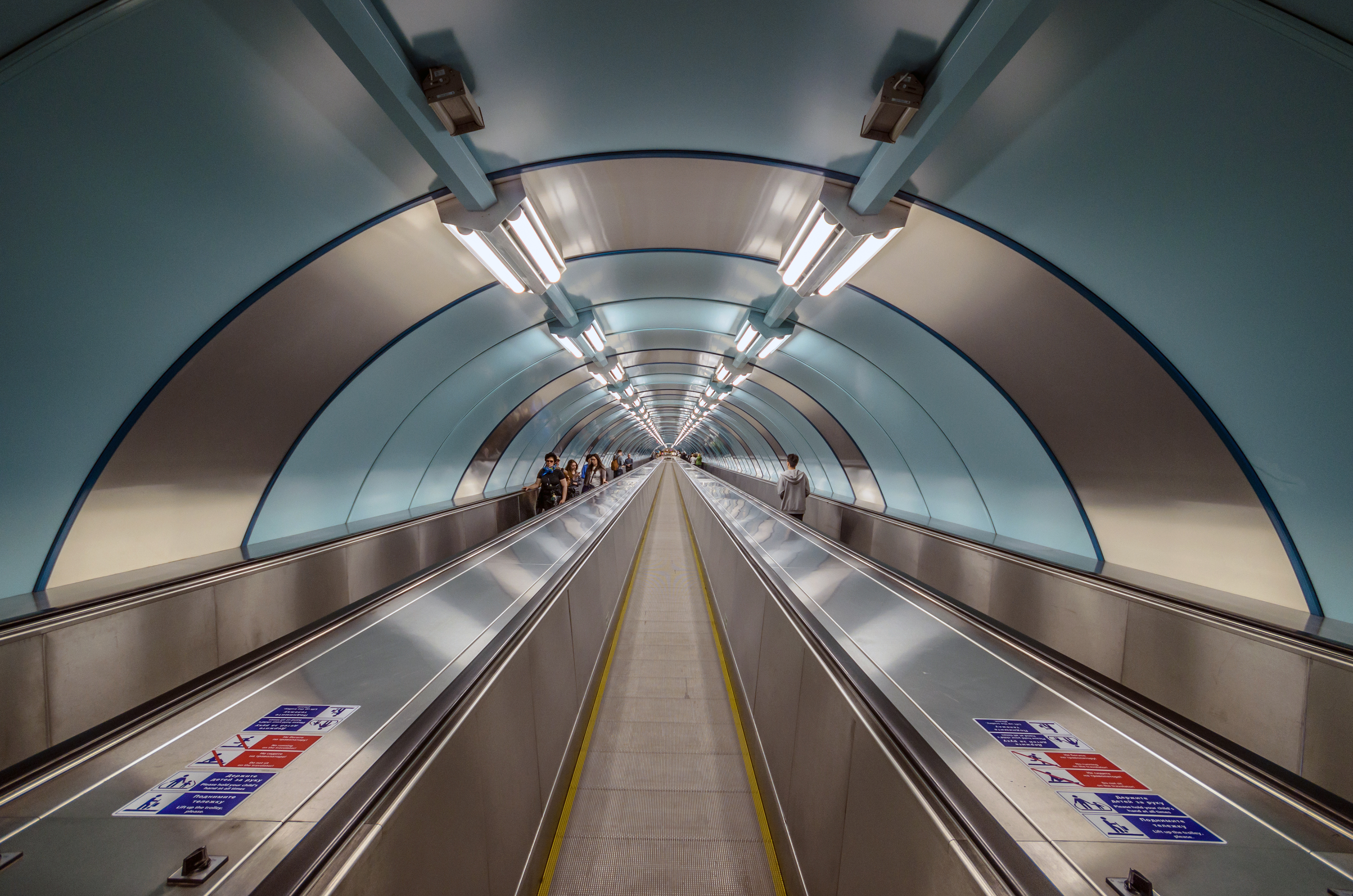
An inclined travelator at Sportivnaya station on the Saint Petersburg Metro, Russia

An inclined moving walkway is a type of vertical transportation used in airports and supermarkets to move people to another floor with the convenience of an elevator (namely, that people can take along their suitcase trolley, shopping cart, or baby carriage) and the capacity of an escalator. Conflicting sources name either Goodyear Tire or Canadian elevator company Turnbull as the inventor of the inclined moving walkway.

Some department stores instead use shopping cart conveyors to transport passengers and their carts between store levels simultaneously. Walmart in Canada require users of wheelchairs and other mobility aids to be accompanied by shop staff when using their moving walkways, which they refer to as 'movators'. This policy has been superseded in some stores by the installation of elevators.

Shopping carts used on inclined moving walkways usually have wheels specially designed to get caught in the grooves of the walkway's tread when rolled onto the walkway, thereby preventing the cart from rolling down. The wheels are lifted off the tread by the landing plate at the end.

== Applications ==
Moving walkways are frequently found in the following locations:

=== Airports ===
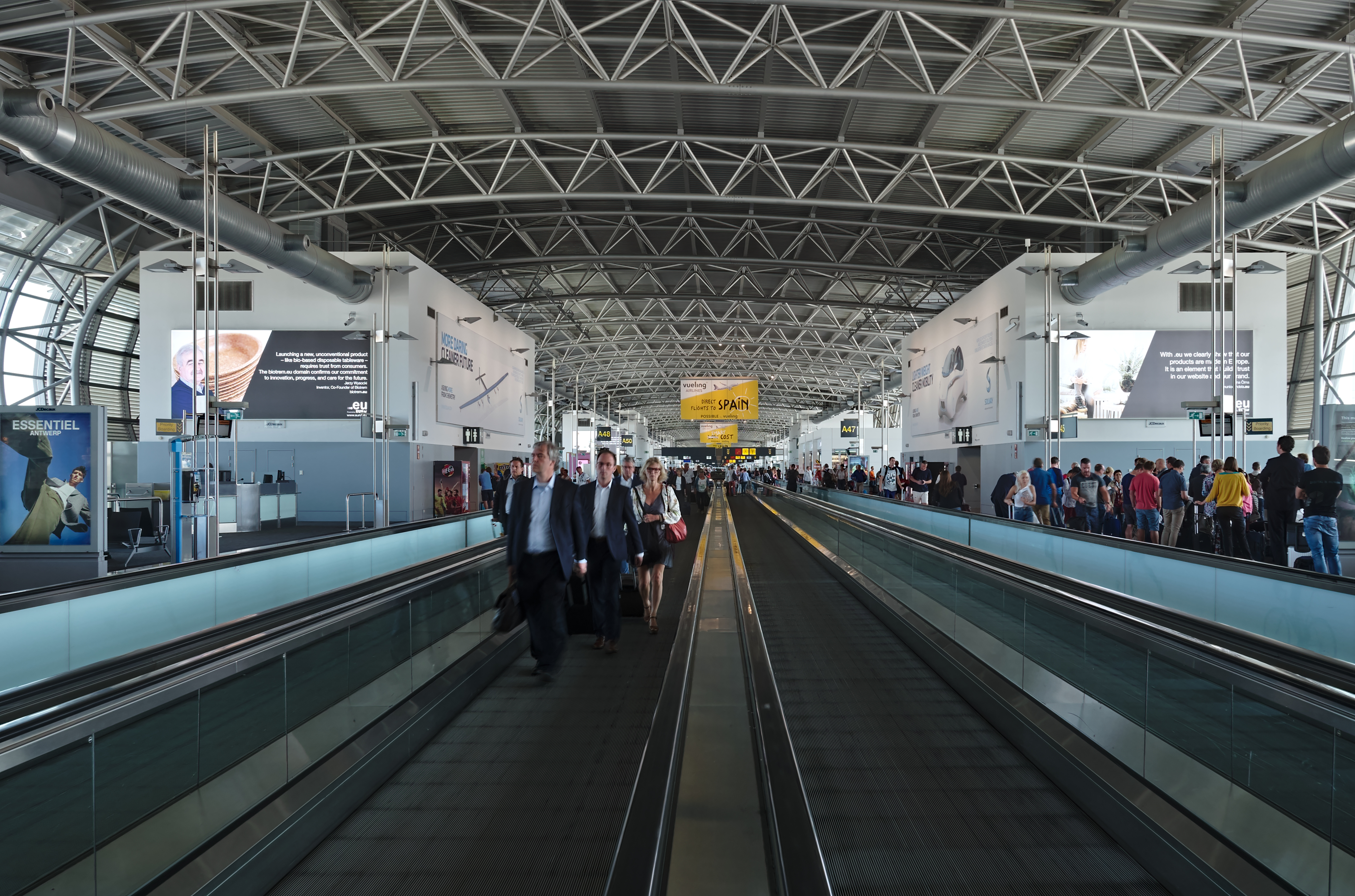
Moving walkway in the A-gates of Brussels Airport, Belgium

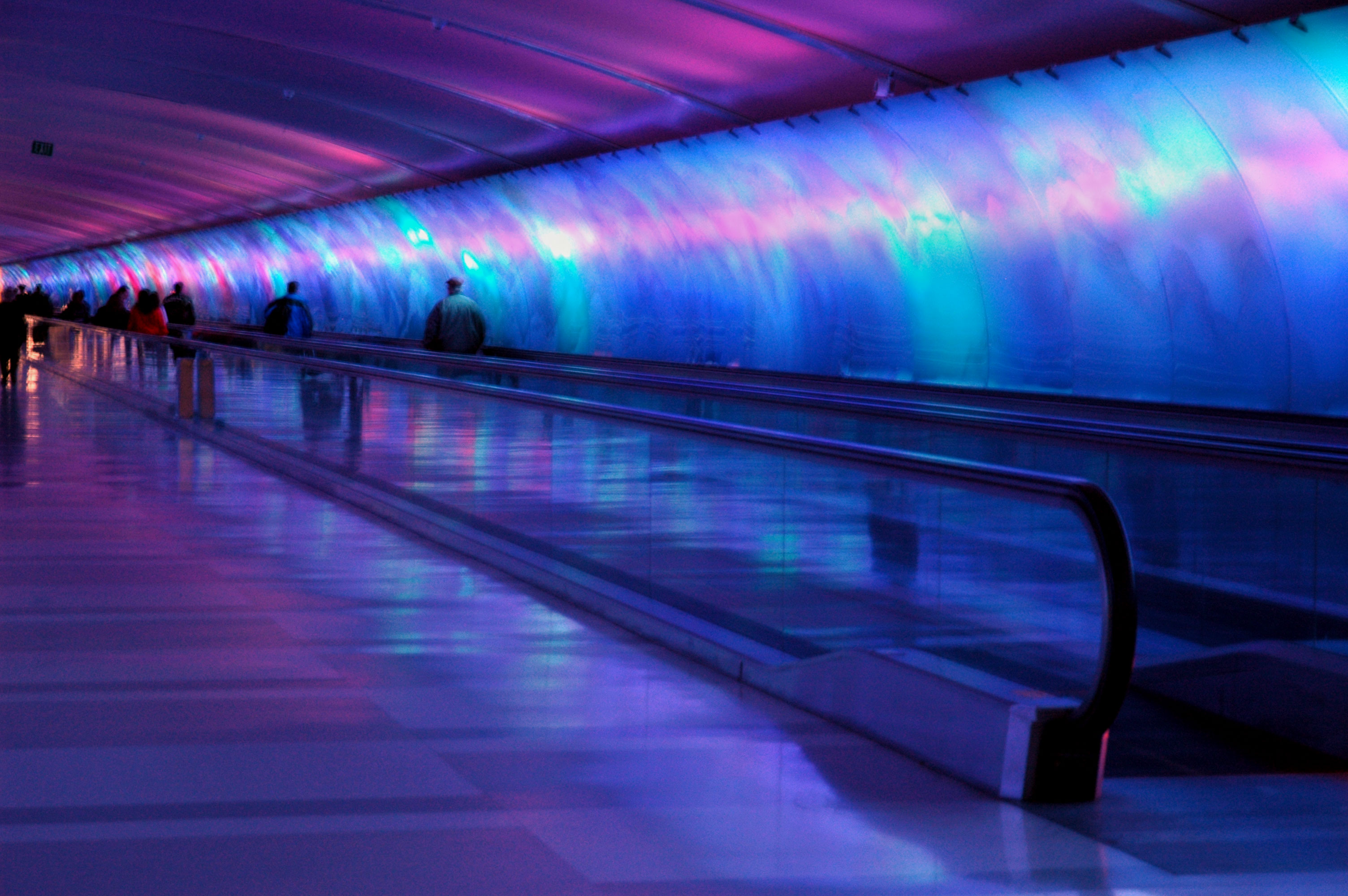
Moving walkway at Detroit's Detroit Metropolitan Wayne County Airport, Wayne County, Michigan, United States

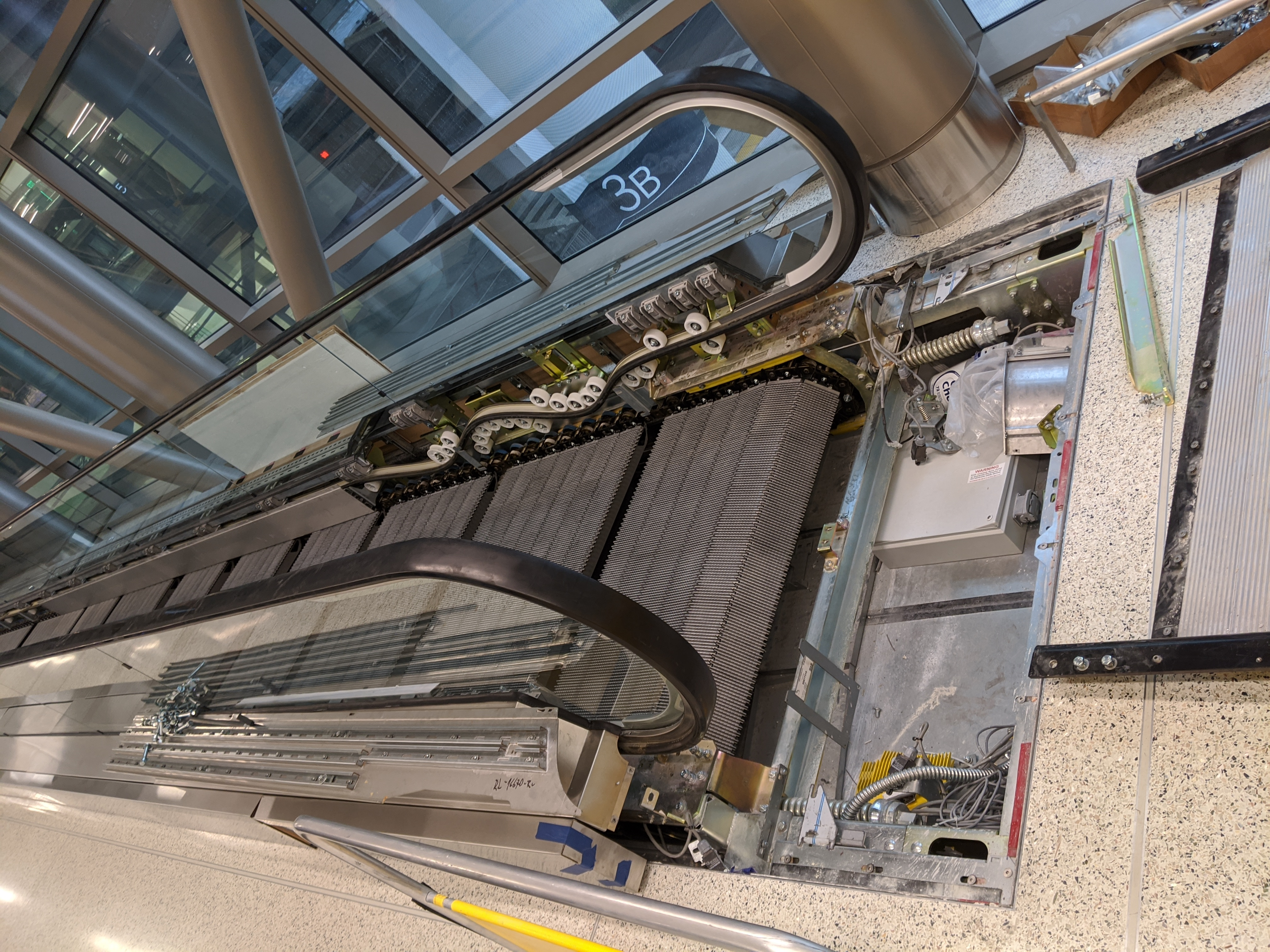
A moving walkway opened up for maintenance at Salt Lake City International Airport, United States

Moving walkways are commonly used in larger airports, as passengers – often with heavy luggage in tow – typically need to walk considerable distances, making them attractive for improving the passenger experience. Moving walkways may be used:

- in passageways between concourses and the terminal
- within particularly long concourses
- as a connector between terminals, or
- as access to a parking facility or a ground transport station.

Of particular note is Terminal 1 of Charles de Gaulle Airport in Paris, France, which has several moving walkways inside a series of futuristic suspended tubes.

=== Public transport ===
Moving walkways can be useful for lengthier connections between lines or platforms; for example:

- London Underground (London): on the Waterloo & City line terminus at Bank station and on the Jubilee Line at Waterloo
- Glasgow Subway (Glasgow): from Buchanan Street subway station to Queen Street railway station
- MTR (Hong Kong): between Central and Hong Kong stations on Hong Kong Island, and between Tsim Sha Tsui and East Tsim Sha Tsui stations in Kowloon
- MRT (Singapore): in Bugis, Dhoby Ghaut, Serangoon, Botanic Gardens, Orchard, Woodlands North, Outram Park and Changi Airport stations
- Chongqing Rail Transit/CRT(Chongqing): Moving walkways inside Jiaochangkou station's interchange channel for transfers between Line 1 and Line 2.
- Montreal Metro, the entrance of the Beaudry station
- Caracas Metro, in the connection between Plaza Venezuela station of Lines 1 and 3, and Zona Rental station of Line 4.

A moving walkway was formerly part of the complex in Spadina subway station in Toronto, Ontario, Canada. Installed in 1978, it reduced the travel time needed to transfer between the platforms on the Bloor–Danforth and the Yonge–University–Spadina lines. They were removed in 2004 and patrons are now required to walk between the stations. As of 2025, the "PLEASE HOLD HANDRAIL" warning tiled into the wall where the walkway was is still visible.

=== Urban areas ===
Moving walkways have been heavily incorporated into Hong Kong's system of Central–Mid-Levels escalators.

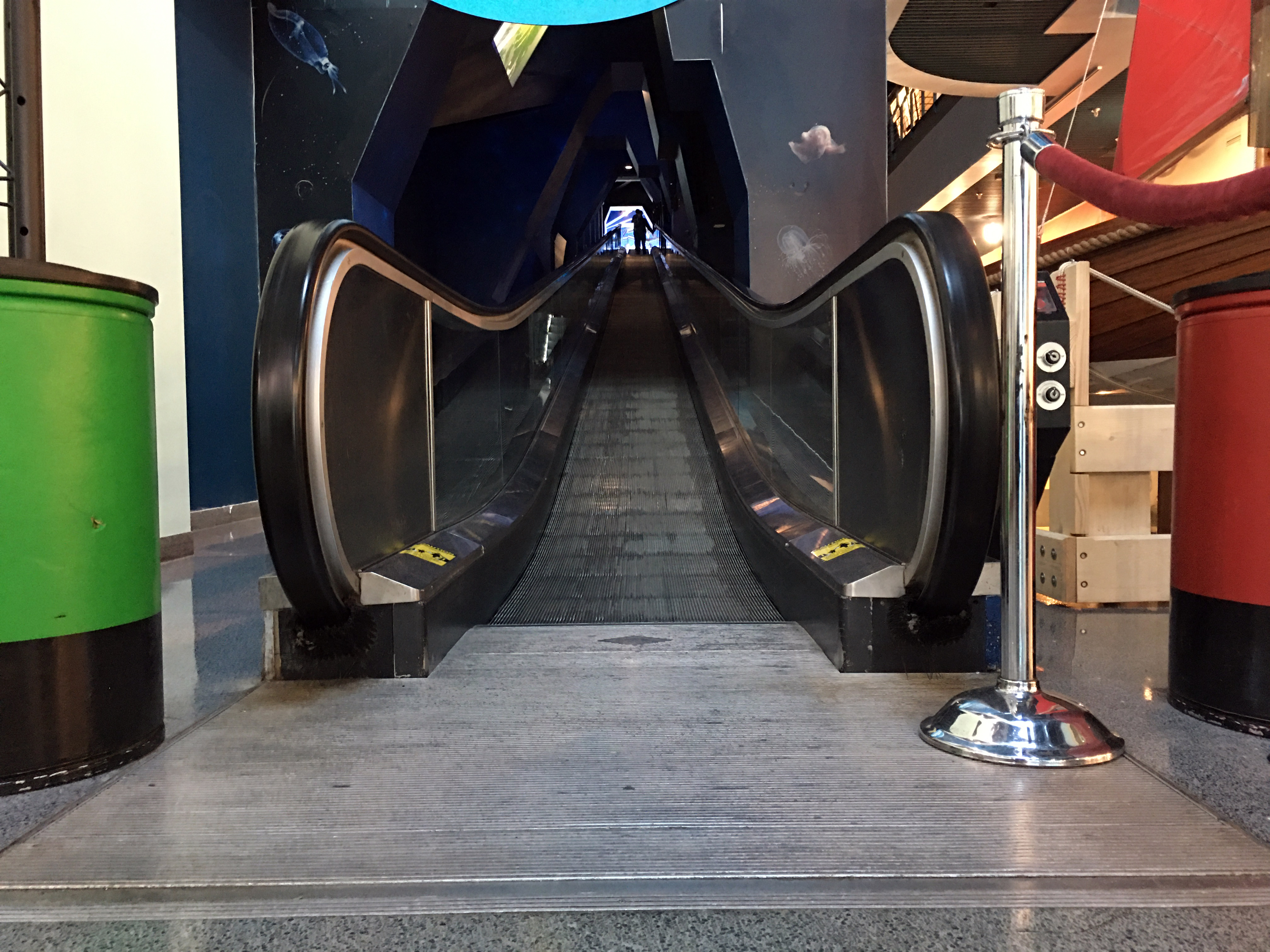
Inclined moving walkway at Nauticus in Norfolk, Virginia, United States. This one was manufactured by Orenstein & Koppel, and is the only known inclined walkway by the company.

=== Museums ===
Moving sidewalks may be used:

- to ensure that a museum exhibit is viewed in a certain sequence
- to provide a particular aesthetic effect in an exhibit
- to make sure the crowd moves through at a reliable pace.

The 1975–76 American Freedom Train did this with a moving walkway inside each successive railroad car, thus maximizing the number of people who could view the interior exhibits in the limited time the train was stopped in each town.

The National Gallery of Art in Washington, DC, US, uses a moving walkway to connect the two main buildings.

The Tower of London in London, England, uses a moving walkway where visitors are passing the cabinets which contain the Crown Jewels.

=== Zoos ===
Similar to museums, some zoological park exhibits have a moving walkway to ease guests through an animal display or habitat. An aquarium at the Mall of America does this with a moving walkway made up of specially rounded pallets that enable it to change directions en route. The San Diego Zoo uses moving ramps to help guests ascend steep grades.

=== Theme parks ===
Some amusement park rides, such as continuous-motion dark rides like Disney's Omnimover rides, make use of a moving sidewalk to assist passengers in boarding and disembarking rides and attractions. Some examples include:

- the Ultra Twister, a roller coaster at the now closed Astroworld in Houston, Texas, had a moving walkway with no handrail for passengers to step on prior to boarding their car. The walkway would move at the same speed as the approaching cars, allowing passengers completing the ride to step off and for boarding passengers to enter the car. An announcement played "Moving conveyor, please watch your step" to warn of the moving walkway.
- the exit from the Space Mountain attraction at Walt Disney World Resort formerly had a long moving walkway which changed inclination multiple times. As of November 15, 2018, it has been converted to conventional flooring.
- the exit from the Pirates of the Caribbean attraction at Walt Disney World has an inclined moving walkway leading towards a gift shop.
- the Tomorrowland Transit Authority PeopleMover attraction at Walt Disney World Resort has two inclined moving walkways to carry guests between the ground level and the attraction's load and unload stations, where guests step onto another moving walkway that is one of the few circular moving walkways

=== Theatrical sets ===
The Phantom of the Opera by Andrew Lloyd Webber uses a travelator in the number "The Phantom of the Opera" (act one, scene six), to give the illusion the Phantom and Christine are traveling the catacombs below the Paris Opera House a great distance to the Phantom's lair on the subterranean lake.

=== Ski resorts ===
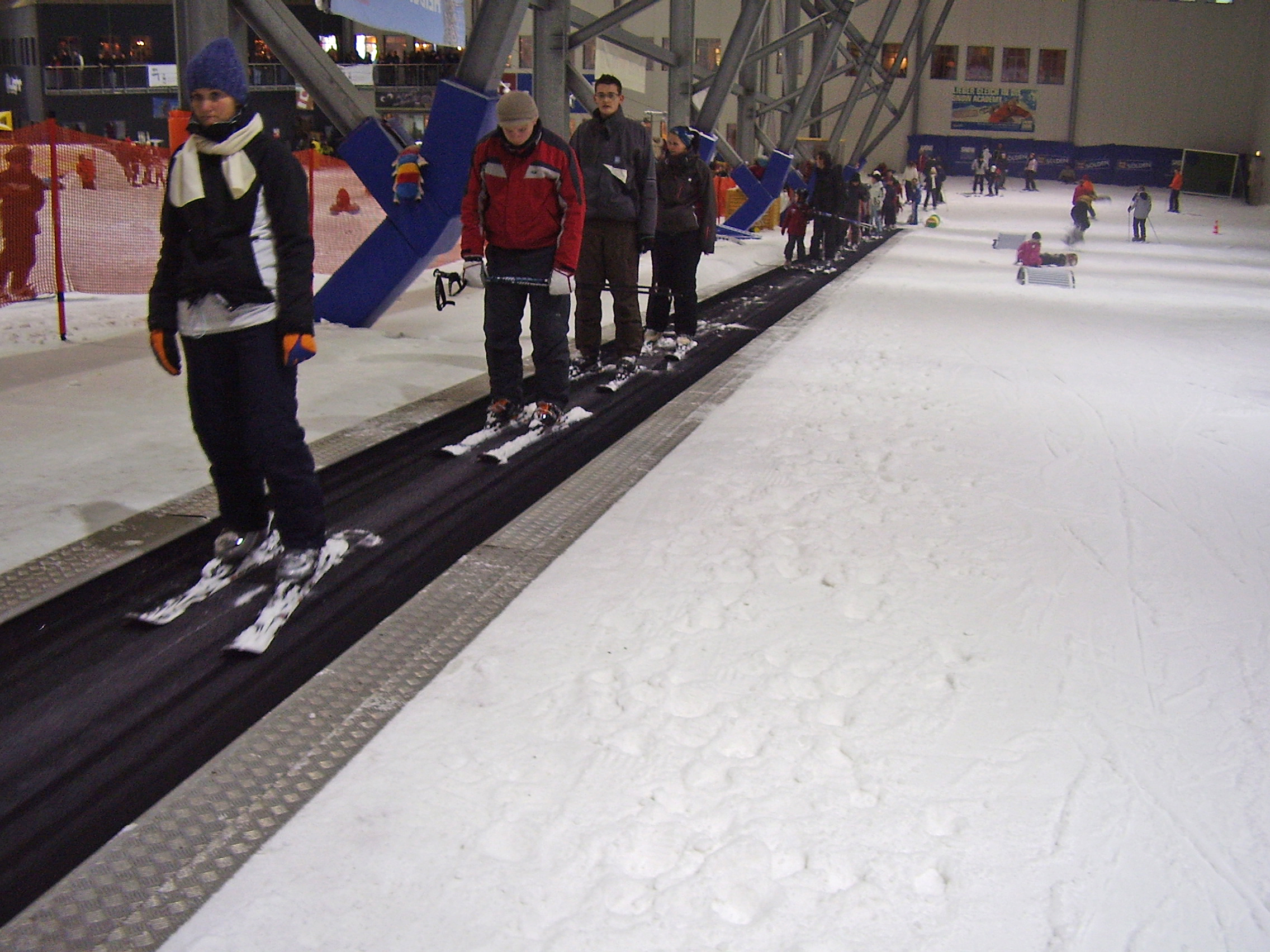
Skiers on a moving walkway

Moving walkways known as magic carpets are also used in ski resorts. Skiers can place their skis on the walkway, which is designed to provide a strong level of grip. Since the walkways cannot be too steep and are slow compared to other aerial lifts, they are used especially for beginners or to transport people over a short uphill distance, such as to reach a restaurant or another lift's station. Moving walkways can also be found at the entrances of chairlifts to help passengers in the boarding process.

=== Retail ===
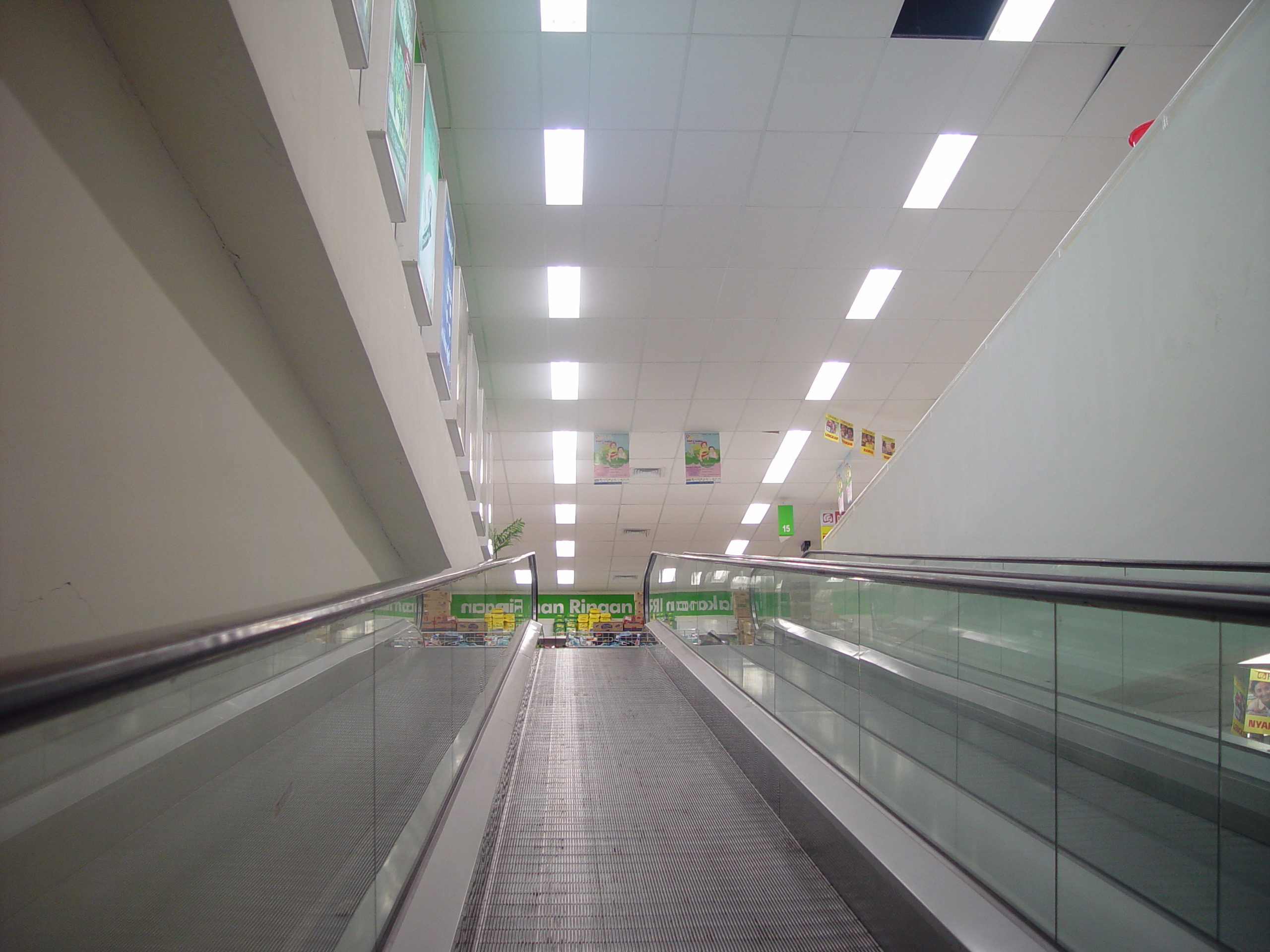
Travelators at a supermarket in Jakarta, Indonesia

In the UK, inclined travelators are used in stores, including Asda, B&M Bargains, IKEA, Marks & Spencer, Morrisons, Sainsbury's, and Tesco. For example, Tesco in Aberystwyth uses six inclined travelators (three up, three down in a criss-cross layout) to transport shoppers and their trolleys between the store, the rooftop car park and the under-store car park.

In the United States, inclined walkways can be found in certain IKEA, Menards, Publix, H-E-B, Wegmans, Costco Wholesale, and Whole Foods Market stores.

== Safety ==
When in operation, travelators have similar safety risks to traditional escalators, with the most common injuries on travelators being caused by tripping or falling over, and thus typically have similar guidelines to escalators to use them safely.

== Science fiction ==
The concept of a megalopolis based on high-speed walkways is common in science fiction. The first works set in such a location are "A Story of the Days To Come" (1897) and When The Sleeper Wakes (1899) (also republished as The Sleeper Awakes), written by H. G. Wells, which take place in a future London. Thirty years later, the silent film Metropolis (1927) depicted several scenes showing moving sidewalks and escalators between skyscrapers at high levels. Later, the short story "The Roads Must Roll" (1940), written by Robert A. Heinlein, depicts the risk of a transportation strike in a society based on similar-speed sidewalks. The novel is part of the Future History saga, and takes place in 1976. Isaac Asimov, in the novel The Caves of Steel (1954) and its sequels in the Robot series, uses similar enormous underground cities with a similar sidewalk system. The period described is about the year 5,000.

In each of these cases, there is a massive network of parallel moving belts, the inner ones moving faster. Passengers are screened from wind, and there are chairs and even shops on the belt. In the Heinlein work the fast lane runs at 100 mph (160 km/h), and the first "mechanical road" was built in 1960 between Cincinnati and Cleveland. The relative speed of two adjacent belts is 8.0 km/h (5 mph) (in the book, the fast lane stops while the second lane keeps running at 153 km/h (95 mph)). In the Wells and Asimov works there are more steps in the speed scale and the speeds are less extreme.

In Arthur C. Clarke's novel, Against the Fall of Night (later rewritten as The City and the Stars) the Megacity of Diaspar is interwoven with "moving ways" which, unlike Heinlein's conveyor belts, are solid floors that can mysteriously move as a fluid. In the novel, Clarke writes,

An engineer of the ancient world would have gone slowly mad trying to understand how a solid roadway could be fixed at both ends while its centre travelled at a hundred miles an hour... The corridor still inclined upwards, and in a few hundred feet had curved through a complete right-angle. But only logic knew this: to the senses it was now as if one were being hurried along an absolutely level corridor. The fact that he was in reality travelling up a vertical shaft thousands of feet deep gave Alvin no sense of insecurity, for a failure of the polarizing field was unthinkable.

In his non-fiction book Profiles of the Future, Arthur C. Clarke mentions moving sidewalks but made of some sort of anisotropic material that could flow in the direction of travel but hold the weight of a person. The fluid would have the advantage of offering a continuous gradient of speed from the edge to edge so there would be no jumps, and simply moving from side to side would effect a change in speed.

In the Strugatsky brothers' Noon Universe, the worldwide network of moving roads is one of the first megaprojects undertaken on newly united Earth, before the advent of FTL starships and its consequences turned everybody's attention to the stars. These roads there are quasiliving organisms similar to Clarke's description and were used for both local commuting and long-distance non-urgent transport until their use was eclipsed by an instant teleportation network.

The animated TV series The Jetsons depicts moving walkways everywhere, even in private homes.

=== Slidewalk ===
A slidewalk is a fictional moving pavement structurally sound enough to support buildings and large populations of travelers. Adjacent slidewalks moving at different rates could let travelers accelerate to great speeds. The term is also used colloquially for a conventional moving walkway.

They were imagined by science fiction writer H. G. Wells in When the Sleeper Wakes. Robert A. Heinlein made them the instruments of social upheaval in the 1940 short story The Roads Must Roll. Isaac Asimov, in his Robot series, imagined slidewalks as the potential method of transportation of practically the entire urban population on Earth, with expressways moving at up to 95 km/h (60 mph) equipped with seating accommodations for long-distance travel, and with slower subsidiary tracks branching off from the main lines. Arthur C. Clarke also used them in The City and the Stars. Larry Niven used them in Ringworld and Flatlander. Slidewalks figure prominently in The Jetsons.

== See also ==
- Conveyor pulley
- Charles E. Downs and Joseph F. Fitzpatrick
- Escalator
- Moving floor
- Shopping cart conveyor
- Treadmill
- Conveyor belt
- Ski simulator
