= Rue de l'Avenir =

Moving walkway at the 1900 Exposition Universelle

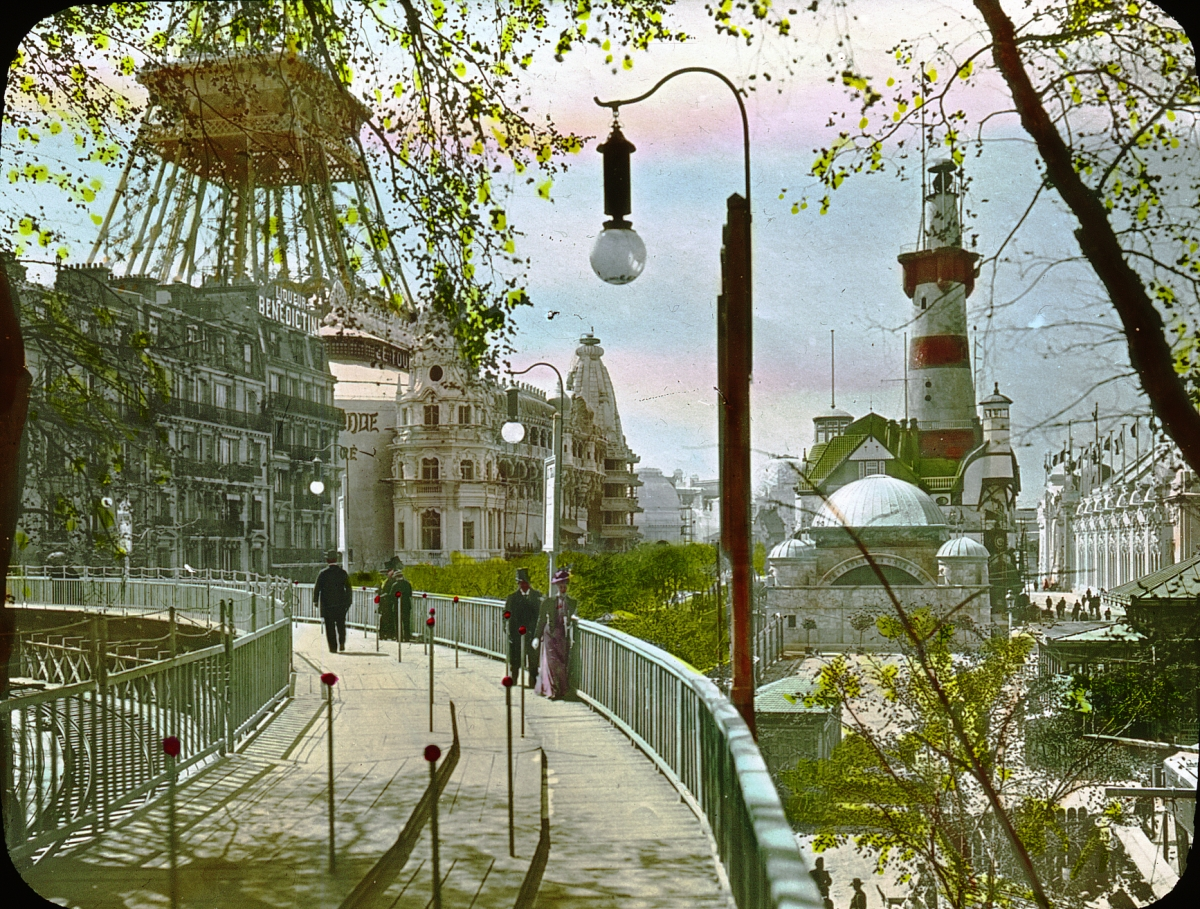
The moving sidewalk near the Eiffel Tower.

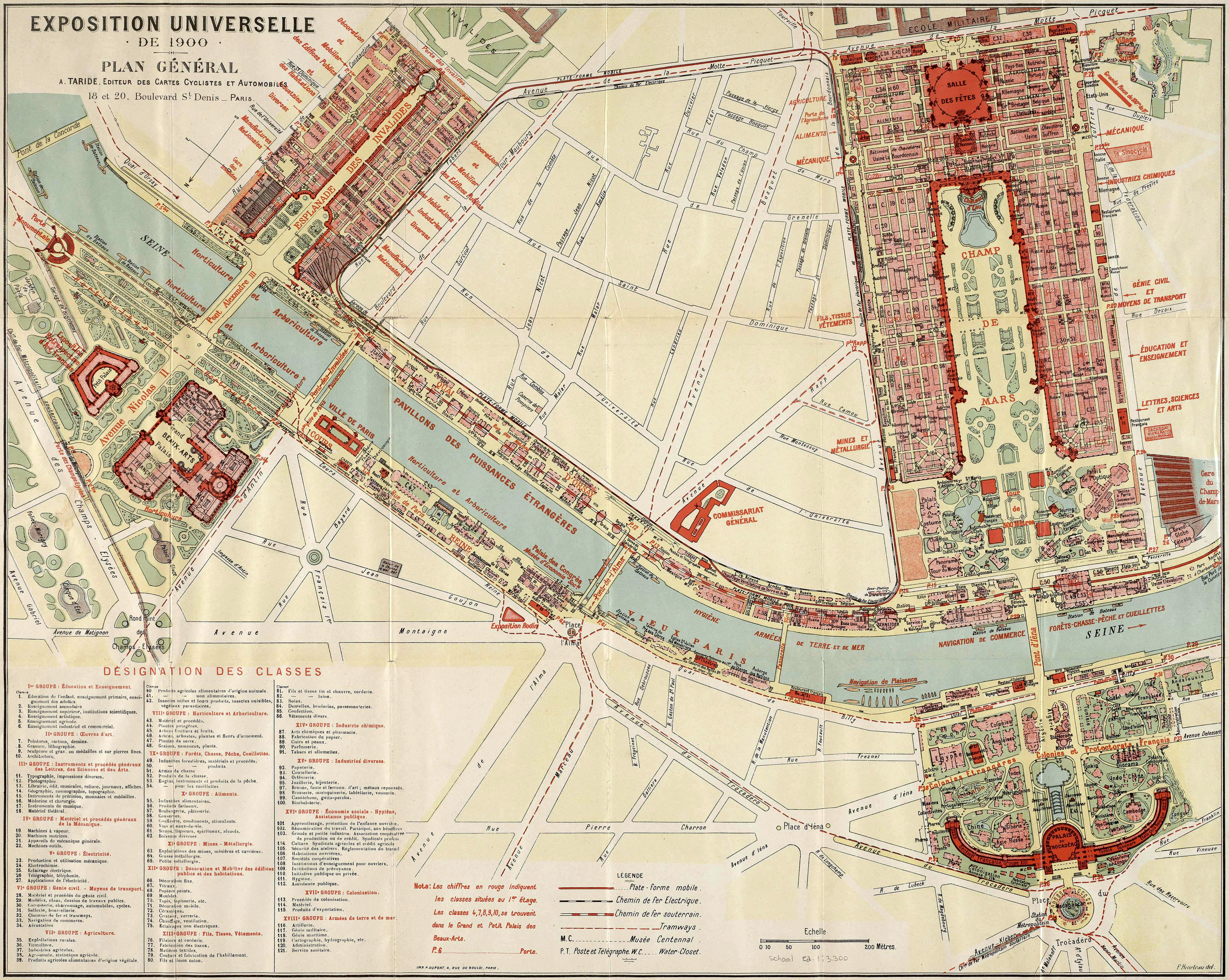
Map of the 1900 Paris Exposition, with the route of the moving sidewalk marked in red.

The rue de l'Avenir (French pronunciation: [ʁy d(ə) lavniʁ], lit. Street of the future) was an electric moving walkway installed at the 1900 Exposition Universelle in Paris. It ran along the edge of the Exposition site, from the Esplanade of Les Invalides to the Champ de Mars, passing through nine stations along the way, where passengers could board. It was designed by architect Joseph Lyman Silsbee and engineer Max E. Schmidt, designers of The Great Wharf Moving Sidewalk installed at the 1893 World's Fair in Chicago, the first-ever moving walkway.

== Features ==
The moving sidewalk was a very popular and useful attraction, given the large size of the Exposition. It consisted of a fixed platform and two mobile platforms, on a viaduct 7 metres (23 ft) above the ground level, that covered a 3.5 kilometres (2.2 mi) loop around the exhibition site with nine stations. The passengers stepped from the platform onto an access sidewalk 80 centimetres (31 in) wide traveling at 4.2 kilometres per hour (2.6 mph), then onto a faster sidewalk 2 metres (6 ft 7 in) wide moving at 8.5 kilometres per hour (5.3 mph). The sidewalks had posts with handles which passengers could hold onto, or they could walk. The fast sidewalk made it possible to complete the loop in 26 minutes. The fare was an average of fifty French franc centimes.

The sidewalk went counterclockwise along the following circle route: Esplanade des Invalides along the Rue Fabert, Le Rue des Nations along the Quai d'Orsay, the Champ de Mars along the Avenue de La Bourdonnais and the Avenue de La Motte-Picquet to connect again with the Rue Fabert. It could simultaneously accommodate 14,000 people; during the afternoon of Easter Day, it carried 70,000 people, while the busiest tram and bus lines carried little more than 40,000 passengers a day on average.

A Decauville electric train followed the same route, running at a maximum speed of 17 kilometres per hour (11 mph) in the opposite direction to the moving sidewalk. The rail track was sometimes at 7 meters high like the moving sidewalks, sometimes at ground level and sometimes underground.

== Mechanism ==
The originality of the system of movable sidewalks, adopted for the 1900 Exhibition, lay in the fact that the propulsion components were absolutely distinct from the supporting and running components. The propulsion was provided for each sidewalk by a roller acting by friction on a beam fixed along the center line of the trucks and these were, two by two, provided with two pairs of wheels carried and guided by side rails established under the floors.

Electric power was supplied by the Moulineaux factory of the Compagnie de l'Ouest, and was transformed into direct current because of the ease of starting and speed adjustment it provides. This current was brought to the platforms by nine cables and received on a distribution board which enabled the walkway to run in either direction, or to stop immediately.

== Gallery ==
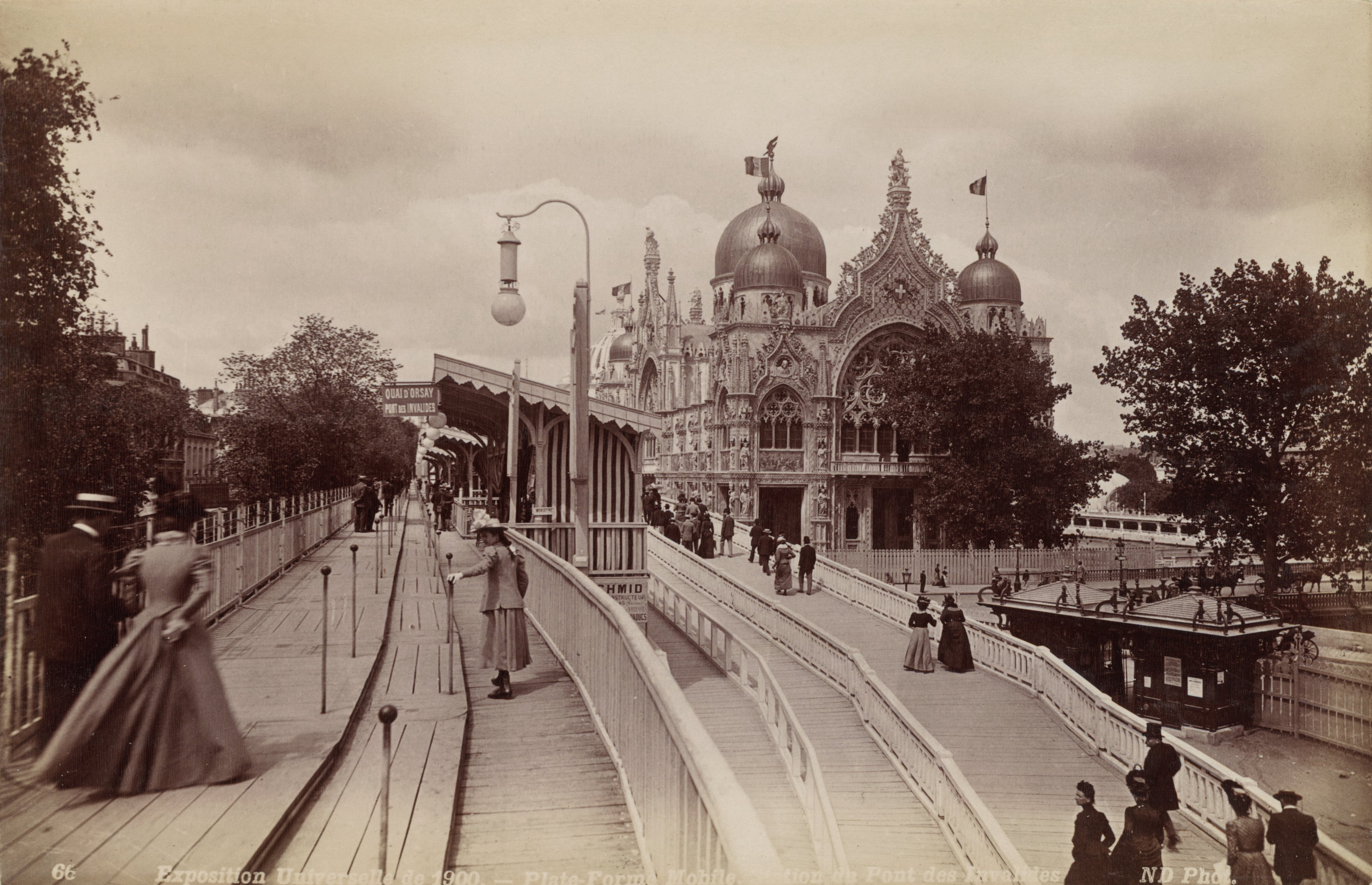
Pont des Invalides station next to the Pavilion of Italy

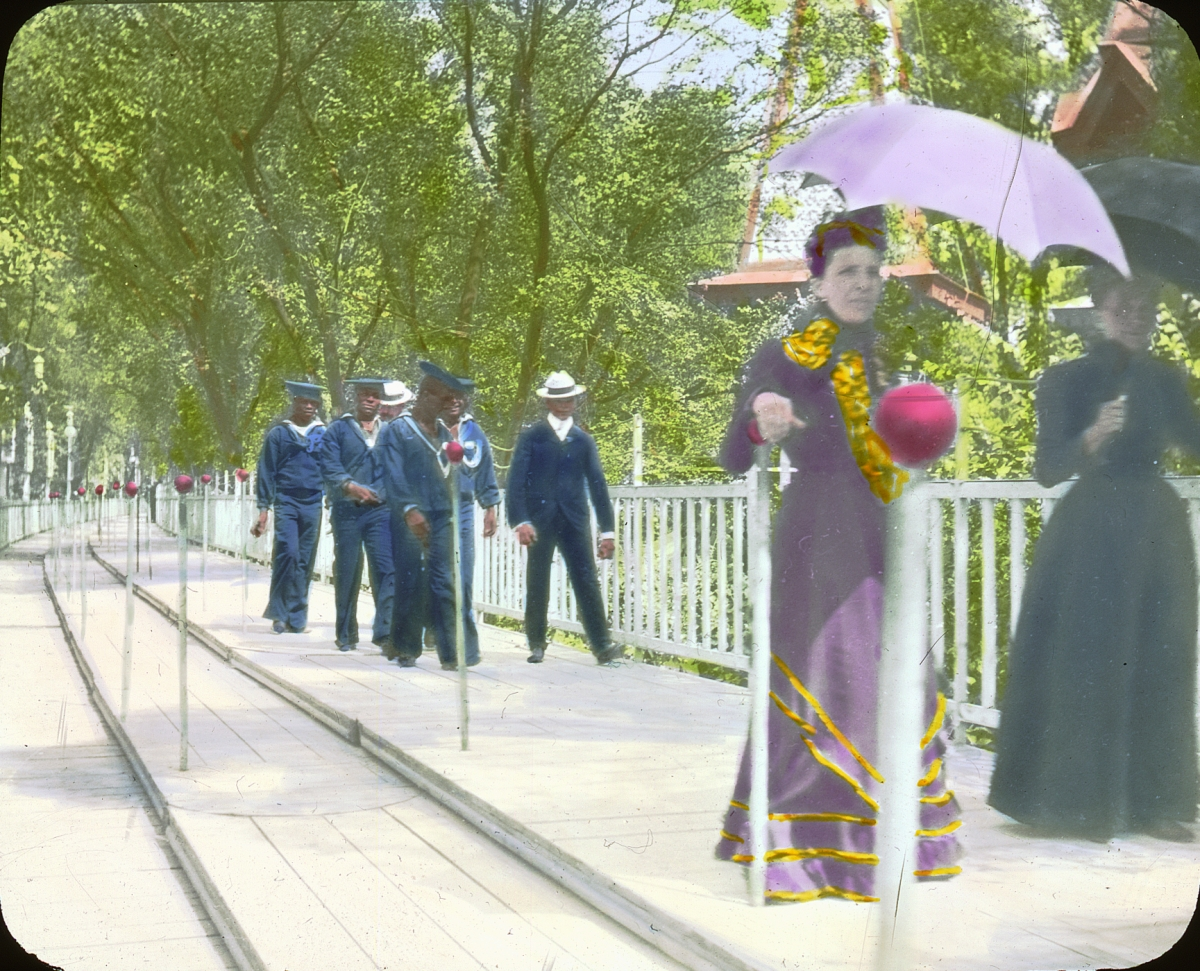
The three-part moving sidewalk in use.

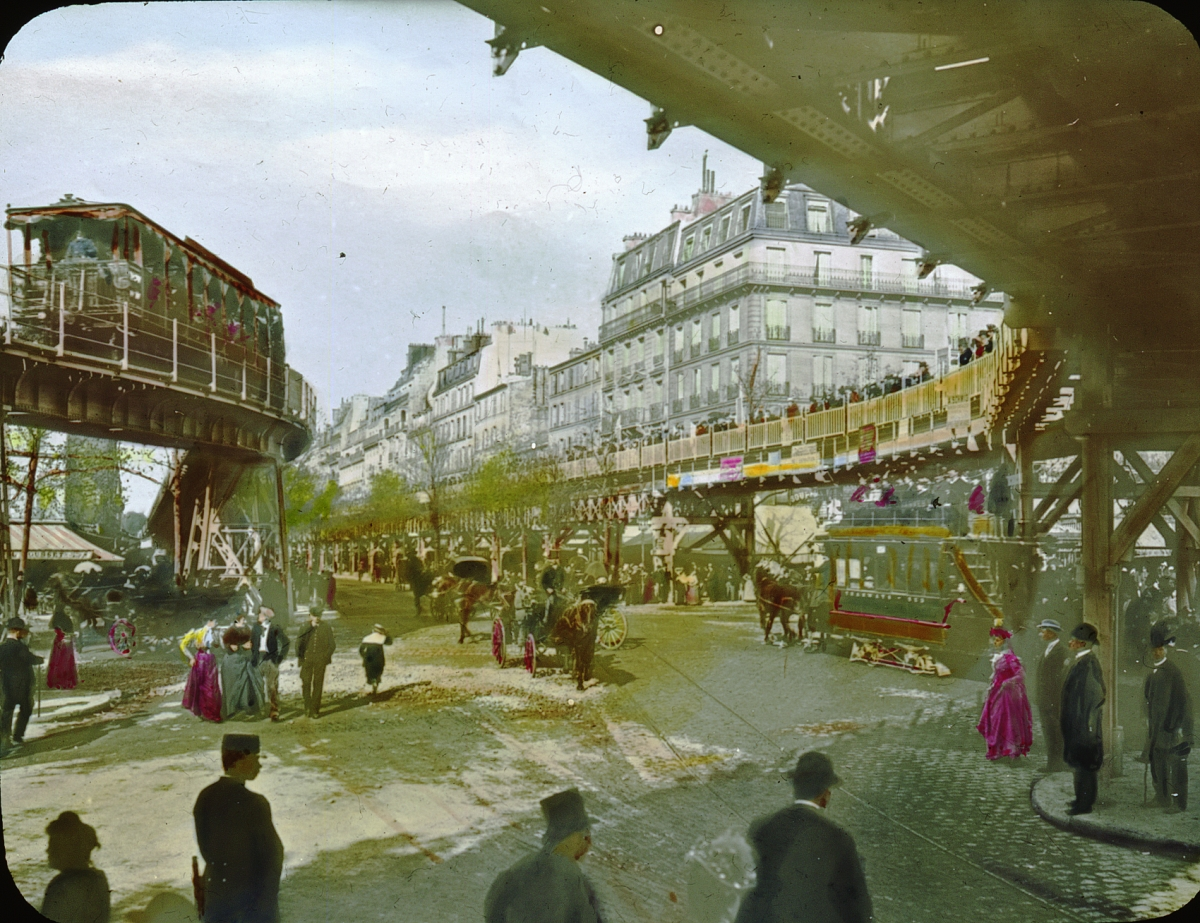
Viaducts of the moving sidewalk (right) and the electric train (left)

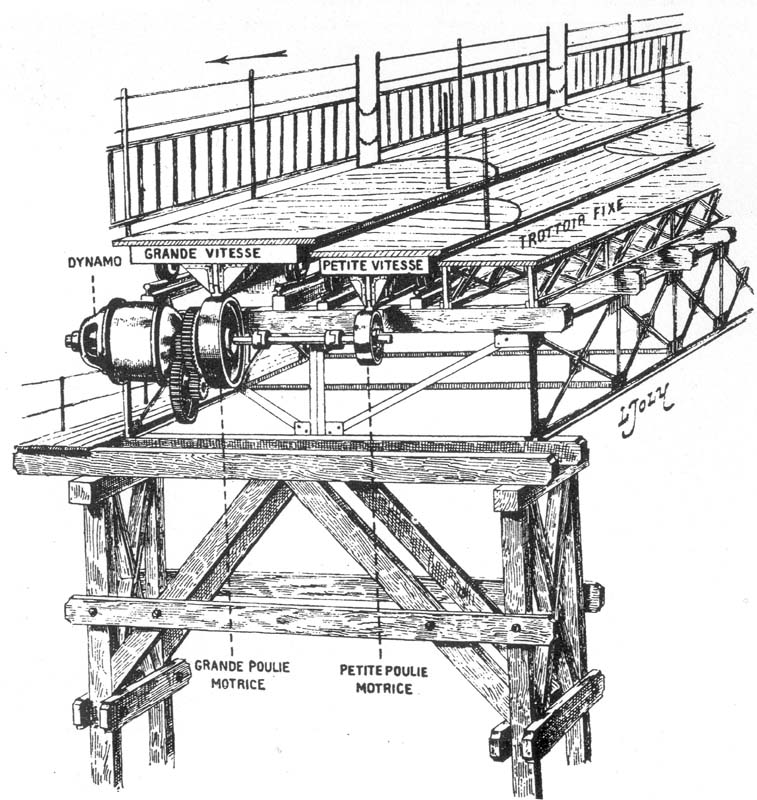
Mechanism of the moving sidewalk

Panoramic view of the moving sidewalk at the Paris Exposition by Thomas Edison
