= Knightfall =

Knightfall may refer to:

== Television ==
- Knightfall (TV series), an American historical fiction drama television series
- "Knight Fall", an episode of the sixth season of House
- "Knightfall" (Once Upon a Time), an episode of the seventh season of Once Upon a Time

== Other uses ==
- Knightfall (character), a fictional DC Comics character associated with Batgirl
- Operation: Knightfall, the codename for the attack on the Jedi Temple during Star Wars: Episode III – Revenge of the Sith
- Knightfall (Silent Images album), 2016
- Knightfall (Grailknights album), 2018
- Batman: Knightfall, a 1993–1994 Batman story arc published by DC Comics
  - Batman: Knightfall (film), adult animated film trilogy based on the comic book story arc

== See also ==
- Nightfall (disambiguation)
