= Shopping cart conveyor =

Device used in multi-level retail stores

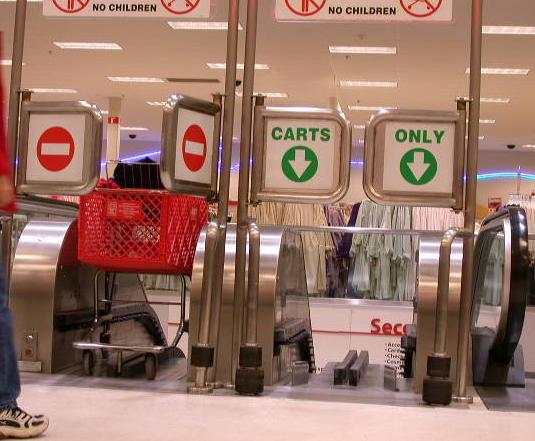
A shopping cart conveyor in Target at Pheasant Lane Mall in Nashua, New Hampshire

A shopping cart conveyor; also known as Vermaport, Cartveyor or shopping cart escalator; is a device used in multi-level retail stores for moving shopping carts parallel and adjacent to an escalator. Shoppers can load their shopping carts onto the conveyor, step onto the escalator, ride the escalator with the cart beside them and collect the cart with the contained merchandise at the next level.

While inclined moving walkways can be used in multi-level retail stores to transport shopping carts between floors, they are associated with safety hazards (such as, with baby strollers) and take up about twice as much floor space as a separate cart conveyor system, because moving walkways cannot be installed at inclinations greater than 12 degrees, while a cart conveyor can operate at an inclination of up to 35 degrees.

Only specially designed shopping carts can be transported with a cart conveyor.

== Principle of operation ==
A video of a shopping cart conveyor being used

When the user wishes to operate the device, they push the shopping cart through the device's safety doors. Guides in the floor then direct the shopping cart's wheels into the proper position. The device then senses the presence of the cart and transports it to the next store level. Devices generally feature some sort of a system, such as one-way hinges or a sensor, to stop people from entering the device.

The shopping cart conveyor operates at no greater speed than its adjacent escalator for people. This allows customers time to load their carts onto the device, ride the escalator and retrieve the cart at the next level.

The device can only be operated with compatible shopping carts. During the transport, the shopping cart remains level to stop the merchandise from falling off the cart.

== Regulation ==
Shopping cart conveyors are regulated under the ASME B20.1 Safety Standard for Conveyors and Related Equipment in the United States and under the Machinery Directive in the European Union.

== Manufacturers ==
According to Valuates Reports, the key global manufacturers of shopping cart conveyors as of 2023 include PFlow Industries, Zhejiang Aoma Elevator, Koyo Elevator, TRUMPF Elevator, Galaxy Fuji Elevator, Morris Vermaport Limited, and Fujitsu Elevator.

== See also ==
- Elevator
- Moving walkway
- Escalator
