= Escalator etiquette =

Moving staircase manners

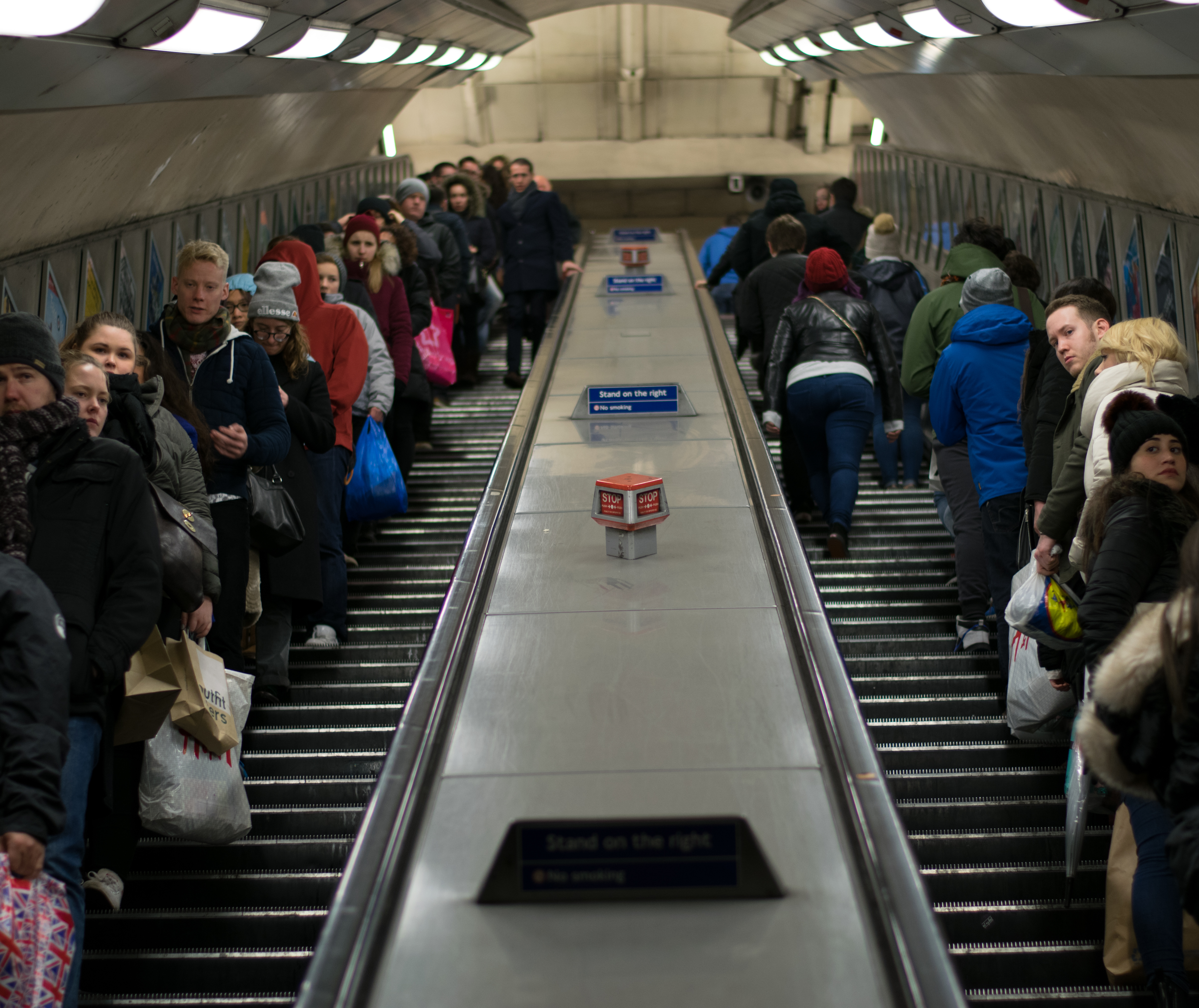
Standing on the right in the London Underground, while others walk on the left.

Escalator etiquette is the etiquette of using escalators and moving walkways. In many places, there is a convention that people should stand on a particular side to allow other people to walk on the other side. Standing on the right is the most common convention, following early escalator design in London. In the 21st century, there have been campaigns for standing on both sides for reasons of safety or to increase capacity.

== Standing conventions ==
The first escalators installed in the London Underground at Earl's Court station used the design patented by Charles Seeberger. These did not let the passengers dismount in the direction of travel, as currently. Instead, a diagonal partition shunted them off to one side while the stairs disappeared under the partition. The side chosen for disembarkation was the left hand side and this is the origin of their convention that riders should stand on the right, so that the walking riders would not have to cut into a standing line of people to exit.

A study of the London Underground published in 2013 found that 74.9% stood, while the remaining 25.1% walked.

Different regions follow different conventions: London, Hong Kong, and Osaka follow the stand-right/walk-left pattern, while in Japan (except the Kansai region), Malaysia, Singapore, Australia, and New Zealand, riders stand on the left and walk on the right.

== Efficiency studies and trials ==
A 2002 study of escalator capacity on the London Underground found that the proportion of passengers who walk decreases as escalator height increases, ranging from approximately 53-61% on the shortest escalators studied (7-8 meters) to 44% on the tallest (23 meters). The study’s linear trend lines intersect at a height of 18.43 meters, indicating that below this height, allowing walking on one side increases capacity, while for taller escalators, the effect is predicted to reverse.

In November-December 2015, Transport for London conducted a three-week trial at Holborn station to test whether encouraging passengers to stand on both sides of escalators could increase capacity during peak hours. The trial was conducted as part of a broader Escalator Passenger Safety Strategy testing safety initiatives across the London Underground network, where 40% of all customer injuries occur on escalators, and was listed under "Other Initiatives under development" rather than as a primary safety initiative. The trial required significant intervention, including personnel with megaphones and undercover staff physically blocking the walking side to enforce compliance.

During week 2 of the trial, when two escalators were designated standing-only while a third remained normal use, passengers began to migrate to the normal escalator in order to walk. In week 3, all three escalators were made standing-only. The trial reported a 30% increase in throughput when comparing one escalator configured for normal use versus standing-only, though this occurred during a period when service disruptions and the reopening of a nearby station affected passenger volumes. Customer behavior reverted to normal immediately after staff enforcement ended, with 13 formal complaints received from approximately 130,000 affected passengers, though staff reported widespread verbal resistance and non-compliance.

Following the trial, Transport for London acknowledged that while it proved the theoretical concept of improving customer flows, it "was limited in establishing the original aims of the experiment", noting that customers "reverted to the behavioural norm" once staff enforcement was withdrawn and that the trial "did not prove we could influence customer behaviour sustainably without significant resources present".

A second trial was planned for March-August 2016 to test whether behavior change could be achieved through signage, floor markings, and electronic messaging without direct staff intervention. An observational period in April-May 2016, also at Holborn station, found that standing on both sides only increased capacity during the busiest periods (over 100 passengers per minute), with no significant difference at lower traffic levels. The maximum throughput observed was 141 passengers per minute on standing-only escalators compared to 115 passengers per minute on walk-left escalators during peak congestion.

In 2017, Transport for London stated it intended to compile a comprehensive report combining and analyzing both trials, though no publication date was provided. In 2025, Transport for London stated that it does not hold such a report.

A 2016 computer simulation by Capgemini consultants, based on observations at Green Park station, estimated that requiring all passengers to stand could reduce average journey time for the majority who stand while increasing it for those who prefer to walk. The simulation assumed that 40% of passengers would walk on 24-meter escalators. A commenter on the blog post noted that this figure was taken from a Guardian article that attributed it to a 2002 study, but questioned whether the percentage was based on contemporary observed data or older survey responses.

In September 2015, a London Assembly member asked the Mayor about implementing London Health Commission recommendations to change escalator signage to encourage walking rather than standing. In response to this Mayor's Question, a 2016 safety report described potential plans for a trial to encourage more passengers to walk on escalators, which was expected to increase walking by 2-9%. Health Action Plan documents published in 2015 and 2016 focused on promoting walking and cycling between transport stops but made no mention of escalator or stair usage.

Transport for London concluded that standing-only escalators would only be beneficial at stations with very tall escalators (over 18.5 meters) experiencing peak congestion, and that implementing such a policy would require continuous enforcement that was not operationally sustainable. No permanent standing-only policy was implemented at Holborn station following the trials.

== Safety campaigns ==
Several transit systems have attempted to discourage walking on escalators for safety reasons.

In Japan, where different cities have different conventions, there was a "No Walk" campaign in 2015 that suggested remaining stationary on both sides and leaving an empty step between riders.

According to Hong Kong's MTR, 43% of accidents in a period in 2014 could be attributed to "people falling because they move, or walk along the escalator". Standing-only policies implemented in 2015 were associated with a ~12% reduction in escalator accidents to the same period in 2014, with ~51% of incidents involving seniors and children.

Other locations that have attempted to discourage walking on escalators include Toronto and Washington, D.C., but these campaigns have generally been unsuccessful. In 2024, the Taipei Metro added announcements encouraging passengers to stand on both sides.

== Gallery ==
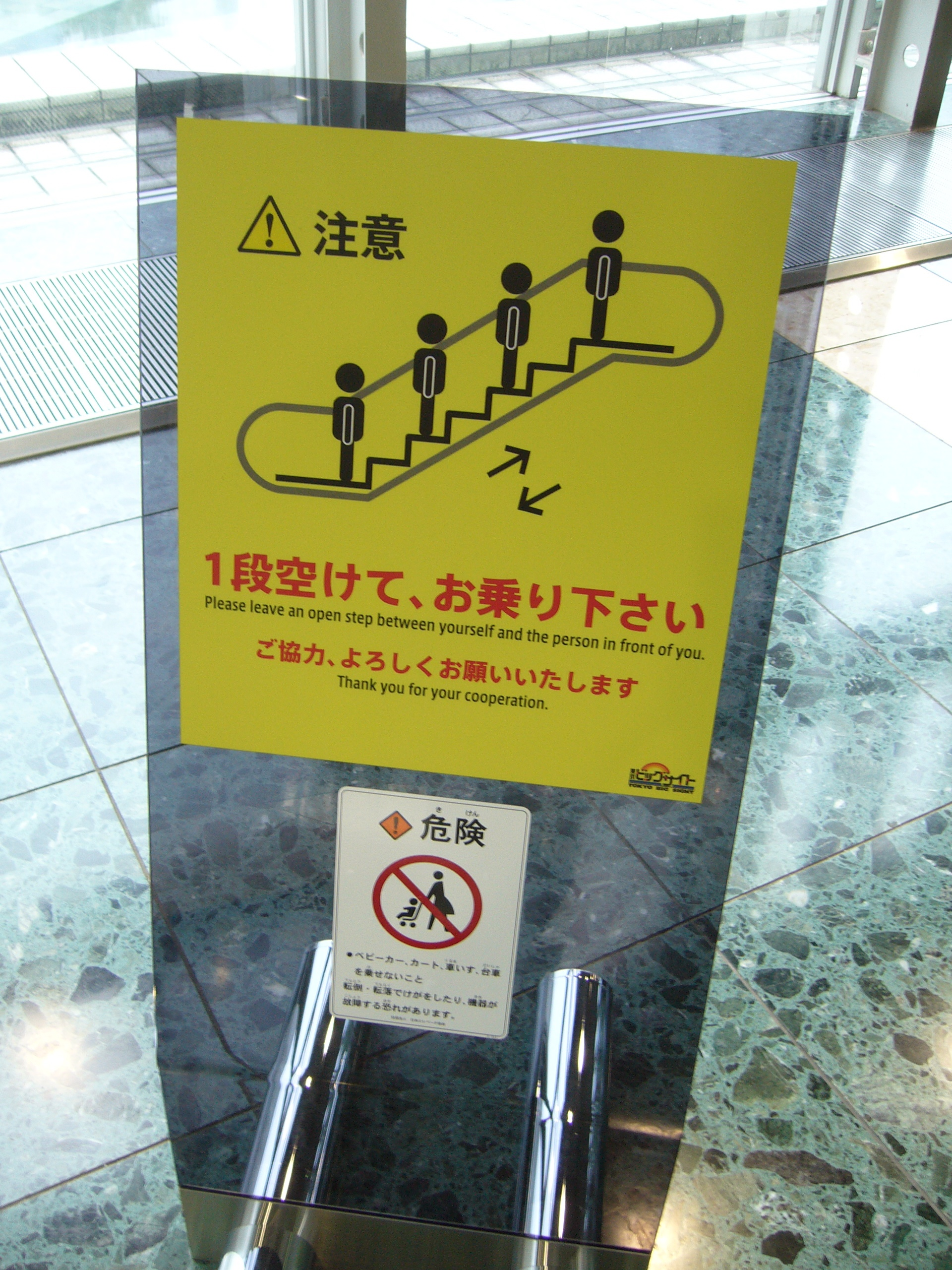
Leave an open step

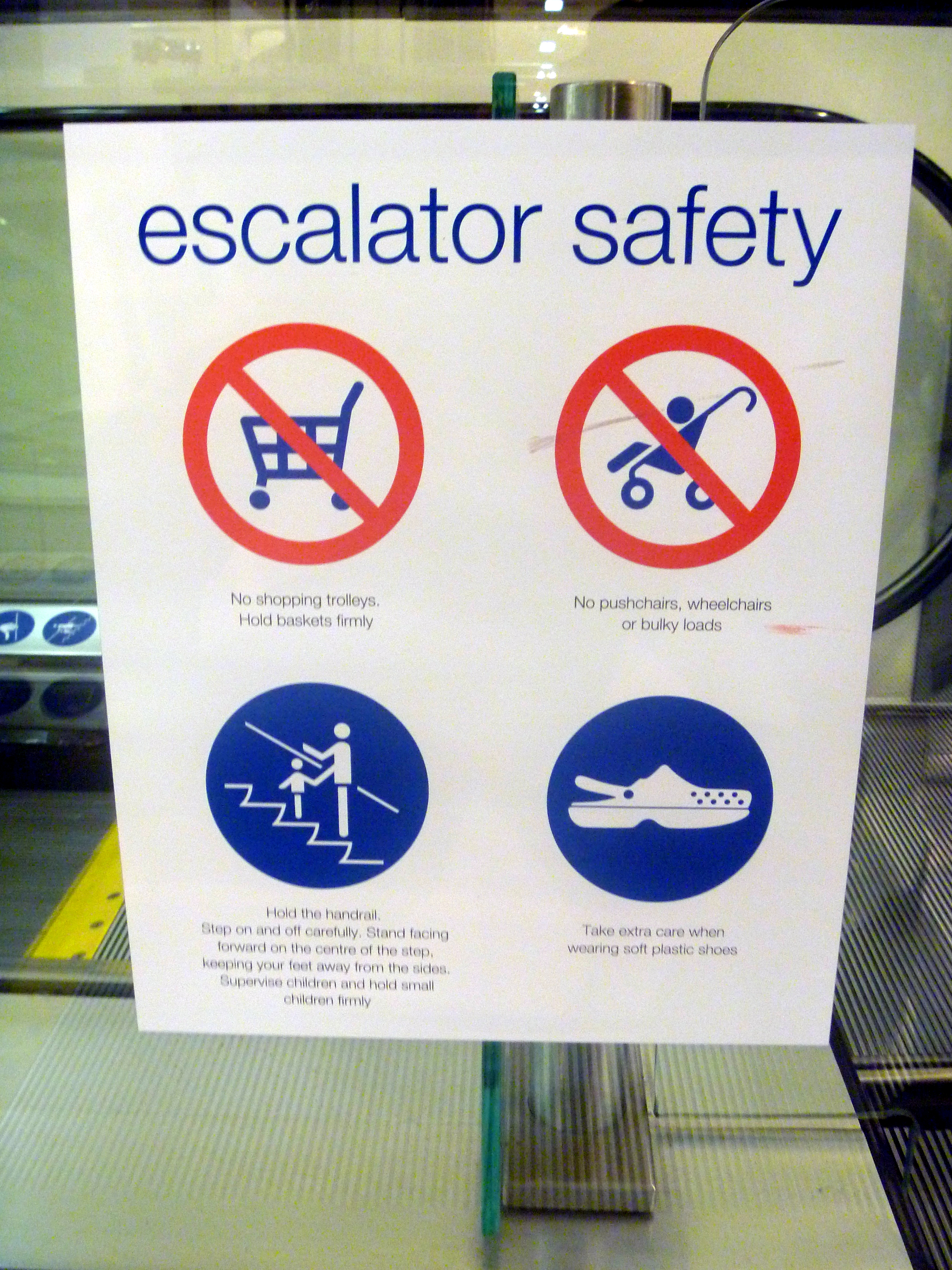
Crocs in Finsbury

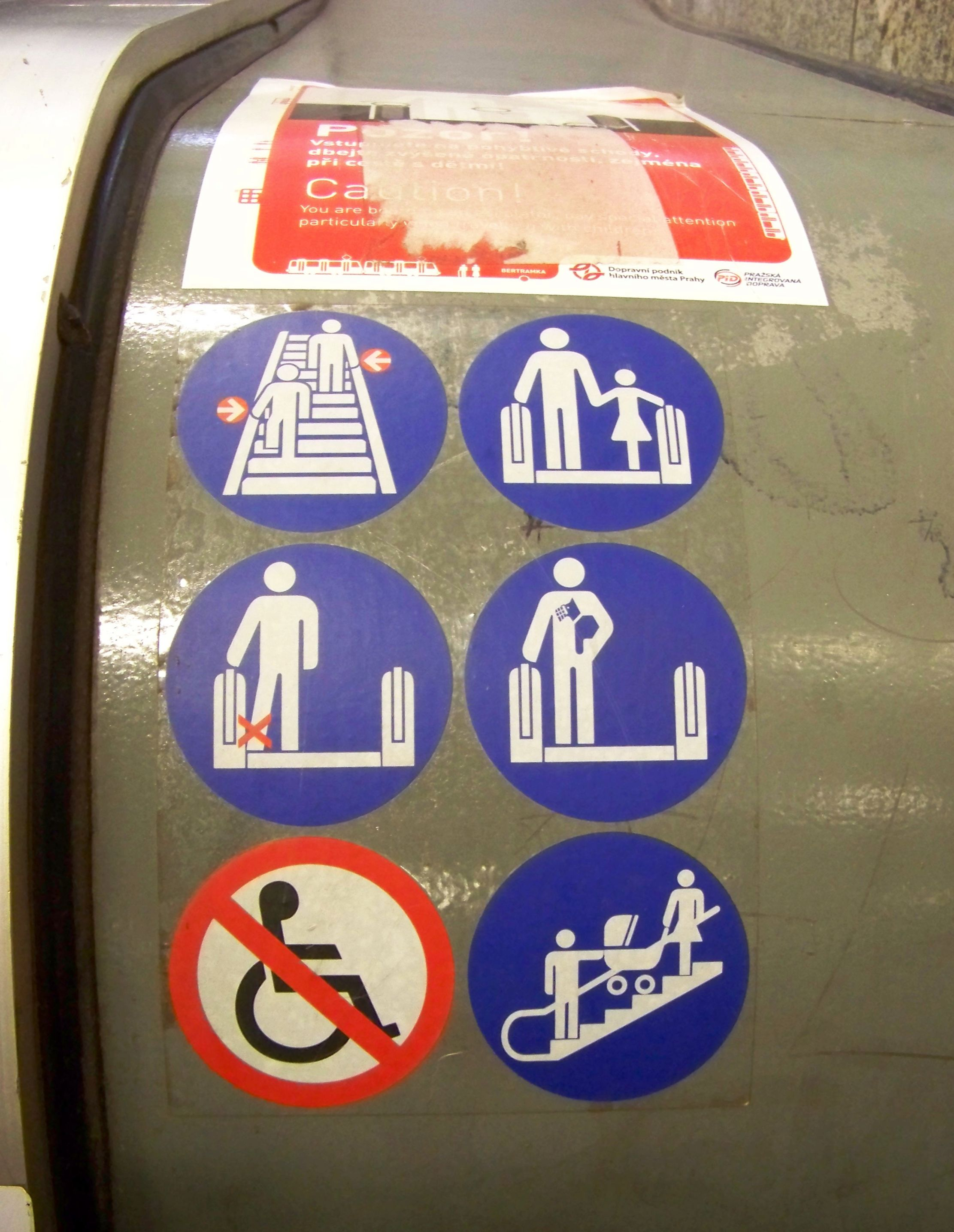
Palmovka station in Prague

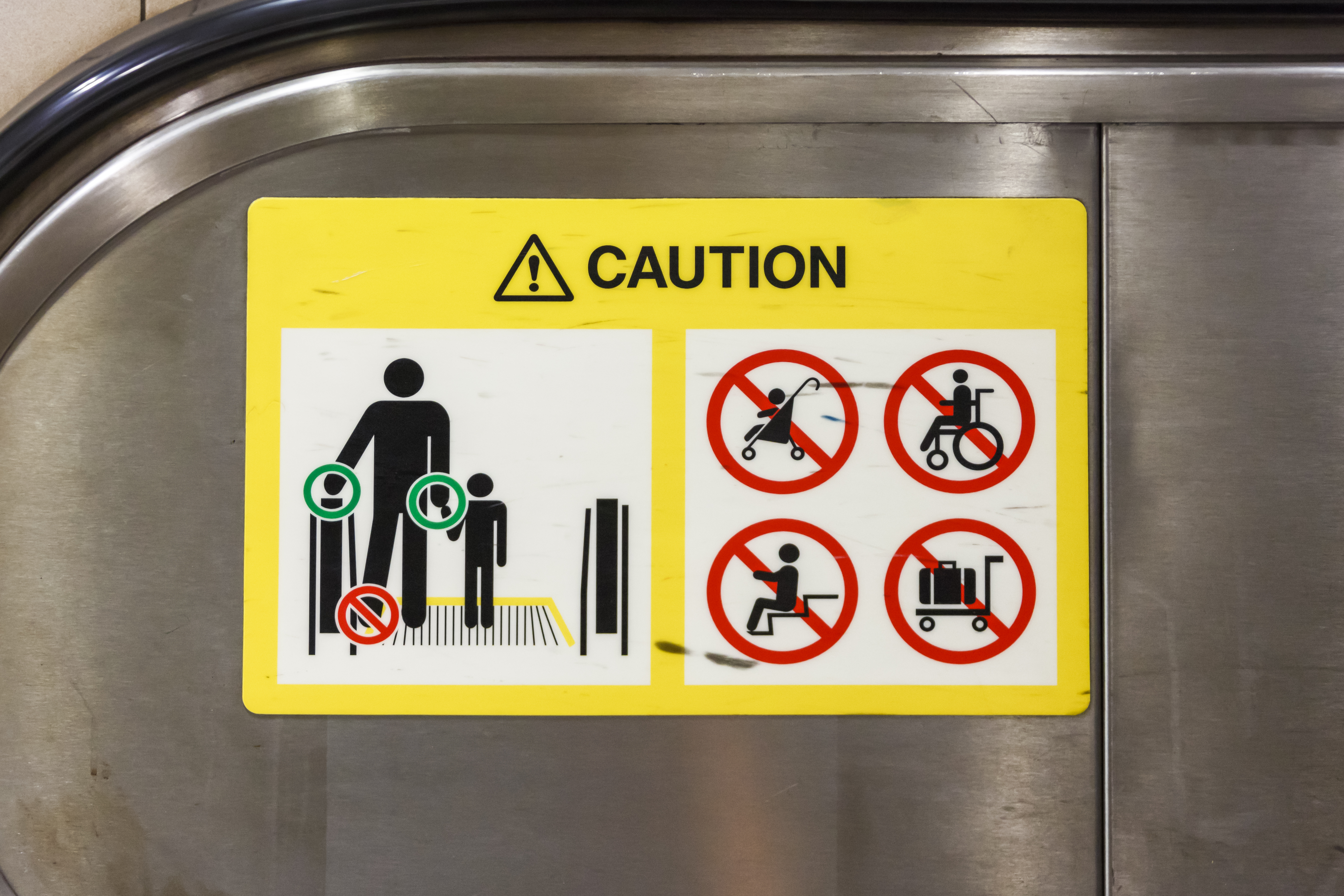
Singapore

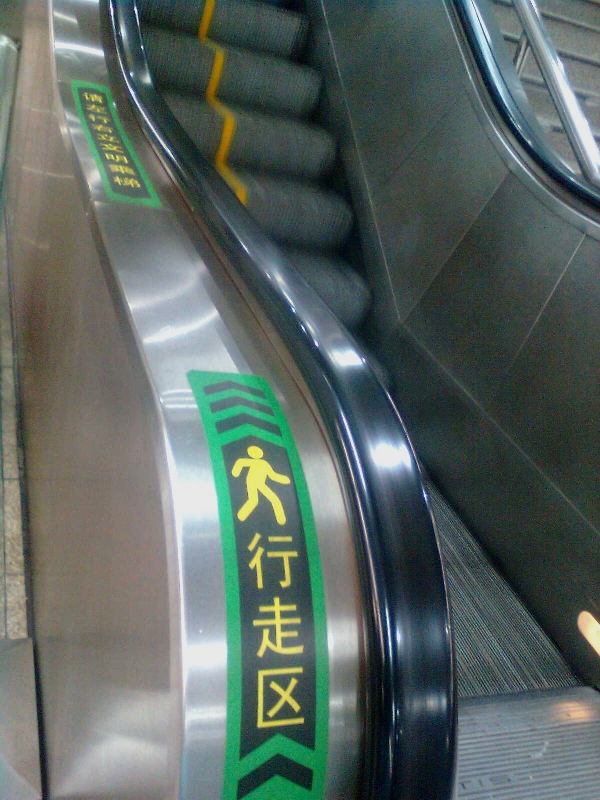
Walk left, stand right in China

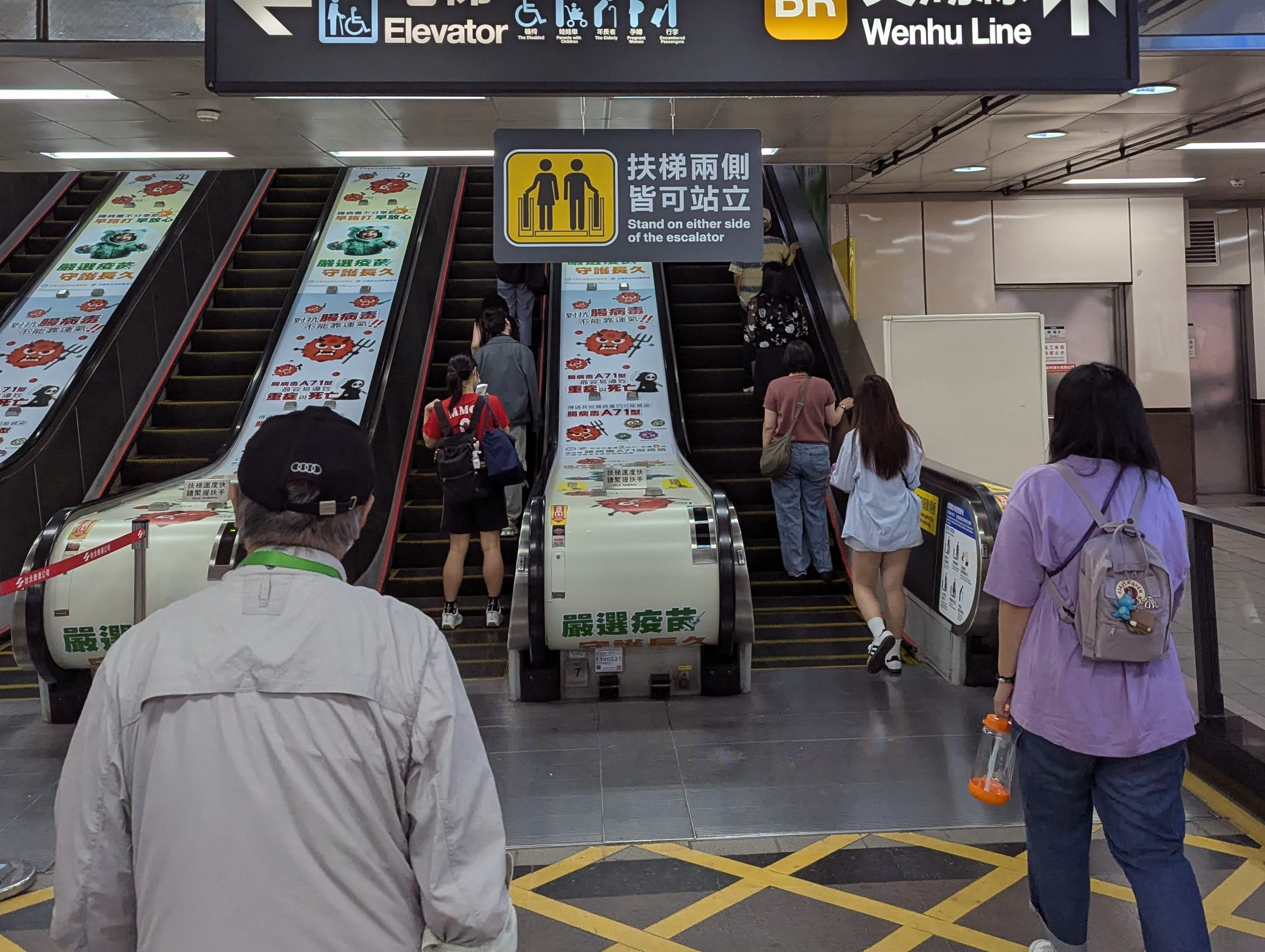
Passengers standing on the right side in Taiwan, despite the "Stand on either side" sign

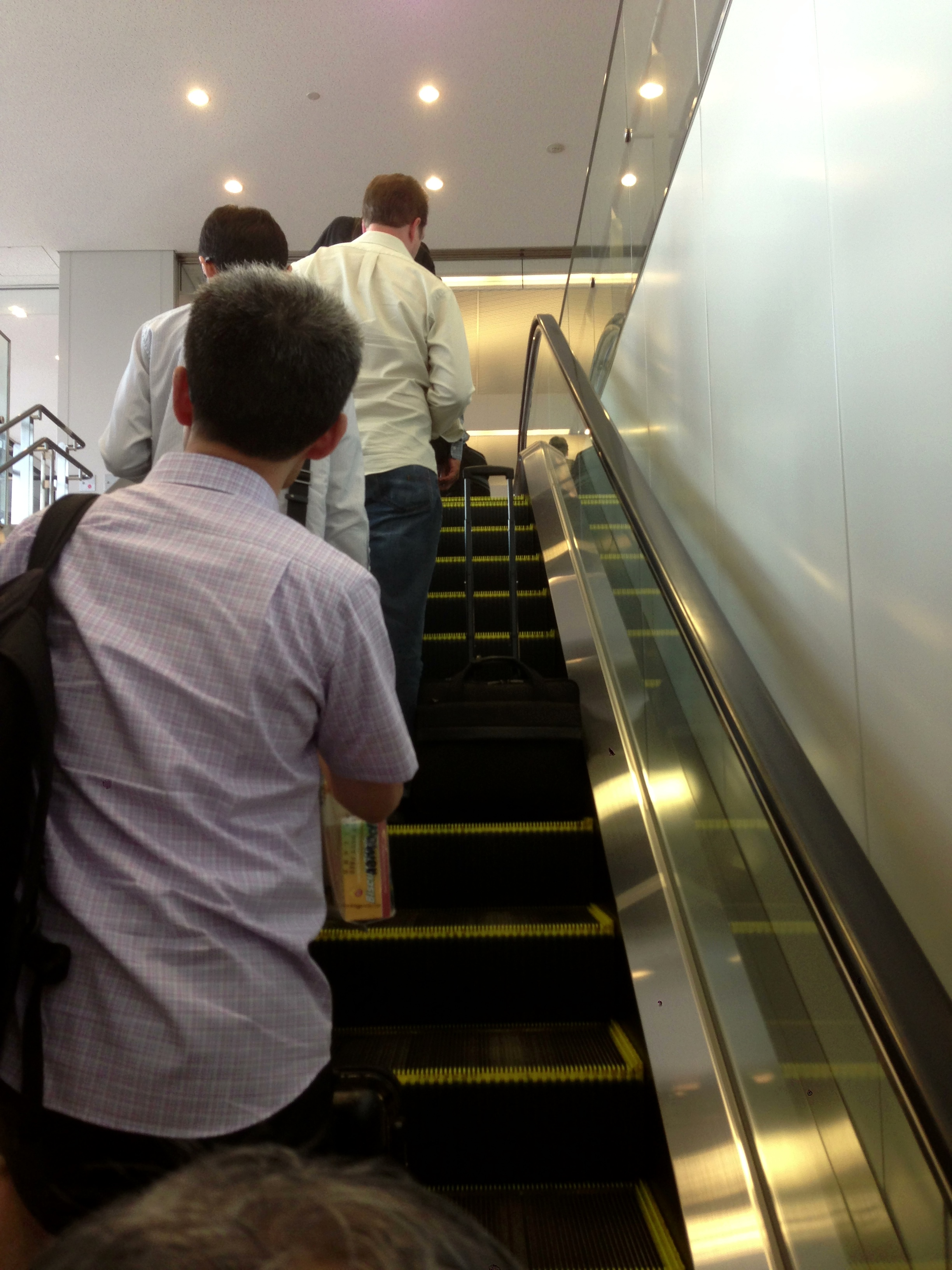
Standing on the left in Japan, where conventions vary between cities.

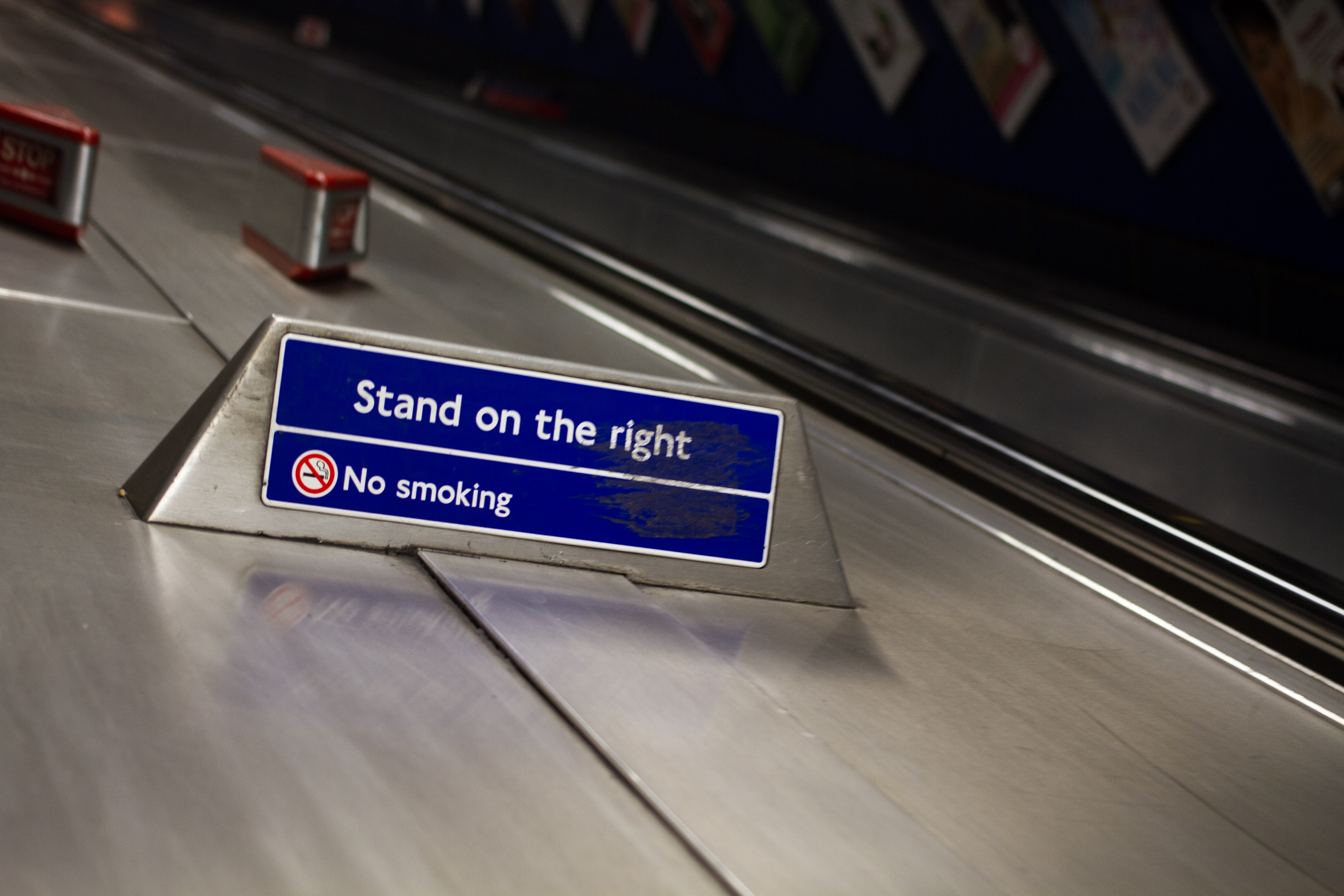
Signage on the London Underground instructing people to stand on the right.

== See also ==
- Left- and right-hand traffic
