= Nightfalls =

2022 single by Keith Urban

Single by Keith Urban
- Released: 31 March 2022
- Genre: Country pop
- Length: 3:40
- Label: Hit Red; Capitol Nashville; EMI Music Australia
- Songwriters: Keith Urban; Greg Kurstin; Maureen McDonald
- Producer: Greg Kurstin

Keith Urban singles chronology
"Wild Hearts" (2021)	"Nightfalls" (2022)	"Brown Eyes Baby" (2022)

Lyric Video
- "Nightfalls" on YouTube

"Nightfalls" is a song co-written and recorded by Australian and American country artist Keith Urban, released as a single on 31 March 2022. Urban wrote the song with Greg Kurstin and Mozella, while Kurstin produced the track. The song was released as a single to radio formats in Australia, Canada, New Zealand, Sweden, and the United Kingdom.

== Background ==
Urban previewed "Nightfalls" by posting two videos on social media prior to its release, saying "two summers have gone by without touring and the desire to have that feeling again inspired every part of creating this song". He described the process of writing the song with Greg Kurstin and Mozella as "pure joy," saying he wanted to "try and bring something to help us exhale and be in the moment – if only for 3 mins and 41 seconds". The song was premiered on BBC Radio 2 in the United Kingdom on 31 March 2022. It was released while Urban's single "Wild Hearts" continued to be promoted at country radio in the United States.

== Critical reception ==
Sterling Whitaker of Taste of Country described "Nightfalls" as a "very progressive pop-country track that's perfect for summer". Caleigh DeCaprio of Country Swag reviewed the song favourably, saying it would "have you up on your feet, wanting to be dancing the night away with your person and drunk on each other when the night falls". Tiffany Goldstein of CMT stated that while the song does not highlight Urban's guitar-playing ability, it showcases his "robust vocals", noting the use of the keyboard and drum beats, calling it a "radio-ready anthem" that is "perfect" for his then-upcoming "The Speed of Now World Tour".

== Credits and personnel ==
Adapted from AllMusic.

- Ethan Barrette – engineer
- Julian Burg – engineer
- Serban Ghenea – mixing
- John Hanes – engineer
- Scott Johnson – production coordination
- David Kalmusky – recording
- Greg Kurstin – bass guitar, composition, drums, engineer, electric guitar, keyboards, production, synthesizer
- Maureen McDonald – composition, backing vocals
- Randy Merrill – mastering engineer
- Alberto Sewald – assistant engineer
- Matt Tuggle – engineer
- Keith Urban – composition, acoustic guitar, electric guitar, lead vocals, backing vocals

== Charts ==
Chart performance for "Nightfalls"
Chart (2022)	Peak position
Australia Country Hot 50 (TMN)	3
Canada Country (Billboard)	25
Canada Digital Songs (Billboard)	44
