= Beyond the Fall of Night =

1990 novel by Gregory Benford

- Cover of the first edition
- Author: Gregory Benford and Arthur C. Clarke
- Cover artist: Judith Kazdym Leeds
- Language: English
- Genre: Science fiction
- Publisher: Putnam
- Publication date: July 17, 1990
- Publication place: United Kingdom
- Media type: Print (Hardcover)
- Pages: 298 pp
- ISBN: 0-399-13499-9
- OCLC: 20354488
- Dewey Decimal: 823/.914 20
- LC Class: PR6005.L36 B45 1990
- Preceded by: The City and the Stars

Beyond the Fall of Night (1990) is a novel by Arthur C. Clarke and Gregory Benford. The first part of Beyond the Fall of Night is a reprint of Clarke's Against the Fall of Night while the second half is a "sequel" by Gregory Benford that takes place many years later. This book is unrelated to The City and the Stars which is an expanded version of Against the Fall of Night which Clarke wrote himself three years after the publication of Against the Fall of Night.

== Critical response ==
James Nicoll described Beyond the Fall of Night as "an atrocity" and "an abomination", saying that it is "not just a bad book, the events in it can not happen given the events in [Against]", and that the only thing it had in common with Against was "some character names".

== Expanded version ==
The 1990 novella "Beyond the Fall of Night" was later expanded into the novel Beyond Infinity, with additional material and a change in the name and sex of the character.
