= Nightfall (video game) =

1999 video game

- Developer: Altor Systems
- Publisher: Altor Systems
- Platform: Mac OS 7,8,9 - PowerPC
- Release: 1999
- Genre: Adventure
- Mode: Single-player

Nightfall is an American computer game released in 1999 by Altor Systems, Inc. Although claimed to be the first real-time 3D first person adventure game, there are earlier examples of 3D first person adventure games, however, such as Total Eclipse, released in 1988. It employs a three dimensional world and sprites for objects such as vases and rats, as well as true 3D objects such as blocks and statues. Essentially, the gameplay is a combination of 3D first-person shooters such as Doom, the gameplay found in Myst, with some additional elements.

== Gameplay ==
The gameplay hand based interface is detailed in a Game Developers Conference paper that compares Unreal, Quake, Trespasser, Tomb Raider, Myst, and Nightfall styles of interaction. Gameplay is also described in the reviews listed in the Reception section.

Players can move and turn using arrow keys, but can also point and click via the mouse pointer (symbolized as a hand icon) to move or turn. In addition, the hand provides a means to grab 3D or sprite objects in the view, move them closer or further away, re-arranging objects on top or underneath each other, and drag/dropping them onto a user satchel icon. The objects act according to game physics – i.e. dragging an object next to another pushes the other object along if it's lightweight, or restricts the ability to move the grasped object if the other impacted object is heavy. In a novel interface behavior, if the grasped object is immobile, the user location is moved – a bit like grasping a protrusion and climbing or swinging from it.

The game can be completed by solving the puzzles, or in some cases utilizing alternative means to bypass puzzles such as climbing, throwing objects to trigger remote locations, or finding alternative routes to the objective. This solves a problem with Myst's gameplay – that some puzzles cannot be solved, so gameplay cannot proceed as the player is "stuck". In the case of Myst, a workaround is that the player obtains the solution from elsewhere – e.g. friends, hint books or websites, breaking out of the game. While playing Nightfall, alternative solutions can be found within the game itself.

The user can alternate between a first person 3D view of the world, and a top down map based view of the world. The map dynamically refreshes to show the areas the user has visited or can see, much as games like Marathon do. In addition, the map coloring changes relative to the users altitude, so they can see if rooms are above or below them, or if they are falling or rising.

A plot-line is also revealed through notes located through the levels. This reveals the experiences of another person who traversed the complex at some earlier date. The fourteenth levels also has notes revealing a hidden purpose to the complex.

== Plot ==
The player takes the role of an archaeologist exploring an ancient Egyptian tomb for a wonderful secret. Unfortunately, an earthquake occurs, sealing the entrance with rubble. Rather than waiting to be rescued, the archaeologist decides to explore the tomb for another exit and the treasure he was searching for.

The game is patterned after the journey of Ra through the underworld in Egyptian myth. After the game's first level, which serves as an entrance to the underworld, there are twelve levels corresponding to the twelve hours of Ra's journey. Many of the game's puzzles are based on the actions of Ra in the underworld. From the thirteenth level it is possible to escape the tomb and thus win the game. However, there is also a fourteenth "secret" level, which can be accessed from the thirteenth, and which leads to an alternative ending.

== Development and technology ==
The game was developed by Altor Systems, a company founded in 1995. The engine was custom written for the game. The 3D Engine List site lists attributes of the engine, which contribute to the appearance and gameplay. These include "Volumetric real-time light model", "Dynamic depth cued colored fog and dust', 'Physics model for collision, gravity, and object stacking", and a 'VR hand to select and pick up objects during game play or editing'. The game had both hardware 3D and software rendering support.

Both the Altor Web Site and the 3D Engine List give details of the ability to customize the game. A game editor was shipped with the game, and code could be written via a "Plug-in DLL architecture with source code".

== Reception ==
Reception

Review scores
Publication	Score
Inside Mac Games	4.5/5
The Age	4/5

Mac Gamers Ledge gave it 5/5 and states that 'Nightfall has breathed new life into the adventure genre by truly allowing you to explore a vast and interesting new world. You are no longer confined to a few preset paths but can instead go where you choose to.'

Just Adventure gave the game a rating of B+, "a bit below a perfect score, just for what I felt was a redundancy on the design of the levels and some puzzles", with music, sound and puzzles receiving the highest praise. On a technical note, the reviewer states 'Nightfall was designed using a first-person engine, and it was designed from scratch, a feat involving writing two million lines of code, which should get an A even though we don't give scores for programming!'.

A MacObserver article gave it a 'Pretty Cool' rating, and it received a 'gold star' from Four Fat Chicks.

== Legacy ==
The game is only compatible with Apple computers which use the Mac OS running on PowerPC processors, and it was not ported to other operating systems.

While not directly related, other 3D adventures such as realMyst followed, and some of the gameplay mechanics were similar to those in Nightfall. A review of realMyst compared its freedom of motion to 'Altor Systems with their ahead-of-its-time game, Nightfall'.
