= Against the Fall of Night =

1948 novel by Arthur C. Clarke

- Dust-jacket of the first edition
- Author: Arthur C. Clarke
- Cover artist: Frank Kelly Freas
- Language: English
- Genre: Science fiction
- Publisher: Gnome Press
- Publication date: 1953
- Publication place: United Kingdom
- Media type: Print (Hardcover)
- Pages: 223
- Followed by: The City and the Stars

Against the Fall of Night is a science fiction novel by British writer Arthur C. Clarke. Originally appearing as a novella in the November 1948 issue of the magazine Startling Stories, it was revised and expanded in 1951 and published in book form in 1953 by Gnome Press. It was later expanded and revised again and published in 1956 as The City and the Stars. A later edition includes another of Clarke's early works and is titled The Lion of Comarre and Against the Fall of Night. In 1990, with Clarke's approval, Gregory Benford wrote a sequel titled Beyond the Fall of Night, which continues the story arc of the 1953 novel. It is generally printed with the original novel as a single volume.

The title is from the poem "Smooth Between Sea and Land" by A. E. Housman, published in More Poems. Clarke explains: "I was also to discover the lines of A. E. Housman that not only described the locale perfectly, but also gave me the title of my first novel: 'Here on the level sand, between the sea and land, what shall I build or write against the fall of night?'".

== Comparison with The City and the Stars ==
The City and the Stars is a complete rewrite of Against the Fall of Night, carrying over the main settings and characters from the earlier novel.

== Plot summary ==
Diaspar is the last human city, hundreds of millions of years old. Alvin, seventeen years old, is the first child to be born in 7,000 years and lives among ancient immortals with unchanging lives. The Earth he knows lies in ruin, a vast desert, after a cataclysmic war with the Invaders millions of years earlier confined mankind to the planet. He is fascinated by the world and its history, which his tutor Jeserac finds disturbing, the fear of doing anything that might trigger a return of the Invaders remains palpable. Bored, Alvin explores the empty sections of the city, and on one such trip, finds stairs leading to the desert outside. He begins to walk down them but is stopped by a large stone inscribed with the words "There is a better way. Give my greetings to the Keeper of the Records. - Alaine of Lyndar".

Alvin takes the message to Rorden, the current Keeper of the Records, who has access to "all the knowledge of Humanity" in the city's databases. Rorden finds a message from Alaine but it simply states there are three ways to leave. Three years later, Rorden tells Alvin that he has deciphered Alaine's message, and takes him to a park in the center of Diaspar. There lies a monument to Yarlan Zey, designer of the park, which Rorden realizes was built to conceal some sort of transport. Rorden triggers a hidden elevator that takes them to an underground train station. A large map on the floor shows Diaspar as a brightly lit dot among many dimmed destinations, but one other dot remains lit, "Lys".

After three days of preparation, Alvin steps into a waiting train car. Expecting an abandoned city, Alvin is shocked when he finds a thriving garden-like environment including a lake. He is taken to meet Seranis, leader of the local town of Airlee. She explains that Diaspar and Lys are two extremes of civilization, the ultimate end of those who preferred city or country. The inhabitants of Lys are different from his own people, living short but full lives and having telepathic abilities. Alvin is prevented from going home as the citizens do not want him to reveal Lys to the people of Diaspar. They contact Rorden and tell him that Alvin will stay five days to allow the council of Lys time to decide his fate.

Alvin befriends Theon, Seranis' son, who takes Alvin camping. That night they see a bright light that Theon realizes comes from the ancient fortress of Shalmirane. Even Alvin has heard of Shalmirane; it is where mankind made its last stand against the Invaders. They decide to continue their hike and visit the fortress. At Shalmirane they find an old man who tells them his story; he was a follower of the Master, who came from space during the recovery following the invasion, attracting followers with his powers and machines. When he was dying, the Master spoke of the "Great Ones" returning, and his last words suggest he had lived on a planet around the Seven Suns, a wheel of multi-colored stars. The old man is the last remaining follower, sending signals into space to attract the Great Ones. He also controls the Master's machines, three advanced intelligent robots, but the Master instructed them to keep secrets. Alvin convinces the man to lend him one of the robots so he can take it to Rorden, promising to return it.

The boys return to Lys, and Alvin is given the choice of staying in Lys forever or returning to Diaspar without his memories. Alvin agrees to the mind wipe but programs the robot to grab him and take him to the transit station before this occurs. He returns home, and Rorden takes Alvin and the robot under the city to meet the Master Robots, the computers that run the city. They are unable to remove the instructions from the Master, so they instead make a duplicate robot without the instructions in place. When they return to the surface, they find the Council has met in their absence and is trying to decide what to do about Alvin's visit to Lys. They decide to block the underground train system and instruct Rorden to remove all references to Lys from his records. As the Council debates, they allow Alvin to leave, expecting, and allowing, him to run for the train and return to Lys before it is blocked.

Rorden is surprised when he finds a message from Alvin instructing him to meet at the tower where he first found the message from Alaine. Alvin explains that the new robot had revealed that the Master had landed on Earth not at Lys, but at the Port of Diaspar. He retrieves the ship from beneath the sand and flies to Lys where he learns they have also blocked the train, and sows confusion by claiming he used it without problem. He causes further confusion by stating that Diaspar now knows all about Lys but will have nothing to do with their inferior culture. The next day he and Theon fly to Shalmirane to fulfill his promise to return the robot, but find the old man had died.

Alvin and Theon decide to visit the Seven Suns. They arrive at a planet around the middle star and find it as desolate as Earth. Despairing that his search for meaning has failed, they return to the ship and are met by a disembodied superintelligence with the behavior of a child but memories going back further than any human. The alien, Vanamonde, is convinced that Alvin is a member of the race of creators it has been waiting to return. They return to Earth to find Diaspar and Lys in constant communication over the events due to the fears their trip will trigger the Invaders to return. Rorden is a voice of calm, he has been researching the topic and can find no mention of the Invaders or any sort of treaty in the data banks.

Alvin flies Rorden and Jeserac to Lys so they can add to the effort to understand Vanamonde. Over a period of months, they learn that their history is false. Man had only reached Persephone when aliens arrived, minds so much greater than their own that they returned to Earth and spent millions of years improving. When they were ready to join the galactic empire, they worked on projects like the Seven Suns, an artwork marking the agreed-on center of the galaxy. It was mankind that suggested the next great galactic effort, the construction of a non-physical pure intellect. This produced the Mad Mind, destroying swaths of the galaxy before it is locked up in the Black Sun. Learning from their mistakes, Vanamonde is created.

Around the same time, the galactic empire contacts another race "far around the curve of the Cosmos" that has developed its own superintellect, one along purely physical lines. Most of the galaxy leaves on a quest to meet them, powering their great ship using the energy of all the suns, leaving the galaxy permanently dimmed. Only the Seven Suns remain untouched. Those that stayed behind were not adventurous and slowly went extinct over time, Earth only avoiding that fate by luck. Even the Battle of Shalmirane is a myth; Shalmirane was built to destroy the Moon when it threatened to crash into Earth.

The book ends with the Tomb of Yarlan Zey being torn down as the links between Lys and Diaspar are opened to all. Alvin sets himself to rebuilding the Earth's oceans and solving the mystery of who the Master was. He intends to send the spaceship off on its own to bring a message to their now distant ancestors, hoping Earth will be worthy of their companionship when they return in the far distant future.

== Politics ==
The book makes a distinction between the city life of Diaspar, and the life in Lys. Diaspar reflects the values of a city, in which technology cares for mundane tasks (robots, streets, food), so people can pursue pleasures such as music and knowledge. The opposite is true in Lys, which has a rural style where everything comes from nature. When Alvin re-introduced the two, they found that one still needed the other, and that their cultures had become stifled. The Council from Diaspar had become old and weary, and did not want to deal with the exuberance of youth, while Lys, feeling that it was young, did not want the city culture to interfere with its natural way of life. When the two cultures met, they found out that they complemented each other: Diaspar with infinite life and technology, and Lys with quick minds and telepathy.

== Reception ==
Groff Conklin described the original edition of the novel as "a light, simple, fast-moving and often richly imaginative fantasy." Boucher and McComas praised "this brief but intense book" as "beautiful", describing it as "poetry and awe and wonder" and characterizing Clarke as "the visionary poet of a future so far distant that its most prosaic science passes our technical understanding." P. Schuyler Miller reported that because the narrative "is so well told, the story becomes convincing, and its magic spreads over the reader as well as the people of the plot." In 1969, Alexei Panshin wrote that "the story is largely undeveloped -- too much is asserted, too little is examined."

== Notes ==
The work opens with a story fragment, apparently written in isolation in 1935, in which all Diaspar has fallen silent and Alvin is called outside by his father to see something in the sky. It is a cloud. This scene dramatises the "desert at the end of time" setting.

== Sources ==
- Chalker, Jack L.; Mark Owings (1998). The Science-Fantasy Publishers: A Bibliographic History, 1923-1998. Westminster, MD and Baltimore: Mirage Press, Ltd. p. 302.
- Tuck, Donald H. (1974). The Encyclopedia of Science Fiction and Fantasy. Chicago: Advent. p. 101. ISBN 0-911682-20-1.
