= List of Keith Urban concert tours =

The following is a comprehensive list of New Zealand-born Australian country music recording artist Keith Urban's concert tours. Urban has embarked on thirteen headlining concerts tours, and one co-headlining concerts tours since 2004. His first tour was the Livin' Right Now Tour. The Speed of Now World Tour was his thirteenth and most recent headlining tour.

== CMT on Tour: Keith Urban Be Here '04 (2004) ==
CMT on Tour: Keith Urban Be Here '04
- Tour by Keith Urban
- Location: United States
- Associated album: Be Here
- Start date: 8 October 2004
- End date: 13 November 2004
- Legs: 1
- No. of shows: 21

Keith Urban concert chronology
- CMT on Tour: Keith Urban Be Here '04 (2004); Livin' Right Now Tour (2004)

The CMT on Tour: Keith Urban Be Here '04 was Urban's first headlining concert tour and was in support of his fourth studio album Be Here (2004). It began on 8 October 2004 in Muncie, Indiana and finished on 13 November 2004 in Cleveland, Ohio.

=== Opening act ===
- Katrina Elam (First 10 dates)
- Shelly Fairchild (Last 10 dates)

=== Tour dates ===
Date	City	Country	Venue
North America
8 October 2004	Muncie	United States	Emens Auditorium
9 October 2004	Peoria	United States	Peoria Civic Center
10 October 2004	Cincinnati	United States	U.S. Bank Arena
14 October 2004	Houston	United States	Jones Hall
15 October 2004	Austin	United States	Stubb's
16 October 2004	Grand Prairie	United States	Nokia Live
20 October 2004	Birmingham	United States	BJCC Concert Hall
22 October 2004	Savannah	United States	Savannah Civic Center
23 October 2004	Atlanta	United States	Fox Theatre
25 October 2004	Lowell	United States	Tsongas Center
26 October 2004	Fairfax	United States	Patriot Center
27 October 2004	New York City	United States	Beacon Theatre
29 October 2004	Pittsburgh	United States	Palumbo Center
30 October 2004	Atlantic City	United States	Etess Arena
3 November 2004	Champaign	United States	Assembly Hall
4 November 2004	Milwaukee	United States	Milwaukee Theatre
5 November 2004	Detroit	United States	State Theatre
6 November 2004	Columbus	United States	Nationwide Arena
11 November 2004	La Crosse	United States	La Crosse Center
12 November 2004	Saginaw	United States	Wendler Arena
13 November 2004	Cleveland	United States	State Theatre

== Livin' Right Now Tour (2004) ==
The Livin' Right Now Tour was Urban's second headlining concert tour. It was in support of his fourth studio album Be Here (2004).

== Alive in '05 (2005) ==
The Alive in '05 was Urban's second headlining concert tour. It was in support of his fourth studio album Be Here (2004).

== Still Alive in '06 (2006) ==
The Still Alive in '06 was Urban's third headlining concert tour.

== Love, Pain & the Whole Crazy World Tour (2007) ==
The Love, Pain & the Whole Crazy World was Urban's four headlining concert tour. It was in support of his fifth studio album Love, Pain & the Whole Crazy Thing (2006).

== A.C.M Presents: Keith Urban & Rory Gilliatte '6 String Bandits' Tour (2008) ==
The A.C.M Presents Keith Urban & Rory Gilliatte '6 String Bandits' Tour

== Love, Pain & the Whole Crazy Carnival Ride Tour (2007) ==
The Love, Pain & the Whole Crazy Carnival Ride Tour was co-headlining concert tour by Urban American country music singer Carrie Underwood! It was in support of his fifth studio album Love, Pain & the Whole Crazy Thing (2006) and her second studio album Carnival Ride.

== Escape Together Tour (2009) ==
The Escape Together was Urban's fifth headlining concert tour.

== Summer Lovin' 2010 Tour (2010) ==
The Summer Lovin' 2010 Tour was Urban's sixth headlining concert tour.

== Get Closer 2011 World Tour (2011) ==
The Get Closer 2011 World Tour was Urban's seventh headlining concert tour. It was in support of his seventh studio album Get Closer (2011). The tour began on 8 April 2011 in Adelaide, South Australia and finished on 15 October 2011 in Minneapolis, Minnesota.

== Light the Fuse Tour (2013–14) ==
The Light the Fuse Tour was Urban's eighth headlining concert tour. It was in support of his eighth studio album Fuse (2013). The tour began on 18 July 2013 in Cincinnati, Ohio and finished on 29 June 2014 in Perth, Western Australia.

== Raise 'Em Up Tour (2014) ==
The Raise 'Em Up Tour was Urban's ninth headlining concert tour. It was in support of his eighth studio album Fuse (2013). It began on 12 July 2014 in. Alberta and completed on 7 September 2014 in Wheatland, California. This was the second tour to promote Fuse.

== ripCORD World Tour (2016) ==
The ripCORD World Tour was Urban's tenth headlining concert tour. It was in support of his ninth studio album Ripcord (2016). It began on 2 June 2016 in Bonner Springs and completed on 17 December 2016 in Brisbane, Queensland. The Oceania leg of the tour was co-headlined with Carrie Underwood.

== Graffiti U World Tour (2018–19) ==
GraffitiU World Tour
- World tour by Keith Urban
- Location: Worldwide
- Associated album: Graffiti U
- Start date: 15 June 2018
- End date: 6 February 2019
- Legs: 2
- No. of shows: 63 in North America; 9 in Australia; 6 in Europe; 78 total

Keith Urban concert chronology
- ripCORD World Tour (2016); Graffiti U World Tour (2018–19); The Speed of Now World Tour (2022)

The Graffiti U World Tour was Urban's eleventh headlining concert tour and was in support of his ninth studio album Ripcord (2016). It began on 15 June 2018 in Maryland Heights, Missouri and finished on 10 March 2019 in Dublin, Ireland.

=== Opening acts ===
North America

- Kelsea Ballerini
- Lindsay Ell
- Julia Michaels

Europe

- Cam
- Brett Eldredge
- Chase Rice
- Drake White
- Kerri Watt

=== Setlist ===
The following setlist comes from the opening night in Maryland Heights, Missouri on 15 June 2018. The covers were not performed in Noblesville, Indiana.

1. "Meet Me in St. Louis, Louis" (Judy Garland cover. Recording of Garland was played during the chorus)
2. "Never Comin Down"
3. "Coming Home"
4. "Somewhere in My Car"
5. "Days Go By"
6. "Parallel Line"
7. "Long Hot Summer"
8. "My Wave" with (Shy Carter)
9. "You Gonna Fly"
10. "Somebody Like You"
11. "Texas Time"
12. "Where the Blacktop Ends"
13. "Blue Ain't Your Color"
1. "Drop Top"
2. "Cop Car"
3. "Slow Hands" (Niall Horan cover)
4. "Lights Down Los" (MAX cover)
5. "The Fighter"
6. Medley: "Who Wouldn't Wanna Be Me"/"Kiss a Girl"/"You Look Good in My Shirt"
7. "Gone Tomorrow (Here Today)"
8. "Little Bit of Everything"
9. "John Cougar, John Deere, John 3:16"
10. "Wasted Time"

Encore

24. "But for the Grace of God"
25. "Horses"

=== Tour dates ===
Date	City	Country	Venue	Opening acts
North America
15 June 2018	Maryland Heights	United States	Hollywood Casino Amphitheatre	Kelsea Ballerini
16 June 2018	Noblesville	United States	Ruoff Home Mortgage Music Center	Kelsea Ballerini
22 June 2018	Clarkston	United States	DTE Energy Music Theatre	Kelsea Ballerini
23 June 2018	Burgettstown	United States	KeyBank Pavilion	Kelsea Ballerini
27 June 2018	Saratoga Springs	United States	Saratoga Performing Arts Center	Kelsea Ballerini
29 June 2018	Toronto	Canada	Budweiser Stage	Kelsea Ballerini
30 June 2018	Toronto	Canada	Budweiser Stage	Kelsea Ballerini
5 July 2018	Gilford	United States	Bank of New Hampshire Pavilion	Kelsea Ballerini
6 July 2018	Gilford	United States	Bank of New Hampshire Pavilion	Kelsea Ballerini
8 July 2018	Hopewell	United States	CMAC	Kelsea Ballerini
13 July 2018	West Valley City	United States	USANA Amphitheatre	Kelsea Ballerini
14 July 2018	Greenwood Village	United States	Fiddler's Green Amphitheatre	Kelsea Ballerini
15 July 2018	Albuquerque	United States	Isleta Amphitheater	Kelsea Ballerini
20 July 2018	Mountain View	United States	Shoreline Amphitheatre	Kelsea Ballerini
21 July 2018	Lake Tahoe	United States	Lake Tahoe Outdoor Arena	Kelsea Ballerini
22 July 2018	Lake Tahoe	United States	Lake Tahoe Outdoor Arena	Kelsea Ballerini
27 July 2018	Raleigh	United States	Coastal Credit Union Music Park	Kelsea Ballerini
28 July 2018	Charlotte	United States	PNC Music Pavilion	Kelsea Ballerini
29 July 2018	Alpharetta	United States	Verizon Wireless Amphitheatre at Encore Park	Kelsea Ballerini
3 August 2018	Camden	United States	BB&T Pavilion	Kelsea Ballerini
4 August 2018	Mansfield	United States	Xfinity Center	Kelsea Ballerini
5 August 2018	Bangor	United States	Darling's Waterfront Pavilion	Kelsea Ballerini
10 August 2018	Cuyahoga Falls	United States	Blossom Music Center	Kelsea Ballerini
11 August 2018	Bristow	United States	Jiffy Lube Live	Kelsea Ballerini
12 August 2018	Virginia Beach	United States	Veterans United Home Loans Amphitheater	Kelsea Ballerini
15 August 2018	Rogers	United States	Walmart Arkansas Music Pavilion	Lindsay Ell
17 August 2018	Kansas City	United States	Sprint Center	Kelsea Ballerini
18 August 2018	Tinley Park	United States	Hollywood Casino Amphitheatre	Kelsea Ballerini
19 August 2018	Cincinnati	United States	Riverbend Music Center	Kelsea Ballerini
24 August 2018	Nashville	United States	Bridgestone Arena	Kelsea Ballerini
25 August 2018	Orange Beach	United States	Amphitheater at the Wharf	Kelsea Ballerini
26 August 2018	Tuscaloosa	United States	Tuscaloosa Amphitheater	Kelsea Ballerini
7 September 2018	Uncasville	United States	Mohegan Sun Arena	Kelsea Ballerini
8 September 2018	Uncasville	United States	Mohegan Sun Arena	Kelsea Ballerini
12 September 2018	Moncton	Canada	Avenir Centre	Lindsay Ell
14 September 2018	Ottawa	Canada	Canadian Tire Centre	Lindsay Ell
15 September 2018	London	Canada	Budweiser Gardens	Lindsay Ell
19 September 2018	Winnipeg	Canada	MTS Centre	Lindsay Ell
21 September 2018	Saskatoon	Canada	SaskTel Centre	Lindsay Ell
22 September 2018	Edmonton	Canada	Rogers Place	Lindsay Ell
23 September 2018	Calgary	Canada	Scotiabank Saddledome	Lindsay Ell
25 September 2018	Vancouver	Canada	Rogers Arena	Lindsay Ell
27 September 2018	Eugene	United States	Matthew Knight Arena	Kelsea Ballerini
28 September 2018	Boise	United States	Taco Bell Arena	Kelsea Ballerini
29 September 2018	Missoula	United States	Adams Center	Kelsea Ballerini
4 October 2018	Phoenix	United States	Ak-Chin Pavilion	Kelsea Ballerini
5 October 2018	Laughlin	United States	Laughlin Event Center	Kelsea Ballerini
6 October 2018	Los Angeles	United States	Staples Center	Kelsea Ballerini
8 October 2018	Santa Barbara	United States	Santa Barbara Bowl	Lindsay Ell
12 October 2018	Peoria	United States	Peoria Civic Center	Kelsea Ballerini
13 October 2018	Minneapolis	United States	Target Center	Kelsea Ballerini
14 October 2018	Grand Forks	United States	Ralph Engelstad Arena	Kelsea Ballerini
18 October 2018	Toledo	United States	Huntington Center	Kelsea Ballerini
19 October 2018	Grand Rapids	United States	Van Andel Arena	Kelsea Ballerini
20 October 2018	Louisville	United States	KFC Yum! Center	Kelsea Ballerini
24 October 2018	Youngstown	United States	Covelli Centre	Kelsea Ballerini
25 October 2018	Hershey	United States	Giant Center	Kelsea Ballerini
27 October 2018	Brooklyn	United States	Barclays Center	Kelsea Ballerini
28 October 2018	Charlottesville	United States	John Paul Jones Arena	Kelsea Ballerini
1 November 2018	North Little Rock	United States	Verizon Arena	Kelsea Ballerini
2 November 2018	New Orleans	United States	Smoothie King Center	Kelsea Ballerini
3 November 2018	Dallas	United States	American Airlines Center	Kelsea Ballerini
Australia
23 January 2019	Newcastle	Australia	Newcastle Entertainment Centre	Julia Michaels
25 January 2019	Sydney	Australia	Qudos Bank Arena	Julia Michaels
26 January 2019	Sydney	Australia	Qudos Bank Arena	Julia Michaels
27 January 2019	Canberra	Australia	GIO Stadium	Julia Michaels
31 January 2019	Brisbane	Australia	Brisbane Entertainment Centre	Julia Michaels
1 February 2019	Brisbane	Australia	Brisbane Entertainment Centre	Julia Michaels
2 February 2019	Brisbane	Australia	Brisbane Entertainment Centre	Julia Michaels
5 February 2019	Melbourne	Australia	Rod Laver Arena	Julia Michaels
6 February 2019	Melbourne	Australia	Rod Laver Arena	Julia Michaels
Europe
3 March 2019^{[A]}	Berlin	Germany	Verti Music Hall	Cam; Drake White
4 March 2019^{[A]}	Amsterdam	Netherlands	AFAS Live	Brett Eldredge; Drake White
6 March 2019	London	England	Kentish Town Forum	Kerri Watt
8 March 2019^{[A]}	London	England	The O_{2} Arena	Chase Rice; Cam; Brett Eldredge
9 March 2019^{[A]}	Glasgow	Scotland	SSE Hydro	Chase Rice; Cam; Brett Eldredge
10 March 2019^{[A]}	Dublin	Ireland	3Arena	Chase Rice; Cam; Brett Eldredge

A. These shows were part of the C2C: Country to Country festival.

=== Box score ===
Date	Venue	City	Attendance	Revenue
5 July 2018	Bank of New Hampshire Pavilion	Gilford	15,056 / 16,052	$1,032,469
6 July 2018	Bank of New Hampshire Pavilion	Gilford	15,056 / 16,052	$1,032,469
29 July 2018	Verizon Wireless Amphitheatre	Alpharetta	11,379 / 12,531	$820,362
24 August 2018	Bridgestone Arena	Nashville	15,630 / 15,630	$959,181
25 August 2018	Amphitheater at the Wharf	Orange Beach	9,484 / 9,484	$515,313
26 August 2018	Tuscaloosa Amphitheater	Tuscaloosa	6,887 / 7,154	$385,309
7 September 2018	Mohegan Sun Arena	Uncasville	13,117 / 13,181	$1,304,865
8 September 2018	Mohegan Sun Arena	Uncasville	13,117 / 13,181	$1,304,865
22 September 2018	Rogers Place	Edmonton	12,022 / 12,022	$981,340
23 September 2018	Scotiabank Saddledome	Calgary	10,786 / 10,786	$879,709
5 October 2018	Laughlin Event Center	Laughlin	9,303 / 11,598	$850,570
6 October 2018	Staples Center	Los Angeles	10,264 / 13,331	$810,247
23 January 2019	Newcastle Entertainment Centre	Newcastle	5,290 / 5,370	$512,192
25 January 2019	Qudos Bank Arena	Sydney	23,398 / 24,000	$3,765,680
26 January 2019	Qudos Bank Arena	Sydney	23,398 / 24,000	$3,765,680
Total			53,754 / 60,268	$4,342,228

== The Speed of Now World Tour (2022) ==
The Speed of Now World Tour was Urban's sixth headlining concert tour.

== Keith Urban the Las Vegas Residency (2023) ==
Keith Urban the Las Vegas Residency was Urban's first Las Vegas residency at the Bakkt Theater (now PH Live).

== High in Vegas (2024–25) ==
High in Vegas is Urban's Las Vegas residency at the Fontainebleau Las Vegas. The first five shows were in October 2024, and the second five shows will be in November 2025.
