= The Story So Far (Keith Urban album) =

Greatest hits album by Keith Urban
- Released: 11 May 2012
- Genre: Country
- Length: 80:50
- Labels: Capitol Nashville; EMI Australia
- Producers: Keith Urban; Dann Huff

Keith Urban chronology
Get Closer (2010)	The Story So Far (2012)	Fuse (2013)

The Story So Far is a greatest hits album released by Keith Urban in Australia in May 2012.

== Background ==
In October 2011, Keith Urban was announced as being a judge on the Australian version of The Voice. The series commenced in April 2012 and, to coincide with this, an Australian and New Zealand only greatest hits compilation titled The Story So Far was released. It features 19 tracks from the Grammy Award and ARIA Award winning artist's albums Get Closer, Defying Gravity, Love, Pain & the Whole Crazy Thing, Be Here and Golden Road.

It was released on 11 May 2012 and debuted at number one on the ARIA Charts and was the nineteenth biggest-selling album in Australia in 2012.

== Track listing ==
The Story So Far has 19 tracks.

No.	Title	Writer(s)	Length
1.	"Kiss a Girl"	Monty Powell; Keith Urban	3:47
2.	"Long Hot Summer"	Richard Marx; Urban	4:33
3.	"Somebody Like You" (radio remix)	John Shanks; Urban	3:50
4.	"Making Memories of Us" (radio single edit)	Rodney Crowell	3:55
5.	"Days Go By"	Powell; Urban	3:48
6.	"Put You in a Song"	Sarah Buxton; Jedd Hughes; Urban	3:40
7.	"Without You"	Dave Pahanish; Joe West	3:56
8.	"You Look Good in My Shirt"	Tony Martin; Mark Nesler; Tom Shapiro	3:47
9.	"Stupid Boy"	Dave Berg; Deanna Bryant; Buxton	6:21
10.	"Once in a Lifetime" (radio edit)	Shanks; Urban	4:11
11.	"Sweet Thing"	Powell; Urban	3:50
12.	"You'll Think of Me" (single edit)	Darrell Brown; Dennis Matkosky; Ty Lacy	3:51
13.	"I Told You So" (single edit)	Urban	4:02
14.	"Only You Can Love Me This Way"	Steve McEwan; John Reid	4:08
15.	"You're My Better Half" (single edit)	Shanks; Urban	4:12
16.	"Tonight I Wanna Cry"	Powell; Urban	4:19
17.	"For You"	Powell; Urban	4:49
18.	"Raining on Sunday" (single edit)	Brown; Radney Foster	3:54
19.	"Better Life"	Marx; Urban	4:44
Total length:			80:50

== Charts ==
=== Weekly charts ===
Chart (2012–14)	Peak position
Australian Albums (ARIA)	1
New Zealand Albums (RMNZ)	26

=== Year-end charts ===
Chart (2012)	Position
Australian Albums Chart	19
Chart (2013)	Position
Australian Albums Chart	74
Chart (2014)	Position
Australian Albums Chart	94

=== Decade-end charts ===
Chart (2010–2019)	Position
Australian Albums (ARIA)	57
Australian Artist Albums (ARIA)	8

== Certifications ==
Region	Certification	Certified units/sales
Australia (ARIA)	3× Platinum	210,000^{‡}
^{‡} Sales+streaming figures based on certification alone.
