= Get Closer 2011 World Tour =

2011 concert tour by Keith Urban

- World tour by Keith Urban
- Promotional poster
- Location: North America; Australia
- Associated album: Get Closer
- Start date: 8 April 2011
- End date: 15 October 2011
- Legs: 2
- No. of shows: 5 in Australia; 55 in North America; 60 Total

Keith Urban concert chronology
- Summer Lovin' 2010 Tour (2010); Get Closer 2011 World Tour (2011); Light the Fuse Tour (2013)

The Get Closer 2011 World Tour was the seventh headlining tour by Australian country music singer Keith Urban, in support of his seventh studio album Get Closer (2010). It began on 8 April 2011 in Adelaide, Australia and ended on 15 October 2011 in Minneapolis, Minnesota. The tour visited both Australia and North America.

== Background ==
The Australian leg of the tour was first announced 13 December 2010. The North American leg of the tour was first announced on 22 November 2010.

== Opening acts ==
- Lady Antebellum (Australia & North America)
- Jake Owen (North America)

== Setlist ==
1. "Put You in a Song"
2. "I Told You So"
3. "Long Hot Summer"
4. "Stupid Boy"
5. "Days Go By"
6. "Silly Love Songs" (Wings cover)
7. "You Gonna Fly"
8. "Making Memories of Us"
9. "I'm In"
10. "Boondocks" (Little Big Town cover)
11. "Jeans On"
12. "You'll Think of Me"
13. "Georgia Woods"
14. "'Til Summer Comes Around"
15. "Sweet Thing"
16. "Kiss a Girl"
17. "Without You"
18. "Somebody Like You"
19. "Are You Sure Hank Done It This Way" (Waylon Jennings cover)
20. "Who Wouldn't Wanna Be Me"
21. "With or Without You" (U2 cover)
22. "American Girl" (Tom Petty and the Heartbreakers cover)
23. "It's a Long Way to the Top (If You Wanna Rock 'n' Roll)" (AC/DC cover)
24. "You Look Good in My Shirt"

Encore

25. "Raining on Sunday"
26. "Tonight I Wanna Cry"
27. "Better Life"

== Tour dates ==
| Date | City | Country | Venue |
Australia
| 8 April 2011 | Adelaide | Australia | Adelaide Entertainment Centre |
| 9 April 2011 | Melbourne | Australia | Rod Laver Arena |
| 12 April 2011 | Tamworth | Australia | Tamworth Regional Entertainment Centre |
| 14 April 2011 | Sydney | Australia | Sydney Entertainment Centre |
| 15 April 2011 | Brisbane | Australia | Brisbane Entertainment Centre |
North America
| 16 June 2011 | Biloxi | United States | Mississippi Coast Coliseum |
| 17 June 2011 | Jacksonville | United States | Jacksonville Veterans Memorial Arena |
| 18 June 2011 | Tampa | United States | St. Pete Times Forum |
| 23 June 2011 | Columbia | United States | Colonial Life Arena |
| 24 June 2011 | Charlotte | United States | Time Warner Cable Arena |
| 25 June 2011 | Raleigh | United States | RBC Center |
| 29 June 2011 | St. Louis | United States | Scottrade Center |
| 30 June 2011 | Moline | United States | iWireless Center |
| 7 July 2011 | Hershey | United States | Giant Center |
| 8 July 2011 | Boston | United States | TD Garden |
| 9 July 2011 | Uncasville | United States | Mohegan Sun Arena |
| 14 July 2011 | Newark | United States | Prudential Center |
| 15 July 2011 | Philadelphia | United States | Wells Fargo Center |
| 16 July 2011 | Albany | United States | Times Union Center |
| 19 July 2011 | Columbus | United States | Nationwide Arena |
| 21 July 2011 | Cleveland | United States | Quicken Loans Arena |
| 22 July 2011 | Grand Rapids | United States | Van Andel Arena |
| 23 July 2011 | Auburn Hills | United States | The Palace of Auburn Hills |
| 26 July 2011 | Hampton | United States | Hampton Coliseum |
| 28 July 2011 | Washington, D.C. | United States | Verizon Center |
| 29 July 2011 | Toledo | United States | Huntington Center |
| 31 July 2011 | Fort Wayne | United States | Allen County War Memorial Coliseum |
| 4 August 2011 | Duluth | United States | Arena at Gwinnett Center |
| 6 August 2011 | Nashville | United States | Bridgestone Arena |
| 11 August 2011 | Cincinnati | United States | US Bank Arena |
| 12 August 2011 | Knoxville | United States | Thompson–Boling Arena |
| 13 August 2011 | Augusta | United States | James Brown Arena |
| 16 August 2011 | Wichita | United States | Intrust Bank Arena |
| 18 August 2011 | Tulsa | United States | BOK Center |
| 19 August 2011 | Kansas City | United States | Sprint Center |
| 20 August 2011 | Omaha | United States | Qwest Center |
| 25 August 2011 | Jonesboro | United States | Convocation Center |
| 26 August 2011 | Tupelo | United States | BancorpSouth Arena |
| 27 August 2011 | Lafayette | United States | Cajundome |
| 28 August 2011 | Dallas | United States | American Airlines Center |
| 8 September 2011 | Buffalo | United States | HSBC Arena |
| 9 September 2011 | Ottawa | Canada | Scotiabank Place |
| 10 September 2011 | Toronto | Canada | Air Canada Centre |
| 12 September 2011 | London | Canada | John Labatt Centre |
| 15 September 2011 | Winnipeg | Canada | MTS Centre |
| 16 September 2011 | Regina | Canada | Brandt Centre |
| 17 September 2011 | Saskatoon | Canada | Credit Union Centre |
| 21 September 2011 | Edmonton | Canada | Rexall Place |
| 23 September 2011 | Calgary | Canada | Scotiabank Saddledome |
| 26 September 2011 | Vancouver | Canada | Rogers Arena |
| 29 September 2011 | Seattle | United States | KeyArena |
| 1 October 2011 | San Jose | United States | HP Pavilion |
| 2 October 2011 | Sacramento | United States | ARCO Arena |
| 4 October 2011 | Fresno | United States | Save Mart Center |
| 7 October 2011 | Glendale | United States | Jobing.com Arena |
| 8 October 2011 | Los Angeles | United States | Staples Center |
| 11 October 2011 | Denver | United States | Pepsi Center |
| 13 October 2011 | Milwaukee | United States | Bradley Center |
| 14 October 2011 | Rosemont | United States | Allstate Arena |
| 15 October 2011 | Minneapolis | United States | Target Center |
