= Light the Fuse Tour =

2013–14 concert tour by Keith Urban

- Tour by Keith Urban
- Promotional poster for the tour.
- Location: North America; Australia
- Associated album: Fuse
- Start date: 18 July 2013
- End date: 29 June 2014
- Legs: 4
- No. of shows: 70 in North America; 9 in Australia; 79 Total
- Box office: $10,546,656

Keith Urban concert chronology
- Get Closer World Tour (2011); Light the Fuse Tour (2013–14); Raise 'Em Up Tour (2014)

The Light the Fuse Tour is the eighth headlining concert tour by New Zealand born-Australian country music singer Keith Urban, in support of his eighth studio album Fuse (2013). This is the first headlining amphitheater tour for Urban, playing in over seventy cities across the United States and Canada. The tour also traveled to Australia. It began on 18 July 2013 and finished on 29 June 2014.

== Background ==
The Light the Fuse Tour was first announced on 25 March 2013. Even though the new record will not be out before the tour begins Urban promises to play songs off it. The tour began on 18 July 2013, in Cincinnati, the second leg began on 18 October 2013, in Omaha. Additional dates were announced on 22 August 2013. The third North American leg began on 9 January 2014, and lasted until 1 February. Urban embarked on the Australian leg on 4 June, and the tour concluded on 29 June.

== Opening acts ==
- Little Big Town (North America)
- Dustin Lynch (North America)
- Sheppard (Australia)

== Setlist ==
1. "Long Hot Summer"
2. "Sweet Thing"
3. "I Told You So"
4. "Stupid Boy"
5. "Even the Stars Fall For You"
6. "You Gonna Fly"
7. "Without You"
8. "Kiss a Girl"
9. "Won't Get Fooled Again" Intro (The Who cover)
10. "Days Go By"
11. "Rumour Has It" (Adele cover)
12. "Making Memories of Us"
13. "Better Life"
14. "You'll Think of Me"
15. "Who Wouldn't Wanna Be Me"
16. "Locked Out of Heaven" (Bruno Mars cover/Snippet, sung by Brian Nutter))
17. "Somebody Like You"

=== Encore ===
1. "Tonight I Wanna Cry"
2. "You Look Good in My Shirt"

=== Notes ===
- "Good Thing" in Louisville.

== Tour dates ==
Date	City	Country	Venue
North America Leg 1
18 July 2013	Cincinnati	United States	Riverbend Music Center
19 July 2013 ^{[A]}	Twin Lakes	United States	Country Thunder
20 July 2013 ^{[B]}	Monticello	United States	Great Jones County Fair
25 July 2013	Charlotte	United States	Verizon Wireless Amphitheatre
26 July 2013	Raleigh	United States	Time Warner Cable Music Pavilion
27 July 2013	Alpharetta	United States	Verizon Wireless Amphitheatre
4 August 2013	Clarkston	United States	DTE Energy Music Theatre
8 August 2013	Columbia	United States	Merriweather Post Pavilion
9 August 2013	Hopewell	United States	CMAC
10 August 2013	Mansfield	United States	Comcast Center
15 August 2013	Austin	United States	Austin360 Amphitheater
16 August 2013	The Woodlands	United States	Cynthia Woods Mitchell Pavilion
17 August 2013	Dallas	United States	Gexa Energy Pavilion
22 August 2013	Pelham	United States	Verizon Wireless Music Center
23 August 2013	Maryland Heights	United States	Verizon Wireless Amphitheater
24 August 2013	Noblesville	United States	Klipsch Music Center
28 August 2013	Albuquerque	United States	Sandia Casino Amphitheater
30 August 2013 ^{C}	Morrison	United States	Red Rocks Amphitheatre
5 September 2013	Baltimore	United States	Maryland Science Center
12 September 2013	Cuyahoga Falls	United States	Blossom Music Center
13 September 2013	Burgettstown	United States	First Niagara Pavilion
14 September 2013	Camden	United States	Susquehanna Bank Center
21 September 2013	Mountain View	United States	Shoreline Amphitheatre
4 October 2013	Tampa	United States	MidFlorida Credit Union Amphitheatre
5 October 2013	West Palm Beach	United States	Cruzan Amphitheatre
North America Leg 2
18 October 2013	Omaha	United States	CenturyLink Center Omaha
19 October 2013	Oklahoma City	United States	Chesapeake Energy Arena
20 October 2013	Springfield	United States	JQH Arena
25 October 2013	Tulsa	United States	BOK Center
26 October 2013	Bossier City	United States	CenturyLink Center
27 October 2013	Lafayette	United States	Cajundome
8 November 2013	Kansas City	United States	Sprint Center
9 November 2013	Des Moines	United States	Wells Fargo Arena
10 November 2013	Peoria	United States	Peoria Civic Center
14 November 2013	Manchester	United States	Verizon Wireless Arena
15 November 2013	Uncasville	United States	Mohegan Sun Arena
16 November 2013	Uncasville	United States	Mohegan Sun Arena
22 November 2013	State College	United States	Bryce Jordan Center
23 November 2013	Fairfax	United States	Patriot Center
24 November 2013	Toledo	United States	Huntington Center
6 December 2013	Greenville	United States	Bon Secours Wellness Arena
7 December 2013	Charleston	United States	Charleston Civic Center
8 December 2013	Louisville	United States	KFC Yum! Center
North America Leg 3
9 January 2014	Grand Rapids	United States	Van Andel Arena
10 January 2014	Chicago	United States	United Center
11 January 2014	Minneapolis	United States	Target Center
15 January 2014	Vancouver	Canada	Rogers Arena
17 January 2014	Calgary	Canada	Scotiabank Saddledome
18 January 2014	Edmonton	Canada	Rexall Place
20 January 2014	Winnipeg	Canada	MTS Centre
23 January 2014	London	Canada	Budweiser Gardens
24 January 2014	Toronto	Canada	Air Canada Centre
29 January 2014	New York City	United States	Madison Square Garden
31 January 2014	Knoxville	United States	Thompson–Boling Arena
1 February 2014	Nashville	United States	Bridgestone Arena
Australia
4 June 2014	Townsville	Australia	1300 Smiles Stadium
17 June 2014	Brisbane	Australia	Brisbane Entertainment Centre
18 June 2014	Brisbane	Australia	Brisbane Entertainment Centre
21 June 2014	Sydney	Australia	Allphones Arena
22 June 2014	Sydney	Australia	Allphones Arena
25 June 2014	Melbourne	Australia	Rod Laver Arena
26 June 2014	Melbourne	Australia	Rod Laver Arena
27 June 2014	Narrabri	Australia	Collins Park
29 June 2014	Perth	Australia	Perth Arena

Festivals and other miscellaneous performances
^{A} This concert is a part of the Country Thunder.
^{B} This concert is a part of the Great Jones County Fair.
^{C} This concert is Urban with Little Big Town only.

== Box office score data ==
Venue	City	Tickets sold / available	Gross revenue
Thompson–Boling Arena	Knoxville	8,403 / 10,081	$469,136
Bridgestone Arena	Nashville	13,558 / 13, 557	$769,091
Rogers Arena	Vancouver	11,723 / 13,700	$863,287
Scotiabank Saddledome	Calgary	12,240 / 13,159	$906,480
Rexall Place	Edmonton	12,379 / 12,379	$932,832
MTS Centre	Winnipeg	9,201 / 11,868	$686,268
Air Canada Centre	Toronto	13,902 / 15,830	$993,049
1,300 Smiles Stadium	Townsville	11,600 / 14,678	$217,450
Brisbane Entertainment Centre	Brisbane	14,623 / 18,292	$1,651,720
Allphones Arena	Sydney	19,868 / 21,220	$2,245,750
Perth Arena	Perth	7,410 / 7,886	$819,653
TOTAL		134,907 / 152,651	$10,546,656

== Critical reception ==
Chuck Dauphin of Billboard (magazine) says, Urban "proved why he is held in such high esteem by critics and fans alike. The singer delivered one of the strongest performances of any country artist this year—or the past few years for that matter."
