= Raise 'Em Up Tour =

2014 concert tour by Keith Urban

- Tour by Keith Urban
- Promotional poster for the tour
- Location: North America
- Associated album: Fuse
- Start date: 12 July 2014
- End date: 7 September 2014
- Legs: 1
- No. of shows: 25 in North America
- Box office: $10,868,414

Keith Urban concert chronology
- Light the Fuse Tour (2013-14); Raise 'Em Up Tour (2014); Ripcord World Tour (2016)

The Raise 'Em Up Tour was the ninth headlining tour by Australian country music singer Keith Urban, in support of his eighth studio album Fuse (2013). The tour began on 12 July 2014 in Calgary, Canada and ended on 7 September 2014 in Wheatland, California. This tour started two weeks after he completed the Light the Fuse Tour.

== Concert synopsis ==
During the show Urban goes out and performs on a small stage. While performing on the small stage in Calgary, Urban invited country singer Lindsay Ell to sing Miranda Lambert's part in "We Were Us".

== Opening acts ==
- Jerrod Niemann
- Brett Eldredge

== Setlist ==
1. "Love's Poster Child"
2. "Sweet Thing"
3. "Somewhere in My Car"
4. "Only You Can Love Me This Way"
5. "Long Hot Summer"
6. "Even the Stars Fall 4 U"
7. "Shame"
8. "Kiss a Girl"
9. "Who Wouldn't Wanna Be Me"
10. "Used to the Pain"
11. "Stupid Boy"
12. "Come Back to Me"
13. "Little Bit of Everything"
14. "Days Go By"
15. "Put You in a Song"
16. "You Look Good in My Shirt"
17. "Cop Car"
18. "Once in a Lifetime"
19. "You Gonna Fly"

Encore

20. "Making Memories of Us"
21. "Raining on Sunday"
22. "Good Thing"
23. "Better Life" (acoustic)
24. "Somebody Like You" (with a snippet of Queen's "Another One Bites the Dust")

== Tour dates ==
| Date | City | Country | Venue | Attendance | Gross revenue |
|---|---|---|---|---|---|
North America
| 12 July 2014 ^{[A]} | Calgary | Canada | Calgary Stampede | 13,221 / 13,221 (100%) | $1,105,960 |
| 13 July 2014 ^{[B]} | Craven | Canada | Craven Country Jamboree | — | — |
| 16 July 2014 ^{[C]} | Morristown | United States | Jamboree in the Hills | — | — |
| 17 July 2014 | Atlantic City | United States | The Borgata | 1,780 / 3,008 (59%) | $236,075 |
| 19 July 2014 ^{[D]} | Brooklyn | United States | Michigan International Speedway | — | — |
| 22 July 2014 ^{[E]} | Harrington | United States | Delaware State Fair | 8,401 / 9,609 (87%) | $529,434 |
| 24 July 2014 | Gilford | United States | Bank of New Hampshire Pavilion | 8,085 / 8,085 (100%) | $535,118 |
| 25 July 2014 | Darien Center | United States | Darien Lake Performing Arts Center | 12,880 / 21,800 (59%) | $469,110 |
| 26 July 2014 | Mansfield | United States | Xfinity Center | 18,571 / 19,900 (93%) | $685,768 |
| 31 July 2014 | Cincinnati | United States | Riverbend Music Center | 13,500 / 20,427 (66%) | $438,478 |
| 1 August 2014 | Maryland Heights | United States | Verizon Wireless Amphitheater | 14,760 / 20,000 (74%) | $494,627 |
| 2 August 2014 | Noblesville | United States | Klipsch Music Center | 15,864 / 24,425 (64%) | $537,480 |
| 8 August 2014 | Raleigh | United States | Walnut Creek Amphitheatre | 16,620 / 20,045 (83%) | $464,778 |
| 9 August 2014 | Virginia Beach | United States | Farm Bureau Live | 13,662 / 20,055 (68%) | $439,590 |
| 15 August 2014 | Holmdel | United States | PNC Bank Arts Center | 16,148 / 16,890 (96%) | $648,525 |
| 16 August 2014 | Hartford | United States | Xfinity Theatre | 11,269 / 24,087 (47%) | $365,729 |
| 17 August 2014 | Bethel | United States | Bethel Woods Center for the Arts | 11,746 / 15,822 (74%) | $481,492 |
| 22 August 2014 | Charlotte | United States | PNC Music Pavilion | 10,617 / 18,808 (56%) | $358,858 |
| 23 August 2014 | Pelham | United States | Oak Mountain Amphitheatre | 7,690 / 10,291 (75%) | $304,287 |
| 24 August 2014 | Alpharetta | United States | Verizon Wireless Amphitheatre | 11,070 / 12,725 (87%) | $567,420 |
| 29 August 2014 | Englewood | United States | Fiddler's Green Amphitheatre | 15,323 / 16,848 (91%) | $703,515 |
| 30 August 2014 | West Valley City | United States | USANA Amphitheatre | 14,154 / 20,000 (71%) | $539,973 |
| 31 August 2014 | Paradise | United States | The Chelsea Ballroom | 2,735 / 2,900 (94%) | $220,525 |
| 5 September 2014 | Irvine | United States | Verizon Wireless Amphitheatre | 12,550 / 15,000 (84%) | $438,763 |
| 6 September 2014 | Mountain View | United States | Shoreline Amphitheatre | 12,584 / 22,000 (58%) | — |
| 7 September 2014 | Wheatland | United States | Sleep Train Amphitheatre | 8,242 / 15,584 (53%) | $302,909 |
| Total | | | | 271,472 / 371,530 (73%) | $10,868,414 |

Festivals

- ^{A} This concert is a part of the Calgary Stampede.
- ^{B} This concert is a part of the Craven Country Jamboree.
- ^{C} This concert is a part of the Jamboree in the Hills.
- ^{D} This concert is a part of the Faster Horses Festival.
- ^{E} This concert is a part of the Delaware State Fair.

== Critical reception ==
Eric Volmez of the Calgary Herald says, "Urban's fiery return to the Saddledome for a Stampede concert Saturday was his second stop this year to promote 2013's Fuse and further proof that he has easily mastered into one of the genre's most reliable exciting concert draws over the past decade, heads and shoulders above most of his cowboy hat/baseball cap-wearing brethren that dominate the charts."
