= Act of Valor: The Album =

Soundtrack album by Various artists
- Released: February 21, 2012
- Genre: Country
- Length: 41:24
- Label: Relativity
- Producers: Kenny Beard; Kristian Bush; Mickey Jack Cones; Hunter Hayes; Dave Haywood; Dann Huff; Kyle Jacobs; Wynonna Judd; Michael Knox; Matt McClure; Mouse McCoy; Cactus Moser; Keith Urban; Scott Waugh; Phillip White; Fred Wilhelm

Singles from Act of Valor: The Album
- 1. "For You" Released: April 16, 2012

Professional ratings
Review scores
Source	Rating
Taste of Country	3/5 stars

Act of Valor: The Album is the soundtrack to the 2012 film Act of Valor. It was released on February 24, 2012. It consists of ten songs, all performed by country music singers.

== Content ==
Keith Urban's "For You" was released as a single from the album, and all proceeds from the single were donated to the Navy SEAL foundation. Lady Antebellum's "I Was Here" was previously released on AT&T Team USA Soundtrack in 2009.

== Critical reception ==
Giving it three stars out of five, Billy Dukes of Taste of Country criticized the "homogenized" production but praised the vocals. He also said that "On its own it's little more than a depressing collection of songs by really talented country artists. However, each song will no doubt take on new meaning after watching scenes of US Navy SEALS on the big screen." Great American Country's Daryl Addison called it "in essence a concept album that is on one hand magnificently Patriotic, and on the other artistically thought-provoking."

== Track listing ==
No.	Title	Writer(s)	Artist	Length
1.	"For You"	Keith Urban, Monty Powell	Keith Urban	4:49
2.	"Guide You Home"	Kristian Bush, Jennifer Nettles	Sugarland	3:51
3.	"I Was Here"	Hillary Scott, Victoria Shaw, Gary Burr	Lady Antebellum	3:40
4.	"The Best I Can"	Jake Owen, Phillip White	Jake Owen	3:45
5.	"If the Sun Comes Up"	George Teren, Ray Scott	Trace Adkins	4:29
6.	"Two Soldiers Coming Home"	Lori McKenna, Fred Wilhelm	Lori McKenna	3:26
7.	"What It Takes"	Barry Dean, Andrew Dorff, Troy Verges	Montgomery Gentry	3:42
8.	"The Best of Me"	Josh Kelley, Kyle Jacobs, Rachel Thibodeau	Josh Kelley	3:27
9.	"Where We Left Off"	Hunter Hayes, Dean	Hunter Hayes	4:56
10.	"Whatever Brings You Back"	Ronnie Bowman, White	Wynonna Judd	5:20
Total length:				41:24

== Chart performance ==
=== Album ===
Chart (2012)	Peak Position
US Billboard 200	47
US Billboard Top Country Albums	8
US Billboard Top Independent Albums	5
US Billboard Top Soundtracks	4

=== Singles ===
Year	Single	Artist	Peak chart positions		
Year	Single	Artist	US Country	US	CAN
2012	"For You"	Keith Urban	6	55	84
