= Get Closer (Keith Urban album) =

Studio album by Keith Urban
- Released: 16 November 2010
- Recorded: 2010
- Genres: Country pop; pop rock; country rock
- Length: 33:38 (standard edition); 78:21 (deluxe edition)
- Labels: Hit Red; Capitol Nashville
- Producers: Dann Huff; Keith Urban; Chris McHugh (live tracks)

Keith Urban chronology
Defying Gravity (2009)	Get Closer (2010)	The Story So Far (2012)

Singles from Get Closer
- 1. "Put You in a Song" Released: 13 September 2010; 2. "Without You" Released: 7 February 2011; 3. "Long Hot Summer" Released: 27 June 2011; 4. "You Gonna Fly" Released: 24 October 2011

Get Closer is the seventh studio album by Australian country music artist Keith Urban. It was released on 16 November 2010 via Hit Red and Capitol Nashville. It produced four singles between 2010 and 2011, three of which went to number one on the U.S. Billboard Hot Country Songs chart. This was Urban's first album to not be certified Platinum. It is also his first to not have a single reach the top 40 on the Billboard Hot 100 chart.

== Content ==
The lead single, "Put You in a Song", was co-written by Keith Urban along with fellow artists Sarah Buxton (who co-wrote Urban's 2006 single "Stupid Boy") and Jedd Hughes. From 26 October (Urban's 43rd birthday) to 9 November 2010, one track from the album was released to the US iTunes Store each week (a trend Urban's previous album Defying Gravity followed). Those songs were "Without You", "Long Hot Summer", and "You Gonna Fly" respectively. These three songs (beginning with "Long Hot Summer") were released to the Australian iTunes store on 22 October 29 October, and 5 November 2010. The full album was released on 12 November in Australia.

"Without You", "Long Hot Summer", and "You Gonna Fly" were all released as the album's second, third, and fourth singles in 2011 and they all reached number one on the country charts. Urban co-produced the studio tracks with Dann Huff, and the live bonus tracks with Chris McHugh.

== Cover art ==
Before the album's release, Urban announced a contest in which fans vote for which photo to be the album cover. On 11 October 2010, the official album cover was revealed; it depicts Urban sitting in front of a bed with his guitar beside him.

== Reception ==
=== Commercial ===
The album debuted at number seven on the U.S. Billboard 200 and number two on the U.S. Billboard Top Country Albums, selling 162,000 copies its first week of release. As of 4 August 2013, the album has sold 743,000 copies in the US. The album was certified Platinum by the RIAA for one million units in sales, tracks and streams on 17 April 2017.

=== Critical ===
Professional ratings
Review scores
Source	Rating
Allmusic	4/5 stars
The Boston Globe	(favorable)
Country Weekly	4/5 stars
Entertainment Weekly	(B)
Los Angeles Times	4/5 stars
The New York Times	3.5/5 stars
Rolling Stone	3/5 stars
Roughstock	3.5/5 stars
Slant Magazine	3.5/5 stars
The Washington Post	(favorable)

Upon its release, Get Closer received generally positive reviews from most music critics. At Metacritic, which assigns a normalized rating out of 100 to reviews from mainstream critics, the album received an average score of 76, based on 7 reviews, which indicates "generally favorable reviews".

Jessica Phillips of Country Weekly gave it a four-star rating, saying "the sugared tunes would be easy to dismiss except for the credible guitar riffs, foot-tapping rhythms and fiery passion with which Keith sings". Andrew Leahey of Allmusic gave it a four star rating, calling it "a lean collection of country-rockers and bedroom ballads". Sarah Rodman of The Boston Globe gave it a favorable review, describing it as something "lean but enjoyable". Blake Boldt of Engine 145 gave the album 3½, responding with "On Get Closer, the affable Aussie celebrates life with a group of eight uplifting songs offering one cohesive message: love is grand".

Matt Bjorke of Roughstock gave it a 3½-star rating, saying "this album is all about happiness with your romantic life. Every song on this short 8 track album discusses matters of the heart with each song discussing various ways that relationships can have on a life". Bill Friskics-Warren of The Washington Post gave it a favorable review, saying "if you're not in the mood for love, the music here – highly burnished country-rock – affords pleasures of its own". Jonathan Keefe with Slant Magazine gave it 3½ stars, calling it "vintage Urban" and saying that "Get Closer his is most carefully edited album, if not necessarily his best". Rolling Stone critic Jon Dolan gave it a 3 star rating, calling it "good-natured country rock".

== Track listing ==
Standard edition
No.	Title	Writer(s)	Length
1.	"Put You in a Song"	Keith Urban; Sarah Buxton; Jedd Hughes	3:39
2.	"You Gonna Fly"	Preston Brust; Chris Lucas; Jaren Johnston	3:36
3.	"All for You"	Busbee; Chris Eaton	3:37
4.	"Long Hot Summer"	Urban; Richard Marx	4:32
5.	"Without You"	Joe West; Dave Pahanish	3:54
6.	"Georgia Woods"	Urban; Darrell Brown	5:17
7.	"Right On Back to You"	Urban; Brown	4:47
8.	"Shut Out the Lights"	Urban; Monty Powell	4:16
Total length:			33:38

Australian edition bonus tracks
No.	Title	Writer(s)	Length
9.	"Big Promises"	Urban; Dan Wilson	3:47
10.	"The Luxury of Knowing"	Lori McKenna	4:14
Total length:			41:11

Target deluxe edition bonus tracks
No.	Title	Writer(s)	Length
9.	"Big Promises"	Urban; Dan Wilson	3:47
10.	"The Luxury of Knowing"	Lori McKenna	4:14
11.	"Winning"	Russell Glyn Ballard	3:38
12.	"Once in a Lifetime" (live)	Urban; John Shanks	7:09
13.	"You Look Good in My Shirt" (live)	Mark Nesler; Tom Shapiro; Tony Martin	5:18
14.	"Better Life" (live)	Urban; Marx	5:42
15.	"Everybody" (live)	Urban; Marx	6:55
Total length:			78:21

== Personnel ==
Technical

- Justin Niebank – engineer, mixing
- Drew Bollman – engineer, mixing assistant
- David Bryant – assistant engineer
- Joanna Carter – art direction
- Mark Dobson – engineer
- Mike "Frog" Griffith – production coordination
- Mark Hagen – engineer
- Michelle Hall – art producer
- Dann Huff – producer
- Jean-Philippe Piter – photography
- Matt Rausch – assistant engineer
- Jason Spence – assistant engineer
- Keith Urban – producer
- Max Vadukul – photography
- Hank Williams – mastering

Musicians

- Keith Urban – lead vocals, acoustic guitar, electric guitar, banjo, bouzouki, whistle, EBow
- Sarah Buxton – background vocals (on "You Gonna Fly")
- Eric Darken – percussion
- Dan Dugmore – steel guitar
- Stuart Duncan – fiddle
- Karen Fairchild – background vocals (on "You Gonna Fly")
- Dann Huff – acoustic guitar, electric guitar, banjo, EBow, mandocello, mandolin
- David Huff – percussion, programming
- Charlie Judge – keyboards, string arrangements, strings
- Chris McHugh – drums, percussion
- Gordon Mote – piano
- Kimberly Schlapman – background vocals (on "You Gonna Fly")
- Jimmie Lee Sloas – bass guitar
- Russell Terrell – background vocals
- Ilya Toshinsky – acoustic guitar, electric guitar, banjo, resonator guitar, mandolin

== Charts and certifications ==
=== Weekly charts ===
Chart (2010–2011)	Peak position
Australian Albums (ARIA)	11
Australian Country Albums (ARIA)	2
Canadian Albums (Billboard)	8
UK Country Albums (Official Charts)	13
US Billboard 200	7
US Top Country Albums (Billboard)	2

=== Year-end charts ===
Chart (2011)	Position
US Billboard 200	36
US Top Country Albums (Billboard)	9

=== Certifications ===
Region	Certification	Certified units/sales
Australia (ARIA)	Platinum	70,000^{^}
Canada (Music Canada)	Gold	40,000^{^}
United States (RIAA)	Platinum	1,000,000^{‡} / 743,000
^{^} Shipments figures based on certification alone.

=== Singles ===
Year	Single	Peak chart positions			
Year	Single	US Country	US	CAN	AUS
2010	"Put You in a Song"	2	53	49	—
2011	"Without You"	1	52	69	39
2011	"Long Hot Summer"	1	45	35	82
2011	"You Gonna Fly"	1	54	66	—
"—" denotes releases that did not chart
