= Coastal Credit Union Music Park =

Amphitheatre and music venue in Raleigh, North Carolina, United States

Coordinates: 35.749490°N 78.576424°W

- Walnut Creek Amphitheatre
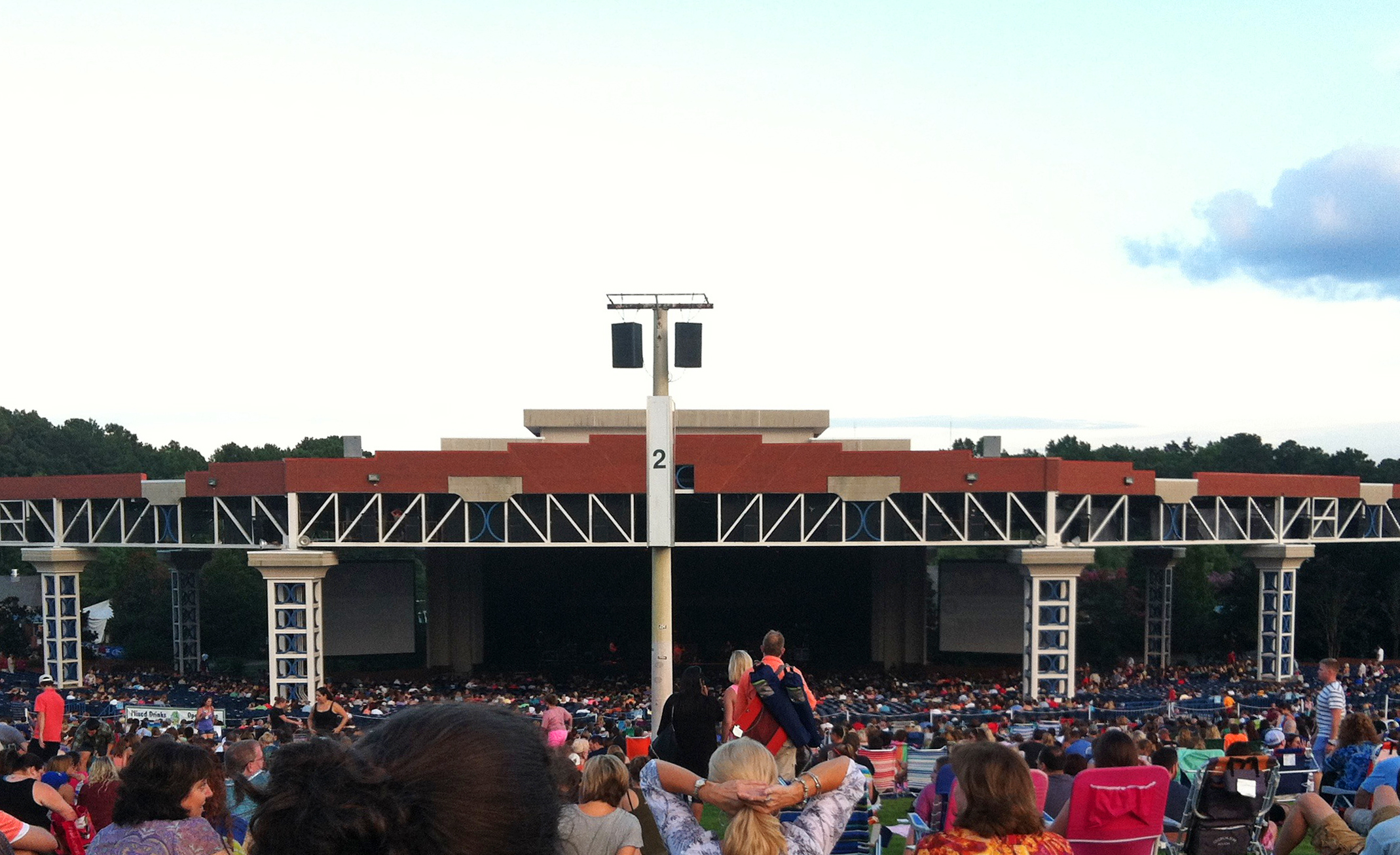
- Interactive map of Coastal Credit Union Music Park
- Former names: Walnut Creek Amphitheatre (1991–98, 2007-08, 2013-16) Alltel Pavilion (1999–2007) Time Warner Cable Music Pavilion (2008–13)
- Address: 3801 Rock Quarry Rd; Raleigh, North Carolina, U.S. 27610-5123
- Location: Southeast Raleigh
- Owner: City of Raleigh
- Operator: Live Nation Entertainment
- Capacity: 20,601
- Type: Outdoor amphitheater

Construction
- Opened: July 4, 1991
- Cost: $13.5 million ($35.1 million in 2025 dollars)

Website
- www.livenation.com

Coastal Credit Union Music Park (originally named Walnut Creek Amphitheatre and formerly Alltel Pavilion) is an outdoor amphitheater located in Raleigh, North Carolina, United States, that specializes in hosting large concerts.

The amphitheater is part of a 77-acre (310,000 m^{2}) complex, located on the west bank of Walnut Creek, southeast of Raleigh, near the I-40/US 64/I-440 (Beltline) interchange.

It was built by the City of Raleigh, with private sector participation, at a cost of $13.5 million and opened on July 4, 1991, with the Connells as the inaugural act.

Seating capacity is about 6,847, of which about half are under cover; the open lawn can accommodate another 13,653.

The venue is operated by Live Nation Entertainment, a concert promoting company, under lease from the City of Raleigh.

== Events ==
List of events held at the Amphitheatre
| Artist | Event | Date | Opening act(s) |
|---|---|---|---|
| 3 Doors Down | Seventeen Days Tour | September 9, 2005 | Shinedown, Staind, Alter Bridge |
| 5 Seconds of Summer | Rock Out with Your Socks Out Tour | September 10, 2015 | Hey Violet |
| 50 Cent | The Final Lap Tour | August 15, 2023 | Busta Rhymes, Jeremih |
| 311 | Transistor Tour | August 30, 1997 | De La Soul |
| 311 | Summer Unity Tour | July 23, 2008 | Snoop Dogg & Fiction Plane |
| 311 | Summer Unity Tour | July 5, 2009 | Ziggy Marley & the Expendables |
| 311 | Summer Unity Tour | August 2, 2011 | Sublime with Rome, DJ Soulman, DJ Trichrome |
| 311 | Summer Unity Tour | July 25, 2012 | Slightly Stoopid & the Aggrolites |
| 10,000 Maniacs | Our Time in Eden Tour | June 25, 1993 | World Party |
| Aly & AJ | NextFest Tour | August 22, 2007 | Drake Bell, Corbin Bleu, Bianca Ryan |
| Aaron Carter | Rock, Rap N' Retro Tour | August 29, 2002 | Jump5, No Secrets, Triple Image |
| Adam Wakeman | 2003 Tour | August 31, 2003 | —N/a |
| Aerosmith | Get a Grip Tour | September 25, 1993 | 4 Non Blondes |
| Aerosmith | Get a Grip Tour | September 16, 1994 | Collective Soul |
| Aerosmith | Nine Lives Tour | September 23, 1997 | 4 Non Blondes |
| Aerosmith | Nine Lives Tour | October 1, 1998 | Monster Magnet |
| Aerosmith | Just Push Play Tour | September 17, 2001 | Fuel |
| Aerosmith | Girls of Summer Tour | October 12, 2002 | Kid Rock; Run–D.M.C. Must |
| Aerosmith and Kiss | AeroKiss Tour | September 20, 2003 | Saliva |
| Aerosmith and Mötley Crüe | Route of All Evil Tour | October 23, 2006 | Lennon Murphy |
| Al Haymon | Al Haymon Summer Festival Tour | August 1, 2012 | —N/a |
| Alabama | Twentieth Century Tour | August 5, 1999 | —N/a |
| Alabama | 2000 Tour | August 5, 2000 | —N/a |
| Alabama | Farewell Tour | July 12, 2003 | —N/a |
| Alan Jackson | A Lot About Livin' (And a Little 'bout Love) Tour | July 10, 1992 | —N/a |
| Alan Jackson | Drive Tour | April 21, 2002 | Rascal Flatts; Cyndi Thomson |
| Alan Jackson | What I Do Tour | May 14, 2004 | Martina McBride |
| Alan Jackson | 2005 Tour | May 6, 2005 | Sara Evans |
| Alan Jackson | Good Time Tour | August 22, 2009 | Josh Turner |
| Alanis Morissette | Can't Not Tour | September 18, 1996 | K's Choice |
| Alanis Morissette | So-Called Chaos/Au Naturale Tour | August 7, 2004 | Barenaked Ladies |
| Alanis Morissette | 2021 World Tour | August 22, 2021 | Garbage & Cat Power |
| Alanis Morissette | The Triple Moon Tour | June 27, 2024 | Joan Jett & Morgan Wade |
| The Allman Brothers Band | Shades of Two Worlds Tour | October 26, 1991 | Little Feat |
| The Allman Brothers Band | 1992 Tour | September 6, 1992 | —N/a |
| The Allman Brothers Band | 1993 Tour | July 4, 1993 | Derek Trucks; Warren Haynes Band |
| The Allman Brothers Band | Where It All Begins Tour | July 1, 1994 | Screamin' Cheetah Wheelies; Big Head Todd and the Monsters |
| The Allman Brothers Band | 1995 Tour | July 29, 1995 | Chris Anderson Band & DAG |
| The Allman Brothers Band | 1996 Tour | July 6, 1996 | Edwin McCain Band & Jupiter Coyote |
| The Allman Brothers Band | 1997 Tour | July 3, 1997 | Cry of Love; Mark May and the Agitators |
| The Allman Brothers Band | 1998 Tour | September 12, 1998 | Sister Hazel |
| The Allman Brothers Band | 1999 Tour | September 5, 1999 | Lucinda Williams |
| The Allman Brothers Band | 2000 Tour | September 23, 2000 | Pat McGee Band |
| The Allman Brothers Band | 2001 Tour | August 3, 2001 | Phil Lesh and Friends the Derek Trucks Band |
| The Allman Brothers Band | 2002 Tour | August 24, 2002 | Galactic |
| The Allman Brothers Band | Hittin' the Note Tour | August 10, 2003 | Karl Denson's Tiny Universe |
| The Allman Brothers Band | 2004 Tour | October 1, 2004 | Lynyrd Skynyrd |
| The Allman Brothers Band | 2005 Tour | September 30, 2005 | moe. |
| The Allman Brothers Band | 2006 Tour | August 19, 2006 | The Derek Trucks Band; Oteil and the Peacemakers |
| The Allman Brothers Band | 2007 Tour | August 11, 2007 | Drive-By Truckers; JJ Grey & MOFRO |
| The Allman Brothers Band | 2008 Tour | October 3, 2008 | Phil Lesh and Friends |
| The Allman Brothers Band | 40th Anniversary Tour | October 11, 2009 | Widespread Panic |
| The Allman Brothers Band | 2012 Tour | August 4, 2012 | Lynyrd Skynyrd |
| The Allman Brothers Band | 2013 Tour | August 30, 2013 | Steve Winwood |
| America's Most Wanted Music Festival | — | August 8, 2009 | —N/a |
| America's Most Wanted Music Festival | — | July 27, 2013 | —N/a |
| Angie Stone | Stone Love Tour | September 4, 2005 | KEM |
| Anita Baker | Rhythm of Love World Tour | June 25, 1995 | —N/a |
| Avalon | The Creed Tour | September 12, 2004 | Building 429 |
| The Avett Brothers | I and Love and You Tour | October 8, 2010 | Brandi Carlile |
| Avril Lavigne | Bonez Tour | August 24, 2005 | Gavin DeGraw; Butch Walker |
| B.B. King | Blues Summit Tour | August 19, 1993 | —N/a |
| B.B. King | 1994 Tour | August 27, 1994 | Little Feat |
| B.B. King | Lucille and Friends Tour | September 17, 1995 | —N/a |
| Backstreet Boys | Backstreet's Back Tour | September 5, 1998 | Aaron Carter |
| Backstreet Boys | In a World Like This Tour | August 20, 2013 | Jesse McCartney; DJ Pauly D |
| Backstreet Boys | DNA World Tour | June 25, 2022 | Delta Goodrem |
| Bad Company | Holy Water Tour | August 10, 1991 | Damn Yankees |
| Bad Company and Lynyrd Skynyrd | 40th Anniversaries Tour | July 15, 2014 | The Dead Daisies |
| Barenaked Ladies | Stunt Tour | April 8, 1999 | The Beautiful South |
| Barry Manilow | 1993 Tour | July 29, 1993 | —N/a |
| The Beach Boys | 1991 Tour | July 23, 1991 | The Everly Brothers |
| The Beach Boys | Summer in Paradise Tour | June 17, 1992 | —N/a |
| The Beach Boys | 1994 Tour | June 23, 1994 | —N/a |
| The Beach Boys | Stars and Stripes Vol. 1 Tour | June 13, 1997 | —N/a |
| The Beach Boys | 2000 Tour | July 7, 2000 | Four Tops |
| The Beach Boys | 2007 Tour | August 23, 2007 | Frankie Valli & the Four Seasons |
| Beck & Cage the Elephant | The Night Running Tour | August 24, 2019 | Spoon; Sunflower Bean |
| The Big Shindig Festival | — | May 31, 1998 | —N/a |
| The Big Shindig Festival | — | September 7, 2014 | —N/a |
| The Big Shindig Festival | — | September 13, 2015 | —N/a |
| Big Time Rush | Big Time Summer Tour | August 22, 2012 | Cody Simpson; Rachel Crow |
| Big Time Rush, Victoria Justice | Summer Break Tour | July 7, 2013 | Jackson Guthy |
| The Black Crowes | Three Snakes and One Charm Tour | June 24, 1997 | —N/a |
| The Black Crowes | 2000 Tour | July 4, 2000 | Jimmy Page; Kenny Wayne Shepherd |
| The Black Crowes | 2006 Tour | July 12, 2006 | Drive-By Truckers; Robert Randolph and the Family Band |
| The Black Crowes | Shake Your Money Maker Tour | July 2, 2021 | —N/a |
| The Black Crowes and Lenny Kravitz | By Your Side Tour | May 19, 1999 | —N/a |
| The Black Keys | 2013 Tour | July 11, 2013 | The Flaming Lips |
| Black Sabbath | 1999 Reunion Tour | August 6, 1999 | Widespread Panic |
| Blake Shelton | Barn and Grill Tour | September 17, 2005 | —N/a |
| Blake Shelton | Ten Times Crazier Tour | August 9, 2013 | Easton Corbin; Jana Kramer |
| Blink-182 | Take Off Your Pants and Jacket Tour | July 31, 2001 | New Found Glory; Midtown |
| Blink-182 | Blink-182 Tour | May 14, 2004 | Cypress Hill; Taking Back Sunday; Fall Out Boy |
| Blink-182 | Missionary Impossible | September 3, 2025 | Alkaline Trio; Beauty School Dropout |
| Blink-182 & Green Day | Pop Disaster Tour | May 19, 2002 | Jimmy Eat World |
| Blondie | 2002 Tour | August 8, 2002 | —N/a |
| Blue Man Group | The Complex Tour | August 26, 2003 | Tracy Bonham; Venus Hum |
| Bob Dylan | Never Ending Tour 1993 | September 19, 1993 | Santana |
| Bob Dylan | Never Ending Tour 1999 | July 14, 1999 | Paul Simon |
| Bob Seger & the Silver Bullet Band | Roll Me Away: The Final Tour | May 23, 2019 | Grand Funk Railroad |
| Bon Jovi | I'll Sleep When I'm Dead Tour | July 18, 1993 | Extreme |
| Bon Jovi | These Days Tour | September 15, 1995 | Dokken |
| Bon Jovi | One Wild Night Tour | May 10, 2001 | SR–71 |
| Bonnie Raitt | Silver Lining Tour | July 28, 2002 | Lyle Lovett |
| Boston | Livin' for You Tour | June 21, 1995 | —N/a |
| Boston | 1997 Tour | June 26, 1997 | —N/a |
| Boston | Corporate America Tour | June 28, 2003 | —N/a |
| Boyz II Men | 2024 Tour | September 6, 2024 | Robin Thicke |
| Brad Paisley | Time Well Wasted Tour | June 16, 2006 | Sara Evans; Eric Church |
| Brad Paisley | Bonfires and Amplifiers Tour | July 20, 2007 | Jack Ingram; Kellie Pickler; Taylor Swift |
| Brad Paisley | Paisley Party Tour | July 19, 2008 | Jewel, Chuck Wicks; Julianne Hough |
| Brad Paisley | American Saturday Night Tour | June 6, 2009 | Dierks Bentley and Jimmy Wayne |
| Brad Paisley | H2O Tour | August 28, 2010 | Darius Rucker, Justin Moore, Josh Thompson, Easton Corbin, Steel Magnolia |
| Brad Paisley | H2O II: Wetter and Wilder Tour | September 25, 2011 | Blake Shelton, Jerrod Niemann, Sunny Sweeney, Edens Edge, Brent Anderson |
| Brad Paisley | Virtual Reality World Tour | August 24, 2012 | The Band Perry; Scotty McCreery, Love and Theft, Easton Corbin, Jana Kramer, Kristen Kelly |
| Brad Paisley | Beat This Summer Tour | June 8, 2013 | Chris Young & Lee Brice |
| Brad Paisley | Crushin' It World Tour | May 16, 2015 | Justin Moore & Mickey Guyton |
| Brad Paisley | Life Amplified World Tour | September 18, 2016 | Maddie & Tae & Tyler Farr |
| Brad Paisley | Weekend Warrior Tour | May 20, 2017 | Dustin Lynch, Chase Bryant, Lindsay Ell |
| Brad Paisley | Brad Paisley World Tour | August 15, 2019 | Riley Green & Chris Lane |
| Brad Paisley | Brad Paisley 2021 Tour | August 27, 2021 | Jimmie Allen & Kameron Marlowe |
| Brantley Gilbert | Take It Outside Tour | June 21, 2016 | Justin Moore & Colt Ford |
| Breaking Benjamin | Summer 2019 Tour | August 18, 2019 | Three Days Grace, Dorothy, Chevelle, Diamante |
| Britney Spears | Oops!... I Did It Again Tour | September 12, 2000 | Innosense & BBMak |
| Brooks and Dunn | Tight Rope Tour | October 9, 1999 | Montgomery Gentry |
| Brooks and Dunn | Neon Circus and Wild West Show Tour | June 1, 2001 | Toby Keith, Keith Urban, Montgomery Gentry |
| Brooks and Dunn | Neon Circus and Wild West Show Tour | June 14, 2002 | Gary Allan, Dwight Yoakam, Chris Cagle, Trick Pony |
| Brooks and Dunn | Neon Circus and Wild West Show Tour | June 14, 2003 | Rascal Flatts, Brad Paisley & Cledus T. Judd |
| Brooks and Dunn | Neon Circus and Wild West Show Tour | October 16, 2004 | Montgomery Gentry & Gretchen Wilson |
| Brooks and Dunn | Neon Circus and Wild West Show Tour | August 27, 2005 | Big and Rich, the Warren Brothers; Cowboy Troy |
| Brooks and Dunn | Long Haul Tour | May 13, 2006 | Jack Ingram & Sugarland |
| Brooks and Dunn | 2007 Tour | May 12, 2007 | Alan Jackson, Jake Owen, Catherine Britt |
| Brooks and Dunn | Cowboy Town Tour | September 6, 2008 | ZZ Top & Rodney Atkins |
| Brooks and Dunn | Last Rodeo Tour | June 5, 2010 | Jason Aldean & Tyler Dickerson |
| Bryan Adams | 1993 Tour | May 2, 1993 | —N/a |
| Cage the Elephant | Neon Pill Tour | August 3, 2024 | Bakar, Young the Giant, Vlad Holiday |
| Carnival of Madness | Carnival of Madness Tour | July 25, 2010 | —N/a |
| Carole King | Living Room Tour | July 17, 2005 | Vienna Teng |
| Charlie Daniels Band | Volunteer Jam Tour | May 26, 2001 | .38 Special, Dickey Betts, Great Southern |
| Charlotte Blues Festival | — | September 11, 1992 | —N/a |
| Charlotte Blues Festival | — | September 29, 2001 | —N/a |
| Chicago | Twenty 1 Tour | August 21, 1991 | The Moody Blues |
| Chicago | 2003 Tour | July 11, 2003 | —N/a |
| Chicago | 2004 Tour | July 9, 2004 | Earth, Wind and Fire |
| Chicago | 2005 Tour | July 23, 2005 | —N/a |
| Chicago | Chicago XXX Tour | July 15, 2006 | Huey Lewis and the News |
| Chicago | 2012 Tour | July 26, 2012 | The Doobie Brothers |
| Chicago | 2012 Tour | August 5, 2012 | The Doobie Brothers |
| Chicago | Chicago XXXVI: Now Tour | August 23, 2014 | REO Speedwagon |
| Chicago & the Doobie Brothers | The Tour 2017 | June 25, 2017 | —N/a |
| Chicago & Earth, Wind, & Fire | Heart & Soul Tour 2024 | August 12, 2024 | —N/a |
| The Chicks | DCX MMXVI World Tour | August 12, 2016 | Vintage Trouble & Smooth Hound Smith |
| The Chicks | The Chicks Tour | July 12, 2022 | Patty Griffin |
| Chris Brown | Up Close and Personal Tour | September 3, 2006 | Lil Wayne, Juelz Santana, Dem Franchize Boyz, Ne-Yo |
| Chris Brown | F.A.M.E. Tour | October 1, 2011 | T-Pain, Kelly Rowland, Tyga |
| Chris Brown & Lil Baby | One of Them Ones Tour | July 15, 2022 | Bleu |
| Chris Cagle | My Life's Been a Country Song Tour | May 3, 2008 | Jake Owen |
| Chris Stapleton | All American Roadshow | May 12, 2017 | Brothers Osborne & Lucie Silvas |
| Chris Stapleton | All American Roadshow | August 13, 2021 | Elle King & Nikki Lane |
| Chris Young | Raised On Country Tour | August 23, 2019 | Jimmie Allen & Chris Jansen |
| Coldplay | Twisted Logic Tour | September 10, 2005 | Rilo Kiley |
| Coldplay | Viva la Vida Tour | August 6, 2009 | Elbow & Kitty, Daisy & Lewis |
| Collective Soul | Dosage Tour | June 6, 1999 | Third Eye Blind |
| The Connells | One Simple Word Tour | July 4, 1991 | Widespread Panic |
| Counting Crows | Recovering the Satellites Tour | August 7, 1997 | The Wallflowers & That Dog |
| Counting Crows | Hard Candy Tour | September 1, 2003 | John Mayer |
| Counting Crows | Saturday Nights and Sunday Mornings Tour | July 29, 2008 | Maroon 5 & Sara Bareilles |
| Counting Crows & Rob Thomas | Summer 2016 Tour | July 28, 2016 | K. Phillips |
| Country Throwdown | Country Throwdown Tour | May 28, 2010 | —N/a |
| Creed | Weathered Tour | July 13, 2002 | Course of Nature & 12 Stones |
| Creed | Full Circle Reunion Tour | September 4, 2009 | Staind & Like a Storm |
| Creed | Full Circle Reunion Tour | August 27, 2010 | Skillet |
| Creed | Summer of '99 Tour | September 18, 2024 | 3 Doors Down & Finger Eleven |
| Crosby, Stills and Nash | 2001 Tour | August 30, 2001 | —N/a |
| Crüe Fest 2 | Crüe Fest | August 23, 2009 | —N/a |
| Culture Club | Big Re–Wind Reunion Tour | July 24, 1998 | The Human League; Howard Jones |
| Dan + Shay | The Heartbreak on the Map Tour | August 17, 2024 | Jake Owen & Dylan Marlowe |
| Darius Rucker | Southern Style Tour | August 28, 2015 | Brett Eldredge; A Thousand Horses; Brothers Osborne |
| Darius Rucker | Good for a Good Time Tour | September 10, 2016 | Dan + Shay & Michael Ray |
| Daughtry & Goo Goo Dolls | Daughtry/Goo Goo Dolls Summer Tour | July 8, 2014 | Plain White T's |
| Dave Matthews Band | Under the Table and Dreaming Tour | July 26, 1995 | The Samples & Dionne Farris |
| Dave Matthews Band | Crash Tour | August 30, 1996 | Corey Harris |
| Dave Matthews Band | 1997 Tour | June 20, 1997 | Los Lobos |
| Dave Matthews Band | Before These Crowded Streets Tour | August 29, 1998 | The Getaway People |
| Dave Matthews Band | Before These Crowded Streets Tour | August 30, 1998 | The Getaway People |
| Dave Matthews Band | 1999 Tour | July 31, 1999 | Boy Wonder |
| Dave Matthews Band | 2000 Tour | September 1, 1999 | Taj Mahal & the Phantom Blues Band |
| Dave Matthews Band | Everyday Tour | April 28, 2001 | Terrance Simien and the Zydeco Experience |
| Dave Matthews Band | Everyday Tour | April 29, 2001 | Terrance Simien and the Zydeco Experience |
| Dave Matthews Band | Busted Stuff Tour | July 11, 2002 | North Mississippi Allstars |
| Dave Matthews Band | 2003 Tour | September 17, 2003 | Donavon Frankenreiter Band |
| Dave Matthews Band | 2004 Tour | July 26, 2004 | Robert Earl Keen |
| Dave Matthews Band | Stand Up Tour | June 29, 2005 | Drive-By Truckers |
| Dave Matthews Band | 2006 Tour | June 21, 2006 | Animal Liberation Orchestra |
| Dave Matthews Band | 2007 Tour | September 18, 2007 | Robert Earl Keen |
| Dave Matthews Band | 2008 Tour | July 2, 2008 | Michael Franti and Spearhead |
| Dave Matthews Band | Big Whiskey and the GrooGrux King Tour | April 22, 2009 | The Avett Brothers |
| Dave Matthews Band | Summer Tour 2014 | July 23, 2014 | —N/a |
| Dave Matthews Band | Summer Tour 2015 | May 22, 2015 | Lovely Ladies |
| Dave Matthews Band | Summer Tour 2018 | July 20, 2018 | —N/a |
| Dave Matthews Band | Summer Tour 2021 | July 23, 2021 | —N/a |
| Dave Matthews Band | Summer Tour 2024 | June 14, 2024 | —N/a |
| The Dead | Wave That Flag Tour | August 17, 2004 | Warren Haynes Band |
| Dead & Company | Summer Tour 2018 | June 9, 2018 | —N/a |
| Dead & Company | Fall Tour 2021 | August 16, 2021 | —N/a |
| Dead & Company | The Final Tour: Summer 2023 | June 1, 2023 | —N/a |
| Death Cab for Cutie & The Postal Service | The Postal Service Toyr | April 27, 2024 | Slow Pulp |
| Def Leppard | Seven Day Weekend Tour | September 7, 1993 | —N/a |
| Def Leppard | Slang World Tour | July 26, 1996 | Tripping Daisy |
| Def Leppard | X World Tour | April 18, 2003 | Ricky Warwick |
| Def Leppard | Rock of Ages Tour | October 15, 2005 | Bryan Adams |
| Def Leppard | Yeah! Tour | July 4, 2006 | Journey & Stoll Vaughan |
| Def Leppard | Downstage Thrust Tour | August 27, 2007 | Styx and Foreigner |
| Def Leppard | Songs from the Sparkle Lounge Tour | August 7, 2009 | Poison and Cheap Trick |
| Def Leppard | Mirrorball Tour | June 24, 2011 | Heart |
| Def Leppard | Def Leppard National Tour | August 12, 2016 | REO Speedwagon & Tesla |
| Def Leppard, Poison, Tesla | 2017 North American Tour | April 28, 2017 | —N/a |
| Deftones | White Pony Tour | September 22, 2000 | —N/a |
| Deftones | Back to School Tour | September 7, 2001 | Puddle of Mudd |
| Destiny's Child | Total Request Live Tour | July 21, 2001 | 3LW, Dream, Jessica Simpson, Eve, Nelly and the St. Lunatics. |
| Destiny's Child | Destiny Fulfilled... and Lovin' It Farewell Tour | July 24, 2005 | Mario, Amerie; Tyra Bolling |
| Dierks Bentley | Riser Tour | May 10, 2014 | Chris Young & Chase Rice |
| Dierks Bentley | Sounds of Summer Tour | June 5, 2015 | Kip Moore, Maddie and Tae, Canaan Smith |
| Dierks Bentley | Somewhere on a Beach Tour | July 22, 2016 | Randy Houser, Cam, Tucker Beathard |
| Dierks Bentley | What the Hell World Tour | July 14, 2017 | Cole Swindell & Jon Pardi |
| Dierks Bentley | Mountain High Tour | August 9, 2018 | Brothers Osborne & LANCO |
| Dierks Bentley | Burning Man Tour | July 11, 2019 | Jon Pardi, Tenille Townes, Hot Country Knights |
| Dierks Bentley | Gravel & Gold Tour | June 16, 2023 | Elle King |
| Don Henley | 1991 Tour | July 26, 1991 | Susanna Hoffs |
| The Doobie Brothers | Brotherhood Tour | August 23, 1991 | —N/a |
| The Doobie Brothers | 1995 Tour | August 2, 1995 | —N/a |
| The Doobie Brothers | 1997 Tour | May 23, 1997 | —N/a |
| The Doobie Brothers | 2009 Tour | June 23, 2009 | Bad Company |
| The Doobie Brothers | 50th Anniversary Tour | June 20, 2020 | —N/a |
| The Doobie Brothers | 50th Anniversary Tour | June 13, 2022 | —N/a |
| The Doobie Brothers | The 2024 Tour | July 31, 2024 | Steve Winwood |
| Drake | Club Paradise Tour | May 22, 2012 | J. Cole, Waka Flocka Flame, 2 Chainz, French Montana |
| Duran Duran | Pop Trash Tour | August 2, 2000 | Tsar |
| Eagles | Hell Freezes Over Reunion Tour | August 18, 1994 | —N/a |
| Eagles | Hell Freezes Over Reunion Tour | August 19, 1994 | —N/a |
| Earth, Wind & Fire | Heart and Soul Tour | September 4, 2015 | Chicago |
| Edwin McCain Band | Messenger Tour | May 22, 1999 | —N/a |
| Elton John | The One Tour | August 15, 1992 | —N/a |
| Elton John | Made in England Tour | August 4, 1995 | —N/a |
| Elvis Costello & the Attractions | Brutal Youth Tour | June 18, 1994 | Crash Test Dummies |
| Enrique Iglesias | Enrique World Tour | September 21, 2001 | —N/a |
| Enrique Iglesias | One Night Stand Tour | September 21, 2002 | Paulina Rubio |
| Evanescence | Synthesis Tour | July 21, 2018 | Lindsey Stirling |
| Fall Out Boy & Paramore | Monumentour | July 22, 2014 | New Politics |
| Fall Out Boy & Wiz Khalifa | The Boys of Zummer Tour | July 18, 2015 | Hoodie Allen |
| Farm Aid | — | September 13, 2014 | —N/a |
| Fleetwood Mac | Time Tour | August 11, 1995 | —N/a |
| Fleetwood Mac | Say You Will Tour | May 22, 2004 | —N/a |
| Florence + the Machine Tour | High as Hope Tour | July 5, 2019 | Grace VanderWaal |
| Florida Georgia Line | Anything Goes Tour | August 13, 2015 | Thomas Rhett & Frankie Ballard |
| Florida Georgia Line | Dig Your Roots Tour | July 14, 2016 | Cole Swindell, the Cadillac Three, Kane Brown |
| Florida Georgia Line | Smooth Tour | July 21, 2017 | Nelly, Chris Lane, & Morgan Wallen |
| Florida Georgia Line | Can't Say I Ain't Country Tour | July 26, 2019 | Dan + Shay, Morgen Wallen, Hardy |
| Fono | Too Broken to Break Tour | August 28, 2007 | —N/a |
| Foo Fighters | Everything or Nothing at All Tour | May 7, 2024 | Nova Twins |
| Foreigner | 40th Anniversary Tour | August 6, 2017 | Cheap Trick & Jason Bonham's Led Zeppelin Experience |
| Foreigner | Juke Box Heroes Tour | August 28, 2020 | Europe & Kansas |
| Furthur Festival | — | June 23, 1996 | —N/a |
| Furthur Festival | — | June 24, 1997 | —N/a |
| Furthur Festival | — | July 25, 2002 | —N/a |
| Future | Nobody Safe Tour | May 13, 2017 | A$AP Ferg, Migos, Tory Lanez |
| Future | Legendary Nights Tour | September 19, 2019 | Meek Mill |
| George Strait | Troubadour Tour | May 16, 2009 | Blake Shelton & Julianne Hough |
| Gin Blossoms | 1994 Tour | September 24, 1994 | —N/a |
| Gipsy Kings | 1999 Tour | August 22, 1999 | —N/a |
| Glass Animals | Tour of Earth | August 16, 2024 | Kevin Abstract |
| Glenn Frey | Strange Weather Tour | May 30, 1993 | Joe Walsh |
| Goo Goo Dolls | 1999 Tour | September 10, 1999 | Sugar Ray & Fastball |
| Goo Goo Dolls | Gutterflower Tour | August 28, 2002 | Third Eye Blind & Vanessa Carlton |
| Goo Goo Dolls | 20th Anniversary Tour | August 23, 2006 | Counting Crows & Eliot Morris |
| Goo Goo Dolls | 2007 Tour | July 15, 2007 | Lifehouse & Colbie Caillat |
| Green Day | Revolution Radio Tour | September 1, 2017 | Catfish and the Bottlemen |
| Gwen Stefani | The Sweet Escape Tour | May 14, 2007 | Akon & Lady Sovereign |
| Gwen Stefani | This Is What the Truth Feels Like Tour | July 24, 2016 | Eve |
| Halestorm & I Prevail | Summer 2024 North American Tour | July 9, 2024 | Fit for a King & Hollywood Undead |
| Hall and Oates | 2004 Tour | June 30, 2004 | Michael McDonald & Average White Band |
| Hall and Oates | 2014 Tour | May 3, 2014 | Robert Randolph and the Family Band |
| Halsey | For My Last Trick: The Tour | May 29, 2025 | Alvvays & Hope Tala |
| Hank Williams Jr. | Stormy Tour | May 1, 1999 | Charlie Daniels Band |
| Hank Williams Jr. | Stormy Tour | June 24, 2000 | Charlie Daniels Band |
| Hank Williams Jr. | The Almeria Club Recordings Tour | July 20, 2002 | —N/a |
| Hank Williams Jr. | Live in Concert | May 17, 2024 | Old Crow Medicine Show |
| Hank Williams Jr. & Lynyrd Skynyrd | – | August 12, 2017 | Aaron Lewis |
| Hardy | Quit Tour | June 15, 2024 | —N/a |
| Heart | Heartbreaker Tour | June 22, 2013 | Jason Bonham's Led Zeppelin Experience |
| Heart, Joan Jett & the Blackhearts, Cheap Trick | Rock Hall Three For All | September 14, 2016 | —N/a |
| Heart, Joan Jett & the Blackhearts, Cheap Trick | Love Alive Tour | August 10, 2019 | Elle King |
| Hinder | 2008 Tour | September 16, 2008 | 3 Doors Down, Finger Eleven, American Bang |
| Honda Civic Tour | 12th Annual Honda Civic Tour; Maroon 5 & Kelly Clarkson | September 10, 2013 | Tony Lucca |
| H.O.R.D.E. Festival | — | August 12, 1993 | —N/a |
| H.O.R.D.E. Festival | — | August 26, 1995 | —N/a |
| H.O.R.D.E. Festival | — | August 27, 1996 | —N/a |
| H.O.R.D.E. Festival | — | August 12, 1998 | —N/a |
| Hootie and the Blowfish | Cracked Rear View Tour | August 31, 1995 | Dillon Fence |
| Hootie and the Blowfish | Looking for Lucky Tour | August 20, 2006 | Better Than Ezra |
| Hootie and the Blowfish | Group Therapy Tour | May 31, 2019 | Barenaked Ladies |
| Hootie and the Blowfish | Summer Camp with Trucks Tour | September 13, 2024 | Edwin McCain & Collective Soul |
| House Party Jam | — | September 7, 2003 | —N/a |
| Hozier | Unreal Unearth Tour | April 20, 2024 | Allison Russell |
| Incubus | A Crow Left of the Murder... Tour | October 6, 2004 | Ben Kweller & Parmalee |
| Indigo Girls | Come On Now Social Tour | September 26, 1999 | —N/a |
| Indigo Girls | 2000 Tour | June 4, 2000 | Michael Franti & Spearhead |
| The Interrupters | Fight the Good Fight Tour | July 28, 2019 | 311, Dirty Heads, Dreamers |
| Iron Maiden | Maiden England World Tour | September 3, 2013 | Megadeth |
| Jack Johnson | Sleep Through the Static Tour | August 12, 2008 | Neil Halstead & Rogue Wave |
| Jack Johnson | World Tour 2010 | August 21, 2010 | G. Love and Special SauceAnimal Liberation Orchestra |
| Jackson Browne | 1999 Tour | September 4, 1999 | Bonnie Raitt |
| Jagged Edge | Hard Tour | May 8, 2004 | Ginuwine |
| James Taylor | 2001 Tour | June 9, 2001 | —N/a |
| James Taylor | 2005 Tour | July 29, 2005 | Kyler England |
| James Taylor | 2008 Tour | May 28, 2008 | —N/a |
| James Taylor | 2014 Tour | August 2, 2014 | —N/a |
| Jane's Addiction | Jubilee Tour | October 13, 2001 | —N/a |
| Jane's Addiction | Strays Tour | August 2, 2003 | —N/a |
| Janet Jackson | Janet World Tour | July 29, 1994 | —N/a |
| Janet Jackson | The Velvet Rope Tour | October 20, 1998 | *NSYNC |
| Janet Jackson | Unbreakable World Tour | September 17, 2015 | —N/a |
| Janet Jackson | State of the World Tour | August 1, 2018 | —N/a |
| Janet Jackson | Together Again Tour | May 12, 2023 | Ludacris |
| Jars of Clay | 1999 Tour | September 12, 1999 | —N/a |
| Jars of Clay | Music Builds Tour | September 19, 2008 | Third Day, Switchfoot, Robert Randolph and the Family Band |
| Jason Aldean | My Kinda Party Tour | September 10, 2011 | Chris Young & Thompson Square |
| Jason Aldean | My Kinda Party Tour | July 27, 2012 | Luke Bryan & Rachel Farley |
| Jason Aldean | Night Train Tour | September 13, 2013 | Jake Owen & Thomas Rhett |
| Jason Aldean | Burn It Down Tour | September 6, 2014 | Florida Georgia Line & Tyler Farr |
| Jason Aldean | Burn It Down Tour | September 5, 2015 | Cole Swindell & Tyler Farr |
| Jason Aldean | Back in the Saddle Tour | August 19, 2021 | Hardy & Dee Jay Silver |
| Jason Mraz | Tour Is a Four Letter Word Tour | August 19, 2012 | Christina Perri |
| JazzFest | — | August 25, 2000 | —N/a |
| Jessica Simpson | Reality Tour | June 20, 2004 | Ryan Cabrera |
| Jesus Jones | Doubt Tour | October 3, 1991 | Ned's Atomic Dustbin |
| Jethro Tull | 25th Anniversary Tour | August 24, 1993 | —N/a |
| Jethro Tull | 1998 Tour | October 2, 1998 | Gov't Mule |
| Jethro Tull | J-Tull Dot Com Tour | July 1, 2000 | The Chieftains |
| Jill Scott | Summer Block Party Tour | August 23, 2011 | Mint Condition, Anthony Hamilton, DJ Jazzy Jeff |
| Jimmy Buffett | Outposts Tour | August 19, 1991 | Greg "Fingers" Taylor & the Ladyfingers Revue |
| Jimmy Buffett | Outposts Tour | August 20, 1991 | Greg "Fingers" Taylor & the Ladyfingers Revue |
| Jimmy Buffett | Recession Recess Tour | June 13, 1992 | Evangeline |
| Jimmy Buffett | Recession Recess Tour | June 14, 1992 | Evangeline |
| Jimmy Buffett | Chameleon Caravan Tour | August 13, 1993 | The Iguanas |
| Jimmy Buffett | Chameleon Caravan Tour | August 14, 1993 | The Iguanas |
| Jimmy Buffett | Chameleon Caravan Tour | August 16, 1993 | The Iguanas |
| Jimmy Buffett | Fruitcakes Tour | June 3, 1994 | —N/a |
| Jimmy Buffett | Fruitcakes Tour | June 4, 1995 | —N/a |
| Jimmy Buffett | Fruitcakes Tour | June 5, 1994 | —N/a |
| Jimmy Buffett | Domino College Tour | May 31, 1995 | —N/a |
| Jimmy Buffett | Domino College Tour | June 2, 1995 | —N/a |
| Jimmy Buffett | Domino College Tour | June 3, 1995 | —N/a |
| Jimmy Buffett | Banana Wind Tour | August 6, 1996 | —N/a |
| Jimmy Buffett | Banana Wind Tour | August 7, 1996 | —N/a |
| Jimmy Buffett | Havana Daydreamin' Tour | June 16, 1997 | —N/a |
| Jimmy Buffett | Havana Daydreamin' Tour | June 17, 1997 | —N/a |
| Jimmy Buffett | Don't Stop the Carnival Tour | July 4, 1998 | —N/a |
| Jimmy Buffett | Beach House on the Moon Tour | June 15, 1999 | —N/a |
| Jimmy Buffett | Tuesdays, Thursdays and Saturdays Tour | August 22, 2000 | —N/a |
| Jimmy Buffett | Far Side of the World Tour | April 16, 2002 | —N/a |
| Jimmy Buffett | Year of Still Here Tour | June 7, 2008 | Jake Shimabukuro |
| Jimmy Buffett | Summerzcool Tour | April 23, 2009 | —N/a |
| Jimmy Buffett | Welcome to Fin Land Tour | April 19, 2011 | —N/a |
| Jimmy Buffett | Songs from St. Somewhere Tour | April 22, 2014 | —N/a |
| Jimmy Buffett | Workin' N' Playin' Tour | April 21, 2016 | Huey Lewis and the News |
| Jimmy Buffett | Son of a Son of a Sailor Tour | April 27, 2018 | —N/a |
| Jimmy Buffett | Life on the Flip Side Tour | April 23, 2022 | —N/a |
| John Denver | Different Directions Tour | August 21, 1992 | —N/a |
| John Fogerty | Premonition Tour | July 21, 1998 | Sister 7 |
| John Fogerty | 2006 Tour | July 29, 2006 | Willie Nelson |
| John Mayer | Continuum Tour | July 31, 2007 | Ben Folds & the Suburbs |
| John Mayer | Continuum Tour | August 27, 2008 | OneRepublic & Paramore |
| John Mayer | Battle Studies World Tour | July 17, 2010 | Train |
| John Mayer | Born and Raised World Tour | September 5, 2013 | Phillip Phillips |
| John Mayer | The Search for Everything Tour | August 16, 2017 | The Night Game |
| John Mayer Trio | 2004 Tour | August 24, 2004 | Maroon 5 & DJ Logic |
| John Mellencamp | Rural Electrification Tour | July 7, 1999 | Son Volt |
| John Mellencamp | 2005 Tour | July 22, 2005 | John Fogerty & Stoll Vaughan |
| Jonas Brothers | Burnin' Up Tour | July 30, 2008 | Demi Lovato |
| Journey | Trial By Fire Reunion Tour | June 23, 1999 | Foreigner |
| Journey | Arrival Tour | June 26, 2001 | Peter Frampton & John Waite |
| Journey | Revelation Tour | August 10, 2008 | Cheap Trick & Heart |
| Journey | Eclipse Tour | August 20, 2011 | Foreigner & Night Ranger |
| Journey & Steve Miller Band | Eclipse Tour | May 29, 2014 | —N/a |
| Journey | Eclipse Tour | June 5, 2016 | Dave Mason |
| Journey | Eclipse Tour | July 25, 2017 | Asia |
| Judas Priest | Operation Rock 'n' Roll Tour | July 31, 1991 | Alice Cooper |
| Kansas | 1993 Tour | May 31, 1993 | —N/a |
| Kansas | 2003 Tour | September 26, 2003 | —N/a |
| Kanye West | Glow in the Dark Tour | May 9, 2008 | Rihanna, Lupe Fiasco, N.E.R.D, DJ Craze |
| KC's Boogie Blast | — | July 28, 2006 | —N/a |
| Keith Urban | Light the Fuse Tour | July 26, 2013 | Little Big Town & Dustin Lynch |
| Keith Urban | Raise 'Em Up Tour | August 8, 2014 | Jerrod Niemann & Brett Eldredge |
| Keith Urban | ripCORD World Tour | August 19, 2016 | Brett Eldredge & Maren Morris |
| Keith Urban | High and Alive World Tour | May 31, 2025 | Alana Springsteen, Chase Matthew, Karley Scott Collins |
| Kelly Clarkson | Addicted Tour | July 3, 2006 | Rooney |
| Kenny Chesney | Greatest Hits Tour | August 10, 2001 | Lee Ann Womack |
| Kenny Chesney | No Shoes, No Shirt, No Problems Tour | May 11, 2002 | Montgomery Gentry, Jamie O'Neal, Phil Vassar |
| Kenny Chesney | Margaritas N' Senorita's Tour | May 10, 2003 | Keith Urban & Chely Wright |
| Kenny Chesney | Guitars, Tiki-Bars and A Whole Lotta Love Tour | July 17, 2004 | Rascal Flatts & Uncle Kracker |
| Kenny Chesney | Guitars, Tiki-Bars and A Whole Lotta Love Tour | July 18, 2004 | Rascal Flatts & Uncle Kracker |
| Kenny Chesney | Somewhere in the Sun Tour | August 12, 2005 | Pat Green & Gretchen Wilson |
| Kenny Chesney | Somewhere in the Sun Tour | August 13, 2005 | Pat Green & Gretchen Wilson |
| Kenny Chesney | The Road and the Radio Tour | August 11, 2006 | Dierks Bentley & Jake Owen |
| Kenny Chesney | The Road and the Radio Tour | August 12, 2006 | Dierks Bentley & Jake Owen |
| Kenny Chesney | Flip-Flop Summer Tour | August 3, 2007 | Pat Green & Sugarland |
| Kenny Chesney | Flip-Flop Summer Tour | August 4, 2007 | Pat Green & Sugarland |
| Kenny Chesney | The Poets and Pirates Tour | August 22, 2008 | LeAnn Rimes, Gary Allan, Luke Bryan |
| Kenny Chesney | The Poets and Pirates Tour | August 23, 2008 | LeAnn Rimes, Gary Allan, Luke Bryan |
| Kenny Chesney | Sun City Carnival Tour | August 30, 2009 | Miranda Lambert & Lady Antebellum |
| Kenny Chesney | Goin' Coastal Tour | August 5, 2011 | Uncle Kracker & Billy Currington |
| Kenny Chesney | No Shoes Nation Tour | May 23, 2013 | Eli Young Band & Kacey Musgraves |
| Kenny Chesney | Spread the Love Tour | May 21, 2016 | Old Dominion |
| Kenny Chesney | Trip Around the Sun Tour | May 12, 2018 | Old Dominion |
| Kesha & Scissor Sisters | The Tits Out Tour | August 24, 2025 | Rose Gray |
| Kid Rock | Rock 'n' Rebels II Tour | July 24, 2009 | Lynyrd Skynyrd & Black Stone Cherry |
| Kid Rock | Born Free Pt 2 Tour | August 25, 2011 | Sheryl Crow |
| Kid Rock | First Kiss Cheap Date Tour | July 11, 2015 | Foreigner |
| Kid Rock | Bad Reputation Tour | June 18, 2022 | Grand Funk Railroad |
| Kidz Bop | Never Stop Tour | June 30, 2023 | —N/a |
| Kidz Bop | Live 2024 | October 10, 2024 | —N/a |
| Kings of Leon | Come Around Sundown World Tour | September 13, 2010 | The Black Keys & the Whigs |
| Kings of Leon | Mechanical Bull Tour | September 17, 2014 | Young the Giant & Kongos |
| Kings of Leon | WALLS Tour | May 17, 2017 | Deerhunter |
| Kings of Leon | When You See Yourself Tour | August 8, 2021 | Cold War Kids |
| Kiss | The Farewell Tour | June 30, 2000 | Ted Nugent & Skid Row |
| Kiss | Rock the Nation Tour | July 27, 2004 | Poison and ZO2 |
| Kiss | The Hottest Show on Earth Tour | August 29, 2010 | The Academy Is... |
| Kiss | End of the Road World Tour | May 17, 2022 | David Garibaldi |
| Kiss and Mötley Crüe | The Tour | July 22, 2012 | The Treatment |
| Kiss and Def Leppard | 40th Anniversary Tour/Heroes Tour | July 20, 2014 | Kobra and the Lotus |
| Kool & the Gang | Keepin' the Funk Alive Tour | July 23, 2016 | Bootsy Collins, Morris Day, Big Daddy Kane |
| KoЯn | Untouchables Tour | October 18, 2002 | Disturbed, Trust Company; Marz |
| Lady A | Own the Night Tour | June 8, 2012 | Darius Rucker & Thompson Square |
| Lady A | Take Me Downtown Tour | April 25, 2014 | Billy Currington & Kacey Musgraves |
| Lady A | Wheels Up Tour | August 8, 2015 | Hunter Hayes, Sam Hunt, Gloriana |
| Lady A | You Look Good Tour | June 16, 2017 | Kelsea Ballerini & Brett Young |
| Lady A & Darius Rucker | Summer Plays On Tour | October 4, 2018 | Russell Dickerson |
| Lauryn Hill | Miseducation Tour | August 5, 1999 | The Roots |
| Lil Wayne | 500 Degreez Tour | October 11, 2002 | —N/a |
| Lil Wayne | I Am Music II Tour | July 29, 2011 | Keri Hilson, Rick Ross, Porcelain Black, Lloyd, Far East Movement |
| Lilith Fair | — | July 30, 1997 | —N/a |
| Lilith Fair | — | July 22, 1998 | —N/a |
| Lionel Richie | All the Hits All Night Long Tour | July 19, 2014 | CeeLo Green & the Board Memberz |
| Little Feat | Shake Me Up Tour | July 29, 1992 | —N/a |
| Little Feat | Ain't Had Enough Fun Tour | May 27, 1995 | —N/a |
| Little River Band | 2000 Tour | July 23, 2000 | —N/a |
| Live | Throwing Copper Tour | July 25, 1995 | Buffalo Tom |
| Live | Secret Samadhi Tour | October 4, 1997 | Luscious Jackson |
| Live | The Distance to Here Tour | October 17, 2000 | Counting Crows & Bettie Serveert |
| Lollapalooza | — | August 17, 1991 | —N/a |
| Lollapalooza | — | August 18, 1992 | —N/a |
| Lollapalooza | — | July 23, 1993 | —N/a |
| Lollapalooza | — | August 10, 1994 | —N/a |
| Lollapalooza | — | August 6, 1995 | —N/a |
| Lollapalooza | — | June 29, 1997 | —N/a |
| Lou Christie | 2001 Tour | August 24, 2001 | —N/a |
| Luke Bryan | Dirt Road Diaries Tour | July 13, 2013 | Thompson Square & Florida Georgia Line |
| Luke Bryan | That's My Kind of Night Tour | June 7, 2014 | Lee Brice & Cole Swindell |
| Luke Bryan | That's My Kind of Night Tour | June 8, 2014 | Lee Brice & Kelleigh Bannen |
| Luke Bryan | Kick the Dust Up Tour | September 25, 2015 | Randy Houser & Dustin Lynch |
| Luke Bryan | Kick the Dust Up Tour | September 26, 2015 | Randy Houser & Dustin Lynch |
| Luke Bryan | Kill the Lights Tour | September 2, 2016 | Little Big Town & Dustin Lynch |
| Luke Bryan | Kill the Lights Tour | September 3, 2016 | Little Big Town & Dustin Lynch |
| Luke Bryan | Huntin', Fishin' and Lovin' Every Day Tour | August 19, 2017 | Brett Eldredge & Craig Campbell |
| Luke Bryan | Sunset Repeat Tour | October 12, 2019 | Cole Swindell, John Langston, DJ Rock |
| Luke Bryan | Proud to Be Right Here Tour | July 24, 2021 | Dylan Scott, Caylee Hammack, DJ Rock |
| Luke Bryan | Raised Up Right Tour | July 8, 2022 | Riley Green, Mitchell Tenpenny, DJ Rock |
| Luke Bryan | Mind of a Country Boy Tour | October 26, 2023 | Chayce Beckham, Ashley Cooke, Hailey Whitters, DJ Rock |
| The Lumineers | III: The World Tour | June 2, 2020 | CAAMP & Jade Bird |
| The Lumineers | Brightside Tour | May 24, 2022 | Caamp |
| Luther Vandross | The BK Got Soul Tour | August 30, 2002 | Gerald Levert, Angie Stone, Michelle Williams |
| Lynyrd Skynyrd | Edge of Forever Tour | September 12, 2001 | Little Feat |
| Lynyrd Skynyrd | 2006 Tour | July 18, 2006 | 3 Doors Down and Shooter Jennings |
| Lynyrd Skynyrd | Gods and Guns Tour | June 18, 2010 | .38 Special & Bret Michaels |
| Lynyrd Skynyrd & ZZ Top | Sharp Dressed Simple Man Tour | September 15, 2023 | Uncle Kracker |
| Maggie Rogers | Don't Forget Me Tour | June 19, 2024 | The Japanese House |
| Martina McBride | The Waking Up Laughing Tour | October 4, 2008 | Jack Ingram & Jason Michael Carroll |
| Mary J. Blige | The Mary Show Tour | July 8, 2000 | Carl Thomas & Jagged Edge |
| Mary J. Blige | No More Drama Tour | July 14, 2002 | Tweet |
| Mary J. Blige | The Breakthrough Experience Tour | August 5, 2006 | LeToya Luckett |
| Mary J. Blige | Love Soul Tour | September 21, 2008 | Robin Thicke |
| Mary J. Blige & Nas | The Royalty Tour | July 25, 2019 | —N/a |
| Matchbox 20 | 1998 Tour | September 30, 1998 | Paula Cole |
| Matchbox 20 | More Than You Think You Are Tour | July 5, 2003 | Sugar Ray & American Hi-Fi |
| Matchbox 20 | Matchbox Twenty 2020 Tour | August 1, 2020 | The Wallflowers |
| Matchbox 20 | Slow Dream Tour | July 12, 2023 | Matt Nathanson |
| Matchbox 20 & Counting Crows | Brief History of Everything Tour | August 22, 2017 | Rivers & Rust Tour |
| Matchbox 20 & Goo Goo Dolls | 2013 Summer Tour | August 7, 2013 | Kate Earl |
| Mayhem Festival | — | August 3, 2010 | —N/a |
| Mayhem Festival | — | August 3, 2011 | —N/a |
| Maze | 2003 Tour | June 29, 2003 | Anita Baker |
| Maze | 2004 Tour | June 25, 2004 | Gerald Levert |
| Megadeath | Destroy All Enemies Tour | September 7, 2024 | All That Remains & Mudvayne |
| Melissa Etheridge | Breakdown Tour | May 20, 2000 | Vertical Horizon |
| Melissa Etheridge | Lucky Tour | June 4, 2004 | —N/a |
| Metallica | Wherever We May Roam Tour | June 25, 1992 | Metal Church |
| Michael W. Smith | 2002 Tour | September 8, 2002 | Third Day |
| Michael W. Smith | 2004 Tour | July 16, 2004 | David Crowder Band & MercyMe |
| Michael W. Smith | Healing Rain Tour | Jars of Clay & Building 429 | |
| Miranda Lambert and Dierks Bentley | Locked and Reloaded Tour | August 24, 2013 | Randy Rogers Band & Gwen Sebastian |
| Miranda Lambert | Platinum Tour | August 21, 2014 | Justin Moore & Thomas Rhett |
| Miranda Lambert | Keeper of the Flame Tour | June 10, 2016 | Kip Moore & Brothers Osborne |
| The Monkees | 30th Anniversary Tour | August 10, 1996 | —N/a |
| The Moody Blues | 1993 Tour | June 18, 1993 | —N/a |
| The Moody Blues | 1994 Tour | July 8, 1994 | —N/a |
| The Moody Blues | 1997 Tour | June 6, 1997 | —N/a |
| The Moody Blues | Strange Times Tour | September 11, 1999 | —N/a |
| Morgan Wallen | The Dangerous Tour | June 3, 2022 | Hardy |
| Mötley Crüe | Anywhere There's Electricity Tour | July 2, 1994 | King's X |
| Mötley Crüe | Maximum Rock Tour | September 3, 1999 | Scorpions |
| Mötley Crüe | Maximum Rock Tour | July 26, 2000 | Megadeth |
| MTV Total Request Live | MTV Total Request Live Tour | July 21, 2001 | —N/a |
| Mumford and Sons | 2015 Tour | June 11, 2015 | The Maccabees |
| My Morning Jacket | Eye to Eye Tour | September 28, 2024 | Nathan Rateliff & the Nightsweats |
| *NSYNC | Boys of Summer Tour | August 29, 1999 | Jordan Knight & 3rd Storee |
| NC AG JAM | — | September 13, 2008 | —N/a |
| NC AG JAM | — | September 12, 2009 | —N/a |
| Needtobreathe | Caves Tour | April 26, 2024 | Judah & the Lion |
| Neil Young | Harvest Moon Tour | August 28, 1993 | Booker T. and the M.G.'s |
| Neil Young and Crazy Horse | Broken Arrow Tour | August 12, 1996 | —N/a |
| Neil Young & the Friends and Relatives | Silver and Gold Tour | August 23, 2000 | Tegan and Sara |
| Nelly | Nellyville Tour | October 11, 2002 | Cash Money Millionaires |
| Nelly, TLC, Flo Rida | Whole Lotta Hits Tour | July 27, 2019 | —N/a |
| New Edition | One Love Tour | May 22, 2005 | Gerald Levert & Brian McKnight |
| New Kids on the Block | The Magic Summer Tour (2024) | July 28, 2024 | Paula Abdul & DJ Jazzy Jeff |
| Niall Horan | The Show: Live on Tour | June 7, 2024 | Del Water Gap |
| Nickelback | The Long Road Tour | July 23, 2004 | Puddle of Mudd, 3 Doors Down, 12 Stones |
| Nickelback | All the Right Reasons Tour | August 26, 2007 | Puddle of Mudd & Finger Eleven |
| Nickelback | Dark Horse Tour | August 1, 2009 | Hinder, Papa Roach & Saving Abel |
| Nine Inch Nails and David Bowie | Dissonance/Outside Tour | October 7, 1995 | Prick |
| Nine Inch Nails | Fragility Tour | May 13, 2000 | A Perfect Circle |
| Nine Inch Nails | Live: With Teeth Tour | June 9, 2006 | TV on the Radio & Bauhaus |
| No Doubt | 2009 Summer Tour | June 8, 2009 | Paramore and the Sounds |
| O.A.R. | 2007 Tour | July 22, 2007 | Augustana |
| OneRepublic | Native Summer Tour | August 13, 2014 | The Script & American Authors |
| OUTCRY | Outcry Tour 2016 | April 22, 2016 | —N/a |
| Outlaw Music Fest | – | September 15, 2019 | —N/a |
| Ozzfest | — | August 1, 1998 | —N/a |
| Ozzfest | — | July 24, 2002 | —N/a |
| Ozzfest | — | August 31, 2004 | —N/a |
| Ozzfest | — | August 9, 2006 | —N/a |
| Patti LaBelle | Sister Soulfest Tour | July 11, 1999 | Chaka Khan |
| Paul van Dyk | 2009 Tour | October 6, 2009 | —N/a |
| Pearl Jam | Yield Tour | August 31, 1998 | Mudhoney |
| Pearl Jam | Riot Act Tour | April 15, 2003 | Sleater-Kinney |
| Phil Collins | Both Sides of the World Tour | June 7, 1994 | —N/a |
| Phil Lesh and Friends | 2006 Tour | June 28, 2006 | Benevento/Russo Duo & Trey Anastasio Band |
| Phish | Hoist Tour | June 29, 1994 | —N/a |
| Phish | 1995 Tour | June 16, 1995 | —N/a |
| Phish | Billy Breathes Tour | July 22, 1997 | —N/a |
| Phish | The Story of the Ghost Tour | August 7, 1998 | —N/a |
| Phish | Farmhouse Tour | June 25, 2000 | —N/a |
| Phish | Round Room Tour | July 27, 2003 | —N/a |
| Phish | Joy Tour | July 1, 2010 | —N/a |
| Phish | Joy Tour | June 18, 2011 | —N/a |
| Phish | 2015 Tour | August 14, 2015 | —N/a |
| Pitbull | Can't Stop Us Now Tour | July 28, 2022 | Iggy Azalea |
| Pitbull | I'm Back Tour | May 19, 2026 | Lil Jon |
| Poison | Native Tongue Tour | June 20, 1993 | Damn Yankees |
| Poison | Power to the People Tour | July 12, 2000 | Dokken, Cinderella, Slaughter |
| Poison | Glam, Slam, Metal Jam Tour | June 6, 2001 | Warrant, Quiet Riot, Enuff Z'nuff |
| Poison | 20th Anniversary Tour | August 15, 2006 | Cinderella & Endeverafter |
| Post Malone | Beerbongs & Bentleys Tour | May 18, 2018 | 21 Savage & SOB X RBE |
| Post Malone | F-1 Trillion Tour | October 5, 2024 | Muscadine Bloodline & Dan Spencer |
| The Postal Service | 2013 Reunion Tour | June 7, 2013 | Ra Ra Riot |
| The Pretenders | Last of the Independents Tour | July 3, 1998 | The B-52's |
| Pride & Glory | Pride & Glory Tour | August 21, 1994 | —N/a |
| Prince & the New Power Generation | Jam of the Year Tour | August 18, 1997 | —N/a |
| Projekt Revolution | — | August 13, 2007 | —N/a |
| Projekt Revolution | — | July 25, 2008 | —N/a |
| Queensrÿche | Road to the Promised Land Tour | June 30, 1995 | Type O Negative |
| Queensrÿche | Hear in the Now Frontier Tour | August 6, 1997 | —N/a |
| R.E.M. | Up Tour | August 27, 1999 | Wilco |
| R.E.M. | 2003 Tour | October 10, 2003 | Pete Yorn |
| R.E.M. | Accelerate Tour | June 10, 2008 | Modest Mouse & the National |
| Randy Travis | 1999 Tour | May 15, 1999 | —N/a |
| Rascal Flatts | Here's to You Tour | September 15, 2005 | Gary Allan, Keith Anderson, Blake Shelton |
| Rascal Flatts | Me and My Gang Tour | September 16, 2006 | Blake Shelton, Eric Church, Katrina Elam |
| Rascal Flatts | Still Feels Good Tour | August 19, 2007 | Jason Aldean |
| Rascal Flatts | Bob That Head Tour | August 2, 2008 | Wendell Mobley, Neil Thrasher, Taylor Swift |
| Rascal Flatts | American Living Unstoppable Tour | August 2, 2009 | Darius Rucker & Cledus T. Judd |
| Rascal Flatts | Nothing Like This Tour | June 25, 2010 | Kellie Pickler & Chris Young |
| Rascal Flatts | Flatts Fest Tour | July 30, 2011 | Sara Evans, Justin Moore, Easton Corbin |
| Rascal Flatts | Changed Tour | August 10, 2012 | Little Big Town, Eli Young Band, Edens Edge |
| Rascal Flatts | Live and Loud Tour | September 27, 2013 | The Band Perry & Cassadee Pope |
| Rascal Flatts | Rewind Tour | July 25, 2014 | Sheryl Crow & Gloriana |
| Rascal Flatts | Riot Tour | July 26, 2015 | Scotty McCreery & RaeLynn |
| Rascal Flatts | Rhythm and Roots Tour | June 18, 2016 | Kelsea Ballerini & Chris Lane |
| Rascal Flatts | Back to Us Tour | June 16, 2018 | Dan + Shay & Carly Pearce |
| Rascal Flatts | Summer Playlist Tour | June 28, 2019 | Billy Currington & LoCash |
| Reba McEntire & Brad Paisley | 2 Hats and A Redhead Tour | April 17, 2005 | Terri Clark |
| Red Hot Chili Peppers | Blood Sugar Sex Magik Tour | August 18, 1992 | Ministry & Lukin |
| Red Hot Chili Peppers | Californication Tour | June 11, 2000 | Foo Fighters & Kool Keith |
| Red Hot Chili Peppers | By the Way World Tour | June 5, 2003 | The Mars Volta & Snoop Dogg |
| Red Hot Chili Peppers | Unlimited Love Tour | June 26, 2024 | Ice Cube |
| Rock Never Stops | Rock Never Stops Tour | August 14, 1999 | —N/a |
| Rod Stewart | 2001 Tour | July 7, 2001 | —N/a |
| Rod Stewart | As Time Goes By Tour | July 7, 2004 | —N/a |
| Rod Stewart | 2020 Tour | August 21, 2020 | Cheap Trick |
| Rüfüs Du Sol | Inhale / Exhale Tour | May 9, 2025 | Neil Francis |
| Rush | Vapor Trails Tour | July 4, 2002 | —N/a |
| Rush | Snakes & Arrows Tour | June 20, 2007 | —N/a |
| Rusted Root | Rusted Root Tour | August 21, 1999 | Jewel & Steve Poltz |
| Sade | Lovers Rock Tour | August 25, 2001 | India.Arie |
| Sam Hunt | 15 in a 30 Tour | July 28, 2017 | Maren Morris, Chris Janson, Ryan Follese |
| Sam Hunt | Locked Up Tour | July 27, 2024 | Russell Dickerson & George Birge |
| Sammy Hagar and the Waboritas | Heavyweight Champs of Rock 'n' Roll Tour | August 6, 2002 | David Lee Roth |
| Santana | Milagro Tour | October 24, 1992 | —N/a |
| Santana | Dance of the Rainbow Serpent Tour | October 4, 1995 | Jeff Beck |
| Santana | Supernatural Tour | July 25, 2000 | Macy Gray |
| Santana | Shaman Tour | June 13, 2003 | Angélique Kidjo |
| Santana | 2010 Tour | July 28, 2010 | Steve Winwood |
| Scorpions | Pure Instinct Tour | August 11, 1996 | Alice Cooper |
| Scotty McCreery | — | October 8, 2011 | —N/a |
| Seagram's Gin Live Tour | — | July 13, 2001 | —N/a |
| Shania Twain | Come On Over Tour | June 12, 1999 | Leahy |
| Sheryl Crow | Sheryl Crow Tour | September 24, 1997 | —N/a |
| Sheryl Crow | C'mon, C'mon Tour | July 12, 2002 | Train & O.A.R. |
| Slightly Stoopid & Dirty Heads | Slightly Dirty Summer Tour | July 26, 2024 | Common Kings & The Elevators |
| Smokin' Grooves Festival | — | September 7, 1996 | —N/a |
| Smokin' Grooves Festival | — | July 11, 1997 | —N/a |
| Smokin' Grooves Festival | — | August 27, 1998 | —N/a |
| Snoop Dogg & Wiz Khalifa | The High Road Summer Tour 2016 | July 26, 2016 | Kevin Gates & Jhené Aiko, Casey Veggies, DJ Drama |
| Spin Doctors | 1993 Tour | June 19, 1993 | Soul Asylum & Screaming Trees |
| Spin Doctors | Turn It Upside Down Tour | September 24, 1994 | —N/a |
| SoulFest | — | July 29, 1999 | —N/a |
| SoulFest | — | August 11, 2000 | —N/a |
| SoulFest | — | July 29, 2001 | —N/a |
| SoulFest | — | July 18, 2003 | —N/a |
| SoulFest | — | July 30, 2004 | —N/a |
| SoulFest | — | July 1, 2005 | —N/a |
| SoulFest | — | August 26, 2006 | —N/a |
| SoulFest | — | August 29, 2009 | —N/a |
| SoulFest | — | July 20, 2012 | —N/a |
| Staind & Breaking Benjamin | 2024 Tour | September 21, 2024 | Daughtry & Lakeview |
| Steely Dan | Citizen/Tracks Tour | August 30, 1994 | —N/a |
| Steely Dan | Art Crimes Tour | July 7, 1996 | —N/a |
| Steely Dan | Two Against Nature Tour | July 21, 2000 | —N/a |
| Steely Dan | Rockabye Gollie Angel 2015 Tour | August 6, 2015 | Elvis Costello & the Imposters |
| Steve Miller Band | 1992 Tour | July 31, 1992 | —N/a |
| Steve Miller Band | 1999 Tour | August 13, 1999 | George Thorogood, the Destroyers, Curtis Salgado |
| Steve Miller Band and Journey | 2014 Tour | May 29, 2014 | Tower of Power |
| Steven Curtis Chapman | The Abbey Road Sessions Tour | April 30, 2005 | Chris Tomlin & Casting Crowns |
| Stevie Nicks | Street Angel Tour | August 4, 1994 | Darden Smith |
| Stevie Nicks | Enchanted Tour | June 26, 1998 | Boz Scaggs |
| Stevie Nicks | Trouble in Shangri-La Tour | September 5, 2001 | Jeffrey Gaines |
| Sting | The Soul Cages Tour | September 20, 1991 | Squeeze |
| Sting | Mercury Falling Tour | June 29, 1996 | Natalie Merchant |
| Sting | Brand New Day Tour | September 8, 2000 | Liquid Soul & Jonny Lang |
| Sting | Sacred Love Tour | September 4, 2004 | Annie Lennox & Dominic Miller |
| Styx | Return to Paradise Tour | July 11, 1996 | Kansas |
| Styx | 2001 Tour | June 23, 2001 | Bad Company, Billy Squier & Joe Stark |
| Styx | Cyclorama Tour | June 18, 2004 | Peter Frampton & Nelson |
| Styx & Foreigner | The Renegades & Jukebox Heroes Tour | August 21, 2024 | John Waite |
| Sugarland | The Incredible Machine Tour | October 2, 2010 | Little Big Town & Randy Montana |
| Sugarland | In Your Hands Tour | April 28, 2012 | Lauren Alaina |
| SWV & Xscape | Queens of R&B Tour | July 20, 2024 | Mya, 702, Total, MC Lyte |
| Tears for Fears | The Tipping Point Tour | June 8, 2023 | Cold War Kids |
| Tedeschi Trucks Band | Wheels of Soul Tour | July 9, 2019 | Blackberry Smoke & Shovels & Rope |
| Tesla | Psychotic Supper Tour | May 16, 1992 | FireHouse |
| Tesla | Bust a Nut Tour | July 8, 1995 | —N/a |
| TLC & Shaggy | Hot Summer Nights 2023Tour | June 7, 2023 | En Vogue & Sean Kingston |
| Third Eye Blind | Summer Gods Tour | July 21, 2024 | Yellowcard & ARIZONA |
| Three Days Grace | One-X Tour | October 1, 2006 | Staind, Breaking Benjamin, Hinder, Crossfade |
| Three Days Grace | One-X Tour | September 26, 2007 | Breaking Benjamin, Seether, Skillet |
| Thomas Rhett | Very Hot Summer Tour | August 8, 2019 | Dustin Lynch, Rhett Akins, Russell Dickerson |
| Tim McGraw | A Place in the Sun Tour | July 24, 1999 | Dixie Chicks & the Warren Brothers |
| Tim McGraw | Live Like You Were Dying Tour | June 12, 2004 | Big and Rich & the Warren Brothers |
| Tim McGraw | Live Your Voice Tour | May 17, 2008 | Jason Aldean & Halfway to Hazard |
| Tim McGraw | Southern Voice Tour | July 24, 2010 | Lady Antebellum, Love and Theft, Danny Gokey |
| Tim McGraw | Emotional Traffic Tour | July 8, 2011 | Luke Bryan & the Band Perry |
| Tim McGraw | Two Lanes of Freedom Tour | May 4, 2013 | Brantley Gilbert & Love and Theft |
| Tim McGraw | Sundown Heaven Town Tour | June 22, 2014 | Kip Moore & Cassadee Pope |
| Tim McGraw | Shotgun Rider Tour | July 10, 2015 | Billy Currington & Chase Bryant |
| Tina Turner | What's Love? Tour | August 5, 1993 | —N/a |
| Tina Turner | Wildest Dreams Tour | June 19, 1997 | Cyndi Lauper |
| Toby Keith | Unleashed Tour | September 7, 2002 | Rascal Flatts & Paul Thorn |
| Toby Keith | Shock'n Y'all Tour | August 9, 2003 | Blake Shelton & Junior Brown |
| Toby Keith | Big Throwdown Tour | August 7, 2004 | Terri Clark & Scotty Emerick |
| Toby Keith | Big Throwdown II Tour | June 11, 2005 | Lee Ann Womack & Shooter Jennings |
| Toby Keith | White Trash with Money Tour | October 14, 2006 | Joe Nichols & Rushlow Harris |
| Toby Keith | Hookin' Up and Hangin' Out Tour | June 23, 2007 | Miranda Lambert, Flynnville Train, Trailer Choir |
| Toby Keith | Biggest and Baddest Tour | June 21, 2008 | Montgomery Gentry, Carter's Chord, Mica Roberts |
| Toby Keith | America's Toughest Tour | July 11, 2009 | Trace Adkins |
| Toby Keith | American Ride Tour | July 10, 2010 | Trace Adkins & James Otto |
| Toby Keith | Locked and Loaded Tour | July 22, 2011 | Eric Church & JT Hodges |
| Toby Keith | Love in Overdrive Tour | July 15, 2012 | Brantley Gilbert |
| Toby Keith | Good Times & Pick Up Lines Tour | July 17, 2015 | Chris Janson |
| Toby Keith | Interstates & Tailgates Tour | July 10, 2016 | —N/a |
| Tom Petty and the Heartbreakers | Into the Great Wide Open Tour | October 14, 1991 | Chris Whitley |
| Tom Petty and the Heartbreakers | Dogs With Wings Tour | April 12, 1995 | Pete Droge & the Jayhawks |
| Tom Petty and the Heartbreakers | Echo Tour | September 28, 1999 | The Blind Boys of Alabama |
| Tom Petty and the Heartbreakers | The Last DJ Tour | July 19, 2002 | The Brian Setzer Orchestra |
| Tom Petty and the Heartbreakers | 30th Anniversary Tour | September 10, 2006 | The Black Crowes |
| Tom Petty and the Heartbreakers | 2008 Tour | July 12, 2008 | Steve Winwood |
| Tom Petty and the Heartbreakers | Mojo Tour | September 18, 2010 | ZZ Top |
| Tony Bennett | 2001 Tour | August 5, 2001 | k.d. lang |
| Tool | Lateralus Tour | October 7, 2001 | Fantômas |
| Tori Amos | Lottapianos Tour | August 30, 2003 | Ben Folds & the Suburbs |
| Trace Adkins | Songs About Me Tour | May 25, 2006 | Gretchen Wilson |
| Train | Picasso at the Wheel Tour | June 10, 2015 | The Fray & Matt Nathanson |
| Train | Play That Song Tour | June 4, 2017 | O.A.R. & Natasha Bedingfield |
| Train | AM Gold Tour | July 1, 2022 | Jewel & Blues Traveler |
| Train | I Know, It's Been A Long Time Coming Tour | August 9, 2024 | REO Speedwagon & Yacht Rock Revue |
| Train & Goo Goo Dolls | Summer Tour 2019 | July 13, 2019 | Allen Stone |
| Travis Tritt | Strong Enough Tour | September 27, 2003 | Montgomery Gentry |
| Trey Anastasio | 2001 Tour | July 27, 2001 | —N/a |
| Trisha Yearwood | Real Live Woman Tour | June 17, 2000 | —N/a |
| Tyler Childers | On the Road Tour | April 23, 2025 | Deer Tick |
| Uproar Festival | — | September 11, 2012 | —N/a |
| Usher | 8701 Tour | June 1, 2002 | Faith Evans |
| Van Halen | For Unlawful Carnal Knowledge Tour | October 12, 1991 | Alice in Chains |
| Van Halen | Right Here Right Now Tour | July 21, 1993 | Vince Neil Band |
| Van Halen | The Balance "Ambulance" Tour | September 1, 1995 | Skid Row, Our Lady Peace, &Collective Soul |
| Van Halen | III Tour | August 18, 1998 | —N/a |
| Van Halen | Van Halen 2015 North American Tour | September 9, 2015 | Kenny Wayne Shepherd Band |
| Velvet Revolver | Contraband World Tour | May 5, 2005 | Hoobastank & Modern Day Zero |
| Vertical Horizon | Everything You Want Tour | August 12, 2000 | Third Eye Blind |
| Vertical Horizon | 2001 Tour | August 4, 2001 | —N/a |
| Vince Gill | 1999 Tour | August 28, 1999 | Deana Carter |
| Virginia Coalition | 2002 Tour | August 8, 2002 | —N/a |
| Warped Tour | — | June 27, 2006 | —N/a |
| Weezer & Panic! at the Disco | Weezer & Panic! at the Disco Summer Tour 2016 | June 21, 2016 | Andrew McMahon in the Wilderness |
| Weezer & Pixies | North American Tour | July 24, 2018 | The Wombats |
| Whiskey Myers | What We Were Born To Do Tour | October 26, 2024 | JJ Grey & Mofro & Colby Acuff |
| The Who | 1996-1997 World Tour | August 10, 1997 | Drivin' N' Cryin' |
| Widespread Panic | 1995 Tour | September 8, 1995 | —N/a |
| Widespread Panic | 1996 Tour | October 12, 1996 | Leftover Salmon, Vertical Horizon, Backsliders |
| Widespread Panic | Bombs and Butterflies Tour | July 12, 1997 | Gov't Mule & Gibb Droll |
| Widespread Panic | 1998 Tour | July 18, 1998 | Leftover Salmon, G. Love, Special Sauce, Guster |
| Widespread Panic | 'Til the Medicine Takes Tour | July 25, 1999 | —N/a |
| Widespread Panic | 2000 Tour | April 29, 2000 | —N/a |
| Widespread Panic | 2001 Tour | April 21, 2001 | —N/a |
| Widespread Panic | 2002 Tour | April 19, 2002 | —N/a |
| Widespread Panic | 2002 Tour | April 20, 2002 | —N/a |
| Widespread Panic | Ball Tour | April 25, 2003 | —N/a |
| Widespread Panic | Ball Tour | April 26, 2003 | —N/a |
| Widespread Panic | 2005 Tour | April 22, 2005 | Tea Leaf Green |
| Widespread Panic | 2005 Tour | April 23, 2005 | Tea Leaf Green |
| Widespread Panic | Earth to America Tour | April 21, 2006 | The Dynamites |
| Widespread Panic | Earth to America Tour | April 22, 2006 | The Dynamites |
| Widespread Panic | 2007 Tour | April 20, 2007 | North Mississippi Allstars |
| Widespread Panic | 2007 Tour | April 21, 2007 | North Mississippi Allstars |
| Widespread Panic | Free Somehow Tour | April 25, 2008 | DJ Logic |
| Widespread Panic | Free Somehow Tour | April 26, 2008 | DJ Logic |
| Widespread Panic | Dirty Side Down Tour | April 23, 2010 | Band of Horses |
| Widespread Panic | Dirty Side Down Tour | April 24, 2010 | Band of Horses |
| Widespread Panic | Spring Tour | April 30, 2016 | Jason Isbell |
| Wilco | 1998 Tour | August 15, 1998 | Lyle Lovett & Joan Baez |
| Yes | Union Tour | July 10, 1991 | —N/a |
| Yes | Talk Tour | August 14, 1994 | —N/a |
| Yes | Masterworks Tour | July 27, 2000 | Kansas |
| Zac Brown Band | You Get What You Give Tour | August 11, 2010 | The Wood Brothers & Casey Driessen |
| Zac Brown Band | Uncaged Tour | May 11, 2012 | Blackberry Smoke & Levi Lowrey |
| Zac Brown Band | 2013 Tour | June 21, 2013 | Levi Lowrey |
| Zac Brown Band | Great American Road Trip Tour | October 9, 2014 | Ryan Kinder |
| Zac Brown Band | Jekyll + Hyde Tour | May 7, 2015 | Jason Isbell |
| Zac Brown Band | Welcome Home Tour | October 6, 2017 | Darrell Brown & Madison Ryann Ward |
| Zac Brown Band | Down the Rabbit Hole Live | April 13, 2019 | Moon Taxi |
| Zac Brown Band | From the Fire Tour | October 5, 2023 | Tenille Townes & King Calaway |
| Ziggy Marley | Another Roadside Attraction | August 27, 1993 | Hothouse Flowers, Midnight Oil, Daniel Lanois |
| ZZ Top | Beer Drinkers and Hell Raisers Tour | May 9, 2003 | Ted Nugent & Kenny Wayne Shepherd |
| ZZ Top | 50th Anniversary Tour | October 5, 2019 | Cheap Trick |

== See also ==
- List of contemporary amphitheaters
- Live Nation
