= For You (Keith Urban song) =

Single by Keith Urban

from the album Act of Valor: The Album
- Released: 16 April 2012
- Recorded: 2012
- Genre: Country rock
- Length: 4:50 (album version); 3:43 (single version)
- Label: Capitol Nashville; Hit Red; Relativity Media
- Songwriters: Keith Urban; Monty Powell
- Producers: Dann Huff; Keith Urban

Keith Urban singles chronology
"You Gonna Fly" (2011)	"For You" (2012)	"Little Bit of Everything" (2013)

Alternative cover
- Digital single cover

"For You" is a song co-written and recorded by Australian country music singer Keith Urban. It is included on Act of Valor: The Album, and plays over the closing credits to the film Act of Valor. It was released as a single in April 2012. The song was nominated at the 70th Golden Globe Awards for Best Original Song.

== History ==
The song is about the sacrifices made by soldiers. The single was certified Gold in the US in early February 2013. Urban said in a statement (reported by The Boot) that he and Monty Powell were inspired to write the song after seeing Act of Valor, and that he "wanted to capture the essence of not only what these men and women do so extraordinarily, but how that relates to all of us." All proceeds from the single are donated to the Navy SEAL Foundation.

== Critical reception ==
In his review of the album, Billy Dukes of Taste of Country wrote that the song "sets the tone and is especially powerful."

Kevin John Coyne of Country Universe gave the song a B−, saying that Urban's voice was "typically sincere", although he called the production "overblown" and criticized the lyrics by saying "the opening reference to his wife and unborn child feel tacked on."

The song was nominated both at the 70th Golden Globe Awards and at the 18th Critics' Choice Awards in the respective Best Original Song categories.

== Music video ==
The video features Urban singing the song in a desert with a full band, and some shots of just him and a guitar playing. Scott Waugh, who co-directed "Act of Valor" directed the video, which also shows scenes from the movie and real bombs and explosives going off at the beginning of each chorus. It was filmed in CA's Mojave Desert, where much of the movie was also filmed.

== Chart performance ==
Chart (2012)	Peak position
Canada Hot 100 (Billboard)	84
Canada Country (Billboard)	12
US Billboard Hot 100	55
US Hot Country Songs (Billboard)	6

=== Year-end charts ===
Chart (2012)	Position
US Country Songs (Billboard)	34

== Certifications ==
Region	Certification	Certified units/sales
United States (RIAA)	Gold	500,000^{^}
^{^} Shipments figures based on certification alone.
