= Put You in a Song =

Single by Keith Urban

from the album Get Closer
- Released: 13 September 2010
- Recorded: 2010
- Genre: Country
- Length: 3:38
- Label: Capitol Nashville
- Songwriters: Keith Urban; Jedd Hughes; Sarah Buxton
- Producers: Keith Urban; Dann Huff

Keith Urban singles chronology
"I'm In" (2010)	"Put You in a Song" (2010)	"Without You" (2011)

"Put You in a Song" is a song co-written and recorded by Australian country music singer Keith Urban. It was released on 13 September 2010, as the first single from his 2010 album Get Closer. The song peaked at number 2 on the US Billboard Hot Country Songs chart. Urban wrote this song with Sarah Buxton and Jedd Hughes.

== Content ==
"Put You in a Song" is about a guy's desire to write a song about the girl he adores. According to Urban, it's about a "guy in love with the unattainable girl. And the idea that the only chance that this poor guy is ever going to have to get close to the object of his affection is to put her in a song...that way he'd be able to take her with him everywhere he goes...day and night."

== Music video ==
The music video premiered on October 1, 2010, during CMT's Big New Music Weekend. It features footage of Keith Urban recording the song in a studio and was shot/directed by Brad Belanger.

== Critical reception ==
Matt Bjorke of Roughstock gave the song a four-out-of-five star rating, citing it "a sing-a-long quality song that will no doubt rocket up the country radio charts." Leeann Ward of Country Universe gave the song a B+ grade, concluding her review by comparing the sound to the tracks on Urban's 2004 album Be Here, and calling it "hopeful for the upcoming album."

== Chart performance ==
"Put You in a Song" debuted at number 29 on the U.S. Billboard Hot Country Songs chart for the week of October 2, 2010. It soon peaked at number 2 on that chart, behind Kenny Chesney's "Somewhere with You". It also debuted at number 82 on the U.S. Billboard Hot 100 chart for the week of October 2, 2010, and number 66 on the Canadian Hot 100 chart for the week of October 9, 2010.

Chart (2010–2011)	Peak position
Canada Hot 100 (Billboard)	49
Canada Country (Billboard)	2
US Billboard Hot 100	53
US Hot Country Songs (Billboard)	2

=== Year-end charts ===
Chart (2011)	Position
US Country Songs (Billboard)	42

== Certifications ==
Region	Certification	Certified units/sales
United States (RIAA)	Gold	500,000^{‡}
^{‡} Sales+streaming figures based on certification alone.
