= Without You (Keith Urban song) =

Single by Keith Urban

from the album Get Closer
- Released: 7 February 2011
- Recorded: 2010
- Genre: Country; country pop; pop rock
- Length: 3:56
- Label: Capitol Nashville
- Songwriters: Joe West; Dave Pahanish
- Producers: Dann Huff; Keith Urban

Keith Urban singles chronology
"Put You in a Song" (2010)	"Without You" (2011)	"Long Hot Summer" (2011)

"Without You" is a song written by Joe West and Dave Pahanish and recorded by Australian country music artist Keith Urban. It was released in February 2011 as the second single from Urban's 2010 album Get Closer. The song reached number one on the U.S. Billboard Hot Country Songs chart.

This song should not be confused with another song of the same title that Urban had recorded on his Australian self-titled 1991 debut album.

== Background ==
Urban described the song as his "life story" and considered it "an amazing song that [he] would have never allowed [himself] to write."

== Content ==
"Without You" is a ballad in which the narrator says that his life would not have any meaning without his lover. This song is set in the key of A-flat major and is accompanied mainly by acoustic guitar, banjo and fiddle. It has a main chord pattern of A♭-A♭/G♭-D♭sus2/F-D♭ and a vocal range from E♭_{3} to F_{4}.

== Critical reception ==
Matt Bjorke of Roughstock gave the song five stars out of five, citing it a song that "suits Keith Urban and his life with wife Nicole Kidman." Blake Boldt of Engine 145 gave the song a "thumbs down," stating that Urban is "at his best when exploring heart's aches and pains," and saying that it "lacks the excitement of past hits."

== Music video ==
The video for the song was directed by Chris Hicky. Filmed entirely in black-and-white, it shows Urban performing the song while seated on a stool in an empty bedroom, while home footage of his personal and professional life is shown projected onto the background. Keith would use this same setup (complete with black-and-white lighting) for his performance of the song at the 2011 ACM Awards.

== Chart performance ==
"Without You" debuted at number 47 on the Billboard Hot Country Songs charts for the week of 19 February 2011. It also debuted at number 95 on the U.S. Billboard Hot 100 chart for the week of 26 March 2011.

Chart (2011)	Peak position
Australia (ARIA)	39
Canada Country (Billboard)	2
Canada Hot 100 (Billboard)	69
US Billboard Hot 100	52
US Hot Country Songs (Billboard)	1

=== Year-end charts ===
Chart (2011)	Position
US Country Songs (Billboard)	29

== Certifications ==
Region	Certification	Certified units/sales
Australia (ARIA)	Gold	35,000^{‡}
United States (RIAA)	Gold	500,000^{‡}
^{‡} Sales+streaming figures based on certification alone.
