= You Gonna Fly =

Single by Keith Urban

from the album Get Closer
- Released: 24 October 2011
- Recorded: 2010
- Genre: Country
- Length: 3:36
- Label: Capitol Nashville
- Songwriters: Preston Brust; Chris Lucas; Jaren Johnston
- Producers: Dann Huff; Keith Urban

Keith Urban singles chronology
"Long Hot Summer" (2011)	"You Gonna Fly" (2011)	"For You" (2012)

"You Gonna Fly" is a song written by Preston Brust, Chris Lucas, and Jaren Johnston, and recorded by Australian country music artist Keith Urban. It was released in October 2011 as fourth and final single from Urban's 2010 album Get Closer. The song reached number one on the U.S. Billboard Hot Country Songs chart in March 2012.

== Content ==
Preston Brust and Chris Lucas of the country duo LoCash wrote the song with Jaren Johnston. According to Brust, a Sony/ATV Music Publishing representative suggested that he and Lucas write with Johnston. Johnston suggested on adding a lyric about a "[b]lackbird on a country street / Hiding from the world with a broken wing", and wrote a song about a man convincing a woman if she "gonna fly with [him]".

== Music video ==
The music video was directed by Brad Belanger and premiered in January 2012.

== Critical reception ==
Billy Dukes of Taste of Country gave the song four stars out of five, saying that it "doesn't do much to separate itself from many of Urban's other uptempo hits" but "puts a big smile on your face from start to finish." Tara Seetharam of Country Universe gave the song a B+, calling his delivery "so three-dimensional that it practically pulls you into the bed of his truck." Liv Carter of Urban Country News gave the song a 'thumbs-up', stating that "the vocal performance, full of delight, infuses the character in the song with so much confidence and joy he becomes irresistible."

== Chart performance ==
"You Gonna Fly" debuted at number 45 on the U.S. Billboard Hot Country Songs chart for the week of November 5, 2011. It debuted at number 91 on the U.S. Billboard Hot 100 chart for the week of December 24, 2011. It debuted at number 89 on the Canadian Hot 100 chart for the week of December 31, 2011. In March 2012 it became Urban's fourteenth number one single on the country charts.

Chart (2011–2012)	Peak position
Canada Hot 100 (Billboard)	66
Canada Country (Billboard)	1
US Billboard Hot 100	54
US Hot Country Songs (Billboard)	1

=== Year-end charts ===
Chart (2012)	Position
US Country Songs (Billboard)	23

== Certifications ==
Region	Certification	Certified units/sales
United States (RIAA)	Gold	500,000^{‡}
^{‡} Sales+streaming figures based on certification alone.
