= Long Hot Summer (Keith Urban song) =

2011 single by Keith Urban

Single by Keith Urban

from the album Get Closer
- Released: 27 June 2011
- Recorded: 2010
- Genre: Country; country rock
- Length: 4:33 (album version); 3:52 (radio version)
- Label: Capitol Nashville
- Songwriters: Richard Marx; Keith Urban
- Producers: Dann Huff; Keith Urban

Keith Urban singles chronology
"Without You" (2011)	"Long Hot Summer" (2011)	"You Gonna Fly" (2011)

"Long Hot Summer" is a song co-written and recorded by Australian country music artist Keith Urban. It was released in June 2011 as the third single from his 2010 album Get Closer. They reached number one on the U.S. Billboard Hot Country Songs chart for the week of 22 October 2011. Urban wrote this song with Richard Marx.

== Critical reception ==
Nate Chinen of The New York Times wrote that the song was "one of the friskier tunes" on the album. Dan Milliken of Country Universe gave the song a B grade, saying that it is the "closest he’s come in two albums to capturing his old uptempo spark." Coyne states the song could function as a "prequel to the melancholy, ''Til Summer Comes Around'". Billy Dukes of Taste of Country gave the song four and a half stars out of five, saying that the only criticism is the "early guitar work that runs beneath the song’s first verse" and that "only the grouchiest of grouchies can frown on."

== Music video ==
The music video was directed by Trey Fanjoy and premiered on 16 August 2011 on CMT. It featured Summer Glau as the female lead.

== Charts ==
=== Weekly charts ===
Weekly chart performance for "Long Hot Summer"
Chart (2011)	Peak position
Australia (ARIA)	82
Canada Country (Billboard)	1
Canada Hot 100 (Billboard)	35
US Billboard Hot 100	45
US Hot Country Songs (Billboard)	1

=== Year-end charts ===
Year-end chart performance for "Long Hot Summer"
Chart (2011)	Position
US Country Songs (Billboard)	22

== Certifications ==
Region	Certification	Certified units/sales
Australia (ARIA)	Platinum	70,000^{‡}
United States (RIAA)	Platinum	1,000,000^{‡}
^{‡} Sales+streaming figures based on certification alone.
