= You Look Good in My Shirt =

Single by Keith Urban

from the album Golden Road
- Released: June 17, 2008
- Recorded: 2002 (Original version); 2008 (Re-recorded version)
- Genre: Country rock
- Length: 3:47 (Golden Road version); 3:55 (Greatest Hits: 19 Kids version)
- Label: Capitol Nashville
- Songwriters: Mark Nesler; Tom Shapiro; Tony Martin
- Producers: Dann Huff; Keith Urban

Keith Urban singles chronology
"In God's Hands" (2008)	"You Look Good in My Shirt" (2008)	"Start a Band" (2008)

Music video
- "You Look Good in My Shirt" at CMT.com

"You Look Good in My Shirt" is a song, written by Mark Nesler, Tom Shapiro, and Tony Martin and recorded by Australian country music artist Keith Urban for his 2002 album Golden Road. The original version charted at number 60 on the country charts in 2004 based on unsolicited airplay, while a re-recorded version of the song (which was included on a re-issue of Urban's 2007 Greatest Hits: 18 Kids compilation album) was issued as a single in June 2008. For the chart week of September 6, 2008, it has become Urban's eighth Number One song and his first Number One since "Better Life" reached Number One in late 2005.

== Content ==
The song is an up-tempo based on electric guitar riffs. Its lyrics tell of a male and female who had previously broken up, but reunited the night before, as stated in the last half of the first verse. The chorus takes place the morning after their reunion, where the male character then sees that the female is wearing nothing but his shirt, and although he is uncertain about their relationship, he likes how she looks.

== Critical reception ==
Ben Cisneros of Engine 145 gave the song a "thumbs up" rating. His review made note of the "70's guitar fills" and the simple song structure, which "kept the cuteness in this one from crossing over from enjoyable into insufferable territory".

== History ==
"You Look Good in My Shirt" was initially planned to be released as the fifth and final single from Urban's 2002 album Golden Road. However, it was withdrawn and replaced with "Days Go By", the first single from his next album 2004's Be Here. Even though the song had been withdrawn before it could be promoted as a single, the version from Golden Road received enough airplay to reach #60 on the Billboard country charts.

In June 2008, Urban re-recorded the song and officially released that new version as a single. According to Urban, his intention to re-record the song was to "bring all of the live energy" to it, since the song had become a regular feature of his concerts and had gained popularity among fans. The newly-recorded rendition debuted at number 42 on the Hot Country Songs chart for the week of June 14, 2008. On the chart dated for September 6, 2008, the song became Urban's eighth Number One hit on the U.S. country charts. In addition to its inclusion on the live DVD, the newly-recorded version of "You Look Good in My Shirt" was also featured on a re-issue of Urban's compilation album Greatest Hits: 18 Kids album, which was re-titled Greatest Hits: 19 Kids in order to indicate the addition of a new track.

== Music video ==
The music video was recorded live in Atlanta, GA, during Urban's Love, Pain, & The Whole Crazy World Tour. It was directed by Chris Hicky.

== Chart performance ==
The initial version of "You Look Good in My Shirt" spent one week at #60 on the Billboard country charts. The 2008 re-recording reached Number One on the country charts on the chart week of September 6, 2008, giving Urban his first Billboard Number One since "Better Life" three years previous.

=== Golden Road version ===
Chart (2004)	Peak position
US Hot Country Songs (Billboard)	60

=== 2008 re-recording ===
Chart (2008)	Peak position
Canada Country (Billboard)	1
Canada Hot 100 (Billboard)	54
US Billboard Hot 100	44
US Hot Country Songs (Billboard)	1

==== Year-end charts ====
Chart (2008)	Position
Canada Country (Billboard)	5
US Country Songs (Billboard)	17

== Certifications ==
Region	Certification	Certified units/sales
Australia (ARIA)	Gold	35,000^{‡}
United States (RIAA)	Gold	500,000^{‡}
^{‡} Sales+streaming figures based on certification alone.
