= Greatest Hits: 18 Kids =

Album by Keith Urban

Greatest hits album by Keith Urban
- Released: 20 November 2007
- Genre: Country
- Length: 75:26 (18 Kids); 79:21 (19 Kids)
- Label: Capitol Nashville
- Producer: Dann Huff; Matt Rollings; Keith Urban

Keith Urban chronology
Love, Pain & the Whole Crazy Thing (2006)	Greatest Hits: 18 Kids (2007)	Defying Gravity (2009)

Singles from Greatest Hits: 19 Kids
- 1. "You Look Good in My Shirt" Released: 17 June 2008

Professional ratings
Review scores
Source	Rating
AllMusic	4.5/5 stars
Slant Magazine	3.5/5 stars

Greatest Hits: 18 Kids (known as Greatest Hits: 19 Kids on the reissue) is a greatest hits album by Keith Urban, released on 20 November 2007 by Capitol Nashville. It contains 16 of Urban's hits as well as two new songs. Two versions of the album were released: a regular edition and a special edition; the second disc includes 12 music videos. Both versions use the radio edits of Urban's songs, except for "Stupid Boy", "Better Life", and "Somebody Like You". Also included is a cover of Steve Forbert's 1980 single "Romeo's Tune" and a re-recording of the non-single "Got It Right This Time", from his 2006 album Love, Pain & the Whole Crazy Thing.

The album debuted at number 11 on the U.S. Billboard 200 chart, selling at least 117,000 copies in its first week. It received a Gold certification from both the RIAA and CRIA. It has sold 1,208,700 copies in the U.S. as of April 2017.

== Re-issue ==
The album was re-released as Greatest Hits: 19 Kids on 19 August 2008 to include a newly recorded version of "You Look Good in My Shirt". This song was originally recorded on his 2002 album Golden Road, and the newly recorded version was issued as a single in June 2008.

== Track listing ==
Original release as Greatest Hits: 18 Kids
No.	Title	Writer(s)	Album	Length
1.	"Romeo's Tune"	Steve Forbert	previously unreleased	3:47
2.	"Got It Right This Time (The Celebration)"	Keith Urban	previously unreleased	4:44
3.	"I Told You So" (radio edit)	Urban	Love, Pain & the Whole Crazy Thing	4:02
4.	"Stupid Boy"	Sarah Buxton; Deanna Bryant; Dave Berg	Love, Pain & the Whole Crazy Thing	6:21
5.	"Better Life"	Richard Marx; Urban	Be Here	4:43
6.	"Making Memories of Us" (radio edit)	Rodney Crowell	Be Here	3:56
7.	"Once in a Lifetime" (radio edit)	John Shanks; Urban	Love, Pain & the Whole Crazy Thing	4:11
8.	"Tonight I Wanna Cry"	Monty Powell; Urban	Be Here	4:19
9.	"You're My Better Half" (radio edit)	Shanks; Urban	Be Here	3:59
10.	"Days Go By"	Powell; Urban	Be Here	3:49
11.	"But for the Grace of God" (radio edit)	Charlotte Caffey; Urban; Jane Wiedlin	Keith Urban	3:44
12.	"You'll Think of Me" (single version)	Darrell Brown; Ty Lacy; Dennis Matkosky	Golden Road	3:51
13.	"Who Wouldn't Wanna Be Me" (single version)	Powell; Urban	Golden Road	3:41
14.	"Raining on Sunday" (radio edit)	Brown; Radney Foster	Golden Road	3:54
15.	"Where the Blacktop Ends" (radio edit)	Allen Shamblin; Steve Wariner	Keith Urban	3:06
16.	"Your Everything" (radio edit)	Chris Lindsey; Bob Regan	Keith Urban	3:59
17.	"Somebody Like You"	Shanks; Urban	Golden Road	5:23
18.	"Everybody" (radio edit)	Marx; Urban	Love, Pain & the Whole Crazy Thing	3:57
Total length:				75:21

Greatest Hits: 19 Kids re-release
No.	Title	Writer(s)	Length
19.	"You Look Good in My Shirt"	Tony Martin; Mark Nesler; Tom Shapiro	3:55
Total length:			79:21

Special edition DVD
No.	Title	Length
1.	"I Told You So"	4:26
2.	"Stupid Boy"	6:14
3.	"Once in a Lifetime"	4:26
4.	"Tonight I Wanna Cry"	4:18
5.	"Better Life"	5:11
6.	"Making Memories of Us"	4:05
7.	"You're My Better Half"	4:11
8.	"Days Go By"	3:48
9.	"You'll Think of Me"	4:49
10.	"Who Wouldn't Wanna Be Me"	4:41
11.	"Raining on Sunday"	4:44
12.	"Somebody Like You"	4:00

== Personnel ==
"Romeo's Tune"

- Tom Bukovac – electric guitar
- Perry Coleman – background vocals
- Jerry Flowers – background vocals
- Dann Huff – acoustic guitar
- Charlie Judge – keyboards
- Chris McHugh – drums
- Steve Nathan – piano, Hammond B-3 organ
- Jimmie Lee Sloas – bass guitar
- Keith Urban – lead vocals, background vocals, electric guitar, ganjo

"Got It Right This Time (The Celebration)"

- Tom Bukovac – electric guitar
- Jerry Flowers – background vocals
- Dann Huff – electric guitar, background vocals
- Charlie Judge – keyboards
- Chris McHugh – drums
- Steve Nathan – Hammond B-3 organ
- Jimmie Lee Sloas – bass guitar
- Keith Urban – Fender Rhodes, piano, electric guitar, slide guitar solo, lead vocals, background vocals

"You Look Good in My Shirt"

- Dann Huff – electric guitar
- Charlie Judge – keyboards
- Chris McHugh – drums
- Jimmie Lee Sloas – bass guitar
- Russell Terrell – background vocals
- Keith Urban – electric guitar, lead vocals, background vocals

== Chart performance ==
=== Weekly charts ===
Chart (2007)	Peak position
Australian Albums (ARIA)	7
Australian Country Albums (ARIA)	2
Canadian Albums (Billboard)	10
US Billboard 200	11
US Top Country Albums (Billboard)	4

=== Year-end charts ===
Chart (2008)	Position
US Billboard 200	58
US Top Country Albums (Billboard)	11
Chart (2009)	Position
US Top Country Albums (Billboard)	63

=== Singles ===
Year	Single	Peak chart positions		
Year	Single	US Country	US	CAN
2008	"You Look Good in My Shirt"	1	44	54

== Certifications ==
Region	Certification	Certified units/sales
Australia (ARIA)	3× Platinum	210,000^{‡}
Canada (Music Canada)	Platinum	100,000^{^}
United Kingdom (BPI)	Silver	60,000^{‡}
United States (RIAA)	Platinum	1,208,700
^{^} Shipments figures based on certification alone.^{‡} Sales+streaming figures based on certification alone.
