= Almost My Record =

EP by Sarah Buxton
- Released: 2007
- Genre: Country
- Length: 23:27
- Label: Lyric Street
- Producer: Craig Wiseman, Dann Huff, Sarah Buxton

Sarah Buxton chronology
Almost My Record (2007)	Sarah Buxton (2010)

Almost My Record is an extended play released by American country music singer Sarah Buxton. It was released in 2007 via Lyric Street Records. The album includes the singles "Innocence," "That Kind of Day" and "Space," all of which charted in the top 40 of the Billboard Hot Country Songs chart. Also included is her rendition of "Stupid Boy," which Keith Urban released as a single from his 2006 album Love, Pain & the Whole Crazy Thing.

It received a positive review from Country Standard Time critic Michael Sudhalter, who thought that "Stupid Boy" worked better from a female's perspective, and called "Innocence" "one of the best songs about reminiscing of young love since Deana Carter's 'Strawberry Wine'."

== Track listing ==
All tracks are written by Sarah Buxton, with additional co-writers as noted; except "Love Is a Trip," written by Lee Thomas Miller and Craig Wiseman.

No.	Title	Writer(s)	Length
1.	"Space"	Chuck Cannon; Lari White	3:15
2.	"American Daughters"	Bob DiPiero	3:47
3.	"That Kind of Day"	Greg Barnhill; Jeremy Stover	3:25
4.	"Innocence"	Stover; Dave Berg; Georgia Middleman	3:42
5.	"Love Is a Trip"		3:46
6.	"Stupid Boy"	Berg; Deanna Bryant	5:32
Total length:			23:27
