= Fix (EP) =

EP by Chris Lane
- Released: November 13, 2015
- Genre: Country
- Length: 19:07
- Label: Big Loud
- Producer: Joey Moi

Chris Lane chronology
Let's Ride (2012)	Fix (2015)	Girl Problems (2016)

Singles from Fix
- 1. "Fix" Released: October 30, 2015; 2. "For Her" Released: August 29, 2016

Fix is the first EP by American country music singer Chris Lane. It was released on November 13, 2015 by Big Loud Records. The album was produced by Joey Moi, who has worked with fellow country music artists Florida Georgia Line and Dallas Smith. The EP's lead single "Fix" was released two weeks prior to the EP's digital release, and reached to number 21 on Billboard Hot Country Songs chart. On April 15, 2016, the album saw a physical releases exclusively on Target, which included two bonus tracks.

== Commercial performance ==
The album debuted at No. 46 on the Top Country Albums chart, selling 1,100 copies in the first week. It peaked at No. 23 on the chart in May the following year. It has sold 15,000 copies in the United States as of July 2016.

== Track listing ==
No.	Title	Writer(s)	Length
1.	"Fix"	Sarah Buxton; Jesse Frasure; Abe Stoklasa	3:11
2.	"Cool"	Josh Osborne; Trevor Rosen; Frasure	3:17
3.	"For Her"	Matt Dragstrem; Kelly Archer; Buxton	3:32
4.	"Saturday Night"	Luke Laird; Shane McAnally; Ashley Gorley	3:30
5.	"Stolen Car"	Buxton; Archer; Daniel Tashian	2:52
6.	"Her Own Kind of Beautiful"	Dragstrem; Rodney Clawson; Barry Dean	2:45
Total length:			19:07

Target exclusive bonus tracks
No.	Title	Writer(s)	Length
7.	"Drinkin' Games"	Zach Crowell; Matt Jenkins; Adam Sanders; Chris Lane	3:21
8.	"Fix" (live acoustic)	Buxton; Frasure; Stoklasa	3:13
Total length:			25:41

== Chart performance ==
Chart (2015–16)	Peak position
US Top Country Albums (Billboard)	23
US Heatseekers Albums (Billboard)	4
US Independent Albums (Billboard)	40
