= Sarah Buxton (album) =

Studio album by Sarah Buxton
- Released: February 23, 2010
- Studio: Sound Kitchen (Franklin, Tennessee); Blackbird Studio, Masterfonics, The Mix Mill, Quad Studios, The Rukkas Room and The Tin Ear (Nashville, Tennessee)
- Genre: Country
- Length: 43:16
- Label: Lyric Street Records
- Producer: Sarah Buxton; Blair Daly; Bob DiPiero; Dann Huff; Craig Wiseman

Sarah Buxton chronology
Almost My Record (2007)	Sarah Buxton (2010)	Signs of Life (2020)

Singles from Sarah Buxton
- 1. "Outside My Window" Released: June 29, 2009

Professional ratings
Review scores
Source	Rating
Allmusic	3/5 stars
Country Weekly	3.5/5 stars

Sarah Buxton is the debut studio album by American country music artist of the same name. It was released on February 23, 2010, by Lyric Street Records. The album's only single, "Outside My Window," was released in June 2009 and was a Top 25 hit on the U.S. Billboard Hot Country Songs chart, reaching a peak of number 23 in March 2010. The album also includes Buxton's previous three singles that were released on her extended-play, Almost My Record. As of April 2010, the album has sold nearly 30,000 copies.

== History ==
Prior to its release, Buxton issued a six-song extended play entitled Almost My Record. This EP produced the singles "Innocence," "That Kind of Day" and "Space," all of which charted in the country music Top 40. Those three singles and two other tracks from the EP are included on this album, as is her fourth single, "Outside My Window." Buxton co-wrote ten of the eleven songs, including "Stupid Boy," which was previously released by Keith Urban as a single from his 2006 album Love, Pain & the Whole Crazy Thing.

== Critical reception ==
Jessica Phillips of Country Weekly magazine described Buxton's vocal range as "transform[ing] from sunny to sweet[…]to scratchy and soulful" and referred to the songs' topics as "being a typical 20-something-year-old girl in America." Phillips gave the album three-and-a-half stars out of five. Bobby Peacock of Roughstock also described Buxton's voice favorably and called the lyrics "optimistic," but thought that some tracks were overproduced. Stephen Thomas Erlewine considered the album "carefully constructed, with each element designed to reach the broadest possible audience" but said that it also showed that Buxton is "a solid writer and performer,"ultimately giving it three stars out of five.

== Track listing ==
No.	Title	Writer(s)	Length
1.	"American Daughters"	Sarah Buxton; Bob DiPiero	3:47
2.	"Outside My Window"	Buxton; Gary Burr; Mark Hudson; Victoria Shaw	3:46
3.	"Radio Love" (featuring Jedd Hughes)	Buxton; Hughes; Steve Robson	4:01
4.	"For Real"	Buxton; DiPiero	3:49
5.	"Wings" (featuring Jedd Hughes)	Buxton; Blair Daly	4:01
6.	"Love Like Heaven"	Buxton; Daly	3:44
7.	"Space"	Buxton; Chuck Cannon; Lari White	3:15
8.	"Innocence"	Buxton; Jeremy Stover; Dave Berg; Georgia Middleman	3:43
9.	"That Kind of Day"	Buxton; Stover; Greg Barnhill	3:26
10.	"Stupid Boy"	Buxton; Berg; Deanna Bryant	5:30
11.	"Big Blue Sky" (featuring Jedd Hughes)	Hughes; Luke Laird	4:06
Total length:			43:16

Amazon MP3 Exclusive
No.	Title	Writer(s)	Length
12.	"Crazy Dream"	Buxton; Craig Wiseman	4:10
Total length:			47:16

== Personnel ==
=== Musicians ===
- Sarah Buxton – vocals, backing vocals (2, 4, 7), harmonica (6)
- Tim Akers – keyboards (1, 8, 10), accordion (1, 8)
- Tony Harrell – keyboards (1, 4, 8, 10)
- Charlie Judge – synthesizers (3, 5), organ (3), accordion (3)
- Gary Smith – Hammond B3 organ (6)
- Greg Barnhill – keyboards (9)
- Tom Bukovac – guitars (1, 8–10), acoustic guitars (2), electric guitars (2, 5), bass (2)
- Dann Huff – guitars (1, 8–10), acoustic guitars (3), acoustic 12-string guitar (5), electric guitars (5), banjo (5)
- Jedd Hughes – electric guitars (3, 5), electric guitar solo (3), backing vocals (3), acoustic guitars (5, 11), vocals (11)
- J.T. Corenflos – electric guitars (4, 7)
- Mike Durham – electric guitars (6)
- Troy Lancaster – electric guitars (6)
- Curt Ryle – acoustic guitars (6)
- Russ Pahl – steel guitar (1, 8–10)
- Dan Dugmore – steel guitar (2, 3, 5, 7), lap steel guitar (4), acoustic guitars (7)
- Jonathan Yudkin – mandolin (1, 8), fiddle (1), strings (7)
- Gordie Sampson – mandolin (3, 5, 11), backing vocals (3, 5), accordion (5, 11)
- Wanda Vick – bouzouki (6)
- Jimmie Lee Sloas – bass (1, 3, 5, 8–10)
- Glenn Worf – bass (4)
- Steve Bryant – bass (6)
- Alison Prestwood – bass (7)
- Chris McHugh – drums (1, 3, 5)
- Greg Morrow – drums (2, 4)
- Brian Pruitt – drums (6), percussion (6)
- Shawn Fichter – drums (7)
- Matt Chamberlain – drums (8–10)
- Eric Darken – percussion (3, 5)
- Joanna Janét – backing vocals (1, 8)
- Caitlin Evanson – backing vocals (2)
- Perry Coleman – backing vocals (4)
- Blair Daly – backing vocals (6)

=== Production ===
- Doug Howard – A&R direction
- Dann Huff – producer (1, 3, 5, 8–11)
- Craig Wiseman – producer (1, 8–10)
- Sarah Buxton – producer (2, 4, 6, 7), wardrobe stylist
- Bob DiPiero – producer (4)
- Blair Daly – producer (6)
- Darrell Franklin – A&R coordinator (1, 3, 5, 811)
- Mike "Frog" Griffith – production coordinator (1, 3, 5, 8–11)
- Leslie Tomasino DiPiero – production coordinator (2)
- Sherri Halford – creative coordinator (Los Angeles, California)
- Kristin Barlowe – photography
- Ashley Heron – art direction
- Betsy McHugh – art direction, management for Martingale Entertainment
- Glenn Sweitzer – art direction, design
- Jana Hilton – grooming
- Tracy Moyer – grooming
- Jedd Hughes – wardrobe stylist
- David Kaufman – wardrobe stylist

Technical credits

- Adam Ayan – mastering at Gateway Mastering (Portland, Maine)
- Jeff Balding – recording (1, 8–10), mixing (7)
- Mark Hagen – recording (1, 8–10), overdub recording (1, 8–10), recording (3, 5), recording assistant (11)
- Mills Logan – recording (1, 7–10), drum recording (2), vocal recording (2), mixing (4)
- Justin Niebank – mixing (1–3, 5, 8–11), recording (3, 5)
- Mark Dobson – recording (2)
- Jason Gantt – recording (4)
- A.J. Derrick – recording (6)
- Jamie Tate – mixing (6)
- Chip Matthews – vocal recording (7), string recording (7)
- Jed Hackett – recording assistant (1, 8–10)
- Greg Lawrence – recording assistant (1, 8–10), mix assistant (3, 5, 11)
- Drew Bollman – mix assistant (1, 8–10), recording (11)
- Mike Rooney – recording assistant (3, 5)
- Nathan Yarborough – recording assistant (3, 5)
- Christopher Rowe – digital editing (1, 3, 5, 8–10)

== Chart performance ==
The album debuted at number 12 on U.S. Billboard Top Country Albums and number 68 on the U.S. Billboard 200, selling over 8,000 copies in its first week.

Chart (2010)	Peak position
U.S. Billboard 200	68
U.S. Billboard Top Country Albums	12
