= Girl Problems =

Studio album by Chris Lane
- Released: August 5, 2016
- Genre: Country
- Label: Big Loud
- Producer: Joey Moi

Chris Lane chronology
Fix (2015)	Girl Problems (2016)	Laps Around the Sun (2018)

Singles from Girl Problems
- 1. "Fix" Released: October 30, 2015; 2. "For Her" Released: August 29, 2016

Girl Problems is the second studio album by American country music singer Chris Lane. It was released on August 5, 2016 by Big Loud Records. Produced by Joey Moi, the album includes Lane's first No. 1 single, "Fix", his top 10 single, "For Her", as well as a cover of Mario's 2004 hit, "Let Me Love You".

== Commercial performance ==
The album debuted at number 55 on the Billboard 200 chart, and at number eight on the Top Country Albums chart, selling 6,200 copies in its first week. According to Nielsen Music Connect, the album has sold 230,000 copies in the US as of July 2018.

== Critical reception ==
Stephen Thomas Erlewine of AllMusic rated the album 3 out of 5 stars, comparing Lane's R&B influences to Thomas Rhett and Sam Hunt, while adding that "he navigates the lithe stylistic flourishes with ease, and the gloss of the record is appealing."

== Track listing ==
No.	Title	Writer(s)	Length
1.	"Fix"	Sarah Buxton; Jesse Frasure; Abe Stoklasa	3:10
2.	"For Her"	Kelly Archer; Buxton; Matt Dragstrem	3:32
3.	"Let Me Love You"	Shaffer Smith; Scott Storch	4:21
4.	"Who's It Gonna Be"	James "J-Hart" Abrahart; Nick Bailey; Kevin Fisher; Ryan Ogren	3:28
5.	"Back to Me"	Cary Barlowe; Rob Persaud; Josh Thompson	3:40
6.	"Maybe"	Jacob Hawkes; David Pramik; Charlie Snyder; Eben Wares	3:17
7.	"Her Own Kind of Beautiful"	Rodney Clawson; Barry Dean; Dragstrem	2:45
8.	"All the Time"	Abrahart; Jordan Evans; Chelcee Grimes; Taylor Parks; Tinashe Sibanda	3:30
9.	"Circles" (featuring Mackenzie Porter)	Steph Jones; Joey Moi; Danny Parker; Sno; Emily Warren	3:42
10.	"Saturday Night"	Ashley Gorley; Luke Laird; Shane McAnally	3:30
11.	"All About You"	Andy Albert; Chris Lane; Jordan Schmidt	3:08
12.	"Girl Problems"	Chris DeStefano; Gorley; Josh Kear	3:12
Total length:			41:15

== Personnel ==
Adapted from AllMusic

- Sarah Buxton - background vocals
- Dave Cohen - keyboards
- David Dorn - keyboards
- Matt Dragstrem - programming
- Jesse Frasure - keyboards, programming
- Wes Hightower - background vocals
- Charlie Judge - keyboards
- Chris Lane - lead vocals, background vocals
- Sid Menon - background vocals
- Joey Moi - electric guitar, keyboards, percussion, percussion programming, programming, background vocals
- Jamie Moore - keyboards
- Russ Pahl - pedal steel guitar
- Mackenzie Porter - featured vocals on "Circles"
- Danny Rader - acoustic guitar
- Adam Shoenfeld - electric guitar
- Jimmie Lee Sloas - bass guitar
- Bryan Sutton - dobro, acoustic guitar
- Ilya Toshinsky - banjo, bouzouki, acoustic guitar, electric guitar, mandolin

== Charts ==
Chart (2016)	Peak position
Canadian Albums (Billboard)	83
US Billboard 200	55
US Top Country Albums (Billboard)	8
US Independent Albums (Billboard)	5
