= For Her =

Single by Chris Lane

from the album Girl Problems
- Released: August 29, 2016
- Genre: Country
- Length: 3:32
- Label: Big Loud
- Songwriter(s): Kelly Archer; Sarah Buxton; Matt Dragstrem
- Producer(s): Joey Moi

Chris Lane singles chronology
"Fix" (2015)	"For Her" (2016)	"Take Back Home Girl" (2017)

"For Her" is a song recorded by American country music singer Chris Lane for his 2015 extended play, Fix. It was released to digital retailers by Big Loud Records on August 29, 2016 as the record's second single. It is also included on his second studio album, Girl Problems (2016). The song was written by Kelly Archer, Sarah Buxton, and Matt Dragstrem and produced by Joey Moi.

== Commercial performance ==
The song peaked at No. 17 on Billboard's Hot Country Songs for chart dated August 5, 2017. It has since become Lane's second top 10 on the Country Airplay chart, and his first #1 on the Canada Country chart. It has sold 780,000 copies in the United States as of July 2018.

== Music video ==
The music video was directed by TK McKamy and premiered in September 2016. It features a real-life proposal of marriage.

== Charts ==
=== Weekly charts ===
Chart (2016–2017)	Peak position
Canada Country (Billboard)	1
US Billboard Hot 100	92
US Country Airplay (Billboard)	10
US Hot Country Songs (Billboard)	17

=== Year-end charts ===
Chart (2017)	Position
Canada Country (Billboard)	18
US Country Airplay (Billboard)	49
US Hot Country Songs (Billboard)	30

== Certifications ==
Region	Certification	Certified units/sales
Canada (Music Canada)	Gold	40,000^{‡}
United States (RIAA)	Platinum	1,000,000^{‡}
^{‡} Sales+streaming figures based on certification alone.
