= Somebody Like You =

2002 single by Keith Urban

Single by Keith Urban

from the album Golden Road
- B-side: "If You Wanna Stay"
- Released: 23 July 2002
- Studio: The Sound Kitchen, Emerald Entertainment (Nashville, Tennessee); Hound's Ear (Franklin, Tennessee)
- Genre: Country rock
- Length: 5:23 (album version); 3:41 (radio edit)
- Label: Capitol Nashville
- Songwriters: John Shanks; Keith Urban
- Producers: Dann Huff; Keith Urban

Keith Urban singles chronology
"Where the Blacktop Ends" (2001)	"Somebody Like You" (2002)	"Raining on Sunday" (2003)

"Somebody Like You" is a song co-written and recorded by Australian country music singer Keith Urban. It was released in July 2002 as the first single from his third studio album, Golden Road (2002). The song became Urban's second number-one hit on the US Billboard Hot Country Singles & Tracks chart, spending six weeks at that position. The song also peaked at number 23 on the Billboard Hot 100 and reached number three in Canada. In December 2009, Billboard named the song as the number-one country song of the 2000s decade. In 2003, the song was remixed for the film How to Lose a Guy in 10 Days.

== Content ==
"Somebody Like You" is set in common time in the key of E major. The verses use a chord pattern of E-A-E-B-A-E, with a pattern of E-A-E-A-C♯m-F♯m^{7} on the chorus, and the lead vocal ranges from E_{3} to G♯_{4}.

== Commercial performance ==
"Somebody Like You" reached number one on the Billboard Hot Country Singles & Tracks (now the Hot Country Songs) chart dated for the week of 19 October 2002, holding that position for six weeks and spending 41 weeks on that chart. It also reached number 23 on the all-genre Billboard Hot 100 chart. In December 2009, Billboard ranked "Somebody Like You" as the number-one country song for the 2000s decade. The song was certified double platinum by the Recording Industry Association of America (RIAA) on 31 July 2019. As of September 2015, the song has sold 1.05 million copies in the US. Outside the US, "Somebody Like You" peaked at number three on the Canadian Singles Chart and was certified triple platinum in Australia in 2023.

== Music video ==
The song's music video was released to Country Music Television (CMT) on 7 August 2002. It was directed by Trey Fanjoy, who also directed the video for Keith Urban's late 2000/early 2001 single "But for the Grace of God".

== Track listings ==
Canadian CD single (2002)

1. "Somebody Like You" – 3:53
2. "If You Wanna Stay" – 4:27

European CD single (2005)

1. "Somebody Like You" – 3:57
2. "You Look Good in My Shirt" – 3:47
3. "You Are Not Alone Tonight" (acoustic) – 3:40
4. "Somebody Like You" (Sessions @ AOL performance) – 3:45

== Personnel ==
Personnel are lifted from the Golden Road liner notes.

- Keith Urban – lead vocals, background vocals, electric guitar, ganjo, EBow, cardboard box, guitar solo
- Tim Akers – keyboards
- Tom Bukovac – electric guitar
- Dann Huff – electric guitar
- Chris McHugh – drums, percussion
- Jimmie Lee Sloas – bass guitar
- Russell Terrell – background vocals

== Charts ==
=== Weekly charts ===
Weekly chart performance for "Somebody Like You"
Chart (2002)	Peak position
Canada (Nielsen SoundScan)	3
US Billboard Hot 100	23
US Hot Country Songs (Billboard)	1

=== Year-end charts ===
Year-end chart performance for "Somebody Like You"
Chart (2002)	Position
Canada (Nielsen SoundScan)	36
US Hot Country Singles & Tracks (Billboard)	14

Chart (2003)	Position
US Hot Country Singles & Tracks (Billboard)	34

== Certifications and sales ==
Region	Certification	Certified units/sales
Australia (ARIA)	4× Platinum	280,000^{‡}
New Zealand (RMNZ)	Platinum	30,000^{‡}
United Kingdom (BPI)	Silver	200,000^{‡}
United States (RIAA)	3× Platinum	1,050,000
^{‡} Sales+streaming figures based on certification alone.
