= I Don't Know About You =

Single by Chris Lane

from the album Laps Around the Sun
- Released: October 8, 2018
- Genre: Country
- Length: 3:27
- Label: Big Loud
- Songwriters: Ashley Gorley; Michael Hardy; Hunter Phelps; Jameson Rodgers
- Producer: Joey Moi

Chris Lane singles chronology
"Take Back Home Girl" (2017)	"I Don't Know About You" (2018)	"Big, Big Plans" (2019)

"I Don't Know About You" is a song recorded by American country music singer Chris Lane. It was released in 2018 as the second single from his second major-label album Laps Around the Sun. Ashley Gorley, Michael Hardy, Hunter Phelps, and Jameson Rodgers are the song's writers.

== Content and history ==
Taste of Country describes the song as a "slow jam" which "finds the singer walking into a bar to find a girl he's determined to get to know." It features a "rhythmic singing style" in which the song's narrator wants to get to know a woman more closely after encountering her in a bar.

== Commercial performance ==
The song was certified Gold by the RIAA on June 20, 2019, for half a million units in sales and streams. It has sold 175,000 copies in the United States as of January 2020. In 2022, it was certified triple platinum for 3,000,000 equivalent units.

== Charts ==
=== Weekly charts ===
Chart (2018–2019)	Peak position
Canada Hot 100 (Billboard)	85
Canada Country (Billboard)	1
US Billboard Hot 100	39
US Country Airplay (Billboard)	1
US Hot Country Songs (Billboard)	2
US Rolling Stone Top 100	66

=== Year-end charts ===
Chart (2019)	Position
US Country Airplay (Billboard)	14
US Hot Country Songs (Billboard)	14

== Certifications ==
Region	Certification	Certified units/sales
Canada (Music Canada)	2× Platinum	160,000^{‡}
United States (RIAA)	3× Platinum	3,000,000^{‡}
^{‡} Sales+streaming figures based on certification alone.
