= Laps Around the Sun (Chris Lane album) =

Studio album by Chris Lane
- Released: July 13, 2018
- Genre: Country
- Length: 45:41
- Label: Big Loud
- Producer: Joey Moi

Chris Lane chronology
Girl Problems (2016)	Laps Around the Sun (2018)

Singles from Laps Around the Sun
- 1. "Take Back Home Girl" Released: September 29, 2017; 2. "I Don't Know About You" Released: October 8, 2018

Laps Around The Sun is the third studio album by American country music artist Chris Lane. It was released on July 13, 2018, the album is published via Big Loud Records.

== Content ==
The lead single to the album is "Take Back Home Girl", a duet with Tori Kelly which has charted within top 15 of Hot Country Songs and Country Airplay. This song, along with "All the Right Problems" and "Old Flame", previously appeared on an EP titled Take Back Home which was released digitally in late 2017. Of the album's content, Lane said, "My goal was to make sure anyone who hears this album finds a song they can relate to. I hope I accomplished that." Like his previous album, it is produced by Joey Moi, co-owner of the Big Loud label.

== Track listing ==
No.	Title	Writer(s)	Length
1.	"Take Back Home Girl" (featuring Tori Kelly)	David Garcia; Hillary Lindsey; Josh Miller	3:32
2.	"Fishin'"	Matt Dragstrem; Brian Kelley; Josh Thompson	2:42
3.	"Drunk People"	Zach Abend; Michael Hardy; James McNair	3:17
4.	"I Don't Know About You"	Ashley Gorley; Hardy; Hunter Phelps; Jameson Rodgers	3:27
5.	"Laps Around the Sun"	Bobby Huff; Chris Lane; Ernest Keith Smith	3:32
6.	"Bad Girl"	Rodney Clawson; Dragstrem; Thompson	3:32
7.	"New Phone, Who's This"	Rhett Akins; Marv Green; Dragstrem	2:44
8.	"All the Right Problems"	Clawson; Dragstrem; Thompson	2:52
9.	"Life Goes On"	Nate Cyphert; Miller; Ben West	3:27
10.	"Sun Kiss You"	busbee; Ryan Hurd; Jon Nite	3:00
11.	"Number One"	Huff; Smith; Brad Warren; Brett Warren	3:42
12.	"Old Flame"	Clawson; Dragstrem; Thompson	2:49
13.	"Without You" (featuring Danielle Bradbery)	Ben Burgess; Ross Copperman; Emily Weisband	3:14
14.	"Hero"	Miller	3:51
Total length:			45:41

== Charts ==
=== Weekly charts ===
Chart (2018)	Peak position
Canadian Albums (Billboard)	51
US Billboard 200	83
US Top Country Albums (Billboard)	8

=== Year-end charts ===
Chart (2018)	Position
US Top Country Albums (Billboard)	86
Chart (2019)	Position
US Top Country Albums (Billboard)	56

== Certifications ==
Certifications for Laps Around the Sun
Region	Certification	Certified units/sales
Canada (Music Canada)	Gold	40,000^{‡}
United States (RIAA)	Gold	500,000^{‡}
^{‡} Sales+streaming figures based on certification alone.
