= Dale Daniel =

American singer-songwriter

- Born: Lisa Dale Daniel
- Origin: Kentucky, U.S.
- Genre: Country
- Occupation: Singer-songwriter
- Instrument: Vocals
- Years active: 1993-1994
- Label: BNA

Lisa Dale Daniel is an American country music artist. She has recorded one studio album, Luck of Our Own. Daniel is the daughter of songwriter Naomi Martin, whose credits include the Grammy nominated "Let's Take the Long Way Around the World" by Ronnie Milsap and "My Eyes Can Only See as Far as You" by Charley Pride. Daniel and Martin also co-wrote the track "Someone to Call Me Darling" on Lorrie Morgan's 1992 album Watch Me. She also co-penned a Barbara Mandrell and Lee Greenwood duet, “I’d Give Anything to Be Everything to You”. which also featured Daniel on background vocals.

Daniel made her first recording at age 14, and by 1991, she had joined Moe Bandy's band. Signed to BNA Records (then known as BNA Entertainment) in 1993, she released her Jerry Crutchfield-produced debut album Luck of Our Own in 1994. Daniel still continues to write and live in Nashville. The title track on Daniel's album “Luck of Our Own” was covered by Keith Urban on his 1999 self-titled album.

== Discography ==
=== Albums ===
Title	Album details
Luck of Our Own	Release date: 1993; Label: BNA Records; Format: CD, cassette

=== Singles ===
Year	Single	Album
1993	"Coming Back to Haunt Me"	Luck of Our Own
1994	"You Gave Her Your Name"	Luck of Our Own

=== Music videos ===
Year	Video	Director
1993	"Coming Back to Haunt Me"	Steven Goldmann
1994	"You Gave Her Your Name"	Michael Merriman
