= It's a Love Thing =

Single by Keith Urban

from the album Keith Urban
- Released: May 27, 1999
- Recorded: 1999
- Genre: Country
- Length: 3:41
- Label: Capitol Nashville
- Songwriters: Keith Urban; Monty Powell
- Producers: Keith Urban; Matt Rollings

Keith Urban singles chronology
"Got It Bad" (1991)	"It's a Love Thing" (1999)	"Your Everything" (2000)

"It's a Love Thing" is a song co-written and recorded by Australian country music artist Keith Urban. It was released in May 1999 as the first single from his first American self-titled album. The song peaked at number 18 on the U.S. Billboard Hot Country Singles & Tracks chart. Urban wrote this song with Monty Powell.

== Music video ==
The music video was directed by Thom Oliphant and premiered on CMT on May 31, 1999, during The CMT Delivery Room.

== Chart performance ==
"It's a Love Thing" debuted at number 73 on the Billboard Hot Country Singles & Tracks charts during the week of August 28, 1999, and peaked at number 18 in 2000, becoming Urban's lowest-charting single to date. The song is his first single to not enter the Billboard Hot 100, and his first to miss the Top Ten on the Billboard Hot Country Singles & Tracks chart. It would also be his only single to miss the Top Ten until 2018, when "Female" reached number 12.

Chart (1999–2000)	Peak position
Canada Country Singles (RPM)	25
US Bubbling Under Hot 100 (Billboard)	5
US Hot Country Songs (Billboard)	18
