= Fix (Chris Lane song) =

2015 Single by Chris Lane

Single by Chris Lane

from the album Girl Problems
- Released: October 30, 2015
- Genre: Country pop
- Length: 3:09
- Label: Big Loud
- Songwriters: Sarah Buxton; Jesse Frasure; Abe Stoklasa
- Producer: Joey Moi

Chris Lane singles chronology
"Broken Windshield View" (2014)	"Fix" (2015)	"For Her" (2016)

"Fix" is a song recorded by American country music singer Chris Lane for his 2015 extended play of the same name. It was released to digital retailers by Big Loud Records on October 30, 2015 as the record's lead single. It is also included on his second studio album, Girl Problems, which was released on August 5, 2016. The song was written by Sarah Buxton, Jesse Frasure, and Abe Stoklasa and produced by Joey Moi.

"Fix" peaked at number one on the Billboard Country Airplay chart, giving Lane his first number-one hit overall. It also charted at numbers 10 and 65 on both the Hot Country Songs and Hot 100 charts respectively. It also charted in Canada, peaking at number 8 on the Canada Country chart and number 100 on the Canadian Hot 100 chart. The single has been certified Platinum by both the Recording Industry Association of America (RIAA) and Music Canada.

The accompanying music video for the song was directed by TK McKamy.

== Background ==
"Fix" was written in February 2015 with the intention of co-writer Abe Stoklasa recording it for his own album. However, after the song was pitched to publishers, the newly-formed independent label Big Loud Records' manager-partner Seth England optioned the song for the label's flagship artist Chris Lane. The song was "countrified" for Lane, including lyrical changes such as the censoring of "good shit," though it retained some of the dance music and blue-eyed soul influences of the demo.

The song, released in October 2015, is the first release by Big Loud Records which was formed in mid-2015. Chris Lane performed the song at the Grand Ole Opry on February 20, 2016.

== Commercial performance ==
The song debuted on the Country Airplay chart in December 2015 at number 50, then debuted on the Hot Country Songs at number 44 two weeks later. The song reached number one on the Country Airplay chart in August 2016, which is the first number one on the chart for Chris Lane. The song has sold 291,000 copies in the US as of August 2016. It was certified platinum by the Recording Industry Association of America (RIAA) on September 28, 2020.

== Music video ==
A lyric video directed by Lloyd Aur Norman premiered on Lane's Vevo account on October 30, 2015. The official music video was directed by TK McKamy and premiered January 6, 2016.

== Charts and certifications ==
=== Weekly charts ===
Chart (2015–2016)	Peak position
Canada Hot 100 (Billboard)	100
Canada Country (Billboard)	8
US Billboard Hot 100	65
US Country Airplay (Billboard)	1
US Hot Country Songs (Billboard)	10

=== Year end charts ===
Chart (2016)	Position
US Country Airplay (Billboard)	4
US Hot Country Songs (Billboard)	28

=== Certifications ===
Region	Certification	Certified units/sales
Canada (Music Canada)	Platinum	80,000^{‡}
United States (RIAA)	Platinum	1,000,000^{‡} / 291,000
^{‡} Sales+streaming figures based on certification alone.

== Release history ==
Country	Date	Format	Label	Ref.
Worldwide	October 30, 2015	Digital download	Big Loud	
United States	December 7, 2015	Country radio	Big Loud	
