= Broken Windshield View =

Single by Chris Lane
- Released: June 10, 2014
- Recorded: 2014
- Genre: Country
- Length: 3:14
- Label: Big Loud Mountain
- Songwriter(s): Rodney Clawson; Shane Minor; David Lee Murphy
- Producer(s): Joey Moi

Chris Lane singles chronology
"Broken Windshield View" (2014)	"Fix" (2015)

"Broken Windshield View" is a song recorded by American country music singer Chris Lane. It was released in June 2014 as his debut single.

== Critical reception ==
Markos Papadatos of Digital Journal gave the song four stars out of five, saying that it is "reminiscent of Florida Georgia Line meets Dierks Bentley". He wrote that "it has a great deal of energy, and it is fun and radio-friendly, with a rock vibe to it." Taste of Country wrote that Lane "shows vocal range" on the song and called his style "less aggressive than that of [Florida Georgia Line]."

== Music video ==
The music video was directed by Robert Hales and premiered in September 2014.

== Charts ==
Chart (2014)	Peak position
US Hot Country Songs (Billboard)	45
US Country Airplay (Billboard)	56
