= Big, Big Plans =

2019 song by Chris Lane

Single by Chris Lane
- Released: June 28, 2019
- Genre: Country
- Length: 3:07
- Label: Big Loud
- Songwriters: Chris Lane; Ernest Keith Smith; Jacob Durrett
- Producer: Joey Moi

Chris Lane singles chronology
"I Don't Know About You" (2018)	"Big, Big Plans" (2019)	"Fill Them Boots" (2021)

Music video
- "Big, Big Plans" (Wedding Video) on YouTube

"Big, Big Plans" is a song recorded by American country music singer Chris Lane. It was released in June 2019. Lane co-wrote the song with Ernest Keith Smith and Jacob Durrett.

== Background ==
Lane shared about the song’s creation, inspired by his wife Lauren Bushnell's relationship and proposal. He said: “You never know if a song personal to your life is going to react in that way, but I’m thankful it did,” and “Now I see people making it their own story, using the song for their big moment as well. That’s really special.”

== Music video ==
There are two videos for the song. "Video for Lauren" was uploaded on June 19, 2019, including home video of the couple, and the proposal which took place in the backyard of Bushnell's family's Oregon home.

"Wedding Video" was uploaded on November 13, 2019, directed by Justin Clough and filmed on-site Nashville’s 14TENN, which Lane and Lauren became husband and wife. The video was filmed on October 25, 2019, and showed clips from their wedding ceremony.

== Charts ==
=== Weekly charts ===
Chart (2019–2020)	Peak position
Australia Country Hot 50 (TMN)	26
Canada Hot 100 (Billboard)	73
Canada Country (Billboard)	1
US Billboard Hot 100	42
US Country Airplay (Billboard)	1
US Hot Country Songs (Billboard)	3

=== Year-end charts ===
Chart (2020)	Position
US Country Airplay (Billboard)	53
US Hot Country Songs (Billboard)	58

Chart (2021)	Position
US Country Airplay (Billboard)	51
US Hot Country Songs (Billboard)	73

== Certifications ==
Region	Certification	Certified units/sales
Canada (Music Canada)	Platinum	80,000^{‡}
United States (RIAA)	2× Platinum	2,000,000^{‡}
^{‡} Sales+streaming figures based on certification alone.
