= Pieces (Gary Allan song) =

Single by Gary Allan

from the album Set You Free
- Released: February 25, 2013
- Recorded: 2013
- Genre: Country
- Length: 3:24
- Label: MCA Nashville
- Songwriters: Gary Allan; Odie Blackmon; Sarah Buxton
- Producer: Jay Joyce

Gary Allan singles chronology
"Every Storm (Runs Out of Rain)" (2012)	"Pieces" (2013)	"It Ain't the Whiskey" (2013)

"Pieces" is a song co-written and recorded by American country music artist Gary Allan. It was released in February 2013 as the second single from his 2013 album Set You Free. Allan wrote the song with Odie Blackmon and Sarah Buxton.

== Content ==
Co-writer Odie Blackmon told Roughstock that "[Buxton] had a little piece of the verse and melody and the word 'pieces.' We all started talking about it and what it meant to us. None of us are young folks any more. We've all lived some life and we were talking about the pieces of our lives ... all the different pieces that has [sic] brought us to where we are today, whether they were good or bad pieces."

== Critical reception ==
The song has received mixed reception. Billy Dukes of Taste of Country gave the song two and a half stars out of five, writing that "the production on ‘Pieces’ lacks some of the creativity he’s displayed over the last 16 years" and "the chorus is hooky and cute, but not especially unique." Dan Milliken of Country Universe gave the song a B− grade, saying that "even on this introspectish throwaway […] his combination of technical and interpretive skill […] feels so natural that you wonder why every other singer can’t achieve it." Bobby Peacock of Roughstock was more positive, saying that "it seems that his songs are taking on comparatively more upbeat messages" and "Gary's raw voice makes it sound exactly like he knows what he's singing about." He gave the song 4 out of 5 stars.

== Music video ==
The music video was directed by Wes Edwards and premiered in June 2013.

== Chart performance ==
"Pieces" debuted at number 59 on the U.S. Billboard Country Airplay chart for the week of February 23, 2013. It also debuted at number 45 on the U.S. Billboard Hot Country Songs chart for the week of April 6, 2013. It also debuted at number 23 on the U.S. Billboard Bubbling Under Hot 100 Singles chart for the week of May 18, 2013.

Chart (2013)	Peak position
Canada Country (Billboard)	34
US Bubbling Under Hot 100 (Billboard)	5
US Hot Country Songs (Billboard)	29
US Country Airplay (Billboard)	18

=== Year-end charts ===
Chart (2013)	Position
US Country Airplay (Billboard)	73
US Hot Country Songs (Billboard)	82
