= Keith Urban (1999 album) =

Studio album by Keith Urban
- Released: 19 October 1999
- Recorded: 1999
- Studios: Emerald Sound (Nashville, Tennessee); Javelina (Nashville, Tennessee); Sound Kitchen (Franklin, Tennessee); Work Station (Nashville, Tennessee)
- Genre: Country
- Length: 46:34
- Label: Capitol Nashville
- Producers: Matt Rollings; Keith Urban

Keith Urban chronology
The Ranch (1997)	Keith Urban (1999)	Golden Road (2002)

Singles from Keith Urban
- 1. "It's a Love Thing" Released: 27 May 1999; 2. "Your Everything" Released: 2 May 2000; 3. "But for the Grace of God" Released: 28 November 2000; 4. "Where the Blacktop Ends" Released: 9 April 2001

Professional ratings
Review scores
Source	Rating
AllMusic	3/5 stars

Keith Urban (also known as Keith Urban II) is the second studio album by Australian country music artist Keith Urban. It was released on 19 October 1999 via Capitol Nashville. It was nominated at the 2000 ARIA Music Awards for Best Country Album, but lost to Troy Cassar-Daley for Big River.

Before this album, Urban recorded a self-titled album in Australia in 1991, and another in the US with his short-lived backing band the Ranch. The album is Urban's breakthrough album, as it produced four singles on the Billboard Hot Country Songs chart. In order of release, the singles were "It's a Love Thing" (number 18), "Your Everything" (number 4), "But for the Grace of God" (number 1), and "Where the Blacktop Ends" (number 3). It has sold 980,000 copies in the U.S., according to Nielsen SoundScan. The track "A Little Luck of Our Own" was originally titled "Luck of Our Own" as first recorded by American singer and songwriter Dale Daniel on her 1993 album of the same name. This is Urban's only album to not be produced by Dann Huff, who has produced all his albums since. While his contemporaries, Tim McGraw and Kenny Chesney, started with a neotraditional country sound, Urban had a crossover-friendly country pop sound from the very beginning.

== Track listing ==
No.	Title	Writer(s)	Length
1.	"It's a Love Thing"	Keith Urban; Monty Powell	3:41
2.	"Where the Blacktop Ends"	Steve Wariner; Allen Shamblin	3:00
3.	"But for the Grace of God"	Urban; Charlotte Caffey; Jane Wiedlin	4:33
4.	"Your Everything"	Chris Lindsey; Bob Regan	4:11
5.	"I Wanna Be Your Man (Forever)"	Urban	3:09
6.	"A Little Luck of Our Own"	Gary Burr; Dale Daniel	3:22
7.	"You're the Only One"	Urban; Michael Weinstein; Stevie J.	4:54
8.	"If You Wanna Stay"	Urban	4:29
9.	"Don't Shut Me Out"	Urban	3:54
10.	"Out on My Own"	Urban; Vernon Rust	4:56
11.	"Rollercoaster" (instrumental)	Urban; Matt Rollings	2:54
12.	"I Thought You Knew"	Urban; Rollings; Skip Ewing	3:51
Total length:			46:54

== Personnel ==
- David Angell – violin
- Bruce Bouton – pedal steel guitar, pedabro
- John Catchings – cello
- Steve Conn – accordion
- Eric Darken – percussion
- David Davidson – violin
- Stuart Duncan – fiddle
- Tabitha Fair – background vocals
- Jerry Flowers – background vocals
- Paul Franklin – pedal steel guitar
- Aubrey Haynie – fiddle, mandolin
- Kim Keyes – background vocals
- Chris McHugh – drums, drum loops, percussion
- Emily Robison – background vocals
- Matt Rollings – organ, piano, synthesizer, background vocals
- Martie Seidel – background vocals
- Keith Urban – banjo, acoustic guitar, electric guitar, electric sitar, slide guitar, lead vocals, background vocals
- Steve Wariner – acoustic guitar, electric guitar, background vocals
- Biff Watson – acoustic guitar
- Kristin Wilkinson – programming, string arrangements, synthesizer programming, viola
- Glenn Worf – bass guitar
- Curtis Young – background vocals

== Charts ==
Keith Urban debuted at number 145 on the US Billboard 200 and number 17 on the Top Country Albums. In December 2003, Keith Urban was certified Platinum by the RIAA.

=== Weekly charts ===
Weekly chart performance for Keith Urban
Chart (1999–2001)	Peak position
Australian Albums (ARIA)	90
Canadian Country Albums (RPM)	27
US Billboard 200	145
US Top Country Albums (Billboard)	17
US Heatseekers Albums (Billboard)	4

=== Year-end charts ===
Year-end chart performance for Keith Urban
Chart (2000)	Position
US Top Country Albums (Billboard)	47
Chart (2001)	Position
Canadian Country Albums (Nielsen SoundScan)	58
US Top Country Albums (Billboard)	28

== Certifications ==
Region	Certification	Certified units/sales
Australia (ARIA)	Gold	35,000^{^}
United States (RIAA)	Platinum	1,000,000^{^}
^{^} Shipments figures based on certification alone.
