= Take Back Home Girl =

Single by Chris Lane featuring Tori Kelly

from the album Laps Around the Sun
- Released: September 29, 2017
- Genre: Country
- Length: 3:31
- Label: Big Loud
- Songwriters: Hillary Lindsey; David Garcia; Josh Miller
- Producer: Joey Moi

Chris Lane singles chronology
"For Her" (2016)	"Take Back Home Girl" (2017)	"I Don't Know About You" (2018)

Tori Kelly singles chronology
"I'll Find You" (2017)	"Take Back Home Girl" (2017)	"Help Us To Love" (2018)

Music Video
- Take Back Home Girl on YouTube

"Take Back Home Girl" is a duet song recorded by American country music singer Chris Lane and American pop singer Tori Kelly. Lane's third release for Big Loud Records, it served as the lead single from his second studio album, Laps Around the Sun (2018). It was written by Hillary Lindsey, David Garcia and Josh Miller. "Take Back Home Girl" peaked at numbers eight and 12 on the Billboard Country Airplay and Hot Country Songs charts respectively. It also reached number 55 on the Hot 100 chart. The song was certified 2× Platinum by the Recording Industry Association of America (RIAA), and has sold 150,000 units as of July 2018. It achieved similar chart success in Canada, reaching number three on the Canada Country chart and number 79 on the Canadian Hot 100. It was certified 2× Platinum by Music Canada. The accompanying music video for the single was directed by Justin Clough, where Lane and Kelly play a couple going around the former's hometown. For promotion, both artists performed the song live on The Tonight Show with Jimmy Fallon and NBC's Today.

== Background and development ==
"Take Back Home Girl" was written by Hillary Lindsey, David Garcia and Josh Miller. The song is a "soulful ode to those girls you can bring home to mom", and Rolling Stone described it as a "grooving, R&B-centric country track." Lane said when asked for an artist with whom he would like to record a duet, Tori Kelly was his first choice. Kelly said that, after being sent a demo of the song by her manager, she liked it so much that she was willing to record duet vocals on it before she had even been told with which artist she would be collaborating.

== Commercial performance ==
"Take Back Home Girl" debuted at number 33 on the Billboard Hot Country Songs chart for the week of October 21, 2017, and number 57 on the Country Airplay chart the next week. It reached number 12 on the Hot Country Songs chart dated July 28, 2018, and number eight on the Country Airplay chart the week of August 18, staying for 46 and 45 weeks respectively. It also debuted at number 92 on the Hot 100 chart dated April 14, before leaving the next week. On the week of June 16, the song reappeared on the chart at number 100 and moved up to number 99 the week of June 23 before leaving the week after. It made its second reappearance at number 98 on the week of July 7 and peaked at number 55 the week of August 11, staying on the chart for twelve weeks. It has sold 1.2M equivalents in the United States as of January 2018.

In Canada, the song debuted at number 46 on the Canada Country chart dated January 27, 2018, and peaked at number three the week of July 21, staying on the chart for 30 weeks. It also debuted at number 81 on the Canadian Hot 100 chart dated July 21. It peaked at number 79 the week of July 28 and dropped nineteen spots to number 98 the week after before leaving the chart completely. The track was certified double platinum by Music Canada in Canada on February 24, 2020.

== Music video ==
Justin Clough directed the song's music video, which premiered in November 2017. The video features Lane and Kelly playing a couple, where the former takes the latter to his hometown, going through the streets, having a homecooked meal with his mom and dad, and playing around a football field.

== Live performances ==
Lane and Kelly first performed "Take Back Home Girl" live on The Tonight Show Starring Jimmy Fallon on April 2, 2018. The duo performed it again on NBC's Today on July 17.

== Charts ==
=== Weekly charts ===
Chart (2017–2018)	Peak position
Canada Hot 100 (Billboard)	79
Canada Country (Billboard)	3
US Billboard Hot 100	55
US Country Airplay (Billboard)	8
US Hot Country Songs (Billboard)	12

=== Year-end charts ===
Chart (2018)	Position
US Country Airplay (Billboard)	21
US Hot Country Songs (Billboard)	12

== Certifications ==
Region	Certification	Certified units/sales
Canada (Music Canada)	2× Platinum	160,000^{‡}
United States (RIAA)	2× Platinum	2,000,000^{‡}
^{‡} Sales+streaming figures based on certification alone.
