= Golden Road (album) =

2002 studio album by Keith Urban

Studio album by Keith Urban
- Released: 8 October 2002
- Recorded: Late 2001 - Mid 2002
- Genres: Country; rock; bluegrass; pop
- Length: 53:40
- Label: Capitol Nashville
- Producers: Dann Huff; Keith Urban

Keith Urban chronology
Keith Urban (1999)	Golden Road (2002)	Be Here (2004)

Singles from Golden Road
- 1. "Somebody Like You" Released: 23 July 2002; 2. "Raining on Sunday" Released: 21 January 2003; 3. "Who Wouldn't Wanna Be Me" Released: 8 July 2003; 4. "You'll Think of Me" Released: 8 December 2003

Professional ratings
Review scores
Source	Rating
AllMusic	3.5/5 stars

Golden Road is the third studio album by Australian country music singer Keith Urban. It was released on 8 October 2002 via Capitol Records Nashville. The album includes the singles "Somebody Like You", "Raining on Sunday", "Who Wouldn't Wanna Be Me", and "You'll Think of Me". This was Urban's first album to be produced by Dann Huff, who has produced all of his albums since.

== Content ==
This album produced four singles: "Somebody Like You", "Raining on Sunday", "Who Wouldn't Wanna Be Me", and "You'll Think of Me", which all made it to the Top 10 on the U.S. Billboard Hot Country Songs chart. "Somebody Like You", "Who Wouldn't Wanna Be Me", and "You'll Think of Me" all reached number one, while "Raining on Sunday" peaked at number three. "Raining on Sunday" was originally recorded by Radney Foster on the 1998 album See What You Want to See, with a backing vocal from Darius Rucker of Hootie & the Blowfish. "Jeans On" is a cover of a Lord David Dundas song.

The song "You Look Good in My Shirt" was originally slated to be the album's fifth single; however, Capitol Nashville instead chose to release a single from a new album; despite its withdrawal, the song charted at number 60 from unsolicited airplay as an album cut. Urban re-recorded the song in 2008 for a re-issue of his compilation album Greatest Hits: 18 Kids and released that version as a single that same year. The re-recorded version was a number-one single in 2008.

Urban co-produced tracks 1, 3, 5, 7, 10, and 11 with Dann Huff, and he produced the rest of the album all by himself.

== Commercial performance ==
Golden Road debuted at number eleven on the US Billboard 200 and number two on the BillboardTop Country Albums chart, selling 66,500 copies in its first week. As of September 2004, the album has sold 1.8 million copies in the US. On 22 September 2005, the album was certified triple platinum by the Recording Industry Association of America (RIAA) for sales of over three million copies in the United States.

== Track listing ==
No.	Title	Writer(s)	Length
1.	"Somebody Like You"	Keith Urban; John Shanks	5:23
2.	"Who Wouldn't Wanna Be Me"	Urban; Monty Powell	4:15
3.	"Whenever I Run"	Urban; Shanks; Shelly Peiken	3:39
4.	"What About Me"	Urban; Rodney Crowell	3:52
5.	"You'll Think of Me"	Darrell Brown; Dennis Matkosky; Ty Lacy	4:53
6.	"Jeans On"	Lord David Dundas; Roger Greenaway	3:33
7.	"You Look Good in My Shirt"	Mark Nesler; Tony Martin; Tom Shapiro	3:47
8.	"You're Not Alone Tonight"	Urban	3:31
9.	"You Won"	Urban; Crowell	5:21
10.	"Song for Dad"	Urban	3:56
11.	"Raining on Sunday"	Brown; Radney Foster	4:45
12.	"You're Not My God"	Urban; Paul Jefferson	4:14
13.	"One Chord Song" (hidden track)	Urban	2:13
Total length:			53:40

== Personnel ==
Adapted from Golden Road liner notes.

=== Musicians ===
- Tim Akers – keyboards (1, 3, 9, 12), Hammond B-3 organ (8)
- Tom Bukovac – electric guitar (1, 3, 5, 7–12)
- Matt Chamberlain – drums (3, 5, 7, 11), drum loop (3)
- Eric Darken – percussion (3, 5, 7, 10, 11)
- Dan Dugmore – electric guitar (3, 5, 11), steel guitar (3)
- Jerry Flowers – background vocals (12)
- Aubrey Haynie – fiddle (10)
- John Hobbs – keyboards (4, 12), piano (8)
- Dann Huff – electric guitar (1)
- Scotty Huff – background vocals (11)
- Chris McHugh – drums (1, 2, 4, 6, 8, 9, 10, 12), percussion (1, 2, 4, 6, 8, 9, 10, 12)
- Jason Mowery – mandolin (2), Dobro (4, 6, 9)
- Steve Nathan – keyboards (3, 5, 7, 10, 11)
- Monty Powell – background vocals (2)
- Jimmie Lee Sloas – bass guitar (all tracks except 10)
- Russell Terrell – background vocals (1, 5, 7, 8, 10)
- Keith Urban – vocals; background vocals (all tracks), electric guitar (all tracks), ganjo (1, 2, 4, 6, 9), EBow (1, 3), cardboard box (1), acoustic guitar (3, 9, 12), piano (3), producer (all tracks)
- Glenn Worf – bass guitar (10)

=== String section on track 10 ===
Performed by the Nashville String Machine; Carl Gorodetzky, concert master

- Carl Gorodetzky, Pam Sixfin, Alan Umstead, Mary Kathryn Vanosdale – violins
- Kris Wilkinson, Gary Vanosdale – violas
- Bob Mason, Carol Rabinowitz – cellos
- Phillip Cooper – string recording assistant
- Ronn Huff – string arranger and conductor
- Brent King – string recording
- Jeff Sochor – string recording assistant

=== Technical ===
- Jeff Balding – recording
- Drew Bollman – recording assistant
- Joanna Carter – art direction
- Rodney Dawson – mixing assistant
- Tony Green – mixing assistant
- Mike "Frog" Griffith – production coordination
- Jed Hackett – recording assistant
- Robert Hadley – mastering
- Mark Hagen – additional recording
- Dann Huff – producer (tracks 1, 3, 5, 7, 10, 11)
- Joan Pont Lezica – photography
- Justin Niebank – recording, mixing
- J.R. Rodriguez – mixing assistant
- Christopher Rowe – digital editing
- Doug Sax – mastering
- Steve Short – mixing assistant

== Charts ==
=== Weekly charts ===
Chart (2002–04)	Peak position
Australian Albums (ARIA)	29
Norwegian Albums (VG-lista)	27
Swedish Albums (Sverigetopplistan)	58
US Billboard 200	11
US Top Country Albums (Billboard)	2

=== Year-end charts ===
Chart (2002)	Position
Canadian Country Albums (Nielsen SoundScan)	17
US Top Country Albums (Billboard)	49
Chart (2003)	Position
US Billboard 200	97
US Top Country Albums (Billboard)	13
Chart (2004)	Position
US Billboard 200	53
US Top Country Albums (Billboard)	7

=== Singles ===
Year	Single	Peak chart positions						
Year	Single	US Country	US	US AC	US Adult	US Pop	AUS	UK
2002	"Somebody Like You"	1	23	—	—	—	—	—
2003	"Raining on Sunday"	3	38	—	—	—	79	—
2003	"Who Wouldn't Wanna Be Me"	1	30	—	—	—	—	—
2004	"You'll Think of Me"	1	24	2	6	38	—	88
"—" denotes releases that did not chart

== Certifications ==
Region	Certification	Certified units/sales
Australia (ARIA)	Platinum	70,000^{^}
Canada (Music Canada)	2× Platinum	200,000^{^}
United States (RIAA)	3× Platinum	3,000,000^{^}
^{^} Shipments figures based on certification alone.
