= Outside My Window =

Single by Sarah Buxton

from the album Sarah Buxton
- Released: June 29, 2009
- Genre: Country
- Length: 3:46
- Label: Lyric Street
- Songwriters: Gary Burr, Sarah Buxton, Mark Hudson, Victoria Shaw
- Producer: Sarah Buxton

Sarah Buxton singles chronology
"Space'" (2008)	"Outside My Window" (2009)

Music video
- "Outside My Window" at CMT.com

"Outside My Window" is a song co-written and recorded by American country music artist Sarah Buxton. The song was released in June 2009 as the lead-off single from her self-titled debut album, which was released in February 2010. It has since become Buxton's second Top 30 hit on the U.S. Billboard Hot Country Songs chart, as well as the highest-charting single of her career. Buxton wrote this song with Victoria Shaw, Gary Burr and Mark Hudson.

== Content ==
"Outside My Window" is an up-tempo country pop song, backed primarily by electric guitar with steel guitar fills. The song's female narrator describes the positive things she sees "outside [her] window," which brighten up her day.

== Critical reception ==
The song has received mixed reception from music critics. Matt Bjorke of Roughstock reviewed the song favorably and referring to it as Buxton's "biggest shot at radio stardom yet." He described the song as "a Martina McBride-like optimistic ballad", as well as "a hook-y, sing-a-long to play for women this summer." Karlie Justus of Engine 145 gave the song a thumbs down, finding fault in the song's "strange production choices" and the chorus' "long mishmash of feel-good staples, which underscores its 'written by committee' feel." She thought that the verses were well written, and compared Buxton's sound to the likes of SHeDAISY, Deana Carter, and Julianne Hough. Kevin John Coyne of Country Universe gave the song a C rating, noting that while her voice is "distinctive and interesting," it is crowded out by "layers of backing instruments and vocalists," which result in her "sound[ing] like any one of the countless 21st century country acts who have to put all their effort into getting close enough to being on key for auto-tune to fix it."

== Music video ==
The music video, which was directed by co-writer Mark Hudson, premiered on CMT on July 9, 2009. The video shows Buxton outside in the woods, playing her acoustic guitar, while experiencing events portrayed in the song lyrics. Props for the video include a cut-out window that is held in front of Buxton as she looks through it, noticing a couple kissing among other things. Buxton revealed that the video was homemade and with a budget of $80.

== Chart performance ==
"Outside My Window" debuted at number 57 on the U.S. Billboard Hot Country Songs chart in July 2009. The song was a minor Top 30 on the U.S. Billboard Hot Country Songs chart, reaching a peak of number 23 in early 2010.

Chart (2009–2010)	Peak position
US Hot Country Songs (Billboard)	23
US Billboard Bubbling Under Hot 100	7
