= Everybody (Keith Urban song) =

Single by Keith Urban

from the album Love, Pain & the Whole Crazy Thing
- Released: September 18, 2007
- Recorded: 2006
- Genre: Country
- Length: 5:33 (album version); 3:57 (radio edit)
- Label: Capitol Nashville
- Songwriters: Richard Marx; Keith Urban
- Producers: Keith Urban; Dann Huff

Keith Urban singles chronology
"I Told You So" (2007)	"Everybody" (2007)	"In God's Hands" (2008)

"Everybody" is a song co-written and recorded by Australian country music artist Keith Urban. It was released in September 2007 as the fourth and final single from his 2006 album Love, Pain & the Whole Crazy Thing. The song peaked at number 5 on the US Billboard Hot Country Songs charts in early 2008. Urban wrote this song with Richard Marx.

== Content ==
"Everybody" is a mid-tempo ballad that Urban co-wrote with Richard Marx. In it, the male narrator addresses a female who is escaping her relationship ("And the only thing that you've ever known is to run") and tries asking her to stay ("Everybody needs somebody sometimes").

== Critical reception ==
Jordan Levin and Howard Cohen of The Miami Herald called the song "formulaic," and Keith Groller of The Morning Call said that it was "ultra-sappy."

== Music video ==
The music video was directed by Chris Hicky, and premiered on CMT on September 22, 2007.

== Personnel ==
As listed in liner notes.

- Keith Urban – lead and backing vocals, lead guitar, acoustic guitar, EBow
- Beth Beeson – french horn
- Tom Bukovac – rhythm guitar
- Eric Darken – percussion
- Erin Horner – french horn
- Dann Huff – rhythm guitar
- Chris McHugh – drums
- Tim Lauer – piano, synthesizer
- Jimmie Lee Sloas – bass guitar
- Joy Worland – french horn

String section

- Carl Gorodetzky, Pam Sixfin, Conni Ellisor, Alan Umstead, David Davidson, Cathy Umstead, Cate Myer, Karen Winkelmann, Mary Kathryn Vanosdale, David Angell – violins
- Kris Wilkinson, Monisa Angell, Gary Vanosdale – violas
- Larry Corbett, Carole Rabinowitz, Anthony LaMarchina – cellos

== Chart positions ==
Chart (2007–2008)	Peak position
Canada Country (Billboard)	2
Canada Hot 100 (Billboard)	71
US Billboard Hot 100	64
US Hot Country Songs (Billboard)	5

=== Year-end charts ===
Chart (2008)	Position
US Country Songs (Billboard)	47

== Cover versions ==
=== Richard Marx version ===
Richard Marx recorded his own version of the song and released it as the lead single from the European edition of his album Stories to Tell.
