= Luck of Our Own =

Studio album by Dale Daniel
- Released: 1993
- Genre: Country
- Length: 32:25
- Label: BNA
- Producer: Jerry Crutchfield

Luck of Our Own is an album by American country music singer Dale Daniel. (Lisa Dale Daniel) It was released in 1993 via BNA Records, a division of RCA records which at the time was known as BNA Entertainment. The album produced the singles "You Gave Her Your Name" and "Coming Back to Haunt Me". Jerry Crutchfield produced. Keith Urban later covered the title track on his first American self-titled album. The album features background vocals by Carol Ann Etheridge Ford, Gary Burr, Curtis “Mr.Harmony” young, and Dale. Burr also was the co-writer of Luck Of Our Own with Dale.

== Critical reception ==
The album received positive reviews. Entertainment Weekly critic Alanna Nash gave it a B, saying that Daniel did not act as a "clone of country's leading divas." Jim Ridley of New Country magazine gave the album three stars out of five, comparing Daniel's voice to Kathie Baillie of Baillie & the Boys, also saying "the songs[…] tread familiar ground with enough honest feeling and detail to signify promise down the line." Billboard also gave a favorable review, saying that her "songwriting will separate Daniel from the pack."

== Track listing ==
1. "Middle of a Miracle" (Don Pfrimmer, George Teren) – 3:00
2. "Luck of Our Own" (Gary Burr, Dale Daniel) – 3:30
3. "Border Line" (Daniel, Naomi Martin) – 3:19
4. "Where Do You Go When You Dream" (Teren, Pfrimmer) – 3:10
5. "Coming Back to Haunt Me" (Rick Bowles, Daniel) – 2:57
6. "You Gave Her Your Name" (Daniel, Martin, Pfrimmer) – 3:31
7. "Don't Let the Same Dog Bite You Twice" (Jimmy Stewart, Teren) – 2:57
8. "The Dust Ain't Settled Yet" (Craig Bickhardt, Brent Maher, Don Schlitz) – 2:48
9. "One More Bend" (Daniel, Martin) – 3:47
10. "Daddy's Little Girl" (Angela Kaset, Kenya Walker, Stan Webb) – 3:14

== Personnel ==
Compiled from liner notes.

- Gary Burr — background vocals
- Dale Daniel — lead vocals, background vocals
- Carol Ann Etheridge — background vocals
- Sonny Garrish — steel guitar
- Steve Gibson — acoustic guitar
- Mike Henderson — electric guitar
- Mitch Humphries — piano
- Dave Innis — piano
- Paul Leim — drums, percussion
- Terry McMillan — harmonica
- Michael Rhodes — bass guitar
- Brent Rowan — electric guitar
- Hank Singer — fiddle
- Biff Watson — acoustic guitar
- Bob Wray — bass guitar
- Curtis "Mr. Harmony" Young — background vocals
