= Who Wouldn't Wanna Be Me =

Single by Keith Urban

from the album Golden Road
- Released: 8 July 2003
- Recorded: 2001–2002
- Genre: Country; country rock
- Length: 4:15 (album version); 3:41 (radio edit)
- Label: Capitol Nashville
- Songwriters: Monty Powell; Keith Urban
- Producer: Keith Urban

Keith Urban singles chronology
"Raining on Sunday" (2003)	"Who Wouldn't Wanna Be Me" (2003)	"You'll Think of Me" (2004)

"Who Wouldn't Wanna Be Me" is a song co-written and recorded by Australian country music singer Keith Urban. It was released in July 2003 as the third single from his 2002 album Golden Road. The song became his third number one hit on the U.S. Billboard Hot Country Singles & Tracks chart and peaked at number 30 on the U.S. Billboard Hot 100 chart. Urban wrote this song with Monty Powell.

== Music video ==
The music video was directed by Sam Erickson and premiered in mid 2003. It features footage from Urban's 2003 summer tour, as well as shots of Urban riding a motorcycle.

== Personnel ==
The following musicians perform on this track:

- Keith Urban — lead vocals, background vocals, electric guitar, ganjo
- Chris McHugh — drums, percussion
- Jason Mowery — mandolin
- Monty Powell — background vocals
- Jimmie Lee Sloas — bass guitar

== Chart positions ==
Chart (2003)	Peak position
US Billboard Hot 100	30
US Hot Country Songs (Billboard)	1

=== Year-end charts ===
Chart (2003)	Position
US Country Songs (Billboard)	20

== Certifications ==
Region	Certification	Certified units/sales
United States (RIAA)	Gold	500,000^{‡}
^{‡} Sales+streaming figures based on certification alone.
