= I Told You So (Keith Urban song) =

2007 song by Keith Urban

Single by Keith Urban

from the album Love, Pain & the Whole Crazy Thing
- Released: 8 May 2007
- Genre: Country
- Length: 4:27 (album version); 4:02 (radio edit)
- Label: Capitol Nashville
- Songwriter: Keith Urban
- Producers: Dann Huff; Keith Urban

Keith Urban singles chronology
"Stupid Boy" (2006)	"I Told You So" (2007)	"Everybody" (2007)

"I Told You So" is a song written and recorded by Australian country music artist Keith Urban. It was released in May 2007 as the third single from his 2006 album Love, Pain & the Whole Crazy Thing. The song peaked at number 2 on the US Billboard Hot Country Songs chart and at number 48 on the Billboard Hot 100.

This song is used in the Rock Band Country Track Pack.

== Content ==
"I Told You So" is a moderate-uptempo tune that talks about a man who has just met a lover with whom he recently split up. Upon encountering her, he begs for her to return, provided that she doesn't need to apologize for her own actions ("Please, just come back home / No, don't say that you're sorry / And I won't say 'I told you so'.").

=== Composition ===
The song features a Celtic influence, partially due to the use of Uilleann pipes. Snare drums are also used heavily throughout, most notably between the second chorus and the bridge. According to the album's liner notes, Urban plays several instruments in the song, including the electric guitar, the acoustic guitar, the ganjo, the bouzouki, the mandolin, the slide guitar, and some percussion. He also sings all of the vocals.

The song is set in the key of C♯ minor. Each section has its own chord progression. The intro, verses, and outro have a progression of C♯m-E-B-F♯m. The pre-chorus has a chord progression of A-B/A-A-B-A. The chorus uses a chord progression of E-B-F♯m-A-E-B-F♯m-A. The bridge has the chord progression of F♯m-A-F♯m-C♯m-F♯m-E/G♯-A. Urban’s vocals range from G♯_{2}-C♯_{5}.

=== Album version and radio edit differences ===
The radio edit features a shortened bridge, as well as a slightly truncated outro.

== Critical reception ==
Kevin John Coyne of Country Universe gave the song an A grade, saying that he "love[s] Urban's most recent album because he expands on his basic signature sound" and that it "doesn't hurt that the material is stronger" although the instrumental bridge is "like nothing [he's] ever heard before, on a country record or otherwise."

== Personnel ==
As listed in liner notes.

- Keith Urban – lead vocals, background vocals, lead electric guitar, acoustic guitar, ganjo, mandolin, bouzouki, slide guitar, percussion
- Tom Bukovac – rhythm guitar
- Eric Darken – percussion
- Dann Huff – electric 12-string guitar, percussion
- Chris McHugh – drums, percussion
- Tim Lauer – accordion, synthesizer
- Eric Rigler – tin whistle, Uilleann pipes
- Jimmie Lee Sloas – bass guitar
- Jonathan Yudkin – fiddle

== Chart performance ==
"I Told You So" entered the U. S. Billboard Hot Country Songs chart at number 53 on the chart week of 28 April 2007. It debuted on the Billboard Hot 100 at number 94.

Chart (2007)	Peak position
Canada Country (Billboard)	1
Canada Hot 100 (Billboard)	56
US Billboard Hot 100	48
US Hot Country Songs (Billboard)	2

=== Year-end charts ===
Chart (2007)	Position
US Country Songs (Billboard)	22

== Certifications ==
Region	Certification	Certified units/sales
United States (RIAA)	Gold	500,000^{‡}
^{‡} Sales+streaming figures based on certification alone.
