= Stupid Boy =

2006 single by Keith Urban

Single by Keith Urban

from the album Love, Pain & the Whole Crazy Thing
- Released: 5 December 2006
- Recorded: 2006
- Genre: Country rock
- Length: 6:21 (album version); 3:46 (radio edit)
- Label: Capitol Nashville
- Songwriters: Dave Berg; Deanna Bryant; Sarah Buxton
- Producers: Dann Huff; Keith Urban

Keith Urban singles chronology
"Once in a Lifetime" (2006)	"Stupid Boy" (2006)	"I Told You So" (2007)

"Stupid Boy" is a song written by Dave Berg, Deanna Bryant, and Sarah Buxton. Originally recorded by Buxton, the song was later recorded by Australian country music singer Keith Urban on his 2006 album Love, Pain & the Whole Crazy Thing. Urban's version was released as that album's second single in December 2006 and peaked at number 3 on the US Billboard Hot Country Songs chart. A year after its release, Urban won a Grammy Award for Best Male Country Vocal Performance of the song.

== History ==
Urban told Billboard that he recorded "Stupid Boy" at the suggestion of his then-wife, actress Nicole Kidman. He also noted how the song's subject matter contrasted with the more up-tempo love song "Once in a Lifetime", the album's first single, saying that the two songs were "yin and yang". Sarah Buxton, who co-wrote the song, recorded a version before Urban did. This version was included on a 2007 extended play entitled Almost My Record as well as Buxton's 2010 self-titled album.

== Critical reception ==
Tamara Conniff and Ray Waddell of Billboard described the song as "a ballad on how men foolishly break the hearts of the women they love." Associated Press reviewer Michael McCall called it "a funky, witty take on a guy who can't appreciate how good he has it."

In 2008, the song won Urban a Grammy Award for Best Male Country Vocal Performance.

== Personnel ==
As listed in liner notes.

- Tom Bukovac – rhythm guitar
- Eric Darken – percussion
- Dann Huff – rhythm guitar
- Rami Jaffee – Hammond B-3 organ
- Tim Lauer – pump organ, synthesizer
- Chris McHugh – drums
- Jimmie Lee Sloas – bass guitar
- Keith Urban – lead guitar, acoustic guitar, all vocals

== Chart performance ==
Urban's rendition of "Stupid Boy" peaked at number 3 on the US Billboard Hot Country Songs chart.

Chart (2006–2007)	Peak position
Canada Country (Billboard)	1
US Billboard Hot 100	43
US Hot Country Songs (Billboard)	3
Chart (2021)	Peak position
Australia Digital Song Sales chart (Billboard)	7

=== Year-end charts ===
Chart (2007)	Position
US Country Songs (Billboard)	29

== Certifications ==
Region	Certification	Certified units/sales
Australia (ARIA)	Gold	35,000^{‡}
United States (RIAA)	Platinum	1,000,000^{‡}
^{‡} Sales+streaming figures based on certification alone.

== Cassadee Pope version ==
"Stupid Boy"

Single by Cassadee Pope

from the album The Complete Season 3 Collection
- Released: 10 December 2012
- Recorded: 2012
- Genre: Country
- Length: 3:38
- Label: Universal
- Songwriters: Dave Berg, Deanna Bryant, Sarah Buxton

Cassadee Pope performed this song on NBC's singing competition show, The Voice. Pope went on to win the competition, and her studio version of the song reached the top of the iTunes Top 10 Singles the day after the song was released.

Chart (2012)	Peak position
Canada (Canadian Hot 100)	28
US Billboard Hot 100	40
US Country Songs (Billboard)	4
