= Where the Blacktop Ends =

Single by Keith Urban

from the album Keith Urban
- B-side: "Rollercoaster"
- Released: April 9, 2001
- Recorded: 1999
- Genre: Country
- Length: 3:00 (album version); 3:07 (radio version)
- Label: Capitol Nashville
- Songwriters: Allen Shamblin; Steve Wariner
- Producers: Matt Rollings; Keith Urban

Keith Urban singles chronology
"But for the Grace of God" (2000)	"Where the Blacktop Ends" (2001)	"Somebody Like You" (2002)

"Where the Blacktop Ends" is a song written by Allen Shamblin and Steve Wariner and recorded by Australian country music singer Keith Urban. It was released in April 2001 as the fourth and final single from Urban's first American self-titled album. The song became the Urban's third (consecutive) Top 5 hit on the US Billboard Hot Country Singles and Tracks chart after reaching number 3.

== Chart positions ==
"Where the Blacktop Ends" debuted at number 55 on the U.S. Billboard Hot Country Singles & Tracks for the week of April 14, 2001.

Chart (2001)	Peak position
US Billboard Hot 100	35
US Hot Country Songs (Billboard)	3

=== Year-end charts ===
Chart (2001)	Position
US Country Songs (Billboard)	15
