= Raining on Sunday =

Single by Keith Urban

from the album Golden Road
- Released: January 21, 2003
- Recorded: 2001–2002
- Genre: Country
- Length: 4:45 (album version); 3:54 (radio edit)
- Label: Capitol Nashville
- Songwriter(s): Darrell Brown; Radney Foster
- Producer(s): Dann Huff; Keith Urban

Keith Urban singles chronology
"Somebody Like You" (2002)	"Raining on Sunday" (2003)	"Who Wouldn't Wanna Be Me" (2003)

"Raining on Sunday" is a song co-written by country music artist Radney Foster and Darrell Brown. It was initially recorded on Foster's 1999 Arista Records album See What You Want to See. Foster's version of the song features a backing vocal from Darius Rucker of the rock band Hootie & the Blowfish.

Keith Urban covered the song for his 2002 album Golden Road. His rendition was released as the album's second single in January 2003.

== Personnel ==
The following musicians perform on Urban's version:

- Keith Urban — lead vocals, background vocals, electric guitar
- Tom Bukovac — electric guitar
- Matt Chamberlain — drums
- Eric Darken — percussion
- Scotty Huff — background vocals
- Steve Nathan — keyboards
- Jimmie Lee Sloas — bass guitar

== Chart performance ==
=== Weekly charts ===
Weekly chart performance for "Raining on Sunday"
Chart (2003)	Peak position
Australia (ARIA)	79
US Billboard Hot 100	38
US Hot Country Songs (Billboard)	3

=== Year-end charts ===
Year-end chart performance for "Raining on Sunday"
Chart (2003)	Position
US Country Songs (Billboard)	13
