= Chris Lane =

American singer-songwriter (born 1984)

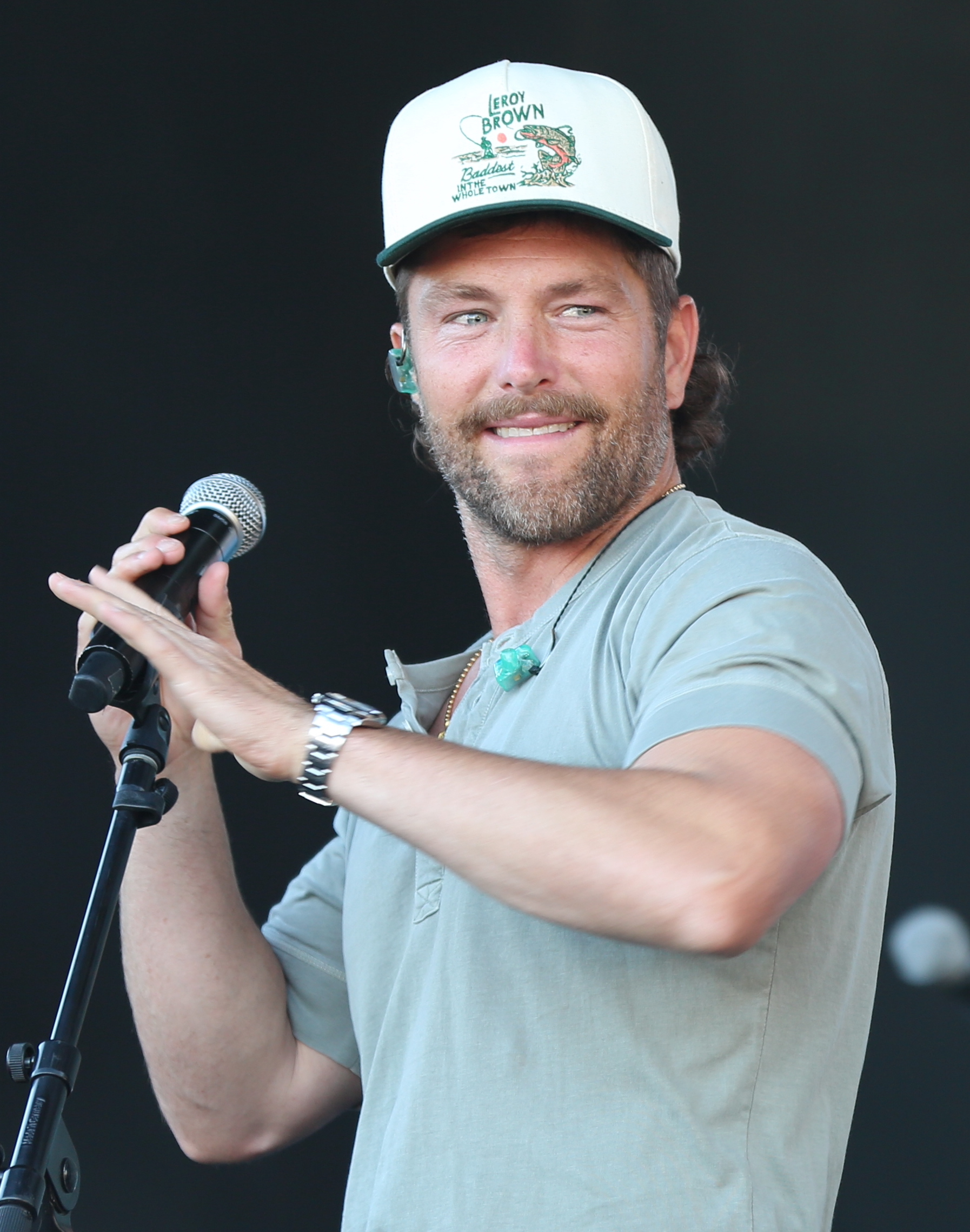
- Lane in 2022
- Born: Christopher Eric Lane; November 9, 1984 (age 41); Kernersville, North Carolina, U.S.
- Occupations: Singer; songwriter
- Years active: 2012–present
- Spouse: Lauren Bushnell (m. 2019)
- Children: 3
- Musical career
- Genres: Country pop
- Instruments: Vocals; guitar
- Labels: Red Street; Big Loud
- Website: iamchrislane.com

Christopher Eric Lane (born November 9, 1984) is an American country music singer and songwriter. He has released one album as frontman of the Chris Lane Band, a second album, Girl Problems, and a third album, Laps Around the Sun. via Big Loud Records. Lane has charted seven singles on Hot Country Songs and Country Airplay, three of which went to No. 1 ("Fix", "I Don't Know About You", and "Big, Big Plans").

== Early life and career beginnings ==
Lane grew up in Kernersville, North Carolina, and has a twin brother named Cory. While attending Glenn High School, he and his brother played football and baseball, and both went on to play baseball in college at University of North Carolina at Charlotte. Lane learned to play the guitar when sports injuries affected his chances of a professional baseball career. In his hometown he worked for his father's landscaping business and started a cover band that played in High Point University cafeteria. In 2007, Lane and his brother auditioned for the seventh season of American Idol but did not make it to Hollywood. It wasn't until 2008 when Chris’s high school friend Brent Eliason introduced him to Seth England of Big Loud Mountain and told his 'Uncle Seth' he had to listen to his mixtape. This was the moment which launched Chris's career as an up-and-coming country music artist.

== Career ==
Before pursuing a solo career, Lane fronted the Chris Lane Band. Their album Let's Ride charted on the Billboard Top Country Albums chart in 2012. He moved to Nashville in 2013. Lane has opened for The Band Perry, Eli Young Band, Lee Brice, Chris Young and Brantley Gilbert, among others. In 2014, he opened for Florida Georgia Line on their This Is How We Roll Tour.

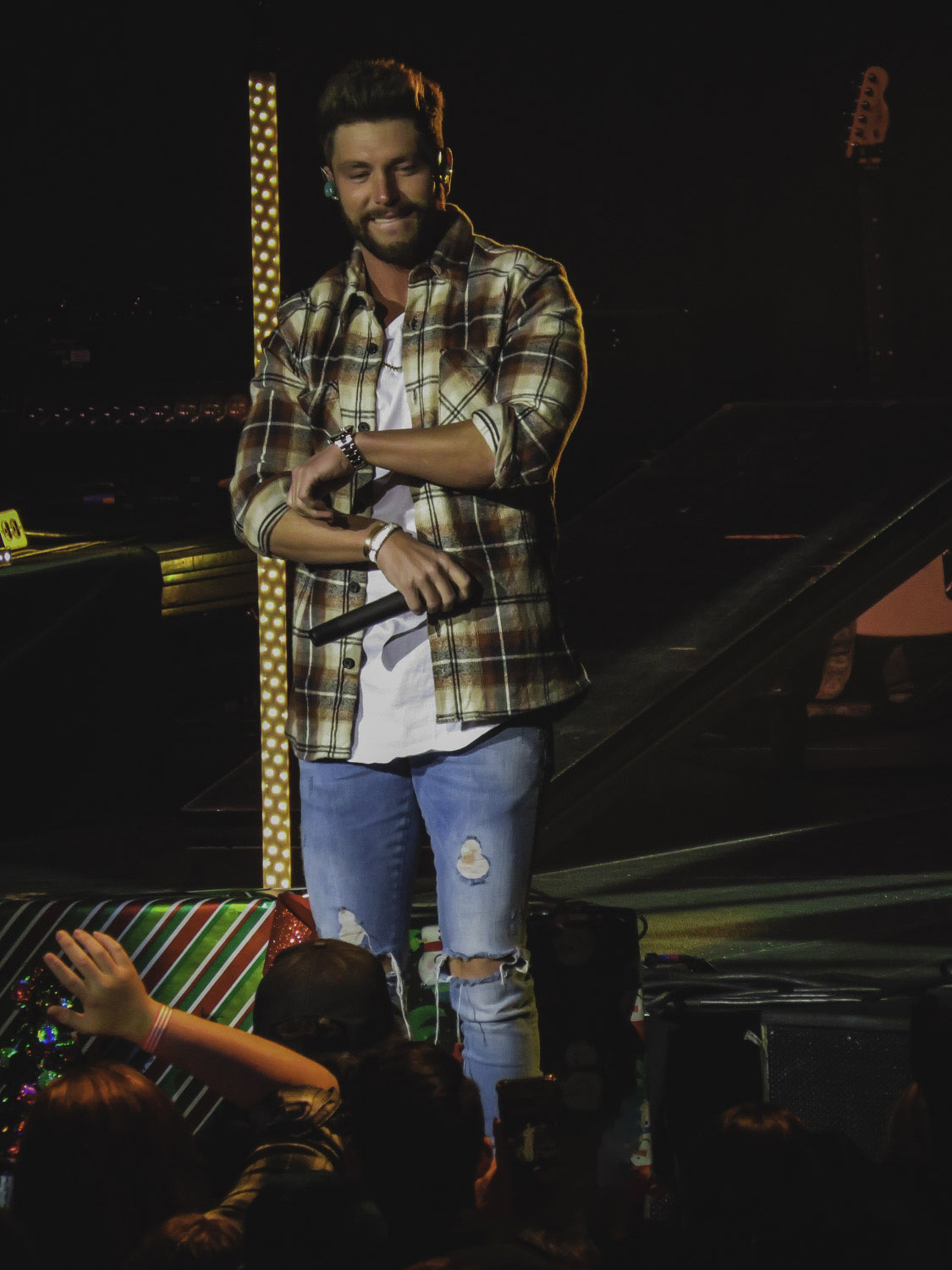
Chris Lane live at 98.5 KYGO's Christmas Jam, 2017

Lane's debut single, "Broken Windshield View", was released to country radio on June 10, 2014, by Big Loud Mountain. The song was written by Rodney Clawson, Shane Minor, and David Lee Murphy and produced by Joey Moi. It was featured on Sirius XM's The Highway and iTunes' New and Noteworthy. It sold 11,000 downloads in its first week of release and reached number 45 on the Billboard Hot Country Songs chart. As of August 2014, it has sold 43,000 downloads. It was also included on an extended play.

Lane released his debut album Girl Problems in August 2016. It accounted for the singles "Fix" and "For Her". His second album, Laps Around the Sun, produced the duet "Take Back Home Girl" (featuring Tori Kelly) and "I Don't Know About You". In 2019, "Big, Big Plans" was released and became his third number one on the Billboard Country Airplay chart, but it was never included on an album, and after "Fill Them Boots" failed to reach the top 40 of the chart in 2021, he parted ways with Big Loud.

In 2021, he featured on the single "Tailgate to Heaven" by Canadian country artist Shawn Austin.

Lane signed a joint venture with his own imprint Voyager Records and the newly-developed Red Street Records in 2023 and "Find Another Bar" will be released on August 21, 2023, as his first single for the label.

== Personal life ==
In 2018, Lane began dating Lauren Bushnell, the winner of the 20th season of The Bachelor. They got engaged on June 16, 2019. The two married in Nashville on October 25, 2019. On December 6, 2020, Lane and Bushnell announced they were expecting their first child. On January 1, 2021, it was revealed that the baby would be a son. On June 8, 2021, their son was born. On June 6, 2022, Lane and Bushnell announced that they were expecting their second child in late October. On October 16, 2022, their second son was born. Their third child, a daughter, was born on November 11, 2025.

== Discography ==
Chris Lane discography
- Studio albums: 3
- EPs: 2
- Singles: 9
- Music videos: 6
- No. 1 singles (Billboard): 3
- No. 1 singles (overall): 4

=== Albums ===
Title	Album details	Peak positions			certifications
Title	Album details	US	US Country	CAN	certifications
Let's Ride (with Chris Lane Band)	Release date: April 17, 2012; Label: Loradale Drive	—	75	—	
Girl Problems	Release date: August 5, 2016; Label: Big Loud	55	8	83	
Laps Around the Sun	Release date: July 13, 2018; Label: Big Loud	83	8	51	RIAA: Gold; MC: Gold
Shade Tree	Release date: June 20, 2025; Label: Red Street	—	—	—	
"—" denotes releases that did not chart

=== Extended plays ===
Title	EP details	Peak chart positions		
Title	EP details	US Country	US Heat	US Indie
Fix	Release date: November 13, 2015; Label: Big Loud Mountain	23	4	40
Take Back Home	Release date: November 17, 2017; Label: Big Loud Mountain	—	—	—

=== Singles ===
==== As lead artist ====
Year	Title	Peak chart positions					Certifications	Album
Year	Title	US	US Country	US Country Airplay	CAN	CAN Country	Certifications	Album
2012	"All I Ever Needed" (with Chris Lane Band)	—	—	—	—	—		Let's Ride
2012	"Let's Ride" (with Chris Lane Band)	—	—	—	—	—		Let's Ride
2014	"Broken Windshield View"	—	45	56	—	—		Non-album single
2015	"Fix"	65	10	1	100	8	RIAA: Platinum; MC: Platinum	Girl Problems
2016	"For Her"	92	17	10	—	1	RIAA: Platinum; MC: Gold	Girl Problems
2017	"Take Back Home Girl" (featuring Tori Kelly)	55	12	8	79	3	RIAA: 2× Platinum; MC: 2× Platinum	Laps Around the Sun
2018	"I Don't Know About You"	39	2	1	85	1	RIAA: 3× Platinum; MC: 2× Platinum	Laps Around the Sun
2019	"Big, Big Plans"	42	3	1	—	5	RIAA: 2× Platinum; MC: Platinum	Non-album singles
2021	"Fill Them Boots"	—	—	41	—	—		Non-album singles
2023	"Find Another Bar"	—	—	28	—	—		From Where I'm Sippin'
2025	"If I Die Before You"	—	—	52	—	—		Shade Tree
"—" denotes releases that did not chart

==== As featured artist ====
Year	Title	Peak chart positions		Certifications	Album
Year	Title	CAN	CAN Country	Certifications	Album
2020	"Hold You Tonight" (Gryffin featuring Chris Lane)	—	—	MC: Gold	Non-album single
2021	"Tailgate to Heaven" (Shawn Austin featuring Chris Lane)	61	5	MC: Gold	Planes Don't Wait

==== Promotional singles ====
Year	Title	Album
2021	"That's What Mamas Are For"	Non-album singles
2021	"Ain't Even Met You Yet"	Non-album singles
2021	"Stop Coming Over"	Non-album singles
2022	"Howdy"	Non-album singles
2022	"Dancin' in the Moonlight" (featuring Lauren Alaina)	Non-album singles
2022	"Birthday Girl" (Nelly featuring Chris Lane)	Non-album singles
2024	"Nothin' to Wear"	Shade Tree
2024	"What Am I Supposed to Tell the Dog"	Shade Tree
2025	"Fire We Found" (with Abby Anderson)	Shade Tree

=== Music videos ===
Year	Video	Director
2012	"Let's Ride"	John Ryan Flaherty
2014	"Broken Windshield View"	Robert Hales
2016	"Fix"	TK McKamy
2016	"For Her"	TK McKamy
2017	"Take Back Home Girl" (featuring Tori Kelly)	Justin Clough
2018	"I Don't Know About You"	Justin Clough
2021	"Tailgate to Heaven" (with Shawn Austin)	

== Awards and nominations ==
Year	Award	Category	Recipient/Work	Result	Ref
2017	iHeartRadio Music Awards	Best New Country Artist	Chris Lane	Nominated	
2017	ACM Awards	New Male Vocalist of the Year	Chris Lane	Nominated	
2022	Canadian Country Music Association	Single of the Year	"Tailgate to Heaven" (with Shawn Austin)	Nominated	
