= Once in a Lifetime (Keith Urban song) =

Single by Keith Urban

from the album Love, Pain & the Whole Crazy Thing
- Released: 22 August 2006
- Recorded: 2006
- Genre: Country
- Length: 5:54 (album version); 4:11 (radio edit)
- Label: Capitol Nashville
- Songwriters: John Shanks; Keith Urban
- Producers: Keith Urban; Dann Huff

Keith Urban singles chronology
"Tonight I Wanna Cry" (2005)	"Once in a Lifetime" (2006)	"Stupid Boy" (2006)

"Once in a Lifetime" is a song co-written and recorded by Australian country music artist Keith Urban. It was released on 22 August 2006 as the first single from his 2006 album Love, Pain & the Whole Crazy Thing. Urban wrote this song with John Shanks, and produced it with Dann Huff. The song received mixed critical reception for its lyrics and sound. It debuted at number 17 on the Billboard Hot Country Songs charts, setting a record at the time for the highest debut on that chart.

== Content ==
"Once in a Lifetime" has a "moderately fast driving rock" tempo of approximately 126 beats per minute, and is composed in the key of G major. Lyrically, the song is about a feeling of love between the narrator and his partner.

== Critical reception ==
Kevin John Coyne of Country Universe wrote, "Usually his up-tempo songs are interchangeable, but this one stands out. His vocal has more flavor than usual and the groove has a bit more kick." The Plain Dealer writer John Soeder thought the song had a techno beat and had "a half-dozen clichés" in the chorus.

== Personnel ==
As listed in liner notes.

- Keith Urban – lead and backing vocals, lead guitar, acoustic guitar, ganjo, EBow, piano
- Tom Bukovac – rhythm guitar
- Larry Corbett – cello
- Eric Darken – percussion
- Rami Jaffee – Hammond B-3 organ
- Tim Lauer – synthesizer
- Chris McHugh – drums, drum machine programming
- Jimmie Lee Sloas – bass guitar
- David Stone – upright bass
- Russell Terrell – background vocals

== Charts ==
"Once in a Lifetime" debuted at number 17 on the Billboard Hot Country Songs charts dated 2 September 2006. This was at the time the highest debut in the history of the Billboard country charts, surpassing Eddie Rabbitt's "Every Which Way but Loose" and Garth Brooks's "Good Ride Cowboy", both of which debuted at number 18 in 1978 and 2005, respectively.

=== Weekly charts ===
Weekly chart performance for "Once in a Lifetime"
Chart (2006)	Peak position
Australia (ARIA)	18
Canada Country (Billboard)	1
Switzerland (Schweizer Hitparade)	92
US Billboard Hot 100	31
US Adult Contemporary (Billboard)	26
US Hot Country Songs (Billboard)	6

=== Year-end charts ===
Year-end chart performance for "Once in a Lifetime"
Chart (2006)	Position
US Country Songs (Billboard)	40

== Certifications ==
Region	Certification	Certified units/sales
Australia (ARIA)	Gold	35,000^{‡}
United States (RIAA)	Gold	500,000^{‡}
^{‡} Sales+streaming figures based on certification alone.
