= Your Everything =

2000 single by Keith Urban

Single by Keith Urban

from the album Keith Urban
- B-side: "If You Wanna Stay"
- Released: May 2, 2000
- Recorded: 1999
- Genre: Country
- Length: 4:10 (album version); 3:59 (radio edit)
- Label: Capitol Nashville
- Songwriters: Chris Lindsey; Bob Regan
- Producers: Matt Rollings; Keith Urban

Keith Urban singles chronology
"It's a Love Thing" (1999)	"Your Everything" (2000)	"But for the Grace of God" (2000)

"Your Everything" is a song written by Chris Lindsey and Bob Regan and recorded by Australian country music singer Keith Urban. It was released in May 2000 as the second single from Urban's first American self-titled album. The song became his first Top 5 hit on the US Billboard Hot Country Singles and Tracks chart, with a peak at number four.

== Music video ==
The music video was directed by Trey Fanjoy, and premiered on CMT on May 6, 2000, when CMT named it a "Hot Shot".

== Chart positions ==
Chart (2000)	Peak position
Canada Country Singles (RPM)	20
US Billboard Hot 100	51
US Hot Country Songs (Billboard)	4

=== Year-end charts ===
Chart (2000)	Position
US Country Songs (Billboard)	15
