= You'll Think of Me =

Single by Keith Urban

from the album Golden Road
- Released: 8 December 2003
- Recorded: 2002
- Genre: Country
- Length: 4:53 (album version); 3:51 (radio edit)
- Label: Capitol Nashville
- Songwriters: Darrell Brown; Dennis Matkosky; Ty Lacy
- Producers: Dann Huff; Keith Urban

Keith Urban singles chronology
"Who Wouldn't Wanna Be Me" (2003)	"You'll Think of Me" (2003)	"Days Go By" (2004)

"You'll Think of Me" is a song by Australian and American country music artist Keith Urban. The track, written by Darrell Brown, Dennis Matkosky, and Ty Lacy and produced by Urban and Dann Huff, was recorded for his third studio album Golden Road (2002). It was released on 8 December 2003 as the fourth and final single from the album by Capitol Records Nashville.

It was a hit single from the album, spending a two-week run atop the US Hot Country Songs. A crossover hit, it peaked at number two on the Adult Contemporary chart, number six on the Adult Top 40 chart, and number 38 on the Pop Airplay chart; this led the single to peak at number 24 on the all-genre Billboard Hot 100.

In 2024, Rolling Stone ranked the song at number 185 on its 200 Greatest Country Songs of All Time ranking.

== Content ==
"You'll Think of Me" is about a man undergoing a breakup and telling his ex that she will regret breaking up with him. It has a "moderate" tempo in the key of A major, following a chord pattern of A-E-F♯m^{7}-D.

== Music video ==
The music video was directed by Sam Erickson and premiered in January 2004.

== Personnel ==
As listed in liner notes.

- Keith Urban — lead vocals, backing vocals, acoustic guitar, electric guitar
- Tom Bukovac — electric guitar
- Matt Chamberlain — drums
- Eric Darken — percussion
- Dan Dugmore — electric guitar
- Steve Nathan — keyboards
- Jimmie Lee Sloas — bass guitar
- Russell Terrell — background vocals

== Track listing ==
UK CD single
No.	Title	Writer(s)	Producer(s)	Length
1.	"You'll Think of Me" (Jeremy Wheatley Remix)	Darrell Brown; Dennis Matkosky; Ty Lacy	Dann Huff; Keith Urban	3:53
2.	"If You Wanna Stay"	Keith Urban	Urban; Matt Rollings	4:27

Europe CD single
No.	Title	Writer(s)	Producer(s)	Length
1.	"You'll Think of Me" (Jeremy Wheatley Remix)	Darrell Brown; Dennis Matkosky; Ty Lacy	Dann Huff; Keith Urban	3:53
2.	"You'll Think of Me" (Recorded Live in Los Angeles)	Brown; Matkosky; Lacy	Urban	3:58
3.	"If You Wanna Stay"	Keith Urban	Urban	4:27
4.	"What About Me"	Urban; Rodney Crowell	Urban	3:51

UK & Europe DVD single
No.	Title	Length
1.	"You'll Think of Me"
2.	"Better Life"
3.	"What About Me" (Plus Photo Gallery)

== Charts ==
=== Weekly charts ===
Chart (2003–2005)	Peak position
Canada Country (Radio & Records)	2
US Billboard Hot 100	24
US Adult Contemporary (Billboard)	2
US Adult Pop Airplay (Billboard)	6
US Hot Country Songs (Billboard)	1
US Pop Airplay (Billboard)	38

=== Year-end charts ===
Chart (2004)	Position
US Billboard Hot 100	93
US Adult Contemporary (Billboard)	18
US Country Songs (Billboard)	3

Chart (2005)	Position
US Adult Contemporary (Billboard)	10

== Release history ==
Release dates and format(s) for "You'll Think of Me"
Region	Date	Format(s)	Label(s)	Ref.
United States	8 December 2003	Country radio	Capitol Nashville	
United States	3 May 2004	Adult contemporary radio	Capitol Nashville	
United States	31 May 2005	Hot adult contemporary radio	Capitol Nashville	
United States	August 2005	Contemporary hit radio	Capitol Nashville	

== Certifications ==
Region	Certification	Certified units/sales
Australia (ARIA)	Platinum	70,000^{‡}
United States (RIAA)	2× Platinum	2,000,000^{‡}
^{‡} Sales+streaming figures based on certification alone.

== Awards ==
In 2006, this song became Keith Urban's first to win the Grammy Award for Best Male Country Vocal Performance at the 48th Annual Grammy Awards.
