= But for the Grace of God (song) =

Single by Keith Urban

from the album Keith Urban
- B-side: "I Thought You Knew"
- Released: November 28, 2000
- Recorded: 1999
- Genre: Country
- Length: 4:33 (album version); 3:43 (radio version)
- Label: Capitol Nashville
- Songwriters: Keith Urban; Charlotte Caffey; Jane Wiedlin
- Producers: Keith Urban; Matt Rollings

Keith Urban singles chronology
"Your Everything" (2000)	"But for the Grace of God" (2000)	"Where the Blacktop Ends" (2001)

"But for the Grace of God" is a song co-written and recorded by Australian country music singer Keith Urban. Urban wrote the song along with Charlotte Caffey and Jane Wiedlin of The Go-Go's. It was released in November 2000 as the third single from his self-titled American debut album. The song became Urban's first number one hit on the US Billboard Hot Country Singles & Tracks chart for the week of February 24, 2001, and maintained that position for one week. This ended a two-and-a-half-year streak in which no artist on the Capitol Records label achieved a Number One single on the country charts.

== Single and album version differences ==
Both radio edit and album-length versions had been issued. The radio edit excises a musical bridge after the second chorus and has a slightly different ending than the album cut.

== Music video ==
The music video for this song was directed by Trey Fanjoy, and premiered on CMT on December 2, 2000. It features Urban walking down a busy street at night.

== Chart positions ==
Chart (2000–2001)	Peak position
Canada Country Singles (RPM)	75 (Note: "But for the Grace of God" had not yet peaked when RPM ceased publication in November 2000.)
US Billboard Hot 100	37
US Hot Country Songs (Billboard)	1

=== Year-end charts ===
Chart (2001)	Position
US Country Songs (Billboard)	16
