= Sarah Buxton =

American country singer

- Born: Sarah Jane Buxton; July 3, 1980 (age 46)
- Origin: Lawrence, Kansas, U.S.
- Genres: Country
- Occupation: Singer-songwriter
- Instruments: Vocals; acoustic guitar; harmonica
- Years active: 2005–present
- Label: Lyric Street
- Spouse: Tom Bukovac (m. 2010; div. 2020)

Sarah Jane Buxton (born July 3, 1980) is an American country music singer-songwriter formerly signed to the independent Lyric Street Records. Between 2006 and 2008, she issued three singles from an extended play titled Almost My Record, in addition to co-writing her song "Stupid Boy", which was later recorded by Keith Urban. She released her self-titled debut album in early 2010, led off by the Top 25 single "Outside My Window," shortly before Lyric Street Records closed.

== Biography ==
Buxton was born in Lawrence, Kansas. She became actively involved in music as a child by learning piano, playing flute and joining a children's choir. As she learned more about music, she became interested in songwriters and began writing poetry. After graduation, she met one of her musical idols, Stevie Nicks, who encouraged her to pursue music and move to Nashville, Tennessee.

Buxton enrolled at Nashville's Belmont University and started a Southern rock band called Stoik Oak, which toured the region for three years. After an 18-month engagement, she married Christopher Robin of the Christopher Robin Band when she was 22. However, they divorced shortly afterwards. She also felt discouraged about finding a place for her voice in the music business but found further encouragement from one of her friends, John Rich of Big & Rich. She asked her publisher to set up some co-writing sessions, and she became more confident in her approach to singing and songwriting. In the meantime, she sang background vocals for Kenny Rogers and John Corbett, in addition to singing duet vocals on Cowboy Troy's "If You Don't Wanna Love Me".

=== 2006–2010: Lyric Street Records ===
"Stupid Boy", one of Buxton's songs, was covered by Keith Urban, on his mid-2006 album Love, Pain & the Whole Crazy Thing, taking his version to No. 3 on the country charts in 2007. Buxton sang backing vocals on the song "Tu Compañía" from the same album.

Buxton signed to Lyric Street Records that same year and released her debut single "Innocence", which peaked at number 31 on the country music charts. It was followed by "That Kind of Day", which reached number 26 in 2007. Both were included on a five-song digital extended play entitled Almost My Record, released only to digital retailers in mid-2007.

Buxton released "Space", which she wrote with Lari White and Chuck Cannon, in October 2008. It peaked at number 38 in early 2009 and was added to Almost My Record. A fourth single, "Outside My Window", was issued in June 2009 and remained on the charts until February 2010, peaking at number 23. Buxton wrote this song with Victoria Shaw, Gary Burr, and Mark Hudson, who also directed the music video for it.

Buxton released her self-titled debut studio album on February 23, 2010. Produced by Buxton along with Craig Wiseman, Dann Huff, Bob DiPiero, and Blair Daly, the album includes all of her charting singles as well as her version of "Stupid Boy" and three duets with Jedd Hughes.

Lyric Street Records closed in April 2010 and Buxton was dropped from the label. Following the label's closure, she and Hughes formed a duo called Buxton Hughes. Less than a year after forming the duo, Buxton and Hughes parted ways.

=== 2011–present ===
Urban recorded another one of Buxton's songs, "Put You in a Song", for the 2010 album Get Closer. Buxton also wrote Big & Rich's 2012 single "That's Why I Pray", Gary Allan's 2013 single "Pieces" from his album Set You Free, and The Band Perry's 2013 single "Don't Let Me Be Lonely" from their album Pioneer. In 2014, she co-wrote "PrizeFighter" by Trisha Yearwood and Kelly Clarkson, "Sun Daze" by Florida Georgia Line, and "Fix" and "For Her" by Chris Lane.

Buxton has co-written several songs that have appeared on the ABC hit TV show Nashville. Songs include ""Yellin' from the Rooftop", "Loving You is the Only Way to Fly", "Stronger Than Me", "Every Time I Fall in Love", and "Nothing in This World Will Ever Break My Heart Again", for which she and her co-writer Kate York received a Primetime Emmy Award nomination for Outstanding Original Music and Lyrics.

== Musical styles ==
Stewart Mason of Allmusic wrote that Buxton has "an appealingly hoarse singing voice akin to Melissa Etheridge and a no-nonsense lyrical persona somewhat along the lines of Gretchen Wilson." Almost My Record received a positive review from Country Standard Time critic Michael Sudhalter, who said that "Stupid Boy" worked better from a female's perspective, and that "Innocence" was "one of the best songs about reminiscing of young love since Deana Carter's 'Strawberry Wine'." Jessica Phillips of Country Weekly magazine wrote in her review of the album that Buxton's lyrics cast her as "a typical 20-something-year-old girl in America."

== Personal life ==
Buxton became engaged to session guitarist Tom Bukovac on December 20, 2009. They married on November 20, 2010. She gave birth to their first child, Marshall, on December 4, 2012. Their second son, Leo, was born in 2016.

According to Tom Bukovac, he and Buxton decided to end their marriage in 2020.

== Discography ==
=== Studio albums ===
Title	Album details	Peak chart positions	
Title	Album details	US Country	US
Sarah Buxton	Release date: February 23, 2010; Label: Lyric Street Records; Formats: CD, Music Download	12	68

=== Extended plays ===
Title	Album details
Almost My Record	Release date: July 10, 2007; Label: Lyric Street Records; Formats: Music Download
Signs of Life	Release date: November 20, 2020; Label: Big Dolphin Energy; Formats: Music Download
Moonriser	Release date: March 4, 2022; Label: Tone Tree Music; Formats: Music Download
Sumac	Release date: November 16, 2023; Label: Tone Tree Music; Formats: Music Download

=== Singles ===
Year	Single	Peak chart positions		Album
Year	Single	US Country	US Bubbling	Album
2006	"Innocence"	31	—	Almost My Record / Sarah Buxton
2007	"That Kind of Day"	26	—	Almost My Record / Sarah Buxton
2008	"Space"	38	—	Almost My Record / Sarah Buxton
2009	"Outside My Window"	23	7	Sarah Buxton
2019	"Only the Truth"	—	—	Signs of Life
2019	"Say My Name"	—	—	Non-album single
2020	"Some Things Don't Change"	—	—	Signs of Life
2020	"Little Bit Better"	—	—	Signs of Life
2021	"Hard Things"	—	—	Moonriser
2022	"Rain Like This"	—	—	Moonriser
2023	"Loving Means Letting You Go"	—	—	Sumac
2023	"I Wanna Know What Love Is"	—	—	Sumac
2023	"Together at Christmas Time"	—	—	Non-album single
"—" denotes releases that did not chart

=== Guest singles ===
Year	Single	Artist	Peak chart positions		Album
Year	Single	Artist	US Country	US	Album
2005	"If You Don't Wanna Love Me"	Cowboy Troy	—	—	Loco Motive
2011	"Let It Rain"	David Nail	1	51	The Sound of a Million Dreams
"—" denotes releases that did not chart

=== Other charted songs ===
Year	Single	Peak positions	Certifications	Album
Year	Single	US Country	Certifications	Album
2013	"Dayum, Baby" (with Florida Georgia Line)	49	RIAA: Gold	Here's to the Good Times (Florida Georgia Line album)

=== Music videos ===
Year	Video	Director
2006	"Innocence"	Deaton-Flanigen Productions
2009	"Outside My Window"	Mark Hudson
