= Love, Pain & the Whole Crazy Thing =

Studio album by Keith Urban
- Released: 7 November 2006
- Recorded: 2006
- Studio: Blackbird (Nashville, Tennessee); Capitol (Hollywood, California); Dann's House; Hound's Ear (Franklin, Tennessee); Metropolis (London, UK); Ocean Way (Nashville, Tennessee); Cyber Ranch (Nashville, Tennessee); Sound House (Franklin, Tennessee); Sound Kitchen (Franklin, Tennessee)
- Genre: Country; country rock
- Length: 62:21
- Label: Capitol Nashville
- Producer: Keith Urban; Dann Huff

Keith Urban chronology
| Days Go By (2005) | Love, Pain & the Whole Crazy Thing (2006) | Greatest Hits: 18 Kids (2007) |

Singles from Love, Pain & the Whole Crazy Thing
- 1. "Once in a Lifetime" Released: 22 August 2006; 2. "Stupid Boy" Released: 5 December 2006; 3. "I Told You So" Released: 8 May 2007; 4. "Everybody" Released: 18 September 2007

Professional ratings
Review scores
| Source | Rating |
|---|---|
| AllMusic | 4.5/5 stars |

Love, Pain & the Whole Crazy Thing (stylised as Love, Pain & the whole crazy thing) is the fifth studio album by Australian country music singer Keith Urban. It is his fourth album release in the United States, and his fifth for Capitol Nashville. The album was issued on 7 November 2006. It includes four singles with "Once in a Lifetime", "Stupid Boy", "I Told You So" and "Everybody", all of which were top-10 hits on the Billboard country charts. The album has been certified Platinum by the RIAA, CRIA, and ARIA. Urban produced the album with Dann Huff except for "Tu Compañía" and "Got It Right This Time", which Urban produced by himself. It won at the 2007 ARIA Music Awards for Best Country Album.

== Content ==
On the US Billboard Hot Country Songs chart dated 2 September 2006, this album's lead-off single "Once in a Lifetime" debuted at number 17, making it the highest-debuting country single in the 62-year history of the Billboard country music charts at the time. This record was later broken in 2007 by Kenny Chesney's "Don't Blink" (which debuted at number 16 on the same chart), and then again by Garth Brooks' "More Than a Memory" (which debuted at number 1). "Once in a Lifetime" went on to peak at number 6 on the country charts. The other three singles released from this album are "Stupid Boy", "I Told You So", and "Everybody", which went to numbers 3, 2, and 5 individually, making this Urban's first American album to not produce a single number one hit on the country charts. "Raise the Barn", a duet with Ronnie Dunn of Brooks & Dunn, was written in response to Hurricane Katrina.

The song "I Can't Stop Loving You" is a cover of a Leo Sayer song, later covered by Phil Collins in 2002. "Stupid Boy" was originally recorded by Sarah Buxton, who also co-wrote the song.

== Track listing ==
North American Track Listing
| No. | Title | Writer(s) | Length |
|---|---|---|---|
| 1. | "Once in a Lifetime" | John Shanks; Keith Urban | 5:54 |
| 2. | "Shine" | Monty Powell; Urban | 5:17 |
| 3. | "I Told You So" | Urban | 4:27 |
| 4. | "I Can't Stop Loving You" | Billy Nicholls | 4:44 |
| 5. | "Won't Let You Down" | Urban | 3:20 |
| 6. | "Faster Car" | Urban | 4:27 |
| 7. | "Stupid Boy" | Sarah Buxton; Deanna Bryant; Dave Berg | 6:16 |
| 8. | "Used to the Pain" | Darrell Brown; Urban | 3:51 |
| 9. | "Raise the Barn" (featuring Ronnie Dunn) | Powell; Urban | 5:12 |
| 10. | "God Made Woman" (choir: Metro Voices; boy sopranos: The Choristers of Reigate St. Mary) | Hillary Lindsey; Gordie Sampson; Steve McEwan | 4:51 |
| 11. | "Tu Compañía" (backing vocals: Vanessa Millon and Sarah Buxton) | Powell; Urban | 4:11 |
| 12. | "Everybody" | Richard Marx; Urban | 5:33 |
| 13. | "Got It Right This Time" | Urban | 3:36 |
| Total length: | | | 62:21 |

iTunes bonus track
| No. | Title | Length |
|---|---|---|
| 14. | "Slow Turning" | 5:28 |

Notes

- All songs produced by Keith Urban and Dann Huff, except tracks 11 and 13, produced solely by Urban.
- The Japanese edition omits "Raise the Barn" but adds "Gotta Let It Go" as track 13. The international version omits "Raise the Barn".

== Personnel ==
As listed in liner notes.

Musicians

- Beth Beeson – French horn (12)
- Tom Bukovac – electric guitar (1–5, 7–10, 12)
- Sarah Buxton – vocal percussion (11)
- The Choristers of Reigate St. Mary – boy sopranos (10)
- Larry Corbett – cello (1)
- Eric Darken – percussion (1–5, 7–10, 12)
- Mark Douthit – tenor saxophone (6)
- Dan Dugmore – steel guitar (10)
- Jerry Flowers – background vocals (2, 5, 8, 10)
- Mike Haynes – trumpet (6)
- Erin Horner – French horn (12)
- Dann Huff – acoustic guitar (2, 4, 5, 10), 12-string electric guitar (3), percussion (3), electric guitar (7, 10, 12)
- Rami Jaffee – Hammond B-3 organ (1, 2, 4, 7, 9)
- Chris McHugh – drums (all tracks except 13), programming (1), percussion (3, 8)
- Tim Lauer – synthesizer (1, 3, 5, 7, 12), accordion (3), harmonium (7), pump organ (7), Hammond B-3 organ (10), piano (12)
- Metro Voices – choir (10)
- Vanessa Millon – "Spanish señorita" (10)
- Doug Moffett – baritone saxophone (6)
- Monty Powell – bass guitar (11)
- Eric Rigler – tin whistle (3), uilleann pipes (3)
- Jimmie Lee Sloas – bass guitar (1–5, 7–10, 12)
- David Stone – upright bass (1)
- Russell Terrell – background vocals (1, 2, 4, 5, 8, 10)
- Keith Urban – vocals, acoustic guitar (1–8, 12), electric guitar (all tracks except 13), EBow (1, 8, 12), piano (1, 2, 5), ganjo (1, 2, 3, 6, 11), mandolin (3), bouzouki (3), slide guitar (3, 8), percussion (3), Papoose (5), bass guitar (6), 12-string acoustic guitar (10), keyboards (13), drum machine (13)
- Joy Worland – French horn (12)
- Jonathan Yudkin – fiddle (3, 9)

Strings on tracks 2, 4, 8, and 12 (Nashville String Machine)

- David Campbell – string arranger, conductor
- Carl Gorodetzky – contractor
- David Angell, David Davidson, Conni Ellisor, Carl Gorodetzsky, Cate Myer, Pam Sixfin, Alan Umstead, Cathy Umstead, Mary Kathryn Vanosdale, and Karen Winkelmann – violins
- Monisa Angell, Gary Vanosdale, and Kris Wilkinson – violas
- Larry Corbett, Anthony LaMarchina, Carole Rabinowitz – cellos

Technical

- Denise Arguijo – art production
- Drew Bollman – recording assistant, mixing assistant
- David Campbell – choir arrangement (10)
- Terry Christian – recording
- Steve Churchyard – recording
- Colourworks – digital images
- Betsy Cook – art direction
- Allen Ditto – recording assistant
- Mike "Frog" Griffith – production coordination
- Mark Hagen – recording, overdubbing
- Michelle Hall – art production
- Dino Herrmann – Pro Tools
- Chris Hicky – photography
- Jimmy Hoyson – recording assistant
- Dann Huff – producer (except 11 and 13), recording
- Jeff Kersey – recording of Ronnie Dunn's vocals (9)
- Scott Kidd – recording assistant
- Matt Lawrence – recording
- Suzy Martinez – production coordination
- Dom Morley – mixing assistant
- Seth Morton – recording assistant
- Sangwook Nam – mastering
- Justin Niebank – recording, mixing
- Jenny O'Grady – choir conductor (10)
- Michael Omartian – horn arrangements (6)
- Rohan Onraet – recording assistant
- Leslie Richter – recording assistant
- Doug Sax – mastering
- Mark Vadukal – photography
- Torne White – art direction, design
- Keith Urban – producer (all tracks)
- Brian David Willis – digital editing

== Charts ==
=== Weekly charts ===
| Chart (2006) | Peak position |
|---|---|
| Australian Albums (ARIA) | 5 |
| Austrian Albums (Ö3 Austria) | 23 |
| Canadian Albums (Billboard) | 2 |
| German Albums (Offizielle Top 100) | 32 |
| Japanese Albums (Oricon) | 174 |
| Scottish Albums (OCC) | 54 |
| Swiss Albums (Schweizer Hitparade) | 52 |
| UK Albums (OCC) | 73 |
| US Billboard 200 | 3 |
| US Top Country Albums (Billboard) | 1 |

=== Year-end charts ===
| Chart (2006) | Position |
|---|---|
| Australian Albums (ARIA) | 76 |
| US Top Country Albums (Billboard) | 47 |

| Chart (2007) | Position |
|---|---|
| US Billboard 200 | 26 |
| US Top Country Albums (Billboard) | 4 |

=== Singles ===
| Year | Single | Peak chart positions | | | | | | |
| Year | Single | US Country | US | US AC | AUS | CAN | GER | UK |
|---|---|---|---|---|---|---|---|---|
| 2006 | "Once in a Lifetime" | 6 | 31 | 26 | 18 | — | 66 | 194 |
| 2007 | "Stupid Boy" | 3 | 43 | — | — | — | — | — |
| 2007 | "I Told You So" | 2 | 48 | — | — | 56 | — | — |
| 2007 | "Everybody" | 5 | 64 | — | — | 71 | — | — |
"—" denotes releases that did not chart

== Certifications ==
| Region | Certification | Certified units/sales |
|---|---|---|
| Australia (ARIA) | Platinum | 70,000^{^} |
| Canada (Music Canada) | Platinum | 100,000^{^} |
| United States (RIAA) | Platinum | 1,000,000^{^} |
^{^} Shipments figures based on certification alone.
