= Hunter Hayes discography =

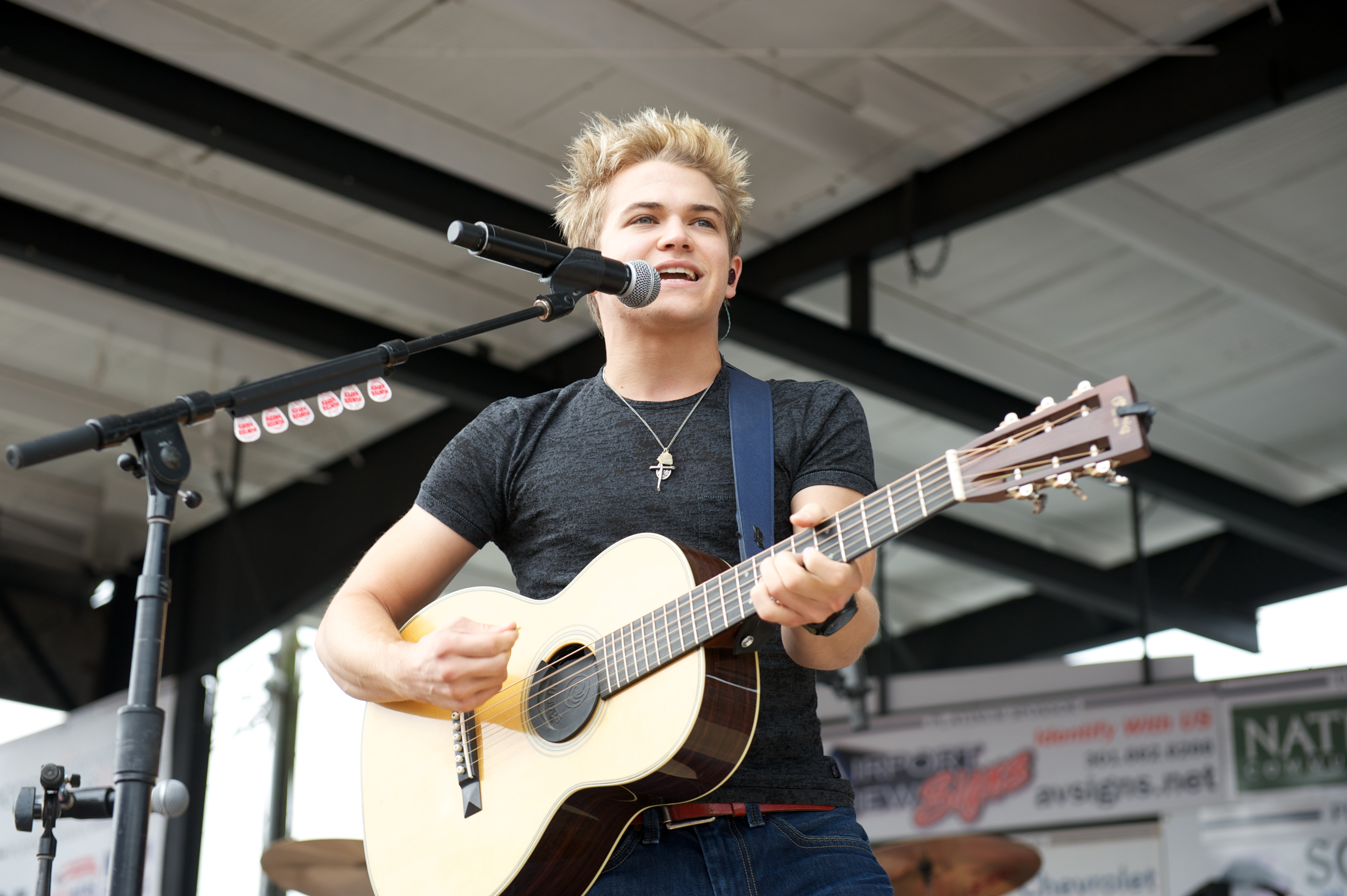
- Hayes performing in 2012
- Studio albums: 10
- EPs: 9
- Live albums: 1
- Compilation albums: 2
- Singles: 27
- Music videos: 38
- Reissues: 2

The discography of American country pop and cajun artist Hunter Hayes consists of ten studio albums, one compilation album, two reissues, five independently released albums, one live extended play, and ten singles. Hayes began his career as a songwriter with Universal Music Publishing Group, moving to Nashville in 2008 and co-writing the song "Play" on Rascal Flatts' 2010 album, Nothing Like This.

After signing to Atlantic Nashville, Hayes released his debut single "Storm Warning" in May 2011. The song preceded his eponymous debut major-label album, Hunter Hayes, which was released October 11, 2011. The album's second single, "Wanted", topped the Hot Country Songs chart and also crossed over to pop and adult contemporary radio. "Somebody's Heartbreak" was the third single from Hunter Hayes, and reached the top of the Country Airplay chart. In June 2013, the album was reissued as Hunter Hayes (Encore), and the collective sales from both editions propelled the album to the No. 1 spot on the Country Albums chart. Two additional singles were issued from Encore: the No. 2-peaking "I Want Crazy" and the re-recorded Jason Mraz duet version of "Everybody's Got Somebody but Me".

Hayes's second album, Storyline, was released May 6, 2014, and debuted at Nos. 1 and 3, respectively, on the Top Country Albums and Billboard 200 album charts with a debut sales week of 69 000 copies sold in the US. The album was preceded in January 2014 by lead single "Invisible", which peaked at No. 4 on the country charts due to significant sales and streaming following the song's debut at the 56th Annual Grammy Awards. "Tattoo" was released in June 2014 as the album's second single. He co-wrote the 2020 single "Hard Dirt" and 2021 single "Been a Minute" by the Hunter Brothers. In 2026, Hayes released his 10th studio album titled Evergreen, accompanied by its lead title single.

== Albums ==
=== Studio albums ===
List of studio albums, with selected chart positions, sales figures and certifications
Title	Details	Peak chart positions					Certifications	Sales
Title	Details	US	US Country	CAN	JPN	UK Country	Certifications	Sales
Through My Eyes	Release date: February 8, 2000; Label: Louisiana Red Hot; Formats: CD, cassette	—	—	—	—	—		
Make a Wish	Release date: November 6, 2001; Label: Sugar Town; Formats: CD, cassette	—	—	—	—	—		
Holidays with Hunter	Release date: November 2003; Label: Sugar Town; Formats: CD	—	—	—	—	—		
Songs About Nothing	Release date: October 20, 2008; Label: Whirlride; Formats: CD, digital download	—	—	—	—	—		
Hunter Hayes	Release date: October 11, 2011; Label: Atlantic Nashville; Formats: CD, digital download	7	1	12	—	6	RIAA: 2× Platinum; MC: Gold	US: 1,138,000
Storyline	Release date: May 6, 2014; Label: Atlantic Nashville; Formats: CD, digital download	3	1	2	38	—		US: 190,000; CAN: 5,600
The 21 Project	Release date: November 5, 2015; Label: Atlantic Nashville; Formats: CD, digital download	93	16	—	—	—		US: 12,400
Wild Blue (Part I)	Release date: August 16, 2019; Label: Warner Nashville / LP Entertainment; Formats: Digital download, music streaming	—	44	—	—	—		US: 1,400
Red Sky	Release date: April 21, 2023; Label: LP Entertainment / DashGo	—	—	—	—	—		
Evergreen	Release date: 2026; Label: Unknown	—	—	—	—	—		
"—" denotes a recording that did not chart or was not released to that territory.

=== Reissues ===
List of compilation album, with selected chart positions and sales figures
Title	Details	Ref.
Wild Blue Complete	Release date: October 22, 2021; Label: LP Entertainment / DashGo; Formats: Digital download	
Red Sky Continued	Release date: October 13, 2023; Label: LP Entertainment / DashGo; Formats: Digital download	

=== Compilation albums ===
List of compilation album, with selected chart positions and sales figures
Title	Details	Peak positions
Title	Details	UK
I Want Crazy	Release date: April 3, 2015; Label: Atlantic Nashville; Formats: CD, digital download	85
Space Tapes	Release date: April 20, 2024; Label: LP Entertainment; Formats: Vinyl, limited-edition	—

=== Live albums ===
List of live albums
Title	Details
Honoring Our French Heritage	Release date: 2006; Label: Juicy Pear; Formats: CD

== Extended plays ==
List of extended plays, with selected chart positions and sales figures
Title	Details	Peak positions
Title	Details	US Country
Hunter Hayes Live	Release date: October 16, 2012; Label: Atlantic Nashville; Formats: CD, digital download	30
Live at Bridgestone	Release date: May 4, 2014; Label: Warner; Formats: Digital download, streaming	—
21	Release date: August 7, 2015; Label: Atlantic Nashville; Formats: Digital streaming	—
Pictures	Release date: January 12, 2018; Label: Warner Nashville; Formats: Digital download, streaming	—
This Christmas	Release date: November 23, 2018; Label: Warner Nashville; Formats: Digital download, streaming	—
Heartbreak (Remixed)	Release date: May 30, 2019; Label: Warner Nashville; Formats: Digital download	—
Sober	Release date: January 18, 2023; Label: LP Entertainment / DashGo; Formats: Digital download	—
Villain	Release date: July 26, 2024; Label: LP Entertainment / DashGo; Formats: Digital download	—
Lost & Found	Release date: November 29, 2024; Label: LP Entertainment / DashGo; Formats: Digital download	—

== Singles ==
=== As main artist ===
List of singles as main artist, with selected chart positions, sales figures and certifications
Single	Year	Peak chart positions								Certifications	Sales	Album
Single	Year	US	US Country	US Country Airplay	US AC	US Adult	US Pop	CAN Country	CAN	Certifications	Sales	Album
"Storm Warning"	2011	78	14	14	—	—	—	39	—	RIAA: Gold	US: 501,000	Hunter Hayes
"Wanted" (Note: "Wanted" reached number one on the Hot Country Songs chart when it was an airplay-only ranking (now called Country Airplay), and then again after the chart switched to a multi-metric ranking.)	2012	16	1	1	13	12	23	1	27	RIAA: 5× Platinum; MC: 2× Platinum; RMNZ: Gold	US: 3,766,000	Hunter Hayes
"Somebody's Heartbreak"	2012	54	7	1	—	—	—	5	66	RIAA: Platinum	US: 772,000	Hunter Hayes
"I Want Crazy" (Note: "Tattoo" and "I Want Crazy" were re-issued as singles in 2015 for the UK only, in support of international album I Want Crazy.)	2013	19	2	2	—	—	—	1	14	RIAA: 2× Platinum; MC: Platinum	US: 1,884,000	Hunter Hayes (Encore)
"Everybody's Got Somebody but Me" (featuring Jason Mraz)	2013	77	18	15	—	—	—	33	—	RIAA: Gold	US: 331,000	Hunter Hayes (Encore)
"Invisible"	2014	44	4	19	—	—	—	30	26	RIAA: Gold	US: 419,000	Storyline
"Tattoo"	2014	— (Note: "Tattoo" did not enter the Billboard Hot 100, but peaked at number 25 on the Bubbling Under Hot 100 Singles chart which acts as a 25-song extension.)	31	24	—	—	—	49	—		US: 74,000	Storyline
"Light Me Up" (Note: "Light Me Up" was released as a single only in the UK.)	2015	—	— (Note: "Light Me Up" did not enter the Billboard Hot Country Songs, but peaked at number 50 on the Country Digital Songs component chart.)	—	—	—	—	—	—		US: 13,000	I Want Crazy
"21"	2015	— (Note: "21" did not enter the Billboard Hot 100, but peaked at number 14 on the Bubbling Under Hot 100 Singles chart which acts as a 25-song extension.)	26	21	—	—	—	—	65		US: 117,000	The 21 Project
"Yesterday's Song"	2016	—	43	44	—	—	—	—	— (Note: "Yesterday's Song" did not enter the Canadian Hot 100, but did peak at number 37 on the Hot Canadian Digital Songs component chart.)			Non-album single
"You Should Be Loved" (featuring the Shadowboxers) (Note: "You Should Be Loved" was released as a single only in Sweden.)	2017	—	—	—	—	—	—	—	—			Pictures
"Dear God"	2018	—	—	—	—	—	—	—	—			Wild Blue (Part I)
"One Shot"	2018	—	—	—	—	—	—	—	—			Wild Blue (Part I)
"Heartbreak"	2019	—	— (Note: "Heartbreak" did not enter the Billboard Hot Country Songs, but peaked at number 22 on the Country Digital Songs component chart.)	56	—	—	—	—	—			Wild Blue (Part I)
"The One That Got Away"	2021	—	—	—	—	—	—	—	—			Red Sky
"If You Change Your Mind"	2021	—	—	—	—	—	—	—	—			Red Sky
"Missing You"	2022	—	—	—	—	—	—	—	—			Red Sky
"Could've Been You"	2022	—	—	—	—	—	—	—	—			Red Sky
"Friend"	2022	—	—	—	—	—	—	—	—			Red Sky
"Feelings (Can I Be Honest?)" (with Loren Gray)	2023	—	—	—	—	—	—	—	—			Non-album single
"Roses"	2023	—	—	—	—	—	—	—	—			Red Sky Continued
"Sober"	2023	—	—	—	—	—	—	—	—			Red Sky Continued
"In A Song" (Lost & Found)	2024	—	—	—	—	—	—	—	—			Lost & Found
"Still Fallin" (Lost & Found)	2024	—	—	—	—	—	—	—	—			Lost & Found
"Somebody's Heartbreak" (Lost & Found)	2024	—	—	—	—	—	—	—	—			Lost & Found
"Around the Sun"	2025	—	—	—	—	—	—	—	—			TBA
"Wait"	2025	—	—	—	—	—	—	—	—			TBA
"Christmas Is Different" (Straight No Chaser featuring Hunter Hayes)	2025	—	—	—	23	—	—	—	—			Holiday Road
"Evergreen"	—	—	—	-	—	—	—	—			Evergreen	
"—" denotes releases that did not chart											Evergreen	

=== Promotional singles ===
Single	Year	Peak chart positions		Sales	Album	Ref.
Single	Year	US Country	CAN	Sales	Album	Ref.
"Almost Paradise" (with Victoria Justice)	2011	—	—		Footloose: Music from the Motion Picture	
"Wild Card"	2014	40	68	US: 20,000	Storyline	
"Storyline"	2014	37	—	US: 40,000	Storyline	
"You Think You Know Somebody"	2014	34	—	US: 34,000	Storyline	
"One Good Reason"	2019	—	—		Wild Blue (Part I)	
"Night and Day"	2020	—	—		Wild Blue (Part I)	
"Tell Me"	2021	—	—		Wild Blue (Part I)	
"Someone Will"	2023	—	—		Red Sky	
"Normal"	2023	—	—		Red Sky	
"Lonely Loves Me"	2023	—	—		Red Sky	
"Victory"	2023	—	—		Red Sky	
"About a Boy"	2023	—	—		Red Sky	
"Songs About You"	2024	—	—		Villain and Space Tapes	
"Best Part"	2024	—	—		Villain and Space Tapes	
"Fix Me"	2024	—	—		Villain and Space Tapes	
"Villain"	2024	—	—		Villain and Space Tapes	
"—" denotes releases that did not chart

=== Other charted songs ===
Single	Year	Peak chart positions			Sales	Album
Single	Year	US Country	US Country Digital	US Country Airplay	Sales	Album
"Go Tell It on the Mountain"	2013	—	—	60		—N/a
"A Thing About You"	2013	49	40	—	US: 15,000	Hunter Hayes (Encore edition)
"Better Than This"	2013	—	46	—	US: 14,000	Hunter Hayes (Encore edition)
"Where It All Begins" (featuring Lady Antebellum)	2015	45	—	—	US: 4,000	The 21 Project
"This Girl"	2018	—	22	—		Non-album single
"—" denotes releases that did not chart

== Music videos ==
List of music videos, showing year released and directors
Year	Video	Director	Ref.
2011	"Storm Warning"	Brian Lazzaro	
2012	"Wanted"	BIRDmachineBIRD	
2012	"Somebody's Heartbreak"	Joel Stewart	
2013	"I Want Crazy"	Ends	
2013	"Everybody's Got Somebody but Me" (featuring Jason Mraz)	Shane Drake	
2013	"Let It Snow! Let It Snow! Let It Snow!"	Paul Miller	
2014	"Invisible"	Ray Kay	
2014	"Tattoo"	Kristin Barlowe	
2015	"Light Me Up"	Jamie Carter	
2015	"21"	Kristin Barlowe	
2017	"Yesterday's Song"	Ryan Hamblin	
2017	"Amen"	Hunter Hayes	
2017	"Rescue"	The Edde Brothers	
2017	"You Should Be Loved" (featuring with The Shadowboxers)	John & Matt Edde (The Edde Brothers)	
2017	"More"	John & Matt Edde (The Edde Brothers)	
2018	"This Girl"	John & Matt Edde (The Edde Brothers)	
2018	"Dear God"	Traci Goudie	
2018	"One Shot"	Unknown	
2019	"One Good Reason"	Unknown	
2019	"Heartbreak"	Colin H Duffy	
2019	"Heartbreak" (Dzeko Remix)	Colin H Duffy	
2020	"Night and Day"	Brenton Giesey	
2020	"Madness"	Brenton Giesey	
2021	"The One That Got Away"	Ryan Sheehy	
2021	"If You Change Your Mind"	Bia Jurema	
2021	"Tell Me"	Scott Felix	
2022	"Missing You"	Krizia Vega	
2022	"Could've Been You"	Alchemy	
2022	"Friend"	Unknown	
2023	"Sober"	Carter Juncal	
2023	"Someone Will"	Carter Juncal	
2023	"Normal"	Andrew Zaeh & Hunter Hayes	
2023	"Lonely Loves Me"	Andrew Zaeh & Hunter Hayes	
2023	"Victory"	Carter Juncal	
2023	"About a Boy"	Andrew Zaeh	
2023	"Roses"	Matthew Gold	
2024	"Still Fallin" (Lost & Found)	Unknown	
2024	"Somebody's Heartbreak" (Lost & Found)	Unknown	

== Miscellaneous ==
=== Other appearances ===
List of guest appearances, showing other applicable performers, year released, and album
Year	Song	Appearance
2012	"Where We Left Off"	Act of Valor: The Album
2013	"Can't Say Love"	Samsung Owner's Hub
2013	"Outstanding In Our Field" (Brad Paisley featuring Hayes on guitar)	Wheelhouse
2014	"Goodbye Yellow Brick Road"	Goodbye Yellow Brick Road: Revisited & Beyond
2014	"All of Me" (John Legend featuring Jennifer Nettles and Hayes)	—N/a
2014	"Listen to the Music" (The Doobie Brothers featuring Hayes on guitar)	Southbound
2014	"Dream Girl"	The Best of Me: Original Motion Picture Soundtrack
2014	"Merry Christmas Baby" (2014 CMA Country Christmas Performance)	Non-album single
2015	"I Can Play Guitar" (Brett Kissel featuring Hunter Hayes)	Pick Me Up
2017	"Happy Xmas (War Is Over)" (Echosmith featuring Hunter Hayes)	An Echosmith Christmas
2018	"Don't Let Me Forget" (Catherine McGrath featuring Hunter Hayes)	Talk of This Town

=== Writing credits ===
List of songs written for other artists, showing co-writers, performer, and the album it appears on
Year	Song	Co-writer(s)	Artist(s)	Album
2010	"Play"	Katrina Elam, Bonnie Baker	Rascal Flatts	Nothing Like This
2012	"Here's Hope"	Luke Laird, Barry Dean	Jewel, Owl City, Jay Sean	Child Hunger Ends Here
2015	"Weight of the World"	Bonnie Baker, Katrina Elam	Rion Page	Rion Page
2020	"Hard Dirt"	Eric Paslay, Steve Moakler	Hunter Brothers	Been a Minute
2021	"Been a Minute"	Luke Dick, Richard Chase McGill	Hunter Brothers	Been a Minute
2021	"Captain"	Benjamin Isbell, Daniel Isbell	Hunter Brothers	Been a Minute
