= Let's Be Crazy Tour =

2013 concert tour by Hunter Hayes

- Tour by Hunter Hayes
- Promotional poster for the tour
- Location: North America
- Associated album: Hunter Hayes
- Start date: October 10, 2013
- End date: December 7, 2013
- No. of shows: 24

Hunter Hayes concert chronology
- Most Wanted Tour (2011); Let's Be Crazy Tour (2013); We're Not Invisible Tour (2014)

The Let's Be Crazy Tour was the second headlining tour by American country music singer Hunter Hayes and is in support of his debut self titled studio album.

== Background ==
On May 1, 2013, Hayes announced the Let's Be Crazy Tour. Ashley Monroe, was the opening act for the tour dates.

== Opening acts ==
- Ashley Monroe
- Frankie Ballard

== Setlist ==
1. "Storm Warning"
2. "Can't Say Love"
3. "Faith to Fall Back On"
4. "Rainy Season"
5. "I'm Yours" (Jason Mraz cover)
6. "Somebody's Heartbreak"
7. "A Thing About You"
8. "Love Makes Me"
9. "Cry with You"
10. "All You Ever"
11. "In a Song" (acoustic)
12. "Somebody Like You" (Keith Urban cover)
13. "Everybody's Got Somebody but Me"
14. "On Top of the World" (Imagine Dragons cover)
15. "More Than I Should"
16. "Where We Left Off"
17. "Wanted"
18. "Light Me Up"
19. "Better Than This"
  Encore
20. "What You Gonna Do" (with Ashley Monroe)
21. "I Want Crazy"

== Tour dates ==
Date	City	Country	Venue
North America
October 10, 2013	Knoxville	United States	Knoxville Civic Auditorium
October 11, 2013	Savannah	United States	Johnny Mercer Theatre
October 17, 2013	Atlanta	United States	Fox Theatre
October 18, 2013	Nashville	United States	Ryman Auditorium
October 19, 2013	Nashville	United States	Ryman Auditorium
October 24, 2013	Muncie	United States	Emens Auditorium
October 25, 2013	Rosemont	United States	Rosemont Theatre
October 26, 2013	Louisville	United States	The Louisville Palace
November 1, 2013	Birmingham	United States	BJCC Concert Hall
November 2, 2013	Greensboro	United States	War Memorial Auditorium
November 8, 2013	Evansville	United States	The Centre – Aiken Theatre
November 9, 2013	Cleveland	United States	State Theatre
November 10, 2013	Detroit	United States	Fox Theatre
November 14, 2013	St. Louis	United States	Fabulous Fox Theatre
November 15, 2013	Sioux City	United States	Orpheum Theatre
November 16, 2013	Omaha	United States	Orpheum Theatre
November 20, 2013	Lafayette	United States	Heymann Performing Arts Center
November 21, 2013	Lafayette	United States	Heymann Performing Arts Center
November 22, 2013	Grand Prairie	United States	Verizon Theatre
November 23, 2013	Tulsa	United States	Brady Theater
December 4, 2013	Minneapolis	United States	Orpheum Theatre
December 5, 2013	Minneapolis	United States	Orpheum Theatre
December 6, 2013	Kansas City	United States	The Midland Theatre
December 7, 2013	Kansas City	United States	The Midland Theatre

=== Box office score data ===
Venue	City	Attendance	Gross revenue
Verizon Theatre	Grand Prairie	6,092 / 6,092 (100%)	$212,784
The Midland Theatre	Kansas City	5,092 / 5,208 (98%)	$198,214
Orpheum Theatre	Minneapolis	4,895 / 4,906 (99%)	$163,983
Brady Theatre	Tulsa	2,592/ 2,592 (100%)	$99,430
Orpheum Theatre	Omaha	2,474 / 2,474 (100%)	$94,937
The Louisville Palace	Louisville	2,592 / 2,592 (100%)	$100,634
Heymann Performing Arts Center	Lafayette	4,125 / 4,125 (100%)	$162,938
BJCC Concert Hall	Birmingham	2,687 / 2,687 (100%)	$95,043
War Memorial Auditorium	Greensboro	2,379 / 2,379 (100%)	$91,472
Civic Auditorium	Knoxville	2,343 / 2,343 (100%)	$88,985
Johnny Mercer Theatre	Savannah	2,392 / 2,392 (100%)	$92,342
Fox Theatre	Atlanta	4,256 / 4,256 (100%)	$152,584
