= Tattoo (Your Name) Tour =

2014 concert tour by Hunter Hayes

- Tour by Hunter Hayes
- Promotional poster for the tour
- Associated album: Storyline
- Start date: August 30, 2014
- End date: December 14, 2014
- Legs: 2
- No. of shows: 22

Hunter Hayes concert chronology
- 24 Hour Road Race to End Child Hunger (2014); Tattoo (Your Name) Tour (2014); 21 Tour (2015)

The Tattoo (Your Name) Tour was the fourth headlining concert tour by American country music singer Hunter Hayes, in support of his sophomore studio album, Storyline and began on August 30, 2014.

== Opening acts ==
- Dan + Shay
- The Railers
- Abby Stewart

== Setlist ==
1. "Storyline"
2. "Wild Card"
3. "Secret Love"
4. "Still Fallin'"
5. "Somebody's Heartbreak"
6. "Nothing Like Starting Over"
7. "Tattoo"
8. "Invisible"
9. "You Think You Know Somebody"
10. "Everybody's Got Somebody but Me"
11. "Flashlight"
12. "Light Me Up"
13. "Wanted"
14. "Love Makes Me"
15. "Counting Stars" (OneRepublic cover)
16. "Your Song" (Elton John cover)
17. "I Want Crazy"
  Encore
18. "Storm Warning"

== Tour dates ==
Date	City	Country	Venue	Opening act(s)
North America leg 1
August 30, 2014^{[A]}	Allentown	United States	Allentown Fairgrounds	The Railers
September 12, 2014^{[B]}	Allegan	United States	Allegan County Fairgrounds	The Railers
September 13, 2014^{[C]}	York	United States	York Fair	The Railers
September 17, 2014^{[D]}	Philadelphia	United States	Festival Pier at Penns Landing	The Railers
October 1, 2014	Boston	United States	House of Blues	The Railers
North America leg 2
October 28, 2014	New York City	United States	Best Buy Theater	—
October 30, 2014	University Park	United States	Bryce Jordan Center	Dan + Shay & The Railers
October 31, 2014	Albany	United States	Times Union Center	Dan + Shay & The Railers
November 1, 2014	Kingston	United States	Ryan Center	Dan + Shay & The Railers
November 13, 2014	Milwaukee	United States	BMO Harris Bradley Center	Dan + Shay & The Railers
November 14, 2014	Moline	United States	iWireless Center	Dan + Shay & The Railers
November 15, 2014	Kansas City	United States	Sprint Center	Dan + Shay & The Railers
November 20, 2014	St. Louis	United States	Chaifetz Arena	Dan + Shay & The Railers
November 21, 2014	Hoffman Estates	United States	Sears Centre	Dan + Shay & The Railers
November 22, 2014	Auburn Hills	United States	The Palace of Auburn Hills	Dan + Shay & The Railers
November 29, 2014	Grand Prairie	United States	Verizon Theatre at Grand Prairie	Dan + Shay & The Railers
December 4, 2014	New Orleans	United States	Lakefront Arena	Dan + Shay & The Railers
December 5, 2014	Jacksonville	United States	Jacksonville Veterans Memorial Arena	Dan + Shay & The Railers
December 6, 2014	Duluth	United States	Arena at Gwinnett Center	Dan + Shay & The Railers
December 11, 2014	Cleveland	United States	Wolstein Center	Dan + Shay & The Railers
December 12, 2014	Kingston	Canada	Rogers K-Rock Centre	Dan + Shay; Abby Stewart
December 13, 2014	London	Canada	Budweiser Gardens	Dan + Shay; Abby Stewart

=== Notes ===
- ^{A} The concert is a part of the Great Allentown Fair.
- ^{B} This concert is a part of the Allegan County Fair.
- ^{C} This concert is a part of the York Fair.
- ^{D} This concert is a part of the 92.5 WXTU's After School Special.

=== Box office score data ===
Venue	City	Tickets sold / available	Gross revenue
House of Blues	Boston	2,180 / 2,180	$56,046
Times Union Center	Albany	1,899 / 5,346	$74,058
Ryan Center	Kingston	3,906 / 5,247 (74%)	$152,192
i wireless Center	Moline	4,086 / 4,763	$112,608
Rogers K-Rock Centre	Kingston	3,205 / 3,906	$105,130
Budweiser Gardens	London	4,256 / 4,529	$148,868
