= We're Not Invisible Tour =

2014 concert tour by Hunter Hayes

- Tour by Hunter Hayes
- Location: North America
- Associated album: Hunter Hayes
- Start date: March 20, 2014
- End date: May 31, 2014
- No. of shows: 19

Hunter Hayes concert chronology
- Let's Be Crazy Tour (2013); We're Not Invisible Tour (2014); 24 Hour Road Race to End Child Hunger (2014)

The We're Not Invisible Tour was the third headlining tour by American country musician Hunter Hayes. The tour was opened by Dan + Shay and Danielle Bradbery. The tour began on March 20, 2014, in Pikeville, Kentucky and ended on May 31, 2014, in Estero, Florida.

== Setlist ==
1. "Somebody's Heartbreak"
2. "More Than I Should"
3. "Love Makes Me"
4. "Everybody's Got Somebody but Me"
5. "In a Song"
6. "If You Told Me To"
7. "What You Gonna Do"
8. "Endless Summer"
9. "Faith to Fall Back On"
10. "Counting Stars" (OneRepublic cover)
11. "Wanted"
12. "Light Me Up"
13. "Better Than This"
14. "Invisible"
  Encore
15. "I Want Crazy"

== Tour dates ==
Date	City	Country	Venue
North America
March 20, 2014	Pikeville	United States	Eastern Kentucky Exposition Center
March 21, 2014	Huntington	United States	Big Sandy Superstore Arena
March 22, 2014	Youngstown	United States	Covelli Centre
March 27, 2014	Peoria	United States	Peoria Civic Center
March 28, 2014	Toledo	United States	Huntington Center
April 10, 2014	Southaven	United States	Landers Center
April 11, 2014	Cape Girardeau	United States	Show Me Center
April 12, 2014	Springfield	United States	JQH Arena
April 17, 2014	Huntsville	United States	Von Braun Center Arena
April 18, 2014	Roanoke	United States	Roanoke Civic Center
April 19, 2014	Asheville	United States	U.S. Cellular Center
April 23, 2014	Colorado Springs	United States	Broadmoor World Arena
April 24, 2014	Orem	United States	UCCU Center
May 1, 2014	Bangor	United States	Cross Insurance Center
May 2, 2014	Lowell	United States	Tsongas Center at UMass Lowell
May 3, 2014	Uncasville	United States	Mohegan Sun Arena
May 29, 2014	Augusta	United States	James Brown Arena
May 30, 2014	Pensacola	United States	Pensacola Bay Center
May 31, 2014	Estero	United States	Germain Arena
