= Most Wanted Tour =

2011 concert tour by Hunter Hayes

- Tour by Hunter Hayes
- Location: North America
- Associated album: Hunter Hayes
- Start date: October 8, 2011
- End date: November 12, 2011
- No. of shows: 15

Hunter Hayes concert chronology
- Most Wanted Tour (2011); Let's Be Crazy Tour (2013)

The Most Wanted Tour was the debut headlining tour by American country musician Hunter Hayes. The tour was in support of Hayes' debut studio album titled Hunter Hayes.

== Setlist ==
1. "Light Me Up"
2. "Can't Say Love"
3. "Faith to Fall Back On"
4. "Somebody's Heartbreak"
5. "Rainy Season"
6. "Don't Let Our Love Start Slippin' Away" (Vince Gill cover)
7. "All You Ever"
8. "Cry with You" / "Shower the People" (James Taylor cover)
9. "What You Gonna Do"
10. "If You Told Me To"
11. "Everybody's Got Somebody but Me"
12. "Wanted"
13. "Keep Your Head Up" (Andy Grammer cover)
14. "Where We Left Off"
15. "Play" (Rascal Flatts cover)
16. "A Thing About You"
17. "Love Makes Me"
  Encore
18. "Love Makes Me"
19. "Somebody's Heartbreak"
20. "Storm Warning"
  Encore 2
21. "Just the Way You Are" (Bruno Mars cover)

== Tour dates ==
Date	City	Country	Venue
North America
October 8, 2011	Beaumont	United States	Ford Park
October 9, 2011	Gretna	United States	Gretna Heritage Festival
October 12, 2011	Foxborough	United States	Toby Keith's Bar & Grill
October 20, 2011	Columbus	United States	The Bluestone
October 21, 2011	Indianapolis	United States	The Earth House
October 22, 2011	Lexington	United States	Cosmic Charlie's
October 26, 2011	Detroit	United States	Clutch Cargo
October 27, 2011	Grand Rapids	United States	The Intersection
October 28, 2011	Cleveland	United States	House of Blues
October 29, 2011	Pittsburgh	United States	The Altar
November 2, 2011	Nashville	United States	12th & Porter
November 5, 2011	Sanford	United States	The Barn
November 6, 2011	Davie	United States	The Roundup
November 11, 2011	Milwaukee	United States	The Rave
November 12, 2011	Chicago	United States	House of Blues
