= 24 Hour Road Race to End Child Hunger =

2014 concert tour by Hunter Hayes

- Tour by Hunter Hayes
- Start date: May 9, 2014
- End date: May 10, 2014
- No. of shows: 10

Hunter Hayes concert chronology
- We're Not Invisible Tour (2014); 24 Hour Road Race to End Child Hunger (2014); Tattoo (Your Name) Tour (2014)

The 24 Hour Road Race to End Child Hunger was a mini date concert tour by American recording artist Hunter Hayes. The tour was notable because it broke the world record for the most live shows played in multiple cities in the span of 24 hours, with ten shows being played. According to the Guinness World Records, each city played had to be 31 miles apart. Half of the cities had to have a population of over 100,000 and all cities had to have a population of over 15,000. Also, Hayes was required to perform for fifteen continuous minutes at each show. The tour was in support of Hunters album Storyline.

== Set list ==
The following set list is representative of the Philadelphia show. It is not representative of all concerts for the duration of the tour.

1. "Storyline"
2. "Somebody's Heartbreak"
3. "Wanted"
4. "Tattoo"
5. "Invisible"
6. "I Want Crazy"

== Tour dates ==
Date	City	Country	Venue
North America
May 9, 2014	New York City	United States	Good Morning America
May 9, 2014	Boston	United States	Paradise Rock Club
May 9, 2014	Worcester	United States	Worcester Palladium
May 9, 2014	Providence	United States	Lupo's Heartbreak Hotel
May 9, 2014	New London	United States	Garde Arts Center
May 9, 2014	New Haven	United States	Toad's Place
May 9, 2014	Stamford	United States	Palace Theater
May 10, 2014	South Orange	United States	South Orange Performing Arts Center
May 10, 2014	Asbury Park	United States	The Stone Pony
May 10, 2014	Philadelphia	United States	Trocadero Theatre
