= Teen Choice Award for Choice Music – Country Song =

Entertainment award category

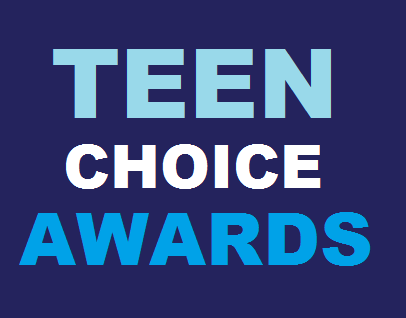
Teen Choice Awards Logo

The following is a list of Teen Choice Award winners and nominees for Choice Music – Country Song. In 2011, it was given out as Choice Music – Country Track but went back to its original title. Taylor Swift is the most awarded artist in this category with four wins.

== Winners and nominees ==
=== 2010s ===
Year	Winner	Nominees	Ref.
2010	"Fifteen" – Taylor Swift	"The House That Built Me" – Miranda Lambert; "Need You Now" – Lady Antebellum; "Undo It" – Carrie Underwood; "Water" – Brad Paisley	
2011	"Mean" – Taylor Swift	"Country Girl (Shake It for Me)" – Luke Bryan; "Honey Bee" – Blake Shelton; "If I Die Young" – The Band Perry; "Just a Kiss" – Lady Antebellum	
2012	"Sparks Fly" – Taylor Swift	"Crazy Girl" – Eli Young Band; "God Gave Me You" – Blake Shelton; "Storm Warning" – Hunter Hayes; "Tattoos on This Town" – Jason Aldean	
2013	"We Are Never Ever Getting Back Together" – Taylor Swift	"Boys 'Round Here" – Blake Shelton featuring Pistol Annies and Friends; "Crash My Party" – Luke Bryan; "Cruise" – Florida Georgia Line; "I Want Crazy" – Hunter Hayes	
2014	"This Is How We Roll" – Florida Georgia Line featuring Luke Bryan	"Bartender" – Lady Antebellum; "Beachin'" – Jake Owen; "Play It Again" – Luke Bryan; "Somethin' Bad" – Miranda Lambert and Carrie Underwood	
2015	"Little Toy Guns" – Carrie Underwood	"21" – Hunter Hayes; "Kick the Dust Up" – Luke Bryan; "Sippin' on Fire" – Florida Georgia Line; "Take Your Time" – Sam Hunt; "That Ghost" – Megan and Liz	
2016	"Without a Fight" – Brad Paisley featuring Demi Lovato	"Church Bells" – Carrie Underwood; "Go Ahead and Break My Heart" – Blake Shelton featuring Gwen Stefani; "H.O.L.Y." – Florida Georgia Line; "Make You Miss Me" – Sam Hunt; "Peter Pan" – Kelsea Ballerini	
2017	"Body Like a Back Road" – Sam Hunt	"Craving You" – Thomas Rhett featuring Maren Morris; "Every Time I Hear That Song" – Blake Shelton; "The Fighter" – Keith Urban featuring Carrie Underwood; "God, Your Mama, and Me" – Florida Georgia Line featuring Backstreet Boys; "In Case You Didn't Know" – Brett Young	
2018	"Meant to Be" – Bebe Rexha featuring Florida Georgia Line	"Cry Pretty" – Carrie Underwood; "Heaven" – Kane Brown; "Life Changes" – Thomas Rhett; "Mercy" – Brett Young; "Most People Are Good" – Luke Bryan	
2019	"Speechless" – Dan + Shay	"Girl" – Maren Morris; "Good as You" – Kane Brown; "Look What God Gave Her" – Thomas Rhett; "Miss Me More" – Kelsea Ballerini; "Rainbow" – Kacey Musgraves	

== Winning Records ==
Taylor Swift has won the most times in this category, with four consecutive wins. Blake Shelton and Luke Bryan have each received over five nominations in the category.
