= Through My Eyes =

Through My Eyes may refer to:

- Through My Eyes (album), a 2007 album by Erica Baxter
- Through My Eyes, a 2004 album by Fabrizio Sotti
- Through My Eyes, a 2000 album by Hunter Hayes
- Through My Eyes (miniseries), 2004 Australian television crime drama
