= 2013 Teen Choice Awards =

American awards ceremony held in California

- Date: August 11, 2013
- Location: Gibson Amphitheatre, Universal City, California
- Hosted by: Lucy Hale; Darren Criss

Television/radio coverage
- Network: Fox

The 2013 Teen Choice Awards ceremony was held on August 11, 2013, at the Gibson Amphitheatre, Universal City, California. The awards celebrate the year's achievements in music, film, television, sports, fashion, comedy, and the Internet, and are voted on by viewers living in the US, aged 13 and over through various social media sites. This was the last Teen Choice Award ceremony to take place at the Gibson Amphitheatre due to the venue closing down in September 2013, to make room for The Wizarding World of Harry Potter. The Twilight Saga: Breaking Dawn – Part 2 won eight of its nine nominations, Pretty Little Liars won all of its seven nominations, pushing the series' total to eighteen Teen Choice Awards, Pitch Perfect won four of its eleven, Glee won four and Bruno Mars won two of their eight, respectively, Taylor Swift won two of her seven, and Demi Lovato won four of her six, One Direction won all six of their nominations (including the awards received by Harry Styles), remaining undefeated at the Teen Choice Awards, Selena Gomez won three of her six nominations and Miley Cyrus won three of her six nominations. Miley Cyrus took home the "Candie's Fashion Trendsetter" award.

== Performers ==
- One Direction – "Best Song Ever"
- Florida Georgia Line featuring Nelly – "Cruise"
- Demi Lovato with Nick Jonas – "Made in the USA"
- Paramore – "Still Into You"

== Presenters ==
- Liam Hemsworth — presented Choice Movie Comedy: Actor and Actress and introduced Pitch Perfect cast
- Christopher Mintz-Plasse and Chloë Grace Moretz — presented Choice Music: Break-Up Song
- Bridgit Mendler and Tyler Posey — presented Choice TV Show: Drama
- Candice Glover, Joey King and Bella Thorne — introduced Florida Georgia Line and Nelly
- Erin Andrews and Cody Simpson – presented Choice Female Athlete
- Demi Lovato – introduced Fifth Harmony
- Fifth Harmony — presented Acuvue Inspire Award
- Lily Collins and Max Greenfield — presented Choice TV Show: Comedy and introduced Lea Michele
- Abigail Breslin and Hailee Steinfeld — presented Choice Movie Actor: Drama
- Michelle Rodriguez and Russell Westbrook — introduced Demi Lovato
- Josh Gad — presented Ultimate Choice
- Ian Somerhalder and Kerry Washington — presented Choice TV Actor: Comedy
- Nina Dobrev and Simon Helberg — introduced Paramore
- Ross Lynch and Maia Mitchell — presented Choice Summer Song and introduced Little Mix
- Little Mix — presented Candie's Trendsetter
- Emblem3 and Laura Marano — introduced Bruno Mars
- LL Cool J and Ed Sheeran — presented Choice TV: Female Personality
- Alexandra Daddario, Brandon T. Jackson, Logan Lerman and Leven Rambin — presented Choice Summer Movie Star: Female

== Winners and nominees ==
The nominees were announced on May 22, 2013, and further nominees were announced on July 1, 2013, and July 16, 2013. Winners are listed first and highlighted in bold text.

=== Movies ===
Choice Movie: Action	Choice Movie Actor: Action
**Iron Man 3**; The Bourne Legacy; The Dark Knight Rises; G.I. Joe: Retaliation; Skyfall	**Robert Downey Jr. – Iron Man 3**; Christian Bale – The Dark Knight Rises; Daniel Craig – Skyfall; Chris Hemsworth – Red Dawn; Dwayne Johnson – G.I. Joe: Retaliation
Choice Movie Actress: Action	Choice Movie: Sci-Fi/Fantasy
**Anne Hathaway – The Dark Knight Rises**; Jessica Biel – Total Recall; Adrianne Palicki – G.I. Joe: Retaliation; Gwyneth Paltrow – Iron Man 3; Rachel Weisz – The Bourne Legacy	**The Twilight Saga: Breaking Dawn – Part 2**; Beautiful Creatures; Iron Man 3; Oblivion; Oz the Great and Powerful
Choice Movie Actor: Sci-Fi/Fantasy	Choice Movie Actress: Sci-Fi/Fantasy
**Taylor Lautner – The Twilight Saga: Breaking Dawn – Part 2**; Tom Cruise – Oblivion; Robert Downey Jr. – Iron Man 3; James Franco – Oz the Great and Powerful; Robert Pattinson – The Twilight Saga: Breaking Dawn – Part 2	**Kristen Stewart – The Twilight Saga: Breaking Dawn – Part 2**; Mila Kunis – Oz the Great and Powerful; Gwyneth Paltrow – Iron Man 3; Saoirse Ronan – The Host; Michelle Williams – Oz the Great and Powerful
Choice Movie: Drama	Choice Movie Actor: Drama
**The Perks of Being a Wallflower**; Argo; The Great Gatsby; The Impossible; Les Misérables	**Logan Lerman – The Perks of Being a Wallflower**; Ben Affleck – Argo; Bradley Cooper – The Words; Leonardo DiCaprio – The Great Gatsby; Hugh Jackman – Les Misérables
Choice Movie Actress: Drama	Choice Movie: Comedy
**Emma Watson – The Perks of Being a Wallflower**; Halle Berry – The Call; Anne Hathaway – Les Misérables; Carey Mulligan – The Great Gatsby; Naomi Watts – The Impossible	**Pitch Perfect**; Identity Thief; The Incredible Burt Wonderstone; Peeples; Warm Bodies
Choice Movie Actor: Comedy	Choice Movie Actress: Comedy
**Skylar Astin – Pitch Perfect**; Jason Bateman – Identity Thief; Steve Carell – The Incredible Burt Wonderstone; Nicholas Hoult – Warm Bodies; Craig Robinson – Peeples	**Rebel Wilson – Pitch Perfect**; Anna Kendrick – Pitch Perfect; Melissa McCarthy – Identity Thief; Kerry Washington – Peeples; Olivia Wilde – The Incredible Burt Wonderstone
Choice Movie: Romance	Choice Movie Actor: Romance
**The Twilight Saga: Breaking Dawn – Part 2**; Beautiful Creatures; Les Misérables; Safe Haven; Warm Bodies	**Robert Pattinson – The Twilight Saga: Breaking Dawn – Part 2**; Josh Duhamel – Safe Haven; Alden Ehrenreich – Beautiful Creatures; Nicholas Hoult – Warm Bodies; Eddie Redmayne – Les Misérables
Choice Movie Actress: Romance	Choice Movie: Villain
**Kristen Stewart – The Twilight Saga: Breaking Dawn – Part 2**; Jessica Biel – Playing for Keeps; Alice Englert – Beautiful Creatures; Julianne Hough – Safe Haven; Amanda Seyfried – Les Misérables	**Adam DeVine – Pitch Perfect**; Javier Bardem – Skyfall; Tom Hardy – The Dark Knight Rises; Ben Kingsley – Iron Man 3; Melissa McCarthy – Identity Thief
Choice Movie: Scene Stealer	Choice Movie: Breakout
**Kellan Lutz – The Twilight Saga: Breaking Dawn – Part 2**; Joseph Gordon-Levitt – The Dark Knight Rises; Hana Mae Lee – Pitch Perfect; Ben Platt – Pitch Perfect; Channing Tatum – G.I. Joe: Retaliation	**Nicholas Hoult – Warm Bodies**; Adam DeVine – Pitch Perfect; Alice Englert – Beautiful Creatures; Ezra Miller – The Perks of Being a Wallflower; Eddie Redmayne – Les Misérables
Choice Movie: Chemistry	Choice Movie: Liplock
**Sandra Bullock and Melissa McCarthy – The Heat**; Don Cheadle and Robert Downey Jr. – Iron Man 3; Johnny Depp and Armie Hammer – The Lone Ranger; Vin Diesel, Dwayne Johnson and Paul Walker – Fast & Furious 6; Jamie Foxx and Channing Tatum – White House Down	**Robert Pattinson and Kristen Stewart – The Twilight Saga: Breaking Dawn – Part 2**; Amy Adams and Henry Cavill – Man of Steel; Skylar Astin and Anna Kendrick – Pitch Perfect; Alden Ehrenreich and Alice Englert – Beautiful Creatures; Logan Lerman and Emma Watson – The Perks of Being a Wallflower
Choice Movie: Hissy Fit	Choice Summer Movie: Action
**Taylor Lautner – Grown Ups 2**; Anna Camp, Hana Mae Lee, Brittany Snow and Rebel Wilson – Pitch Perfect; Steve Carell – Despicable Me 2; Melissa McCarthy – The Heat; Channing Tatum – White House Down	**Fast & Furious 6**; Man of Steel; Pacific Rim; White House Down; World War Z
Choice Summer Movie: Comedy
**Despicable Me 2**; Grown Ups 2; The Heat; The Internship; Monsters University
Choice Summer Movie Star: Male	Choice Summer Movie Star: Female
**Channing Tatum – White House Down**; Henry Cavill – Man of Steel; Johnny Depp – The Lone Ranger; Dwayne Johnson – Fast & Furious 6; Chris Pine – Star Trek Into Darkness	**Sandra Bullock – The Heat**; Amy Adams – Man of Steel; Melissa McCarthy – The Heat; Michelle Rodriguez – Fast & Furious 6; Zoe Saldaña – Star Trek Into Darkness

=== Television ===
Choice TV Show: Drama	Choice TV Actor: Drama
**Pretty Little Liars**; Gossip Girl; Nashville; Revenge; Switched at Birth	**Ian Harding – Pretty Little Liars**; Penn Badgley – Gossip Girl; Josh Bowman – Revenge; Lucas Grabeel – Switched at Birth; Nick Wechsler – Revenge
Choice TV Actress: Drama	Choice TV Show: Fantasy/Sci-fi
**Troian Bellisario – Pretty Little Liars**; Blake Lively – Gossip Girl; Vanessa Marano – Switched at Birth; Hayden Panettiere – Nashville; Emily VanCamp – Revenge	**The Vampire Diaries**; Arrow; Beauty & the Beast; Once Upon a Time; Supernatural
Choice TV Actor: Fantasy/Sci-Fi	Choice TV Actress: Fantasy/Sci-Fi
**Ian Somerhalder – The Vampire Diaries**; Jensen Ackles – Supernatural; Stephen Amell – Arrow; Jared Padalecki – Supernatural; Paul Wesley – The Vampire Diaries	**Nina Dobrev – The Vampire Diaries**; Katie Cassidy – Arrow; Ginnifer Goodwin – Once Upon a Time; Kat Graham – The Vampire Diaries; Kristin Kreuk – Beauty & the Beast
Choice TV Show: Action	Choice TV Actor: Action
**NCIS: Los Angeles**; Chicago Fire; Elementary; Hawaii Five-0; Nikita	**LL Cool J – NCIS: Los Angeles**; Scott Caan – Hawaii Five-0; Jonny Lee Miller – Elementary; Jesse Spencer – Chicago Fire; Shane West – Nikita
Choice TV Actress: Action	Choice TV Show: Comedy
**Lucy Liu – Elementary**; Lyndsy Fonseca – Nikita; Grace Park – Hawaii Five-0; Maggie Q – Nikita; Monica Raymund – Chicago Fire	**Glee**; The Big Bang Theory; Modern Family; New Girl; Suburgatory
Choice TV Actor: Comedy	Choice TV Actress: Comedy
**Jim Parsons – The Big Bang Theory**; Chris Colfer – Glee; Jake Johnson – New Girl; Ashton Kutcher – Two and a Half Men; Eric Stonestreet – Modern Family	**Lea Michele – Glee**; Kaley Cuoco – The Big Bang Theory; Zooey Deschanel – New Girl; Mindy Kaling – The Mindy Project; Bridgit Mendler – Good Luck Charlie
Choice TV Show: Animated	Choice TV Show: Reality Competition
**The Simpsons**; Adventure Time; Bob's Burgers; Family Guy; Gravity Falls	**The X Factor**; American Idol; The Bachelor; Dancing with the Stars; The Voice
Choice TV Show: Reality	Choice TV: Male Personality
**Keeping Up with the Kardashians**; Dance Moms; Here Comes Honey Boo Boo; Married to Jonas; Tia & Tamera	**Simon Cowell – The X Factor**; Nick Cannon – America's Got Talent; Adam Levine – The Voice; Ryan Seacrest – American Idol; Blake Shelton – The Voice
Choice TV: Female Personality	Choice TV: Villain
**Demi Lovato – The X Factor**; Erin Andrews – Fox Sports; Cat Deeley – So You Think You Can Dance; Carrie Ann Inaba – Dancing with the Stars; Heidi Klum – America's Got Talent	**Janel Parrish – Pretty Little Liars**; Carly Chaikin – Suburgatory; Joseph Morgan – The Vampire Diaries; Lana Parrilla – Once Upon a Time; Becca Tobin – Glee
Choice TV: Male Reality Star	Choice TV: Female Reality Star
**Kevin Jonas – Married to Jonas**; Ryan Lochte – What Would Ryan Lochte Do?; Gordon Ramsay – Hell's Kitchen and MasterChef; The Robertsons – Duck Dynasty; The Wanted – The Wanted Life	**The Kardashians and The Jenners – Keeping Up with the Kardashians**; Honey Boo Boo – Here Comes Honey Boo Boo; Danielle Jonas – Married to Jonas; Abby Lee Miller – Dance Moms; Tia Mowry and Tamera Mowry – Tia & Tamera
Choice TV: Breakout Star	Choice TV: Breakout Show
**Blake Jenner – Glee**; Stephen Amell – Arrow; Melissa Benoist – Glee; AnnaSophia Robb – The Carrie Diaries; Derek Theler – Baby Daddy	**The Fosters**; Arrow; Baby Daddy; The Carrie Diaries; The Mindy Project
Choice TV: Male Scene Stealer	Choice TV: Female Scene Stealer
**Chord Overstreet – Glee**; Max Greenfield – New Girl; Steven R. McQueen – The Vampire Diaries; Tahj Mowry – Baby Daddy; Rico Rodriguez – Modern Family	**Miley Cyrus – Two and a Half Men**; Candice Accola – The Vampire Diaries; Heather Morris – Glee; Eden Sher – The Middle; Ariel Winter – Modern Family
Choice Summer TV Show
**Pretty Little Liars**; The Fosters; So You Think You Can Dance; Teen Wolf; Under the Dome
Choice Summer TV Star: Male	Choice Summer TV Star: Female
**Keegan Allen – Pretty Little Liars**; Jake T. Austin – The Fosters; Jean-Luc Bilodeau – Baby Daddy; Avan Jogia – Twisted; Tyler Posey – Teen Wolf	**Lucy Hale – Pretty Little Liars**; Maddie Hasson – Twisted; Chelsea Kane – Baby Daddy; Katie Leclerc – Switched at Birth; Maia Mitchell – The Fosters

=== Music ===
Choice Music: Male Artist	Choice Music: Female Artist
**Justin Bieber**; Bruno Mars; Phillip Phillips; Pitbull; Justin Timberlake	**Demi Lovato**; Selena Gomez; P!nk; Rihanna; Taylor Swift
Choice Music: Group	Choice Music: R&B Artist
**One Direction**; Big Time Rush; fun.; Maroon 5; The Wanted	**Bruno Mars**; Beyoncé; Alicia Keys; Miguel; Trey Songz
Choice Music: Hip-Hop/Rap Artist	Choice Music: Rock Group
**Macklemore & Ryan Lewis**; Drake; Nicki Minaj; Pitbull; Kanye West	**Paramore**; AWOLNATION; Imagine Dragons; The Lumineers; Mumford & Sons
Choice Music: Electronic Dance Music Artist	Choice Music: Country Group
**David Guetta**; deadmau5; Calvin Harris; Kaskade; Skrillex; Swedish House Mafia	**Lady Antebellum**; The Band Perry; Florida Georgia Line; Little Big Town; Thompson Square
Choice Music Country Artist: Male	Choice Music Country Artist: Female
**Hunter Hayes**; Jason Aldean; Luke Bryan; Eric Church; Blake Shelton	**Taylor Swift**; Jana Kramer; Miranda Lambert; Kacey Musgraves; Carrie Underwood
Choice Music Single: Male	Choice Music Single: Female
**"Beauty and a Beat" – Justin Bieber featuring Nicki Minaj**; "Blurred Lines" – Robin Thicke featuring Pharrell; "Feel This Moment" – Pitbull featuring Christina Aguilera; "Locked Out of Heaven" – Bruno Mars; "Suit & Tie" – Justin Timberlake featuring Jay Z	**"Heart Attack" – Demi Lovato**; "Come & Get It" – Selena Gomez; "Cups (Pitch Perfect's 'When I'm Gone')" – Anna Kendrick; "I Knew You Were Trouble" – Taylor Swift; "We Can't Stop" – Miley Cyrus
Choice Music Single: Group	Choice Music: R&B/Hip-Hop Song
**"Live While We're Young" – One Direction**; "Get Lucky" – Daft Punk featuring Pharrell Williams; "I Love It" – Icona Pop featuring Charli XCX; "Love Somebody" – Maroon 5; "Thrift Shop" – Macklemore & Ryan Lewis featuring Wanz	**"Can't Hold Us" – Macklemore & Ryan Lewis featuring Ray Dalton**; "#Beautiful" – Mariah Carey; "Diamonds" – Rihanna; "Next To Me" – Emeli Sandé; "Started from the Bottom" – Drake
Choice Music: Rock Song	Choice Music: Love Song
**"Radioactive" – Imagine Dragons**; "Carry On" – fun.; "Gone, Gone, Gone" – Phillip Phillips; "Ho Hey" – The Lumineers; "Sail" – AWOLNATION	**"Little Things" – One Direction**; "Just Give Me a Reason" – P!nk featuring Nate Ruess; "Mirrors" – Justin Timberlake; "Treasure" – Bruno Mars; "The Way" – Ariana Grande featuring Mac Miller
Choice Music: Country Song	Choice Music: Break-Up Song
**"We Are Never Ever Getting Back Together" – Taylor Swift**; "Boys 'Round Here" – Blake Shelton featuring Pistol Annies and Friends; "Crash My Party" – Luke Bryan; "Cruise" – Florida Georgia Line; "I Want Crazy" – Hunter Hayes	**"Come & Get It" – Selena Gomez**; "DONE." – The Band Perry; "Stay" – Rihanna featuring Mikky Ekko; "We Are Never Ever Getting Back Together" – Taylor Swift; "When I Was Your Man" – Bruno Mars
Choice Music: Breakout Artist	Choice Music: Breakout Group
**Ed Sheeran**; Candice Glover; Ariana Grande; Psy; Emeli Sandé	**Emblem3**; Icona Pop; Imagine Dragons; The Lumineers; Macklemore & Ryan Lewis
Choice Summer Song	Choice Summer Music Star: Male
**"We Can't Stop" – Miley Cyrus**; "Blurred Lines" – Robin Thicke featuring Pharrell Williams and T.I.; "Cruise (REMIX)" – Florida Georgia Line featuring Nelly; "Get Lucky" – Daft Punk featuring Pharrell Williams; "Treasure" – Bruno Mars	**Bruno Mars**; Jay Z; Pitbull; Robin Thicke; Justin Timberlake
Choice Summer Music Star: Female	Choice Summer Music Star: Group
**Selena Gomez**; Miley Cyrus; Ariana Grande; P!nk; Rihanna	**Maroon 5**; Daft Punk; Florida Georgia Line; Imagine Dragons; Macklemore & Ryan Lewis
Choice Summer Tour
**Take Me Home Tour – One Direction**; Legends of the Summer Tour – Jay Z and Justin Timberlake; The Moonshine Jungle Tour – Bruno Mars; The Mrs. Carter Show World Tour – Beyoncé; Red Tour 2013 – Taylor Swift

=== Fashion ===
Choice Male Hottie	Choice Female Hottie
**Harry Styles**; Justin Bieber; Liam Hemsworth; Taylor Lautner; Channing Tatum	**Selena Gomez**; Miley Cyrus; Megan Fox; Mila Kunis; Demi Lovato
Choice Style Icon	Choice Smile
**Demi Lovato**; Miley Cyrus; Ariana Grande; Lea Michele; Emma Watson	**Harry Styles**; Selena Gomez; Taylor Lautner; Demi Lovato; Taylor Swift

=== Sports ===
Choice Male Athlete	Choice Female Athlete
**David Beckham**; LeBron James; Colin Kaepernick; Michael Phelps; Shaun White	**Gabby Douglas**; Missy Franklin; Alex Morgan; Danica Patrick; Lindsey Vonn; Serena Williams

=== Miscellaneous ===
Choice Comedian	Choice Social Network
**Ellen DeGeneres**; Jimmy Fallon; Melissa McCarthy; Daniel Tosh; Rebel Wilson	**Twitter**; Facebook; Instagram; Tumblr; Vine
Choice Twitter Personality	Choice Web Star
**Justin Bieber**; Lady Gaga; Barack Obama; Katy Perry; Rihanna	**Cimorelli**; Ryan Beatty; Dave Days; Kid President; The Screaming Sheep
Fashion Trendsetter	Ultimate Choice
**Miley Cyrus**	**Ashton Kutcher**

== Ratings ==
In its original Fox broadcast on August 11, 2013, the ceremony was viewed by 2.62 million viewers.
