= Levi Hummon =

American country musician

Levi Hummon is an American country musician. Hummon is the son of fellow country musician Marcus Hummon. Levi Hummon released his first self-titled EP in 2016. In 2018, he released his second EP titled Patient. Hummon has opened for country music artists Tim McGraw, Keith Urban, and Lady Antebellum and performed multiple shows at the Grand Ole Opry. In 2019, he launched his first headlining tour, the Drop of Us Tour with 16 tour dates across the United States. In 2019, he released his single, "State I'm In."

In 2019, Hummon was named the face of Amazon Music's official Introducing: Country playlist along with the cover of Spotify’s Hot Country playlist. He opened for Hunter Hayes on the Closer to You Tour.

== Personal life ==
Hummon married Kearsten Kochan at the Key Largo Lighthouse in Key Largo, Florida on June 14, 2025. They were in engaged in May 2024.

== Discography ==
=== Extended plays ===
List of extended plays, showing relevant details
Title	Details
Levi Hummon	Released: April 1, 2016; Label: Big Machine; Format: Digital download, streaming
Patient	Released: October 26, 2018; Label: Iconic; Format: Digital download, streaming

=== Singles ===
==== As lead artist ====
Title	Year	Album
"Guts and Glory"	2016	Levi Hummon
"Don't Waste the Night"	2017	Non-album single
"Stupid"	2017	Non-album single
"Love Heals" (with Alison Krauss)	2018	Non-album single
"Songs We Sang"	2018	Patient
"Change My Life"	2018	Patient
"Night Lights"	2019	Non-album single
"Drop of Us"	2019	Non-album single
"State I'm In"	2019	Non-album single
"Cowboy Take Me Away" (featuring Runaway June)	2019	Non-album single
"Wedding Dress"	2020	Non-album single
"Hallelujah"	2020	Non-album single
"Fast Car"	2020	Non-album single
"The Story"	2020	Non-album single
"Rock and Roses"	2020	Non-album single
"Good Taste"	2020	Non-album single
"White Christmas"	2020	Non-album single
"A Home"	2021	Non-album single
"Paying For It" (featuring Walker Hayes)	2021	Non-album single
"Bottled Up"	2022	Non-album single
"For Me"	2022	Non-album single
"Good Riddance" (featuring Filmore and YA'BOYZ)	2022	Non-album single
"Drink On"	2022	Non-album single
"RSVP" (featuring Cassadee Pope)	2022	Non-album single
"Rent Free"	2023	Non-album single
"Rock Bottom" (featuring Sam Tinnesz)	2023	Non-album single
"Another Shot"	2024	Non-album single

==== As featured artist ====
Title	Year	Peak chart positions	Album
Title	Year	CAN Country	Album
"We Should Be Together" (with Kira Isabella)	2019	42	Sides
