= Hunter Hayes =

American singer-songwriter and record producer

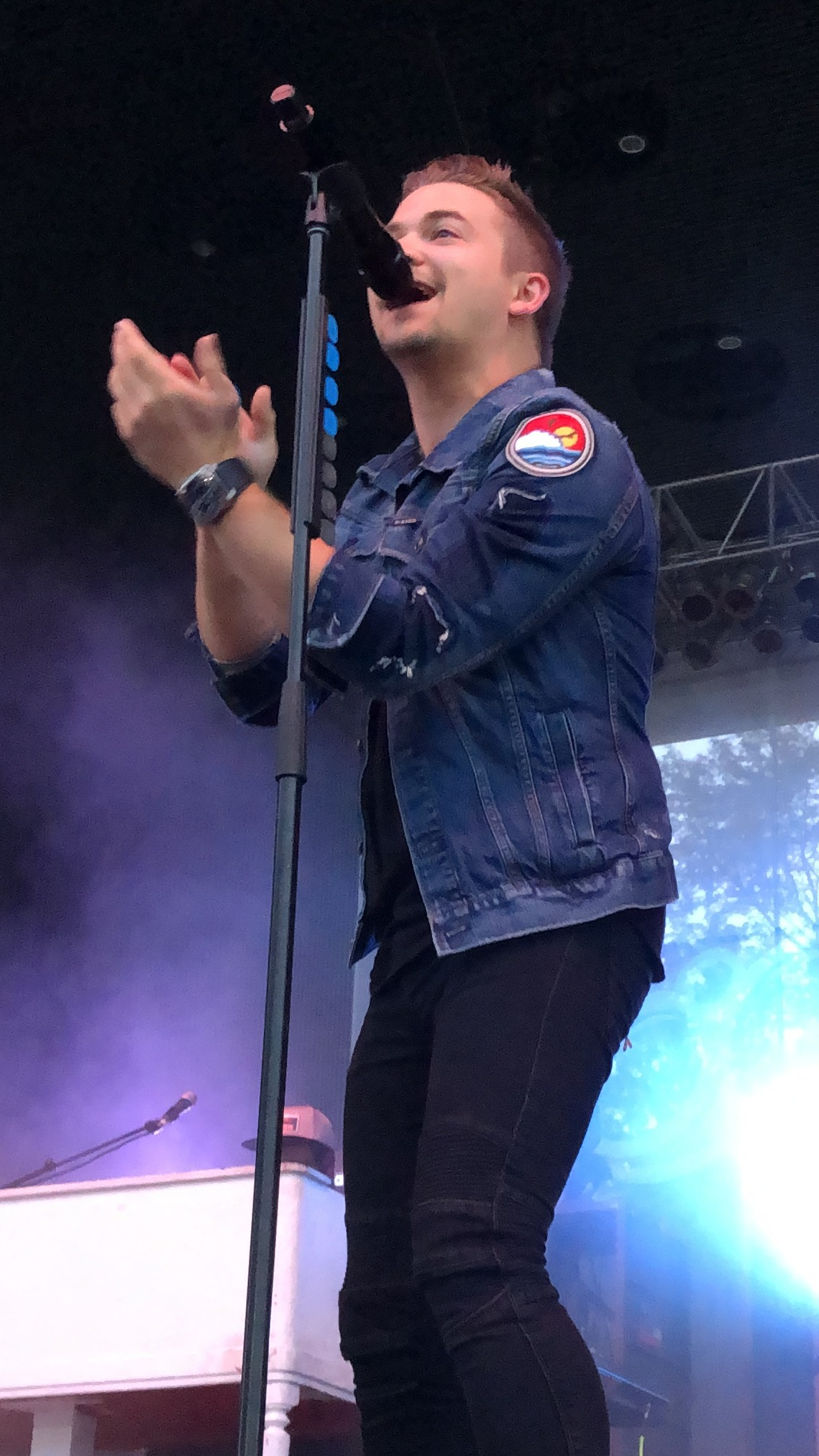
- Hayes performing in August 2019

Background information
- Born: Hunter Easton Hayes; September 9, 1991 (age 35); Breaux Bridge, Louisiana, U.S.
- Genres: Country pop; R&B; blues; pop; country; cajun; pop rock; alternative rock
- Occupations: Singer; songwriter; record producer; multi-instrumentalist
- Instruments: Vocals; guitar; piano; accordion
- Years active: 1993–present
- Labels: Atlantic Nashville; Warner Nashville; LP Entertainment
- Website: hunterhayes.com

Hunter Easton Hayes (born September 9, 1991) is an American multi-genre singer, songwriter, record producer, and multi-instrumentalist. He is proficient at more than 30 instruments.

Hayes released his self-titled debut album in 2011. It reached number seven on the Billboard 200 and number one on the Top Country Albums, and sold over 1.1 million copies. Its most successful single, "Wanted", sold over 3.5 million copies and made Hayes the youngest male act to ever top the Billboard Hot Country Songs.

Hayes' commercial success and his talent both as a songwriter and instrumentalist prompted Billboard to call him the leader of "Country Music's Youth Revolution" in 2014. He has been nominated for five Grammy Awards including Best New Artist, and won the 2012 CMA Award for New Artist of the Year and three BMI Awards.

== Life and career ==
Hayes was born on September 9, 1991, in Breaux Bridge, Louisiana; he is an only child. His parents both have French Cajun ancestry, along with small amounts of English, Scots-Irish, and German. He grew up Catholic, singing songs in both English and French.

Hayes started performing when he was 2. At 4, he began making appearances locally and on national television, including Maury, Rosie O'Donnell Show, and the Nickelodeon game show Figure It Out, where he performed "Jambalaya (On the Bayou)". The Advocate writes that Hayes received his first guitar from actor Robert Duvall on his 5th birthday. "Duvall not only attended the birthday party but presented the young musician with a beginner guitar and amplifier". At age 7, he was invited to perform for President Bill Clinton for a White House lawn party. At 13, he appeared on America's Most Talented Kids, a show hosted by Dave Coulier; he performed the hit Hank Williams song, "Hey Good Lookin'". At age 9, Hunter released his debut independent studio album "Through My Eyes" on October 8, 2000, under Sugartown Records and Louisiana Red Hot Records. He released several more independent albums: Make a Wish in 2001, Holidays with Hunter in 2003, Honoring our French Heritage in 2006, and Songs About Nothing in 2008.

In 2008, he moved from Breaux Bridge to Nashville, Tennessee, and signed with Universal Music Publishing Group as a songwriter. In 2010, Hayes co-wrote "Play" for the Rascal Flatts album Nothing Like This. In September, he was signed to Atlantic Records Nashville and began working on what would become his major-label debut.

Hayes appeared as the opening act of 10 dates of country star Taylor Swift's Speak Now World Tour throughout the summer of 2011 and concluded his leg of the tour in St. Louis, Missouri. In April 2011, he went on his own radio tour where he debuted songs that would appear on his debut album. His debut headlining tour was the Most Wanted Tour; the first leg of the tour began on October 8, 2011, in Beaumont, Texas, and ended on December 4, 2011, in San Bernardino, California.

Hayes and singer Victoria Justice contributed a duet to the soundtrack of 2011's Footloose remake, recording a cover of Mike Reno's and Ann Wilson's 1984 hit "Almost Paradise" from the original film. From January to February 2012, Hayes was the opening act on the Rascal Flatts "Thaw Out" tour.

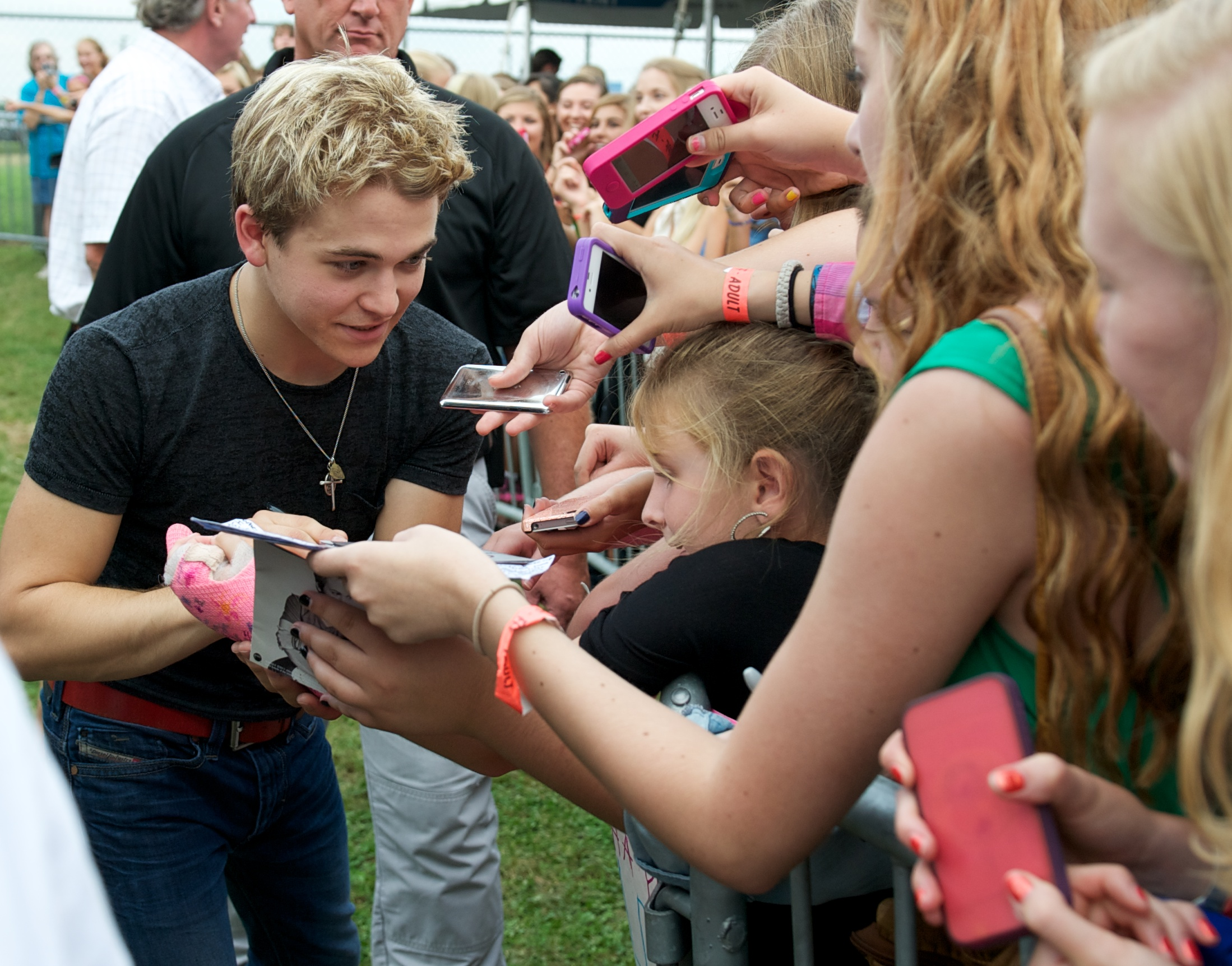
Hayes signing autographs in Frederick, Maryland in August 2012

"Where We Left Off" is an original song, written by Hayes, that can be heard on the soundtrack for the 2012 war film Act of Valor.

During the 2012 O Music Awards, The Flaming Lips broke a Guinness World Record (previously held by Jay-Z) for most concerts played in multiple cities in a 24-hr. period. Hayes was the opening act for them at the Hattiesburg stop.

In May 2012, Martin Guitars named Hayes as C.F. Martin & Co.'s newest brand ambassador. American Songwriter quoted Hayes on the subject: "It is an absolute honor to be named an official Martin Ambassador and to be recognized by the Martin family."

On September 7, 2012, he was inducted at the Mahalia Jackson Theater in New Orleans, Louisiana, into the Louisiana Music Hall of Fame.

=== 2011–2014: Hunter Hayes and Storyline ===
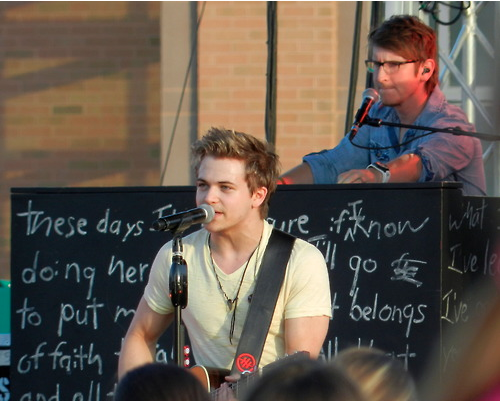
Hayes performing in 2013

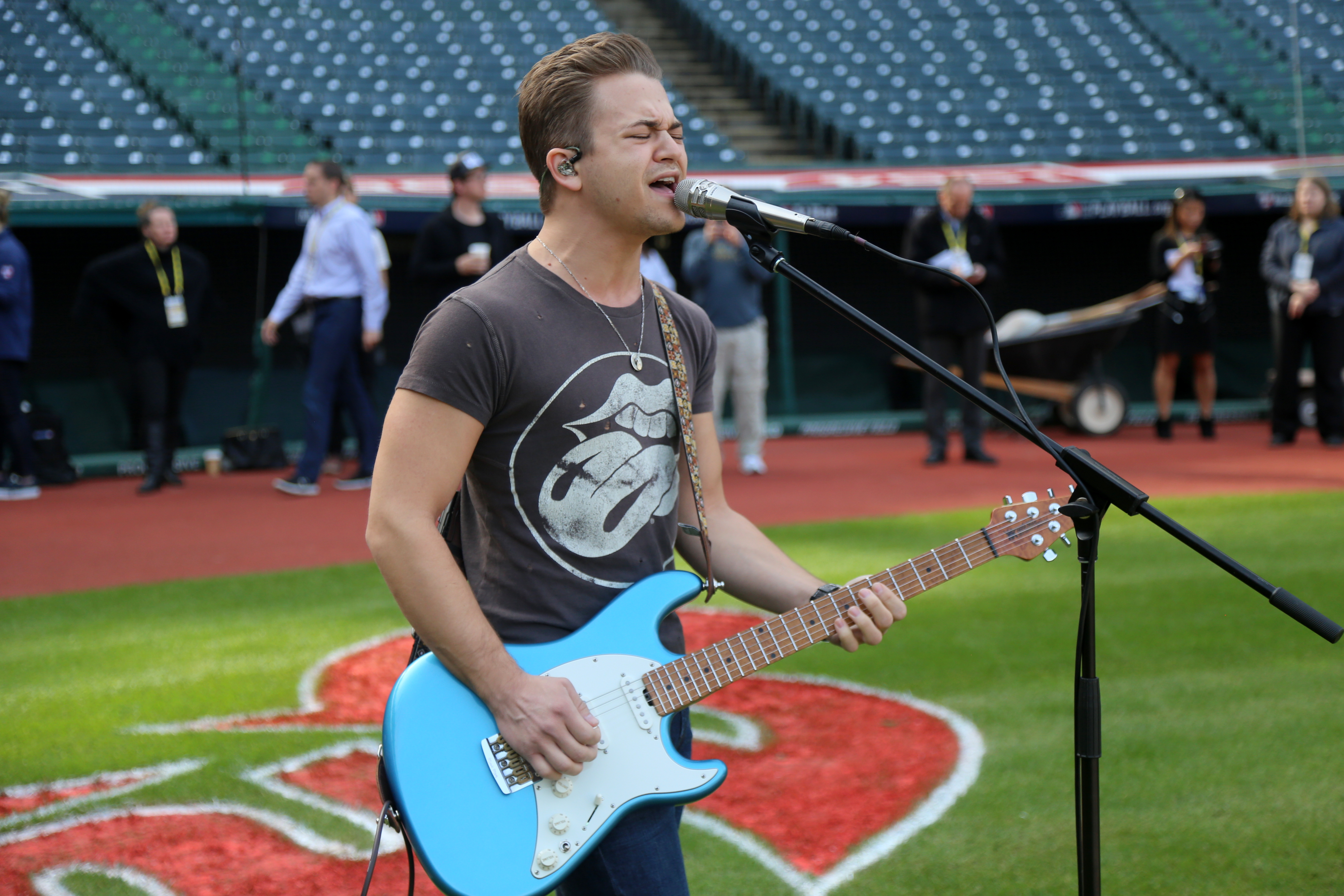
Hayes doing a soundcheck at Progressive Field in preparation for his performance of the US national anthem at Game 6 of the 2016 World Series

Hayes's debut single, "Storm Warning", released to radio on May 16, 2011. His self-titled major-label debut album was released on October 11, 2011. He co-wrote every song, played every instrument, and along with Dann Huff, produced the album. "Wanted", the second single, was released to radio on March 5, 2012.

On July 24, 2012, he appeared on the CBS's The Talk, where he was then given an RIAA Gold Certification plaque for "Wanted". Just shy of two months since "Wanted" went gold, the song was certified Platinum by RIAA on August 23, 2012.

"Wanted" became his first No. 1 single, making him the youngest solo male act to top Hot Country Songs, breaking the record set in 1973 by Johnny Rodriguez. Twenty weeks after first appearing in the top spot and under a new chart format, "Wanted" returned to the top spot. "Somebody's Heartbreak", the album's third single, went to No. 1 on the Country Airplay chart.

Starting September 14, 2012, Hayes began appearing as the opening act on 90+ dates for Carrie Underwood's Blown Away Tour.

He was also nominated for three Grammys including Best New Artist at the 2013 Grammy Awards; he is the youngest male country artist to be nominated in all three categories for which he was nominated. The album's fourth single, "I Want Crazy", which is from the deluxe Encore edition, was released to country radio on April 7, 2013. It peaked at number two on the Country Airplay chart in August 2013. Following it was "Everybody's Got Somebody but Me", a re-recording of a song from the original press of the album. The re-recorded version features guest vocals from Jason Mraz.

Hunter was one of five country singers who won a CMT Artist of the Year award in 2013. This award is awarded every year to a group of country musicians who have had an outstanding year.

Hayes performed "Invisible", the lead single from his second album, at the 56th Annual Grammy Awards. Storyline was released on May 6, 2014. In an effort to promote his album and to raise awareness to end child hunger, Hunter broke the Guinness World Record for the most concerts played in multiple cities in 24 hours, previously held by The Flaming Lips. The album's second single, "Tattoo" released to country radio on June 16, 2014.

On July 20, 2014, Hayes's self-titled debut album was certified double platinum by the RIAA. Following that was "Light Me Up", another single from the deluxe version of his debut album, in 2015.

=== 2015–2018: The 21 Project and canceled album ===
On May 21, 2015, Hayes released "21", which was the title track for both his EP and third studio album, The 21 Project. He also appeared on the track "I Can Play Guitar" on Brett Kissel's album Pick Me Up.

On November 2, 2016, Hayes performed with four holograms of himself on Jimmy Kimmel Live's after the CMA show.

In March 2017, Hayes performed as part of the C2C: Country to Country festival in the UK where he played alongside Dan + Shay and Darius Rucker supporting Reba McEntire and would return in 2019 with Carly Pearce and Dustin Lynch in support of Lady A. Following "21," Hayes released several songs including “Yesterday’s Song” which were slated to be part of a studio album set to be released in February 2018. Hayes then canceled the project citing “shifted priorities.”

Hayes also appeared as a guest star in the Nickelodeon show Bella and the Bulldogs.

=== 2018–present: Wild Blue and Red Sky ===
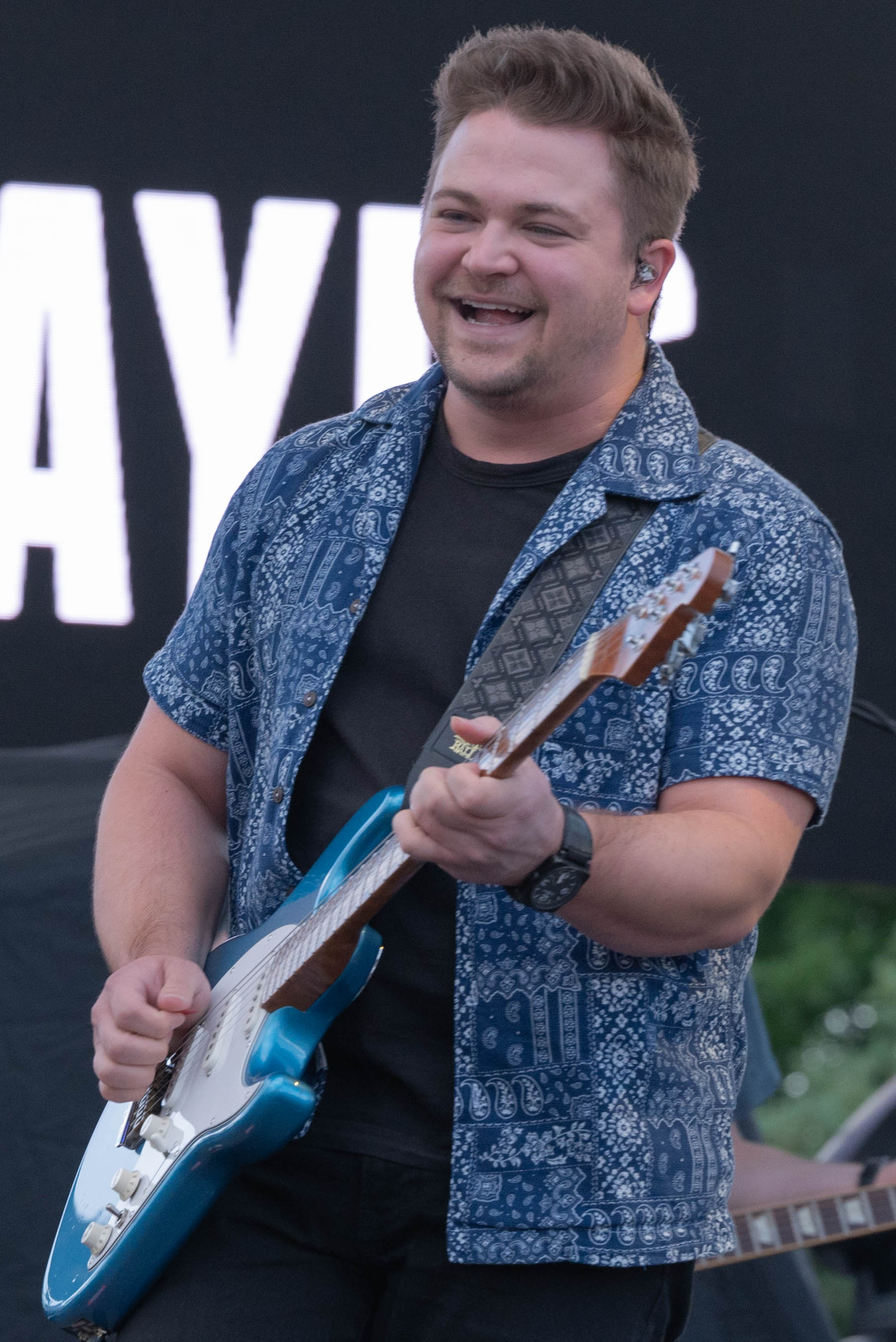
Hunter Hayes performing in Colorado Springs in 2024

In December 2018, Hayes guest starred on Darci Lynne: My Hometown Christmas. He also recorded a duet with Irish singer Catherine McGrath for her debut album Talk of This Town.

In January 2019, Hayes released his first radio single in three years titled "Heartbreak" which was the lead single for an upcoming album to be released by Warner Music Nashville. Hayes headlined the Closer to You Tour in 2019 with Levi Hummon and Tegan Marie as supporting acts.

In August 2019, Hayes made a surprise announcement on NBC's Today Show revealing his album Wild Blue (Part I) would be released on August 16, 2019. The album is the first part of a three-part ‘trilogy’ of albums.

In April 2020, Hayes competed in the third season of The Masked Singer as "Astronaut". In June 2020, the Saskatchewan-based Hunter Brothers released their single "Hard Dirt", co-written and produced by Hayes. He also co-wrote and produced their 2021 single "Been a Minute".

In October 2021, Hayes released the album Wild Blue Complete an extension of the album Wild Blue (Part I).

In April 2023, Hayes released the album Red Sky.

On March 6, 2026, Hayes released the album Evergreen.

== Discography ==
- Hunter Hayes (2011)
- Storyline (2014)
- The 21 Project (2015)
- Wild Blue (2019)
- Red Sky (2023)
- Evergreen (2026)

== Tours ==
Headlining

- Most Wanted Tour (2011)
- Let's Be Crazy Tour, with Ashley Monroe (2013)
- We're Not Invisible Tour, with Danielle Bradbery and Dan + Shay (2014)
- 24 Hour Road Race to End Child Hunger (2014)
- Tattoo (Your Name) Tour, with Dan + Shay and The Railers (2014)
- Let's Be Crazy / Crazier UK Tour (2015)
- 21 Tour, with Ryan Lafferty and Kelsea Ballerini (2015)
- Closer to You Tour, with Levi Hummon and Tegan Marie (2019)
- Red Sky Tour (2023)
- Flying Solo Tour (2023)
- Flying Solo Tour: Season 2 (2024)
- The Evergreen Tour (2026)

Supporting

- Speak Now World Tour – Taylor Swift (2011)
- Blown Away Tour – Carrie Underwood (2012)
- Wheels Up Tour – Lady Antebellum with Sam Hunt and Kelsea Ballerini (2015)
- C2C: Country to Country – Reba McEntire with Dan + Shay and Darius Rucker (2017), Lady Antebellum with Dustin Lynch and Carly Pearce (2019)

== Filmography ==
Year	Title	Role	Notes
1997	The Apostle	Child Accordionist	
1998	Figure It Out	Himself/Guest	
2000	My Dog Skip	Accordion Boy	
2003	Charley's War	Montgomery	
2016	Bella and the Bulldogs	Himself	
2020	The Masked Singer	Astronaut	

== Awards and nominations ==
=== Academy of Country Music Awards ===
The Academy of Country Music Awards, also known as the ACM Awards, were first held in 1966, honoring the industry's accomplishments during the previous year. It was the first country music awards program held by a major organization. The academy's signature "hat" trophy was created in 1968. The awards were first televised in 1972 on ABC.

Year	Category	Nominated work	Result
2013	New Male Vocalist of the Year	Hunter Hayes	Nominated
2013	Single Record of the Year	"Wanted"	Nominated
2013	Song of the Year	"Wanted"	Nominated
2013	Video of the Year	"Wanted"	Nominated

=== American Country Awards ===
The American Country Awards is a country music awards show, entirely voted on by fans. Created by the Fox Network, the awards honor country music artists in music, video, and touring categories. Hayes has won two awards from five nominations.

Year	Category	Nominee / work	Result
2012	New Artist of the Year	Hunter Hayes	Nominated
2012	Single by a New Artist	"Wanted"	Won
2012	Music Video by a New Artist	"Wanted"	Won
2013	Breakthrough Artist of the Year	Hunter Hayes	Nominated
2013	Single by a Breakthrough	"Somebody's Heartbreak"	Nominated

=== Grammy Awards ===
A Grammy Award (originally called Gramophone Award), or Grammy, is an accolade by the National Academy of Recording Arts and Sciences (NARAS) of the United States to recognize outstanding achievement in the music industry. The annual presentation ceremony features performances by prominent artists, and the presentation of those awards that have a more popular interest.

Year	Category	Nominee / work	Result
2013	Best New Artist	Hunter Hayes	Nominated
2013	Best Country Album	Hunter Hayes	Nominated
2013	Best Country Solo Performance	"Wanted"	Nominated
2014	Best Country Solo Performance	"I Want Crazy"	Nominated
2015	Best Country Solo Performance	"Invisible"	Nominated

=== Other awards ===
Year	Association	Category	Work / Nominee(s)	Result
2012	CMT Music Awards	USA Breakthrough Video of the Year	"Storm Warning"	Nominated
2012	Teen Choice Awards	Choice Male Country Artist	Hunter Hayes	Won
2012	Teen Choice Awards	Choice Country Song	"Storm Warning"	Nominated
2012	BMI Awards	Award Winning Song (Top 50)	"Storm Warning"	Won
2012	Country Music Association Awards	New Artist of the Year	Hunter Hayes	Won
2012	Billboard Touring Awards	Top Package	Speak Now, featuring Taylor Swift with Needtobreathe, Hunter Hayes, Danny Gokey, etc.	Nominated
2013	Billboard Music Awards	Top Country Artist	Hunter Hayes	Nominated
2013	Billboard Music Awards	Top Country Song	"Wanted"	Nominated
2013	CMT Music Awards	Video of the Year	"Wanted"	Nominated
2013	CMT Music Awards	Male Video of the Year	"Wanted"	Nominated
2013	CMT Music Awards	Nationwide Insurance On Your Side Award	Hunter Hayes	Won
2013	Teen Choice Awards	Choice Male Country Artist	Hunter Hayes	Won
2013	Teen Choice Awards	Choice Country Song	"I Want Crazy"	Nominated
2013	BMI Awards	Song of the Year	"Wanted"	Won
2013	BMI Awards	Award Winning Song (Top 50)	"Storm Warning"	Won
2013	American Music Awards	Favorite Country Male Artist	Hunter Hayes	Nominated
2014	World Music Awards	World's Best Song	"I Want Crazy"	Nominated
2014	World Music Awards	World's Best Video	"I Want Crazy"	Nominated
2014	World Music Awards	World's Best Album	Hunter Hayes	Nominated
2014	World Music Awards	World's Best Male Artist	Hunter Hayes	Nominated
2014	World Music Awards	World's Best Live Act	Hunter Hayes	Nominated
2014	World Music Awards	World's Best Entertainer	Hunter Hayes	Nominated
2014	CMT Music Awards	Video of the Year	"I Want Crazy"	Nominated
2014	CMT Music Awards	Male Video of the Year	"I Want Crazy"	Nominated
2014	CMT Music Awards	Collaborative Video of the Year	"Everybody's Got Somebody but Me" (featuring Jason Mraz)	Nominated
2014	Teen Choice Awards	Choice Male Country Artist	Hunter Hayes	Won
2014	BMI Awards	Top 50 Songs	"I Want Crazy"	Won
2014	Music Choice Awards	Social Media Superstar	Hunter Hayes	Won
2015	People's Choice Awards	Favorite Male Country Artist	Hunter Hayes	Won
2015	Teen Choice Awards	Choice Country Artist	Hunter Hayes	Nominated
2015	Teen Choice Awards	Choice Country Song	"21"	Nominated
