= Wild Blue (Part I) =

Studio album by Hunter Hayes
- Released: August 16, 2019; October 22, 2021 (Complete)
- Genre: Country pop; pop rock; R&B
- Length: 34:04
- Label: Warner Nashville; LP Entertainment; DashGo
- Producer: Hunter Hayes, Sam Ellis

Hunter Hayes chronology
The 21 Project (2015)	Wild Blue (Part I) (2019)	Red Sky (2023)

Singles from Wild Blue
- 1. "Heartbreak" Released: March 25, 2019

"Wild Blue Complete"
- Complete edition cover

Wild Blue (Part I) is the fourth major label studio album released by American singer-songwriter Hunter Hayes, released on August 16, 2019, through Warner Music Nashville. Hayes co-produced and co-wrote every track on the album.

== Background ==
Hayes initially planned to release the album on October 11, 2019, the eighth anniversary of his first studio album, but in August 2019, Hayes made a surprise announcement on NBC's Today show revealing that the album would be released on August 16, 2019. The album is the first part of a trilogy of albums. The album was only released digitally and to streaming platforms. In October 2021, Hayes released Wild Blue Complete, an extended, altered version of the album with six new songs.

== Commercial performance ==
The album debuted at number 44 on Billboard's Top Country Albums. It has sold 1,400 copies in the United States as of September 2019.

== Track listing ==
Track listing adapted from Rolling Stone.

Wild Blue (Part I)
No.	Title	Writer(s)	Length
1.	"Madness"	Hunter Hayes; Sam Ellis; Sara Haze	3:32
2.	"Wild Blue"	Hayes; Gordie Sampson; Troy Verges	3:50
3.	"Heartbreak"	Hayes; Sampson; Simon Wilcox; Thomas Salter	2:53
4.	"One Good Reason"	Hayes; Ellis	3:28
5.	"Dear God"	Hayes; Andy Grammer; Dave Spencer	2:55
6.	"Loving You"	Hayes; Dave Barnes; Jordan Reynolds	3:58
7.	"My Song Too"	Hayes; Barnes; Reynolds	3:27
8.	"One Shot"	Hayes	2:31
9.	"Night and Day"	Hayes; Ellis; Derrick Southerland	3:45
10.	"Still"	Hayes; Verges; Tommee Profitt	3:46
Total length:			34:04

Wild Blue (Complete)
No.	Title	Writer(s)	Length
1.	"Madness"	Hunter Hayes; Sam Ellis; Sara Haze	3:32
2.	"Wild Blue"	Hayes; Gordie Sampson; Troy Verges	3:50
3.	"Tell Me"	Hayes; Barry Dean; busbee	2:53
4.	"One Good Reason"	Hayes; Ellis	3:28
5.	"Night and Day"	Hayes; Ellis; Derrick Southerland	3:45
6.	"No"	Hayes; Sampson; Josh Hoge	3:23
7.	"If I Didn't Care"	Hayes; Ellis; Josh Miller	3:19
8.	"Dressed in Blue"	Hayes; Bonnie Baker; John Fields	3:08
9.	"Dear God"	Hayes; Andy Grammer; Dave Spencer	2:55
10.	"My Song Too"	Hayes; Dave Barnes; Jordan Reynolds	3:26
11.	"Loving You"	Hayes; Barnes; Reynolds	3:58
12.	"One Shot"	Hayes	2:31
13.	"What If I Do"	Hayes	3:26
14.	"Heartbreak"	Hayes; Sampson; Simon Wilcox; Thomas Salter	2:53
15.	"Preacher"	Hayes; Baker; Ellis	3:40
16.	"Still"	Hayes; Verges; Tommee Profitt	3:46
Total length:			54:57

== Personnel ==
- David Angell – violin
- Monisa Angell – viola
- Chris Ashburn – engineer
- Neal Avron – mixing
- Dave Barnes – acoustic guitar, background vocals
- Drew Bollman – mixing
- Martín Ceballos – engineer
- Seanad Chang – viola
- Dave Cook – mixing
- Janet Darnell – violin
- Sean Daugherty – engineer
- David Davidson – violin
- Desmond Davis – drums, programming, background vocals
- Sam Ellis – acoustic guitar, electric guitar, keyboard, mixing, piano, producer, programmer, background vocals
- Conni Ellisor – violin
- Hunter Hayes – banjo, bass, dobro, drums, engineer, guitar, acoustic guitar, electric guitar, keyboards, mandolin, organ, piano, producer, programmer, programming, strings, vocals, background vocals
- Jack Jezioro – bass
- Jeff Juliano – mixing
- Jared Kneale – drums, background vocals
- Elizabeth Lamb – viola, violin
- Erik Madrid – mixing
- Aaron Mattes – mixing
- Chris McHugh – drums
- Andrew Mendelson – mastering
- Colton Parker – bass, background vocals
- Taylor Pollert – engineer
- Carole Rabinowitz – cello
- Sari Reist – cello
- Jordan Reynolds – background vocals
- Tawgs Salter – programming
- Gordie Sampson – acoustic guitar, background vocals
- Andy Sheridan – piano, background vocals
- Scott Skrzynski – mixing
- Dave Spencer – engineer, producer, programming, synthesizer, bass synthesizer
- Todd Tidwell – engineer, recording
- Matt Utterback – double bass, background vocals
- Kristin Wilkinson – viola
- Karen Winnkelmann – violin

Adapted from AllMusic.

== Charts ==
=== Album ===
Chart (2019)	Peak position
US Top Country Albums (Billboard)	44

=== Singles ===
Year	Single	Peak chart positions
Year	Single	US Country Airplay
2019	"Heartbreak"	56
