= Red Sky (Hunter Hayes album) =

2023 pop album by Hunter Hayes

Studio album by Hunter Hayes
- Released: April 21, 2023
- Genres: Country pop; Pop
- Length: 48:03
- Label: LP Entertainment
- Producers: Hunter Hayes; Ruslan Odnoralov; Dan Book; Alex Delicata; Aaron Zuckerman; Andrew Wells; Dan Gleyzer; Lindgren

Hunter Hayes chronology
Wild Blue (Part I) (2019)	Red Sky (2023)

Singles from Red Sky
- 1. "The One That Got Away" Released: January 14, 2021; 2. "If You Change Your Mind" Released: March 15, 2021; 3. "Missing You" Released: July 8, 2022; 4. "Could've Been You" Released: August 26, 2022; 5. "Friend" Released: October 21, 2022

Red Sky is the fifth major label studio album by American country singer and songwriter, Hunter Hayes. It was released independently on April 21, 2023, under LP Entertainment. Hayes co-produced the record alongside Ruslan Odnoralov, and Dan Book. It spawned five singles, including: "The One That Got Away", "If You Change Your Mind", "Missing You". "Could've Been You". and "Friend". A deluxe version, subtitled Continued featuring five new songs was released on October 13, 2023.

== Background ==
On February 9, Hayes announced the release date and the details for Red Sky, commenting:

@hunterhayes: "I’ve waited over a decade to say this… My first fully independent album, more than 3 years in the making – RED SKY – will be out everywhere APRIL 21st! This project is about the adventure of finding yourself to be yourself. Musically, it’s a road trip from where I’ve been to where I am. Lyrically, it’s for anyone who needs a reminder of how unique your fire inside is and how much the world needs more YOU in it."

— Hunter Hayes about Red Sky, via Instagram

== Promotion and release ==
The album lead single “The One That Got Away” was released on January 14, 2021. It was followed by a second single titled, “If You Change Your Mind” on March 15, 2021.

After the release of his reissue album Wild Blue (Complete), Hayes continued releasing new tracks for the album, with the album third single “Missing You” on July 8, 2022. “Could’ve Been You” was released as the fourth single on August 26, 2022. The album fifth and final single “Friend”, was released on October 21, 2022.

As promotional singles, six tracks from Red Sky were released before the album dropped, including the double release of “Sober” and “Someone Will” on January 18, 2023. Shortly after, Hayes released “Normal” and “Lonely Loves Me” as promotional singles on February 9, 2023. He went to release another double songs on March 8, 2023, with the tracks "Victory" and "About a Boy".

A reissue of the album titled, Red Sky Continued was released on October 13, 2023. It was promoted with the release of two singles: a remix version of "Feelings" featuring Loren Gray, titled "Feelings (Can I Be Honest?)" on May 25, 2023, although the remix was not included on the reissue or on any other edition. It was followed with the release of the project last single "Roses" as the reissue second and the album last single on September 8, 2023.

== The Red Sky Tour ==
On February 21, 2023, Hayes announced The Red Sky Tour, a 22-show venture across the United States to promote the record. It commenced on May 3, in San Diego, CA.

Singer-songwriters Loren Gray, Abby Anderson, Sam DeRosa, and Frawley served as the tour opening acts.

== Critical reception ==
Noah Wade of Melodic magazine stated that "Hayes' foray into pop, despite songs like "Tattoo" and "Everybody's Got Somebody but Me" deep in his discography, isn't a complete left turn" and that "His time as The Astronaut on "The Masked Singer," which saw him cover a litany of pop tunes including "Shape of You" by Ed Sheeran and "If I Can't Have You" by Shawn Mendes, was a reminder to many of just how versatile of a vocalist he can be."

Nicholas Roberts of Square One Magazine voiced that "A consistent issue in Red Sky, greater than any to do with the songs themselves, is a matter of pacing" going on to indicate that "Every time one track builds pace and excitement, or lulls the listener into introspection, the tone suddenly changes and forces you to adjust to the new mood, it's not until the last half of the album that the pace is allowed to build more consistently to suit the overall theme of the album."

== Track listing ==
Red Sky track listing
No.	Title	Producer(s)	Length
1.	"High Tide"	Hunter Hayes; Ruslan Odnoralov; Dan Book	3:04
2.	"About a Boy"	Hayes; Odnoralov	4:14
3.	"Normal"	Hayes; Odnoralov	3:52
4.	"Missing You"	Hayes; Book	2:43
5.	"Lonely Loves Me"	Hayes	2:13
6.	"If You Change Your Mind"	Hayes; Odnoralov	3:31
7.	"Sober"	Hayes; Odnoralov; Alex Delicata; Aaron Zuckerman; Lindgren	3:45
8.	"Friend"	Hayes; Dan Gleyzer; Lindgren	3:36
9.	"Feelings"	Hayes; Lindgren	3:05
10.	"Wallflower"	Hayes; Odnoralov	3:25
11.	"Someone Will"	Hayes; Odnoralov	2:52
12.	"The One That Got Away"	Hayes; Andrew Wells	2:54
13.	"Could've Been You"	Hayes; Lindgren	2:58
14.	"Falling and Flying"	Hayes; Gleyzer	3:24
15.	"Victory"	Hayes; Odnoralov	2:57
Total length:			48:29

Red Sky Continued - edition
No.	Title	Producer(s)	Length
1.	"High Tide"	Hunter Hayes; Ruslan Odnoralov; Dan Book	3:04
2.	"About a Boy"	Hayes; Odnoralov	4:14
3.	"Chasing California"	Hayes	3:16
4.	"I Get It Now"	Hayes	3:38
5.	"Normal"	Hayes; Odnoralov	3:52
6.	"Roses"	Hayes	3:29
7.	"Missing You"	Hayes; Book	2:43
8.	"Should Be You"	Hayes	3:21
9.	"Lonely Loves Me"	Hayes	2:13
10.	"Friend"	Hayes; Dan Gleyzer; Lindgren	3:36
11.	"Falling and Flying"	Hayes; Gleyzer	3:24
12.	"If You Change Your Mind"	Hayes; Odnoralov	3:31
13.	"Sober"	Hayes; Odnoralov; Alex Delicata; Aaron Zuckerman; Lindgren	3:45
14.	"Feelings"	Hayes; Lindgren	3:05
15.	"Could've Been You"	Hayes; Lindgren	2:58
16.	"Someone Will"	Hayes; Odnoralov	2:52
17.	"The One That Got Away"	Hayes; Andrew Wells	2:54
18.	"Wallflower"	Hayes; Odnoralov	3:25
19.	"Love and Only Love"	Hayes	3:06
20.	"Victory"	Hayes; Odnoralov	2:57
Total length:			01:05:00
