= Tegan Marie =

American country singer

- Born: October 25, 2003 (age 22); Grand Blanc, Michigan, US
- Genres: Country; Pop
- Years active: 2015–present
- Label: Warner Music Nashville
- Website: www.teganmarieofficial.com

Tegan Marie (born October 25, 2003) is an American country singer and songwriter. She first received attention for her covers of popular songs, including a rendition of Florida Georgia Line's "H.O.L.Y." that received 20 million views on social media. She was later signed to Warner Music Nashville at age 13, becoming the youngest female singer to sign to a major country label since Tanya Tucker in 1972.

== Early life ==
Marie was born in Grand Blanc, Michigan. She began singing as a toddler, and, when she was around 7, her parents created an account for her on Sweety High, a media company and social networking site for young girls. Marie uploaded videos of herself on Sweety High singing covers of songs by artists like Taylor Swift and Justin Bieber. She began accumulating followers on that platform along with Facebook and YouTube and was signed to a management contract with Sweety High at age 12. On a trip to Los Angeles to meet with Sweety High executives, Marie also met and sang "Love Me Like You Mean It" with Kelsea Ballerini.

== Career ==
In April 2016, Marie released her first single, "Lucky Me." Proceeds from the sale of the song were used to benefit children affected by the Flint water crisis at Hurley Children's Hospital. She also performed at a Flint benefit show with Granger Smith that month. In May 2016, she opened for Hunter Hayes for 3 dates on his tour. The following month, she released her cover of Florida Georgia Line's "H.O.L.Y." which eventually accumulated 20 million views across Facebook and YouTube.

In August 2016, she performed at Arthur Ashe Kids' Day in New York City and followed that with a performance of "Lucky Me" on Good Morning America. In October 2016, she released a cover of Faith Hill's "This Kiss" for the Forever Country Cover Series. At that time, she was also the youngest member of the Country Music Association at age 13. In November 2016, she performed "My Guy" at a Washington, D.C. celebration of Smokey Robinson receiving the Library of Congress' Gershwin Prize of Popular Song. She also released a holiday single, "Just Another Night," in December of that year. Around that time, Marie partnered with Radio Disney Country.

In April 2017, she made her first appearance at the Stagecoach Festival in Indio, California. In August 2017, she performed six shows on the "Walmart Back To School Jam" tour. Later that month, she made her debut on the Grand Ole Opry and signed a record deal with Warner Music Nashville on the same day. At age 13, she was the youngest female singer to be signed to a major country label since 1972 when Tanya Tucker signed to CBS Records. In January 2018, she released her first single on Warner called "Keep It Lit" and performed at the Ryman Auditorium for the first time. She also began working with producers, Nathan Chapman and Scott Hendricks. At the end of that month, she performed "Keep It Lit" on Today.

In June 2018, she released her second single on Warner, "I Know How to Make a Boy Cry". The music video for the song paid homage to Elvis Presley's 1968 Comeback Special. Marie went on a summer tour in support of the single. In November 2018, she appeared in the Macy's Thanksgiving Day Parade on the Girl Scouts of the USA float where she performed "Keep It Lit". The following month, she played Wendy in a production of Peter Pan & Tinker Bell — A Pirate's Christmas at the Tennessee Performing Arts Center in Nashville. Billboard, HuffPost, and Rolling Stone called her a rising country artist and a country artist to watch in 2018.

In March 2019, she was one of the four country music artists of the YouTube docu-series Opry NextStage On March 19, she released the song "Horses." Its music video was produced in conjunction with DreamWorks' Netflix animated series Spirit Riding Free. In April 2019, she released the single, "I Don't Know What Is". Later that year, she joined several other artists in September to raise money for the Alzheimer's Association at the 3rd annual Dance Party to End ALZ.

== Discography ==
=== Singles ===
List of singles as a lead artist, showing year released and album name
Title	Year	Album
"Lucky Me"	2016	–
"Keep It Lit"	2018	–
"I Know How to Make a Boy Cry"	2018	–
"Horses"	2019	–
"I Don't Know What Is"	2019	–
