= Teen Choice Award for Choice Music – Country Artist =

Entertainment award category

The following is a list of Teen Choice Award winners and nominees for Choice Music – Country Artist. Formally awarded as three separate categories from 2010 to 2014: Choice Music – Country Group, Choice Music – Male Country Artist and Choice Music – Female Country Artist. Beginning in 2015, the country genre was condensed from three categories to one, renamed Choice Country Artist. Taylor Swift and Lady Antebellum are the most awarded artists in this category with five wins each.

== Winners and nominees ==
=== 2010s ===
Year	Winner	Nominees	Ref.
2010	Choice Music – Country Group		
2010	Lady Antebellum	Gloriana; Rascal Flatts; Sugarland; Zac Brown Band	
2010	Choice Music – Male Country Artist		
2010	Keith Urban	Luke Bryan; Kenny Chesney; Brad Paisley; Darius Rucker	
2010	Choice Music – Female Country Artist		
2010	Taylor Swift	Miranda Lambert; Martina McBride; Carrie Underwood; Gretchen Wilson	
2011	Choice Music – Country Group		
2011	Lady Antebellum	The Band Perry; Little Big Town; Rascal Flatts; Steel Magnolia	
2011	Choice Music – Male Country Artist		
2011	Keith Urban	Jason Aldean; Luke Bryan; Brad Paisley; Blake Shelton	
2011	Choice Music – Female Country Artist		
2011	Taylor Swift	Miranda Lambert; Jennette McCurdy; Kellie Pickler; Carrie Underwood	
2012	Choice Music – Country Group		
2012	Lady Antebellum	The Band Perry; Eli Young Band; Rascal Flatts; Thompson Square	
2012	Choice Music – Male Country Artist		
2012	Hunter Hayes	Jason Aldean; Luke Bryan; Scotty McCreery; Blake Shelton	
2012	Choice Music – Female Country Artist		
2012	Taylor Swift	Lauren Alaina; Miranda Lambert; Kellie Pickler; Carrie Underwood	
2013	Choice Music – Country Group		
2013	Lady Antebellum	The Band Perry; Florida Georgia Line; Little Big Town; Thompson Square	
2013	Choice Music – Male Country Artist		
2013	Hunter Hayes	Jason Aldean; Luke Bryan; Eric Church; Blake Shelton	
2013	Choice Music – Female Country Artist		
2013	Taylor Swift	Jana Kramer; Miranda Lambert; Kacey Musgraves; Carrie Underwood	
2014	Choice Music – Country Group		
2014	Lady Antebellum	The Band Perry; Florida Georgia Line; Parmalee; Zac Brown Band	
2014	Choice Music – Male Country Artist		
2014	Hunter Hayes	Luke Bryan; Jake Owen; Blake Shelton; Keith Urban	
2014	Choice Music – Female Country Artist		
2014	Taylor Swift	Jana Kramer; Miranda Lambert; Kacey Musgraves; Carrie Underwood	
2015	Carrie Underwood	Luke Bryan; Florida Georgia Line; Hunter Hayes; Miranda Lambert; Blake Shelton	
2016	Carrie Underwood	Kelsea Ballerini; Luke Bryan; Hunter Hayes; Sam Hunt; Blake Shelton	
2017	Carrie Underwood	Florida Georgia Line; Kelsea Ballerini; Blake Shelton; Luke Bryan; Sam Hunt	
2018	Carrie Underwood	Kelsea Ballerini; Kane Brown; Maren Morris; Thomas Rhett; Blake Shelton	
2019	Dan + Shay	Kelsea Ballerini; Kane Brown; Kacey Musgraves; Thomas Rhett; Brett Young	

=== Records ===
Lady Antebellum has won the most times for Choice Music - Country Group, with five wins. Hunter Hayes has won the most times for Choice Music - Male Country Artist, taking home three wins. Taylor Swift has won the most times for Choice Music - Female Country Artist, with five consecutive wins. Carrie Underwood has won the most times for Choice Country Artist, with four consecutive wins.
