= Yesterday's Song =

Single by Hunter Hayes
- Released: October 24, 2016
- Genre: Country pop; pop rock
- Length: 3:43
- Label: Atlantic
- Songwriters: Hunter Hayes; Barry Dean; Martin Johnson
- Producers: Dann Huff; Hunter Hayes

Hunter Hayes singles chronology
"21" (2015)	"Yesterday's Song" (2016)	"Heartbreak" (2019)

Music video
- "Yesterday's Song" on YouTube

"Yesterday's Song" is a song recorded by American singer Hunter Hayes originally intended to be the lead single for a later cancelled studio album. Hayes co-wrote the track with Barry Dean and Martin Johnson and also assisted Dann Huff with production. It was released to digital retailers on September 23, 2016 and officially impacted American country radio on October 24, 2016.

== Content ==
"Yesterday's Song" is a song written by Hunter Hayes, Barry Dean, and Martin Johnson about the "emotional shift" that occurs when someone important to you ceases to be a part of your life. The song's hook compares this person to a song that Hayes used to play "on repeat" but who is now "just an echo where the feeling is gone." According to Hayes, the song represents a "joyous realization that you're moving on and starting this fresh, new chapter." Musically, it is a country song with rock influences and features prominent guitar work, performed by Hayes. The track employs a wall of sound approach to its production. Hayes co-produced the song with long-term collaborator Dann Huff.

== Background and release ==
Hayes released three then-new songs ("Yesterday's Song", "Amen", and "Young Blood") to his SoundCloud page on his 25th birthday: September 9, 2016. The songs were available to stream for a limited time before they were pulled. On the writing process behind the songs, Hayes said that "this is the first time I've really been able to kind of step back from [the pressure of releasing new music] and just let my instincts and creativity flow."

All three songs were then released to digital retailers and Spotify on September 23, 2016 through Atlantic Records (in the United States) and Warner Music Group (internationally). "Yesterday's Song" was selected as an official single and was sent to American country radio stations on October 3, 2016 through Warner Bros. Records and Warner Music Nashville. It officially impacted the format on October 24, 2016.

== Critical reception ==
Billy Dukes of Taste of Country praised the song's fun nature and catchy hook, writing, "there’s some new spontaneity that results in a less perfect, but more enjoyable first single."

== Commercial performance ==
"Yesterday's Song" sold 6,000 copies in its first week, debuting at number 29 on the Country Digital Song Sales chart. This resulted in the song entering the Billboard Hot Country Songs chart dated October 15, 2016 at number 43. "Yesterday's Song" debuted at number 57 on the Country Airplay chart dated November 12, 2016.

In Canada, "Yesterday's Song" did not enter the Canadian Hot 100, but did chart at number 37 on the Canadian Digital Song Sales component chart dated October 15, 2016.

== Music video ==
The song's music video was directed by Ryan Hamblin and finds Hayes reflecting on his musical journey. It premiered March 27, 2017 through Travel + Leisure. The video begins with Hayes finding a shattered disco ball in an abandoned building, which leads him to a giant replica where photos and video clips from earlier stages of his career play on the mirrors. Inside, he is surrounded by faceless women and a "suit-wearing captor" with disco balls in place of their heads. At the end of the video, Hayes runs across a field and jumps into a floating mirror. According to Hayes, the imagery and references to previous videos represent "not letting your past determine who you always will be."

== Live performances and promotion ==
Hayes debuted the song at a benefit concert hosted in Nashville, Tennessee for the 2016 Louisiana floods, which took place September 13, 2016.

== Charts ==
Chart (2016–17)	Peak position
Canada Digital Songs (Billboard)	37
US Country Airplay (Billboard)	44
US Hot Country Songs (Billboard)	43

== Release history ==
Country	Date	Format	Label	Ref.
Worldwide	September 9, 2016	Streaming (limited time via SoundCloud)	Self-released	
Worldwide	September 23, 2016	Digital download	Atlantic; Warner	
United States	October 24, 2016	Country radio	Warner Bros.; Warner Music Nashville	
