= Talk of This Town =

Studio album by Catherine McGrath
- Released: 27 July 2018
- Recorded: 2017–2018
- Genre: Country pop
- Length: 43:05
- Label: Warner Bros.
- Producer: Sam Ellis; Jimmy Robbins; Steve Robson; Forest Whitehead; Jon Maguire

Catherine McGrath chronology
Starting From Now (EP) (2017)	Talk of This Town (2018)

Singles from Talk of This Town
- 1. "Talk of This Town" Released: 19 September 2017; 2. "Thought It Was Gonna Be Me" Released: 24 November 2017; 3. "Wild" Released: 13 April 2018

Talk of This Town is the debut studio album by Northern Irish country music singer and songwriter Catherine McGrath. It was released on 27 July 2018 through Warner Bros. Records. The album was recorded in Nashville and London with a number of producers and co-writers including Steve Robson, Jimmy Robbins (Keith Urban), Liz Rose (Taylor Swift), Forest Glen Whitehead (Kelsea Ballerini) and Sam Ellis (Hunter Hayes).

== Chart performance ==
In the United Kingdom, Talk of This Town debuted at number 13 on the UK Albums Chart, selling 3,839 units in its first week.

== Promotion ==
On 30 April 2018 McGrath announced, through her official Instagram account, her first headlining the Talk of Your Town Tour which took place throughout the UK. The tour began on 14 September in Portsmouth and concluded on 26 September in Glasgow.

== Track listing ==
No.	Title	Writer(s)	Producer(s)	Length
1.	"Talk of This Town"	Catherine McGrath; Rachel Furner; Steve Robson; Jeffrey Steele	Robson	3:26
2.	"The Edges"	McGrath; Nicolle Galyon; Jimmy Robbins	J. Robbins; Jay Reynolds^{[a]}	3:23
3.	"Lost in the Middle"	McGrath; Jeffrey Steele; Lindy Robbins; Robson	Robson	3:09
4.	"Wild"	McGrath; Steele; L. Robbins; Robson	Robson	3:42
5.	"Thought It Was Gonna Be Me"	McGrath; Steele; L. Robbins; Robson	Robson	3:22
6.	"Don't Let Me Forget" (featuring Hunter Hayes)	McGrath; Adam Hambrick; Forest Glen Whitehead	Whitehead	3:25
7.	"Enough for You"	McGrath; Sam Ellis	Ellis	3:19
8.	"Dodged a Bullet"	McGrath; Iain Archer	Archer	3:15
9.	"Good at Love"	McGrath; J. Robbins	J. Robbins	3:05
10.	"Cinderella"	McGrath; Liz Rose; Phil Barton	J. Robbins; Rupert Christie^{[a]}	3:09
11.	"Just in Case"	McGrath; J. Robbins	J. Robbins	3:05
12.	"Good Goodbyes"	McGrath; Wayne Hector; Robson	Robson; Ellis	3:24
13.	"She'll Never Love You"	McGrath; Jon Maguire; Paddy Dalton	Maguire	3:21

Notes

- ^a signifies an additional producer

== Charts ==
Chart (2018)	Peak position
Irish Albums (IRMA)	17
Scottish Albums (OCC)	9
UK Albums (OCC)	13
UK Country Albums (OCC)	1

== Release history ==
Region	Date	Format(s)	Label	Ref.
UK	27 July 2018	CD, digital download	Warner Bros.	
