= The Railers =

American country band

- Also known as: Tin Cup Gypsy
- Origin: Nashville, Tennessee, U.S.
- Genres: Country
- Years active: 2010–present
- Labels: Warner Bros. Nashville
- Members: Jordan Lawson; Jonathan Lawson; Cassandra Lawson
- Past members: Tyler Oban
- Website: www.therailers.com

The Railers is an American country band based out of Nashville, Tennessee, United States. The band is composed of brothers and Missouri natives Jordan and Jonathan Lawson, and Arizona native Cassandra Lawson. Jordan, Jonathan and Cassandra met at Northern Arizona University and moved to Nashville in 2004.

Formerly known as Tin Cup Gypsy, the band changed its name to The Railers in 2012. In 2010, the band opened for Sara Evans and Órla Fallon in addition to headlining their own dates. In 2012, they signed a publishing deal with Sony/ATV Music Publishing and a record deal with Warner Music Nashville.

The Railers released an EP in May 2014 titled The Railers: The Geraldine Session. The EP includes six songs that were all recorded live in one session. They released a single on September 24, 2014, titled "Kinda Dig the Feeling". The song was also featured on the season 3 premiere of ABC's TV series Nashville.

As of 2024, Jonathan and Cassandra Lawson founded the Dark Folk Duo Ivy and the Wall, writing song placements for film and television and working with Danish Publishing House Soul Jam Publishing.

Jordan Lawson is currently a utility touring musician for the Grammy Award-winning artist Carrie Underwood as of May 2024.

== Discography ==
=== Singles ===
Year	Single	Peak positions	Album
Year	Single	US Country Airplay	Album
2014	"Kinda Dig the Feeling"	49	—
2017	"11:59 (Central Standard Time)"	57	—

=== Music videos ===
Year	Video
2017	"11:59 (Central Standard Time)"
