= Light Me Up (Hunter Hayes song) =

Single by Hunter Hayes

from the album I Want Crazy
- Released: March 13, 2015
- Recorded: 2011–13, 2015
- Genre: Country pop; electropop; Rock
- Length: 4:04 (album version); 3:29 (single version)
- Label: Atlantic
- Songwriter(s): Hunter Hayes; busbee; Shane McAnally
- Producer(s): Dann Huff; Hunter Hayes; Duck Blackwell

Hunter Hayes singles chronology
"Tattoo" (2014)	"Light Me Up" (2015)	"21" (2015)

"Light Me Up" is a song written and recorded by American country music artist Hunter Hayes. Co-written by busbee and Shane McAnally, it was originally recorded for Hayes's self-titled debut studio album (2011) but was only included on the 2013 Encore edition re-issue. The song was re-recorded in 2015, and was released to the UK and Oceania on March 13, 2015. as the lead single for Hayes's international compilation album, I Want Crazy (2015).

== Composition ==
"Light Me Up" was written by Hayes with pop songwriter busbee and country music singer Shane McAnally as an upbeat country pop song about the excitement of love. Beginning with a drum loop and B-3, its instrumentation later incorporates guitar, banjo, and bouzouki. Bob Paxman at Nash Country Weekly described the chorus, which features firework and sunshine imagery, as "uplifting."

The UK single version downplays the country elements of the original for a more pop-oriented sound. Drawing influences from electropop and dance-pop, the remix features a more heavily processed vocal and synthesized backbeat.

== Background and release ==
Conceived during the writing sessions for Hayes's self-titled debut studio album, "Light Me Up" was originally recorded sometime in 2011 but was ultimately not included on the original release of the album due to not fitting the tone of the album at the time. In 2012, the song was re-recorded and offered to fans for free through Hayes' official Facebook page as part of a partnership with Country Financial. After the success of "Wanted" and the inspiration he received during his Most Wanted Tour, Hayes began working on new material. It was mutually decided by Hayes and his label in late 2012 that it "[wasn't] necessarily the right time... to make a new record," so the Encore edition of the album was developed as an alternative to make the newly-written songs and a handful of re-recorded tracks (including a new version of "Light Me Up") available to the fans. In 2015, the song was partially re-recorded for a fourth time and given a pop mix for an exclusive UK single release.

== Critical reception ==
"Light Me Up" was mostly well received by critics in review for its parent album. Marc Engel of Fox News praised the mainstream appeal of the song, noting that "with chiming guitars plus a sing-a-long chorus it’s easy to understand why “Light Me Up” has become a fan favorite." Matt Bjorke at Roughstock wrote that the song "feel[s] like [a] potential hit" and "gets the listener in a good mood," while complimenting Hayes's use of the song as a concert opener. Robert Silva at Dotdash Meredith was more critical of the song's repetitive lyrics and the overall sameness of the new tracks on Encore.

== Commercial performance ==
Upon the release of Hunter Hayes (Encore), "Light Me Up" sold over 13,000 units. This prompted a number 50 debut on the Billboard Country Digital Songs (the digital sales component of Hot Country Songs).

== Music video ==
A lyric video for the UK version of the song premiered on 22 January 2015.

The official music video premiered on 9 February 2015 exclusively through Digital Spy. It features Hayes playing the guitar, keyboard, and drums to the song, and "letting his inner rock star out."

== Personnel ==
Credits adapted from the Hunter Hayes (Encore) album liner.

- Hunter Hayes — writing, production, electric guitar, acoustic guitar, B-3, mandolin, bouzouki, banjo, lead and background vocals
- busbee, Shane McAnally — writing
- Nir Z — drums
- Tony Lucido — bass
- Sam Ellis — background vocals
- Dann Huff — production
- Charlie Judge — programming
- David Huff, Christopher Rowe, Sean Neff — digital editing
- Justin Niebank — mixing
- Drew Bollman, Seth Morton — mixing assistance
- Adam Ayan — mastering

== Charts ==
Chart (2013)	Peak position
US Country Digital Songs (Billboard)	50

== Release history ==
Country	Date	Format	Label	Ref.
Australia	13 March 2015	Digital download	Atlantic Records	
Ireland	13 March 2015	Digital download	Atlantic Records	
New Zealand	13 March 2015	Digital download	Atlantic Records	
United Kingdom	13 March 2015	Digital download	Atlantic Records	
United Kingdom	16 March 2015	Mainstream radio	Atlantic Records	
