= Somebody's Heartbreak =

Single by Hunter Hayes

from the album Hunter Hayes
- Released: October 22, 2012
- Recorded: 2011
- Genre: Country pop
- Length: 3:49 (album version)
- Label: Atlantic
- Songwriters: Andrew Dorff; Luke Laird; Hunter Hayes
- Producers: Dann Huff; Hunter Hayes

Hunter Hayes singles chronology
| "Wanted" (2012) | "Somebody's Heartbreak" (2012) | "I Want Crazy" (2013) |

"Somebody's Heartbreak" is a song co-written and recorded by American country music artist Hunter Hayes. It was released in October 2012 as the third single from his debut studio album, Hunter Hayes. Hayes co-wrote the song with Andrew Dorff and Luke Laird. "Somebody's Heartbreak" is about an aspiring lover being invited to break this person's heart.

The song garnered positive reviews from critics who praised the production and lyrics being upbeat and witty. "Somebody's Heartbreak" peaked at number one on the Billboard Country Airplay chart, giving Hayes his second number-one country hit overall. The song also charted at numbers 7 and 54 on both the Hot Country Songs and Hot 100 charts respectively. The song was certified Platinum by the RIAA, and has sold 761,000 copies in the United States as of May 2013. The song received similar chart success in Canada, peaking at number 5 on the Country chart and number 66 on the Canadian Hot 100.

An accompanying music video for the song, directed by Joel Stewart, features footage from his concert in the Rogers Arena and from autograph signings.

== Content ==
The song is in 4/4 time signature and the key of B-flat major, with a main chord pattern of B♭^{maj9}–E♭^{maj9} and an approximate tempo of 76 beats per minute.

== Critical reception ==
Billy Dukes of Taste of Country gave the song four and a half stars out of five, writing that it "combines the pop sensibility of 'Storm Warning' with the passion and power of 'Wanted.'" Matt Bjorke of Roughstock gave the song a favorable review, saying that it "features some groovy guitar, mandolins and a soulful vocal from Hunter that finds him singing a lyrical pick-up line that is cleverly written."

== Music video ==
The music video was directed by Joel Stewart and premiered in December 2012. It featured clips from his concert at Rogers Arena in Vancouver and from autograph signings.

== Chart performance ==
"Somebody's Heartbreak" debuted at number 48 on the Billboard Hot Country Songs chart for the week of November 3, 2012. It also debuted at number 100 on Billboard Hot 100 the week of December 8. Eleven weeks later, it peaked at number 54 for four non-consecutive weeks, staying on the chart for twenty weeks. In Canada, the song debuted at number 94 on the Canadian Hot 100 the week of February 2, 2013. Ten weeks later, it peaked at number 66 and remained there for two consecutive weeks, staying on the chart for fourteen weeks.

| Chart (2012–2013) | Peak position |
|---|---|
| Canada Hot 100 (Billboard) | 66 |
| Canada Country (Billboard) | 5 |
| US Billboard Hot 100 | 54 |
| US Hot Country Songs (Billboard) | 7 |
| US Country Airplay (Billboard) | 1 |

=== Year-end charts ===
| Chart (2013) | Position |
|---|---|
| US Country Airplay (Billboard) | 24 |
| US Hot Country Songs (Billboard) | 28 |

== Radio dates and release history ==
| Region | Date | Format |
|---|---|---|
| United States | October 22, 2012 | Country radio |

== Certifications ==
| Region | Certification | Certified units/sales |
|---|---|---|
| United States (RIAA) | Platinum | 761,000 |
