= Hunter Hayes (album) =

Studio album by Hunter Hayes
- Released: October 11, 2011
- Recorded: Nashville, Tennessee
- Studio: Castle Recording Studios, The Grip, The Good Noise Room, Dark Horse Recording, Blackbird Studios
- Genre: Country
- Length: 44:46
- Label: Atlantic
- Producer: Dann Huff; Hunter Hayes

Hunter Hayes chronology
Songs about Nothing (2008)	Hunter Hayes (2011)	Storyline (2014)

Singles from Hunter Hayes
- 1. "Storm Warning" Released: May 16, 2011; 2. "Wanted" Released: March 5, 2012; 3. "Somebody's Heartbreak" Released: October 22, 2012

Hunter Hayes (Encore)

Singles from Hunter Hayes (Encore)
- 1. "I Want Crazy" Released: April 7, 2013; 2. "Everybody's Got Somebody but Me" Released: September 3, 2013

Hunter Hayes is the debut studio album by American country musician Hunter Hayes. It was released on October 11, 2011, by Atlantic Records. Hayes wrote or co-wrote every track on the album and plays every instrument and sings every vocal track with the exception of the Encore tracks.

At the 55th Grammy Awards, Hunter Hayes was nominated for Best Country Album and "Wanted" was nominated for Best Country Solo Performance while Hayes was nominated for Best New Artist. The album was certified Platinum by the (RIAA) on August 8, 2013.

== Background ==
Hunter Hayes moved to Nashville in 2009, and Rascal Flatts recorded a song he co-wrote, "Play," on their 2010 album Nothing Like This. The producer on the Rascal Flatts album, Dann Huff, then teamed up with Hayes to produce Hayes' first major-label album after he signed a recording contract with Atlantic Records. For the album, he intended to do it his own way, "playing everything on the album, having fun and experimenting." He wrote or co-wrote every songs in the album, and played every instrument, and co-produced the project with Dann Huff.

The first singles released from the album was "Storm Warning" which he co-wrote with Gordie Sampson and busbee. The single was a moderate hit, but his next single Wanted became a considerable success, hitting No. 1 on the Hot Country Songs chart.

A deluxe edition of the album, titled Encore, was released in June 2013 with five new tracks, including the singles "I Want Crazy" and a duet version of "Everybody's Got Somebody but Me" that he re-recorded with Jason Mraz. Hayes said that really wanted "I Want Crazy" to be on a record and that it was a new direction for him musically. "Light Me Up", a track from the Encore edition, was re-recorded for Hayes' 2015 UK-only compilation, I Want Crazy, and was released as that record's second single in March 2015.

== Critical reception ==
Professional ratings
Review scores
Source	Rating
Allmusic	3.5/5 stars
Roughstock	4/5 stars
Taste of Country	3.5/5 stars

The album is generally well received by the critics. Stephen Thomas Erlewine of Allmusic thought that Hayes, "while happy with the middle of the road", "also has crisp, bright, relentless melodies designed to win over any audience. Billy Dukes of Taste of Country was impressed that Hayes wrote, produced and played every instrument on his debut album, but thought that the "lack of participants leaves a tonal homogeneity." He also felt the songs "feel at times plastic," but "what Hayes lacks in "wow" he makes up for with a consistency most artists hope to achieve by album three." Matt Bjorke of Roughstock was enthusiastic and considered it a "fantastic debut album," and that it "really only feels like the beginning of a superstar career for an artist who is able to rise above looking like the next matinee idol on the cover of this record."

== Commercial performance ==
The album peaked at No. 18 on the Billboard 200 and No. 7 on the Country Albums chart, with 18,000 copies sold in the United States during its initial week. With the success of the song "Wanted", sales of the album also increased. In June 2013, on its 71st week, it jumped to No. 7 on the Billboard 200 with the release of the deluxe version of the album, Encore, selling 40,000 copies for the week. The album was certified platinum by the (RIAA) on August 8, 2013, and as of February 2014, the album including the Encore edition has sold 1,105,000 copies in the US.

The album produced 5 singles, 3 of them were consecutive No. 1s on the country charts. A total of over 8 million singles were sold from the album.

== Track listing ==
No.	Title	Writer(s)	Length
1.	"Storm Warning"	Hunter Hayes; Gordie Sampson; busbee	3:59
2.	"Wanted"	Hayes; Troy Verges	3:49
3.	"If You Told Me To"	Hayes; Liz Rose	3:26
4.	"Love Makes Me"	Hayes; Katrina Elam; Bonnie Baker	3:20
5.	"Faith to Fall Back On"	Hayes; Barry Dean	3:08
6.	"Somebody's Heartbreak"	Hayes; Andrew Dorff; Luke Laird	3:49
7.	"Rainy Season"	Hayes; Elam; Baker	5:08
8.	"Cry with You"	Hayes; Dean	3:48
9.	"Everybody's Got Somebody But Me"	Hayes; Dave Brainard; Jennifer Zuffineti	2:40
10.	"What You Gonna Do"	Hayes	4:48
11.	"More Than I Should"	Hayes; Rivers Rutherford; Jeremy Stover	3:15
12.	"All You Ever"	Hayes; Sam Ellis	3:36
Total length:			44:46

Japanese bonus tracks
No.	Title	Writer(s)	Length
13.	"Storm Warning" (Live)	Hayes; Sampson; busbee	5:28
14.	"Wanted" (Live)	Hayes; Verges	4:06
15.	"Somebody's Heartbreak" (Live)	Hayes; Dorff; Laird	5:34
Total length:			59:54

=== Encore edition ===
No.	Title	Writer(s)	Length
1.	"Storm Warning"	Hayes; Sampson; busbee	3:59
2.	"Wanted"	Hayes; Verges	3:49
3.	"If You Told Me To"	Hayes; Rose	3:26
4.	"Love Makes Me"	Hayes; Elam; Baker	3:20
5.	"Faith to Fall Back On"	Hayes; Dean	3:08
6.	"Somebody's Heartbreak"	Hayes; Dorff; Laird	3:49
7.	"Rainy Season"	Hayes; Elam; Baker	5:08
8.	"Cry with You"	Hayes; Dean	3:48
9.	"Everybody's Got Somebody But Me" (featuring Jason Mraz)	Hayes; Brainard; Zuffineti	2:39
10.	"What You Gonna Do" (with Ashley Monroe)	Hayes	5:38
11.	"More Than I Should" (Re-recorded)	Hayes; Rutherford; Stover	3:22
12.	"All You Ever"	Hayes; Ellis	3:36
13.	"In a Song"	Hayes; Ellis	4:18
14.	"I Want Crazy"	Hayes; Lori McKenna; Verges	3:56
15.	"A Thing About You"	Hayes; Elam; Baker	3:18
16.	"Better Than This"	Hayes; Dave Haywood; Charles Kelley	3:32
17.	"Light Me Up"	Hayes; busbee; Shane McAnally	4:04
Total length:			64:55

iTunes bonus videos
No.	Title	Length
18.	"The Making of Encore"	9:32
19.	"Behind the Scenes of "What You Gonna Do" (with Ashley Monroe)	4:30
20.	"I Want Crazy" (Music video)	4:43

== Personnel ==
- Hunter Hayes – accordion, bass guitar, bouzouki, clavinet, drums, acoustic and electric guitars, baritone guitar, electric piano, organ, mandocello, mandolin, piano, resonator guitar, sitar, slide guitar, synthesizer, vocals
- Eric Darken – percussion
- Paul Franklin – steel guitar
- Charlie Judge – programming
- Tony Lucido – bass guitar
- Ashley Monroe – duet vocals on "What You Gonna Do"
- Jason Mraz – duet vocals on "Everybody's Got Somebody but Me"
- Steve Sinatra – drums
- Matt Utterback – bass guitar
- Nir Z. – drums

== Charts and certifications ==
=== Weekly charts ===
Chart (2011–2013)	Peak position
Canadian Albums Chart	12
UK Country Artist Albums Chart	6
US Billboard Top Country Albums	1
US Billboard 200	7

=== Year-end charts ===
Chart (2012)	Position
US Billboard Top Country Albums	22
US Billboard 200	107

Chart (2013)	Position
US Billboard Top Country Albums	6
US Billboard 200	27

Chart (2014)	Position
US Billboard Top Country Albums	48
US Billboard 200	154

=== Decade-end charts ===
Chart (2010–2019)	Position
US Billboard 200	149

=== Certifications ===
Region	Certification	Certified units/sales
Canada (Music Canada)	Gold	40,000^{^}
United States (RIAA)	2× Platinum	1,138,000
^{^} Shipments figures based on certification alone.

=== Singles ===
Year	Single	Peak chart positions							
Year	Single	US Country	US Country Airplay	US	US Pop	US Adult	US AC	CAN Country	CAN
2011	"Storm Warning"	14	—	78	—	—	—	—	—
2012	"Wanted"	1	1	16	23	12	13	—	27
2012	"Somebody's Heartbreak"	7	1	54	—	—	—	5	66
2013	"I Want Crazy"	2	2	19	—	—	—	1	14
2013	"Everybody's Got Somebody but Me" (featuring Jason Mraz)	18	15	77	—	—	—	33	—
"—" denotes releases that did not chart
