= Everybody's Got Somebody but Me =

Single by Hunter Hayes featuring Jason Mraz

from the album Hunter Hayes
- Released: September 3, 2013
- Genre: Country
- Length: 2:40 (Solo version); 2:39 (Encore version)
- Label: Atlantic
- Songwriters: Hunter Hayes; Dave Brainard; Jennifer Zuffinetti
- Producers: Dann Huff; Hunter Hayes

Hunter Hayes singles chronology
"I Want Crazy" (2013)	"Everybody's Got Somebody but Me" (2013)	"Invisible" (2014)

Jason Mraz singles chronology
"The Woman I Love" (2013)	"Everybody's Got Somebody But Me" (2013)	"Rough Water" (2013)

"Everybody's Got Somebody but Me" is a song co-written and recorded by American country music artist Hunter Hayes for his eponymous debut album, Hunter Hayes (2011). While recording new material for (Encore), the expanded re-issue of his debut, Hayes also re-recorded three of the tracks, including a new duet version of "Everybody's Got Somebody But Me" featuring guest vocals by singer Jason Mraz. Atlantic Nashville released the Encore version of the song as the fifth single from the album, and second from the (Encore) edition, on September 3, 2013.

== Content ==
The song is a plucky, mid-tempo country pop song backed by a steel guitar. Its lyrics depict a narrator surrounded by couples who bemoans his inability to find someone to love, lamenting "everybody's got somebody but me". Hayes specifically sought to include Mraz on the re-recording because the songwriters felt it "sounded so much like" Mraz's music.

== Critical reception ==
Billy Dukes of Taste of Country found the "playful spirit" of the song to be a refreshing change of pace from Hayes's previous singles, and thought that it was "the most fun [Hayes has been] since 'Storm Warning'". Roughstock editor Matt Bjorke gave the song a glowing review, summarizing his thoughts thus: "['Everybody's Got Somebody But Me'] showcases everything there's to like about Hunter Hayes as a singer, a songwriter and artist." Entertainment blog Cambio praised the collaboration between Hayes and Mraz, which they called unexpected but "pretty genius", as well as the relatable and "cute" lyrics of the song.

== Music video ==
Hayes and Mraz invited YouTube artists and other aspiring musicians Tessa Violet, Echosmith, TJ Smith, Tyler Ward, Brandyn Burnette, Brian Landau, Sam Tsui, Kina Grannis and Peter Hollens to share their covers of the song, and participate in a one-take mashup video. This was the first such venture by Warner Music Group, whose senior vice-president for interactive marketing said optimistically that "[f]or some kids, people like Kurt Schneider and Tyler Ward are people that they trust." This video was directed by YouTube artist director Kurt Hugo Schneider.

Another music video with just Hayes and Mraz in a park singing the song while various couples cross their paths to the exasperation of both of them was also released. This music video was directed by Shane Drake and premiered in October 2013.

== Chart performance ==
"Everybody's Got Somebody but Me" debuted at number 58 on the U.S. Billboard Country Airplay chart for the week of July 13, 2013. It also debuted at number 48 on the U.S. Billboard Hot Country Songs chart for the week of October 12, 2013. It also debuted at number 25 on the U.S. Billboard Bubbling Under Hot 100 Singles chart for the week of November 2, 2013.

== Charts and certifications ==
=== Weekly charts ===
Chart (2013–2014)	Peak position
Canada Country (Billboard)	33
US Billboard Hot 100	77
US Country Airplay (Billboard)	15
US Hot Country Songs (Billboard)	18

=== Year-end charts ===
Chart (2014)	Position
US Country Airplay (Billboard)	94
US Hot Country Songs (Billboard)	84

=== Certifications ===
Region	Certification	Certified units/sales
United States (RIAA)	Gold	500,000^{‡}
^{‡} Sales+streaming figures based on certification alone.
