= Storm Warning (song) =

Single by Hunter Hayes

from the album Hunter Hayes
- Released: May 16, 2011
- Genre: Country
- Length: 3:59
- Label: Atlantic
- Songwriter(s): Hunter Hayes; Gordie Sampson; busbee
- Producer(s): Dann Huff; Hunter Hayes

Hunter Hayes singles chronology
| "Storm Warning" (2011) | "Wanted" (2012) |

"Storm Warning" is the debut song co-written and recorded by American country music artist Hunter Hayes. It was released in May 2011 as the first single from his debut album Hunter Hayes. Hayes co-wrote the song with Gordie Sampson and busbee. The song garnered positive reviews from critics who praised Hayes' lyricism and vocal performance. "Storm Warning" peaked at numbers 14 and 78 on both the Billboard Hot Country Songs and Hot 100 charts respectively. It was certified Gold by the Recording Industry Association of America (RIAA), denoting sales of 500,000 units in the country. An accompanying music video for the single, directed by Brian Lazzaro, features Hayes performing various instruments while singing the song.

== Content ==
The song is about a woman whom the singer compares to a hurricane, singing that he wishes that he had a "storm warning" for her.

== Critical reception ==
Amanda Hensel of Taste of Country gave the song an eight out of ten rating, describing it as "light and airy, upbeat and catchy, but easy for anyone to relate to" while adding that "it's inevitable that Hayes is about to take country music by storm." Matt Bjorke of Roughstock gave the song three stars out of five, writing that the song has a "clever enough lyric, magnetic melody and charisma to burn, both vocally and melodically." Storm Warning also picked up a Top 50 Song award during the 2012 BMI awards.

== Music video ==
The music video was directed by Brian Lazzaro and premiered in Mid-May 2011. It features Hayes playing various instruments such as the guitar, drums, and banjo as he sings the song.

== Chart performance ==
"Storm Warning" debuted at number 60 on the Billboard Hot Country Songs chart for the week of May 14, 2011. It also debuted at number 98 on the Billboard Hot 100 chart for the week of November 12, 2011 but left the next week. It reappeared in the same position on the week of December 10, and peaked at number 78 the week of January 14, 2012. The song remained on the chart for fourteen weeks.

| Chart (2011–2012) | Peak position |
|---|---|
| Canada Country (Billboard) | 39 |
| US Hot Country Songs (Billboard) | 14 |
| US Billboard Hot 100 | 78 |

=== Year-end charts ===
| Chart (2011) | Position |
|---|---|
| US Country Songs (Billboard) | 80 |

| Chart (2012) | Position |
|---|---|
| US Country Songs (Billboard) | 66 |

== Certifications ==
| Region | Certification | Certified units/sales |
|---|---|---|
| United States (RIAA) | Gold | 500,000^{^} |
^{^} Shipments figures based on certification alone.
