= I Want Crazy =

Single by Hunter Hayes

from the album Hunter Hayes and I Want Crazy
- Released: April 22, 2013
- Genre: Country
- Length: 3:56
- Label: Atlantic
- Songwriters: Hunter Hayes; Lori McKenna; Troy Verges
- Producers: Dann Huff; Hunter Hayes

Hunter Hayes singles chronology
"Somebody's Heartbreak" (2012)	"I Want Crazy" (2013)	"Everybody's Got Somebody but Me" (2013)

Alternate cover
- Ryan Tedder Mix cover

"I Want Crazy" is a song co-written and recorded by American country music artist Hunter Hayes. It is one of five songs recorded for Hunter Hayes (Encore), the deluxe edition of Hayes' self-titled debut album. Hayes debuted the song at the Academy of Country Music Awards on April 7, 2013, and it was released the next day as the lead single for the reissue of Hunter Hayes and fourth from the album overall. Hayes wrote the song with Lori McKenna and Troy Verges. A new mix of the song produced by Ryan Tedder was released in the UK on April 17, 2015 as the third single from his international debut album, I Want Crazy (2015).

Upon release, "I Want Crazy" met with critical and commercial success. It became Hayes' second top 20 hit on the Billboard Hot 100 (after "Wanted") and was certified 2× Platinum by the (RIAA). In Canada, "I Want Crazy" peaked at number 14 and was certified Platinum, in addition to topping the Canadian Country Airplay chart compiled by Billboard. The song was nominated for Best Country Solo Performance at the 56th Grammy Awards, but lost to Darius Rucker's "Wagon Wheel".

== Content ==
The song is a moderate up-tempo accompanied by electric guitar and mandolin. In it, the male singer says that he wants his lover to be "crazy", and will not be satisfied by a slower-paced relationship. It is in the key of E-flat major, with open fifths consisting of the pitches E♭ and B♭ sounding on the verses.

== Critical reception ==
Giving it a "thumbs up", Sam Gazdziak of Engine 145 said "Clearly, he’s singing to a younger audience who want to hear more about the wild and crazy side of love and not the harsh realities… That said, the song is also ridiculously catchy, and Hayes’ talents as a singer and musician help make it rise above any lyrical missteps." It received 4 stars out of 5 from Billy Dukes of Taste of Country, who said that the song had a "frantic pace" that "matches what he’s looking for", and that it "shows a new level of confidence". A 4.5 star rating came from Matt Bjorke of Roughstock, who compared it favorably to Keith Urban and said that the "lyrics… are stronger than most of the songs on country radio and the melody is interesting."

== Music video ==
The music video for "I Want Crazy" was directed by Ends and shot in Saint John, New Brunswick, Canada. It premiered on CMT and GAC on April 29, 2013.

== Commercial performance ==
"I Want Crazy" debuted at number 24 on the U.S. Billboard Country Airplay chart for the week of April 27, 2013. It also debuted at number 36 on the U.S. Billboard Hot Country Songs chart for the week of April 20, 2013. It also debuted at number 43 on the U.S. Billboard Hot 100 chart for the week of April 27, 2013. In March 2015, the song was certified 2× Platinum by the RIAA. The song has sold 1,884,000 copies in the US as of March 2020.

The song also debuted at number 14 on the Canadian Hot 100 chart for the week of April 27, 2013.

== Chuck E. Cheese's version ==
The popular pizza chain Chuck E. Cheese's used the song in a January 2014 show; the song was sung by Jasper T. Jowls.

== Charts and certifications ==
=== Weekly charts ===
Chart (2013)	Peak position
Canada Hot 100 (Billboard)	14
Canada Country (Billboard)	1
US Billboard Hot 100	19
US Hot Country Songs (Billboard)	2
US Country Airplay (Billboard)	2

=== Year-end charts ===
Chart (2013)	Position
Canada (Canadian Hot 100)	87
US Billboard Hot 100	72
US Country Airplay (Billboard)	13
US Hot Country Songs (Billboard)	5

=== Certifications ===
Region	Certification	Certified units/sales
Canada (Music Canada)	Platinum	80,000^{*}
United States (RIAA)	2× Platinum	1,884,000
^{*} Sales figures based on certification alone.
