= Wanted (Hunter Hayes song) =

Single by Hunter Hayes

from the album Hunter Hayes
- Released: March 5, 2012
- Genre: Country; country pop
- Length: 3:48
- Label: Atlantic
- Songwriters: Hunter Hayes; Troy Verges
- Producers: Dann Huff; Hunter Hayes

Hunter Hayes singles chronology
"Storm Warning" (2011)	"Wanted" (2012)	"Somebody's Heartbreak" (2012)

"Wanted" is a song co-written and recorded by American country music singer Hunter Hayes. It was released in March 2012 as the second single from his debut album Hunter Hayes (2011). Hayes co-wrote the song with Troy Verges. The song was nominated for Best Country Solo Performance at the 2013 Grammy Awards. It is the second best-selling song by a male solo country singer in the US as of April 2014. Billboard ranked it the third-greatest country single of all time according to chart performance.

Upon release, "Wanted" was met with generally positive reviews and went on to be certified 4× Platinum in the US for sales of over 3.6 million. When the song topped the Hot Country Songs chart, Hayes broke the record held since 1973 by Johnny Rodriguez's "You Always Come Back (To Hurting Me)" as the youngest male artist to reach number one. The single was a moderate crossover hit in 2013 when it climbed to the top 15 on both the Adult Pop Songs and Adult Contemporary charts.

== Content ==
Hunter told Taste of Country about writing the song: "At the time, I was trying to tell somebody something, but I couldn't figure out how to say it. So I wanted to say it in music because I knew it would be a little more impactful. I wanted to say we are great in this relationship together, and I feel like it could even get better."

The song is a ballad expressing a desire to make a lover feel "wanted" by the narrator. It is in C major and an approximate tempo of 84 beats per minute.

== Critical reception ==
Billy Dukes of Taste of Country gave the song 4.5 out of 5 stars. Dukes wrote, "It’s a mature lyric that will wrap around the hearts of country loving women nationwide." He added, "It's familiar without being generic and catchy without being syrupy." Giving it five out of five stars, Matt Bjorke of Roughstock wrote: "While 'Storm Warning' was a great opening salvo, 'Wanted' is the song that is going to make Hunter Hayes one of the music world’s most talented artists to arrive in years – that’s right – years."

== Music video ==
The music video was unveiled in early March 2012. It was directed by BirdmachineBird (Patrick Hubik and Traci Goudie).

== Chart performance ==
"Wanted" debuted at number 57 on the US Billboard Hot Country Songs chart for the week of February 27, 2012. It also debuted at number 99 on the US Billboard Hot 100 for the week of May 12, 2012. It also debuted at number 100 on the Canadian Hot 100 for the week of September 15, 2012. For the week of September 29, 2012, "Wanted" became Hayes' first number one single. Twenty-one weeks later, it returned to number one on the same chart. It also debuted at number 40 on the US Billboard Adult Pop Songs chart for the week of November 17, 2012, on which chart it eventually peaked at number 12. "Wanted" also reached number 13 on the Adult Contemporary chart. The song peaked at number 16 on the US Billboard Hot 100 and displayed longevity on the chart by staying on the chart for 46 weeks. As of February 2016, the song has sold 3,766,000 copies in the United States, where it is certified 4× Platinum by RIAA. "Wanted" has also been certified 2× Platinum by Music Canada.

=== Legacy ===
The song's appearance at number one made Hayes the youngest solo male artist (by three months and one week) to top the Hot Country Songs chart, surpassing a record set in 1973 by Johnny Rodriguez's "You Always Come Back (To Hurting Me)". The song became the second best-selling song by a male country solo artist in April 2014. In 2016, Billboard ranked "Wanted" at number three on a "Greatest of All Time" Country Songs chart behind Florida Georgia Line's "Cruise" and Leroy Van Dyke's "Walk on By".

== Charts ==
=== Weekly charts ===
Chart (2012–2013)	Peak position
Canada Hot 100 (Billboard)	27
Canada Country (Billboard)	1
US Billboard Hot 100	16
US Pop Airplay (Billboard)	23
US Hot Country Songs (Billboard)	1
US Adult Pop Airplay (Billboard)	12
US Adult Contemporary (Billboard)	13

=== Year-end charts ===
Chart (2012)	Position
US Billboard Hot 100	52
US Hot Country Songs (Billboard)	20
Chart (2013)	Position
US Billboard Hot 100	92
US Adult Contemporary (Billboard)	39
US Adult Pop Songs (Billboard)	46
US Hot Country Songs (Billboard)	17

=== Decade-end charts ===
Chart (2010–2019)	Position
US Hot Country Songs (Billboard)	7

=== All-time charts ===
Chart	Position
US Hot Country Songs (Billboard)	3

== Certifications and sales ==
Region	Certification	Certified units/sales
Canada (Music Canada)	2× Platinum	160,000^{*}
New Zealand (RMNZ)	Gold	15,000^{‡}
United States (RIAA)	5× Platinum	3,766,000
^{*} Sales figures based on certification alone.^{‡} Sales+streaming figures based on certification alone.

== Release history ==
Release dates and formats for "Wanted"
Region	Date	Format	Label(s)	Ref.
United States	October 16, 2012	Mainstream airplay	Atlantic	
