= TA2 =

TA2 may refer to:

== Transportation and vehicular ==
- Torpedoboot Ausland 2, a World War II German torpedo boat, a captured French Le Fier-class sea-going torpedo boat

=== Aviation ===
- Fokker TA-2, a 1920s U.S. military transport monoplane
- Huff-Daland TA-2, a 1920s U.S. trainer biplane
- Towle TA-2, a 1929 floatplane

=== Motorsport ===
- The TA2 class within the Trans-Am Series, a North American sports car racing series.
- TA2 Racing Muscle Car Series, an Australian car racing series

== Science, medicine, engineering, technology ==
- The second edition of Terminologia Anatomica, the international standard for human anatomical terminology.
- In molecular biology, a second transactivation domain
- In materials science or engineering, grade 2 unalloyed titanium

== Other uses ==
- SEC Form TA-2, for stock transfer agents to submit an annual report of their transfer activities
- TA2, a district of the Taunton postcode area in South West England, UK
- A multi-modal database containing audio and video recordings published by the Idiap Research Institute
- Tatsuhisa Suzuki (born 1983), Japanese singer with the stagename "Ta_2"

== See also ==
- Dodge Viper TA 2.0, a sports car
- Tantalum(IV) sulfide (Ta2S), ditantalum sulphide
- Tattoo (disambiguation)
- Tatu (disambiguation)
- Tata (disambiguation)
- TAA (disambiguation)
- T2A (disambiguation)
- TA (disambiguation)
