= List of early cases of COVID-19 in the United States =

This is a list of early transmissions of coronavirus disease 2019 (COVID-19) in the United States, covering cases that occurred in January and February 2020.

By the end of February, 24 cases were known, a number that had increased to 27,368 by the end of March, and continued to grow over the year. The outbreak evolved into a severe pandemic over the course of the year, with extremely rapid growth in cases after that point. In addition to those 24 cases known by the end of February, this list includes three cases which were confirmed later by phylogenetic analysis and post-mortems for a total of 27 cases. This list does not include repatriated cases- such as the fourteen infected citizens brought back from the Diamond Princess in February.

Limited testing at the time means that it is likely there were additional undetected cases. Dr. Sara Cody, medical officer for Santa Clara County (which saw a number of the first cases) stated that those confirmed at the time represented only "the tip of an iceberg".

== List of cases ==
Date	Status	CDC Origin Type	Origin	Location	Treatment Facility	Sex	Age
January 21	Recovered	Travel-related	Wuhan, China	Snohomish County, Washington	Providence Regional Medical Center Everett	Male	35
The first confirmed case in the United States, the 35-year-old man had recently travelled from Wuhan to Seattle–Tacoma International Airport on January 15 and reported on January 19 to the Providence Regional Medical Center in Everett, Washington, with symptoms of pneumonia. He was released from the hospital on February 3 after two weeks of treatment, including the use of the anti-viral drug remdesivir, and remained in isolation at home.
January 24	Recovered	Travel-related	Wuhan, China	Chicago, Illinois	St. Alexius Medical Center	Female	60s
The second confirmed case, a woman in her 60s living in Chicago, Illinois. The woman had recently travelled to Wuhan to take care of a sick parent. The woman exposed her husband, the sixth case, and both were cared for at St. Alexius Medical Center in Hoffman Estates, Illinois. The couple was discharged on February 7 and moved to in-home isolation.
January 25	Recovered	Travel-related	Wuhan, China	Orange County, California	In-Home Isolation	Male	50s
The CDC confirmed a third case in Orange County, California. The person, a man in his 50s, was released from the hospital on February 1 in good condition to in-home isolation.
January 26	Confirmed	Travel-related	Wuhan, China	Los Angeles County, California	Undisclosed	Undisclosed	Undisclosed
January 26	Recovered	Travel-related	Wuhan, China	Tempe, Arizona	In-Home Isolation	Male	Under 60
A "member of the Arizona State University community who does not live in university housing" which provoked a student petition to cancel classes "until proper precautions have been taken to ensure the well-being of the students." On February 21, Maricopa County Department of Health confirmed that the patient was no longer infected and was out of isolation.
January 30	Recovered	Person-to-person spread	Spouse	Chicago, Illinois	St. Alexius Medical Center	Male	60s
The first case of human-to-human transmission in the U.S., the man contracted the virus from his wife, the second case, and had not recently travelled to China. The couple was discharged from the St. Alexius Medical Center in Hoffman Estates, Illinois, on February 7 and moved to in-home isolation.
January 31	Recovered	Travel-related	Wuhan, China	Santa Clara County, California	In-Home Isolation	Male	Undisclosed
A man in Santa Clara County, California. The man recovered at home and was released from in-home isolation on February 20.
January 31	Deceased	Person-to-person spread	Unknown	Santa Clara County, California	Died at home; case confirmed by post-mortem	Female	57
A woman in Santa Clara County, California. She became ill on January 31 and died on February 6- possibly the first death in the United States from the virus, though the case was only confirmed by post-mortem in April.
February 1	Confirmed	Travel-related	Wuhan, China	Boston, Massachusetts	In-Home Isolation	Male	20s
A student at the University of Massachusetts Boston who had recently returned from Wuhan, China. As of February 26, the student was still isolated and recovering at his off-campus home.
February 2	Confirmed	Travel-related	Wuhan, China	Santa Clara County, California	In-Home Isolation	Female	Undisclosed
A woman in Santa Clara County, California, who had recently travelled to Wuhan. This case is unrelated to the seventh case, also in Santa Clara.
February 2	Confirmed	Travel-related	Wuhan, China	San Benito County, California	Hospitalized	Male	57
A man who had recently travelled to Wuhan, China and was involved in the second instance of human-to-human transmission when his wife, the eleventh case, tested positive.
February 2	Confirmed	Person-to-person spread	Spouse	San Benito County, California	Hospitalized	Female	57
The second instance of human-to-human transmission, the woman tested positive after being exposed to her husband who had recently travelled to Wuhan, China.
February 5	Confirmed	Travel-related	Beijing	Madison, Wisconsin	In-Home Isolation	Undisclosed	Adult
The CDC and the Wisconsin Department of Health Services confirmed the twelfth case in Madison, Wisconsin. According to public health officials, the person went directly to the University of Wisconsin Hospital after arriving at the Dane County Regional Airport and is not a student at the University of Wisconsin Madison.
February 11	Confirmed	Person-to-person spread	Unknown	San Francisco, California	Unknown	Unknown	Unknown
Phylogenetic analysis indicated that the index case of the Diamond Princess outbreak was infected with the Washington strain of the virus while the ship was in port at San Francisco on February 11. The person who infected the index case that day is not known.
February 17	Deceased	Person-to-person spread	Unknown	Santa Clara County, California	Died at home; case confirmed by post-mortem	Undisclosed	Undisclosed
A person in Santa Clara County, California, who died at home around February 17. Confirmed by post-mortem in April.
February 20	Confirmed	Travel-related	China	Humboldt County, California	In-Home Isolation	Undisclosed	Adult
February 20	Confirmed	Travel-related	China	Sacramento County, California	In-Home Isolation	Undisclosed	Undisclosed
February 26	Confirmed	Person-to-person spread	Unknown	Solano County, California	UC Davis Medical Center	Female	Adult
The first case discovered in the United States of unknown origin. The California Department of Public Health said this may represent the first community transmission in the country. The UC Davis Medical Center in Sacramento said that when the person was transferred there on February 19, the medical team suspected it was COVID-19 and asked the CDC to test for SARS-CoV-2. The CDC initially refused since the person did not meet the criteria for testing. The person was ultimately tested on February 23; the test results returned positive on February 26.
February 28	Confirmed	Person-to-person spread	Unknown	Santa Clara County, California	El Camino Hospital	Female	65
The second case to be discovered with unknown origin.
February 28	Presumptive	Person-to-person spread	Unknown	Washington County, Oregon	Kaiser Westside Medical Center	Undisclosed	65
A school employee at Forest Hills Elementary School in Lake Oswego and the first case in Oregon.
February 28	Confirmed	Person-to-person spread	Unknown	Snohomish County, Washington	In-Home Isolation	Male	Teens
A high school student at Jackson High School and the third case discovered with unknown origin.
February 28	Confirmed	Travel-related	Daegu, South Korea	King County, Washington	In-Home Isolation	Female	50s
The first travel-related case where China was not the country of origin but rather South Korea.
February 29	Deceased	Person-to-person spread	Unknown	King County, Washington	EvergreenHealth	Male	50s
The first death from the virus to be confirmed in the United States. The earlier deaths in this list were only confirmed by later analysis.
February 29	Presumptive	Person-to-person spread	Unknown	King County, Washington	Overlake Hospital Medical Center	Female	40s
A healthcare worker from Life Care Center of Kirkland, a nursing facility in King County, Washington.
February 29	Presumptive	Person-to-person spread	Unknown	King County, Washington	EvergreenHealth	Female	70s
A resident of the Life Care Center of Kirkland, a nursing facility in King County, Washington.
February 29	Confirmed	Undisclosed	Undisclosed	Cook County, Illinois	Hospitalized	Undisclosed	Undisclosed
No further public details.
February 29	Presumptive	Person-to-person spread	Household	Santa Clara County, California	In-Home Isolation	Female	Adult
A "household contact" of a previously announced case in Santa Clara County.
