= 21 (Hunter Hayes song) =

Single by Hunter Hayes

from the album The 21 Project
- Released: May 21, 2015
- Genre: Country pop; pop rock
- Length: 3:13
- Label: Atlantic Nashville
- Songwriters: Dallas Davidson; Kelley Lovelace; Ashley Gorley
- Producers: Dann Huff; Hunter Hayes

Hunter Hayes singles chronology
| "Light Me Up" (2015) | "21" (2015) | "Yesterday's Song" (2016) |

"21" is a song recorded by American country music singer Hunter Hayes as the lead single from his third studio album The 21 Project (2015). Written by Dallas Davidson, Kelley Lovelace, and Ashley Gorley, the song is Hayes' first to not feature an official writing credit. It was released in the UK on May 21, 2015, before being released to digital retailers in North America on May 26, 2015. It is also included on his second extended play, 21 (2015). "21" impacted country radio on June 8, 2015, and entered the Billboard Country Airplay chart at number 32.

== Composition ==
"21" is a mid-tempo country pop and pop rock song about the "carefree" days of being a young adult. The staff at country music blog Taste of Country noted the song's lyrics as being more superficial and straightforward than those on his previous album, Storyline (2014). A chant of "nah nah nah" opens the song, over a guitar riff that Hayes added as part of his effort to personalize the song, and is repeated again at the end of each chorus. It has been described as a "party song" by critics including Brian Mansfield of USA Today.

The song was written by Dallas Davidson, Kelley Lovelace, and Ashley Gorley, although Hayes made changes to the arrangement with Davidson's approval. Billboard credits him as a songwriter for his contributions. Hayes also co-produced the song with Dann Huff.

== Background and release ==
On May 11, 2015, Country Aircheck published a full-page ad online with a black-and-green calendar bearing Hayes' official logo and highlighting the date May 21, leading to speculation that his then-upcoming single would be released on that date. Hayes continued promoting the single by posting twenty-one consecutive tweets containing only solid-black images, alluding to the song's title. He confirmed the title on May 18 and 19, by posting a black square with a green 2 on the left half and a green square with a 1 on the right half, respectively, on those dates. On May 21, 2015, the song was released to streaming services and to iTunes UK, and was made available to country radio. It was released to digital retailers in Canada and the United States on May 26, 2015. The song official impacted country radio on June 8, 2015.

== Music video ==
The music video was directed by Kristin Barlowe and premiered in June 2015.

== Chart performance ==
"21" debuted at number 32 on the Billboard Country Airplay chart for the week ending June 6, 2015. The song has sold 117,000 copies in the US as of December 2015.

| Chart (2015) | Peak position |
|---|---|
| Canada Hot 100 (Billboard) | 65 |
| US Bubbling Under Hot 100 Singles (Billboard) | 14 |
| US Country Airplay (Billboard) | 21 |
| US Hot Country Songs (Billboard) | 26 |

=== Year-end charts ===
| Chart (2015) | Position |
|---|---|
| US Country Airplay (Billboard) | 76 |
| US Hot Country Songs (Billboard) | 66 |

== Release history ==
| Country | Date | Format | Label | Ref. |
|---|---|---|---|---|
| United States | May 21, 2015 | Streamed audio | Atlantic Nashville | |
| United Kingdom | May 21, 2015 | Digital download | Atlantic Nashville | |
| Canada | May 26, 2015 | Digital download | Atlantic Nashville | |
| United States | May 26, 2015 | Digital download | Atlantic Nashville | |
| United States | June 8, 2015 | Country radio | Atlantic Nashville | |
