= Tattoo (disambiguation) =

A tattoo is a marking made by the insertion of indelible ink into the skin.

Tattoo may also refer to:

== Print media ==
- Tattoo (comics), fictional mutant character in the Marvel Comics Universe
- "Tattoo" (poem), a poem from Wallace Stevens' first book of poetry, Harmonium
- "Tattoo" (short story), a 1996 short story by Matthew Condon

== Film and TV ==
=== Film ===
- Tattoo (1967 film), a West German film directed by Johannes Schaaf
- Tattoo (1981 film), an American thriller directed by Bob Brooks, starring Bruce Dern
- Tattoo (2002 film), a German film directed by Robert Schwentke
- Tattoo (2011 film), a short film directed by Bill Paxton
- Tattoo (2013 film), a Brazilian film directed by Hilton Lacerda

=== Television ===
- Tattoo (character), portrayed by Hervé Villechaize on the TV series Fantasy Island
- Tattoo (Prison Break), the elaborate tattoo detailing the escape plan, which belongs to the protagonist of television series, Prison Break
- "Tattoo" (Star Trek: Voyager), the 24th episode of Star Trek: Voyager

== Music ==
=== Albums ===
- Tattoo (David Allan Coe album), 1977
- Tattoo (Rory Gallagher album), 1973
- Tattoos (Jason Derulo album), 2013
- Tattoos (Brantley Gilbert album), 2024

=== Songs ===
- "Tattoo" (Big Mother Thruster song), 2001
- "Tattoo" (Hunter Hayes song), 2014
- "Tattoo" (Jordin Sparks song), 2007
- "Tattoo" (Loreen song), which won the Eurovision Song Contest 2023
- "Tattoo" (Mike Oldfield instrumental), 1992
- "Tattoo" (Siouxsie and the Banshees song), 1983
- "Tattoo" (Tito Double P song), 2025
- "Tattoo" (Van Halen song), 2012
- "Tattoo" (The Who song), 1967
- "Tattoo", by Ava Max from Heaven & Hell, 2020
- "Tattoo", by Faster Pussycat from Wake Me When It's Over, 1989
- "Tattoo", by Gang of Four from Shrinkwrapped, 1995
- "Tattoo", by Janis Ian from Breaking Silence, 1993
- "Tattoo", by Rammstein from their untitled album, 2019
- "Tattoo", by Taio Cruz from TY.O, 2011
- "Tattoos", by Caravan Palace from <|°_°|>, 2015

== Military ==
- Tattoo (bugle call)
- Military tattoo, military drum performance or display
  - Heartland International Tattoo, an indoor arena performance in Hoffman Estates, Illinois
  - Royal Edinburgh Military Tattoo, a series of military tattoos held every August in Edinburgh, Scotland
  - Royal International Air Tattoo, a British airshow
  - Royal Nova Scotia International Tattoo, a large indoor show in Halifax Regional Municipality, Nova Scotia
  - Virginia International Tattoo, an annual exhibition held in Norfolk, Virginia
  - Basel Tattoo, an annual tattoo in Basel, Switzerland
- HMS Tattoo (J374), minesweeper
- HMAS Tattoo, S-class destroyer

== Technology ==
- HTC Tattoo, a phone manufactured by HTC Corporation
- Tattoo, locomotive design of Kerr, Stuart and Company
- Globe Tattoo, a mobile broadband brand by Globe Telecom as a competitor to Smart Bro

== Other uses ==
- Tattoo, rum product by Captain Morgan
- Tattoo, an archaic name for the Indian Country-bred pony

== See also ==
- t.A.T.u., a Russian pop duo
