= Storyman =

A storyman is a comic writer or cartoon screenwriter

- Storyman (band), duo from Ireland
- The Storyman, album by Chris de Burgh 2006
- Storyman (album), by bluegrass mandolin player Sam Bush 2016
- storyman.com, Neal Shusterman's website
