= Alexians =

Catholic religious congregation

Congregation of Alexian Brothers
- Congregatio Fratrum Cellitarum seu Alexianorum

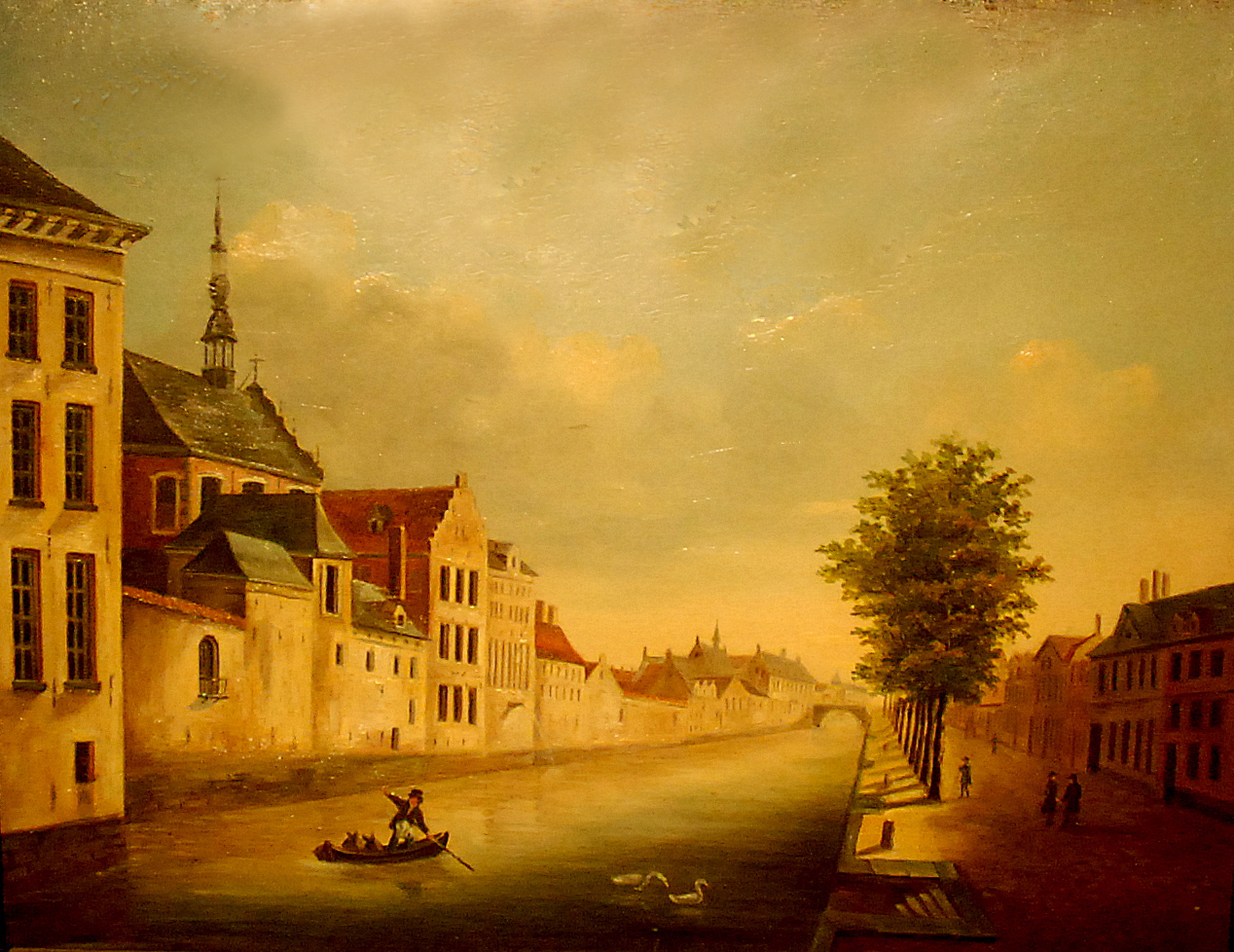
- Alexians monastery in Ghent (Belgium) on the former Oude Houtlei
- Abbreviation: C.F.A.
- Nickname: Alexians
- Named after: St Alexis
- Formation: 1334; 692 years ago
- Founded at: Aachen, Germany.
- Type: Lay Religious Congregation of Pontifical Right for men
- Purpose: Medical care of the sick poor people
- Headquarters: Generalate; 198 James Blvd, Signal Mountain, Tennessee
- Members: 48 members as of 2022
- Superior General: Br. Lawrence Krueger, C.F.A.
Countries present
Germany, Belgium England Ireland	Philippines Hungary United States
- Motto: Latin: Caritas Christi Urget Nos; English: The love of Christ inspires us
- Patron: St Alexis
- Parent organization: Catholic Church
- Website: alexianbrothers.org

The Alexians, or Cellites, officially named as the Congregation of Alexian Brothers (Latin: Congregatio Fratrum Cellitarum seu Alexianorum), abbreviated C.F.A., is a Catholic lay religious congregation of Pontifical Right for men, specifically devoted to caring for the sick. The congregation has its origin in Europe at the time of the Black Death. Its members follow the Rule of Saint Augustine.

== History ==
The Alexians trace their origin to the early 12th-century Beghards, male counterparts of the Beguines, laywomen who followed a devout style of life that included a limited degree of life in common. The men first came to prominence in the city of Mechelen, in the Duchy of Brabant (in central Flanders, now Belgium), during the 14th century, during the terrible ravages of the Black Death. To face this challenge, some laymen united under the guidance of a man named Tobias to succor the plague-stricken. They did not take vows or adopt the practices of monastic life. One of their most obvious activities was caring for those stricken with the bubonic plague, caring also for the victims' families, and burying those who died. These laymen lived in small rooms or cells (from Latin "cella", a cell), which gave rise to their early name of "Cellites". (Note: But note that the Catholic Encyclopedia (1913) states instead that "One of their most obvious actions [was] the burial of those who died from the plague; they were known as 'Cellites' (Lat. cella, a cell and hence, a grave)".)

The speculation that the name "Beghards" arose from supporting themselves by begging for food was dismissed by the Encyclopædia Britannica Eleventh Edition.

Part of the popular reaction to the plague, was that plague victims became the outcasts of the society and were driven outside the city walls, along with the other marginalized folk, to die, bereft of the assistance of the civic authorities and even the pastoral care of the Church. Moved by compassion, these new companies of laymen came together, dedicated to taking care of such victims. Later on, the group attracted more men who chose to abandon their secular lives to live in community as brothers and to serve the needs of the poor. Eventually, the Church saw the utility of the brothers and they came to be formally recognized as religious, eventually acquiring pontifical status. The brothers were associated with a chapel dedicated to Alexius of Rome, who had served many years in a hospital at Edessa in Syria, and they began to be called the Brothers at St. Alexius Chapel, a name that evolved into that of Alexian Brothers, their modern name.

=== Germany ===
The Brothers rapidly spread throughout Germany, Brabant, Flanders, and other countries. They were also styled in Middle Dutch lollebroeders "mumbling brothers", or "Lollhorden", from Old German: lollon, meaning "to lull, to sing softly", from their chants for the dead. This name was later adopted as a term of contempt, applied first to elements among the Franciscans and later to the heretical followers of John Wycliffe. The Alexians did not escape calumny and persecution, as demonstrated from the papal bull "Ad Audientiam Nostram" (2 December 1377) which Pope Gregory XI sent to the German bishops, especially those of Cologne, Trier and Mainz, against disruption of the "Cellites" and calling for their persecutors to be punished. This was followed by Bulls of a similar tenor from Pope Boniface IX on 7 January 1396, Pope Eugene IV on 12 May 1431, Pope Nicholas V and Pope Pius II.

In 1469, the motherhouse of the Alexians at Aachen voiced the general feeling of the Brothers in asking Louis de Bourbon, Bishop of Liège, to raise that house to a convent of the Order of Saint Augustine. The request was granted, and in 1854 Father Dominicus Brock and five of the Brothers took the solemn vows of religious under the rule of St. Augustine. This step and a revised texts of their constitutions led to there being confirmed as a Catholic religious institute by Pope Pius IX on 12 September 1870.

=== Hospitals ===
In the early 20th century the Alexian Brothers had four hospitals in the United States. A first hospital in the United States, was built in Chicago in 1866; it was destroyed by the Great Fire, on 9 October 1871, and rebuilt the following year. A second hospital, erected at St. Louis in 1869, covered an acre with its departments for the insane, nervous diseases, and inebriates. A third was in Oshkosh, Wisconsin, built in 1880. A fourth was built in Elizabeth, New Jersey, on land given for that purpose by Winand Wigger. Competent surgeons and physicians attended to the patients, and the Brothers nursed and did the housework of the hospitals. In this way, by the early 20th century the Alexian Brothers had four hospitals in the United States. in 1965, Later in the century, a fifth hospital was built in San Jose, California.

Today, the Chicago hospital has become the Alexian Brothers Medical Center and Rehabilitation Hospital in Elk Grove Village, Illinois, the St. Alexius Medical Center in Hoffman Estates, Illinois, and the Alexian Brothers Behavioral Health Hospital in Hoffman Estates. These also operate satellite centers and clinics around Illinois. In Missouri, Tennessee and Wisconsin the Alexians run a group of facilities, care systems, homes and communities all for older adults. The other hospitals have been sold or closed.

Elsewhere, Bishop Herbert Vaughan of the Diocese of Salford, England invited the Alexians to take charge of a new home and hospital in his diocese, which led to their establishing themselves in England in June 1875. Subsequently, Richard Lacy, Bishop of Middlesbrough, secured them for his diocese in 1884. In 1885, the Brothers established a province of their congregation and a novitiate in the United Kingdom. The latter, first attached to St. Mary's Convent, Newton Heath, Manchester, was later transferred to West Twyford, near Ealing, which the Alexian Brothers had purchased in 1902. The brothers sold Twyford Abbey in 1988, and the abbey, which is a Grade II listed building, now lies derelict.

== Present situation ==
The Immaculate Conception Province (the American Province) sponsors Alexian Brothers Health System, which provides services in acute care, residential elderly care, retirement centers, and AIDS ministry in Illinois, Missouri, Wisconsin, Tennessee, and also outside the US in the Philippines and Hungary. In 2012 the Alexian Brothers Health System became part of Ascension Health.

The contemporary British houses in London and Manchester, as well as the Irish ones in Dublin and Limerick, include facilities for the elderly sick and physically handicapped through a nursing home and Day Centre; an AIDS ministry; care and rehabilitation of homeless men; and support for people suffering from mental illness.

On the European continent the contemporary German branch has houses in Aachen, Krefeld, Malseneck, Münster and Twistringen. In Belgium they have centres in Boechout, Tienen, Grimbergen and Henri-Chapelle, where they provide psychiatric services.
