= I Want Crazy (album) =

Compilation album by Hunter Hayes
- Released: April 3, 2015
- Recorded: 2011–15
- Genre: Country; country pop; pop rock
- Label: Atlantic
- Producer: Hunter Hayes; Dann Huff; Ryan Tedder; Duck Blackwell

Hunter Hayes chronology
Storyline (2014)	I Want Crazy (2015)	21 (2015)

Singles from I Want Crazy
- 1. "Light Me Up" Released: March 13, 2015; 2. "Tattoo" Released: March 23, 2015; 3. "I Want Crazy" Released: April 17, 2015

I Want Crazy is a compilation album by American country music singer Hunter Hayes, first released on April 3, 2015 by Atlantic Records. The album serves as Hayes' international debut studio album. I Want Crazy features songs from Hayes' two studio albums, Hunter Hayes (2011) and Storyline (2014), with two of the songs being re-produced by Ryan Tedder ("I Want Crazy") and Duck Blackwell ("Light Me Up"), respectively. The album entered the UK Albums Chart compiled by the Official Charts Company at number 85 for the week ending June 6, 2015.

== Track listing ==
No.	Title	Writer(s)	Producer(s)	Length
1.	"I Want Crazy" (Ryan Tedder mix)	Hunter Hayes; Lori McKenna; Troy Verges	Dann Huff; Hayes; Tedder^{[a]}	3:15
2.	"Invisible"	Hayes; Bonnie Baker; Katrina Elam	Huff; Hayes; Duck Blackwell^{[b]}	4:34
3.	"Tattoo" (UK version)	Hayes; Verges; Barry Dean	Huff; Hayes; Blackwell^{[b]}	3:21
4.	"Light Me Up"	Hayes; busbee; Shane McAnally	Huff; Hayes; Blackwell^{[b]}	3:27
5.	"Wanted"	Hayes; Verges	Huff; Hayes; Blackwell^{[b]}	3:44
6.	"You Think You Know Somebody"	Hayes; Sam Ellis	Huff; Hayes	4:26
7.	"Secret Love"	Hayes; Ellis	Huff; Hayes	3:38
8.	"What You Gonna Do"	Hayes	Huff; Hayes	4:48
9.	"Everybody's Got Somebody but Me" (featuring Jason Mraz)	Hayes; Dave Brainard; Jennifer Zuffineti	Huff; Hayes	2:39
10.	"Somebody's Heartbreak"	Hayes; Andrew Dorff; Luke Laird	Huff; Hayes	3:37

Notes

- ^{^[a]} signifies a remixer
- ^{^[b]} signifies a co-producer

== Personnel ==
- Duck Blackwell - drums, percussion, bass, synthesizer, effects
- Eric Darken - percussion
- Sam Ellis - backing vocals
- Paul Franklin - steel guitar
- Charlie Judge - synthesizer
- Tony Lucido - bass
- Devin Malone - guitar
- Nir Z - drums, percussion
- Steve Sinatra - percussion
- Matt Utterback - bass
- Hunter Hayes - piano, electric guitar, acoustic guitar, resonator guitar, mandolin, bouzouki, accordion, vocals

== Charts ==
Chart (2015)	Peak position
UK Albums (OCC)	85

== Release history ==
Country	Date	Format	Label	Catalog No.	Ref.
Australia	April 3, 2015	Digital download	Atlantic Records	—	
Belgium	May 6, 2015	Digital download	Atlantic Records	—	
France	May 6, 2015	Digital download	Atlantic Records	—	
Germany	May 6, 2015	Digital download	Atlantic Records	—	
Ireland	May 6, 2015	Digital download	Atlantic Records	—	
United Kingdom	May 6, 2015	Digital download	Atlantic Records	—	
Worldwide	June 2, 2015	CD	Atlantic Records	B00VKS9QA6	
