= 21 (EP) =

EP by Hunter Hayes
- Released: August 7, 2015 (Streaming)
- Recorded: 2015
- Genre: Country; country pop; pop rock
- Label: Atlantic Nashville
- Producer: Dann Huff; Hunter Hayes

Hunter Hayes chronology
I Want Crazy (2015)	21 (2015)	The 21 Project (2015)

Singles from 21
- 1. "21" Released: May 21, 2015

21 is the second extended play by American country music artist Hunter Hayes, released to streaming services on August 7, 2015. It is expected to be made available to digital retailers at a later date and serves as a prelude to Hayes's forthcoming third studio album, scheduled for released in the fall of 2015. 21 includes all of the digital-only singles releases from Hayes Spotify-exclusive "The Drop" campaign, led by the project's eponymous lead single, "21", released on May 21, 2015.

== Background and conception ==
In May 2015, Hayes released his then-new single, "21", exclusively to streaming service Spotify (and, later, digital music platform iTunes). The distribution strategy was part of an experiment to inspire country music to adapt to the digital era, as Hayes explained in an interview with Billboard, and as a way to "get music to the fans in a quicker and more exciting fashion." He unveiled plans to release a series of digital-exclusive singles, with no proper album planned at the time. This campaign became known as "The Drop." Hayes told Billboard that "this [current] music wasn't created with an album in mind," but his management team confirmed to the magazine that a conventional physical album was expected to be released in the fall of 2015. After the first four singles were released individually, they were incorporated into a six-track extended play along with the final two tracks of Hayes's "The Drop" campaign; this collection, titled 21, was released on Spotify on August 7, 2015.

== Promotion ==
Hayes will embark upon the 21 Tour in the fall of 2015, visiting 21 cities across the United States in support of the EP and its eponymous single.

=== Singles ===
"21" was released to Spotify and country radio on May 21, 2015 as the lead single from the EP and forthcoming album; it was released to digital retailers on May 26, 2015. As of August 2015, it was the third-most streamed country song on Spotify. The single has so far peaked within the top 30 on both Hot Country Songs and Country Airplay, as well as number 14 on the Bubbling Under Hot 100 Singles extension chart.

=== Other songs ===
Three other songs were issued as promotional singles to Spotify and then to iTunes – "Where It All Begins", featuring Lady Antebellum, on June 8, 2015; "Young and in Love" on June 23, 2015; and "Someday Girl" on July 10, 2015.

== Track listing ==
No.	Title	Writer(s)	Length
1.	"21"	Dallas Davidson; Kelley Lovelace; Ashley Gorley; Hunter Hayes^{[a]}	3:13
2.	"Where It All Begins" (featuring Lady Antebellum)	Hayes; Dave Haywood; Charles Kelley; Hillary Scott	3:31
3.	"Young and in Love"	Hayes; Dave Barnes	3:49
4.	"Someday Girl"	Hayes; Troy Verges	3:40
5.	"Saint or a Sinner"	Hayes; Lori McKenna; Barry Dean	3:11
6.	"The Trouble with Love"	Hayes; McKenna	3:47

Notes

- ^{^[a]} Hayes is given an honorary co-writing credit for his changes to the arrangement.

== Charts ==
=== Singles ===
Year	Single	Peak chart positions			
Year	Single	US Country	US Country Airplay	US Bubble	CAN
2015	"21"	26	21	14	65

=== Other songs ===
"Where It All Begins" charted at number 45 on the Billboard Hot Country Songs chart in July 2015.
