= Lights Out (Ingrid Michaelson album) =

Studio album by Ingrid Michaelson
- Released: April 15, 2014
- Length: 54:26
- Label: Cabin 24; Mom + Pop
- Producer: Chris Kuffner; Cason Cooley; Katie Herzig; Jacquire King; Jeremy Bose; Dan Romer

Ingrid Michaelson chronology
Human Again (2012)	Lights Out (2014)	It Doesn't Have to Make Sense (2016)

Singles from Lights Out
- 1. "Girls Chase Boys" Released: February 4, 2014; 2. "Afterlife" Released: October 2, 2014; 3. "Time Machine" Released: February 19, 2015

Lights Out is the fifth studio album by American singer-songwriter Ingrid Michaelson. It was released on April 15, 2014 through Cabin 24 Records under exclusive license to Mom + Pop Music. Her first studio album in four years, Lights Out marked a breakaway from previous releases on which Michaelson had been credited as the sole writer. A more collaborative effort, she worked with a variety of songwriters and producers on the album, including Cason Cooley, Katie Herzig, Jacquire King, and Dan Romer.

The album earned generally positive reviews from music critics, some of whom declared it her best album yet, though others felt it had too many ballads. Lights Out debuted at number 5 on the US Billboard 200 chart, selling 37,000 copies in its first week. The lead single from the album, "Girls Chase Boys", was released on February 4, 2014. The second single from the album, "Afterlife", was released on October 2, 2014. The third single, "Time Machine", was released on February 19, 2015. A deluxe edition of Lights Out was released on November 11, 2014.

== Critical reception ==
Professional ratings
Aggregate scores
Source	Rating
Metacritic	74/100
Review scores
Source	Rating
AllMusic	4/5 stars
The Guardian	3/5 stars
The Oakland Press	3/4 stars
PopMatters	5/10 stars
Sputnikmusic	4/5

Lights Out received positive reviews from music critics upon its release. At Metacritic, which assigns a normalized rating out of 100 to reviews from mainstream critics, the album has received an average score of 74, based on 5 reviews, indicating "generally positive reviews" feedback. Steven Morse from The Boston Globe found that with Lights Out Michaelson "has made her best album. She lost her voice for several months last year, so she has a new appreciation of her gift. Her voice is deeper and more soulful. And she still employs girlish “ooh-ooh” harmonies, but the result is more adult, at times like an ethereal Kate Bush [...] You might expect a schizoid clusterbomb from Lights Out, but instead it’s an impressively seamless mix." AllMusic editor Matt Collar rated the album four stars out of five. He stated how the release shows "Michaelson has captured that sound of love."

Oakland Press critic Gary Graff rated the album three stars out of four. He found that the release was "filled with emotional heavy lifting" and features "Michaelson's use of choral arrangements throughout is just one of the elements that remind us of what a clever artist she is while also pushing her in fresh directions." Tshepo Mokoena from The Guardian felt that Michaelson's decision to consult co-writers was making "for a mixed bag. When it works, Michaelson sounds enchanting, cooing in chromatic, St. Vincent-like scales on "Handsome Hands". When it doesn’t, she slumps into MOR balladry [...] Unfortunately, she loses her way slightly here, letting overused chord progressions and sweet but uninspired melodies overpower her indie quirk." Similarly, The Independent's Andy Gill wrote: "Michaelson’s most interesting musical strategies occur away from the mainstream, in things like the blending of Omnichord and French horn in "Handsome Hands"; but Lights Out eventually runs out of steam, lapsing into dull piano ballads."

== Commercial performance ==
The album entered the Billboard 200 chart at number 5, with first-week sales of 37,000 copies. It also debuted at number 2 on Top Rock Albums and marked Michaelson's second consecutive album after Human Again (2012) to debut at number one on Billboard's Independent Albums chart. By August, Lights Out had sold 160,000 copies in the United States.

== Track listing ==
Lights Out track listing
No.	Title	Writer(s)	Producer(s)	Length
1.	"Home"	Ingrid Michaelson	Chris Kuffner	4:24
2.	"Girls Chase Boys"	Michaelson; Trent Dabbs; Barry Dean	Cason Cooley; Katie Herzig	3:41
3.	"Wonderful Unknown" (featuring Greg Laswell)	Michaelson; Dabbs; Dean	Cooley; Herzig	5:01
4.	"You Got Me" (featuring Storyman)	Michaelson; Kevin May; Mick Lynch	Kuffner	3:13
5.	"Warpath"	Michaelson	Kuffner	2:27
6.	"Handsome Hands"	Michaelson	Kuffner	3:26
7.	"Time Machine"	Michaelson; Dabbs; busbee	Jacquire King	3:32
8.	"One Night Town" (featuring Mat Kearney)	Michaelson; Kearney	Cooley	3:14
9.	"Open Hands" (featuring Trent Dabbs)	Michaelson; Dabbs	Jeremy Bose	4:06
10.	"Ready to Lose" (featuring Trent Dabbs)	Michaelson; Dabbs	Bose	3:33
11.	"Stick"	Michaelson; Dabbs	Bose	3:35
12.	"Afterlife"	Michaelson; Brian Lee; Adam Pallin	King	4:04
13.	"Over You" (featuring A Great Big World)	Michaelson; Ian Axel; Chad Vaccarino	Dan Romer	4:43
14.	"Everyone Is Gonna Love Me Now"	Michaelson; Dabbs	Bose	5:17
Total length:				54:26

Lights Out – Deluxe edition
No.	Title	Writer(s)	Producer(s)	Length
15.	"My Darling"	Michaelson; Herzig	Cooley; Herzig	4:22
16.	"Over You" (demo)	Michaelson; Axel; Vaccarino	Romer	4:03
17.	"When I Go"	Michaelson	Kuffner	3:12
18.	"(I'll Be Glad When You're Dead)"	Sam Theard	Kuffner	2:21
19.	"Skinny Love" (live)	Justin Vernon	Kuffner	4:23
20.	"Everyone Is Gonna Love Me Now" (demo)	Michaelson; Dabbs	Bose	5:06
Total length:				78:22

== Personnel ==
- Ian Axel – piano (13), vocals (13)
- Jeremy Bose – keyboards, programming
- Leslia Broussard – clapping, background vocals
- C.J. Camarieri – french horn, trumpet
- Adam Christgau – percussion
- Cason Cooley – electric guitar, percussion, piano, programming, synthesizer, background vocals
- Trent Dabbs – acoustic guitar (9,10), vocals (9,10)
- Eric Darken – percussion, programming
- Nathan Dugger – electric guitar
- Cara Fox – cello
- Lynn Grossman – clapping, stomping
- Katie Herzig – celeste, synthesizer, background vocals
- Felicia J. Hudson – clapping, background vocals
- Nadim Issa – Wurlitzer
- Elliot Jacobson – drums, percussion, stomping
- Mat Kearney – acoustic guitar, programming, synthesizer, vocals (8)
- Chad King – vocals (13)
- Jacquire King – clapping, stomping
- Chris Kuffner – bass guitar, clapping, e-bow, acoustic guitar, electric guitar, tenor guitar, harmonium, omnichord, programming, slide guitar, stomping, synthesizer, synthesizer bass, background vocals
- Jesse Kuffner – cello, violin
- Greg Laswell – vocals (3)
- Brian Lee – bass guitar, background vocals, whistle
- Stephen Leiweke – electric guitar
- Tony Lucido – bass guitar
- Jeremy Lutito – drums
- Mick Lynch – acoustic guitar, background vocals
- Saul Simon MacWilliams – clapping, organ, piano, stomping, synthesizer, trumpet, background vocals, Wurlitzer
- Kevin May – background vocals
- Ingrid Michaelson – clapping, omnichord, piano, stomping, lead vocals, background vocals
- Allie Moss – clapping, background vocals
- The Orphanage String Quartet – strings
- Adam Pallin – programming, keyboards, background vocals
- Wendy Parr – background vocals
- Bess Rogers – clapping, acoustic guitar, electric guitar, stomping, background vocals
- Dan Romer – bass guitar
- Gabe Scott – acoustic guitar, Hammer dulcimer, lap steel guitar
- F. Reid Shippen – programming
- Storyman – vocals (4)
- Hannah Winkler – clapping, background vocals

== Charts ==
=== Weekly charts ===
Weekly chart performance for Lights Out
Chart (2014)	Peak position
Canadian Albums (Billboard)	8
German Albums (Offizielle Top 100)	50
US Billboard 200	5
US Digital Albums (Billboard)	5
US Independent Albums (Billboard)	1
US Top Rock Albums (Billboard)	2

=== Year-end charts ===
Year-end chart performance for Lights Out
Chart (2014)	Position
US Billboard 200	199

== Release history ==
Lights Out release history
Region	Date	Edition(s)	Format(s)	Label(s)	Ref.
Various	April 15, 2014	Standard	Digital download; CD; streaming	Cabin 24; Mom + Pop	
Various	November 11, 2014	Deluxe	Digital download; CD; streaming	Cabin 24; Mom + Pop	
