= In My Daughter's Eyes =

Single by Martina McBride

from the album Martina
- Released: November 17, 2003
- Recorded: 2003
- Studio: Blackbird (Nashville, Tennessee)
- Genre: Country, country pop
- Length: 3:15
- Label: RCA Nashville
- Songwriter: James T. Slater
- Producers: Martina McBride; Paul Worley

Martina McBride singles chronology
"This One's for the Girls" (2003)	"In My Daughter's Eyes" (2003)	"How Far" (2004)

"In My Daughter's Eyes" is a song by American country music artist Martina McBride, recorded for her seventh studio album Martina (2003). The song was written by James T. Slater and was produced by McBride and Paul Worley. It was pushed to country radio by RCA Nashville as the second single from the album in November 2003.

The song became McBride's 18th top ten hit, peaking at number four on the US Hot Country Songs chart. A crossover hit, it also peaked at number three on Adult Contemporary and 39 on the all-genre Billboard Hot 100.

== Charts ==
"In My Daughter's Eyes" debuted at number 54 on the US Billboard Hot Country Songs chart the week of November 22, 2003. It would go on to peak at number four.

Chart (2003–2004)	Peak position
Canada Country (Radio & Records)	27 (Note: Canada Country began publishing on April 16, 2004, after "In My Daughter's Eyes" had peaked.)
US Billboard Hot 100	39
US Adult Contemporary (Billboard)	3
US Hot Country Songs (Billboard)	4

=== Year-end charts ===
Chart (2004)	Position
US Country Songs (Billboard)	35

== Certifications ==
Region	Certification
United States (RIAA)	Gold
