= Girls Chase Boys =

Single by Ingrid Michaelson

from the album Lights Out
- Released: February 4, 2014
- Recorded: 2014
- Genre: Pop
- Length: 3:41
- Label: Cabin 24; Mom + Pop
- Songwriters: Ingrid Michaelson; Trent Dabbs; Barry Dean
- Producers: Cason Cooley; Katie Herzig

Ingrid Michaelson singles chronology
"Fire" (2012)	"Girls Chase Boys" (2014)	"Afterlife" (2014)

Music video
- Girls Chase Boys on YouTube

"Girls Chase Boys" is the lead single from Ingrid Michaelson's sixth studio album, Lights Out. The song peaked at number 52 on the Billboard Hot 100.

== Background ==
Michaelson spoke about the development of the song and stated,

"Girls Chase Boys" started out as a break-up song but took on a deeper meaning as I continued writing. More than just being about my experience, its focus shifted to include the idea that, no matter who or how we love, we are all the same. The video takes that idea one step further, and attempts to turn stereotypical gender roles on their head. Girls don't exclusively chase boys. We all know this. We all chase each other and in the end we are all chasing after the same thing: love.

It was written by Ingrid Michaelson, along with Trent Dabbs and Barry Dean.

== Commercial performance ==
This song became Michaelson's highest-charting single and biggest airplay hit since "The Way I Am" hit number 37 in 2007, peaking at number 52 on the Billboard Hot 100, as well as her highest appearance on the Adult Pop Songs chart (number 6). It is also her first appearance on the magazine's Pop Songs chart, debuting at number 40 and reaching number 25. It reached number 38 on the Hot 100 Airplay (Radio Songs) chart, her first single to list on that chart.

== Music video ==
The official music video for "Girls Chase Boys" was released on February 4, 2014. It is a homage to Robert Palmer's 1988 video for "Simply Irresistible", featuring different genders in the dancer roles instead of just women.

== Charts ==
=== Weekly charts ===
Chart (2014)	Peak position
Canada Hot 100 (Billboard)	69
Czech Republic Singles Digital (ČNS IFPI)	56
Slovakia Singles Digital (ČNS IFPI)	68
US Billboard Hot 100	52
US Hot Rock & Alternative Songs (Billboard)	7
US Adult Alternative Airplay (Billboard)	12
US Adult Contemporary (Billboard)	11
US Adult Pop Airplay (Billboard)	6
US Pop Airplay (Billboard)	25

=== Year-end charts ===
Chart (2014)	Position
US Adult Alternative Songs (Billboard)	45
US Adult Contemporary (Billboard)	28
US Adult Top 40 (Billboard)	16

== Certifications ==
Region	Certification	Certified units/sales
United States (RIAA)	Platinum	1,000,000^{‡}
^{‡} Sales+streaming figures based on certification alone.
