= Sunderlage Farm Smokehouse =

- U.S. National Register of Historic Places
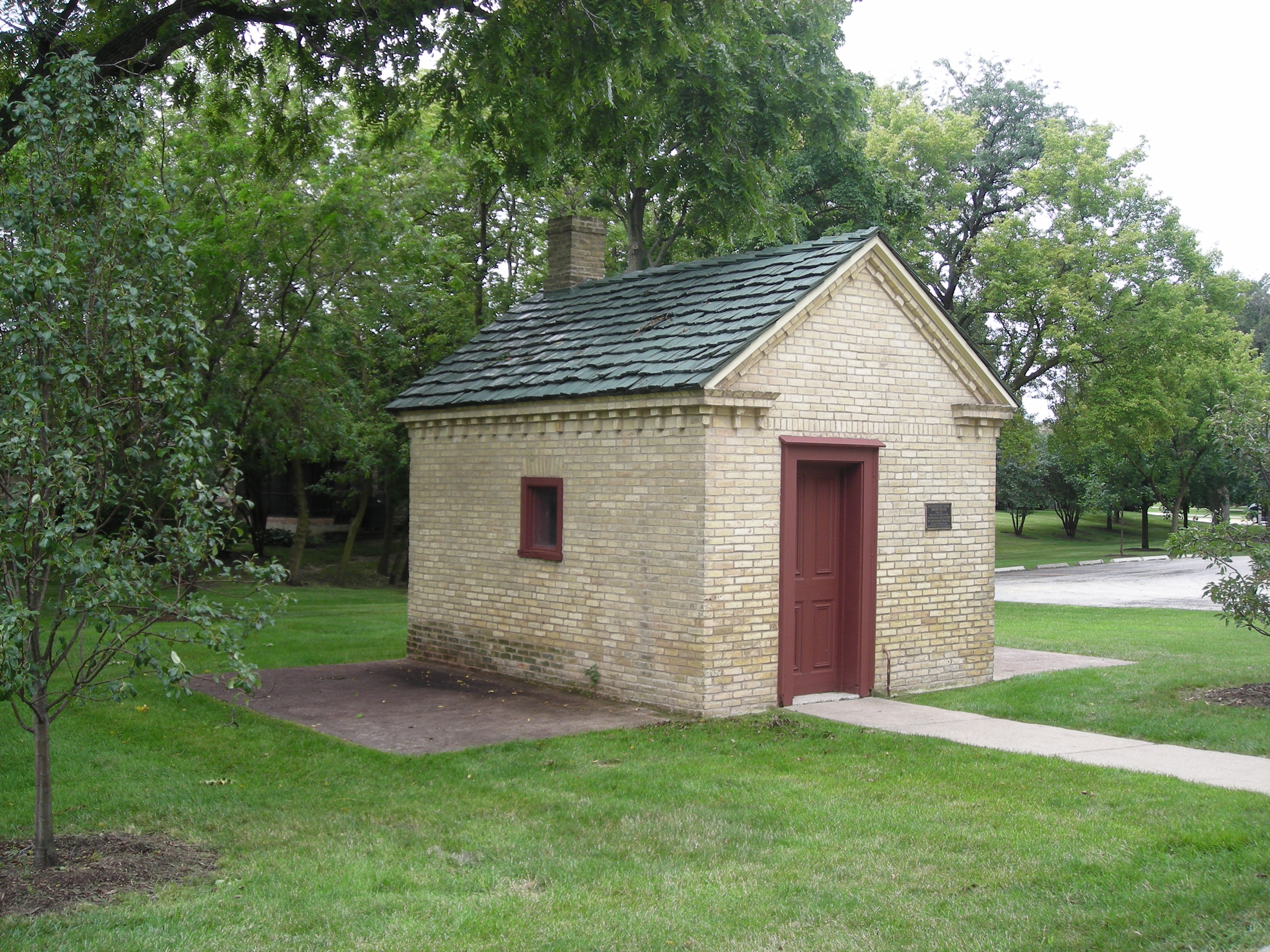

- Location within Chicago metropolitan area Location within Illinois Location within the United States
- Location: 1775 Vista Walk, Hoffman Estates, Illinois
- Coordinates: 42°03′05″N 88°07′24″W
- Area: 0.3 acres (0.12 ha)
- Built: 1860
- Architectural style: Greek Revival
- NRHP reference No.: 89001210
- Added to NRHP: February 20, 1990

The Sunderlage Farm Smokehouse is a historic smokehouse at 1775 Vista Walk in Hoffman Estates, Illinois.

The smokehouse was built circa 1860 as part of the Sunderlage Farm; it and the farmhouse are the only remaining farm buildings in Hoffman Estates. The smokehouse, which was used to cure and hold the farm's meat supply, is well-preserved compared to other surviving contemporary smokehouses in northeastern Illinois.

Its functional design uses the then-popular Greek Revival style and includes brick detailing below the roof line.

While the area that is now Hoffman Estates was rural for much of the early nineteenth and early twentieth centuries, its farms were subdivided into suburban housing in the 1960s. The smokehouse was added to the National Register of Historic Places on February 20, 1990.
