= The 21 Project =

Studio album by Hunter Hayes
- Released: November 6, 2015
- Genre: Country; country pop; pop rock
- Label: Atlantic Nashville
- Producer: Dann Huff; Hunter Hayes

Hunter Hayes chronology
21 (2015)	The 21 Project (2015)	Wild Blue (Part I) (2019)

Singles from The 21 Project
- 1. "21" Released: May 21, 2015

The 21 Project is the third studio album by American country music artist Hunter Hayes, released in physical format on November 6, 2015 through Atlantic Nashville. Hayes co-produced the collection with Dann Huff. The album includes five songs from his similarly-titled EP, 21, released earlier that year, as well as two new tracks. Each song is available as a studio recording, an acoustic recording, and a live performance from the Wheels Up Tour.

== Background ==
In May 2015, Hayes released the project's lead single, "21", exclusively to streaming service Spotify (and later to digital music platforms including iTunes) in an effort to inspire country music to adapt to new, digital forms of music distribution. Over the next two months, he released a series of additional one-off singles that were then incorporated into an extended play, also titled 21, that was released on Spotify on August 7, 2015. Hayes told Billboard that "this [current] music wasn't created with an album in mind," but his management team confirmed to the magazine that a conventional physical album was expected to be released in the fall of 2015. Warner Music officially announced said album, The 21 Project, in a press release dated October 12, 2015, and was released on November 6, 2015.

Hayes told country music blog The Boot that due to the way it developed, he's "trying not to call [The 21 Project] a record," but thinks of it more as a box set or an art project. According to him, the goal of the project was to "bring the focus back to the music," and to demonstrate how a song evolves "from its original form into something we play on stage." The songs were all rearranged for the acoustic and live performances.

== Track listing ==
Disc 1
No.	Title	Writer(s)	Length
1.	"21"	Dallas Davidson; Kelley Lovelace; Ashley Gorley	3:15
2.	"Young and in Love"	Hunter Hayes; Dave Barnes	3:50
3.	"Saint or a Sinner"	Hayes; Lori McKenna; Barry Dean	3:10
4.	"Where It All Begins" (featuring Lady Antebellum)	Hayes; Dave Haywood; Charles Kelley; Hillary Scott	3:33
5.	"Suitcase"	Hayes; Ross Copperman; Gorley	3:46
6.	"The Trouble with Love"	Hayes; McKenna	3:57
7.	"I Mean You"	Hayes; Jimmy Robbins; Gorley	3:12

Disc 2
No.	Title	Writer(s)	Length
1.	"21" (Acoustic)	Davidson; Lovelace; Gorley; Hayes	3:19
2.	"Young and in Love" (Acoustic)	Hayes; Barnes	4:15
3.	"Saint or a Sinner" (Acoustic)	Hayes; McKenna; Dean	3:09
4.	"Where It All Begins" (Acoustic)	Hayes; Haywood; Kelley; Scott	3:46
5.	"Suitcase" (Acoustic)	Hayes; Copperman; Gorley	5:24
6.	"The Trouble with Love" (Acoustic)	Hayes; McKenna	3:48
7.	"I Mean You" (Acoustic)	Hayes; Robbins; Gorley	3:09

Disc 3
No.	Title	Writer(s)	Length
1.	"21" (Live - Wheels Up 2015 Tour)	Davidson; Lovelace; Gorley; Hayes	4:01
2.	"Young and in Love" (Live - Wheels Up 2015 Tour)	Hayes; Barnes	3:52
3.	"Saint or a Sinner" (Live - Wheels Up 2015 Tour)	Hayes; McKenna; Dean	3:19
4.	"Where It All Begins" (Live - Wheels Up 2015 Tour)	Hayes; Haywood; Kelley; Scott	3:54
5.	"Suitcase" (Live - Wheels Up 2015 Tour)	Hayes; Copperman; Gorley	3:34
6.	"The Trouble with Love" (Live - Wheels Up 2015 Tour)	Hayes; McKenna	3:59
7.	"I Mean You" (Live - Wheels Up 2015 Tour)	Hayes; Robbins; Gorley	3:25

== Personnel ==
- Justin Eason - bouzouki, acoustic guitar, electric guitar, mandolin, background vocals
- Hunter Hayes - bouzouki, drum programming, acoustic guitar, bass guitar, electric guitar, resonator guitar, mandola, mandolin, percussion, synthesizer, lead vocals, background vocals
- Dave Haywood - mandolin and vocals on "Where It All Begins"
- Charles Kelley - vocals on "Where It All Begins"
- Devin Malone - banjo, cello, acoustic guitar, electric guitar, resonator guitar, slide guitar, background vocals
- Luke Moller - violin
- Hillary Scott - vocals on "Where It All Begins"
- Andy Sheridan - accordion, Fender Rhodes, acoustic guitar, Hammond B-3 organ, keyboards, piano, synthesizer, background vocals, Wurlitzer
- Steve Sinatra - drums, percussion, background vocals
- Matt Utterback - bass guitar, upright bass, synthesizer bass
- Nir Z. - drums

== Charts ==
The album debuted at No. 16 on Top Country Albums, and No. 93 on Billboard 200, selling 5,300 copies in its first week. The album has sold 12,400 copies in the United States as of December 2015.

=== Album ===
Chart (2015)	Peak position
US Billboard 200	93
US Top Country Albums (Billboard)	16

=== Singles ===
Year	Single	Peak chart positions			
Year	Single	US Country	US Country Airplay	US Bubble	CAN
2015	"21"	26	21	14	65

=== Other songs ===
"Where It All Begins" also charted at number 45 on the Billboard Hot Country Songs chart in July 2015.
