= How Far =

Single by Martina McBride

from the album Martina
- Released: April 19, 2004
- Recorded: 2003
- Studio: Money Pit (Nashville, Tennessee); Blackbird (Nashville, Tennessee)
- Genre: Country
- Length: 3:57
- Label: RCA Nashville
- Songwriters: Ed Hill; Jamie O'Neal; Shaye Smith
- Producers: Martina McBride; Paul Worley

Martina McBride singles chronology
"In My Daughter's Eyes" (2003)	"How Far" (2004)	"Trip Around the Sun" (2004)

Music video
- "How Far" on YouTube

"How Far" is a song by American country music artist Martina McBride. It was written by Ed Hill, Australian country musician Jamie O'Neal, and Shaye Smith, with production by McBride and Paul Worley. It was released on April 19, 2004, as the third official single from McBride's seventh studio album Martina (2003) by RCA Nashville Records.

It was less successful than the previous two singles, rising only to number 12 on the US Hot Country Songs chart. Its music video did however garner her a nomination at the 2005 CMT Music Awards for Female Video of the Year.

== Content ==
The protagonist has reached a breaking point with her partner's apathy towards their relationship. She has decided to walk away and asks him how far does she have to go to make him realize what is about to happen.

== Music video ==
The music video was directed by Trey Fanjoy and premiered in mid-2004. It was nominated for Female Video of the Year at the 2005 CMT Music Awards.

== Charts ==
"How Far" debuted at number 54 on the U.S. Billboard Hot Country Songs chart for the week of April 17, 2004.

Chart (2004)	Peak position
Canada Country (Radio & Records)	26
US Country Top 50 (Radio & Records)	11
US Hot Country Songs (Billboard)	12
US Billboard Hot 100	68
US Radio Songs (Billboard)	65

=== Year-end charts ===
Chart (2004)	Position
US Country Songs (Billboard)	55
