= Trip Around the Sun =

Single by Jimmy Buffett with Martina McBride

from the album License to Chill
- Released: August 16, 2004
- Genre: Country
- Length: 3:19
- Label: Mailboat; RCA Nashville
- Songwriters: Al Anderson; Stephen Bruton; Sharon Vaughn
- Producers: Mac McAnally; Michael Utley

Jimmy Buffett singles chronology
"Hey, Good Lookin'" (2004)	"Trip Around the Sun" (2004)	"Piece of Work" (2005)

Martina McBride singles chronology
"How Far" (2004)	"Trip Around the Sun" (2004)	"God's Will" (2004)

"Trip Around the Sun" is a song by American country music artists Jimmy Buffett and Martina McBride. It was released on August 16, 2004, as the second single from Buffett's 25th studio album License to Chill (2004) via Buffett's own Mailboat Records and McBride's RCA Nashville. The song was penned by Al Anderson, Stephen Bruton, and Sharon Vaughn, while production was handled by Mac McAnally and Michael Utley. "Trip Around the Sun" was originally recorded by Bruton in 1998 for his album Nothing But the Truth.

It peaked at number 20 on the US Hot Country Songs chart. It was Buffett's last top 40 hit on the country charts until his duet with Zac Brown Band, "Knee Deep", reached number one.

== Music video ==
The music video was directed by Trey Fanjoy. It was filmed near Charleston, South Carolina. The video premiered on CMT on November 7, 2004.

== Charts ==
The song debuted at number 45 on the U.S. Billboard Hot Country Singles & Tracks chart for the week of September 4, 2004. It peaked at number 20 on December 4, 2004.

=== Weekly charts ===
Weekly chart performance for "Trip Around the Sun"
Chart (2004)	Peak position
Canada Country (Radio & Records)	14
US Country Top 50 (Radio & Records)	18
US Hot Country Songs (Billboard)	20
US Bubbling Under Hot 100 (Billboard)	12

=== Year-end charts ===
Year-end chart performance for "Trip Around the Sun"
Chart (2004)	Position
US Country (Radio & Records)	88
US Country Songs (Billboard)	93
