= God's Will =

Single by Martina McBride

from the album Martina
- Released: November 26, 2004
- Genre: Country; Christian
- Length: 5:50 (album version); 4:49 (video version); 4:10 (radio edit)
- Label: RCA Nashville
- Songwriters: Barry Dean; Tom Douglas
- Producers: Martina McBride; Paul Worley

Martina McBride singles chronology
"Trip Around the Sun" (2004)	"God's Will" (2004)	"(I Never Promised You A) Rose Garden" (2005)

"God's Will" is a song recorded by American country music artist Martina McBride for her seventh studio album Martina (2003). The song was written by Barry Dean and Tom Douglas and produced by McBride and Paul Worley. McBride's label, RCA Nashville, began pushing the song to country radio in late November 2004 as the fourth and final single from the album.

== Music video ==
The music video was directed by Deaton-Flanigen Productions and premiered in late 2004. It was nominated for a Grammy Award for Best Short Form Music Video, becoming McBride's second nomination after "Concrete Angel" and her tenth overall nomination.

=== Synopsis ===
The video starts with a leaf floating in the wind, before landing on Martina (a reference to the opening of "Forrest Gump". McBride sits on a pew bench in the park with autumn leaves blowing in the wind. She starts singing and thinks back to a Halloween night when she met Will, a young, disabled boy who came trick-or-treating dressed as a bag of leaves. Later, it shows McBride and her daughter babysitting Will and playing a board game while his mother worked late. Later, McBride sees Will and his mom playing tee ball in their yard. Will and his mom eventually move away and before he gets into his car he gives McBride a drawing of him and her holding hands with the words "Me and God love you" written in crayon and she waves goodbye to him. The video ends with McBride sitting on the pew bench in the park, holding Will's drawing lovingly to her chest, and going to play with her daughter, while the leaf from the video's opening blows away and eventually lands in a river.

== Charts ==
"God's Will" debuted at number 56 on the U.S. Billboard Hot Country Songs chart for the week of December 4, 2004.

=== Weekly charts ===
Weekly chart performance for "God's Will"
Chart (2004–2005)	Peak position
Canada Country (Radio & Records)	19
US Country Top 50 (Radio & Records)	13
US Hot Country Songs (Billboard)	16
US Billboard Hot 100	85
US Radio Songs (Billboard)	75

=== Year-end charts ===
Year-end chart performance for "God's Will"
Chart (2005)	Position
US Country Songs (Billboard)	65
