= Trent Dabbs =

American singer-songwriter

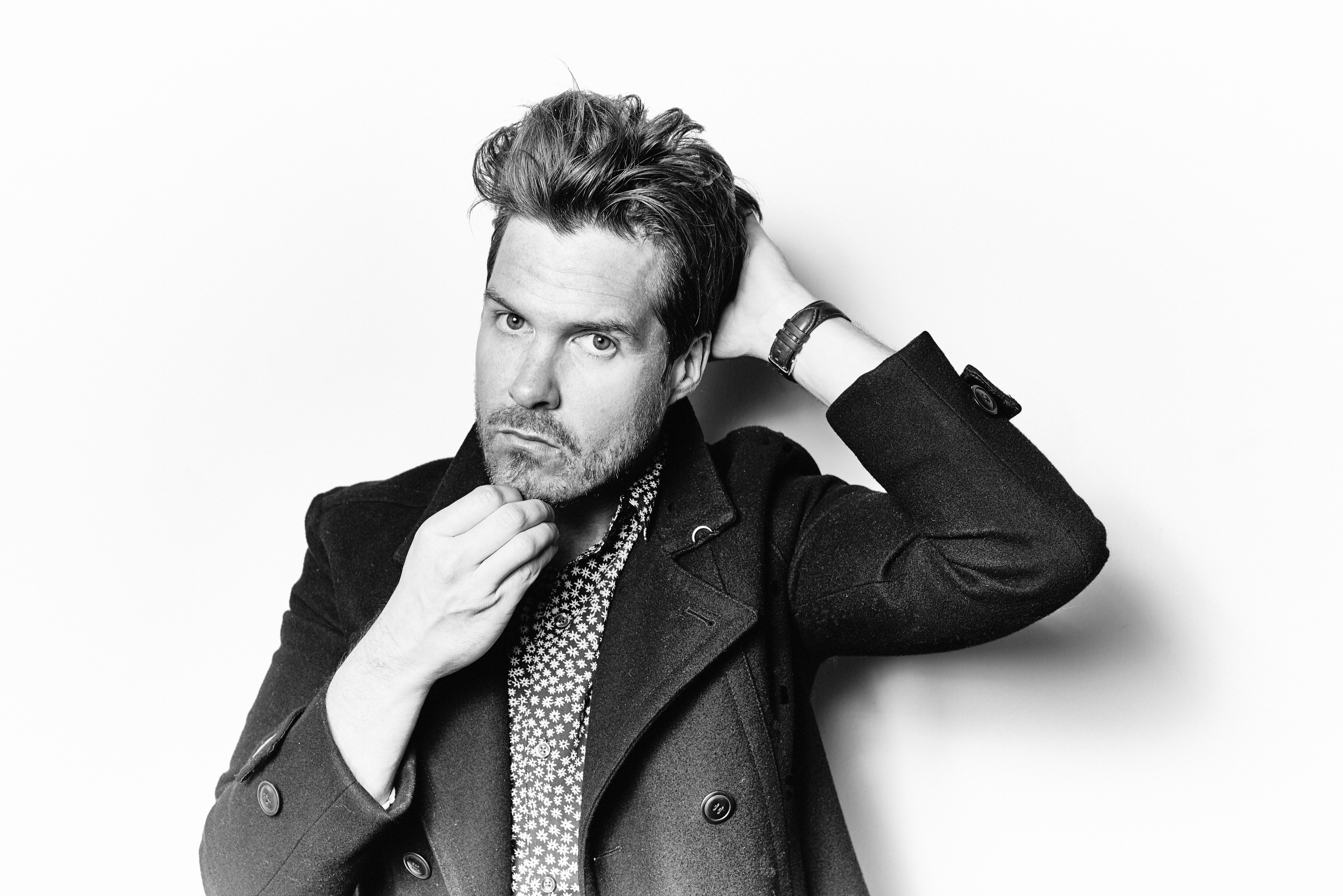

Background information
- Born: Trenton Kelly Dabbs
- Origin: Jackson, Mississippi
- Genres: Pop rock
- Occupations: Singer, songwriter
- Years active: 1999–present
- Label: Ready. Set. Records!
- Website: trentdabbs.com

Trent Dabbs is an American singer-songwriter who was raised in Jackson, Mississippi and is based in Nashville for his professional career. As a solo artist, Dabbs has released eleven albums, including his latest album, Positano, as well as a self-titled collaboration album with Ashley Monroe since his move to Nashville. His songs have been played in several TV shows, including Grey's Anatomy, Private Practice, One Tree Hill, Vampire Diaries, Pretty Little Liars, Parenthood, American Idol, So You Think You Can Dance, and commercials for Crate & Barrel and Zales. He also co-produced and co-wrote many of the songs from Pure Country: Pure Heart.

== Career ==
In addition to Dabbs' career as a singer, he has also co-written several songs with other artists. Trent's songwriting credits include Ingrid Michaelson's Top 40 single, "Girls Chase Boys" released in February 2014, Kacey Musgraves' single, "High Horse" released in March 2018 and Coin's single "Growing Pains" released in 2018. He has written several songs that have been on ABC's Nashville including the songs "Undermine" and "Don't Put Dirt On My Grave Just Yet" that were both recorded by Hayden Panettiere and "Shine" that was recorded and released by Sam Palladio

Dabbs is also a co-founder of the musical collective Ten Out of Tenn, founded in 2005. In 2015, the collective celebrated its tenth anniversary, and sold out the Ryman Auditorium. In 2012, Trent released the debut album for his band, Sugar & The Hi Lows. He and his bandmate, solo artist, Amy Stroup also released a Holiday album, Snow Angel, in November 2012. The duo released its second album, High Roller in June 2015.

== Credits ==
Credits adapted from AllMusic.

Song	Year	Artist	Album
"Sensation"	2024	Better Than Ezra	Super Magick
“Next To Normal“	2022	Lucius	Second Nature
"Maybe We Never Die"	2021	Anderson East	Maybe We Never Die
"Drugs"	2021	Anderson East	Maybe We Never Die
"Falling"	2021	Anderson East	Maybe We Never Die
"Jet Black Pontiac"	2021	Anderson East	Maybe We Never Die
"Like Nothing Ever Happened"	2021	Anderson East	Maybe We Never Die
"Just You & I"	2021	Anderson East	Maybe We Never Die
"Madelyn"	2021	Anderson East	Maybe We Never Die
"Drive Away with You"	2021	Jill Andrews	Ellen
"Could've Been"	2021	Jill Andrews	Ellen
"Who Came to Play"	2021	Hey Steve	Steve The Party
"Run Through the City"	2021	Hey Steve	Steve The Party
"Clear Eyes"	2021	Mokita	
"Say It Now"	2021	Matt Kearney	Anywhere With You
"Anywhere With You"	2021	Matt Kearney	Anywhere With You
"All Good Things Return"	2021	DANIEL SAINT BLACK	
"Let It Hurt"	2021	DANIEL SAINT BLACK	
"heavenly light (work Tape)"	2021	Wilder Woods	
"Dried Up River"	2021	The Lone Bellow	
"Dream House"	2021	COIN	Rainbow Mixtape
"Hypnotica"	2021	COIN	Rainbow Mixtape
"How It Feels"	2021	COIN	Rainbow Mixtape
"Make It Stop"	2021	COIN	Rainbow Mixtape
"Petals on the Ground"	2021	Grace Lee	
"Lie With Me"	2020	Kree Harrison	Chosen Family Tree
"Call It Even"	2020	Jill Andrews	Thirties
"River Swimming"	2020	Jill Andrews	Thirties
"Papercut"	2020	Luna Aura	Three Cheers For The American Beauty
"Can't Look Back"	2020	Matt Kearney	
"sleepwalking"	2020	Mokita, Mike Kinsella	
"Follow No Leader"	2020	Arum Rae	
"Chains - Alt Version"	2020	Avi Kaplan	Lean On Me EP
"Banks"	2020	Needtobreathe	Out of Body
"Riding High"	2020	Needtobreathe	Out of Body
"Sympathy"	2020	SVRCINA	Elysian Fields
"Redhead"	2020	Carlee Hammack, Reba McEntire	If It Wasn't For You
"Love Is a Town"	2020	Josh Gilligan	Love Is a Town
"My Hallelujah"	2020	DANIEL SAINT BLACK	Velvet Hollywood
"When Things Break Apart"	2020	DANIEL SAINT BLACK	DANIEL SAINT BLACK
"Shadow"	2020	DANIEL SAINT BLACK	DANIEL SAINT BLACK
"Babe Ruth"	2020	COIN	Dreamland
"Youuu"	2020	COIN	Dreamland
"Reach Out"	2019	Bootstraps	Demo Love
"Have You Ever Seen a Boy Break Down?"	2019	Carlos Vara	Have You Ever Seen a Boy Break Down?
"Man on the Moon"	2019	Anna Graceman	
"Room For You"	2019	Joseph (band)	Good Luck, Kid
"Side Effects"	2019	Joseph (band)	Good Luck, Kid
"Green Eyes"	2019	Joseph (band)	Good Luck, Kid
"My Love Goes Out to You"	2019	Eli Teplin	
"English Boys"	2019	LUNA AURA	
"Sorry Now"	2019	Jill Andrews	
"When Does a Heart Move On"	2019	Joy Williams	Front Porch
"Someday Soon"	2019	Wilder Woods	Wilder Woods
"The Summit"	2019	Avi Kaplan	
"Sit Down, Who's Been Loving You"	2019	Arum Rae	
"Real Place"	2019	American Authors	Seasons
"Before I Go"	2019	American Authors	Seasons
"Bring It On Home"	2019	American Authors	Seasons
"Can't Stop Me Now"	2019	American Authors	Seasons
"Calm Me Down"	2019	American Authors	Seasons
"Stay Around"	2019	American Authors	Seasons
"The Fuss"	2018	Against The Current	Past Lives
"Black Jeans"	2018	Lucie Silvas	E.G.O.
"Beat of Your Own"	2018	Katie Herzig	Moment of Bliss
"Still Think About You"	2018	Heather Morgan	Borrowed Heart
"I Love You, But I Need Another Year"	2018	Liza Anne	Fine but Dying
"Turn For The Worse"	2018	Liza Anne	Fine but Dying
"Small Talks"	2018	Liza Anne	Fine but Dying
"I'm Tired You're Lonely"	2018	Liza Anne	Fine but Dying
"Deep Water"	2018	American Authors	
"High Horse"	2018	Kacey Musgraves	Golden Hour
"Growing Pains"	2018	COIN	
"Lovers On Display"	2017	Natalie Hemby	Puxico
"Time Honored Tradition"	2017	Natalie Hemby	Puxico
"Return"	2017	Natalie Hemby	Puxico
"Grand Restoration"	2017	Natalie Hemby	Puxico
"Paranoia"	2017	Liza Anne	Fine but Dying
"Closest To Me"	2017	Liza Anne	Fine but Dying
"Miss Prince"	2017	Republican Hair	
"Jaywalking"	2017	Republican Hair	
"Say Me"	2017	David Archuleta	Postcards in the Sky
"Other Things In Sight"	2017	David Archuleta	Postcards in the Sky
"Numb"	2017	David Archuleta	Postcards in the Sky
"Old Days"	2016	Ingrid Michaelson	It Doesn't Have to Make Sense
"Wanted It That Way"	2016	Kree Harrison	This Old Thing
"Loners"	2016	Arum Rae	Loners
"Wasn't My Time"	2016	Arum Rae	Loners
"Testifier"	2016	The Saint Johns	Dead Of Night
"Caught Me Dyin"	2016	The Saint Johns	Dead Of Night
"Slacker"	2016	Jillian Jacqueline	Prime
"Finest Hour"	2016	Jillian Jacqueline	Prime
"The One Thing I Did Right"	2016	Gabe Dixon	Turns To Gold
"Better Luck Next Time"	2015	Kopecky	Drug for the Modern Age
"Half Moon"	2015	Lindi Ortega	Faded Gloryville
"Let It Rain"	2015	Mat Kearney	Just Kids
"I'm Not Okay"	2015	Jill Andrews	The War Inside
"Girls Chase Boys"	2014	Ingrid Michaelson	Lights Out
"Time Machine"	2014	Ingrid Michaelson	Lights Out
"Stick"	2014	Ingrid Michaelson	Lights Out
"Open Hands"	2014	Ingrid Michaelson	Lights Out
"Ready To Lose"	2014	Ingrid Michaelson	Lights Out
"Everyone Is Gonna Love Me Now"	2014	Ingrid Michaelson	Lights Out
"Don't Put Dirt On My Grave Just Yet"	2014	Hayden Panettiere	Nashville Soundtrack
"Shine"	2013	Sam Palladio	Nashville Soundtrack
"Undermine"	2012	Hayden Panettiere & Charles Esten	Nashville Soundtrack
"Waves That Rolled You Under"	2013	Young Summer	Fever Dream EP
"Fever Dream"	2013	Young Summer	Fever Dream EP
"Why Try"	2013	Young Summer	Fever Dream EP
"Taken"	2014	Young Summer	Fever Dream EP
"Lifeline"	2009	Mat Kearney	City of Black & White
"Last One Leaving" – Single	2012	Tyler Bryant & the Shakedown	Example
"Add It Up"	2010	Andrew Belle	The Ladder
"Look So Easy"	2010	Dave Barnes	What We Want, What We Get
"Pop Gun"	2012	Erin McCarley	Stadium Electric
"Oh My Darlin"	2011	Katie Herzig	The Waking Sleep
"Holdin Us Back" – Single	2010	Katie Herzig	
"Rain Or Shine"	2010	Matthew Perryman Jones	The Distance in Between
"Out of Reach"	2009	Matthew Perryman Jones	
"Just You"	2011	Amy Stroup	The Other Side Of Love
"Chin Up"	2011	Amy Stroup	The Other Side Of Love
"Come On Back"	2011	Amy Stroup	The Other Side Of Love
"I'm In"	2011	Amy Stroup	The Other Side Of Love
"On A Day Just Like Today"	2012	Gabe Dixon	One Spark
"Shine"	2008	Ashley Monroe	
"Everything I Wanted"	2008	Ashley Monroe	
"Someday Our King Will Come"	2010	Natalie Grant	Love Revolution
"Charmed Life"	2012	Joy Williams	One of Those Days
"Turnaround"	2012	Joy Williams	"Songs From This" – EP
"Golden Thread"	2012	Joy Williams	"Songs From This" – EP
"We Are"	2012	Joy Williams	We Are (Single)
"More Than I Asked For"	2009	Joy Williams	More Than I Asked For
"10 Stories"	2009	Michelle Featherstone	Blue Bike
"Where My Head Is"	2009	Andy Davis	New History
"Believable Doubt"	2007	Andy Davis	Let The Woman
"Keep Faith"	2008	Matt Wertz	Under The Summer Sun
"Let Me Love You"	2008	Josh Wilson	Trying To Fit The Ocean in a Cup

== Discography ==
- Quite Often (2004)
- What's Golden Above Ground (2006)
- Ashley Monroe and Trent Dabbs (2007)
- Decade Fades (2008)
- Your Side Now (2010) (Produced by Thomas Doeve)
- Transition (2010) (Produced by Thomas Doeve)
- Southerner (2011) (Produced by Jeremy Bose)
- Future Like Snow (2012)
- The Way We Look at Horses (2013)
- Believer (2015)
- The Optimist (2016)
- Positano (2018)
- Ojai / Be Where You Are (2023)

== TV placements ==
Alias

- This Time Tomorrow

Bones

- Keep Me Young

Grey's Anatomy

- Your Side Now

Ghost Whisperer

- Inside These Lines

Nashville

- Don't Put Dirt on My Grave Just Yet
- Acting The Part
- Ammunition
- Undermine
- Shine

One Tree Hill

- Until You Won Me Over
- Inside These Lines
- Odds Of Being Alone
- Look Back On
- Same Way Twice
- This Time Tomorrow
- Take It All In
- Follow Suit
- Off We Go

Hawaii Five-0

- Leave To See

Life Unexpected

- Odds Of Being Alone

World Of Jenks

- Odds Of Being Alone

The Chase

- Call It What It Is

The Vampire Diaries

- Counting Sleep
- Last Kiss
- Means to an End
- Losing Ground
- Wrap My Mind Around You

The Mountain

- Yesterdays Apology

The OC

- Love Goes

October Road

- It's Not Like That
- What's Golden Above Ground

The Hills

- What's Golden Above Ground

Pretty Little Liars

- Better Off Now
- Counting Sleep
- Stay By Me
- Follow Suit
- Turn Our Eyes Away
- This Time Tomorrow
- Where Fear Runs Through
- Don't Say Anything

Private Practice

- This Time Tomorrow

So You Think You Can Dance

- Inside These Lines

Parenthood

- Odds of Being Alone

Flashpoint

- Come To Life

NCIS

- Better Off Now

Drop Dead Diva

- I'm Not OK (cover version)

The Arrow

- Vertigo

Mistresses

- I'm not OK

Sullivan's Crossing

- Follow Suit

== Music videos ==
Year	Video	Director
2010	"Inside These Lines"	Becky Fluke
2011	"Follow Suit"	Becky Fluke
