= Martina (album) =

Studio album by Martina McBride
- Released: September 30, 2003
- Studio: The Money Pit (Nashville, Tennessee); Blackbird (Nashville, Tennessee); Paragon (Nashville, Tennessee); Skaggs Place (Hendersonville, Tennessee)
- Genre: Country; country pop
- Length: 49:55
- Label: RCA Nashville
- Producer: Martina McBride; Paul Worley

Martina McBride chronology
Greatest Hits (2001)	Martina (2003)	Timeless (2005)

Singles from Martina
- 1. "This One's for the Girls" Released: June 9, 2003; 2. "In My Daughter's Eyes" Released: November 17, 2003; 3. "How Far" Released: April 19, 2004; 4. "God's Will" Released: November 26, 2004

Professional ratings
Review scores
Source	Rating
About.com	(favorable)
Allmusic	4/5 stars
Entertainment Weekly	C+
Rolling Stone	3/5 stars

Martina is the seventh studio album by American country music artist Martina McBride. It was released in September 2003 by RCA Nashville. It was a number one on the country album charts and number seven on the US album charts. The album produced four singles on the country charts: "This One's for the Girls" at number 3, "In My Daughter's Eyes" at number 4, "How Far" at number 12, and "God's Will" at number 16. "This One's for the Girls", which featured backing vocals from Faith Hill, Carolyn Dawn Johnson and McBride's two daughters, was also McBride's first and only Number One hit on the Adult Contemporary charts. The album was certified 2× Platinum by the Recording Industry Association of America.

== Content ==
The album features a live concert version of the classic song "Over the Rainbow". Track 2, "She's a Butterfly", features Big & Rich on background vocals. Ricky Skaggs plays mandolin and sings background vocals alongside his wife, Sharon White, on "Reluctant Daughter", which Skaggs also arranged. The track, "Wearing White", features Vince Gill on backup vocals. A limited edition was also released exclusively through Wal-Mart retail stores. This version featured a bonus track, "Show Me". The track can now also be found on Playlist: The Very Best of Martina McBride.

== Track listing ==
No.	Title	Writer(s)	Length
1.	"So Magical"	Brett James, Angelo Petraglia, Hillary Lindsey	3:52
2.	"She's a Butterfly"	Big Kenny, John Rich	4:00
3.	"City of Love"	Troy Lancaster, Tommy Polk	2:59
4.	"This One's for the Girls"	Chris Lindsey, H. Lindsey, Aimee Mayo	4:04
5.	"How Far"	Shaye Smith, Ed Hill, Jamie O'Neal	3:57
6.	"Reluctant Daughter"	Jon Vezner, Sally Barris	2:36
7.	"Wearing White"	Tommy Lee James, Lisa Drew	2:51
8.	"When You Love Me"	Petraglia, James, H. Lindsey	4:32
9.	"In My Daughter's Eyes"	James T. Slater	3:14
10.	"Learning to Fall"	Bill Deasy, Odie Blackmon	3:57
11.	"God's Will"	Barry Dean, Tom Douglas	5:50
12.	"Over the Rainbow" (Live)	Harold Arlen, Yip Harburg	3:34
13.	"Show Me" (Limited edition bonus track)	Troy Verges	4:29
Total length:			49:55

== Personnel ==
As listed in liner notes.

Musicians and Vocals

- Martina McBride – lead vocals, backing vocals (2, 4), harmony vocals (3, 8, 10), arrangements (12)
- John Hobbs – acoustic piano (1, 2, 8, 10, 11), Hammond B3 organ (2–5, 7)
- Tony Harrell – synthesizers (2), Wurlitzer electric piano (8)
- Jeffrey Taylor – accordion (6)
- Jim Medlin – acoustic piano (9, 12)
- B. James Lowry – acoustic guitar (1–5, 7, 8, 10, 11)
- Bryan Sutton – acoustic guitar (1, 6), mandolin (1)
- Biff Watson – acoustic guitar (2–5, 7, 8, 10, 11)
- Marty Schiff – acoustic guitar (12)
- J. T. Corenflos – electric guitar (1, 3, 4, 5, 7, 11)
- David Grissom – electric guitar (2, 8, 10)
- Dann Huff – electric guitar (3, 4, 5, 7, 8, 10, 11)
- Paul Worley – electric guitar (10)
- Greg Foresman – electric guitar (12)
- Ricky Skaggs – mandolin (6), backing vocals (6), arrangements (6)
- Paul Franklin – steel guitar (1)
- Dan Dugmore – steel guitar (2, 4, 5, 8, 10, 11), 12-string guitar (4)
- Wayne Dahl – steel guitar (12)
- Glenn Worf – bass guitar (1, 2, 8, 10)
- Jimmie Lee Sloas – bass guitar (3, 4, 5, 7, 11)
- Mark Fain – upright bass (6)
- Glenn Snow – bass guitar (12)
- David Huff – drum programming (1, 3, 4, 5, 7), percussion (1), "big" drum (2)
- Lonnie Wilson – drums (1, 3, 4, 5, 7, 11)
- Matt Chamberlain – drums (2, 8, 10)
- Greg Herrington – drums (12)
- Tom Roady – percussion (1, 2, 10)
- Jonathan Yudkin – fiddle (1), mandolin solo (1), cello (2), viola (2), violin (2)
- Stuart Duncan – fiddle (6, 7)
- John Mock – penny whistle (1)
- Hillary Lindsey – backing vocals (1, 4)
- Big Kenny – backing vocals (2)
- John Rich – backing vocals (2)
- Wes Hightower – backing vocals (3, 10)
- Faith Hill – backing vocals (4)
- Carolyn Dawn Johnson – backing vocals (4)
- Aimee Mayo – backing vocals (4)
- Delaney McBride – backing vocals (4)
- Emma McBride – backing vocals (4)
- Sharon White – backing vocals (6)
- Vince Gill – backing vocals (7)
- Bob Bailey – backing vocals (8)
- Kim Fleming – backing vocals (8)
- Vicki Hampton – backing vocals (8)
- Troy Johnson – backing vocals (10)

The Nashville String Machine (Tracks 3, 5, 9 & 11)

- Chris McDonald – arrangements and conductor (3, 5, 11)
- Don Hart – arrangements and conductor (9)
- Eberhard Ramm – music copyist
- Bob Mason, Margaret Mason, Carole Neuen-Rabinowitz and Felix Wang – cello
- Jack Jezirio and Craig Nelson – double bass
- Monisa Angell, Jim Grosjean, Gary Vanosdale and Kristin Wilkinson – viola
- David Angell, Janet Askey, David Davidson, Conni Ellisor, Carl Gorodetzky, Lee Larrison, Cate Myer, Pamela Sixfin, Chris Teal, Alan Umstead, Cathy Umstead and Karen Winkelmann – violin

== Production ==
- Martina McBride – producer
- Paul Worley – producer
- Clarke Schleicher – recording (1–5, 7, 8, 10, 11, 12), mixing (4, 6), string recording (9)
- Brent King – recording (6)
- Vance Powell – overdub engineer, vocal engineer, recording assistant (1–5, 7, 8, 10, 11, 12), recording (9)
- Erik Hellerman – recording assistant (1–5, 7, 8, 10, 11, 12)
- Lee Groitschz – recording assistant (6)
- Melissa Mattey – recording assistant (9)
- John McBride – mixing (1, 2, 3, 5, 7–12), management
- Jeremy Cottrell – mix assistant
- Adam Ayan – mastering
- Paige Conners – production coordinator
- Astrid May – art direction
- S. Wade Hunt – art direction
- Andrew Eccles – photography
- Mary Beth Felts – make-up
- Claudia Fowler – wardrobe stylist
- Earl Cox – hair stylist
- Bruce Allen – management

Studios

- Recorded at The Money Pit, Blackbird Studio and Paragon Studios (Nashville, Tennessee); Skaggs Place Studios (Hendersonville, Tennessee).
- Mixed at Blackbird Studio
- Mastered at Gateway Mastering (Portland, Maine).

== Charts ==
=== Weekly charts ===
Chart (2003)	Peak position
US Billboard 200	7
US Top Country Albums (Billboard)	1

=== Year-end charts ===
Chart (2003)	Position
US Top Country Albums (Billboard)	28
Chart (2004)	Position
US Billboard 200	68
US Top Country Albums (Billboard)	12
Chart (2005)	Position
US Billboard 200	164
US Top Country Albums (Billboard)	25

== Certifications ==
Certifications for Martina
Region	Certification	Certified units/sales
United States (RIAA)	2× Platinum	2,000,000^{^}
^{^} Shipments figures based on certification alone.
