= Barry Dean (songwriter) =

American songwriter (born 1967)

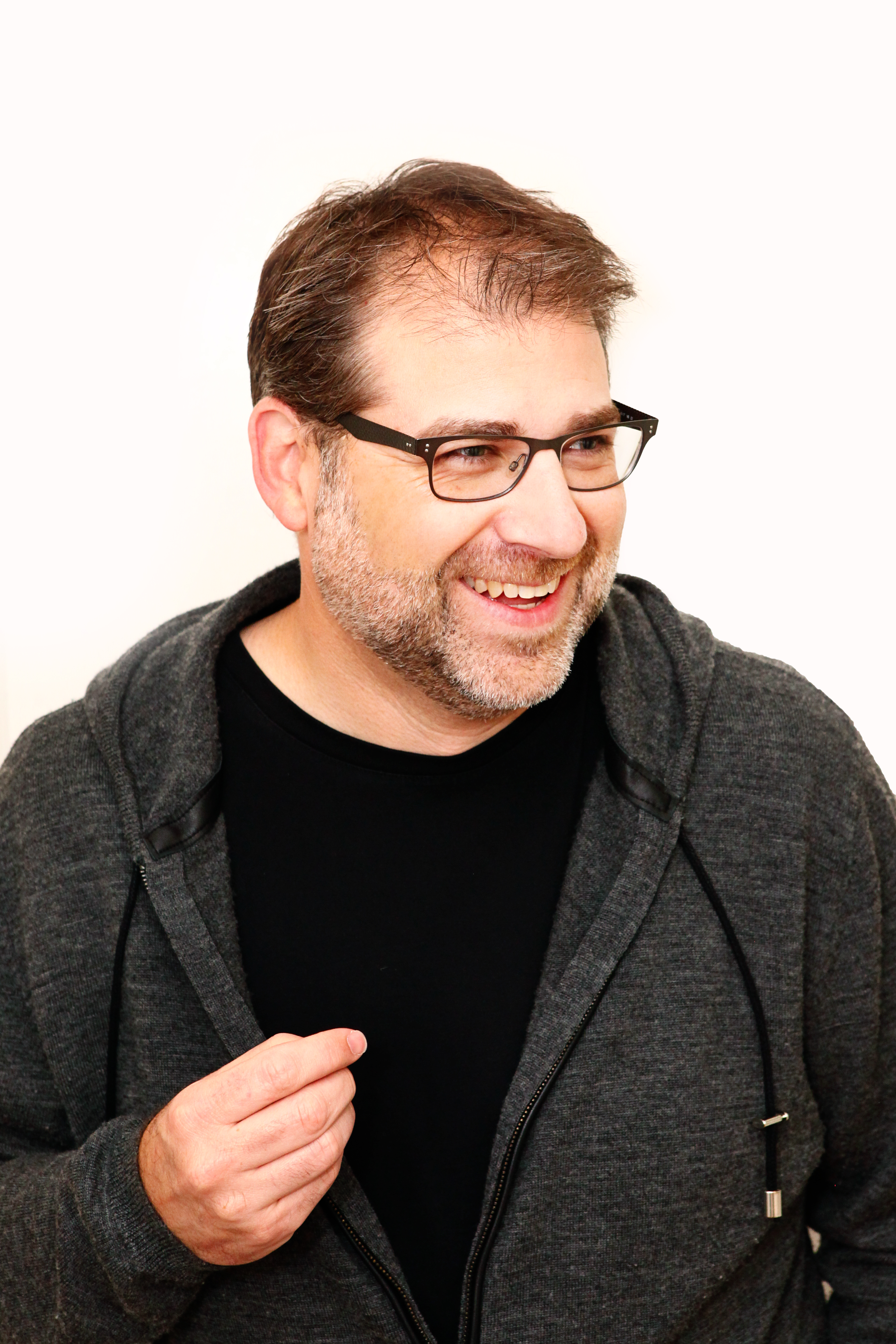

Background information
- Born: May 10, 1967 (age 59); Okmulgee, Oklahoma, U.S.
- Origin: Pittsburg, Kansas, U.S.
- Genres: Country; pop; rock
- Occupations: Singer-songwriter; record producer
- Years active: 2003-Present
- Website: creativenationmusic.com

Barry Dean (born c. 1967) is an American country and pop music songwriter based in Nashville, Tennessee. He has written multiple No. 1 singles including “Pontoon” (Little Big Town), “Day Drinking” (Little Big Town), "Somebody's Daughter" (Tenille Townes), and "Think a Little Less" (Michael Ray), along with a Top 40 hit with “Girls Chase Boys” (Ingrid Michaelson). He has been nominated for a Grammy for Best Country Song on Tim McGraw's "Diamond Rings and Old Barstools."

== Early life ==
Dean was born in Okmulgee, Oklahoma and grew up in rural Pittsburg, Kansas. He wrote songs and played in bands throughout high school and during his time at Pittsburg State University. Dean briefly pursued songwriting in Los Angeles but abandoned that in his 20s.

Dean returned to Pittsburg and worked as Creative Director for Pitsco Incorporated. He was involved in the education business for several years with a focus on marketing and media technology. In his mid-30s, Dean’s wife encouraged him to pursue songwriting again and signed him up for a cruise held by the Nashville Songwriter’s Association International for aspiring songwriters. The NSAI subsequently invited Dean to a song camp in Nashville. He considers this camp a formative experience where he learned how to write professionally and began to co-write with other Nashville writers.

== Songwriting career ==
For his first years as a songwriter Dean continued to live in Kansas and would commute into Nashville to co-write. He eventually moved to Nashville and signed with BMG in his mid-30s. His first songwriting cut was Reba McEntire playing “Moving Oleta,” a personal song Dean wrote based on his grandfather’s love for his spouse as she went through Alzheimer’s Disease. His first single, Matrina McBride’s “God’s Will,” was also personal, written in response to his daughter’s premature birth and slow recovery. Rolling Stone included “God’s Will” on its list of the “Saddest Country Songs of All Time.”

Dean has had two No. 1 hits with Little Big Town, his first with “Pontoon” and again with “Day Drinking.” “Pontoon” has been certified double platinum by the Recording Industry Association of America. Dean also reached No. 1 with “Think a Little Less” recorded by Michael Ray. Dean has co-written many hit radio singles including Jason Aldean’s “1994,” Brothers Osborne’s “Rum,” Hunter Hayes’ “Tattoo,” Toby Keith’s “Drinks After Work," Ashley Monroe's "On to Something Good," and Alison Krauss & Union Station's "My Love Follows You Where You Go." In addition to country, Dean's “Girls Chase Boys,” co-written and performed by Ingrid Michaelson, appeared on multiple radio charts, won a BMI Pop Award, and has been certified platinum by the RIAA.

In the past decade, Dean has had songs recorded by Jason Aldean, Charlotte Church, Billy Currington, Brett Eldredge, Hunter Hayes, Toby Keith, Alison Krauss, Reba McEntire, Jake Owen, Thomas Rhett, LeAnn Rimes, Carrie Underwood, Jon Pardi, Brothers Osbourne, Lori McKenna, and Maren Morris, among others.

“Pontoon,” co-written with Luke Laird and Natalie Hemby, went on to be nominated for a number of Country Music Awards. Tim McGraw’s “Diamond Rings and Barstools,” which Dean co-wrote with Luke Laird and Jonathan Singleton, was nominated for a Grammy for Best Country Song. His music has appeared in movies, such as Act of Valour, and TV shows, such as Nashville and NCIS.

Dean is primarily a co-writer, often working with songwriters Luke Laird, Lori McKenna, and Natalie Hemby. Dean left Universal Music to join Creative Nation with Beth and Luke Laird.

In appreciation for providing him a place to stay after his first child’s premature birth, Dean has been an outspoken advocate and organized a benefit for the Ronald McDonald House of the Four States.

== Songwriting discography ==
Year	Artist	Album	Song	Co-written with
2003	Martina McBride	Martina	"God's Will"	Tom Douglas
2003	Reba McEntire	Room To Breathe	"Moving Oleta"	
2006	Heartland	I Loved Her First	"Judge A Man"	Don Poythress
2006	John Corbett	John Corbett	"Judge A Man"	Don Poythress
2007	Carrie Underwood	Carnival Ride	"Crazy Dreams"	Carrie Underwood, Troy Verges
2007	Lewis, Scruggs & Long	Lifetimes	"James White"	Don Poythress, Brian White
2008	Hush	Backroads	"Hush"	Gerlach, Hartmann
2008	Chris Eaton	Dare To Dream	"Alright"	Don Poythress, Chris Eaton
2008	Phil Stacey	Phil Stacey	"No Way Around A River"	Harrington
2009	Karen Peck and New River	No Worries	"The Hour I First Believed"	Tony Wood, Don Poythress
2010	Bill Anderson	Songwriter	"One Bad Memory"	Bill Anderson, Tim Nichols
2010	Laura Bell Bundy	Achin' and Shakin'	"Boyfriend"	Luke Laird, Laura Bell Bundy
2010	Adam Brand	It's Gonna Be Ok	"Kiss You Back"	Adam Brand, Travis Meadows
2010	Don Poythress feat. Ricky Scaggs	Wash Away	" Faithful Love Of Jesus"	Don Poythress, Karyn Rochelle
2010	Clay Walker	She Won't Be Lonely Long	"People In Planes"	Luke Laird
2010	Lori McKenna	Christmas Release	"Wishlist"	Mary Steenburgen, Troy Verges, Lori McKenna
2010	Whitney Duncan	iTunes EP	"Getting Off Now"	Luke Laird, Whitney Duncan
2010	Katharine McPhee	Unbroken	"Last Letter"	Luke Laird, Katharine McPhee
2010	Katharine McPhee	Unbroken	"Anybody's Heart"	Luke Laird, Katharine McPhee
2010	Guy Penrod	Breathe Deep	"Breathe Deep"	Don Poythress, Tony Wood
2011	Neal McCoy	XII	"A-OK"	Luke Laird, Brett Eldredge
2011	Alison Krauss	Paper Airplane	"My Love Follows Where You Go"	Lori McKenna, Liz Rose
2011	Hunter Hayes	Storm Warning	"Cry With You"	Hunter Hayes
2011	Hunter Hayes	Storm Warning	"Faith To Fall Back On"	Hunter Hayes
2011	Hunter Hayes	Storm Warning	"Can't Say Love"	Hunter Hayes
2011	Sara Evans	Stronger	"Life Without Losing"	Luke Laird, Sara Evans, Andrew Dorff
2011	Lori McKenna	Lorraine	"American Revolver"	Lori McKenna
2011	Lori McKenna	Lorraine	"The Most"	Lori McKenna
2011	Lori McKenna	Lorraine	"Still Down Here"	Lori McKenna
2011	Lori McKenna	Lorraine	"Rocket Science"	Lori McKenna
2011	Meat Loaf, John Rich, Lil Jon, Mark McGrath	Feat. on Celebrity Apprentice	"Stand In The Storm"	Troy Verges
2011	Martina McBride	Eleven	"Ask The Boy"	Troy Verges
2011	Charlotte Church	Back to Scratch	"The Story Of Us"	Luke Laird, Charlotte Church
2011	Charlotte Church	Back to Scratch	"Suitcase"	Luke Laird, Charlotte Church
2011	Charlotte Church	Back to Scratch	"Unraveling"	Luke Laird, Charlotte Church
2012	Little Big Town	Tornado	Pontoon	Luke Laird, Natalie Hemby
2012	Kellie Pickler	100 Proof	"Rockaway"	Kellie Pickler, Brent Cobb
2012	Hunter Hayes	Act of Valor: The Album	"Where We Left Off"	Hunter Hayes
2012	Jay Sean, Jewel, Owl City	ConAgra Child Hunger Campaign	"Here's Hope"	Luke Laird, Hunter Hayes
2012	Montgomery Gentry	Act of Valor: The Album	"What It Takes"	Troy Verges, Andrew Dorff
2012	Neil McCoy	XII	"Judge A Man"	Donald Poythress
2012	Marlee Scott	Beautiful Maybe	"Rhinestone in the Rough"	Lesley Roy, Desmond Child
2012	Trent Dabbs	Future Like Snow	"Better Off Now"	Trent Dabbs
2012	Trent Dabbs	Future Like Snow	"Hoping For Home"	Trent Dabbs, Luke Laird, Mary Steenburgen
2012	Trent Dabbs	Future Like Snow	"Future Like Snow"	Trent Dabbs, Lori McKenna
2012	Brandon Heath	Blue Mountain	"Blue Mountain"	Luke Laird, Brandon Heath
2013	Jason Aldean	Night Train	"1994"	Luke Laird, Thomas Rhett
2013	Toby Keith	Drinks After Work	"Drinks After Work"	Luke Laird, Natalie Hemby
2013	Ronnie Dunn	I Wish I Still Smoked Cigarettes	"I Wish I Still Smoked Cigarettes"	Luke Laird, Lori McKenna
2013	Jake Owen	Days of Gold	"Tall Glass Of Something"	Luke Laird, Jaren Johnston
2013	Thomas Rhett	It Goes Like This	"Sorry For Partyin'"	Jimmy Robbins, Thomas Rhett
2013	Billy Currington	We Are Tonight	"Another Day Without You"	Andrew Dorff, Shane McAnally
2013	Brett Eldredge	Bring You Back	"Gotta Get There"	Luke Laird, Brett Eldredge
2014	Little Big Town	Pain Killer	"Day Drinking"	Troy Verges, Karen Fairchild, Jimi Westbrook, Phillip Sweet
2014	Brothers Osborne	Brothers Osborne	"Rum"	John Osborne, T. J. Osborne
2014	Hunter Hayes	Storyline	"Tattoo"	Troy Verges, Hunter Hayes
2014	Ingrid Michaelson	Lights Out	"Girls Chase Boys"	Ingrid Michaelson, Trent Dabbs
2014	Blake Shelton	Bringing Back the Sunshine	"Anyone Else"	Luke Laird, Natalie Hemby
2014	Hunter Hayes	Storyline	"Flashlight"	Troy Verges, Hunter Hayes
2014	Hunter Hayes	Storyline	"Wild Card"	Luke Laird, Hunter Hayes
2014	Steve Moakler	Wide Open	"Crooked Heart"	Steve Moakler
2014	Angaleena Presley	American Middle Class	"Surrender"	Luke Laird, Angaleena Presley
2015	Tim McGraw	Sundown Heaven Town	"Diamond Rings and Old Barstools"	Luke Laird, Jonathan Singleton
2015	Ashley Monroe	Blade	"On To Something Good"	Luke Laird, Ashley Monroe
2015	Hunter Hayes	The 21 Project	"Saint or a Sinner"	Hunter Hayes, Lori McKenna
2016	Hunter Hayes	TBA	"Yesterday's Song"	Hunter Hayes, Martin Johnson
2016	Michael Ray	Michael Ray	"Think a Little Less"	John Nite, Jimmy Robbins, Thomas Rhett
2016	Lori McKenna	The Bird & the Rifle	"Halfway Home"	Lori McKenna
2016	Lori McKenna	The Bird & the Rifle	"Old Men, Young Women"	Luke Laird, Lori McKenna
2016	LeAnn Rimes	Remnants	"How to Kiss a Boy"	LeAnn Rimes
2017	Brothers Osborne	Pawn Shop	"Dirt Rich"	John Osborne, T. J. Osborne
2017	Brothers Osborne	Pawn Shop	"Rum"	John Osborne, T. J. Osborne
2017	The Steel Wools	Straw in the Wind	"The Well"	Brent Cobb
2017	Little Big Town	The Breaker	"Free"	Natalie Hemby, Luke Laird, Lori McKenna
2017	Steve Moakler	Steel Town	"Siddle's Saloon"	Steve Moakler
2018	Devin Dawson	Dark Horse	"Dip"	Devin Dawson, Luke Laird
2018	BØRNS	Blue Madonna	"We Don't Care"	BØRNS

== Production discography ==
Year	Artist	Album	Details
2011	Lori McKenna	Lorraine	Producer
2011	Travis Meadows	Killin' Uncle Buzzy	Producer
2012	Sugar and the Hi Lows	High Roller	Producer

== Awards and nominations ==
2012

- Country Music Association Single of the Year Winner for Little Big Town's "Pontoon"

2013

- MusicRow's Breakthrough Songwriter of the Year Nominee
- CMA Song of the Year Nominee for Little Big Town’s “Pontoon”
- ACA Song of the Year Nominee for Little Big Town’s “Pontoon”
- NSAI Songs I Wish I'd Written Award for Little Big Town’s “Pontoon”

2015

- NSAI Songs I Wish I'd Written Award for Tim McGraw's "Diamond Rings And Old Barstools"
- BMI Pop Award for Ingrid Michaelson's "Girls Chase Boys"

2016

- 58th Annual Grammy Awards Best Country Song Nominee for Tim McGraw's "Diamond Rings And Old Barstools"
