= Storyline (Hunter Hayes album) =

Studio album by Hunter Hayes
- Released: May 6, 2014
- Genre: Country
- Length: 50:07
- Label: Atlantic
- Producer: Dann Huff; Hunter Hayes

Hunter Hayes chronology
Hunter Hayes (2011)	Storyline (2014)	I Want Crazy (2015)

Singles from Storyline
- 1. "Invisible" Released: January 26, 2014; 2. "Tattoo" Released: June 16, 2014

Storyline is the second studio album by American country music artist Hunter Hayes, released on May 6, 2014 through Atlantic Records. As with his previous album, every song is co-written and co-produced by Hayes. However, instead of performing all the instrumentals himself as he did on Hunter Hayes, on this release Hayes opted to feature guest musicians, including his touring band and Paul Franklin, the steel guitar player behind Vince Gill's Bakersfield.

The album was preceded on January 26 by lead single "Invisible", which peaked at #4 on the Billboard Hot Country Songs after being premiered at the 2014 Grammy Awards.

== Background ==
Hayes revealed in an interview with Billboard that he was "very conscious about" constructing his second album after the success of his debut effort, and that he planned to take his time recording. By November 2013, he had written more than 60 songs for the album, by which point he "finally" felt ready to narrow it down the songs that best represented what he wanted to say. Ultimately, the track listing ended up consisting of 14 tracks.

While Hayes intended to work with Dann Huff again and play "almost as much" as he did on his previous album, he also wanted to branch out and collaborate with other musicians. "There's a couple of songs I may even do by myself," he told Billboard in November, "But I'll bring in some collaborators, too, musician-wise. I'll bring in some guys I haven't worked with but wanted to work with."

== Critical reception ==
Professional ratings
Aggregate scores
Source	Rating
Metacritic	80/100
Review scores
Source	Rating
AllMusic	4/5 stars
Country Weekly	A
Digital Journal	4.5/5 stars
Los Angeles Times	3/4 stars
Newsday	B+
The Oakland Press	2.5/4 stars
Rolling Stone	3/5 stars
USA Today	2.5/4 stars

Storyline garnered generally positive reception from eight music critics. The review aggregator website Metacritic assigns a "weighted average" rating to an album, utilizing selected independent mainstream reviews, and the album has a Metascore of an 80 out of 100 based on four reviews. Tammy Ragusa of Country Weekly graded the album an A, observing how "Hunter Hayes has once again produced a collection of music that belies his tender age, not only in content, but in vocal confidence." At AllMusic, Stephen Thomas Erlewine rated the album four stars out of five, stating that "Hunter doesn't bother sounding older than his years nor does he care to put on airs: he's a modern-day Southern boy, raised on radio pop played in big box stores and playing the back porch on a Sunday afternoon, and those two strands come together beguilingly on this second album." Jerry Shriver of USA Today rated the album two-and-a-half stars out of four, writing that "Wide-eyed exuberance, hand-wringing and licking of surface wounds dominate his lyrics, most of them lightweight." At The Oakland Press, Gary Graff rated the album two-and-a-half stars out of four, saying that "Fortunately, he knows better than to try to solve the world’s problems and instead confines himself to matters of the heart." Glenn Gamboa of Newsday graded the album a B+, remarking how Hayes "plays that up, hanging his sophomore album on emotional, inspirational anthems and tender love songs delivered in a sweeter, higher register that makes all his songs sound distinctive", which "It's a risk, but the best new artist Grammy nominee seems poised to make it pay off." At Los Angeles Times, Mikael Wood rated the album three out of four stars, stating that "the album's slickly assured arrangements, those jitters provide a juicy tension" on a release that shows "What's important is that this insider convinces you he's coming from outside." Markos Papadatos of Digital Journal rated the album four-and-a-half stars out of five, writing that "it is a great CD of relationship storytelling, and his message is inspirational and positive throughout." At Rolling Stone, Nick Murray rated the album three stars out of five, observing how the release comes "with clean arrangements and twangless vocals that could carry the singer-songwriter beyond country radio altogether."

== Commercial performance ==
The album debuted on its release at No. 3 on the Billboard 200 and No. 1 on the Top Country Albums chart with 69,000 copies sold in the US. The album has sold 190,000 copies in the US as of September 2015.

== Track listing ==
Titles and writing credits derived from Hunter Hayes' official site.

No.	Title	Writer(s)	Length
1.	"Wild Card"	Hunter Hayes; Luke Laird; Barry Dean	3:14
2.	"Storyline"	Hayes; Troy Verges; Eric Paslay	3:27
3.	"Still Fallin"	Hayes; Melissa Peirce	3:43
4.	"Tattoo"	Hayes; Verges; Dean	3:17
5.	"Invisible"	Hayes; Bonnie Baker; Katrina Elam	4:32
6.	"...interlude"	Hayes; Elam; Baker; Dean; Paul Buckmaster	0:53
7.	"You Think You Know Somebody"	Hayes; Sam Ellis	4:27
8.	"Flashlight"	Hayes; Verges; Dean	4:47
9.	"When Did You Stop Loving Me"	Hayes; Ellis	4:28
10.	"...like I was saying (jam)"	Hayes; Ellis	1:42
11.	"Secret Love"	Hayes; Ellis	3:38
12.	"Nothing Like Starting Over"	Hayes; Verges; Gordie Sampson	3:53
13.	"If It's Just Me"	Hayes; Baker; Elam	3:42
14.	"Love Too Much"	Hayes; Ellis	4:19
Total length:			50:07

Japan Bonus Tracks (Live at Bridgestone)
No.	Title	Writer(s)	Length
15.	"Invisible (Rehearsal Session)"	Hayes; Baker; Elam	4:36
16.	"Wild Card (Rehearsal Session)"	Hayes; Laird; Dean	3:15

Google Play Bonus Track
No.	Title	Writer(s)	Length
15.	"Tattoo (Live at Bridgestone)"	Hayes; Verges; Dean	3:16
Total length:			53:23

== Personnel ==
- John Acosta – cello
- Belinda Broughton – violin
- Paul Buckmaster – string arrangements, conductor
- Justin Davis – background vocals
- Sam Ellis – acoustic guitar, mandolin, synthesizer, ukulele, background vocals
- Paul Franklin – steel guitar
- Clayton Haslop – violin
- Hunter Hayes – accordion, bouzouki, acoustic guitar, baritone guitar, electric guitar, resonator guitar, Hammond B-3 organ, mandocello, mandolin, percussion, piano, synthesizer, ukulele, lead vocals, background vocals, Wurlitzer
- Juan-Miguel Hernandez – viola
- Gerardo Hilera – violin
- Charlie Judge – synthesizer
- Peter Kent – violin
- Songa Lee – violin
- Mario de León – violin
- Jeanie Lim – viola
- Dane Little – cello
- Devin Malone – acoustic guitar, electric guitar, percussion
- Robert Matsuda – violin
- Jonathan Moerschel – viola
- Robin Olson – violin
- Michele Richards – violin
- Steve Richards – cello
- Mark Robertson – violin
- Neil Samples – violin
- Andy Sheridan – piano
- Steve Sinatra – drums, percussion
- Rudolph Stein – cello
- Matt Utterback – bass guitar, percussion
- Evan Wilson – viola
- John Wittenberg – violin
- Nir Z – drums, percussion
- Sarah Zimmerman – background vocals

== Charts ==
=== Weekly charts ===
Chart (2014)	Peak position
Canadian Albums (Billboard)	2
Japanese Albums (Oricon)	38
US Billboard 200	3
US Top Country Albums (Billboard)	1

=== Year-end charts ===
Chart (2014)	Position
US Billboard 200	126
US Top Country Albums (Billboard)	23

=== Singles ===
Year	Single	Peak chart positions				
Year	Single	US Country	US Country Airplay	US	CAN Country	CAN
2014	"Invisible"	4	19	44	30	26
2014	"Tattoo"	31	24	125	49	—
