= Liza Anne =

American musician

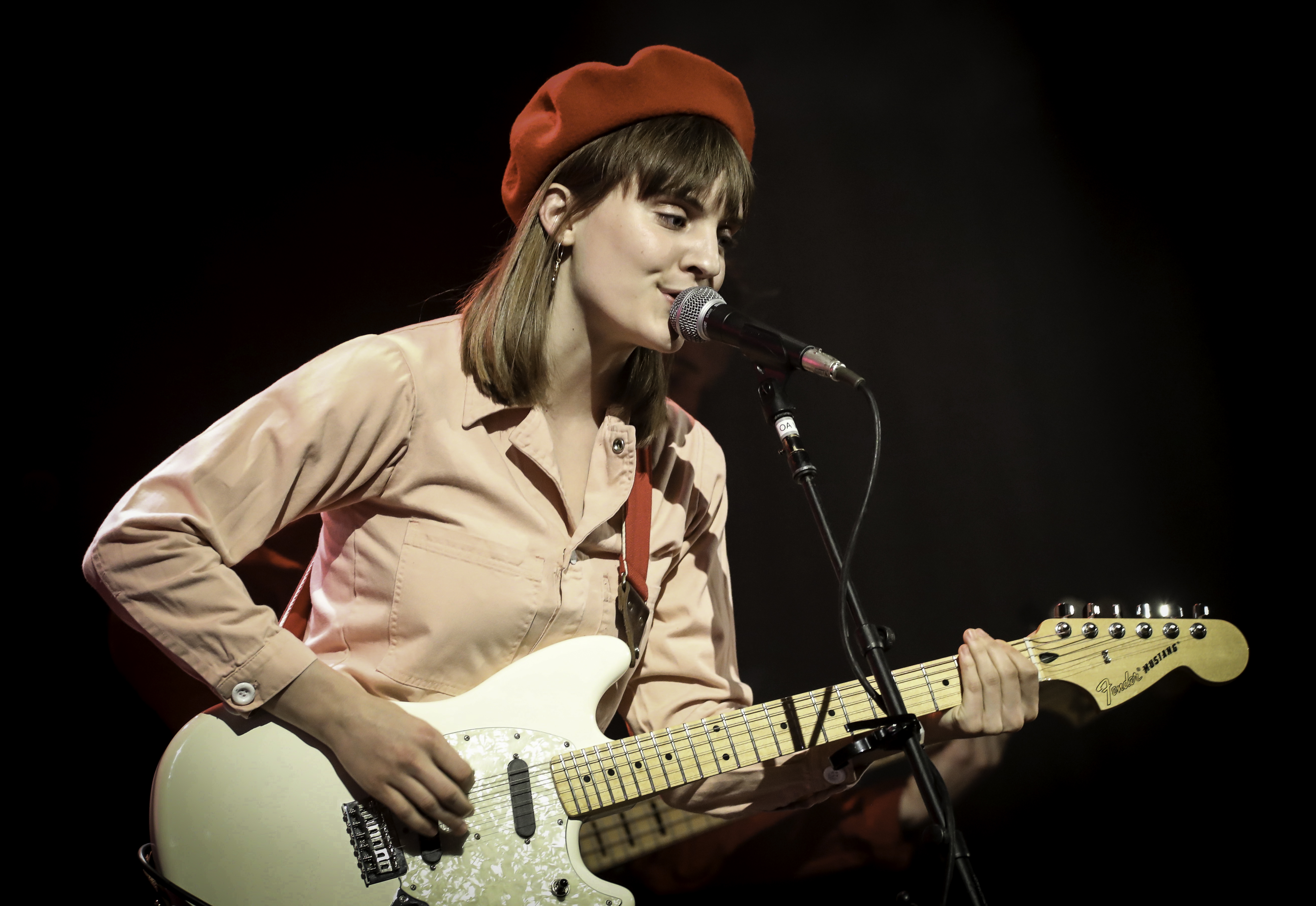
- Anne performing in 2019

Background information
- Born: Elizabeth Anne Odachowski
- Origin: Saint Simons Island, Georgia, U.S.
- Genres: Rock, singer-songwriter
- Years active: 2010–present
- Label: Arts & Crafts
- Members: Liza Odachowski (guitar/vocals); Robbie Jackson (guitar); Cody Carpenter (drums); Josh Gilligan (bass)
- Website: lizaannemusic.com

Liza Anne (born Elizabeth Anne Odachowski) is an American rock musician born in Saint Simons Island, Georgia.

== Career ==
Liza Anne began their career in 2010. In 2014, they released their debut full-length album titled The Colder Months. In May 2015, Liza Anne released their second full-length album titled Two. Liza Anne's third studio album, Fine but Dying, was released on March 9, 2018. Liza Anne supported Kacey Musgraves as an opening act for select dates in February and March 2019. Their fourth full-length album, Bad Vacation, was released in 2020.

== Discography ==
Studio albums

- The Colder Months (2014)
- Two (2015)
- Fine but Dying (2018)
- Bad Vacation (2020)
- Utopian (2023)

== Personal life ==
Anne is gay and nonbinary. As of 2025, they live in Paris, France.
