= Heartland International Tattoo =

International tattoo

The Heartland International Tattoo presented at the Sears Centre Arena in Hoffman Estates, Illinois is an exhibition of military and civilian marching bands, bagpipe bands, brass bands, Highland dancers, Irish dancers and more.

== History ==
Created in 2006, the Heartland International Tattoo pays tribute to various United States Military. In 2006, the tribute was to the USS Arizona that was lost at Pearl Harbor. 2007 marked the Second Annual Heartland International Tattoo by paying tribute to the Military and Music of the Civil War. Civil War reenactors took an active part in the Tattoo performance. The 2008 Heartland International Tattoo was canceled due to poor ticket sales, but the event returns in 2009 at the Sears Centre Arena in Hoffman Estates, Illinois. The 2009 theme was a tribute to the Men and Women of the United States and Canadian Air Command units.

== Previous Performers ==
Performers from the 2008 Heartland International Tattoo include:

- Prairie Brass Band - Arlington Heights, IL
- Chicago Pipe Band – Chicago, IL
- 1st Battalion Chicago Highland Rifles – Chicago, IL
- Thistle & Heather Highland Dancers – Chicago, IL
- McNulty School of Irish Dance – Chicago, IL
- Boliviamanta Dance Ensemble – Chicago, IL
- U.S. Navy Band – Great Lakes, IL
- Columbia College Jazz Ensemble – Chicago, IL
- The Tebala Thunderbirds Air Squadron – Rockford, IL
- History of the American Flag Tribute – Chicago, IL
- Royal Airs Drum & Bugle Corps – Chicago, IL
- Bugle Across America – Chicago, IL
- NIU ROTC Honor Guard – DeKalb, IL
- Sycamore HS Color Guard – Sycamore, IL

Performers from the 2006 Heartland International Tattoo include:

- The United States Marine Drum and Bugle Corps, Washington D.C.
- United States Navy Band, Great Lakes, IL
- United States Coast Guard Academy Silent Drill Team
- Prairie Brass Band, Arlington Heights, IL
- 8 Wing Canadian Trenton Pipe Band, Canada
- Chicago Highlanders Pipe Band, Chicago, IL
- Saint Andrews Bagpipe Band, Central Illinois
- Thistle & Heather Highland Dancers, Chicago, IL
- McNulty Irish Dancers, Chicago, IL
- 1st Battalion Chicago Highland Rifles, Chicago, IL
- The Marine Living Memorial Honor Guard, WI
- NIU ROTC Color Guard
- Steel Drum Band, Northern Illinois University, DeKalb, IL
- Epsilon Rho chapter of Phi Mu Alpha Sinfonia, NIU DeKalb, IL
