= Tattoo (Hunter Hayes song) =

Single by Hunter Hayes

from the album Storyline and I Want Crazy
- Released: June 16, 2014
- Genre: Country pop; pop rock
- Length: 3:17
- Label: Atlantic
- Songwriters: Hunter Hayes; Troy Verges; Barry Dean
- Producers: Hunter Hayes; Dann Huff

Hunter Hayes singles chronology
"Invisible" (2014)	"Tattoo" (2014)	"Light Me Up" (2015)

"Tattoo" is a song recorded by American country music artist Hunter Hayes as the second single from his second studio album Storyline (2014). Hayes co-wrote the song in a collaboration with Troy Verges and Barry Dean, while the production was handled by Hayes and Dann Huff. It was released to country radio through Atlantic Records on June 16, 2014 as the second single off the album. "Tattoo" was released as an extended play in the UK as Hayes' international musical debut on October 3, 2014, and was re-released as the second single from his international debut album, I Want Crazy (2015), on March 23, 2015.

== Live performances ==
Hayes debuted the song at the 2014 CMT Music Awards on June 4, 2014.

== Music video ==
The music video was directed by Kristin Barlowe and premiered on July 28, 2014.

== Track listing ==
- Digital download
1. "Tattoo" – 3:17
- UK digital EP
1. "Tattoo" (UK version) – 3:21
2. "Invisible" (Acoustic) – 4:36
3. "Counting Stars" (Live) – 5:00

== Chart performance ==
"Tattoo" debuted at No. 55 on the Billboard Country Airplay chart for the week ending June 14, 2014 on unsolicited airplay prior to its official release.

Chart (2014)	Peak position
Canada Country (Billboard)	49
US Bubbling Under Hot 100 (Billboard)	25
US Country Airplay (Billboard)	24
US Hot Country Songs (Billboard)	31

=== Year-end charts ===
Chart (2014)	Position
US Country Airplay (Billboard)	82
US Hot Country Songs (Billboard)	91

== Release history ==
Country	Date	Format	Label	Ref.
United States	June 16, 2014	Country radio	Atlantic Records	
United Kingdom	October 3, 2014	Digital download (EP)	WEA International Inc.	
United Kingdom	March 23, 2015	Digital download (single)	WEA International Inc.	
