= Invisible (Hunter Hayes song) =

Single by Hunter Hayes

from the album Storyline
- Released: January 26, 2014
- Genre: Country pop
- Length: 4:32
- Label: Atlantic
- Songwriters: Hunter Hayes; Bonnie Baker; Katrina Elam
- Producers: Hunter Hayes; Dann Huff

Hunter Hayes singles chronology
"Everybody's Got Somebody but Me" (2013)	"Invisible" (2014)	"Tattoo" (2014)

"Invisible" is a song recorded by American country music artist Hunter Hayes. It was the lead single from his second studio album Storyline (2014). Hayes co-wrote the song in a collaboration with Bonnie Baker and Katrina Elam, while the production was handled by Hayes and Dann Huff. The song was debuted at the 2014 Grammy Awards on January 26, 2014, and was released to digital retailers the same day.

== Background ==
Hayes wrote this song about the bullying that he experienced while growing up. In an interview with Entertainment Tonight, Hayes said, "To me it's also just about being misunderstood. Just me being in high school, just the smallest scale I know compared to a lot of stories that I've heard, a lot of people that I've met ... yes, I was a total geek, I was a total nerd, and you know, I still am, and I'm proud of that. But it took me a while to realize that it's OK to be proud of that, right? Because in that time and period of my life, if you didn't fit in, what else was there? Fortunately for me I had incredible parents, I had an incredible support system, musicians around me, and that showed me that there was hope -- that there was maybe something else I could look forward to."

== Music video ==
The music video was directed by Ray Kay and premiered on March 13, 2014.

== Critical reception ==
The song received generally positive reviews. Billy Dukes of Taste of Country called the song a "complex and satisfying expression" of vulnerability, and praised Hayes for choosing a song with a personal message for his big Grammy moment. Markos Papadatos of Digital Journal was complimentary of both the "emotional, powerful and inspirational" lyrics as well as Hayes' conviction, noting that the song indicates growth and maturity over Hayes' debut.

Brian Braiker of The Guardian was less favorable, saying that "the song is anodyne, safe and bland. It’ll do fine." Grady Smith of Entertainment Weekly was also unfavorable, giving the song a "C+" and saying that "His anti-bullying ballad is overbearing, preachy, and perhaps worst of all, boring. If you're gonna write popular music's 457th song about self-esteem, at least don't make it pander to every last cliché."

== Live performances ==
Hayes performed the song live at the 56th Annual Grammy Awards. Entertainment Weekly also graded this performance "C+", with Nick Catucci writing that Hayes "provided the first down moment of the night with a saccharine new song" and that his performance was "most notable for the inspirational quotes from the likes of John Lennon and, uh, Steve Jobs, Lady Gaga, and Johnny Depp projected behind him".

== Track listing ==
Digital download

1. "Invisible" – 4:32

CD single

1. "Invisible" – 4:32
2. "Invisible (Instrumental)" - 4:32

== Chart performance ==
"Invisible" sold 35,000 downloads in the few hours after its premiered on the Grammy, and on the strength on the few hours of sales, the song debuted on the Hot Country Songs at No. 23, and Country Digital Songs charts at No. 7. This represents Hunter Hayes' highest ever debut thus far. It also debuted on the Billboard Hot 100 at No. 88. In the following week it reached No. 1 on the Country Digital Songs chart with 92,000 copies sold for the week, and reaching No. 4 on Hot Country Songs and No. 44 on Billboard Hot 100.

The song has sold 419,000 copies in the U.S. as of June 2014.

== Awards and nominations ==
Year	Awards	Category	Result
2015	57th Grammy Awards	Best Country Solo Performance	Nominated

== Charts and certifications ==
=== Weekly charts ===
Chart (2014)	Peak position
Canada Hot 100 (Billboard)	26
Canada Country (Billboard)	30
Japan Hot 100 (Billboard)	17
US Billboard Hot 100	44
US Country Airplay (Billboard)	19
US Hot Country Songs (Billboard)	4

=== Year-end charts ===
Chart (2014)	Position
US Country Airplay (Billboard)	75
US Hot Country Songs (Billboard)	51

=== Certifications ===
Region	Certification	Certified units/sales
United States (RIAA)	Gold	500,000^{‡}
^{‡} Sales+streaming figures based on certification alone.

== Release history ==
Country	Date	Format	Label
Canada	January 26, 2014	Digital download	Atlantic
United States	January 26, 2014	Digital download	Atlantic
