= Storyman (band) =

- Origin: Ireland
- Genres: Pop; indie rock
- Years active: 2013–present
- Members: Kevin May; Mick Lynch

Storyman is the songwriting partnership of Kevin May and Mick Lynch. Both hail from Ireland and first achieved success as members of the band The Guggenheim Grotto. After raising funds for a new album through PledgeMusic, the duo worked with producer Chris Kuffner on new material. The resulting album was different enough from their previous work as The Guggenheim Grotto that they decided to change their name to reflect the new project. They released their first album as Storyman, entitled This Time Round, on November 12, 2013.

== Biography ==
As part of The Guggenheim Grotto, Kevin and Mick broke through with their 2006 debut Waltzing Alone. Two more critically acclaimed albums followed, 2008’s Happy The Man and 2010’s The Universe Is Laughing.

The stylistic difference of Storyman is a reflection of Kevin and Mick's time living in Brooklyn for three years and feeling inspiration from the musical landscape of the city. This Time Round features New York based musicians Chris Kuffner (electric guitars, bass, synths), Elliott Jacobson (drums/percussion), and Katie Costello, Lelia Broussard and Hannah Winkler (vocals). The album shows their singer-songwriter roots with an expanded sonic and lyrical palette. This Time Round was featured as one of Brave New World’s Best Albums of 2013, and the duo also won The Deli’s year end New York City songwriter poll.

In support of the album, Storyman joined Ingrid Michaelson on her Lights Out Tour in 2014. having toured with her once before as The Guggenheim Grotto. Michaelson included a cover of Storyman's “You Got Me” on the album, which she performed with May and Lynch.

== Discography ==
- This Time Round (2013) - United for Opportunity
