= St. Alexius Medical Center (Illinois) =

American Catholic hospital

- AMITA Health

Geography
- Location: Hoffman Estates, Illinois, United States
- Coordinates: 42°3′11″N 88°8′28″W

Organization
- Care system: Private
- Type: General
- Religious affiliation: Catholic church

Services
- Emergency department: Level II trauma center
- Beds: 318

Links
- Website: official website
- Lists: Hospitals in Illinois

St. Alexius Medical Center is a faith-based community hospital located in Hoffman Estates, Illinois, a northwest suburb of Chicago.

== History ==
St. Alexius Medical Center has a level II trauma center and employs more than 950 physicians, representing 60 medical and surgical specialties and more than 1800 employees assisting the medical/dental staff to deliver patient care. The hospital was founded by the Alexian Brothers, a Roman Catholic order.

In October 2021, AMITA Health announced it would be splitting up. Under the separation, AdventHealth and Ascension would manage their respective facilities. Ascension maintains control over the five hospitals and outpatient facilities in the Alexian Brothers Health System.

== Covid-19 ==
During the COVID-19 pandemic, St. Alexius made news in January 2020 after the hospital treated two of the first COVID-19 cases in the United States, including the first known community transmission case within the United States.
