= T2A =

T2A may refer to:

- T2A peptide, a 2A self-cleaving peptides.
- Ultima Online: The Second Age, an Ultima Online expansion commonly abbreviated as T2A.
- A temperature classification in electrical equipment in hazardous areas.
