= Hoffman Estates, Illinois =

- Village
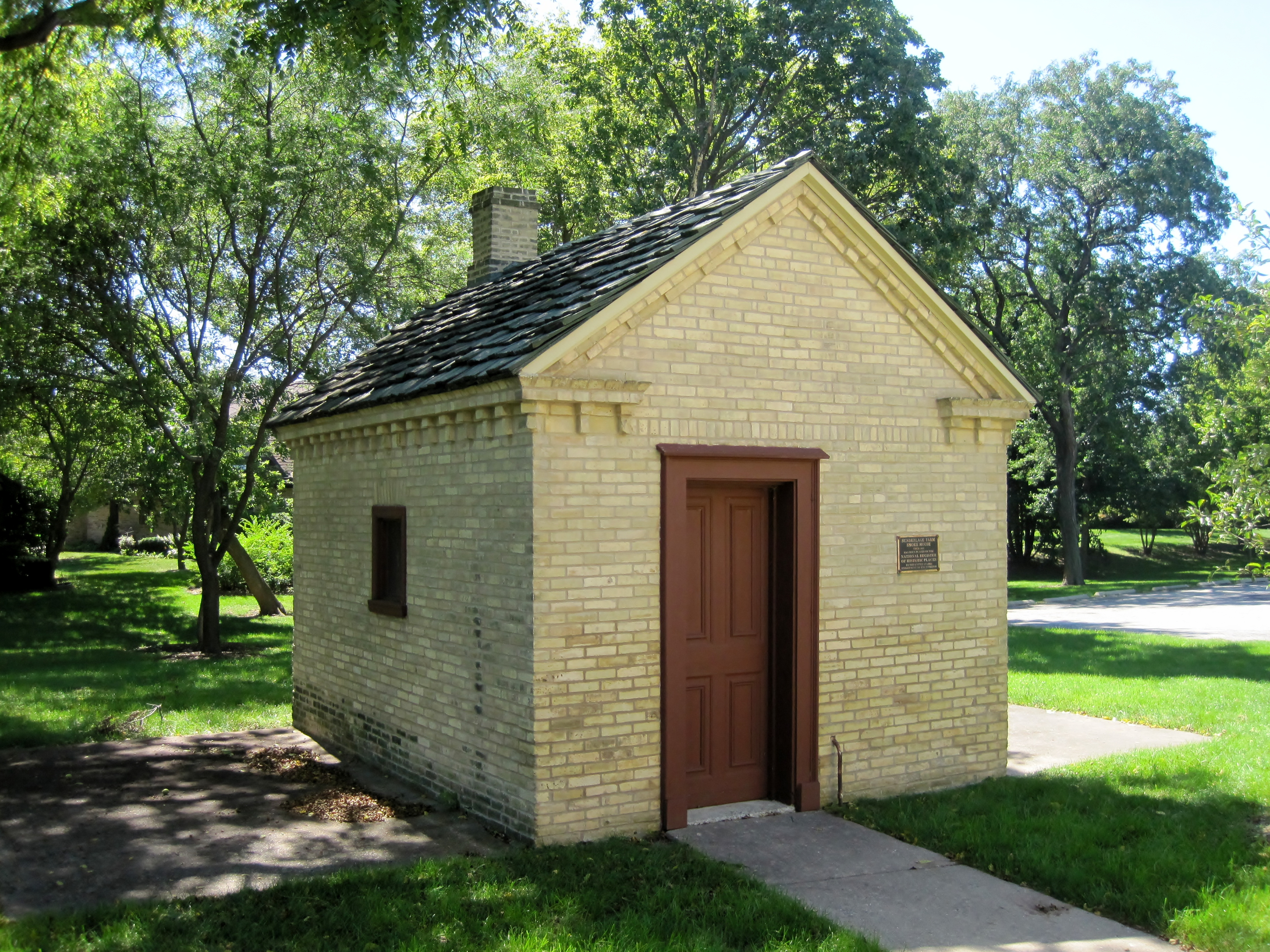
- Sunderlage Farm Smokehouse

- Flag Seal
- Motto: "Growing to Greatness"
- Location of Hoffman Estates in Cook County, Illinois

- Location within Chicago metropolitan area Location within Illinois Location within the United States
- Coordinates: 42°03′50″N 88°08′49″W
- Country: United States
- State: Illinois
- Counties: Cook
- Townships: Schaumburg, Palatine, Hanover, Barrington
- Incorporated: 1959 (village)

Government
  - Mayor: William D. McLeod
  - Village Manager: Eric J. Palm

Area
  - Total: 21.25 sq mi (55.03 km^{2})
  - Land: 21.07 sq mi (54.56 km^{2})
  - Water: 0.18 sq mi (0.47 km^{2}) 0.86%
- Elevation: 824 ft (251 m)

Population (2020)
  - Total: 52,530
  - Density: 2,493.7/sq mi (962.82/km^{2})
- ZIP codes: 60169, 60010, 60192
- Area codes: 847 / 224
- FIPS code: 17-35411
- GNIS feature ID: 2398519
- Website: www.hoffmanestates.org

Hoffman Estates is a village mostly in Cook County, Illinois, United States with a very small portion in Kane County, Illinois. It is a suburb of Chicago. Per the 2020 census, the population was 52,530.

The village previously served as the headquarters for Sears and is one of the American headquarters for Mori Seiki. Now Arena, home of the Windy City Bulls of the NBA G League, is located in the village. Between 2006 and 2009, the village hosted the Heartland International Tattoo, one of the largest music and dance festivals of its kind in the Midwest.

== History ==
Prior to the 1940s, German settlers moved into the area west of Roselle Road and north of Golf Road, then known as Wildcat Grove. The area was sparsely populated until farmers purchased land in the area in the 1940s.

In 1954, Sam and Jack Hoffman, owners of a father-son owned construction company, bought 160 acres of land in the area. The pair constructed homes and began the development of the region which now bears their name. As residents moved in, they voted to incorporate the area, and the Village of Hoffman Estates was incorporated on September 23, 1959. In 1973, six former town officials, including mayors Edward F. Pinger (1959−1965) and Roy L. Jenkins (1965−1969) were indicted on bribery and tax charges.

Once the Northwest Tollway opened, Schaumburg Township became more attractive to Chicago commuters. In the early 1960s, land annexations north of the tollway and in other neighboring regions more than doubled Hoffman Estates' land area.

The opening of the Woodfield Mall in Schaumburg to the east in 1971 made the area a major business center. An attempt to change the name of the village to East Barrington, among other names, was made in the early 1980s but failed upon a residential vote.

In the 1990s, the Prairie Stone Business Park began development. This 750-acre (3.0 km^{2}) planned multi-purpose business park is bounded by Illinois Route 59 on the east, Interstate 90 on the south, Illinois Route 72 on the north, and Beverly Road on the west. The business park came to fruition in 1993 when Sears, Roebuck and Company relocated from the Sears Tower in Chicago to a sprawling headquarters in the northwest part of Prairie Stone. That was followed in by Indramat and Quest International, which in 1995 also opened facilities in the park. Throughout the 1990s, a health and wellness center and child care facility were developed, as well as other smaller office buildings, and a branch of Northern Illinois University. Development of the business park is still ongoing, and recent additions in the 2000s include the 11,000-seat Now Arena; office buildings for Serta, WT Engineering, I-CAR, and Mary Kay; a Cabela's outdoor outfitters store; a 295-room Marriott hotel; and the 400,000-square-foot (37,000 m^{2}) Poplar Creek Crossing Retail Center, which is anchored by Target and numerous other big-box retailers. Future development will include further office buildings and retail development, Sun Island Hotel and Water Park, an amphitheater, and restaurants.

In 2011, the Village of Hoffman Estates took over ownership of the Now Arena. On June 23, 2020, the Village of Hoffman Estates approved an $11.5 million deal to rename the Sears Centre Arena to the "NOW Arena".

In the fall of 2016, papers and artifacts from President Barack Obama's administration began to arrive in town, where they are being stored in a building on Golf Road. The site is their temporary home while construction takes place on the Barack Obama Presidential Center in Jackson Park, Chicago, and is not open to the public.

In January 2020, the St. Alexius Medical Center hosted both the second and sixth recorded U.S. cases of COVID-19. The sixth patient had contracted the virus from the second patient, marking the first recorded human-to-human transmission of the SARS-CoV-2 virus in the entire United States.

== Geography ==
According to the 2021 census gazetteer files, Hoffman Estates has a total area of 21.25 square miles (55.04 km^{2}), of which 21.07 square miles (54.57 km^{2}) (or 99.15%) is land and 0.18 square miles (0.47 km^{2}) (or 0.85%) is water.

== Demographics ==
Historical population
Census	Pop.	Note	%±
1960	8,296		—
1970	22,238		168.1%
1980	37,272		67.6%
1990	46,363		24.4%
2000	49,495		6.8%
2010	51,895		4.8%
2020	52,530		1.2%
U.S. Decennial Census; 2010 2020

=== Racial and ethnic composition ===
Hoffman Estates village, Illinois – Racial and ethnic composition Note: the US Census treats Hispanic/Latino as an ethnic category. This table excludes Latinos from the racial categories and assigns them to a separate category. Hispanics/Latinos may be of any race.
Race / Ethnicity (NH = Non-Hispanic)	Pop 2000	Pop 2010	Pop 2020	% 2000	% 2010	% 2020
White alone (NH)	33,789	29,357	26,014	68.27%	56.57%	49.52%
Black or African American alone (NH)	2,141	2,393	2,472	4.33%	4.61%	4.71%
Native American or Alaska Native alone (NH)	54	60	69	0.11%	0.12%	0.13%
Asian alone (NH)	7,429	11,701	13,733	15.01%	22.55%	26.14%
Pacific Islander alone (NH)	10	4	2	0.02%	0.01%	0.00%
Other race alone (NH)	73	70	183	0.15%	0.13%	0.35%
Mixed race or Multiracial (NH)	801	1,013	1,579	1.62%	1.95%	3.01%
Hispanic or Latino (any race)	5,198	7,297	8,478	10.50%	14.06%	16.14%
Total	49,495	51,895	52,530	100.00%	100.00%	100.00%

=== 2020 census ===
As of the 2020 census, Hoffman Estates had a population of 52,530. The median age was 39.3 years. 22.5% of residents were under the age of 18 and 14.8% were 65 years of age or older. For every 100 females there were 96.7 males, and for every 100 females age 18 and over there were 95.5 males age 18 and over.

100.0% of residents lived in urban areas, while 0.0% lived in rural areas.

There were 18,494 households in Hoffman Estates and 14,048 families residing in the village. Of all households, 36.3% had children under the age of 18 living in them. 60.5% were married-couple households, 13.7% had a male householder with no spouse or partner present, and 20.9% had a female householder with no spouse or partner present. About 18.9% of all households were made up of individuals and 7.5% had someone living alone who was 65 years of age or older. The average household size was 3.16 and the average family size was 2.77.

There were 19,160 housing units, of which 3.5% were vacant. The homeowner vacancy rate was 0.9% and the rental vacancy rate was 6.1%. The population density was 2,472.58 inhabitants per square mile (954.67/km^{2}) and housing units averaged 901.86 per square mile (348.21/km^{2}).

=== Income and poverty ===
The median income for a household in the village was $92,423, and the median income for a family was $103,641. Males had a median income of $56,210 versus $42,288 for females. The per capita income for the village was $40,016. About 3.3% of families and 4.3% of the population were below the poverty line, including 4.9% of those under age 18 and 3.5% of those age 65 or over.

== Economy ==
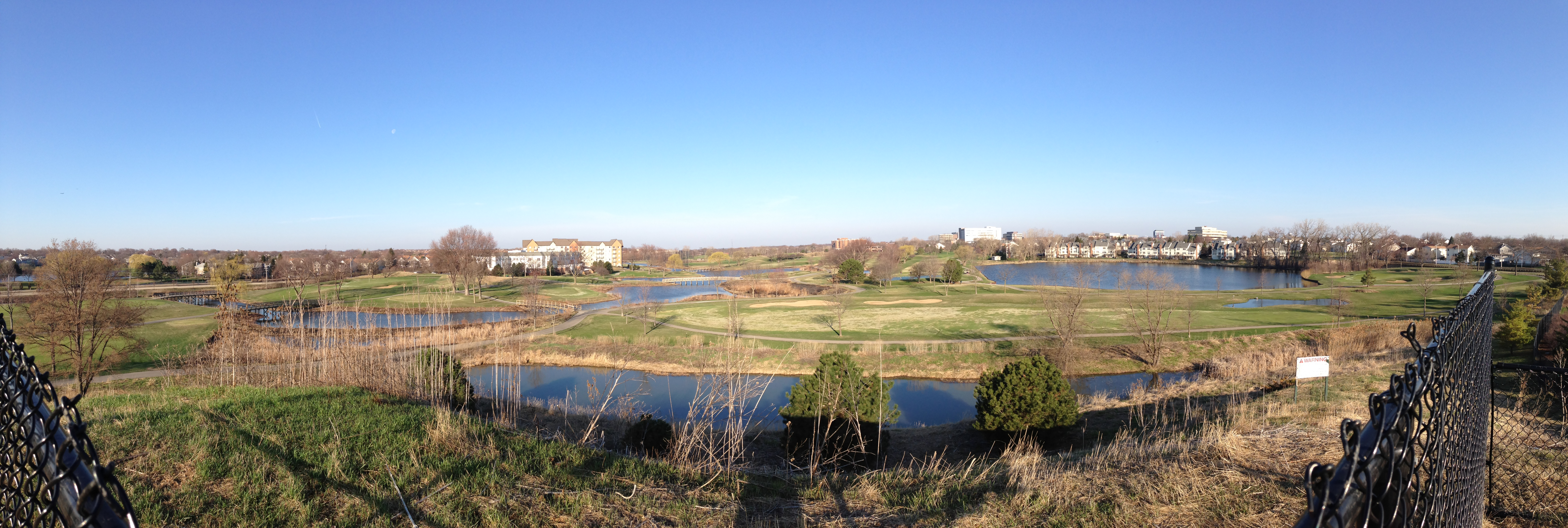
Hoffman Estates scenery

Many Japanese companies have their U.S. headquarters in Hoffman Estates and Schaumburg but the largest employers in Hoffman Estates as of 2023 are:

No.	Employer	No. of employees
1	St. Alexius Medical Center	2,500
2	Siemens Medical Systems	400
3	Claire's	400
4	Village of Hoffman Estates	370
5	FANUC America	350
6	Vistex	350
7	Leopardo Companies, Inc.	300
8	Wells Fargo	300
9	The Salvation Army	270
10	Tate & Lyle	220

== Education ==
The village is served by several public school districts. The majority of residents who live in Schaumburg Township attend:

- Township High School District 211 (9–12)
- Community Consolidated School District 54 (K–8)

North Hoffman Estates (north of I-90) residents are served by:

- Township High School District 211
- Community Consolidated School District 15 (K–8) (East of Huntington Blvd)
- Barrington School District 220 (K–12) (Unit District) (West of Huntington Blvd).

Residents west of Barrington Road primarily attend Unit School District, Elgin Area U46.

Schools located in the Hoffman Estates village limits:

- Hoffman Estates High School
- James B. Conant High School

Other high schools in the same township high school district:

- Schaumburg High School
- William Fremd High School
- Palatine High School

The Xilin Northwest Chinese School (simplified Chinese: 希林西北中文学校; traditional Chinese: 希林西北中文學校; pinyin: Xīlín Xīběi Zhōngwén Xuéxiào) holds its classes at Conant High School in Hoffman Estates. It serves grades preschool through 12. The school predominately serves mainland Chinese families. In 2003 the school held its classes in Palatine High School in Palatine. In 2000 the school had served around 300 students. This figure increased almost by 100%, to almost 600 students. This made it one of the largest of the Chinese schools in the Chicago area.

Most of the village is served by Harper College Community College District 512.

=== Libraries ===
- Barrington Area Library
- Schaumburg Township District Library
- Gail Borden Public Library District
- Palatine Township Library

== Transportation ==
Pace provides bus service on multiple routes connecting Hoffman Estates to Elgin, Rosemont, and other destinations.

== Notable people ==
- Tammy Duckworth, U.S. Senator from Illinois (2016–present)
- Rob Valentino (b. 1985), former soccer player who is an assistant coach for Atlanta United+
- William Beckett, lead singer of the band The Academy Is...
- Steven Kazmierczak, perpetrator of the 2008 Northern Illinois University shooting; born in Hoffman Estates.
- Sherri Shepherd – actress, comedian, former co-host of The View (2007–2014), host of Sherri (2022–2026)

== Sister city ==
Hoffman Estates has one sister city:

- Angoulême, Charente, Nouvelle-Aquitaine, France
