= Luca (soundtrack) =

Luca (Original Motion Picture Soundtrack)

Film score by Dan Romer
- Released: June 18, 2021
- Recorded: 2020–2021
- Studio: Newman Scoring Stage
- Genre: Film score
- Length: 64:28
- Label: Walt Disney
- Producer: Dan Romer

Dan Romer chronology
Wendy (2020)	Luca (2021)	Dear Evan Hansen (2021)

Luca (Original Motion Picture Soundtrack) is the soundtrack album to Disney/Pixar's 2021 film of the same name, produced by Pixar Animation Studios and distributed by Walt Disney Studios Motion Pictures. The album, featuring original score composed by Dan Romer, was released on the Walt Disney Records label on June 18, 2021, coinciding the same day as the film's streaming release on Disney+. The film further includes Italian songs by Mina, Edoardo Bennato, Gianni Morandi, Rita Pavone and Quartetto Cetra, and excerpts from operas by Giacomo Puccini and Gioachino Rossini.

== Development ==
On April 1, 2021, Dan Romer was revealed to be the film's composer. Casarosa told in an interview to Variety, speaking that, he wanted a composer to score for "something off the beaten path, a little bit independent". When he listened to Romer's scores for Beasts of the Southern Wild (2012) and Wendy (2020), he roped in for the film as "there was something about his scores that said 'kids on an adventure ride" which had fit the theme for Luca. Casarosa gave Romer a playlist consisting of Italian music and folk-pop from the 1950 and 1960s. Romer had said that "There's no doubt those songs influenced my writing. When I score a film that invokes the music of another culture, I like to dig in very deep and live and breathe that music so that it becomes second nature."

Several instruments have been used while recording the score, including accordion, mandolin, acoustic guitar, pizzicato strings and so on, which are commonly found in contemporary Italian music. Composing of the film, began on late-July 2020, during the COVID-19 pandemic lockdown, and recording of the film score took place during mid-March, with Romer and team, adhering to the safety guidelines imposed to curb COVID-19 spread. A total of 82 musicians, performed the film score, with the orchestral play consisted of strings, brass, woodwind and percussion sections. The mixing and mastering of the score also began the following month.

Romer believed that, each kid has their own theme as the youngsters: Luca, Alberto and Giulia, dominate the story, he made sure that all three themes were harmonically compatible and could work in counterpoint during scenes that involved two or three at once. For the themes for Luca's parents, Romer used bass clarinet and tuba, as he felt "We thought it would be fun to have two low instruments that kind of bumbled back and forth [...] I ended up writing this rhythmic, melodic figure that was a call and response between the two instruments." The town of Portorosso, where the entire film took place, is "the place, where they wanted to lean into the romantic Italian-score side". Romer used Alberto's theme for the entitled sequel short film Ciao Alberto.

He called the final minute of the score "Go Find Out for Me", as the most challenging as Romer had stated "We didn't really have a guide as far as what we wanted it to sound like. We weren't really sure about, not the style, but we weren't sure about really what the sounds should be like. It was a lot of experimentation, and then we landed on this thing that was like, okay, it just needs to keep growing and growing and growing and growing and growing and drove past the point where you think it would possibly grow, and then hit the resolution of it far later than you would expect it to." He compared the score cue to Rihanna's track "We Found Love" and Weezer's "Only in Dreams" as "The idea was to make a piece of music that just grew and grew and grew and grew, and you felt like, 'This isn't gonna grow more, this shouldn't happen,' then it keeps going until the very last second."

== Reception ==
Jonathan Broxton stated: "Luca is a terrific little score; it's a fun, light, optimistic, charming love letter to Italian folk music, Federico Fellini, and Nino Rota, filled with heart and a sense of freedom and wonderment. It's also unexpectedly dense and impressively thematic, with Romer taking at least three major and three minor thematic ideas and playing them in a way which makes sense, and serves the story's dramatic needs." Alex Reif from Laughing Place reviewed "the score to Luca is lively and motivational, with occasional moments of somber melodies or frenzied action. Like the Pixar film, the score is unforgettable and easily gets stuck in your head. Whether you're trying to underscore your workday or just develop a deeper appreciation for Dan Romer's work on the film, you won't be disappointed by what the soundtrack has to offer." A review from IndieWire had stated "The first way that Luca differentiates itself from the rest of the Pixar canon is with music. The staccato punctuation of Dan Romer's score immediately distances this from anything the studio has made before (despite a familiar underwater setting). The composer summons his signature tremble and swell to set the stage for a movie that eschews the vast adventure of Finding Nemo (2003) for something more in-the-moment and driven by the capriciousness of youth."

== Track listing ==
No.	Title	Length
1.	"Meet Luca"	4:08
2.	"Did You Hide?"	1:04
3.	"The Curious Fish"	1:39
4.	"You Forgot Your Harpoon"	0:39
5.	"Phantom Tail"	2:09
6.	"Walking Is Just like Swimming"	2:02
7.	"Vespa è libertà"	1:42
8.	"You Hold the Ramp"	0:59
9.	"Silenzio Bruno"	0:41
10.	"That's the Dream"	2:05
11.	"The Bottom of the Ocean"	1:52
12.	"Take Me, Gravity"	1:44
13.	"Portorosso"	1:36
14.	"Signor Vespa"	1:17
15.	"This Isn't Any Old Race"	2:55
16.	"Buonanotte, Boys"	1:27
17.	"Land Monsters Everywhere"	0:55
18.	"Buongiorno Massimo"	3:03
19.	"The Out of Town Weirdo Tax"	1:48
20.	"Rules Are for Rule People"	1:08
21.	"How Humans Swim"	1:03
22.	"Not Our Kid"	0:49
23.	"Telescope"	2:46
24.	"Beyond the Solar System"	1:02
25.	"We Don't Need Anybody"	1:54
26.	"The Sea Monster"	3:33
27.	"I Wish I Could Take It Back"	4:01
28.	"The Portorosso Cup"	7:34
29.	"How to Find the Good Ones"	5:14
30.	"Go Find Out for Me"	1:39
Total length:		64:28

== Italian songs and opera arias ==
The film features Italian songs and opera arias including:

- "Un bacio a mezzanotte" by Quartetto Cetra
- "O mio babbino caro", from the opera Gianni Schicchi by Giacomo Puccini, sung by Maria Callas
- "Il gatto e la volpe" by Edoardo Bennato
- "Andavo a cento all'ora" by Gianni Morandi
- "Tintarella di luna" by Mina
- "Fatti mandare dalla mamma a prendere il latte" by Gianni Morandi
- "Viva la pappa col pomodoro" by Rita Pavone
- "Città vuota" by Mina
- "Una voce poco fa" by Budapest Failoni Chamber Orchestra, from the opera The Barber of Seville by Gioachino Rossini
- "Largo al factotum", from The Barber of Seville by Gioachino Rossini

== Charts ==
Chart (2021)	Peak position
UK Independent Albums (OCC)	15
UK Soundtrack Albums (OCC)	23
US Billboard 200	49
US Soundtrack Albums (Billboard)	11
