= Fatti mandare dalla mamma a prendere il latte =

Single by Gianni Morandi

from the album Gianni Morandi
- B-side: "Meglio il Madison"
- Released: 1962
- Genre: Pop; Twist
- Length: 2:13
- Label: RCA Italiana
- Songwriters: Franco Migliacci, Bruno Zambrini
- Producer: Franco Migliacci

Gianni Morandi singles chronology
"Go-Kart Twist" (1962)	"Fatti mandare dalla mamma a prendere il latte" (1962)	"Twist dei vigili" (1962)

Audio
- "Fatti mandare dalla mamma a prendere il latte" on YouTube

"Fatti mandare dalla mamma a prendere il latte" (transl. "Tell your mom to send you to get the milk"), also known as simply "Fatti mandare dalla mamma", is a 1962 Italian song composed by Franco Migliacci (lyrics) Luis Bacalov and Bruno Zambrini (music) and performed by Gianni Morandi.

== Overview ==
The song was the first hit for Morandi, and became a long-selling classic of his repertoire. The song was launched in the RAI television show Alta pressione. In 2023, on the occasion of its 60th anniversary, Morandi recorded a new version of the song in duet with Sangiovanni, which premiered out of competition at the Sanremo Music Festival 2023.

The song was included in the soundtrack of the Pixar film Luca.

== Track listing ==
No.	Title	Lyrics	Music	Length
1.	"Fatti mandare dalla mamma a prendere il latte"	Franco Migliacci	Luis Bacalov	2:13
2.	"Meglio il Madison"	Migliacci	Bacalov	2:33

== Charts ==
=== Weekly charts ===
Chart (1962)	Peak position
Italy (Musica e dischi)	3
