= Dan Romer =

American record producer and composer

- Education: Purchase College (BMus)
- Genres: Film and television score, pop, electronic, new-age, jazz
- Occupations: Film composer, music producer, multi-instrumentalist, songwriter
- Instruments: Piano, keyboards, synthesizer, accordion, guitar, bass guitar, lap steel guitar, banjo, mandolin, ukelele, percussion
- Website: www.danromer.com

Dan Romer is an American film composer, music producer, multi-instrumentalist and songwriter based in Los Angeles.

== Career ==
As a film composer, Romer's scores include four-time Oscar-nominated Beasts of the Southern Wild, Beasts of No Nation, Chasing Coral, Gleason, The Good Doctor and the Emmy-winning Jim: The James Foley Story. His score for the HBO miniseries Station Eleven was also nominated for an Emmy in 2022. Romer scored the Ubisoft video game Far Cry 5 released on March 27, 2018.

He has produced music for numerous artists including A Great Big World and Christina Aguilera, whose single "Say Something", topped charts around the world, hit 6× Platinum, sold over seven million copies, and won a 2015 Grammy. Dan co-produced "Treat You Better" by Shawn Mendes which reached No. 1 on the iTunes chart and No. 3 on the US Top 40 pop radio charts in September 2016. Romer composed the score to the Pixar animated feature film, Luca, which was the most-watched streaming film of 2021, with over 10.6 billion minutes watched. He worked with Justin Paul on the incidental underscore for Stephen Chbosky's 2021 film adaptation of Broadway musical Dear Evan Hansen. He also scored the television series Superman & Lois (2021–24), A Knight of the Seven Kingdoms (2026) and the 2025 live-action remake of Lilo & Stitch.

== Discography ==
=== As composer ===
==== Film ====
Year	Title	Director	Notes
2007	Death to the Tinman	Ray Tintori	Short films
2008	Glory at Sea	Benh Zeitlin (2)	Short films
2012	Beasts of the Southern Wild	Benh Zeitlin (2)	Co-composed with Benh Zeitlin
2012	Sleepwalking in the Rift	Cary Joji Fukunaga	Short film
2014	Tomorrow We Disappear	Jim Goldblum & Adam M. Weber	Documentary films
2014	The Last Season	Sara Dosa	Documentary films
2014	The Life and Death of Tommy Chaos and Stacey Danger	Michael Lukk Litwak (2)	Short films
2014	The Organization	Michael Lukk Litwak (2)	Short films
2015	Walter	Anna Mastro	
2015	Digging for Fire	Joe Swanberg	
2015	Finders Keepers	Bryan Carberry & J. Clay Tweel	Documentary film
2015	Stryka	Emily Carmichael	Short film
2015	Mediterranea	Jonas Carpignano	Co-composed with Benh Zeitlin
2015	Beasts of No Nation	Cary Joji Fukunaga (2)	
2015	Napoleon in Exile	Michael Lukk Litwak (3)	Short film
2016	Jim: The James Foley Story	Brian Oakes	Documentary films
2016	Gleason	J. Clay Tweel (2)	Documentary films
2016	Katie Says Goodbye	Wayne Roberts	
2017	The Little Hours	Jeff Baena	
2017	Chasing Coral	Jeff Orlowski	Documentary film
2017	Freak Show	Trudie Styler	
2017	Brimstone & Glory	Viktor Jakovleski	Documentary film
2017	Win It All	Joe Swanberg (2)	
2017	A Ciambra	Jonas Carpignano (2)	
2017	Shot in the Dark	Dustin Nakao-Haider	Documentary film
2017	Krystal	William H. Macy	
2018	Dinosaur	Jim Goldblum (2)	Short films
2018	Period. End of Sentence.	Rayka Zehtabchi	Short films
2018	Zoe	Drake Doremus	
2018	Skin	Guy Nattiv	
2020	Wendy	Benh Zeitlin (3)	
2021	After Antarctica	Tasha Van Zandt	Documentary film
2021	Luca	Enrico Casarosa	
2021	A Chiara	Jonas Carpignano (3)	Co-composed with Benh Zeitlin
2021	Dear Evan Hansen	Stephen Chbosky	Incidental score; co-composed with Justin Paul; original songs by Pasek and Paul
2021	Ciao Alberto	Kenna Harris	Short film
2023	Self Reliance	Jake Johnson	
2023	Mustache	Imran J. Khan	
2023	Crater	Kyle Patrick Alvarez	Co-composed with Osei Essed
2023	The Promised Land	Nikolaj Arcel	
2023	Woman of the Hour	Anna Kendrick	Co-composed with Mike Tuccillo
2023	Genie	Sam Boyd	
2023	Amelia	Lorenzo Nicolino	Short film
2024	My Dead Friend Zoe	Kyle Hausmann-Stokes	
2024	Who Am I	Johanna Block	
2024	The Bitter Pill	J. Clay Tweel (3)	Documentary film
2025	Death of a Unicorn	Alex Scharfman	Replaced John Carpenter, Cody Carpenter and Daniel Davies; co-composed with Giosuè Greco
2025	Lilo & Stitch	Dean Fleischer Camp	Original themes by Alan Silvestri
2025	Horsegirls	Lauren Meyering	
2026	Next Life	Drake Doremus (2)	
2026	Cottagecore	Sonja O'Hara	

==== Television ====
Year	Title	Creator(s)	Developer(s)	Awards	Notes
2016–2019	Easy	Joe Swanberg	—N/a	—N/a	Episodes "Controlada" and "Chemistry Read"
2017–2021	Atypical	Robia Rashid	—N/a	—N/a	—N/a
2017–2024	The Good Doctor	—N/a	David Shore	Winner of an ASCAP Screen Music Award	—N/a
2018	Maniac	Patrick Somerville	Cary Joji Fukunaga; Patrick Somerville	—N/a	—N/a
2019–present	Ramy	Ramy Youssef; Ari Katcher; Ryan Welch	—N/a	—N/a	Co-composed with Mike Tuccillo
2020–2021	Love Life	Sam Boyd	—N/a	—N/a	Co-composed with Mike Tuccillo
2021–2024	Superman & Lois	—N/a	Greg Berlanti; Todd Helbing	—N/a	—N/a
2021–2022	Station Eleven	Patrick Somerville	—N/a	Emmy Nominee (Original Score in a Limited Series)	—N/a
2022	Little Demon	Darcy Fowler; Seth Kirschner; Kieran Valla	—N/a	—N/a	Composed with John Zarcone
2022–2025	Stranger Things	The Duffer Brothers	—N/a	—N/a	Orchestral cues composed with Rob Simonsen; score by Kyle Dixon and Michael Stein
2026	A Knight of the Seven Kingdoms	Ira Parker; George R.R. Martin	—N/a	—N/a	Game of Thrones themes by Ramin Djawadi
2026	Kevin	Joe Wengert; Aubrey Plaza	—N/a	—N/a	—N/a
2026	Little House on the Prairie				

==== Video games ====
Year	Title	Publisher	Awards	Notes
2018	Far Cry 5	Ubisoft		

=== Music producer ===
Year	Song	Artist	Certifications
2004	Coalmine	The Woes	
2005	Batten the Hatches	Jenny Owen Youngs	
2009	Transmitter Failure	Jenny Owen Youngs	
2009	Everybody	Ingrid Michaelson	
2010	Songs for a Sinking Ship	April Smith and the Great Picture Show	
2012	Safe Travels	Jukebox the Ghost	
2013	"Say Something"	A Great Big World & Christina Aguilera	RIAA: 6× Platinum, ARIA: 4× Platinum, MC: 6× Platinum, RMNZ: 2× Platinum, GLF: 2× Platinum, BPI: 1× Platinum, IFPI: 1× Platinum
2014	Is There Anybody Out There?	A Great Big World	The album debuted on the Billboard 200 at No. 3.
2014	Jukebox the Ghost	Jukebox the Ghost	
2015	When the Morning Comes	A Great Big World	US Billboard No. 75
2016	"Treat You Better"	Shawn Mendes	RIAA: 3× Platinum, MC: Platinum, ARIA: 3× Platinum, BPI: Platinum, FIMI: 3× Platinum
2018	"We Can Do Better"	Matt Simons	
2021	Dear Evan Hansen	Various artists	Nominated for Best Original Motion Picture Soundtrack at the 64th Annual Grammy Awards
