= Fuck Was I =

2007 single by Jenny Owen Youngs

Single by Jenny Owen Youngs

from the album Batten the Hatches
- B-side: "Hot in Herre"
- Released: 2007
- Genre: Folk rock
- Length: 3:30
- Label: Nettwerk
- Songwriter(s): Jenny Owen Youngs
- Producer(s): Dan Romer

Jenny Owen Youngs singles chronology
"Fuck Was I" (2007)	"Things We Don't Need Anymore" (2007)

Music video
- "Fuck Was I" on YouTube

"Fuck Was I" is a song by Jenny Owen Youngs, from her 2005 album Batten the Hatches. Its name refers to the phrase "What the fuck was I thinking?"

Youngs wrote it "between (her) junior and senior years at SUNY Purchase". She is accompanied by Dan Romer (organ) and Patrick Petty (cello).

== Reception ==
Spin called it a "stand-out" — an opinion shared by Autostraddle, who also called it a "stirring anthem for the regretful". MusicOMH considered it "rueful", while LA Weekly described it as an "antilove song" that evinces Youngs' "unexpectedly wicked sense of humor". Pop Matters described it as "attention-grabbing" and "charming at first", but faulted it for being "a little too self-conscious" with some lyrics that are "overwrought", judging that it was "an example of all that is both right and wrong with Batten the Hatches".

== Track listings and formats ==
- CD single
1. "Fuck Was I" (uncensored) – 3:32
2. "Fuck Was I" (Morgan Page remix edit) – 3:49
3. "Hot in Herre" – 4:18
4. "Fuck Was I" (Morgan Page remix) – 6:47

== Credits and personnel ==
Credits and personnel are adapted from the Batten the Hatches album liner notes.

- Jenny Owen Youngs – vocals, writer
- Dan Romer – producer, engineering, mixing, arrangement, electric piano
- Andrew Futral – arrangement assistance
- Andrew Platt – bass
- Patrick Petty – cello
- Adam Christgau – drums
- Hawk – viola, voice
- Bob Pycior – violin
- Jay Newland – mastering
