= John-Allison Weiss =

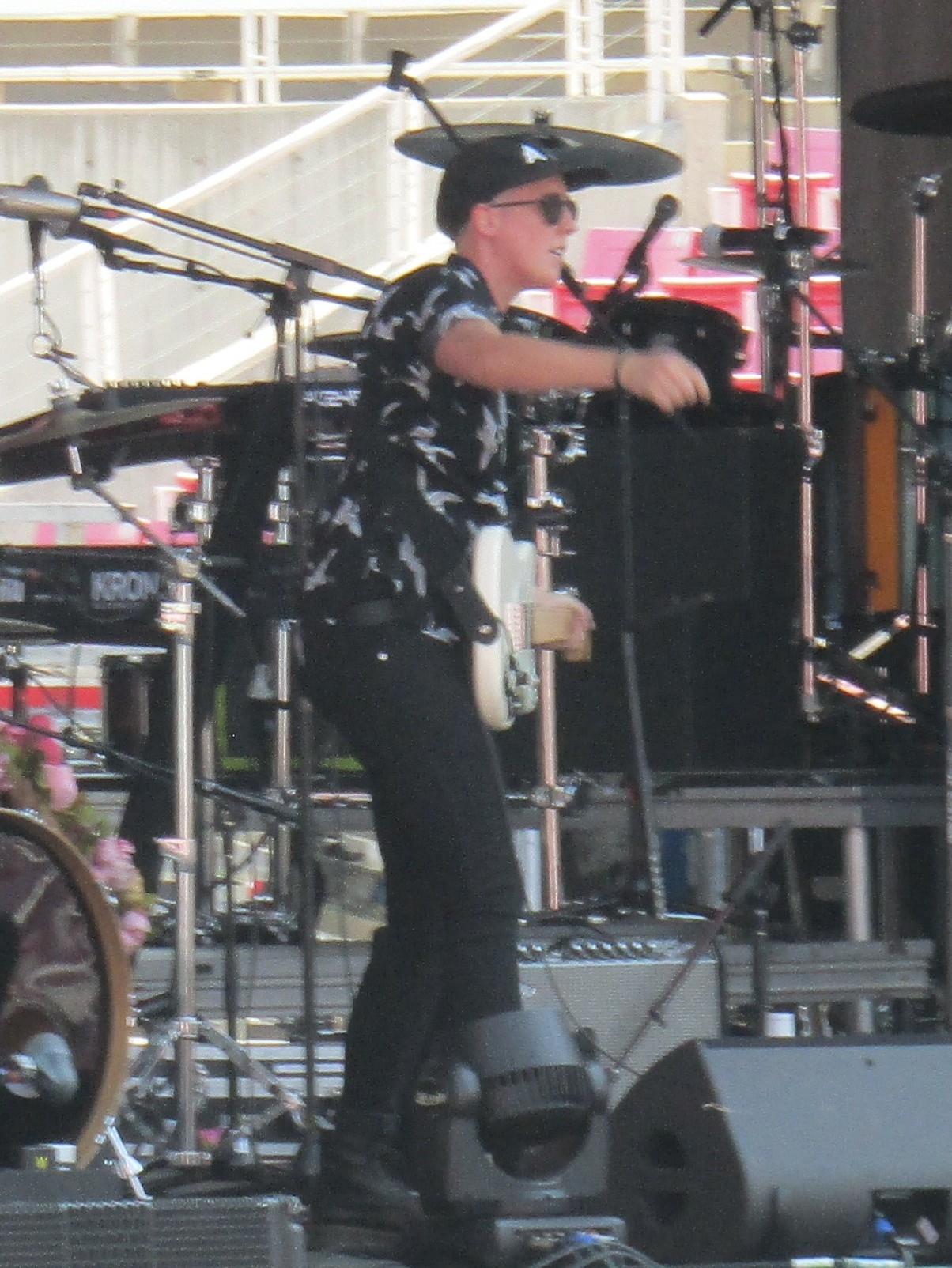
- Weiss performing at LoveLoud Festival in 2018

Background information
- Born: April 13, 1987 (age 39); Grosse Pointe, Michigan, U.S.
- Origin: Flowery Branch, Georgia, U.S.
- Genres: Indie pop, folk rock, country
- Years active: 2007–present
- Labels: SideOneDummy Records, No Sleep Records, Get Better Records, Lower Key Music
- Spouse: Joanna Katcher (2016-2022) Eddie Chaffer (2026–present)

John-Allison Weiss (born April 13, 1987) is an American singer-songwriter known for emotionally resonant songwriting, a strong DIY ethos, and blending indie pop, folk, and alt-country. Emerging in the late 2000s, Weiss built a following through crowdfunding, touring, and independent releases. In 2020, they launched the project Charlie Mtn., exploring country storytelling rooted in queer identity.

== Career ==
Weiss released their debut EP, An Eight-Song Tribute to Feeling Bad and Feeling Better, in 2007 while attending the University of Georgia, followed by Live at Sidewalk NYC (2008). In 2009, they funded their first studio album, ...Was Right All Along, via Kickstarter, exceeding their goal and receiving coverage in The New York Times Magazine.

In 2013, Weiss released Say What You Mean and its acoustic companion Sideways Sessions on No Sleep Records. The Remember When EP followed in 2014. In 2015, Weiss signed with SideOneDummy Records and released New Love, produced by Forrest Kline of Hellogoodbye and Bradley Hale of Now, Now.

In 2020, Weiss debuted the Charlie Mtn. project with the GD EP, but a planned tour was canceled due to the COVID-19 pandemic. In 2025, they crowdfunded a full-length album recorded with Freddy Angelico, Bess Rogers, and Chris Kuffner.

On February 17, 2023, Weiss released The Long Way via Get Better Records. New Noise Magazine described it as "the magnum opus culmination of Weiss’ chrysalis", adding that "layers of happiness and distress will be discovered in every song." The title track reflected Weiss's perspective:

it's okay to take your time and at your own pace ... whatever road you take is the right one.

The lead single, "Different Now", was described as "plunking the listener on the gym floor, dancing somewhere between The Pixies and Matt Skiba".

== Personal life and identity ==
Weiss came out as non-binary in 2017 and uses they/them pronouns. They have spoken publicly about their vocal transition, stating, "I had to learn to sing again." They live and record off-grid in a trailer studio.

== Tours and collaborations ==
- 2009
  - Jenny Owen Youngs, Bess Rogers: Spring Break Forever Tour.
- 2012
  - The Front Bottoms (UK): Acoustic support on multi-city tour.
  - Lou Reed (Europe): Backing vocals on the Lulu tour, returning for two UK dates.
- 2013
  - Laura Jane Grace (of Against Me!): Opened at Bowery Ballroom.
  - Vans Warped Tour (U.S.): Acoustic stage performer.
  - The Fest 12.
- 2014
  - Vans Warped Tour.
  - The Fest 13.
  - Matt Pryor (of The Get Up Kids): Solo tour support.
  - Max Bemis (of Say Anything): Solo tour support.
- 2015
  - Jenny Owen Youngs (UK): Co-headline tour.
  - Anthony Raneri (of Bayside) and Laura Stevenson: U.S. support dates.
- 2016
  - Aaron West and the Roaring Twenties: Summer tour support.
  - Letters to Cleo: support show at the Rickshaw Stop, San Francisco, October 20, 2016.
- 2017
  - Tim Kasher (of Cursive / The Good Life): Selected dates.
  - The Smith Street Band: Australian tour.
- 2018
  - The Wonder Years: UK tour support.
  - LoveLoud Festival: Rice-Eccles Stadium appearance.
- 2021
  - The Fest 19.
- 2023–2025
  - Mal Blum: Multiple tours and design collaborations.

== Other endeavors ==
Outside of music, Weiss is a freelance visual artist who has created merchandise and album art for The Wonder Years, Future Teens, Pomplamoose, Mal Blum, Jenny Owen Youngs, Chris Farren, Microwave, and A Great Big World.

They have also engaged in LGBTQ+ advocacy. In collaboration with Kristin Russo, Weiss launched "OUR Restroom", a campaign supporting gender-inclusive bathroom access.

== Media appearances ==
- In 2017, appeared on Queery with Cameron Esposito.
- Guest on Improv for Humans with Matt Besser.
- During 2013 and 2014 Vans Warped Tour, collaborated with PETA2.
- In 2022, their song "New Love" was used in a Taco Bell Cantina Crispy Chicken Tacos commercial.

== Discography ==
Studio albums

- ...Was Right All Along (2009)
- Say What You Mean (2013)
- New Love (2015)
- The Long Way (2023)

As Charlie Mtn.

- GD EP (2020)
- Upcoming crowdfunded album (2025)
