= Buffering the Vampire Slayer =

Podcast about Buffy the Vampire Slayer

Cast and voices
- Hosted by: Jenny Owen Youngs; Kristin Russo

Publication
- No. of seasons: 7
- No. of episodes: 189 (as of May 2023)
- Updates: every other week

Related
- Website: www.bufferingthevampireslayer.com

Buffering the Vampire Slayer is a podcast about the TV series Buffy the Vampire Slayer, hosted by fans Jenny Owen Youngs and Kristin Russo. Each podcast episode analyzes one episode of Buffy the Vampire Slayer, and concludes with an original song created by Youngs and Russo related to the Buffy episode's themes. Some episodes feature interviews with notable actors and collaborators from the series.

== Hosts ==
Kristin Russo (born December 17, 1980) is an American speaker, personality, and LGBT activist. She is the CEO and editor-in-chief of Everyone Is Gay and My Kid Is Gay. She also supports organizations that provide advice, guidance, and education to LGBTQIA youth and their families and is the co-author of This Is a Book for Parents of Gay Kids (Chronicle Books, 2014).

Jenny Owen Youngs (born November 22, 1981) is an American singer-songwriter. She has released three albums and several EPs, both independently and via Nettwerk Records, and has toured worldwide. Youngs has also collaborated with artists such as Brett Dennen, Ingrid Michaelson, Shungudzo, and Pitbull. She is a co-writer on the 2018 Panic! at the Disco single "High Hopes".

Youngs and Russo were married when the podcast began, and separated in May 2018. They have been described as contributing to a "golden age of queer women in podcasting".

== Format ==
Each episode of Buffering reviews an episode of Buffy, summarizing relevant scenes in the episode and adding commentary on the wider themes. The episodes are spoiler free, avoiding discussion of any plot points beyond the Buffy episode being discussed.

On November 7, 2024, Russo and Youngs announced Buffering the Vampire Slayer: Once More, With Spoilers, a new podcast in which they review every episode of Buffy again, now including spoilers and discussion of the wider Buffyverse.

== Music ==
Each episode of Buffering includes an original song by Youngs and Russo reflecting the themes of the Buffy episode discussed. All songs from completed seasons of the podcast are compiled into albums that are available on Spotify and Apple Music as well as on CD. The lyrics are also published on the Buffering the Vampire Slayer website.

Youngs is accompanied by guest musicians on several songs, including Tancred, Bess Rogers, Chris Farren, and The One AM Radio.

In their coverage of Once More, With Feeling, the musical episode in the sixth season of Buffy, the Buffering cast created a full-length musical podcast episode titled Once More With Once More, With Feeling. A vinyl album was released with the 17 songs from the episode.

Youngs and Russo have also created jingles honouring specific characters from the Buffyverse, including Spike, Giles, and Vampire Willow.

== Guests ==
Special interviews and appearances on Buffering the Vampire Slayer have included:

- Kate Leth, who provided sporadic "Buffy Fashion Watch" segments to the show
- Armin Shimerman, who played Principal Snyder in Seasons 1–3 of Buffy
- Kristine Sutherland, who played Buffy's mother, Joyce Summers, in Seasons 1–5 of Buffy
- Harry Groener, who played Mayor Richard Wilkins III in Season 3 of Buffy
- Nerf Herder, the band who wrote the Buffy theme song
- Doug Jones, who played the leader of the Gentleman in the Season 4 episode "Hush"
- James Marsters, who played Spike in Seasons 2–7 of Buffy and Seasons 1, 2, and 5 of Angel
- Sophia Crawford, who was the stunt double for Sarah Michelle Gellar in Seasons 1–4 of Buffy
- Jeff Pruitt, who was the stunt coordinator on Seasons 1–4 of Buffy
- Lindsay Crouse, who played Professor Maggie Walsh in Season 4 of Buffy
- David Wells, who played the Cheese Man in the Season 4 episode "Restless"
- Seth Green, who played Daniel "Oz" Osbourne in Seasons 2–4 of Buffy and Season 1 of Angel
- Charisma Carpenter, who played Cordelia Chase on Seasons 1–3 of Buffy and every season of Angel
- Mercedes McNab, who played Harmony in Seasons 1-5 of Buffy and Seasons 2 and 5 of Angel

== Motivation ==
Russo and Young's motivation to create the podcast was based on their interests in fandom, science fiction and queer politics. According to the duo, they "wanted to make a Buffy podcast forever" to navigate these topics in relation to the series. The podcasts often focuses on the politics and social movements within Buffy, including "analyzing the lack of racial diversity in the early seasons of the show, misogynistic and patriarchal themes as they pop up, and the queer subtext".

== Reception ==
The podcast has received praise for its narrative and presentation. It was included on Esquire magazine's "21 Best Podcasts of 2018,"Time magazine's "The 50 Best Podcasts to Listen to Right Now",BuzzFeed's "27 Podcasts You Need to Listening to in 2018", and Autostraddle's "14 Best Podcasts For Escaping News & Politics (2017)", and top 9 queer-run podcasts.

== Community ==
Buffering the Vampire Slayer is financially supported by over 3,800 patrons on Patreon.

Russo and Youngs have hosted multiple Buffering events, including live episode recordings and "Buffy Prom" held at Torrance High School, the filming location of Buffy the Vampire Slayer's Sunnydale High.

== Spin-offs ==
Upon Buffering's commencement of Buffy Season 4 coverage, a spin-off podcast, Angel on Top, was created. Angel on Top discusses the TV show Angel and was hosted by Brittany Ashley and Laura Zak in seasons 1-2, and is currently hosted by LaToya Ferguson and Morgan Luditch. The show derives its name from a line in the Buffy the Vampire Slayer episode "Amends". Buffering the Vampire Slayer and Angel on Top are released on alternating weeks.

Following the conclusion of their coverage of the seven seasons of Buffy, the hosts launched a new podcast under the banner Buffering: A Rewatch Adventure where they review other TV shows in a similar format. In one Buffering series called The eX Files, Russo and Youngs review The X-Files.

== Book ==
Russo and Youngs published a joint memoir through St. Martin's Press on April 8, 2025 titled Slayers, Every One of Us: How One Girl in All the World Showed Us How to Hold On. It is narrated by both authors in alternating sections and tells the story of the creation of the podcast, the eventual end of their marriage, and the continuation of the podcast beyond the end of their romantic relationship. The title is a reference to Buffy's speech in the series finale, Chosen. The New York Times called it "[A] joyful ode to the awesome ability of pop-culture arcana to create a solid community."
