= Gatto (film) =

Upcoming Pixar film

- Theatrical release poster
- Directed by: Enrico Casarosa
- Screenplay by: Enrico Casarosa; Tripper Clancy; Andy Siara
- Produced by: Andrea Warren
- Starring: Mark Ruffalo; Laurence Fishburne; Enrico Casarosa; Bianca Babaşa; Sherry Cola; John Turturro; Rumen Sali Shopov; Rhys Darby; Isabella Rosellini
- Cinematography: David Bianchi; Brian Boyd
- Edited by: Catherine Apple
- Music by: Dario Marianelli
- Production company: Pixar Animation Studios
- Distributed by: Walt Disney Studios; Motion Pictures (Note: Distributed under the Walt Disney Pictures banner.)
- Release date: March 5, 2027
- Country: United States
- Language: English

Gatto is an upcoming American animated comedy film produced by Pixar Animation Studios for Walt Disney Pictures. Directed by Enrico Casarosa, and written by Casarosa, Tripper Clancy and Andy Siara, it stars Mark Ruffalo, Laurence Fishburne, Casarosa, Bianca Babaşa, Sherry Cola, John Turturro, Rumen Sali Shopov, Rhys Darby, and Isabella Rosellini. Set in Venice, Italy, the story follows a black cat named Nero (Ruffalo), who begins to question whether he is living the right life.

Casarosa began developing his next original Pixar feature film after Luca (2021), with the film being announced in October 2022. The title was first officially announced as Gatto in June 2025, with initial cast members being announced the following year. The film blends a 2D hand-painted style with computer animation.

Gatto is scheduled to be released in the United States on March 5, 2027.

== Premise ==
Nero, a black cat living in Venice, Italy, begins to question whether he is living the right life.

== Voice cast ==
- Mark Ruffalo as Nero, a black stray cat who dislikes water and likes music
- Laurence Fishburne as Rocco, a cat mob boss who Nero works for
- Enrico Casarosa as Saverio, a slapstick pigeon who is an advocate of a pigeon union group
- Bianca Babaşa as Maja, a human street musician who adopts Nero against his will
- Sherry Cola as Regina
- John Turturro as Capitano Briganti, the superstitious head of police in Venice
- Rumen Sali Shopov as Papu Janko, Maja’s relative
- Rhys Darby as Focaccia, a siamese cat who works for Rocco
- Isabella Rossellini as Contessa
- Natasia Demetriou as Charon, a sphynx cat from the underworld who cuts a whisker off of Nero for each life he lost
- Jamie Demetriou as the Plague Doctor, an ostrich from the underworld who gives Nero nine lives
- Jason Schwartzman as Vivaldi
- Saverio Raimondo as Ugo
- Jason Mantzoukas as Rico, a brown rat and a father to many babies
- Matt Jones as Enzo, a brown cat with a cross marking on his head who works for Rocco
- Tracey Ullman as Luisa
- Marco Calvani as Maestro Foscari
- Jesse Andrews as Bartolomeo
- Austin Madison as Fishmonger
- Beatrice Manfredi as Martinelli

== Production ==
In October 2022, Enrico Casarosa announced that he was developing a new original feature film for Pixar. At the 2025 Annecy International Animation Film Festival on June 13, Pixar's chief creative officer Pete Docter officially announced the film titled Gatto, with Andrea Warren serving as the producer, and showed a first-look image of the film with the main character Nero in the Venetian canals. Pixar's art director, Gastón Ugarte, said that the image was not concept art, but the final look that the film would have, which blends a 2D hand-painted style with computer animation.

In May 2026, it was revealed that Mark Ruffalo would voice Nero. The following month, with the release of the teaser trailer, it was revealed that Laurence Fishburne joined the cast. At the 2026 Annecy International Animation Film Festival on June 26, Casarosa announced that he would voice Saverio. The rest of the cast was announced in November 2026.

=== Music ===
Alongside the release of the official trailer, it was announced that Dario Marianelli would compose the score.

== Release ==
Gatto is scheduled to be released in the United States by Walt Disney Studios Motion Pictures on March 5, 2027. The film will be accompanied by the Finding Nemo short film Loving Dory.

It was previously scheduled for June 18, 2027, before being pushed forward three months. On August 2, 2024, the film's original release date was reserved for an "untitled Pixar film". On September 25, 2025, it was announced that the film would share its release date with Sony Pictures Animation's Spider-Man: Beyond the Spider-Verse, but on December 22, 2025, Disney brought forward the film to its current release date to avoid competition with Beyond the Spider-Verse as well as DreamWorks Animation's Shrek 5.
