= Gino La Monica =

Italian actor

- Born: Luigi La Monica; 14 March 1944 (age 82); Portici, Italy
- Occupations: Actor; voice actor; dubbing director
- Years active: 1965–present
- Spouse: Emanuela Giovannini (m. 2012)
- Children: Alessia; Carolina

Luigi "Gino" La Monica (born 14 March 1944) is an Italian actor and voice actor.

== Biography ==
Trained at the Accademia Nazionale di Arte Drammatica Silvio D'Amico, La Monica started acting in theatre and television in the 1960s, working with directors such as Luchino Visconti, Ettore Giannini, Sandro Bolchi and Anton Giulio Majano. He also performed alongside Bud Spencer in the 1977 film Charleston. In 2011 he played the part of Cardinal Altamirano in the international musical play The Mission, inspired from Roland Joffé and Robert Bolt's film of the same name, where he had also previously dubbed Jeremy Irons' role of Father Gabriel in the Italian post-synchronized version.

In 2021, La Monica was cast by Walt Disney Pictures/Pixar Animation Studios to voice Tommaso in the animated film Luca, also reprising his role in the Italian-dubbed version.

Gino La Monica is known to the Italian public as a voice dubbing artist, having dubbed over the voices of Christopher Walken, William Hurt, Sam Neill, Richard Gere, Dustin Hoffman in The Graduate and David Hemmings in Deep Red. Other actors dubbed by him include Martin Sheen, Robert Redford, Harrison Ford, Michael Caine, Alan Rickman, Jonathan Pryce, Jeremy Irons and many others.

== Filmography ==
=== Films ===
Year	Title	Role(s)	Notes
1977	Charleston	Sergeant Roy	Comedy
2001	The House of Chicken	Prosecutor	
2001	A Lele - Il caso Scieri		Medium-length film
2006	I Lunes e la sfera di Lasifer	Narrator (voice)	Animated film
2006	Padre Pio	Wojtyla (voice)	Animated film
2007	Partire, Ritornare. In Viaggio con Tahar Ben Jelloun	Voice-over	Documentary
2011	Tutta colpa della musica		Comedy
2015	1200 km di bellezza	Voice-over	Documentary
2021	Luca	Tommaso (voice)	Animated film, original version and Italian dub
2021	Ciao Alberto	Additional voices	Animated short film

=== Television ===
Year	Title	Role(s)	Notes
1966	Il conte di Montecristo	Quarto marinaio	TV miniseries
1967	La fiera della vanità	Alfiere Stubble	TV miniseries
1972	I demoni	Satov	TV miniseries
1974	Un certo Marconi	Sid Ross	TV film
1975	Processo per l'uccisione di Raffaele Sonzogno giornalista romano	Giuseppe Luciani	TV miniseries
1979	Il signore di Ballantrae	Henry Durie	TV miniseries
1979	Il delitto Notarbartolo	Marchesano	TV miniseries
1980	L'eredità della priora	Andrea Guarna	TV miniseries
1980	Delitto in piazza	Mario Aldara	TV miniseries
1997	Caro maestro	Gianni Vivaldi	TV series
1998–1999	Una donna per amico	Professor Conti	TV series
2000	Il rumore dei ricordi	Giorgio	TV miniseries
2002	The Angel's House	Franco Manetti	TV film
2002	Lo zio d'America	Riccardo	TV series
2012	Il caso Enzo Tortora - Dove eravamo rimasti?	Dall'Ora	TV miniseries

=== Dubbing ===
==== Films (Animation, Italian dub) ====
Year	Title	Role(s)	Ref
1967	Asterix the Gaul	Narrator	
1968	Asterix and Cleopatra	Narrator	
1978	The Lord of the Rings	Elrond	
1999	Animal Farm	Benjamin	
2000	Titan A.E.	Professor Sam Tucker	
2004	The Adventures of Ichabod and Mr. Toad (2004 redub)	The Wind in the Willows segment narrator	
2006	Over the Hedge	Ozzie	

==== Films (Live action, Italian dub) ====
Year	Title	Role(s)	Original actor	Ref
1967	The Graduate	Benjamin Braddock	Dustin Hoffman	
1969	John and Mary	John	Dustin Hoffman	
1975	Deep Red	Marcus Daly	David Hemmings	
1976	Next Stop, Greenwich Village	Robert Fulmer	Christopher Walken	
1980	Flash Gordon	Flash Gordon	Sam J. Jones	
1983	Brainstorm	Dr. Michael Brace	Christopher Walken	
1984	Indiana Jones and the Temple of Doom	Indiana Jones	Harrison Ford	
1986	At Close Range	Bradford "Big Brad" Whitewood	Christopher Walken	
1986	The Mission	Father Gabriel	Jeremy Irons	
1990	Alice	Doug Tate	William Hurt	
1993	True Romance	Vincenzo Coccotti	Christopher Walken	
1995	The Prophecy	Gabriel	Christopher Walken	
1995	GoldenEye	Alec Trevelyan	Sean Bean	
1995	Search and Destroy	Kim Ulander	Christopher Walken	
1998	The Prophecy II	Gabriel	Christopher Walken	
1999	Star Wars: Episode I – The Phantom Menace	Qui-Gon Jinn	Liam Neeson	
2000	The Prophecy 3: The Ascent	Gabriel	Christopher Walken	
2000	X-Men	Robert Kelly	Bruce Davison	
2003	Pirates of the Caribbean: The Curse of the Black Pearl	Weatherby Swann	Jonathan Pryce	
2003	X2	Robert Kelly	Bruce Davison	
2005	The Brothers Grimm	General Vavarin Delatombe	Jonathan Pryce	
2006	Pirates of the Caribbean: The Curse of the Black Pearl	Weatherby Swann	Jonathan Pryce	
2007	Pirates of the Caribbean: At World's End	Weatherby Swann	Jonathan Pryce	
2008	The Incredible Hulk	Thaddeus E. "Thunderbolt" Ross	William Hurt	
2008	Bedtime Stories	Martin "Marty" Bronson	Jonathan Pryce	
2011	Cowboys & Aliens	Colonel Woodrow Dolarhyde	Harrison Ford	
2012	Ted	Sam J. Jones	Sam J. Jones	
2015	Ted 2	Sam J. Jones	Sam J. Jones	
2016	Captain America: Civil War	Thaddeus E. "Thunderbolt" Ross	William Hurt	
2017	Thor: Ragnarok	Odin actor	Sam Neill	
2017	The Man Who Invented Christmas	John Dickens	Jonathan Pryce	
2018	Avengers: Infinity War	Thaddeus E. "Thunderbolt" Ross	William Hurt	
2019	The Two Popes	Jorge Mario Cardinal Bergoglio	Jonathan Pryce	
2021	Black Widow	Thaddeus E. "Thunderbolt" Ross	William Hurt	
2022	Thor: Love and Thunder	Odin actor	Sam Neill	
2024	Dune: Part Two	Emperor Shaddam IV	Christopher Walken	

==== Television (Animation, Italian dub) ====
Year	Title	Role(s)	Notes	Ref
1976–1977	Magne Robo Gakeen	Narrator	Main cast	
1985	Story of the Alps: My Annette	Dr. Givette	Recurring role	
1997	Kassai and Luk	Narrator	Main cast	
2007–2009	In the Night Garden...	Narrator	Main cast	
2008	Avatar: The Last Airbender	Long Feng	Recurring role; Season 2	
2009–2015	Star Wars: The Clone Wars	Admiral Wullf Yularen	Recurring role	

==== Television (Live action, Italian dub) ====
Year	Title	Role(s)	Notes	Original actor	Ref
1984	The Blood of Others	Dieter Bergman	TV film	Sam Neill	
