= Transmitter Failure =

Studio album by Jenny Owen Youngs
- Released: May 26, 2009
- Genre: Indie, alternative rock
- Length: 47:36
- Label: Nettwerk

Jenny Owen Youngs chronology
The Take Off All Your Clothes EP (2007)	Transmitter Failure (2009)	An Unwavering Band of Light (2012)

Professional ratings
Review scores
Source	Rating
Allmusic	3.5/5 stars
Consequence of Sound	4/5 stars
PopMatters	7/10 stars

Transmitter Failure is the second album by American singer-songwriter Jenny Owen Youngs. It was released May 26, 2009, by the Nettwerk label.

== Track listing ==
All tracks are written by Jenny Owen Youngs except where noted

No.	Title	Length
1.	"First Person"	0:40
2.	"Led to the Sea" (Youngs, Dan Romer)	3:27
3.	"Dissolve"	3:49
4.	"Here Is a Heart" (Youngs, Bess Rogers, Dan Romer)	4:23
5.	"Clean Break"	3:02
6.	"If I Didn't Know" (Youngs, Dan Romer)	4:09
7.	"What Beats Within" (Youngs, Dan Romer, Osei Essed)	3:55
8.	"Secrets" (Youngs, Justin Pierre)	3:05
9.	"No More Words" (Youngs, Dan Romer)	6:29
10.	"Last Person"	3:15
11.	"Nighty Night" (Youngs, Dan Romer)	3:37
12.	"Transmitter Failure" (Youngs, Bess Rogers)	4:46
13.	"Start + Stop"	2:59
Total length:		47:36

== Personnel ==
=== Performance ===
- Jenny Owen Youngs – vocals, acoustic guitar, electric guitar, banjo, bass, ukulele
- Chris Kuffner – double bass, bass, voice
- Adam Christgau – drum kit, hands and feet, percussion, voice
- Dan Romer – electric guitar, keys, glockenspiel, marimba, programming, accordion, organ, banjo, acoustic guitar
- Bess Rogers – voice, electric guitar, flute
- Meredith Godreau – voice
- Saul Simon-MacWilliams – voice, moog
- Hiroko Taguchi – violin
- Olivier Manchon – violin
- Jessica Troy – viola
- Ben Kalb – cello
- Brad Gordon – mbira, percussion
- Wil Farr – voice
- Kenny Warren – trumpet
- Dave Smith – trombone

=== Recording ===
- Production and arrangements by Dan Romer
- Mixing by Ryan Freeland
- Mastering by Gavin Lurssen
- Engineering by – Dan Romer, Michael Trepagnier (strings), Adam Thompson (piano), George Gregory (strings and piano), Jesse Lauter (basic tracking), Nick Smeraski (basic tracking)
