= Batten the Hatches =

Studio album by Jenny Owen Youngs
- Released: 2005 (Canada)
- Genres: Indie, folk rock
- Length: 37:03; 41:07 (reissue)
- Labels: Self-released; Nettwerk (reissue)
- Producers: Ronen Ben Codor, Dan Romer

Jenny Owen Youngs chronology
The Scrappy Demo (2004)	Batten the Hatches (2005)	The Take Off All Your Clothes EP (2007)

Original cover
- 2005 self-release artwork

Professional ratings
Review scores
Source	Rating
Allmusic	3.5/5 stars
Marie Claire	4/5 stars
PopMatters	5/10 stars
Rock Sound	7/10 stars

Batten the Hatches is the debut album by American singer-songwriter Jenny Owen Youngs. Originally self-released in 2005 by Youngs, it was reissued with the bonus track "Drinking Song" two years later by the Nettwerk label.

The track "Fuck Was I" was used in the first episode of the second season of the Showtime series Weeds, to illustrate a scene in which main character Nancy Botwin, a part-time marijuana dealer, discovers that her new lover is in fact a DEA agent. This appearance reportedly led to sales of the album increasing from between five and ten per week to between twenty and thirty per day.

The album was listed as one of Guardian Unlimited's "Greatest Albums You've Never Heard" in a feature in November 2006.

== Track listing ==
All tracks written by Jenny Owen Youngs.

1. "Porchrail" – 1:45
2. "From Here" – 2:16
3. "Fuck Was I" – 3:30
4. "Lightning Rod" – 3:27
5. "Voice on Tape" – 3:03
  - Featuring Regina Spektor
6. "P.S." – 1:52
7. "Bricks" – 5:00
8. "Drinking Song" – 3:38
9. "Woodcut" – 4:18
10. "Coyote" – 3:14
11. "Keys Out Lights On" – 5:00
12. "Woodcut (The Age of Rockets remix)" – 4:04
  - Remix by Andrew Futral

== Personnel ==
=== Performance ===
- Jenny Owen Youngs – vocals, acoustic guitar, banjo, bass
- Oscar Chabebe – tabla
- Adam Christgau – drums
- Ronen Ben Codor – harmonium
- James Cucinotta – bass clarinet
- Willie Farr Jr. – electric guitar
- Andrew Futral – synthesizer
- Hawk – viola
- Chris Hembree – piano
- Cicero Jones – French horn
- Jordan McLean – flugelhorn
- Tim Petrochko – violin
- Patrick Petty – cello
- Andrew Platt – bass instrument
- Bess Rogers – flute, voice
- Dan Romer – bass, electric guitar, keys, voice
- Jon Samson – digital kittens
- Bob Pycior – violin

=== Recording ===
- Ronen Ben Codor – additional arrangements on track 11
- Andrew Futral – remix (track 12, reissued version), additional arrangements on tracks 3 & 5
- Jay Newland – mastering
- Dan Romer – production, engineering, arrangements, mixing

== Release history ==
Region	Date	Label	Format	Catalog
Canada	2005	Self-released	CD	
Canada, UK	April 10, 2007	Nettwerk	CD	0 6700 30648 2 8
