= Luca (2021 film) =

2021 film by Enrico Casarosa

- Release poster
- Directed by: Enrico Casarosa
- Screenplay by: Jesse Andrews; Mike Jones
- Story by: Enrico Casarosa; Jesse Andrews; Simon Stephenson
- Produced by: Andrea Warren
- Starring: Jacob Tremblay; Jack Dylan Grazer; Emma Berman; Saverio Raimondo; Maya Rudolph; Marco Barricelli; Jim Gaffigan
- Cinematography: David Juan Bianchi; Kim White
- Edited by: Catherine Apple; Jason Hudak
- Music by: Dan Romer
- Production company: Pixar Animation Studios
- Distributed by: Walt Disney Studios; Motion Pictures (Note: Distributed under the Walt Disney Pictures banner.)
- Release dates: June 13, 2021 (Aquarium of Genoa); June 18, 2021 (Disney+); March 22, 2024 (United States; theatrical)
- Running time: 95 minutes
- Country: United States
- Language: English
- Budget: $120–150 million
- Box office: $51.1 million

Luca is a 2021 American animated fantasy comedy film directed by Enrico Casarosa and written by Jesse Andrews and Mike Jones from a story developed by Casarosa, Andrews, and Simon Stephenson. Produced by Pixar Animation Studios for Walt Disney Pictures, it stars the voices of Jacob Tremblay, Jack Dylan Grazer, Emma Berman, Saverio Raimondo, Maya Rudolph, Marco Barricelli, and Jim Gaffigan. The film is set on the Italian Riviera in the 1950s, and centers on Luca Paguro (Tremblay), a young sea monster boy with the ability to assume human form while on land, who explores the town of Portorosso with his new best friends, Alberto Scorfano (Grazer) and Giulia Marcovaldo (Berman), experiencing a life-changing summer adventure.

Luca draws inspiration from Casarosa's childhood in Genoa, Italy. Several Pixar artists were sent to the Italian Riviera gathering research from Italian culture and environment to create Portorosso, the primary setting. The sea monsters, a "metaphor for feeling different", were loosely based on old Italian regional myths and folklore. As with the short film La Luna (2011), the design and animation were inspired by hand-drawn and stop motion works and Hayao Miyazaki's style. Casarosa described the result as a film that "pays homage to Federico Fellini and other classic Italian filmmakers, with a dash of Miyazaki in the mix too". Development on Luca lasted for five years, with production being done remotely during the COVID-19 pandemic. Dan Romer composed the film's musical score.

Luca premiered at the Aquarium of Genoa on June 13, 2021, and was released direct-to-streaming on Disney+ in the United States on June 18, 2021. It was released in theaters in countries without the streaming service, and given a simultaneous one-week theatrical run at Hollywood's El Capitan Theatre, from June 18 to 24, 2021. It was theatrically released in the United States on March 22, 2024.

The film received positive reviews from critics, and was the most-viewed streaming film of 2021, with over 10.6 billion minutes watched. It was nominated for Best Animated Feature Film at the 79th Golden Globe Awards and the 94th Academy Awards. A short film, Ciao Alberto, was released on Disney+ on November 12, 2021.

== Plot ==
In the summer in the 1950s, timid sea monster child Luca Paguro herds goatfish off the coast of the Italian town of Portorosso. One day, Luca meets Alberto Scorfano, a fellow sea monster kid living alone in an abandoned lighthouse. Alberto demonstrates how sea monsters transform into humans when they are dry. Luca begins sneaking out to meet Alberto against his parents' order to stay away from the surface, fearing that he might be hunted by humans. The boys quickly become friends, wishing to own a Vespa and travel around the world.

Upon discovering Luca's actions, his parents decide to send him to live in the deep with his uncle Ugo. To avoid this, Luca runs away from home and hides in Portorosso with Alberto. The boys run afoul of Ercole Visconti, the local bully and five-time champion of the Portorosso Cup, a triathlon of swimming, pasta-eating, and biking. When Ercole tries to soak Luca in a fountain, Giulia Marcovaldo, a young little girl, stops him. In hopes of winning the money needed for a Vespa, the boys team up with Giulia for the triathlon.

Giulia invites them to stay at her house and introduces her fisherman father, Massimo, who is prejudiced against sea monsters. Meanwhile, Luca's parents infiltrate the town to find their son. Giulia and Luca bond over their love of learning, to Alberto's ire. When Luca shows interest in attending school, Alberto intentionally reveals his own sea monster form to Giulia to prevent it, frightening her. Unwilling to give himself up, Luca feigns shock at the transformation, and a betrayed Alberto flees as Ercole's gang arrives to hunt him. Shortly after, Giulia finds out that Luca is a sea monster as well, and sends him away for his safety.

Luca heads to Alberto's hiding place in an effort to reconcile with him, and learns that Alberto was abandoned by his father long ago. Though Alberto declines to participate in the triathlon, Luca promises to win the Vespa to rebuild their friendship. The triathlon begins with Luca and Giulia competing separately. Luca successfully completes the swimming race in a diving suit and the pasta-eating contest without revealing himself, but it begins to rain during the bike race. Alberto shows up to give Luca an umbrella, but Ercole knocks it away, exposing Alberto's sea monster form and shocking the spectators and Ercole. Luca rescues Alberto, revealing his own true form, and the two bike towards the finish to get to the sea.

Giulia deliberately collides with Ercole's bike to stop him from harpooning Luca and Alberto, falling off her bike in the process. Luca and Alberto unintentionally cross the finish line before turning back to help Giulia. When Ercole and the other townsfolk confront the boys, Massimo stands up for them and insists that they have won. Luca is reunited with his family and the townsfolk accept the sea monsters, except Ercole, who is thrown into a fountain by his much-abused henchmen Ciccio and Guido.

Luca and Alberto buy an old Vespa with their winnings, but Alberto sells it to get a train ticket for Luca, allowing him to go to school in Genova with Giulia. Luca's family, Massimo, and Alberto see Luca and Giulia off at the train station, where they all promise to stay in touch. Luca meets Giulia's mother and attends school with Giulia, while Massimo adopts Alberto as his son.

In a short post-credits scene, Ugo talks to a stray goatfish about his great life in the depths of the ocean.

== Voice cast ==
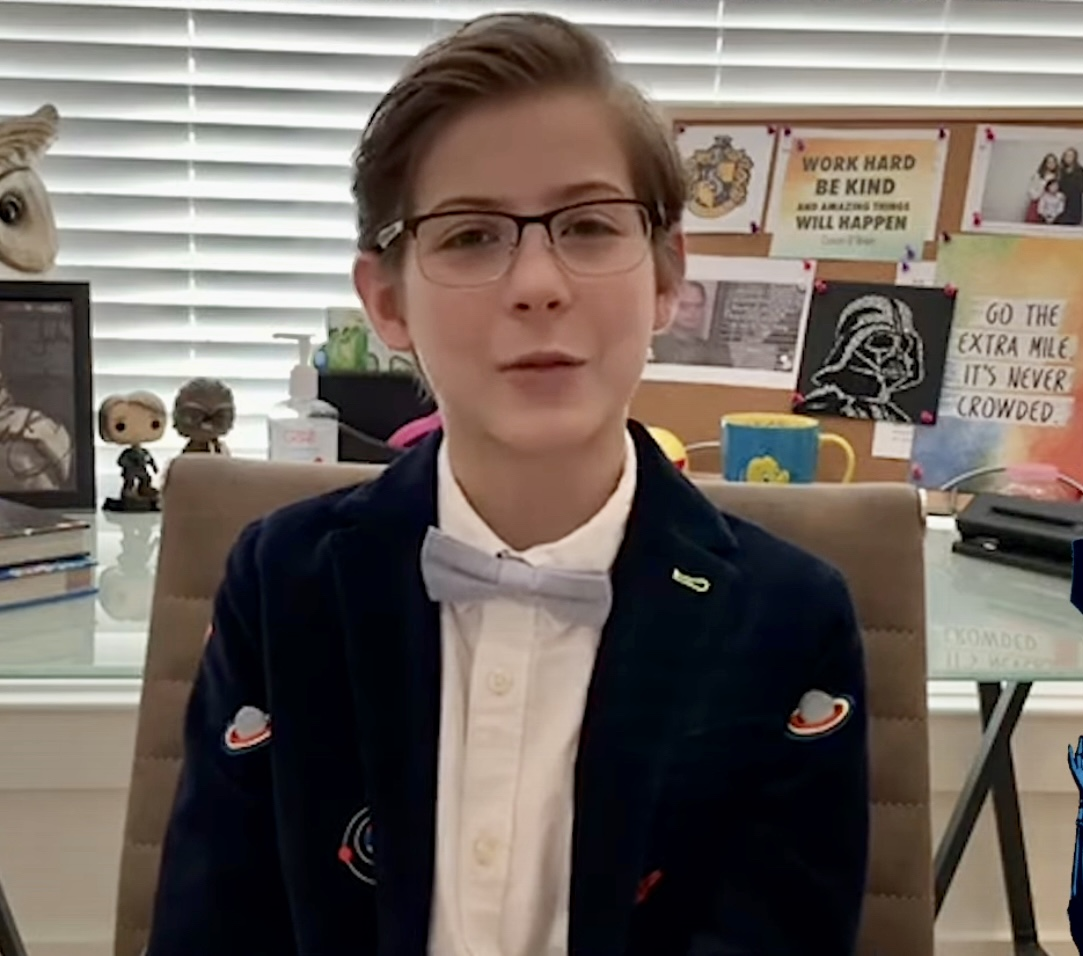
Jacob Tremblay voiced the title character

- Jacob Tremblay as Luca Paguro, a 13-year-old Italian "sea monster" boy who is curious about the world above the sea. He lives in the waters next to the Italian coast, in a farm where he herds goatfish with his parents. Although he has been warned his whole life that the human world is a dangerous place, he longs for something beyond his quiet farm life, so when Alberto takes him to explore Portorosso, his eyes open up to a whole world of possibilities. He and all other sea monsters take on human form when they are dry. Paguro means "hermit crab" in Italian.
- Jack Dylan Grazer as Alberto Scorfano, a 14-year-old Italian "sea monster" boy who is enthusiastic to explore the human world. He is a free-spirited, expressive, and gregarious boy who is "all about having fun". Despite his outgoing and free-spirited nature, he secretly hates living alone, as it is revealed that his only parent figure abandoned him in an island tower, leading him to feel lonely and insecure. Scorfano means "redfish" or "scorpionfish" in Italian.
- Emma Berman as Giulia Marcovaldo, a 13-year-old Italian girl who is something of an outcast in Portorosso, and befriends Luca and Alberto. She is an "outgoing and charming adventurer with a love of books and learning". To prepare for the role, Berman did some research by visiting a local Italian restaurant in San Francisco and met with an Italian waiter working there, who taught her how to speak Italian through some Zoom sessions.
- Saverio Raimondo as Ercole Visconti, an 18-year-old (Note: While Ercole's age is not revealed in the film since he won the Portorosso Cup the last five years in a row and also claimed to be 16 (apparently the oldest possible age to compete in it) for the year around 1959 and the previous year, he must be 17 at the absolute youngest (assuming that he was 12 the first time he won the Portorosso Cup). Eventually, director Enrico Casarosa confirmed that Ercole's age was around 18.) who is a cowardly bully. A repeat champion of the town's Portorosso Cup race despite many people pointing out he is too old for it, he is "a Vespa-owning, pompadoured blowhard who believes that everyone loves him and enjoys watching him eat sandwiches". He has two followers, Ciccio and Guido, who are ready to do his bidding. Voicing him, Raimondo was partly inspired by Giuseppe Anatrelli's performance as Luciano Calboni in the Fantozzi film series. Raimondo reprised his role in the Italian-language dubbing of the movie.
- Maya Rudolph as Daniela Paguro, a sea monster, Lorenzo's wife, and Luca's mother who is overprotective and determined to keep her son safe.
- Marco Barricelli as Massimo Marcovaldo, an Italian fisherman, cook and Giulia's father. He is an imposing and tattooed man born with only one arm. Despite Luca and Alberto being intimidated by his big size and skill with a knife, Massimo has a soft heart, especially for his daughter.
- Jim Gaffigan as Lorenzo Paguro, a sea monster, Ugo's brother, Daniela's husband, and Luca's father, a "well-meaning, but sometimes distracted dad who's very passionate about raising his prize-winning crabs"; Gaffigan based his performance on his own parenting skills.
- Peter Sohn and Lorenzo Crisci as Ciccio and Guido, Ercole's cronies.
- Marina Massironi as Mrs. Marsigliese, a lady who runs the Portorosso Cup race and its sponsor. Massironi also performed her role in the Italian-language dubbing of the movie.
- Sandy Martin as Grandma Paguro, a sea monster who is Luca's grandmother. Grandma knows that breaking some rules is a part of growing up and she is a little too happy to look the other way if Luca's rebellious side should emerge.
- Sacha Baron Cohen as Ugo, an anglerfish-like sea monster, Luca's uncle, and Lorenzo's brother who lives in the depths of the ocean and has a see-through torso.

Additionally, Giacomo Gianniotti and Gino La Monica voice Giacomo and Tommaso respectively, two local fishermen (also performing these roles in the Italian-language dubbing of the movie). Elisa Gabrielli and Mimi Maynard play Concetta and Pinuccia Aragosta, two elderly women who are later revealed to be sea monsters. Francesca Fanti voices a police officer that gets annoyed with Ercole's antics. Jonathan Nichols voices Don Eugenio, a local priest (voiced by Gino D'Acampo in the British version). Jim Pirri voices Mr. Branzino, a sea monster who is the Paguro family's neighbor. Director Enrico Casarosa voices an angry fisherman and a Scopa player.

== Production ==
=== Development ===
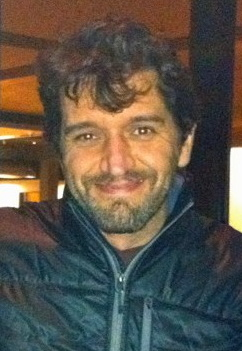
Director Enrico Casarosa stated that the film was inspired by his own childhood.

On July 30, 2020, Pixar announced a new film titled Luca as an "Italy-set coming-of-age story", with Enrico Casarosa directing and Andrea Warren producing. It is the feature-length directorial debut of Casarosa, who has previously directed the 2011 Academy Award-nominated short film La Luna. It is the first Pixar film to be made almost exclusively at crew members' homes because of the closing of Pixar campus in Emeryville, California, due to the COVID-19 pandemic. However, Casarosa stated it took five years to complete the development of Luca.

Casarosa has described Luca as a "deeply personal story", being inspired by his childhood in Genoa, Italy, with the title character based on himself and Alberto on his best friend Alberto Surace (who voices a fisherman in the Italian dub version). Casarosa has stated: "my summers were spent on beaches ... I met my best friend when I was 11. I was really shy and I found this troublemaker of a kid who had a completely different life. I wanted to make a movie about those kinds of friendships that help you grow up."

He also stated that the film's core is a celebration of friendship:

Childhood friendships often set the course of who we want to become, and it is those bonds that are at the heart of our story in Luca. So, in addition to the beauty and charm of the Italian seaside, our film will feature an unforgettable summer adventure that will fundamentally change Luca.

According to Casarosa, the result is a film that "pays homage to Federico Fellini and other classic Italian filmmakers, with a dash of Miyazaki in the mix too". In addition of Fellini and Miyazaki's works, the films La Terra Trema (1948), Stromboli (1950) and Stand by Me (1986) were also cited as source of inspiration, and Aardman Animations and Wes Anderson's stop-motion films influenced Casarosa's artistic sensibilities.

During earlier drafts of the film, Casarosa stated that the chief creative officer of Pixar at the time, John Lasseter, pushed for the film to be bigger scaled which included a climax where the town of Portorosso was threatened by a giant kraken. Casarosa stated that Lasseter "had great instincts but it was a little more dogmatic". After Lasseter departed Pixar in 2018, Casarosa was allowed and encouraged to pursue the smaller intimate film he wanted to make as well as experiment with the animation by Lasseter's replacement and the film's executive producer, Pete Docter. The approach of using more personable stories for the film due to Docter's oversight shifted the direction that the studio took with both storytelling and film production.

To prepare for the film, Pixar sent several of the film's artists to the Italian Riviera for a research trip, during which they took photos of the area's landscape and peoples. The film is rooted in the 50s and 60s, that Casarosa has described as a "golden age that feels timeless", with the music and designs inspired from that period "to capture a little bit of this timelessness of summer."

The sea monsters featured in the film were pulled from Italian myths and regional folklore, including the Tellaro octopus and local "little legends about sea dragons, creatures that either come to help or get into trouble". Casarosa said: "I always found the old sea monsters on maps really fascinating. The mystery of the sea was so represented in the weird creatures that we used to draw. And that area has a lot of wonderful myths". Production designer Daniela Strijleva stated: "We were really inspired by old sea maps. Some design details that carried through to the final film are things like the shapes of the fins of the sea monsters, how decorative their scales are, and the curves of their tails." Casarosa also stated that the sea monster is a "metaphor for feeling different".

Disney filed for copyright registry of the names "Portorosso" and "Isola del mare" ("Sea island"). In the final film, Luca's surname is Paguro (Italian for "Hermit crab"), while Portorosso is the name of the village in which the film is set.

=== Animation and design ===
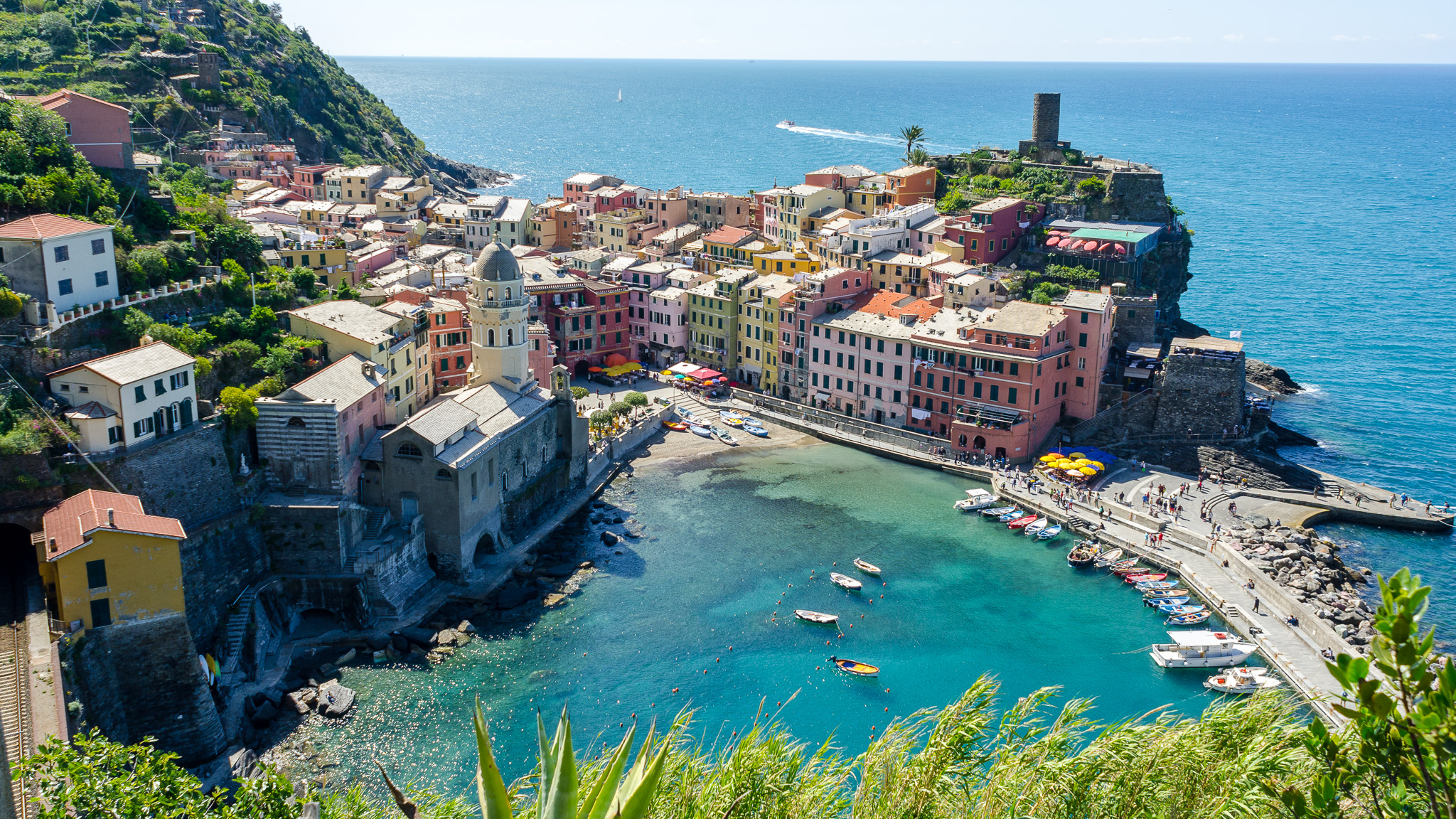
Pixar's artists embarked on research trips to the Italian Riviera to prepare the setting of the film (Vernazza pictured).

To create the setting of the movie, Portorosso, the studio sent several of the film's artists to the Italian Riviera for a research trip, including on the Cinque Terre, during which they took photos of the area's landscape and peoples. During the research trip, Deanna Marsigliese, the film's art director, noted that they were watched by curious onlookers and chose to incorporate that into the character designs. Isola del mare is inspired by the Italian island Tino.

According to production designer Daniela Strijleva, it took a year to design Luca because they wanted to get to know him: "Enrico always wanted Luca to be a bit of an introvert and someone who was curious, but it took us a bit longer to figure out that Luca is a dreamer. He has a strong imagination and a really evolved inner life. That's when the character came to life for me." A clay figure of sea monster Luca was sculpted to assist with the design process for the character.

Casarosa described the characters' transformation scenes as "a big effort" due to the many iterations done. He also stated that another big effort was finding a different look: "So, you're using the same tools roughly and you're not completely reinventing, but you're trying to bring some warmth, some texture, some imperfection. The computer naturally kind of wants to be a little bit realistic and perfect. So, for me, it was like, why don't we bring some painterly vibes to our pictures? How do we bring texture so that it's a little more imperfect? And watercolor paper. I love to draw and I love to see the hand of the artist showing through and being a little bit expressive – in the world, because we were also wanting to take people to [see] Italy in this wonderfully enhanced and stylized way, but also in performances and the characters, wanting to make them feel a little bit handmade".

Animation supervisor Mike Venturini stated: "Enrico, as a director and as an artist, was inspired in his youth largely by Miyazaki's film library, starting with one of his first projects ... Future Boy Conan. That was one of Enrico's favorite things as a kid. So, initially, we watched a lot of episodes of that show. And they use a multi-limb style; it's boys being silly with a really broad physicality. He really liked that and hoped we could be influenced by that in some way. Then we kind of expanded our universe into the rest of Miyazaki's film library, which a lot of the animators on the show were already familiar with. So, on a larger feature film scale, we were looking at what were some of Miyazaki's characteristics. That's what inspired us to try things." In addition of Miyazaki's works, Casarosa stated that Aardman and Anderson's stop-motion movies also influenced his artistic sensibilities: "Some of that ends up in my drawings, that sketchy and expressive style. We wanted to bring that to the film because it felt like this is a kid's world. This is a playful world. And it felt true to the story to go in that direction. I love the immersion of 3D, but I sometimes I feel it can go towards coldness. So, I wanted to bring the warmth of imperfection. That's why some of the silly drawings made us laugh when we started boarding them and then put them on a screen."

Casarosa and the team began testing new animation concepts, hoping to bring playful silliness to the characters by taking away some of the typically large amount of detail. Areas of immediate focus were using a more 2D pose style, wider mouths with rounded, rather than angled corners, and multi-limb motions that brought a sillier feel to character movement. Referring to the multi-limb motion, Casarosa said: "It's an old-fashion cartoon technique in some ways ... It came out of the drawings, the essence of someone running extremely fast. We wanted to use the multi-limb technique in areas of the film where the characters were doing extreme physicality, where it would add to the personality of the silliness of the moment. There were only so many chances to use it. I wish there were more. But it was so much fun to use it when we could."

=== Writing ===
On July 30, 2020, Jones announced that he would co-write the screenplay with Andrews, and that he was proud of it.

It is the first Pixar film to involve Andrews, while Jones had previously co-written Soul (2020) and is also credited as a Senior Story and Creative Artist at the studio.

Jones stated: "To force a writing partnership is not an easy thing. Jesse and I ended up having a really great meeting of the minds about what we really wanted to say with this movie. Jesse had been on it for two years before me. He had really put in the time. This is about the greatest summer in these two boys' lives and Jesse's voice with both of those boys was just so wonderful and hilarious and special and emotional. I felt in many ways that I'm just helping Jesse 'plus' that by trying to kind of apply a little bit more of story foundation."

=== Casting ===
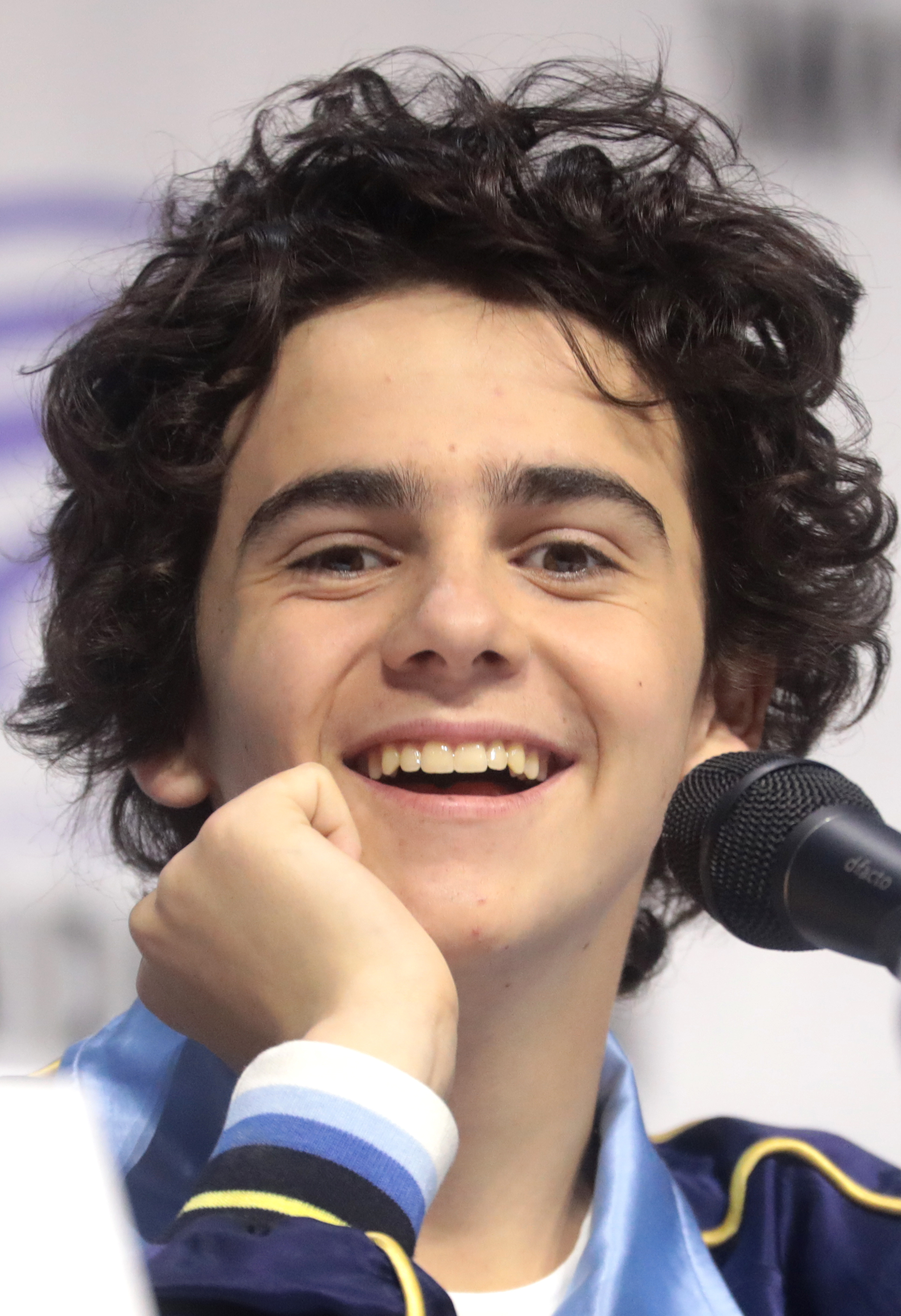
Jack Dylan Grazer voices Alberto Scorfano.

On February 25, 2021, with the release of the teaser trailer and poster, Tremblay, Grazer, Berman, Rudolph, Barricelli, Raimondo and Gaffigan were announced as part of the cast. Martin and Gianniotti were announced on April 28 after the official trailer and poster were released.

Tremblay voices the title character; Casarosa stated that working with him was "such a pleasure", and "I love how earnest and innocent he is naturally. And he's playful and he's not afraid to try stuff so it was so much fun to improvise with him ... he's actually one of the few actors we had time to work with before the pandemic, so there it was so much fun." According to Tremblay: "[Luca] really wants to explore the world and I can really relate to that, especially now. I really want to get back out there and just learn about different cultures, just like Luca. He really wants to go to this town in Italy and learn about their culture and become part of it."

Casarosa stated that Grazer, who voiced Alberto, brings "a natural confidence and vulnerability" to the character, "who's a free-spirited teen sea monster with unbridled enthusiasm for the human world." Giulia, an "outsider, misfit girl", is voiced by newcomer Berman. Rudolph and Gaffigan, playing Daniela and Lorenzo, did get the chance to improvise, with Casarosa highlighting the depth and warmth they bring to the roles: "She's a stern mother. She's a difficult and very controlling mother, but there's this other warmth to her that balances it."

Luca's supporting cast includes actual Italian actors: Raimondo voices Ercole; Barricelli, who has a "booming voice", voices Massimo; Gianniotti voices Giacomo; Lorenzo Crisci voices Guido; Massironi voices Mrs. Marsigliese; Gino La Monica voices Tommaso; and Francesca Fanti voices a cop.

Raimondo was chosen by Casarosa after seeing his Netflix stand-up comedy show Saverio Raimondo: Il satiro parlante. Raimondo compared Ercole to the character Odd Henderson from the short story The Thanksgiving Visitor, and voicing him he was inspired by Giuseppe Anatrelli's performance as Luciano Calboni from the Fantozzi film series.

Tremblay stated that the relationship between Luca and Alberto "is gonna bring back a lot of memories when people watch this and I'm hoping that when people watch this, they'll be able to forget about COVID [...] It's so cool I get to be part of someone else's childhood. I think especially now the story is really special because, for me, I haven't really been able to see my friends because of COVID, of course, and this movie is all about friendship. So, when people see it in theaters, I hope they'll be able to remember hanging out with friends during summer vacation and just having a blast."

=== Themes and inspirations ===
Casarosa stated that the movie is a celebration of friendship, and "a love letter to the summers of our youth – those formative years when you're finding yourself", inspired by his childhood in Genoa. Casarosa based the title character on himself, while Alberto is based on his best friend, Alberto Surace, to whom the film is dedicated and who also voices a fisherman in the Italian dub. Casarosa stated: "My best friend Alberto was a bit of a troublemaker, [while] I was very timid and had a bit of a sheltered life — we couldn't have been more different ... Alberto pushed me out of my comfort zone, and pushed me off many cliffs, metaphorically and not. I probably would not be here if I didn't learn to chase my dreams from him. It's these types of deep friendships that I wanted to talk about in Luca, and that is what's at the heart of this film."

The sea monsters, based on old Italian myths and regional folklore, were defined by Casarosa as a "metaphor for feeling different", explaining: "We were also a bit of 'outsiders', so it felt right to use sea monsters to express the idea that we felt a little different and not cool as kids". Casarosa stated: "I always found the old sea monsters on maps really fascinating. The mystery of the sea was so represented in the weird creatures that we used to draw. And that area has a lot of wonderful myths". Producer Andrea Warren expanded: "We always liked the idea that the metaphor of being a sea monster can apply to so many different things. There is a theme of openness, showing oneself and self-acceptance, as well as community acceptance. Confronting the idea that there's more to sea monsters than they realized. You know that they've only seen it through one perspective, one lens, and so I think that that's a wonderful theme in the film, which is that those ideas weren't right and that there's more to learn." Casarosa agreed: "We hope that 'sea monster' could be a metaphor for all [manners] of feeling different — like being a teen or even pre-teen — any moment where you feel odd. It felt like a wonderful way to talk about that and having to accept ourselves first, whatever way we feel different."

Some have seen Luca and Alberto hiding their true sea monster identities as an allegory for people who are members of the LGBTQ+ community, feeling as though they need to hide their true selves in order to be accepted. Casarosa said this was unintentional and that his original vision for the film was to explore the time in a child's life before romance, while stating "but it is a kind of love, right? There's a lot of hugging and it's physical and my experience as a straight man certainly wasn't that." He has welcomed the interpretation after the film's release, also stating: "While I identify with pronouns he/him and I am a straight man, the themes of diversity, acceptance and inclusion in our movie are dear to my heart".

Casarosa has stated that some people have interpreted the story as being a metaphor for refugees and immigrants as well. While he stated that this was unintentional too, he was welcome to all interpretations: "We were aware making the movie that this was a wonderful journey of owning your own identity, and coming out with it – whichever that identity is. I thought that everyone would bring their own identity to it."

Casarosa later stated that the film was intended to be a metaphor for race and while romance was briefly discussed, it was never meant to be a focal point to the story; "some people seem to get mad that I'm not saying yes or no, but I feel like, well, this is a movie about being open to any difference."

== Music ==
On April 1, 2021, Dan Romer was revealed to be the film's composer. Romer was influenced by Italian and folk-pop music genre from the 1950s and 1960s, while scoring for the film, and a wide range of instruments were used while recording the score. It was composed during July 2020 and recorded mid-March 2021, adhering to strict safety guidelines during the COVID-19 pandemic restrictions. The film features songs by Mina, Edoardo Bennato, Gianni Morandi, Rita Pavone and Quartetto Cetra, and excerpts from operas by Giacomo Puccini and Gioachino Rossini. The soundtrack album was released by Walt Disney Records on June 18, 2021.

== Marketing ==
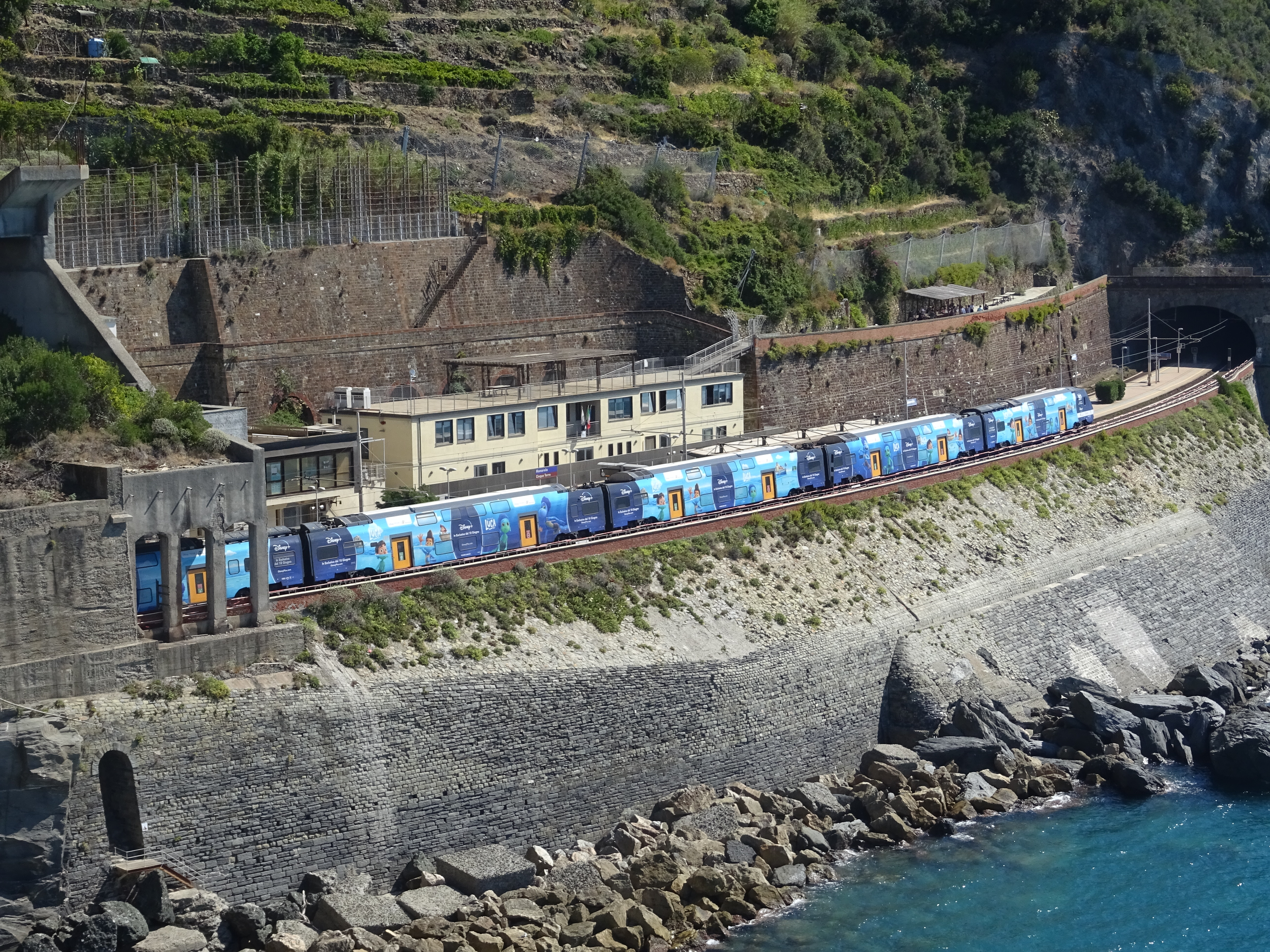
Advertisement for the film on a Caravaggio train in Manarola

In November 2020, some concept art of the film and the clay figure of sea monster Luca were shown in the second episode of Inside Pixar. In December 2020, an early look to the film was screened at Disney Investor Day, and the clips and some screenshots were later leaked online. On January 18, 2021, the first official image from the film was released by Empire. On January 19, a promotional still was released on the cover of Italian magazine Il Venerdì di Repubblica, featuring Luca, Alberto, and Giulia on a Vespa in one of the scenic backdrops from the film.

A series of books based on the film was published on May 14, 2021. Funko produced a line of Funko Pops based on the characters of the film. A line of action figures and toy packs by Mattel was released on July 1, 2021. In June 2021, Trenitalia unveiled their Luca-themed livery for a Caravaggio train.

To promote the film's release, McDonald's launched its promotional campaign by including one of eight bathtub toys free with the purchase of a Happy Meal.

A month after the release of the film, the world builder video game Disney Magic Kingdoms included a limited time "Luca Event", including Luca, Alberto, Giulia, Ercole and Machiavelli as playable characters, in addition to attractions based on locations of the film.

=== Theme park attractions ===
A dining area themed to Luca opened at the Pizzeria Bella Notte restaurant in Fantasyland at Disneyland Park Paris.

== Release ==
=== Theatrical and streaming ===
Luca had its premiere on June 13, 2021, in Italy at the Aquarium of Genoa, with a three-day run by the non-profit organization MediCinema to raise funds for the Istituto Giannina Gaslini and other entities in the Ligurian territory. The film was originally set to be theatrically released in the United States on June 18, 2021, by Walt Disney Studios Motion Pictures. However, on March 23, 2021, Disney announced the cancellation of the film's theatrical release, and it instead was released worldwide on Disney+ in response to the COVID-19 pandemic, on the same date. The film also played a one-week theatrical engagement at Hollywood's El Capitan Theatre from June 18–24, 2021. In international markets where Disney+ is not available, it was released theatrically. On December 5, 2023, it was announced that Luca, as well as Soul (2020) and Turning Red (2022), would be released in theaters in the United States throughout early 2024, with Luca being released on March 22, 2024, accompanied by the short film For the Birds. (Note: For the Birds was previously shown with Monsters, Inc.)

=== Home media ===
Following an announcement on July 1, 2021, Walt Disney Studios Home Entertainment released Luca on Ultra HD Blu-ray, Blu-ray, DVD and Digital on August 3, 2021, in the United States, and August 23, 2021, in the United Kingdom.

== Reception ==
=== Viewership ===
Nielsen Media Research, which records streaming viewership on some U.S. television screens, reported that following its opening weekend, Luca topped all original movies in its first days on streaming, with 1.573 billion minutes of viewing time. Nielsen reported that the movie topped the weekly streaming Top 10 list for the June 14–20 week, and ranking at No. 2 on the overall streaming rankings after the TV series Manifest on Netflix. The film continued to play well in subsequent weeks, logging 1.15 billion minutes of viewership between July 21–27 (equal to about 1.2 million total watches), the second-most for an original film behind The Tomorrow War. Luca was the most-watched streaming film of 2021, with over 10.6 billion minutes viewed. In 2025, Nielsen reported that Luca had accumulated 10.2 billion minutes of watch time between 2020 and 2025, ranking No. 7 among the most-streamed films during that time frame.

=== Box office ===
By December 2021, the film had grossed $51.1 million worldwide, with its largest markets being China ($14 million), Russia ($8.2 million), Poland ($3.6 million), Hong Kong ($3.6 million), South Korea ($3 million), the United Arab Emirates ($2.1 million), and Romania ($1.02 million) in its international release and United States ($1.3 million), Mexico ($307,884), Australia ($63,292) and Spain ($34,474) in the 2024 re-release.

=== Critical response ===
On the review aggregator website Rotten Tomatoes, the film holds an approval rating of 91% based on 308 reviews, with an average rating of 7.3/10. The website's critics consensus reads, "Slight but suffused with infectious joy, the beguiling Luca proves Pixar can play it safe while still charming audiences of all ages." Metacritic, which uses a weighted average, assigned the film a score of 71 out of 100 based on 52 critics, indicating "generally favorable" reviews.

Alonso Duralde of the TheWrap wrote: "Luca is sweet and affecting, capturing the bond that strangers can build over a summer, and how that friendship can endure. And like its shape-shifting protagonists, it's got plenty going on beneath the surface." From The Hollywood Reporter, David Rooney said that "the real magic of Luca is its visuals. The character designs are appealing both in the marine world and on land, and the richness of the settings in both realms is a constant source of pleasure. The play of light on the gloriously blue water's surface is almost photorealistic at times, while a sunset spreading its orange glow over rocks on the shoreline makes you yearn to be there."

Charlie Ridgely, writing for ComicBook.com praised the film for its uniqueness, saying that it highly deviated from Pixar's usual narrative formula and clichés, but that this didn't make it "lesser" than the company's classics like Toy Story and Up. He also praised the animation, the design of the Italian Riviera, the score and the story.

Conversely, Phil De Semlyen, writing for Time Out, branded the film a "letdown", writing "Charming but slight, Luca definitely isn't Pixar firing on all cylinders. The studio's trademark daring, pin sharp sight gags, and big ideas are missing from a fishy coming-of-age yarn that's a little damp around the edges."

=== Accolades ===
Accolades received by Luca (2021 film)
Award	Date of ceremony	Category	Recipient(s)	Result	Ref.
Academy Awards	March 27, 2022	Best Animated Feature	Enrico Casarosa, Andrea Warren	Nominated	
American Cinema Editors Awards	March 5, 2022	Best Edited Animated Feature Film	Catherine Apple, Jason Hudak	Nominated	
ADG Excellence in Production Design Awards	March 5, 2022	Excellence in Production Design for an Animated Film	Daniela Strijleva	Nominated	
Alliance of Women Film Journalists	January 25, 2022	Best Animated Film	Luca	Nominated	
Alliance of Women Film Journalists	January 25, 2022	Best Animated Female	Emma Berman	Nominated	
Annie Awards	March 12, 2022	Best Animated Feature	Luca	Nominated	
Annie Awards	March 12, 2022	Best Character Animation – Feature	Tarun Lak	Nominated	
Annie Awards	March 12, 2022	Best Character Design – Feature	Deanna Marsigliese	Nominated	
Annie Awards	March 12, 2022	Best Direction – Feature	Enrico Casarosa	Nominated	
Annie Awards	March 12, 2022	Best Music – Feature	Dan Romer	Nominated	
Annie Awards	March 12, 2022	Best Voice Acting – Feature	Jack Dylan Grazer	Nominated	
Annie Awards	March 12, 2022	Best Writing – Feature	Jesse Andrews, Mike Jones	Nominated	
Annie Awards	March 12, 2022	Best Editorial – Feature	Catherine Apple, Jason Hudak, Jennifer Jew, Tim Fox, David Suther	Nominated	
Austin Film Critics Association	January 11, 2022	Best Animated Film	Luca	Nominated	
British Academy Film Awards	March 13, 2022	Best Animated Film	Enrico Casarosa, Andrea Warren	Nominated	
Black Reel Awards	February 27, 2022	Outstanding Voice Performance	Maya Rudolph	Nominated	
Cinema Audio Society Awards	March 19, 2022	Outstanding Achievement in Sound Mixing for a Motion Picture – Animated	Vince Caro, Christopher Scarabosio, Tony Villaflor, Greg Hayes, Jason Butler, Richard Duarte	Nominated	
Chicago Film Critics Association	December 15, 2021	Best Animated Film	Luca	Nominated	
Critics' Choice Movie Awards	March 13, 2022	Best Animated Feature	Luca	Nominated	
Dallas–Fort Worth Film Critics Association	December 20, 2021	Best Animated Film	Luca	Nominated	
Detroit Film Critics Society	January 5, 2022	Best Animated Feature	Luca	Nominated	
Florida Film Critics Circle	December 22, 2021	Best Animated Film	Luca	Nominated	
Georgia Film Critics Association	January 14, 2022	Best Animated Film	Luca	Nominated	
Golden Globe Awards	January 9, 2022	Best Animated Feature Film	Luca	Nominated	
Hollywood Critics Association	July 1, 2021	Midseason Award – Best Picture	Luca	Nominated	
Hollywood Critics Association	February 28, 2022	Best Animated Film	Luca	Nominated	
Hollywood Critics Association	February 28, 2022	Best Animated or VSX Performance	Jacob Tremblay	Nominated	
Hollywood Music in Media Awards	November 17, 2021	Original Score — Animated Film	Dan Romer	Nominated	
Houston Film Critics Society	January 19, 2022	Best Animated Feature	Luca	Nominated	
Motion Picture Sound Editors Golden Reel Awards	March 13, 2022	Outstanding Achievement in Sound Editing – Feature Animation	Chris Scarabosio, André Fenley, Rich Quinn, Ronni Brown, Justin Doyle, Pascal Garneau, E. Larry Oatfield, Jana Vance, Ronni Brown, Lodge Worster	Nominated	
NAACP Image Awards	February 26, 2022	Outstanding Animated Motion Picture	Luca	Nominated	
Nickelodeon Kids' Choice Awards	April 9, 2022	Favorite Animated Movie	Luca	Nominated	
Online Film Critics Society	January 24, 2022	Best Animated Feature	Luca	Nominated	
People's Choice Awards	December 7, 2021	Family Movie of 2021	Luca	Won	
Producers Guild of America Awards	March 19, 2022	Outstanding Producer of Animated Theatrical Motion Pictures	Andrea Warren	Nominated	
San Diego Film Critics Society	January 10, 2022	Best Animated Film	Luca	Won	
San Francisco Bay Area Film Critics Circle	January 10, 2022	Best Animated Feature	Luca	Nominated	
Satellite Awards	April 2, 2022	Best Animated or Mixed Media Film	Luca	Nominated	
Saturn Awards	October 25, 2022	Best Animated Film	Luca	Nominated	
Saturn Awards	October 25, 2022	Best Performance by a Younger Actor	Jacob Tremblay	Nominated	
Seattle Film Critics Society	January 17, 2022	Best Animated Feature	Luca	Nominated	
St. Louis Film Critics Association	December 19, 2021	Best Animated Film	Luca	Nominated	
Visual Effects Society Awards	March 8, 2022	Outstanding Visual Effects in an Animated Feature	Enrico Casarosa, Andrea Warren, David Ryu, Jon Reisch	Nominated	
Visual Effects Society Awards	March 8, 2022	Outstanding Animated Character in an Animated Feature	Gwendelyn Enderoglu, Laurie Nguyen Kim, Tanja Krampfert, Maria Lee (for Luca)	Nominated	
Visual Effects Society Awards	March 8, 2022	Outstanding Created Environment in an Animated Feature	Airton Dittz, Jr., Jack Hattori, Michael Rutter, Joshua West (for Portorosso Piazza)	Nominated	
Visual Effects Society Awards	March 8, 2022	Outstanding Effects Simulations in an Animated Feature	Amit Baadkar, Greg Gladstone, Emron Grover, Tim Speltz	Nominated	
Washington D.C. Area Film Critics Association	December 6, 2021	Best Animated Film	Luca	Nominated	
Washington D.C. Area Film Critics Association	December 6, 2021	Best Voice Performance	Jacob Tremblay	Nominated	

== Short film ==
A short film titled Ciao Alberto was released on Disney+ on November 12, 2021. It was written and directed by Kenna Harris and produced by Matt DeMartini, with Enrico Casarosa as executive producer. It focuses on Alberto as he continues to grow accustomed to working with Massimo; eventually accepting him as a father figure.

== Possible sequel ==
The cast expressed interest in returning for a sequel, and presented different ideas of what it would be about, among which was the joking suggestion they frequently made of giving Uncle Ugo a spin-off series. Casarosa expressed interest in doing a sequel that would be similar to The Parent Trap (1961), which would center upon Luca and Giulia's attempt to reunite Massimo and his wife. In October 2022, Casarosa stated that there were no present plans for a sequel to Luca, but that he was developing a new, original film, later revealed to be Gatto (2027).
