= Jenny Owen Youngs =

American singer and songwriter

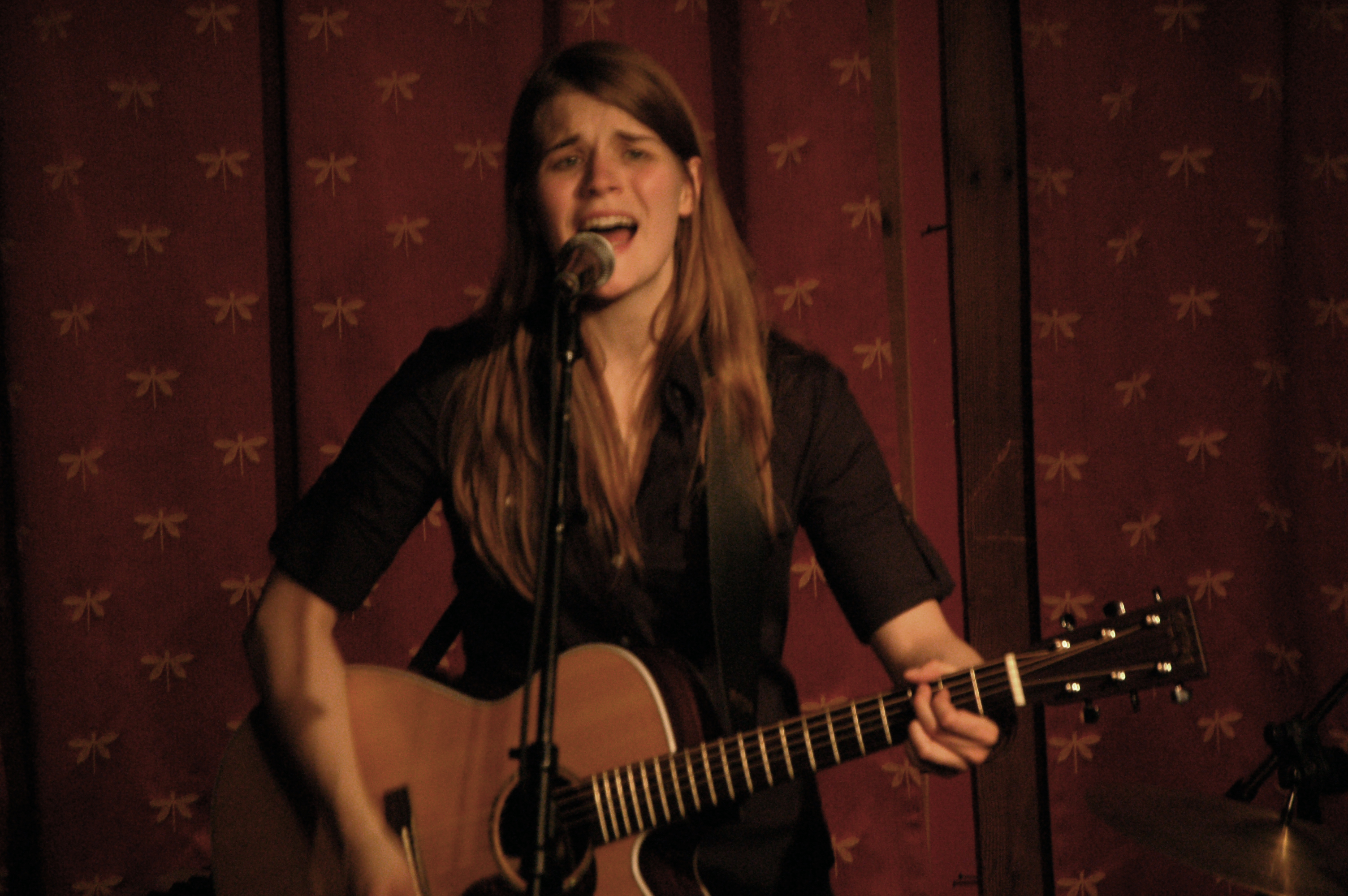
- Youngs performing in Portland, Oregon's Mississippi Studios

Background information
- Born: November 22, 1981 (age 44)
- Origin: Newton, New Jersey, US
- Genres: Indie pop, alternative, indie folk
- Occupation: Singer-songwriter
- Instruments: Vocals, guitar, bass, flute, tuba
- Years active: 2005–present
- Label: Nettwerk
- Spouse(s): Kristin Russo (m. 2013; div. 2018) Jess Abbott (m. 2021)

Jenny Owen Youngs (born November 22, 1981) is an American singer-songwriter. She has released four albums and a handful of EPs both independently and via Nettwerk Records, and has toured worldwide. Youngs is also a songwriting collaborator whose cuts include the 2018 Panic! at the Disco single "High Hopes," as well as songs with Brett Dennen, Ingrid Michaelson, Shungudzo, Pitbull, and others.

Youngs' songs have been used in TV shows such as Weeds, Grey's Anatomy, Nurse Jackie, Suburgatory, and Switched at Birth. In 2017, her 2012 song "Wake Up" was featured over the end credits of BoJack Horseman's season 4 finale. On March 28, 2018, it was announced that Youngs would work as the composer for Muscle Memory, a short film directed by Carly Usdin being made as a part of the American Film Institute's Directing Workshop for Women. In 2018, she provided her voice in “Oh The Bliss” by Dan Romer, in the album for Far Cry 5.

== Early life and education ==
Youngs was born in a hospital elevator. Raised in Newton, New Jersey, Youngs grew up playing the flute, the french horn and the sousaphone in elementary school and the tuba in junior high school. At age 14, her older step-brother told her that if she wanted to be in a band she needed to learn how to play the guitar. She attended Kittatinny Regional High School and graduated from State University of New York at Purchase with a degree in studio composition.

== Music career ==
=== As a solo artist ===
==== Batten the Hatches ====
Youngs' first album Batten the Hatches was recorded with borrowed equipment at SUNY-Purchase and self-released in 2005. While at Austin's South by Southwest, Youngs met Gary Calamar, the music supervisor of Showtime's Weeds, which led to her song "Fuck Was I" appearing in Weeds' second-season premiere. The notoriety resulted in a contract with Canadian indie label Nettwerk Records. Nettwerk Records re-released her album Batten the Hatches on April 10, 2007, with new artwork and an additional song ("Drinking Song"). Newsweek called the album a top pick, complimenting Youngs' "simple, stripped-down guitar" and her "edgy lyrics and sweetly sung melodies". The Sydney Morning Herald described the album as an "accomplished debut".

"Fuck Was I" was also released on Weeds: Music from the Original Series, Vol. 2.

==== Transmitter Failure ====
Youngs released her second album, Transmitter Failure, on May 26, 2009. She supported Regina Spektor in her 2009 tour promoting the album Far.

Youngs collaborated with Xian Hawkins under the moniker Bell Horses, which resulted in the album This Loves Last Time (2009). In the fall of 2009, Youngs performed alongside Chuck Ragan, Jim Ward, Tim Barry, Joey Cape, Dave Hause, Frank Turner, and others as part of the 2009 Revival Tour.

==== An Unwavering Band of Light ====
On July 1, 2010, Youngs launched a Kickstarter campaign to fund her third album and reached her goal of $20,000 in 28 hours. Her drummer, Elliot Jacobson, had his chest waxed as an incentive to reach the goal. The campaign ended on August 13, 2010, with a total of $38,543 and 646 backers. On February 7, 2012, the Kickstarter-backed third studio album, titled An Unwavering Band of Light was released. In 2017, a song from that album, "Wake Up", appeared over the end titles of the Season Four finale of Netflix's Bojack Horseman.

==== OFFAIR: From The Forest Floor ====
The 12-track album cycles through a 24-hour period, beginning at 7am. Each piece is designed to reflect aspects of the time it's representing, from sunrise to dusk, moonset to blue hour. The earthy, hypnotic project features collaborators John Mark Nelson, Hrishikesh Hirway, and Jess Abbott (solo as Tancred).

==== Side projects, touring, and other releases ====
On April 5, 2018, Youngs released the song "Won't Let Go of Me" which was featured in the Grey's Anatomy episode "Hold Back The River" (Season 14, Episode 18). The song was written by Aaron Espe and Kyle Neal. Neal produced the song while Espe was credited as a co-producer.

On March 28, 2018, it was announced that Youngs would work as the composer for Muscle Memory, a short film directed by Carly Usdin being made as a part of the American Film Institute's Directing Workshop for Women.

Youngs has toured worldwide headlining and also supporting artists such as Regina Spektor, Against Me!, Frank Turner, and Streetlight Manifesto.

In January 2013, she was announced to rejoin The Revival Tour, where she performed alongside Chuck Ragan, Rocky Votolato, Dave Hause, Jenny O., and Tim McIlrath of Rise Against.

In December 2012, Youngs began her Exhibit project in which she visited a New York City museum once a week, recording a song inspired by her visit within the same week. The album was released on Bandcamp and consists of 8 tracks.

Youngs covered "Have You Forgotten" by Red House Painters for American Laundromat Records's charity CD "Sing Me To Sleep – Indie Lullabies" released in Spring 2010. In March 2010, Youngs toured with Bess Rogers and A.W. on their 'Spring Break Forever Tour', after which she flew out to the United Kingdom to support Motion City Soundtrack on their London, Manchester, Birmingham, and Glasgow tour. She headlined a show at "Monto Water Rats" in London in April 2010.

In addition to her solo career, Youngs was a member of the band The Robot Explosion, a side project with fellow musicians and friends Bess Rogers, Andrew Futral, and Saul Simon-MacWilliams.

Youngs has toured with Vienna Teng, opening for the singer on the Green Caravan Tour, and opened for Aimee Mann at London's indigO2 on July 27, 2007. Youngs toured with Glen Phillips of Toad the Wet Sprocket in August 2007, and with Sean Hayes, with whom she co-headlined. She played in Belgium, Netherlands, Norway, and Sweden in November and December 2007.

=== Co-writing and recent years ===
In 2015, Youngs moved to Los Angeles where she is working on her next album and co-writing with and for other artists. Youngs' notable cuts include Panic! at the Disco's 2018 single "High Hopes", the 2018 song from the Fifty Shades Freed soundtrack, "Come On Back", which she co-wrote with Shungudzo and producer Jordan Palmer and appeared in both the film and on the soundtrack, "Miss America", which she co-wrote with Ingrid Michaelson and others for Michaelson's 2016 album It Doesn't Have to Make Sense, and Pitbull's 2016 single "Bad Man", which was debuted at the 58th Annual Grammy Awards. She also worked closely with Brett Dennen and Dan Wilson to write three of the five songs on Dennen's 2018 EP, Let's... including the title track. Youngs often collaborates with her friends Chris Farren and A.W.

== Buffering the Vampire Slayer ==
In September 2016, Youngs launched the podcast Buffering the Vampire Slayer with Kristin Russo. The podcast discusses the popular television series Buffy the Vampire Slayer one episode at a time, and each episode ends with an original recap song about the episode, penned by Youngs and Russo. The podcast is part of the Stitcher Premium network and has been featured in A.V. Club, Entertainment Weekly, Autostraddle, and Buzzfeed.

== Veronica Mars Investigations ==
In August 2019, Youngs launched the podcast Veronica Mars Investigations with Helen Zaltzman. The podcast discusses the popular television series Veronica Mars one episode at a time.

== Personal life ==
On June 12, 2013, Youngs came out, announcing "I am super gay", and that she was engaged to marry her girlfriend Kristin Russo, whom she married on August 25, 2013. On May 25, 2018, the couple announced they are no longer together but remain friends and will keep working on their mutual projects. Both of them said, "We've come to realize that we will be better—both to ourselves and to each other—within the context of a friendship, rather than a marriage."

On May 3, 2020, Youngs announced her engagement to Jess Abbott of Tancred on Twitter.

== Discography ==
=== Albums ===
Jenny Owen Youngs albums
Year	Album details
2005 (re-released 2007)	Batten the Hatches: Released: Label: self-released (re-released by Nettwerk); Format: CD
2009	Transmitter Failure: Released: May 26, 2009; Label: Nettwerk; Format: CD
2012	An Unwavering Band of Light: Released: February 7, 2012; Label: self-released; Format: CD, LP
2023	Avalanche: Released: September 22, 2023; Label: Yep Roc Records; Format: CD, LP
2024	OFFAIR: From The Forest Floor: Released: February, 2024; Label: OFFAIR Records; Format: LP

=== Singles ===
- "Split" with Dave House (UK vinyl 12" single released April 2007), Gravity DIP Records
- "Fuck Was I" (UK single released May 2007), Nettwerk Music Group
- "Things We Don't Need Anymore" (digital single), Nettwerk Music Group
- "Great Big Plans" (digital single, June 2011)
- "Jenny Owen Youngs and A.W. Sing the Magnetic Fields" (vinyl 7" single, September 2013), Asbestos Records

=== EPs ===
- The Take Off All Your Clothes EP March 12, 2007
- Led to the Sea EP April 7, 2009
- Last Person EP March 23, 2010
- Jukebox the Ghost + Jenny Owen Youngs split EP July 30, 2013
- Slack Tide February 17, 2015
- Night Shift November 15, 2019
- Echo Mountain March 10, 2021
- It's Dangerous to Go Alone June 10, 2022

=== Compilations ===
Song	Album	Release date
"Not On Your Own"	The Gayest Compilation Ever Made Volume II	January 14. 2014

=== Co-writing credits ===
Year	Artist	Album	Song
2015	A.W.	New Love (SideOneDummy Records)	"Good Way"
2015	A.W.	New Love (SideOneDummy Records)	"Golden Coast"
2016	Zach Jones & The Tricky Bits	Rendezvous with a Comet	"Mushroom Suit"
2016	Ingrid Michaelson	It Doesn't Have to Make Sense (Cabin 24 Records / Mom + Pop Music)	"Miss America"
2017	Bo Talks ft. Sarah Hyland	Know U Anymore – Single (Proximity / Geffen)	"Know U Anymore"
2017	Ingrid Michaelson ft. Sara Bareilles	Alter Egos (Cabin 24 Records)	"Miss America"
2017	Jasmine Murray	Jasmine Murray (Fair Trade / Columbia)	"Into Words"
2017	Pitbull ft. Robin Thicke, Joe Perry, and Travis Barker	Climate Change (RCA Records)	"Bad Man"
2018	Brett Dennen	Here's Looking at You Kid EP (Downtown Records)	"People I Love"
2018	Panic! at the Disco	Pray for the Wicked (Fueled By Ramen / DCD2 Records)	"High Hopes"
2018	Panic! at the Disco	Pray for the Wicked (Fueled By Ramen / DCD2 Records)	"Roaring 20s"
2018	Brett Dennen	Let's... EP (Downtown Records)	"Let's..."
2018	Brett Dennen	Let's... EP (Downtown Records)	"Home Away From Home"
2018	Brett Dennen	Let's... EP (Downtown Records)	"Jenny and Jill"
2018	Ashley Campbell	The Lonely One	"Wish I Wanted To"
2018	Shungudzo	Fifty Shades Freed Soundtrack (Universal / Republic)	"Come On Back"
2020	Semisonic	You're Not Alone EP	"Basement Tapes"
