= Kenna Harris =

American filmmaker

- Born: McKenna Jean Harris; July 14, 1994 (age 32); Valencia, California, U.S.
- Education: CalArts
- Occupations: Filmmaker; Storyboard artist
- Years active: 2015−present
- Employers: Cartoon Network (2015–2016); Walt Disney Animation Studios (2016–2021); Pixar Animation Studios (2021–present)

Kenna Harris (born July 14, 1994) is an American filmmaker and storyboard artist. They are best known for their work at Pixar, including directing the short film Ciao Alberto (2021) and co-director of the feature film Toy Story 5 (2026).

== Early life ==
Harris was born in Valencia, California. By 2014, they graduated from CalArts.

== Career ==
In 2015, they began their career as a character designer on the Cartoon Network series We Bare Bears (2015–16). In 2016, they joined Walt Disney Animation Studios as a storyboard artist where they worked on Ralph Breaks the Internet (2018), Frozen 2 (2019), and Raya and the Last Dragon (2021). In 2021, they transitioned to Pixar Animation Studios where they served as a storyboard artist on Luca (2021), directed and wrote the short film Ciao Alberto (2021), and associate executive produced Elemental (2023). In August 2024, they were announced to be making their feature directorial debut as co-director of Toy Story 5 (2026).

== Personal life ==
Harris is non-binary.

== Filmography ==
=== Feature films ===
Year	Title	Director	Writer	Story Artist	Other	Notes/Ref(s)
2018	Ralph Breaks the Internet	No	No	Yes	No	
2019	Frozen 2	No	No	Story Apprentice	No	
2021	Raya and the Last Dragon	No	No	Yes	No	
2021	Luca	No	No	Story Lead	No	
2023	Elemental	No	No	No	Yes	Associate Executive Producer
2024	Inside Out 2	No	No	Story Supervisor	No	
2025	Elio	No	No	No	Yes	Pixar Senior Creative Team
2026	Hoppers	No	No	No	Yes	Pixar Senior Creative Team
2026	Toy Story 5	Co-Director	Yes	No	Yes	Pixar Senior Creative Team

=== Short films ===
Year	Title	Director	Writer	Other	Notes/Ref(s)
2021	Twenty Something	No	No	Yes	Story Trust Member
2021	Nona	No	No	Yes	Special Thanks
2021	Ciao Alberto	Yes	Yes	No	

=== Television ===
Year	Title	Notes/Ref(s)
2015–16	We Bare Bears	Character Designer; 41 episodes
2024	Dream Productions	Pixar Senior Creative Team

== Accolades ==
Accolades received by McKenna Harris
Award	Date	Category	Nominated work	Result	Ref(s)
Astra Midseason Movie Awards	June 30, 2026	Best Screenplay	Toy Story 5	Nominated	
Children's and Family Emmy Awards	December 10, 2022	Outstanding Short Form Program	Ciao Alberto	Nominated	
Children's and Family Emmy Awards	December 10, 2022	Outstanding Directing for an Animated Program	Ciao Alberto	Nominated	
