= La Luna (2011 film) =

American short film by Enrico Casarosa

- iTunes poster
- Directed by: Enrico Casarosa
- Written by: Enrico Casarosa
- Produced by: Kevin Reher
- Starring: Krista Sheffler; Tony Fucile; Phil Sheridan
- Edited by: Steve Bloom
- Music by: Michael Giacchino
- Production company: Pixar Animation Studios
- Distributed by: Walt Disney Studios; Motion Pictures (Note: Distributed by Walt Disney Studios Motion Pictures through the Walt Disney Pictures banner.)
- Release dates: June 6, 2011 (Annecy); June 22, 2012 (with Brave)
- Running time: 7 minutes
- Country: United States
- Language: Limited dialogue

La Luna (Italian: [la ˈluːna], Italian for "The Moon") is a 2011 American animated short film, directed and written by Enrico Casarosa in his directorial debut. The film is loosely based on Italo Calvino's short story "The Distance of the Moon."

The short premiered on June 6, 2011 at the Annecy International Animated Film Festival in France, and it was paired with Pixar's Brave for its theatrical release on June 22, 2012, being shown before the film's beginning. La Luna was released on November 13, 2012, on the Brave DVD and Blu-ray, and on a new Pixar Short Films Collection, Volume 2, the second collection of Pixar's short films. La Luna was nominated for Best Animated Short Film at the 84th Academy Awards.

== Plot ==
A young Italian boy, Bambino, goes on a midnight boat trip with his father Papà and grandfather Nonno in Genoa, Italy. After they anchor in the middle of the sea, Nonno presents Bambino with a cap similar to the ones he and Papà wear. The two men disagree and bicker on how Bambino should wear it, with Papà pulling it low over his eyes and Nonno pushing it back on his head.

Papà sets up a long ladder for Bambino to climb so he can set an anchor tied around him on the full moon, and the three ascend to start their work of sweeping fallen stars off the lunar surface. Papà urges Bambino to use a pushbroom on the stars, while Nonno favors a besom or mop like broom with each broom resembling the two's facial hair. As they quarrel, a huge star crashes on the Moon; it is far too large for any of them to move.

Turning his cap backward, the way he wants to wear it and showing he is his own person, Bambino climbs onto the star and taps it with a hammer. It bursts apart into hundreds of smaller stars, and all three go to work sweeping them to one side, with Bambino choosing a rake to get the job done instead of either man's broom. Once the job is done, they climb down to their boat and look up at the Moon, which now displays a glowing crescent phase thanks to their efforts.

== Production ==
The plot was inspired by Casarosa's childhood and tales by Antoine de Saint-Exupéry and Italo Calvino, specifically "The Distance of the Moon" in Calvino's Cosmicomics. The style comes from Hayao Miyazaki's anime and from La Linea by the Italian cartoonist Osvaldo Cavandoli.

== Voice cast ==
- Krista Sheffler as Bambino (Boy)
- Tony Fucile as Papà (Dad)
- Phil Sheridan as Nonno (Grandpa)
