= Ciao Alberto =

2021 American animated short film

- Official release poster
- Directed by: Kenna Harris
- Screenplay by: Kenna Harris
- Story by: Matthias DeClercq; Scott Morse
- Produced by: Matt DeMartini
- Starring: Jack Dylan Grazer; Marco Barricelli; Jacob Tremblay; Gino La Monica; Arturo Sorino
- Cinematography: David Juan Bianchi; Adam Schnitzer
- Edited by: Jennifer Jew
- Music by: Dan Romer
- Production companies: Walt Disney Pictures; Pixar Animation Studios
- Distributed by: Disney+
- Release date: November 12, 2021
- Running time: 8 minutes
- Country: United States
- Language: English

Ciao Alberto is a 2021 American animated comedy short film written and directed by Kenna Harris, produced by Pixar Animation Studios, and distributed by Walt Disney Studios Motion Pictures. Set after the events of the 2021 Pixar film Luca, the short was released on November 12, 2021, on Disney+. Like the film, it received generally positive reviews from critics, with praise for its animation, humor, and emotional weight, with positive messages being well-received.

== Plot ==
After receiving a letter from Luca, who is away at school in Genova with Giulia, Alberto writes back about his life in Portorosso and working at the town fishery with Giulia's father, Massimo. Alberto has been fully accepted by the townspeople and no longer hides his identity as a sea monster. But despite his enthusiasm for his job, he has a tenuous relationship with Massimo, who barely speaks to him except to warn him against using their fishing boat without supervision. Alberto is desperate for Massimo's approval and fears being "fired" for his mistakes.

Alberto makes repeated attempts to win Massimo's favor, all of which end poorly. After one such attempt results in the loss of the day's catch, Alberto sneaks out at night and takes the fishing boat to catch more fish. He is startled by Machiavelli the cat, who stowed away on the boat, and drops his lantern, accidentally setting the boat on fire. They manage to escape just as Massimo races down to view the damage.

Despondent, Alberto packs his belongings and leaves. Massimo goes after him, and Alberto lambastes himself for his failures. As Massimo reaches out for him, Alberto accidentally calls him "Dad", surprising them both. Massimo reveals that he once made his own father angry enough to punch through a brick wall, but afterwards they made up by fixing it together. He and Alberto then share a hug, cementing their bond as surrogate father and son.

The next day, Massimo and Alberto work side-by-side to fix the boat, sharing stories and communicating more openly.

== Voice cast ==
- Jack Dylan Grazer as Alberto Scorfano, Massimo's adopted son, Giulia's adopted brother and Luca's best friend
- Marco Barricelli as Massimo Marcovaldo, Giulia's father and Alberto's adoptive father
- Jacob Tremblay as Luca Paguro, Alberto's best friend
- Additional voices: Gino La Monica, Arturo Sorino

== Development ==
Ciao Alberto was directed by Kenna Harris and produced by Matt DeMartini with Enrico Casarosa as an executive producer.

== Music ==
Dan Romer, who composed the music for Luca, composed the music for Ciao Alberto. The score was released on November 12, 2021.

Ciao Alberto (Original Motion Picture Soundtrack)

Film score by Dan Romer
- Released: November 12, 2021
- Genre: Film score
- Label: Hollywood

=== Track listing ===
All music is composed by Dan Romer.

No.	Title	Length
1.	"Dear Luca"	1:25
2.	"Lunch Is on Me"	0:51
3.	"I'll Make Him Proud"	0:46
4.	"You Don't Even Talk to Me"	0:49
5.	"Tell Me Everything"	0:45
6.	"Ciao Alberto"	0:50
Total length:		5:26

== Release ==
Ciao Alberto was released on November 12, 2021, as a Disney+ exclusive short film.

== Reception ==
=== Audience viewership ===
According to Whip Media, Ciao Alberto was the 8th most watched film across all platforms in the United States during the week of November 14, 2021.

=== Critical reception ===
Jennifer Roy of CBR.com found the short film to be an example of how communication matters between a parent and a child to build a strong bond, stating, "While Luca did subtextually set up Massimo as Alberto's new parental figure, Ciao Alberto makes this subtext text and shows that a large part of parenting is learning to adapt to each individual child's needs to make sure they feel supported and loved unconditionally." Jay Snook of The Good Men Project complimented the humor of the short film. Stephanie Morgan of Common Sense Media gave the short a 4 out of 5, praised the short film for the depiction of positive messages and role models, citing communication and perseverance, and complimented the diverse representations, writing, "Kids will love the silly adventures, while parents will appreciate the social-emotional lessons, like how Massimo learns to become a better communicator in order to improve his relationship with Alberto."

=== Accolades ===
Year	Award	Category	Recipient	Result	Ref.
2022	Children's and Family Emmy Awards	Outstanding Short Form Program	Ciao Alberto	Nominated	
2022	Children's and Family Emmy Awards	Outstanding Directing for an Animated Program	McKenna Harris	Nominated	
2022	Children's and Family Emmy Awards	Outstanding Editing for an Animated Program	Jennifer Jew	Won	
2022	Children's and Family Emmy Awards	Outstanding Sound Editing and Sound Mixing for an Animated Program	Liz Marston, André Fenley, Nicholas Docter	Nominated	
