= Enrico Casarosa =

Italian and American filmmaker (born 1971)

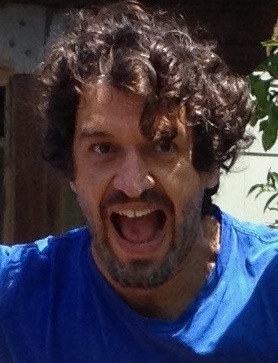
- Casarosa in 2014
- Born: 20 November 1971 (age 54); Genoa, Liguria, Italy
- Education: School of Visual Arts; Fashion Institute of Technology
- Occupations: Film director; screenwriter; storyboard artist
- Years active: 1996–present
- Employers: Blue Sky Studios (2002–2005); Pixar Animation Studios (2002–present)
- Spouse: Marit Casarosa
- Children: 1

Enrico Casarosa (born 20 November 1971) is an Italian and American director, screenwriter, and storyboard artist. Best known for his work at Pixar, he has directed the short film La Luna (2011) and the feature film Luca (2021), both of which were nominated for Academy Awards.

== Early life ==
Casarosa was born in Genoa, Italy, but moved to New York City in his twenties, to study animation at the School of Visual Arts and Illustration at the Fashion Institute of Technology.

== Career ==
Casarosa began his professional career as a background designer and storyboard artist on several animated TV series, including 101 Dalmatians: The Series and PB&J Otter. Before joining Pixar, he worked as a storyboard artist at Blue Sky Studios on Ice Age and Robots.

In 2002, Casarosa joined Pixar, where he worked as a story artist on Cars, Ratatouille, Up and Cars 2. In late 2004, Casarosa started a drawing marathon community called SketchCrawl and has been organizing the event ever since. In 2011, his short film La Luna premiered at the Annecy International Animated Film Festival in France, and was released theatrically with Pixar's Brave in 2012.

Cararosa then worked as head of story on The Good Dinosaur when Bob Peterson was the original director, and later as a story artist on Coco.

In 2021, Casarosa made his feature directorial debut with Luca, which was released on Disney+ in the United States. The film received generally positive reviews from critics for its nostalgic feel and acting. The film won a Hollywood Critics Association award for Best Picture. It was also nominated for Best Animated Feature Film at the 79th Golden Globe Awards and the 94th Academy Awards.

In October 2022, Cararosa stated he was developing another original Pixar feature film. In June 2025, the film was titled Gatto, with the story centered on a black cat named Nero living in Venice who questions whether he's lived the right lives. It is scheduled for release in 2027.

== Personal life ==
Casarosa currently resides in San Francisco with his wife Marit and daughter Fio.

== Filmography ==
=== Films ===
Year	Title	Director	Writer	Story Artist	Other	Voice Role	Notes
2002	Ice Age	No	No	Yes	No		
2005	Robots	No	No	Uncredited	No		
2006	Cars	No	No	Uncredited	No		
2007	Ratatouille	No	No	Yes	No		
2009	Up	No	No	Yes	No		
2011	Cars 2	No	No	Yes	No		
2015	The Good Dinosaur	No	No	No	Yes		Additional Story Supervision
2017	Coco	No	No	Yes	Yes		Pixar Senior Creative Team
2018	Incredibles 2	No	No	No	Yes		Pixar Senior Creative Team
2019	Toy Story 4	No	No	No	Yes		Pixar Senior Creative Team
2020	Onward	No	No	No	Yes		Pixar Senior Creative Team
2020	Soul	No	No	No	Yes		Pixar Senior Creative Team
2021	Luca	Yes	Story	No	Yes	Card Player, Angry Fisherman	Pixar Senior Creative Team
2022	Turning Red	No	No	No	Yes		Pixar Senior Creative Team
2022	Lightyear	No	No	No	Yes		Pixar Senior Creative Team
2023	Elemental	No	No	No	Yes		Pixar Senior Creative Team
2024	Inside Out 2	No	No	No	Yes		Pixar Senior Creative Team
2025	Elio	No	No	No	Yes		Pixar Senior Creative Team
2026	Hoppers	No	No	No	Yes		Pixar Senior Creative Team
2026	Toy Story 5	No	No	No	Yes		Pixar Senior Creative Team
2027	Gatto †	Yes	Screenplay	No	Yes	Saverio	Pixar Senior Creative Team

==== Shorts ====
Year	Title	Director	Writer	Character Designer	Story Artist	Executive Producer
2011	La Luna	Yes	Yes	Yes	No	No
2016	Piper	No	No	No	Yes	No
2021	Ciao Alberto	No	No	No	No	Yes

==== Featurettes and TV ====
Year	Title	Role
1996	Princess Gwenevere and the Jewel Riders	13 episodes Background design, storyboard revision
1997	The Secret of Anastasia	Direct-to-video; Lead character model designer, background layout designer
1997	The Amazing Feats of Young Hercules	Direct-to-video; Lead character model designer, background layout designer
1997–1998	101 Dalmatians: The Series	23 episodes Storyboard artist, storyboard revision artist, designer
1998–2000	PB&J Otter	18 episodes Background artist, storyboard artist

== Bibliography ==
- The Adventures of Mia, Volume One (2001) graphic novel
- Fragments (2001) art book with Ronnie Del Carmen
- The Adventures of Mia, Volume Two (2004) graphic novel
- Fragments Intermezzo (2004) art book
- Flight, Volume One (2004) part of a larger comic anthology
- Three Trees Make a Forest (2007) exhibition art book with Ronnie Del Carmen and Tadahiro Uesugi
- Totoro Forest Project (2008) with Daisuke Tsutsumi, Ronnie Del Carmen, and Yukino Pang
- The Venice Chronicles (2008)
- Disney Picture Book: La Luna (2012) in support of La Luna
- Disney Pixar: The Art of Luca (2021) in support of Luca

== Awards and nominations ==
Association	Year	Category	Work	Result	Ref(s)
Academy Awards	2012	Best Animated Short Film	La Luna	Nominated	
Academy Awards	2022	Best Animated Feature	Luca	Nominated	
Annie Awards	2016	Outstanding Achievement for Storyboarding in a Feature Production	The Good Dinosaur	Nominated	
Annie Awards	2022	Outstanding Achievement for Directing in a Feature Production	Luca	Nominated	
British Academy Film Awards	2022	Best Animated Film	Luca	Nominated	
Children's and Family Emmy Awards	2022	Outstanding Short Form Program	Ciao Alberto	Nominated	
Golden Globe Awards	2022	Best Animated Feature Film	Luca	Nominated	

== Special projects ==
In 2008, Enrico Casarosa (along with Ronnie del Carmen, Daisuke Tsutsumi and Yukino Pang) initiated the Totoro Forest Project, a fundraising exhibition/auction to support the non-profit Totoro Forest Foundation. This initiative also produced a corresponding art book reprinting the various pieces contributed and included the likes of James Jean, Charles Vess, Iain McCaig and William Joyce among others.
