= Kristin Russo =

American LGBTQ rights activist and podcaster

- Born: December 17, 1980 (age 45)
- Education: Marymount Manhattan College, CUNY Graduate Center
- Organization: Everyone Is Gay
- Spouse(s): Jenny Owen Youngs (m. 2013; div. 2018) Avanthi Govender (m. 2023)
- Website: www.kristinnoeline.com

Kristin Russo (born December 17, 1980) is an American speaker, personality, and LGBTQ activist. She is CEO and editor-in-chief of Everyone Is Gay and My Kid Is Gay, organizations that provide advice, guidance, and education to LGBTQ youth and their families, and is the co-author of This Is a Book for Parents of Gay Kids (Chronicle, 2014).

== Education ==
Russo received her Bachelor of Arts in theatre in 2002 from Marymount Manhattan College in New York City. She later went on to receive her Masters of Arts in Gender and Sexuality Studies from CUNY Grad Center in 2012.

== Work ==
=== LGBTQ outreach ===
In 2010, Russo and former business partner Dan Owens-Reid launched Everyone Is Gay as a Tumblr presence. Russo began providing regular written advice for LGBTQ youth's regularly submitted questions, and later that same year began to make video responses to these questions interspersed with lip-sync numbers.

In 2013, Russo and Owens-Reid began My Kid Is Gay (formerly The Parents Project,) a first-of-its-kind digital resource for families and educators of LGBTQ people. My Kid Is Gay provides advice from parents, youth, and experts about topics related to gender identity and sexuality. This project was inspired during the writing of This Is a Book for Parents of Gay Kids which was released in 2014 by Chronicle Books. This Is a Book for Parents of Gay Kids was written as an accessible, relatable, and non-clinical guide parents could turn to for contemporary answers to their questions. The book received glowing accolades from The Ellen Show, National Public Radio (NPR), Autostraddle, The Advocate, and many others.

In 2015, Russo hosted and produced the premiere season of First Person, a digital video series on sexuality and gender from WNET and PBS Digital Studios. In the series, Russo interviewed individuals whose lives intersected with issues related to gender identity and sexuality.

In 2016, Russo took on the role of CEO & Editor-in-Chief of both Everyone Is Gay & My Kid Is Gay. She continues to speak at school campuses & community centers, and in February 2016 began a new Everyone Is Gay video series (hosted on YouTube and broadcast live on Facebook) called "Getting In Bed with Kristin," where she answers advice and speaks with notable guests from the LGBTQ community on issues related to sexuality and gender.

Russo also co-directed a queer adult sleep-away camp founded and hosted by Autostraddle, called A-Camp.

=== Podcasting ===
==== Buffering The Vampire Slayer ====
In September 2016, Russo launched the podcast Buffering The Vampire Slayer with musician Jenny Owen Youngs. The podcast discusses the popular television series Buffy the Vampire Slayer one episode at a time, and each episode ends with an original recap song about the episode, penned by Youngs and Russo. The podcast is part of the Stitcher Premium network and has been featured in A.V. Club, Entertainment Weekly, Autostraddle, and Buzzfeed.

Russo wrote a memoir (Slayers, Every One of Us) with Owen Youngs about their experience hosting the show while going through a divorce.

==== The Boiler Room ====
In July 2019, Russo launched the podcast The Boiler Room, a My So-Called Life podcast, with writer and podcaster Joanna Robinson to coincide with the show's 25th anniversary. The podcast reviews the 1994 teen drama series episode by episode.

== Personal life ==
Russo married musician and songwriter Jenny Owen Youngs on August 25, 2013. On May 25, 2018, the couple announced they were no longer together but remained friends and would keep working in their mutual projects. Both said, "We've come to realize that we will be better—both to ourselves and to each other—within the context of a friendship, rather than a marriage."

On May 22, 2023, Russo married Avanthi Govender in New York City, and in February 2025 gave birth to a daughter.
