= Ingrid Michaelson discography =

- Studio albums: 9
- EPs: 6
- Compilation albums: 1
- Singles: 15
- Other song appearances: 3

The discography of American singer-songwriter Ingrid Michaelson consists of eight studio albums, one compilation album, and thirteen official singles. Her two highest charting singles are "The Way I Am" and "Girls Chase Boys" at No. 37 and No. 52 on the Billboard Hot 100, respectively.

== Albums ==
=== Studio albums ===
Title	Details	Peak chart positions						Sales
Title	Details	US	US Alt	US Indie	US Rock	CAN	GER	Sales
Slow the Rain	Release date: January 10, 2005; Label: Cabin 24; Formats: CD	—	—	—	—	—	—	
Girls and Boys	Release date: May 16, 2006; Label: Cabin 24, Original Signal, Spirit; Formats: LP, CD, digital download	63	16	6	17	—	100	
Everybody	Release date: August 25, 2009; Label: Cabin 24, Original Signal, Spirit; Formats: LP, CD, digital download	18	5	—	7	—	—	
Human Again	Release date: January 24, 2012; Label: Cabin 24, Mom+Pop Music, Spirit; Formats: LP, CD, digital download	5	—	1	2	22	—	
Lights Out	Release date: April 15, 2014; Label: Cabin 24, Mom+Pop, Spirit; Formats: LP, CD, digital download	5	—	1	2	8	50	US: 160,000
It Doesn't Have to Make Sense	Release date: August 26, 2016; Label: Cabin 24, Spirit; Formats: LP, CD, digital download	19	—	3	—	78	—	
Songs for the Season	Release date: October 26, 2018; Label: Cabin 24; Formats: LP, CD, digital download	94	—	3	—	—	—	
Stranger Songs	Release date: June 28, 2019; Label: Cabin 24; Formats: LP, CD, digital download	128	—	2	—	—	—	
For the Dreamers	Release date: August 23, 2024; Label: Cabin 24; Formats: LP, CD, digital download	—	—	—	—	—	—	
" – " denotes releases that did not chart

=== Compilation albums ===
Title	Details	Peak chart positions		
Title	Details	US	US Rock	US Indie
Be OK	Release date: October 14, 2008; Label: Cabin 24, Original Signal, Spirit; Formats: LP, CD, digital download	35	13	2

== Extended plays ==
Title	Details	Peak chart positions	
Title	Details	US Indie	US Sales
Live From Laurel Canyon	Released: 2012; Label: Cabin 24, Mom + Pop; Format: CD	—	—
Army of 3 (with Army of 3)	Released: October 1, 2013; Label: Spirit; Format: Digital download	—	—
Alter Egos	Released: May 12, 2017; Label: Cabin 24; Format: CD, vinyl, digital download	13	96
Snowfall	Released: November 10, 2017; Label: Cabin 24; Format: digital download	—	—
Songs For The Season B-Sides	Released: November 23, 2018; Label: Cabin 24; Format: Vinyl	—	—
Women to the Front: Ingrid Michaelson	Released: March 5, 2021; Label: UMG; Format: Digital download	—	—

== Singles ==
Title	Year	Peak chart positions										Certifications (sales threshold)	Album
Title	Year	US	US AAA	US AC	US Adult Pop	US Rock	AUT	CAN	IRE	GER	UK	Certifications (sales threshold)	Album
"The Way I Am"	2007	37	2	20	15	— (Note: "The Way I Am" did not enter the Billboard Hot Rock Songs chart, but peaked at number 12 on the Rock Digital Songs chart.)	36	51	—	69	—	RIAA: Platinum	Girls and Boys
"Little Romance"	2007	—	—	—	—	—	—	—	—	—	—		Sex and the City, Vol. 2: More Music
"Keep Breathing"	2007	—	—	—	—	—	—	—	—	—	—		Be OK
"Be OK"	2008	91	17	—	—	—	45	—	—	64	174		Be OK
"Winter Song" (with Sara Bareilles)	2008	– (Note: "Winter Song" did not enter the Billboard Hot 100, but peaked at number 18 on the Bubbling Under Hot 100 chart.)	—	—	—	—	–	97	2	—	—		The Hotel Café Presents Winter Songs
"Maybe"	2009	— (Note: "Maybe" did not enter the Billboard Hot 100, but peaked at number 9 on the Bubbling Under Hot 100 chart.)	2	27	14	38	—	— (Note: "Maybe" did not enter the Canadian Hot 100 but did peak at number 61 on the Canadian Digital Song Sales chart.)	—	97	—		Everybody
"Turn to Stone"	2009	—	—	—	—	— (Note: "Turn to Stone" did not enter the Billboard Hot Rock Songs chart, but peaked at number 15 on the Rock Digital Songs chart.)	—	—	—	—	—		Everybody
"All Love"	2009	—	—	—	—	—	—	—	—	—	—		Non-album single
"Everybody"	2010	—	20	—	—	—	—	—	—	—	—		Everybody
"Parachute"	2010	—	—	—	28	— (Note: "Parachute" did not enter the Billboard Hot Rock Songs chart, but peaked at number 17 on the Rock Digital Songs chart.)	—	—	—	—	—		Non-album singles
"Spare Change"	2011	—	—	—	—	—	—	—	—	—	—		Non-album singles
"Ghost"	2011	—	21	—	—	— (Note: "Ghost" did not enter the Billboard Hot Rock Songs chart, but peaked at number 33 on the Rock Digital Songs chart.)	—	—	—	—	—		Human Again
"Blood Brothers"	2012	—	—	—	—	—	—	—	—	—	—		Human Again
"Fire"	2012	— (Note: "Fire" did not enter the Billboard Hot 100, but peaked at number 3 on the Bubbling Under Hot 100 chart.)	—	—	—	— (Note: "Fire" did not enter the Billboard Hot Rock Songs chart, but peaked at number 14 on the Rock Digital Songs chart.)	—	—	—	—	—		Human Again
"Into You"	2012	—	—	—	—	—	—	—	—	—	—		Non-album single
"Without You"	2013	—	—	—	—	—	—	—	—	—	—		Non-album single
"Girls Chase Boys"	2014	52	12	11	6	8	—	69	—	—	—	RIAA: Platinum	Lights Out
"Afterlife"	2014	—	—	—	21	— (Note: "Afterlife" did not enter the Billboard Hot Rock Songs chart, but peaked at number 39 on the Rock Digital Songs chart.)	—	—	—	79	—		Lights Out
"Time Machine"	2015	—	—	24	—	—	—	—	—	—	—		Lights Out
"Hell No"	2016	—	—	—	14	—	—	—	—	—	—		It Doesn't Have to Make Sense
"Celebrate" (featuring AJR)	2016	—	—	—	—	—	—	—	—	—	—		It Doesn't Have to Make Sense
"The Lotto" (with AJR)	2016	—	—	—	—	—	—	—	—	—	—		What Everyone's Thinking
"Starlight"	2017	—	—	—	—	—	—	—	—	—	—		Non-album single
"Miss America" (featuring Sara Bareilles)	2017	—	—	—	—	—	—	—	—	—	—		Alter Egos
"Smallest Light"	2017	—	—	—	—	—	—	—	—	—	—		Soundtrack The Space Between Us
"Stay Right Where You Are"	2017	—	—	—	—	—	—	—	—	—	—		Soundtrack The Space Between Us
"Looks Like a Cold, Cold Winter"	2018	—	—	—	—	—	—	—	—	—	—		Songs for the Season
"Rockin' Around the Christmas Tree" (featuring Grace VanderWaal)	2018	—	—	24	—	—	—	—	—	—	—		Songs for the Season
"All I Want for Christmas Is You" (featuring Leslie Odom Jr.)	2018	—	—	12	—	—	—	—	—	—	—		Songs for the Season
"Missing You"	2018	—	—	—	21	—	—	—	—	—	—		Stranger Songs
"Jealous"	2019	—	—	—	—	—	—	—	—	—	—		Stranger Songs
"Good Time"	2019	—	—	—	—	—	—	—	—	—	—		Non-album single
"Christmas Valentine" (with Jason Mraz)	2019	—	—	23	—	—	—	—	—	—	—		Songs for the Season (Deluxe Edition)
"Tigers and Young Men"	2020	—	—	—	—	—	—	—	—	—	—		Non-album singles
"Build It Up"	2020	—	—	—	—	—	—	—	—	—	—		Non-album singles
"To Begin Again" (with Zayn)	2021	—	—	—	—	—	—	—	—	—	—		Non-album singles
"Merry Christmas, Happy New Year"	2021	—	—	20	—	—	—	—	—	—	—		Songs for the Season (Deluxe Edition)
" – " denotes releases that did not chart

== Other charted songs ==
List of singles, with selected chart positions
Title	Year	Peak chart positions		Album
Title	Year	US Hol. Dig.	US Rock Dig.	Album
"Can't Help Falling In Love" (live at Daytrotter)	2011	—	37	Be OK
"Have Yourself a Merry Little Christmas"	2011	33	27	Non-album song
"Auld Lang Syne"	2022	12	—	Songs for the Season

== Other appearances ==
Song	Album	Release date
"Everybody Loves" (with Greg Laswell)	The Gayest Compilation Ever Made Volume II	January 14, 2014
"New York City Moms"	Girls5eva Season 2 (Music from the Peacock Original Series)	June 10, 2022
