= List of Purchase College people =

The following is a list of individuals associated with Purchase College, State University of New York through attending as a student, or serving as a member of the faculty or staff.

== Notable alumni ==
=== Conservatory of Theater Arts and Film ===
The alumni of the Conservatory of Theater Arts and Film, compose what has been called the "Purchase Mafia" by several different sources, including Edie Falco and Hal Hartley. The term was first coined by casting director Eve Brandstein, and later used in multiple biographical listings of Purchase alumni on the Internet Movie Database. It was later picked up by the press when actress and Purchase alumna Edie Falco came to national attention as a result of her role on HBO's mob drama, The Sopranos.

==== Actors and actresses ====
Notable alumni and former students from the Conservatory of Theater Arts & Film include:

- Kirk Acevedo
- Sydney Cole Alexander
- Meghan Andrews
- Rochelle Aytes
- Robert John Burke
- Orlagh Cassidy
- Keegan DeWitt
- Ron Eldard
- Susie Essman
- Dwight Ewell
- Edie Falco
- Brian Gaskill
- Seth Gilliam
- Malcolm Goodwin
- Josh Hartnett
- Dean Haspiel
- Kali Hawk
- David Herman
- Zoe Kravitz
- Melissa Leo
- Jodi Long
- Matt Malloy
- Michael C. Maronna
- Laurence Mason
- James McDaniel
- Tracy Middendorf
- Janel Moloney
- Mizuo Peck
- Chris Perfetti
- Adina Porter
- Parker Posey
- Jason Ralph
- Ving Rhames
- Mel Rodriguez
- Bill Sage
- Lawrence Saint-Victor
- Jay O. Sanders
- Will Scheffer
- Paul Schulze
- Amanda Seales
- Terry Serpico
- Wesley Snipes
- Kellee Stewart
- Sherry Stringfield
- Francie Swift
- Richard Tanne
- Stanley Tucci
- Rey Valentin
- Steven Weber
- Shea Whigham
- Constance Wu

==== Theatrical designers and technicians ====
- David Gallo
- Brian MacDevitt
- Kenneth Posner

==== Playwrights and screenwriters ====
- Carl Capotorto
- Deborah Zoe Laufer
- Donald Margulies
- Jeffrey Alan Schechter

==== Producers ====
- Tom Donahue
- Bob Gosse
- Paul Heyman
- James Spione

==== Screenwriters ====
- A. Dean Bell
- Hal Hartley
- Mattson Tomlin
- Jeffrey Alan Schechter

==== Directors ====
- A. Dean Bell
- Ilya Chaiken
- Austin Chick
- Abel Ferrara
- Nick Gomez
- Bob Gosse
- Todd Graff
- Hal Hartley
- Azazel Jacobs
- Danny Leiner
- Vuk Lungulov-Klotz
- Tim McCann
- Nicholas McCarthy
- Eric Mendelsohn
- E. Elias Merhige
- Jeffrey Alan Schechter
- Rob Schmidt
- Jeffrey Schwarz
- Michael Spiller
- James Spione
- Mattson Tomlin
- Alex Turner
- Chris Wedge of Blue Sky Studios
- John G. Young

==== Editors ====
- Andrew Buckland
- Iris Cahn
- Tom Cross
- Jeff Kushner
- James Spione

=== Dancers and choreographers ===
- Kyle Abraham - Abraham.In.Motion
- Terese Capucilli - Martha Graham Dance Company
- Tami Stronach
- Doug Varone - José Limón Company, Doug Varone and Dancers, Lar Lubovitch Dance Company

=== Musicians ===
- Adult Mom
- The Age of Rockets
- Airwaves
- Victor Axelrod
- Chris Ballew of The Presidents of the United States of America
- Mal Blum
- Bill Charlap
- Bryndon Cook
- Imani Coppola
- Crying
- Dan Deacon
- Despot
- The Dude of Life
- Elite
- Fire Flies
- Gabriel Garzón-Montano
- Gregory and the Hawk
- Edward W. Hardy
- Ice Spice
- J-Zone
- Samara Joy
- Kiss Kiss
- Langhorne Slim
- Jeffrey Lewis
- LVL UP
- Mase
- Meneguar
- Mirk
- Mitski
- Moby (majored in sociology)
- Moving Mountains
- O'Death
- Only Son (formerly of Moldy Peaches)
- Daryl Palumbo of Glassjaw
- Photay
- Porches
- Mary Ruth Ray
- Suzzy Roche
- Bess Rogers
- Joel Rubin
- Sheer Mag
- Alan Shulman
- Gerard Smith, late bassist of TV on the Radio
- Regina Spektor
- Twin Sister
- Vérité
- Wooden Wand and the Vanishing Voice
- Jenny Owen Youngs

=== Artists ===
- Polly Apfelbaum
- Katherine Bradford
- Ingrid Calame
- Gregory Crewdson
- Thomas E. Franklin
- Dan Friedman
- Kris Graves
- Lucia Hierro
- Jon Kessler
- Aaron Krach
- Cal Lane
- Michael Rakowitz
- Alan Resnick
- Jimmy Joe Roche
- Ron Rocco
- Camille Seaman
- Laura Vaccaro Seeger
- Thorgy Thor
- Stephen Vitiello
- Fred Wilson

=== Liberal arts and sciences ===
==== Journalists ====
- Adam Nagourney
- J. Buzz Von Ornsteiner - forensic psychologist, journalist and television personality

==== Activists ====
- David Graeber
- Nasreen Pervin Huq
- Robyn Ochs
- Jill Bargonetti

==== Scientists ====
- Carl Safina

==== Authors ====
- Nora Raleigh Baskin
- Garth Greenwell
- Billy Taylor

=== Radio personalities ===
- Chris "Pepper Hicks" Stanley

== Notable faculty ==
- Shirley Neilsen Blum, professor emeritus (1970–1989); founded the Art History Department
