= Be OK =

Be OK may refer to:

- Be OK (album), 2008 album by Ingrid Michaelson
- "Be OK" (Ingrid Michaelson song), 2008 song
- "Be OK" (Chrisette Michele song), 2007 song
- "Be OK", 2014 song by Band-Maid from Maid in Japan
- "Be Okay", a 2014 song by American duo Oh Honey
- "Be OK", 2019 song by Twice from their album &Twice
