= Songs for the Season =

Studio album by Ingrid Michaelson
- Released: October 26, 2018
- Length: 39:10
- Label: Cabin 24; Mom + Pop
- Producer: Dan Romer; Saul Simon-MacWilliams

Ingrid Michaelson chronology
It Doesn't Have to Make Sense (2016)	Songs for the Season (2018)	Stranger Songs (2019)

Singles from Songs for the Season
- 1. "Looks Like a Cold, Cold Winter" Released: September 18, 2018; 2. "Rockin' Around the Christmas Tree" Released: October 12, 2018; 3. "All I Want for Christmas Is You" Released: November 18, 2018; 4. "Christmas Valentine" Released: November 25, 2019; 5. "Merry Christmas, Happy Holidays" Released: November 24, 2021

Songs for the Season, or Ingrid Michaelson's Songs for the Season, is the seventh studio album by American singer-songwriter Ingrid Michaelson, released by Cabin 24 Records on October 26, 2018. Produced after the release of her 2017 extended play Snowfall which compiled several winter- and holiday-themed songs, the album marked Michaelson's first Christmas album. Taking a nostalgic approach to covers of Christmas standards and carols, the singer worked with Dan Romer on most of the material.

The album earned largely positive reviews from music critics, who complimented the songs for their retro aesthetic. Songs for the Season debuted and peaked at number 94 on the US Billboard 200 and became Michaelson's fourth consecutive top three entry on the Independent Albums. It also reached number four on the Billboard's Top Holiday Albums chart. Cabin 24 issued several singles to promote the album. A deluxe edition reissue, featuring five additional tracks, was released on November 5, 2021.

== Background ==
Michaelson expressed that she loves the Christmas holiday and has wished to record a holiday album for years. Having recorded various Christmas songs such as the charity single "Winter Song", a duet with Sara Bareilles, she released Snowfall in 2017, an EP that compiled the winter- and holiday-themed songs she had recorded over the course of her career. Discussions about making her next studio album a full-length Christmas record began the same year. Drawing inspiration from Frank Sinatra, Nat King Cole, Judy Garland, and Brenda Lee, Michaelson envisioned an album "that was an instant, nostalgic classic" and would convey authenticity, warmth, and familiarity. She remarked, "I just wanted to make something that would honor that and celebrate that and something that I would want to listen to year after year after year after year. It wouldn't go sour, or go bad, or be dated."

Michaelson commissioned her friends, writers and producers Dan Romer and Saul Simon-MacWilliams, to produce the album. A breakaway from the adult contemporary pop sound on her previous album, the trio formulated the sound of Songs for the Season by using a microphone from the 1950s and recording all the strings together instead of double-tracking single recordings. While some of the songs remained close to the original versions, others were arranged more freely; Michaelson stated: "On Christmas covers you want something that is familiar that reminds you of past Christmases and holidays, and so I didn't really want to reinvent the wheel". Primarily a compilation of cover versions of Christmas standards and carols, Songs for the Season features one original track, "Happy Happy Christmas", which sheds light on the recent deaths of her parents.

== Critical reception ==
Professional ratings
Review scores
Source	Rating
AllMusic	3.5/5 stars

AllMusic editor Matt Collar remarked that "rather than take the more common contemporary approach to her first album of holiday-themed music on 2018's Songs for the Season, singer/songwriter Ingrid Michaelson instead successfully wraps herself in an old-school production that sounds like it was recorded in the 1950s." While he felt that the retro aesthetic of the album marked a breakaway from Michaelson's adult contemporary pop sound, Collar favorably compared the "cozy atmosphere" of the album, and its "big-band horns, cinematic strings, and cheery backing vocalists", with "the warmth of a happy childhood home during the holidays." Jon Caramanica from The New York Times declared the album "polite and precise Golden Age Christmas carol revivalism." He felt that while "the ornate first half of this album is pleasant, [...] the looser second half — with a cheeky “What Are You Doing New Year's Eve,” a spunky duet with Grace VanderWaal on “Rockin’ Around the Christmas Tree” and a surprisingly understated and tactile version of “All I Want for Christmas Is You,” with Leslie Odom Jr. — has real joy." Rolling Stone writer Connor Ratliff complimented Michaelson for the inclusion of her sole original record “Happy, Happy Christmas" and added: "[The album] is now in the rotation with Guaraldi & Sinatra & The Longines Symphonette, competing for time on the turntable all month long."

== Track listing ==
Songs for the Season track listing
No.	Title	Writer(s)	Length
1.	"Looks Like a Cold, Cold Winter"	Jack Fulton; Caesar Petrillo; Al Goering	3:00
2.	"White Christmas" (featuring Christina Perri)	Irving Berlin	3:38
3.	"Let It Snow! Let It Snow! Let It Snow!"	Jule Styne; Sammy Cahn	2:45
4.	"Have Yourself a Merry Little Christmas"	Ralph Blane; Hugh Martin	2:46
5.	"I'll Be Home for Christmas" (featuring Will Chase)	Buck Ram; Kim Gannon; Walter Kent	3:20
6.	"Happy, Happy Christmas"	Ingrid Michaelson	3:25
7.	"What Are You Doing New Year's Eve?"	Frank Loesser	3:03
8.	"Rockin' Around the Christmas Tree" (featuring Grace VanderWaal)	Johnny Marks; Owen Bradley	2:57
9.	"Mele Kalikimaka" (featuring Allie Moss & Bess Rogers)	Robert Alexander Anderson	2:57
10.	"Christmas Time Is Here"	Vince Guaraldi; Lee Mendelson	3:02
11.	"All I Want for Christmas Is You" (featuring Leslie Odom Jr.)	Mariah Carey; Walter Afanasieff	3:55
12.	"Auld Lang Syne"	Robert Burns	3:07
Total length:			39:10

Deluxe edition bonus tracks
No.	Title	Writer(s)	Length
13.	"It's the Most Wonderful Time of the Year"	Edward Pola; George Wyle	2:34
14.	"Christmas Valentine" (featuring Jason Mraz)	Ingrid Michaelson; Jason Mraz; Dave Barnes	3:07
15.	"A Marshmallow World"	Carl Sigman; Peter DeRose	2:18
16.	"Winter Wonderland" (featuring Allie Moss & Hannah Winkler)	Felix Bernard; Richard Bernhard Smith	2:07
17.	"Merry Christmas, Happy New Year" (featuring Zooey Deschanel)	Ingrid Michaelson; Zooey Deschanel; Dave Barnes	3:39

== Charts ==
Weekly chart performance for Songs for the Season
Chart (2018)	Peak position
US Billboard 200	94
US Independent Albums (Billboard)	3
US Top Holiday Albums (Billboard)	4

== Release history ==
Songs for the Season release history
Region	Date	Edition(s)	Format(s)	Label(s)	Ref.
Various	September 18, 2018	Standard	LP; CD; digital download; streaming	Cabin 24	
Various	November 5, 2021	Deluxe	LP; CD; digital download; streaming	Cabin 24	
