= Hayley Taylor =

American singer-songwriter

- Origin: Birmingham, Michigan
- Genres: Alternative, Folk rock, Indie
- Occupation: Singer-songwriter
- Instrument(s): Singing, guitar, piano
- Years active: 2005–present
- Website: hayleytaylor.com

Hayley Taylor is an American singer-songwriter, actress, painter and director whose songs have been featured on many popular television shows, including Netflix's Ginny & Georgia, How I Met Your Mother and Pretty Little Liars.

== Life ==
Born in Birmingham, Michigan, Hayley moved to Los Angeles as a child and began acting professionally in film and TV as a child., winning a Youth in Film Award for "Best Young Actress in a Motion Picture Drama" for her role in Touch of a Stranger with Shelley Winters.

As a young adult, Taylor guest starred on television shows such as Sabrina, The Teenage Witch, Unsolved Mysteries, ER, and 7th Heaven.

After graduating from Vassar College (with her A.B. in English) she studied painting at the Sorbonne University in Paris and the New York Academy of Art.

She is married to drummer and producer Anthony Burulcich (The Bravery, Morrissey, Weezer).

== Music career ==
Taylor's songs have been featured on Ginny & Georgia, Pretty Little Liars, How I Met Your Mother, Royal Pains, Privileged, MTV's Real World, and in many other TV shows and films. Taylor was classically trained on piano and singing early on, but it was not until she learned to play guitar in college that she realized music was her passion.

Taylor was nominated by the Los Angeles Music Awards for "Best Independent Album of the Year." She was interviewed on Entertainment Tonight and on San Francisco's KRON news. She was Interviewed on Dutch TV's EénVandaag and she performed with her band live on the music television show City Sessions: Los Angeles on the DISH Network.

Taylor's debut album, entitled One Foot in Front of the Other, produced by Dan Romer (Beasts of the Southern Wild)(Ingrid Michaelson) and Eric Robinson (Sara Bareilles) was released on August 24, 2010. It featured an all-star cast of players, including Michael Chaves (John Mayer) on guitar, Ben Peeler (Alexi Murdoch) on guitar and pedal steel, Adrienne Woods (Josh Radin)(Jonas Brothers) on cello, Elliot Jacobson (Ingrid Michaelson) on drums, and producer Marshall Altman (Kate Voegele) on backing vocals.

She is currently working on two new band projects, The Fauve and X My Heart with drummer Anthony Burulcich.

=== Discography ===
- Full Length LP, 2023 (forthcoming)
- Single "Riptide," 2022
- Single "Falling Hard," 2019
- Single "1983 (Safari Riot Remix)"(as The Fauve featuring Hayley Taylor), 2018
- Full Length LP, "Dangerous"(as X My Heart), 2016
- Single "How in the World" (as X My Heart), 2015
- Full-Length Debut LP "One Foot in Front of the Other", 2010
- Single "Felt Like Love", 2010
- Single "No More Wishing", 2009
- Holiday Single "If There Really Is a Santa Claus", 2008

== Filmography ==
Film
Year	Title	Role	Notes
2002	ER	Renee Carlson	"Bygones" (season 8: episode 17)
2002	Sabrina, the Teenage Witch	Female Council Member	"The Whole Ball of Wax" (season 6: episode 20)
2002	Unsolved Mysteries	Jenny	"Without a Song" (season 13: episode 48)
2006	7th Heaven	Andie	"You Don't Know What You've Got 'Til He's Gone" (season: 11 episode 10)

== Placements ==
- "Riptide" on Netflix's Ginny & Georgia
- "Waking" on Netflix's Ginny & Georgia
- "Closer to Me" (as X My Heart) on HBO's Crashing (U.S. TV series)
- "How in the World" (as X My Heart) on The Slap (U.S. TV series), (Episode 8, Season 1)
- "Pretty in the Dark" on Rush, (Episode 7, Season 1)
- "Bulletproof" in Night Moves
- "Plans" on Pretty Little Liars, (Episode 13, Season 1)
- "What's Going On" on Pretty Little Liars, (Episode 11, Season 1)
- "How Good We Had it" on Pretty Little Liars, (Episode 3, Season 2)
- "No More Wishing" on Pretty Little Liars, (Episode 11, Season 2)
- "Felt Like Love" on Chevrolet Commercial
- "Felt Like Love" in DayQuil Commercial
- "No More Wishing" on MTV's The Challenge: Fresh Meat II
- "Bulletproof" on MTV's The Challenge: Fresh Meat II
- "No More Wishing" on How I Met Your Mother, (Episode 12, Season 4)
- "All By Ourselves"* (duet with The 88) on How I Met Your Mother, (Episode 4, Season 5)
- "Waking" on Royal Pains, (Episode 7, Season 1)
- "Waking" on Privileged, (Episode 16, Season 1)

== Performances ==
Taylor frequently performs with her band at the famed Hotel Cafe, and other prime Los Angeles venues.

== Live Televised Appearances ==
Entertainment Tonight.

== Airplay ==
Taylor began garnering major airplay on XMU's Radar Report and Indie 103.1's Suicide Girls' Radio which led to her co-hosting the show for three months.
