= Missing You (Ingrid Michaelson song) =

Single by Ingrid Michaelson

Single by Ingrid Michaelson

from the album Stranger Songs
- Released: May 10, 2019
- Genre: Synth-pop
- Length: 2:54
- Label: Cabin 24
- Songwriters: Ingrid Michaelson; Jesse Thomas; Sam de Jong
- Producer: De Jong

Ingrid Michaelson singles chronology
| "All I Want for Christmas Is You" (2018) | "Missing You" (2019) | "Jealous" (2019) |

Music video
- "Missing You" on YouTube

"Missing You" is a song by American singer-songwriter Ingrid Michaelson from her eighth studio album, Stranger Songs (2019). It was released as the album's lead single on May 10, 2019, via Cabin 24 Records. The song was written by Michaelson, Jesse Thomas and Sam de Jong, and was produced by the latter. A synth-pop song with a pulsating beat heavily influenced by 1980s music, "Missing You" is about a love triangle in which its protagonist pines for a love interest despite being in a relationship with a different person.

All tracks on Stranger Songs were inspired by scenes and themes from the television series Stranger Things, with Michaelson basing "Missing You" on the love triangle between the characters Nancy Wheeler, Jonathan Byers, and Steve Harrington. Despite this specific inspiration, Michaelson wrote the lyrics to be open to universal interpretations beyond the context of the series. "Missing You" received generally positive reviews from music critics, who praised its production, lyrics, and Stranger Things references.

Following a Pac-Man themed lyric video, a music video directed by Daniel Carberry was released on July 10, 2019, featuring Michaelson singing surrounded by several dancers. The singer also released an animated music video drawn by comic book artist Kevin Wada, which stars a gender ambiguous protagonist. Michaelson promoted the song with live performances on Live with Kelly and Ryan and Today, as well as throughout her Dramatic Tour.

== Background and writing ==
"Missing You" was written by Ingrid Michaelson, Jesse Thomas and Sam de Jong, while de Jong produced the track. The song's parent album, Stranger Songs, is a concept album inspired by the science fiction television series Stranger Things, of which Michaelson is a fan. Each song on the album was inspired by either a scene or a theme from Stranger Things before being developed into complete songs. Michaelson found comfort in the show's nostalgic elements, which reminded her of her own childhood.

Michaelson wrote "Missing You" from the perspective of the Stranger Things character Nancy Wheeler (Natalia Dyer). In the series, the character is involved in a love triangle between herself, her crush Jonathan Byers (Charlie Heaton) and her current boyfriend Steve Harrington (Joe Keery). Michaelson incorporated specific references into the song that she believed fans should be able to recognize if they "know to look for them". In an Instagram post dated May 16, 2019, Michaelson said the song's concept of "being with one person, but knowing you should be with somebody else" is widely relatable. "Missing You" was released as the lead single of Stranger Songs on May 10, 2019, by Cabin 24 Records.

== Music and lyrics ==
"Missing You" is a synth-pop and dance song. Drawing inspiration from 1980s music, the track features a "grainy bassline". Described as flirty and palpitating, the song is two minutes and fifty-four seconds in duration. Billboard contributor Rania Annattos described "Missing You" as "a nostalgic, pulsating beat with lovesick lyrics straight from the 1980s." Performed in the key of C major, the song builds slowly towards an explosive chorus. Eden Arielle Gordon of Popdust felt the song borrows its "muffled synth-driven arpeggiations" from Stranger Things' theme song, on top of which Michaelson's "crystal-clear vocal tones" are layered. AllMusic reviewer Matt Collar wrote that the song's "low-end Giorgio Moroder-esque pulse finds Michaelson striking a balance between the arid synthesizer aesthetic of the series and her own knack for crafting buoyant, heartfelt anthems."

"Missing You" is about a love triangle, specifically fantasizing about an individual while being in a relationship with someone else. Michaelson sings the lyrics, "He's got his hands in all the right places / But the wrong face is in front of me." Despite the protagonist's efforts to move on, she continues to think about her old crush despite her new relationship. A 2019 press release reveals that the song explores the universal theme of missing someone; the protagonist misses her partner regardless of whether they are together or apart. Taking on the role of Nancy, Michaelson "laments over not being with the real object of her affection", according to Study Break's Abby Webb. Containing the line "I don’t wanna be dramatic / But your, but your lips are like a drug, and I'm an addict", the song's refrain reads "Kissing me, I’m missing you / You’re in my head". Michaelson performs the chorus in a pop manner: "You’re in my head again/I can’t get you out / I try but you just never move / I’m in his bed again, feeling like a stranger".

Hollywood Life described the song as an example of Stranger Songs "tapping into romance as nostalgia". According to Gordon, the lyrical content of "Missing You" "offers the kind of complex portrayal of romantic tension that Michaelson has always been an expert at painting in her music", demonstrated by the line "When he's kissing me I'm missing you ... I'm in his bed feeling like a stranger." Julia Greenspan of The Daily Rind Blog observed that the song carries "modern-day lyrical weight" despite its 1980s-based production. Writing for The Arts Desk, Lisa-Marie Ferla observed that the lyrics maintain a universality despite its "sultry synths and darker melody" inspired by Stranger Things' storyline. Similarly, BBC music critic Mark Savage believes, without context, the song "can be interpreted as a song about yearning for an ex", continuing, "Discovering it's really about the love triangle between the show's Nancy, Steve and Jonathan characters just provides an added frisson for fans."

== Reception ==
"Missing You" received positive reviews from music critics. In anticipation of the album's release, Idolator contributor Mike Wass considered "Missing You" to be a strong indication that Stranger Songs is "shaping up to be something special". Abby Webb of Study Breaks described the song as the album's "poppiest and catchiest track". Writing for Substream Magazine, Gabriel Aikins described "Missing You" as an "incredible" song with a winning hook, believing the single should appease Stranger Things fans until the show's third season premieres. Eden Arielle Gordon of Popdust described "Missing You" as "a euphoric and sugar-sweet song that could easily soundtrack a triumphant bike ride in a Stranger Things final scene". A writer for Sputnikmusic said the song "sounds like it could be played in clubs more easily than a coffee shop."

By June 2019, "Missing You" had exceeded one million streams on Spotify. On August 10, 2019, the single peaked at number 21 on the US Adult Top 40 charts, becoming Michaelson's seventh song to appear on the chart.

== Music videos and live performances ==
The single's release on May 10, 2019, was accompanied by a lyric video inspired by the video game Pac-Man. Michael Walsh of Nerdist described the video as "perfect ... because you don’t get much more ’80s than Pac-Man." An official music video was released on July 10, 2019, premiering on Today. Directed by Daniel Carberry, the entire video was filmed in one take. In the video, Michaelson sings surrounded by 10 dancers performing elaborate choreography. Michaelson primarily sings from the center of a platform while a troupe of dancers performs around her, all of whom are dressed entirely in black. The lighting constantly changes colors throughout the video, juxtaposing the muted clothes of its cast. Towards the end of the song, the dancers pass Michaelson around to each other in a circle as she sings, until the dancers fall to the ground and the video cuts to black.

Michaelson also released an animated video inspired by graphic novels, with artwork by comic book artist Kevin Wada. Wada was drawn to work on the video upon hearing the song's intro, elaborating, "The song has this deliciously slow build that by the time the chorus blasts off ... you feel like you're taking a ride through the map of someone's memories." The main character is of ambiguous gender which, according to Michaelson, was a deliberate effort "to open the song up to everyone’s experience" and sexuality. The video is part of a graphic novel video series, which features a different video for each Stranger Songs track with queer storylines.

In July 2019, Michaelson performed "Missing You" live on Live with Kelly and Ryan. She also sang it on Today. Michaelson included the song in the setlist of her Dramatic Tour in support of the album.

== Credits and personnel ==
Credits adapted from Jaxsta:

- Ingrid Michaelson – vocals, songwriter
- Jesse Thomas – songwriter
- Sam de Jong – songwriter, producer

== Chart performance ==
Chart performance for "Missing You"
| Chart (2019) | Peak position |
|---|---|
| US Adult Top 40 (Billboard) | 21 |
