= Celebrate (Ingrid Michaelson song) =

2016 single by Ingrid Michaelson

Single by Ingrid Michaelson

from the album It Doesn't Have to Make Sense
- Released: August 18, 2016
- Length: 3:29
- Label: Cabin 24; Mom + Pop
- Songwriters: Cason Cooley; Ingrid Michaelson; Katie Herzig
- Producers: Cason Cooley; Katie Herzig

Ingrid Michaelson singles chronology
"Light Me Up" (2016)	"Celebrate" (2016)	"The Lotto" (2016)

"Celebrate" is a song by American singer-songwriter Ingrid Michaelson from her sixth studio album, It Doesn't Have to Make Sense (2016). It was released as a promotional single for the album on August 18, 2016.

== Background ==
Ingrid Michaelson wrote a majority of It Doesn't Have to Make Sense (2016) while taking inspiration from the loss of her mother, giving the album a dark tone. To contrast this feeling, Michaelson began writing the chorus of "Celebrate", stating in an interview "how can you not be happy when you're singing the word 'celebrate?'" During live performances, she would detail her interactions with Jimmy Clark that are described within the song before performing it.

== Personnel ==
Credits adapted from Tidal.

- Ingrid Michaelson – lead vocals, lyricist, composer
- Cason Cooley – piano, lyricist, composer, producer
- Katie Herzig – lyricist, composer, producer
- Chris Athens – mastering engineer
- F. Reid Shippen – mixer
- Butterfly Boucher – bass guitar
- Jeremy Lutito – drums
- Tyler Burkum – electric guitar

== AJR version ==
"Celebrate (feat. AJR)"

Single by Ingrid Michaelson featuring AJR

from the album Alter Egos
- Released: May 12, 2017
- Length: 3:17
- Label: Cabin 24; Mom + Pop
- Songwriters: Cason Cooley; Ingrid Michaelson; Katie Herzig
- Producers: Cason Cooley; Katie Herzig; Ryan Met

AJR singles chronology
"It's On Us" (2017)	"Celebrate" (2017)	"Drama" (2017)

Music video
- Celebrate (feat. AJR) on YouTube

On May 8, 2017, a version of the song featuring American indie pop band AJR was released as the only single for Michaelson's Alter Egos, an EP of five re-recorded tracks featuring new artists. A music video for the song featuring both groups was later released on June 13, 2017.

=== Background ===
In support of It Doesn't Have to Make Sense, Michaelson toured in 2016 while featuring AJR as an opening act. During the development of Alter Egos, Michaelson recalled the experience as fun and picked AJR as a remixer. The band added various instruments to the song with lead singer Jack Met additionally re-recording the second verse. Their remix of "Celebrate" is the only song on the EP to feature elements of the original song, with other collaborators re-recording all portions of the song.

=== Music video ===
An official video directed by Andrew Elvis Miller was released on June 13, 2017. The video features Michaelson and various dancers in medieval themed clothing and large powdered wigs inspired by Hamilton, using modern objects while in solid black and white backgrounds. AJR later appears in the same attire, with band member Adam carrying a bass guitar and Ryan carrying a sample machine. The song's video was filmed at YouTube Space in New York City, with choreography done by Stacey Tookey.

=== Commercial performance ===
AJR's success with their 2016 single "Weak" commercially boosted their remix of "Celebrate", out-performing Michaelson's original song and other remixes appearing on Alter Egos. The remix tipped on the Ultratop 50 Flanders, contributing to the EP reaching number 13 on Billboard's Independent Albums and number 96 on Billboard's Top Album Sales chart.

=== Charts ===
Weekly chart performance for "Celebrate (feat. AJR)"
Chart (2017)	Peak position
Belgium (Ultratip Bubbling Under Flanders)	–
