= Empty Bottle (disambiguation) =

Empty Bottle is a bar and music venue in Chicago, Illinois.

Empty Bottle may also refer to:

- "Empty Bottle", song from 2005 Ingrid Michaelson album Slow the Rain
- "Empty Bottle", song from 2015 Veruca Salt album Ghost Notes
- "Empty Bottle", song from 2016 Owen album The King of Whys
