= The Age of Rockets =

American indie rock group

- Origin: New York, New York
- Genres: Orchestral Indie rock
- Years active: 2003 – present
- Label: Astronaut / Dinosaur
- Members: Andrew Futral - vocals, synthesizers, guitars, orchestra arrangements, Rhodes; Bess Rogers - synthesizers, Harmonium, Flute, vocals Saul Simon-MacWilliams - bass, synthesizers, Trumpet, vocals Adam Christgau - Drum kit
- Website: Official site

The Age of Rockets is an orchestral/electronic indie rock group from New York City.

== History ==
The project started in 2003 by frontman Andrew Futral as a solo endeavor while he studied at the Purchase College Conservatory of Music. After winning the John Lennon Songwriting Contest in 2004, Andrew produced his first record, entitled The Drive Home. Shortly after, he was joined by fellow Purchase College musicians Bess Rogers and Saul Simon-MacWilliams. The band has toured the United States and the UK, and in 2008 their second album Hannah was released. In 2009, the band announced plans to record a triple album, with three versions of ten songs comprising the material of the set.

== Style and Tone ==
"The Drive Home" consisted of only Andrew Futral's own efforts and featured extensive use of synthesizers and electronic sounds. In the second release, "Hannah", (with the addition of Bess Rogers, etc.) the album involves a larger amount of vocal harmonies, orchestral instrumentation (clarinet, flute, trumpet, cello, violin). Both albums drew comparisons to the band The Postal Service.

== Discography ==
- The Drive Home (2005)
- Hannah (2008)
- Adults (2013)

== Side Projects ==
The Age of Rockets and its members are involved with several side projects most notably The Robot Explosion which consists of all members of The Age of Rockets and Jenny Owen Youngs. Andrew Futral has a remix based side project with singer Ingrid Michaelson called "Ingrid & Andrew".

== Production ==
Since 2008, Andrew Futral has produced 3 albums and 3 EPs for mc chris, as well as several songs for Kevin Smiths SModcast podcast. Together, mc chris and Andrew are sometimes billed and referred to as "The Snobots" a fake Icelandic production team. He has also produced tracks for Toby Goodshank of The Moldy Peaches.
