= Everybody (Ingrid Michaelson album) =

Studio album by Ingrid Michaelson
- Released: August 25, 2009
- Genre: Indie pop
- Length: 43:22
- Label: Cabin 24
- Producers: Dan Romer and Ingrid Michaelson

Ingrid Michaelson chronology
Be OK (2008)	Everybody (2009)	Human Again (2012)

Singles from Everybody
- 1. "Maybe" Released: July 14, 2009

Professional ratings
Aggregate scores
Source	Rating
Metacritic	66/100
Review scores
Source	Rating
AllMusic	4/5 stars
American Music Channel	4.5/5 stars
Entertainment Weekly	(B)
MSN Music (Consumer Guide)	(dud)

Everybody is the third studio album by American singer-songwriter Ingrid Michaelson. The album was released on August 25, 2009, on Cabin 24 Records. The first single from the album, "Maybe", was released on July 14, 2009.

== Background ==
Originally, Michaelson wanted her album to sound close to "Once Was Love." Michaelson has stated that Everybody is "completely autobiographical, snapshots of my life." The main theme of the album, as stated by Michaelson, is "everybody wants to be loved."

== Track listing ==
All songs written and composed by Ingrid Michaelson.

1. "Soldier" – 3:37
2. "Everybody" – 3:29
3. "Are We There Yet?" – 3:51
4. "Sort Of" – 3:21
5. "Incredible Love" – 3:53
6. "The Chain" – 2:59
7. "Mountain and the Sea" – 3:33
8. "Men of Snow" – 4:33
9. "So Long" – 3:13
10. "Once Was Love" – 3:35
11. "Locked Up" – 3:56
12. "Maybe" – 3:13

CD bonus tracks

1. "This is For"
2. "Turn to Stone"

== Personnel ==
- Luke Cissell – violin
- Jay Dawson – bagpipes
- Seth Faulk – congas
- Mick Irwin – trumpet
- Elliot Jacobson – clacker, drums, bass drum, shaker, tambourine
- Ben Kalb – cello
- Chris Kuffner – bass guitar, double bass, electric guitar, mandolin
- Geoff Lewil – handclapping
- Todd Low – viola
- Saul Simon MacWilliams – handclapping
- Oliver Manchon – violin
- Ingrid Michaelson – Fender Rhodes, acoustic guitar, organ, piano, ukulele, lead vocals, background vocals
- Bess Rogers – electric guitar
- Dan Romer – accordion, bass guitar, Chamberlin, drums, Fender Rhodes, glockenspiel, acoustic guitar, electric guitar, handclapping, keyboards, mellotron, organ, percussion, piano, programming, tambourine, ukeke, ukulele
- Hiroko Taguchi – violin
- Brandon Walters – electric guitar

== Charts ==
Chart (2009)	Peak position
US Billboard 200	18
