= Girls and Boys (album) =

Studio album by Ingrid Michaelson
- Released: May 16, 2006
- Recorded: 2005–2006
- Genres: Folk-pop; indie pop
- Length: 45:36
- Label: Self-released
- Producers: Mark Turrigiano; Ingrid Michaelson; Chris Kuffner

Ingrid Michaelson chronology
Slow the Rain (2005)	Girls and Boys (2006)	Be OK (2008)

Singles from Girls and Boys
- 1. "The Way I Am" Released: September 18, 2007

Professional ratings
Review scores
Source	Rating
AllMusic	3.5/5 stars
Blogcritics	(favorable)
PopMatters	(5/10)
The Washington Post	(favorable)

Girls and Boys is the second studio album and major-label debut by American pop singer Ingrid Michaelson. It was self-released on May 16, 2006. Some of the album's songs have been featured in the television series Grey's Anatomy. Michaelson's record label Cabin 24 Records re-released the album on September 18, 2007 and it peaked at No. 62 on the Billboard 200.

According to Nielsen SoundScan the album has sold 278,000 copies in the United States as of August 2009.

== Track listing ==
All songs written by Ingrid Michaelson.

1. "Die Alone" – 4:21
2. "Masochist" – 4:11
3. "Breakable" – 3:09
4. "The Hat" – 3:45
5. "The Way I Am" – 2:15
6. "Overboard" – 4:06
7. "Glass" – 3:04
8. "Starting Now" – 4:52
9. "Corner of Your Heart" – 3:07
10. "December Baby" – 5:53
11. "Highway" – 3:50
12. "Far Away" – 3:03 (hidden track)

=== Special Be OK edition ===
A special edition of the album was released in 2009 in Germany and Austria, additionally featuring all studio tracks from Be OK.

All songs written by Ingrid Michaelson, except where noted.

1. "Die Alone" – 4:21
2. "Masochist" – 4:11
3. "Breakable" – 3:09
4. "The Hat" – 3:45
5. "The Way I Am" – 2:15
6. "Overboard" – 4:06
7. "Glass" – 3:04
8. "Starting Now" – 4:52
9. "Corner of Your Heart" – 3:07
10. "December Baby" – 5:53
11. "Highway" – 3:50
12. "Far Away" – 3:03
13. "Keep Breathing" – 3:25
14. "Be OK" – 2:27
15. "Giving Up" – 4:09
16. "Over the Rainbow" (Harold Arlen, E.Y. Harburg) – 2:56
17. "Lady in Spain" – 3:11
18. "Oh What a Day" – 2:28
19. "You and I" – 2:28

== Personnel ==
- Drew Fuccillo – organ, piano
- Lana Hagai – guitar, organ, vocals
- Elliot Jacobson – drums
- Chris Kuffner – producer, bass, guitar, vocals
- Ingrid Michaelson – guitar, piano, vocals,
- Dan Romer – mixer, glockenspiel, keyboards
- Greg Samothrakis – guitar, organ, vocals
- Mark Turrigiano – producer, guitar, keyboards, percussion, programming
- Roman Zeitlin – guitar

== Chart positions ==
Chart (2007)	Peak position
German Albums (Offizielle Top 100)	100
US Billboard 200	62
US Independent Albums (Billboard)	6
US Heatseekers Albums (Billboard)	1
US Top Rock Albums (Billboard)	17
