= Elliot Jacobson =

American singer-songwriter

Elliot Benjamin Jacobson is an American drummer, songwriter and producer. He was the producer and cowriter of Vérité for her first EP, Echo and the majority of her second EP, Sentiment. He plays drums for the New York-based singer/songwriter Ingrid Michaelson. He also plays drums for Jenny Owen Youngs, Elle King, Emily Kinney, and Wakey! Wakey!.

Jacobson was born in Houston, TX and moved as a teen to Buffalo, NY. Elliot started playing drums in his middle school band, later playing with A New Easy Way. It was while Jacobson was attending Wagner College on Staten Island, NY that he met Ingrid Michaelson and her bassist Chris Kuffner. Michaelson invited Jacobson to play drums on her first album Slow The Rain. He later played drums on Girls and Boys, Be Ok, Everybody, Human Again, Lights Out and other separate releases.

Jacobson has performed on The Late Show with David Letterman, The Tonight Show with Jay Leno, Late Night with Conan O'Brien, The Ellen DeGeneres Show, Good Morning America, The Rachael Ray Show, Live with Regis and Kelly, The CBS Early Show and others.

Jacobson has performed live with Regina Spektor, Anya Marina, Katie Costello, Greg Holden, David Garza, and many others.

As a popular session drummer, Jacobson has recorded with Emily Kinney, Greg Laswell, The Vamps, A Great Big World, Lenka, April Smith, Dan Romer, Hayley Taylor, Nick Howard, Samantha Ronson, Beasts of the Southern Wild, Abigail Breslin, Sarah Blacker, John-Allison Weiss, Jay Stolar, He is We and many others.

In 2010, Jacobson was voted as #1 Up and Coming Drummer in the Modern Drummer Magazine's Readers Poll.

When he is not touring, Jacobson currently resides in Brooklyn, NY.
