= Luke Cissell =

Composer, musician, recording artist

- Born: Louisville, Kentucky
- Genres: contemporary classical; experimental
- Occupations: Composer; Musician
- Website: lukecissell.com

Luke Cissell (born in Louisville, Kentucky, USA) is an American composer and multi-instrumentalist known for creating works that feature "bright, glowing melodies and ornate structures while incorporating a heady range of styles" from classical to bluegrass, jazz, folk, post-rock, and art pop. Cissell was a champion fiddler and classical violinist in his youth, earned a degree from Princeton University, and has worked as a producer, arranger, and session musician with a broad range, with credits on albums by artists such as singer-songwriter Ingrid Michaelson and composer Philip Glass. Known for performing every part on most of his studio album releases, Cissell has composed and recorded a number of works that prominently feature strings.

== Selected works ==
- Cosmography (2013)
- Infinite Progress (2014) for solo violin
- Backwoods (2015)
- String Quintet (2016)
- Sonata for Viola and Piano (2017)
- Three Piano Pieces (2017)
- Thinking/Feeling (2018) for mandolin, banjo, electric guitar, electric bass, strings and electronics
- String Sextets Nos. 1 & 2 (2019)
- Nightside (2020)
- Emerald Cities (2021)
- Pulp (2023) for string orchestra
- Serenade for Strings (2023)
