= It Doesn't Have to Make Sense =

Studio album by Ingrid Michaelson
- Released: August 26, 2016
- Length: 35:45
- Label: Cabin 24; Mom + Pop
- Producer: Cason Cooley; Barry Dean; Katie Herzig; Chris Kuffner; Luke Laird; Ingrid Michaelson; Dan Romer

Ingrid Michaelson chronology
Lights Out (2014)	It Doesn't Have to Make Sense (2016)	Songs for the Season (2018)

It Doesn't Have to Make Sense is the sixth studio album by American singer-songwriter Ingrid Michaelson. It was released on August 26, 2016, through Cabin 24 Records under exclusive license to Mom + Pop Music. Conceived after the end of her marriage with musician Greg Laswell and the death of her mother Elizabeth, Michaelson reteamed with a wider range of previous collaborators to work on the album, including Cason Cooley, Barry Dean, Katie Herzig, Chris Kuffner, Luke Laird and Dan Romer.

The album was released to generally positive reviews from music critics, some of whom cited it her "strongest and most powerful album" by then. It debuted and peaked at number 19 on the US Billboard 200 and marked Michaelson's third consecutive album to reach the top three of the Independent Albums chart. It Doesn't Have to Make Sense was preceded by its lead single, "Hell No", released on April 29, 2016, followed by the promotional singles "Light Me Up" and "Celebrate".

== Promotion ==
To promote the album, Michaelson embarked on the "Hell No Tour" on October 6, 2016, in Cincinnati, Ohio. Promotional appearances in the media to support the album included a performance of "Hell No" on The Tonight Show Starring Jimmy Fallon on June 7, 2016, and a performance of "Hell No" on The Late Late Show with James Corden on August 22, 2016. Michaelson then performed "Still the One" on Live with Kelly on September 28, 2016. On August 15, a playlist featuring 30 seconds of every song was uploaded to Spotify.

=== Alter Egos EP ===
An EP of five re-recorded tracks featuring new artists, titled Alter Egos, was released on May 12, 2017. "Celebrate" featuring AJR was released as a promotional single ahead of the EP's release. Other featured artists featured include Sara Bareilles and Tegan and Sara.

== Critical reception ==
Professional ratings
Review scores
Source	Rating
AllMusic	4/5 stars
Cryptic Rock	4/5 stars
Sputnikmusic	4/5

It Doesn't Have to Make Sense earned largely positive reviews from critics. AllMusic editor Matt Collar noted thath It Doesn't Have to Make Sense "finds the singer/songwriter delving into a set of sonically robust, emotionally transfiguring anthems recorded in the wake of her mother's death and the breakup of her marriage. The album follows her similarly lush 2014 effort, Lights Out, and as with that record, this one features production from a handful of longtime collaborators." Nina Ellis from Cryptic Rock felt that "Michaelson digs deeper on It Doesn’t Have to Make Sense while remaining true to the artist people have fallen in love with. She does not stray from her signature sound, but the honesty and transparency she injects into her latest effort give us something more tangible to reach for."

Erica Dischino, writing for The Ithacan, called the album "a a true testament to Michaelson’s resilience in times of emotional distress. Her optimistic outlook paired with a raw sound creates a balanced album full of dynamic lyrics and infectious beats. Overall, her seventh album is one not to miss."Spectrum Culture's Nick Gregorio wrote that "Michaelson may have been put through the proverbial wringer recently. But if it’s any consolation to her, she’s created something truly special, a pop album without the gossamer, stuffed with radio-ready hooks full of blood and guts. It will make you cry, smile and feel grateful for everything you have while offering the strength it takes to move on from life’s trials and tribulations." Sputnikmusic found that "although there are occasional sojourns into peppier territory, It Doesn’t Have to Make Sense is largely just a matter of Ingrid sitting alone with her thoughts, a pen, and an acoustic guitar or piano [...] It may not be very likely to top the charts because of its languid nature, but unearthing some of the lyrical gems here is actually far more rewarding. This is more than Ingrid simply reminding us that she’s still here; she’s reminding us of why we connected with her music to begin with."

== Track listing ==
It Doesn't Have to Make Sense track listing
No.	Title	Writer(s)	Producer(s)	Length
1.	"Light Me Up"	Ingrid Michaelson; Cason Cooley; Katie Herzig	Cooley; Herzig	4:07
2.	"Whole Lot of Heart"	Michaelson; Cooley; Herzig	Cooley; Herzig	3:45
3.	"Miss America"	Michaelson; Larrance Dopson; Ryan Stockbridge; Jenny Owen Youngs	Cooley; Herzig	3:32
4.	"Another Life"	Michaelson	Chris Kuffner	4:13
5.	"I Remember Her"	Michaelson	Michaelson	3:29
6.	"Drink You Gone"	Michaelson; Michael Busbee	Dan Romer	3:40
7.	"Hell No"	Michaelson; Barry Dean; Luke Laird	Cooley; Herzig	2:54
8.	"Still the One"	Michaelson; Cooley; Herzig	Cooley; Herzig	2:32
9.	"Celebrate"	Michaelson; Dean; Laird	Laird; Dean	3:29
10.	"Old Days"	Michaelson; Trent Dabbs; Dean	Romer	4:04
Total length:				35:50

Alter Egos track listing
No.	Title	Writer(s)	Producer(s)	Length
1.	"Whole Lot of Heart" (featuring Tegan & Sara)	Michaelson; Cooley; Herzig	Cooley; Herzig	3:35
2.	"I Remember Her" (featuring Lucius)	Michaelson	Michaelson	3:08
3.	"Drink You Gone" (featuring John Paul White)	Michaelson; Busbee	Romer	3:44
4.	"Miss America" (featuring Sara Bareilles)	Michaelson; Dopson; Stockbridge; Youngs	Cooley; Herzig	3:39
5.	"Celebrate" (featuring AJR)	Michaelson; Dean; Laird	Laird; Dean	3:17
Total length:				17:25

== Personnel ==
Credits adapted from AllMusic.

Musicians

- Ingrid Michaelson – piano, vocals
- Butterfly Boucher – bass guitar
- Tyler Burkum – electric guitar
- Cason Cooley – electric guitar, keyboards, piano
- Jonathan Dinklage – viola, violin
- Dave Eggar – cello
- Katie Herzig – keyboards, background vocals
- Chris Kuffner – bass guitar, guitar, synthesizer
- Billy Libby – guitar
- Tony Lucido – bass guitar
- Jeremy Lutito – drums
- Saul Simon MacWilliams – drums, synthesizer
- Dan Romer – drums
- Adele Stein – cello
- Ben Thornewill – piano

Technical personnel

- Ingrid Michaelson – producer
- Chris Athens – mastering
- David Boman – engineer
- Michaela Bosch – paintings
- Cason Cooley – producer, programming
- Barry Dean – vocal producer
- Serban Ghenea – mixing
- Ryan Gore – vocal engineer
- Lynn Grossman – A&R
- John Hanes – engineer
- Katie Herzig – producer, programming
- Mary Hooper – package design
- Chris Kuffner – engineer, producer, programming
- Shervin Lainez – photography
- Luke Laird – producer, programming
- Nick Lobel – mixing assistant
- Saul Simon MacWilliams – engineer
- Buckley Miller – bass engineer, drum engineering
- Sean Moffitt – mixing
- Ken Rich – engineer, piano engineer
- Bess Rogers – engineer
- Dan Romer – engineer, producer
- F. Reid Shippen – mixing

== Charts ==
Weekly chart performance for It Doesn't Have to Make Sense
Chart (2016)	Peak position
Canadian Albums (Billboard)	78
US Billboard 200	19
US Digital Albums (Billboard)	10
US Independent Albums (Billboard)	3

== Release history ==
It Doesn't Have to Make Sense release history
Region	Date	Format(s)	Label(s)	Ref.
United States	August 26, 2016	CD; digital download; vinyl	Cabin 24; Mom + Pop	
