= Lucia Hierro =

Dominican American multimedia artist

- Born: Lucia Hierro; 1987 (age 38–39); New York, US
- Education: State University of New York at Purchase, New York (B.F.A.); Yale School of Art, Connecticut (M.F.A.)
- Occupation: Visual artist
- Known for: Paintings, sculptures, collages

Lucia Hierro (born Dec 02, 1987, New York Presbyterian) is a Dominican American multimedia artist known for soft-assemblage, painting, sculpture, and digital media collages that represent the intersectionality between Dominican American identity, capitalism, and community through a culturally relevant lens. Her most notable works infuse "bodega aesthetics" with pop art, minimalism and Dutch still life styles. She has a studio in South Bronx.

== Biography ==
Lucia Hierro was raised in Washington Heights and Inwood, home to Dominican diasporas in New York. Her parents, both Dominican immigrants, were artistically inclined: Her father was a singer-songwriter and her mother a vocalist.

Hierro decided to pursue art in high school and began taking free classes at Cooper Union through the Saturday Program. She received a Bachelor's of Fine Arts in Painting & Drawing from the School of Art & Design at Purchase College in 2010. In 2013, she completed a Masters of Fine Arts in Painting/Printmaking from Yale School of Art.

== Career ==
Lucia Hierro trained as a painter. She began working with fabrics (felt) after her formal art education. Hierro had not considered fabric as a medium because she associated it with labor and her family. Hierro's family had survived in New York as fabric factory workers. Once she found out that her grandma had dreamed of being a fashion designer, she felt empowered to reclaim the medium.

Hierro collaborates with Art of Change to make prints of her works and donate the profits to United We Dream, an immigrant youth network.

== Works ==
=== Mercado Series, (2014-) ===
The Mercado series was seen Hierro's first solo gallery show. It was shown in the Elizabeth Dee Gallery in 2018. The series originally consisted of large-scale transparent tote bags filled with hand-sewn soft-assemblage structures of novelties familiar to Dominican American communities. The series now includes the same materials found in large-scale single use plastic bags.

The Mercado series serves to highlight the relationship between [Dominican] individuals and capitalism. Hierro's original inspiration comes from the relationship immigrant Dominicans held with objects from their native land. Hierro's mother and grandmother would often bring souvenirs back from the DR at the request of nostalgic New York community members. Furthermore, as an artist at the intersection between the Dominican and American identity, Hierro envisioned the Mercado bags as marking the exchange between her cultures and goods. As such, Hierro's pieces touch on how marketing actively shapes and is shaped by identities. With familiar groceries, bodega items, and cultural reminders in the bags serve as relatable portraits of the community.

=== The Gates (2021) ===
The Gates is a series of sculptural works done in collaboration with Luigi Iron Works, whose owner is a relative of Hierro. It consists of oversized, free-standing iron gates that pay tribute to the architectural elements found throughout Brooklyn and South Bronx. The Gates also nod to Jeanne-Claude and Christo's Central Park Gates project. The bags that hang on the gates demonstrate the typical state in which such gates are found in the Latinx communities in these districts. The circulars found on the gates point to the unseen labor of the many immigrants that work to distribute them throughout the neighborhood.

=== Tal Cual (September 2021-) ===
Lucia Hierro's solo show Tal Cual is currently exhibited at the Charles James Gallery in Los Angeles.

=== Marginal Costs (June 2021-January 2022) ===
Marginal Costs, located at The Aldrich Contemporary Art Museum, is Hierro's first solo museum exhibition. The exhibition includes pieces from the Mercado and the specially commissioned Gates series and wall murals. Marginal Costs is organized by The Aldrich's Senior Curator Amy Smith-Stewart.

According to Lucia, the name of her exhibition demonstrates dual meaning. The exhibition is an homage to Latinx individuals who often operate under the belief that they occupy the marginal spaces of the economy while fully participating in the market. On a larger-scale, the works act as critique to late-stage capitalism and the social, political, and environmental costs to its production.

Marginal Costs is composed of three main components: the Mercado Series, the Gates Series, and wall murals. One wall mural depicts a collage of vinyl decals, including flower bouquets, a prayer card, a Hennessy bottle, a milk crate, and a Jesus statue, cradled atop one another. This mural depicts a sidewalk shrine. Created during the COVID-19 pandemic, Lucia dedicated this shrine to the people, disproportionately BIPOC, that have passed because of the illness. Hierro mentions noticing shrines and/or flowers at almost every building in her community inspired the work. The other mural is an homage to the resilience of Hierro's community during the COVID-19 pandemic, particularly in reference to street vendors. The colorful wall is filled with images Hierro photographed on walks throughout her community – street food carts, for lease signs, and outdoor boutiques among others.

=== Objetos Especificos (2019) ===
Objetos Específicos was curated by Joseph Wolin and showcased in Sean Horton and included sculptures, vinyl decal collages and Anchoring, a specially commissioned mural4.

The exhibition is a nod to Donald Judd's "Specific Objects" essay. The essay touches on minimalism, and especially on spare, repetitive forms. Throughout Hierro's exhibition, it is apparent that the artist incorporates the minimalism style as vinyl decals and sculptures are stand alone and sparsed throughout the exhibit. However, the pieces also go against the narrative as they infuse very branded and obvious pop-art elements.

=== Vecinos/Neighbors (2020) ===
Lucia Hierro's solo exhibition Vecinos/Neighbors was exhibited under Primary Projects in Miami, Florida.

=== The Cost of Living (2019) ===
Lucia Hierro's solo exhibition The Cost of Living was exhibited at the Wallworks Galley in collaboration with Latchkey Gallery in Bronx, New York.

=== Aqui y Alla (2018) ===
Lucia Hierro's solo exhibition Aqui y Alla was curated by Luis Graham and exhibited at the Casa Quien Gallery in Santo Domingo, Dominican Republic.

== Exhibitions ==
- Mercado. 27 January – 10 March 2018. Elizabeth Dee Gallery, New York. Curated by Larry Ossei-Mensah.
- Marginal Costs. 7 June 2021 – 2 January 2022. The Aldrich Contemporary Art Museum, Ridgefield, CT

== Notable works in public collections ==
- Can I Borrow a Cup of Sugar (2020), Pérez Art Museum Miami
