= Mary Ruth Ray =

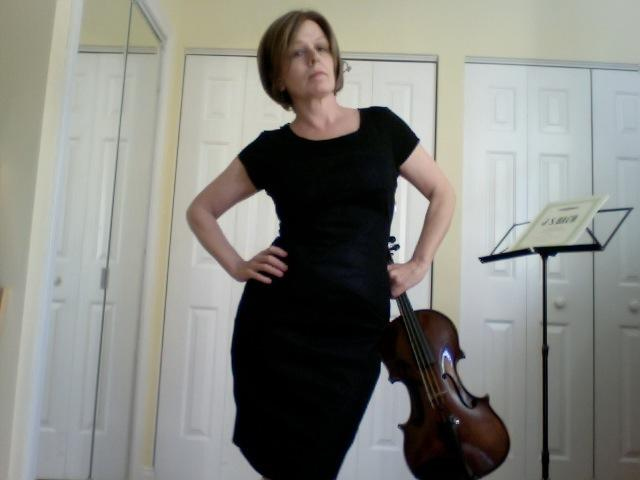

Background information
- Born: October 17, 1956; Knoxville, Tennessee, US
- Died: January 29, 2013 (aged 56) Brookline, Massachusetts, US
- Genres: Classical
- Occupations: University professor, violist
- Instrument: Viola
- Years active: 1973–2013

Mary Ruth Ray (1956–2013) was an internationally known classical musician who received critical acclaim throughout the United States, Europe and Russia.

== Career ==
Ray was a faculty member at Brandeis University where she taught viola and chamber music from 1980 to 2013. She was appointed Chair of the Music Department at Brandeis in 2005 and held that position for eight years.

As co-founder and violist of the Lydian String Quartet she was awarded prizes at competitions in France, England and Canada, and was a 1984 winner of the Naumburg Award for Excellence in Chamber Music. During her 33-year career she performed at such world-class venues as Carnegie Hall, Alice Tully Hall at Lincoln Center and the Library of Congress.

She performed as guest artist with the Boston Symphony Orchestra, the Fromm Series at Harvard University, the Boston Modern Orchestra Project, the Bard Music Festival, Apple Hill Center for Chamber Music, Boston Musica Viva, Juneau Jazz and Classics, and was invited to present a featured concert/demonstration of the Bach Cello Suites for the 13th International Viola Congress.

As a member and soloist with Emmanuel Music in Boston, she performed the complete cycle of over two hundred sacred cantatas by J.S. Bach as well as chamber music of Debussy, Brahms, Schubert, Schumann, and John Harbison on its acclaimed "encyclopedic exploration of great composers" series.

Ray was a recording artist with CRI, Nonesuch, Centaur, Harmonia Mundi, New World, and Tzadik Records. Several of her 30-plus recordings with the Lydian String Quartet were chosen "Best of the Year" by The New York Times.

Ray also played on the motion picture soundtrack recording of Saving Private Ryan (composed and conducted by John Williams), and appeared on screen as violist-performer in the movie Yes, Giorgio (starring Luciano Pavarotti, with the Boston Pops Orchestra).

== Personal life ==
Ray was a graduate of the State University of New York at Purchase. She was known to friends and colleagues as "Violet," "Vi" and "U.V." She married violist Leonard Matczynski in 1978 and had a son.

== Death ==
She died from breast cancer at age 56 on January 29, 2013.
