= Maybe (Ingrid Michaelson song) =

2009 indie pop single

Single by Ingrid Michaelson

from the album Everybody
- Released: July 14, 2009
- Recorded: 2009
- Genre: Indie pop
- Length: 3:12
- Label: Cabin 24 Records
- Songwriter(s): Ingrid Michaelson

Ingrid Michaelson singles chronology
"Winter Song" (2008)	"Maybe" (2009)	"Parachute" (2010)

"Maybe" is the first single off Ingrid Michaelson's fourth studio album, Everybody. The song was featured on the ABC medical drama Body of Proof in the episode "Society Hill", the sixth episode of the first season. It was also used in Season 4 of the USA network show In Plain Sight in the episode "I'm a Liver, Not a Fighter," at the end of "The Glades" Season 3 Episode 2 ("Poseidon Adventure"), and in a Hair Cuttery commercial.

== Reviews ==
Billboard stated that:

The last track to make it onto Ingrid Michaelson's upcoming album, "Maybe" gets off to a melancholy start but quickly takes off thanks to resonant lyrics. Over a radio-friendly chorus, the singer resolves to embrace the uncertainty around her faltering relationship. "The only way to really know, is to really let it go," she concludes, moments after hoping for a romantic comeback. The production continues to build until two-thirds of the way through the song, when it abruptly strips down to a single layer of vocals accompanied by fragile guitar strums. This 10-second ease illuminates the sincerity in Michaelson's voice. Then the optimistic hook takes off again, and it becomes clear that the song's duality is all too reminiscent of real-life affairs. Much like her approach to music, Michaelson's love story is strong, risky and mature.

== Charts ==
Chart (2009–10)	Peak position
Germany (GfK)	97
US Bubbling Under Hot 100 Singles (Billboard)	9
US Adult Alternative Songs (Billboard)	2
US Adult Contemporary (Billboard)	27
US Adult Pop Airplay (Billboard)	14
US Hot Rock & Alternative Songs (Billboard)	38
