= The Way I Am (Ingrid Michaelson song) =

Single by Ingrid Michaelson

from the album Girls and Boys
- Released: September 18, 2007 (U.S.)
- Recorded: 2006
- Genre: Indie folk
- Length: 2:15
- Label: Cabin 24
- Songwriter: Ingrid Michaelson
- Producer: Ingrid Michaelson

Ingrid Michaelson singles chronology
"The Way I Am" (2007)	"Be OK" (2008)

Music video
- "The Way I Am" on YouTube

"The Way I Am" is a song written by Ingrid Michaelson on her 2006 album Girls and Boys. It is one of her platinum hits.

== Music video ==
The song's music video was directed by Autumn de Wilde. It depicts Michaelson dancing with a man (played by Greg Laswell, whom Michaelson would later marry) in a gymnasium where everyone present, except for Michaelson, is a clown or mime. Other dancers glare at Michaelson and she runs from the dance to a bathroom, where she uses lipstick to give her reflection the appearance of a clown nose, and then labels herself a "freak." Her dance partner, a clown, has followed her and embraces her when she emerges from the bathroom. They share a kiss and leave together.

== Chart performance ==
The song debuted on the Billboard Hot 100 at #80 on October 4, 2007, and peaked at #37. The single benefited from the exposure through its use in a national television ad campaign for Old Navy sweaters. On the Canadian Hot 100, "The Way I Am" peaked at #51. It has been certified Platinum by the RIAA and has sold 1.6 million copies in the United States.

=== Charts ===
Chart (2007–09)	Peak position
Austria (Ö3 Austria Top 40)	36
Canada Hot 100 (Billboard)	51
Canada AC (Billboard)	23
Germany (GfK)	69
US Billboard Hot 100	37
US Adult Alternative Airplay (Billboard)	2
US Adult Contemporary (Billboard)	20
US Adult Pop Airplay (Billboard)	15

=== Year-end charts ===
Chart (2008)	Position
US Adult Alternative Songs (Billboard)	5
US Adult Top 40 (Billboard)	39

== Covers and media appearances ==
On September 21, 2007, Michaelson made her network television debut performing the song on Last Call with Carson Daly.

American Idol Season 9 finalist Didi Benami performed a cover of the song on the Top 12 female performances on Tuesday, February 23, 2010.

In 2013, Caroline Pennell sang the song on the fifth season of The Voice in the knockout rounds, winning widespread fame, and was deemed the front runner of the show with her performance.

The song is frequently used to demonstrate Bose Corporation products due to its deep bass and crisp vocals.
