= Stranger Songs =

2019 album by Ingrid Michaelson

Studio album by Ingrid Michaelson
- Released: June 28, 2019
- Length: 36:18
- Label: Cabin 24
- Producers: Ingrid Michaelson (exec.); Lionel Crasta; Sam de Jong; Jason Evigan; Alex Hope; Gian Stone

Ingrid Michaelson chronology
| Songs for the Season (2018) | Stranger Songs (2019) | For the Dreamers (2024) |

Singles from Stranger Songs
- 1. "Missing You" Released: May 10, 2019

Stranger Songs is the eighth studio album by American singer-songwriter Ingrid Michaelson, released on June 28, 2019, through Cabin 24 Records. It is inspired by the Netflix series Stranger Things, being released shortly prior to the premiere of the show's third season. In an interview with Entertainment Weekly, Michaelson described Stranger Songs as a "natural extension" of her work on composing music for the musical The Notebook. The lead single, "Missing You", was released on May 10, 2019.

== Critical reception ==
Professional ratings
Review scores
| Source | Rating |
|---|---|
| AllMusic | 4/5 stars |

AllMusic editor Matt Collar noted that "while the album's underpinnings do bring to mind Stranger Things's John Carpenter-style keyboard soundtrack aesthetic, much of Stranger Songs also finds Michaelson leaning more heavily into the show's more conceptual themes of romantic teenage longing and the desire for love and acceptance [..] Ultimately, as the Stranger Things kids draw strength from each other to face whatever monsters may emerge from the dark, on Stranger Songs, Michaelson offers her own words of hope for gentle freaks in an upside-down world."

== Track listing ==
Stranger Songs – Standard edition
| No. | Title | Writer(s) | Producer(s) | Length |
|---|---|---|---|---|
| 1. | "Freak Show" | Michaelson; Hailey Collier; Louis Schoorl; Peter Thomas | Schoorl; Thomas | 3:12 |
| 2. | "Young and in Love" | Michaelson; Dave Barnes; Josh Kerr; Sam de Jong | de Jong | 3:28 |
| 3. | "Hey Kid" | Michaelson; Cason Cooley; Katie Herzig | Cooley; Herzig | 3:52 |
| 4. | "Hate You" | Michaelson | Michaelson; de Jong | 3:29 |
| 5. | "Jealous" | Michaelson; Will Lobban-Bean; Casey Smith | Jason Evigan; Gian Stone; Lionel Crasta | 3:07 |
| 6. | "Missing You" | Michaelson; Jesse Thomas; de Jong | de Jong | 2:54 |
| 7. | "Best Friend" | Michaelson; Jesse Thomas; Jordan Palmer | Palmer | 2:46 |
| 8. | "Mother" | Michaelson; Cooley; Herzig | Cooley; Herzig | 3:40 |
| 9. | "Christmas Lights" | Michaelson; Cooley; Herzig | Cooley; Herzig | 3:09 |
| 10. | "Pretty" | Michaelson; Alex Hope; Sarah Aarons | Alex Hope | 2:55 |
| 11. | "Take Me Home" | Michaelson; Cooley; Herzig | Cooley; Herzig | 3:46 |
| Total length: | | | | 36:18 |

Stranger Songs – Barnes & Noble deluxe edition (bonus tracks)
| No. | Title | Writer(s) | Length |
|---|---|---|---|
| 12. | "Boy Behind the Camera" | Jeffery Lutitio, Erin Mccarley, Ingrid Michaelson | 3:58 |
| 13. | "Friends Don't Lie" | Ingrid Michaelson, Cason Cooley, Katie Herzig | 3:26 |
| Total length: | | | 43:02 |

== Charts ==
Weekly chart performance for Stranger Songs
| Chart (2019) | Peak position |
|---|---|
| US Billboard 200 | 128 |
| US Digital Albums (Billboard) | 14 |
| US Independent Albums (Billboard) | 3 |
| US Top Album Sales (Billboard) | 13 |
