= Slow the Rain =

Studio album by Ingrid Michaelson
- Released: January 10, 2005
- Recorded: 2004
- Genre: Pop
- Length: 34:43
- Labels: Cabin 24 Records (Ingrid Michaelson, self-published, self-funded)
- Producer: Ingrid Michaelson

Ingrid Michaelson chronology
Porcelain Fists EP (2003-2004)	Slow the Rain (2005)	Girls and Boys (2006)

Singles from Slow the Rain
- 1. "Porcelain Fists" Released: 2003; 2. "Around You" Released: 2004

Slow the Rain is the debut studio album and only independent album recorded by American pop singer Ingrid Michaelson. It was self-released on January 10, 2005.

== Background ==
Michaelson recorded the album while still living on Staten Island and mainly busking on lower Manhattan and on platforms of her favorite New York Transit Authority rapid transit stations (NYC's subway).

Michaelson could not find a label to sponsor her album, as she was in 2005 one of the myriad unknowns aspiring to a career in folk music in New York City and playing for hire, on subway platforms and doing an occasional open mic or gig if she could get one. She paid for the recording, mixing and physical manufacturing of the disk.

== Aftermath ==
Michaelson has said that she dislikes her debut album, saying "I really really hate it!" in 2014. However, she acknowledged that her distaste "hurts people's feelings."

== Track listing ==
All songs written and composed by Ingrid Michaelson, except where noted.

1. "Let Go" – 3:26
2. "Around You" – 4:05
3. "Charlie" – 3:39
4. "Porcelain Fists" – 3:48
5. "Morning Lullabies" – 4:15
6. "Empty Bottle" – 3:59
7. "Mosquito" – 3:51
8. "A Bird's Song" – 3:24
9. "I'll See You in My Dreams" – 4:16 (Isham Jones/Gus Kahn)

== Personnel ==
- Ingrid Michaelson - vocals, piano, producer
- Chris Kuffner – bass, guitar
- Elliot Jacobson – drums
- Joan Moore – vocals and ukulele (9)
- Mark Turrigiano – engineer, mixing, mastering, drum machine (7)
