= Cal Lane =

Canadian sculptor (born 1968)

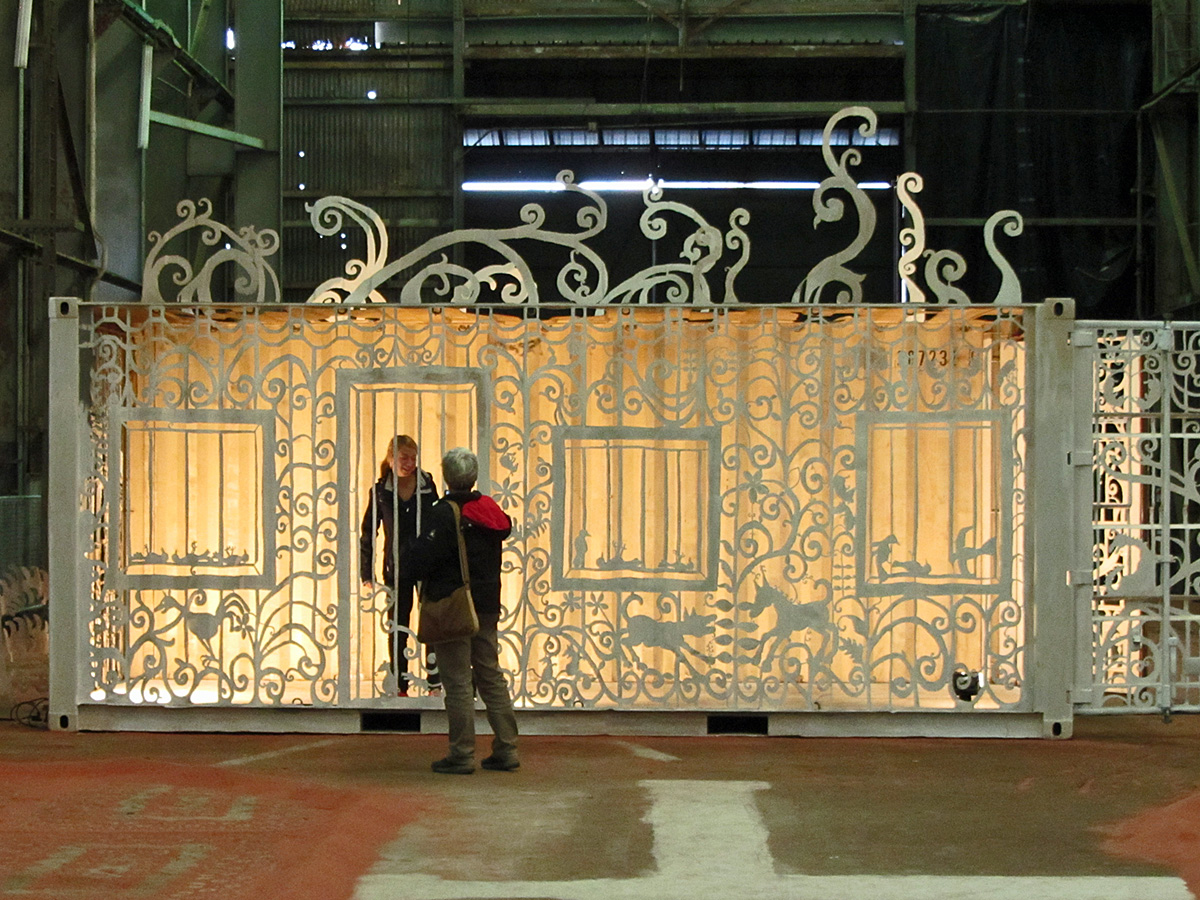
Domesticated Turf by Cal Lane.

Cal Lane (born 1968) is a Canadian sculptor, known for creating delicate, lacy sculptures out of industrial steel products.

== Early life and education ==
Lane was born in Halifax, Nova Scotia in 1968 and raised on Vancouver Island, where she trained as a hairdresser and a welder. She has a bachelor's degree from the Nova Scotia College of Art and Design and a Master of Fine Arts from the State University of New York at Purchase.

== Art ==
Cal Lane uses a plasma cutter or an oxy-acetylene torch to cut intricate patterns into industrial steel products.

Lane's work is often described in terms of dichotomy or contrast. Fred A. Bernstein wrote in The New York Times: "The work is about the contrasts between the industrial and the fanciful, the opaque and the transparent." Writing for Sculpture magazine, Robin Peck said: "The dialectic is obvious: industrial versus domestic, strong versus delicate, masculine versus feminine, functional versus decorative." Lori Zimmer wrote: "Lane enjoys pushing the dichotomy of feminine and masculine by combining patterns of domesticity with these cold, harsh symbols of masculine blue collar labor."

== Exhibitions ==
- 2004 Dirt Lace, Wynick/Tuck Gallery
- 2007 Radical Lace & Subversive Knitting Museum of Arts and Design
- 2008 DeCordova Museum and Sculpture Park
- 2010 Sweet Crude, Art Gallery of Mississauga; Southern Alberta Art Gallery
- 2015 Veiled Hoods and Stains, Yukon Arts Centre
- 2016 Sharjah Art Museum

== Selected public collections ==
- Beaverbrook Art Galery, Fredericton;"Article". beaverbrookartgallery.org. Beaverbrook Art Gallery.

== Awards ==
- 2001 International Sculpture Center's Outstanding Student Achievement in Contemporary Sculpture
- 2006 Socrates Sculpture Park Fellowship
- 2007 Joseph S. Stauffer Prize
