= Human Again =

Studio album by Ingrid Michaelson
- Released: January 24, 2012
- Genre: Indie pop
- Length: 45 minutes 59 minutes (with 4 hidden track)
- Label: Cabin 24; Mom + Pop Music
- Producer: David Kahne

Ingrid Michaelson chronology
Everybody (2009)	Human Again (2012)	Lights Out (2014)

Singles from Human Again
- 1. "Ghost" Released: November 15, 2011; 2. "Blood Brothers" Released: July 15, 2012; 3. "Fire" Released: November 4, 2012

Human Again is the fourth studio album by the American singer-songwriter Ingrid Michaelson. The album was released on January 24, 2012, by Cabin 24 Records and Mom + Pop Music. The first single from the album, "Ghost", was released on November 15, 2011.

== Background ==
In a 2011 interview, Michaelson spoke about the album, saying, "It's coming along really well. We were hoping to have everything done by now, and we're not at all done. I keep writing more songs, so that's kind of a good thing, because I keep creating new things, and that's what's halting the process, because we have to go in and record that song. It's been a long, arduous process, but the harder you work on something, the prouder you are of it."

On Tuesday, November 15, Michaelson announced the release date, as well as the album's first single, "Ghost", and unveiled the cover artwork.

The cover artwork was painted by Joe Sorren specifically for the album.

Michaelson promoted the album by going on tour in spring 2012. She also performed live on the Macy's Thanksgiving Day Parade.

The title of the album comes from the lyrics of the song "Palm of Your Hand", in which Michaelson sings, "You make me/wanna be a human again/Can I be your only human again."

== Promotion ==
Michaelson made several television appearances to promote the album. She appeared on Live! with Kelly performing "Ghost", on the Macy's Thanksgiving Day Parade performing "Blood Brothers" and on Conan performing "Blood Brothers" and "Ghost". In support of the album, she went on the Human Again tour, performing on several legs across America as well as in Europe and Australia.

== Critical reception ==
Professional ratings
Aggregate scores
Source	Rating
Metacritic	70/100
Review scores
Source	Rating
Entertainment Weekly	4/5 stars
AbsolutePunk	89/100
Consequence of Sound	3.5/5 stars
The Boston Globe	80/100
AllMusic	3.5/5 stars

Human Again received positive reviews and holds a 70-point score on Metacritic, which aggregates reviews into average scores out of 100, indicating a positive reception. Entertainment Weekly gave the album 83 out of 100. Review website Consequence of Sound gave the album 3 1/2 out of 5 stars, saying that Michaelson's "vocal abilities are as strong as ever". AllMusic gave the album 4 out of 5 stars. Consider magazine gave the album a score of 8 out of 10.

== Track listing ==
All songs written and composed by Ingrid Michaelson.

No.	Title	Length
1.	"Fire"	3:20
2.	"This Is War"	3:19
3.	"Do It Now"	3:16
4.	"I'm Through"	3:27
5.	"Blood Brothers"	3:12
6.	"Black and Blue"	3:37
7.	"Ribbons"	3:27
8.	"How We Love"	3:33
9.	"Palm of Your Hand"	3:11
10.	"Ghost"	4:01
11.	"In the Sea"	3:18
12.	"Keep Warm"	3:18
13.	"End of the World"	3:42

iTunes Edition
No.	Title	Length
14.	"Save Me"	2:24
15.	"Always You"	2:12

Barnes & Noble Exclusive Edition
No.	Title	Length
14.	"This Is War" (Home Recording)	3:25
15.	"Keep Warm" (Home Recording)	3:27

Deluxe Edition
No.	Title	Length
16.	"Live It With Love"	3:03

== Personnel ==
- David Kahne - guitar, bass, keyboards
- Chris Kuffner - bass guitar, guitar, tenor guitar
- Elliot Jacobson - drums
- Rusty Anderson - guitar
- Shawn Pelton - drums ("Black and Blue", "Ghost")
- Allie Moss - backing vocals ("Blood Brothers", "In The Sea")
- Bess Rogers - backing vocals ("Blood Brothers", "In The Sea")
- Jason Slater - additional programming ("Black and Blue")
- Che Pope - additional programming ("Black and Blue")

== Charts ==
Weekly chart performance for Human Again
Chart (2012)	Peak position
Canadian Albums (Billboard)	22
US Billboard 200	5
US Independent Albums (Billboard)	1
