= Allie Moss =

American singer-songwriter

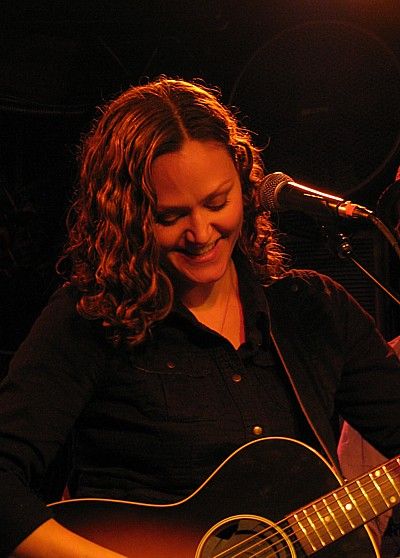
- Allie Moss on stage at The Saint in Asbury Park, NJ, April 2011

Background information
- Origin: Cape May, New Jersey, U.S.
- Genres: Indie, folk, alternative music, pop
- Occupation(s): Singer, songwriter, musician
- Instrument(s): Vocals, guitar
- Years active: 2005–present
- Website: alliemoss.com

Allie Moss is an American singer-songwriter and guitarist from Jersey Shore. She released her own EP entitled Passerby in 2009. In 2011, Moss released her debut album Late Bloomer. She regularly performs as a guitarist and backup vocalist for singer/songwriter and friend Ingrid Michaelson. While not performing on Michaelson's 2010 European tour, Moss returned to the fold during the summer of 2010 for a US tour.

Moss is probably best known in the UK for her song "Corner" which has been used for a television commercial for BT Infinity, its broadband internet service. The single reached number 70 in the UK.

Her song "Something to Hold Onto" was featured on the TV show Bones episode "The Feet on the Beach". Her song "Corner" was featured on Pretty Little Liars episode "It's Alive" and on episode 4.01 of the NBC series Parenthood "Family Portrait".

== Collaborations ==
In 2016 she released an EP featuring 3-part harmonies with Bess Rogers and Hannah Winkler titled Allie, Bess & Hannah Sing.

== Discography ==
Passerby EP (2009)

No.	Title	Writer(s)	Length
1.	"Corner"	Allie Moss	3:49
2.	"Let It Go"	Moss, Rob Seals	3:04
3.	"Prisoner of Hope"	Moss, Seals	4:10
4.	"Days I Regret"	Moss	2:56
5.	"Passerby"	Moss, Seals	4:55
6.	"Something to Hold Onto"	Moss	3:19
7.	"Rally"	Moss	3:34

Christmas Tidings Holiday EP (2011)

No.	Title	Length
1.	"God Rest Ye Merry Gentlemen"	2:46
2.	"The First Noel"	2:08
3.	"Auld Lang Syne"	2:10

Late Bloomer (2011)

No.	Title	Writer(s)	Length
1.	"Corner"	Allie Moss	3:49
2.	"Dig With Me"	Moss, & Rob Seals	3:56
3.	"Melancholy Astronautic Man"	Moss, Seals	2:31
4.	"Late Bloomer"	Allie Moss & Jon Titterington	4:10
5.	"Let It Go"	Moss, Seals	3:04
6.	"Something to Hold on To"	Moss	3:16
7.	"Leave It All Behind"	Moss, Nate Campany, Greg Holden	3:10
8.	"Rally"	Moss	3:28
9.	"Days I Regret"	Moss	2:52
10.	"Passerby"	Moss, Seals	4:54
11.	"Prisoner of Hope" (Bonus track)	Moss, Seals	4:30
12.	"Make Your Move" (Bonus track)	Moss, Holden	2:42
13.	"Anywhere to Find You" (Bonus track)	Moss, Seals	3:10
14.	"Way With Words" (Bonus track)	Moss	4:21

The Other Side EP (2016)

No.	Title	Writer(s)	Length
1.	"Bet My Life"	Allie Moss	4:18
2.	"Sorry Now"	Moss	3:01
3.	"Young Love"	Moss	3:57
4.	"Cut My Losses"	Moss	4:14
5.	"Turning to Gold"	Allie Moss, Garrison Starr & Bill Lefler	3:46

=== Singles ===
Released	Single	Writer(s)	Length	Label
January 11, 2010	"Dig With Me"	Allie Moss & Rob Seals	3:55	Self-release
January 11, 2010	"Melancholy Astronautic Man"	Allie Moss & Rob Seals	2:31	Self-release
November 15, 2011	"God Rest Ye Merry Gentlemen"		2:46	
November 15, 2011	"The First Noel"		2:08	
November 15, 2011	"Auld Lang Syne"		2:10	
August 11, 2012	"Bye Bye Love" (with Bess Rogers)	Felice and Boudleaux Bryant	2:27	
December 8, 2013	"Deck the Halls"		1:30	

=== Collaborations ===
Allie, Bess, & Hannah Sing EP (2016)

No.	Title	Writer(s)	Length
1.	"Because"	Lennon & McCartney	2:28
2.	"Dreams"	Stevie Nicks	3:21
3.	"Hearts Awake"	Allie Moss, Bess Rogers and Hannah Winkler	3:30
4.	"God Only Knows"	Brian Wilson and Tony Asher	2:38
5.	"Hard to Be"	David Bazan	4:14
6.	"Day After Day"	Bess Rogers and Chris Kuffner	5:15
7.	"Losers"	The Belle Brigade	3:51

=== Compilations ===
Year	Song	Album	Notes
2006	"Way With Words"	Other Songs and Dances, Vol. 1	Writer: Allie Moss; Length: 3:58; Label: Backlight Records; Genres: Easy listening, folk, pop; Release: May 20, 2006
