= For the Dreamers =

2024 album by Ingrid Michaelson

Studio album by Ingrid Michaelson
- Released: August 23, 2024
- Length: 36:21
- Label: Cabin 24
- Producer: Juan Ariza; Anna Schulze; Amy Stroup

Ingrid Michaelson chronology
Stranger Songs (2019)	For the Dreamers (2024)

For the Dreamers is the ninth studio album by American singer-songwriter Ingrid Michaelson. It was released on August 23, 2024 through Michaelson's own label Cabin 24 Records.

== Commercial performance ==
For the Dreamers debuted and peaked at number 20 on the US Top Jazz Albums chart. It also reached number 15 on Billboard's Traditional Jazz Albums chart.

== Track listing ==
For the Dreamers track listing
No.	Title	Writer(s)	Producer(s)	Length
1.	"Wait There for Me"	Ingrid Michaelson; Juan Ariza	Ariza	3:13
2.	"Love Is" (with Jason Mraz)	Michaelson; Ariza; Nicole "Kole" Cohen	Ariza	2:35
3.	"We Belong"	Michaelson; Ariza; Trent Dabbs; Nick Lobel	Ariza	3:16
4.	"A Dream Is a Wish Your Heart Makes" (with Sneha)	Mack David; Al Hoffman; Jerry Livingston	Ariza	2:29
5.	"If This Is Love" (For the Dreamers version)	Michaelson	Ariza	3:37
6.	"What a Wonderful World"	Bob Thiele; George David Weiss	Ariza	2:27
7.	"Grow Up"	Michaelson	Ariza	2:56
8.	"Only You" (with Juan Ariza)	Michaelson; Ariza	Ariza	3:08
9.	"You Make Me Feel So Young"	Josef Myrow; Mack Gordon	Ariza	2:48
10.	"Hallelujah"	Michaelson	Ariza	3:09
11.	"It Never Ends"	Michaelson; Amy Stroup; Anna Schulze	Ariza; Stroup; Schulze	3:59
12.	"Backyard"	Michaelson; Ariza	Ariza	2:40
Total length:				36:21

== Charts ==
Weekly chart performance for For the Dreamers
Chart (2024)	Peak position
US Top Jazz Albums (Billboard)	20

== Release history ==
For the Dreamers release history
Region	Date	Format	Label	Ref(s)
Various	August 23, 2024	CD; digital download; streaming	Cabin 24	
