= Kevin Wada =

American comic artist

- Born: March 9 Los Angeles, United States
- Notable works: Scarlet Witch; She-Hulk

Kevin Wada is an American watercolor painter and comics artist. Wada gained popularity as a fan artist, illustrating characters from Marvel Comics and DC Comics wearing high fashion. He now works as a comic cover artist. In 2015, he re-designed the Marvel Comics character Scarlet Witch. Wada currently resides in San Francisco, California.

== Early life and education ==
Kevin Wada was born on March 9 in the greater Los Angeles area. He was raised in the San Gabriel Valley, then attended the California College of Arts in San Francisco. He is gay and of Asian descent. His work is influenced by comic artist Bill Sienkiewicz.

== Career ==
Kevin Wada first gained attention for his reimagining of the women of X-men in fashion illustrations. Now, he works with Marvel Comics and DC Comics, and has been credited in 87 issues, which includes works like She-Hulk.

=== Work on Scarlet Witch ===
Kevin Wada's work with Emily Shaw on Scarlet Witch included a significant redesign in her character and appearance. Wada's initial goal in redesigning Scarlet Witch was to make her "luxuriously goth and darkly romantic. Something modern and glamorous and fashiony," but these initial designs were moderated as design continued.
