= Winter Song (Sara Bareilles and Ingrid Michaelson song) =

2008 single by Sara Bareilles and Ingrid Michaelson

Single by Sara Bareilles featuring Ingrid Michaelson

from the album The Hotel Café Presents Winter Songs
- Released: December 2008
- Recorded: 2008
- Genre: Christmas; indie folk
- Length: 4:10
- Label: Epic
- Songwriters: Sara Bareilles; Ingrid Michaelson

Sara Bareilles singles chronology
"Bottle It Up" (2008)	"Winter Song" (2008)	"Gravity" (2009)

Ingrid Michaelson singles chronology
"Be OK" (2008)	"Winter Song" (2008)	"Maybe" (2009)

Music video
- "Winter Song" on YouTube

"Winter Song" is a seasonal song co-written and co-sung as a duet by American singers Sara Bareilles and Ingrid Michaelson. Although considered by many to be a Christmas song, no explicit reference to the holiday can be found in its lyrics. It appeared on the holiday compilation album The Hotel Café Presents Winter Songs by various female artists, released in 2008 through Epic Records. It became a minor hit in Canada in 2008, reaching number 97. Upon release in Ireland in 2011, it reached number two for two weeks. A special charity single by #twitterxmassingle was also a separate hit in Ireland alongside the original version, reaching number eight.

== Twitterxmassingle version ==
"Winter Song"

Single by Twitterxmassingle
- Released: December 4, 2011
- Recorded: November 27, 2011
- Studio: Ian Callanan Studios (instrumentation); The Westin Hotel (Dublin, Ireland) (choir and soloists)
- Label: Holles Street Neonatal Unit
- Songwriters: Sara Bareilles; Ingrid Michaelson

Music video
- "Winter Song" on YouTube

The song (full name on single sleeve Twitterers and the Twitterettes of the Parish of Twitter Proudly Present Winter Song) became a charity single in Ireland released simultaneously with the original.

The idea started with a single tweet from account holder @BrendaDrumm on the social networking site Twitter on 19 November 2011. An account was established at #twitterxmassingle to garner support for the idea. The co-writers also supported the project. 140 people from Ireland took part in recording it in a grand hall in Westin Hotel in Dublin on one Sunday on 27 November 2011 exactly one week from the tweet. The instrumentation was recorded at Ian Callanan Studios, with Callanan as producer and musical director, Brenda Drumm as executive producer and Paul Keegan as engineer and mixing.

The single (also known as the "TWinter Song") and the accompanying video were launched on an independent label on 4 December 2011 and through iTunes downloads. The single entered the Irish Singles Chart at number eight on the chart dated December 8, 2011, while the original by Sara Bareilles and Ingrid Michaelson rose to number two the same week. All proceeds of the charity recording went to the Neonatal Unit of Holles Street Hospital in Dublin, Ireland.

== Credits and personnel ==
- Composers – Sara Bareilles and Ingrid Michaelson
- Artist – TwitterXMasSingle
- Label – Holles Street Neonatal Unit
- Executive producer – Brenda Drumm
- Producer – Ian Callanan
- Arranged by Ian Callanan
- Instrumentalists:
  - Piano – Anne Cullen
  - Bass – Paddy Kiernan
  - Synthesizer and programming – Ian Callanan
  - Bodhrán, whistles and Uilleann pipes – Darragh Ó Héiligh
  - Guitar – David Byrne
  - Violin – Christopher Edwards
  - Viola – Nicola Bermingham
  - Cello – Róisín Magee
- Instrumentation recorded at Ian Callanan Studios engineered by Ian Callanan
- Choir and soloists recorded at The Westin Hotel, Dublin on Sunday 27 November 2011, engineered by Paul Keegan
- Choir director – Ian Callanan
- Mixed by Paul Keegan at Retreat Recording Studio

== Charts ==
=== Sara Bareilles and Ingrid Michaelson version ===
Chart performance for "Winter Song" by Sara Bareilles and Ingrid Michaelson
Chart (2008–2011)	Peak position
Canada Hot 100 (Billboard)	97
Ireland (IRMA)	2

=== Twitterxmassingle version ===
Chart performance for "Winter Song" by Twitterxmassingle
Chart (2011)	Peak position
Ireland (IRMA)	8

== In popular culture ==
- The song was also performed during the 2010 United States National Christmas Tree Lighting, attended by the American President Barack Obama with the United States Coast Guard Band playing with Bareilles and Michaelson singing live.
- Irish O_{2} telecommunications company used the original version by Bareilles and Michaelson in their Christmas ad campaign in 2011.
- The song was featured in Scrubs Season 8 episode "My Chief Concern", at the end of the episode.
- The song was used in fifth season of Grey's Anatomy.
- The song was used in the fourth season of Brothers & Sisters.
- The song was used in multiple teasers for the third season of American Horror Story.
- The song was sampled by John Legend for his song "The Beginning..." from his 2013 album Love in the Future
- The song was covered by Ronan Keating on his album "Winter Songs"
- The song was used in the season six episode "Christmas Through Your Eyes" of The Vampire Diaries.
- The song was used in TnT's Snowpiercer in Season 2 Episode 9. The song was sung by actor Sam Otto, portraying character John Osweiller.
- Heavy metal band Halford, solo project of Judas Priest frontman Rob Halford, recorded a version of the song for the 2009 album Halford III: Winter Songs.
- British female vocalist Kim Wilde recorded a version of the song on her 2013 holiday album Wilde Winter Songbook.
- French Canadian artist, Celine Dion covered the song during a Facebook Live event on her official page, December 1, 2016.
- The song was used in the 2018 The CW reboot of Charmed episode "Jingle Hell", at the end of the episode.
- The song was used for an exhibition program by World Champion figure skater Michelle Kwan in her final year of professional skating.
- Broadway performer Leslie Odom Jr. recorded a duet version with Cynthia Erivo for his second holiday album The Christmas Album in 2020 after including a solo version on 2014's Simply Christmas.
- The song was featured on the holiday album of the cast of the musical "Hadestown," "If the Fates Allow" in 2020.
- The song was covered by Zara Larsson on her 2023 EP "Honor the Light"
- In 2025 the song was played in the final minutes of the 107th episode of the ZDF (German public television) series "die Bergretter"
