= Bess Rogers =

- Born: Long Island, New York, U.S.
- Origin: New York City, New York, U.S.
- Occupations: Singer; songwriter
- Years active: 2004–present
- Website: bessrogers.bandcamp.com

Bess Rogers is an American indie rock musician from New York City.

== Early life and education ==
Rogers was born into a musical family on Long Island, New York, and attended the Conservatory of Music at the State University of New York at Purchase for recording and composition.

== Career ==
Bess Rogers has released three full-length albums, two EPs, and several individual song releases. She has released official music videos for four songs: Math and Science, Come Home, Favorite Day, and I Don't Worry. She regularly tours nationally and internationally, plays at venues on the Lower East Side of Manhattan, and maintains a blog. In 2012, Rogers' submission was selected from among a group of more 80 entries to update the classic Cheerios jingle "The One and Only."

In addition to her solo work, she has several side projects. Most notably, she was part of the backup band for indie rocker Ingrid Michaelson. In 2013 she formed the band The Secret Someones with Hannah Winkler, Lelia Broussard, and Zach Jones. She is also a member of the orchestral/electronic groups The Age of Rockets and The Robot Explosion.

== Collaborations ==
In 2016 Bess released an EP featuring 3-part harmonies with Allie Moss and Hannah Winkler titled Allie, Bess & Hannah Sing.

== Discography ==
Decisions Based on Information (2007)

No.	Title	Writer(s)	Length
1.	"You and Me"	Bess Rogers	2:42
2.	"I Would Never"	Bess Rogers	2:57
3.	"Modern Man"	Bess Rogers	3:58
4.	"Undone"	Bess Rogers	3:05
5.	"Sunday"	Bess Rogers	4:47
6.	"Only One"	Bess Rogers	3:47
7.	"Earthquake"	Bess Rogers	4:59
8.	"Waltz Me"	Bess Rogers	2:80
9.	"Notice"	Bess Rogers	3:20
10.	"See Me? See You!"	Bess Rogers	3:15

Travel Back EP (2009)

No.	Title	Writer(s)	Length
1.	"Everything to Lose"	Bess Rogers	3:12
2.	"Travel Back"	Bess Rogers	3:28
3.	"Yellow Bird"	Bess Rogers	2:15
4.	"Dirty Lies"	Bess Rogers	3:47
5.	"Bulldozer"	Bess Rogers	2:51
6.	"I Don't Worry"	Bess Rogers	3:50

Bess Rogers presents Bess Rogers EP (2010)

No.	Title	Writer(s)	Length
1.	"Come Home"	Bess Rogers	3:46
2.	"What We Want"	Bess Rogers	3:40
3.	"Good Enough"	Bess Rogers	4:07
4.	"Favorite Day"	Bess Rogers	2:57
5.	"All In Good Fun"	Bess Rogers	4:04

Bess Rogers Presents: Songs Other People Wrote EP (2010)

No.	Title	Writer(s)	Length
1.	"Found Out About You"	Doug Hopkins	4:11
2.	"Once in a Lifetime"	D. Byrne, C. Frantz, B. Eno, J. Harrison, and T. Weymouth	4:13
3.	"Everything Means Nothing to Me"	Elliott Smith	2:36
4.	"Rock of Ages"	Gillian Welch and David Rawlings	3:26

Out of the Ocean (2011)

No.	Title	Writer(s)	Length
1.	"One Step Free"	Bess Rogers	0:46
2.	"Standing Tall"	Bess Rogers	3:46
3.	"Weak Link"	Bess Rogers	3:42
4.	"Math and Science"	Bess Rogers and Chris Kuffner	3:52
5.	"Anchor"	Bess Rogers	3:59
6.	"In the Waves"	Bess Rogers	4:06
7.	"Water and Dirt"	Bess Rogers	3:33
8.	"The Fittest"	Bess Rogers	4:32
9.	"I'll Be Gone"	Bess Rogers	3:50
10.	"Second Chance"	Bess Rogers	3:51
11.	"Brick by Brick"	Bess Rogers	4:06

=== Singles ===
Released	Single	Writer(s)	Length
May 3, 2011	"We Believe In You"		2:32
August 23, 2011	"Anchor"	Bess Rogers	3:59
August 23, 2011	"In My Life"	Lennon & McCartney	2:57
June 25, 2012	"The Perfect Day"	Bess Rogers & Chris Kuffner	2:47
August 11, 2012	"Bye Bye Love" (with Allie Moss)	Felice and Boudleaux Bryant	2:27
May 24, 2016	"Can't Remember Where"	Bess Rogers	4:08
May 24, 2016	"Day After Day"	Bess Rogers & Chris Kuffner	5:18
May 24, 2016	"Found Out About You"	D. Hopkins	4:13

=== Collaborations ===
Allie, Bess, & Hannah Sing EP (2016)

No.	Title	Writer(s)	Length
1.	"Because"	Lennon & McCartney	2:28
2.	"Dreams"	Stevie Nicks	3:21
3.	"Hearts Awake"	Allie Moss, Bess Rogers and Hannah Winkler	3:30
4.	"God Only Knows"	Brian Wilson and Tony Asher	2:38
5.	"Hard to Be"	David Bazan	4:14
6.	"Day After Day"	Bess Rogers and Chris Kuffner	5:15
7.	"Losers"	The Belle Brigade	3:51

== Production ==
Bess' first three records, Decisions Based on Information, Travel Back and Bess Rogers Presents Bess Rogers, were produced by Dan Romer. "Out of the Ocean" was produced by her husband and fellow Ingrid Michaelson band member Chris Kuffner.

== See also ==
- List of people from New York
- List of State University of New York at Purchase people
- List of singer-songwriters
