= Be OK (Ingrid Michaelson song) =

Single by Ingrid Michaelson

from the album Be OK
- Released: August 19, 2008
- Recorded: 2008
- Genre: Indie pop
- Length: 2:27
- Label: Cabin 24 Records
- Songwriter(s): Ingrid Michaelson
- Producer(s): Stacy Jones & Bill Lefler

Ingrid Michaelson singles chronology
"The Way I Am" (2007)	"Be OK" (2008)	"Winter Song" (2008)

"Be OK" is the first single from Ingrid Michaelson's third studio album, Be OK.

The song was used in the films The House Bunny and The Decoy Bride, in Season 1, episode 7 of 90210, in Season 2, episode 15 of Parenthood, in Season 4, episode 1 of Ugly Betty, and in advertisements for Better With You. It is mentioned in the 2012 Law & Order: SVU episode "Child's Welfare" (Season 13, episode 16), although the character erroneously refers to it as "I Just Want To Be OK".

It was also used in commercials for Mott's Apple Juice, Ritz Crackers, Travelers Insurance and German insurance company Allianz.

In 2017, Michaelson performed another version of song on the TBS news satire show Full Frontal with Samantha Bee, titled "(Earth Is) Not OK" with similarly altered lyrics describing effects of climate change and hurricanes sung from the perspective of the earth.

== Music video ==
Two versions of the music video debuted through the Stand Up to Cancer Foundation. One version debuted through BORDERS, while the other debuted on the Stand Up to Cancer website and featured the acoustic version.

== Charts ==
Chart (2008–10)	Peak position
Austria (Ö3 Austria Top 40)	45
Germany (GfK)	64
UK Singles (Official Charts Company)	174
UK Indie (OCC)	18
US Billboard Hot 100	91
US Adult Alternative Songs (Billboard)	17
