= Be OK (album) =

Compilation album by Ingrid Michaelson
- Released: October 14, 2008
- Recorded: 2007–2008
- Genre: Indie pop
- Length: 34:42
- Label: Cabin 24

Ingrid Michaelson chronology
Girls and Boys (2006)	Be OK (2008)	Everybody (2009)

Singles from Be OK
- 1. "Keep Breathing" Released: May 15, 2007; 2. "Be OK" Released: August 19, 2008

Professional ratings
Review scores
Source	Rating
AllMusic	3/5 stars
Billboard	Positive
Entertainment Weekly	B−
Metacritic	60/100
Rolling Stone	2/5 stars
Orlando Sentinel	3/5 stars
The Washington Post	Positive

Be OK is a compilation album by American singer-songwriter Ingrid Michaelson. It was released on October 14, 2008. It entered the Billboard 200 chart at 35, with 15,000 copies sold in its first week.

The album consists of previously unreleased music, live recordings and cover versions.

According to Michaelson's website, a portion of the proceeds from the album's sales was to be donated to Stand Up to Cancer.

== Track listing ==
1. "Be OK" – 2:27
2. "Giving Up" – 4:09
3. "Over the Rainbow" – 2:56
4. "The Chain (Live from Webster Hall)" – 3:13
5. "Lady in Spain" – 3:11
6. "Keep Breathing" – 3:25
7. "Oh What a Day" – 2:28
8. "The Way I Am (Live on WERS)" – 2:03
9. "Can't Help Falling in Love (Live At Daytrotter)" – 3:14
10. "You and I" – 2:28
11. "Be OK (Acoustic)" – 2:32
