= Ingrid Michaelson =

American singer-songwriter (born 1979)

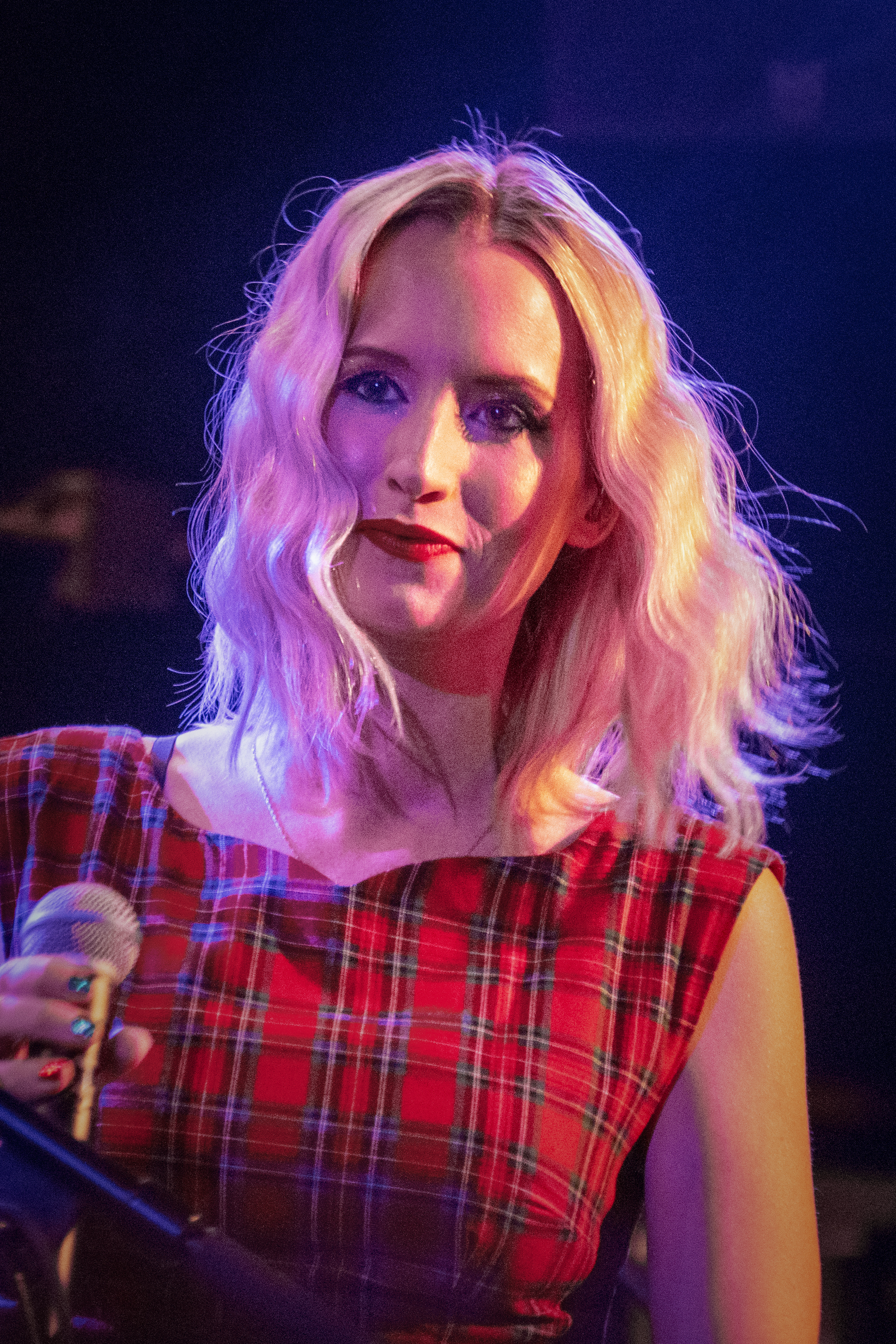
- Michaelson in 2019

Background information
- Born: Ingrid Ellen Michaelson; December 8, 1979 (age 46); New York City, U.S.
- Genres: Folk-pop; indie pop; indie folk; jazz; traditional pop
- Occupations: Singer; songwriter; composer
- Instruments: Vocals; guitar; piano; ukulele
- Years active: 2004–present
- Label: Cabin 24 Records
- Spouse: Greg Laswell (m. 2011; div. 2015)
- Partner: Will Chase (2015–present)
- Website: ingridmichaelson.com

Ingrid Ellen Michaelson (born December 8, 1979) is an American singer-songwriter. She is best known for her 2006 single "The Way I Am" and her 2014 single "Girls Chase Boys", both of which achieved success on Billboard's Adult Contemporary and Adult Top 40 charts, and received platinum certifications by the Recording Industry Association of America (RIAA). She has released eight independent albums.

== Early life ==
Ingrid Ellen Michaelson was born on December 8, 1979, in Stapleton, Staten Island. Her father, Carl Michaelson, was a manager of copyrights for the publishing company Carl Fischer Music and a composer on the side. Her mother, Elizabeth Egbert was a sculptor of Dutch ancestry.

As a child, Michaelson performed in a musical theatre group called Staten Island Kids On Stage. She took up piano at age four, and trained until age seven at Manhattan's Third Street Music School. She continued piano at the Jewish Community Center of Staten Island's Dorothy Delson Kuhn Music Institute. While there, she met vocal coach Elizabeth McCullough, who worked with her through high school.

Michaelson is a graduate of Staten Island Technical High School and Binghamton University, where she received a degree in theater. While at Binghamton University, she was a member of the Binghamtonics, a co-ed a cappella group; the Pappy Parker Players, an improv comedy group; and the theatre repertory company under Sue Peters.

== Career ==
=== 2004–08: Slow the Rain and Girls and Boys ===
While living on Staten Island and mainly busking in Lower Manhattan, Michaelson self-released her debut album Slow the Rain on January 10, 2005.

In 2006, Michaelson independently released her second album, Girls and Boys. The album, like her previous music, was streamed on Myspace. A music producer from the ABC drama Grey's Anatomy found her music online. After being contacted by the music producer, Michaelson began to be approached by several record companies. Wanting to retain all of the rights she had as an independent artist, Michaelson developed a deal with Original Signal Recordings, acting as the marketing and distribution arm for Michaelson's label. Through Original Signal, Michaelson re-released Girls and Boys into mainstream marketing on September 18, 2007. It peaked at No. 63 on the Billboard charts and received positive reviews from critics. "The Way I Am", a song from the album, was featured in an Old Navy commercial. In less than 3 weeks, more than 65 appearances in prime-time had been made, including 17 season premieres. In 2007, Ingrid played her first Holiday Hop, an annual Christmas concert in New York City.

In 2006, Michaelson teamed up with William Fitzsimmons on his album Goodnight, which was released that same year.

=== 2008–10: Be OK, Everybody, and Human Again ===
In October 2008, Michaelson released her third album, and first compilation album, Be OK, a charity record to support cancer research. In December 2008, Michaelson and Sara Bareilles released "Winter Song." The song was featured on The Hotel Café Presents Winter Songs, a compilation of holiday tracks sung by a lineup of female singer-songwriters. Michaelson and Bareilles performed "Winter Song" for Barack Obama and his family at the National Christmas Tree Lighting in December 2010.

In 2009, Michaelson released her fourth album, Everybody. Everybody debuted on No. 18 on the Billboard charts. It features the single "Maybe".

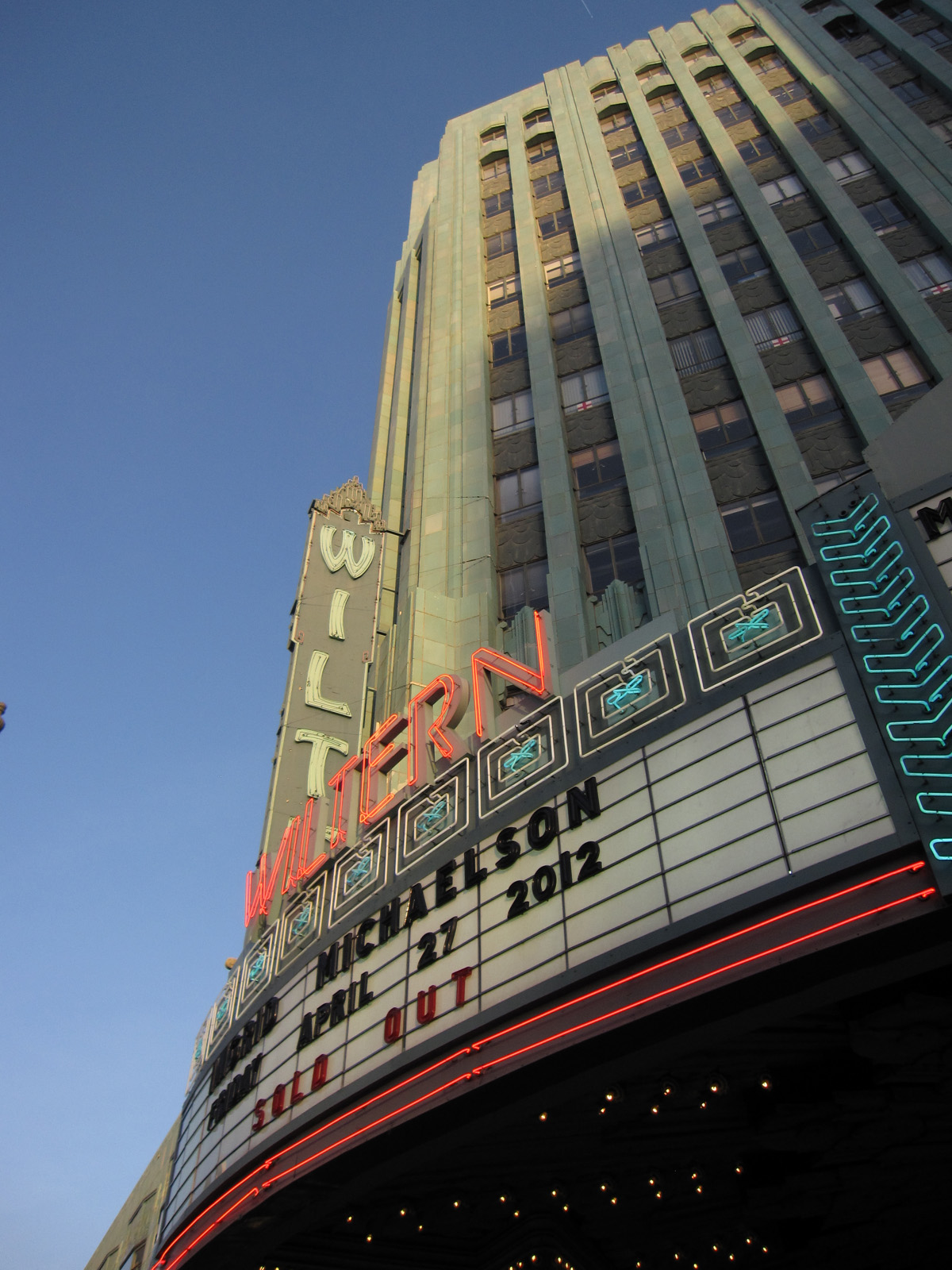
Signage announcing Michaelson at the Wiltern 2012

In 2010, Michaelson co-wrote the song "Parachute" with Marshall Altman for British singer Cheryl Cole. It was featured on Cole's debut solo album 3 Words, peaking at No. 5 on the UK Singles Chart. Michaelson initially believed the track was "so poppy" that she could not release it herself. However, after the song was reworked by "Everybody" producer Dan Romer to make a more "interesting, funky production", Michaelson released the song as a personal single.

On January 24, 2012, Michaelson released her fifth album, Human Again. Human Again debuted at No. 5 on the Billboard chart and received positive reviews, with critics praising the album's unique sound. To promote the album, Michaelson embarked on The Human Again Tour, with three North American legs, and one international leg.

In 2012, with her husband and fellow musician Greg Laswell, Michaelson co-wrote and sang the duet "Landline", which appeared on his album of the same name.

In September 2012, she was featured in a campaign called "30 Songs / 30 Days" to support Half the Sky: Turning Oppression into Opportunity for Women Worldwide, a multi-platform media project inspired by Nicholas Kristof and Sheryl WuDunn's book.

=== 2014–2017: Lights Out, It Doesn't Have To Make Sense, Alter Egos, and The Great Comet ===
On February 4, 2014, Michaelson released the lead single, "Girls Chase Boys", from her album Lights Out. The song reached No. 52 on the Billboard Hot 100. "Afterlife" and "Time Machine" were released as the second and third singles.

On April 25, 2014, Lights Out was released. The deluxe edition, which was released in November later that year, contains an additional six bonus tracks.

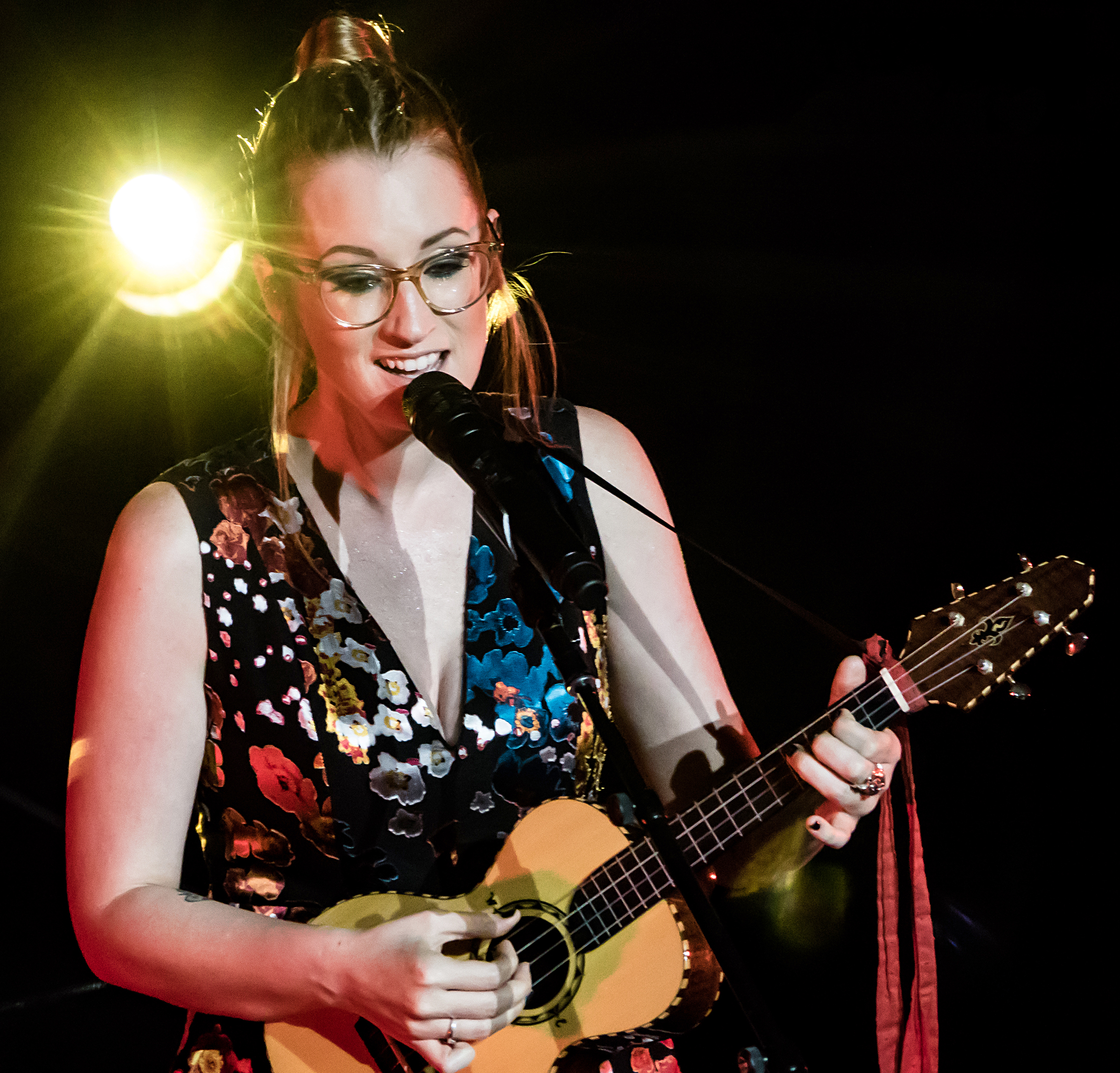
Michaelson on the "Hell No Tour", 2016

On April 29, 2016, Michaelson released the song "Hell No". It served as the lead single from her seventh studio album, It Doesn't Have to Make Sense, which was released on August 26, 2016. In July, she released a second video of "Hell No", which incorporates members of the Deaf West theater company performing the lyrics in American Sign Language. In support of the album, Michaelson embarked on the Hell No Tour beginning in Cincinnati on October 6, 2016.

In 2016, Michaelson and AJR co-wrote their single "The Lotto". AJR would go on to support Michaelson on the Hell No Tour.

On May 12, 2017, Michaelson released the five-track EP Alter Egos. It consists of re-worked songs from It Doesn't Have to Make Sense with guest vocalists on each track. The EP featured collaborations with Sara Bareilles, Tegan and Sara, AJR, Lucius, and The Civil Wars' John Paul White.

In 2017, Michaelson contributed "Smallest Light" and "Stay Right Where You Are" to the soundtrack for the film The Space Between Us.

Michaelson made her Broadway debut playing the role of Sonya Rostova in the musical Natasha, Pierre & The Great Comet of 1812 from July 3 to August 13, 2017.

=== 2018–2021: Songs for the Season and Stranger Songs ===
Michaelson made her film debut in the comedy film Humor Me alongside co-stars Jemaine Clement and Elliott Gould, which was released January 12, 2018. On October 26, 2018, Michaelson released a Christmas album called Ingrid Michaelson's Songs for the Season. On the album, Michaelson collaborated with Christina Perri, Grace VanderWaal, Leslie Odom Jr., and Will Chase. The deluxe version of the album was released in 2021 and features collaborations with Jason Mraz and Zooey Deschanel. Ingrid and Jason Mraz originally released "Christmas Valentine" as an Amazon Original single on November 14, 2019, before the song was added to the deluxe version of Songs for the Season in 2021.

On May 10, 2019, she released "Missing You", which served as the lead single off of her ninth studio album, Stranger Songs. Michaelson first announced the album in January 2018, writing that it would be inspired by the Netflix series Stranger Things. The album was released on June 28, 2019.

In 2020, Ingrid featured on an acoustic version of Ben Rector's song "It Would Be You." In 2021, Ingrid Michaelson collaborated with British-Pakistani singer Zayn Malik on the single "To Begin Again," which released on March 17.

Michaelson has scored songs for television, circa 2020, including Little Fires Everywhere (Emmy nominated) and Tiny Beautiful Things (both for Hulu), and was executive music producer for Apple TV+’s Slumberkins, creating original songs for the series. Michaelson was seen as a guest star in Season 3 of Netflix’s Girls5Eva, and starred in the 2017 indie film Humor Me alongside co-stars Jemaine Clement and Elliott Gould.

In July 2020, Michaelson was nominated for her first Emmy Award in the Outstanding Original Music and Lyrics category for the song "Build it Up", written specifically for the finale of Hulu's miniseries Little Fires Everywhere. Michaelson partnered with collaborators Juan Ariza and Gabriel Mann to compose an original song "Not Gone," a cover of "Closer to Fine" and the score for the Hulu miniseries Tiny Beautiful Things. Michaelson served as executive music producer for Apple TV+’s Slumberkins, creating original songs for the series with her bandmates Allie Moss, Hannah Winkler, and Billy Libby.

=== 2022–present: The Notebook and For the Dreamers ===
In January 2019, Michaelson announced she was writing the music and lyrics for the musical adaptation of The Notebook. After its world premiere at the Chicago Shakespeare Theatre in 2022, the musical premiered on Broadway at the Gerald Schoenfeld Theatre on March 14, 2024. "Carry You Home" won a Broadway.com Audience Choice Award for Favorite New Song. The musical received three nominations at the 77th Tony Awards. The original Broadway cast recording, released via Atlantic, reached No. 1 on Billboard's Cast Albums Chart and was nominated for the Grammy Award for Best Musical Theater Album.

In 2022, Michaelson featured on Ariza's song "The Sky and Me". Later that year, Michaelson collaborated with A Great Big World on an original song called "It's Almost Christmas", released on November 11, 2022. In 2024, Michaelson made a guest appearance in season 3 of Netflix's Girls5eva, playing the role of Pixie, a folk singer-songwriter.

Michaelson released a string of singles from her album For the Dreamers, including "Love Is" with Jason Mraz on February 2, a cover of the song "What a Wonderful World" on May 23, and "It Never Ends" on May 30. The album was released August 23, 2024. On the May 16, 2026 season finale of Saturday Night Live, Michaelson performed backing vocals for Paul McCartney during his three song performance. Two more songs were performed but were unaired.

== Band members ==
Past and present band members include Allie Moss (guitar and background vocals), Hannah Winkler (keys and background vocals), Chris Kuffner (bass), Bess Rogers (guitar), Saul Simon MacWilliams (keys), Billy Libby (guitar and background vocals), Sarab Singh (drums), and Elliot Jacobson (drums).

== Personal life ==
Michaelson married fellow musician Greg Laswell in 2011. They divorced in 2015. In late 2015, Michaelson announced her relationship with film and stage actor Will Chase. As of 2018, she was living in Prospect Heights, Brooklyn and had a house in Upstate New York. She previously had properties in Hollywood Hills, Los Angeles and Nyack, New York.

Michaelson identifies as a feminist.

== Discography ==
- Slow the Rain (2005)
- Girls and Boys (2006)
- Be OK (2008)
- Everybody (2009)
- Human Again (2012)
- Lights Out (2014)
- It Doesn't Have to Make Sense (2016)
- Songs for the Season (2018)
- Stranger Songs (2019)
- For the Dreamers (2024)
