= Wasted on You (Morgan Wallen song) =

Single by Morgan Wallen

from the album Dangerous: The Double Album
- Released: March 7, 2022
- Genre: Country pop; trap
- Length: 2:58
- Label: Big Loud; Republic
- Songwriters: Morgan Wallen; Ernest Keith Smith; Josh Thompson; Ryan Vojtesak
- Producers: Joey Moi; Jacob Durrett

Morgan Wallen singles chronology
"Flower Shops" (2021)	"Wasted on You" (2022)	"You Proof" (2022)

Lyric video
- "Wasted on You" on YouTube

"Wasted on You" is a song by American country music singer Morgan Wallen, released to country radio on March 7, 2022, as the fourth single and final single from his 2021 album Dangerous: The Double Album. Wallen wrote the song with Ryan Vojtesak, Ernest Keith Smith, and Josh Thompson. Before its release as a single, "Wasted on You" topped the Billboard Hot Country Songs chart at the time of the album's release in January 2021.

== History and content ==
Wallen debuted "Wasted on You" on January 11, 2021, as part of an acoustic set released on YouTube in advance of the album's release. In this acoustic set, he performed the song with his touring band: drummer Mark Annino, bassist Luke Rice, and guitarists Tyler Tomlinson and Dominic Frost. Wallen wrote the song with Ernest K. Smith, Josh Thompson, and Ryan Vojtseak.

== Critical reception ==
Owen Myers of Pitchfork stated that the song is "a blend of trap snares and guitar twang that isn't quite as fluid as the country/hip-hop hybrids of, say, [Sam] Hunt". Pip Ellwood-Hughes thought that the song had a "modern" sound, contrasting it with Wallen's collaboration with Diplo on "Heartless".

== Chart performance ==
"Wasted on You" debuted at number one on the Billboard Hot Country Songs chart dated the week ending January 23, 2021, alongside the album tracks "Somebody's Problem", "Warning", and "Sand in My Boots" and the singles "7 Summers" and "More Than My Hometown". In doing so, Wallen became the first artist ever to chart six songs within the top ten of Hot Country Songs at the same time. The song's debut at the top of the chart coincided with Dangerous: The Double Album debuting at the number-one position on the Top Country Albums chart, making Wallen the first ever artist to debut at the top of both charts simultaneously. Furthermore, it was Wallen's second debut at the top, making him the first artist to have multiple songs debut at number one on the country chart. "Wasted on You" also debuted at number nine on the Billboard Hot 100. On December 16, 2025, it was certified 12× Platinum by RIAA.

== Charts ==
=== Weekly charts ===
Chart (2021–2023)	Peak position
Australia (ARIA)	78
Canada Hot 100 (Billboard)	10
Canada Country (Billboard)	1
Canada Hot AC (Billboard)	43
Global 200 (Billboard)	19
New Zealand Hot Singles (RMNZ)	26
US Billboard Hot 100	9
US Adult Contemporary (Billboard)	25
US Adult Pop Airplay (Billboard)	14
US Country Airplay (Billboard)	1
US Hot Country Songs (Billboard)	1
US Pop Airplay (Billboard)	16

=== Year-end charts ===
2021 year-end chart performance for "Wasted on You"
Chart (2021)	Position
US Hot Country Songs (Billboard)	21

2022 year-end chart performance for "Wasted on You"
Chart (2022)	Position
Global 200 (Billboard)	162
US Billboard Hot 100	19
US Country Airplay (Billboard)	8
US Hot Country Songs (Billboard)	1

2023 year-end chart performance for "Wasted on You"
Chart (2023)	Position
Australia (ARIA)	97
Global 200 (Billboard)	124
US Digital Song Sales (Billboard)	57
US Hot Country Songs (Billboard)	34
US Streaming Songs (Billboard)	14

== Certifications ==
Region	Certification	Certified units/sales
Australia (ARIA)	3× Platinum	210,000^{‡}
Canada (Music Canada)	6× Platinum	480,000^{‡}
New Zealand (RMNZ)	Platinum	30,000^{‡}
United Kingdom (BPI)	Silver	200,000^{‡}
United States (RIAA)	12× Platinum	12,000,000^{‡}
^{‡} Sales+streaming figures based on certification alone.

== Release history ==
Release history for "Wasted on You"
Region	Date	Format	Label	Ref.
Various	January 11, 2021	Digital download; streaming	Big Loud	
United States	March 7, 2022	Country radio	Big Loud	
United States	July 11, 2022	Adult contemporary radio	Big Loud	
United States	July 12, 2022	Contemporary hit radio	Big Loud	
