= 2021 in country music =

This is a list of notable events in country music that took place in 2021.

== Events ==
- January 1 – Tom T. Hall celebrates his 50th Grand Ole Opry Anniversary
- January 4 – Florida Georgia Line duo members Tyler Hubbard and Brian Kelley announce plans to release solo music, but will not be separating.
- January 20 – Following the release of his album Dangerous: The Double Album, Morgan Wallen becomes the first artist to have six songs in the top ten of the Hot Country Songs charts at the same time. He also becomes the first artist to debut at the top of the Hot Country Songs and Top Country Albums charts simultaneously, as well as the first artist to have more than one song debut at the top of the Hot Country Songs chart.
- January 27 – At the age of 84, legendary singer-songwriter and actor Kris Kristofferson officially announces his retirement from performing after more than five active decades in the entertainment industry.
- February 3 –
  - Morgan Wallen, whose album Dangerous was number one on the Billboard 200 at the time, has his recording contract with Big Loud Records indefinitely suspended after a video emerges of him using a racial slur. Wallen was also removed from numerous playlists and dropped from more than 400 radio stations. The Academy of Country Music Awards subsequently announced that he would be removed from eligibility for their forthcoming 2021 ceremony.
  - T.J Osborne, frontman and half of successful duo Brothers Osborne, comes out as gay, making him the first openly gay male artist signed to a major country label.
- February 23 – Taylor Swift's "Love Story (Taylor's Version)", a re-recorded version of her 2008 hit "Love Story", debuts at #1 on the Hot Country Songs chart, becoming the first artist to hit #1 twice on that chart with a single song, since Dolly Parton's "I Will Always Love You", in 1974 and 1982.
- March 5 – Lonestar lead singer Richie McDonald announces that he will be leaving the band to pursue a career with The Frontmen, a trio also consisting of Tim Rushlow and Larry Stewart, the former lead singers of Little Texas and Restless Heart, respectively, and will be replaced with former Sons of the Desert lead singer Drew Womack. McDonald previously departed Lonestar in 2007 to pursue a solo career, but then returned in 2011.
- March 22 – Morgan Wallen's Dangerous: The Double Album becomes the first album to spend its first ten weeks at number one on the Billboard 200 since 1987.
- April 1 – Confederate Railroad lead singer Danny Shirley breaks his back in an undisclosed accident.
- April 18 – Music writer Holly G. founds the Black Opry, a website and touring revue dedicated to black artists in country music.
- June 9 – Jon Randall quest Miranda Lambert and Jack Ingram at the 2021 CMT Music Awards.
- June 11 – High Valley mandolin player Curtis Rempel announces he is leaving the group and moving back to his hometown in Alberta to pursue a business with his wife, leaving older brother and frontman Brad Rempel as the last remaining of three brothers who formed the group.
- July 3 – Blake Shelton and Gwen Stefani are married at their Tishomingo ranch in Oklahoma, 6 months after their engagement.
- July 13 – Ashley Monroe announces that she has been diagnosed with a rare form of blood cancer.
- July 16 – Bill Anderson celebrates his 60th Grand Ole Opry Anniversary
  - Tanya Tucker announces she underwent emergency hip replacement surgery and was forced to cancel all tour dates.
- September 28 – Alan Jackson announces he has been diagnosed with Charcot–Marie–Tooth disease for a decade, affecting his ability to perform on tour.
- October 8 – Rascal Flatts lead singer Gary LeVox announces that the band is disbanding following the cancellation of their farewell tour and band member Joe Don Rooney's departure and DUI arrest one month prior.
- October 18 – Luke Bryan is announced as host for the 2021 CMA Awards, marking the first solo host in 18 years, since Vince Gill hosted the 2003 ceremony.

=== Grand Ole Opry ===
- January 21 – The members of Lady A are invited by Darius Rucker to be inducted into the Grand Ole Opry, effective immediately.
- February 6 – A year after her invitation on February 29, 2020, Rhonda Vincent is officially inducted by Dierks Bentley as an Opry member after her initial induction date was delayed by the COVID-19 pandemic.
- June 22 – Carly Pearce was invited by Dolly Parton to be a member of the Grand Ole Opry and she was officially inducted on August 3, 2021 by Trisha Yearwood.
- August 10 – Southern gospel group The Isaacs are invited by Ricky Skaggs to become Opry members and were inducted by him and The Whites on September 14.
- September 28 – Nashville vocalist Mandy Barnett was invited by Connie Smith to be a member of the Opry on her birthday and after making more than 500 appearances over thirty years and was officially inducted by her and her husband Marty Stuart on November 2.
- December 4 – The Kentucky Headhunters play the Grand Ole Opry for the first time. The band had previously been rejected from this position in 1990.
- December 18 – Lauren Alaina is invited by Trisha Yearwood to become an Opry member. The induction is set for early 2022.

== Top hits of the year ==
The following songs placed within the Top 20 on the Hot Country Songs, Country Airplay, or Canada Country charts in 2021:

=== Singles released by American and Australian artists ===
Songs	Airplay	Canada	Single	Artist	References
1	15	12	"7 Summers"	Morgan Wallen	
13	—	—	"865"	Morgan Wallen	
25	25	4	"All Night"	Brothers Osborne	
1	—	—	"All Too Well (Taylor's Version)"	Taylor Swift	
7	5	6	"Almost Maybes"	Jordan Davis	
1	52	—	"Am I the Only One"	Aaron Lewis	
7	1	2	"Beers and Sunshine"	Darius Rucker	
1	1	1	"Better Together"	Luke Combs	
5	1	1	"Blame It on You"	Jason Aldean	
4	1	3	"Breaking Up Was Easy in the 90s"	Sam Hunt	
7	1	1	"Champagne Night"	Lady A	
3	2	4	"Chasing After You"	Ryan Hurd with Maren Morris	
5	1	1	"Cold as You"	Luke Combs	
3	1	6	"Cold Beer Calling My Name"	Jameson Rodgers featuring Luke Combs	
5	1	1	"Country Again"	Thomas Rhett	
15	—	—	"Cover Me Up"	Morgan Wallen	
17	—	—	"Dangerous"	Morgan Wallen	
5	1	1	"Down to One"	Luke Bryan	
3	1	1	"Drinkin' Beer. Talkin' God. Amen."	Chase Rice featuring Florida Georgia Line	
2	1	1	"Famous Friends"	Chris Young and Kane Brown	
1	1	3	"Fancy Like"	Walker Hayes	
1	1	1	"Forever After All"	Luke Combs	
2	1	8	"Glad You Exist"	Dan + Shay	
2	2	2	"Gone"	Dierks Bentley	
1	1	3	"The Good Ones"	Gabby Barrett	
1	1	10	"Good Time"	Niko Moon	
10	2	10	"Happy Does"	Kenny Chesney	
2	1	1	"Hell of a View"	Eric Church	
6	2	1	"Hole in the Bottle"	Kelsea Ballerini	
18	4	33	"How They Remember You"	Rascal Flatts	
4	2	26	"I Should Probably Go to Bed"	Dan + Shay	
8	9	1	"I Was on a Boat That Day"	Old Dominion	
2	1	1	"If I Didn't Love You"	Jason Aldean & Carrie Underwood	
30	20	43	"It's 'Cause I Am"	Callista Clark	
17	14	39	"Just About Over You"	Priscilla Block	
3	1	1	"Just the Way"	Parmalee & Blanco Brown	
10	2	7	"Knowing You"	Kenny Chesney	
7	1	9	”Lady”	Brett Young	
20	13	4	"Like a Lady"	Lady A	
3	42	—	"Lil Bit"	Nelly & Florida Georgia Line	
4	1	1	"Long Live"	Florida Georgia Line	
1	57	—	"Love Story (Taylor's Version)"	Taylor Swift	
3	1	1	"Made for You"	Jake Owen	
9	—	—	"Memory"	Kane Brown & Blackbear	
5	1	1	"Memory I Don't Mess With"	Lee Brice	
12	9	9	"Minimum Wage"	Blake Shelton	
2	—	—	"Mr. Perfectly Fine"	Taylor Swift	
8	5	35	"Momma's House"	Dustin Lynch	
19	—	—	"More Surprised Than Me"	Morgan Wallen	
4	1	29	"My Boy"	Elvie Shane	
18	—	—	"Neon Eyes"	Morgan Wallen	
23	15	2	"Next Girl"	Carly Pearce	
2	54	—	"No Body, No Crime"	Taylor Swift featuring Haim	
5	2	23	"Nobody"	Dylan Scott	
10	10	1	"One Too Many"	Keith Urban featuring P!nk	
8	1	3	"Same Boat"	Zac Brown Band	
6	6	1	"Settling Down"	Miranda Lambert	
4	1	2	"Single Saturday Night"	Cole Swindell	
1	2	3	"Starting Over"	Chris Stapleton	
2	37	45	"Take Me Home for Christmas"	Dan + Shay	
3	1	4	"Things a Man Oughta Know"	Lainey Wilson	
2	1	2	"Thinking 'Bout You"	Dustin Lynch featuring Lauren Alaina or MacKenzie Porter	
23	16	4	"Undivided"	Tim McGraw & Tyler Hubbard	
10	—	—	"Warning"	Morgan Wallen	
2	1	1	"Waves"	Luke Bryan	
7	1	1	"We Didn't Have Much"	Justin Moore	
1	1	1	"What's Your Country Song"	Thomas Rhett	
6	—	—	"You All Over Me"	Taylor Swift featuring Maren Morris	
7	1	23	"You Time"	Scotty McCreery	

=== Singles released by Canadian artists ===
Songs	Airplay	Canada	Single	Artist	References
—	—	1	"All Night to Figure It Out"	Jade Eagleson	
—	—	12	"Been a Minute"	Hunter Brothers	
—	—	1	"Boy Like Me"	Aaron Goodvin	
—	—	1	"Boys"	Dean Brody featuring Mickey Guyton	
—	—	20	"Diamonds in a Whiskey Glass"	Gord Bamford	
—	—	5	"Drinkin' Songs"	MacKenzie Porter	
—	—	15	"Every Time You Take Your Time"	Aaron Goodvin	
—	59	8	"F-150"	Robyn Ottolini	
—	—	1	"A Few Good Stories"	Brett Kissel	
—	—	8	"Fighting"	Tyler Joe Miller	
—	—	5	"Girl Who Didn't Care"	Tenille Townes	
—	—	6	"Give It to Me Straight"	Tenille Arts	
—	—	10	"Good on You"	Lindsay Ell	
—	—	5	"In a Bar"	Matt Lang	
—	—	17	"It Didn't"	Madeline Merlo	
—	—	7	"Lightning Bug"	Dean Brody	
—	—	9	"Lightning in a Bottle"	Nate Haller	
—	—	1	"Make a Life, Not a Living"	Brett Kissel	
—	—	15	"Mapdot"	Jess Moskaluke	
—	—	9	"Me Without You"	Tim & the Glory Boys	
—	—	1	"More Drinkin' Than Fishin'"	Jade Eagleson and Dean Brody	
—	—	17	"Never Run Outta Road"	The Washboard Union	
—	—	13	"Neverland"	Andrew Hyatt	
—	—	13	"Never Giving Up on You"	Meghan Patrick	
—	—	5	"Not Gonna Not"	Reklaws	
—	—	13	"Nothin' I Don't Love About You"	Jess Moskaluke	
—	—	11	"Only a Woman"	Matt Lang	
—	—	1	"Over All Over Again"	James Barker Band	
—	—	1	"River's Still Running"	High Valley	
—	—	12	"Shotgun Rider"	Tebey	
—	—	1	"Some Things Never Change"	Dallas Smith featuring Hardy	
7	3	9	"Somebody Like That"	Tenille Arts	
—	—	5	"Sometimes I Do"	Tyler Joe Miller	
—	—	10	"Without a Prayer"	Tim & the Glory Boys	

== Top new album releases ==
US	Album	Artist	Record label	Release date	Reference
3	The Ballad of Dood and Juanita	Sturgill Simpson	High Top Mountain	August 20	
3	Body Language	Blake Shelton	Warner Nashville	May 21	
3	The Comeback	Zac Brown Band	Southern Ground	October 15	
2	Country Again: Side A	Thomas Rhett	Valory	April 30	
4	Country Stuff (EP)	Walker Hayes	Monument	June 18	
1	Dangerous: The Double Album	Morgan Wallen	Big Loud	January 8	
3	Famous Friends	Chris Young	RCA Nashville	August 6	
1	Fearless (Taylor's Version)	Taylor Swift	Republic Records	April 9	
1	Red (Taylor's Version)	Taylor Swift	Republic Records	November 12	
6	Gold Chain Cowboy	Parker McCollum	MCA Nashville	July 30	
2	Good Things	Dan + Shay	Warner Nashville	August 13	
3	Greenfields	Barry Gibb	Capitol	January 8	
3	Heart	Eric Church	EMI Nashville	April 16	
7	Heartland	Nelly	Columbia Nashville	August 27	
3	Human: The Double Album	Cody Johnson	Warner Nashville	October 8	
3	Life Rolls On	Florida Georgia Line	BMLG	February 12	
3	Macon	Jason Aldean	Broken Bow/Macon	November 12	
7	The Marfa Tapes	Miranda Lambert, Jack Ingram and Jon Randall	RCA Nashville	May 7	
1	My Savior	Carrie Underwood	Capitol Nashville	March 26	
3	Raise the Roof	Robert Plant and Alison Krauss	Rounder Records	November 19	
9	Renewal	Billy Strings	Rounder Records	September 23	
8	Ruthless	Gary Allan	MCA Nashville	June 25	
9	Still Woman Enough	Loretta Lynn	Legacy	March 19	
2	Soul	Eric Church	EMI Nashville	April 23	
1	Star-Crossed	Kacey Musgraves	Interscope/MCA Nashville	September 10	
10	Same Truck	Scotty McCreery	Triple Tigers	September 17	
4	Time, Tequila & Therapy	Old Dominion	RCA Nashville	October 8	
9	Weekends Look a Little Different These Days	Brett Young	BMLG	June 4	
2	Where Have You Gone	Alan Jackson	EMI Nashville/ACR	May 14	
5	You Hear Georgia	Blackberry Smoke	3 Legged/Thirty Tigers	May 28	
9	29 (EP)	Carly Pearce	Big Machine	February 19	
9	29: Written in Stone	Carly Pearce	Big Machine	September 17	

=== Other top albums ===
US	Album	Artist	Record label	Release date	Reference
34	The Album	Chase Rice	Broken Bow/Dack Janiels	May 28	
23	Bet You're from a Small Town	Jameson Rodgers	Columbia Nashville	September 17	
11	Buy Dirt (EP)	Jordan Davis	MCA Nashville	May 21	
35	For You	Parmalee	Stoney Creek	July 30	
12	Good Time	Niko Moon	RCA Nashville	August 27	
28	Hell of a Holiday	Pistol Annies	RCA Nashville	October 22	
29	The Horses and the Hounds	James McMurtry	New West	August 20	
41	In It for the Money (EP)	Jameson Rodgers	Columbia Nashville	August 6	
40	Land of the Free	Home Free	Home Free	June 25	
12	Mercy	Cody Jinks	Late August	November 12	
23	Midtown Diaries (EP)	Mitchell Tenpenny	Columbia Nashville	September 10	
11	Pelago	Ryan Hurd	RCA Nashville	October 15	
25	Peso in My Pocket	Toby Keith	Show Dog-Universal	October 15	
47	Remember Her Name	Mickey Guyton	Capitol Nashville	September 24	
12	Revived Remixed Revisited	Reba McEntire	MCA Nashville	October 8	
29	Same Ol Same Ol	Upchurch	Redneck Nation	June 25	
40	Sayin' What I'm Thinkin'	Lainey Wilson	Broken Bow	February 19	
49	Set in Stone	Travis Tritt	Big Noise Music Group	May 7	
21	Sitting Pretty on Top of the World	Lauren Alaina	19/Mercury Nashville	September 3	
38	Straight Outta the Country	Justin Moore	Valory	April 23	
41	The Way I Wanna Go	Trace Adkins	Verge Nashville	August 27	
12	What a Song Can Do	Lady A	Big Machine	October 22	
12	& (EP)	Eric Church	EMI Nashville	April 20	

== Deaths ==
- January 1 – Misty Morgan, 75, American country singer (Jack Blanchard & Misty Morgan), cancer.
- January 7 – Jamie O'Hara, 70, American country singer-songwriter ("Grandpa (Tell Me 'Bout the Good Old Days)") and member of The O'Kanes ("Can't Stop My Heart from Loving You"), cancer.
- January 8 – Ed Bruce, 81, American actor, country singer-songwriter ("Mammas Don't Let Your Babies Grow Up to Be Cowboys" and "You're the Best Break This Old Heart Ever Had"), natural causes.
- January 12 - Ron Getman, 72, member of The Tractors
- January 14 – Larry Willoughby, 73, American country singer-songwriter ("Building Bridges" and "Operator, Operator") and music executive, vice-president of A&R at Capitol Records, COVID-19.
- January 16 – Jason "Rowdy" Cope, 42, guitarist for The Steel Woods.
- January 18 – Jimmie Rodgers, 87, American pop singer ("Honeycomb" and "Kisses Sweeter Than Wine") who also charted several country singles.
- January 21 – Randy Parton, 67, American country singer-songwriter ("Hold Me Like You Never Had Me" and "Shot Full of Love"), younger brother of Dolly Parton, cancer.
- February 3 – Jim Weatherly, 77, songwriter ("Midnight Train to Georgia" and "Someone Else's Star"), natural causes
- February 9 – Richie Albright, 81, American drummer (Waymore's Outlaws).
- February 10 – Lee Sexton, 92, American banjo player.
- March 12 – Scott Whitehead, 61, member of Hometown News (natural causes)
- April 14 – Rusty Young, 75, singer-songwriter, guitarist, and co-founder of American country rock group Poco.
- April 23 – Charlie Black, 71, songwriter ("Come Next Monday", "A Little Good News", and "You Lie")
- May 2 – Tommy West, 78, American record producer and singer-songwriter, producer of works by Ed Bruce, Jim Croce, Holly Dunn, Anne Murray, and others.
- May 19 – Johnny Ashcroft, 94, Australian country singer.
- May 22 – Glenn Douglas Tubb, 85, American singer-songwriter ("Home of the Blues", "Skip a Rope", and "Two Story House").
- May 23 – Dewayne Blackwell, 84, American songwriter ("Friends in Low Places" and "I'm Gonna Hire a Wino to Decorate Our Home")
- May 29 – B.J. Thomas, 78, American singer who scored country, pop and Christian hits in the 1960s, 1970s and 1980s ("Hooked on a Feeling" and "Raindrops Keep Fallin' on My Head"), lung cancer
- July 4 – Sanford Clark, 85, American rockabilly singer (COVID-19).
- July 10 – Byron Berline, 77, American fiddler.
- August 2 - Clavis Eugene "Gene" Hughey, 80, American bass player (Conway Twitty's Twitty Bird Band) and brother of steel guitar player John Hughey
- August 4 – Razzy Bailey, 82, American country singer from 1970s and 1980s who charted five number one singles on the Hot Country Songs chart between 1980 and 1982 ("Friends", "Loving Up a Storm", and "Midnight Hauler").
- August 13 – Nanci Griffith, 68, American country folk singer-songwriter ("From a Distance", "Love at the Five and Dime", and "Outbound Plane")
- August 20 – Tom T. Hall, 85, American country singer-songwriter ("That's How I Got to Memphis", "Harper Valley PTA", "I Love", "Little Bitty"), suicide.
- August 21 – Don Everly, 84, one-half of The Everly Brothers.
- August 26 –
  - Kenny Malone, 83, American drummer, COVID-19.
  - Kim Tribble, 69, songwriter ("Guys Do It All the Time", "I Can Still Feel You"), dementia
- September 12 – Don Maddox, 98, American country singer (Maddox Brothers and Rose).
- September 22 – Bob Moore, 88, American Hall of Fame session bassist (The Nashville A-Team) and orchestra leader.
- September 23 – Sue Thompson, 96, American pop and country singer ("Sad Movies (Make Me Cry)", "Norman").
- September 26 – George Frayne IV, 77, American country singer and keyboardist (Commander Cody and His Lost Planet Airmen), cancer.
- October 14 – Phil Leadbetter, 59, American bluegrass musician, COVID-19.
- October 24 – Sonny Osborne, 83 American banjo player and one half of The Osborne Brothers.
- October 26 – Rose Lee Maphis, 98, American singer, pioneer of the Bakersfield sound with husband Joe Maphis.
- December 2 - Neil Flanz, 83, Canadian pedal steel guitar player, member Steel Guitar Hall of Fame.
- December 4 - Stonewall Jackson, 89, American country singer and Grand Ole Opry member ("Waterloo" and "B.J. the D.J.").
- December 10 - Michael Nesmith, 78, American rock (The Monkees) and country rock (First National Band) musician, heart failure.
- December 18 - Renée Martel, 74, French Canadian country singer, pneumonia.
- December 24 - J. D. Crowe, 84, American banjo player and bluegrass band leader (New South).

== Hall of Fame inductees ==
=== Country Music Hall of Fame ===
(presented on May 1, 2022)

- Eddie Bayers
- Ray Charles
- Pete Drake
- The Judds

=== Canadian Country Music Hall of Fame ===
- Patricia Conroy
- Randy Stark

=== Bluegrass Hall of Fame ===
- Alison Krauss
- Lynn Morris
- The Stoneman Family

=== Nashville Songwriters Hall of Fame ===
- Rhett Akins
- Buddy Cannon
- Amy Grant
- Toby Keith
- John Scott Sherrill

== Major awards ==
=== Academy of Country Music Awards ===
(presented on March 7, 2022)

- Entertainer of the Year – Miranda Lambert
- Male Artist of the Year – Chris Stapleton
- Female Artist of the Year – Carly Pearce
- Group of the Year – Old Dominion
- Duo of the Year – Brothers Osborne
- New Male Artist of the Year – Parker McCollum
- New Female Artist of the Year – Lainey Wilson
- Songwriter of the Year – Michael Hardy
- Single of the Year – "If I Didn't Love You" (Jason Aldean & Carrie Underwood)
- Song of the Year – "Things a Man Oughta Know" (Jason Nix, Jonathan Singleton, Lainey Wilson
- Album of the Year – Dangerous (Morgan Wallen)
- Musical Event of the Year – "Never Wanted to Be That Girl" (Carly Pearce & Ashley McBryde)
- Video of the Year – "Drunk (And I Don't Wanna Go Home)" (Elle King & Miranda Lambert)

=== American Music Awards ===
(presented on November 21, 2021)

- Favorite Country Album – Goldmine (Gabby Barrett)
- Favorite Country Song – "The Good Ones" (Gabby Barrett)
- Favorite Male Country Artist – Luke Bryan
- Favorite Female Country Artist – Carrie Underwood
- Favorite Country Duo/Group – Dan + Shay

=== Americana Music Honors & Awards ===
(presented on September 22, 2021)

- Artist of the Year – Brandi Carlile
- Duo/Group of the Year – Black Pumas
- Album of the Year – Cuttin' Grass, Vol. 1: The Butcher Shoppe Sessions (Sturgill Simpson)
- Song of the Year – "I Remember Everything" – (Pat McLaughlin, John Prine)
- Emerging Act of the Year – Charley Crockett
- Instrumentalist of the Year – Kristin Weber (guitar)
- Trailblazer Award – The Mavericks
- Free Speech/Inspiration Award – Carla Thomas
- Lifetime Achievement Award for Performance – Keb' Mo'
- Lifetime Achievement Award for Producer/Engineer – Trina Shoemaker
- Legacy of Americana Award – Fisk Jubilee Singers

=== ARIA Awards ===
(presented on November 24, 2021)

- Best Country Album - The World Today (Troy Cassar-Daley)

=== Billboard Music Awards ===
(presented on May 23, 2021)

- Top Country Artist - Morgan Wallen
- Top Male Country Artist - Morgan Wallen
- Top Female Country Artist - Gabby Barrett
- Top Country Duo/Group - Florida Georgia Line
- Top Country Album - Dangerous: The Double Album (Morgan Wallen)
- Top Country Song - "I Hope" (Gabby Barrett)

=== Canadian Country Music Association Awards ===
(presented on November 29, 2021)

- Entertainer of the Year - Dallas Smith
- Fan Choice - Brett Kissel
- Album of the Year - The Lemonade Stand (Tenille Townes)
- Alternative Country Album of the Year - Agricultural Tragic (Corb Lund)
- Male Artist of the Year - Dallas Smith
- Female Artist of the Year - Tenille Townes
- Group or Duo of the Year - The Reklaws
- Interactive Artist/Group of the Year - Lindsay Ell
- Rising Star - Robyn Ottolini
- Single of the Year - "Like a Man" (Dallas Smith)
- Songwriter of the Year - "Champagne Night" (Patricia Conroy, Ester Dean, Andrew DeRoberts, Dave Haywood, Charles Kelley, Shane McAnally, Madeline Merlo, Tina Parol, Hillary Scott, Ryan Tedder, Dave Thomson)
- Video of the Year - "Make a Life, Not a Living" (Brett Kissel)
- Top Selling Canadian Album of the Year - Timeless (Dallas Smith)
- Top Selling Canadian Single of the Year - Can't Help Myself" (Dean Brody & The Reklaws)
- Producer of the Year - Danick Dupelle
- Drummer of the Year - Matthew Atkins & Ben Bradley
- Fiddle Player of the Year - Tyler Vollrath
- Specialty Instrument Player of the Year - Mitch Jay

=== CMT Music Awards ===
(presented on June 9, 2021)

- Video of the Year - "Hallelujah" (Carrie Underwood featuring John Legend)
- Male Video of the Year - "Worship You" (Kane Brown)
- Female Video of the Year - "The Good Ones" (Gabby Barrett)
- Duo/Group Video of the Year - "Wine, Beer, Whiskey" (Little Big Town)
- Breakthrough Video of the Year - "Nobody" (Dylan Scott)
- Collaborative Video of the Year - "Famous Friends" (Chris Young, featuring Kane Brown)
- CMT Performance of the Year - "The Other Girl" (Kelsea Ballerini featuring Halsey)
- Family Feature - "The Best Day" (Taylor Swift)
- CMT Equal Play Award - Linda Martell

CMT Artists of the Year
(presented October 13, 2021 in Nashville)

- Kelsea Ballerini
- Luke Combs
- Gabby Barrett
- Mickey Guyton
- Chris Stapleton
- Artist of a Lifetime: Randy Travis

=== Country Music Association Awards ===
(presented on November 10, 2021)

- Entertainer of the Year – Luke Combs
- Male Vocalist of the Year – Chris Stapleton
- Female Vocalist of the Year – Carly Pearce
- Vocal Group of the Year – Old Dominion
- New Artist of the Year – Jimmie Allen
- Vocal Duo of the Year – Brothers Osborne
- Musician of the Year – Jenee Fleenor (fiddle)
- Single of the Year – "Starting Over" (Chris Stapleton)
- Song of the Year – "Starting Over" (Mike Henderson and Chris Stapleton)
- Album of the Year – Starting Over (Chris Stapleton)
- Musical Event of the Year – "Half of My Hometown" (Kelsea Ballerini featuring Kenny Chesney)
- Video of the Year – "Half of My Hometown" (Kelsea Ballerini featuring Kenny Chesney)

=== Grammy Awards ===
(presented on April 3, 2022)

- Best Country Solo Performance – "You Should Probably Leave" (Chris Stapleton)
- Best Country Duo/Group Performance – "Younger Me" (Brothers Osborne
- Best Country Song – "Cold" (Dave Cobb, J.T. Cure, Derek Mixon, Chris Stapleton)
- Best Country Album – Starting Over (Chris Stapleton)
- Best Bluegrass Album – My Bluegrass Heart (Béla Fleck)
- Best Americana Album – Native Sons (Los Lobos)
- Best American Roots Performance – "Cry" (Jon Batiste)
- Best American Roots Song – "Cry" (Jon Batiste, Steve McEwan)
- Best Roots Gospel Album – My Savior (Carrie Underwood)

=== International Bluegrass Music Awards ===
(presented on September 30, 2021)

- Entertainer of the Year – Billy Strings
- Male Vocalist of the Year – Del McCoury and Danny Paisley
- Female Vocalist of the Year – Dale Ann Bradley
- Vocal Group of the Year – Sister Sadie
- Instrumental Group of the Year – Appalachian Road Show
- New Artist of the Year – Appalachian Road Show
- Album of the Year – Industrial Strength Bluegrass: Southern Ohio's Musical Legacy (Joe Mullins)
- Song of the Year – "Richest Man" (Jim Beavers, Connie Harrington,Jimmy Yeary)
- Gospel Recording of the Year – "After While" (Dale Ann Bradley) and "In the Resurrection Morning" (Sacred Reunion featuring Doyle Lawson, Vince Gill, Barry Abernathy, Tim Stafford, Mark Wheeler, Jim VanCleve, Phil Leadbeter and Jason Moore)
- Instrumental Recording of the Year – "Ground Speed" (Kristin Scott Benson, Skip Cherryholmes, Jeremy Garrett, Kevin Kehrberg and Darren Nicholson)
- Collaborative Recording of the Year – "White Line Fever" (Bobby Osborne with Tim O'Brien, Trey Hensley, Sierra Hull, Stuart Duncan, Todd Phillips and Alison Brown)
- Guitar Player of the Year – Billy Strings
- Banjo Player of the Year – Scott Vestal
- Fiddle Player of the Year – Bronwyn Keith-Hynes
- Mandolin Player of the Year – Sierra Hull
- Bass Player of the Year – Missy Raines
- Resophonic Guitar Player of the Year – Justin Moses

=== Juno Awards ===
(presented on May 15, 2022)

- Country Album of the Year - What Is Life? (Brett Kissel)
