= 2020 in country music =

This is a list of notable events in country music that took place in 2020.

== Events ==
=== COVID-19 ===
- March 16 – The 55th Academy of Country Music Awards, originally scheduled for April 5, was postponed to September 16. A few weeks later, the 2020 CMT Music Awards were pushed back to October 21, from their original date of June 3.
- March 20 - The Grand Ole Opry announces it will continue hosting performances, but without a live audience attending in the Ryman Auditorium.
- March 29 – Joe Diffie, a country music superstar who scored many Top Ten hits during the 1990s and early 2000s, dies from complications of COVID-19, two days after announcing he had fallen ill.
- March 31 – The Country Music Association announces that the 2020 CMA Fest, scheduled for June 4–7, is officially canceled.
- October 7 – Morgan Wallen is dropped as a musical guest by Saturday Night Live after a video of him attending a party without wearing a face mask surfaces. Jack White eventually is called to be the replacement musical guest.
- December 12 – Charley Pride dies from complications of COVID-19 one month after receiving the Willie Nelson Lifetime Achievement Award at the CMA Awards, an event that would turn out to be his final public appearance.

=== Other ===
- January 2 – Capitol Records Nashville signs Hot Country Knights, a fictitious band portrayed by Dierks Bentley and members of his road band.
- January 4 – Radio personality Fitz takes over as permanent host of Bob Kingsley's Country Top 40, succeeding the longtime radio host who died in 2019. Affiliates of Fitz's previous programs – The Fitz Show, The Hit List with Fitz, and Nashville Minute with Fitz – were replaced with programs from KCCS Productions, which produces CT40.
- January 7 – Rascal Flatts announced that they would be disbanding following a farewell tour after 20 years together. The tour (in addition to several other tours) would later be cancelled due to COVID-19.
- February 24 - Several country songs, including Luke Bryan's "Country Girl (Shake It for Me)" and Trace Adkins' "Honky Tonk Badonkadonk", went under fire by female listeners after compromising the lyrics as sexist for sexually objectifying women and urging these songs to be pulled from radio airwaves.
- March 7 – Jimmie Allen's "Make Me Want To" tops the Billboard Country Airplay chart in its 58th week, setting a record for both the slowest ascent to the top and the longest overall run in that chart's history.
- March 23 – Maren Morris and Ryan Hurd announce the birth of their first child, Hayes Andrew Hurd.
- May 5 – Travis Denning's "After a Few" charts on Country Airplay for the 60th week, breaking the longevity record set on that chart only two months prior. It would later reach the top on June 13 in its 65th week, also setting a record for the longest climb to Number One since the inception of Nielsen Soundscan in 1990.
- May 14–15 – Vocalist Hannah Mulholland quits the group Runaway June and is replaced by Natalie Stovall, formerly of Natalie Stovall and the Drive.
- June – Amid the fallout from the George Floyd protests, two groups change their names. On June 11, Lady Antebellum announces their name will change to Lady A, the group's longstanding nickname. On June 25, the Dixie Chicks become known as The Chicks. Both moves were announced amid criticism that the words "Antebellum" and "Dixie" had connotations of American slavery.
- June 13 – Hank Williams Jr.'s 27-year-old daughter, Katharine Williams-Dunning, is killed in a car accident in Henry County, Tennessee.
- June 19 – Carly Pearce and Michael Ray announce their divorce after less than eight months of marriage.
- July 3 – Kacey Musgraves and husband Ruston Kelly divorce after 2 1/2 years of marriage.
- July 4 – Kenny Chesney's "Here and Now" becomes his 31st number-one single on the Country Airplay chart, making Chesney the artist with the most number one singles on that chart.
- July 17 – The Chicks release their first studio album in 14 years, Gaslighter.
- July 29 – Garth Brooks withdraws himself from consideration for the CMA Entertainer of the Year category after seven wins.
- August 1 – Luke Combs marries Nicole Hocking in Florida, after 4 years of dating.
- August 16 - Singer Gabby Barrett announces her pregnancy with her first daughter with husband Cade Foeher.
- August 17 – Taylor Swift marks her return to country music radio in three years with the release of "Betty", off her Folklore album.
- August 25 - Singer Mickey Guyton announces her pregnancy for her first child with husband Grant Savoy.
- August 31 - Blanco Brown is involved in a motorcycle accident in which he breaks both arms, both legs, and his pelvis. He undergoes a twelve-hour surgery.
- September 16 – For the first time in history, the Academy of Country Music declares a tie for the Entertainer of the year award - Thomas Rhett and Carrie Underwood.
- October 27 – Blake Shelton and Gwen Stefani become engaged after 5 years of dating.
- November 21 – Jon Pardi marries Summer Duncan in Murfreesboro, Tennessee, after announcing their engagement in October 2019.
- November 30 – Jake Owen and Erica Hartlein become engaged after 3 years of dating.

== Top hits of the year ==
The following songs placed within the Top 20 on the Hot Country Songs, Country Airplay, or Canada Country charts in 2020:

=== Singles released by American and Australian artists ===
Songs	Airplay	Canada	Single	Artist	References
1	1	1	"10,000 Hours"	Dan + Shay featuring Justin Bieber	
7	1	2	"After a Few"	Travis Denning	
6	3	1	"Ain't Always the Cowboy"	Jon Pardi	
7	2	3	"Be a Light"	Thomas Rhett featuring Reba McEntire, Hillary Scott, Chris Tomlin & Keith Urban	
6	1	1	"Beer Can't Fix"	Thomas Rhett featuring Jon Pardi	
6	32	—	"Betty"	Taylor Swift	
3	1	1	"Big, Big Plans"	Chris Lane	
3	1	1	"Bluebird"	Miranda Lambert	
1	1	1	"The Bones"	Maren Morris	
5	1	3	"Catch"	Brett Young	
2	1	1	"Chasin' You"	Morgan Wallen	
5	3	3	"Cool Again"	Kane Brown	
12	—	—	"Dicked Down in Dallas"	Trey Lewis	
2	1	8	"Die from a Broken Heart"	Maddie & Tae	
17	6	42	"Dive Bar"	Garth Brooks and Blake Shelton	
4	1	1	"Does to Me"	Luke Combs featuring Eric Church	
8	1	3	"Done"	Chris Janson	
17	11	30	"Drinking Alone"	Carrie Underwood	
18	25	—	"Drowning"	Chris Young	
11	1	6	"Everywhere but On"	Matt Stell	
20	36	31	"Gaslighter"	The Chicks	
13	8	2	"God Whispered Your Name"	Keith Urban	
12	—	—	"Gone Too Soon"	Andrew Jannakos	
2	1	1	"Got What I Got"	Jason Aldean	
3	1	1	"Happy Anywhere"	Blake Shelton featuring Gwen Stefani	
3	1	2	"Hard to Forget"	Sam Hunt	
5	1	1	"Heartache Medication"	Jon Pardi	
10	—	—	"Heartless"	Diplo featuring Morgan Wallen	
7	1	1	"Here and Now"	Kenny Chesney	
14	17	15	"Homecoming Queen?"	Kelsea Ballerini	
5	1	1	"Homemade"	Jake Owen	
3	1	2	"Homesick"	Kane Brown	
8	2	4	"I Called Mama"	Tim McGraw	
1	1	2	"I Hope"	Gabby Barrett	
5	1	1	"I Hope You're Happy Now"	Carly Pearce & Lee Brice	
8	2	1	"I Love My Country"	Florida Georgia Line	
12	12	11	"I Wish Grandpas Never Died"	Riley Green	
12	1	12	"In Between"	Scotty McCreery	
3	1	2	"Kinfolks"	Sam Hunt	
18	—	—	"Last Time I Say Sorry"	Kane Brown & John Legend	
19	—	—	"Livin' the Dream"	Morgan Wallen	
19	12	43	"Lonely If You Are"	Chase Rice	
5	1	2	"Love You Like I Used To"	Russell Dickerson	
3	1	1	"Lovin' on You"	Luke Combs	
7	1	5	"Make Me Want To"	Jimmie Allen	
20	15	11	"Monsters"	Eric Church	
5	3	4	"More Hearts Than Mine"	Ingrid Andress	
2	1	1	"More Than My Hometown"	Morgan Wallen	
2	1	1	"Nobody but You"	Blake Shelton featuring Gwen Stefani	
4	1	1	"One Beer"	Hardy featuring Lauren Alaina & Devin Dawson	
8	2	1	"One Big Country Song"	LoCash	
2	1	1	"One Margarita"	Luke Bryan	
2	1	1	"One of Them Girls"	Lee Brice	
17	11	1	"One Night Standards"	Ashley McBryde	
19	52	—	"The Other Girl"	Kelsea Ballerini featuring Halsey	
18	—	—	"The Other Guy"	Luke Combs	
4	1	10	"Pretty Heart"	Parker McCollum	
5	1	10	"Ridin' Roads"	Dustin Lynch	
24	17	41	"She's Mine"	Kip Moore	
10	36	19	"Six Feet Apart"	Luke Combs	
6	1	15	"Slow Dance in a Parking Lot"	Jordan Davis	
5	1	3	"Some Girls"	Jameson Rodgers	
3	—	—	"Somebody's Problem"	Morgan Wallen	
23	22	14	"Stick That in Your Country Song"	Eric Church	
8	—	—	"Still Goin' Down"	Morgan Wallen	
8	6	1	"We Back"	Jason Aldean	
5	1	6	"What If I Never Get Over You"	Lady Antebellum	
6	1	2	"What She Wants Tonight"	Luke Bryan	
8	1	3	"Why We Drink"	Justin Moore	
15	—	—	"Without You"	Luke Combs featuring Amanda Shires	

=== Singles released by Canadian artists ===
Songs	Airplay	Canada	Single	Artist	References
—	—	20	"As If We Won't"	Jojo Mason	
—	—	1	"Canadian Summer"	Dean Brody	
—	—	1	"Can't Help Myself"	Dean Brody & The Reklaws	
—	—	8	"Close"	Jade Eagleson	
—	—	4	"Come As You Are"	Tenille Townes	
—	—	1	"Country Girls"	Jess Moskaluke	
—	—	2	"Country Thunder"	Washboard Union	
—	—	8	"Dock Rock"	Washboard Union	
—	—	1	"Drink About Me"	Brett Kissel	
—	—	12	"Everybody Knows Everybody"	Tenille Arts	
—	—	5	"Getcha"	Matt Lang	
—	—	20	"Girls Like Me"	Meghan Patrick	
—	—	9	"Good Ol' Bad Days"	Aaron Goodvin	
—	—	8	"The Good Ones"	Tebey & Marie Mai	
—	—	1	"Grew Up On That"	High Valley	
—	—	11	"Halfway Home"	Jess Moskaluke	
—	—	8	"Happened on a Saturday Night"	Tebey	
—	—	17	"Hard Dirt"	Hunter Brothers	
—	48	6	"I Don't Love You"	Lindsay Ell	
—	—	1	"I Would Be Over Me Too"	Tyler Joe Miller	
—	—	1	"Jersey on the Wall (I'm Just Asking)"	Tenille Townes	
—	—	13	"Kiss Kiss"	Madeline Merlo	
—	—	1	"Like a Man"	Dallas Smith	
—	—	1	"Lucky"	Jade Eagleson	
—	—	7	"Money On You"	Chad Brownlee	
—	—	1	"No Truck Song"	Tim Hicks	
—	—	4	"Old Country Soul"	Reklaws	
—	—	1	"Pillow Talkin'"	Tyler Joe Miller	
—	—	1	"Seeing Other People"	MacKenzie Porter	
—	—	12	"She Drives Me Crazy"	Brett Kissel	
—	—	11	"Silver Lining"	Hunter Brothers	
—	—	15	"Summer Time"	James Barker Band	
45	56	1	"These Days"	MacKenzie Porter	
—	—	1	"Timeless"	Dallas Smith	
35	58	1	"Want Me Back"	Lindsay Ell	
—	—	19	"When You Know You Know"	Tim & the Glory Boys	
—	—	2	"Where I'm From"	The Reklaws	

== Top new album releases ==
The following albums placed on the Top Country Albums charts in 2020:

US	Album	Artist	Record label	Release date	Reference
5	6-Pack (EP)	Florida Georgia Line	BMLG	May 22	
6	The Album, Part 1	Chase Rice	Dack Janiels	January 31	
9	Ballerini	Kelsea Ballerini	Black River	September 11	
1	Born Here Live Here Die Here	Luke Bryan	Capitol Nashville	August 7	
6	Carly Pearce	Carly Pearce	Big Machine	February 14	
6	Chris Tomlin & Friends	Chris Tomlin	Sparrow/Capitol	July 31	
2	Cuttin' Grass, Vol. 1: The Butcher Shoppe Sessions	Sturgill Simpson	High Top Mountain	October 15	
6	Diplo Presents Thomas Wesley, Chapter 1: Snake Oil	Diplo	Columbia	May 29	
6	Everlasting Country	Upchurch	Stonebaby Sounds	April 20	
5	First Rose of Spring	Willie Nelson	Legacy	July 3	
7	Fun	Garth Brooks	Pearl Records	November 20	
1	Gaslighter	The Chicks	Columbia	July 17	
4	Goldmine	Gabby Barrett	Warner Music Nashville	June 19	
1	Here and Now	Kenny Chesney	Warner Music Nashville	May 1	
1	Here on Earth	Tim McGraw	Big Machine	August 21	
7	Hey World	Lee Brice	Curb Records	November 20	
10	Hollywood Gold (EP)	Parker McCollum	MCA Nashville	October 16	
2	Kelsea	Kelsea Ballerini	Black River	March 20	
9	Lady Like	Ingrid Andress	Warner Music Nashville	March 27	
1	Life on the Flip Side	Jimmy Buffett	Mailboat Records	May 29	
6	Long Violent History	Tyler Childers	Hickman Holler	September 18	
2	Mixtape, Vol. 1 (EP)	Kane Brown	RCA Nashville	August 14	
5	Never Will	Ashley McBryde	Warner Music Nashville	April 3	
1	Nightfall	Little Big Town	Capitol Nashville	January 17	
1	Reunions	Jason Isbell	Southeastern Records	May 8	
4	A Rock	Hardy	Big Loud	September 4	
4	Skeletons	Brothers Osborne	EMI Nashville	October 9	
1	Southside	Sam Hunt	MCA Nashville	April 3	
1	The Speed of Now Part 1	Keith Urban	Capitol Nashville	September 18	
1	Starting Over	Chris Stapleton	Mercury Nashville	November 13	
5	Sunday Drive	Brett Eldredge	Atlantic Nashville	July 10	
4	Tullahoma	Dustin Lynch	Broken Bow	January 17	
9	Twenty Years of Rascal Flatts: The Greatest Hits	Rascal Flatts	Big Machine Records	October 2	
7	The Way It Feels	Maddie & Tae	Mercury Nashville	April 10	
8	Western Swing & Waltzes and Other Punchy Songs	Colter Wall	La Honda / Thirty Tigers	August 28	
5	Wild World	Kip Moore	MCA Nashville	May 29	
1	My Gift	Carrie Underwood	Capitol Nashville	September 25	

=== Other top albums ===
US	Album	Artist	Record label	Release date	Reference
20	Beer's Better Cold (EP)	Travis Denning	Mercury Nashville	May 15	
26	Bettie James (EP)	Jimmie Allen	Stoney Creek	July 10	
28	Canyons	Gone West	Triple Tigers	June 12	
17	Country Fuzz	The Cadillac Three	BMLG	February 7	
14	Country State of Mind	Josh Turner	MCA Nashville	August 21	
35	The Dirt and the Stars	Mary Chapin Carpenter	Lambent Light	August 7	
32	En Español	The Mavericks	Mono Mundo	August 21	
28	Getting Good (EP)	Lauren Alaina	Mercury Nashville/Interscope/19	March 6	
44	Ghosts of West Virginia	Steve Earle	New West Records	May 22	
33	Heart Theory	Lindsay Ell	Stoney Creek	August 14	
35	How They Remember You (EP)	Rascal Flatts	Big Machine	July 31	
16	Jordan Davis (EP)	Jordan Davis	MCA Nashville	May 22	
16	Lamentations	American Aquarium	New West Records	May 1	
41	The Lemonade Stand	Tenille Townes	Columbia Nashville	June 26	
42	McGraw Machine Hits: 2013-2019	Tim McGraw	Big Machine Records	November 20	
18	The Otherside	Cam	RCA/Triple Tigers	October 30	
17	Re-Dunn	Ronnie Dunn	Little Willy Records	January 10	
46	Show Pony	Orville Peck	Columbia/Sub Pop	August 14	
14	Southern Symphony	Russell Dickerson	Triple Tigers	December 4	
17	That's How Rumors Get Started	Margo Price	Loma Vista	July 10	
16	Triple Live Deluxe	Garth Brooks	Pearl Records	November 20	
46	Your Life Is a Record	Brandy Clark	Warner Bros.	March 6	

== Deaths ==
- January 15 – Chris Darrow, 75, American musician (Nitty Gritty Dirt Band), complications from a stroke.
- January 18 – David Olney, 71, American singer-songwriter, heart attack.
- January 29 – Eddie Setser, 77, American songwriter ("Seven Spanish Angels")
- February 12 – Paul English, 87, American drummer (Willie Nelson), pneumonia.
- March 1 – Jan Vyčítal, 77, Czech caricaturist and country music singer-songwriter.
- March 7 – Jim Owen, 78, American country singer-songwriter.
- March 20 – Kenny Rogers, 81, American country singer and songwriter who was responsible for having major crossover success in the 1970s and 1980s (natural causes).
- March 22 – Eric Weissberg, 80, American folk musician ("Dueling Banjos", The Tarriers), complications from Alzheimer's disease.
- March 28 – Jan Howard, 91, country music singer-songwriter and Grand Ole Opry member who had a string of chart singles during the 1960s and 1970s (natural causes).
- March 29 – Joe Diffie, 61, country music singer-songwriter who was responsible for a plethora of hits throughout the '90s and early '00s such as "Pickup Man", "John Deere Green" and "Third Rock from the Sun". (COVID-19)
- April 7 – John Prine, 73, American country-folk singer-songwriter. (COVID-19)
- April 15 – Gary McSpadden, 77, American gospel singer, former member of The Oak Ridge Boys.
- April 24 – Harold Reid, 80, member of The Statler Brothers (kidney failure)
- May 11 - Fuzzy Owen, 91, Pioneer of the Bakersfield Sound; songwriter and longtime manager of Merle Haggard
- June 2 – Jimmy Capps, 81, Nashville musician; member of the Grand Ole Opry house band and The Nashville A-Team.
- June 8 – James Hand, 67, American country music singer-songwriter.
- June 12 – Larry W. Johnson, 69, songwriter ("Don't Take the Girl")
- July 3 – Craig J. Martin, 52, songwriter ("Don't Take the Girl") (heart attack)
- July 6 – Charlie Daniels, 83, country music and Southern rock legend best known for "The Devil Went Down to Georgia", "Long Haired Country Boy", "The South's Gonna Do It" and many others. (stroke)
- July 15 - Kenny Dale, 67, American singer (COVID-19)
- July 16 – Jamie Oldaker, 68, American drummer (Eric Clapton, The Tractors).
- July 30 — Randy Barlow, 77, American country singer-songwriter (cancer)
- July 31 — Bill Mack, 91, American country disc jockey and songwriter ("Blue", "Drinking Champagne") (COVID-19)
- August 18 — Steve Gulley, 57, American bluegrass singer-songwriter, pancreatic cancer.
- August 23 — Justin Townes Earle, 38, American singer-songwriter, son of Steve Earle.
- September 11 — Troy Jones, 64, Nashville songwriter (“People Are Crazy”, “Shiftwork”, "Pretty Good at Drinkin' Beer")
- September 21 — Roy Head, 79, American singer-songwriter best known for his 1965 pop hit "Treat Her Right" and charted several country hits in the 1970s and 1980s. (heart attack)
- September 23 — W. S. Holland, 85, American drummer (The Tennessee Three).
- September 29 — Mac Davis, 78, American singer-songwriter known for many hits such as "In the Ghetto", "Baby, Don't Get Hooked on Me", and "It's Hard to Be Humble" (complications from heart bypass surgery)
- October 7 — Ray Pennington, 86, American singer-songwriter ("I'm a Ramblin' Man") (house fire)
- October 16 — Johnny Bush, 85, American singer-songwriter ("Whiskey River").
- October 22 – Margie Bowes, 79, American singer
- October 23 — Jerry Jeff Walker, 78, American singer-songwriter ("Mr. Bojangles"), throat cancer.
- October 24 — J. T. Corenflos, 56, session guitarist (cancer)
- October 28 — Billy Joe Shaver, 81, American singer-songwriter ("I'm Just an Old Chunk of Coal (But I'm Gonna Be a Diamond Someday)" (stroke).
- November 13 — Doug Supernaw, 60, American singer-songwriter who netted several 1990s hits ("I Don't Call Him Daddy", "Reno", "Not Enough Hours in the Night"), lung and bladder cancer.
- November 23 — Hal Ketchum, 67, American singer-songwriter who scored a string of hits during the 1990s ("Small Town Saturday Night", "Past the Point of Rescue", "Hearts Are Gonna Roll"), dementia.
- December 12 — Charley Pride, 86, American singer-songwriter; known as country music's first African-American superstar (“Kiss an Angel Good Mornin’”, “Is Anybody Goin’ to San Antone” and many others), COVID-19.
- December 21 — K. T. Oslin, 78, American singer-songwriter who scored a string of hits during the late 1980s and early 90's ("80's Ladies", "I'll Always Come Back", "Do Ya" and others), Parkinson's disease and COVID-19.
- December 25 — Tony Rice, 69, American guitarist and bluegrass singer and member of the New South and Bluegrass Album Band known for his elegant flatpicking style.
- December 29 — Hugh X. Lewis, 90, American singer-songwriter.

== Hall of Fame inductees ==
=== Bluegrass Hall of Fame ===
- J. T. Gray - owner of the Station Inn in Nashville which opened in 1974 and noted as one of the best bluegrass venue in the world
- Johnson Mountain Boys - a popular group in the 1980s known for their neotraditional style
- New Grass Revival - progressive band that produced many of the genres most respected musicians

=== Country Music Hall of Fame ===
(presented on November 21, 2021)

- Dean Dillon, songwriter known for his work with George Strait and songs by other artists such as "Tennessee Whiskey", "Set 'Em Up Joe", "Is It Raining at Your House" and "Spilled Perfume".
- Marty Stuart, singer-songwriter, musician, television host and country music historian with hits including "Hillbilly Rock" and "The Whiskey Ain't Workin'".
- Hank Williams Jr., singer-songwriter and musician known for hits such as "All My Rowdy Friends Are Coming Over Tonight", "A Country Boy Can Survive" and "Family Tradition".

== Major awards ==
=== Academy of Country Music Awards ===
(presented on April 18, 2021)

- Entertainer of the Year – Luke Bryan
- Male Artist of the Year – Thomas Rhett
- Female Artist of the Year – Maren Morris
- Group of the Year – Old Dominion
- Duo of the Year – Dan + Shay
- New Male Artist of the Year – Jimmie Allen
- New Female Artist of the Year – Gabby Barrett
- Songwriter of the Year – Hillary Lindsey
- Single of the Year – "I Hope You're Happy Now" (Carly Pearce and Lee Brice)
- Song of the Year – "The Bones" (Jimmy Robbins, Maren Morris, Laura Veltz)
- Album of the Year – Starting Over (Chris Stapleton)
- Musical Event of the Year – "I Hope You're Happy Now" (Carly Pearce and Lee Brice)
- Video of the Year – "Worldwide Beautiful" (Kane Brown)

=== American Music Awards ===
(presented on November 22, 2020)

- Favorite Country Album – Fully Loaded: God's Country (Blake Shelton
- Favorite Country Song – "10,000 Hours" (Dan + Shay featuring Justin Bieber)
- Favorite Male Country Artist – Kane Brown
- Favorite Female Country Artist – Maren Morris
- Favorite Country Duo/Group – Dan + Shay

=== ARIA Awards ===
(presented on November 25, 2020)

- Best Country Album - Fallow (Fanny Lumsden)

=== Billboard Music Awards ===
(presented on October 14, 2020)

- Top Country Artist – Luke Combs
- Top Country Male Artist – Luke Combs
- Top Country Female Artist – Maren Morris
- Top Country Duo/Group – Dan + Shay
- Top Country Album – What You See Is What You Get (Luke Combs)
- Top Country Song – "10,000 Hours" (Dan + Shay and Justin Bieber)
- Top Country Tour – George Strait

=== CMT Music Awards ===
(presented on October 21, 2020, in Nashville)

- Video of the Year - Carrie Underwood - "Drinking Alone"
- Male Video of the Year - Luke Bryan - "One Margarita"
- Female Video of the Year - Carrie Underwood - "Drinking Alone"
- Breakthrough Video of the Year - Gabby Barrett - "I Hope"
- Group Video of the Year - Old Dominion - "One Man Band"
- Duo Video of the Year - Dan + Shay - "I Should Probably Go to Bed"
- Equal Play Award - Jennifer Nettles

CMT Artists of the Year
(presented June 3, 2020 in Nashville)

- Kelsea Ballerini
- Brothers Osborne
- Florida Georgia Line
- Miranda Lambert
- Lady Antebellum
- Little Big Town
- Thomas Rhett

=== Country Music Association Awards ===
(presented on November 11, 2020)

- Entertainer of the Year – Eric Church
- Male Vocalist of the Year – Luke Combs
- Female Vocalist of the Year – Maren Morris
- Vocal Group of the Year – Old Dominion
- New Artist of the Year – Morgan Wallen
- Vocal Duo of the Year – Dan + Shay
- Musician of the Year – Jenee Fleenor (fiddle)
- Single of the Year – "The Bones" - Maren Morris
- Song of the Year – "The Bones" - Maren Morris, Jimmy Robinson, Laura Veltz
- Album of the Year – What You See Is What You Get (Luke Combs)
- Musical Event of the Year – "I Hope You're Happy Now" (Carly Pearce and Lee Brice)
- Video of the Year – "Bluebird" (Miranda Lambert, directed by Trey Fanjoy)
- Willie Nelson Lifetime Achievement Award – Charley Pride
- Jeff Walker Global Country Artist Award – Ilse DeLange (The Netherlands)

=== Grammy Awards ===
(presented in Los Angeles on March 14, 2021)

- Best Country Solo Performance – "When My Amy Prays" (Vince Gill)
- Best Country Duo/Group Performance – "10,000 Hours" (Dan + Shay ft. Justin Bieber)
- Best Country Song – "Crowded Table" (Brandi Carlile, Natalie Hemby, Lori McKenna)
- Best Country Album – ''Wildcard (Miranda Lambert)
- Best Bluegrass Album – Home (Billy Strings)
- Best Americana Album – World on the Ground (Sarah Jarosz)
- Best American Roots Performance – "I Remember Everything" (John Prine)
- Best American Roots Song – "I Remember Everything" (Pat McLaughlin and John Prine)
- Best Roots Gospel Album – Celebrating Fisk! (The 150th Anniversary Album) (Fisk Jubilee Singers)

=== International Bluegrass Music Awards ===
(presented on October 1, 2020)

- Entertainer of the Year – Sister Sadie
- Male Vocalist of the Year – Danny Paisley
- Female Vocalist of the Year – Brooke Aldridge
- Vocal Group of the Year – Sister Sadie
- Instrumental Group of the Year – Michael Cleveland and Flamekeeper
- New Artist of the Year – Mile Twelve
- Guitar Player of the Year – Jake Workman
- Banjo Player of the Year – Scott Vestal
- Mandolin Player of the Year – Alan Bibey
- Fiddle Player of the Year – Deanie Richardson
- Bass Player of the Year – Missy Raines
- Dobro Player of the Year – Justin Moses
- Album of the Year – Live in Prague (Doyle Lawson and Quicksilver)
- Song of the Year – "Chicago Barn Dance" (Alison Brown, Becky Buller, Missy Raines)
- Collaborative Recording of the Year – "The Barber's Fiddle" (Becky Buller with Shawn Camp, Jason Carter, Laurie Lewis, Kati Penn, Sam Bush, Michael Cleveland, Johnny Warren, Stuart Duncan, Deanie Richardson, Bronwyn Keith-Hynes, Jason Barie, Fred Carpenter, Tyler Andal, Nate Lee, Dan Boner, Brian Christianson, and Laura Orshaw
- Instrumental Recorded Performance of the Year – "Tall Fidler" (Michael Cleveland and Tommy Emmanuel)
- Gospel Recorded Performance of the Year – "Gonna Rise and Shine" (Alan Bibey and Grasstowne)

=== Juno Awards ===
(presented on June 6, 2021 in Toronto)

- Country Album of the Year - The Lemonade Stand (Tenille Townes)

=== Kennedy Center Honors ===
Country stars who were honored in 2020

Garth Brooks
