= 1942 in country music =

This is a list of notable events in country music that took place in the year 1942.

== Events ==
- March 18, 20, 21 – Al Dexter holds 3-day recording sessions at CBS Sunset Studios, jamming with top session musicians, and recording around 20 songs. The coming musicians' strike was not foreseen at the time, but the extensive recording helped Dexter release singles until 1945, when Columbia finally settled with the union, and Dexter was able to record new material.
- August 1 – The American Federation of Musicians authorizes a ban on recording by bands following a dispute over musicians' royalties; many country and popular music singers opt to continue recording without musical backing. The strike – which came to be known as the Petrillo ban – lingers into 1943.
- October 3 – Acuff-Rose Music, Inc., is incorporated in Tennessee. Fred Rose is the chief of creative activities, while Mildred Acuff takes care of business matters. Subsidiary corporations formed were Acuff-Rose Publications, Inc. (for BMI affiliated artists) and Milene Music, Inc. (ASCAP affiliated publisher). The former published four songs on January 28, 1943, all Fred Rose compositions under the pseudonym "Floyd Jenkins." "Low and lonely" and "Pins and Needles (In My Heart)" were two of the songs (see 1943 Top Hits of the Year).

== Top Hillbilly-Folk (Country) Recordings 1942 ==
The Top Hillbilly-Folk Records of the Year chart was derived from Billboard magazine's 'Hillbilly Hits' chart from January and February 1942, then The Billboard's weekly "American Folk Records" columns Feb-December 1942, with raw reports from nationwide jukebox operators, and summaries of the top records in the nation. Supplemental information came from 'Joel Whitburn's Pop Memories 1890-1954', record sales reported on the "Discography of American Historical Recordings" website, and other sources as specified. As always, numerical rankings are approximate.

| Rank | Artist | Title | Label | Recorded | Released | Chart Positions |
|---|---|---|---|---|---|---|
| 1 | Elton Britt | "There's a Star Spangled Banner Waving Somewhere" | Bluebird 9000 | March 19, 1942 | May 8, 1942 | US Billboard 1942 #96, US Pop #14, US Hillbilly 1942 #1, 1943 #3, Hillbilly #1 for 30 weeks, 68 total weeks, 1,000,000 sales |
| 2 | Carson Robison | "1942 Turkey in the Straw" | Bluebird 11460 | January 26, 1942 | March 21, 1942 | US Billboard 1942 #159, US Pop #22, US Hillbilly 1942 #2, Hillbilly #1 for 8 weeks, 66 total weeks |
| 3 | Gene Autry | "Tweedle-O-Twill" | Okeh 6680 | February 24, 1942 | May 8, 1942 | US BB 1944 #170, US Pop #30, US Hillbilly 1942 #3, Hillbilly #1 for 13 weeks, 59 total weeks, 1,000,000 sales |
| 4 | Ernest Tubb | "When the World Has Turned You Down" | Decca 6023 | April 26, 1941 | March 14, 1942 | US Hillbilly 1942 #4, Hillbilly #2 for 3 weeks, 49 total weeks |
| 5 | Elton Britt | "I Hung My Head And Cried" | Bluebird 9023 | March 19, 1942 | July 1942 | US Hillbilly 1942 #5, Hillbilly #2 for 2 weeks, 38 total weeks |
| 6 | Zeke Manners | "When My Blue Moon Turns To Gold Again" | Bluebird 9020 | March 4, 1942 | July 17, 1942 | US Hillbilly 1942 #6, Hillbilly #1 for 2 weeks, 29 total weeks |
| 7 | Al Dexter and His Troopers | "Meet Me Down in Honky Tonk Town" | Okeh 6483 | March 4, 1941 | November 1941 | US Hillbilly 1942 #7, Hillbilly #1 for 1 week, 20 total weeks |
| 8 | Jimmie Revard And His Oklahoma Playboys | "My Little Girl I Love You" | Bluebird 6877 | February 26, 1937 | October 1941 | US Hillbilly 1942 #8, Hillbilly #1 for 2 weeks, 27 total weeks |
| 9 | Jimmy Wakely | "Don't Bite the Hand That's Feeding You" | Decca 5997 | October 27, 1941 | November 3, 1941 | US Hillbilly 1942 #9, Hillbilly #1 for 2 weeks, 20 total weeks |
| 10 | Roy Acuff and his Smoky Mountain Boys | "Wreck On The Highway" | Okeh 6685 | June 20, 1942 | July 1942 | US Hillbilly 1942 #10, Hillbilly #1 for 1 week, 19 total weeks |
| 11 | Gene Autry | "Deep in the Heart of Texas" | Okeh 6643 | February 24, 1942 | April 1942 | US Hillbilly 1942 #11, Hillbilly #1 for 1 week, 13 total weeks |
| 12 | Darrell Fischer and his Log-Jammers | "Turkey In The Straw" | Standard T-2061 | June 1942 | July 1942 | US Hillbilly 1942 #12, Hillbilly #4 for 3 week, 22 total weeks |
| 13 | Bob Wills and His Texas Playboys | "Cherokee Maiden" | Okeh 6685 | June 20, 1942 | July 1942 | US Hillbilly 1942 #13, Hillbilly #1 for 1 week, 16 total weeks |
| 14 | Carson Robison | "We're Gonna Slap The Dirty Little Jap" | Bluebird 11414 | December 18, 1941 | January 1942 | US Hillbilly 1942 #14, Hillbilly #1 for 1 week, 18 total weeks |
| 15 | Roy Acuff and his Smoky Mountain Boys | "Fireball Mail" | Okeh 6685 | June 20, 1942 | July 1942 | US Hillbilly 1942 #15, Hillbilly #2 for 2 weeks, 18 total weeks |
| 16 | Bob Wills and His Texas Playboys | "Corrine Corrina" | Okeh 6530 | April 15, 1940 | December 1941 | US Billboard 1942 #229, US #22, US Hillbilly 1942 #16, Hillbilly #2 for 2 weeks, 18 total weeks |
| 17 | Bob Wills and His Texas Playboys | "Oh! You Pretty Woman" | Okeh 6685 | June 20, 1942 | July 1942 | US Hillbilly 1942 #17, Hillbilly #2 for 1 week, 14 total weeks |
| 18 | Denver Darling And His Texas Cowhands | "Modern Cannon Ball" | Decca 6063 | July 14, 1942 | July 27, 1942 | US Hillbilly 1942 #18, Hillbilly #2 for 2 weeks, 33 total weeks |
| 19 | Ernest Tubb | "I Ain't Honky Tonkin' Anymore" | Decca 6007 | November 17, 1941 | December 16, 1941 | US Hillbilly 1942 #19, Hillbilly #2 for 1 week, 36 total weeks |
| 20 | Gene Autry | "Rainbow On The Rio Colorado" | Okeh 6685 | June 20, 1942 | July 1942 | US Hillbilly 1942 #20, Hillbilly #2 for 1 week, 36 total weeks |

== Births ==
- January 21 – Mac Davis, singer-songwriter who rose to prominence in the 1970s. (died 2020)
- March 15 – Wayland Holyfield, songwriter whose compositions were popular during the 1970s and 1980s.
- March 19 – Richard Dobson, singer-songwriter (died 2017).
- March 26 – Larry Butler, producer best known for his association with Kenny Rogers (died 2012).
- May 5 – Tammy Wynette, "The First Lady of Country Music" (died 1998).
- May 8 – Jack Blanchard, singer-songwriter who, with wife Misty Morgan, had a string of animal-themed hit recordings in the 1970s.
- May 15 – K. T. Oslin, singer who rose to fame during the 1980s, after she had reached her mid-40s (died 2020).
- August 7 – B.J. Thomas, pop-styled vocalist of the 1970s and 1980s. (Died (died 2021)
- September 6 – Mel McDaniel, honky tonk-styled singer of the 1980s (died 2011).
- October 27 – Lee Greenwood, singer-songwriter of the 1980s, best known for the patriotic anthem "God Bless the USA".
- November 8 – Donnie Fritts, American session musician and songwriter (died 2019).
