= This Bar =

2019 song by Morgan Wallen

Promotional single by Morgan Wallen

from the album Dangerous: The Double Album
- Released: December 31, 2019
- Genre: Country
- Length: 3:05
- Label: Big Loud
- Songwriters: Morgan Wallen; Michael Hardy; Jackson Morgan; Jake Scott; Ernest Keith Smith; Ryan Vojtesak
- Producer: Joey Moi

Lyric video
- "This Bar" on YouTube

"This Bar" is a song co-written and recorded by American country music singer Morgan Wallen. The song was co-written with Michael Hardy, Jackson Morgan, Jake Scott, Ernest Keith Smith, and Ryan Vojtesak. It was the second promotional single from Wallen's sophomore album Dangerous: The Double Album.

== Background ==
Prior to the song's official release, Wallen occasionally performed "This Bar" as part of his live show. The track was officially released on New Year's Eve in 2019. Wallen stated: "Wrote this song with my buddies about some moments and times in my life that have made me who I am today. Some good, some bad, but all of em I can look back on and grin a little".

== Critical reception ==
Lauren Hoffman of Taste of Country called the song a "feel-good track" and a "refreshing take on what we can learn from our experiences". Jon Freeman of Rolling Stone referred to it as "anthemic" noting Wallen's "impassioned vocals". Country Music Tattletale described the song as a "nostalgic tip-of-the-hat to late nights and locales".

== Commercial performance ==
"This Bar" peaked at number 29 on Billboard Hot Country Songs for the week of January 18, 2020. It entered the Hot 100 in the United States at number 92 and the Canadian Hot 100 at number 81 for the week of January 23, 2021, following the release of Wallen's album. It has been certified Platinum by Music Canada and 3× Platinum by RIAA.

== Charts ==
=== Weekly charts ===
Chart (2020–2021)	Peak position
Canada Hot 100 (Billboard)	81
US Billboard Hot 100	92
US Hot Country Songs (Billboard)	29

=== Year-end charts ===
Chart (2020)	Position
US Hot Country Songs (Billboard)	92

== Certifications ==
Region	Certification	Certified units/sales
Australia (ARIA)	Platinum	70,000^{‡}
Canada (Music Canada)	2× Platinum	160,000^{‡}
New Zealand (RMNZ)	Gold	15,000^{‡}
United States (RIAA)	3× Platinum	3,000,000^{‡}
^{‡} Sales+streaming figures based on certification alone.

== Release history ==
Region	Date	Format	Label
Various	December 31, 2019	Digital download	Big Loud
Various	December 31, 2019	Streaming	Big Loud
