= Whiskey'd My Way =

2021 song by Morgan Wallen

Song by Morgan Wallen

from the album Dangerous: The Double Album
- Released: January 8, 2021
- Genre: Country
- Length: 3:00
- Label: Big Loud; Republic
- Songwriters: Matt Dragstrem; Josh Miller; Thomas Rhett; Josh Thompson
- Producer: Joey Moi

Lyric video
- "Whiskey'd My Way" on YouTube

"Whiskey'd My Way" is a song by American country music singer Morgan Wallen. It was released on January 8, 2021, through Big Loud and Republic Records as the ninth track from his second studio album Dangerous: The Double Album. The song was written by Matt Dragstrem, Josh Miller, Thomas Rhett, and Josh Thompson while being produced by Joey Moi. A bro-country song, "Whiskey'd My Way" primarily explores themes of breakup and drinking, namely Wallen's extensive liking to whiskey.

"Whiskey'd My Way" received praise from music critics, many naming the song as a highlight from Dangerous: The Double Album due to its soulful lyrics and upbeat energy. The Musical Divine praised the song for its firm acoustics and ranked it among the best songs from Dangerous: The Double Album. "Whiskey'd My Way" performed moderately commercially, charting on the US Billboard Hot 100, US Hot Country Songs, the Canadian Hot 100, and the Billboard Global 200.

== Background and composition ==
"Whiskey'd My Way" was recorded sometime in 2020 along with the other 32 tracks from Dangerous: The Double Album. Wallen wrote the song with Matt Dragstrem, Josh Miller, Thomas Rhett, and Josh Thompson while Joey Moi produced the song. Thomas Rhett, the primary songwriter for the track, originally wrote "Whiskey'd My Way" for himself and didn't want to give it up—along with "Your Bartender". Rhett admitted that the song was hard for him to give up but decided to since he claimed that multiple songs that he recorded at the time covered the same topics. Wallen liked both "Whiskey'd My Way" and "Your Bartender" and decided to record the two songs after receiving approval from Rhett.

Musically, "Whiskey'd My Way" is a country song that leans heavy on the bro-country sound and has a guitar used in the instrumental. The song starts with the first verse and begins with the topic of Wallen being broke-up with in a relationship, with the lyrics "You thought I'd die, When you said goodbye, For a minute I thought that I would". In the second verse Wallen sings "You saw me out, On a Friday downtown, With a smile that came stumblin' back in", and "Guess that killed your mood 'cause you did what you do, Turned around and walked out again". This indicates that the undisclosed woman smiled, which Wallen thought that her smile was rememberable but after seeing him, she would walk out of the bar in an angry mood. The songs chorus resembles Wallen's strong liking of whiskey to cope with hard times and that hanging with his friends, mother, listening to old-fashioned music, and dancing with women new to him don't help him cope with hard times. Respectively with the chorus being: "It wasn't my buddies, It wasn't my mamma, It wasn't no self-help how to, It wasn't old records, It wasn't old flings, Or dancin' with somebody new, Tequila made me crazy, cold beer wouldn't do, so I Whiskey'd my way over you".

== Reception ==
=== Critical ===
"Whiskey'd My Way" received positive critical reception from music critics, many of which considered the song to be a highlight from Dangerous: The Double Album. The Musical Divine praised the song for its soulful, meaningful lyricism and it's firm acoustics. Taste of Country would rank "Whiskey'd My Way" at number 17 on their list of Wallen's best songs, above "Your Bartender", "865", and "Stand Alone".

=== Commercial ===
Commercially, the song performed moderately. In the United States, "Whiskey'd My Way" debuted and peaked at number 83 on the Billboard Hot 100 dated January 23, 2021–debuting alongside 19 other tracks from Dangerous: The Double Album. The track would also debut alongside 27 of the other tracks from Dangerous: The Double Album, debuting and peaking at number 27 on the Billboard Hot Country Songs chart. Outside of the United States, "Whiskey'd My Way" would debut and peak at number 70 on the Canadian Hot 100, charting alongside 23 additional tracks from Dangerous: The Double Album. Globally, the track would debut and peak at number 160 on the Billboard Global 200, charting alongside 17 tracks from Dangerous: The Double Album.

== Charts ==
Weekly chart performance for "Whiskey'd My Way"
Chart (2021)	Peak position
Canada Hot 100 (Billboard)	70
Global 200 (Billboard)	160
US Billboard Hot 100	83
US Hot Country Songs (Billboard)	27

== Certifications ==
Region	Certification	Certified units/sales
United States (RIAA)	Platinum	1,000,000^{‡}
^{‡} Sales+streaming figures based on certification alone.
