= Dangerous (Morgan Wallen song) =

2021 song by Morgan Wallen

Song by Morgan Wallen

from the album Dangerous: The Double Album
- Released: January 8, 2021
- Genre: Pop; country pop
- Length: 2:27
- Label: Big Loud; Republic
- Songwriters: Morgan Wallen; Ernest Keith Smith
- Producer: Joey Moi

Lyric video
- "Dangerous" on YouTube

"Dangerous" is a song recorded by American country music singer Morgan Wallen. It was from his second studio album Dangerous: The Double Album. The song was co-wrote by Wallen and Ernest Keith Smith, and produced by Joey Moi.

== Background ==
"Dangerous" was inspired by a night he had spent in downtown Nashville, which ended with Wallen being arrested for public intoxication and disorderly conduct outside of Kid Rock's honky-tonk. He said: "I don't wanna go downtown, doing what we used to", he sings on the track. "Twist the top off another round, hell, I got enough loose screws…Think I'm gonna stay right here tonight/ Cause that could be dangerous". So he wanted to write "a warning" to himself.

== Charts ==
=== Weekly charts ===
Weekly chart performance for "Dangerous"
| Chart (2021) | Peak position |
|---|---|
| Canada Hot 100 (Billboard) | 53 |
| Global 200 (Billboard) | 116 |
| US Billboard Hot 100 | 62 |
| US Hot Country Songs (Billboard) | 17 |

=== Year-end charts ===
Year-end chart performance for "Dangerous"
| Chart (2021) | Position |
|---|---|
| US Hot Country Songs (Billboard) | 79 |

== Certifications ==
| Region | Certification | Certified units/sales |
|---|---|---|
| Australia (ARIA) | Gold | 35,000^{‡} |
| Canada (Music Canada) | Platinum | 80,000^{‡} |
| United States (RIAA) | 2× Platinum | 2,000,000^{‡} |
^{‡} Sales+streaming figures based on certification alone.
