= Flower Shops =

2021 Single by Ernest featuring Morgan Wallen

Single by Ernest featuring Morgan Wallen

from the album Flower Shops (The Album)
- Released: December 31, 2021
- Genre: Country
- Length: 3:34
- Label: Big Loud
- Songwriters: Ben Burgess; Ernest Keith Smith; Mark Holman
- Producer: Joey Moi

Ernest singles chronology
"American Rust" (2021)	"Flower Shops" (2021)	"Cowgirls" (2024)

Morgan Wallen singles chronology
"Broadway Girls" (2021)	"Flower Shops" (2021)	"Wasted on You" (2022)

Music video
- "Flower Shops" on YouTube

"Flower Shops" is a song by American country music artist Ernest featuring country music singer Morgan Wallen. It was released on December 31, 2021, as the lead single from Ernest's second studio album Flower Shops (The Album). The song was written by Ben Burgess, Ernest and Mark Holman, and produced by Joey Moi. It also marks the two artists' first collaboration.

== Promotion ==
In late December 2021, Wallen posted a teaser photo on Instagram of he and Ernest sitting on stools and holding guitars, captioning it "Flower Shops open at Midnight tonight".

== Content ==
Ernest said in a press release that he created the song with Ben Burgess and Mark Holman, and explained that the song was inspired by country music singer "George Jones's sad country songs". He said: "I didn't have a hard time going there because I know damn well what it's like to run out of apologies, and though flowers aren't ever going to fix it, it's just about all you can do sometimes". Carena Liptak of Taste of Country wrote that the song tells the story of a "love that's lost and never coming back — a classic country storyline".

The song is in the key of G major with a 6/8 time signature. It has a "shuffle" tempo of approximately 44 beats per minute, and the verses are mainly based around the chord pattern G–Am–D/F♯–D^{7}.

== Critical reception ==
Chris Parton of Sounds Like Nashville commented that the song "[is] a clever, throwback duet" and "a classic done-her-wrong apology anthem".

== Other versions ==
On February 14, 2022, Ernest and Wallen released the song's acoustic version.

== Chart performance ==
"Flower Shops" debuted at number 68 on the Billboard Hot 100 chart dated January 15, 2022, becoming Ernest's first entry on the chart. Despite peaking at number 64, "Flower Shops" was able to enter the 2022 Billboard year-end at number 96, becoming the lowest peaking song to enter a year-end chart up until "No Pole" by Don Toliver made it to the year-end in 2025 despite peaking at number 66.

== Charts ==
=== Weekly charts ===
Weekly chart performance for "Flower Shops"
Chart (2022)	Peak position
Canada Hot 100 (Billboard)	62
Canada Country (Billboard)	16
Global 200 (Billboard)	192
New Zealand Hot Singles (RMNZ)	20
US Billboard Hot 100	64
US Country Airplay (Billboard)	18
US Hot Country Songs (Billboard)	13

=== Year-end charts ===
2022 year-end chart performance for "Flower Shops"
Chart (2022)	Position
US Billboard Hot 100	96
US Country Airplay (Billboard)	56
US Hot Country Songs (Billboard)	30

== Certifications ==
Region	Certification	Certified units/sales
United States (RIAA)	2× Platinum	2,000,000^{‡}
^{‡} Sales+streaming figures based on certification alone.

== Release history ==
Release history for "Flower Shops"
Region	Date	Format	Label	Ref.
Various	December 31, 2021	Digital download; streaming	Big Loud	
United States	January 24, 2022	Country radio	Big Loud	
