= Flower Shops (The Album) =

Studio album by Ernest
- Released: March 11, 2022
- Genre: Country
- Length: 37:02
- Label: Big Loud
- Producer: Joey Moi

Ernest chronology
Locals Only (2019)	Flower Shops (The Album) (2022)	Nashville, Tennessee (2024)

Singles from Flower Shops (The Album)
- 1. "Flower Shops" Released: December 31, 2021

Flower Shops (The Album) is the second studio album by American country music singer Ernest. It was released on March 11, 2022, via Big Loud. The album contains the single "Flower Shops", a duet with Morgan Wallen.

== Content ==
Ernest had written several songs for other artists, typically under his full name of Ernest K. Smith, prior to signing to Big Loud as a recording artist. Flower Shops (The Album) is his second release for the label, following Locals Only in 2019. He released his single "Flower Shops", a duet with Morgan Wallen, in late 2021. Big Loud announced the album's release date in early 2022, at which point they had also previewed the songs "Some Other Bar", "Feet Wanna Run", and "What It's Come To". To promote the album, Ernest performed at Nashville, Tennessee's Exit/In club in March 2022.

== Track listing ==
Flower Shops (The Album) track listing
No.	Title	Writer(s)	Length
1.	"Sucker for Small Towns"	Ernest Keith Smith; Jacob Durrett; Ashley Gorley	3:22
2.	"Tennessee Queen"	Smith; Dan Isbell; Jordan Schmidt	3:11
3.	"Classic"	Smith; Durrett	3:07
4.	"Feet Wanna Run"	Smith; Chris LaCorte; Brad Warren; Brett Warren	3:03
5.	"Comfortable When I'm Crazy"	Smith; Rodney Clawson	4:00
6.	"Flower Shops" (featuring Morgan Wallen)	Smith; Ben Burgess; Mark Holman	3:34
7.	"Did It with You"	Smith; Clawson; Nathan Spicer	3:21
8.	"What It's Come To"	Smith; Lily Rose; Ryan Vojtesak	3:22
9.	"If You Were Whiskey"	Smith; Michael Carter; Ben Hayslip	3:15
10.	"Some Other Bar"	Smith; Gorley; Vojtesak	3:19
11.	"Flower Shops" (Acoustic Version) (featuring Morgan Wallen)	Smith; Burgess; Holman	3:28
Total length:			37:02

Flower Shops (The Album): Two Dozen Roses track listing
No.	Title	Writer(s)	Length
12.	"This Fire"	Smith; John Ryan; Julian Bunetta; Rocky Block	3:02
13.	"Wild Wild West"	Smith; Durrett; Rafe Tenpenny	3:30
14.	"Hill"	Smith; Brett Tyler; Schmidt	3:04
15.	"Burn Out"	Smith; Andy Albert; Hunter Phelps; Jordan Dozzi	3:12
16.	"Nothin to Lose"	Smith; Josh Osborne; Holman	3:19
17.	"Songs We Used to Sing"	Smith; Charles Kelley; Justin Ebach	3:05
18.	"Done at a Bar"	Smith; Josh Thompson	3:36
19.	"Drunk with My Friends"	Smith; Schmidt; Thompson	2:55
20.	"Anything but Sober"	Smith; Alysa Vanderheym	3:51
21.	"What Have I Got to Lose" (featuring Dean Dillon)	Smith; Brian Kelley; Dillon	3:27
22.	"Heartache in My 100 Proof" (featuring Jake Worthington)	Smith; Schmidt; Thompson	4:17
23.	"Unhang the Moon"	Smith; Brad Clawson; Grady Block; Durrett	3:30
24.	"Miss That Girl"	Smith; Clawson; Durrett	2:17
Total length:			80:07

== Charts ==
Weekly chart performance for Flower Shops (The Album)
Chart (2022)	Peak position
US Billboard 200	150
US Top Country Albums (Billboard)	12
