= Dangerous: The Double Album =

Studio album by Morgan Wallen
- Released: January 8, 2021
- Recorded: 2018–2020
- Studios: Blackbird Studio D (Nashville); Starstruck (Nashville); Ocean Way Studio A (Nashville); Sound Stage Back Stage (Nashville)
- Genres: Country; country pop
- Length: 96:53
- Labels: Big Loud; Republic
- Producer: Joey Moi

Morgan Wallen chronology
| If I Know Me (2018) | Dangerous: The Double Album (2021) | One Thing at a Time (2023) |

Singles from Dangerous: The Double Album
- 1. "More Than My Hometown" Released: May 27, 2020; 2. "7 Summers" Released: August 14, 2020; 3. "Sand in My Boots" Released: August 23, 2021; 4. "Wasted on You" Released: March 7, 2022

Dangerous: The Double Album is the second studio album by American country music singer Morgan Wallen. It was released as a double album on January 8, 2021, serving as the long awaited follow-up to his debut studio album If I Know Me (2018). Dangerous: The Double Album was released through Big Loud and Republic Records via CD, vinyl, and digital download. The album was produced by Joey Moi, with Jacob Durrett, Charlie Handsome, Matt Dragstrem and Dave Cohen co-producing select tracks. Ben Burgess and Chris Stapleton make guest appearances on the tracks "Outlaw" and "Only Thing That's Gone", respectively.

Prior to release, Dangerous spawned two singles: "More Than My Hometown", and "7 Summers"; and six promotional singles: "Cover Me Up", "This Bar", "Heartless (Wallen Album Mix)", "Somebody's Problem", "Still Goin' Down", and "Livin' the Dream". Postdating the release of Dangerous, two tracks from the album were additionally released as singles: "Sand in My Boots", and "Wasted on You". The latter and "7 Summers" charted within the top-ten of the US Billboard Hot 100, earning Wallen his first two top-ten hits on the respective chart. Dangerous consists of 30 tracks (Note: 33 tracks are present on the bonus edition of the album, being "This Side of a Dust Cloud", "Bandaid on a Bullet Hole", and "Sand in My Boots" (from The Dangerous Sessions).) and has a total running time over 96 minutes and is divided into three sections. (Note: Despite being titled Dangerous: The Double Album, the album is technically divided into three parts. The album has Side A and Side B, while the bonus edition features Side C. Side C consists of "This Side of a Dust Cloud", "Bandaid on a Bullet Hole", and "Sand in My Boots" (from The Dangerous Sessions).)

The album would receive positive reviews from music critics and is often considered Wallen's best album. It debuted at number one on the US Billboard 200 and US Top Country Albums charts, earning 265,000 album-equivalent units in its first week. In March 2022, the album established the all-time record for longest duration in the number one spot (97 weeks) on Billboard's Country Albums chart. In December 2022, the album became the first album ever by a solo artist to spend 100 weeks inside the top-ten of the Billboard 200. As of July 2025, the album has spent 165 weeks inside the top-ten of the Billboard 200, the second most weeks spent in the charts uppermost region in history. The album was ranked top album of the 21st century by Billboard and certified 9× Platinum by RIAA.

== Background ==
Wallen stated:

"The 'double album' idea started off as just a joke between me and my manager because we had accumulated so many songs over the past couple of years. Then quarantine hit, and we realized it might actually be possible to have enough time to make it happen. I also ended up writing quite a few more songs during the quarantine with some of my good buddies. I also wanted the songs to speak to multiple phases of life and have multiple different sounds based on my influences and based on what I enjoy".

Shortly before the release of the album, several CDs were erroneously put up for sale at certain Walmart locations in the United States. This prompted several consumers to leak clips of unreleased songs, to which Wallen responded by saying "If anyone's gonna leak my music, it should be me" and releasing "leaks" of unreleased songs himself. He also urged his fans to buy the physical release at Target instead, adding: "I don't shop at Walmart anyway. I also gave Target two extra songs, so if you're going to buy my album physically, go to Target, baby".

Walmart responded to the issue with this statement provided to the Rolling Stone:

"We are deeply apologetic to Morgan for this unfortunate situation. We appreciate Morgan as an artist and understand his frustration and disappointment. We have protocols in place to help ensure new albums are not sold before the release date, yet in this instance his album made its way to the shelf in a handful of stores early. We're actively removing any albums remaining on the shelves in those stores to hold until the official release date, and taking additional precautionary measures for the future".

== Critical reception ==
Professional ratings
Aggregate scores
| Source | Rating |
|---|---|
| Metacritic | 72/100 |
Review scores
| Source | Rating |
| AllMusic | 4/5 stars |
| Pitchfork | 6.9/10 |
| Rolling Stone | 3/5 stars |

The album received generally positive reviews. Owen Myers of Pitchfork complimented Wallen's vocals and songwriting alongside writing that "among the album's 30 tracks there are few skips". Jonathan Bernstein of Rolling Stone felt the opposite, calling the record "part album, part playlist, part content dump" and that "Wallen does not always seem up to the heavy task of pumping fresh life into well-worn topics". Writing for Stereogum, Chris DeVille wrote that though "Wallen's look is old-fashioned, his sound is thoroughly, sometimes maddeningly current" and called the record "a massive leap from his debut" while adding "if the tracklist feels excessive, it also doesn't have a lot of weak spots" and that "the guy seems capable of becoming Garth Brooks for a new generation". Jon Pareles of The New York Times wrote that Wallen "leaves ample room for musical variety" and called the record "modern Nashville studio product, aimed for radio playlists and, eventually, big concert spaces".

Chris Richards, writing for The Washington Post, opined that the album "feels about 19 songs too long" and that "time never seems to be moving fast enough [on it]". Dan DeLuca of The Philadelphia Inquirer wrote that the album "gets tiresome fast" and called it "overstuffed with radio-ready cliche", but did recognize Wallen's overall talent. Stephen Thomas Erlewine of AllMusic wrote that "the sheer variety proves Wallen can indeed convincingly sing just about any modern country style" and felt that the album weaved between "harder country and softer pop".

== Commercial performance ==
Dangerous: The Double Album debuted at number one on the US Billboard 200 and US Top Country Albums charts, earning 265,000 album-equivalent units (including 74,000 copies as pure album sales) in its first week, according to MRC Data. This became Wallen's first US number one debut and his second on the latter. The album also accumulated a total of 240.18 million on-demand streams, becoming the largest streaming week ever for a country album at the time. This more than doubles the record set by Luke Combs' What You See Is What You Get. In its second week, the album remained at number one on the chart, earning an additional 159,000 units making it the first country album to spend two weeks at number one since Chris Stapleton's Traveller in 2015 and the first country set to spend its first two weeks at number one since Luke Bryan's 2015 album Kill the Lights.

In its third week on the Billboard 200, the album remained at number one on the chart, earning 130,000 more units. In its fourth week, the album remained at number one on the chart, earning 149,000 units. It received a 14 percent increase from the previous week, despite the nationwide removal of Wallen's music throughout radio stations in the United States following his use of a racial slur outside of his Nashville home on February 2, 2021. It concurrently became the first country album to spend its first four weeks atop the Billboard 200 chart since Shania Twain's Up! did so in January 2003. In addition, it later extended its run with a fifth and sixth week at the top, marking the longest run atop the charts for a country album since Garth Brooks' The Chase in 1992.

The album eventually spent a total of ten weeks at number one on the Billboard 200 and ended up becoming the best selling album for the first half of 2021. As of September 2021, the album had earned 2,539,000 album-equivalent units and has sold 267,000 copies in the United States. Eventually, it earned over 4.1 million of album-equivalent units and was ranked as the most popular album in the United States of 2021. In 2022, the album earned over 2,405,000 album-equivalent units and was ranked as the third most popular album of the year by Luminate year-end report. In 2023, Dangerous: The Double Album was ranked as the fifth most popular album in the United States with 2,179,000 album-equivalent units.

In January 2025, the album was ranked top album of the 21st century. It ranked among the year's top 10 most popular albums in 2021–24, (No. 1), 2022 (No. 3), 2023 (No. 5) and 2024 (No. 8), marking the first album to spend four years, consecutively or otherwise, in the year-end top 10 since the original Broadway cast recording to My Fair Lady (1956–59). The album has been certified 9× Platinum in the United States, 4× Platinum in Canada, Platinum in Australia, and Gold in New Zealand.

== Track listing ==
Disc one
| No. | Title | Writer(s) | Length |
|---|---|---|---|
| 1. | "Sand in My Boots" | Ashley Gorley; Michael Hardy; Josh Osborne | 3:22 |
| 2. | "Wasted on You" | Morgan Wallen; Ernest Keith Smith; Josh Thompson; Ryan Vojtesak | 2:58 |
| 3. | "Somebody's Problem" | Wallen; Rodney Clawson; Jacob Durrett; Smith | 2:41 |
| 4. | "More Surprised than Me" | Ben Burgess; Lee Thomas Miller; Niko Moon | 2:37 |
| 5. | "865" | John Byron; Blake Pendergrass | 3:10 |
| 6. | "Warning" | Gorley; Smith; Vojtesak | 2:36 |
| 7. | "Neon Eyes" | Wallen; Burgess; Mark Holman | 3:46 |
| 8. | "Outlaw" (featuring Ben Burgess) | Burgess; Patrick Davis; Josh Kerr; Jordan Reynolds | 3:49 |
| 9. | "Whiskey'd My Way" | Matt Dragstrem; Josh Miller; Thomas Rhett; Thompson | 3:00 |
| 10. | "Wonderin' 'bout the Wind" | Wallen; Smith | 3:02 |
| 11. | "Your Bartender" | Rhett Akins; Dragstrem; Rhett; Thompson | 3:05 |
| 12. | "Only Thing That's Gone" (featuring Chris Stapleton) | Wallen; Dragstrem; Chase McGill; Thompson | 3:16 |
| 13. | "Cover Me Up" | Jason Isbell | 4:53 |
| 14. | "7 Summers" | Wallen; Shane McAnally; Osborne | 3:30 |
| 15. | "More Than My Hometown" | Wallen; Hardy; Smith; Vojtesak | 3:36 |
| Total length: | | | 49:21 |

Disc two
| No. | Title | Writer(s) | Length |
|---|---|---|---|
| 1. | "Still Goin' Down" | Wallen; Hardy; Vojtesak | 3:06 |
| 2. | "Rednecks, Red Letters, Red Dirt" | Dragstrem; McGill; Thompson | 3:05 |
| 3. | "Dangerous" | Wallen; Smith | 2:27 |
| 4. | "Beer Don't" | Wallen; Hardy; Jake Mitchell | 3:16 |
| 5. | "Blame It on Me" | Gorley; Smith; Vojtesak | 2:42 |
| 6. | "Somethin' Country" | Wallen; Hardy; Daniel Ross; Smith | 2:52 |
| 7. | "This Bar" | Wallen; Hardy; Jackson Morgan; Jake Scott; Smith; Vojtesak | 3:05 |
| 8. | "Country Ass Shit" | Wallen; McGill; Jordan Schmidt | 3:06 |
| 9. | "Whatcha Think of Country Now" | Dallas Davidson; Devin Dawson; Kyle Fishman; Holman; Justin Wilson | 3:02 |
| 10. | "Me on Whiskey" | Clawson; Holman; Smith | 3:30 |
| 11. | "Need a Boat" | Wallen; Dragstrem; Hillary Lindsey | 3:05 |
| 12. | "Silverado for Sale" | Davidson; Marv Green; Ben Hayslip | 3:44 |
| 13. | "Heartless" (Wallen Album Mix) | Wallen; Henry Agincourt Allen; Ryan Hurd; Thomas Wesley Pentz; Smith; Vojtesak | 2:49 |
| 14. | "Livin' the Dream" | Wallen; Burgess; Durrett; Hardy | 3:59 |
| 15. | "Quittin' Time" | Eric Church; Luke Laird; Thompson | 3:44 |
| Total length: | | | 47:32 |

Bonus and Target edition tracks
| No. | Title | Writer(s) | Length |
|---|---|---|---|
| 16. | "This Side of a Dust Cloud" | Wallen; Dragstrem; McGill; Thompson | 3:20 |
| 17. | "Bandaid on a Bullet Hole" | Wallen; Durrett; Gorley | 3:54 |

Bonus edition
| No. | Title | Writer(s) | Length |
|---|---|---|---|
| 18. | "Sand in My Boots" (The Dangerous Sessions) | Gorley; Hardy; Osborne | 3:17 |

=== Notes ===
- "Country Ass Shit" is stylized as "Country A$$ Shit".

== Personnel ==
Adapted from the album liner notes.

=== Musicians ===
- Tom Bukovac – electric guitar
- Ben Burgess – duet vocals on "Outlaw"
- Dave Cohen – Hammond B-3 organ, keyboards
- Matt Dragstrem – programming
- Jacob Durrett – programming
- Paul Franklin – steel guitar
- Charlie Handsome – programming
- Wes Hightower – background vocals
- Mark Holman – programming
- Jake Mitchell – programming
- Joey Moi – electric guitar, programming, background vocals
- Niko Moon – programming
- Jerry Roe – drums, percussion
- Daniel Ross – programming
- Ernest Keith Smith – background vocals
- Jimmie Lee Sloas – bass guitar
- Chris Stapleton – duet vocals on "Only Thing That's Gone"
- Bryan Sutton – acoustic guitar, banjo, Dobro, mandolin
- Ilya Toshinskiy – acoustic guitar
- Morgan Wallen – lead vocals, background vocals
- Derek Wells – accordion, electric guitar

=== Technical ===
- Sean Badum – room assistance
- Jeff Balding – recording
- Scott Cooke – editing
- Charlie Handsome – co-production on "Warning"
- Dave Cohen – co-production on "Cover Me Up"
- Josh Ditty – recording assistance
- Matt Dragstrem – co-production on "Your Bartender"
- Jacob Durrett – co-production on "Wasted on You" and "Bandaid on a Bullet Hole"
- Ally Gecewicz – studio assistance, editing
- Ted Jensen – mastering on "7 Summers"
- John Mayfield – mastering on "Cover Me Up"
- Andrew Mendelson – mastering on all tracks except "Cover Me Up" and "7 Summers"
- Joey Moi – production, mixing
- Eivind Nordland – editing, mixing on "This Side of a Dust Cloud"
- Ryan Yount – recording assistance

=== Artwork ===
- Morgan Wallen – art direction
- Tori Johnson – art direction, graphic design
- Ryan Smith – album photography
- Caleb Donato – additional photography
- Ashlyne Wallen – additional photography
- Lauren McCoy – additional photography
- Camille Kenny – illustration

== Charts ==
=== Weekly charts ===
Weekly chart performance for Dangerous: The Double Album
| Chart (2021–2025) | Peak position |
|---|---|
| Australian Albums (ARIA) | 2 |
| Canadian Albums (Billboard) | 1 |
| Irish Albums (Official Charts) | 33 |
| New Zealand Albums (RMNZ) | 27 |
| Scottish Albums (Official Charts) | 60 |
| UK Albums (Official Charts) | 77 |
| US Billboard 200 | 1 |
| US Top Country Albums (Billboard) | 1 |

=== Year-end charts ===
2021 year-end chart performance for Dangerous: The Double Album
| Chart (2021) | Position |
|---|---|
| Australian Albums (ARIA) | 23 |
| Canadian Albums (Billboard) | 1 |
| US Billboard 200 | 1 |
| US Top Country Albums (Billboard) | 1 |

2022 year-end chart performance for Dangerous: The Double Album
| Chart (2022) | Position |
|---|---|
| Australian Albums (ARIA) | 38 |
| Canadian Albums (Billboard) | 4 |
| US Billboard 200 | 3 |
| US Top Country Albums (Billboard) | 1 |

2023 year-end chart performance for Dangerous: The Double Album
| Chart (2023) | Position |
|---|---|
| Australian Albums (ARIA) | 30 |
| Canadian Albums (Billboard) | 5 |
| US Billboard 200 | 5 |
| US Top Country Albums (Billboard) | 2 |

2024 year-end chart performance for Dangerous: The Double Album
| Chart (2024) | Position |
|---|---|
| Australian Albums (ARIA) | 38 |
| Australian Country Albums (ARIA) | 6 |
| Canadian Albums (Billboard) | 8 |
| US Billboard 200 | 8 |
| US Top Country Albums (Billboard) | 3 |

2025 year-end chart performance for Dangerous: The Double Album
| Chart (2025) | Position |
|---|---|
| Australian Albums (ARIA) | 73 |
| Canadian Albums (Billboard) | 20 |
| US Billboard 200 | 14 |
| US Top Country Albums (Billboard) | 3 |

== Certifications ==
Certifications for Dangerous: The Double Album
| Region | Certification | Certified units/sales |
|---|---|---|
| Australia (ARIA) | Platinum | 70,000^{‡} |
| Canada (Music Canada) | 4× Platinum | 320,000^{‡} |
| New Zealand (RMNZ) | Gold | 7,500^{‡} |
| United Kingdom (BPI) | Silver | 60,000^{‡} |
| United States (RIAA) | 9× Platinum | 9,000,000^{‡} |
^{‡} Sales+streaming figures based on certification alone.

== Release history ==
Release formats for Dangerous: The Double Album
| Country | Date | Format | Label | Ref. |
|---|---|---|---|---|
| Canada | January 8, 2021 | CD; LP; digital download; streaming | Big Loud; Republic; Universal Canada | |
| Various | January 8, 2021 | CD; LP; digital download; streaming | Big Loud; Republic | |
