= Hometown News =

American country music duo

- Origin: Nashville, Tennessee, United States
- Genres: Country
- Years active: 2002-2006
- Labels: VFR; Quarterback
- Past members: Ron Kingery; Scott Whitehead

Hometown News was an American country music duo from Nashville, Tennessee. The duo consisted of singer-songwriters Ron Kingery and Scott Whitehead, both of whom were vocalists and guitarists. Hometown News recorded two independently released albums, in addition to charting two singles on the Billboard country music charts. Their highest-peaking single, "Minivan", reached No. 37 in 2002.

== History ==
Before the duo's formation, Ron Kingery worked as a studio engineer for various country music artists in Nashville, Tennessee, in addition to writing children's music. Scott Whitehead, a graduate of the University of Tennessee at Martin and formerly a pilot for the United States Navy, was also working a songwriter in Nashville, when he met Kingery at a songwriter's workshop in 1996. In addition, the duo appeared on the Grand Ole Opry, as well as playing gigs at several military bases.

== Recording career ==
The duo were then signed to VFR Records in 2002, recording their album Wheels that year. The album produced two singles in its title track and "Minivan", the latter a Top 40 hit. Shortly afterward, the duo embarked on a tour of the United States, sponsored by the Ford Motor Company. VFR closed in 2002, and the duo was left without a record deal.

In 2005, Hometown News signed to the independent Quarterback Records label. Their second album, Hometown News, was released in 2006, although it did not produce any chart singles.

Whitehead died on March 12, 2021, of unknown causes.

== Discography ==
=== Studio albums ===
Title	Album details
Wheels	Release date: June 4, 2002; Label: VFR Records; Formats: CD
Hometown News	Release date: September 20, 2005; Label: Quarterback Records; Formats: CD, music download

=== Singles ===
Year	Single	Peak positions	Album
Year	Single	US Country	Album
2002	"Minivan"	37	Wheels
2002	"Wheels"	47	Wheels
2003	"First Second Chance"	—	Wheels
2004	"Revitalize"	—	Wheels
2004	"If I Could"	—	Hometown News
2005	"That's Country to Me"	—	Hometown News
2006	"Brand New Me"	—	Hometown News
2006	"God Bless the Children" (with Wayne Warner and the Nashville All-Star Choir)	—	Turbo Twang'n
"—" denotes releases that did not chart

=== Music videos ===
Year	Video	Director
2004	"Revitalize"	
2004	"If I Could"	
