= Still Goin' Down =

2020 song by Morgan Wallen

Promotional single by Morgan Wallen

from the album Dangerous: The Double Album
- Released: November 20, 2020
- Genre: Country
- Length: 3:06
- Label: Big Loud; Republic
- Songwriters: Michael Hardy; Morgan Wallen; Ryan Vojtesak
- Producer: Joey Moi

Lyric video
- "Still Goin' Down" on YouTube

"Still Goin' Down" is a song recorded by American country music singer Morgan Wallen. It was released on November 20, 2020 from his second studio album Dangerous: The Double Album. The song was co-wrote by Wallen, Michael Hardy and Ryan Vojtesak, and produced by Joey Moi.

== Content ==
"Still Goin' Down" is an anthem that pays tribute to all the small town Friday nights and beer drinkin' around the bonfire. Wallen described the song is all about growing up in the country, it truly is a love song to the town that raised him.

== Charts ==
=== Weekly charts ===
Weekly chart performance for "Still Goin' Down"
Chart (2020–2021)	Peak position
Canada Hot 100 (Billboard)	38
Global 200 (Billboard)	60
New Zealand Hot Singles (RMNZ)	33
US Billboard Hot 100	45
US Hot Country Songs (Billboard)	8

=== Year-end charts ===
Year-end chart performance for "Still Goin' Down"
Chart (2021)	Position
US Hot Country Songs (Billboard)	62

== Certifications ==
Region	Certification	Certified units/sales
Australia (ARIA)	Gold	35,000^{‡}
Canada (Music Canada)	Platinum	80,000^{‡}
United States (RIAA)	3× Platinum	3,000,000^{‡}
^{‡} Sales+streaming figures based on certification alone.
