= Sand in My Boots =

2021 single by Morgan Wallen

Single by Morgan Wallen

from the album Dangerous: The Double Album
- Released: August 23, 2021
- Genre: Country
- Length: 3:22
- Label: Big Loud
- Songwriters: Michael Hardy; Josh Osborne; Ashley Gorley
- Producer: Joey Moi

Morgan Wallen singles chronology
"7 Summers" (2020)	"Sand in My Boots" (2021)	"Broadway Girls" (2021)

Lyric video
- "Sand in My Boots" on YouTube

"Sand in My Boots" is a song recorded by American country music singer Morgan Wallen. It was released to country radio on August 23, 2021, as the third single from his second studio album Dangerous: The Double Album.

== Content ==
The song was written by Ashley Gorley, Michael Hardy and Josh Osborne. "Sand in My Boots" is a nostalgic ballad about a lost love, describes a worn out cowboy, weathering lost love and fading memories of drinking with that girl who could've been the one.

== Critical reception ==
Billy Duke of website Taste of Country commented "Sand in My Boots" is the best songwriting on the album.

== Commercial performance ==
The song began receiving airplay on country radio in July 2021. It debuted on Country Airplay at number 56 with 699,000 audience impressions in the week ending July 4, and reached number one dated February 26, 2022, becoming Wallen's fifth number one single on that chart.

== Charts ==
=== Weekly charts ===
Weekly chart performance for "Sand in My Boots"
Chart (2021–2022)	Peak position
Canada Hot 100 (Billboard)	31
Canada Country (Billboard)	1
Global 200 (Billboard)	47
New Zealand Hot Singles (RMNZ)	32
US Billboard Hot 100	30
US Country Airplay (Billboard)	1
US Hot Country Songs (Billboard)	2

=== Year-end charts ===
2021 year-end chart performance for "Sand in My Boots"
Chart (2021)	Position
US Hot Country Songs (Billboard)	15

2022 year-end chart performance for "Sand in My Boots"
Chart (2022)	Position
US Billboard Hot 100	58
US Country Airplay (Billboard)	14
US Hot Country Songs (Billboard)	31

== Certifications ==
Certifications for "Sand in My Boots"
Region	Certification	Certified units/sales
Australia (ARIA)	Platinum	70,000^{‡}
Canada (Music Canada)	3× Platinum	240,000^{‡}
New Zealand (RMNZ)	Platinum	30,000^{‡}
United States (RIAA)	5× Platinum	5,000,000^{‡}
^{‡} Sales+streaming figures based on certification alone.

== Release history ==
Release history for "Sand in My Boots"
Region	Date	Format	Label	Ref.
Various	January 8, 2021	Digital download; streaming	Big Loud	
United States	August 23, 2021	Country radio	Big Loud	
