= Jan Vyčítal =

Czech musician (1942–2020)

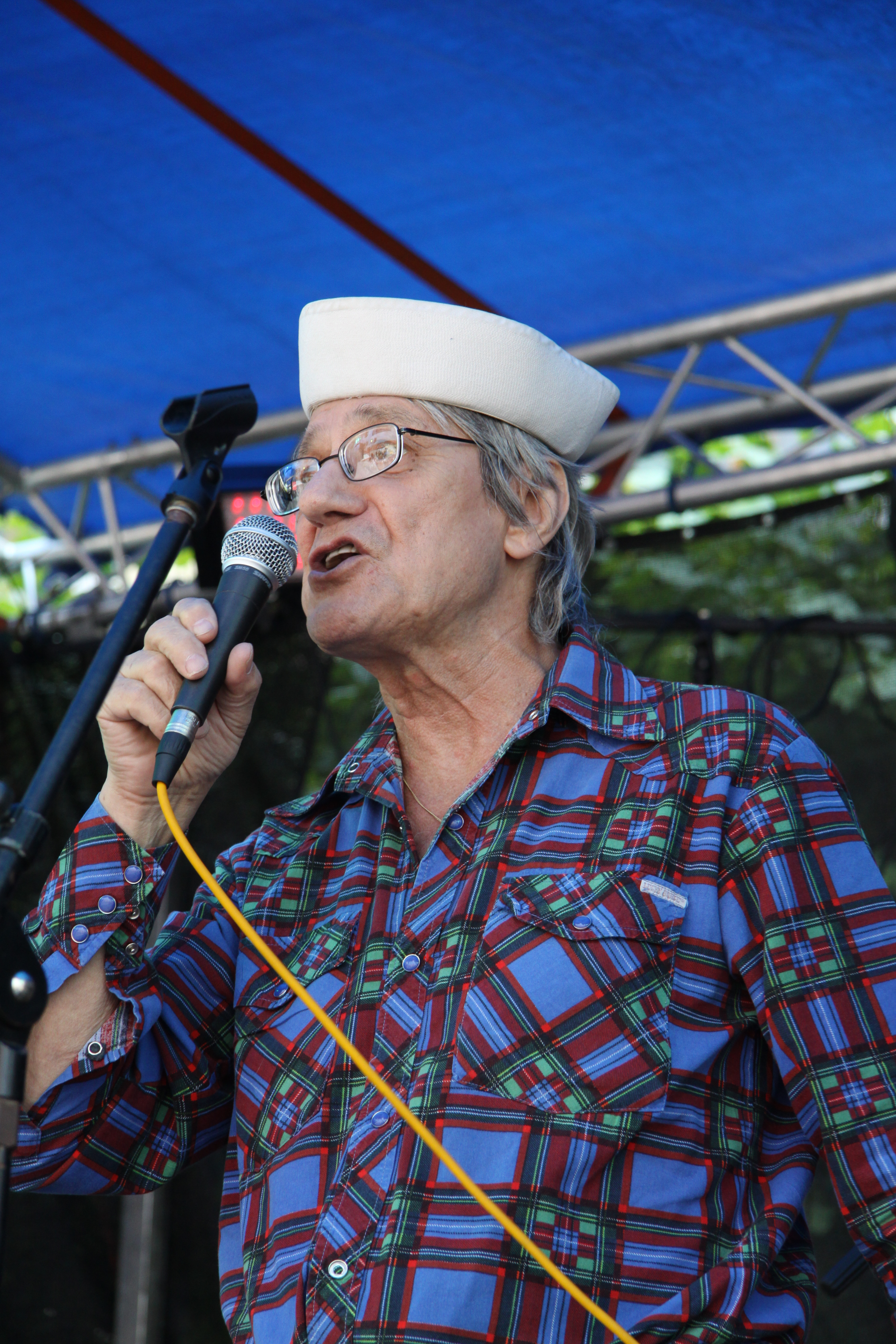
- Vyčítal in 2011

Background information
- Born: 8 March 1942; Prague, Protectorate of Bohemia and Moravia
- Died: 1 March 2020 (aged 77)
- Genre: country music
- Occupations: singer, songwriter, caricaturist
- Instruments: guitar
- Years active: 1965–2020
- Labels: Venkow Records, Supraphon Panton Records

Jan Vyčítal (8 March 1942 – 1 March 2020) was a Czech country music singer and songwriter. He was founding member of Greenhorns. He also drew the cover art for many albums.

== Biography ==
Vyčítal was born in Prague, Protectorate of Bohemia and Moravia. He died on 1 March 2020, at the age of 77.

== Selected discography ==
- 1990 Semtex
- 1992 Když sme opustili Prahu
- 1993 Pivní džip
- 1995 Modlitba za Wimpyho a Wabiho
- 1997 Zvířecí farma
- 1997 Nejhezčí písničky Honzy Vyčítala (jen vzpomínky poštmistrovic kluka...)
- 1999 Master serie
- 1999 V baru Zlatá Praha
- 2000 60 – Honza Vyčítal a Greenhorns
- 2003 Honza Vyčítal a Greenhorns – Dalas!
- 2006 T jako textař
- 2007 To tenkrát v druhý světový...
- 2007 Vracecí kocour
