= Warning (Morgan Wallen song) =

2021 song by Morgan Wallen

Song by Morgan Wallen

from the album Dangerous: The Double Album
- Released: January 8, 2021
- Genre: Country
- Length: 2:36
- Label: Big Loud; Republic
- Songwriters: Ashley Gorley; Ernest Keith Smith; Ryan Vojtesak
- Producer: Joey Moi

Lyric video
- "Warning" on YouTube

"Warning" is a song recorded by American country music singer Morgan Wallen. It was from his second studio album Dangerous: The Double Album. The song was co-wrote by Ashley Gorley, Ernest Keith Smith and Ryan Vojtesak, and produced by Joey Moi.

== Background ==
Wallen first teased "Warning" on May 1, 2020, with an Instagram post that featured an acoustic performance of just him and his guitar singing about how various things throughout his night "shoulda come with a warning" to prevent him from further heartbreak, and asked his fans if it should be on his second album.

== Charts ==
=== Weekly charts ===
Weekly chart performance for "Warning"
Chart (2021)	Peak position
Canada Hot 100 (Billboard)	43
Global 200 (Billboard)	65
US Billboard Hot 100	42
US Hot Country Songs (Billboard)	10

=== Year-end charts ===
Year-end chart performance for "Warning"
Chart (2021)	Position
US Hot Country Songs (Billboard)	75

== Certifications ==
Region	Certification	Certified units/sales
Australia (ARIA)	Gold	35,000^{‡}
Canada (Music Canada)	Platinum	80,000^{‡}
United States (RIAA)	2× Platinum	2,000,000^{‡}
^{‡} Sales+streaming figures based on certification alone.
