= Somebody's Problem =

2020 song by Morgan Wallen

Promotional single by Morgan Wallen

from the album Dangerous: The Double Album
- Released: November 20, 2020
- Genre: Country
- Length: 2:41
- Label: Big Loud; Republic
- Songwriters: Ernest Keith Smith; Jacob Durrett; Morgan Wallen; Rodney Clawson
- Producer: Joey Moi

Lyric video
- "Somebody's Problem" on YouTube

"Somebody's Problem" is a song recorded by American country music singer Morgan Wallen. It was released on November 20, 2020, from his second studio album Dangerous: The Double Album. The song was co-written by Wallen, Ernest Keith Smith, Jacob Durrett and Rodney Clawson, and produced by Joey Moi.

== Background ==
"Somebody's Problem" started with Wallen spotting a Southern woman. He said the woman is the "Kinda girl once she steps out, the world stands still." He is smitten, but he thinks she might have been mistreated in the past: "She's somebody's problem, somebody's goodbye / Somebody's last call number that they can't find". He later finds out her name is Heather Daniel & she is from Heflin, Louisiana.

== Content ==
"Somebody's Problem" is a narrative that is all about a budding new relationship, with the start of one relationship, another one ends. In lyrics, Wallen thinks how a woman who is too good to be true could have slipped through an ex's fingers and guesses she is somebody's problem or goodbye, best day or worst night.

== Charts ==
=== Weekly charts ===
Weekly chart performance for "Somebody's Problem"
Chart (2020–2021)	Peak position
Canada Hot 100 (Billboard)	19
Global 200 (Billboard)	39
New Zealand Hot Singles (RMNZ)	18
US Billboard Hot 100	25
US Hot Country Songs (Billboard)	3

=== Year-end charts ===
Year-end chart performance for "Somebody's Problem"
Chart (2021)	Position
US Hot Country Songs (Billboard)	42

== Certifications ==
Region	Certification	Certified units/sales
Australia (ARIA)	Platinum	70,000^{‡}
Canada (Music Canada)	2× Platinum	160,000^{‡}
New Zealand (RMNZ)	Gold	15,000^{‡}
United States (RIAA)	4× Platinum	4,000,000^{‡}
^{‡} Sales+streaming figures based on certification alone.
