= Livin' the Dream (Morgan Wallen song) =

2020 song by Morgan Wallen

Promotional single by Morgan Wallen

from the album Dangerous: The Double Album
- Released: November 20, 2020
- Genre: Country
- Length: 3:59
- Label: Big Loud; Republic
- Songwriters: Michael Hardy; Morgan Wallen; Ben Burgess; Jacob Durrett
- Producer: Joey Moi

Lyric video
- "Livin' the Dream" on YouTube

"Livin' the Dream" is a song recorded by American country music singer Morgan Wallen. It was released on November 20, 2020, from his second studio album Dangerous: The Double Album. The song was co-wrote by Wallen, Michael Hardy, Ben Burgess and Jacob Durrett, and produced by Joey Moi.

== Content ==
"Livin' the Dream" is a song about Wallen's "wild lifestyle" as a musician. Its lyrics tell his story of the difficulties that one faces as a famous musician. Wallen said "Livin' the Dream" is "one of, if not the most personal songs on my new record".

== Critical reception ==
Reporter Rachel Rutherford said: "It gave everyone a whole new perspective for having fame and a new respect for famous people".

== Charts ==
=== Weekly charts ===
Weekly chart performance for "Livin' the Dream"
Chart (2020–2021)	Peak position
Canada Hot 100 (Billboard)	58
Global 200 (Billboard)	166
US Billboard Hot 100	74
US Hot Country Songs (Billboard)	19

=== Year-end charts ===
Year-end chart performance for "Livin' the Dream"
Chart (2021)	Position
US Hot Country Songs (Billboard)	83

== Certifications ==
Region	Certification	Certified units/sales
Australia (ARIA)	Gold	35,000^{‡}
Canada (Music Canada)	Platinum	80,000^{‡}
United States (RIAA)	2× Platinum	2,000,000^{‡}
^{‡} Sales+streaming figures based on certification alone.
