= 7 Summers =

2020 single by Morgan Wallen

Single by Morgan Wallen

from the album Dangerous: The Double Album
- Released: August 14, 2020
- Recorded: 2020
- Genre: Country; pop rock; soft rock
- Length: 3:30
- Label: Big Loud; Republic
- Songwriters: Josh Osborne; Shane McAnally; Morgan Wallen
- Producer: Joey Moi

Morgan Wallen singles chronology
"More Than My Hometown" (2020)	"7 Summers" (2020)	"Sand in My Boots" (2021)

Lyric video
- "7 Summers" on YouTube

Short film
- "7 Summers" on YouTube

"7 Summers" is a song by American country music singer Morgan Wallen from his second studio album, Dangerous: The Double Album (2021). Wallen wrote the song along with Shane McAnally and Josh Osborne, and it was produced by Joey Moi. Wallen did not originally intend to include the song on the album, but following a demo version of the song gaining popularity on social media, he decided on its inclusion. The song was officially released as the second single of the album on August 14, 2020. A country and soft rock track, it features suspended chords and guitar layering. Lyrically, Wallen sings of his lost love and reminisces about their romance that took place, as the title suggests, seven summers ago.

"7 Summers" received positive reviews from music critics, who praised Wallen's vocals, Moi's production, and its overall mood. Time would rank the song the seventh best of 2020. Upon its release, the song broke the single-day Apple Music streaming record for a country song. The song debuted at number one on Billboard's Hot Country Songs and number six on the Billboard Hot 100, making Wallen only the second solo male country artist to earn a Billboard top 10 debut, 21 years after Garth Brooks did so as Chris Gaines in 1999. It has since been certified 7× Platinum in the United States by the Recording Industry Association of America (RIAA). Wallen would release a short film for the song and would later perform it as part of his appearance on Saturday Night Live.

== Background ==
While at the beach with his children, songwriter Shane McAnally came up the idea of a song titled "7 Summers", as it was his seventh summer going to the beach with his family. He would pitch the title to Wallen who found the title to be interesting and would begin writing the song alongside McAnally and Josh Osborne, while bringing in Joey Moi to produce the song. During the COVID-19 quarantine, Wallen was nominated by fellow country musician Jake Owen to do a demo on Instagram; he accepted the challenge and performed what would become the song's first verse and chorus in April 2020. Wallen was initially uncertain whether the song would be included on his second album, however he changed his mind after the demo received positive feedback from fans and went viral on video-sharing app TikTok, earning over 24 million views prior to its official release. On August 4, in response to a fan who posted on TikTok that they were waiting for Wallen to release the song, he announced it would be released the following week. In a statement on the song's release, Wallen said:

"Social media played a huge part in me releasing this song, especially this early. It's a cool thing – me being on the fence about it, then being able to put it out and get people's feedback. Seeing the response played the biggest part in this release. I think that speaks to just how much fans mean to me and fans mean to music".

== Composition and lyrics ==
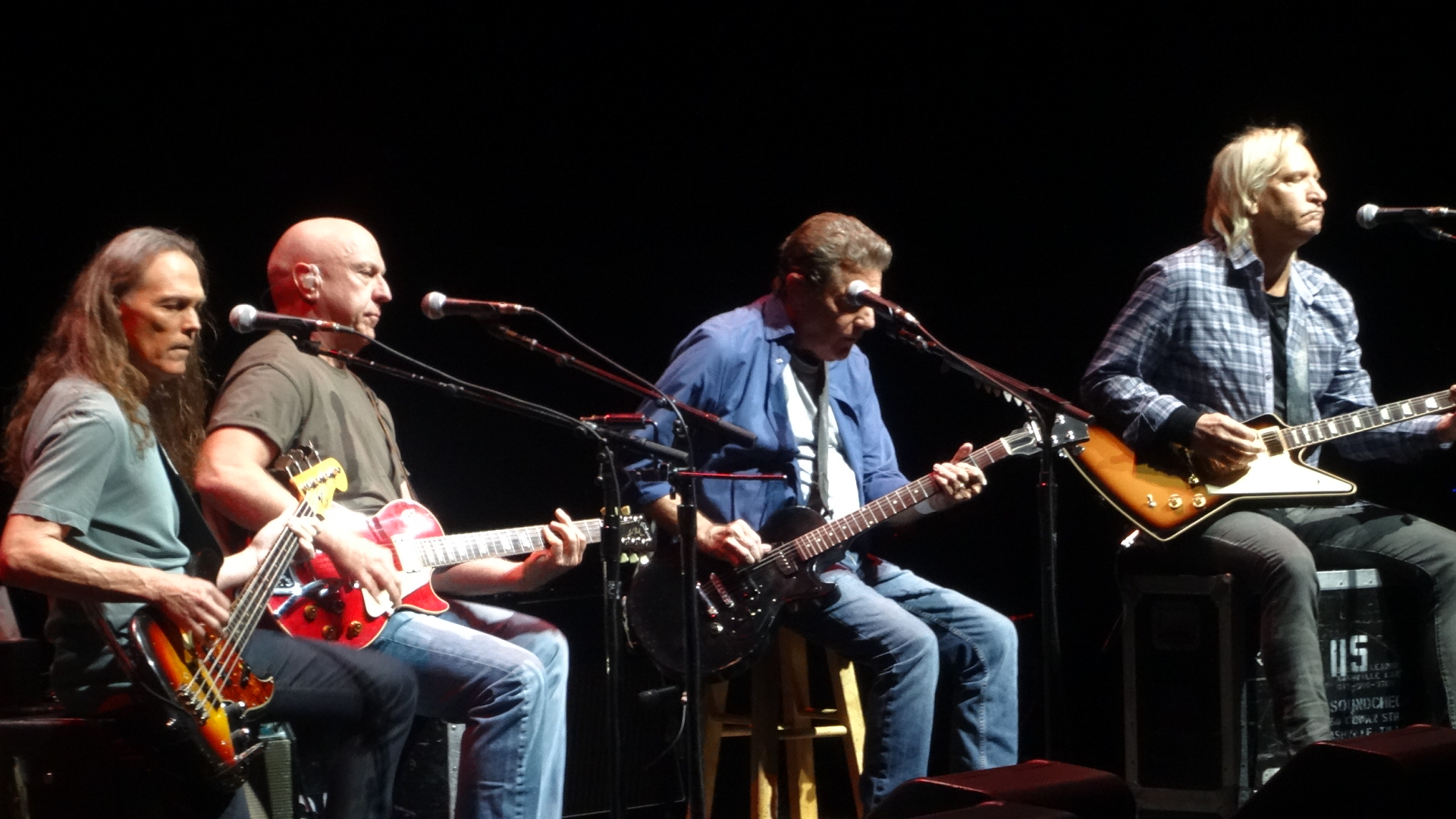
Wallen was inspired by soft rock bands such as the Eagles (pictured)

"7 Summers" has been described as a blend of 1980s style country music and soft rock, with Wallen stating that he was influenced by rock bands Fleetwood Mac and the Eagles, whom he grew up listening to with his father. While writing the song, song writer Shane McAnally sought to incorporate a wistfulness and bittersweet quality that would distinguish it from the more lighthearted songs that he typically wrote. Wallen would include experiences from his upbringing in the lyrics. The song contains ringing, suspended chords, and layered guitars meant to add a maximalist element, a "shimmering mid-tempo groove", and a "breezy, island-influenced" melody. Wallen's vocals are "nostalgic", "bittersweet", "wistful", and "daydreamy" as he reminisces on a lost summer romance that took place, as the title suggests, seven summers ago, while also pondering if his summer lover still thinks about "that boy from East Tennessee", referring to himself. His nostalgia takes him back to an unforgettable summer that is "all too vivid", with a "time traveling chorus" indicating a second chance with his former romance may be possible.

== Release and reception ==
The song was officially released on August 14, 2020, as the second single from Wallen's second studio album Dangerous: The Double Album. Upon its release, the song was met with positive reviews from music critics, who praised Wallen's vocals, Moi's production, and the overall mood of the song. Billboard's Melinda Newman gave the song overall praise, calling it reminiscent of the easy listening music of the mid-20th-century and stating: "Wallen's wistful vocals, Joey Moi's pitch-perfect production and the yearning for a time and love long gone pack a gentle wallop". Allie Clouse of the Knoxville News Sentinel deemed the song a "nostalgic summer soundtrack". Think Country Music's Jamie Gard declared it "the country soundtrack of the season", opining that the song would captivate listeners with its "irresistible sway". CountrySwag's Erica Zisman described the song as "having imagery like no other". Rolling Stone's Jon Freeman called the song "dreamy", complimenting Moi's "atmospheric" production, stating that it "perfectly fits the mood of Wallen's story". At the years end, Time ranked it the seventh best song of 2020.

Since its release, "7 Summers" has grown to be a fan favorite track and is frequently cited as being one of Wallen's best songs.

== Short film ==
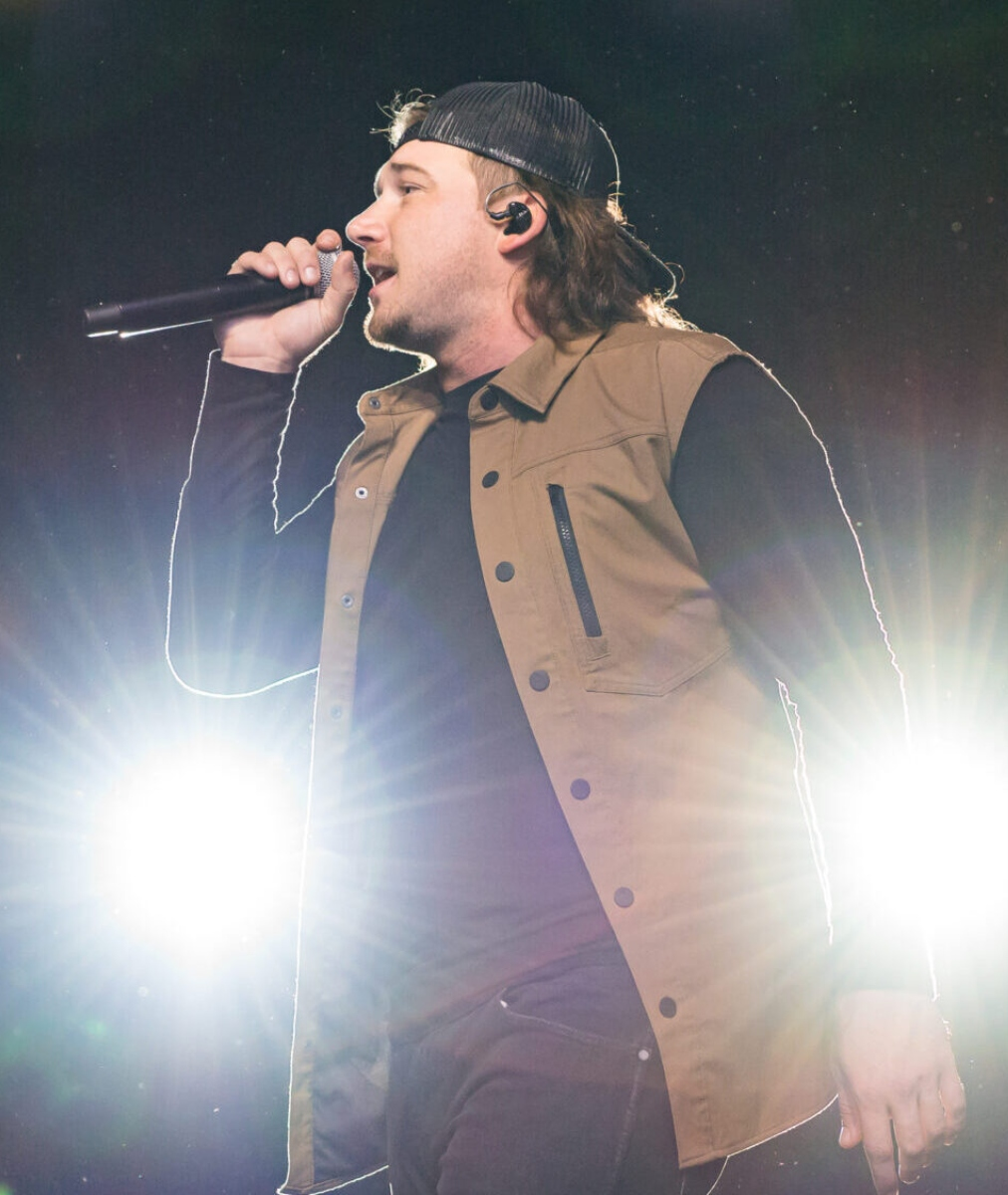
Wallen (pictured) would make his acting debut in a short film for the song.

On November 10, 2020, Wallen released an eight minute cinematic short film for the song directed by Justin Clough. Filmed in Nashville, the film features Wallen in his acting debut as a small town high school baseball star whose father pressures him to pursue a professional baseball career, while he fears that doing so might force him to leave behind his high school sweetheart. In the film, after failing to make the big leagues, Wallen returns to his hometown and discovers that his lost love has new life without him. The video was inspired by a period in Wallen's life in which he got injured playing baseball and struggled adjusting to community college, as well as by him reminiscing on old conversations with his high school girlfriend. The film received positive reviews, with reviewers praising Wallen's acting and its cinematic nature.

The film also served to tease Dangerous: The Double Album, with him stating that the release date of the album could be found in the film. Fans spotted the numbers 1, 8, and 21 in the film, hinting at a release of January 8, 2021, the ultimate release date of the album.

== Commercial performance ==
"7 Summers" set the record for the biggest first-day streams for a country song on Apple Music, garnering 4.6 million streams and debuting at number three on the global chart. It also broke Spotify's first day record for a country track by a solo artist. The song debuted at number six on the US Billboard Hot 100, becoming Wallen's first top 10 entry, as well as the second top 10 debut ever for a song by a solo male country artist, the first since Chris Gaines (Garth Brooks)' "Lost in You" in 1999. This also made Wallen the first contestant from The Voice to score a top 10 single. The song would peak at number three on the Rolling Stone Top 100, the highest charting solo country song in the charts history.

The song peaked at number 15 on the Billboard Country Airplay chart in February 2021, becoming Wallen's first single to miss the top 10 on the airplay chart since his debut single "The Way I Talk" peaked at number 30 in 2017. Its chart run was halted as a result of SiriusXM Satellite Radio, iHeartRadio, Entercom, and Cumulus Media all issuing directives to their stations to remove Wallen's music from airplay, following controversy after the singer was caught on camera using a racial slur with friends as they were entering his Nashville home. The song has been certified 7× Platinum in the United States by the Recording Industry Association of America (RIAA).

"7 Summers" strong commercial performance was primarily driven by TikTok and streaming, a rare occurrence in country music which typically relies on radio airplay and physical sales more than other genres. The success of the song through streaming was cited by the Los Angeles Times as "helping move country music into the 21st century".

== Live performances ==
Wallen first performed "7 Summers" live on September 10, 2020, in Austin, Texas as part of Tito's Handmade Vodka Presents: Made to Order Festival. On December 5, 2020, Wallen performed the song on his Saturday Night Live debut to an audience of 6.1 million viewers. On January 8, 2021, Wallen performed the song live on The Bobby Bones Show along with other songs on his album.

== Credits and personnel ==
Information taken from AllMusic.

Personnel

- Morgan Wallen – songwriter
- Shane McAnally – songwriter
- Josh Osborne – songwriter
- Joey Moi – producer, background vocals
- Bryan Sutton – acoustic guitar, mandolin
- Dave Cohen – keyboards, organ
- Jerry Roe – drums
- Jimmie Lee Sloas – bass
- Tom Bukovac – electric guitar

Technical

- Scott Cooke – engineer
- Eivind Norland – engineer
- Ally Gecewicz – engineer
- Ted Jensen – mastering engineer
- Jeff Balding – recording engineer
- Ryan Yount – assistant recording engineer

== Charts ==
=== Weekly charts ===
Chart performance for "7 Summers"
Chart (2020–2021)	Peak position
Australia Country Hot 50 (TMN)	5
Canada Hot 100 (Billboard)	8
Canada Country (Billboard)	12
New Zealand Hot Singles (RMNZ)	14
UK Singles Downloads (Official Charts)	81
UK Singles Sales (OCC)	84
US Billboard Hot 100	6
US Adult Pop Airplay (Billboard)	36
US Country Airplay (Billboard)	15
US Hot Country Songs (Billboard)	1
US Rolling Stone Top 100	3

=== Year-end charts ===
Year-end chart performance for "7 Summers"
Chart (2020)	Position
US Hot Country Songs (Billboard)	51
Chart (2021)	Position
US Hot Country Songs (Billboard)	46

== Certifications ==
Certifications for "7 Summers"
Region	Certification	Certified units/sales
Australia (ARIA)	Platinum	70,000^{‡}
Canada (Music Canada)	4× Platinum	320,000^{‡}
New Zealand (RMNZ)	Gold	15,000^{‡}
United States (RIAA)	7× Platinum	7,000,000^{‡}
^{‡} Sales+streaming figures based on certification alone.
