= 865 (song) =

2021 song by Morgan Wallen

Song by Morgan Wallen

from the album Dangerous: The Double Album
- Released: January 8, 2021
- Genre: Country
- Length: 3:10
- Label: Big Loud; Republic
- Songwriters: Blake Pendergrass; John Byron
- Producer: Joey Moi

Lyric video
- "865" on YouTube

"865" is a song recorded by American country music singer Morgan Wallen. It was from his second studio album Dangerous: The Double Album.

== Background ==
"865" is an area code for East Tennessee, where Wallen calls home. He is from a small community in Hancock County known as Sneedville.

The song's original title was "919", but Wallen was unsure of the area code and wanted to change it to his area code of "865", he said: "865 is the area code that I use, and if I hear those 3 digits, it takes me back to place or time. It just makes me think of home. I thought it was a unique in the way that they used it". Therefore the whole number is 865-409-1021.

== Charts ==
=== Weekly charts ===
Weekly chart performance for "865"
Chart (2021)	Peak position
Canada Hot 100 (Billboard)	44
Global 200 (Billboard)	67
US Billboard Hot 100	46
US Hot Country Songs (Billboard)	13

=== Year-end charts ===
Year-end chart performance for "865"
Chart (2021)	Position
US Hot Country Songs (Billboard)	74

== Certifications ==
Region	Certification	Certified units/sales
Australia (ARIA)	Gold	35,000^{‡}
Canada (Music Canada)	Platinum	80,000^{‡}
United States (RIAA)	3× Platinum	3,000,000^{‡}
^{‡} Sales+streaming figures based on certification alone.
