= More Than My Hometown =

Single by Morgan Wallen

from the album Dangerous: The Double Album
- Released: May 27, 2020
- Genre: Country
- Length: 3:37
- Label: Big Loud
- Songwriters: Michael Hardy; Ernest Keith Smith; Morgan Wallen; Ryan Vojtesak
- Producer: Joey Moi

Morgan Wallen singles chronology
"Heartless" (2019)	"More Than My Hometown" (2020)	"7 Summers" (2020)

Music video
- "More Than My Hometown" on YouTube

"More Than My Hometown" is a song co-written and recorded by American country music singer Morgan Wallen. It was released on May 27, 2020, as the lead-off single from his second studio album Dangerous: The Double Album.

== Content ==
Wallen co-wrote "More Than My Hometown" with Michael Hardy, Ernest Keith Smith, and Ryan Vojtesak, and it was produced by Joey Moi. Lyrically, the song talks about small town love and finds the narrator drawing the line at moving away from his hometown to follow his girlfriend's big city dreams ("This might be the last time I get to lay you down, 'cause I can't love you more than my hometown").

== Music video ==
The music video was directed by Justin Clough and premiered on August 24, 2020. The video was filmed in Ashland City, Tennessee. Starring in the video is Morgan Wallen and a woman from the bachelor.

== Cover photo ==
The photograph used as the cover image for the single was taken looking southbound on Tennessee Highway 70 just north of Kyles Ford, Tennessee. One of the towns listed on the highway sign in the photo, Sneedville, is the actual native hometown of Morgan Wallen.

== Charts ==
=== Weekly charts ===
Chart (2020–2021)	Peak position
Australia Country Hot 50 (TMN)	2
Canada Hot 100 (Billboard)	22
Canada Country (Billboard)	1
US Billboard Hot 100	15
US Country Airplay (Billboard)	1
US Hot Country Songs (Billboard)	2
US Rolling Stone Top 100	18

=== Year-end charts ===
Chart (2020)	Position
Canada (Canadian Hot 100)	88
US Billboard Hot 100	96
US Country Airplay (Billboard)	50
US Hot Country Songs (Billboard)	17

Chart (2021)	Position
US Hot Country Songs (Billboard)	33

== Certifications ==
Region	Certification	Certified units/sales
Australia (ARIA)	2× Platinum	140,000^{‡}
Canada (Music Canada)	5× Platinum	400,000^{‡}
New Zealand (RMNZ)	Gold	15,000^{‡}
United Kingdom (BPI)	Silver	200,000^{‡}
United States (RIAA)	8× Platinum	8,000,000^{‡}
^{‡} Sales+streaming figures based on certification alone.

== Release history ==
Region	Date	Format	Label
United States	April 17, 2020	Digital download; streaming	Big Loud
United States	May 27, 2020	Country radio	Big Loud
