= Ernest (singer) =

American country musician

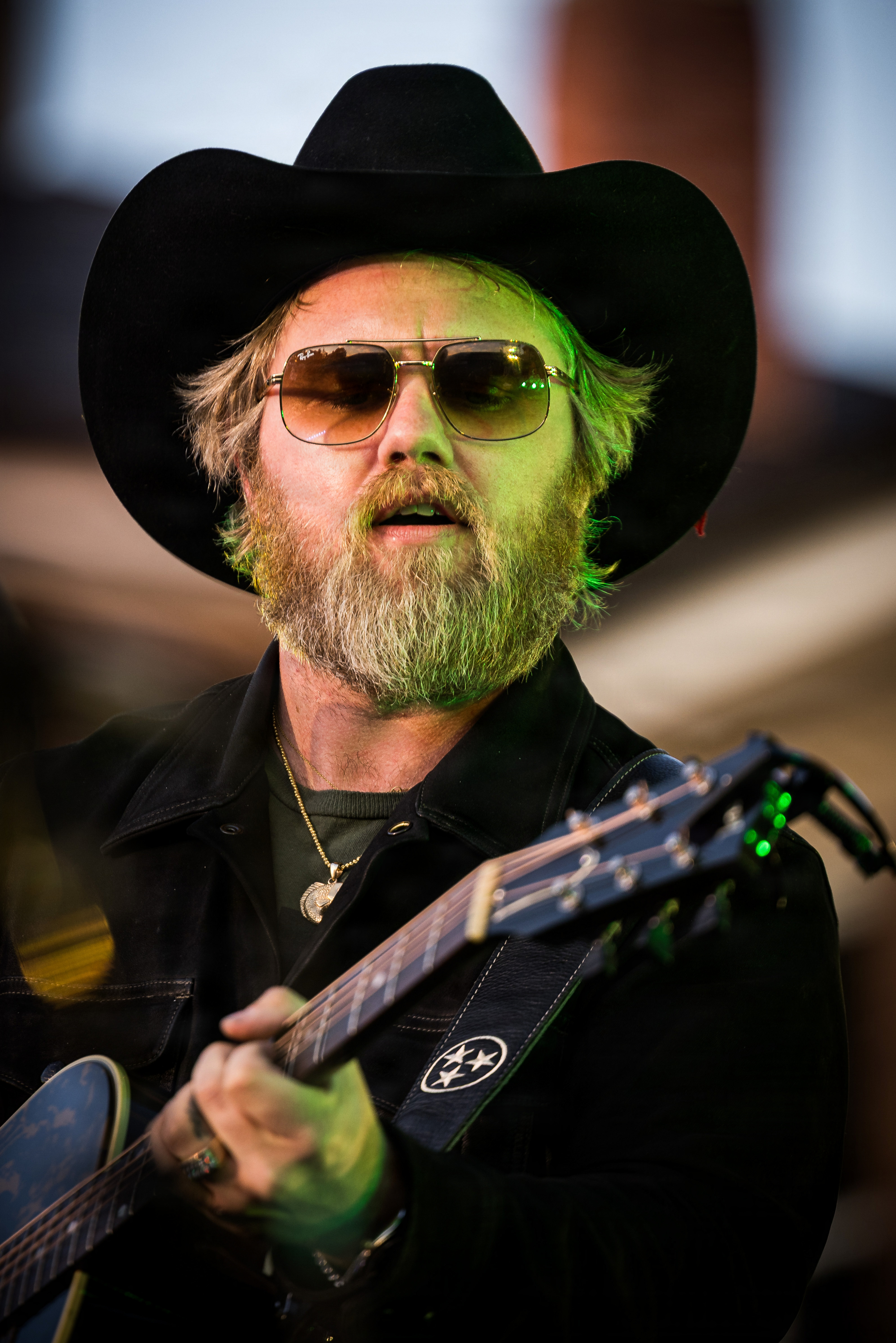
- Ernest performing in November 2025

Background information
- Born: Ernest Keith Smith; January 11, 1992 (age 34); Nashville, Tennessee, U.S.
- Genres: Country
- Occupation: Singer-songwriter
- Years active: 2017–present
- Label: Big Loud
- Website: ernestofficial.com

Ernest Keith Smith (born January 11, 1992), known mononymously as Ernest (stylized as ERNEST), is an American country music singer-songwriter. He has released three studio albums: Locals Only (2019), Flower Shops (The Album) (2022), and Nashville, Tennessee (2024). He has also written songs recorded by Morgan Wallen, Jake Owen, Florida Georgia Line, Thomas Rhett, Chris Lane, and Jelly Roll. His songs are produced by Joey Moi.

== Biography ==
Ernest was born and raised in Nashville, Tennessee and attended Lipscomb Academy there. He took an interest in hip hop music at an early age, citing the Space Jam soundtrack that he listened to in sixth grade as well as Eminem, John Mayer, and George Strait as his main influences. At age 19, he suffered a heart attack brought on by a viral infection. He developed a drug addiction while in college playing baseball in the National Junior College Athletic Association. After recovering, he moved back to Nashville and began writing and recording songs, in the bro-country style with Matt Royer, the brother of his now wife, who owned a recording studio. This association led to him co-writing the title track of Florida Georgia Line's 2016 album Dig Your Roots. The following year, recording under the mononym Ernest, he released country rap singles: "Dopeman" and "Bad Boy".

After writing songs for Chris Lane and Jake Owen, in September 2019, Ernest signed a recording contract and management agreement with Big Loud, the label to which both Owen and Lane are signed.

In April 2020, Ernest launched a podcast, Just Being Ernest, in which he talks to other musicians about the music industry. He recorded 50 episodes, mostly during the COVID-19 pandemic.

Ernest had further success as a songwriter in 2020 with Lane's "Big, Big Plans", Morgan Wallen's "More Than My Hometown", and Sam Hunt's "Breaking Up Was Easy in the 90s". He also released his first single for Big Loud, titled "Cheers".

Ernest was a co-writer on labelmate Dallas Smith's single "Hide from a Broken Heart", released in November 2021.

He released "Flower Shops", a duet with Wallen, in December 2021.

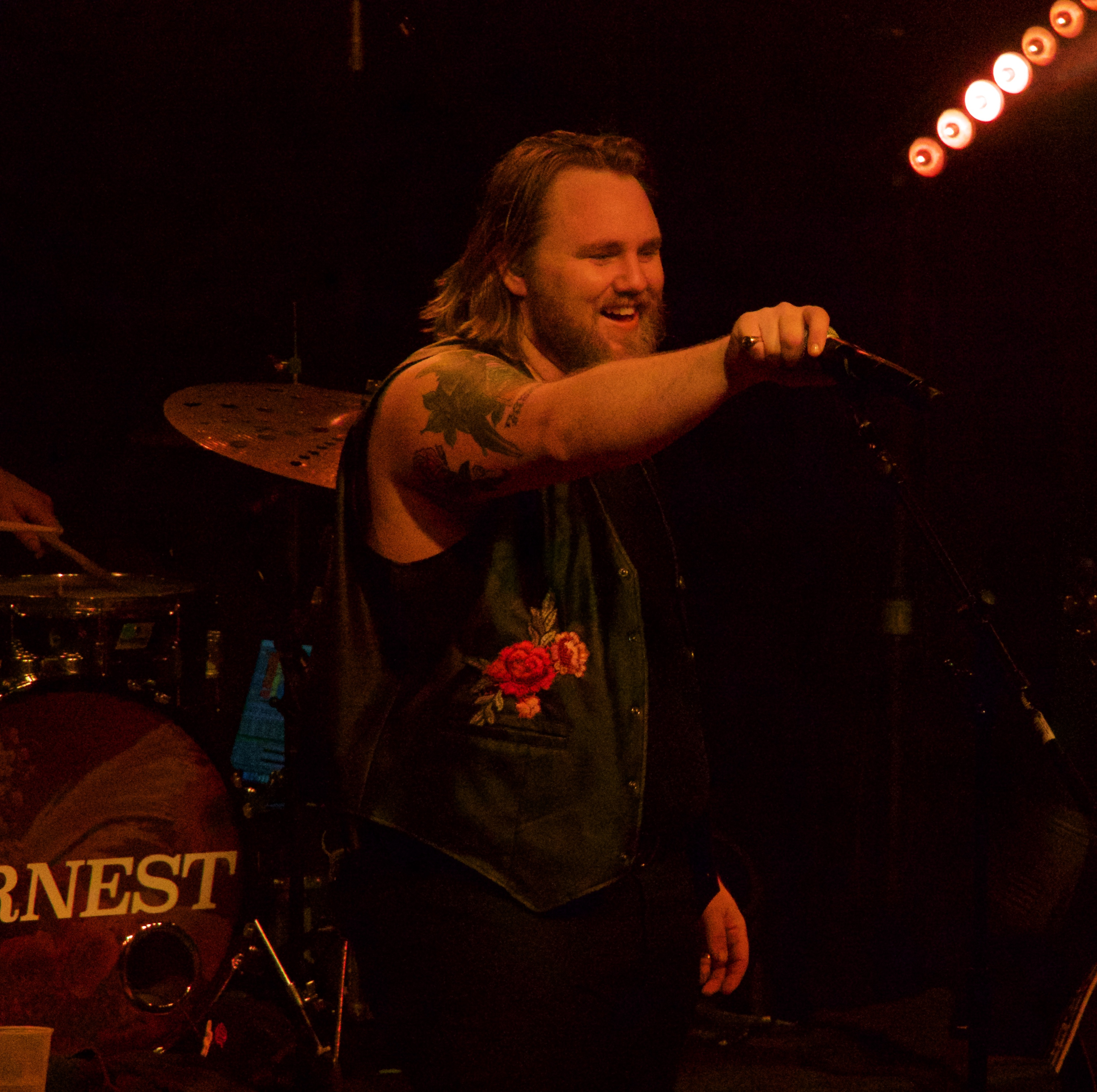
Ernest performing in Nashville, March 2022

In April 2024, he performed at Stagecoach Festival, also appearing in songs with Morgan Wallen and Willie Nelson.

== Personal life ==
Ernest is married to Delaney Royer and they have a son, Ryman, named after Ryman Auditorium. In 2022, they bought a farm with a greenhouse and chicken coop on 5 acres near Nashville. He frequently posts to TikTok and his wife handles his digital content. He is interested in fashion and has been friends with Mookie Betts since he was 8 years old; they often competed playing baseball. He attended Freed–Hardeman University but later dropped out to pursue music.

== Discography ==
=== Studio albums ===
Title	Album details	Peak chart positions	
Title	Album details	US	US Country
Locals Only	Release date: October 11, 2019; Label: Big Loud; Format: CD, LP, digital download, streaming	—	—
Flower Shops (The Album)	Release date: March 11, 2022; Label: Big Loud; Format: CD, LP, digital download, streaming	150	12
Nashville, Tennessee	Release date: April 12, 2024; Label: Big Loud; Format: CD, LP, digital download, streaming	170	34
Deep Blue	Release date: May 1, 2026; Label: Big Loud; Format: CD, LP, digital download, streaming	—	—
"—" denotes releases that did not chart

=== Reissues ===
Title	Album details
Flower Shops (The Album): Two Dozen Roses	Released: February 10, 2023; Label: Big Loud; Format: CD, LP, digital download, streaming

=== Singles ===
Year	Title	Peak chart positions						Certifications	Album
Year	Title	US	US Country	US Country Airplay	CAN	CAN Country	WW	Certifications	Album
2017	"Doperman"	—	—	—	—	—	—		Non-album singles
2017	"Bad Boy"	—	—	—	—	—	—		Non-album singles
2019	"I Think I Love You"	—	—	—	—	—	—		Locals Only
2020	"Cheers"	—	—	—	—	—	—		Non-album singles
2021	"American Rust"	—	—	—	—	—	—		Non-album singles
2022	"Flower Shops" (featuring Morgan Wallen)	64	13	18	62	16	192	RIAA: 2× Platinum; RMNZ: Gold	Flower Shops (The Album)
2024	"Cowgirls" (Morgan Wallen featuring Ernest)	12	3	1	21	1	47	RIAA: 6× Platinum; RMNZ: 2× Platinum	One Thing at a Time
2024	"Would If I Could" (solo or featuring Lainey Wilson)	—	—	26	—	54	—		Nashville, Tennessee
2025	"Blessed"	—	—	—	—	—	—		Live from the South
"—" denotes releases that did not chart

=== Other charted songs ===
Year	Title	Peak chart positions			Album
Year	Title	US	US Country	NZ Hot	Album
2024	"Hangin' On" (featuring Morgan Wallen)	—	37	38	Nashville, Tennessee
2024	"I Went to College / I Went to Jail" (featuring Jelly Roll)	—	—	—	Nashville, Tennessee
2024	"Why Dallas" (featuring Lukas Nelson)	—	—	—	Nashville, Tennessee
2024	"Devil I've Been" (Post Malone featuring Ernest)	66	—	—	F-1 Trillion
2025	"The Dealer" (Morgan Wallen featuring Ernest)	69	35	—	I'm the Problem
2025	"Gettin' Gone" (featuring Snoop Dogg)	—	—	—	Cadillac Sessions
2026	"Boat Named After You"	—	—	38	Non-album song
