= Walker Hayes discography =

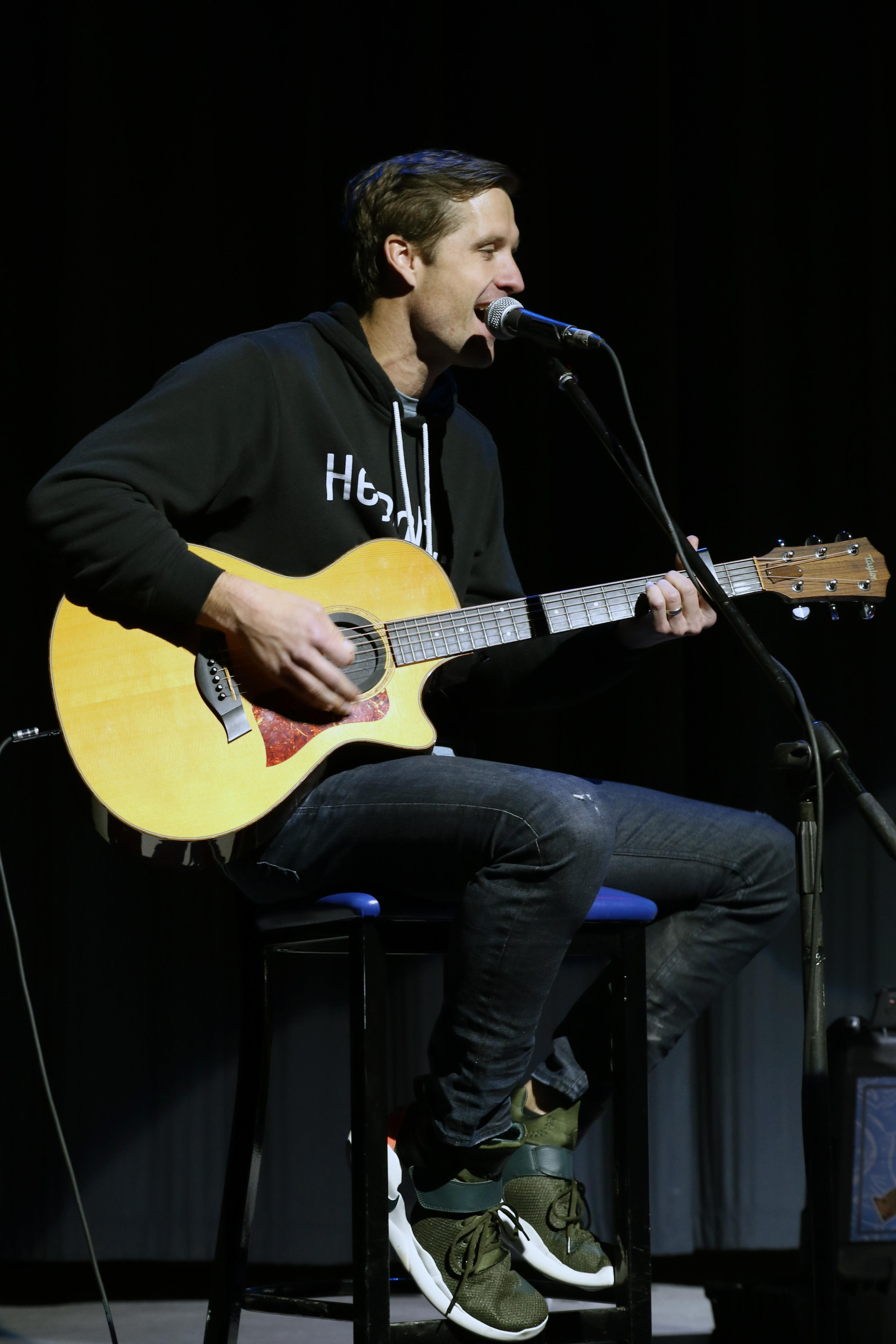
- Studio albums: 5
- EPs: 6
- Singles: 14
- Music videos: 9
- Promotional singles: 3
- Featured singles: 1

Walker Hayes is an American country music artist. His discography consists of five studio albums—Reason to Rhyme (2011), Boom (2017), Country Stuff the Album (2022), New Money (2023), and 17 Problems (2025).

== Studio albums ==
Title	Album details	Peak chart positions				Certifications	Sales
Title	Album details	US	US Country	AUS	CAN	Certifications	Sales
Reason to Rhyme	Release date: 2011; Label: Capitol Records Nashville	—	—	—	—		
Boom	Release date: December 8, 2017; Label: Monument	37	6	—	—		US: 32,600
Country Stuff the Album	Release date: January 21, 2022; Label: Monument	9	2	57	27	RIAA: Platinum; RMNZ: Gold	US: 16,000
New Money	Release date: September 29, 2023; Label: RCA; Format: Digital download, streaming	—	—	—	—		
17 Problems	Release date: August 22, 2025; Label: Monument/RCA; Format: Digital download, streaming	—	—	—	—		
"—" denotes releases that did not chart

== Extended plays ==
Title	EP details	Peak chart positions		
Title	EP details	US	US Country	CAN
Walker Hayes	Release date: September 21, 2010; Label: Capitol Records Nashville; Format: CD, digital download	— (Note: Walker Hayes did not enter the Billboard 200, but peaked at No. 43 on the Top Heatseekers)	66	—
8Tracks (Vol. 1): Good Shit	Release date: May 6, 2016; Label: SMACKSongs/RareSpark; Format: CD, digital download	—	—	—
8Tracks (Vol. 2): Break the Internet	Release date: August 19, 2016; Label: SMACKSongs/RareSpark; Format: CD, digital download	—	—	—
8Tracks (Vol. 3): Black Sheep	Release date: December 6, 2019; Label: Monument; Format: Digital download, streaming	—	—	—
Country Stuff	Release date: June 4, 2021; Label: Monument; Format: Digital download, streaming	32	4	41
Sober Thoughts	Release date: April 5, 2024; Label: Monument; Format: Digital download, streaming	—	—	—
"—" denotes releases that did not chart

== Singles ==
Year	Title	Peak chart positions							Certifications	Sales	Album
Year	Title	US	US Country	US Country Airplay	AUS	CAN	CAN Country	NZ Hot	Certifications	Sales	Album
2010	"Pants"	—	40		—	—	—	—			Reason to Rhyme
2011	"Why Wait for Summer"		42		—	—	—	—			Reason to Rhyme
2014	"Pimpin' Joy"	—	—	—	—	—	—	—			Non-album single
2017	"You Broke Up with Me"	62	9	10	—	100	17	—	RIAA: 2× Platinum; MC: Platinum	US: 397,000	Boom
2018	"Craig"	—	—	59	—	—	—	—			Boom
2018	"90's Country"	—	—	52	—	—	—	—	RIAA: Gold	US: 17,000	Non-album single
2019	"Don't Let Her"	—	—	56	—	—	—	—	RIAA: Gold		8Tracks (Vol. 3): Black Sheep
2020	"Trash My Heart"	—	—	—	—	—	—	—			Non-album single
2021	"Fancy Like"	3	1	1	42	9	3	31	RIAA: 7× Platinum; ARIA: Platinum; BPI: Silver; MC: 3× Platinum; RMNZ: 2× Platinum		Country Stuff the Album
2021	"U Gurl"	— (Note: "U Gurl" did not enter the Billboard Hot 100, but peaked at number eight on the Bubbling Under Hot 100 chart.)	28	—	—	—	—	—	RIAA: Gold		Country Stuff the Album
2021	"AA"	28	3	5	—	42	1	—	RIAA: 2× Platinum		Country Stuff the Album
2022	"Y'all Life"	— (Note: "Y'all Life" did not enter the Billboard Hot 100, but peaked at number 11 on the Bubbling Under Hot 100 chart.)	32	29	—	—	49	—	RIAA: Gold		Non-album single
2023	"Good with Me"	—	—	43	—	—	—	—			New Money
2023	"Fancy Like Christmas"	—	—	—	—	—	—	—			Christmas Vacation
"—" denotes releases that did not chart

=== Promotional singles ===
Year	Title	Album
2023	"Stetson"	New Money
2023	"Show Me the Country"	New Money
2024	"Ball Player"	Non-album single
2024	"5 to 9"	Non-album single
2025	"17 Year Old Problems"	17 Problems

=== Featured songs ===
Year	Title	Album
2024	"Smoke" (Connor Price featuring Walker Hayes)	Non-album single

== Music videos ==
Year	Title	Director
2010	"Pants"	Peter Zavadil
2015	"Dirty Side" (with Colt Ford)	—N/a
2017	"You Broke Up with Me"	Blythe Thomas
2018	"90's Country"	Alex Alvga
2018	"Craig"	
2018	"Don't Let Her"	
2021	"Fancy Like"	
2022	"AA"	Walker Hayes and Robert Chavers
2023	"Fancy Like Christmas"	Beaver / Bennette
