= Stetson (disambiguation) =

Stetson is a brand of hat.

Stetson may also refer to:

== Places ==
- Stetson, Maine, U.S.
- Stetson University, in Florida, U.S.
- Stetson (crater), on the Moon
- Stetson Bowl, a stadium in Surrey, British Columbia, Canada
- Stetson Hall, in Randolph, Massachusetts, U.S.
- Stetson House, in Hanover, Massachusetts, U.S.
- Stetson Mountain, in Washington County, Maine, U.S.
- Stetson Pond (Pembroke, Massachusetts), U.S.

== Other uses ==
- Stetson (name), including a list of people with the surname and given name
- John B. Stetson Company, the maker of Stetson hats
- "Stetson", a 2023 song by Walker Hayes
- Stetson School, in Barre, Massachusetts, U.S.
- Stetson, Street Dog of Park City, a short film adapted from a children's book
- The Stetsons, Australian country and western band

== See also ==
- John B. Stetson House, a historic home in DeLand, Florida, U.S.
