= 57th Academy of Country Music Awards =

Award ceremony for country music in 2021

- Date: March 7, 2022
- Location: Allegiant Stadium, Paradise, Nevada
- Hosted by: Dolly Parton; Jimmie Allen; Gabby Barrett

Highlights
- Most wins: Miranda Lambert; Carly Pearce; Lainey Wilson; (2 each)
- Most nominations: Miranda Lambert; Carly Pearce; Carrie Underwood; Chris Young; (4 each)

Television/radio coverage
- Network: Prime Video

The 57th Academy of Country Music Awards was held on March 7, 2022, at Allegiant Stadium in Paradise, Nevada. The show was hosted by ACM award winner Dolly Parton. Parton was joined by co-hosts, Jimmie Allen and Gabby Barrett. The ceremony was streamed live on Amazon Prime Video. In the main awards categories Miranda Lambert, Carly Pearce, Carrie Underwood, and Chris Young received the most nominations with four each.

== Background ==
On August 19, 2021, the Academy of Country Music announced that they would be leaving their longtime partner CBS, after Amazon acquired the rights. This marked the first time a major awards show had been live streamed exclusively.

== Winners and nominees ==
Nominations were announced on February 10, by Jimmie Allen and Gabby Barrett; the eligibility period for the nominations are January 1, 2021, through November 15, 2021.

Entertainer of the Year	Album of the Year
Miranda Lambert; Eric Church; Luke Combs; Chris Stapleton; Carrie Underwood	Dangerous: The Double Album – Morgan Wallen; 29: Written in Stone – Carly Pearce; Country Again: Side A – Thomas Rhett; Famous Friends – Chris Young; The Marfa Tapes – Miranda Lambert, Jack Ingram and Jon Randall
Female Artist of the Year	Male Artist of the Year
Carly Pearce; Gabby Barrett; Miranda Lambert; Ashley McBryde; Maren Morris	Chris Stapleton; Jimmie Allen; Luke Combs; Thomas Rhett; Morgan Wallen
Group of the Year	Duo of the Year
Old Dominion; Lady A; Little Big Town; Midland; The Cadillac Three	Brothers Osborne; Brooks & Dunn; Dan + Shay; LOCASH; Maddie & Tae
Single of the Year	Song of the Year
"If I Didn't Love You" – Jason Aldean and Carrie Underwood; "Buy Dirt" – Jordan Davis and Luke Bryan; "Famous Friends" – Chris Young and Kane Brown; "Fancy Like" – Walker Hayes; "You Should Probably Leave" – Chris Stapleton	"Things a Man Oughta Know" – Jason Nix, Jonathan Singleton, Lainey Wilson; "7 Summers" – Morgan Wallen, Josh Osborne, Shane McAnally; "Buy Dirt" – Jordan Davis, Jacob Davis, Josh Jenkins, Matt Jenkins; "Fancy Like" – Cameron Bartolini, Walker Hayes, Josh Jenkins, Shane Stevens; "Knowing You" – Adam James, Brett James, Kat Higgins
New Female Artist of the Year	New Male Artist of the Year
Lainey Wilson; Tenille Arts; Priscilla Block; Lily Rose; Caitlyn Smith	Parker McCollum; Hardy; Walker Hayes; Ryan Hurd; Elvie Shane
Songwriter of the Year	Video of the Year
Michael Hardy; Jesse Frasure; Nicolle Galyon; Ashley Gorley; Josh Osborne	"Drunk (And I Don't Wanna Go Home)" – Elle King and Miranda Lambert; Dir. Stephen Kinigopoulo, Alexa Kinigopoulos; "Famous Friends" – Chris Young and Kane Brown; Dir. Peter Zavadil; "I Bet You Think About Me" – Taylor Swift (feat. Chris Stapleton); Dir. Blake Lively; "If I Didn't Love You" – Jason Aldean and Carrie Underwood; Dir. Shaun Silva; "Never Wanted to Be That Girl" – Carly Pearce and Ashley McBryde; Dir. Ryan Byrd
Music Event of the Year
"Never Wanted to Be That Girl" – Carly Pearce and Ashley McBryde; "Buy Dirt" – Jordan Davis and Luke Bryan; "Famous Friends" – Chris Young and Kane Brown; "Half of My Hometown" – Kelsea Ballerini and Kenny Chesney; "If I Didn't Love You" – Jason Aldean and Carrie Underwood

== Performances ==
Performer(s)	Song(s)
Jimmie Allen; Gabby Barrett	"Viva Las Vegas" "Let's Go To Vegas"
Eric Church	"Drink in My Hand" "Guys Like Me" "Mr. Misunderstood" "Desperate Man" "Some of It" "Hell of a View"
Walker Hayes	"AA" "Fancy Like"
Maren Morris	"Circles Around This Town"
Parmalee; Blanco Brown; Brooke Eden	"Just the Way"
Chris Stapleton	"Watch You Burn"
Jimmie Allen	"Down Home"
Carly Pearce; Ashley McBryde	"Never Wanted to Be That Girl"
Thomas Rhett	"Slow Down Summer"
Dolly Parton; Kelsea Ballerini	"Big Dreams and Faded Jeans"
Brothers Osborne	"Skeletons"
Gabby Barrett	"I Hope You Dance"
Parker McCollum	"Pretty Heart"
Breland; Thomas Rhett	"Praise the Lord"
Lainey Wilson	"Things a Man Oughta Know"
Jason Aldean; Carrie Underwood	"If I Didn't Love You"
Kane Brown	"Leave You Alone"
Luke Bryan; Jordan Davis	"Buy Dirt"
Lady A	“What A Song Can Do”
Chris Young; Mitchell Tenpenny	"At the End of the Bar"
Chris Young	"Raised on Country"
Kelly Clarkson	"I Will Always Love You"
Brothers Osborne; Brittney Spencer	"These Boots Are Made for Walkin'"

Pre-show performances

- Tenille Townes – "When's It Gonna Happen"
- Kat & Alex – "I Want It All"

== Presenters ==
- Tom Pelphrey and Guy Torry – presented Duo and Group of the Year
- Jason Aldean – introduced Chris Stapleton
- Luke Grimes and Kelsey Asbille – presented Single and Song of the Year
- James Patterson – introduced Dolly Parton and Kelsea Ballerini
- Derek Carr – presented Album of the Year
- Mickey Guyton – recognized ACM Lifting Lives and ACM's partnership with St. Jude Children's Research Hospital
- Alan Ritchson – presented Male Artist and Female Artist of the Year
- Dolly Parton – presented Entertainer of the Year

== Milestones ==
- Jimmie Allen became the third black male to be nominated for Male Artist of the Year (two others include Charley Pride and Darius Rucker).
- After winning Entertainer of the Year, Miranda Lambert qualified for the coveted Triple Crown Award (she was recognized at the 2022 ACM Honors).
- Ryan Hurd and Maren Morris were the first married couple to be nominated in the same year since Tim McGraw and Faith Hill in 2017.
