= 2022 Billboard Music Awards =

Annual American music awards ceremony

- Date: May 15, 2022
- Location: MGM Grand Garden Arena, Las Vegas, Nevada, United States
- Country: United States
- Hosted by: Sean "Diddy" Combs
- Most awards: Olivia Rodrigo (7)
- Most nominations: The Weeknd (17)
- Website: billboardmusicawards.com

Television/radio coverage
- Network: NBC
- Viewership: 2.11 million
- Produced by: MRC Live, Alternative

The 2022 Billboard Music Awards were held on May 15, 2022, at the MGM Grand Garden Arena in Las Vegas. Hosted by Sean "Diddy" Combs, the show aired live on NBC and was also available for streaming on Peacock. Nominations across 62 categories—for releases during the period dated April 10, 2021 to March 26, 2022—were announced online through Twitter on April 8, 2022. The Weeknd received the most nominations of any artist, with 17; Doja Cat was the most-nominated female act with 14; BTS was the most-nominated group with seven.

Olivia Rodrigo won seven awards, including Top New Artist, and was the most-awarded artist at the show. Drake won five awards, including Top Artist, and extended his record as the most-awarded artist in BBMA history, with 34 wins overall. BTS won three awards, including Top Duo/Group, and became the most-awarded group in BBMA history with 12 wins overall, breaking a 17-year record previously held by Destiny's Child. Justin Bieber became the first artist to win the Billboard Music Award for Top Hot 100 Song for a second time since the category's inception in 1990. Mary J. Blige was honored with the 10th Billboard Icon Award.

== Background ==
Nominations were announced on April 8, 2022, via Twitter, and selected from releases during the eligibility period of March 26, 2021, through April 10, 2022, which corresponded to Billboard's chart dates of April 10, 2021, through March 26, 2022. Five new categories were included: Top Billboard Global 200 Artist, Top Billboard Global Excl. U.S. Artist, Top Billboard Global 200 Song, Top Billboard Global Excl. U.S. Song, and Top Viral Song, taking the ceremony's total to 62 categories. The global categories are based on Billboard's Global 200/Global Excl. U.S. charts launched in 2020 while the Viral Song category was created to honor songs that achieve virality on social media platforms, namely TikTok. No fan-voted categories were announced. Sean "Diddy" Combs was announced as the show's host (and executive producer alongside Robert Deaton) on April 22.

The awards were preceded by the first-ever Billboard MusicCon, a 2-day music event sponsored by Smirnoff and held on May 13 and 14 at Area15 in Las Vegas. Participants comprised both artists and executives, and included industry managers such as Dina Sahim (Swedish House Mafia, French Montana), Alex DePersia (Pharrell Williams, Gracie Abrams), and Nelly Ortiz (DJ Khaled). International artists invited as guest speakers included Anitta, Burna Boy, Ukrainian singer Max Barskih, and Rauw Alejandro. Anitta, Shenseea, Ty Dolla Sign, Latto, and Machine Gun Kelly were among the performers. Panels held included discussions on the evolution of the music scene across genres and cultures, and women in music, among other related topics.

== Broadcast and viewership ==
The show aired live on NBC and was also available for streaming on Peacock. It garnered the lowest viewership in the history of the ceremony, with 2.11 million viewers. The three-hour long broadcast earned an average 0.5 rating in the 18–49 demographic on NBC, dropping even lower than the previous year's 0.7 rating and 2.8 million audience. This later was surpassed but the next year’s event; which had lack of many viewers due to the ceremony being live streamed online.

== Performers ==
The first performance lineup was announced on April 19. It included four first-time performers: Rauw Alejandro, Megan Thee Stallion, Latto, and Burna Boy. Silk Sonic, Florence and the Machine, Maxwell—slated for a "special tribute performance to a pop icon"—and Morgan Wallen were announced on April 29. Ed Sheeran, Becky G, Miranda Lambert and Elle King, and Travis Scott were announced on May 9. The Red Hot Chili Peppers, who were included in the initial April 19 lineup, cancelled their performance on May 11, "due to unforeseen circumstances". Machine Gun Kelly and Dan + Shay were subsequently added.

Silk Sonic, Becky G, and Kelly made their BBMA performance debuts at the show. For Wallen, it was his first award show performance since being banned from attending and performing at various ceremonies in early 2021 after his racial slur controversy, while for Scott it was only his second live performance since the Astroworld Festival crowd crush in November 2021. Sheeran was unable to make it to the ceremony itself, but footage of his performance of 2Step during his Mathematics Tour gig at Boucher Roads Playinf Fields in Belfast, Northern Ireland was played during the ceremony. Icon Award recipient Mary J. Blige, who was originally announced as a performer on April 14, did not perform at the show.

Performer(s)	Song(s)	Ref(s)
Sean "Diddy" Combs Bryson Tiller Jack Harlow Teyana Taylor	Performance Medley "Gotta Move On" "First Class" "Mo Money Mo Problems" (Note: Taylor's daughter Junie participated in the performance)	
Silk Sonic	"Love's Train"	
Rauw Alejandro	"Cúrame" "Museo" "Todo de Ti"	
Florence and the Machine	"My Love"	
Miranda Lambert Elle King	"Drunk (And I Don't Wanna Go Home)"	
Latto	"Big Energy"	
Morgan Wallen	"Don't Think Jesus" "Wasted on You"	
Megan Thee Stallion	"Plan B" "Sweetest Pie"	
Dan + Shay	"You"	
Travis Scott	"Mafia" "Lost Forever"	
Machine Gun Kelly	"Twin Flame"	
Ed Sheeran	"2step"	
Becky G	"Bailé Con Mi Ex" "Mamiii"	
Maxwell	"The Lady in My Life" (Note: tribute performance in honor of the 40th anniversary of Michael Jackson's Thriller (1982))	
Burna Boy	"Last Last" "Kilometre"	

== Presenters ==
The initial list of presenters was released on May 13. Additional presenters were announced later that day and on the following, through the BBMAs official Twitter account.

- City Girls – presented Top R&B Artist
- Lainey Wilson – presented Top Rap Female Artist
- DJ Khaled and Heidi Klum – presented Top Rock Artist
- Fat Joe – introduced Florence and the Machine
- Michael Bublé and Anitta – presented Top Country Duo/Group
- AleXa — previewed "What's Coming Up"
- Diddy – presented the Revolt Black Excellence Award to Tamika Mallory and introduced Latto
- Liza Koshy – presented Top Dance/Electronic Album
- Shenseea – presented Pepsi Mic Drop
- Janet Jackson – presented the Icon Award
- Diddy and French Montana – introduced Travis Scott
- Pusha T – presented Top Country Male Artist
- Teyana Taylor — presented the Change Maker Award
- Diddy with graduates of Capital Prep — introduced Ed Sheeran
- Dove Cameron and Dixie D'Amelio – presented Top R&B Album
- Chloe Bailey – introduced Becky G
- Diddy – introduced Jozzy
- Giveon – introduced Burna Boy

== Winners and nominees ==
The Weeknd led the nominations for a second consecutive year, with 17 to his name. Doja Cat was the most-nominated female artist with 14. BTS earned the most nominations of any duo/group in BBMA history, with seven. Taylor Swift received a record-extending eighth nomination in the Top Artist category. Olivia Rodrigo, nominated alongside Swift in the aforementioned, also earned a nomination for Top New Artist, making her the third consecutive artist in BBMA history—Billie Eilish was the first, in 2020, followed by Pop Smoke in 2021—to be simultaneously nominated in both categories in the same year.

Winners for 54 non-televised awards were announced in a TikTok livestream on the red carpet, hosted by Tetris Kelly and Tiffany Taylor prior to the start of the show. The rest were revealed during the live television broadcast. Rodrigo won seven awards and was the most-awarded artist at the show. Drake garnered five awards, including Top Artist, taking his total wins to 34 overall and extending his record as the most-decorated artist in BBMA history. BTS won the most awards of any duo or group at the show, winning three of their seven nominations, including their third Top Duo/Group award which tied them with One Direction for the most wins in that category. They also became the most-awarded group in BBMA history—12 wins overall—breaking a 17-year record previously held by Destiny's Child with 11 wins. Bieber won his second award for Top Hot 100 Song, with "Stay", and became the only artist to win the award twice since it was first presented in 1990. Blige was honored with the 10th Billboard Icon Award, while youth activist Mari Copeny (Little Miss Flint) received the third Change Maker Award in honor of her environmental advocacy efforts for Flint, Michigan.

Winners are listed first and highlighted in bold.

Top Artist	Top New Artist	Top Male Artist
**Drake**; Doja Cat; Olivia Rodrigo; Taylor Swift; The Weeknd	**Olivia Rodrigo**; Giveon; The Kid Laroi; Masked Wolf; Pooh Shiesty	**Drake**; Justin Bieber; Lil Nas X; Ed Sheeran; The Weeknd
Top Female Artist	Top Duo/Group	Top Billboard 200 Artist
**Olivia Rodrigo**; Adele; Doja Cat; Dua Lipa; Taylor Swift	**BTS**; Glass Animals; Imagine Dragons; Migos; Silk Sonic (Bruno Mars, Anderson .Paak)	**Taylor Swift**; Adele; Drake; Juice Wrld; Morgan Wallen
Top Hot 100 Artist	Top Streaming Songs Artist	Top Song Sales Artist
**Olivia Rodrigo**; Justin Bieber; Doja Cat; Drake; The Weeknd	**Olivia Rodrigo**; Doja Cat; Drake; Lil Nas X; The Weeknd	**BTS**; Adele; Walker Hayes; Dua Lipa; Ed Sheeran
Top Radio Songs Artist	Top Billboard Global 200 Artist	Top Billboard Global (Excl. U.S.) Artist
**Olivia Rodrigo**; Justin Bieber; Doja Cat; Ed Sheeran; The Weeknd	**Olivia Rodrigo**; Doja Cat; Ed Sheeran; Justin Bieber; The Weeknd	**Ed Sheeran**; BTS; Dua Lipa; Olivia Rodrigo; The Weeknd
Top Tour	Top R&B Artist	Top R&B Male Artist
**The Rolling Stones (No Filter Tour)**; The Eagles (Hotel California Tour); Genesis (The Last Domino? Tour); Green Day, Fall Out Boy and Weezer (The Hella Mega Tour); Harry Styles (Love On Tour)	**Doja Cat**; Giveon; Silk Sonic (Bruno Mars, Anderson .Paak); Summer Walker; The Weeknd	**The Weeknd**; Giveon; Khalid
Top R&B Female	Top R&B Tour	Top Rap Artist
**Doja Cat**; SZA; Summer Walker	**Bruno Mars (Bruno Mars at Park MGM)**; Omarion and Bow Wow (The Millennium Tour 2021); Usher (The Vegas Residency)	**Drake**; Juice Wrld; Lil Baby; Moneybagg Yo; Polo G
Top Rap Male Artist	Top Rap Female Artist	Top Rap Tour
**Drake**; Juice Wrld; Polo G	**Megan Thee Stallion**; Cardi B; Latto	**Omarion and Bow Wow (The Millennium Tour 2021)**; J. Cole (The Off-Season Tour); Lil Baby (The Back Outside Tour)
Top Country Artist	Top Country Male Artist	Top Country Female Artist
**Taylor Swift**; Luke Combs; Walker Hayes; Chris Stapleton; Morgan Wallen	**Morgan Wallen**; Luke Combs; Chris Stapleton	**Taylor Swift**; Miranda Lambert; Carrie Underwood
Top Country Duo/Group	Top Country Tour	Top Rock Artist
**Dan + Shay**; Florida Georgia Line; Zac Brown Band	**Eric Church (Gather Again Tour)**; Luke Bryan (Proud to Be Right Here Tour); Chris Stapleton (All-American Road Show Tour)	**Glass Animals**; Imagine Dragons; Machine Gun Kelly; Måneskin; Twenty One Pilots
Top Rock Tour	Top Latin Artist	Top Latin Male Artist
**The Rolling Stones (No Filter Tour)**; Genesis (The Last Domino? Tour); Green Day, Fall Out Boy, and Weezer (The Hella Mega Tour)	**Bad Bunny**; Rauw Alejandro; Farruko; Kali Uchis; Karol G	**Bad Bunny**; Rauw Alejandro; Farruko
Top Latin Female Artist	Top Latin Duo/Group	Top Latin Tour
**Kali Uchis**; Karol G; Rosalía	**Eslabon Armado**; Calibre 50; Grupo Firme	**Los Bukis (Una Historia Cantada Tour)**; Bad Bunny (El Último Tour Del Mundo); Enrique Iglesias and Ricky Martin (Enrique Iglesias and Ricky Martin Live in Concert)
Top Dance/Electronic Artist	Top Christian Artist	Top Gospel Artist
**Lady Gaga**; David Guetta; Calvin Harris; Marshmello; Tiësto	**Ye**; Lauren Daigle; Elevation Worship; For King & Country; Carrie Underwood	**Ye**; Elevation Worship; Kirk Franklin; Maverick City Music; CeCe Winans
Top Billboard 200 Album	Top Soundtrack	Top R&B Album
**Olivia Rodrigo – Sour**; Adele – 30; Doja Cat – Planet Her; Drake – Certified Lover Boy; Morgan Wallen – Dangerous: The Double Album	**Encanto**; Arcane League of Legends; In The Heights; Sing 2; Tick, Tick...BOOM!	**Doja Cat – Planet Her**; Giveon – When It's All Said and Done...Take Time; Silk Sonic (Bruno Mars, Anderson .Paak) – An Evening with Silk Sonic; Summer Walker – Still Over It; The Weeknd – Dawn FM
Top Rap Album	Top Country Album	Top Rock Album
**Drake – Certified Lover Boy**; The Kid Laroi – F*ck Love; Moneybagg Yo – A Gangsta's Pain; Rod Wave – SoulFly; Ye – Donda	**Taylor Swift – Red (Taylor's Version)**; Lee Brice – Hey World; Florida Georgia Line – Life Rolls On; Walker Hayes – Country Stuff: The Album; Taylor Swift – Fearless (Taylor's Version)	**Twenty One Pilots – Scaled and Icy**; AJR – OK Orchestra; Coldplay – Music of the Spheres; Imagine Dragons – Mercury – Act 1; John Mayer – Sob Rock
Top Latin Album	Top Dance/Electronic Album	Top Christian Album
**Karol G – KG0516**; Rauw Alejandro – Vice Versa; Eslabon Armado – Corta Venas; J Balvin – Jose; Kali Uchis – Sin Miedo (del Amor y Otros Demonios)	**Illenium – Fallen Embers**; C418 – Minecraft – Volume Alpha; FKA Twigs – Caprisongs; Porter Robinson – Nurture; Rüfüs Du Sol – Surrender	**Ye – Donda**; Elevation Worship and Maverick City Music – Old Church Basement; Carrie Underwood – My Savior; Phil Wickham – Hymn of Heaven; CeCe Winans – Believe for It
Top Gospel Album	Top Hot 100 Song	Top Streaming Song
**Ye – Donda**; Elevation Worship and Maverick City Music – Old Church Basement; Maverick City Music – Jubilee: Juneteenth Edition; Maverick City Music and Upperroom – Move Your Heart; CeCe Winans – Believe for It	**The Kid Laroi and Justin Bieber – "Stay"**; Doja Cat featuring SZA – "Kiss Me More"; Dua Lipa – "Levitating"; Olivia Rodrigo – "Good 4 U"; The Weeknd and Ariana Grande – "Save Your Tears"	**The Kid Laroi and Justin Bieber – "Stay"**; Glass Animals – "Heat Waves"; Dua Lipa – "Levitating"; Olivia Rodrigo – "Good 4 U"; The Weeknd and Ariana Grande – "Save Your Tears"
Top Selling Song	Top Radio Song	Top Collaboration
**BTS – "Butter"**; BTS – "Permission to Dance"; Walker Hayes – "Fancy Like"; Dua Lipa – "Levitating"; Ed Sheeran – "Bad Habits"	**Dua Lipa – "Levitating"**; The Kid Laroi and Justin Bieber – "Stay"; Olivia Rodrigo – "Good 4 U"; Ed Sheeran – "Bad Habits"; The Weeknd and Ariana Grande – "Save Your Tears"	**The Kid Laroi and Justin Bieber – "Stay"**; Justin Bieber featuring Daniel Caesar and Giveon – "Peaches"; Doja Cat featuring SZA – "Kiss Me More"; Lil Nas X featuring Jack Harlow – "Industry Baby"; The Weeknd and Ariana Grande – "Save Your Tears"
Top Billboard Global 200 Song	Top Billboard Global 200 (Excl. U.S.) Song	Top Viral Song
**The Kid Laroi and Justin Bieber – "Stay"**; Dua Lipa – "Levitating"; Olivia Rodrigo – "Good 4 U"; Ed Sheeran – "Bad Habits"; The Weeknd and Ariana Grande – "Save Your Tears"	**The Kid Laroi and Justin Bieber – "Stay"**; BTS – "Butter"; Lil Nas X – "Montero (Call Me by Your Name)"; Ed Sheeran – "Bad Habits"; The Weeknd and Ariana Grande – "Save Your Tears"	**Doja Cat featuring SZA – "Kiss Me More"**; Gayle – "ABCDEFU"; Glass Animals – "Heat Waves"; Walker Hayes – "Fancy Like"; Masked Wolf – "Astronaut in the Ocean"
Top R&B Song	Top Rap Song	Top Country Song
**Silk Sonic (Bruno Mars, Anderson .Paak) – "Leave the Door Open"**; Justin Bieber featuring Daniel Caesar and Giveon – "Peaches"; Doja Cat and The Weeknd – "You Right"; Giveon – "Heartbreak Anniversary"; WizKid featuring Justin Bieber and Tems – "Essence"	**Lil Nas X featuring Jack Harlow – "Industry Baby"**; Drake featuring 21 Savage and Project Pat – "Knife Talk"; Drake featuring Future and Young Thug – "Way 2 Sexy"; Masked Wolf – "Astronaut in the Ocean"; Polo G – "Rapstar"	**Walker Hayes – "Fancy Like"**; Jason Aldean and Carrie Underwood – "If I Didn't Love You"; Luke Combs – "Forever After All"; Jordan Davis featuring Luke Bryan – "Buy Dirt"; Chris Stapleton – "You Should Probably Leave"
Top Rock Song	Top Latin Song	Top Dance/Electronic Song
**Måneskin – "Beggin'"**; Coldplay and BTS – "My Universe"; Imagine Dragons – "Follow You"; Elle King and Miranda Lambert – "Drunk (And I Don't Wanna Go Home)"; The Anxiety (Willow and Tyler Cole) – "Meet Me at Our Spot"	**Kali Uchis – "Telepatía"**; Rauw Alejandro – "Todo de Ti"; Aventura and Bad Bunny – "Volví"; Bad Bunny – "Yonaguni"; Farruko – "Pepas"	**Elton John and Dua Lipa – "Cold Heart (Pnau remix)"**; Farruko – "Pepas"; Regard, Troye Sivan, and Tate McRae – "You"; Travis Scott and HVME – "Goosebumps"; Tiësto – "The Business"
Top Christian Song	Top Gospel Song	Change Maker Award
**Ye – "Hurricane"**; Anne Wilson – "My Jesus"; Ye – "Moon"; Ye – "Off The Grid"; Ye – "Praise God"	**Ye – "Hurricane"**; Elevation Worship and Maverick City Music featuring Chandler Moore and Naomi Raine – "Jireh"; Ye – "Moon"; Ye – "Off the Grid"; Ye – "Praise God"	**Mari Copeny**
Icon Award
**Mary J. Blige**
