= Robert C. Long =

Major League Baseball Umpire (born 1959)

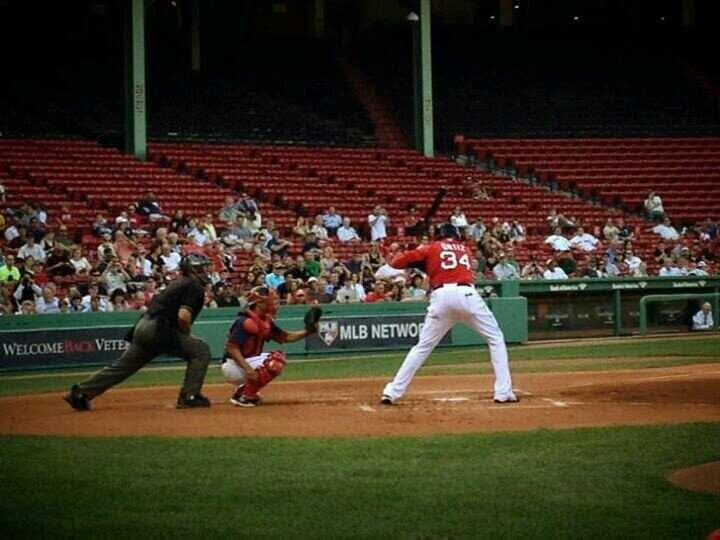

Robert C.(Bob) Long' born August 5, 1959 is a former professional baseball umpire. He umpired Major League Baseball (MLB) games in 1992 and 1993.

Born in Salem, Massachusetts, and raised in Randolph, Massachusetts, Long began umpiring at the age of thirteen in the South Randolph Little League where his father was in charge of the umpires. He was a two-sport star and member of the 1977 undefeated Randolph High School baseball team. After graduating from high school in 1977, Long played semi-pro baseball and had several professional tryouts before attending the Joe Brinkman Umpire School in 1982. His professional career began that same year, when he was assigned to the New York–Penn League, after which he was promoted to the Florida State League. After two years, he was then assigned to the Double-A Eastern League. During that time, he also umpired in the Venezuelan Professional Baseball League. Following his four years, in the Eastern League, Long was promoted to the Triple-A International League in 1989, where he was voted that leagues top umpiring prospect by Baseball America.

While in the International League, his contract was purchased by the National League. His first MLB game was on August 22,1992 at Veterans Stadium in Philadelphia, with the hometown Phillies hosting the Houston Astros. He worked a total of 12 Major League games in 1992 and 1993. His last year as a full-time professional umpire was 1993, but he continued to work in Triple-A as needed until 2017, when he retired from professional baseball.

He is a member of the Randolph High School Hall of Fame and the Cranberry Baseball League Hall of Fame. He continues to work amateur baseball in the Boston area and speak and teach about the umpiring profession.
