= Shane Stevens (songwriter) =

American singer-songwriter

- Born: Shane Pittman; Myrtle Beach, South Carolina
- Genres: Country; Pop
- Occupation: Singer-songwriter
- Years active: 1996–present

Shane Pittman, better known by his stage name Shane Stevens, is an American singer-songwriter born in Myrtle Beach, South Carolina.

Stevens has written for a variety of country and pop acts, including Sara Evans, Carrie Underwood, Lady Antebellum, Kellie Pickler, Jordin Sparks, Ronnie Milsap, Jo Dee Messina, and Hayden Panettiere. Stevens has had multiple singles released to country radio and scored his first Billboard number 1 country hit, "American Honey," with Lady Antebellum in 2010. The song was co-written with Hillary Lindsey and Cary Barlowe.

Stevens contributed the song "Nobody" to Selena Gomez's 2015 album Revival.

== Early and Personal Life ==
Shane Pittman was born in Grand Strand Medical Center in Myrtle Beach, South Carolina and was raised in Calabash, North Carolina, a small fishing town. His dad was a shrimper. He originally hated country music as a boy, listening to Michael Jackson, George Michael, Mariah Carey, Paula Abdul, and Whitney Houston, but as a teenager, a friend of his named Tina got him into the genre. He is also childhood friends with Karyn Rochelle, another song-writer.

In 1997, he moved to Nashville, Tennessee at age 17 with Rochelle. Before being a song-writer, he was a hairdresser, and became best friends with Sara Evans during his hairdressing career. In 2001, he moved to Ukrainian Village, Manhattan in New York City, a week before the September 11th terrorist attack. He then moved to the Upper East Side.

Stevens is gay and a Christian. Along with song-writing, he is also a singer and whistler.

== Career ==
While waiting tables, he met Jerry Crutchfield, who took a liking to him and Rochelle after learning they both wrote music. Stevens signed his first publishing deal with Famous Music in 2001 before signing with Major Bob Music five years later.

Stevens co-wrote 2 songs with Rochelle and country music star Sara Evans for Evans' 2014 album Slow Me Down. He also co-wrote the only original song and title track on Evans' Christmas album, At Christmas, with Toby Lightman. He then contributed 4 songs to the 2014 Jesse McCartney album In Technicolor, including the second single, "Superbad."

He moved to Los Angeles in 2014 to pursue a new direction as a writer, vocal producer, and artist developer in the pop and R&B world. That same year, Stevens founded his own publishing and artist development company, Holy Graffiti LLC, administered by Kobalt Music Group. The first act under his development, The Heirs, has been signed to Capitol Records and they released their debut EP, "Ecliptic," on August 28.

For 2015, Stevens has contributed songs to several pop artists, such as "Everlasting Love," co-written with Victoria Monet and Tommy Brown, on Fifth Harmony's debut album Reflection; "Paper Doll" for Bea Miller's album Not An Apology; "Paradise" for Little Boots' album Working Girl; and At Sunset's single "Every Little Thing."

2016 is already shaping up to be a successful year for Shane, working on songs for many popular artists, such as the track "Step On Up" from Ariana Grande's album Dangerous Woman. He also worked with Meghan Trainor on the song "Woman Up" from her second album Thank You and Toby Randall's song "Misfits." Two songs off of Martina Stoessel & Jorge Blanco's album Tini, "I Want You" and "Yo Te Amo a Ti," were written by Shane as well. Most recently, Shane worked on what Pop Crush has dubbed the song of the summer "What You Want" by The Heirs. He also co-wrote "Infinite Love" by country star Sara Evans & Chrisley Know's Best star Todd Chrisley, which was featured on the season 4 finale.

In 2019, Stevens sold a country music musical to Paramount Pictures, where he co wrote the music with his childhood friend Karyn Rochelle.

Stevens signed a worldwide co-publishing deal with Bob Doyle's publishing company Purplebeat in 2021 where Stevens received his first Grammy nomination for the song "Fancy Like" by Walker Hayes.

== Television ==
Stevens starred alongside Sherrié Austin and an ensemble cast in the second season of the SundanceTV docuseries Girls Who Like Boys Who Like Boys.

== Awards ==
In 2011, Stevens' co-write for Lady Antebellum's "American Honey" won the Nashville Songwriters Association International award for one of the "Songs I Wish I'd Written," as well as the Millionaire and Most-Performed Country Songs of the Year awards from BMI for this song.

== Discography ==
Artist	Album	Song
Walker Hayes	Country Stuff (2021)	"Fancy Like"
Walker Hayes	Country Stuff (2021)	"Make You Cry"
Jessie James Decker	The Woman I've Become (EP) (2021)	"I Need A Man"
Mizki	Single (2021)	"Crazy For You"
Cassadee Pope	Rise and Shine (2020)	"Sand Paper"
Cassadee Pope	Rise and Shine (2020)	"California Dreaming"
BRKN LOVE	BRKN LOVE (2020)	"Oxygen"
Toby Lightman	Single (2020)	"Begin Again"
Toby Lightman	Single (2020)	"Ebb and Flow"
Kelly Rowland	Single (2019)	Love You More at Christmas Time
Jessie James Decker	Single (2019)	"Roots and Wings"
Ronnie Milsap	The Duets (2019)	"You're Nobody (feat. Steven Curtis Chapman)"
Vanic	Single (2019)	"Save Yourself"
Niki and Gabi	Single (2019)	"hair tie"
Riri (Japanese singer)	NEO (2018)	"Honey"
Little Big Town	[The Breaker (album)] (2017)	"Beat Up Bible"
Jessie James Decker	Southern Girl City Lights (2017)	"Hungry"
Jessie James Decker	My Little Pony: The Movie (Original Motion Picture Soundtrack (2017)	"I'll Chase The Sky"
Lukas Nelson	My Little Pony: The Movie (Original Motion Picture Soundtrack (2017)	"Neighsayer"
CL	My Little Pony: The Movie (Original Motion Picture Soundtrack (2017)	"No Better Feelin'"
Sara Evans	Words (2017)	"I Want You"
Johnny Manuel	Single (2017)	"Blind Faith"
Sara Evans & Todd Chrisley	Single (2016)	"Infinite Love"
The Heirs	Single (2016)	"What You Want"
Ariana Grande	Dangerous Woman (2016)	"Step On Up"
Meghan Trainor	Thank You (2016)	"Woman Up"
Martina Stoessel	Tini (2016)	"I Want You" "Yo Te Amo a Ti"
Toby Randall	Single (2016)	"Misfits"
Selena Gomez	Revival (2015)	"Nobody"
Fifth Harmony	Reflection (2015)	"Everlasting Love"
Little Mix	Get Weird (2015)	"Love Me or Leave Me"
Bea Miller	Not an Apology (2015)	"Paper Doll"
At Sunset	Single (2015)	"Every Little Thing"
The Heirs	Ecliptic – EP (2015)	"Alright Goodnight" "Lies" "Ecliptic"
Little Boots	Working Girl (2015)	"Paradise"
Sara Evans	Slow Me Down (2014)	"Sweet Spot" "If I Run"
Sara Evans	At Christmas (2014)	"At Christmas"
Jesse McCartney	In Technicolor (2014)	"In Technicolor, Pt. I" "In Technicolor, Pt. II" "Superbad" "Goodie Bag"
Ashley Roberts	Butterfly Effect (2014)	"Woman Up"
Brandon and Savannah	Single (2013)	"California Christmas"
Carrie Underwood	Blown Away (2012)	"Do You Think About Me"
Hayden Panettiere	The Music of Nashville, Season 1: The Complete Collection (2012)	"I'm A Girl"
Shane Stevens	Single (2011)	"Back to Earth"
Danny Gokey	Single (2011)	"Second Hand Heart"
Steel Magnolia	Steel Magnolia (2011)	"Not Tonight"
Montgomery Gentry	Rebels on the Run (2011)	"I Like Those People"
Mark Wills	Looking for America (2011)	"Rather Be"
Sherrié Austin	Circus Girl (2011)	"Naughty or Nice"
Naomi Scott	Lemonade Mouth (2011)	"She's So Gone"
Lil Larry	Single (2011)	"Beautiful Thing"
Joana Zimmer	Single (2011)	"Tempted By Your Touch"
Joana Zimmer	Single (2010)	"Till You're Gone"
Lady Antebellum	Need You Now (2010)	"American Honey"
Jo Dee Messina	Unmistakable: Love (2010)	"Welcome to the Rest of My Life"
Jo Dee Messina	Unmistakable: Inspiration (2010)	"Get Up Again"
Jordin Sparks	Battlefield (2009)	"Was I The Only One"
Mallary Hope	Single (2009)	"Love Lives On"
Gloriana	Gloriana (2009)	"Over Me Now"
Kellie Pickler	Kellie Pickler (2008)	"Makin' Me Fall in Love Again"
Sara Evans	Billy: The Early Years (soundtrack) (2008)	"Low"
