= Vernon Crawford =

American football player and coach (born 1974)

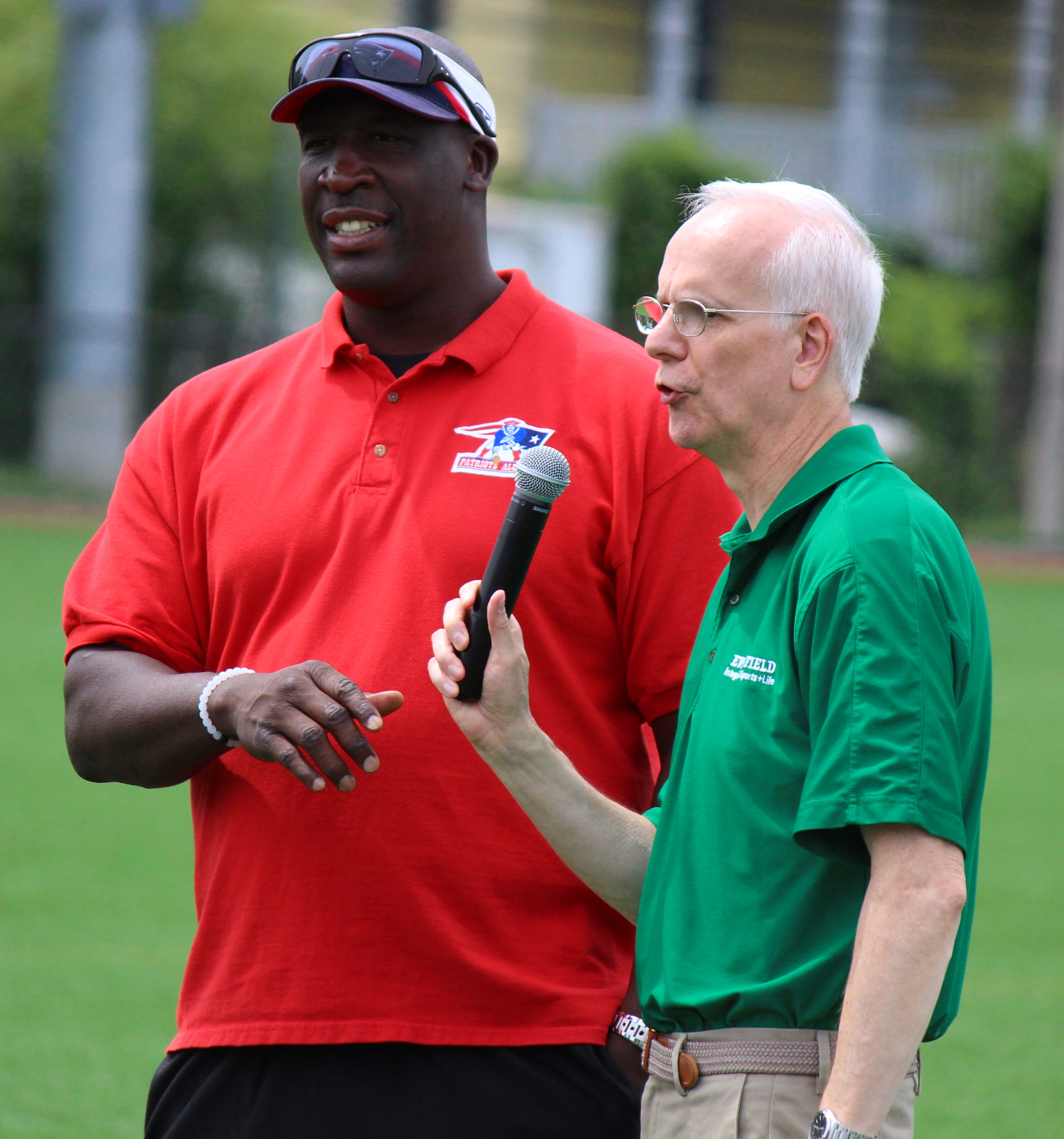
- Crawford (left) with Chuck Wilson in 2015

No. 99, 62
- Position: Linebacker

Personal information
- Born: June 25, 1974 (age 52); Texas City, Texas, U.S.
- Listed height: 6 ft 4 in (1.93 m)
- Listed weight: 245 lb (111 kg)

Career information
- High school: Texas City
- College: Florida State
- NFL draft: 1997: 5th round, 159th overall pick

Career history

Playing
- New England Patriots (1997–1999); Green Bay Packers (2000)*; New York/New Jersey Hitmen (2001); Manchester Wolves (2004)
- * Offseason or practice squad member only

Coaching
- Randolph (MA) HS (2004–2006) Defensive coordinator; Randolph (MA) HS (2007–2008) Head coach; Curry College (2009–2011) Wide receivers; Seekonk (MA) HS (2012–present) Head coach; Mass Mutiny (Massachusetts) Women's Team; Boston Militia (Massachusetts) Women's Team (2008-2014) Defensive coordinator; Boston Renegades Women's Tackle Football Team (2016-present) Offensive coordinator/Assistant coach

Career NFL statistics
- Tackles: 17
- Fumble recoveries: 1
- Stats at Pro Football Reference

Vernon Dean Crawford Jr. (born June 25, 1974) is an American former professional football player who was a linebacker for three seasons with the New England Patriots of the National Football League (NFL). He played college football for the Florida State Seminoles and was selected by the Patriots in the fifth round of the 1997 NFL draft. He played college football for the Florida State Seminoles.

Crawford attended the City College of San Francisco and then was a two-year starter at Florida State University. A fifth-round draft selection in 1997, he was employed by the Patriots primarily as a special teams performer and had his most productive season in 1998 when he posted 13 tackles as a linebacker and 14 stops on special teams. He left the Patriots and was signed by the Green Bay Packers in July 2000, but spent all of the season on the injured reserve list.

After a few seasons in minor football leagues, Crawford retired as a player and turned to coaching, first at Randolph High School, then at Curry College. He was the Defensive Coach for the Mass Mutiny, He coached the Boston Militia women's football team, which won three national titles, and continues to coach the Boston Renegades women's team. He is also the head football coach at Seekonk High School, where he led the Warriors to sectional finals appearance in 2016.
