= Country Stuff the Album =

Studio album by Walker Hayes
- Released: January 21, 2022
- Genre: Country
- Length: 39:33
- Label: Monument Nashville
- Producer: Tofer Brown; Dylan Guthro; Walker Hayes; Shane McAnally; Jordan Mohilowski; Nash Overstreet; Tedd T.; Joe Thibodeau

Walker Hayes chronology
| Country Stuff (2021) | Country Stuff the Album (2022) | New Money (2023) |

Singles from Country Stuff the Album
- 1. "Fancy Like" Released: August 2, 2021; 2. "U Gurl" Released: October 15, 2021; 3. "AA" Released: November 19, 2021

Country Stuff the Album ratings
Review scores
| Source | Rating |
|---|---|
| AllMusic | 3.5/5 stars |

Country Stuff the Album is the third studio album by American country music singer Walker Hayes. It was released on January 21, 2022, via Monument Records Nashville.

== Content ==
Country Stuff the Album was preceded in 2021 by its lead single "Fancy Like", which topped the Billboard Hot Country Songs and Country Airplay charts. The song also won Billboard's Top Country Song and was nominated for a Grammy for Best Country Song. Also released from the album as singles were "U Gurl" and "AA". Six cuts from the album previously appeared on an EP released in 2021, also titled Country Stuff. In addition, the album features a re-recording of his 2018 single "Craig" featuring guest vocals from MercyMe. Hayes co-produced with Shane McAnally and Joe Thibodeau.

== Commercial reception ==
In the United States, Country Stuff: The Album debuted at number 9 on Billboard 200 with 33,000 units (16,000 pure sales), becoming his first top 10 album in the country. Thanks to the album, Hayes entered Billboard's Artist 100 chart at number 8 for the first time.

== Track listing ==
All tracks are written by Walker Hayes, with additional co-writers as noted.

Country Stuff the Album track listing
| No. | Title | Writer(s) | Length |
|---|---|---|---|
| 1. | "Drinking Songs" | Jordan Gray | 3:12 |
| 2. | "AA" | Shane McAnally; Luke Laird | 3:09 |
| 3. | "Life with You" | Dylan Guthro; Adam Hambrick | 3:00 |
| 4. | "U Gurl" | D. Guthro; Jodi Guthro | 2:32 |
| 5. | "Delorean" | Sno Smith; Charlie Handsome | 2:39 |
| 6. | "Fancy Like" | Cameron Bartolini; Josh Jenkins; Shane Stevens | 2:41 |
| 7. | "Craig" (with MercyMe) | | 3:35 |
| 8. | "What You Don't Wish For" | | 3:00 |
| 9. | "Country Stuff" (featuring Jake Owen) | Joe Thibodeau; Adam Stark | 2:34 |
| 10. | "I Hope You Miss Me" | McAnally; Sam Summer; Nick Ruth; Sean Smalls | 3:23 |
| 11. | "Briefcase" (featuring Lori McKenna) | McKenna | 3:28 |
| 12. | "Make You Cry" | Nash Overstreet; Stevens | 3:09 |
| 13. | "What If We Did" (featuring Carly Pearce) | Emily Falvey; Tofer Brown | 3:11 |
| Total length: | | | 39:33 |

== Personnel ==
- Tofer Brown – drum programming (track 13), piano (track 13), synthesizer (track 13)
- Nathan Cochren – bass guitar (track 7)
- Dave Cohen – B-3 organ (track 10), synthesizer (track 10)
- Bethany Cruz – background vocals (track 7)
- Kris Donegan – acoustic guitar (tracks 10–13), banjo (tracks 12, 13), electric guitar (track 10)
- David Dorn – piano (tracks 12, 13), synthesizer (tracks 11–13)
- Dylan Guthro – bass/808 programming (track 4), dobro (track 4) drum programming (track 4), ganjo (track 4), lap steel guitar (track 4), synthesizer (track 4), background vocals (track 4)
- Charlie Handsome – acoustic guitar (track 5), electric guitar (track 5)
- Lela Hayes – background vocals (track 2)
- Walker Hayes – acoustic guitar (tracks 1–3, 5–10), bass synthesizer (track 6), beatboxing (tracks 6, 9), drum programming (tracks 10, 11), electric guitar (track 12), mandolin (track 12), organ (track 10), synthesizer (track 11) vocals (all tracks), background vocals (tracks 4, 10–12)
- David Huff – drum programming (track 10)
- Evan Hutchings – drums (tracks 10–13), percussion (tracks 10, 12, 13)
- Tony Lucido – bass guitar (tracks 10–13)
- Lori McKenna – background vocals (track 11)
- Jordan Mohilowski – programming (track 7)
- Montell Moore – background vocals (track 7)
- Justin Niebank – drum programming (tracks 10–13)
- Nash Overstreet – drum programming (track 12), synthesizer (track 12)
- Jake Owen – featured vocals (track 9)
- Carly Pearce – featured vocals (track 13)
- Sol Philcox-Littlefield – electric guitar (tracks 10–13)
- Robby Shaffer – drums (track 7)
- Adam Stark – acoustic guitar (tracks 1–3, 5), electric guitar (tracks 1–3, 5, 6, 8), pedal steel guitar (track 6), slide guitar (tracks 6, 9)
- Tedd T. – programming (track 7)
- Joe Thibodeau – bass guitar (track 2), bass programming (tracks 1, 3, 5, 8), bass synthesizer (track 9), drum programming (tracks 1–3, 5, 6, 8, 9), drums (tracks 1, 2), percussion (track 2), synth programming (tracks 3, 5, 8)

== Charts ==
=== Weekly charts ===
Weekly chart performance for Country Stuff the Album
| Chart (2022) | Peak position |
|---|---|
| Australian Albums (ARIA) | 57 |
| Canadian Albums (Billboard) | 27 |
| US Billboard 200 | 9 |
| US Top Country Albums (Billboard) | 2 |

=== Year-end charts ===
2022 year-end chart performance for Country Stuff the Album
| Chart (2022) | Position |
|---|---|
| US Billboard 200 | 111 |
| US Top Country Albums (Billboard) | 10 |

2023 year-end chart performance for Country Stuff the Album
| Chart (2023) | Position |
|---|---|
| US Top Country Albums (Billboard) | 47 |

== Certifications ==
Certifications for Country Stuff the Album
| Region | Certification | Certified units/sales |
|---|---|---|
| New Zealand (RMNZ) | Gold | 7,500^{‡} |
| United States (RIAA) | Platinum | 1,000,000^{‡} |
^{‡} Sales+streaming figures based on certification alone.
