= Ebenezer Alden =

American physician

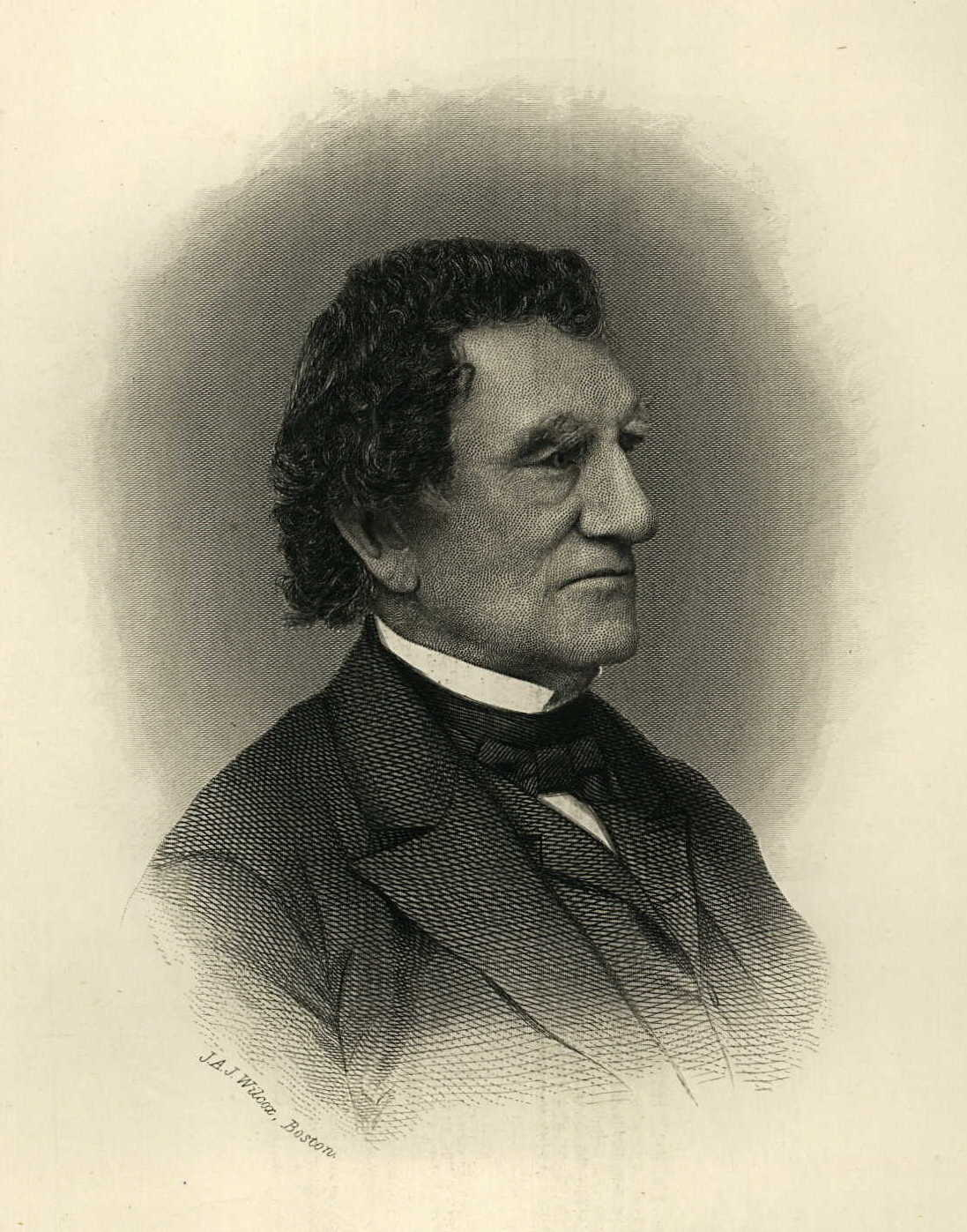
- Born: March 17, 1788; Randolph
- Died: January 26, 1881; Randolph
- Education: Harvard College, Geisel School of Medicine, Perelman School of Medicine
- Occupations: Biographer, medical doctor
- Father: Ebenezer Alden

Ebenezer Alden Jr. (March 17, 1788 – January 26, 1881) was an American medical biographer, Army surgeon, and medical doctor.

== Biography ==
Ebenezer Alden Jr. was born on March 17, 1788 in Randolph, Massachusetts. He was descended through both father (Dr. Ebenezer Alden) and mother (Sarah Bass) directly from John Alden of the Mayflower.

He graduated from Harvard College in 1808 and received his M. B. from Dartmouth Medical School in 1811 and M. D. from the University of Pennsylvania in 1812, during his pupilage coming under the instruction of Nathan Smith, Benjamin Rush, Benjamin Smith Barton, and Casper Wistar.

Following graduation, he was employed as a surgeon in the U.S. Army during the War of 1812, and was stationed in Boston.

He returned to Randolph to practice medicine. In 1818 he married Anne Kimball, daughter of Capt. Edmund Kimball, of Newburyport; they had six children.

From 1837 to near the close of life he was a trustee of Phillips Academy and Andover Theological Seminary. He was also a trustee of Amherst College and was one of the original trustees of Thayer Academy of Braintree. He was elected as one of nine Counsellors for the newly-formed American Statistical Association in 1839. He was a dedicated member of the First Congregational Church, Randolph.

Alden was a bibliophile and built up a notable private library of rare books and pamphlets, especially those pertaining to the history of American medicine and the ecclesiastical and civil history of New England. Some of his books eventually were donated to the Medical Society of the County of Kings, Brooklyn, NY, and to Cornell University Library. He had a strong love for antiquarian and genealogical pursuits, joining the New England Historic Genealogical Society in 1846, the year after its organization. He was a lecturer on temperance, and was President of the Massachusetts Temperance Union. He also was a singer, and even at the age of eighty-one, he joined the chorus of the National Peace Jubilee in Boston, in 1869.

He was totally blind for the last five or six years of his life. Alden died at his home in Randolph, on January 26, 1881, aged ninety-three.

== Selected works ==
Some of his writings have been digitized, including:

- The Early History of the Medical Profession in the County of Norfolk, Boston, 1853
- Memoir of Bartholomew Brown, Esquire, Randolph, 1862
- Medical uses of alcohol, 1870?
- Memorial of the Descendants of the Hon. John Alden, 1867
- An address, delivered in Hanover, N.H., before the Dartmouth Medical Society, on their first anniversary, Dec. 28th, 1819
- Historical Sketch of the Origin and Progress of the Massachusetts Medical Society, 1839.

Burrage, W.L. "Alden, Ebenezer" . American Medical Biographies . pp. 10–11.
