= New Money (album) =

Studio album by Walker Hayes
- Released: September 29, 2023
- Genre: Country pop
- Length: 22:17
- Label: Monument Nashville
- Producer: Dylan Guthro; Walker Hayes; Joe Thibodeau

Walker Hayes chronology
Country Stuff the Album (2022)	New Money (2023)	17 Problems (2025)

Singles from New Money
- 1. "Good with Me" Released: August 25, 2023

New Money is the fourth studio album by American country pop artist Walker Hayes. It was released on September 29, 2023, via Monument Records Nashville. The album includes the single "Good with Me", and the promotional singles "Stetson", and "Show Me the Country".

== Content ==
The album is Hayes's fourth overall, and his third for the Nashville label of Monument Records, to which he has been signed since 2016. It features eight total tracks, including the only track sent to country airplay, "Good With Me", which references many divisions within American society today.

== Release ==
New Money was preceded by three singles, two being promotional and one being released to country radio. In July 2023, Hayes released Strait Two Stepping, a two-song EP, featuring "Stetson" and "Show Me the Country". These songs were previously teased on his social media accounts. On August 25, 2023, Hayes released "Good with Me" to streaming and country radio. The album was officially released on September 29, 2023.

== Track listing ==
New Money track listing
No.	Title	Writer(s)	Producer(s)	Length
1.	"New Money"	Walker Hayes; Shane McAnally; Lori McKenna	Joe Thibodeau	3:01
2.	"Good with Me"	Hayes; McAnally; Scott Stepakoff	Thibodeau; Hayes	2:26
3.	"Accidentally Called Her You"	Hayes; Lauren Hungate; Jared Scott	Thibodeau	2:28
4.	"Fine as Hell"	Hayes; Josh Jenkins	Thibodeau	3:27
5.	"Stetson"	Hayes; Josh Dorr; Dylan Guthro	Thibodeau; Guthro	2:04
6.	"9"	Hayes; Jordan Gray; Guthro; Cole Taylor	Thibodeau; Guthro	3:01
7.	"Show Me the Country"	Guthro; Hayes; Josh Miller	Guthro	2:38
8.	"Taylor Swift"	Hayes; Mark Holman; Geoff Warburton	Thibodeau	3:21
Total length:				22:17

== Personnel ==
Credits adapted from Tidal.

- Walker Hayes – lead vocals (all tracks, acoustic guitar (tracks 1–4, 8), beatboxing (1, 3, 4)
- Joe Thibodeau – mixing (all tracks), synthesizer (1–4, 8), programming (1–3, 6, 8), bass (1, 5), drums (1–5, 8), keyboards (3, 8), strings (8)
- Joe LaPorta – mastering
- Adam Stark – electric guitar (1–4, 8), acoustic guitar (1, 2, 4, 8)
- Barry Bales – bass (2)
- Gordie Sampson – mandolin (5)
- Dylan Guthro – background vocals, drums, guitar, keyboards, programming, steel guitar, synthesizer (6)
- Loxley Hayes – background vocals (8)
