= Jonathan Belcher House =

Historic house in Massachusetts, United States

- U.S. National Register of Historic Places
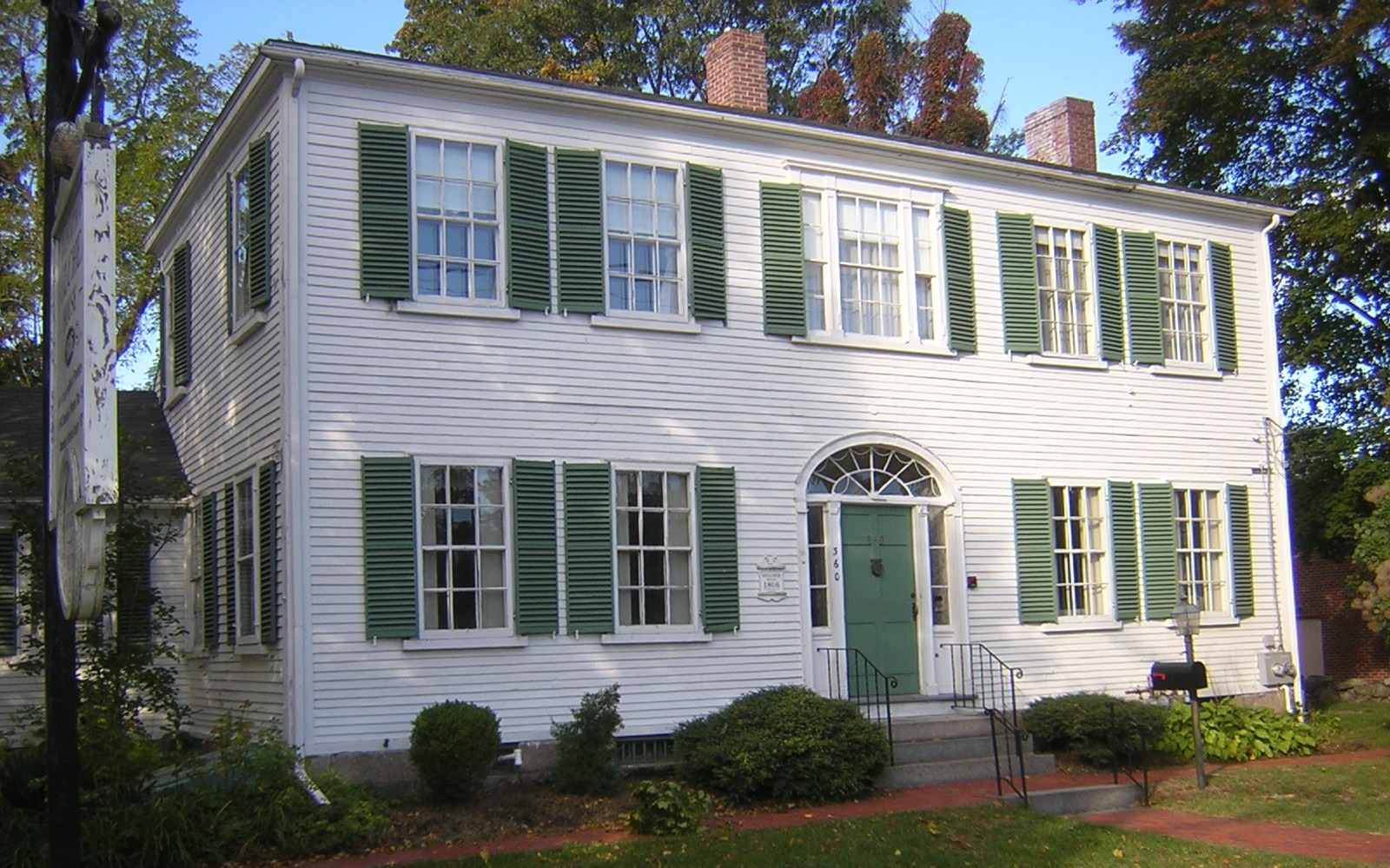

- Location within Massachusetts Location within the United States
- Location: 360 N. Main St., Randolph, Massachusetts
- Coordinates: 42°10′10″N 71°2′46″W
- Area: 0.8 acres (0.32 ha)
- Built: 1806
- Architect: Belcher, Jonathan
- Architectural style: Federal
- NRHP reference No.: 76000291
- Added to NRHP: April 30, 1976

The Jonathan Belcher House is a historic house located at 360 North Main Street in Randolph, Massachusetts.

The house was built in 1806 by Jonathan Belcher (1767–1839) and his wife Abigail (Thayer) who had been married on April 12, 1792. Their son, also named Jonathan, married Hannah (Jordan) and later added to the house. Jonathan and Hannah's granddaughter, Abigail Tower Tarbell, gave the house to The Ladies Library Association in 1911; the Association later changed its name to the Randolph Womens Club, whose home it is today. The house is used for weddings and other events and is occasionally open to the public.

It was added to the National Register of Historic Places on April 30, 1976.

== See also ==
- National Register of Historic Places listings in Norfolk County, Massachusetts
