= Love You More at Christmas Time =

2019 song by Kelly Rowland

Single by Kelly Rowland
- Released: November 22, 2019
- Genre: Christmas
- Length: 3:25
- Label: KTR
- Songwriters: Kelly Rowland; Nash Overstreet; Angela Beyincé; Shane Stevens
- Producer: Nash Overstreet

Kelly Rowland singles chronology
| "Get It" (2018) | "Love You More at Christmas Time" (2019) | "Coffee" (2020) |

"Love You More at Christmas Time" is a Christmas song by American singer Kelly Rowland. It was released on November 22, 2019 as a single to promote Merry Liddle Christmas, a holiday film in which Rowland stars in. The song was written by Rowland, Nash Overstreet, Angela Beyincé and Shane Stevens, while it was produced by Overstreet.

== Release and composition ==
Rowland first announced the song on Twitter, posting on November 15 that the song was available for pre-order and also shared a teaser via Instagram. "Love You More at Christmas Time" was then released the next week and became available on all platforms on November 22, 2019. It is the first original content and her third musical effort under the Christmas music genre overall as a soloist after her "Do You Hear What I Hear?" solo from the Destiny's Child album 8 Days of Christmas (in 2001) and her cover of "Wonderful Christmastime" for the soundtrack to A Madea Christmas (in 2013). Rowland co-wrote "Love You More at Christmas Time" with Nash Overstreet, Angela Beyince and Shane Stevens.

"Love You More at Christmas Time" runs for 3 minutes and 25 seconds. The song is a "mid-tempo" Christmas song featuring an upbeat acoustic guitar, jingle bells and lyrics about all the things that make the holidays special, including mistletoe and quality time with loved ones.

== Critical reception ==
Idolator's Mike Wass called it "cute, festive and loveable", and observed that "the seasonal bop has very genuine and rhythmic elements". Gil Kaufman from Billboard said that "Rowland imbues her new Christmas single with the spirit of Destiny Child's classic 8 Days of Christmas, swooningly delivering lines like 'Baby I believe in dreams/ And the joy the season brings/ You and me.'"

D-Money of Soul Bounce wrote: "The track has everything you'd expect from a Christmas song. Sleigh bells ring, snow and hot cocoa are mentioned, as is mistletoe and sitting with your boo by the fireside. However traditional the lyrics are, Kelly makes sure to keep things modern thanks to the slick R&B production. Guitar leads the way on the song, with warm bass, handclaps and finger snaps ushering in the soul of the season. Meanwhile, Kelly keeps things cozy with a mostly subdued vocal as the lyrics paint a vivid picture of holiday love."

== Live performances ==
Rowland performed the song live at the 2019 Macy's Thanksgiving Day Parade. She also performed the song live on CBS's A Home For The Holidays television special.

== Credits and personnel ==
Credits adapted from Tidal.

- Kelly Rowland – lead vocals, background vocals, songwriting
- Angela Beyincé – background vocals, songwriting
- Nash Overstreet – production, songwriting, mixing
- Shane Stevens – songwriting

== Release history ==
| Region | Date | Format | Label | Ref. |
|---|---|---|---|---|
| Worldwide | November 22, 2019 | Digital download; streaming | KTR | |
