= Boom (Walker Hayes album) =

boom.

Studio album by Walker Hayes
- Released: December 8, 2017
- Genre: Country pop; pop
- Length: 31:05
- Label: Monument
- Producer: Walker Hayes; Shane McAnally

Walker Hayes chronology
8Tracks (Vol. 2): Break the Internet (2016)	boom. (2017)	8Tracks (Vol. 3): Black Sheep (2019)

Singles from boom.
- 1. "You Broke Up with Me" Released: January 27, 2017; 2. "Craig Brogan" Released: April 23, 2018

Boom (stylized as boom.) is the second studio album by American country pop singer Walker Hayes. The album, containing 10 songs, was released on December 8, 2017.

== Background ==
The release date was announced by Hayes label in the first week of September 2017. The album's lead single, "You Broke Up with Me", was released on June 26, 2017. Hayes spoke of the album, he said "'Boom!' It's my favorite word. It's what I text my team every time another station adds 'You Broke Up With Me'... It's the first thing I say after I play a song from the album for anyone... So, it's what we had to call the album."

== Commercial performance ==
The album debuted at No. 6 on Billboard's Top Country Albums, with 12,300 copies sold. It has sold 32,600 copies in the United States as of May 2018.

== Track listing ==
Track listing adapted from Megacountry

No.	Title	Writer(s)	Length
1.	"Beautiful"	Walker Hayes	3:00
2.	"Shut Up Kenny"	Hayes; AJ Babcock; Pete Good	3:00
3.	"You Broke Up with Me"	Hayes; Thomas Archer; Kylie Sackley	3:16
4.	"Halloween" (featuring Nicolle Galyon)	Hayes; Nicolle Galyon	3:20
5.	"Dollar Store"	Hayes; Scott Stepakoff	3:17
6.	"Beer in the Fridge"	Hayes; Matt Jenkins; Shane McAnally; Scot Sherrod	2:27
7.	"Beckett"	Hayes; McAnally	2:55
8.	"Mind Candy"	Hayes; Archer	3:40
9.	"Prescriptions"	Hayes; Matt McGinn	3:00
10.	"Craig"	Hayes	3:10
Total length:			31:05

== Personnel ==
Adapted from AllMusic

- Dave Cohen - Hammond B-3 organ, keyboards, synthesizer
- Kris Donegan - acoustic guitar, electric guitar
- Fred Eltringham - drums, drum loops, percussion
- Paul Franklin - pedal steel guitar
- Nicolle Galyon - duet vocals on "Halloween"
- Ryan Gore - percussion, drum programming
- Walker Hayes - beat box, clapping, acoustic guitar, electric guitar, keyboards, drum loops, percussion, drum programming, synthesizer, synthesizer bass, lead vocals, background vocals, whistle
- Lee Hendricks - bass guitar
- Tony Lucido - bass guitar
- Matt McGinn - background vocals
- Justin Niebank - keyboards, drum programming
- Derek Wells - electric guitar

== Charts ==
=== Weekly charts ===
Chart (2017)	Peak position
US Billboard 200	37
US Top Country Albums (Billboard)	6

=== Year-end charts ===
Chart (2018)	Position
US Top Country Albums (Billboard)	56
