= U Gurl =

2021 single by Walker Hayes

Single by Walker Hayes

from the album Country Stuff the Album
- Released: October 15, 2021
- Genre: Country pop; country rap
- Length: 2:32
- Label: Monument Nashville
- Songwriters: Dylan Guthro; Jodi Guthro; Walker Hayes
- Producer: Dylan Guthro

Walker Hayes singles chronology
"Fancy Like" (2021)	"U Gurl" (2021)	"AA" (2021)

"U Gurl" is a song by American country music singer Walker Hayes. It was released on October 15, 2021 as the second single from his third studio album Country Stuff the Album. Hayes co-wrote the song with Dylan Guthro and Jodi Guthro, and it was produced by Dylan Guthro. Credits include T-Pain and Atlanta Records for sampling the song "Low" by Flo Rida.

== Content ==
The inspiration of "U Gurl" is Laney Beville Hayes; Hayes’ wife of 17 years. Hayes stated in a press release: "With 'U Gurl' we wanted to capture that feeling when you look at your significant other, and you just can't take your eyes off them, yet in a fresh way, I get that feeling every day when I look at my wife". He posted a dance video with his children on Instagram for the track.

== Charts ==
=== Weekly charts ===
Chart performance for "U Gurl"
Chart (2021)	Peak position
US Bubbling Under Hot 100 (Billboard)	8
US Hot Country Songs (Billboard)	28

=== Year-end charts ===
2022 year-end chart performance for "U Gurl"
Chart (2022)	Position
US Hot Country Songs (Billboard)	83
US Digital Song Sales (Billboard)	73

== Certifications ==
Certifications for U Gurl
Region	Certification	Certified units/sales
United States (RIAA)	Gold	500,000^{‡}
^{‡} Sales+streaming figures based on certification alone.
