= Gills Farm Archeological District =

Historic district in Massachusetts, United States

- U.S. National Register of Historic Places
- U.S. Historic district
- Location: Randolph, Massachusetts
- NRHP reference No.: 83004093
- Added to NRHP: October 24, 1983

Gills Farm Archeological District is a historic district in Randolph, Massachusetts. The district, located in a riverine environment, encompasses a collection of prehistoric archaeological sites dating from the Middle Archaic to the Woodland period. Middle Archaic components include evidence of Neville and Stark projectile points. The quantities of Late Archaic materials found in the area suggest a period of intensive occupation and use. These sites were used as tool workshops, where stone from nearby quarry sites was processed into finished objects, typically bifacial tool blades.

Archaeologist Frederick Carty donated nearly 6,000 artifacts from Gills Farm sites to the Robert S. Peabody Museum of Archaeology in Andover, Massachusetts, in 1995.

The district was added to the National Register of Historic Places in 1983.

== See also ==
- National Register of Historic Places listings in Norfolk County, Massachusetts
