= You Broke Up with Me =

Single by Walker Hayes

from the album boom.
- Released: January 27, 2017
- Genre: Country rap
- Length: 3:18
- Label: Monument Nashville
- Songwriters: Walker Hayes; Kylie Sackley; Thomas Archer
- Producer: Shane McAnally

Walker Hayes singles chronology
"Pimpin' Joy" (2014)	"You Broke Up with Me" (2017)	"Craig" (2018)

"You Broke Up with Me" is a song co-written and recorded by American country music singer Walker Hayes. It is his third chart entry overall, as well as his first entry on the Billboard Hot 100, and his first single for Monument Records Nashville. The song is included on his major-label debut album boom. The song was written by Hayes, Kylie Sackley and Thomas Archer.

== Content ==
The song is about a man who is confronted at a party by his ex-girlfriend, and rebuffs her by saying "you broke up with me". Hayes said that the song was inspired by his relationship with the Nashville music scene following a previously lost deal with Capitol Records, and telling those in the music industry that they "broke up" with him. Before recording the song on Monument, Hayes recorded an earlier version of the song on an EP released independently via Shane McAnally's SMACKSongs.

== Music video ==
The music video was directed by Blythe Thomas.

== Commercial performance ==
The song peaked at No. 9 on Hot Country Songs for charts dated February 17, 2018 where it stayed for 3 weeks. was certified Platinum by the RIAA on April 9, 2018. It has sold 397,000 copies in the United States as of March 2018.

== Charts ==
=== Weekly charts ===
Chart (2017–2018)	Peak position
Canada Hot 100 (Billboard)	100
Canada Country (Billboard)	17
US Billboard Hot 100	62
US Country Airplay (Billboard)	10
US Hot Country Songs (Billboard)	9

=== Year-end charts ===
Chart (2017)	Position
US Hot Country Songs (Billboard)	59
Chart (2018)	Position
US Hot Country Songs (Billboard)	48

== Certifications ==
Region	Certification	Certified units/sales
Canada (Music Canada)	Platinum	80,000^{‡}
United States (RIAA)	2× Platinum	2,000,000
^{‡} Sales+streaming figures based on certification alone.
