= Nickelodeon SlimeFest =

- Genre: Music festival
- Presented by: Luke Ryan; Wyatt Nixon Lloyd; Rahart Adams; Delta Goodrem
- Countries of origin: Australia; United States
- Original language: English
- No. of episodes: 4

Production
- Running time: 90 mins (including commercials)

Original release
- Network: Nickelodeon
- Release: 15 September 2012 – 9 June 2019

Related
- Nickelodeon Australian Kids' Choice Awards

Nickelodeon SlimeFest was an annual music and entertainment festival organized by the American children's network Nickelodeon. Originally held in Australia, other SlimeFest festivals were then held in various parts of the world, including the United States, which held its most recent edition in June 2019.

The event was set to return to the United States on 21–22 March 2020 at The Forum as a tie-in with the 2020 Kids' Choice Awards, however, the event was cancelled as a result of local health concerns about the international coronavirus pandemic.

== Hosts and Cities ==
Event	Date		Host	City	Venue
Event	Event	Aired	Host	City	Venue
1st Annual (2012)	15 September 2012	16 September 2012	Luke Ryan & Wyatt Nixon-Lloyd	Sydney	Hordern Pavilion
2nd Annual (2013)	27 September 2013	30 September 2013	Luke Ryan & Wyatt Nixon-Lloyd	Sydney	Sydney Olympic Park Sports Centre
3rd Annual (2014)	26 September 2014; 28 September 2014	29 September 2014	Luke Ryan & Wyatt Nixon-Lloyd	Sydney & Melbourne	Sydney Olympic Park Sports Centre & State Netball and Hockey Centre
4th Annual (2015)	25 September 2015; 27 September 2015	28 September 2015	Rahart Adams	Sydney & Melbourne	Sydney Olympic Park Sports Centre & State Netball and Hockey Centre
5th Annual (2016)	25 September 2016 (Melb); 30 September 2016 (Syd)	30 September 2016	Delta Goodrem	Sydney & Melbourne	Sydney Olympic Park Sports Centre & Margaret Court Arena
SlimeFest US (2018)	9–10 June 2018 (Chicago)			Chicago	Huntington Bank Pavilion
SlimeFest US (2019)	8–9 June 2019 (Chicago)			Chicago	Huntington Bank Pavilion
SlimeFest US (2020)	Cancelled (Los Angeles)	N/A	N/A	Los Angeles	The Forum

== SlimeFest Performances ==
=== SlimeFest 2012 ===
SlimeFest 2012 included performances by and appearances by:

==== Performers ====
- Jessica Mauboy
- Johnny Ruffo
- Reece Mastin
- Stan Walker
- Christina Parie

==== Appearances ====
- Steve "The Commando" Willis
- Richard Wilkins
- Charlotte Dawson
- Brian McFadden

=== SlimeFest 2013 ===
SlimeFest 2013 included performances by and appearances by:

==== Performers ====
- Big Time Rush
- Guy Sebastian
- Samantha Jade
- Justice Crew
- Heffron Drive
- Jadagrace

==== Appearances ====
- Steve "The Commando" Willis
- Reece Mastin
- Rhiannon Fish
- Mike Goldman
- Luke Jacobz
- Sam Moran
- Chris Sebastian

=== SlimeFest 2014 ===
SlimeFest 2014 included performances by and appearances by:

==== Performers ====
- Cody Simpson
- Sabrina Carpenter
- The Collective
- Savage
- Alli Simpson
- Justice Crew
- Ricki-Lee (Sydney)
- Dami Im (Melbourne)
- Timomatic (Cancelled)

==== Appearances ====
- The Voice Kids

=== SlimeFest 2015 ===
SlimeFest 2015 included performances by and appearances by:

==== Performers ====
- Boyce Avenue
- The Veronicas
- Samantha Jade
- At Sunset
- Reece Mastin
- Timmy Trumpet
- Savage

==== Appearances ====
- Cosentino

=== SlimeFest 2016 ===
SlimeFest 2016 included performances by:

==== Performers ====
- Delta Goodrem
- Omi
- Havana Brown
- G.R.L.
- In Stereo
- Mashd N Kutcher
- Megan Nicole
- Kian & JC (Cancelled)

=== SlimeFest U.S. 2018 ===
SlimeFest U.S. 2018 included performances by and appearances by:

==== Performers ====
- Zedd
- Liam Payne
- Flo Rida
- JoJo Siwa

==== Appearances ====
- Ella Anderson
- Riele Downs
- Benjamin Flores Jr.
- Kel Mitchell
- Owen Joyner
- Daniella Perkins
- Breanna Yde

=== SlimeFest U.S. 2019 ===
SlimeFest U.S. 2019 included performances by and appearances by:

==== Performers ====
- Pitbull
- Bebe Rexha
- JoJo Siwa
- T-Pain

==== Appearances ====
- Annie LeBlanc
- Scarlett Spencer
- Dallas Dupree Young
- Ella Anderson
- Riele Downs
- Owen Joyner
- Daniella Perkins

=== SlimeFest U.S. 2020 ===
SlimeFest U.S. 2020 was cancelled on 3 April 2020 due to the COVID-19 pandemic. This is what would have been the lineup:

==== Performers ====
- JoJo Siwa
- Why Don't We
- French Montana
- Blanco Brown
- Darci Lynne

==== Appearances ====
- Ryan Alessi
- Aria Brooks
- Reece Caddell
- Kate Godfrey
- Gabrielle Nevaeh Green
- Nathan Janak
- Lex Lumpkin
- Chinguun Sergelen
- Cooper Barnes
- Sean Ryan Fox
- Michael D. Cohen
- Young Dylan

== International ==
Following on from the success of Nickelodeon SlimeFest in Australia, the music festival has since been exported to several other countries with local performers and artists. SlimeFest events have taken place in Spain, Italy and the UK (September 2016). Nickelodeon announces its first Slimefest in Asia in August 2019. It was held at the Mall of Asia Concert Grounds in the Philippines on 28 September 2019.
