= Stetson (name) =

Stetson is a surname and given name. Notable people with the name include:

== Given name ==
- Stetson Allie (born 1991), American professional baseball pitcher
- Stetson Bennett (born 1998), American football player
- Stetson Kennedy (1916–2011), author and human rights activist
- Stetson Painter, Member of the Arkansas House of Representatives

== Surname ==
- John B. Stetson (1830–1906), manufacturer of the Stetson hat
- Augusta Emma Stetson (1842–1928), American Christian Science leader
- Beth Stetson, American economist
- Bill Stetson, American businessman, film producer, and environmental policy advisor
- Caleb Stetson (1801–1885), American businessman and politician
- Caleb Stetson (minister) (1793–1870), American minister
- Caleb Rochford Stetson (1871–1932), American minister
- Charles Stetson (1801–1863), politician
- Charles Walter Stetson (1858–1911), American artist
- Christine Stetson-Rawak Hill, American athletic director at the University of Delaware
- Colin Stetson (born 1975), American saxophonist and multireedist
- Dave Stetson (born 1946), co-creator and founding member of the Caricature Carvers of America
- Francis Lynde Stetson (1846–1920), American lawyer
- George Stetson (1814–1879), Christian pastor
- Glenn Stetson (1940–2003), Canadian singer, concert promoter, and television producer
- Harlan True Stetson (1885–1964), American astronomer and physicist
- Jane Watson Stetson, American political operative
- Jeff Stetson, American writer
- John C. Stetson (1920–2007), United States Secretary of the Air Force
- Kent Stetson (born 1948), Canadian playwright and member of the Order of Canada
- Lee Stetson, academic
- Lemuel Stetson (1804–1868), United States Representative from New York
- Mark Stetson (born 1952), visual effects artist
- Nahum Stetson (1807–1894), businessman
- Nancy Stetson, diplomat
- Raymond Herbert Stetson (died 1950), American speech scientist at Oberlin College
- Ricky Stetson, a 1982 child murder victim
- Robert Stetson Macfarlane (1899–?), president of Northern Pacific Railway 1951–1966
- Samuel "Drummer" Stetson, who built Stetson House c. 1694
- Steve Stetson (born 1951), head college football coach
- Thomas Stetson, who built Stetson–Ford House c. 1674
- Tony Stetson (born 1959), professional wrestler
- William H. Stetson (?–2019), Roman Catholic priest

== See also ==
- Stetson, a brand of hat
