= Stetson Hall =

- U.S. National Register of Historic Places
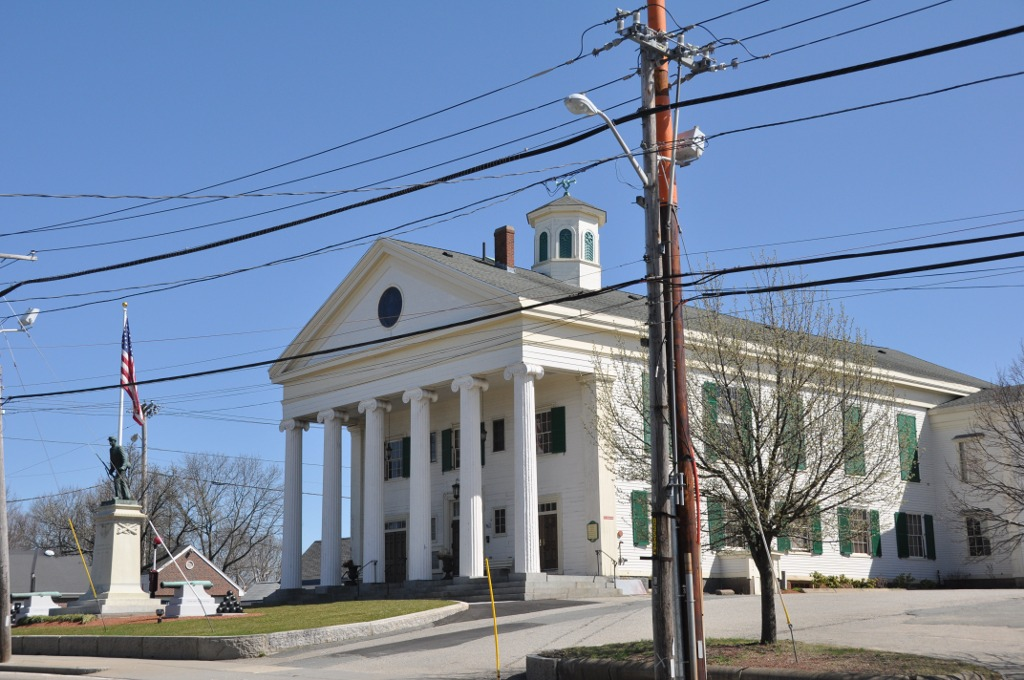

- Location within Massachusetts Location within the United States
- Location: 6 South Main Street, Randolph, Massachusetts
- Coordinates: 42°9′45″N 71°2′29″W
- Built: 1842
- Architectural style: Greek Revival
- NRHP reference No.: 11000883
- Added to NRHP: December 7, 2011

Stetson Hall is the former town hall of Randolph, Massachusetts, located at 6 South Main Street. The 2 1/2-story Greek Revival building, which was constructed in 1842, is the most monumental Greek Revival structure in the town, and occupies an elevated site in a prominent position at its center. Its temple front consists of six large fluted Ionic columns, two stories in height, supporting a triangular pedimental gable. Construction of the building was funded by Amasa Stetson, and has served as a center of civic activity in the town since it was built. Its early uses included an academy endowed by Stetson, and as home to the offices of Randolph National Bank. Its meeting space saw a variety of uses, including town meetings and religious services. The building also house town offices for most of its history; the town moved most of its offices out of the building in 1995 to allow for its restoration, which was not completed until 2009.

The building was listed on the National Register of Historic Places in 2011.

== See also ==
- National Register of Historic Places listings in Norfolk County, Massachusetts
