= Lynk (band) =

Australian pop rock band

- Origin: Adelaide, Australia
- Genres: Pop rock, pop punk
- Years active: 2012–2018
- Members: Harrison Kantarias; Andrew Kantarias; Matthew Kantarias
- Past members: Jae Curtis; Tom Jay Williams
- Website: Official website

Lynk, previously known as At Sunset were an Australian pop rock band currently consisting of brothers Harrison, Andrew and Matthew Kantarias. Past members include Jae Curtis and 2008 Australian Idol competitor Tom Jay Williams. The band currently reside in Adelaide, South Australia. They are best known as winners of the Nova FM Fresh Discovery and MTV (Australia and New Zealand) Brand New competitions.

== Music career ==
=== Formation and early years ===
At Sunset formed in January 2012 in Adelaide, when university friends Harrison Kantarias and Jae Curtis got together and started playing covers at their local pubs. During a rehearsal session, Harrison's brother Andrew joined in which led to the curation of At Sunset. The band began by performing covers and posting them to YouTube, which received significant social media attention, particularly for their cover of One Direction's One Thing. They also amassed over a million views for their cover of Justin Bieber's As Long As You Love Me.

When later asked the reasons for the name "At Sunset", Harrison Kantarias noted 'At Sunset' was decided upon because: "the name is a metaphor for our feeling towards music. We like to be upbeat, positive and really just enjoying life. Playing music, setting suns, beaches, pools, girls in bikinis... it doesn't get better than that, does it?"

In 2012, At Sunset released their first EP, 'Back in Time'. The EP was released digitally, with physical copies only being sold at live shows.

=== 2014-2016: Departure of Curtis and final releases as At Sunset ===
On 24 February 2014, Curtis announced via his YouTube channel that he was leaving the band. Following this news, on 26 March 2014 the band announced local Adelaide solo act Tom Jay Williams would be joining in Jae's place. Williams was formerly a contestant on Australian Idol in 2008. He was the youngest ever top ten finalist during an Australian Idol series.

Following Williams joining the band, 'Back in Time' was re-released on 23 April 2014 and featured on MTV "Buzzworthy". Their first cover video as a new band, 'Replay', received over 400,000 views in the first two weeks of uploading and was endorsed by the original artist Zendaya.

On 30 March 2015, At Sunset were announced the winner of Nova FM's Fresh Discovery, an Australian-wide search for unsigned talent, ahead of 1500 other acts. This win was followed by a mentoring session with Ed Sheeran and a recording deal with Warner Music Australasia for their debut single Every Little Thing, which was released on 10 April 2015.

Later in 2015, At Sunset were nominated for MTV (Australia and New Zealand)'s Brand New competition. After receiving more than 200,000 votes, At Sunset were announced the winner at an MTV special event at The Metro Theatre on 22 September 2015, ahead of runner up Conrad Sewell.

On 22 January 2016, At Sunset released their single Kiss Me.

=== 2016: Name change and formation of LYNK ===
On 30 June 2016, At Sunset announced on their social media accounts that they were disbanding, and LYNK was formed. Harrison and Andrew have continued together in this band with their younger brother Matthew Kantarias, however Tom has veered onto a solo pathway and is currently writing songs.

On 16 November 2016, LYNK released the first cover with the new name on their YouTube channel, a cover/mashup of 'Closer' by The Chainsmokers and Troye Sivan's 'Youth'.

=== 2017-present: Best Cover Ever series and first release as Lynk ===
In November 2017, Lynk appeared on the YouTube series Best Cover Ever. The same month, they also announced the release of the first song under the new band name, titled ‘Rude’, featuring American singer, songwriter and actress Elle Winter. The song was released on YouTube on 21 November 2017. An iTunes and Spotify release followed on 8 December 2017.

== Touring ==
In May 2012, At Sunset travelled to Singapore to perform at the Music Matters with Boyce Avenue.

In January 2013, At Sunset toured with Australian pop artist Reece Mastin. Following the Reece Mastin regional tour, At Sunset headlined the Teen Rush Australian Tour from 6–20 April 2013 with bands Titanium and Kristina. This tour played Adelaide, Brisbane, Melbourne and Sydney.

In May 2014, At Sunset undertook a promotional tour in the USA, consisting of performances in Los Angeles, Minneapolis, Philadelphia, and New York. The band did interviews with Ryan Seacrest, Tiger Beat, The Rhode Show, KIIS FM, KARE 11 News and KDWB.

At Sunset toured with Nickelodeon Slimefest in September 2015 to Melbourne and Sydney, alongside other acts such as Boyce Avenue and The Veronicas.

In January 2016, At Sunset toured Australia and New Zealand with American acts R5 and Jack & Jack. At the conclusion of this tour, At Sunset also opened for UK band The Vamps at their Wake Up World Tour in Sydney. This was held at Allphones Arena on 23 January 2016.

In February 2016, At Sunset toured in Manila, Philippines. They opened for Boyce Avenue at their arena show at the Smart Araneta Coliseum on 16 February 2016. As part of promotion for this show, At Sunset performed alongside Savannah Outen at a Valentine's Day event at SM Southmall on 14 February 2016.

Following their return from the Philippines, At Sunset conducted a headline tour of Australia to coincide with their new single, Kiss Me. The Kiss Me Tour toured to Adelaide, Sydney, Melbourne and Brisbane in March 2016.

In July 2016, Lynk travelled back to Manila, Philippines for the first time as the new line up to perform at the 'Own It' concert with other YouTube sensations. This took place at the Smart Araneta Coliseum, where they opened for Boyce Avenue back in February of that year when the band were still known as ‘At Sunset’, and the announcement that they would perform at this concert was made before the band was renamed. They also performed at the SM Southmall again with a few other 'Own It' performers.

In late October 2016, it was announced that Lynk would be opening for Shawn Mendes at his debut Australian shows in Sydney. These shows took place at the Enmore Theatre on 1 and 2 November 2016.

== Members ==
=== Current members ===
- Harrison Kantarias - vocals, lead guitar
- Andrew Kantarias - vocals, keyboards and piano
- Matthew Kantarias - vocals, bass guitar

=== Former members ===
- Jae Curtis
- Tom J Williams - vocals, rhythm guitar

== Discography ==
=== Extended plays ===
- 2012: Back in Time EP

=== Singles ===
- 2012: Back in Time
- 2012: This is Who I Am
- 2013: Rush
- 2014: Back in Time (re-released)
- 2014: Us Against the World
- 2015: Every Little Thing
- 2016: Kiss Me
- 2017: Rude (featuring Elle Winter)

== Awards and nominations ==
Year	Award	Category	Nominee	Result	Ref.
2015	Nova FM Fresh Discovery	Fresh Discovery	Themselves	Won	
2015	MTV Australia & New Zealand Brand New	Brand New	Themselves	Won	
2016	Nickelodeon Kids' Choice Awards	Favourite Pop Sensation AU/NZ	Themselves	Nominated	
