= Stetson Pond (Pembroke, Massachusetts) =

Lake of the United States of America

- Location within Massachusetts Location within the United States
- Location: Pembroke, Massachusetts
- Coordinates: 42°01′45″N 70°49′40″W
- Basin countries: United States
- Surface area: 93 acres (38 ha)
- Average depth: 15 ft (4.6 m)
- Max. depth: 33 ft (10 m)

Stetson Pond is a 93-acre (380,000 m^{2}) warm water pond in Pembroke, Massachusetts. The average depth is 15 feet (4.6 m) and the maximum depth is 33 feet (10 m). The pond is characterized by brown water with a transparency of five feet. Access to the pond is provided by a dirt launch located off Plymouth Street, near Route 36. The launch is suitable for car top boats and canoes and is owned by the Town of Pembroke.
