= AA (song) =

2021 single by Walker Hayes

Single by Walker Hayes

from the album Country Stuff the Album
- Released: November 19, 2021
- Genre: Country pop
- Length: 3:09
- Label: Monument Nashville
- Songwriters: Shane McAnally; Luke Laird; Walker Hayes
- Producers: Walker Hayes; Shane McAnally; Joe Thibodeau

Walker Hayes singles chronology
"U Gurl" (2021)	"AA" (2021)	"Y'all Life" (2022)

Music video
- "AA" on YouTube

"AA" is a song by American country music singer Walker Hayes. It was released on November 19, 2021 as the third single from his third studio album Country Stuff the Album. Hayes and Shane McAnally co-wrote the song with Luke Laird, and co-produced it with Joe Thibodeau.

== Content ==
"AA" is a song that conveys Hayes' anxiety as a dad and his love for wife, as well as his sobriety. In a press release, he said: "I've struggled with alcohol abuse and sometimes I wish I didn't need AA, but I do. I think a lot of people can relate to that". In an interview with Celebsecrets, Hayes called it "A Dad-Anthem". Chris Parton of Sounds Like Nashville described the song as a "chasing his dreams while juggling fatherhood, marriage and his all-too relatable vices".

== Charts ==
=== Weekly charts ===
Weekly chart performance for "AA"
Chart (2021–2022)	Peak position
Canada Hot 100 (Billboard)	42
Canada Country (Billboard)	1
Global 200 (Billboard)	125
US Billboard Hot 100	28
US Country Airplay (Billboard)	5
US Hot Country Songs (Billboard)	3

=== Year-end charts ===
2022 year-end chart performance for "AA"
Chart (2022)	Position
US Billboard Hot 100	61
US Country Airplay (Billboard)	38
US Hot Country Songs (Billboard)	10

== Certifications ==
Certifications for "AA"
Region	Certification	Certified units/sales
United States (RIAA)	2× Platinum	2,000,000^{‡}
^{‡} Sales+streaming figures based on certification alone.

== Release history ==
Release history for "AA"
Region	Date	Format	Label	Ref.
Various	November 19, 2021	Digital download; streaming	Monument Nashville	
United States	December 6, 2021	Country radio	Monument Nashville	
