= Country Stuff =

EP by Walker Hayes
- Released: June 4, 2021
- Genre: Country; country pop
- Length: 18:26
- Label: Monument
- Producer: Tofer Brown (track 5); Walker Hayes (all tracks except 3 and 5); Shane McAnally (all tracks); Nash Overstreet (all tracks 1 and 2); Joe Thibodeau (tracks 1, 2)

Walker Hayes chronology
| 8Tracks (Vol. 3): Black Sheep (2019) | Country Stuff (2021) | Country Stuff the Album (2022) |

Singles from Country Stuff
- 1. "Fancy Like" Released: August 2, 2021

Country Stuff is the fifth EP by American country music singer Walker Hayes, released on June 4, 2021, through Monument Records. It was produced by Shane McAnally, Joel Thibodeau, and Hayes. The EP includes the single "Fancy Like", which hit number one on the Billboard Hot Country Songs chart.

The set debuted at number 26 on Top Country Albums with 7,000 units sold in its first week. It later on rose to its peak at number 4 on the chart.

== Critical reception ==
Florian Buechting of Flyctory.com gave the album a rating of 3.5 out of 5 and said "Country Stuff is rather average. The title track is great, but there are too many weaker songs on this EP as well. The lyrics are typically not too bad – but this unique cheeky, ironic touch in Walker Hayes’ tracks feels to be faded. Bad luck, I loved it." Nicole Piering of Country Swag gave the EP a generally positive review, writing: "As a singer-rapper, Walker Hayes fills a certain niche with undeniably catchy songs like "Country Stuff" and "Fancy Like." However, he truly shines on deeper material, as evidenced on tracks like "Briefcase" and "Make You Cry." The Country Stuff EP allows Hayes to flex both sides of his personality, and there's something for everyone here".

== Track listing ==
All tracks are written by Walker Hayes, with additional co-writers as noted.

Country Stuff track listing
| No. | Title | Writer(s) | Length |
|---|---|---|---|
| 1. | "Country Stuff" (featuring Jake Owen) | Joe Thibodeau; Adam Stark | 2:34 |
| 2. | "Fancy Like" | Cameron Bartolini; Joshua Jenkins; Shane Stevens | 2:41 |
| 3. | "Make You Cry" | Nash Overstreet; Shane Stevens | 3:09 |
| 4. | "I Hope You Miss Me" | Shane McAnally; Sam Summer; Nick Ruth; Sean Smalls | 3:23 |
| 5. | "What If We Did" (featuring Carly Pearce) | Emily Falvey; Tofer Brown | 3:11 |
| 6. | "Briefcase" (featuring Lori McKenna) | McKenna | 3:28 |
| Total length: | | | 18:26 |

== Charts ==
=== Weekly charts ===
Weekly chart performance for Country Stuff
| Chart (2021) | Peak position |
|---|---|
| Canadian Albums (Billboard) | 41 |
| US Billboard 200 | 32 |
| US Top Country Albums (Billboard) | 4 |

=== Year-end charts ===
2021 year-end chart performance for Country Stuff
| Chart (2021) | Position |
|---|---|
| US Billboard 200 | 176 |
| US Top Country Albums (Billboard) | 32 |

2022 year-end chart performance for Country Stuff
| Chart (2022) | Position |
|---|---|
| US Top Country Albums (Billboard) | 59 |
