= Randolph High School (Massachusetts) =

Location
- 70 Memorial Parkway; Randolph, Massachusetts; United States
- Coordinates: 42.1624°N 71.0450°W

Information
- Type: Public; Open enrollment
- Principal: John S Licorish
- Staff: 51.90 (FTE)
- Grades: 9–12
- Enrollment: 664 (2023–24)
  - Grade 9: 218
  - Grade 10: 201
  - Grade 11: 195
  - Grade 12: 150
  - Other: 1
- Student to teacher ratio: 11.60
- Colors: Royal Blue, Black & White
- Mascot: Blue Devil
- Website: www.randolph.k12.ma.us/schools/randolph-high-school/index

Randolph High School is High School, located in Randolph, Massachusetts, United States, that teaches students in grades 9 through 12.

== Athletics ==
Randolph High School is an independent member of the Massachusetts Interscholastic Athletic Association. The Blue Devils are a member of the South Shore League.

In 2021, the football team made a Cinderella run in the playoffs and won their first state championship in school history, defeating league rival Hull in the state finals by a score of 20-14. In 2024, the football team made it to the state championship game, but were defeated by West Boylston, 22-16. In 2025, the football team won their first league championship and once again advanced to the state championship game, where they avenged and defeated 3-time defending state champion, West Boylston, by a score of 21-0. The win also capped the first undefeated season in school history in football.

The Boys basketball team won their first ever state championship in 2022.

In the fall, the school offers: Boys and Girls Cross Country, Boys and Girls Soccer, Girls Volleyball, and Football. In the winter the athletics options are: Boys and Girls Swimming, Boys and Girls Track and Field, Wrestling, and Boys and Girls Basketball. The school offers for the spring: Boys and Girls Tennis, Boys and Girls Track and Field, Boys Volleyball, Boys Baseball, and Girls Softball.

== Extracirriculars ==
Randolph High School hosts various extracurricular activities including a marching band, named the RHS Marching Blue Devils. In 2014, they began competing in competitions of the New England Scholastic Band Association (NESBA), after a 21-year break. The RHS Marching Blue Devils took home the gold medal in the NESBA Championships every year from 2014 through 2017.

Randolph High School is also home to performing arts clubs such as African Stepping club, Drama club, performing various shows such as The Addams Family in 2022, Beauty and the Beast in 2023, and High School Musical on Stage! in 2024.

Randolph High School hosts Asian culture club, a club designed to bring exposure to Asian culture to a diverse audience through means such as performing arts and special events.
