= Fancy Like =

2021 single by Walker Hayes

- Cover art for the Kesha remix

Single by Walker Hayes (solo or featuring Kesha)

from the EP Country Stuff and the album Country Stuff the Album
- Released: August 2, 2021
- Genre: Country pop; country rap
- Length: 2:41
- Label: Monument Nashville
- Songwriters: Walker Hayes; Kesha Sebert (remix only); Cameron Bartolini; Josh Jenkins; Shane Stevens
- Producers: Walker Hayes; Joe Thibodeau; Shane McAnally

Walker Hayes singles chronology
"Trash My Heart" (2020)	"Fancy Like" (2021)	"U Gurl" (2021)

Kesha singles chronology
"Stronger" (2021)	"Fancy Like" (2021)	"Drop Dead" (2021)

Music videos
- "Fancy Like" on YouTube; "Fancy Like" (Remix) Feat Kesha on YouTube

"Fancy Like" is a song recorded by American country music singer Walker Hayes. It was released on August 2, 2021, from his fifth EP Country Stuff via Monument Records Nashville. Hayes co-wrote the song with Cameron Bartolini, Josh Jenkins, and Shane Stevens, and co-produced it with Joe Thibodeau and Shane McAnally. A remix featuring guest vocals from American singer-songwriter Kesha was released on September 10, 2021.

== Background ==
During the COVID-19 pandemic, Hayes and his family decided to make TikTok videos for fun, creating dances for several songs from his EP Country Stuff for his children, including "Country Stuff" and "I Hope You Miss Me". The TikTok video for "Fancy Like" has received more than 2.4 million likes and 23,000 comments, and became a popular meme which led to the song becoming a viral hit.

In an interview with CMT, he said: "It's nice to know when you put out something that honestly, I just wrote about my family. There's no pretentiousness there. It's just who we are. When you get to be that honest and the public reacts, it's a real magical thing. And the dances, that's just me being a dad. I mean, that's just how we roll around here."

== Music videos ==
The song received two music video releases. The original version, depicting Hayes singing the song around a house and meadow, was released on June 4, 2021. The remix version with Kesha was released on October 7, 2021, and directed by Rehman Ali. The video was filmed In Los Angeles. It features Hayes and Kesha "in a 'Fancy Like' world of their own – tailgating, skateboarding, and dancing through the streets of LA."

== Track listings ==
Digital download and streaming (remix featuring Kesha and original)

1. "Fancy Like" (featuring Kesha) – 2:41
2. "Fancy Like" – 2:41

Digital download and streaming (Dave Audé remix)

1. "Fancy Like" (Dave Audé remix) – 2:57

== Commercial performance ==
After Hayes posted a series of videos on TikTok with his children, the song sold 10,300 copies in the week ending June 17, 2021. It reached number three on the US Billboard Hot 100 and number one on the Hot Country Songs chart, becoming Hayes' first top 10 and highest-charting single to date. On August 9, 2021, the track was certified Gold by the RIAA and platinum on September 7, 2021.

In response to the song's popularity, Applebee's brought back its Oreo Cookie Shake, which was mentioned in the song and had been discontinued in the wake of the COVID-19 pandemic. The chain used the song in commercials starting August 23, 2021.

In 2024, Hayes released Fancy Like Christmas, which uses the same melody.

== Charts ==
=== Weekly charts ===
Weekly chart performance for "Fancy Like"
Chart (2021)	Peak position
Australia (ARIA)	42
Canada Hot 100 (Billboard)	9
Canada AC (Billboard)	46
Canada Country (Billboard)	3
Canada CHR/Top 40 (Billboard)	25
Canada Hot AC (Billboard)	20
Global 200 (Billboard)	25
New Zealand Hot Singles (RMNZ)	16
US Billboard Hot 100	3
US Adult Contemporary (Billboard)	16
US Adult Pop Airplay (Billboard)	9
US Country Airplay (Billboard)	1
US Hot Country Songs (Billboard)	1
US Pop Airplay (Billboard)	14

=== Year-end charts ===
2021 year-end chart performance for "Fancy Like"
Chart (2021)	Position
Canada (Canadian Hot 100)	41
Global 200 (Billboard)	107
US Billboard Hot 100	27
US Adult Top 40 (Billboard)	50
US Country Airplay (Billboard)	50
US Hot Country Songs (Billboard)	2

2022 year-end chart performance for "Fancy Like"
Chart (2022)	Position
Canada (Canadian Hot 100)	90
Global 200 (Billboard)	172
US Billboard Hot 100	35
US Hot Country Songs (Billboard)	4

== Certifications ==
Certifications for "Fancy Like"
Region	Certification	Certified units/sales
Australia (ARIA)	Platinum	70,000^{‡}
Canada (Music Canada)	3× Platinum	240,000^{‡}
New Zealand (RMNZ)	2× Platinum	60,000^{‡}
United Kingdom (BPI)	Silver	200,000^{‡}
United States (RIAA)	7× Platinum	7,000,000^{‡}
^{‡} Sales+streaming figures based on certification alone.

== Release history ==
Release history and formats for "Fancy Like"
Region	Date	Format	Version	Label	Ref.
United States	August 2, 2021	Country radio	Original	Monument Nashville	
United States	August 30, 2021	Adult contemporary radio	Original	Monument Nashville	
United States	August 31, 2021	Contemporary hit radio	Original	Monument Nashville	
Various	September 10, 2021	Digital download; streaming	Kesha remix	Monument Nashville	
