= Walker Hayes =

American country musician (born 1979)

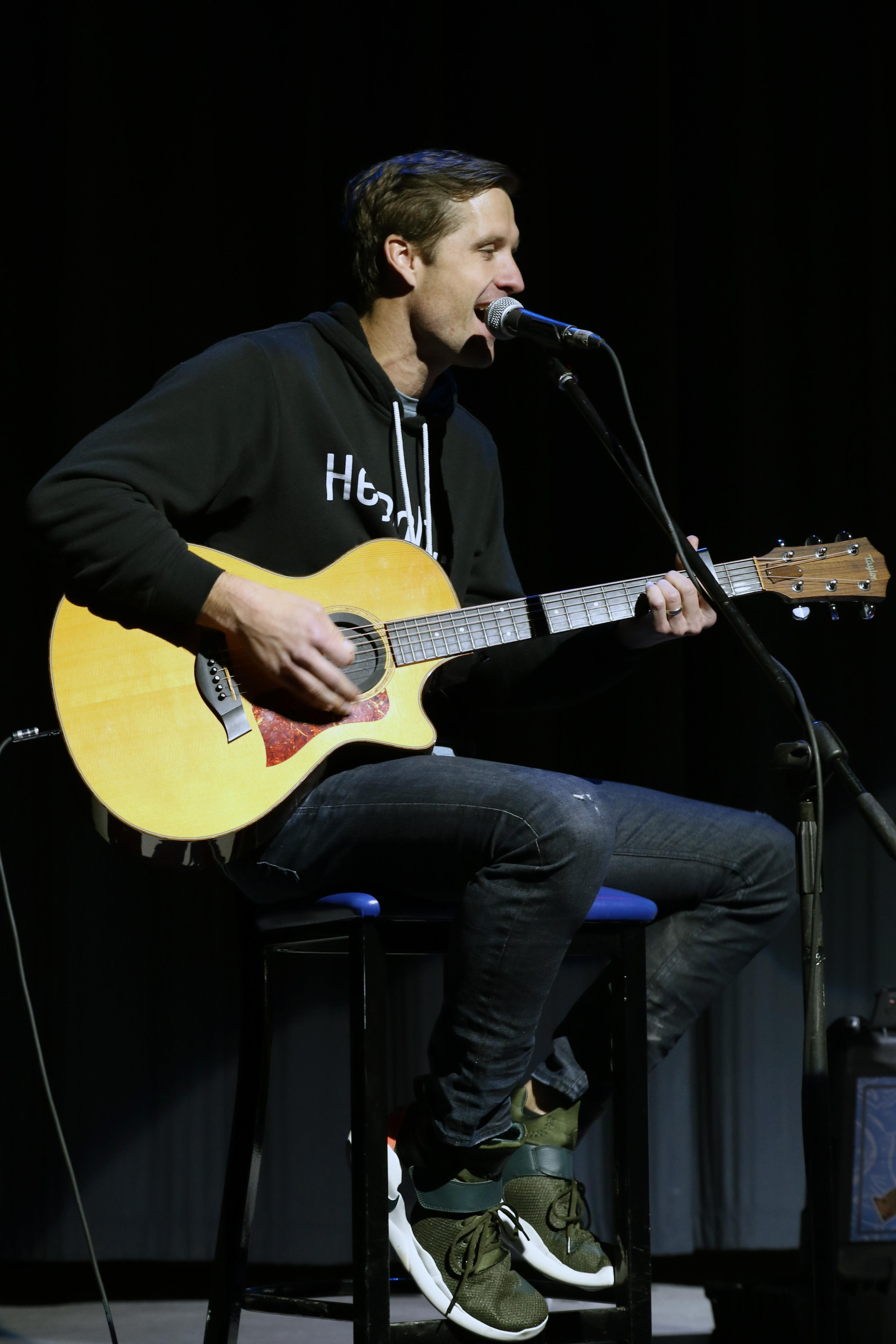
- Hayes in 2017

Background information
- Born: Charles Edgar Walker Hayes; December 27, 1979 (age 46)
- Origin: Mobile, Alabama, U.S.
- Genre: Country pop
- Occupations: Singer; songwriter
- Instruments: Vocals; guitar; piano
- Years active: 2010–present
- Labels: Capitol; Monument
- Spouse: Laney Beville (m. 2004)
- Website: www.walkerhayes.com

Charles Edgar Walker Hayes (born December 27, 1979) is an American country pop singer and songwriter. He has released five studio albums: Reason to Rhyme in 2011 on Capitol Records Nashville, and Boom (2017), Country Stuff the Album (2022), New Money (2023), and 17 Problems (2025), on RCA Records. Hayes has charted multiple singles on the Billboard Hot Country Songs and Country Airplay charts; his highest-peaking is "Fancy Like", which reached the number one position on both charts between late 2021 and early 2022.

== Early life ==
Hayes was born on December 27, 1979, in Mobile, Alabama. He has eight older half-siblings, four from his mother's previous marriage and four from his father's previous marriage. His father, Charles Hayes, was a realtor and died in 2021. Hayes attended St. Paul's Episcopal School in Mobile and then graduated from Birmingham–Southern College in 2002 with a bachelor's degree in music and an emphasis on piano.

== Career ==
=== 2005–2015: Beginnings ===
Hayes and his wife moved to Nashville in 2005, hoping to get in the country music business. He landed a job writing songs for a Nashville publishing company and then signed a contract with Mercury Records Nashville, though he was quickly dropped and moved to Capitol Records Nashville. In 2010, he released his first single, "Pants". It debuted at No. 60 on the Hot Country Songs charts dated for the week ending September 18, 2010. Kyle Ward of Roughstock rated the single 3.5 stars out of 5. Hayes debuted the video for the song in December 2010. Hayes also appeared on an episode of 19 Kids and Counting, singing a song he wrote about Jill and her now husband, Derick's, proposal. "Pants" and a second single, "Why Wait for Summer", both appeared on an album for Capitol Records titled Reason to Rhyme.

Hayes co-wrote and sang guest vocals on "Dirty Side", a song from Colt Ford's 2014 album Thanks for Listening. He also co-wrote Rodney Atkins' late-2014 single "Eat Sleep Love You Repeat". After losing his contract with Capitol Records, Hayes worked at a Costco to support himself.

=== 2016–2020: 8Tracks Vol. 1 and 8Tracks Vol. 2 ===
In 2016, Hayes signed a publishing and production deal with Shane McAnally and SMACK/RareSpark, through which he released two extended plays: 8Tracks Vol. 1 and 8Tracks Vol. 2. This was followed by his first single for Monument Records, "You Broke Up with Me". It appears on his first Monument album, Boom. It would be his breakthrough hit on the Billboard charts.

In August 2018, Hayes released a single titled "90's Country", whose song lyrics contain multiple references to titles of country songs from the 1990s.

=== 2021–2024: Country Stuff the Album and New Money ===
On June 4, 2021, Hayes released the EP Country Stuff. One of its tracks, "Fancy Like", became a viral hit through TikTok and reached number 3 on the US Billboard Hot 100 and number 1 on the Hot Country Songs chart, becoming Hayes' highest-charting effort to date. It was subsequently released to country radio as his next single, and debuted at number 53 on the Billboard Country Airplay chart. "Fancy Like" appeared on an extended play titled Country Stuff, the tracks of which also carried over to his third studio album, 2022's Country Stuff the Album. The album has also produced the singles "U Gurl" and "AA".

In July 2022, Hayes released the single "Y'all Life".

On July 28, 2023, Hayes released Strait Two Stepping, a two song extended play including the songs "Stetson" and "Show Me the Country". These songs later appeared on his fourth studio album New Money, along with the single, "Good with Me", which released on August 25, 2023. The album was released a month later on September 29, 2023.

In July 2024, Hayes teamed up with Canadian rapper Connor Price on the song, "Smoke". It was met with negative reviews and was described as "one of the worst songs ever made." On August 16, 2024, Hayes released "Ball Player", a song intended as an "apology to his kids" about his feelings towards their athletic careers.

On October 11, 2024, Hayes released “5 to 9”, describing the song as “bigger than Fancy Like”.

=== 2025–present: 17 Problems ===
On July 25, 2025, Hayes released "17 Year Old Problems", his first new music of 2025. A few days later on July 28, Hayes announced his fifth studio album, 17 Problems, which released on August 22, 2025. Through country storytelling blended with hip-hop production, the album explores themes of fatherhood, faith, and grief. Hayes calls "Song For My Son," a collaboration with country artist Kane Brown, the "most meaningful track on [the] album." The song is sung from the perspective of a father praying he doesn't pass his old addictions and struggles down to his child.

On October 17, 2025, Hayes embarked on the 18 date "Walker Hayes: Unplugged" tour to support "17 Problems." Stripping back the production and featuring acoustic accompaniment from his son, Baylor, and daughter, Loxley, Hayes outlined the story of his musical and personal life in chronological order through songs spanning his entire career.

On November 20, 2025, Deadline announced that Hayes would appear in a Netflix film adaptation of Katherine Center's novel The Bodyguard though it was renamed Guarding Stars to avoid confusion with the 1992 film. The movie was initially released on November 18, 2026 on Netflix.

== Personal life ==
He lives in Estill Springs, Tennessee, with his wife, Laney Beville Hayes, and their six children. The couple married in 2004. Their seventh child and fourth daughter, Oakleigh Klover Hayes, died shortly after birth on June 6, 2018. Laney had to undergo surgery due to profuse bleeding after the birth. Hayes is a Christian and has been sober since 2015.

== Discography ==
Studio albums

- Reason to Rhyme (2011)
- Boom (2017)
- Country Stuff the Album (2022)
- New Money (2023)
- 17 Problems (2025)

== Awards and nominations ==
Awards and nominations received by Kevin Feige
| Award | Year | Nominee | Category | Result | Ref. |
|---|---|---|---|---|---|
| CMT Music Awards | 2018 | "You Broke Up with Me" | Breakthrough Video of the Year | Nominated | |
| American Music Awards | 2021 | "Fancy Like" | Favorite Country Song | Nominated | |
| Grammy Awards | 2022 | "Fancy Like" | Best Country Song | Nominated | |
| Kids' Choice Awards | 2022 | Himself | Favorite Breakout Artist | Nominated | |
| Billboard Music Awards | 2022 | Himself | Top Song Sales Artist | Nominated | |
| Billboard Music Awards | 2022 | Himself | Top Country Artist | Nominated | |
| Billboard Music Awards | 2022 | Country Stuff the Album | Top Country Album | Nominated | |
| Billboard Music Awards | 2022 | "Fancy Like" | Top Selling Song | Nominated | |
| Billboard Music Awards | 2022 | "Fancy Like" | Top Viral Song | Nominated | |
| Billboard Music Awards | 2022 | "Fancy Like" | Top Country Song | Won | |
