= Monument Records =

American record label

- Parent company: Sony Music Entertainment
- Founded: 1958; 68 years ago
- Founder: Fred Foster; Buddy Deane; Jack Kirby
- Genre: Various
- Country of origin: U.S.
- Official website: monument-records.com

Monument Records is an American record label co-founded in 1958 by Fred Foster. Originally founded in Washington, D.C., the label moved to Nashville in 1960, and experienced success over the next two decades with a number of artists including Roy Orbison, Dolly Parton, Willie Nelson, Ray Stevens, Kris Kristofferson, Larry Gatlin, Charlie McCoy, Boots Randolph, Jeannie Seely, and others.

After financial struggles and bankruptcy, CBS Records acquired the Monument catalog in the 1980s. CBS successor Sony Music reactivated the label in 1997 as a country label and relaunched it in 2017.

== History ==
After working in record promotions for several years, in March 1958 Fred Foster co-founded Monument Records and publishing company Combine Music with business manager Jack Kirby and well-known Baltimore disc jockey "Buddy" Deane. Founded in Washington, D.C., the label's name was inspired by the Washington Monument.

For the label's first release, Foster took Billy Grammer to RCA's Nashville studio to record "Gotta Travel On" with Chet Atkins. Having spent all but $80 of Monument's initial $1,200 of funding, Foster negotiated for Monument to be the first label distributed by London Records. Grammer's single, released in October 1958, was a crossover hit, reaching #4 on the U.S. pop chart, #5 on the U.S. country chart, and #14 on the U.S. R&B chart in 1959, selling over 900,000 copies. It also spawned a nationwide dance craze called "The Shag". Later in 1959, Monument co-founder "Buddy" Dean sold his 30% share of the company back to Foster before moving to Pine Bluff, Arkansas. He bought KOTN, a radio station, in the early '60s.

In early 1959, Wesley Rose, Roy Orbison's manager and the president of Acuff-Rose, approached Foster about signing the singer to Monument Records, and Foster said yes. As Orbison began recording for the label, his signature sound was realized, leading to a string of 18 hit singles and five best-selling LPs, beginning with the 1960 release "Only the Lonely." Also in 1960, recognizing he was spending more than half of his time in Nashville for recording sessions with Monument artists, Foster moved Monument Records and Combine Music Hendersonville. By 1961, London Records' roster of labels the company was distributing had grown to more than forty independents, prompting Foster to move Monument to the independent-distributor network.

1963 Monument Records single label

In addition to Orbison, Monument became home to a number of other artists including The Velvets, Bob Moore, Boots Randolph, Charlie McCoy, Tony Joe White, Ray Stevens, Kris Kristofferson, Larry Jon Wilson, Larry Gatlin, and Robert Mitchum. Willie Nelson, Tommy Roe, Connie Smith were also signed to Monument for short times. The label was responsible for developing a number of artists including Jeannie Seely, Dolly Parton, and Grandpa Jones. In 1962, Monument Records made history when it released "Too Many Chicks" and "Jealous Heart" by Leona Douglas, the first country & western recording by an African-American woman.

Foster started a soul and R&B label Sound Stage 7 in 1963. Artists on Sound Stage 7 included Joe Simon, The Dixiebelles, Arthur Alexander, and Ivory Joe Hunter. Another Monument sublabel was Rising Sons Records. In 1971, Foster signed a worldwide distribution agreement with CBS Records. The distribution agreement lasted until 1976. Foster switched distribution to PolyGram which lasted until 1982, and then CBS handled distribution again until 1990.

Fred Foster invested heavily in a banking venture in the 1980s, and sustained disastrous financial losses, which led to Monument filing for Chapter 11 bankruptcy in 1983 and the sale of its publishing counterpart, Combine Music, to Entertainment Music Co. in 1985. CBS Records acquired the Monument catalog, and its successor company, Sony Music, reactivated the label in 1997 as a country label. Some successful artists signed to Monument during this era were Little Big Town and Dixie Chicks. Monument Records catalog is managed by Sony Music's Legacy Recordings unit.

== 2017 relaunch ==
In January 2017, Sony Music announced that it had revived the Monument label in a joint venture with Sandbox Entertainment CEO and manager Jason Owen and songwriter/producer Shane McAnally. Owen and McAnally serve as co-presidents and have signed artists Caitlyn Smith, Walker Hayes, and Tigirlily Gold.

== See also ==
- List of record labels
- Sony Nashville
