= Jana Kramer discography =

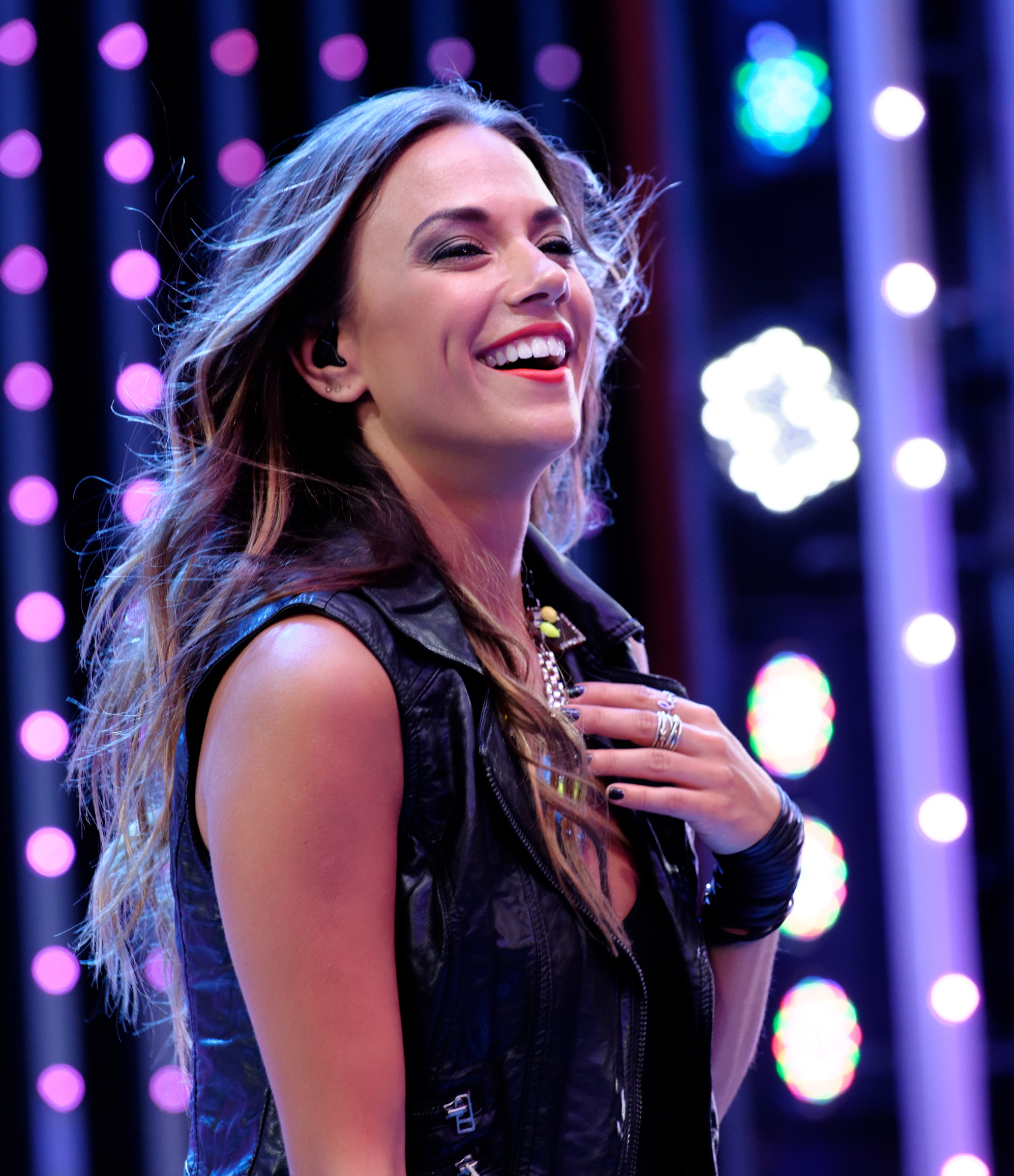
- Jana Kramer live in concert, 2014.
- Studio albums: 2
- Singles: 13
- Music videos: 10
- Promotional singles: 3
- Other appearances: 2

The discography of American country music artist Jana Kramer consists of two studio albums, 13 singles, three promotional singles, 10 music videos, and two album appearances. Kramer began her early career as a television actress, appearing in various soap operas and syndicated shows. In 2011, she signed a recording contract following the exposure of a recurring role on the television series One Tree Hill.

Kramer's self-titled studio album was released in June 2012 on Elektra Records Nashville. The album debuted at number 19 on the Billboard 200 and number five on the Top Country Albums chart. "Why Ya Wanna" was the project's lead single, becoming her first major hit as a musical artist. The song peaked at number three on the Billboard Hot Country Songs chart and the top 50 of the Billboard Hot 100, certifying Platinum by the Recording Industry Association of America as well. "Whiskey" and "I Hope It Rains" were the next singles respectfully spawned from the album, both reaching minor positions on the Billboard country songs chart.

Her next single was released in May 2014 entitled "Love". Reaching the top 40 of the Hot Country Songs chart, the song promoted the release of her second studio album. Due to the song's lack of success, the album's release date was delayed in 2014. "I Got the Boy" was issued as Kramer's next single in January 2015 and was co-written by Jamie Lynn Spears. Her second studio album Thirty-One was officially released in October 2015, debuting at number 10 on the Billboard 200 and number three on the Top Country Albums chart.

== Albums ==
=== Studio albums ===
List of albums, with selected chart positions and sales, showing other relevant details
Title	Album details	Peak chart positions		Sales
Title	Album details	US Country	US	Sales
Jana Kramer	Released: June 5, 2012; Label: Elektra Nashville; Formats: CD, music download	5	19	US: 185,000
Thirty One	Released: October 9, 2015; Label: Warner Music Nashville; Formats: CD, music download	3	10	US: 79,000

== Singles ==
=== As lead artist ===
List of singles, with selected chart positions, sales, and certifications, showing other relevant details
Title	Year	Peak chart positions					Sales	Certifications	Album
Title	Year	US	US Country Songs	US Country Airplay	CAN Country	CAN	Sales	Certifications	Album
"Why Ya Wanna"	2012	50	3		24	100	US: 733,000	* RIAA: Platinum	Jana Kramer
"Whiskey"	2012	94	27	25	47	88	US: 320,000		Jana Kramer
"I Hope It Rains"	2013	—	—	42	—	—			Jana Kramer
"Love"	2014	—	37	32	—	—			Thirty One
"I Got the Boy"	2015	56	5	6	22	85	US: 592,000	RIAA: Platinum	Thirty One
"Said No One Ever"	2016	—	—	57	—	—			Thirty One
"Circles"	2016	—	47	55	—	—	US: 43,000		Thirty One
"I've Done Love"	2017	—	35	—	—	—	US: 16,000		non-album singles
"Dammit"	2018	—	48	—	—	—			non-album singles
"Beautiful Lies"	2019	—	—	—	—	—			non-album singles
"Good Enough"	2019	—	—	—	—	—			non-album singles
"Untouchable"	2020	—	—	—	—	—			non-album singles
"Voices"	2021	—	—	—	—	—			non-album singles
"—" denotes a recording that did not chart.

=== Promotional singles ===
List of promotional singles, showing all relevant details, including notes
Title	Year	Peak chart positions		Album
Title	Year	US	US Country Digital	Album
"I Won't Give Up"	2011	75	6	Jana Kramer
"What I Love About Your Love"	2012	—	30	Jana Kramer
"—" denotes a recording that did not chart.

=== Other charted songs ===
List of other charting songs, with selected chart positions, showing other relevant details
Title	Year	Peak chart positions			Album
Title	Year	US AC	US Holiday Digital	CAN AC	Album
"Feels Like Christmas" (with Straight No Chaser)	2016	13	9	22	I'll Have Another...Christmas Album

== Music videos ==
List of music videos, showing year released and director
Title	Year	Director(s)
"Why Ya Wanna"	2012	Kristin Barlowe
"Goodbye California"	2012	—
"Whiskey" (first version)	2012	—
"One of the Boys"	2012	—
"I Hope It Rains" (first version)	2012	—
"What I Love About Your Love"	2012	—
"Whiskey"	2013	Mason Dixon
"I Hope It Rains"	2013	Kristin Barlowe
"Love"	2014	Ryan Lassan
"I Got the Boy"	2015	Kristin Barlowe
"Said No One Ever"	2016	Edgar Esteves
"Circles"	2016	Sean Hagwell
"Beautiful Lies"	2019	—

== Other appearances ==
List of non-single guest appearances, with other performing artists, showing year released and album name
Title	Year	Other artist(s)	Album
"Let's Hear It for the Boy"	2011	—	Footloose (soundtrack)
"Clouds (A Tribute to Zach Sobiech)"	2014	Jim Brickman	On A Winter's Night: The Songs and Spirit of Christmas
