= Catt Gravitt =

American songwriter

- Born: Cathy Lee Gravitt; Moline, Illinois, United States
- Genres: Country; rock; pop; gospel
- Occupation: Songwriter

Cathy Lee "Catt" Gravitt is an American songwriter based in Nashville, Tennessee. In the music business for over 20 years, she signed on as a writer with her current publishing company, Razor and Tie, in 2008. Gravitt has songwriting credits in multiple genres and has written songs with or for several artists including Kid Rock, Kelly Clarkson, Kelsea Ballerini, Jake Owen, Vince Gill and Natalie Grant, among others. In 2012, she won the SESAC Songwriter of the Year award. Gravitt most recently won the Canadian Country Music Association's 2018 Songwriter(s) of the Year award, along with co-writers Skip Black and Aaron Goodvin, for the song "Lonely Drum", performed by Aaron Goodvin.

== Career ==
After graduating from Eastern Illinois University with a journalism degree, Gravitt initially set out to be an artist. She was signed to A&M Records in an all-girl pop group in Los Angeles. After the group parted ways she made her way to Nashville where she sparked the attention of producer Garth Fundis (Trisha Yearwood, Don Williams, Sugarland). After being signed to a label development deal, Gravitt began focusing more specifically on her writing career.

A song Gravitt co-wrote about a fire that injured her godson was initially put on hold for an artist in country music, and ended up in the hands of Christian music/gospel artist Natalie Grant. The song, “In Better Hands” became a CCM No.1 single (Gravitt's first no.1) for Grant, and was nominated for Gospel Music Associations (GMA) Song of the Year and Pop Song of the Year in 2008.

Gravitt has had three different publishing deals, but has been with publishing company Razor and Tie since 2008.

In recent years, Gravitt has had simultaneous radio singles ("Amen", Eden's Edge; "Alone With You", Jake Owen; "Why Ya Wanna", Jana Kramer) on the charts in country music; garnered a producer credit (as well as helping to pen 8 of the 11 tracks on the debut album) for rock band Sons of Sylvia, along with well-respected producer Jack Joseph Puig (John Mayer, U2, Stone Temple Pilots); and a vocal producer gig from Warner Bros.

Gravitt has multiple writing credits for major pop artists like Adam Lambert and Kelly Clarkson, and the Irish group Boyzone.

== Recognitions and awards ==
Gravitt was a part of the 2004, 5x multi-platinum Rascal Flatts album Feels Like Today with her song "Where You Are" (co-written with songwriter James LeBlanc). The album reached No. 1 on both the U.S. Billboard 200 and U.S. Billboard Top Country Albums charts, and was nominated by the Academy of Country Music (ACM) for Album of the Year.

"In Better Hands" (Natalie Grant Relentless, 2008 Curb Records) became Gravitt's first No. 1 song on the Hot Christian AC chart. It received GMA Dove Award nominations for both Song of the Year and Pop/Contemporary Song of the Year in 2008. The album itself reached No. 2 on Billboard's Top Christian Albums of 2008.

Released in October 2011, Gravitt's song "Alone With You", recorded by Jake Owen, was a multi-week No. 1 on the Billboard Hot Country Songs chart, and was certified GOLD by the RIAA. His album Barefoot Blue Jean Night also reached No. 6 on the US Billboard 200, and No. 1 on U.S. Billboard Top Country Albums.

Kelly Clarkson recorded Gravitt's song "Honestly" on her 2011 platinum album Stronger which reached No. 2 on the U.S. Billboard Top 200 Albums. The album also won a Grammy for Best Pop Vocal Album in 2012. (Clarkson is No. 2 on Billboard's Year End Charts for AC Artists in 2012.)

Another one of Gravitt's songs "Why Ya Wanna" was recorded by Jana Kramer and released in 2012, breaking a record previously set by recording artist Taylor Swift when it reached No. 3 on the mediabase chart; the highest debut for any new artist since Swift's song "Tim Mcgraw" which reached No. 5 on the mediabase chart with its debut in 2006. The song, which was certified GOLD in the US by the RIAA, also reached No. 3 on the U.S. Billboard Country and U.S. Billboard Country Airplay charts. "Why Ya Wanna" landed at No. 3 on the Billboard Year End Charts for Hot Country Songs for 2012. (Kramer also went on to receive the No. 4 spot on Billboard's Year End Charts for both Top New Country Artists, and Top Country Female Artists.)

Also released in 2012, Gravitt's songs "Underneath" and "Runnin'" were a part of Adam Lambert's album Trespassing which became No. 1 on the U.S. Billboard 200, Canadian Albums Chart, and Hungarian Albums Chart.

Gravitt was nominated for Music Row's Breakthrough Songwriter of the Year in 2012, and won the SESAC Songwriter of the Year award for 2012, an award that was held by singer/songwriter from the country group Lady Antebellum, Hillary Scott, for the previous two years.

Most recently, Gravitt won the Canadian Country Music Association's 2018 Songwriter(s) of the Year, along with co-writers Skip Black and Aaron Goodvin, for the song "Lonely Drum", performed by Aaron Goodvin. In 2024, Gavitt, Black, and Goodvin were nominated for Songwriter(s) of the Year at the 2024 Canadian Country Music Awards for Goodvin's song "Country Dance".

== Discography ==
=== Singles ===
Year	Single	US Christian Hot AC	Artist	Album
2007	"In Better Hands"	1	Natalie Grant	Relentless

Year	Single	US Top 40	Artist	Album
2010	"I'll Know You"	—	Sons of Sylvia	Revelation
"—" denotes releases that did not chart

Year	Single	US Country	Artist	Album
2011	"Amen"	18	Edens Edge	Edens Edge
2011	"Alone With You"	1	Jake Owen	Barefoot Blue Jean Night
2012	"Why Ya Wanna"	3	Jana Kramer	Jana Kramer
2012	"Whiskey"	27	Jana Kramer	Jana Kramer
2014	"Love"	37	Jana Kramer	"Thirty One"

Year	Single	Canadian Country Chart	Artist
2016	"Lonely Drum"	8	Aaron Goodvin

Year	Single	Top 40 Country	Artist	Album
2017	"Tennessee Mountain Top"	36	Kid Rock	Sweet Southern Sugar

Year	Single	Mainstream Rock	Artist	Album
2017	"Greatest Show on Earth"	16	Kid Rock	Sweet Southern Sugar

Year	Single	Active Rock Radio	Artist	Album
2017	"Greatest Show on Earth"	20	Kid Rock	Sweet Southern Sugar

=== Songs written by Gravitt ===
Year	Song	Artist	Album	Co-writers
1997	"Don't Break the Wings"	Holly Dunn	Leave One Bridge Standing	
2001	"I'm Goin' Back"	Trace Adkins	Chrome	Craig Wiseman, Bobby Terry
2003	Where You Are"	James Leblanc	Muscle Shoals City Limits	
2003	"You Have No Idea"	Kenny Rogers	Back to the Well	
2003	"If I Was An Angel"	Daniel Lee Martin	All That I Am	
2004	"Where You Are"	Rascal Flatts	Feels Like Today	James LeBlanc
2004	"If I Was An Angel"	Glenn Cummings	Big	
2005	"In My Neighborhood"	Craig Morgan	My Kind of Livin'	Monty Padson, Danny Wells
2005	"This is Me Missing You"	Joey Daniels	Take Me Off the Market	
2006	"My Life"	Ronnie Milsap	My Life	Gerald O'Brien, Pam Rose
2006	"High"	Trace Adkins	Dangerous Man	
2006	"My Life"	Doc Walker	Doc Walker	Gerald O'Brien, Pam Rose
2006	"Love Me Wild"	Angela Hacker	Nashville Star Season 5	
2008	"In Better Hands"	Natalie Grant	Relentless	Jim Daddario
2008	"Help Me, Help You"	Julianne Hough	Julianne Hough	Danny Green
2009	"Anything is Possible"	Jake Mcvey	Anything is Possible	
2009	"Train"	Davisson Brothers Band	Davisson Brothers Band	
2009	"Lies"	Martina McBride	Shine	Tania Hancheraff, Gerlad O'Brien, David Campbell
2009	"You Wouldn't Cry (Andrew's Song)	Mandisa	Freedom	Mandisa, Cindy Morgan
2009	En Tus Manos (In Better Hands)	Shelia Romero	En Tus Manos	
2010	"Plastic Jesus"	High Valley	High Valley	James LeBlance
2010	"High"	David Bradley	Movin' On	
2010	"Nothing Without You"	Boyzone	Brother	Tom Shapiro, busbee
2010	"50 Ways"	Sons of Sylvia	Revelation	Ashley Clark, Gerald O'Brien
2010	"The War Within"	Sons of Sylvia	Revelation	Ashley Clark, Adam Clark, Austin Clark, Brian Howes
2010	"Song of Solomon"	Sons of Sylvia	Revelation	Ashley Clark, Gerald O'Brien
2010	"Long Beach"	Sons of Sylvia	Revelation	Ashley Clark, Adam Clark, Austin Clark
2010	"John Wayne"	Sons of Sylvia	Revelation	Ashley Clark, Gerald O'Brien
2010	"I'll Know You"	Sons of Sylvia	Revelation	Ashley Clark, Adam Clark, Austin Clark, Brian Howes
2010	"Give Me Love"	Sons of Sylvia	Revelation	Ashley Clark, Mile Shimshack
2010	"Ghost Town"	Sons of Sylvia	Revelation	Ashley Clark, Mike Shimshack
2011	"I Hope You're Listening to the Radio"	Nicole Donatone	If You Knew	
2011	"Hurry Down Sunshine"	Mycle Wastman	I'm All Over It	
2011	"Sunshine"	George Canyon	Better Be Home Soon	
2011	"Tell Me a Lie"	The Downtown Fiction	Let's Be Animals	
2011	"Every Other Memory"	Eli Young Band	Life at Best	Chris DeStefano, Josh Kear
2011	"Nothing Without You"	Committed	Committed	
2011	"Alone With You"	Jake Owen	Barefoot Blue Jean Night	Shane McAnally, J. T. Harding
2011	"Honestly"	Kelly Clarkson	Stronger	Tom Shapiro, Robert Marvin
2012	"I Hope You're Listening to the Radio"	Lucie Evans	I Hope You're Listening to the Radio	
2012	"What a Song Can Do"	Rachel Crow	Rachel Crow	Gerald O'Brien, Jackie Wilson
2012	"Underneath"	Adam Lambert	Trespassing	Adam Lambert, Tom Shapiro, Josh Crosby
2012	"Runnin' "	Adam Lambert	Trespassing	Adam Lambert, David Marshall, Fred Williams, Robert Marvin
2012	"Goodbye California"	Jana Kramer	Jana Kramer	Jana Kramer, Josh Crosby, Leslie Roy
2012	"Whiskey"	Jana Kramer	Jana Kramer	Sam Mizer
2012	"Why Ya Wanna"	Jana Kramer	Jana Kramer	Ashley Gorley, Chris DeStefano
2012	"Last Supper"	Edens Edge	Edens Edge	Hannah Blaylock
2012	"Amen"	Edens Edge	Edens Edge	Skip Black, Hannah Blaylock, Gerald O'Brien
2012	"Roots"	Edens Edge	Edens Edge	Cherrill Green, Skip Black
2014	"Just Another Song"	Lucy Hale	Road Between	Mike Daly, Lucy Hale
2014	"Fight"	Gloriana	Three	
2014	"Baseball Cap"	John King	On Your Lips EP	
2015	To the Moon	Ashley Clark	Greyhound EP	
2015	"Day Before Temptation"	The SteelDrivers	The Muscle Shoals Recordings	
2015	"XO"	Kelsea Ballerini	The First Time	Kelsea Ballerini, Gerald O'Brien
2015	"Bullet"	Jana Kramer	Thirty One	Jana Kramer, Martin Frederiksen
2015	"Don't Touch My Radio"	Jana Kramer	Thirty One	Jana Kramer, Blair Daly
2015	"Just Like in the Movies"	Jana Kramer	Thirty One	Jana Kramer, Brian Keirulf
2015	"Love"	Jana Kramer	Thirty One	Jimmy Robbins
2016	"Lonely Drum"	Aaron Goodvin		Aaron Goodvin, Skip Black
2016	"I Can't Do This"	Vince Gill	Down to My Last Habit	Vince Gill, Brennin Hunt
2017	"Tennessee Mountaintop"	Kid Rock	Sweet Southern Sugar	Kid Rock, Tim Montana
2017	"Greatest Show on Earth"	Kid Rock	Sweet Southern Sugar	Kid Rock, Tim Montana
2018	"OK"	Ilse DeLange	Ilse DeLange	Ilse DeLange, Tofer Brown
2018	"Millionaires"	Thompson Square		Marv Green, Courtney Cole
2019	"Impossible"	Carlos Vara	Carlos Vara	Carlos Vara, Josh Bruce Williams
2019	"The Only Thing I Ever Got Right"	Ilse DeLange	Gravel and Dust	Ilse DeLange, Tofer Brown
2021	"Don't Quit"	Jordan Smith	Be Still & Know	Jordan Smith, Bernie Herms

=== Other credits ===
==== Vocal production ====
Label	Artist	Song	Album	Year
Interscope Records	Sons of Sylvia	"John Wayne"	Revelation	2010
Interscope Records	Sons of Sylvia	"Ghost Town"	Revelation	2010
Interscope Records	Sons of Sylvia	"The War Within"	Revelation	2010
Warner Bros.	Jana Kramer	"Why Ya Wanna"	Jana Kramer	2012
Warner Bros.	Jana Kramer	"Whiskey"	Jana Kramer	2012
Warner Bros.	Jana Kramer	"Goodbye California"	Jana Kramer	2012
RCA	Adam Lambert	"Underneath"	Trespassing	2012
Epic	Cher Lloyd	"Human"	Sorry I'm Late	2014

==== TV/Placements ====
One Tree Hill, Desperate Housewives, Nashville, Dancing With the Stars, American Idol, Jimmy Kimmel Live, The Jay Leno Show, CMT Music Awards, ACA Awards, The Next: Fame is at Your Doorstep, Opry Live, The Singing Bee, Home for the Holidays 2012 CBS Special, The Fosters, Vanderpump Rules, etc
