= The Clark Family Experience =

American country music band

- Origin: Rocky Mount, Virginia, U.S.
- Genres: Country
- Years active: 2000–2002
- Label: Curb
- Spinoffs: Sons of Sylvia
- Past members: Aaron Clark; Adam Clark; Alan Clark; Andrew Clark; Ashley Clark; Austin Clark

The Clark Family Experience was an American country music band composed of six brothers, all with the surname Clark: Alan (guitar, vocals), Aaron (bass guitar, vocals), Adam (mandolin, vocals), Ashley (fiddle), Andrew (drums), and Austin (lap steel guitar, keyboards), all natives of the state of Virginia.

Signed to Curb Records in 2000, The Clark Family Experience debuted on the American country music scene that year with the release of their single "Meanwhile Back at the Ranch". A Top 20 hit on the Billboard Hot Country Singles & Tracks (now Hot Country Songs) charts, the song also became the thirteenth highest-selling single in the history of country music at the time. "Meanwhile Back at the Ranch" was the first of four chart singles from their self-titled debut album, released in 2001. Due to a series of financial problems, however, the band declared bankruptcy and disbanded later that year.

In 2007, Adam, Ashley, and Austin reunited as The Clark Brothers and won the Fox Networks talent show The Next Great American Band that year. The Clark Brothers has since been renamed Sons of Sylvia.

== Biography ==
The six members of The Clark Family Experience — Aaron, Adam, Alan, Andrew, Ashley and Austin — are part of a musically inclined family that comprises the eleven children of Freddy and Sylvia Clark. All six boys first performed professionally in 1993, eventually assuming the name The Clark Family Experience.

The band was signed as "series regulars" on The Oak Ridge Boys' 1998 television show on The Nashville Network, Live From Las Vegas. The show aired 15 episodes, and although just a modest success, it introduced the band to a nationwide audience.

Curb Records signed The Clark Family Experience to a recording contract in 2000. The band also served as an opening act for several country musicians, including Faith Hill and Tim McGraw. McGraw also co-produced The Clark Family Experience's self-titled debut album, which was released on February 27, 2001. The album produced a total of four singles on the Billboard country music charts, including "Meanwhile Back at the Ranch", which soon became a Top 20 hit on the Hot Country Singles & Tracks (now Hot Country Songs) charts, as well as the thirteenth highest-selling single in the history of country music at the time. The album's second single, "Standin' Still", peaked at No. 36, while the third and fourth singles both failed to reach Top 40.

=== Bankruptcy ===
A year after the release of their debut album, The Clark Family Experience filed for Chapter 7 bankruptcy. The band owed more than $800,000 in debt to Curb, citing mismanagement and unfair contracts from the label as the reasons for their debt.

Curb then attempted to dismiss the Clark brothers' bankruptcies, claiming that the band was trying to exit its contract. In addition, the label tried to seek an injunction to keep the band from recording for any other label. By August 2003, the label had dropped the suit. The Clark Family Experience disbanded soon afterward. Adam, Ashley, and Austin reunited in 2008 as The Clark Brothers and won the TV competition The Next Great American Band that year. In 2009, this trio changed its name to Sons of Sylvia.

== The Clark Family Experience (2001) ==
The Clark Family Experience

Studio album by The Clark Family Experience
- Released: February 27, 2001
- Genre: Country
- Label: Curb
- Producers: Byron Gallimore and Tim McGraw

=== Track listing ===
No.	Title	Writer(s)	Length
1.	"Going Away"	Ashley Clark	3:51
2.	"Because"	Keith Follesé, Dennis Matkosky	3:45
3.	"It'll Always Be You"	Don Sampson, Randy VanWarmer	3:21
4.	"Standin' Still"	Robin Lee Bruce, Christi Dannemiller, Camille Harrison	3:23
5.	"When I Look at You"	Alan Clark, Philip Douglas, Tony Marty	3:19
6.	"Tell Me What You Wanna Do"	Steve Bogard, Marv Green, Bill Luther	3:21
7.	"Meanwhile Back at the Ranch"	Wayne Kirkpatrick, Gordon Kennedy	2:59
8.	"Just Emily"	Bruce, Bill Decker	3:41
9.	"You Were Smilin'"	Holly Lamar, Jess Leary	4:11
10.	"To Quote Shakespeare"	Greg Barnhill, Lamar	3:57

=== Personnel ===
==== The Clark Family Experience ====
- Aaron Clark - bass guitar, upright bass, vocals
- Adam Clark - bass guitar, mandolin, electric guitar, vocals
- Alan Clark - acoustic guitar, harmonica, vocals
- Andrew Clark - drums
- Ashley Clark - fiddle, acoustic guitar
- Austin Clark - Dobro, acoustic guitar, piano

==== Additional musicians ====
- Mike Brignardello - bass guitar
- Larry Byrom - acoustic guitar
- Dan Dugmore - pedal steel guitar
- Paul Franklin - pedal steel guitar
- Aubrey Haynie - fiddle
- Michael Landau - electric guitar
- B. James Lowry - electric guitar
- Brent Mason - electric guitar
- Steve Nathan - keyboards
- Biff Watson - acoustic guitar
- Lonnie Wilson - drums
- Glenn Worf - bass guitar

=== Chart performance ===
Chart (2002)	Peak position
US Top Country Albums (Billboard)	68

=== Singles ===
Year	Single	Peak positions	
Year	Single	US Country	US
2000	"Meanwhile Back at the Ranch"^{[A]}	18	80
2001	"Standin' Still"	34	—
2001	"To Quote Shakespeare"	51	—
2002	"Going Away"	44	—
"—" denotes releases that did not chart

Notes

- A "Meanwhile Back at the Ranch" reached number 39 on the RPM Country Tracks chart on November 6, 2000, when RPM ceased publication.

=== Music videos ===
Year	Video
2000	"Meanwhile Back at the Ranch"
2002	"Going Away"
