= Boy Like Me (Aaron Goodvin song) =

2021 song by Aaron Goodvin

Single by Aaron Goodvin

from the EP Lucky Stars
- Released: June 4, 2021 (Note: "Boy Like Me" was released as a single to country radio in the United States on June 6, 2022.)
- Genre: Country rock
- Length: 3:22
- Label: Warner Canada; Reviver
- Songwriter(s): Aaron Goodvin; Michael August; Skip Black
- Producer(s): Aaron Goodvin; Matt McClure

Aaron Goodvin singles chronology
"Lonely Drum" (2021)	"Boy Like Me" (2021)	"Lucky Stars" (2021)

Music video
- "Boy Like Me" on YouTube

"Boy Like Me" is a song recorded, co-written, and co-produced by Canadian-American country artist Aaron Goodvin. He wrote the track with Michael August and Skip Black. It was the lead single off his 2021 extended play Lucky Stars.

== Background ==
Goodvin wrote "Boy Like Me" about the feeling he got when he met his wife Victoria. He said he feels that the song is "going to dictate what the live show is going to look like in the very near future", remarking that he was "excited" to release the song with live shows resuming after a long pause in touring due to the COVID-19 pandemic.

== Critical reception ==
Nanci Dagg of Canadian Beats Media said that "Boy Like Me" has an "infectious hook", adding "hearing Goodvin’s unmistakable voice makes it all the better". Front Porch Music called the track "another great song to add to his growing list of hits". Jacob LeBlanc of CJWE FM said the song "has the makings of becoming the feel-good country song of the summer".

== Accolades ==
Year	Association	Category	Result	Ref
2022	CCMA	Single Of The Year	Nominated	

== Music video ==
The official music video for "Boy Like Me" premiered on July 23, 2021, and was directed by Sean Hagwell. It was filmed in Nashville, Tennessee and showcases a young boy and girl growing up from kids playing together to eventually getting married as adults.

== Chart performance ==
"Boy Like Me" reached a peak of #1 on the Billboard Canada Country chart for the week of October 23, 2021, marking Goodvin's second number one hit after "You Are". It also peaked at #84 on the Canadian Hot 100 for the same week, becoming a new career high peak for Goodvin on his national all-genre chart.

Chart performance for "Boy Like Me"
Chart (2021)	Peak position
Canada (Canadian Hot 100)	84
Canada Country (Billboard)	1
US Country Indicator (Billboard)	52
