= The 440 Alliance =

- Origin: Arlington, Texas, United States
- Genres: Cello rock
- Years active: 2004–present
- Label: Foundation Sound
- Members: Drew Johnson; Andrew Walton; Nathan Keefer; Neil Fong Gilfillan; Jeff Harvick; Brandon Vanderford

The 440 Alliance is an American cello rock band from Arlington, Texas consisting of five cellists and a percussionist. The group formed in 2004 and is known for their diverse approach to the cello, incorporating electric effects, turntables, piano, and mallet percussion. They received national exposure on NPR's All Songs Considered, the Drew Pearson Show on Fox Sports, and on Fox's musical reality show, The Next Great American Band. The group has performed at a number of private parties for celebrities including Troy Aikman (Former NFL Quarterback for the Dallas Cowboys), Jerry Jones (Dallas Cowboys owner), John Kirtland (Former drummer for Deep Blue Something and owner of Kirtland Records), Janine Turner (from Northern Exposure), members of the Dallas Symphony Orchestra, as well as the Dallas, TX movie premiere for the film The Soloist (starring Jamie Foxx and Robert Downey Jr.).

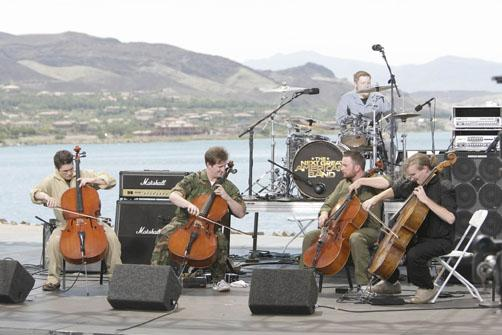
The 440 Alliance performs the Knight Rider theme on The Next Great American Band

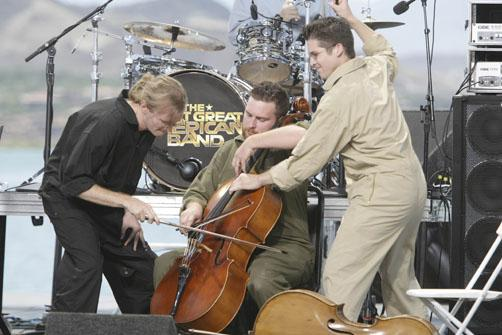
During the intro, all four cellists perform on a single cello.

== Current members ==
- Drew Johnson (High Notes) – Cello, Pedal FX
- Andrew Walton (Captain Bringdown) – Cello, Talk Box
- Nathan Keefer (Major Scales) – Cello, Piano, Acoustic Guitar
- Neil Fong Gilfillan (Maestro Fong) – Cello, Turntables
- Jeff Harvick (Kid Bach) - Cello, Theremin
- Brandon Vanderford (Lieutenant Branderford) – Drums, Mallet Percussion

== Former members ==
- Cody MacCafferty (Commander Cody) – Drums
- Benom Plumb - Drums

== Discography ==
- Top 440 (15th Anniversary CD), 2020
1. Immigrant Song - Led Zeppelin
2. Dreams - The Cranberries
3. More Than A Feeling - Boston
4. Good Vibrations - The Beach Boys
5. Billie Jean - Michael Jackson
6. The Longest Time - Billy Joel
7. Crazy Train - Ozzy Osbourne
8. God Only Knows - The Beach Boys
9. The Final Countdown - Europe
10. Home Sweet Home - Mötley Crüe
11. Welcome To Your Doom
12. Eye of the Tiger (Live) - Survivor
13. Shut-Uptown Funk & Dance (Live Medley) - Bruno Mars / Walk The Moon
14. Canon in Astley (Live) - Rick Astley
15. Just What I Needed (Live) - The Cars
- Crooked Bridge, 2010
1. Bogus Gravitas
2. Sweet Cello 'O' Mine - Guns N' Roses
3. The Gold Cartridge (Zelda) - Koji Kondo
4. Fugue 'N Blues
5. The Price Is Wrong - Bob Israel
6. Livin' On A Prayer - Bon Jovi
7. Crooked Bridge Jam
8. All You Need Is Love - The Beatles
- The 440 Alliance, 2006
1. This is Gonna Rock!
2. 440 Jam
3. Black Hole Sun - Soundgarden
4. Tango de la Turntable
5. Stairway to Heaven - Led Zeppelin
6. Title
7. I Am the Walrus - The Beatles
8. ¡Te Gusta 440!
9. Bohemian Rhapsody - Queen
10. Black Tux (Hidden Track)
11. surlaW ehT mA I (Hidden Track)
- Playin' Cellos, 2005
1. Pulp Fact (Miserlou) - Dick Dale and the Deltones
2. Don't Stop Believin' - Journey
3. Classic Crunk
4. A Day in the Life/Sergeant Pepper's Lonely Hearts Club Band (Reprise) (Live) - The Beatles
5. Super Mario Bros. (Live) - Koji Kondo
6. 440 Jam (live)
