= Circles (Jana Kramer song) =

Single by Jana Kramer

from the album Thirty One
- Released: July 18, 2016
- Genre: Country pop
- Length: 3:59
- Label: Elektra Nashville; Warner Nashville
- Songwriters: Alyssa Bonagura; Brandon Hood; Jeffrey Steele
- Producer: Scott Hendricks

Jana Kramer singles chronology
"Said No One Ever" (2016)	"Circles" (2016)	"I've Done Love" (2017)

Music video
- "Circles" on YouTube

"Circles" is a song recorded by American actress and country music artist Jana Kramer for her second studio album, Thirty One (2015). It was written by Alyssa Bonagura, Brandon Hood, and Jeffrey Steele. "Circles" was first released to digital retailers in September 2015 as the first promotional single from the album. The song was serviced to American country radio through Elektra Records Nashville and Warner Music Nashville on July 18, 2016 as the record's fourth official single.

Upon release, the song has been met with mostly positive reviews, but has performed only modestly well on the charts. "Circles" peaked at No. 55 on the Billboard Country Airplay chart, and at No. 47 on the magazine's Hot Country Songs chart.

== Content ==
"Circles" is a mid-tempo ballad that describes an unbreakable bond of love. Kramer described the track as a "really cool, dark and edgy love song," in an interview with Taste of Country. The song's lyrics speak of "piecing together a broken heart," and refer to the narrator's love as "the only part of [her] unbroken." Elias Leight of Billboard described the song as a sonic standout on the album, writing, "'Circles' ... forgoes guitar squalls in favor of a dark bass groove. At times, it sounds like something that might have been pulled from an early '80s record." The song was written by Alyssa Bonagura, Brandon Hood, and Jeffrey Steele and produced by Scott Hendricks.

== Reception ==
=== Critical ===
In a review of Thirty One, Chuck Dauphin on Sounds Like Nashville praised the song as an album highlight. "But, it's the ballads that really seem to soar here the most," writes Dauphin, "ranging from the heartbreak of 'Last Song' to the hopeful romantic feel of 'Circles.'"

=== Commercial ===
"Circles" debuted at number 60 on the Billboard Country Airplay chart dated October 1, 2016. It fell off the chart the following week but re-entered at 58 on the chart dated October 29, 2016. The song rose to 55 on the chart dated December 24, 2016 and has since peaked at this rank. "Circles" entered the Hot Country Songs chart at number 47 on the chart dated December 10, 2016. The song has sold 43,000 copies in the US as of November 2016.

== Music video ==
An accompanying music video was directed by Sean Hagwell and premiered September 3, 2016. Shot entirely in black and white, the video features different angles of Kramer performing the song on a stage illuminated by spotlights. The video has been praised for its simple, "elegant" visual treatment.

== Charts ==
Chart (2016)	Peak position
US Country Airplay (Billboard)	55
US Hot Country Songs (Billboard)	47

== Release history ==
Country	Date	Format	Label	Ref.
Worldwide	September 4, 2015	Digital download (promotional)	Elektra Nashville	
United States	July 18, 2016	Country radio	Elektra Nashville; Warner Nashville	
