= Revelation (Sons of Sylvia album) =

Studio album by Sons of Sylvia
- Released: April 27, 2010
- Genre: Pop, country
- Length: 39:29
- Label: Interscope, 19
- Producer: Ryan Tedder, Jack Joseph Puig, Jeff Trott, Brian Howes, Gerald O’Brien, Catt Gravitt, Mike Shimshack

Singles from Revelation
- 1. "Love Left to Lose" Released: April 27, 2010; 2. "I'll Know You" Released: 2010

Revelation is the only studio album by American country pop group Sons of Sylvia. It was released in United States on April 27, 2010. The first single is "Love Left to Lose," which they performed on American Idol on April 28, 2010. The album's second single "I'll Know You" released to radio on 2010.

== Track listing ==
Standard
No.	Title	Writer(s)	Length
1.	"John Wayne"	Ashley Clark, Catt Gravitt, Gerald O'Brien	4:28
2.	"Love Left to Lose"	Ashley Clark, Ryan Tedder	3:16
3.	"Revelation"	Ashley Clark, Lindy Robbins	3:21
4.	"50 Ways"	Ashley Clark, Gravitt, O'Brien, Brian Howes	3:04
5.	"Song of Solomon"	Ashley Clark, Gravitt, O'Brien	4:56
6.	"Give Me Love"	Ashley, Clark, Gravitt, Mike Shimshack	3:17
7.	"Ghost Town"	Ashley Clark, Gravitt, O'Brien	3:09
8.	"Long Beach"	Ashley Clark, Adam Clark, Austin Clark, Gravitt	3:38
9.	"I'll Know You"	Ashley Clark, Adam Clark, Austin Clark, Gravitt, Howes	4:10
10.	"The War Within"	Ashley Clark, Adam Clark, Austin Clark, Gravitt, O'Brien	6:10
Total length:			39:29

iTunes Bonus Track
No.	Title	Length
11.	"It's Only Love"	3:33

Amazon Bonus Track
No.	Title	Length
11.	"Really Need to Know"	3:15

Napster Bonus Track
No.	Title	Length
11.	"Here the Angels Sing"	3:29

== Charts ==
Chart (2010)	Peak position
U.S. Billboard 200	33
U.S. Billboard Top Rock Albums	9
