= Whiskey (Jana Kramer song) =

Single by Jana Kramer

from the album Jana Kramer
- Released: November 5, 2012
- Recorded: 2012
- Genre: Country
- Length: 3:36
- Label: Elektra Nashville
- Songwriters: Catt Gravitt; Sam Mizell
- Producer: Scott Hendricks

Jana Kramer singles chronology
"Why Ya Wanna" (2012)	"Whiskey" (2012)	"I Hope It Rains" (2013)

"Whiskey" is a song recorded by American actress and country music artist Jana Kramer. The song was initially released April 26, 2011 as a promotional single and was later released to country radio through Elektra Records Nashville on November 5, 2012 as the second single from her self-titled debut album. It was written by Catt Gravitt and Sam Mizell. "Whiskey" garnered positive reviews from critics praising the instrumentation and lyrical work for allowing a poignant performance from Kramer.

"Whiskey" peaked at numbers 25 and 27 on both the Billboard Country Airplay and Hot Country Songs charts respectively. It also charted at number 94 on the Hot 100. The song has sold 320,000 copies in the United States as of May 2013. It received similar chart prominence in Canada, peaking at number 47 on the Country chart and number 88 on the Canadian Hot 100.

== Writing and inspiration ==
"Whiskey" was written by songwriters Catt Gravitt and Sam Mizell. Mizell said she came up with the title and concept of the song and then shared it with Gravitt. Mizell said of writing the song with Gravitt, "Catt is one of the best writers out there these days," Mizell explains. "It was her idea to have everybody call him 'cornbread' and all that stuff. I was like, 'Oh man. . .that's great!' I had a little bit of the chorus, but then she kind of took off with it. We kind of messed around on the chorus for a while, and the song kind of took off on its own." Kramer told the Boot in an interview, “… [the song] says, 'The burn, the sting and the high. I should have just called him whiskey, because that's exactly what he does to me.' I love it. It's a little bit darker, which is nice and a little more rockin' once it gets into the chorus." Mizell continued on of how the lyrics got to Kramer “We wrote it several years ago, and she was working with Jana at the time… Catt played it for her, and Jana really liked it. They ended up recording it, and they put it on that ‘One Tree Hill’ TV show, I think in 2011.”

== Production ==
“Whiskey” was produced by Scott Hendricks. Jonathan Pappalardo, of My Kind of Country said of the tune, “The production is the track’s real achievement, though. Besides Zac Brown Band, there hasn’t been this much audible fiddle and acoustic guitar on a mainstream single in a long time, and she and producer Scott Hendricks deserve credit for not marring the track with any electric guitars or loud crashing drums. I do wish he’d gone further into neo-traditional territory, leaving out the poppish ‘ooohs’ in the intro and adding in steel guitar, but you can’t fault him for slicking it up just enough to get it airplay. In any event, “Whiskey” is allowed to properly breathe, and it’s a refreshing change of pace from the normal mainstream fare."

== Critical reception ==
Billy Dukes of Taste of Country gave the song three and a half stars out of five, writing that "it’s tough to turn away from her hurt, which on this song is aided by a tight lyric and sensible mix of pop and traditional country styling" and "while her souped-up southern charm might be a bit over the top, it actually works to sell the heartache." Matt Bjorke of Roughstock gave the song a favorable review, calling it a "mid-tempo ballad that shows off Jana Kramer's natural alto vocal delivery and her ability to wring each emotional note out of the lyrics." Ben Foster of Country Universe gave the song a B+ grade, saying that "though things are glossed-up just enough to keep from offending P.C. country radio standards, both the production and vocal stay out of the way of the lyrics, and the moaning fiddle intro feels like the return of an old friend."

== Chart performance ==
"Whiskey" debuted at number 56 on the U.S. Billboard Country Airplay chart for the week of November 10, 2012, and later debuted at number 44 on the U.S. Billboard Hot Country Songs chart for the week of January 19, 2013. It also debuted at number 99 on the U.S. Billboard Hot 100 chart for the week of May 14, 2011 and at number 88 on the Canadian Hot 100 chart for the week of May 14, 2011. It returned to the Hot 100 chart for the week of April 20, 2013, spending a week at number 94. The song has sold 320,000 copies in the US as of May 2013.

== Music video ==
The music video premiered in January 2013. The video kicks off with Kramer lying on a couch: her hair is messy, she’s curled up under a blanket and it looks like she hasn’t gotten a lot of sleep lately. As she sings the first few frames of the song, she starts to daydream about the series of events that brought her to where she is now. In her flashback, Kramer finds herself at a bonfire party where she first meets a guy that she probably should have stayed away from. Shortly after they lock eyes, someone behind him says something that doesn’t go over well. Kramer’s new love interest turns around and knocks the other guy down, pouncing on top of him and pummeling him in the face until a few other party-goers pull him off. After the fight, Kramer cuddles up with this bad boy by the fire, sharing a few pulls from his bottle of whiskey. They go back to her trailer together where they share a hot and heavy night. It gets cut short when a cop breaks in the door and cuffs Kramer’s new boyfriend. He gets hauled away in a police car while she looks on, heartbroken.

== Charts ==
=== Weekly charts ===
Chart (2012–2013)	Peak position
Canada Hot 100 (Billboard)	88
Canada Country (Billboard)	47
US Billboard Hot 100	94
US Country Airplay (Billboard)	25
US Hot Country Songs (Billboard)	27

=== Year-end charts ===
Chart (2013)	Position
US Country Airplay (Billboard)	93
US Hot Country Songs (Billboard)	89

== Release history ==
Country	Date	Format	Version	Label	Ref.
United States	April 26, 2011	Digital download (promotional)	Original	Elektra Nashville; Warner Bros. Nashville	
United States	November 5, 2012	Country radio	Original	Elektra Nashville; Warner Bros. Nashville	
Worldwide	April 16, 2013	Digital download	Acoustic	Elektra Nashville	
