= Denver and the Mile High Orchestra =

American band

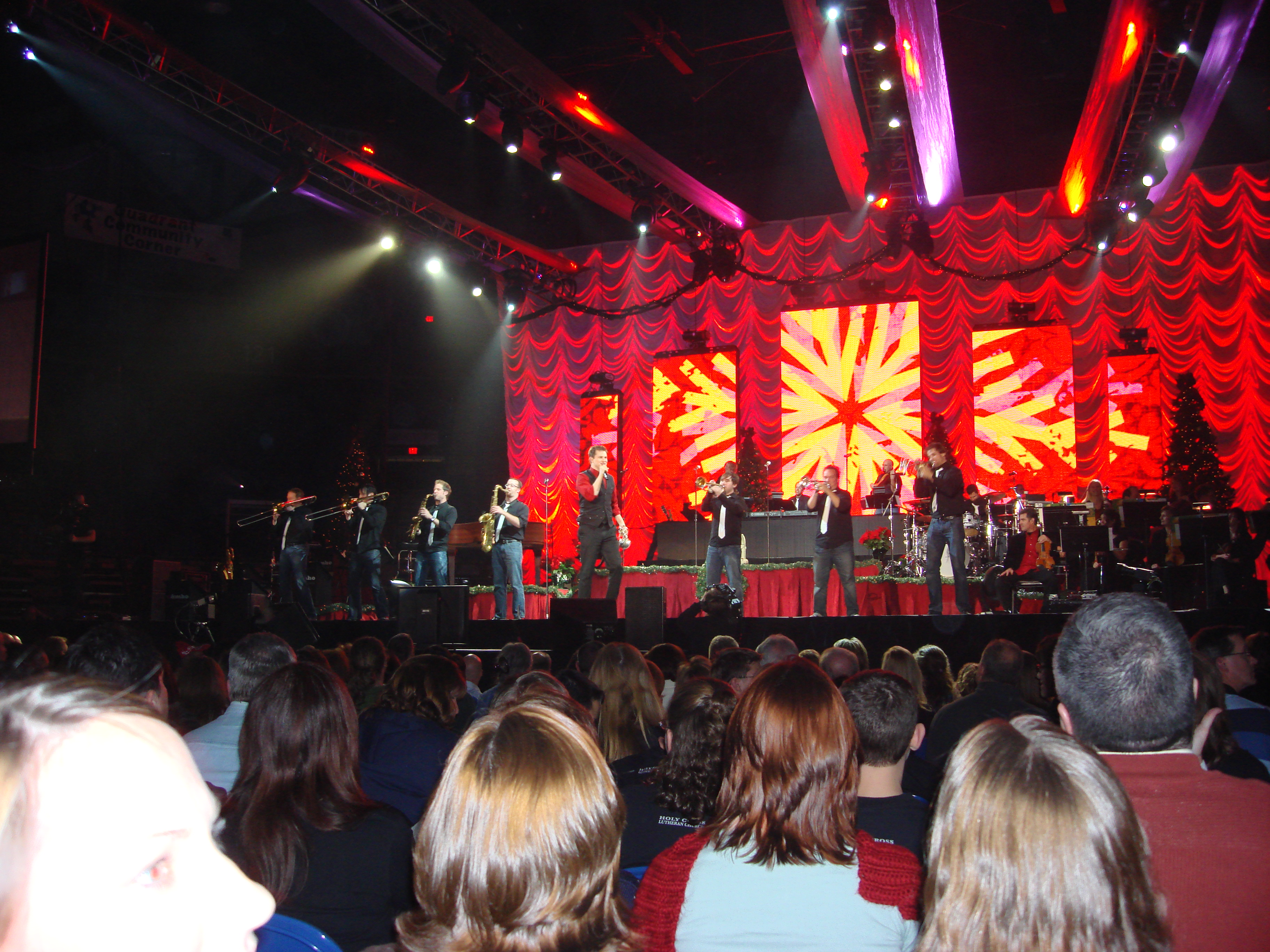
- D&MHO performing on Casting Crowns Christmas Celebration

Background information
- Origin: Nashville, TN, USA
- Genres: Pop/Funk/Rock/R+B/Gospel
- Years active: 1999–present
- Label: Reel Loud Records
- Members: Adam Beck; Denver Bierman; Justin Carpenter; Chris Gregg; Reggie Grisham; Kenn Hughes; Michael Kemp; Tony Marvelli; Jeff Pardo; Jared Ribble; Paul Shearer; Greg Dampier; Scott Steward
- Past members: Keith Cooper; Josh Deane; Ross Walters; Jeffrey Scot Wills; Dan Mullis
- Website: denverandmho.com

Denver and the Mile High Orchestra (DMHO) is a horn-driven band based out of Nashville, Tennessee. DMHO was formed by a group of friends at Belmont University in 1999. They have traveled across the world, playing at churches, conferences, and festivals. They have performed at two Olympic Games (2002-Salt Lake City, 2004-Athens), and were the house band at the 2005 Gospel Music Association Music Awards. DMHO finished third on The Next Great American Band, a "battle of the bands" reality show that aired on Fox in late 2007.

== Personnel (as of 4/27/07) ==
- Denver Bierman - Bandleader, Composer/Arranger, Lead Vocals, Trumpet

=== Trumpets ===
- Scott Steward - Lead trumpet, Vocals
- Adam Beck
- Reggie Grisham
- Keith Everette Smith

=== Saxophones ===
- Chris Gregg - Alto Saxophone, tenor saxophone, Soprano Saxophone, Vocals
- Michael "Motown" Kemp - Tenor Saxophone
- Eric Kilby - Baritone Sax

=== Trombones ===
- "Hey" Kenn "Blues" Hughes - lead, Musical Director
- Justin Carpenter

=== Rhythm ===
- Jeff Pardo - Piano, Keyboards, Vocals
- Tony Marvelli - Bass, Vocals
- Jared Ribble - Drums
- Paul Gregory - Guitar

=== Tour Personnel ===
- Nathan Bierman - CFO, marketing director, Merchandise Manager
- "Big Papa" Eric Kilby - Tour Manager, Production Manager

== Discography ==
=== Albums ===
- Mile High Hymns, 2014
- Live! It Up, 2006
- Swing! The Best of Denver & the Mile High Orchestra, 2005
- Timeless Christmas, 2004
- Good to Go, 2004
- Stand, 2002
- Act The Scat, 2001

=== EPs ===
- EP, 2009
- Christmas Pre-Release EP, 2003
- Big Band Patriot EP, 2003

=== DVDs ===
- Let Freedom Ring (DVD/CD combo), 2011
- Winter Wonderland (DVD/CD combo), 2007
- Live at Long Hollow, 2005

== Side projects ==
In 2009, various members of DMHO embarked on several side projects. Denver, Jared, Paul, Chris and tony started a side band called Planet VII. Jeff plays keyboards for CCM artist Matthew West. Scott had a small acting role in Hannah Montana: The Movie, as well as main spokesman roles in two network television commercials. Denver, Chris and Justin played horns for pop/rock artist Kelly Clarkson during her 2009 summer tour and are currently involved in her fall tour and Paul Gregory Shearer has been touring with Mandisa. Most recently (2014), Scott Started his own band called "Force Ten" - a Rush Tribute Band where he is the lead vocalist and plays keyboards.
