= Heart of the Country (film) =

- Film poster
- Directed by: John Ward
- Written by: John Ward
- Based on: Heart of the Country by John Ward and Rene Gutteridge
- Produced by: Anne Hawthorne; Wayne Thompson; John Ward
- Starring: Jana Kramer; Gerald McRaney
- Cinematography: Christopher Marcus
- Edited by: Christopher Marcus
- Music by: Orest Hrynewich; Jack Lenz
- Production company: Bay Ridge Films
- Distributed by: 20th Century Fox Home Entertainment
- Release date: August 20, 2013
- Running time: 87 minutes
- Country: United States
- Language: English

Heart of the Country is a 2013 American drama film written and directed by John Ward and starring Jana Kramer and Gerald McRaney. When a wealthy New York socialites’ world is in upheaval, she'll need to lean on the family and southern roots she left long ago. It is based on a novel by Ward and Rene Gutteridge.

== Cast ==
- Jana Kramer as Faith
- Gerald McRaney as Calvin
- Randy Wayne as Luke
- Shaun Sipos as Lee
- Anne Hawthorne as Olivia

== Production ==
The film was shot in Wilmington, North Carolina.

== Reception ==
Tracy Moore of Common Sense Media awarded the film three stars out of five.
