= Sons of Sylvia =

American country pop trio

- Also known as: The Clark Brothers
- Origin: Virginia, United States
- Genres: Country pop
- Years active: 2007–2012
- Labels: Universal South; Interscope
- Spinoff of: The Clark Family Experience
- Past members: Adam Clark; Ashley Clark; Austin Clark

Sons of Sylvia, originally known as The Clark Brothers, was an American country pop trio composed of three brothers with the surname Clark: Adam (guitar, mandolin), Ashley (lead vocals, fiddle, mandolin, guitar), and Austin (background vocals, resonator guitar). All three, along with their three other brothers Aaron, Andrew, and Alan, originally composed a sextet called The Clark Family Experience. Sons of Sylvia released its debut album in April 2010.

== History ==
Brothers Adam, Ashley, Austin, Aaron, Andrew, and Alan Clark, natives of Rocky Mount, Virginia, founded a family band in the late 1990s called The Clark Family Experience. The band recorded one album for Curb Records in 2000 and charted in the Top 20 on the Billboard country singles charts with "Meanwhile Back at the Ranch." The Clark Family Experience disbanded in 2002 after filing for Chapter 7 bankruptcy.

In 2007, Adam, Ashley, and Austin began playing as The Clark Brothers. Under this name, the trio won the top prize in the Fox Networks talent competition The Next Great American Band, and subsequently signed to 19 Recordings. The band renamed itself Sons of Sylvia in October 2009.

Sons of Sylvia appeared on the song "What Can I Say" on Carrie Underwood's third album, Play On. The band had a connection with Underwood through Ashley, who toured with Carrie as her fiddle player from 2005 to 2009. The band performed "What Can I Say" with Carrie Underwood on December 7, 2009, on Carrie Underwood: An All Star Holiday Special. Sons of Sylvia also joined Carrie on her 2010 "Play On Tour". The band performed their debut single, "Love Left to Lose," on the April 28, 2010 results show episode of American Idol and were introduced by Carrie Underwood.

The group are cousins to Ryan Tedder, lead singer for OneRepublic, who co-wrote and produced the group's debut single, "Love Left to Lose". The album's second single, "I'll Know You", was released to radio in late 2010 but did not chart. In February 2012, Sons Of Sylvia were dropped from Interscope Records. Ashley signed with I.R.S. Records as a solo artist in 2015. Ashley Clark was dropped in mid December 2015 when I.R.S. Records ceased trading.

== Discography ==
=== Studio albums ===
Title	Album details	Peak chart positions	
Title	Album details	US	US Rock
Revelation	Release date: April 27, 2010; Label: Interscope Records; Formats: CD, music download	33	9

=== Singles ===
Year	Single	Peak chart positions		Album
Year	Single	US Bubbling	US Adult	Album
2010	"Love Left to Lose"	1	32	Revelation
2010	"I'll Know You"	—	—	Revelation
"—" denotes releases that did not chart

=== Music videos ===
Year	Video	Director
2010	"Love Left to Lose"	Wayne Isham
2010	"I'll Know You"	David McClister

== Other appearances ==
Year	Song(s)	Album/Program	Notes
2009	"What Can I Say"	Play On	with Carrie Underwood
2012	"Born This Way", and "Heard It Through the Grapevine"	American Idol	Two of the brothers (on fiddle and guitar) accompanied Skylar Laine's Wednesday, April 18, 2012, performances
