= Every Time You Take Your Time =

2020 single by Aaron Goodvin

Single by Aaron Goodvin

from the album V
- Released: July 18, 2020
- Genre: Country
- Length: 3:06
- Label: Warner Canada
- Songwriter(s): Aaron Goodvin; Ed Hill; Jimmy Ritchey
- Producer(s): Aaron Goodvin; Matt McClure

Aaron Goodvin singles chronology
"Good Ol' Bad Days" (2020)	"Every Time You Take Your Time" (2020)	"Lonely Drum" (2021)

Music video
- "Every Time You Take Your Time" on YouTube

"Every Time You Take Your Time" is a song recorded, co-written, and co-produced by Canadian-American country artist Aaron Goodvin. He wrote the track with Ed Hill and Jimmy Ritchey. It was the fourth single off his second studio album V.

== Background ==
"Every Time You Take Your Time" was inspired by Goodvin's wife Victoria.

== Critical reception ==
Nanci Dagg of Canadian Beats Media said that "hearing the lyrics to this romantic love ballad you can’t help but realize the love they have for each other", referring to Goodvin and his wife, adding that the "song is truly written from his heart".

== Commercial performance ==
"Every Time You Take Your Time" reached a peak of #15 on the Billboard Canada Country chart dated March 20, 2021, becoming Goodvin's sixth career Top 20 hit.

== Music video ==
The official music video for "Every Time You Take Your Time" premiered on ET Canada on August 27, 2020, and was directed by Sean Hagwell. It stars both Goodvin and his wife Victoria, with Goodvin adding it was "the perfect time to give her the spotlight.

== Charts ==
Chart (2021)	Peak position
Canada Country (Billboard)	15
