= Lonely Drum =

2017 song by Aaron Goodvin

Single by Aaron Goodvin

from the album Aaron Goodvin
- Released: August 4, 2017 (Note: "Lonely Drum" was re-released as a single to country radio in the United States on February 16, 2021. It received a second release to U.S. country radio on July 19, 2021.)
- Genre: Country
- Length: 3:42
- Label: Warner Canada; Reviver
- Songwriter(s): Aaron Goodvin; Skip Black; Catt Gravitt
- Producer(s): Aaron Goodvin; Matt McClure

Aaron Goodvin singles chronology
"Woman in Love" (2016)	"Lonely Drum" (2017)	"Miss Me Yet" (2018)

Music video
- "Lonely Drum" on YouTube

US radio single cover

Aaron Goodvin singles chronology
"Every Time You Take Your Time" (2020)	"Lonely Drum" (2021)	"Boy Like Me" (2021)

"Lonely Drum" is a song co-written and recorded by Canadian-American country artist Aaron Goodvin. It was the second single from Goodvin's debut self-titled studio album. Goodvin and his co-writers won "Songwriter of the Year" at the 2018 CCMA Awards for the song.

== Background ==
Goodvin and co-writer Catt Gravitt were writing a song called "Trying to Forget You", and after finishing it, Gravitt said "I just love that song because it beats on that lonely drum". Goodvin remarked that he immediately wanted to write a song with that title, "Lonely Drum", and it took them around 45 minutes to complete it. He said that after three years of pitching the song, he recorded it himself, and was very happy with the reaction from fans and radio stations.

== Commercial performance ==
"Lonely Drum" reached a peak of #8 on the Billboard Canada Country chart., and #95 on the Canadian Hot 100. It has been certified Double Platinum by Music Canada. It reached a peak of #45 on the US Country Indicator chart.

== Music video ==
The official music video for "Lonely Drum" premiered on July 26, 2017. Due to the song's popularity, its lyric video was viewed over a million times on YouTube prior to the release of the official music video.

== Charts ==
Chart (2017–21)	Peak position
Canada (Canadian Hot 100)	95
Canada Country (Billboard)	8
US Country Indicator (Billboard)	45

== Certifications ==
Region	Certification	Certified units/sales
Canada (Music Canada)	2× Platinum	160,000^{‡}
^{‡} Sales+streaming figures based on certification alone.
