= Good Ol' Bad Days =

2020 single by Aaron Goodvin

Single by Aaron Goodvin

from the album V
- Released: January 22, 2020
- Genre: Country
- Length: 3:03
- Label: Warner Canada
- Songwriter(s): Aaron Goodvin; Matt Nolen; Skip Black
- Producer(s): Aaron Goodvin; Matt McClure

Aaron Goodvin singles chronology
| "Bars & Churches" (2019) | "Good Ol' Bad Days" (2020) | "Every Time You Take Your Time" (2020) |

Music video
- "Good Ol' Bad Days" on YouTube

"Good Ol' Bad Days" is a song recorded, co-written, and co-produced by Canadian-American country artist Aaron Goodvin. He wrote the track with Matt Nolen and Skip Black, and co-produced it with Matt McClure. It was the third single off his second studio album V.

== Commercial performance ==
"Good Ol' Bad Days" reached a peak of #9 on the Billboard Canada Country chart dated May 9, 2020, marking Goodvin's fifth career Top 10 hit. It also reached a peak of #98 on the Canadian Hot 100, Goodvin's third charting entry on the all-genre national chart.

== Music video ==
The official music video for "Good Ol' Bad Days" premiered on March 22, 2020. It was directed by Travis Didluck, and shot in Toronto, Ontario.

== Charts ==
| Chart (2020) | Peak position |
|---|---|
| Canada (Canadian Hot 100) | 98 |
| Canada Country (Billboard) | 9 |
