= Mark Goffeney =

American musician (1969–2021)

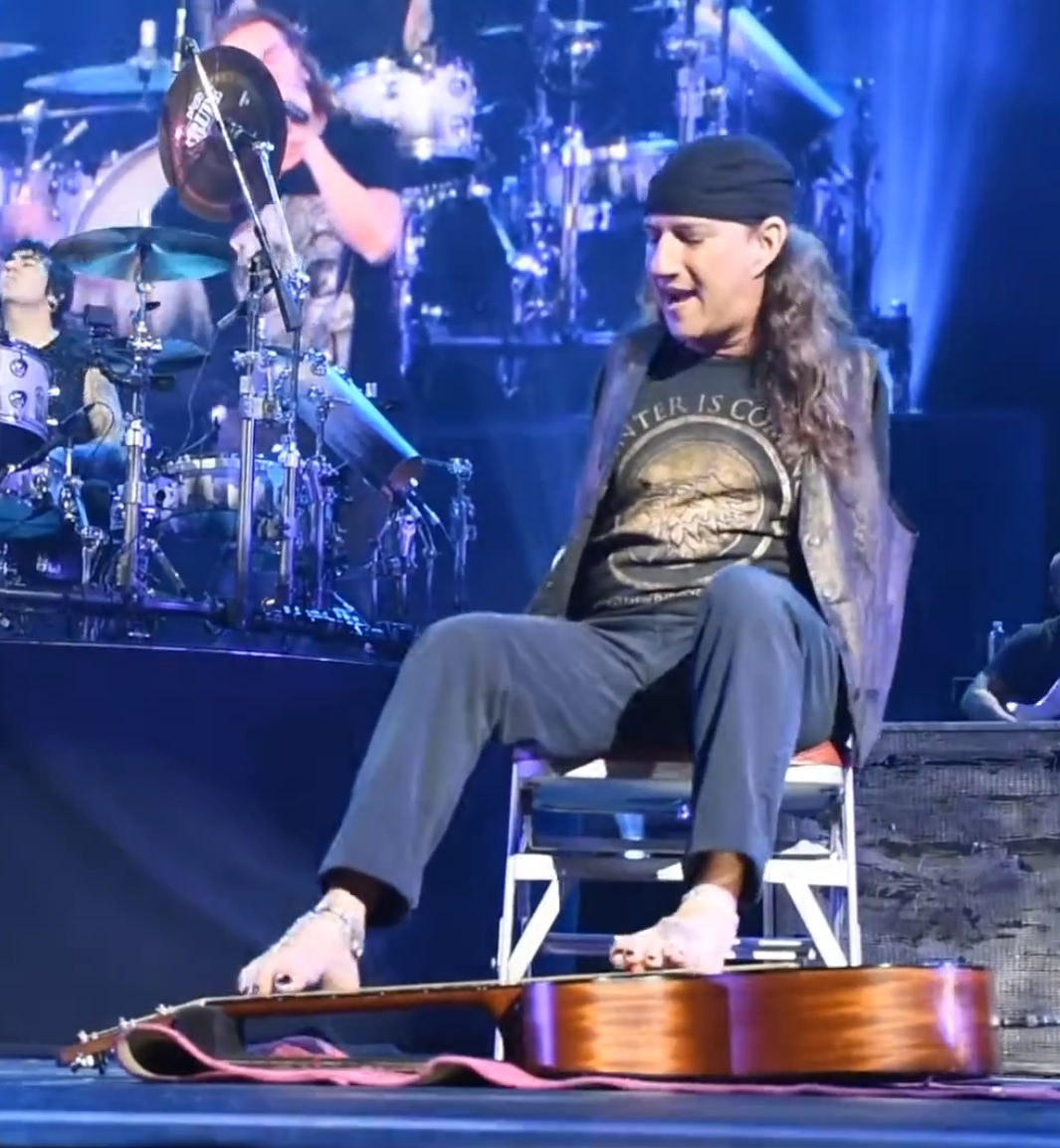
- Goffeney plays with Maná in 2017
- Born: May 22, 1969; San Diego, California, U.S.
- Died: March 2, 2021 (aged 51); El Cajon, California
- Occupation: Musician
- Children: 3

External videos
- Mark Goffeney on Real People w/ Byron Allen on YouTube

Mark Goffeney (May 22, 1969 – March 2, 2021) was an American musician from San Diego, California, known as "Big Toe" because, being born without arms, he played guitar with his feet. He was bassist and vocalist for the 'Big Toe' band and played the principal role on Fox Television's Emmy-nominated commercial 'Feet'.

== Early life ==
Goffeney's mother was British. Starting at age 4, Goffeney appeared on telethons for March of Dimes and Variety Club charities. He interviewed celebrities such as Magic Johnson, Henry Winkler and Prince Charles.

Initially cast to be the son of David Hasselhoff's character on The Young and the Restless but a corporate board decided a character with no arms would be too controversial so he was let go. He felt disheartened by this and decided to concentrate on music.

He played trombone in his school band, but later his father brought home an old guitar (with four strings) that he had found at a garbage dump. Goffeney asked a guitar-playing neighborhood friend for instructions. With his friend's help, Goffeney developed his own technique, learning guitar and bass. He would lay the guitar on the ground, supporting the neck with whatever he could get his feet on. He would strum with his left foot and make chords with his right.

He started a heavy metal band in high school and stated that he acted like a "punk". He attended Grossmont Adult School and Grossmont College.

== Adult career ==
In 1992, he founded the band "Big Toe" with another guitarist, and by the end of the 1990s, had successfully completed his first CD, titled Big Toe, sponsored by PSB Records and produced by Steve Dudas, the former producer for Aerosmith.

He was recognized for his work internationally and was nominated for an Emmy Award in 1999 for his principal role in the Fox Network commercial "Feet" that aired during the Super Bowl in 2000 and 2001.

Goffeney performed on "Lippe blöfft" (ARD TV in Germany) as an opening act for LeAnn Rimes. The station forwarded over 100 emails received the day following the show from viewers wanting Goffeney's CD. To date, CDs have been mailed to fans in Germany, Switzerland and Austria.

'Big Toe' appeared on The Next Great American Band on Fox TV and in StarTomorrow, an online-only musical talent search premiered on NBC and NBC.com on July 31, 2006, competing with 92 bands head-to-head competition on a weekly basis. 'Big Toe' made it to the semi-finals of the competition.

Goffeney was known for busking in Balboa Park and spots around San Diego.

== Big Toe album ==
In 1999, PSB Records signed the band to an album deal on the condition that Goffeney work with Steve Dudas (former producer for Aerosmith, Ozzy Osbourne and Ringo Starr) to refine the songs for the band's self-titled album. At an interview, Goffeney recalled him to be very professional and that at the time, Dudas let him know "in no uncertain terms" that he needed to listen to him.

The album is a collection of Mark Goffeney's original songs. It was featured in the San Diego Reader's "Best of the Best".

== Personal life and death ==
He married AnnMarie Alburg in 1988 and had three children shortly after high school. They were divorced but reunited many years later after Mark raised the children on his own.

On March 2, 2021, both Goffeney and his ex-wife AnnMarie were found dead in their home in El Cajon. A spokesman for the El Cajon Police Department said there were no signs of foul play. Their daughter, Amanda Goffeney, posted on the official Big Toe website that the cause was an accidental fentanyl overdose.
