= Love (Jana Kramer song) =

Single by Jana Kramer

from the album Thirty One
- Released: June 9, 2014
- Genre: Country
- Length: 3:26
- Label: Warner Music Nashville
- Songwriters: Catt Gravitt; Jimmy Robbins
- Producer: Scott Hendricks

Jana Kramer singles chronology
"I Hope It Rains" (2013)	"Love" (2014)	"I Got the Boy" (2015)

Music video
- "Love" on YouTube

"Love" is a song recorded by American country music artist Jana Kramer from her second studio album, Thirty One (2015). The song was written by Catt Gravitt and Jimmy Robbins, and produced by Scott Hendricks. It was released on June 9, 2014 as the album's first single.

== Music video ==
The music video was directed by Ryan Lassan and premiered in June 2014. Kramer filmed the video in Honduras along with her charity, Hearts2Honduras, which helps bring English tutors to Honduras, as well as helping to house and feed Hondurans. When speaking of her song "Love", Kramer said, "I’m just focused now on spreading love", and that "...there’s so much hate in the world, and I don’t think we focus on the love in the world enough...There really is a lot of love out there and I think if we spotlight that more, people will have more love in their lives in general.”

== Critical reception ==
Vickye Fisher of forthecountryrecord.com notes that the song has a "fresh approach", and is distinctive because of its "simplicity and catchy hook". It features prominent vocals and simple lyrics, is short and concise, yet is sung "with passion and conviction". Its upbeat tone creates "a positivity lingering in the air long after the song is over", and will "encourage listeners to want to play it again".

== Chart performance ==
Chart (2014)	Peak position
US Country Airplay (Billboard)	32
US Hot Country Songs (Billboard)	37
