= Approaching Midnight =

- Directed by: Sam Logan Khaleghi
- Written by: Sam Logan Khaleghi
- Produced by: Sam Logan Khaleghi
- Starring: Jana Kramer; Sam Logan Khaleghi; Brandon T. Jackson; Mia Serafino
- Cinematography: Carl Ballou
- Edited by: Matthew Childs
- Music by: James Stonehouse
- Production company: 12 AM Pictures
- Distributed by: Monterey Media
- Release date: August 30, 2013
- Country: United States
- Language: English

Approaching Midnight is a 2013 American independent drama film directed, written, and produced by Sam Logan Khaleghi, and starring Jana Kramer, Sam Logan Khaleghi, Brandon T. Jackson, and Mia Serafino. Approaching Midnight was filmed in Michigan, United States.

== Premise ==
A U.S. Army staff sergeant (Sam Logan Khaleghi) fights the threat of corruption and deception in his hometown after returning from battle.

== Cast ==
- Jana Kramer.... Aspen
- Sam Logan Khaleghi.... Staff Sergeant Wesley Kent
- Brandon T Jackson.... Corporal Artie AJ Culpepper
- Mia Serafino.... Whisper
- Jeff Stetson.... Mayor Steven Malverne
- Patrick Sarniak.... Malverne's Attorney

== Production ==
=== Development ===
Approaching Midnight is directed, written, and directed by Sam Logan Khaleghi. Khaleghi chose to film Approaching Midnight in Michigan because he loves the state and wanted to feature the amazing architecture and geography. American Legion members were a part of making the film as they stood in as extras and an American Legion honor guard appears in the film.

=== Filming ===
Approaching Midnight was filmed in Detroit, Farmington, and West Bloomfield, Michigan. The war sequences in the movie were filmed in Milan near Ann Arbor.

== Release ==
In July 2013, Monterey Media bought the United States distribution rights and will release the film in the United States in Fall 2013. Approaching Midnight had its world theatrical premiere on August 27, 2013 at Emagine Royal Oak. The film was also released at the American Legion National Convention in Houston, Texas.
