= Bars & Churches =

2019 single by Aaron Goodvin

Single by Aaron Goodvin

from the album V
- Released: February 12, 2019
- Genre: Country
- Length: 3:43
- Label: Warner Canada; Reviver
- Songwriter(s): Aaron Goodvin; Ben Stennis
- Producer(s): Aaron Goodvin; Matt McClure

Aaron Goodvin singles chronology
"You Are" (2018)	"Bars & Churches" (2019)	"Good Ol' Bad Days" (2020)

Music video
- "Bars & Churches" on YouTube

"Bars & Churches" is a song co-written and recorded by Canadian-American country artist Aaron Goodvin. It was the second single from Goodvin's second studio album V.

== Background ==
Goodvin co-wrote the song with Ben Stennis. He stated that the first line of the chorus, "there's one on every corner", came from "talking about Nashville and talking about how there's either a bar or church everywhere". Goodvin added "this is a song that pretty much got me a record deal in the States. It's really about community and finding out where you belong and sometimes you can find that in either of those places with different people and I think that's a really special thing". It marked his first single release in the United States after signing with Reviver Records, and his second country radio single there after "Woman in Love" in 2016.

== Critical reception ==
Top Country named the song their "Pick of the Week" for July 17, 2019, calling it "thoughtful, emotional and impactful", adding "it's one of those songs that stops you in your tracks after the first line". Complete Country stated "this tune takes listeners on more of an emotional journey than his previous singles".

== Commercial performance ==
"Bars & Churches" reached a peak of number 15 on the Billboard Canada Country chart, marking Goodvin's first single to not reach the top ten there. It also peaked at number 46 on the US Country Indicator chart, and was his first charting single in the United States.

== Music video ==
The official music video for "Bars & Churches" premiered on May 2, 2019. It was directed by Ben Knechtel.

== Charts ==
Chart (2019)	Peak position
Canada Country (Billboard)	15
US Country Indicator (Billboard)	46
