= Mike Caussin =

American football player (born 1987)

No. 83
- Position: Tight end

Personal information
- Born: February 26, 1987 (age 39); Springfield, Virginia, U.S.
- Listed height: 6 ft 5 in (1.96 m)
- Listed weight: 252 lb (114 kg)

Career information
- High school: West Springfield
- College: James Madison (2005–2009)
- NFL draft: 2010: undrafted

Career history
- Jacksonville Jaguars (2010)*; Buffalo Bills (2010−2013); Washington Redskins (2014)*
- * Offseason or practice squad member only

Career NFL statistics
- Receptions: 5
- Receiving yards: 41
- Stats at Pro Football Reference

Michael Caussin (born February 26, 1987) is an American former professional football player who was a tight end in the National Football League (NFL). He was signed by the Jacksonville Jaguars as an undrafted free agent in 2010. He played college football for the James Madison Dukes.

He was also a member of the Buffalo Bills and Washington Redskins.

== Early life and college ==
Caussin was born in Springfield, Virginia. He attended West Springfield High School and has a younger brother, Jack. Following his high school graduation, Caussin attended James Madison University in Harrisonburg, Virginia, majoring in kinesiology with a sports management concentration.

== Professional career ==
=== Jacksonville Jaguars ===
Caussin was signed by the Jacksonville Jaguars as an undrafted free agent in 2010. He was cut on September 4, 2010, but was signed to the Jaguars' practice squad on September 5, 2010.

=== Buffalo Bills ===
The Buffalo Bills signed Caussin off the Jaguars' practice squad on December 1, 2010. On August 14, 2013, he was waived by the Bills. On the next day, he cleared waivers and was placed on the Bills' injured reserve list.

On March 11, 2014, Caussin was re-signed by the Bills. He was waived on July 16.

=== Washington Redskins ===
The Washington Redskins signed Caussin on July 21, 2014. He was placed on the injured reserve on August 24.

== Personal life ==
Caussin began dating actress and country singer Jana Kramer in August 2014, whom he met on Twitter. The couple became engaged on December 2, 2014, Kramer's 31st birthday. The two were married on May 22, 2015. On August 10, 2015, the couple revealed they were expecting their first child, a girl. Their daughter, Jolie Rae Caussin, was born on January 31, 2016, in Nashville. By August 2016, Kramer and Caussin had separated in the midst of Caussin's cheating and admission into rehab for sex addiction. They reconciled the following year and renewed their wedding vows in December 2017. In June 2018, Jana revealed they were expecting their second child, a boy. Their son, Jace Joseph Caussin, was born on November 29, 2018.

On April 20, 2021, Kramer filed for divorce from Caussin, citing "inappropriate marital conduct, irreconcilable differences and adultery". Two days after the pair split, a temporary restraining order was issued by the Williamson County, Tennessee court.

On May 20, 2021, it was reported that Kramer and Caussin reached an agreement with custody and child support. According to the documents, Kramer was awarded primary custody of Jolie and Jace. She will have the children 240 days out of the year, while Caussin will have them for the remaining 125 days. In addition, Kramer is to pay Caussin $3,200 per month in child support. The divorce was finalized on July 22, 2021.
