= Jana Kramer (album) =

Studio album by Jana Kramer
- Released: June 5, 2012
- Genre: Country
- Length: 37:32
- Label: Elektra Nashville
- Producer: Scott Hendricks

Jana Kramer chronology
| Jana Kramer (2012) | Thirty One (2015) |

Singles from Jana Kramer
- 1. "Why Ya Wanna" Released: January 16, 2012; 2. "Whiskey" Released: November 5, 2012; 3. "I Hope It Rains" Released: May 20, 2013

Jana Kramer is the debut studio album by American actress and country music artist Jana Kramer. It was released on June 5, 2012 via Elektra Records. The album was produced by Scott Hendricks. Its first single, "Why Ya Wanna," was released in January 2012. It also includes the previously released digital singles "Whiskey" and "What I Love About Your Love" and "I Won't Give Up" as a digital bonus track.

== Background ==
In 2002, Kramer made her acting debut in the low budget independent horror film Dead/Undead. The following year Kramer guest appeared on All My Children which was marked as Kramer's television debut. Kramer has since continued to appear in a number of television shows such as CSI: Crime Scene Investigation, Grey's Anatomy, Private Practice and CSI: NY. She has also had small supporting roles in films such as Click, Prom Night and Spring Breakdown. After a long career of acting, in February 2011 Kramer signed a recording contract with Elektra Records. The following month Kramer began work on her debut album. Country music producer Scott Hendricks produced the majority of the record.

== Singles ==
On January 16, 2012, Kramer released her official debut single, "Why Ya Wanna". Kramer premiered the official music video directed by Kristin Barlowe on February 6, 2012. The song peaked at number 50 on the US Billboard Hot 100 chart and number 3 on the US Billboard Hot Country Songs chart, as well as number 100 on Billboard's Canadian Hot 100. "Whiskey" was released as the album's second single on November 5, 2012.

=== Promotional songs ===
She premiered her promo track, "I Won't Give Up", which premiered in the One Tree Hill episode "Holding Out for a Hero", was released the following day exclusively on iTunes and Amazon. The song reached number 75 on the US Billboard Hot 100 chart. In April 2011 Kramer released another promo track titled, "Whiskey" which she also performed on One Tree Hill. The song reached number 99 on the US Billboard Hot 100 chart on digital sales alone.

== Reception ==
Professional ratings
Review scores
| Source | Rating |
|---|---|
| Roughstock | 4.5/5 stars |
| Taste of Country | 4/5 stars |

=== Critical ===
Giving it four-and-a-half stars out of five, Roughstock writer Matt Bjorke said that Kramer "adds a potent vocal and burgeoning songwriting talent on top of her model looks". Taste of Country writer Billy Dukes gave it four stars, saying that "It’s clear Kramer had an idea of who she was as a singer before stepping into the recording studio." James Christopher Monger of Allmusic thought that the album "does a nice job blending the contemporary twang of artists like Carrie Underwood and Taylor Swift with the traditionalist spirit of classic country and folk crooners like Patsy Cline and James Taylor."

=== Commercial ===
The album debuted at No. 5 on the Top Country Albums and No. 19 on Billboard 200 upon its release in the US, selling 16,000 copies for the week. The album has sold 185,000 copies in the US as of September 2015.

== Track listing ==
| No. | Title | Writer(s) | Length |
|---|---|---|---|
| 1. | "Good Time Comin' On" | Jessi Alexander; Jim Beavers | 3:25 |
| 2. | "I Hope It Rains" | Jerry Flowers; Kelley Lovelace; Rachel Proctor | 3:07 |
| 3. | "Why Ya Wanna" | Chris DeStefano; Ashley Gorley; Catt Gravitt | 3:41 |
| 4. | "Goodbye California" | Jana Kramer; Gravitt; Josh Crosby; Lesley Roy | 3:58 |
| 5. | "Whiskey" | Gravitt; Sam Mizell | 3:36 |
| 6. | "Over You by Now" | Katrina Elam; Gordie Sampson; Troy Verges | 3:59 |
| 7. | "One of the Boys" | Kramer; Ross Copperman; Jon Nite | 2:49 |
| 8. | "What I Love About Your Love" | Skip Black; Brian Dean Maher; Laura Veltz | 2:58 |
| 9. | "When You're Lonely" | Lynn Hutton; Tammi Kidd | 3:31 |
| 10. | "King of Apology" | Jennifer Hanson; Mallary Hope; Jennifer Schott | 2:50 |
| 11. | "Good as You Were Bad" | Hutton; Ashley Ray | 3:37 |

Digital bonus track
| No. | Title | Writer(s) | Length |
|---|---|---|---|
| 12. | "I Won't Give Up" | Kramer; Kye Fleming; Jess Leary | 3:18 |

== Personnel ==
- Stephanie Bentley – background vocals
- Tom Bukovac – electric guitar
- Joshua Crosby – synthesizer
- Eric Darken – percussion
- Dan Dugmore – dobro, pedal steel guitar
- Shannon Forrest – drums, percussion
- Paul Franklin – dobro, pedal steel guitar
- Catt Gravitt – background vocals
- Tania Hercheroff – background vocals
- Aubrey Haynie – fiddle, mandolin
- Carolyn Dawn Johnson – background vocals
- Charlie Judge – keyboards, string arrangements
- Jana Kramer – lead vocals
- Troy Lancaster – electric guitar
- Gordon Mote – Hammond B-3 organ, piano, synthesizer, Wurlitzer
- Cherie Oakley – background vocals
- Carole Rabinowitz – cello
- Jimmie Lee Sloas – bass guitar
- Bryan Sutton – acoustic guitar
- Russell Terrell – background vocals
- Ilya Toshinsky – banjo, acoustic guitar
- Glenn Worf – bass guitar

== Charts ==
=== Weekly charts ===
| Chart (2012) | Peak position |
|---|---|
| US Billboard 200 | 19 |
| US Top Country Albums (Billboard) | 5 |

=== Year-end charts ===
| Chart (2012) | Position |
|---|---|
| US Top Country Albums (Billboard) | 56 |
| Chart (2013) | Position |
| US Top Country Albums (Billboard) | 59 |

=== Singles ===
| Year | Single | Peak chart positions | | | | |
| Year | Single | US Country | US Country Airplay | US | CAN Country | CAN |
|---|---|---|---|---|---|---|
| 2012 | "Why Ya Wanna" | 3 | 3 | 50 | — | 100 |
| 2012 | "Whiskey" | 27 | 25 | 94 | 47 | 88 |
| 2013 | "I Hope It Rains" | — | 42 | — | — | — |
"—" denotes releases that did not chart
