= The Next Great American Band =

- Created by: Simon Fuller
- Presented by: Dominic Bowden
- Judges: Ian Dickson; Sheila E. John Rzeznik
- Country of origin: United States
- No. of seasons: 1
- No. of episodes: 10

Production
- Executive producers: Nigel Lythgoe; Ken Warwick
- Running time: 120 minutes (first three episodes); 60 minutes (subsequent episodes)
- Production companies: 19 Entertainment; FremantleMedia North America

Original release
- Network: Fox
- Release: October 19 – December 21, 2007

The Next Great American Band is a reality television talent show. The show premiered on October 19, 2007 and aired on Fox at 8 p.m. Eastern and Pacific times Friday nights. The show was taped at CBS Television City in Los Angeles on Wednesday evenings in Studio 36, which is the same studio used for American Idol.

The program was created by 19 Entertainment, which is one of the companies behind American Idol, and the show shared the same basic concept as Idol. This time, however, the winner was not a singer but instead a musical band. The contest was open to performers of all genres of music, and there were no age limits for the performers. The three judges were Australian Idol judge Ian "Dicko" Dickson, Sheila E., and John Rzeznik of The Goo Goo Dolls. Dickson served as a judge on Australian Idol concurrently. The host of the show was New Zealand Idol host Dominic Bowden.

In promotional announcements that aired on the final episodes of So You Think You Can Dance, another 19 creation, the title was given one night as American Band, then the next night as The Next Great American Band. The show was officially announced May 16, 2007 at the American Idol website and Fox announced the pickup the next day.

On May 15, 2008, a year after the show was announced, the series was officially cancelled due to poor ratings. The eventual winners, The Clark Brothers (later renamed Sons of Sylvia ) disbanded in 2012.

== Auditions ==
Over 6000 bands sent in audition tapes. 60 bands from around the country were chosen to participate in a judging session that took place at the Montelago Resort in Lake Las Vegas, Nevada on August 19–25, 2007. While most of these 60 bands were flown straight to Las Vegas as 'gimmick' acts, the ones being seriously considered for the show participated in a round of regional auditions and then auditions in Los Angeles before advancing to Las Vegas. Twelve of these forty acts were chosen by show producers and judges to become semifinalist acts to compete against each other in the main season of the show beginning October 19. Again, the show resembled Idol at this point, with telephone and text message votes deciding the winner. There was no results show after the live performance. In each episode, the results were shown in the green room. The two bands (one in later episodes) with the lowest votes were forced to perform in the green room via the internet. Unlike American Idol, however, the final episode was a winner-takes-all showdown between the top three bands, not two. The results were shown live in the grand finale and the host only presented the winner to the viewing audience right after the final commercial break.

The audition rounds of the show were kept very secretive by the producers, and thus caused some controversy between bands who had sent in audition tapes. Many online forums and chat rooms were full of bands falsely stating they had been selected to appear on the show, and further confused hopefuls by posting several versions of the rules, contracts, and audition details.

== Top 12 ==
Place	Band	Round 1 (10/26)	Round 2 (11/2)	Round 3 (11/9)	Round 4 (11/16)	Round 5 (11/23)	Round 6 (11/30)	Round 7 (12/7)	Round 8 (12/14)	Round 9 (12/21)
Place	Band	Bob Dylan^{1}	Elton John & Bernie Taupin^{1}	Billy Joel^{2}	Jerry Leiber & Mike Stoller^{2}	The Rolling Stones^{2}	Rod Stewart^{2}	Queen^{1}	None^{3}	Results Show^{4}
1	The Clark Brothers	"Maggie's Farm"; "Billy the Kid" (original)	"Country Comfort"; "Country Time" (original)	"She's Got a Way"	"Saved"	"Gimme Shelter"	"You're in My Heart (The Final Acclaim)"	"These Are the Days of Our Lives"; "Homestead" (original)	"Change the World"; "Amazed"; "This Little Light of Mine / Faith, Faith, Faith" (original)	Next Great American Band
2	Sixwire	"Mr. Tambourine Man"; "Good to Be Back" (original)	"Don't Let the Sun Go Down On Me"; "Gotta Get Away" (original)	"She's Always A Woman"	"I Keep Forgettin'"	"The Last Time"	"Hot Legs"	"Fat Bottomed Girls"; "Go On" (original)	"Reelin' in the Years"; "I'd Really Love to See You Tonight"; "Good to Be Back" (original)	Eliminated on 12/21^{5}
3	Denver and the Mile High Orchestra	"Freight Train Blues"; "One Time Show" (original)	"I'm Still Standing"; "All Night" (original)	"Tell Her About It"	"Ruby Baby"	"I'm Free"	"Baby Jane"	"Sleeping on the Sidewalk"; "Big White House" (original)	"September"; "Vehicle"; "You Move Me" (original)	Eliminated on 12/21^{5}
4	Light of Doom	"All Along the Watchtower"; "Eye of the Storm" (original)	"Saturday Night's Alright for Fighting"; "Light of Doom" (original)	"The Stranger"	"Jailhouse Rock"	"Jumpin' Jack Flash"	"Infatuation"	'We Will Rock You"; "Matter of Time" (original)	Eliminated on 12/14^{5}	
5	Dot Dot Dot	"Like a Rolling Stone"; "Another Stupid Love Song" (original)	"Your Song"; "Stay" (original)	"Pressure"	"Love Potion No. 9"	"Let's Spend the Night Together"	"Young Turks"	Eliminated on 12/07^{5}		
6	Très bien!	"Subterranean Homesick Blues"; "Easy to Love Me" (original)	"Love Lies Bleeding"; "How I Feel" (original)	"Movin' Out"	"Some Other Guy"	"Get off of My Cloud"	Eliminated on 11/30^{5}			
7	Cliff Wagner and the Old #7	"Don't Think Twice, It's All Right"; "Old Fire" (original)	"Honky Cat"; "Little White Chapel" (original)	"You May Be Right"	"Poison Ivy"	Eliminated on 11/23^{5}				
8	Franklin Bridge	"Tangled Up in Blue"; "Incredible" (original)	"Philadelphia Freedom"; "Love's Fool" (original)	"Big Shot"	Eliminated on 11/16^{5}					
9	Rocket	"Knockin’ on Heaven’s Door"; "Mean to You" (original)	"Rocket Man"; "Future Ex-Boyfriend" (original)	Eliminated on 11/09^{5}						
10	The Muggs	"Meet Me in the Morning"; "Slow Curve" (original)	"I Guess That's Why They Call It the Blues"; "Should've Learned My Lesson" (original)	Eliminated on 11/09^{5}						
11	The Hatch	"It's All Over Now, Baby Blue"; "Stretch Out the Time" (original)	Eliminated on 11/02^{5}							
12	The Likes of You	"Blowin' in the Wind"; "Love and Gravity" (original)	Eliminated on 11/02^{5}							

^Note 1: Each band performed an original song and a cover of a song by the theme artist.
^Note 2: The bands only performed a cover of a song by the artist listed above.
^Note 3: The bands played a song chosen by the judges, a song chosen by the producers and a song they chose.
^Note 4: In the final episode the bands did not perform any theme, but chose songs to showcase their band.
^Note 5: The elimination date is the date of broadcast of the show where the elimination was announced. The actual elimination in each case occurred two days earlier, when the show was taped.

== Other participating bands ==
The following is a list of bands who did not make it to the Top 12. These bands were either seen on Episode 1 (the Vegas auditions) or are featured on the official website:

- Ballroom Dancing
- The Van-Dells
- The Daytime Soap Stars
- waketheday
- The 440 Alliance
- The Queue
- Fat Shitty Surprise
- Blackbird
- BoTcHED
- Faces Without Names
- Mezcal
- Nothing More
- Northmont
- The Early Republic
- The Dirty Marmaduke Flute Squad
- Gothic Heavy Metal

- Zombie Bazooka Patrol
- Simply Sick
- Fifi LaRue
- The Groovin Grannies
- Just Live
- Starchild
- Red Halo
- Honky Stomp
- The Cat's Pajamas

- El Toro's League
- J.I.Z.
- Big Provider
- Viva Las Jablonski
- Zolar X
- The Sizzling Happy Family
- Sunset West

- Lexicon
- Dova Grove
- The Fabulous Johnson Brothers
- The Big Toe
- Heaven Bound
- Thirteen Stars
- Potential Difference

== Nielsen ratings ==
No.	Air Date	Rating	Share	18-49 (Rating/Share)	Viewers (m)	Rank		
No.	Air Date	Rating	Share	18-49 (Rating/Share)	Viewers (m)	Night	Timeslot	Overall
1	October 19, 2007	2.1	4	1.5/5	3.57	9	5	83/97
2	October 26, 2007	1.8	3	1.2/4	2.89	10	5	87/97
3	November 2, 2007	1.4	3	1.0/3	2.31	11	5	92/100
4	November 9, 2007	1.8	3	1.0/4	2.69	12	5	91/101
5	November 16, 2007	1.7	3	1.1/4	2.57	12	5	94/101
6	November 23, 2007	1.6	3	1.1/3	2.61	10	5	83/95
7	November 30, 2007	1.5	3	0.9/3	2.16	10	5	92/98
8	December 7, 2007	1.9	3	1.2/4	3.04	12	5	87/102
9	December 14, 2007	1.8	3	1.1/3	3.14	9	4	84/98
10	December 21, 2007	1.8	3	1.0/3	2.64	10	5	89/100
