= Thirty One (Jana Kramer album) =

Studio album by Jana Kramer
- Released: October 9, 2015
- Recorded: 2014–15
- Genre: Country
- Label: Warner Music Nashville
- Producer: Scott Hendricks

Jana Kramer chronology
| Jana Kramer (2012) | Thirty One (2015) |

Singles from Thirty One
- 1. "Love" Released: June 9, 2014; 2. "I Got the Boy" Released: March 30, 2015; 3. "Said No One Ever" Released: March 21, 2016; 4. "Circles" Released: July 18, 2016

Thirty One is the second studio album by American actress and country music singer Jana Kramer. It was released on October 9, 2015. It became available for preorder on August 27, 2015 on iTunes, the same day the track list was revealed.

== Background ==
On the album's title, Kramer explained, "I want this title to be strong; I want this title to be me. I want this title to somehow portray the woman that I am. There's no other way of saying that than 'Thirty One.'"

== Critical reception ==
Giving it a "B", Bob Paxman of Nash Country Weekly thought that "The songs here are mostly good, but it's hard to discern a real identity from the album as a whole." He thought that the first two singles, plus "Boomerang" and "Said No One Ever", were the strongest cuts.

== Commercial performance ==
The album debuted at No. 3 on Top Country Albums, and No. 10 on the Billboard 200, with 18,000 copies sold in the US in the first week. It sold a further 5,000 copies in its second week. The album has sold 79,000 copies in the US as of October 2016.

== Track listing ==
| No. | Title | Writer(s) | Length |
|---|---|---|---|
| 1. | "Boomerang" | Chad Carson; Taylor Dye; Maddie Marlow; Aaron Scherz | 3:43 |
| 2. | "Don't Touch My Radio" | Jana Kramer; Blair Daly; Catt Gravitt | 2:46 |
| 3. | "I Got the Boy" | Connie Harrington; Tim Nichols; Jamie Lynn Spears | 3:21 |
| 4. | "Pop That Bottle" | Kramer; Phil Barton; Mike Hughes; Lindsay Rimes | 3:06 |
| 5. | "Love" | Gravitt; Jimmy Robbins | 3:26 |
| 6. | "Circles" | Alyssa Bonagura; Brandon Hood; Jeffrey Steele | 3:59 |
| 7. | "Bullet" (featuring Steven Tyler) | Kramer; Gravitt; Marti Frederiksen | 2:51 |
| 8. | "Dance in the Rain" | Kramer; Barton; Rimes; Emily Shackleton | 3:26 |
| 9. | "Said No One Ever" | busbee; Nicolle Galyon; Natalie Hemby | 2:53 |
| 10. | "Just Like in the Movies" | Kramer; Gravitt; Brian Keirulf | 3:09 |
| 11. | "Last Song" | Kramer; Gravitt; Robbins | 3:11 |

Thirty One – Target Deluxe Edition (bonus tracks)
| No. | Title | Writer(s) | Length |
|---|---|---|---|
| 12. | "Dealbreaker" | Kramer; Barton; Gravitt | 2:40 |
| 13. | "All I've Got" | Kramer; Robbins; Jon Nite | 3:36 |
| 14. | "Why Ya Wanna" | Gravitt; Chris DeStefano; Ashley Gorley | 3:42 |
| 15. | "I Won't Give Up" | Kramer; Kye Fleming; Jess Leary | 3:20 |

== Personnel ==
- Brent Anderson – banjo, acoustic guitar, mandolin
- Jeff Balding – engineer
- Drew Bollman – production assistant
- Matt Coles – assistant engineer
- Shannon Forrest – drums, percussion
- Paul Franklin – steel guitar, Dobro
- Catt Gravitt – background vocals
- Scott Hendricks – digital editing, editing, engineering, production
- Carolyn Dawn Johnson – engineering, background vocals
- Scott Johnson – production assistant
- Charlie Judge – Hammond B-3 organ, piano, synthesizer
- Jana Kramer – lead vocals, acoustic guitar
- Troy Lancaster – electric guitar
- Jerry McPherson – electric guitar
- Andrew Mendelson – mastering
- Gordon Mote – Hammond B3, piano
- Justin Niebank – mixing
- Katherine Petillo – art direction, design
- Ben Simonetti – assistant engineer
- Jimmie Lee Sloas – bass guitar
- Bryan Sutton – acoustic guitar
- Shane Tarleton – creative director
- Steven Tyler – duet vocals on "Bullet"
- Derek Wells – electric guitar
- Brian David Willis – digital editing
- Nir Z. – drums, percussion

== Charts ==
=== Weekly charts ===
| Chart (2015) | Peak position |
|---|---|
| US Billboard 200 | 10 |
| US Top Country Albums (Billboard) | 3 |

=== Year-end charts ===
| Chart (2015) | Position |
|---|---|
| US Top Country Albums (Billboard) | 75 |
| Chart (2016) | Position |
| US Top Country Albums (Billboard) | 55 |

=== Singles ===
| Year | Single | Peak chart positions | | | | | Sales |
| Year | Single | US Country | US Country Airplay | US | CAN Country | CAN | Sales |
|---|---|---|---|---|---|---|---|
| 2014 | "Love" | 37 | 32 | — | — | — | |
| 2015 | "I Got the Boy" | 5 | 6 | 56 | 22 | 85 | US: 528,000 |
| 2016 | "Said No One Ever" | — | 57 | — | — | — | |
| 2016 | "Circles" | 47 | 55 | — | — | — | |
"—" denotes releases that did not chart
