= Aaron Goodvin =

Canadian-American country music singer

- Born: Aaron Jakob Goodvin; August 20, 1985 (age 41); Spirit River, Alberta, Canada
- Origin: Nashville, Tennessee, U.S.
- Genre: Country
- Occupation: Singer-songwriter
- Instrument: Vocals
- Years active: 2016–present
- Labels: Warner Music Canada; Reviver Records; Sakamoto Music; Worn Boots; New Motor

Aaron Goodvin is a Canadian-American country music singer and songwriter. Active since 2016, he has charted multiple singles on the Billboard Canada Country charts, including the number-one hits "You Are" and "Boy Like Me", and the double platinum-certified "Lonely Drum".

== Biography ==
Goodvin was born in Spirit River, Alberta, Canada. He took interest in music after winning a singing competition at a local shopping mall at age 12. His family moved to St. Albert, Alberta, by the time he was a teenager. At age 25, Goodvin moved to Nashville, Tennessee, to pursue his career in country music. After performing in local venues, he was signed to a songwriting contract with Warner Chappell Music, which led to him writing the track "Out Like That" on Luke Bryan's 2013 album Crash My Party. Scottish-Canadian country singer Johnny Reid then began mentoring Goodvin and hired him as an opening act. This led to him signing a contract with Warner Music Canada in April 2016.

The label issued Goodvin's self-titled debut album in 2016, which accounted for three entries on the Billboard Canada Country charts. "Lonely Drum", one of the singles, was certified double platinum by Music Canada and received a nomination for Songwriter of the Year at the Canadian Country Music Awards. In 2018, he signed an American record deal with Reviver Records. In 2019, Goodvin released his second album, V, which includes the singles "You Are", "Bars & Churches", "Good Ol' Bad Days", and "Every Time You Take Your Time". The album received a Juno Award nomination for Country Album of the Year at the Juno Awards of 2020.

In 2022, Goodvin signed a new Canadian record deal with Sakamoto Music, and released the single "You Ain't" featuring Meghan Patrick.

== Discography ==
=== Albums ===
| Title | Album details |
|---|---|
| Aaron Goodvin | Release date: April 8, 2016; Label: Warner Music Canada |
| V | Release date: February 15, 2019; Label: Warner Music Canada |

=== Extended plays ===
| Title | Details |
|---|---|
| Lucky Stars | Release date: October 22, 2021; Label: Warner Music Canada / Reviver Records |
| Drinkin' Hand | Release date: June 20, 2025; Label: Sakamoto Music |

=== Singles ===
List of singles, with selected chart positions and certifications
| Year | Single | Peak chart positions | | | Certifications | Album |
| Year | Single | CAN | CAN Country | US Country Indicator | Certifications | Album |
|---|---|---|---|---|---|---|
| 2016 | "Woman in Love" | — | 7 | — | | Aaron Goodvin |
| 2017 | "Lonely Drum" | 95 | 8 | — | MC: 2× Platinum | Aaron Goodvin |
| 2018 | "Miss Me Yet" | — | 9 | — | | Aaron Goodvin |
| 2018 | "You Are" | 96 | 1 | — | MC: Gold | V |
| 2019 | "Bars & Churches" | — | 15 | 46 | | V |
| 2020 | "Good Ol' Bad Days" | 98 | 9 | — | | V |
| 2020 | "Every Time You Take Your Time" | — | 15 | — | | V |
| 2021 | "Lonely Drum" (Note: "Lonely Drum" was re-released as a single to country radio in the United States on February 16, 2021.) | — | — | 45 | | Aaron Goodvin |
| 2021 | "Boy Like Me" | 84 | 1 | 52 | | Lucky Stars |
| 2021 | "Lucky Stars" | — | 15 | — | | Lucky Stars |
| 2022 | "You Ain't" (featuring Meghan Patrick) | — | 15 | — | | Lucky Stars |
| 2023 | "The Longer I Live" (with Ryan Kinder) (Note: "The Longer I Live" was only released as a single to country radio in the United States.) | — | — | * | | Non-album single |
| 2023 | "Country Dance" | — | 20 | * | | Drinkin' Hand |
| 2024 | "Written All Over It" | — | 46 | * | | Drinkin' Hand |
| 2024 | "Your Time to Stay" | — | 32 | * | | Drinkin' Hand |
| 2025 | "Said No Redneck Ever" | — | 42 | * | | Drinkin' Hand |
"—" denotes a recording that did not chart or was not released in that territory. "*" denotes releases where no chart existed

== Awards and nominations ==
| Year | Award | Category | Nominated work | Result | Ref |
|---|---|---|---|---|---|
| 2017 | Canadian Country Music Association | Rising Star Award | Aaron Goodvin | Nominated | |
| 2018 | Canadian Country Music Association | Single of the Year | "Lonely Drum" | Nominated | |
| 2018 | Canadian Country Music Association | Rising Star Award | Aaron Goodvin | Nominated | |
| 2018 | Canadian Country Music Association | Songwriter(s) of the Year (with Catt Gravitt) | "Lonely Drum" | Won | |
| 2019 | Canadian Country Music Association | Interactive Artist or Group of the Year | Aaron Goodvin | Nominated | |
| 2020 | Juno Awards | Country Album of the Year | V | Nominated | |
| 2020 | Canadian Country Music Association | Interactive Artist of the Year | Aaron Goodvin | Nominated | |
| 2020 | Canadian Country Music Association | Songwriter(s) Of The Year (shared with Skip Back, Matt Nolen) | "Good Ol’ Bad Days" | Nominated | |
| 2021 | 2021 Canadian Country Music Awards | Interactive Artist of the Year | Aaron Goodvin | Nominated | |
| 2021 | 2021 Canadian Country Music Awards | Songwriter(s) of the Year (shared with Ed Hill, Jimmy Ritchey) | "Every Time You Take Your Time" | Nominated | |
| 2022 | Canadian Country Music Association | Interactive Artist or Group of the Year | Aaron Goodvin | Nominated | |
| 2022 | Canadian Country Music Association | Single of the Year | "Boy Like Me" | Nominated | |
| 2024 | Canadian Country Music Association | Innovative Campaign of the Year | "Country Dance" Line Dance Campaign | Nominated | |
| 2024 | Canadian Country Music Association | Songwriter(s) of the Year (with Catt Gravitt, Skip Black) | "Country Dance" | Nominated | |
