= Why Ya Wanna =

Single by Jana Kramer

from the album Jana Kramer
- Released: 2012
- Recorded: 2011
- Genre: Country
- Length: 3:41
- Label: Elektra Nashville
- Songwriters: Ashley Gorley; Catt Gravitt; Chris DeStefano
- Producer: Scott Hendricks

Jana Kramer singles chronology
"Why Ya Wanna" (2012)	"Whiskey" (2012)

"Why Ya Wanna" is a song recorded by American actress and country music artist Jana Kramer. It was released in January 2012 as the first single from her self-titled debut album, which was released on June 5. Three years later the song appeared as a bonus track on the Target Exclusive of her second studio album, Thirty One. The song was written by Ashley Gorley, Catt Gravitt and Chris DeStefano.

== Content ==
"Why Ya Wanna" is a mid-tempo song in which the female narrator encounters an ex-lover, and asks him why he "want[s] to make [her] keep loving" him. The song is in 3/4 time signature and the key of E major.

== Critical reception ==
Billy Dukes of Taste of Country gave the song two and a half stars out of five, writing that it "packs a surprising emotional punch, but it's weakened away by a grating melody." Bobby Peacock of Roughstock gave the song four stars out of five, calling it "a convincing, catchy slice of neo-trad that sounds as much 1992 as 2012."

== Music video ==
The music video was directed by Kristin Barlowe and premiered in February 2012.

== Chart performance ==
"Why Ya Wanna" debuted at number 60 on the U.S. Billboard Hot Country Songs chart for the week of December 10, 2011.

== Charts and certifications ==
=== Weekly charts ===
Chart (2012)	Peak position
Canada Country (Billboard)	24
Canada Hot 100 (Billboard)	100
US Billboard Hot 100	50
US Country Airplay (Billboard)	3
US Hot Country Songs (Billboard)	3

=== Certifications ===
Region	Certification	Certified units/sales
United States (RIAA)	Platinum	1,000,000^{‡}
^{‡} Sales+streaming figures based on certification alone.

=== Year-end charts ===
Chart (2012)	Position
US Country Songs (Billboard)	3
