= I Got the Boy =

Single by Jana Kramer

from the album Thirty One
- Released: March 30, 2015
- Recorded: 2015
- Genre: Country
- Length: 3:21
- Label: Warner Music Nashville
- Songwriter(s): Connie Harrington; Tim Nichols; Jamie Lynn Spears
- Producer(s): Scott Hendricks

Jana Kramer singles chronology
"Love" (2014)	"I Got the Boy" (2015)	"Said No One Ever" (2016)

"I Got the Boy" is a song recorded by American country music artist Jana Kramer. It was released to radio on March 30, 2015, as the second single from her second studio album, Thirty One, which was released on October 9, 2015. The song, written by Connie Harrington, Tim Nichols, and Jamie Lynn Spears, is about a woman reminiscing and discussing the differences about a former lover from her youth, in terms of appearance and character.

"I Got the Boy" peaked at numbers five and six on both the Billboard Hot Country Songs and Country Airplay charts respectively, giving Kramer her second top 10 hit on both charts. It also charted at number 56 on the Hot 100. The song was certified Platinum by the Recording Industry Association of America (RIAA), and has sold 592,000 copies in the United States as of April 2016. The song also charted in Canada, peaking at number 22 on the Country chart and number 85 on the Canadian Hot 100.

The accompanying music video for the song was directed by Kristin Barlowe.

== Content ==
In the song, the narrator sees a honeymoon newspaper story about a former lover from her youth. The narrator discusses the differences in appearance and character of the boy she knew, as opposed to the man who grew mature enough to marry. Kramer said she "started bawling" when producer Scott Hendricks played the demo for her, because it closely reflected her relationship with a high school sweetheart about whom she had been trying to write a song without success.

== Commercial performance ==
"I Got the Boy" was released for sale on February 10, 2015, debuting at number 18 on the Country Digital Songs chart and number 33 on the Billboard Hot Country Songs chart, selling 16,000 copies in its first week. Two weeks later, it debuted on the Country Airplay chart at number 54. On the Billboard Hot 100, the song debuted at number 92 the week of October 31. Thirteen weeks later, it peaked at number 56 the week of January 30, 2016, staying on the chart for sixteen weeks. The song has sold 592,000 copies in the US as of April 2016.

In Canada, the track debuted at number 99 on the Canadian Hot 100 the week of January 16, 2016. It peaked at number 85 the week of February 6, and remained on the chart for five weeks.

== Music video ==
The music video was directed by Kristin Barlowe and premiered in April 2015.

== Charts and certifications ==
=== Weekly charts ===
Chart (2015–2016)	Peak position
Canada (Canadian Hot 100)	85
Canada Country (Billboard)	22
US Billboard Hot 100	56
US Country Airplay (Billboard)	6
US Hot Country Songs (Billboard)	5

=== Year-end charts ===
Chart (2015)	Position
US Country Airplay (Billboard)	69
US Hot Country Songs (Billboard)	47

Chart (2016)	Position
US Hot Country Songs (Billboard)	67

=== Certifications ===
Region	Certification	Certified units/sales
United States (RIAA)	Platinum	1,000,000^{‡}
^{‡} Sales+streaming figures based on certification alone.
