= Meanwhile Back at the Ranch =

2000 single by The Clark Family Experience

Single by The Clark Family Experience

from the album The Clark Family Experience
- Released: July 29, 2000
- Genre: Country
- Length: 2:59
- Label: Curb
- Songwriters: Wayne Kirkpatrick; Gordon Kennedy
- Producers: Byron Gallimore; Tim McGraw

The Clark Family Experience singles chronology
"Meanwhile Back at the Ranch" (2000)	"Standin' Still" (2001)

"Meanwhile Back at the Ranch" is a debut song recorded by American country music band The Clark Family Experience. It was released in July 2000 as the first single from their self-titled debut album. The song was written by Wayne Kirkpatrick and Gordon Kennedy.

== Critical reception ==
Deborah Evans Price of Billboard gave the song a favorable review, saying that it "teems with energy and family harmonies that seem more earthy and organic, which is in appealing contrast to other smoothly polished, sometimes saccharine sibling outings."

== Chart performance ==
Chart (2000)	Peak position
US Hot Country Songs (Billboard)	18
US Billboard Hot 100	80
