= You Are (Aaron Goodvin song) =

2018 single by Aaron Goodvin

Single by Aaron Goodvin

from the album V
- Released: September 14, 2018
- Genre: Country pop
- Length: 3:01
- Label: Warner Canada
- Songwriter(s): Aaron Goodvin; Brandon Hood
- Producer(s): Aaron Goodvin; Matt McClure

Aaron Goodvin singles chronology
"Miss Me Yet" (2018)	"You Are" (2018)	"Bars & Churches" (2019)

Music video
- "You Are" on YouTube

"You Are" is a song recorded, co-written, and co-produced by Canadian-American country artist Aaron Goodvin. The track was co-written with Brandon Hood, and co-produced by Matt McClure. It became Goodvin's first #1 Canada Country hit.

== Commercial performance ==
"You Are" was certified Gold by Music Canada on December 11, 2019, with over 40,000 sales. It reached a peak of #1 on the Billboard Canada Country chart dated February 16, 2019, marking Goodvin's first chart-topper. It also reached a peak of #96 on the Canadian Hot 100, Goodvin's second highest entry there.

== Music video ==
The official music video for "You Are" premiered on October 4, 2018, and was directed by Joel Stewart.

== Charts ==
Chart (2019)	Peak position
Canada (Canadian Hot 100)	96
Canada Country (Billboard)	1

== Certifications ==
Region	Certification	Certified units/sales
Canada (Music Canada)	Gold	40,000^{‡}
^{‡} Sales+streaming figures based on certification alone.
