= Jana Kramer =

American actress and country singer (born 1983)

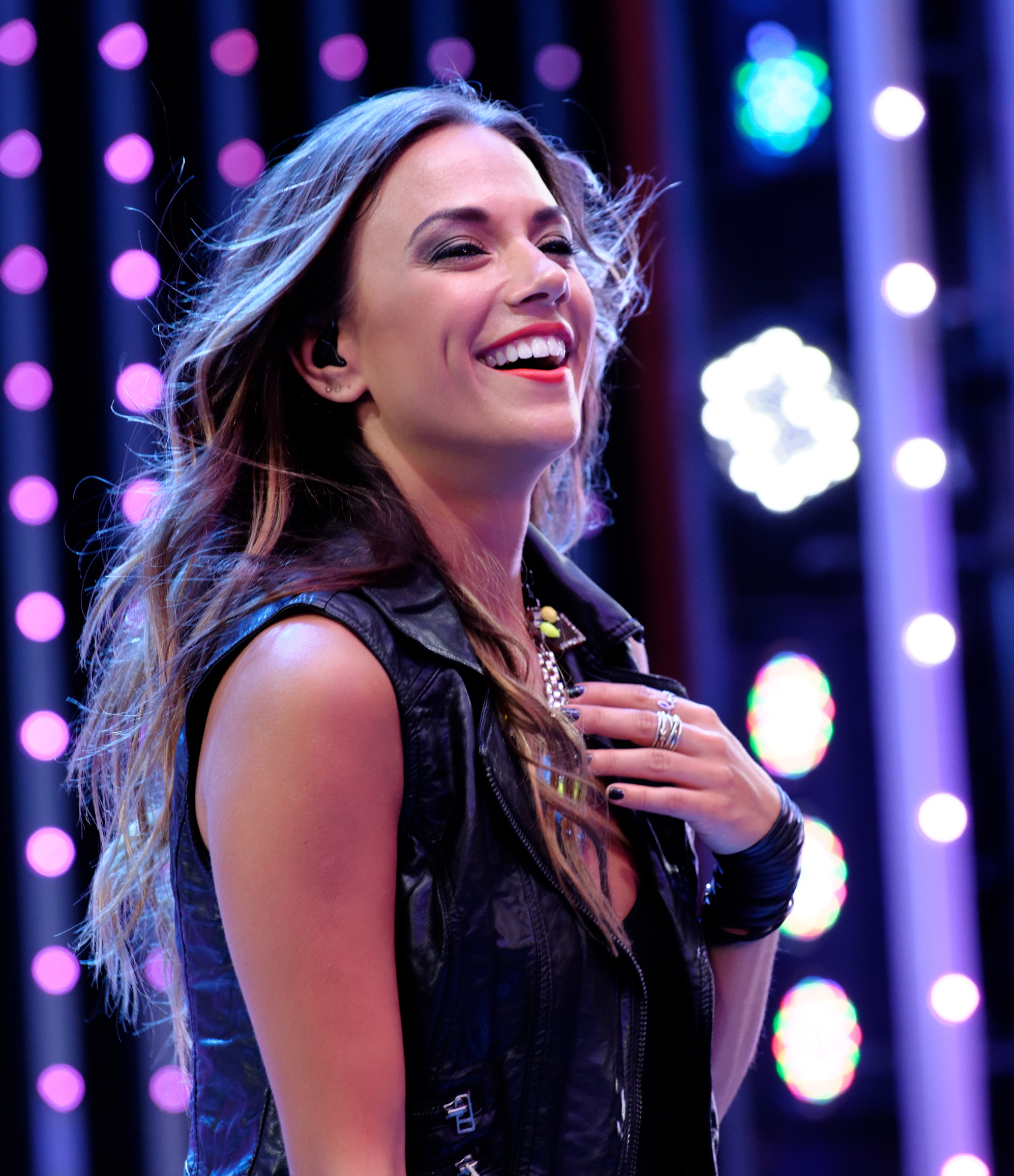
- Kramer in 2014
- Born: Jana Rae Kramer; December 2, 1983 (age 42); Rochester Hills, Michigan, U.S.
- Occupations: Actress; singer
- Years active: 2002–present
- Spouses: Michael Gambino (m. 2004; div. 2004); Johnathon Schaech (m. 2010; div. 2011); Mike Caussin (m. 2015; div. 2021); Allan Russell (m. 2024)
- Children: 3
- Website: www.janakramer.com

Jana Rae Kramer (born December 2, 1983) is an American actress and country singer. She rose to prominence by playing Alex Dupre in the CW's teen drama series One Tree Hill (2009–2012).

Kramer began her musical career in 2012 and has released two albums: Jana Kramer (2012) and Thirty One (2015). The albums produced seven charted singles on Hot Country Songs and Country Airplay, including the top 10 hits "Why Ya Wanna" and "I Got the Boy". She competed in season 23 of Dancing with the Stars, finishing in fourth place.

== Early life ==
Jana Rae Kramer was born on December 2, 1983, in Rochester Hills, Michigan, to Nora (née Kauffmann) and Martin Kramer. She has an elder brother, Steve, a sergeant at the Oakland County Sheriff's Office. Nora's paternal grandfather was of German descent through his father and maternal grandfather. Her paternal grandmother was also of German descent. Nora's maternal grandfather was of Slovak descent. Her maternal grandmother was of German and Irish descent. Kramer speaks some German. She lived in Dearborn for some time after her parents divorced. Kramer attended Rochester Adams High School, graduating in 2002. She subsequently moved to Los Angeles, California, to pursue an acting career. She later moved to Nashville, Tennessee.

== Career ==
=== 2002–2011: Acting career and record deal ===
In 2002, Kramer made her acting debut in the low-budget independent horror film Dead/Undead. The following year she guest appeared on All My Children, which marked her television debut. Kramer has since continued to appear in a number of television shows such as CSI: Crime Scene Investigation, Grey's Anatomy, Private Practice and CSI: NY. She has also had small supporting roles in films such as Return of the Living Dead: Necropolis, Click, Prom Night, Heart of the Country, and Country Crush. She was also in Spring Breakdown.

In 2007, Kramer appeared in a recurring role on the NBC sports drama television series Friday Night Lights. She played the role of Noelle Davenport in the series' second season. In 2008, Kramer appeared in The CW teen drama series 90210, a reboot of the 1990s teen drama television series Beverly Hills 90210. She played the role of high school student Portia Ranson and made her debut in the first season's second episode "The Jet Set". Her role went on for six episodes and Kramer made her final appearance in "The Party's Over", which aired May 5, 2009. In 2009, Kramer appeared on the HBO dramedy television series Entourage. She played the role of a sorority girl who seduces the character Turtle (Jerry Ferrara), and appeared in four episodes.

In June 2009, it was announced Kramer would star in the seventh season of CW drama television series One Tree Hill. She played the role of Alex Dupre, an actress and tabloid darling who becomes the new face of Brooke Davis's fashion line, "Clothes Over Bros", and creates havoc for the residents of Tree Hill. Kramer made her debut in the season's first episode. Initially her appearance on the show was meant to be in a recurring form, but her role was upgraded to a series regular by the season's fourteenth episode, "Family Affair". In March 2012, Kramer made the announcement that she would no longer be making regular appearances in the show's ninth and final season, as she decided to focus on her music career. Her last appearance on the show occurred in the second episode of the ninth season, "In the Room Where You Sleep," which was aired on January 18, 2012.

In February 2011, Kramer signed a recording contract with Elektra Records. That same month she premiered her promo track, "I Won't Give Up", which premiered in the One Tree Hill episode, "Holding Out for a Hero", and was released the following day exclusively on iTunes and Amazon. The song reached number 75 on the US Billboard Hot 100 chart. The following month Kramer began work on her debut album. Country music producer Scott Hendricks produced the majority of the record. In April 2011, Kramer released another promo track, titled "Whiskey", which she also performed on One Tree Hill. The song reached number 99 on the Billboard Hot 100 chart on digital sales alone.

=== 2012–present: Jana Kramer, and Dancing with the Stars ===
In February 2012, Kramer was cast as the protagonist in the independent drama film, Heart of the Country, playing the role of a privileged young woman, Faith Carraday, who is following her show-biz dreams but leaves it all and moves to rural North Carolina after her husband is jailed for Wall Street fraud. Kramer is also attached to a horror film named The Gatekeeper.

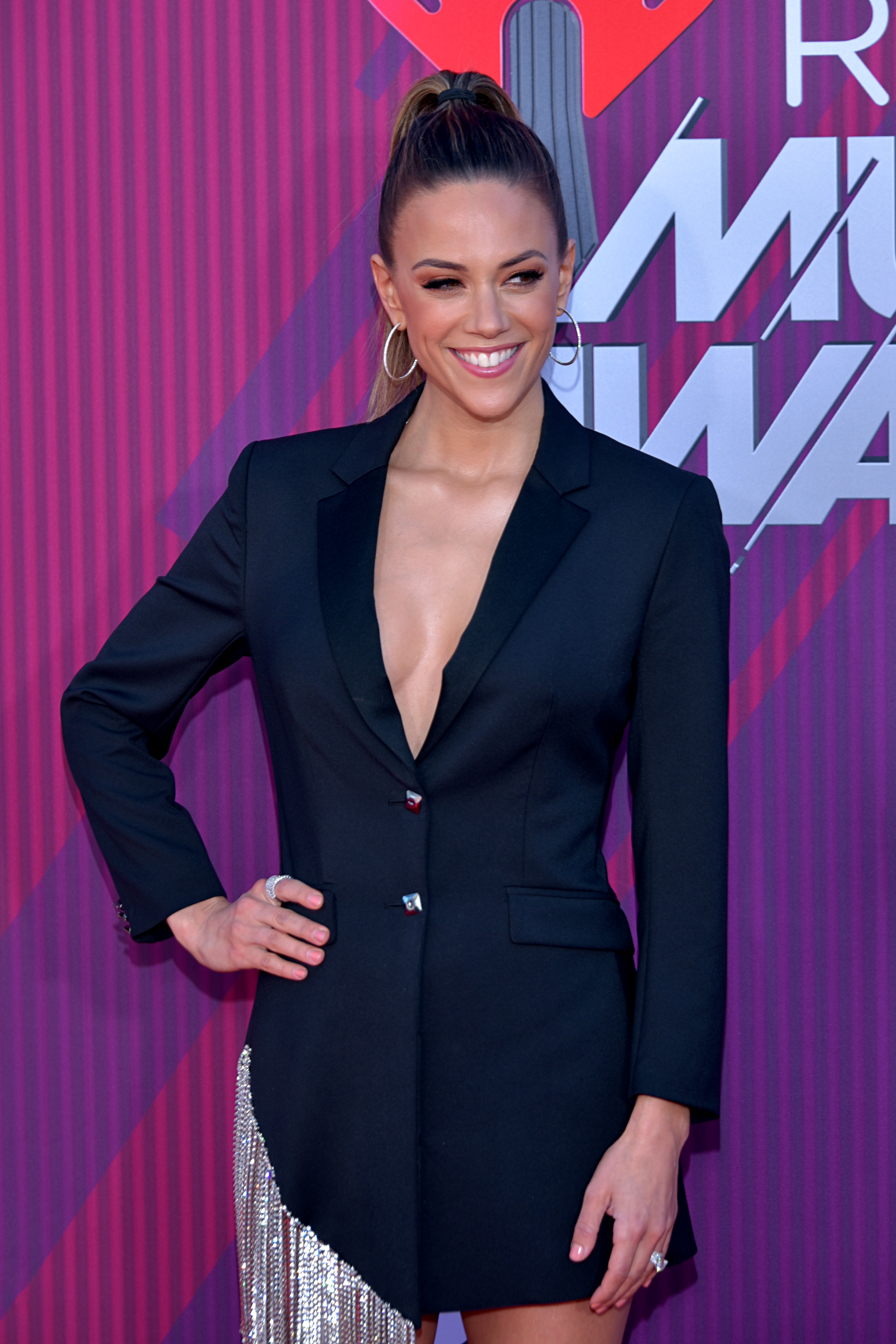
Jana Kramer at the 2019 iHeartRadio Music Awards in Los Angeles.

On January 16, 2012, Kramer released her official debut single, "Why Ya Wanna". She premiered the official music video, directed by Kristin Barlowe, on February 6, 2012. The song peaked at number 52 on the US Billboard Hot 100 chart and number 3 on the Billboard Hot Country Songs chart. "Whiskey" is the album's second official single. On June 1, 2012, Kramer made her first televised live performance on Fox & Friends to promote her debut album. She performed "Why Ya Wanna" in front of a crowd of fans in New York City. On June 5, 2012, she released her self-titled debut album Jana Kramer. The record received positive reviews from critics with many praising Kramer's vocal performance.

On June 5, 2013, Nationwide Insurance released the first of a series of commercials in its "Join the Nation" campaign, featuring Kramer as a stealthy woman dressed in black leather who follows a team of burglars and replaces the items they steal with newer versions to promote Nationwide's "Brand New Belongings" initiative. Nationwide had signed Kramer to sing the Nationwide jingle in August 2012. A second commercial, released in April 2014, featured Kramer's character replacing items in a fire-blackened apartment to promote Nationwide's renters' insurance. In November 2014, Jana reprised her Nationwide role, this time as a sexy Santa Claus-like figure replacing items during Christmas season. Nationwide's advertising partner McKinney is behind the spots.

In July 2013, Kramer opened for Blake Shelton on his Ten Times Crazier Tour in Virginia Beach, VA. In August 2013, the independent film Approaching Midnight starring Kramer had its world premiere at the Emagine Royal Oak in Michigan.

In 2024, Jana Kramer starred in the Lifetime movie Gaslit By My Husband: The Morgan Metzer Story as Morgan Metzer where she was also the executive producer. It is based on the true story on how Morgan was gaslit by her ex-husband Rodney Metzer (portrayed by Austin Nichols). Also in 2024, Kramer competed in season twelve of The Masked Singer as "Royal Knight" and had Savannah Chrisley (who competed in season eleven as "Afghan Hound") serving as her Mask Ambassador. She was eliminated in the "Group C Finals: Peanuts Thanksgiving" alongside Bronson Arroyo as "Sherlock Hound".

== Personal life ==
On April 14, 2004, Kramer married her first husband, Michael Gambino, who was 17 years her senior, in Las Vegas after two weeks of dating. They divorced several months later after Gambino subjected Kramer to severe domestic abuse, which escalated from emotional manipulation to physical violence. On August 6, 2005, Gambino choked Kramer into unconsciousness and, believing that he had killed her, left her bleeding outside their home in Los Angeles. In 2005, Gambino was convicted of premeditated attempted murder and was sentenced to six years in prison. In 2010, Gambino was released from prison after serving five years and died by suicide two years later.

On December 22, 2009, Kramer became engaged to actor Johnathon Schaech, whom she had met on the set of Prom Night (2008). They married in Glen Arbor, Michigan on July 4, 2010, but separated a month later. Their divorce was finalized in June 2011, with both waiving their rights to spousal support. Kramer began dating country music singer Brantley Gilbert, whom she met at the CMT Music Awards in June 2012, and became engaged on his 28th birthday in January 2013. They ended their relationship in August 2013 due to their busy schedules, but remained on good terms. In November 2013, Kramer briefly dated actor Scott Eastwood.

In August 2014, Kramer began dating Washington Redskins tight end Mike Caussin, whom she met on Twitter. She announced just weeks later that they had split because of his infidelity. Shortly after, she publicly forgave him and they reconciled. Kramer and Caussin became engaged on her 31st birthday in December 2014, and were married in Charlottesville, Virginia on May 22, 2015. On August 10, 2015, the couple revealed they were expecting their first child. Kramer gave birth to her daughter, Jolie Rae Caussin, on January 31, 2016. By August 2016, Kramer and Caussin had separated in the midst of Caussin's admission into rehab for sex addiction. They reconciled the following year and renewed their wedding vows in December 2017.

In April 2018, Kramer and Caussin shared their battle with his sex addiction. In July 2018, Kramer announced she was expecting her second child. Kramer gave birth to her son, Jace Joseph Caussin, on November 29, 2018. On April 20, 2021, Kramer filed for divorce from Caussin, citing "inappropriate marital conduct, irreconcilable differences and adultery". Two days after the pair split, a temporary restraining order was issued. On May 20, 2021, it was reported that Kramer and Caussin reached an agreement with custody and child support. Kramer was awarded primary custody, according to the documents. The divorce was finalized on July 22, 2021.

Between September 2021 and October 2021, Kramer dated Chicago Bears quarterback Jay Cutler following his divorce from Kristin Cavallari. Kramer had been close friends with Cavallari, but after Cutler went public with the relationship, Cavallari blocked Kramer on social media and the two have remained estranged. In late 2021, Kramer began dating fitness trainer and United States Navy veteran Ian Schinelli. Schinelli has a daughter from a previous relationship. They ended their relationship in April 2022, with Kramer claiming that it was due to Schinelli's infidelity and she had become friends with his ex-wife, while Schinelli cited Kramer's alleged jealousy and possessiveness as the reason. Schinelli also claimed that he cut off family and friends during the six months that he and Kramer were dating.

In January 2023, Kramer publicly confirmed via Instagram her relationship with Scottish football player Allan Russell. On May 25, 2023, it was confirmed the two were engaged after six months of dating. On June 8, 2023, the couple confirmed via Instagram that they were expecting their first child together. Kramer gave birth to her son, Roman James Russell, on November 13, 2023. They married at Carnell Estate in South Ayrshire, Scotland on July 13, 2024. Through her marriage to Russell, Kramer became stepmother to his son, Troy, from a previous relationship.

== Filmography ==
=== Film ===
Year	Title	Role	Notes
2002	Dead/Undead	Alice St. James	
2003	The Passage	Bartender at Alvin's	
2003	Blood Games	Mistress Tiamat	Credited as Jana Rae
2005	Blue Demon	Carrie	
2005	Return of the Living Dead: Necropolis	Katie Williams	
2006	Click	Julie	
2007	Boxboarders!	Victoria	
2008	Prom Night	April	
2008	Bar Starz	Ryann	
2008	The Poker Club	Trudy Todaro	
2009	Laid to Rest	Jamie	
2009	Spring Breakdown	Seven #2	
2013	Heart of the Country	Faith Carraday	
2013	Approaching Midnight	Aspen	
2016	Country Crush	Katherine	
2018	Support the Girls	Shaina	

=== Television ===
Year	Title	Role	Notes
2006	CSI: NY	Paige Rowand	Episode 3.10: "Sweet 16"
2007–2008	Friday Night Lights	Noelle Davenport	7 episodes
2008	Can You Duet	Herself	Episode 1.01 "Open Auditions"; Episode: "Workshop Week 1"
2008	Grey's Anatomy	Lola	Episode: "Freedom" (Parts 1 & 2)
2008–09	90210	Portia Ranson	5 episodes
2009	Private Practice	Lyla	Episode 2.19: "What Women Want"
2009	Entourage	Brooke Manning	3 episodes
2009–12	One Tree Hill	Alex Dupre	Main role in seasons 7–9 (43 episodes)
2013	Dance Moms	Herself	Episode 4.01: "Welcome Back... Now Don't Get Too Comfy"
2016	Dancing with the Stars	Herself	Contestant on season 23
2016	Country Crush	Katherine	Television film
2017	Love at First Bark	Julia	Television film (Hallmark)
2017	Christmas in Mississippi	Holly Logan	Television film (Lifetime)
2019	Christmas in Louisiana	Sarah Winter	Television film (Lifetime)
2020	A Welcome Home Christmas	Chloe Marquee	Television film (Lifetime)
2021	Soccer Mom Madam	Anna	Television film (Lifetime)
2021	The Holiday Fix Up	Sam	Television film (Lifetime); Also executive producer
2022	Steppin' Into The Holiday	Rae	Television film (Lifetime); Also executive producer
2022	72 hours	Anita	Television film (Lifetime)
2023	Chicago Fire	Melissa Keating	Season 11 Episode 11: "A Guy I Used to Know "
2023	A Cowboy Christmas Romance	Lexie Crenshaw	Television film (Lifetime)
2024	Gaslit By My Husband: The Morgan Metzer Story	Morgan Metzer	Television film (Lifetime); Also executive producer
2024	The Masked Singer	Herself/Royal Knight	Season 12 Contestant

== Dancing with the Stars ==
On August 30, 2016, Kramer was announced as one of the celebrities who would compete on season 23 of Dancing with the Stars. She was partnered with professional partner Gleb Savchenko. Kramer and Savchenko reached the finals of the show and finished in 4th place.

Week	Dance	Music	Judges' scores (Note: Individual judges' scores are listed in the following order: Carrie Ann Inaba, Len Goodman, Julianne Hough, Bruno Tonioli.)				Total score	Result
1	Viennese waltz	"Dangerous Woman" — Ariana Grande	7	6	6	8	27	Safe
2	Tango	"I Don't Want to Be" — Gavin DeGraw	7	8	7	7	29	Safe
3	Jive	"Too Many Fish in the Sea" — Bette Midler	6	7	6	7	26	Safe (Immunity)
4	Foxtrot	"Here Comes the Sun" — The Beatles	8	—N/a	7	8	23	Safe
5	Contemporary	"In My Daughter's Eyes" — Martina McBride	9	—N/a	8	9	26	Safe
6	Argentine tango	"Hands to Myself" — Selena Gomez	10	—N/a	10	10	40 (Note: Jana and Gleb also received a score of 10 from guest judge Pitbull.)	Safe
7	Samba	"Get Down Tonight" — KC and the Sunshine Band	8	8	9	9	34	Safe
7	Freestyle (Team Future)	"Embrace" — Armin van Buuren, feat. Eric Vloeimans	8	9	9	9	35	Safe
8	Jazz	"Little Shop of Horrors" — Alan Menken	9	—N/a	9	9	27	Safe
8	Salsa (Dance-off)	"Magic" — Robin Thicke	Winner				3	Safe
9	Waltz	"She Used to Be Mine" — Sara Bareilles	10	—N/a	10	10	40 (Note: Jana and Gleb also received a score of 10 from guest judge Idina Menzel.)	Safe
9	Contemporary (Team dance)	"Bird Set Free" — Sia	10	—N/a	10	10	40	Safe
10 Semifinals	Quickstep	"Go Mama" — Wayne Beckford	9	—N/a	9	10	28	Safe
10 Semifinals	Paso doble	"Kill of the Night" — Gin Wigmore	10	—N/a	10	10	30	Safe
11 (Finals)	Tango	"Stay the Night" — Zedd, feat. Hayley Williams	8	9	9	9	35	Eliminated
11 (Finals)	Freestyle	"Unstoppable" — Sia	9	9	9	9	36	Eliminated

== Discography ==
- Jana Kramer (2012)
- Thirty One (2015)

== Awards and nominations ==
Year	Association	Category	Result
2012	American Country Awards	New Artist of the Year	Nominated
2012	American Country Awards	Single by a New Artist: "Why You Wanna"	Nominated
2012	American Country Awards	Music Video by a New Artist: "Why You Wanna"	Nominated
2013	ACM Awards	Top New Female Artist	Won
2013	ACM Awards	Top New Artist	Nominated
2013	CMT Music Awards	Female Video of the Year: "Why Ya Wanna"	Nominated
2013	CMT Music Awards	Breakthrough Video of the Year: "Why Ya Wanna"	Nominated
2016	ACM Awards	Female Vocalist of the Year	Nominated
2016	American Country Countdown Awards	Breakthrough Female of the Year	Nominated
2016	American Country Countdown Awards	Female Vocalist of the Year	Nominated
