= 2022 in country music =

This is a list of notable events in country music that took place in 2022.

== Events ==
- January 18 – Tyler Hubbard and Brian Kelley of Florida Georgia Line announce they are "taking a break" from recording music together and will be in an indefinite hiatus from touring after several 2022 shows while they pursue solo careers.
- February 19 – Brad Paisley scores his 20th number one on the Billboard Country Airplay chart as featured on Jimmie Allen's "Freedom Was a Highway", tying him with Brooks & Dunn and Toby Keith for the tenth most number ones on that chart since its inception in January 1990.
- March 29 – Eric Church made headlines after cancelling a show at the AT&T Center in order to attend a college basketball game in North Carolina. Church released a statement announcing his intention to watch the Tar Heels vs Blue Devils, longtime rivals who have never faced off in the Final Four of the NCAA tournament, with his family, expressing that it is the most "selfish" thing he has ever done. The decision drew intense criticism from fans who had paid to attend the concert.
- April 7 – Stevie Woodward takes over as lead singer of Runaway June, replacing Naomi Cooke who left two months prior.
- April 10 – Tanya Tucker celebrates the 50th anniversary of her first single, "Delta Dawn", with an all-star concert at the Ryman Auditorium. Guests included Brenda Lee, T. Graham Brown, Delbert McClinton, Paul Overstreet, Jessi Colter, LeAnn Rimes, Ty Herndon and Brandi Carlile.
- April 11 –
  - "Drunk (And I Don't Wanna Go Home)" by Elle King and Miranda Lambert reaches number one on the Country Airplay chart, becoming the first female duet to reach the top spot in almost thirty years, following "Does He Love You" by Reba McEntire and Linda Davis in November 1993.
  - To celebrate their pending induction into the Country Music Hall of Fame, Naomi and Wynonna Judd reunited to perform "Love Can Build a Bridge" at the 2022 CMT Music Awards. Their appearance marked the first time the duo had performed together as The Judds on a televised awards show in more than twenty years. The performance was the duo's last before the death of Naomi on April 30.
- April 30 – Garth Brooks performed a concert to more than 102,000 fans at Louisiana State University's Tiger Stadium; movement in the venue registered as a small earthquake when he sang "Callin' Baton Rouge", the unofficial anthem of LSU.
- May 19 – Wynonna Judd announces an all-star female lineup of artists to accompany her on The Judds' final tour, in the fall. Brandi Carlile, Faith Hill, Martina McBride, Trisha Yearwood, Little Big Town and Ashley McBryde will fill in for Naomi on select dates, with more artists to be announced at later dates.
- May 20 – John Driskell Hopkins of the Zac Brown Band publicly announces his diagnosis of amyotrophic lateral sclerosis, also known as ALS or Lou Gehrig's disease.
- May 26 – In the aftermath of the Robb Elementary School shooting in Uvalde, Texas, multiple entertainers – including country performers Larry Gatlin, Lee Greenwood and Larry Stewart, along with "American Pie" singer Don McLean – announce they would not be performing at the National Rifle Association of America's annual convention, which was scheduled the weekend of May 28.
- June 1- Stu Phillips celebrates his 55th Grand Ole Opry anniversary
- June 9–12 – After a two-year absence due to the COVID-19 pandemic, the CMA Music Festival returns to Nashville.
- June 12 – Toby Keith announces he had been diagnosed with stomach cancer at the end of the prior year, having undergone chemotherapy, radiation, and surgery for the past six months. Keith would eventually die of the disease on February 5, 2024.
- July 19 – Chapel Hart, a country music group from Mississippi, competes on the television series America's Got Talent and received the Golden Buzzer.
- July 29- Barbara Mandrell celebrates her 50th Grand Ole Opry Anniversary
- August 2 – After a decade of touring together, Joanna Cotten announced that she had left Eric Church's band in order to pursue a solo career.
- August 4 – Lady A announce that they are postponing their Request Line Tour to allow member Charles Kelley to focus on his sobriety.
- August 12 – Singer-songwriter Gretchen Peters revealed her decision to retire from touring and will play her final shows in June 2023, though she will continue to write and record music.
- August 29 –
  - Kelsea Ballerini announces that she has filed for divorce from Morgan Evans after nearly five years of marriage.
  - Jason Aldean's wife, Brittany, makes an Instagram post which leads to singers such as Maren Morris and Cassadee Pope accusing her of transphobia. In response, Aldean's public relations firm The GreenRoom drops him as a client on September 1.
- September 9 – John Michael Montgomery's tour bus overturns in an accident outside Jellico, Tennessee, injuring Montgomery and several passengers.
- September 11 – Monarch, a country music drama series starring Susan Sarandon, Trace Adkins and Anna Friel, debuts on Fox.
- September 25- Loretta Lynn celebrates her 60th Grand Ole Opry anniversary
- October 4 – Kentucky Rising, a benefit concert organized by Chris and Morgane Stapleton is held at the Rupp Arena to raise money following devastating flooding that occurred in the state. Other performers included Dwight Yoakam and Tyler Childers alongside surprise appearances from Ricky Skaggs and Patty Loveless, marking a rare live performance following her retirement from live shows in 2009.
- October 11 – Blake Shelton announces he is leaving The Voice after its 23rd season in 2023.
- October 13 – The Mastersons announce that they are leaving Steve Earle's band The Dukes after twelve years.
- October 27 – Dolly Parton announces her retirement from touring.
- October 29 –
  - Sam Williams, the grandson of Hank Williams and son of Hank Williams Jr. comes out as gay using the music video of his single "Titled Crown".
  - Darius Rucker's version of the Old Crow Medicine Show song "Wagon Wheel" is certified diamond, becoming only the fourth country song (behind "Cruise", "Tennessee Whiskey" and "Old Town Road") to reach this milestone.
- November 3 – Caroline Jones becomes an official member of the Zac Brown Band after serving as their opening act since 2017. Jones is the group's first female member.
- December 30 – "You Proof" by Morgan Wallen spends a tenth week at number one on the Country Airplay chart, thus making it the longest-running number-one single in that chart's history.

=== Grand Ole Opry ===
- January 8 – Morgan Wallen's performance with Ernest on the Grand Ole Opry leads to criticism from fans and other country music artists, following the controversy that surrounded Wallen after he was filmed using a racial slur eleven months prior as well as an anti-racism tweet made by the institution.
- February 12 – Lauren Alaina is inducted by Trisha Yearwood as the Opry's first member of 2022 following an invite by Yearwood in December 2021. At twenty-seven, Alaina becomes the youngest member of the Opry.
- March 19 – After making frequent guest appearances for over seventeen years, Jamey Johnson was invited by Bill Anderson to become an Opry member, with his induction set for May 14.
- June 11 – Vince Gill invites Hall of Famers Charlie McCoy and Don Schlitz to become Opry members, the first time in decades that two artists received the invitation during the same show. McCoy was subsequently inducted by Larry Gatlin on July 13 and Schlitz was inducted by Gill and Randy Travis on August 30.
- September 17 – Jeannie Seely celebrates her 55th anniversary as an Opry member. Seely has performed on the show over 5000 times, extending her record as the most frequently appearing artist.
- October 6 – Garth Brooks surprises Ashley McBryde with an invitation to become the newest Grand Ole Opry member during an interview on CBS Mornings, live from the circle. She was inducted on December 10 by Opry star Terri Clark.

== Top hits of the year ==
The following songs placed within the Top 20 on the Hot Country Songs, Country Airplay, or Canada Country charts in 2022:

=== Singles released by American and Australian artists ===
Songs	Airplay	Canada	Single	Artist	References
5	1	1	"5 Foot 9"	Tyler Hubbard	
10	1	1	"23"	Sam Hunt	
15	4	6	"7500 OBO"	Tim McGraw	
3	5	1	"AA"	Walker Hayes	
16	1	10	"At the End of a Bar"	Chris Young with Mitchell Tenpenny	
5	1	2	"Beers on Me"	Dierks Bentley featuring Breland and Hardy	
17	2	3	"Best Thing Since Backroads"	Jake Owen	
1	1	1	"Buy Dirt"	Jordan Davis featuring Luke Bryan	
9	9	7	"Circles Around This Town"	Maren Morris	
18	12	3	"Come Back as a Country Boy"	Blake Shelton	
15	3	10	"Country On"	Luke Bryan	
46	17	—	"Country'd Look Good on You"	Frank Ray	
6	1	2	"Damn Strait"	Scotty McCreery	
7	—	—	"Days That End in Why"	Morgan Wallen	
2	1	2	"Doin' This"	Luke Combs	
11	3	3	"Don't Come Lookin'"	Jackson Dean	
1	46	—	"Don't Think Jesus"	Morgan Wallen	
6	1	28	"Drunk (And I Don't Wanna Go Home)"	Elle King & Miranda Lambert	
39	17	41	"Everyone She Knows"	Kenny Chesney	
5	1	1	"Fall in Love"	Bailey Zimmerman	
13	18	16	"Flower Shops"	Ernest featuring Morgan Wallen	
5	1	21	"Freedom Was a Highway"	Jimmie Allen & Brad Paisley	
12	6	9	"Ghost Story"	Carrie Underwood	
16	11	8	"Give Heaven Some Hell"	Hardy	
9	1	1	"Half of Me"	Thomas Rhett featuring Riley Green	
11	1	13	"Half of My Hometown"	Kelsea Ballerini featuring Kenny Chesney	
12	5	5	"Heart on Fire"	Eric Church	
21	11	22	"Home Sweet"	Russell Dickerson	
3	23	34	"I Bet You Think About Me"	Taylor Swift featuring Chris Stapleton	
8	12	3	"If I Was a Cowboy"	Miranda Lambert	
1	2	1	"The Kind of Love We Make"	Luke Combs	
5	1	1	"Last Night Lonely"	Jon Pardi	
3	1	1	"Like I Love Country Music"	Kane Brown	
2	1	1	"Never Say Never"	Cole Swindell and Lainey Wilson	
13	1	1	"Never Wanted to Be That Girl"	Carly Pearce and Ashley McBryde	
13	1	9	"New Truck"	Dylan Scott	
24	14	4	"No Hard Feelings"	Old Dominion	
4	1	1	"One Mississippi"	Kane Brown	
23	12	31	"Out in the Middle"	Zac Brown Band	
30	17	48	"Party Mode"	Dustin Lynch	
6	—	—	"Pick Out a Christmas Tree"	Dan + Shay	
14	—	—	"Progress"	John Rich	
2	1	1	"Sand in My Boots"	Morgan Wallen	
3	1	1	"She Had Me at Heads Carolina"	Cole Swindell	
13	16	38	"She Likes It"	Russell Dickerson with Jake Scott	
9	2	4	"Slow Down Summer"	Thomas Rhett	
20	19	2	"Soul"	Lee Brice	
2	1	4	"Take My Name"	Parmalee	
5	—	—	"Tennessee Fan"	Morgan Wallen	
14	5	3	"Tequila Little Time"	Jon Pardi	
1	1	1	"'Til You Can't"	Cody Johnson	
6	1	33	"To Be Loved by You"	Parker McCollum	
13	—	—	"Tomorrow Me"	Luke Combs	
4	1	2	"Trouble with a Heartbreak"	Jason Aldean	
11	2	23	"Truth About You"	Mitchell Tenpenny	
33	21	16	"Up"	Luke Bryan	
1	1	1	"Wasted on You"	Morgan Wallen	
6	1	—	"Whiskey and Rain"	Michael Ray	
19	4	1	"Wild Hearts"	Keith Urban	
11	4	5	"Wishful Drinking"	Ingrid Andress with Sam Hunt	
12	1	3	"With a Woman You Love"	Justin Moore	
1	1	1	"You Proof"	Morgan Wallen	
1	1	1	"You Should Probably Leave"	Chris Stapleton	

=== Singles released by Canadian artists ===
Songs	Airplay	Canada	Single	Artist	References
—	—	1	"11 Beers"	The Reklaws with Jake Owen	
—	—	15	"Ain't Like Me"	Nate Haller	
—	34	12	"Back Then, Right Now"	Tenille Arts	
—	—	5	"Broken Umbrella"	Jojo Mason	
—	—	10	"Cool About It"	Meghan Patrick	
—	—	6	"Country Music, Girls and Trucks"	High Valley featuring Granger Smith	
—	—	10	"Dodge Out of Hell"	Tim Hicks	
—	—	9	"Drink Along Song"	Gord Bamford	
—	—	5	"First Taste of Gone"	Josh Ross	
—	—	9	"Float"	Tim and the Glory Boys	
—	—	1	"Hide from a Broken Heart"	Dallas Smith	
—	—	5	"I'd Go to Jail"	Dean Brody	
—	—	6	"Knock Off"	Jess Moskaluke	
—	—	5	"Let Me Down Easy"	Jojo Mason	
—	—	14	"Lucky Stars"	Aaron Goodvin	
—	—	1	"New Old Trucks"	James Barker Band featuring Dierks Bentley	
—	—	15	"Night in the Life"	Brett Kissel	
—	—	6	"One Too"	Dallas Smith with MacKenzie Porter	
—	—	1	"Pickup"	MacKenzie Porter	
—	—	6	"Relationship Goals"	Steven Lee Olsen	
—	—	8	"Right on Time"	Lindsay Ell	
—	—	2	"Shakin' in Them Boots"	Jade Eagleson	
—	—	1	"She Don't Know"	Jade Eagleson	
—	—	5	"Tailgate to Heaven"	Shawn Austin featuring Chris Lane	
—	—	2	"Whatever It Takes"	High Valley	
—	—	2	"Wastin' Whiskey"	James Barker Band	
—	—	14	"What Was I Drinking"	Tebey	
—	—	7	"When's It Gonna Happen"	Tenille Townes	
—	—	1	"Where'd You Learn How to Do That"	Dean Brody	
—	—	10	"Whiskey Does"	Tim Hicks	
—	—	8	"Wild as Her"	Tyler Joe Miller	

== Top new album releases ==
US	Album	Artist	Record label	Release date	Reference
2	Country Stuff the Album	Walker Hayes	Monument	January 21	
5	Frayed at Both Ends	Aaron Lewis	Big Machine	January 28	
9	Blue in the Sky	Dustin Lynch	Broken Bow	February 11	
4	Run Rose Run	Dolly Parton	Butterfly	March 7	
2	Humble Quest	Maren Morris	Columbia Nashville	March 25	
9	My Chains Are Gone: Hymns & Gospel Favorites	Reba McEntire	MCA Nashville/Rockin' R	March 25	
2	Where We Started	Thomas Rhett	Valory	April 1	
6	Stereotype	Cole Swindell	Warner Nashville	April 8	
2	Georgia	Jason Aldean	Broken Bow/Macon	April 22	
2	Palomino	Miranda Lambert	RCA Nashville	April 29	
1	American Heartbreak	Zach Bryan	Warner	May 20	
2	Denim & Rhinestones	Carrie Underwood	Capitol Nashville	June 10	
1	Growin' Up	Luke Combs	Columbia Nashville	June 24	
7	Summertime Blues	Zach Bryan	Warner	July 15	
10	Tornillo	Whiskey Myers	Thirty Tigers	July 29	
5	Mr. Saturday Night	Jon Pardi	Capitol Nashville	September 2	
2	Different Man	Kane Brown	RCA/Zone 4	September 9	
3	Hell Paso	Koe Wetzel	YellaBush/Columbia	September 16	
10	Mr. Sun	Little Big Town	Capitol Nashville	September 16	
3	Subject to Change	Kelsea Ballerini	Black River	September 23	
2	Leave the Light On	Bailey Zimmerman	Elektra/Warner Music Nashville/3EE	October 14	
9	Bell Bottom Country	Lainey Wilson	BBR Music Group	October 28	
4	Diamonds & Rhinestones: The Greatest Hits Collection	Dolly Parton	RCA Nashville/Legacy	November 18	

=== Other top albums ===
US	Album	Artist	Record label	Release date	Reference
31	Born for This	Chase Matthew	Holler Boy	February 11	
39	Welcome to the Block Party	Priscilla Block	Mercury Nashville	February 11	
12	Flower Shops (The Album)	Ernest	Big Loud	March 11	
11	Bronco	Orville Peck	Columbia/Sub Pop	April 8	
13	A Beautiful Time	Willie Nelson	Legacy	April 29	
37	The Last Resort: Greetings From	Midland	Big Machine	May 6	
27	12th of June	Lyle Lovett	Verve	May 13	
22	Rich White Honky Blues	Hank Williams Jr.	Easy Eye Sound/Concord	June 17	
16	Songs About You	Brett Eldredge	Warner Music Nashville	June 17	
49	100 Proof Neon	Ronnie Dunn	Little Will-E	July 29	
12	Livin' My Best Life	Dylan Scott	Curb	August 5	
47	Something Borrowed, Something New: A Tribute to John Anderson	Various artists	Easy Eye Sound/Concord	August 5	
18	Good Person	Ingrid Andress	Warner Nashville	August 26	
15	Cross Country	Breland	Bad Realm/Atlantic	September 9	
14	This Is the Heavy	Mitchell Tenpenny	Riser House/Columbia Nashville	September 16	
18	Russell Dickerson	Russell Dickerson	Triple Tigers	November 4	

== Deaths ==
- January 9 – Jerry Ray Johnston, 65, drummer for Bandana (COVID-19)
- January 11 – Jerry Crutchfield, 87, American record producer (Anne Murray, Lee Greenwood, Tanya Tucker)
- January 14 – Dallas Frazier, 82, American singer-songwriter ("Elvira", "Beneath Still Waters" and "There Goes My Everything")
- January 15 – Ralph Emery, 88, American disc jockey and television host (Pop! Goes the Country, Nashville Now)
- January 30 – Hargus "Pig" Robbins, 84, session pianist
- February 17 – Dallas Good, 48, member of Canadian band The Sadies.
- February 18 – Scotty Wray, former member of The Wrays, brother of Collin Raye, and guitarist for Miranda Lambert.
- March 1 – Warner Mack, 86, American country singer-songwriter ("Is It Wrong (For Loving You)", "The Bridge Washed Out").
- March 4 – Jimbeau Hinson, 70, American songwriter (stroke)
- March 10 – Bobbie Nelson, 91, American pianist and singer; sister of Willie Nelson.
- March 11 – Brad Martin, 48, American country singer-songwriter ("Before I Knew Better").
- March 12 – Bruce Burch, 69, songwriter ("It's Your Call", "Rumor Has It")
- March 24 – Randy Cornor, 67, singer-songwriter ("Sometimes I Talk in My Sleep")
- March 26 – Jeff Carson, 58, singer-songwriter ("Not on Your Love", "The Car") (heart attack)
- April 1 – C. W. McCall, 93, singer ("Convoy") (cancer)
- April 1 – Roland White, 83, American bluegrass musician and mandolinist (complications of a heart attack)
- April 25 – Shane Yellowbird, 42, Canadian country singer
- April 30 – Naomi Judd, 76, one-half of The Judds and mother of Wynonna Judd (suicide)
- May 7 – Mickey Gilley, 86, American country singer-songwriter ("Stand By Me", "Room Full of Roses", "Lonely Nights")
- May 23 – Thom Bresh, 74, American singer and guitarist ("Homemade Love") (esophageal cancer)
- May 29 – Ronnie Hawkins, 87, American-Canadian rockabilly singer.
- June 1 – Deborah McCrary, 67, member of Americana/gospel quartet The McCrary Sisters
- June 2 – Hal Bynum, 87, American songwriter ("Lucille"), complications from a stroke and Alzheimer's disease.
- June 10 – Baxter Black, 77, American cowboy poet and veterinarian.
- June 14 – Joel Whitburn, 82, chart historian whose Record Research helped produce books on how songs placed on the Billboard magazine charts, including the Hot Country Songs chart.
- June 23 – Bobby Flores, 61, singer, fiddler and record producer (esophageal cancer).
- July 27 – John Grenell, 78, New Zealand country singer.
- August 8 – Olivia Newton-John, 73, British-Australian country pop singer-songwriter and actress and the only non-American artist to win the CMA Award for Female Vocalist of the Year. (cancer)
- August 26 – Luke Bell, 32, American country musician and singer-songwriter.
- September 9 – Herschel Sizemore, 87, American bluegrass mandolinist.
- September 21 – Ray Edenton, 95, American guitarist and session musician.
- October 4 – Loretta Lynn, 90, American country singer-songwriter ("Coal Miner's Daughter", "Fist City", "You Ain't Woman Enough (To Take My Man)")
- October 6 – Jody Miller, 80, American country singer ("Queen of the House", "There's a Party Goin' On", "He's So Fine")
- October 11 – Anita Kerr, 94, American singer, composer, arranger and music producer known for developing the Nashville sound.
- October 24 – Don Edwards, 86, cowboy singer-songwriter.
- October 28 – Jerry Lee Lewis, 87, American rock & roll and country singer.
- October 31 – Patrick Haggerty, 77, member of gay country music band Lavender Country (stroke)
- November 7 – Jeff Cook, 73, member of Alabama (Parkinson's disease)
- November 27 – Jake Flint, 37, Red Dirt singer-songwriter.
- December 6 – Peter Cooper, 52, historian, musician and journalist.
- December 15 – Shirley Eikhard, 67, Canadian singer-songwriter ("Something to Talk About")
- December 19 – Charlie Monk, 84, American broadcaster, songwriter, music publisher
- December 29 – Ian Tyson, 89, Canadian singer-songwriter ("Four Strong Winds" and "Someday Soon")
- December 31 – Anita Pointer, 74, member of The Pointer Sisters who had country hits with "Fairytale" and "Two Many Times"

== Hall of Fame inductees ==
=== Country Music Hall of Fame ===
(presented on October 16, 2022)

- Joe Galante
- Jerry Lee Lewis
- Keith Whitley

=== Canadian Country Music Hall of Fame ===
(announced on June 7, 2022)

- George Fox
- Randall Prescott

=== International Bluegrass Music Hall of Fame ===
(announced on July 26, 2022)

- Norman Blake
- Paul "Moon" Mullins
- Peter Rowan

=== Nashville Songwriters Hall of Fame ===
(presented October 30, 2022)

- Hillary Lindsey
- David Malloy
- Gary Nicholson
- Shania Twain
- Steve Wariner

== Major awards ==
=== Academy of Country Music Awards ===
(presented on May 11, 2023)

- Entertainer of the Year – Chris Stapleton
- Male Artist of the Year – Morgan Wallen
- Female Artist of the Year – Lainey Wilson
- Group of the Year – Old Dominion
- Duo of the Year – Brothers Osborne
- New Male Artist of the Year – Zach Bryan
- New Female Artist of the Year – Hailey Whitters
- Songwriter of the Year – Ashley Gorley
- Artist-Songwriter of the Year – Hardy
- Single of the Year – "She Had Me at Heads Carolina" (Cole Swindell)
- Song of the Year – "She Had Me at Heads Carolina" (Ashley Gorley, Cole Swindell, Jesse Frasure, Mark D. Sanders, Thomas Rhett and Tim Nichols)
- Album of the Year – Bell Bottom Country (Lainey Wilson)
- Musical Event of the Year – "Wait in the Truck" (Hardy & Lainey Wilson)
- Visual Media of the Year – "Wait in the Truck" (Hardy & Lainey Wilson)

=== Americana Music Honors & Awards ===
(presented on September 14, 2022)

- Artist of the Year – Billy Strings
- Duo/Group of the Year – The War and Treaty
- Album of the Year – Outside Child (Allison Russell)
- Song of the Year – "Right on Time" – (Brandi Carlile, Tim Hanseroth, Phil Hanseroth)
- Emerging Act of the Year – Sierra Ferrell
- Instrumentalist of the Year – Larissa Maestro (cello)
- President's Award – Don Williams
- Lifetime Achievement Award - Buddy Miller
- Free Speech/Inspiration Award – Indigo Girls
- Lifetime Achievement Award for Performance – Chris Isaak
- Lifetime Achievement Award for Producer/Engineer – Al Bell
- Legacy of Americana Award – The Fairfield Four

=== American Music Awards ===
(presented on November 20, 2022)

- Favorite Country Album – Red (Taylor's Version) (Taylor Swift)
- Favorite Country Song – "Wasted on You" (Morgan Wallen)
- Favorite Male Country Artist – Morgan Wallen
- Favorite Female Country Artist – Taylor Swift
- Favorite Country Duo/Group – Dan + Shay

=== ARIA Awards ===
(presented on November 24, 2022)

- Best Country Album - Light It Up (Casey Barnes)

=== Billboard Music Awards ===
(presented on May 15, 2022)

- Top Country Artist – Taylor Swift
- Top Male Country Artist – Morgan Wallen
- Top Female Country Artist – Taylor Swift
- Top Country Duo/Group – Dan + Shay
- Top Country Album – Red (Taylor's Version) (Taylor Swift)
- Top Country Song – "Fancy Like" (Walker Hayes)
- Top Country Tour – Gather Again Tour (Eric Church)

=== Canadian Country Music Association Awards ===
(presented on September 11, 2022)

- Entertainer of the Year - Tenille Townes
- Fan Choice - Dallas Smith
- Album of the Year - Masquerades (Tenille Townes)
- Alternative Country Album of the Year - Songs My Friends Wrote (Corb Lund)
- Male Artist of the Year - Dallas Smith
- Female Artist of the Year - Tenille Townes
- Group or Duo of the Year - The Reklaws
- Interactive Artist/Group of the Year - Hailey Benedict
- Rising Star - Andrew Hyatt
- Single of the Year - "Girl Who Didn't Care" (Tenille Townes)
- Songwriter of the Year - "Girl Who Didn't Care" ( Steph Jones, David Pramik, Tenille Townes)
- Video of the Year - "High School" (Nice Horse)
- Top Selling Canadian Album of the Year - Honkytonk Revival (Jade Eagleson)
- Top Selling Canadian Single of the Year - "What the Truck" (The Reklaws and Sacha)
- Producer of the Year - Danick Dupelle
- Guitar Player of the Year - Matt McKay
- Bass Player of the Year - Brandi Sidoryk
- Drummer of the Year - Matthew Atkins
- Fiddle Player of the Year - Denis Dufresne
- Steel Guitar Player of the Year - Mitch Jay
- Keyboard Player of the Year - Brendan Waters
- Specialty Instrument Player of the Year - Mitch Jay
- Top Selling International Album - Dangerous: The Double Album (Morgan Wallen)

=== CMT Music Awards ===
(presented on April 11, 2022)

- Video of the Year – "If I Didn't Love You" (Jason Aldean and Carrie Underwood)
- Male Video of the Year – "'Til You Can't" (Cody Johnson)
- Female Video of the Year – "If I Was a Cowboy" (Miranda Lambert)
- Duo/Group Video of the Year – "Woman You Got" (Maddie & Tae)
- Breakthrough Video of the Year – "To Be Loved by You" (Parker McCollum)
- Collaborative Video of the Year – "If I Didn't Love You" (Jason Aldean and Carrie Underwood)
- CMT Performance of the Year – "Is Anybody Goin' to San Antone" (George Strait from CMT Giants: Charley Pride)
- CMT Digital-First Performance of the Year – "Dear Rodeo" (Cody Johnson)
- Trending Comeback Song of the Year – "Love Story" (Taylor Swift)

CMT Artists of the Year
(presented October 14, 2022 in Nashville)

- Kane Brown
- Luke Combs
- Walker Hayes
- Carly Pearce
- Breakout Artist of the Year: Lainey Wilson
- Artist of a Lifetime: Alan Jackson

=== Country Music Association Awards ===
(presented on November 9, 2022)

- Entertainer of the Year – Luke Combs
- Male Vocalist of the Year – Chris Stapleton
- Female Vocalist of the Year – Lainey Wilson
- Vocal Group of the Year – Old Dominion
- New Artist of the Year – Lainey Wilson
- Vocal Duo of the Year – Brothers Osborne
- Musician of the Year – Jenee Fleenor (fiddle)
- Single of the Year – "'Til You Can't" (Cody Johnson)
- Song of the Year – "Buy Dirt" (Jacob Davis, Jordan Davis, Josh Jenkins, Matt Jenkins)
- Album of the Year – Growin' Up (Luke Combs)
- Musical Event of the Year – "Never Wanted to Be That Girl" (Carly Pearce and Ashley McBryde)
- Video of the Year – "'Til You Can't" (Cody Johnson)
- Willie Nelson Lifetime Achievement Award – Alan Jackson

=== Grammy Awards ===
(presented on February 5, 2023)

- Best Country Solo Performance – "Live Forever" (Willie Nelson)
- Best Country Duo/Group Performance – "Never Wanted to Be That Girl" (Carly Pearce and Ashley McBryde)
- Best Country Song – "'Til You Can't" (Matt Rogers and Ben Stennis)
- Best Country Album – A Beautiful Time (Willie Nelson)
- Best Bluegrass Album – Crooked Tree (Molly Tuttle & Golden Highway)
- Best Americana Album – In These Silent Days (Brandi Carlile)
- Best American Roots Performance – "Stompin' Ground" (Aaron Neville with Dirty Dozen Brass Band)
- Best Americana Performance – "Made Up Mind" (Bonnie Raitt)
- Best American Roots Song – "Just Like That" (Bonnie Raitt)
- Best Roots Gospel Album – The Urban Hymnal (Tennessee State University Marching Band)

=== International Bluegrass Music Awards ===
(presented on September 30, 2022)

- Entertainer of the Year – Billy Strings
- Male Vocalist of the Year – Del McCoury
- Female Vocalist of the Year – Molly Tuttle
- Vocal Group of the Year – Doyle Lawson and Quicksilver
- Instrumental Group of the Year – Béla Fleck's My Bluegrass Heart
- New Artist of the Year – Rick Faris
- Album of the Year – My Bluegrass Heart (Béla Fleck)
- Song of the Year – "Red Daisy" (Billy Strings, Jarrod Walker, Christian Ward)
- Gospel Recording of the Year – "In the Sweet By-and-By" (Dolly Parton with Carl Jackson, Larry Cordle, Bradley Walker and Jerry Salley)
- Instrumental Recording of the Year – "Vertigo" (Béla Fleck featuring Sam Bush, Stuart Duncan, Edgar Meyer and Bryan Sutton)
- Collaborative Recording of the Year – "In the Sweet By-and-By" (Dolly Parton with Carl Jackson, Larry Cordle, Bradley Walker and Jerry Salley)
- Guitar Player of the Year – Cody Kilby
- Banjo Player of the Year – Béla Fleck
- Fiddle Player of the Year – Bronwyn Keith-Hynes
- Mandolin Player of the Year – Sierra Hull
- Bass Player of the Year – Jason Moore
- Resophonic Guitar Player of the Year – Justin Moses

=== Juno Awards ===
(presented on March 13, 2023)

- Country Album of the Year - Masquerades (Tenille Townes)

=== Hollywood Walk of Fame ===
Stars who were honored in 2022

Kelly Clarkson

=== Kennedy Center Honors ===
country stars who were honored in 2022

Amy Grant
