= Rebel Child =

Rebel Child may refer to:

- Rebel Child, a 2014 album by Blackjack Billy
- Rebel Child, a 2017 album by Tenille Arts (or the title track of this album)
- The Rebel Child, a 1984 rock opera by Alan Simon
- "Rebel Child", a song from Gretchen Wilson's 2005 album, All Jacked Up
- Rebel Child, a 2013 novel by Jaye Wells (under the pen name Kate Eden)
- Rebel Child Productions, an independent film production company co-founded by Amir Mann
