= Parol (disambiguation) =

A parol is a Christmas lantern from the Philippines.

Parol may also refer to:

- Island in the Sulu Archipelago in the Philippines
- The parol evidence rule in contract law
- Tina Parol, American singer-songwriter
