= Jersey on the Wall (I'm Just Asking) =

2019 song by Tenille Townes

Single by Tenille Townes

from the album The Lemonade Stand
- Released: September 9, 2019
- Genre: Country
- Length: 4:05
- Label: Columbia Nashville
- Songwriter(s): Tenille Townes; Gordie Sampson; Tina Parol
- Producer(s): Jay Joyce

Tenille Townes singles chronology
"White Horse" (2019)	"Jersey on the Wall (I'm Just Asking)" (2019)	"The Most Beautiful Things" (2020)

Music video
- "Jersey on the Wall (I'm Just Asking)" on YouTube

"Jersey on the Wall (I'm Just Asking)" is a song co-written and recorded by Canadian country artist Tenille Townes. The song was co-written with Gordie Sampson and Tina Parol. It was the third single from Townes' studio album The Lemonade Stand, and her second number-one hit on the Billboard Canada Country chart.

== Background ==
Several years before the song's release, Townes performed for a high school in Grand Manan, New Brunswick. After hanging out with several students during the day, she learned afterwards that four of them were survivors of a car crash in which the driver, a 17-year old star of the town’s basketball team and the valedictorian, was killed. Townes bonded with the group, and returned the next year to attend commencement. She remarked that upon seeing the late girl's Jersey hanging on the wall, she "looked at it and just thought about questions I had for God". In October 2016, she had a writing session with co-writers Gordie Sampson and Tina Parol, and according to Parol, set out on writing a song "about trusting [God] even when you don’t understand why something so awful could happen to someone so good".

== Critical reception ==
"Jersey on the Wall (I'm Just Asking)" was released to largely positive reviews, mostly praising it for asking tough questions and speaking the truth. Marissa R. Moss of Rolling Stone called the song "a moment of country music existentialism". Bobby Moore of The Boot said the track is "one of the few newer songs worthy of the old descriptor "three chords and the truth"". Kerry Doole of FYI Music News stated that Townes' "understated vocal performance places full emphasis on the powerful lyrics". "Jersey in the Wall (I'm Just Asking)" won Tenille, Tina, and Gordie the 2020 CCMA for Songwriters of the Year.

== Music video ==
The official music video for "Jersey on the Wall (I'm Just Asking)" was directed by Mason Dixon and premiered on September 30, 2019. It features Townes singing in a high school gymnasium. The video won "Video of the Year" at the 2020 CCMA Awards.

== Chart performance ==
"Jersey on the Wall (I'm Just Asking)" reached number one on the Billboard Canada Country chart for the week of February 1, 2020, making it her second number-one hit after "Somebody's Daughter". It also peaked at number 88 on the Canadian Hot 100.

== Charts ==
Chart performance for "Jersey on the Wall (I'm Just Asking)"
Chart (2020)	Peak position
Canada (Canadian Hot 100)	88
Canada Country (Billboard)	1

== Certifications and sales ==
Certifications and sales for "Jersey on the Wall (I'm Just Asking)"
Region	Certification	Certified units/sales
Canada (Music Canada)	Platinum	80,000^{‡}
^{‡} Sales+streaming figures based on certification alone.
