= The Acrobat (album) =

Studio album by Tenille Townes
- Released: April 10, 2026
- Recorded: 2025–2026
- Genre: Country
- Label: Township Records
- Producer: Tenille Townes

Tenille Townes chronology
The Lemonade Stand (2020)	The Acrobat (2026)

Singles from The Acrobat
- 1. "Enabling" Released: January 16, 2026; 2. "The Acrobat" Released: February 27, 2026

The Acrobat is the fourth studio album by Canadian country music singer-songwriter Tenille Townes. It was released on April 10, 2026, via Township Records, and is Townes' first full-length project in six years, following 2020's The Lemonade Stand. Townes co-wrote all ten tracks on the album, played every instrument, and recorded, mixed, and produced it by herself. It was preceded by the singles "Enabling", and the title track. The album has been described as Townes' most stripped back and personal to date.

== Background ==
After seven years with Sony Music Nashville, Townes and the label parted ways, reportedly due to failing to gain career traction in the United States despite commercial success and critical acclaim in her native Canada. Townes shared the news on Instagram on August 26, 2025, explaining that she and the label "[hadn't] been seeing eye to eye" for some time, which had impacted her creativity and ability to release music.

Townes released "Enabling", an emotional track about the emotional cost of loving someone at the expense of yourself, on January 16, 2026. Describing the song in a press release, Townes explained, "This song is me confronting a lifelong habit of putting others’ needs above my own. Writing it helped me realize that love isn't self-sacrifice... sometimes the most loving thing you can do is stand your ground and choose yourself. It also came from realizing how often I'd lost myself trying to rescue the people I loved. I spent so much of my life reading the room, changing myself to keep everyone happy, and avoiding my own feelings in the process. This song is the moment I finally saw that pattern clearly and chose to set boundaries: to love others without abandoning myself."

The album was officially announced on February 27, 2026, alongside the released of the title track, which features American songwriter Lori McKenna. Of the song, Townes stated, "The Acrobat is about the slow erosion that comes from trying to become what someone else needs, constantly balancing, bending, and reshaping yourself The quiet whisper to the character in this song that I hope people hear, is that you don’t have to contort yourself to be worthy of love. That’s what I needed to hear in my struggles with self abandonment and writing this with Lori from a channeled observer perspective helped me get back to that belief. Lori’s songwriting has deeply shaped the way I hear music and tell the truth. She is a true hero of mine and has been a compass influence since I first moved to Nashville. Writing this song with her, and feeling her presence on it as a vocalist, makes this release an incredibly meaningful, full-circle moment for me."

== Track listing ==
The Acrobat track listing
No.	Title	Writer(s)	Length
1.	"Ordinary Love Song"	Daniel Tashian; Tenille Townes
2.	"The Acrobat" (featuring Lori McKenna)	Lori McKenna; Townes	3:54
3.	"Enabling"	Townes	3:18
4.	"We Could Use a Little More"	Townes
5.	"Lonely Talking"	Andy Skib; Townes
6.	"She Plays the Piano"	McKenna; Alex Stacey; Townes; Amy Wadge
7.	"Grey Like Emmylou" (featuring I'm with Her)	Kat Higgins; Jordyn Shelhart; Townes
8.	"What's Meant for You"	Keelan Donovan; Townes
9.	"In Love With the Sky"	McKenna; Townes
10.	"If You're Hearing This"	Townes

Notes

- All track titles are stylized in all lowercase.
