= Girl Who Didn't Care =

2021 song by Tenille Townes

Single by Tenille Townes
- Released: June 25, 2021
- Length: 3:12
- Label: Columbia Nashville; RCA
- Songwriter(s): Tenille Townes; David Pramik; Steph Jones
- Producer(s): David Pramik

Tenille Townes singles chronology
"Come as You Are" (2020)	"Girl Who Didn't Care" (2021)	"When's It Gonna Happen" (2022)

Music video
- "Girl Who Didn't Care" on YouTube

"Girl Who Didn't Care" is a song co-written and recorded by Canadian country artist Tenille Townes. She wrote the song with Steph Jones and David Pramik. The song marked her first release of new music since her debut US studio album The Lemonade Stand.

== Background ==
Townes and her collaborators co-wrote "Girl Who Didn't Care" over Zoom during the COVID-19 pandemic. According to Townes, the song is about "how you used to see yourself and everything around you before the world and society and somebody else changed your idea of it". She wrote the song specifically for young girls, noting inspiration from her childhood. She stated: "I feel grateful to have been encouraged during that sweet spot in my life and to be able to remember that little girl who dreamed of singing on stage. I think about her a lot, looking for more of that courage in my life right now". Townes also noted inspiration from walking around her neighbourhood and seeing children and the "wonder and the courage that they have to just see the world as something awesome", saying it's "something that I want more of in my life now". She stated that with this song and "chapter" of her music, it would be "more personal this time around".

== Critical reception ==
Robyn Collins of Taste of Country said that the song "takes a nostalgic look at the childlike self who exists before life gets in the way". Vernell Hackett of Sounds Like Nashville described the track as "an inspirational message to young girls, encouraging them to chase those dreams they have in their heart". Matt Bjorke of Roughstock stated "this song showcases why Tenille Townes is one of country music's most-exciting newcomers". Lauren Jo Black of Country Now said the song "boasts the kind of message we all need to hear right now".

== Accolades ==
Year	Association	Category	Result	Ref
2022	CCMA	Single Of The Year	Won	
2022	CCMA	Songwriter(s) of the Year	Won	
2022	CCMA	Video of the Year	Nominated	

== Commercial performance ==
"Girl Who Didn't Care" peaked at number five on the Billboard Canada Country chart for the week of October 30, 2021, marking Townes' fifth career top ten hit. It peaked at number 86 on the Canadian Hot 100 in the same week. It also reached number 38 on the TMN Country Hot 50 in Australia.

== Music video ==
The official music video for "Girl Who Didn’t Care" was directed by Mason Dixon and premiered on July 28, 2021. The video features girls growing up in pursuit of their dreams, and stars space enthusiast Alyssa Carson, college soccer goalkeeper Sarah Fuller, and firefighter Shannon Wells as the real-life women who are living their childhood dreams.

== Charts ==
Chart performance for "Girl Who Didn’t Care"
Chart (2021)	Peak position
Australia Country Hot 50 (TMN)	38
Canada (Canadian Hot 100)	86
Canada Country (Billboard)	5
