= The Last Time (Tenille Townes song) =

2022 song by Tenille Townes

Single by Tenille Townes
- Released: September 2, 2022
- Genre: Country
- Length: 3:30
- Label: Columbia Nashville
- Songwriter(s): Tenille Townes; Ben Goldsmith; Gordie Sampson
- Producer(s): Gordie Sampson; Pete Good

Tenille Townes singles chronology
"When's It Gonna Happen" (2022)	"The Last Time" (2022)	"The Thing That Wrecks You" (2023)

Lyric Video
- "The Last Time" on YouTube

"The Last Time" is a song co-written and recorded by Canadian country music artist Tenille Townes. She wrote the song with Ben Goldsmith and producer Gordie Sampson. The track was released to Canadian country radio and peaked at number 5, becoming her seventh top 10 single in the country.

== Background ==
Townes stated that she "wanted to write a song that captured that sentimental reality, with nostalgia in the fabric of the music," adding that it reminds her "to stop and take in the moments that are happening right now." She remarked that when writing the song, she was "thinking about how we put a frame around the memory of a first time … and how sometimes the last time can sneak up on us."

== Critical reception ==
Nick Cantwell of Belles and Gals described "The Last Time" as "a heartbreaking song which will no doubt be very relatable to most, describing the feeling of nostalgia you get once you realise a regular occurrence in your life won’t be happening again for whatever reason." An uncredited review in Today's Country Magazine stated that the song "makes you think, it makes you feel, and it makes you want to hear it again and again". Melody Lau of CBC Music framed the song as an "emotional gut punch" that adds "to Townes' growing discography of moving anthems."

== Live performance ==
Townes performed "The Last Time" at the 2022 Canadian Country Music Awards at the Scotiabank Saddledome in Calgary, Alberta on September 11, 2022. The award show was broadcast live on Global in Canada, while a video of her performance was uploaded to YouTube on October 4, 2022.

== Charts ==
Chart performance for "The Last Time"
Chart (2022–2023)	Peak position
Canada (Canadian Hot 100)	91
Canada Country (Billboard)	5
