= Tina Parol =

American singer-songwriter

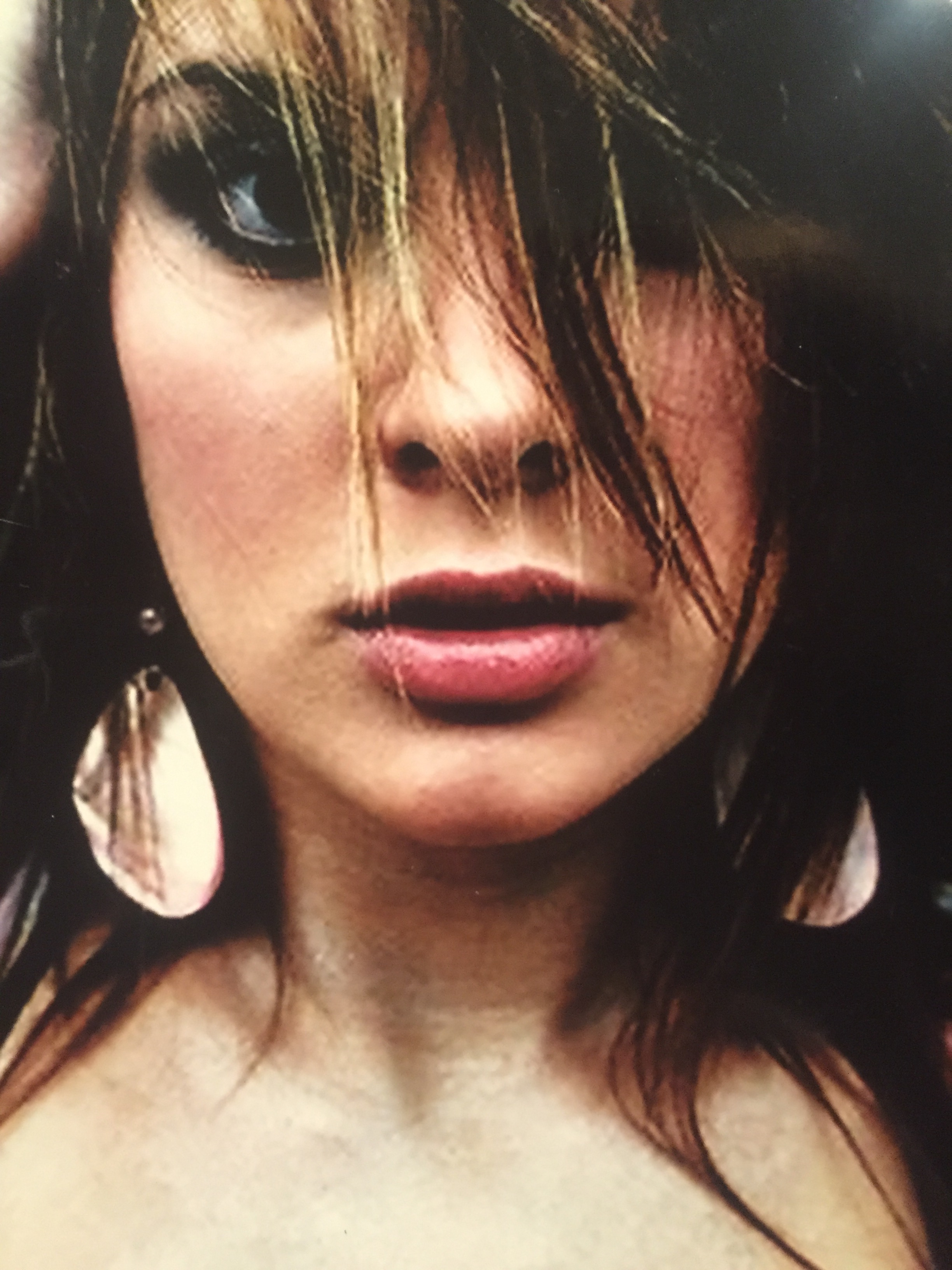
- Tina Parol

Background information
- Born: Tina Annetta Borusowski; 1988 (age 37–38); New Jersey, U.S.
- Origin: West Seneca, New York, U.S.
- Genres: Pop, Country
- Occupation: Singer-songwriter
- Instrument: Vocals
- Years active: 2009–present
- Labels: Universal Motown Records

Tina Annetta Parol (née Borusowski; 1988) is an American singer-songwriter and record producer.

== Biography ==
Parol is a first generation American, born to Polish immigrants. She is still fluent in Polish. She was born in New Jersey and at age 2 moved to Buffalo, New York and grew up in West Seneca, New York. Parol attended New York University, enrolling in both the Clive Davis Department at Tisch School of the Arts, as well as NYU's Liberal Arts School. While still at NYU, Parol signed a record deal with Universal Motown which resulted in the pop radio single "Who's Got Your Money?", co-written and co-produced by Parol. The single charted to No. 34 on the Pop Airplay charts and had Parol touring around the country, opening for acts such as Flo Rida and Boys Like Girls. Soon Parol found her passion in songwriting taking her to Nashville, Tennessee, where she is a thriving member of the songwriting community. Her songs have been recorded by Britney Spears, Celine Dion, Sabrina Carpenter, Jamie Lynn Spears, Krewella, Jerrod Niemann, Dallas Smith, Kevin Rudolf, Haley Georgia and Jessie James Decker, to name a few. Her songs have also appeared on shows for Fox, ESPN, Lifetime, MTV, NBC, CBS, as well as two songs on ABC's "Nashville". Her song "Hold Onto Your Heart" appears in Touchstone Pictures's When in Rome. Tina co-wrote and performs "Live Your Story", Disney's Dream Big Princess franchise theme song. The song is frequently on The Disney Channel, is performed in Disney on Ice shows globally and is used at Disney's Hong Kong theme park. In 2020, along with Tenille Townes and Gordie Sampson, Tina won the CCMA for "Songwriter of the Year" for "Jersey on the Wall (I'm Just Asking)" performed by Tenille Townes. Tina co-wrote Lady A 's "Champagne Night", which was a #1 Billboard radio hit in both the USA and Canada and also went Gold in both countries. In 2025, Tina Parol was inducted into the Buffalo Music Hall of Fame. Tina Parol's own artist songs have been licensed to films, television shows, and ads over 250 times, making her a top sync music artist.

== Artist career ==
For her artist days, Parol cited artists such as Nelly Furtado, Bob Marley, Kanye West and M.I.A. as her biggest influences. Parol's other major musical influences are The Police, ABBA, Queen, and Tina Turner, whom Tina is named after. Critics have compared her to Pink. Parol toured with acts such as White Tie Affair, A Rocket to the Moon, The Audition, Cash Cash, Friday Night Boys, Kelsey and the Chaos, Mercy Mercedes, and Forever the Sickest Kids! She will also be performing at the 98 PXY Summer Jam Concert in Rochester, NY with artists such as Flo Rida and Boys Like Girls.

=== Studio albums ===
- Shrinking Violet (2010)

=== Singles ===
Year	Single	Peak chart positions					Album
Year	Single	US Hot	Billboard Hot Pop Songs	US AC	US Adult	CAN	Album
2009	"Who's Got Your Money"	—	34	—	—	—	Shrinking Violet
"—" denotes the single didn't chart.

== Songwriting discography ==
Songs co-written by Parol

Discography
Artist	Album	Song
Britney Spears	Circus (2008)	"Rock Boy”
Tenille Townes	The Lemonade Stand (2020)	"Jersey on the Wall”
Sabrina Carpenter	Silver Nights – Single (2014)	"Silver Nights"
Dallas Smith	Kids With Cars (2016)	"Cheap Seats"
Natalie Stovall and the Drive	Mason Jar – Single (2015)	"Mason Jar"
Jessie James Decker	Clint Eastwood – Single (2015)	"Clint Eastwood"
Kevin Rudolf	That Other Ship – Single (2016)	"That Other Ship"
Jamie Lynn Spears	Sleepover – Single (2016)	"Sleepover"
Nashville Cast	The Book (feat. Aubrey Peeples) – Single (2016)	"The Book"
Nashville Cast	Caged Bird (feat. Aubrey Peeples) – Single (2016)	"Caged Bird"
Adam Sanders	Somewhere That You Don't Go – Single (2015)	"Somewhere That You Don’t Go"
Jerrod Niemann	This Ride – Single (2017)	"The Regulars"
Jake Rose	Weekday Drunk (2018)	"Weekday Drunk"
Tina Parol	Live Your Story: Disney Dream Big Princess (2018)	"Live Your Story"
Celine Dion	Courage (2019)	"Soul"
Lady A	Champagne Night (2020)	"Champagne Night"
King Calaway	Midnight EP (2021)	"More People"
