= Back Then, Right Now =

Single by Tenille Arts

from the album Girl to Girl
- Released: May 24, 2021
- Genre: Country
- Length: 3:02
- Label: 19th & Grand
- Songwriters: Tenille Arts; Dave Pittenger; MacKenzie Porter; Parker Welling
- Producer: Dave Pittenger

Tenille Arts singles chronology
"Give It to Me Straight" (2021)	"Back Then, Right Now" (2021)	"Girl to Girl" (2022)

Music video
- "Back Then, Right Now" on YouTube

"Back Then, Right Now" is a song co-written and recorded by Canadian country music artist Tenille Arts. The song was written by Arts, along with Dave Pittenger, MacKenzie Porter and Parker Welling. It was released on May 24, 2021, as the second single in Canada and lead single in the United States from her fourth studio album Girl to Girl.

== Background ==
Arts stated the song was inspired by her upbringing in small town Saskatchewan, which she described as "really simple times" and "just like any other small town in America". The song was her follow-up single to her number one Mediabase Country hit "Somebody Like That" in the United States, and Arts admitted there was "a lot of pressure" when it came to picking the next single.

== Critical reception ==
Carena Liptak of Taste of Country described the song as "mid-tempo" and "gently swinging", saying it was Arts' take on the "classic country trope of nostalgia, conjuring up crisp images of the carefree nights".

== Commercial performance ==
"Back Then, Right Now" reached a peak of number 12 on the Billboard Canada Country chart for the week of February 12, 2022, spending 25 weeks on the chart in total and marking Arts' fourth career top 20 hit in her home country. It peaked at number 85 on the Canadian Hot 100 for the week of January 15, 2022, becoming her first charting entry on her national all-genre chart. In the United States, the song spent a total of 44 weeks on the Country Airplay chart, peaking at number 34 for the week of April 2, 2022.

== Music video ==
The official music video for "Back Then, Right Now" premiered on July 27, 2021. Arts stated that she had grown up dancing, but hadn't danced in a while. Despite being nervous, she learned the choreography for the dance in the video "pretty easily" and was ready after practicing before the video was shot.

== Charts ==
Chart performance for "Back Then, Right Now"
Chart (2022)	Peak position
Canada Hot 100 (Billboard)	85
Canada Country (Billboard)	12
US Country Airplay (Billboard)	34
