= Jealous of Myself =

Single by Tenille Arts

Single by Tenille Arts featuring LeAnn Rimes

from the album To Be Honest
- Released: January 9, 2023
- Genre: Country
- Length: 3:26
- Label: Dreamcatcher
- Songwriter(s): Emily Weisband; John Byron; Trevor Rosen
- Producer(s): Nathan Chapman

Tenille Arts featuring LeAnn Rimes singles chronology
"Girl to Girl" (2022)	"Jealous of Myself" (2023)	"Last Time Last" (2024)

Music video
- "Jealous of Myself" on YouTube

LeAnn Rimes singles chronology
"Spaceship" (2022)	"Jealous of Myself" (2023)

Alternative cover
- Cover for duet with LeAnn Rimes

"Jealous of Myself" is a song recorded by Canadian country music artist Tenille Arts. The song was written by Emily Weisband, John Byron, and Trevor Rosen, while Nathan Chapman produced the track. It marks Arts' first release after signing with Dreamcatcher Artists. The song was released as a single to U.S. country radio on January 9, 2023. A new version of the song featuring American singer LeAnn Rimes was released in April 2023. The duet version charted on the Country Airplay chart, and was also sent as a single to Canadian country radio in May 2023. It served as the lead single off Arts' 2024 album, To Be Honest.

== Background and release ==
One of the song's co-writers, John Byron, discovered that an ex-girlfriend of eight years was now dating a man who was moving to Nashville from Colorado to be near her. This inspired the "Jealous of Myself" title, as Byron felt "jealous of him," but "definitely more jealous of me when I did have her." He held onto the title for a writing appointment on January 13, 2022, with Emily Weisband, hoping a woman's perspective would give the song more vulnerability. Byron and Trevor Rosen were initially working with a guitar on the song, but Weisband decided to play the piano which prompted them to use that on the song instead.

Weisband elected to post a demo of "Jealous of Myself" on social media platform TikTok, asking viewers who they thought should sing the song. Arts responded with a comment that said "Ummm, you. Or me. Lol," but was serious in her desire to sing the song. After Arts' team asked the writers if she could sing the song, she began working with producer Nathan Chapman on recording the track. He wanted to pursue a pop sound with the track, but Arts eventually asked him to incorporate the steel guitar into it to make it sound more country and emotional. She believed it "was a good time in [her] life to come with a ballad."

Arts debuted the song at the CMA Music Festival in June 2022, and properly released it in October 2022. It is set to be included on an extended play or album in 2023. She sold hand-painted denim jackets on her website to promote the release of the song.

== Critical reception ==
Autumn Smith of The Nash News favourably reviewed the song, describing it as a "powerful anthem of missing someone that used to be a loved one," adding that "combination of [Arts'] soulful and passionate vocals with moody instrumentals curates the story that she's trying to tell." She added that "it's easy to be hooked on this new song and play it on repeat." Cherise Richards of WQMZ said that Arts sings "with such passionate vocals that you can't help but feel" the emotion of the song. An uncredited review from All Country News stated that the track "features poignant and relatable themes, painfully detailed lyrics, and minimalistic production that allows Arts' voice to shine," adding that Arts has "phenomenal vocal technique" and "puts raw emotion behind every lyric and note." Jenna Weishar of Front Porch Music remarked that it is "hard not to be drawn to the emotional value" of the song, and having heard her perform it live, she stated that the "intimate experience of sharing this song with her audience has leveled [Arts] up as a performer."

== Track listings ==
Digital download – single

1. "Jealous of Myself" – 3:26

Digital download – single

1. "Jealous of Myself" (featuring LeAnn Rimes) – 3:26

Dave Aude Remix – single

1. "Jealous of Myself" (Dave Aude Remix) – 3:59

== Charts ==
Chart performance for "Jealous of Myself"
Chart (2023)	Peak position
Canada Country (Billboard)	43
US Country Airplay (Billboard)	56
