= Give It to Me Straight =

2021 song by Tenille Arts

Single by Tenille Arts

from the album Girl to Girl
- Released: February 19, 2021
- Genre: Country
- Length: 3:13
- Label: 19th & Grand
- Songwriter(s): Tenille Arts; Dave Pittenger; Allison Veltz
- Producer(s): Dave Pittenger

Tenille Arts singles chronology
| "Everybody Knows Everybody" (2020) | "Give It to Me Straight" (2021) | "Back Then, Right Now" (2021) |

Music video
- "Give It to Me Straight" on YouTube

Alternative cover

"Give It to Me Straight" is a song co-written and recorded by Canadian country artist Tenille Arts. The song was co-written with Dave Pittenger and Allison Veltz. It was only released to radio in Canada, where it was the lead single off her third studio album Girl to Girl.

== Background ==
Arts described the track as a "pre-breakup song" saying it is about "when you just want someone to cut to the chase and tell you why you’re really breaking up".

== Critical reception ==
Jonathan Andre of 365 Days of Inspiring Media called the song "catchy and compelling", saying it "hits all the right notes".

== Music video ==
The official music video for "Give It to Me Straight" features Arts singing in many different outfits and was directed by Grant Claire. It premiered on April 19, 2021.

== Charts ==
"Give It to Me Straight" reached a peak of number six on the Billboard Canada Country chart dated July 24, 2021, marking Arts' biggest hit in her home country to date.

| Chart (2021) | Peak position |
|---|---|
| Canada Country (Billboard) | 6 |
