= Girl to Girl =

2021 studio album by Tenille Arts

Studio album by Tenille Arts
- Released: October 21, 2021
- Genre: Country; country pop
- Length: 42:41
- Label: 19th & Grand
- Producer: Dave Pittenger (tracks 1, 8, 10); Alex Kline (track 2-3, 5, 7-9, 12); Nathan Chapman (tracks 4, 6, 13); A.J. Babcock (track 11)

Tenille Arts chronology
Love, Heartbreak, & Everything in Between (2020)	Girl to Girl (2021)	To Be Honest (2024)

Singles from Girl to Girl
- 1. "Give It to Me Straight" Released: February 19, 2021; 2. "Back Then, Right Now" Released: May 24, 2021; 3. "Girl to Girl" Released: November 1, 2022

Girl to Girl is the third studio album by Canadian country music artist Tenille Arts. It was released on October 11, 2021, via 19th & Grand Records and Empire Distribution, and includes the singles "Give It to Me Straight", "Back Then, Right Now", and "Girl to the Girl". Arts co-wrote every song on the album.

== Background ==
Arts experienced unexpected time away from touring amidst the COVID-19 pandemic and began reflecting on her teenage years. She began writing songs that she "[wished she] had back then," perceiving the album as a letter to her "current and younger self." Arts stated that if one listened to the album in order from "Back Then, Right Now" to "Growing Old Young," they would be listening to her "life from right now to back then," while reversing the order would be a "chronological order" of how she "got to where [she] is today." She added that she wanted to write "like a big sister," sharing her experiences "in hopes that people would feel less alone."

== Critical reception ==
Nicole Piering of Country Swag reviewed the song favourably, stating that Arts "deftly embraces the relatability and country hooks that have made superstars out of the likes of Taylor Swift and Kelsea Ballerini." She added that the "authentic songwriting" puts her "in a league others rarely play in." Jacques Wang of The Insider stated that in comparison to Arts' previous two albums, Girl to Girl "adds an extra charm by sharing listeners a taste of personal life lessons. He recommended the album for "fans of modern contemporary country music and those who wish to experience the vast world of country music for the first time." Lesley Janes of The Nash News spoke positively of the album, saying that that Arts "bears her heart with every song, keeping her younger fans in mind as well as her peers." Imogen Marshall of Off the Record stated that while there was not "a huge amount of [sonic] variety" on the album, it was still a "delightfully charming album that will no doubt elevate Arts' career," due to the "tenderness with which she crafts her letter to her younger self."

== Track listing ==
Girl to Girl
No.	Title	Writer(s)	Length
1.	"Back Then, Right Now"	Tenille Arts, Dave Pittenger, MacKenzie Porter, Parker Welling	3:02
2.	"That's My Friend You're Talking About"	Arts, Alex Kline, Allison Veltz	3:15
3.	"One Bedroom Apartment"	Arts, Kline, Palmer Lee	3:37
4.	"Breakup Songs" (featuring Callista Clark)	Arts, Jason Massey, Nick Wayne	3:12
5.	"Life Goes Like That"	Arts, Kline, Veltz	3:06
6.	"Girl to Girl"	Arts, Trannie Anderson, Ben Goldsmith	3:17
7.	"Heartbreak Regulars"	Arts, Lee, Holden James	3:41
8.	"Mama's Boy"	Arts, Kline, Pittenger, Veltz	3:19
9.	"Over You is You" (featuring Matt Stell)	Arts, Kline, Pittenger, Ben Stennis	3:05
10.	"Give It to Me Straight"	Arts, Pittenger, Veltz	3:14
11.	"High School Sweethart"	Arts, A.J. Babcock, Brandon Ratcliff	3:18
12.	"Sweet Sixteen"	Arts, Kline, Veltz	3:14
13.	"Growing Old Young"	Arts, Ray Fulcher, Shane Sniteman	3:26
Total length:			42:41

== Charts ==
=== Singles ===
Chart performance for singles from Girl to Girl
Year	Single	Peak chart positions		
Year	Single	CAN	CAN Country	US Country Airplay
2021	"Give It to Me Straight"	—	6	—
2021	"Back Then, Right Now"	85	12	34
2022	"Girl to Girl"	—	10	—
"—" denotes a single that did not chart or was not released to that territory.

== Awards and nominations ==
Year	Association	Category	Nominated work	Result	Ref.
2022	Juno Awards	Country Album of the Year	Girl to Girl	Nominated	

== Release history ==
Release formats for Girl to Girl
Country	Date	Format	Label	Ref.
Various	October 21, 2021	Digital download	19th & Grand Records	
Various	October 21, 2021	Streaming	19th & Grand Records	
Various	October 22, 2021	Compact disc	19th + Grand Records; Empire	
Various	June 3, 2022	LP record	19th + Grand Records; Empire	
