= Love, Heartbreak, & Everything in Between =

Studio album by Tenille Arts
- Released: January 10, 2020
- Genre: Country
- Length: 40:48
- Label: 19th & Grand; Reviver
- Producer: Alex Kline (tracks 1, 4, 9–12); Adam Wheeler (tracks 5–8); Matt Rovey (tracks 5–8); Derek George (track 3); Grant Vogelfanger (track 2)

Tenille Arts chronology
| Rebel Child (2017) | Love, Heartbreak, & Everything in Between (2020) | Girl to Girl (2021) |

Singles from Love, Heartbreak, & Everything in Between
- 1. "I Hate This" Released: July 24, 2018; 2. "Call You Names" Released: April 9, 2019; 3. "Somebody Like That" Released: September 27, 2019; 4. "Everybody Knows Everybody" Released: July 24, 2020

Professional ratings
Review scores
| Source | Rating |
|---|---|
| Country Perspective | 7/10 stars |
| The Musical Divide | 7/10 stars |

Love, Heartbreak, & Everything in Between is the second studio album by Canadian country music artist Tenille Arts. It was released on January 10, 2020, through 19th & Grand Records and Reviver Records. It includes the singles "I Hate This", "Call You Names", "Somebody Like That", and "Everybody Knows Everybody".

== Track listing ==
Adapted from Spotify.
| No. | Title | Writer(s) | Length |
|---|---|---|---|
| 1. | "Somebody Like That" | Tenille Arts; Allison Veltz; Alex Kline | 3:18 |
| 2. | "Slow It Down" | Arts; Josh Logan; Grant Vogelfanger | 3:23 |
| 3. | "Wild Love" | Arts; Derek George; Palmer Lee | 3:48 |
| 4. | "Butterfly Effect" | Arts; Lizzy McAvoy; Adam Wheeler | 2:28 |
| 5. | "I Hate This" | Arts; Wheeler | 3:08 |
| 6. | "Nothing to See Here" | Arts; Whitney Duncan | 3:17 |
| 7. | "Another Life" | Arts | 4:36 |
| 8. | "Right Guy Wrong Time" | Arts | 3:39 |
| 9. | "Call You Names" | Arts; James T. Slater | 3:50 |
| 10. | "Missing You" | Arts; Veltz; Kline | 2:57 |
| 11. | "Wouldn't You Like to Know" | Arts; Veltz; Kline | 3:00 |
| 12. | "Everybody Knows Everybody" | Arts; Veltz; Kline | 3:19 |
| Total length: | | | 40:48 |

== Charts ==
Sales chart performance for Love, Heartbreak, & Everything in Between
| Chart (2020) | Peak position |
|---|---|
| US Heatseekers Albums (Billboard) | 19 |

Chart performance for singles from Love, Heartbreak, & Everything in Between
| Year | Single | Peak chart positions | | | | |
| Year | Single | CAN Country | CAN Digital | US Country | US Country Airplay | US |
|---|---|---|---|---|---|---|
| 2018 | "I Hate This" | — | 49 | 41 | — | — |
| 2019 | "Call You Names" | — | — | — | — | — |
| 2019 | "Somebody Like That" | 9 | — | 7 | 3 | 62 |
| 2020 | "Everybody Knows Everybody" | 12 | — | — | — | — |
"—" denotes a single that did not chart or was not released to that territory.

== Release history ==
Release formats for Love, Heartbreak, & Everything in Between
| Country | Date | Format | Label | Ref. |
|---|---|---|---|---|
| Various | January 10, 2020 | Compact disc | Reviver Records; 19th & Grand Records | |
| Various | January 10, 2020 | Digital download | Reviver Records; 19th & Grand Records | |
| Various | January 10, 2020 | Streaming | Reviver Records; 19th & Grand Records | |
