= Rebel Child (Tenille Arts album) =

Studio album by Tenille Arts
- Released: October 27, 2017
- Genre: Country
- Length: 35:21
- Label: 19th & Grand
- Producer: Hal Oven (Exec.); Adam Wheeler

Tenille Arts chronology
Tenille Arts (2016)	Rebel Child (2017)	Love, Heartbreak, & Everything in Between (2020)

Singles from Rebel Child
- 1. "Cold Feet" Released: July 21, 2017; 2. "Moment of Weakness" Released: January 26, 2018

Rebel Child is the debut studio album recorded by Canadian singer and songwriter Tenille Arts. It was first released October 27, 2017 through the independent label imprint 19th & Grand. Arts co-wrote every track except for the lead single, "Cold Feet". A deluxe edition of the album was later issued on February 9, 2018, with additional tracks including the second single, "Moment of Weakness" and a cover of "Black Velvet".

Rebel Child entered the Billboard Country Album Sales chart at number 45 in 2019.

== Promotion ==
"Cold Feet" was released on July 21, 2017, as the record's lead single. The song also serves as Arts's debut American single. "Cold Feet" received praise from music critics and was featured in a "Makin' Tracks" article in the Billboard Country Update, a first for an independent release.

A new track, "Moment of Weakness", was released as a single on January 26, 2018. Three days later, the song was featured in an episode of the 22nd season of the American reality television series, The Bachelor. Exposure from the show and resulting media coverage caused the song to enter the top 10 of the country music sales charts in Canada and generated renewed interest in Rebel Child and her self-titled debut extended play (2016). Two versions of the song were included on a deluxe edition reissue of the album in February 2018. Her appearance on the show contributed to Arts being signed to Reviver Records.

== Accolades ==
Arts earned three awards for the album and its tracks at the 2018 Saskatchewan Country Music Association awards, including Album of the Year, Songwriter of the Year (for "Raindrops, Dirt Roads"), and Video of the Year ("Cold Feet").

== Track listing ==
No.	Title	Writer(s)	Length
1.	"Rebel Child"	Tenille Arts; Adam Wheeler	3:37
2.	"Outta My Mind"	Arts; Wheeler; Mark Narmore	2:47
3.	"Run Out of You"	Arts; Wheeler	3:12
4.	"There's This Boy"	Arts; Lydia Dall; Holly Auna	2:56
5.	"Alabama"	Arts; Wheeler; Narmore	3:29
6.	"Raindrops, Dirt Roads"	Arts; Wheeler; Narmore	3:00
7.	"Good About It"	Arts; Wheeler; Chris Carminiti	3:00
8.	"Steal a Heart"	Arts; Wheeler; Doug Wilhite	3:08
9.	"Red Flag White"	Arts; Narmore	3:57
10.	"Good Guys"	Arts; Wheeler; Buddy Owens	2:48
11.	"Cold Feet"	Wheeler; John Ritter	3:27
Total length:			35:21

Rebel Child (Deluxe Edition)
No.	Title	Writer(s)	Length
1.	"Rebel Child"	Arts; Wheeler	3:37
2.	"Outta My Mind"	Arts; Wheeler; Narmore	2:47
3.	"Run Out of You"	Arts; Wheeler	3:12
4.	"There's This Boy"	Arts; Dall; Stewart	2:56
5.	"Moment of Weakness"	Arts; Wheeler; Rick Huckaby	3:28
6.	"Alabama"	Arts; Wheeler; Narmore	3:29
7.	"Raindrops, Dirt Roads"	Arts; Wheeler; Narmore	3:00
8.	"Good About It"	Arts; Wheeler; Carminiti	3:00
9.	"Steal a Heart"	Arts; Wheeler; Wilhite	3:08
10.	"Red Flag White"	Arts; Narmore	3:57
11.	"Good Guys"	Arts; Wheeler; Owens	2:48
12.	"Cold Feet"	Wheeler; Ritter	3:27
13.	"Black Velvet"	Christopher Ward; David Tyson	4:09
14.	"Wildfire and Whiskey"	Arts; Jason Massey	3:22
15.	"Moment of Weakness" (acoustic)	Arts; Wheeler; Huckaby	3:34
Total length:			49:54

== Charts ==
Chart (2019)	Peak position
US Country Album Sales (Billboard)	45
