= Somebody Like That (song) =

2019 song by Tenille Arts

Single by Tenille Arts

from the album Love, Heartbreak, & Everything in Between
- Released: September 27, 2019 (Note: The track was not officially sent to radio formats in the United States until January 13, 2020.)
- Genre: Country
- Length: 3:18
- Label: 19th & Grand; Reviver
- Songwriters: Tenille Arts; Allison Veltz; Alex Kline
- Producer: Alex Kline

Tenille Arts singles chronology
"Call You Names" (2019)	"Somebody Like That" (2019)	"Everybody Knows Everybody" (2020)

Music video
- "Somebody Like That" on YouTube

"Somebody Like That" is a song co-written and recorded by the Canadian country music artist Tenille Arts. The song was co-written with Allison Veltz, as well as the track's producer Alex Kline. It was the third single from Arts' second album Love, Heartbreak, & Everything in Between. Kline made history in January 2021 as the first solo female producer to have a song performed by a female artist reach the top 15 on American country radio. In April 2021, the song hit #1 on the Mediabase Country Aircheck chart in the U.S., giving Arts the first #1 for a Canadian artist since Emerson Drive's "Moments" in 2007.

== Background ==
Arts remarked that she and her co-writers wanted to get away from writing break-up songs and wanted to "write something positive that was uptempo and fun, but still had substance to it, and was still... a really positive way of looking at love". The song is about searching for "epic love that lasts a lifetime" and not settling until you find it. Arts and her co-writers took inspiration from couples they looked up to, including their parents and grandparents.

== Critical reception ==
Billy Dukes of Taste of Country called the track "a love song presented with great confidence and heart". The song was named Top Country Pick of the Week on January 10, 2020.

== Commercial performance ==
"Somebody Like That" peaked at number 9 on the Billboard Canada Country chart. It has reached peaks of number 3 on Country Airplay, number 9 on Hot Country Songs, and number 50 on the Billboard Hot 100 in the United States.

== Release and promotion ==
"Somebody Like That" was released to digital retailers and streaming platforms on September 27, 2019, and was shortly released to Canadian country radio after. 19th & Grand Records and Reviver Records jointly released the song to American country radio on January 13, 2020. In late April, Reviver split with Arts' promotion and label team, and the song was solely promoted by 19th & Grand afterwards.

== Track listings ==
Digital download – single

1. "Somebody Like That" – 3:18

Digital download – single

1. "Somebody Like That" (acoustic) – 3:14

== Charts ==
=== Weekly charts ===
Weekly chart performance for "Somebody Like That"
Chart (2020–2021)	Peak position
Canada Country (Billboard)	9
US Billboard Hot 100	50
US Country Airplay (Billboard)	3
US Hot Country Songs (Billboard)	7

=== Year-end charts ===
Year-end chart performance for "Somebody Like That"
Chart (2021)	Position
US Country Airplay (Billboard)	35
US Hot Country Songs (Billboard)	45

== Certifications ==
Region	Certification	Certified units/sales
United States (RIAA)	Platinum	1,000,000^{‡}
^{‡} Sales+streaming figures based on certification alone.
