= Somebody's Daughter (song) =

Single by Tenille Townes

from the album The Lemonade Stand
- Released: September 24, 2018
- Genre: Country
- Length: 3:47
- Label: Columbia Nashville
- Songwriter(s): Tenille Townes; Barry Dean; Luke Laird
- Producer(s): Jay Joyce

Tenille Townes singles chronology
"Halfway to Somewhere" (2013)	"Somebody's Daughter" (2018)	"White Horse" (2019)

"Somebody's Daughter" is a song co-written and recorded by Canadian country music artist Tenille Townes. Released as a single after signing a deal with Columbia Nashville, it was her first radio single in five years and first to be promoted in the United States. The song was released on September 24, 2018 as the first single from her third studio album The Lemonade Stand.

== Content ==
Townes wrote the song with Barry Dean and Luke Laird, and was inspired by a drive Townes took with her mother where she saw a homeless girl holding a cardboard sign on a street corner that led to a conversation contemplating her backstory.

The song won the 2019 Canadian Country Music Association Awards for Single, Song, and Video of the Year, in addition to Townes winning for Female Artist of the Year.

== Chart performance ==
"Somebody's Daughter" was Townes' first chart single in her native Canada where it reached number 92 on the Canadian Hot 100 and was a Number One hit on the Canadian Country chart dated February 2, 2019. It also made the top 30 of both the Billboard Hot Country Songs and Country Airplay charts.

=== Weekly charts ===
Chart (2018–2019)	Peak position
Australia Country (TMN)	4
Canada (Canadian Hot 100)	92
Canada Country (Billboard)	1
US Country Airplay (Billboard)	26
US Hot Country Songs (Billboard)	29

=== Year-end charts ===
Chart (2019)	Position
US Hot Country Songs (Billboard)	87

== Certifications and sales ==
Region	Certification	Certified units/sales
Canada (Music Canada)	Platinum	80,000^{‡}
United States (RIAA)	Gold	500,000^{‡}
^{‡} Sales+streaming figures based on certification alone.
