= Jake Flint =

American country singer (1984/1985–2022)

Jake Flint (1985 – November 27, 2022) was an American Red Dirt country singer.

Flint was raised in Holdenville, Oklahoma. His father, Douglas J. Flint, was a wildcat oilman. Flint moved with his family to Tulsa in the early 1990s, where he attended Metro Christian Academy.

Flint died in his sleep, of accidental alcohol poisoning, a few hours after his wedding to Brenda Flint, on November 27, 2022, at the age of 37.

== Albums ==
- I'm Not OK (2016)
- Jake Flint (2020)
