= When's It Gonna Happen =

2022 song by Tenille Townes

Single by Tenille Townes

from the EP Masquerades
- Released: January 14, 2022
- Genre: Country pop
- Length: 3:37
- Label: Columbia Nashville; Sony Canada
- Songwriter(s): Tenille Townes; Steph Jones; Stephen Wrabel
- Producer(s): Pete Good

Tenille Townes singles chronology
"Girl Who Didn't Care" (2021)	"When's It Gonna Happen" (2022)	"The Last Time" (2022)

Music video
- "When's It Gonna Happen" on YouTube

"When's It Gonna Happen" is a song co-written and recorded by Canadian country artist Tenille Townes. She wrote the track with Steph Jones and Wrabel, while it was produced by Pete Good. It is the lead single off her 2022 extended play Masquerades.

== Background ==
Townes stated that she wrote "When's It Gonna Happen" because "it’s a real and true window into my life right now and how I feel sometimes about being single". She added that "there must be others who feel the same way I do," which is why she wanted to "create something that would speak to them too". She wrote the track while on a Zoom call with her co-writers and friends Steph Jones and Stephen Wrabel, drawing inspiration from her "getting a bunch of invitations in the mail to my friend’s weddings and how it feels like they are all getting married and having babies," with the writers posing the question: 'what if we wrote a song about what it feels like to not be in that same spot right now?'. While touching on these real-life fears and emotions, she also wanted it to "have an uplifting spirit that brings us together in terms of something we all go through in our lives". Townes initially shared a snippet of the song on the social media platform TikTok in December of 2020, and received a large stream of support and messages from fans who felt they could personally relate to the lyrics, prompting her to release the song.

== Critical reception ==
Lauren Jo Black of Country Now described the song as "an anthem for single people everywhere". Gareth Williams of Belles & Gals gave a favourable review of the track, stating that it "builds through verses caught between contentment and yearning before bursting out in a guitar-led chorus of country-pop that express perfectly how so many in the same position feel", adding that Townes "stops short of selling coupledom as the ultimate goal of life. Instead, she simply expresses an emotion, being vulnerable enough to open up about a personal struggle that doesn’t define her but is nevertheless a part of her". Top Country named "When's It Gonna Happen" their "Pick of the Week" for March 11, 2022, with the outlet saying it "tells the story of waiting on that particular moment of meeting that special someone and ultimately, believing in love," while labelling it a "song you do not want to miss out on".

== Commercial performance ==
"When's It Gonna Happen" reached a peak of number seven on the Billboard Canada Country chart for the week of May 14, 2022, marking Townes' fifth career top ten hit. It also peaked at number 87 on the all-genre Canadian Hot 100 for the week of April 30, 2022, spending 5 weeks in total on that chart. The song did not chart in the United States, although it did appear in the "New and Active" section of the Billboard Country Airplay chart for the week of February 5, 2022.

== Music video ==
The official music video for "When's It Gonna Happen" premiered on YouTube on January 14, 2022, coinciding with the release of the song.

== Charts ==
Chart performance for "When's It Gonna Happen"
Chart (2022)	Peak position
Canada (Canadian Hot 100)	87
Canada Country (Billboard)	7
