= Tenille Townes =

Canadian country music singer

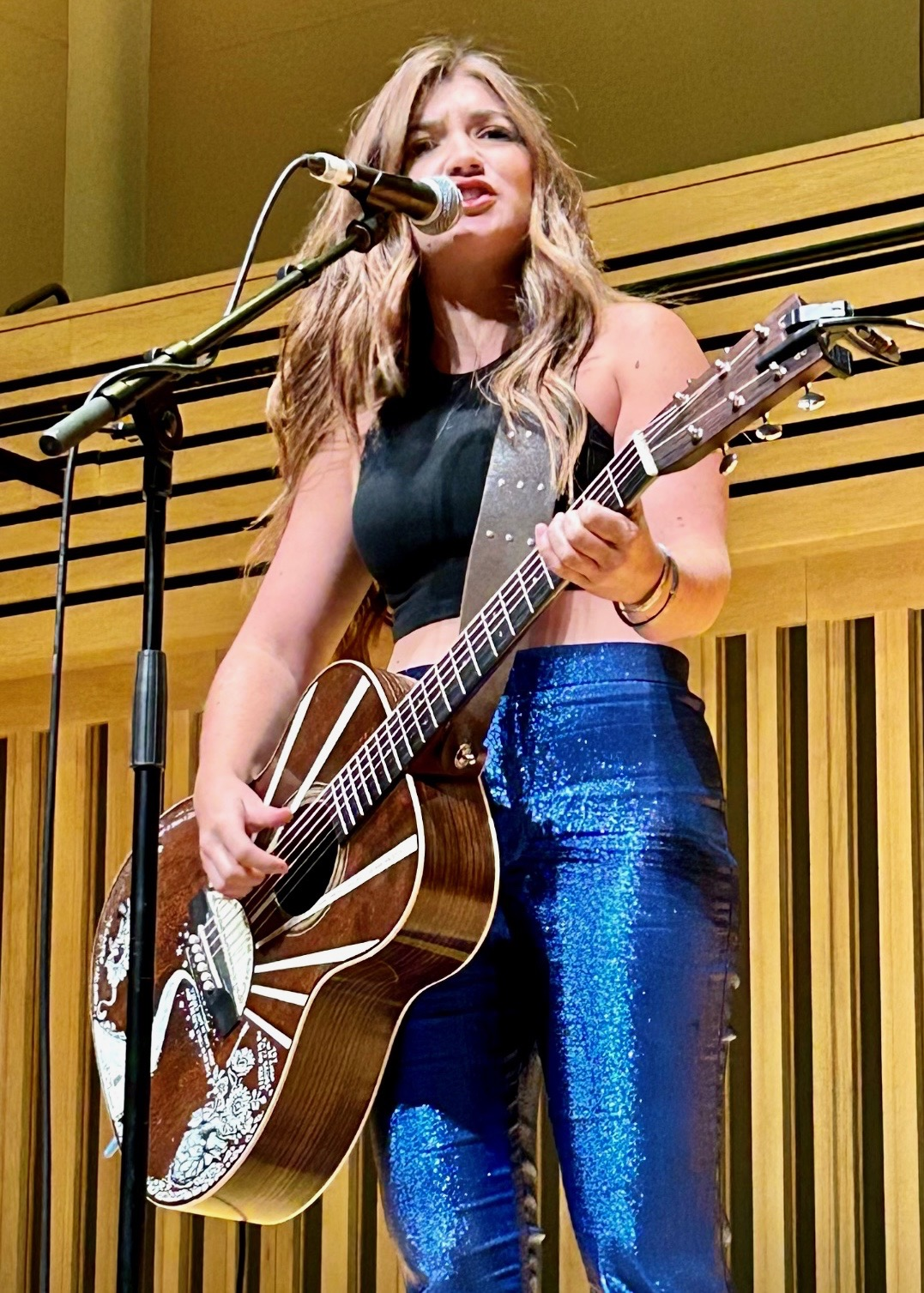
- Townes performing at The Stoller Hall in Manchester, England, 2023

Background information
- Born: Tenille Nicole Nadkrynechny; January 20, 1994 (age 32)
- Origin: Grande Prairie, Alberta, Canada
- Genre: Country pop
- Occupations: Singer; songwriter
- Instruments: Vocals; guitar
- Years active: 2009–present
- Labels: Royalty; Columbia Nashville; RCA
- Website: tenilletownes.com

Tenille Townes (born Tenille Nicole Nadkrynechny; January 20, 1994) is a Canadian country music singer from Grande Prairie, Alberta. In 2011, at the age of 17, she was nominated for a Canadian Country Music Award for Female Artist of the Year.

== Biography ==
Townes was raised in Grande Prairie, Alberta, and attended Peace Wapiti Academy high school. She was introduced to country music by her parents and grandparents during trips in the family car. At the age of nine, she attended a concert by Shania Twain during her Up! Tour bearing a sign asking for chance to sing with Twain on stage, which Twain granted. In 2009, she released the single "Home Now", a song she wrote from the perspective of a daughter whose father is posted in the war in Afghanistan, a topic she learned about in school. The track was produced by country musician Duane Steele.

Townes released her first album, Real, in June 2011. She has raised over $1.9 million for Sunrise House, a shelter for homeless youth in Alberta, through her annual fundraiser, Big Hearts For Big Kids. She appeared on the national television show Canada AM in August 2011, performing her single "Real Me," and has released multiple songs to radio. She released her second album, Light, in March 2013. That same year, she relocated to Nashville.

Although Townes started her career under her birthname, she later changed her surname. In a 2018 interview on Everything GP, she explained, "Townes is actually from Township Road 722, which is the road that I grew up on and the house that built me essentially, so that’s where that all comes from.”

On April 13, 2018, Townes announced, through her official Facebook page that she had signed a record deal with Columbia Nashville. She released her first single with the label, "Somebody's Daughter," in September 2018, and it became her first to chart, where it reached number 92 on the Canadian Hot 100 and was a Number One hit on the Canadian Country chart dated February 2, 2019.

In 2018, Townes served as the opening act for all dates for Miranda Lambert and Little Big Town on their joint The Bandwagon Tour. In 2019 she appeared on Donovan Woods's album The Other Way, as a duet vocalist on the song "I Ain't Ever Loved No One".

Townes won four awards at the 2019 Canadian Country Music Association (CCMA) Awards, which included one for Female Artist of the year, and three for "Somebody's Daughter" which won Single, Song, and Video of the Year.

In 2024, Townes parted ways with her longtime record label, Sony Music Nashville. To recognize Townes, and pay tribute to the positive impact she has made through her music and philanthropic efforts, on November 19, 2024, The City of Grande Prairie and Grande Prairie Sunrise House announced the renaming of a portion of 107 Avenue to Tenille Townes Way.

In 2025, Townes collaborated with fellow Canadian country artist Nate Haller on "Backfire". On February 27, 2026, she announced her fourth album, The Acrobat alongside the release of the title track, co-written with and featuring Lori McKenna. The album was recorded, produced, and mixed solely by Townes, who also plays every instrument on the project, and is set for release on April 10 via her own Township Records.

== Discography ==
=== Albums ===
Title	Details	Peak chart positions	
Title	Details	CAN	US Country
Real	Release date: June 14, 2011; Label: Royalty	—	—
Light	Release date: March 12, 2013; Label: Royalty	—	—
The Lemonade Stand	Release date: June 26, 2020; Label: Columbia Nashville	26	41
The Acrobat	Release date: April 10, 2026; Label: Township	—	—
"—" denotes releases that did not chart.

=== Extended plays ===
Title	Details	Peak chart positions
Title	Details	CAN
Living Room Worktapes	Release date: April 13, 2018; Label: Columbia Nashville	—
Road to the Lemonade Stand	Release date: February 7, 2020; Label: Columbia Nashville	91
Masquerades	Release date: April 22, 2022; Label: Columbia Nashville / RCA Records	—
Train Track Worktapes	Release date: April 21, 2023; Label: Columbia Nashville	—
"—" denotes releases that did not chart.

=== Singles ===
==== As lead artist ====
Year	Title	Peak chart positions				Certifications	Album
Year	Title	CAN	CAN Country	US Country Songs	US Country Airplay	Certifications	Album
2009	"Home Now"	—	—	—	—		Real
2010	"Wendy (Can You Hear Me Peter Pan)"	—	—	—	—		Real
2011	"Pictures on a Crooked Wall"	—	—	—	—		Real
2011	"Real Me"	—	—	—	—		Real
2011	"Home Now" (with John Landry)	—	—	—	—		Non-album single
2012	"Starts with You"	—	—	—	—		Light
2013	"Dear Heart"	—	—	—	—		Light
2013	"Halfway to Somewhere"	—	—	—	—		Light
2018	"Somebody's Daughter"	92	1	29	26	MC: Platinum; RIAA: Gold	The Lemonade Stand
2019	"White Horse"	—	8	—	—		The Lemonade Stand
2019	"Jersey on the Wall (I'm Just Asking)"	88	1	—	—	MC: Gold	The Lemonade Stand
2020	"The Most Beautiful Things"	—	43	—	—		The Lemonade Stand
2020	"Come as You Are"	82	4	—	—		The Lemonade Stand
2021	"Girl Who Didn't Care"	86	5	—	—		Non-album single
2022	"When's It Gonna Happen"	87	7	—	—		Masquerades
2022	"The Last Time"	91	5	—	—		Non-album singles
2023	"The Thing That Wrecks You" (with Bryan Adams)	— (Note: "The Thing That Wrecks You" did not enter the Billboard Canadian Hot 100, but peaked at number 25 on the Canadian Digital Song Sales component chart.)	30	—	—		Non-album singles
2023	"Home to Me"	—	38	—	—		Train Track Worktapes
2024	"As You Are"	—	—	—	—		Non-album singles
2024	"Thing That Brought Me Here (Truck Song)"	—	21	—	—		Non-album singles
2025	"Backfire" (with Nate Haller)	79	3	—	—		Non-album singles
2026	"Enabling"	—	—	—	—		The Acrobat
2026	"The Acrobat" (featuring Lori McKenna)	—	—	—	—		The Acrobat
2026	"Sunshine's Free"	—	7	—	—		Non-album single
"—" denotes releases that did not chart.

==== As featured artist ====
Title	Year	Album
"I Know" (Train featuring Tenille Townes and Bryce Vine)	2023	Non-album single

=== Other charted songs ===
Year	Song	Peak chart positions		Album
Year	Song	CAN Country	US Country Songs	Album
2019	"Fooled Around and Fell in Love" (with Miranda Lambert, Maren Morris, Ashley McBryde, Caylee Hammack, and Elle King)	—	47	Non-album song
2020	"One in a Million"	45	—	Songs for Christmas
"—" denotes releases that did not chart.

=== Music videos ===
Year	Video	Director
2011	"Pictures on a Crooked Wall"	Warren P. Sonoda
2013	"Dear Heart"	Stephano Barberis
2018	"Somebody's Daughter"	P.R. Brown
2019	"Jersey on the Wall (I'm Just Asking)"	Mason Dixon
2021	"Girl Who Didn't Care"	Mason Dixon
2022	"When You Need It"	Alex Alvga
2023	"The Thing That Wrecks You"	Bryan Adams
2024	"As You Are"	Brenton Giesey

== Awards and nominations ==
Year	Association	Category	Result
2011	Canadian Country Music Association	Female Artist of the Year	Nominated
2013	Canadian Country Music Association	Interactive Artist of the Year	Nominated
2014	Canadian Country Music Association	Interactive Artist of the Year	Nominated
2019	CMT Music Awards	Breakthrough Video of the Year – "Somebody's Daughter"	Nominated
2019	Canadian Country Music Association	Female Artist of the Year	Won
2019	Canadian Country Music Association	Single of the Year – "Somebody's Daughter"	Won
2019	Canadian Country Music Association	Video of the Year – "Somebody's Daughter"	Won
2019	Canadian Country Music Association	Songwriter of the Year (shared with Barry Dean, Luke Laird)	Won
2020	Juno Awards	Breakthrough Artist of the Year	Nominated
2020	Juno Awards	Songwriter of the Year	Nominated
2020	ACM Awards	New Female Artist of the Year	Won
2020	ACM Awards	Musical Event of the Year – "Fooled Around and Fell In Love"	Won
2020	Canadian Country Music Association	TD Entertainer of the Year	Nominated
2020	Canadian Country Music Association	Fan's Choice Award	Nominated
2020	Canadian Country Music Association	Female Artist of the Year	Won
2020	Canadian Country Music Association	Interactive Artist or Group of the Year	Nominated
2020	Canadian Country Music Association	Songwriter of the Year (shared with Tina Parol, Gordie Sampson)	Won
2020	Canadian Country Music Association	Video of the Year – "Jersey On The Wall (I’m Just Asking)"	Won
2020	CMA Awards	Musical Event of the Year – "Fooled Around and Fell In Love"	Nominated
2021	Juno Awards of 2021	Country Album of the Year – Tenille Townes	Won
2021	2021 Canadian Country Music Awards	Album of the Year – "The Lemonade Stand"	Won
2021	2021 Canadian Country Music Awards	Fan's Choice Award	Nominated
2021	2021 Canadian Country Music Awards	Female Artist of the Year	Won
2021	2021 Canadian Country Music Awards	Songwriter of the Year (shared with Marc Beeson, Daniel Tashian)	Nominated
2022	Canadian Country Music Association	Entertainer of the Year	Won
2022	Canadian Country Music Association	Album of the Year – Masquerades	Won
2022	Canadian Country Music Association	Fans' Choice	Nominated
2022	Canadian Country Music Association	Female Artist of the Year	Won
2022	Canadian Country Music Association	Single of the Year – "Girl Who Didn't Care"	Won
2022	Canadian Country Music Association	Songwriter(s) of the Year (shared with Steph Jones, David Pramik)	Won
2022	Canadian Country Music Association	Video of the Year – "Girl Who Didn't Care"	Nominated
2022	Country Music Association Awards	International Artist Achievement Award	Nominated
2023	Canadian Country Music Association	Entertainer of the Year	Nominated
2023	Canadian Country Music Association	Fans' Choice	Nominated
2023	Canadian Country Music Association	Female Artist of the Year	Won
2023	Canadian Country Music Association	Songwriter of the Year – "The Thing That Wrecks You"	Nominated
2023	Canadian Country Music Association	Video of the Year – "The Thing That Wrecks You"	Nominated
2024	Canadian Country Music Association	Female Artist of the Year	Nominated
