= The Lemonade Stand =

Studio album by Tenille Townes
- Released: June 26, 2020
- Genre: Country pop
- Length: 45:08
- Label: Columbia Nashville
- Producer: Jay Joyce

Tenille Townes chronology
Light (2013)	The Lemonade Stand (2020)

Singles from The Lemonade Stand
- 1. "Somebody's Daughter" Released: September 24, 2018; 2. "White Horse" Released: March 1, 2019; 3. "Jersey on the Wall (I'm Just Asking)" Released: September 9, 2019; 4. "The Most Beautiful Things" Released: April 6, 2020; 5. "Come As You Are" Released: June 27, 2020

The Lemonade Stand is the third studio album and the major label debut by Canadian country music singer Tenille Townes. It was released on June 26, 2020, under Columbia Nashville. The album produced two number-one singles on the Canada Country chart: "Somebody's Daughter" and "Jersey on the Wall (I'm Just Asking)".

== Critical reception ==
Professional ratings
Aggregate scores
Source	Rating
Metacritic	77/100
Review scores
Source	Rating
AllMusic	4/5 stars
American Songwriter	3/5 stars
Exclaim!	7/10
Paste	7.4/10

The Lemonade Stand was met with "generally favorable" reviews from critics. At Metacritic, which assigns a weighted average rating out of 100 to reviews from mainstream publications, this release received an average score of 77, based on 4 reviews.

In a review for AllMusic, Stephen Thomas Erlewine writes that the album "has vague echoes of [Miranda] Lambert within its songs" and that "the occasional moments where [producer Jay] Joyce strips away all the pop pizzazz reveal Townes as a sharp singer/songwriter." Lee Zimmerman of American Songwriter rated the album three stars out of five and wrote that The Lemonade Stand "finds [Townes] a confident and credible artist clearly capable of courting widespread crossover appeal." Scott Roos of Exclaim! wrote that "whatever this record "is" in terms of its overall sound, it will appeal to a broad audience with its series of radio-friendly medium-tempo stompers and tender ballads," and summarized the album as a "solid" debut. Ellen Johnson of Paste applauded Townes' relatable lyric writing and wrote that she "has the power to convey powerful personal narratives in song and somehow still make you believe the words were about your own life all along."

=== Accolades ===
The album won the Juno Award for Country Album of the Year at the Juno Awards of 2021, and the Canadian Country Music Award for Album of the Year at the 2021 Canadian Country Music Awards.

== Commercial performance ==
The Lemonade Stand debuted at number 26 on the Canadian Albums Chart dated July 10, 2020 and was the week's highest debut on the chart. In the United States, the album failed to enter the Billboard 200, but did peak at number 32 on the Top Album Sales component chart. The Lemonade Stand additionally reached number 41 on the Top Country Albums chart and number 5 on the Heatseekers Albums chart. In the UK, the album peaked at number 67 on the Scottish Albums Chart and at number 61 on the UK Album Downloads Chart, the digital sales component of the UK Albums Chart.

== Track listing ==
Track listing adapted from Tidal.

The Lemonade Stand track listing
No.	Title	Music	Length
1.	"Holding Out for the One"	Daniel Tashian; Marc Beeson; Tenille Townes	3:14
2.	"Where You Are"	Tashian; Townes; Keelan Donovan	4:21
3.	"Jersey on the Wall (I'm Just Asking)"	Gordie Sampson; Tina Parol; Townes	4:06
4.	"Lighthouse"	Dan Agee; Townes	3:36
5.	"White Horse"	Tashian; Townes; Jeremy Spillman	4:05
6.	"I Kept the Roses"	Chris Gelbuda; Dustin Christensen; Townes	4:01
7.	"When I Meet My Maker"	Townes	3:32
8.	"Come as You Are"	Tashian; Beeson; Townes	3:08
9.	"The Way You Look Tonight"	Tashian; Donovan; Townes	4:18
10.	"Find You"	Tashian; Sacha Skarbek; Townes	3:00
11.	"Somebody's Daughter"	Barry Dean; Luke Laird; Townes	3:47
12.	"The Most Beautiful Things"	Sampson; Josh Kear; Townes	4:00
Total length:			45:08

== Personnel ==
Credits adapted from Tidal.

- Tenille Townes – lead vocals (all tracks), acoustic guitar (tracks 1, 2, 3, 5, 7, 8, 9, 10, 11)
- Daniel Tashian – background vocals (tracks 1, 2, 5, 8, 9, 10), piano (track 2), keyboard (track 9)
- Keelan Donovan – background vocals (tracks 2, 9)
- Marc Beeson – background vocals (tracks 1, 8)
- Barry Dean – background vocals (track 11)
- Luke Laird – background vocals (track 11)
- Jeremy Spillman – background vocals (track 5)
- Dan Agee – background vocals (track 4)
- Sascha Skarbek – background vocals (track 10)
- Chris Gelbuda – background vocals (track 6)
- Dustin Christensen – background vocals (track 6)
- Jerry Roe – drums (tracks 1, 5, 8)
- Fred Eltringham – drums (tracks 2, 3, 4, 6, 9, 10, 11)
- Jaxon Hargrove – electric guitar (tracks 2, 3, 4, 7, 8, 10), percussion (track 5), Twelve-string guitar (track 9)
- Jay Joyce – electric guitar (tracks 1, 2, 3, 4, 5, 7, 8, 9), keyboard (tracks 6, 10, 12)
- Jimmy Manfield – percussion (track 5)
- Jason Hall – percussion (track 5)
- Gordie Sampson – background vocals (tracks 3, 12)
- Josh Kear – background vocals (track 12)
- Tina Parol – background vocals (track 3)
- William Mercer – bass guitar (tracks 3, 6, 9, 10, 11)
- Sam Rodberg – bass guitar (track 5)
- Robert E. McNelley II – electric guitar (tracks 3, 6, 9, 10, 11)
- Billy Justineau – piano (track 12)

== Charts ==
Chart performance for The Lemonade Stand
Chart (2020)	Peak position
Canadian Albums (Billboard)	26
Scottish Albums (Official Charts)	67
UK Album Downloads (Official Charts)	61
US Heatseekers Albums (Billboard)	5
US Top Album Sales (Billboard)	32
US Top Country Albums (Billboard)	41
