= Tenille Arts =

Canadian country music singer (b. 1994)

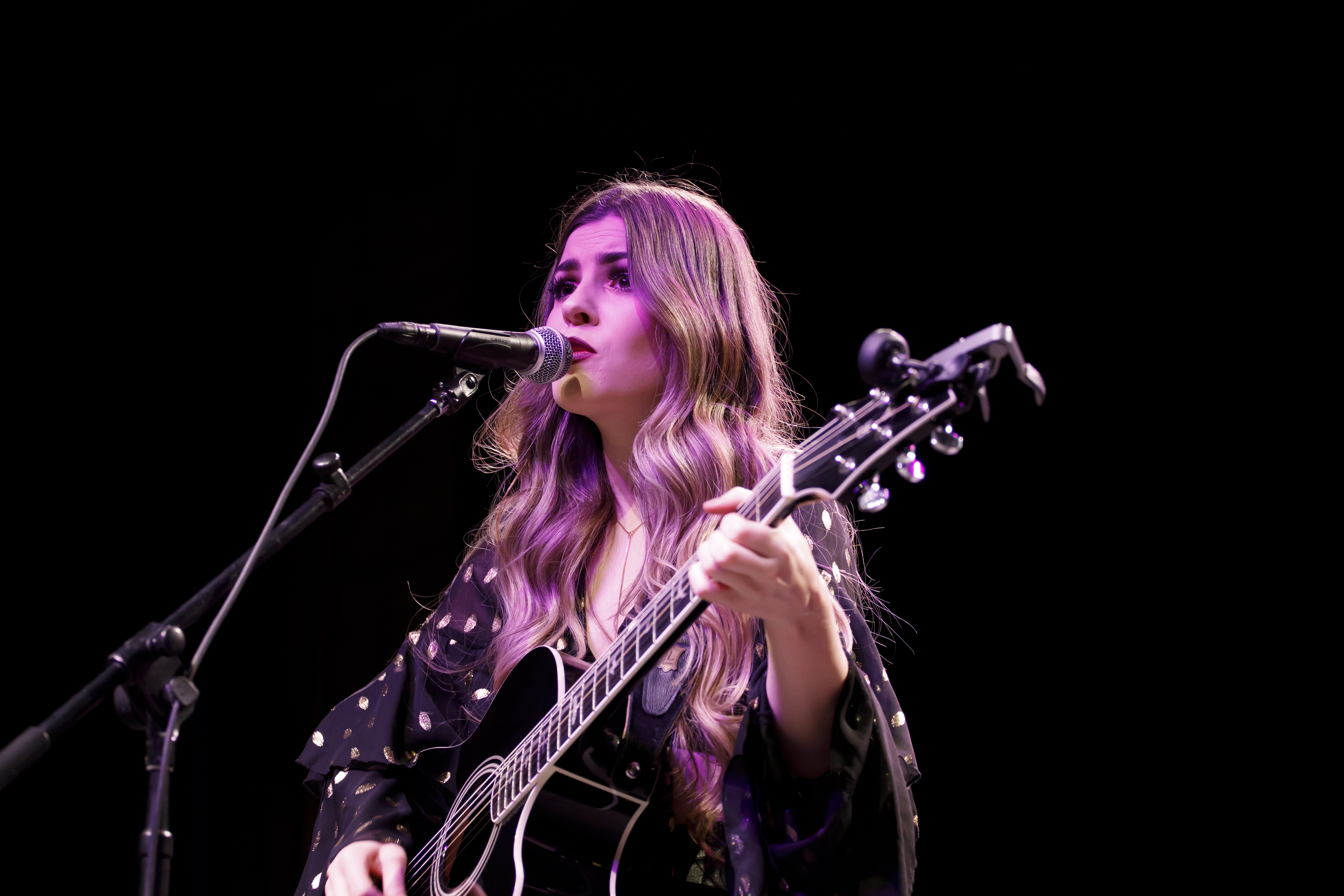
- Tenille Arts performing in October 2018

Background information
- Born: Tenille Jade Dakota Arts; April 19, 1994 (age 32); Weyburn, Saskatchewan, Canada
- Origin: Weyburn, Saskatchewan, Canada
- Genre: Country
- Occupations: Singer; songwriter
- Instruments: Vocals, acoustic guitar
- Years active: 2009–present
- Labels: Dreamcatcher; 19th & Grand; Reviver
- Website: www.tenillearts.com

Tenille Jade Dakota Arts (born April 19, 1994) is a Canadian country music singer from Weyburn, Saskatchewan. She released a self-titled extended play and her debut studio album Rebel Child with 19th & Grand Records. In 2020, Arts released the album Love, Heartbreak, & Everything in Between and won the Rising Star Award from the Canadian Country Music Association. She released her third studio album Girl to Girl in October 2021. In 2022, Arts signed to Dreamcatcher Artists. She released her fourth album To Be Honest in 2024.

== Biography ==
Arts was raised in her hometown of Weyburn, Saskatchewan, where she began taking lessons in piano and singing, and developed an interest in songwriting in her teenage years. By 2009, she began posting videos of her cover versions of popular songs, including one of Taylor Swift's "Fifteen" that captured the attention of a talent manager from Nashville, Tennessee. Arts briefly relocated to Nashville to pursue this opportunity, but returned to Canada to finish high school. In 2015, she relocated to Nashville to sign a publishing contract with Noble Vision Music Group and released "Breathe", a charity single in support of Cystic Fibrosis research.

She was awarded the Emerging Artists Award from the Saskatchewan Country Music Association and was nominated for the Discovery Artist program from the Canadian Country Music Association, both in 2016, for her burgeoning success. That year, she released her debut, self-titled extended play through the independent label imprint 19th & Grand Records. "What He's Into" was released to Canadian country radio in January 2017 as her official debut single and reached 47 on the Canada Country airplay chart. Following the success of that record, Arts released her debut studio album, Rebel Child, on October 27, 2017, preceded by the single, "Cold Feet". The album reached number 45 on the sales component chart of the Billboard Top Country Albums chart.

In 2018, Arts made an appearance on the 22nd season of popular American reality television series, The Bachelor, performing an original ballad titled, "Moment of Weakness" and in 2020 performing "Somebody Like That". Exposure from the show led to increased interest in Arts's music and a record deal from indie label Reviver Records, which she signed in March 2018. A deluxe edition of Rebel Child was issued that year with new tracks including "Moment of Weakness". Her first release for Reviver, "I Hate This", was released in the summer of 2018 and charted on the Hot Country Songs in the United States. A Canadian-exclusive single, "Mad Crazy Love", became Arts's second single to reach the Canadian country airplay charts. Two further singles were released in 2019 – "Call You Names" and "Somebody Like That" – to promote her second studio album, Love, Heartbreak, & Everything in Between, which was released on January 10, 2020.

On October 22, 2021, Arts released her third studio album Girl to Girl, which included the singles "Give It to Me Straight" and "Back Then, Right Now". In 2022, Arts signed with Dreamcatcher Artists as the flagship artist on their label. As part of the deal, Dreamcatcher acquired her entire catalogue and released the new single "Jealous of Myself". Arts joined Lee Brice on his early 2023 "Beer Drinking Opportunity Tour" in Canada along with Josh Ross. In May 2024, she released her fourth album To Be Honest. In November 2024, she duetted with fellow Canadian country artist Tebey on the single "Hangover at My Place".

== Discography ==
=== Albums ===
Title	Details	Peak positions	
Title	Details	US Country	US Heat.
Rebel Child	Release date: October 27, 2017; Label: 19th & Grand	— (Note: Rebel Child did not enter the Top Country Albums chart, but did peak at number 45 on the Country Album Sales component chart.)	—
Love, Heartbreak, & Everything in Between	Release date: January 10, 2020; Label: Reviver, 19th & Grand	—	19
Girl to Girl	Release date: October 22, 2021; Label: 19th & Grand	—	—
To Be Honest	Release date: May 3, 2024; Label: Dreamcatcher Artists	—	—
"—" denotes a single that did not chart or was not released to that territory.

=== Extended plays ===
Title	Details
Tenille Arts	Release date: October 14, 2016; Label: 19th & Grand

=== Singles ===
Year	Title	Peak chart positions					Certifications	Album
Year	Title	CAN	CAN Country	US	US Country Songs	US Country Airplay	Certifications	Album
2015	"Breathe"	—	—	—	—	—		Non-album single
2017	"What He's Into"	—	47	—	—	—		Tenille Arts
2017	"Cold Feet"	—	—	—	—	—		Rebel Child
2018	"Moment of Weakness"	—	—	—	—	—		Rebel Child
2018	"I Hate This"	— (Note: "I Hate This" did not enter the Billboard Canadian Hot 100, but peaked at number 49 on the Canadian Digital Song Sales component chart.)	—	—	41	—		Love, Heartbreak, & Everything in Between
2018	"Mad Crazy Love"	—	40	—	—	—		Non-album single
2019	"Call You Names"	—	—	—	—	—		Love, Heartbreak, & Everything in Between
2019	"Somebody Like That"	—	9	50	7	3	RIAA: Platinum	Love, Heartbreak, & Everything in Between
2020	"Everybody Knows Everybody"	—	12	—	—	—		Love, Heartbreak, & Everything in Between
2021	"Give It to Me Straight"	—	6	—	—	—		Girl to Girl
2021	"Back Then, Right Now"	85	12	—	—	34		Girl to Girl
2022	"Girl to Girl"	—	10	—	—	—		Girl to Girl
2023	"Jealous of Myself" (solo or featuring LeAnn Rimes)	—	43	—	—	56		To Be Honest
2024	"Last Time Last" (featuring Maddie & Tae)	—	51	—	—	—		To Be Honest
2025	"Hangover at My Place" (with Tebey)	—	38	—	—	—		TBA
2026	"Don't Ruin Flowers"	—	22	—	—	—		TBA
"—" denotes a single that did not chart or was not released to that territory.

=== Promotional singles ===
Year	Title	Album
2017	"Wildfire and Whiskey"	Tenille Arts
2019	"Wouldn't You Like to Know"	Love, Heartbreak, & Everything in Between
2021	"Over You Is You" (featuring Matt Stell)	Girl to Girl
2023	"Summer Don't Go"	To Be Honest
2023	"Wonder Woman"	To Be Honest
2024	"Next Best Thing"	To Be Honest
2025	"Unbecoming"	TBA

=== Music videos ===
Year	Title	Director	Ref.
2017	"What He's Into"		
2017	"Cold Feet"	Patrick Tohill	
2018	"I Hate This"	Todd Cassetty	
2019	"Somebody Like That"	Stephen Kinigopoulos & Alexa Kinigopoulos	
2019	"Tears"	Robby Starbuck	
2020	"Everybody Knows Everybody"	Grant Claire	
2021	"Give It to Me Straight"	Grant Claire	
2021	"Back Then, Right Now"	Kristen Barlowe	
2023	"Jealous of Myself"	Roman White	
2025	"Don't Ruin Flowers"	Joey Brodnax	
2026	"Lonely Weekend"	Ryan Nolan	
2026	"If Somebody Told Me You Were Dying"	Ryan Nolan	

== Awards and nominations ==
Tenille Arts awards and nominations
Awards and nominations
Award	Wins	Nominations
Canadian Country Music Awards	4	22
Juno Awards	0	1
Saskatchewan Country Music Awards	15	19
Western Canadian Music Awards	2	4

Totals (Note: Certain award groups do not simply award one winner. They acknowledge several different recipients, have runners-up, and have third place. Since this is a specific recognition and is different from losing an award, runner-up mentions are considered wins in this award tally. For simplification and to avoid errors, each award in this list has been presumed to have had a prior nomination.)
- Wins: 23
- Nominations: 48

Year	Association	Category	Work	Result	Ref.
2016	Canadian Country Music Awards	Discovery Artist Award	Herself	Nominated	
2016	Saskatchewan Country Music Awards	Emerging Artist Award	Herself	Won	
2017	Saskatchewan Country Music Awards	Album of the Year	Tenille Arts	Nominated	
2018	Canadian Country Music Awards	Interactive Artist or Group of the Year	Herself	Nominated	
2018	Saskatchewan Country Music Awards	Female Artist of the Year	Herself	Won	
2018	Saskatchewan Country Music Awards	Album of the Year	Rebel Child	Won	
2018	Saskatchewan Country Music Awards	Songwriter of the Year	"Rain Drops, Dirt Road"	Won	
2018	Saskatchewan Country Music Awards	Single of the Year	"What He's Into"	Won	
2018	Saskatchewan Country Music Awards	Video of the Year	"Cold Feet"	Won	
2019	Saskatchewan Country Music Awards	Fans' Choice Entertainer of the Year	Herself	Nominated	
2019	Saskatchewan Country Music Awards	Female Artist of the Year	Herself	Won	
2019	Saskatchewan Country Music Awards	Interactive Artist of the Year	Herself	Nominated	
2019	Saskatchewan Country Music Awards	Songwriter of the Year	"Mad Crazy Love"	Won	
2019	Saskatchewan Country Music Awards	Single of the Year	"Mad Crazy Love"	Nominated	
2019	Saskatchewan Country Music Awards	Video of the Year	"I Hate This"	Nominated	
2020	Canadian Country Music Awards	Album of the Year	Love, Heartbreak, & Everything in Between	Nominated	
2020	Canadian Country Music Awards	Rising Star of the Year	Herself	Won	
2020	Saskatchewan Country Music Awards	Female Artist	Herself	Won	
2020	Saskatchewan Country Music Awards	Songwriter of the Year	Herself (shared with Alex Klin and Allison Veltz)	Won	
2021	Canadian Country Music Awards	Fans' Choice	Herself	Nominated	
2021	Canadian Country Music Awards	Female Artist of the Year	Herself	Nominated	
2021	Saskatchewan Country Music Awards	Female Artist of the Year	Herself	Won	
2021	Saskatchewan Country Music Awards	Songwriter of the Year	Herself (Shared with Allison Veltz Cruz and Alex Kline)	Won	
2021	Saskatchewan Country Music Awards	Single of the Year	"Somebody Like That"	Won	
2021	Saskatchewan Country Music Awards	Album or EP of the Year	Love, Heartbreak & Everything in Between	Won	
2021	Academy of Country Music Awards	New Female Artist of the Year	Herself	Nominated	
2022	Juno Awards	Country Album of the Year	Girl to Girl	Nominated	
2022	Saskatchewan Country Music Awards	Female Artist of the Year	Herself	Won	
2022	Saskatchewan Country Music Awards	Interactive Artist or Group of the Year	Herself	Won	
2022	Saskatchewan Country Music Awards	National/International Artist Award	Herself	Won	
2022	Canadian Country Music Awards	Entertainer of the Year	Herself	Nominated	
2022	Canadian Country Music Awards	Fans' Choice	Herself	Nominated	
2022	Canadian Country Music Awards	Female Artist of the Year	Herself	Nominated	
2023	Canadian Country Music Awards	Female Artist of the Year	Herself	Nominated	
